= 2006–07 Greek Football Cup =

2006–07 Greek Cup
Hellas Online Greek Cup
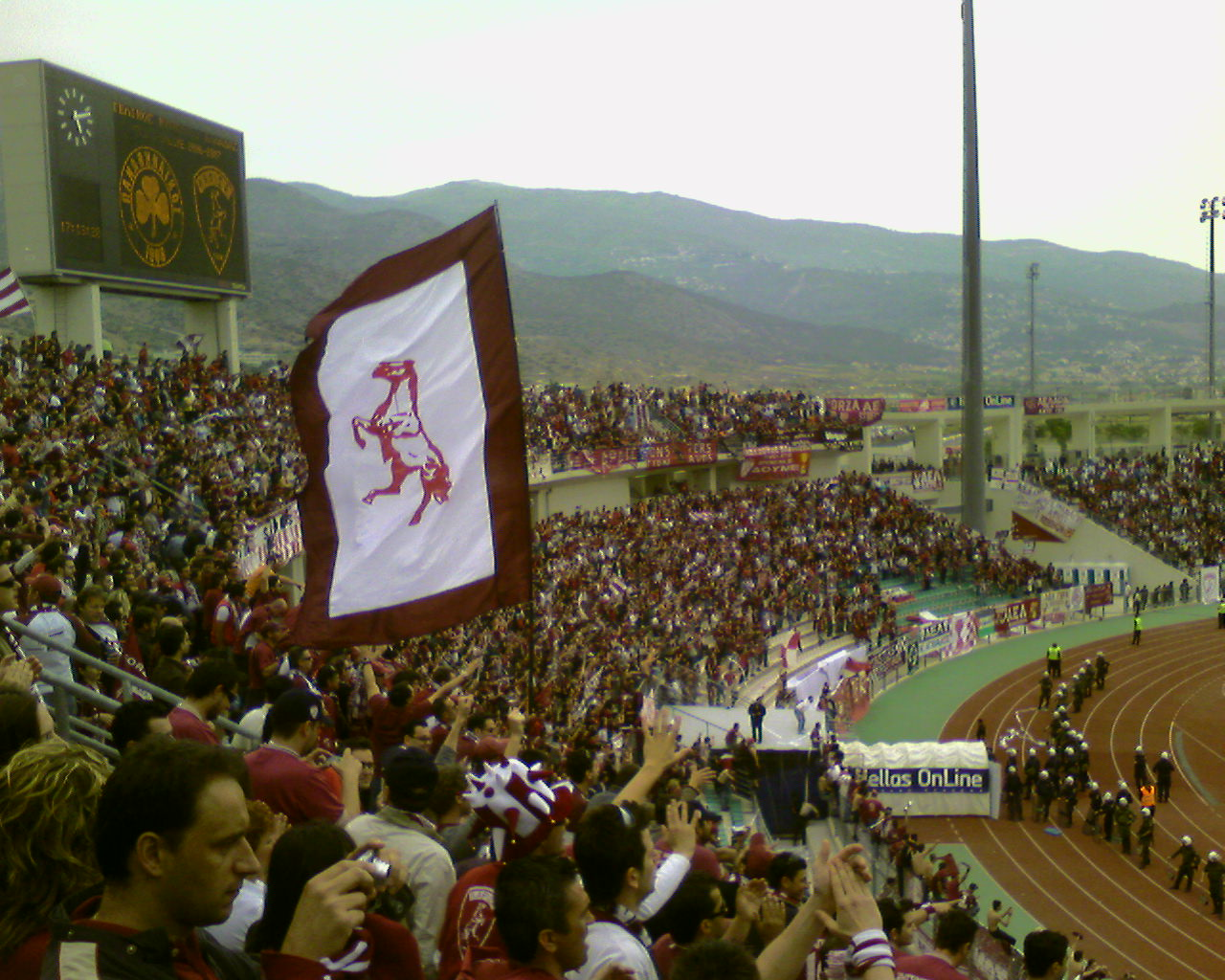
- AEL fans during the 2007 Greek Cup Final at the Panthessaliko Stadium.

Tournament details
- Country: Greece
- Teams: 67

Final positions
- Champions: AEL (2nd title)
- Runners-up: Panathinaikos

Tournament statistics
- Matches played: 77
- Goals scored: 181 (2.35 per match)
- Top goal scorer(s): Georgios Saitiotis (4 goals)

The 2006–07 Greek Football Cup was the 65th edition of the Greek Football Cup, competition. That edition was entitled "Hellas On Line Greek Cup" for sponsorship reasons. The competition started on 26 August 2006 and the final was held on 5 May 2007, at the Panthessaliko Stadium. AEL won the trophy with a 2–1 victory over Panathinaikos.

== Calendar ==
Round	Date(s)	Fixtures	Clubs	New entries	Leagues entering
First Round	26, 27, 30 August 2006	16	67 → 51	33	Gamma Ethniki
Second Round	20 September 2006	17	51 → 34	18	Beta Ethniki
Additional Round	11 October 2006	2	34 → 32	none	none
Round of 32	7–9, 15 November 2006	17	32 → 16	16	Super League
Round of 16	19–21 December 2006	12	16 → 8	none	none
Quarter-finals	17, 24, 31 January 2007	8	8 → 4	none	none
Semi-finals	28 February, 14 March & 18 April 2007	4	4 → 2	none	none
Final	5 May 2007	1	2 → 1	none	none

== Knockout phase ==
Each tie in the knockout phase, apart from the quarter-finals and the semi-finals, was played by a single match. If the score was level at the end of normal time, extra time was played, followed by a penalty shoot-out if the score was still level. In the quarter-finals and the semi-finals were played over two legs, with each team playing one leg at home. The team that scored more goals on aggregate over the two legs advanced to the next round. If the aggregate score was level, the away goals rule was applied, i.e. the team that scored more goals away from home over the two legs advanced. If away goals were also equal, then extra time was played. The away goals rule was again applied after extra time, i.e. if there were goals scored during extra time and the aggregate score was still level, the visiting team advanced by virtue of more away goals scored. If no goals were scored during extra time, the winners were decided by a penalty shoot-out. In the round of 16, if the score was level at the end of normal time the two-legged rule was applied.
The mechanism of the draws for each round is as follows:

- In the draw for the second round, the teams from the second division are seeded and the winners from the first round were unseeded. The seeded teams are drawn against the unseeded teams.
- In the draw for the Round of 32 onwards, the teams from the first division are seeded and the winners from the previous rounds were unseeded. The seeded teams are drawn against the unseeded teams.
- In the draws for the Round of 16 onwards, there are no seedings and teams from the different group can be drawn against each other.

== First round ==
The draw took place on 17 August 2006.

=== Summary ===
Team 1	Score	Team 2
26 August 2006
Diagoras	4–3	Enosi Thraki
Thyella Patras	3–0	Anagennisi Karditsa
Neoi Epivates	3–0	Lamia
Apollon Athens	2–1 (a.e.t.)	Polykastro
Acharnaikos	1–0	Agios Dimitrios
Koropi	0–1	Thermaikos Thermis
27 August 2006
Panetolikos	2–0	Odysseas Androutsos
Trikala	1–3	Thiva
Doxa Gratini	1–4	Pierikos
AE Giannena	1–0	Panachaiki 2005
Paniliakos	1–0	Ethnikos Katerini
Olympiacos Volos	1–0	Ilioupoli
Vyzas Megara	1–1 (5–4 p)	Nafpaktiakos Asteras
Anagennisi Arta	3–2 (a.e.t.)	Kavala
30 August 2006
Aiolikos	2–2 (5–4 p)	Rodos
Atsalenios	3–0	Doxa Drama
N/A
OF Ierapetra	bye	

=== Matches ===
26 August 2006
13:00 EEST

Diagoras	4–3	Enosi Thraki
Spartalis 10', 29', 87' (pen.); Voulgaris 76'	Report	Stathakis 31' (pen.), 56'; Ellenidis 43'

Diagoras Stadium, Rhodes
Referee: Nikolaos Potoglou (Piraeus)

26 August 2006
13:00 EEST

Thyella Patras	3–0	Anagennisi Karditsa
Bakomitros 59'; Pawela 80', 90'	Report

Fotis Aravantinos Stadium, Patras
Referee: Vasilios Athanasopoulos (Argolida)

26 August 2006
13:00 EEST

Neoi Epivates	3–0	Lamia
Hagan 46'; Nalbantis 68', 81'	Report

Neoi Epivates Stadium, Neoi Epivates
Referee: Ioannis Kementsetsidis (Kilkis)

26 August 2006
13:00 EEST

Apollon Athens	2–1 (a.e.t.)	Polykastro
Kone 31'; Gouletas 96'	Report	Fonseca 20'

Georgios Kamaras Stadium, Rizoupoli
Referee: Georgios Chatzis (Corinthia)

26 August 2006
13:00 EEST

Acharnaikos	1–0	Agios Dimitrios
Rousopoulos 45+1' (pen.)	Report

Acharnes Stadium, Acharnes
Referee: Alexandros Dimitropoulos (Athens)

26 August 2006
13:00 EEST

Koropi	0–1	Thermaikos Thermis
	Report	Papadopoulos 56'

Antonis Priftis Stadium, Koropi
Referee: Spyros Selimos (Laconia)

27 August 2006
13:00 EEST

Panetolikos	2–0	Odysseas Androutsos
Katsaros 29'; Skarmoutsos 39'	Report

Panetolikos Stadium, Agrinio
Referee: Petros Konstantineas (Messinia)

27 August 2006
13:00 EEST

Trikala	1–3	Thiva
Savić 54'	Report	Jones 15', 36'; Mostratos 80'

Trikala Municipal Stadium, Trikala
Referee: Dimitrios Koutsopoulos (Karditsa)

27 August 2006
13:00 EEST

Doxa Gratini	1–4	Pierikos
Dyakov 10' (pen.)	Report	Papavasiliou 8', 33' (pen.); Mukansi 65'; Tarasiadis 84'

Gratini Stadium, Gratini
Referee: Vasilios Terpsiadis (Drama)

27 August 2006
13:00 EEST

AE Giannena	1–0	Panachaiki
Aleksandrowicz 77'	Report

Zosimades Stadium, Ioannina
Referee: Ilias Kotoulas (Trikala)

27 August 2006
13:00 EEST

Paniliakos	2–0	Ethnikos Katerini
Markopoulos 57'; Diogo 72'	Report

Pyrgos Stadium, Pyrgos
Referee: Dimitrios Asimakis (Aetoloacarnania)

27 August 2006
13:00 EEST

Olympiacos Volos	1–0	Ilioupoli
Trichias 55'	Report

Panthessaliko Stadium, Volos
Referee: Apostolos Amparkiolis (Thessaloniki)

27 August 2006
13:00 EEST

Vyzas Megara	1–1 (a.e.t.)	Nafpaktiakos Asteras
Intzoglou 40'	Report	Nikić 4'
Penalties
	5–4

Megara Stadium, Megara
Referee: Panagiotis Karagounias (Achaea)

27 August 2006
13:00 EEST

Anagennisi Arta	3–2 (a.e.t.)	Kavala
Balafas 52', 90+1'; Triantos 102'	Report	Skarlatos 34'; Barreto 42'

Arta Stadium, Arta
Referee: Dimitrios Thanos (Epirus)

30 August 2006
13:00 EEST

Aiolikos	2–2 (a.e.t.)	Rodos
Papadimitriou 1', 87'	Report	Balogiannis 70' (pen.); G. Kantimiris 84'
Penalties
	5–4

Mytilene Municipal Stadium, Mytilene
Referee: Stavros Mantalos (Athens)

30 August 2006
13:00 EEST

Atsalenios	3–0	Doxa Drama
Ndeki 13', 47', 49'	Report

Atsalenios Stadium, Heraklion
Referee: Vasilios Raisakis (Chania)

== Second round ==
The draw took place on 17 August 2006, after the First Round draw.

=== Summary ===
Team 1	Score	Team 2
20 September 2006
Aiolikos	3–1	Messiniakos
Diagoras	1–2	Ilisiakos
Anagennisi Arta	0–1	Kallithea
Paniliakos	2–0	Veria
Apollon Athens	1–3	Agrotikos Asteras
Thiva	0–2	Panthrakikos
Pierikos	1–1 (4–2 p)	Kalamata
Thyella Patras	1–2 (a.e.t.)	Niki Volos
Acharnaikos	1–5	Kastoria
OF Ierapetra	0–5	Chaidari
AE Giannena	0–2	Trasyvoulos
Vyzas Megara	0–1	PAS Giannina
Neoi Epivates	2–4	Levadiakos
Olympiacos Volos	0–0 (5–4 p)	Proodeftiki
Panetolikos	1–0 (a.e.t.)	Ethnikos Piraeus
Atsalenios	1–0	Ethnikos Asteras
Thermaikos Thermis	1–2 (a.e.t.)	Asteras Tripolis
N/A
Panserraikos	bye	

=== Matches ===
20 September 2006
13:00 EEST

Aiolikos	3–1	Messiniakos
Karydis 36'; Chronis 66'; Mouratidis 90+4'	Report	Christoforidis 8'

Mytilene Municipal Stadium, Mytilene
Referee: Georgios Kandris (West Attica)

20 September 2006
13:00 EEST

Diagoras	1–2	Ilisiakos
Stergalas 46'	Report	Petkov 21'; Kozanidis 57'

Diagoras Stadium, Rhodes
Referee: Anastasios Papandriopoulos (Piraeus)

20 September 2006
13:00 EEST

Anagennisi Arta	0–1	Kallithea
	Report	Alexandropoulos 34'

Arta Stadium, Arta
Referee: Nikos Athanasiou (Thesprotia)

20 September 2006
13:00 EEST

Paniliakos	2–0	Veria
Michelidis 15'; Lamprogeorgos 29' (pen.)	Report

Pyrgos Stadium, Pyrgos
Referee: Michalis Karsiotis (Corinthia)

20 September 2006
13:00 EEST

Apollon Athens	1–3	Agrotikos Asteras
Skopelitis 12'	Report	Tsouklis 15'; Kyzeridis 14', 44' (pen.)

Georgios Kamaras Stadium, Rizoupoli
Referee: Marios Lampropoulos (Elis)

20 September 2006
13:00 EEST

Thiva	0–2	Panthrakikos
	Report	Souanis 47'; Mouratidis 68'

Thebes Municipal Stadium, Thebes
Referee: Andreas Pappas (Athens)

20 September 2006
13:00 EEST

Pierikos	1–1 (a.e.t.)	Kalamata
Papavasiliou 24'	Report	Spyropoulos 25'
Penalties
	4–2

Katerini Stadium, Katerini
Referee: Praxitelis Zachariadis (Thessaloniki)

20 September 2006
13:00 EEST

Thyella Patras	1–2 (a.e.t.)	Niki Volos
Pawela 51'	Report	Markomichalis 18'; Baiano 103'

Fotis Aravantinos Stadium, Patras
Referee: Giorgos Konstantinou (Aetoloacarnania)

20 September 2006
13:00 EEST

Acharnaikos	1–5	Kastoria
Drenova 36'	Report	Gilson 18'; Jocić 25', 65'; Cannellini 45'; Solakis 61'

Acharnes Stadium, Acharnes
Referee: Nikitas Datis (Chios)

20 September 2006
13:00 EEST

OF Ierapetra	0–5	Chaidari
	Report	Kripintiris 9'; Tsabouris 36', 80'; Lampropoulos 76'; Tournas 83'

Petros Vouzounerakis Stadium, Ierapetra
Referee: Michalis Voskakis (Rethymnο)

20 September 2006
13:00 EEST

AE Giannena	0–2	Trasyvoulos
	Report	Leonardo 36'; Urumov 81'

Zosimades Stadium, Ioannina
Referee: Antonis Valiotis (Larissa)

20 September 2006
13:00 EEST

Vyzas Megara	0–1	PAS Giannina
	Report	Kontogoulidis 59'

Megara Stadium, Megara
Referee: Konstantinos Ioannidis (Piraeus)

20 September 2006
13:00 EEST

Neoi Epivates	2–4	Levadiakos
Boulis 19'; Hagan 60'	Report	Chrysafis 22'; Kiassos 49'; Alex 59'; Anderson 65'

Neoi Epivates Stadium, Neoi Epivates
Referee: Dimitrios Georgoulas (Grevena)

20 September 2006
13:00 EEST

Olympiacos Volos	0–0 (a.e.t.)	Proodeftiki
	Report
Penalties
	5–4

Panthessaliko Stadium, Volos
Referee: Georgios Kastanidis (Thessaloniki)

20 September 2006
13:00 EEST

Panetolikos	1–0 (a.e.t.)	Ethnikos Piraeus
Chatzis 120'	Report

Panetolikos Stadium, Agrinio
Referee: Dimitrios Kyrkos (Epirus)

20 September 2006
13:00 EEST

Atsalenios	1–0	Ethnikos Asteras
Soutzis 55'	Report

Atsalenios Stadium, Heraklion
Referee: Georgios Karalakis (Lasithi)

20 September 2006
13:00 EEST

Thermaikos Thermis	1–2 (a.e.t.)	Asteras Tripolis
Musa 94'	Report	Klokidis 108', 112' (pen.)

Thermi Stadium, Thermi
Referee: Symeon Spyrou (Kastoria)

== Additional round ==
=== Summary ===
Team 1	Score	Team 2
Aiolikos	2–1	Kastoria
Olympiacos Volos	2–0	Kallithea

=== Matches ===
11 October 2006
13:00 EEST

Aiolikos	2–1	Kastoria
Martinos 7'; Mouratidis 23' (pen.)	Report	Iasonidis 44'

Mytilene Municipal Stadium, Mytilene
Referee: Anastasios Papandriopoulos (Piraeus)

11 October 2006
13:00 EEST

Olympiacos Volos	2–0	Kallithea
Georgiadis 44'; Machado 87'	Report

Panthessaliko Stadium, Volos
Referee: Giannis Krikkis (Trikala)

== Bracket ==
Round of 32
Panserraikos	0
PAOK	1
Aiolikos	2(3)
Ergotelis (p)	2(4)
Thrasyvoulos	0
Panathinaikos	1
Levadiakos	0
Apollon Kalamarias	1
Niki Volos (a.e.t.)	2
Aris	0
Ilisiakos (p)	1(5)
Atromitos	1(3)
Paniliakos	1
Panionios	2
Asteras Tripolis	0
Skoda Xanthi	1
Pierikos	2(3)
Kerkyra (p)	2(4)
Agrotikos Asteras	2
Ionikos (a.e.t.)	3
Panetolikos	1
OFI	2
Panthrakikos	1
AEL	3
Olympiacos Volos	0
Iraklis	1
PAS Giannina	2
Egaleo	0
Chaidari (p)	0(5)
AEK Athens	0(4)
Atsalenios	0
Olympiacos	2

Round of 16
PAOK	1
Ergotelis	0
Panathinaikos (p)	1	0	1(3)
Apollon Kalamarias	1	0	1(2)
Niki Volos	0
Ilisiakos	1
Panionios	0
Skoda Xanthi	1
Kerkyra	0	2	2
Ionikos	0	1	1
OFI	1	1	2
AEL	1	3	4
Iraklis	1
PAS Giannina	3
Chaidari	1
Olympiacos	3

Quarter-finals
PAOK	2	1	3
Panathinaikos (a.e.t.)	1	3	4
Ilisiakos	0	0	0
Skoda Xanthi	2	1	3
Kerkyra	0	0	0
AEL	0	2	2
PAS Giannina (a.e.t.)	2	1	3
Olympiacos	0	2	2

Semi-finals
Panathinaikos	0	1	1
Skoda Xanthi	0	0	0
AEL	2	2	4
PAS Giannina	0	0	0

Final
Panathinaikos	1
AEL	2

== Round of 32 ==
The draw took place on 17 August 2006.

=== Summary ===
Team 1	Score	Team 2
Panserraikos	0–1	PAOK
Chaidari	0–0 (5–4 p)	AEK Athens
PAS Giannina	2–0	Egaleo
Atsalenios	0–2	Olympiacos
Agrotikos Asteras	2–3 (a.e.t.)	Ionikos
Panthrakikos	1–3	AEL
Pierikos	2–2 (3–4 p)	Kerkyra
Niki Volos	2–0 (a.e.t.)	Aris
Thrasyvoulos	0–1	Panathinaikos
Levadiakos	0–1	Apollon Kalamarias
Panetolikos	1–2	OFI
Asteras Tripolis	0–1	Skoda Xanthi
Ilisiakos	1–1 (5–3 p)	Atromitos
Paniliakos	1–2	Panionios
Aiolikos	2–2 (3–4 p)	Ergotelis
Olympiacos Volos	0–1	Iraklis

=== Matches ===
7 November 2006
19:00 EET

Panserraikos	0–1	PAOK
	Report	Arabatzis 31'

Serres Municipal Stadium, Serres
Referee: Romanos Kontogiannidis (Xanthi)

9 November 2006
19:00 EET

Chaidari	0–0 (a.e.t.)	AEK Athens
	Report
Penalties
Chorianopoulos (penalty scored); Tsabouris (penalty scored); Tsirogiannis (penalty missed); Tsibonias (penalty scored); Yfantis (penalty scored); Kripintiris (penalty scored)	5–4	(penalty scored) Delibašić; (penalty scored) Júlio César; (penalty scored) Georgeas; (penalty missed) Sapanis; (penalty scored) Liberopoulos; (penalty missed) Moras

Stavros Mavrothalassitis Stadium, Egaleo
Attendance: 2,000
Referee: Kostas Zanetidis (Dodecanese)

15 November 2006
15:00 EET

PAS Giannina	2–0	Egaleo
Saitiotis 7', 80'	Report

Zosimades Stadium, Ioannina
Referee: Vasilios Argyropoulos (Kastoria)

8 November 2006
19:00 EET

Atsalenios	0–2	Olympiacos
	Report	Marić 49'; Pappas 76'

Pankritio Stadium, Heraklion
Referee: Charalampos Karatzas (Euboea)

9 November 2006
14:30 EET

Agrotikos Asteras	2–3 (a.e.t.)	Ionikos
Bekiaris 56'; Moysiadis 78'	Report	Triantafyllou 10'; da Costa 70'; Gutman 108'

Agrotikos Asteras Stadium, Thessaloniki
Referee: Theodoros Gaitatzis (Drama)

8 November 2006
14:30 EET

Panthrakikos	1–3	AEL
Bacharidis 81' (pen.)	Report	Galitsios 12'; Kalantzis 21'; Dabizas 51'

Komotini Municipal Stadium, Komotini
Referee: Dimitrios Kalopoulos (Macedonia)

8 November 2006
14:00 EET

Pierikos	2–2 (a.e.t.)	Kerkyra
Kalabakas 13'; Mukansi 118'	Report	Foufoulas 83'; Passios 120'
Penalties
Páez (penalty scored); Kalabakas (penalty scored); Provatidis (penalty missed); Makris (penalty scored); Giannoulis (penalty missed)	3–4	(penalty scored) D'Acol; (penalty scored) Fillip; (penalty scored) Kagiouzis; (penalty scored) Foufoulas

Katerini Stadium, Katerini
Attendance: 2,500
Referee: Georgios Zolotas (Thessaloniki)

15 November 2006
19:00 EET

Niki Volos	2–0 (a.e.t.)	Aris
Pavlidis 96'; Pittakas 102'	Report

Panthessaliko Stadium, Volos
Referee: Lazaros Polatian (Pella)

8 November 2006
16:00 EET

Thrasyvoulos	0–1	Panathinaikos
	Report	Morris 43'

Fyli Municipal Stadium, Fyli
Referee: Christoforos Zografos (Athens)

9 November 2006
16:00 EET

Levadiakos	0–1	Apollon Kalamarias
	Report	Wellington 44'

Levadia Municipal Stadium, Livadeia
Referee: Giannis Tsachilidis (Piraeus)

7 November 2006
14:30 EET

Panetolikos	1–2	OFI
Traoré 63'	Report	Drulić 20'; Nwafor 33'

Panetolikos Stadium, Agrinio
Referee: Thanasis Briakos (Epirus)

8 November 2006
14:30 EET

Asteras Tripolis	0–1	Skoda Xanthi
	Report	Messera 14'

Asteras Tripolis Stadium, Tripoli
Referee: Giorgos Kasnaferis (Athens)

9 November 2006
16:00 EET

Ilisiakos	1–1 (a.e.t.)	Atromitos
Kampas 103'	Report	Cristiano 110'
Penalties
	5–3

Grigoris Lamprakis Stadium, Zografou
Referee: Theofilos Fotiadis (Thessaloniki)

9 November 2006
14:30 EET

Paniliakos	1–2	Panionios
Iorlano 66'	Report	Fernández 18'; Sialmas 90'

Pyrgos Stadium, Pyrgos
Referee: Kyros Vassaras (Thessaloniki)

8 November 2006
14:00 EET

Aiolikos	2–2 (a.e.t.)	Ergotelis
Mouratidis 23' (pen.); Manousos 58'	Report	Načevski 17', 21'
Penalties
	3–4

Mytilene Municipal Stadium, Mytilene
Referee: Vasilios Skoufitsas (Athens)

8 November 2006
17:00 EET

Olympiacos Volos	0–1	Iraklis
	Report	Herrera 27' (pen.)

Volos Municipal Stadium, Volos
Referee: Vasilis Terovitsas (Aetoloacarnania)

== Round of 16 ==
The draw took place on 16 November 2006.

=== Summary ===
Team 1	Score/Agg.	Team 2	Match	Replay
Niki Volos	0–1	Ilisiakos		
Chaidari	1–3	Olympiacos		
PAOK	1–0	Ergotelis		
Panathinaikos	1–1 (3–2 p)	Apollon Kalamarias	0–0	1–1 (a.e.t.)
Iraklis	1–3	PAS Giannina	1–1	0–2
Panionios	0–1	Skoda Xanthi		
OFI	2–4	AEL	1–1	1–3
Kerkyra	2–1	Ionikos	0–0	2–1

=== Matches ===
20 December 2006
13:30 EET

Niki Volos	0–1	Ilisiakos
	Report	Manoliadis 90+2'

Panthessaliko Stadium, Volos
Referee: Christos Apostolidis (Piraeus)

19 December 2006
19:00 EET

Chaidari	1–3	Olympiacos
Tournas 5'	Report	Pappas 36'; Borja 67'; Okkas 90+2'

Takis Charalambidis Stadium, Haidari
Referee: Anastasios Kakos (Corfu)

21 December 2006
17:45 EET

PAOK	1–0	Ergotelis
Tsigas 55'	Report

Toumba Stadium, Thessaloniki
Referee: Vasilios Pamporidis (Kilkis)

20 December 2006
17:45 EET

Panathinaikos	0–0	Apollon Kalamarias
	Report

Athens Olympic Stadium, Marousi
Referee: Ilias Mazarakos (Arta)

19 December 2006
15:00 EET

Iraklis	1–1	PAS Giannina
Diamantidis 7'	Report	Saitiotis 71'

Kaftanzoglio Stadium, Thessaloniki
Referee: Giorgos Daloukas (Thessaly)

20 December 2006
15:00 EET

Panionios	0–1	Skoda Xanthi
	Report	Barkoglou 34' (pen.)

Nea Smyrni Stadium, Nea Smyrni
Referee: Vasilis Terovitsas (Aetoloacarnania)

21 December 2006
19:00 EET

OFI	1–1	AEL
Ofori-Quaye 84'	Report	Aloneftis 48'

Theodoros Vardinogiannis Stadium, Heraklion
Referee: Konstantinos Papastamatis (Athens)

21 December 2006
13:30 EET

Kerkyra	0–0	Ionikos
	Report

Kerkyra Stadium, Corfu
Referee: Iraklis Tsikinis (Messinia)

==== Replay ====
10 January 2007
17:45 EET

Apollon Kalamarias	1–1 (a.e.t.)	Panathinaikos
Bushi 14'	Report	Papadopoulos 65'
Penalties
Favalli (penalty missed); Orfanos (penalty scored); Fytanidis (penalty missed); Galanopoulos (penalty scored); El Halwani (penalty missed)	2–3	(penalty missed) Sánchez; (penalty missed) Papadopoulos; (penalty scored) Morris; (penalty scored) Bóvio; (penalty scored) Salpingidis

Kalamaria Stadium, Thessaloniki
Referee: Romanos Kontogiannidis (Xanthi)

10 January 2007
15:00 EET

PAS Giannina	2–0	Iraklis
Kaznaferis 43'; Saitiotis 44'	Report

Zosimades Stadium, Ioannina
Referee: Christoforos Zografos (Athens)

11 January 2007
17:45 EET

AEL	3–1	OFI
Bassila 28'; Digozis 31'; Fotakis 66'	Report	Drulić 50'

Alcazar Stadium, Larissa
Referee: Kostas Finokaliotis (Athens)

11 January 2007
14:00 EET

Ionikos	1–2	Kerkyra
Bastianini 86'	Report	Koutsoures 17'; Tzavellas 41'

Neapoli Stadium, Nikaia
Referee: Michael Koukoulakis (Heraklion)

== Quarter-finals ==
The draw took place on 11 January 2007.

=== Summary ===
Team 1	Agg.	Team 2	1st leg	2nd leg
PAOK	3–4	Panathinaikos	2–1	1–3 (a.e.t.)
PAS Giannina	3–2	Olympiacos	2–0	1–2 (a.e.t.)
Ilisiakos	0–3	Skoda Xanthi	0–2	0–1
Kerkyra	0–2	AEL	0–0	0–2

=== Matches ===
17 January 2007
19:00 EET

PAOK	2–1	Panathinaikos
Konstantinidis 31'; Mięciel 42'	Report	Mantzios 62'

Toumba Stadium, Thessaloniki
Referee: Anastasios Kakos (Corfu)
31 January 2007
21:45 EET

Panathinaikos	3–1 (a.e.t.)	PAOK
Ivanschitz 40'; Mantzios 63', 95'	Report	Georgiadis 90'

Olympic Stadium, Marousi
Referee: Giorgos Kasnaferis (Athens)

Panathinaikos won 4–3 on aggregate.

17 January 2007
16:00 EET

PAS Giannina	2–0	Olympiacos
Kontogoulidis 32'; Domoraud 76'	Report

Zosimades Stadium, Ioannina
Referee: Lazaros Polatian (Pella)
31 January 2007
18:45 EET

Olympiacos	2–1 (a.e.t.)	PAS Giannina
Đorđević 61' (pen.); Babangida 73'	Report	Kontogoulidis 98'

Karaiskakis Stadium, Piraeus
Referee: Romanos Kontogiannidis (Xanthi)

PAS Giannina won 3–2 on aggregate.

17 January 2007
18:00 EET

Ilisiakos	0–2	Skoda Xanthi
	Report	Lambriakos 22'; Garpozis 74'

Grigoris Lambrakis Stadium, Zografou
Referee: Dimitris Kalopoulos (Thessaloniki)
31 January 2007
16:00 EET

Skoda Xanthi	1–0	Ilisiakos
Barkoglou 10'	Report

Skoda Xanthi Arena, Xanthi
Referee: Giorgos Zolotas (Thessaloniki)

Skoda Xanthi won 3–0 on aggregate.

24 January 2007
18:45 EET

Kerkyra	0–0	AEL
	Report

Kerkyra Stadium, Corfu
Referee: Giannis Tsachilidis (Piraeus)
31 January 2007
16:00 EET

AEL	2–0	Kerkyra
Kožlej 15', 92'	Report

Alkazar Stadium, Larissa
Referee: Christoforos Zografos (Athens)

AEL won 2–0 on aggregate.

== Semi-finals ==
The draw took place on 11 January 2007, after the quarter-final draw.

=== Summary ===
Team 1	Agg.	Team 2	1st leg	2nd leg
Panathinaikos	1–0	Skoda Xanthi	0–0	1–0
AEL	4–0	PAS Giannina	2–0	2–0

=== Matches ===
28 February 2007
19:00 EET

Panathinaikos	0–0	Skoda Xanthi
	Report

Olympic Stadium, Marousi
Referee: Dimitris Kalopoulos (Thessaloniki)
18 April 2007
16:00 EEST

Skoda Xanthi	0–1	Panathinaikos
	Report	Tziolis 5'

Skoda Xanthi Arena, Xanthi
Referee: Kyros Vassaras (Thessaloniki)

Panathinaikos won 1–0 on aggregate.

14 March 2007
19:00 EET

AEL	2–0	PAS Giannina
Antchouet 36', 52'	Report

Alkazar Stadium, Larissa
Referee: Makis Germanakos (Athens)
18 April 2007
19:00 EEST

PAS Giannina	0–2	AEL
	Report	Dasios 4' (o.g.); Aloneftis 29'

Zosimades Stadium, Ioannina
Referee: Dimitris Kalopoulos (Thessaloniki)

AEL won 4–0 on aggregate.

== Final ==
5 May 2007
18:00 EEST

Panathinaikos	1–2	AEL
Papadopoulos 44' (pen.)	Report	Kožlej 3'; Antchouet 82'

Panthessaliko Stadium, Volos
Attendance: 18,111
Referee: Kyros Vassaras (Thessaloniki)

== Top scorers ==
Rank	Player	Club	Goals
1	(Greece) Georgios Saitiotis	PAS Giannina	4
2	(Greece) Panagiotis Spartalis	Diagoras	3
2	(Poland) Fabian Pawela	Thyella Patras	3
2	(Gabon) Henri Antchouet	AEL	3
2	(Cameroon) Edouard Oum Ndeki	Atsalenios	3
2	(Greece) Sakis Papavasiliou	Pierikos	3
2	(Greece) Lazaros Mouratidis	Aiolikos	3
2	(Greece) Evangelos Kontogoulidis	PAS Giannina	3
2	(Greece) Vangelis Mantzios	Panathinaikos	3
