= 2005–06 Gamma Ethniki =

Gamma Ethniki
- Season: 2005–06
- Champions: Asteras Tripolis (South); Agrotikos Asteras (North)
- Promoted: Asteras Tripolis; Ethnikos Piraeus Messiniakos; Agrotikos Asteras; PAS Giannina; Panthrakikos
- Relegated: Lilas Vasilikou; Keratsini; Ionia 2000 Chania; Achaiki; Kozani; Ptolemaida

The 2005–06 Gamma Ethniki was the 23rd season since the official establishment of the third tier of Greek football in 1983. Asteras Tripolis and Agrotikos Asteras were crowned champions in Southern and Northern Group respectively, thus winning promotion to Beta Ethniki. Ethnikos Piraeus, Messiniakos, PAS Giannina and Panthrakikos also won promotion due to expansion of Beta Ethniki from 16 to 18 teams.

Keratsini, Ionia 2000 Chania, Achaiki, Kozani and Ptolemaida were relegated to Delta Ethniki.

== Southern Group ==
=== League table ===
Location of teams in South Group of 2005–06 Gamma Ethniki

Pos	Team	Pld	W	D	L	GF	GA	GD	Pts	Promotion or relegation
1	Asteras Tripolis (C, P)	32	22	7	3	56	19	+37	73	Promotion to Beta Ethniki
2	Ethnikos Piraeus (P)	32	18	12	2	44	14	+30	66	Promotion to Beta Ethniki
3	Messiniakos (P)	32	18	9	5	37	22	+15	63	Promotion to Beta Ethniki
4	Atsalenios	32	16	6	10	50	35	+15	54	
5	Lilas Vasilikou (Note: At the end of the season Enosi Lila Vasilikou-Chalkida was dissolved.) (R)	32	14	7	11	46	31	+15	49	Relegation to Delta Ethniki
6	Thyella Patras	32	13	9	10	35	33	+2	48	
7	Panetolikos	32	12	9	11	33	27	+6	45	
8	Diagoras	32	11	9	12	33	35	−2	42	
9	Acharnaikos	32	11	9	12	34	39	−5	42	
10	Rodos	32	11	7	14	35	33	+2	40	
11	Aiolikos	32	9	12	11	27	34	−7	39	
12	Agios Dimitrios	32	8	13	11	27	31	−4	37	
13	Vyzas	32	8	12	12	24	33	−9	36	
14	Apollon Smyrnis	32	9	7	16	23	43	−20	34	
15	Keratsini (R)	32	4	11	17	19	43	−24	23	Relegation to Delta Ethniki
16	Ionia 2000 Chania (R)	32	6	7	19	30	58	−28	25	Relegation to Delta Ethniki
17	Achaiki (Note: Achaiki had one nihilism and 3 points deducted.) (R)	32	4	8	20	22	50	−28	17	Relegation to Delta Ethniki

(C) Champions; (P) Promoted; (R) Relegated

=== Results ===
Home \ Away	AHA	ACH	AGD	AIO	APS	AST	ATS	DIA	ETH	ION	KER	LIL	MES	PAN	ROD	THY	VYZ
Achaiki		0–3	2–0	1–2	2–1	1–4	2–2	3–3	0–1	0–0	0–1	2–1	0–3	1–1	0–1	1–2	0–3
Acharnaikos	2–1		3–0	1–2	0–1	1–1	0–0	4–2	1–1	2–1	1–0	1–0	1–1	1–1	2–1	1–0	1–0
Agios Dimitrios	1–1	2–1		1–0	2–0	3–2	3–0	1–2	0–1	1–1	1–1	0–0	1–2	1–0	1–0	3–0	1–1
Aiolikos	3–0	2–0	1–1		1–2	0–1	2–0	0–2	1–1	4–1	0–0	0–3	2–0	2–0	1–0	1–1	4–1
Apollon Smyrnis	1–0	1–0	0–0	2–0		0–1	3–0	0–1	0–1	1–0	0–0	0–3	1–1	0–3	2–1	2–0	0–0
Asteras Tripolis	2–0	3–0	2–0	1–0	6–2		4–0	0–0	0–0	3–0	3–0	2–1	1–1	2–1	1–0	3–3	2–0
Atsalenios	3–0	4–0	1–0	3–0	4–0	1–0		2–0	1–0	3–1	1–0	1–1	4–0	2–0	2–2	3–1	3–0
Diagoras	2–2	0–1	0–0	1–0	0–0	0–1	2–1		0–1	1–0	0–0	2–0	1–1	0–0	2–1	0–1	0–1
Ethnikos Piraeus	0–0	2–1	3–0	2–0	0–0	1–1	3–0	1–2		3–0	3–0	4–1	1–1	1–0	2–2	2–0	1–0
Ionia 2000 Chania	4–1	2–2	2–2	1–0	2–1	0–1	2–1	2–1	0–1		2–2	0–2	1–2	0–1	4–2	0–2	0–0
Keratsini	0–1	1–0	1–1	0–1	1–1	0–1	1–4	0–2	0–3	2–1		3–2	0–0	0–0	1–1	0–2	3–0
Lilas Vasilikou	2–0	0–0	1–1	2–0	4–0	0–0	1–0	3–2	1–2	3–1	3–1		1–3	1–0	1–0	5–1	1–0
Messiniakos	2–1	2–1	1–0	0–0	2–0	1–2	2–1	0–1	0–0	3–0	1–0	1–0		1–0	2–1	1–0	1–0
Panetolikos	1–0	2–0	1–0	3–2	3–1	2–0	2–1	1–0	1–1	5–0	1–0	0–0	0–1		1–1	1–4	1–1
Rodos	1–0	3–2	0–0	2–2	2–1	0–3	0–1	4–1	1–1	2–0	4–1	1–0	0–0	0–0		1–0	1–1
Thyella Patras	0–0	1–1	1–0	1–0	2–0	1–2	0–0	1–0	0–1	2–2	0–0	2–1	1–0	2–1	0–0		3–0
Vyzas	2–0	1–2	0–0	0–0	1–0	0–1	2–2	3–2	0–0	2–0	3–0	1–1	0–2	1–0	0–0	1–1	

Legend: Blue = home team win; Yellow = draw; Red = away team win.

== Northern Group ==
=== League table ===
Location of teams in North Group of 2005–06 Gamma Ethniki

Pos	Team	Pld	W	D	L	GF	GA	GD	Pts	Promotion or relegation
1	Agrotikos Asteras (C, P)	30	21	7	2	63	18	+45	70	Promotion to Beta Ethniki
2	PAS Giannina (P)	30	20	8	2	57	13	+44	68	Promotion to Beta Ethniki
3	Panthrakikos (P)	30	19	9	2	44	21	+23	66	Promotion to Beta Ethniki
4	Pierikos	30	12	10	8	42	30	+12	46	
5	AE Giannena	30	12	8	10	31	22	+9	44	
6	Doxa Drama	30	11	10	9	41	36	+5	43	
7	Kavala	30	12	4	14	24	34	−10	40	
8	Anagennisi Arta	30	9	11	10	31	33	−2	38	
9	Enosi Thraki	30	11	5	14	33	37	−4	38	
10	Thermaikos	30	9	7	14	32	41	−9	34	
11	Anagennisi Karditsa	30	8	9	13	20	34	−14	33	
12	Trikala	30	7	9	14	32	42	−10	30	
13	Lamia	30	7	9	14	26	37	−11	30	
14	Polykastro	30	7	8	15	24	47	−23	29	
15	Kozani (R)	30	7	7	16	33	52	−19	28	Relegation to Delta Ethniki
16	Ptolemaida (R)	30	4	7	19	21	59	−38	19	Relegation to Delta Ethniki

(C) Champions; (P) Promoted; (R) Relegated

=== Results ===
Home \ Away	AEG	AGR	ART	KRD	DOX	EAL	KAV	KOZ	LAM	PTH	PAS	PIE	POL	PTO	THE	TRI
AE Giannena		0–1	0–2	2–0	0–0	0–0	1–0	0–1	1–0	1–1	0–2	1–2	1–0	2–0	3–0	2–0
Agrotikos Asteras	2–1		6–2	1–0	4–0	4–0	5–1	0–0	2–0	2–1	0–0	2–1	4–1	4–0	2–0	2–0
Anagennisi Arta	1–1	0–0		0–0	1–1	1–1	2–0	4–0	2–0	0–2	0–2	1–1	1–1	3–0	0–1	1–0
Anagennisi Karditsa	1–1	1–0	1–0		0–2	1–0	0–0	0–2	2–0	1–1	0–0	0–1	0–0	2–0	3–1	1–0
Doxa Drama	0–0	1–1	0–0	3–0		1–0	1–1	3–1	1–1	0–1	0–3	2–1	4–0	4–1	1–2	1–5
Enosi Trace	0–0	0–1	1–0	4–0	1–0		4–2	1–0	0–1	1–2	1–0	0–0	4–2	1–0	4–3	2–1
Kavala	1–0	1–2	2–0	1–2	1–1	1–0		1–0	2–1	0–1	1–0	0–0	2–0	0–1	1–0	1–0
Kozani	1–2	2–4	1–2	2–1	4–4	1–2	2–0		1–0	0–1	2–2	2–2	1–1	1–0	2–1	1–2
Lamia	1–3	0–0	1–0	1–1	0–2	2–0	0–1	3–2		0–0	0–2	0–0	1–0	6–3	2–0	0–0
Panthrakikos	1–0	1–1	3–3	2–1	2–1	3–1	1–0	2–0	3–1		1–1	2–1	1–1	2–0	2–1	0–0
PAS Giannina	2–0	1–1	2–0	3–0	3–1	1–0	3–0	6–0	1–0	1–0		1–1	5–0	2–0	3–1	2–1
Pierikos	0–0	2–1	1–2	1–1	1–3	3–2	2–0	3–1	3–1	1–1	0–1		2–0	4–0	1–0	3–1
Polykastro	0–3	0–1	0–1	3–0	0–0	2–1	1–2	2–1	1–0	0–1	1–2	1–0		3–2	0–0	1–0
Ptolemaida	0–3	0–2	2–2	2–1	1–2	0–0	1–2	0–0	1–1	0–2	0–4	1–1	2–0		1–3	1–1
Thermaikos	0–2	2–3	3–0	1–0	0–2	3–2	1–0	1–1	1–1	0–1	1–1	2–0	1–1	0–0		2–1
Trikala	3–1	0–5	0–0	0–0	1–0	2–0	2–0	2–1	2–2	2–3	1–1	1–4	2–2	1–2	1–1	

Legend: Blue = home team win; Yellow = draw; Red = away team win.
