= 2008–09 Gamma Ethniki =

Gamma Ethniki
- Season: 2008–09
- Champions: Ilioupoli (South); Doxa Drama (North)
- Promoted: Ilioupoli; Rodos; Doxa Drama; Panetolikos
- Relegated: Fostiras; Koropi; Agios Dimitrios; Asteras Rethymnou; Aiolikos; Lamia; PAS Preveza; Ethnikos Katerini; Anagennisi Arta; Enossi Alexandroupoli

The 2008–09 Gamma Ethniki was the 26th season since the official establishment of the third tier of Greek football in 1983. It started on September 14, 2008 and finished on May 3, 2009. 36 teams contest the league, divided into two groups of 18 clubs each, using certain geographical criteria. 23 of the participant clubs have contested in the 2007-08 season, 3 of them have been relegated from Beta Ethniki, while 10 of them have been promoted from Delta Ethniki. Last season's champions of North Group were Kavala, and Diagoras of South Group.

== Participant clubs ==
Following clubs were relegated from Beta Ethniki last season:

- Egaleo
- Chaidari
- Agios Dimitrios

Following clubs secured a place in Gamma Ethniki by avoiding relegation or by failing to win promotion:

- Aias Salamina
- ~~Aiolikos~~ (withdrew)
- Neos Asteras Rethymno
- Atsalenios
- Fostiras
- Ilioupoli
- Korinthos
- Koropi
- Panachaiki
- Rodos
- Vyzas
- ~~Alexandroupoli Enosi~~ (dismissed)
- ~~Anagennisi Arta~~ (withdrew)
- Anagennisi Giannitsa
- Doxa Drama (taking the place of Ethnikos Olympiacos Volos after the two Olympiacos Volos clubs' merger in summer 2008)
- Eordaikos 2007
- Ethnikos Katerini
- Lamia
- Neoi Epivates
- Niki Volos
- Panetolikos
- Preveza
- Thermaikos

Following clubs were promoted to Gamma Ethniki as champions of their respective Delta Ethniki groups:

- Odysseas Anagennisi
- Makedonikos Neapoli
- Pyrsos
- Ethnikos Filippiada
- Fokikos
- Zakynthos
- Panargiakos
- Agia Paraskevi
- Keravnos Keratea
- Olympiakos Hersonissos

=== Separation into groups ===
The afore mentioned clubs were divided into two groups depending on their geographical origin. Most of the clubs that come from the southern part of the country (including Attica, Peloponnesus, Crete, the Aegean Islands and half Sterea Ellada) will enter South Group 1, while clubs from Central and Northern Greece (including Macedonia, Thrace, Epirus, Thessaly, the Ionian Islands and part of Sterea Ellada) will take part in North Group 2.

== Southern Group ==
=== League table ===
Location of teams in South Group of 2008–09 Gamma Ethniki

Pos	Team	Pld	W	D	L	GF	GA	GD	Pts	Promotion or relegation
1	Ilioupoli (C, P)	34	25	3	6	63	23	+40	78	Promotion to Beta Ethniki
2	Rodos (Note: Rodos earned the promotion due to the relegation of Apollon Kalamarias from the Beta Ethniki.) (P)	34	22	11	1	56	19	+37	77	Qualification for Promotion play-off
3	Panachaiki	34	22	9	3	48	19	+29	75	
4	Fostiras (Note: Fostiras relegated to Delta Ethniki due to unsettled debts.) (R)	34	18	8	8	47	30	+17	59	Relegation to Delta Ethniki
5	Korinthos	34	12	12	10	41	34	+7	48	
6	Keravnos Keratea	34	14	5	15	37	32	+5	47	
7	Panargiakos	33	13	7	13	40	39	+1	46	
8	Agia Paraskevi	34	11	13	10	43	43	0	46	
9	Vyzas	34	12	9	13	39	33	+6	45	
10	Olympiakos Hersonissos	34	11	9	14	39	36	+3	42	
11	Atsalenios	34	11	9	14	31	30	+1	42	
12	Aias Salaminas	34	11	9	14	36	40	−4	42	
13	Chaidari	34	10	9	15	27	34	−7	39	
14	Koropi (R)	34	8	15	11	23	25	−2	39	Relegation to Delta Ethniki
15	Agios Dimitrios (R)	34	11	6	17	39	52	−13	39	Relegation to Delta Ethniki
16	Asteras Rethymnou (R)	34	8	12	14	31	44	−13	33	Relegation to Delta Ethniki
17	Egaleo (R)	33	4	8	21	31	70	−39	20	Merged with Ilisiakos and entered the Beta Ethniki (Note: Egaleo merged with Ilisiakos in Beta Ethniki at the time after their relegation to Delta Ethniki and renamed to Egaleo A.O.)
18	Aiolikos (Note: Aiolikos has withdrawn from the league due to financial problems. All their remaining matches will be award 3-0 for their opponents.) (R)	34	4	2	28	13	81	−68	14	Relegation to Delta Ethniki

(C) Champions; (P) Promoted; (R) Relegated

=== Results ===
Home \ Away	AGP	AGD	AIA	AIO	ATS	CHA	CHE	EGA	FOS	ILI	KER	KOR	KRP	NAR	PGE	PRG	ROD	VYZ
Agia Paraskevi		1–0	3–2	3–0	0–0	1–0	3–0	3–1	1–2	1–2	2–0	1–1	1–1	3–1	1–1	1–1	1–1	2–1
Agios Dimitrios	0–0		2–0	3–0	2–1	2–1	1–0	0–0	2–0	2–6	0–4	1–2	2–1	2–1	1–2	2–2	2–3	0–1
Aias Salamina	3–0	2–0		3–0	1–0	1–2	2–1	2–1	1–1	2–0	2–0	1–3	0–0	2–2	0–0	2–0	2–2	1–0
Aiolikos	0–3	0–3	0–3		0–2	0–3	0–3	0–3	0–3	0–3	0–3	0–3	0–3	0–1	1–2	0–3	0–3	0–3
Atsalenios	0–1	0–1	2–1	3–0		1–0	1–1	3–1	3–1	1–2	3–0	1–0	0–0	1–0	1–1	2–0	0–2	1–2
Chaidari	0–0	2–1	0–0	3–0	0–0		2–0	4–2	0–1	2–1	1–0	0–1	1–0	2–0	0–0	2–1	1–1	0–0
Chersonissos	3–3	3–0	1–0	3–0	1–1	3–0		3–0	2–1	1–0	0–0	3–1	0–0	1–1	0–1	2–1	0–2	2–0
Egaleo	4–4	1–1	3–1	3–2	1–0	0–2	0–4		0–2	0–2	0–1	2–2	1–2	1–3	0–2	0–3	1–1	0–3
Fostiras	3–1	2–1	2–1	4–1	1–0	2–0	2–0	0–0		0–3	2–1	1–1	1–1	2–0	2–1	4–1	0–0	1–1
Ilioupoli	3–1	2–1	3–0	3–0	2–1	3–0	1–0	4–1	2–0		2–0	3–1	3–0	1–1	1–1	2–0	2–1	1–0
Keravnos Keratea	4–1	3–1	1–0	3–0	0–0	1–0	2–0	2–0	0–1	0–2		0–0	1–0	0–0	0–1	3–1	0–2	1–2
Korinthos	1–2	1–1	0–1	3–0	1–1	2–0	2–2	0–0	1–0	2–0	0–1		2–0	3–2	0–1	2–0	1–2	2–1
Koropi	2–0	1–0	0–0	1–0	0–1	1–1	–	0–0	1–2	1–2	0–0	1–1		3–0	2–2	1–0	0–0	0–0
Neos Asteras Rethymno	0–0	1–0	2–0	3–0	0–0	1–1	1–0	4–2	0–2	0–1	2–1	0–0	0–0		0–1	2–2	0–3	1–1
Panachaiki	2–1	3–1	1–1	3–0	2–1	2–1	2–0	2–0	1–0	1–0	1–0	3–0	1–0	4–0		1–2	0–0	2–0
Panargiakos	1–0	1–2	1–0	3–0	1–0	1–1	1–0	4–2	0–0	1–3	2–1	0–0	1–0	3–1	3–0		1–1	2–0
Rodos	2–0	3–0	3–1	2–1	3–0	1–0	1–0	3–0	2–1	0–0	2–1	1–1	2–0	2–1	0–0	1–0		2–1
Vyzas Megara	0–0	2–2	3–0	2–0	2–0	3–1	1–1	4–1	1–1	0–1	2–3	2–1	0–1	0–0	0–1	1–0	1–2	

Legend: Blue = home team win; Yellow = draw; Red = away team win.

=== Top scorers ===
Rank	Name	Club	Goals
1	(Greece) Giorgos Zacharopoulos	Fostiras	24
2	(Greece) Georgios Trichias	Rodos	18
2	(Greece) Κimonas Evaggelatos	Agios Dimitrios	18
4	(Greece) Michalis Nikolopoulos	Ilioupoli	15
5	(Albania) Mario Gurma	Panachaiki	12

== Northern Group ==
=== League table ===
Location of teams in North Group of 2008–09 Gamma Ethniki

Pos	Team	Pld	W	D	L	GF	GA	GD	Pts	Promotion or relegation
1	Doxa Drama (C, P)	34	22	10	2	68	22	+46	76	Promotion to Beta Ethniki
2	Panetolikos (P)	34	21	7	6	56	14	+42	70	Qualification for Promotion play-off
3	Eordaikos	34	17	14	3	46	18	+28	65	
4	Makedonikos	34	14	14	6	47	25	+22	56	
5	PAONE	34	13	13	8	41	26	+15	52	
6	Zakynthos	34	14	9	11	36	28	+8	51	
7	Niki Volos	34	13	10	11	32	26	+6	49	
8	Thermaikos Thermi	34	13	8	13	46	40	+6	47	
9	Odysseas Anegennisi	34	12	11	11	35	30	+5	47	
10	Fokikos	34	12	11	11	38	34	+4	47	
11	Ethnikos Filippiada	34	12	11	11	33	35	−2	47	
12	Pyrsos Grevena	34	11	13	10	37	28	+9	46	
13	Anagennisi Giannitsa	34	12	9	13	32	38	−6	45	
14	Lamia (R)	34	10	12	12	33	34	−1	42	Relegation to Delta Ethniki
15	PAS Preveza (R)	34	9	12	13	21	27	−6	39	Relegation to Delta Ethniki
16	Ethnikos Katerini (R)	34	6	3	25	24	67	−43	21	Relegation to Delta Ethniki
17	Anagennisi Arta (Note: Anagennisi Arta has withdrawn from this competition.) (R)	34	4	5	25	15	76	−61	17	Relegation to Delta Ethniki
18	Enossi Alexandroupoli (Note: Enossi Alexandroupoli has been expelled from this competition and all their wins and draws were converted into 3-0 wins for their opponents (original losses stand as scored). In all likelihood, all their remaining matches will be awarded to their opponents 3-0.) (R)	34	4	2	28	9	81	−72	14	Relegation to Delta Ethniki

(C) Champions; (P) Promoted; (R) Relegated

=== Results ===
Home \ Away	ART	GIA	DOX	EAL	EOR	ETF	ETK	FOK	LAM	MKD	NIK	ODY	PNE	PAN	PRE	PYR	THE	ZAK
Anagennisi Arta		0–3	0–3	3–0	0–1	2–2	0–3	2–0	0–0	0–2	0–3	0–3	0–3	1–1	0–3	0–3	1–2	0–3
Anagennisi Giannitsa	0–0		0–0	3–0	0–2	0–1	1–0	0–0	1–0	1–3	1–0	1–2	1–0	0–3	0–2	1–0	2–1	1–0
Doxa Drama	4–0	4–1		4–0	3–3	4–1	3–0	1–1	2–0	1–0	2–0	3–1	1–0	2–1	0–0	0–0	2–0	2–0
Enosi Alexandroupoli	0–3	0–3	0–3		0–2	0–1	0–3	0–3	0–3	0–3	0–3	0–3	0–3	0–3	0–3	0–3	0–3	0–3
Eordaikos	3–0	2–1	3–3	3–0		4–1	1–0	4–0	3–1	0–0	2–2	1–0	2–0	1–0	1–0	2–0	–	1–1
Ethnikos Filippiada	1–0	1–1	1–1	3–0	1–0		3–0	1–0	3–1	1–3	1–0	0–0	0–0	1–3	1–0	1–1	2–0	0–0
Ethnikos Katerini	0–2	0–1	0–4	3–0	1–1	0–4		0–2	0–2	0–4	4–1	0–1	1–3	0–2	2–0	1–1	2–4	0–1
Fokikos	3–0	3–1	1–2	3–0	0–0	1–1	2–0		2–2	1–2	3–1	2–1	0–0	2–1	2–1	2–1	2–0	1–2
Lamia	3–0	0–4	0–1	3–1	0–0	3–0	3–0	0–0		2–3	0–0	0–0	2–0	0–0	2–1	0–3	3–1	1–1
Makedonikos	8–0	2–1	0–0	3–1	0–0	1–0	0–1	2–1	0–0		0–0	1–1	0–1	0–0	1–0	1–1	1–1	2–2
Niki Volos	2–0	0–0	0–1	3–0	0–0	2–0	1–0	1–0	0–0	0–0		1–2	0–1	2–1	1–0	1–1	3–0	1–0
Odysseas Anagennisi	4–0	2–3	0–4	2–1	0–1	0–0	3–0	0–0	1–0	1–1	2–0		0–1	0–0	0–0	2–0	0–1	1–0
PAONE	3–1	1–1	2–3	3–0	0–0	1–1	4–0	4–1	0–0	1–1	0–0	2–2		0–0	2–0	0–0	3–1	2–1
Panetolikos	3–0	4–0	1–0	2–0	1–0	2–1	5–0	3–0	3–0	2–0	2–0	0–0	3–1		3–0	2–1	1–0	2–0
PAS Preveza	3–0	0–0	0–2	3–0	0–0	1–0	0–0	0–0	1–0	2–0	1–0	0–0	0–0	2–1		1–1	1–0	0–0
Pyrsos Grevena	0–0	0–0	1–1	3–0	0–0	3–0	4–1	1–0	0–1	3–1	0–0	3–0	1–1	0–1	1–0		0–4	1–0
Thermaikos	3–0	1–1	5–2	3–0	1–2	0–0	2–1	0–0	2–2	0–0	1–2	2–1	1–2	0–0	3–1	2–0		2–1
Zakynthos	3–0	2–1	0–0	3–0	1–1	1–0	3–2	0–0	1–0	0–2	1–2	2–0	1–0	1–0	0–0	2–0	3–2	

Legend: Blue = home team win; Yellow = draw; Red = away team win.

=== Top scorers ===
Rank	Name	Club	Goals
1	(Greece) Ioannis Katsaros	Makedonikos	11
2	(Greece) Lazaros Mouratidis	Doxa Drama	10
3	(Greece) Petros Zouroudis	Panetolikos	9
3	(Greece) Christos Karagiannis	Eordaikos	9
3	(Greece) Konstantinos Aggos	Doxa Drama	9
3	(Greece) Panagiotis Bris	Fokikos	9
3	(Greece) Stavros Tsoukalas	Doxa Drama	9

== Play-off match ==
23 May 2009
17:00 EEST

Rodos	1–2	Panetolikos
Romanczouk 6' (pen.)		Karamalikis 82'; Paleologos 90+6'

Nea Smyrni Stadium, Nea Smyrni
Attendance: 11,000
Referee: Michael Koukoulakis (Heraklion)

Rodos
Panetolikos

RODOS:
GK	99	(Greece) Antonis Panagiotopoulos
DF	5	(Greece) Theopistos Papadopoulos (c)
DF	30	(Greece) Georgios Zacharatos
DF	2	(Greece) Nikitas Maliakas
DF	37	(Greece) Kostas Meresiotis	(substituted off) 69'
MF	22	(Greece) Dimitrios Chaloulos
MF	23	(Poland) Bartoz Romanczouk	(substituted off) 69'
MF	20	(Greece) Paulos Gigani	(substituted off) 81'
MF	11	(Greece) Nikitaras Pelekis
FW	31	(Greece) Georgios Trichias
FW	10	(Greece) Dionisis Liosatos
Substitutes:
DF	47	(Greece) Nikos Antoniou	(substituted on) 60'
MF	27	(Greece) Reisis Mailis	(substituted on) 69'
DF	4	(Greece) Thomas Bibiris	(substituted on) 81'
Manager:
(Greece) Dimitris Spanos

PANETOLIKOS:
GK	89	(Greece) Nikos Babaniotis
DF	30	(Greece) Christos Naintos (c)	(yellow card) 52'	(substituted off) 78'
DF	33	(Greece) Theodosis Theodosiadis	(yellow card) 67'
DF	77	(Greece) Michalis Bakakis		(substituted off) 70'
DF	16	(Greece) Periklis Papapostolou
MF	7	(Greece) Makis Belevonis	(yellow card) 43'	(substituted off) 54'
MF	19	(Greece) Thanasis Paleologos
MF	20	(Greece) Tasos Dentsas
MF	81	(Greece) Stathis Karamalikis
MF	6	(Greece) Hussein Mumin
FW	38	(Portugal) Chiquinho Delgado
Substitutes:
FW	9	(Greece) Petros Zouroudis		(substituted on) 78'
DF	32	(Greece) Charalabos Charalabakis		(substituted on) 70'
FW	18	(Greece) Panagiotis Zorbas		(substituted on) 54'
Manager:
(Greece) Vasilis Delaperas
