= 2006–07 Gamma Ethniki =

Gamma Ethniki
- Season: 2006–07
- Champions: Agios Dimitrios (South); Pierikos (North)
- Promoted: Agios Dimitrios; Pierikos; ASK Olympiacos
- Relegated: Apollon Smyrnis; Paniliakos; OF Ierapetra; PAO Varda; Zakynthos; Trikala; Androutsos Gravia; Nafpaktiakos Asteras; Doxa Gratini

The 2006–07 Gamma Ethniki was the 24th season since the official establishment of the third tier of Greek football in 1983. Agios Dimitrios and Pierikos were crowned champions in South and North Group respectively, thus winning promotion to Beta Ethniki. ASK Olympiacos won the third promotion ticket after defeating Rodos 2-1 in a single play-off match at Municipal Ground of Peristeri between the two groups' second-placed teams.

Paniliakos, OF Ierapetra, PAO Varda, Zakynthos, Androutsos Gravia, Nafpaktiakos Asteras and Doxa Gratini were finally relegated to Delta Ethniki or the Regional Championship.

The highlight of the season was a match in penultimate round in which Apollon Smyrni's fans made serious incidents against Paniliakos. Therefore, were deducted 3 points and then was crucial to a relegation of Apollon to Delta Ethniki after many years of competing in the top leagues.

== Southern Group ==
=== League table ===
Location of teams in South Group of 2006–07 Gamma Ethniki

| Pos | Team | Pld | W | D | L | GF | GA | GD | Pts | Promotion or relegation |
|---|---|---|---|---|---|---|---|---|---|---|
| 1 | Agios Dimitrios (C, P) | 34 | 20 | 11 | 3 | 56 | 28 | +28 | 71 | Promotion to Beta Ethniki |
| 2 | Rodos | 34 | 20 | 9 | 5 | 51 | 20 | +31 | 69 | Qualification for Promotion play-off |
| 3 | Atsalenios | 34 | 17 | 11 | 6 | 52 | 32 | +20 | 62 | |
| 4 | Panetolikos | 34 | 15 | 13 | 6 | 52 | 32 | +20 | 58 | |
| 5 | Diagoras | 34 | 16 | 10 | 8 | 49 | 33 | +16 | 58 | |
| 6 | Ilioupoli | 34 | 12 | 15 | 7 | 47 | 35 | +12 | 51 | |
| 7 | Thyella Patras | 34 | 14 | 9 | 11 | 42 | 36 | +6 | 51 | |
| 8 | Vyzas | 34 | 15 | 6 | 13 | 49 | 44 | +5 | 51 | |
| 9 | Koropi | 34 | 13 | 10 | 11 | 43 | 45 | −2 | 49 | |
| 10 | Panachaiki | 34 | 12 | 12 | 10 | 39 | 29 | +10 | 48 | |
| 11 | Acharnaikos | 34 | 12 | 6 | 16 | 29 | 36 | −7 | 42 | |
| 12 | Thiva | 34 | 9 | 13 | 12 | 43 | 46 | −3 | 40 | |
| 13 | Aiolikos | 34 | 11 | 6 | 17 | 43 | 51 | −8 | 39 | |
| 14 | Apollon Smyrnis (Note: Apollon Smyrnis had 3 points deducted after crowd troubles in match of penultimate round against Paniliakos.) (R) | 34 | 10 | 7 | 17 | 37 | 52 | −15 | 34 | Relegation to Delta Ethniki |
| 15 | Paniliakos (R) | 34 | 9 | 6 | 19 | 39 | 56 | −17 | 33 | Relegation to Delta Ethniki |
| 16 | OF Ierapetra (R) | 34 | 9 | 5 | 20 | 28 | 36 | −8 | 32 | Relegation to Delta Ethniki |
| 17 | PAO Varda (R) | 34 | 7 | 7 | 20 | 23 | 52 | −29 | 28 | Relegation to Delta Ethniki |
| 18 | Zakynthos (R) | 34 | 3 | 8 | 23 | 14 | 58 | −44 | 17 | Relegation to Delta Ethniki |

(C) Champions; (P) Promoted; (R) Relegated

=== Results ===
| Home \ Away | ACH | AGD | AIO | APS | ATS | DIA | ILI | AOK | OIP | PCK | PAN | PNL | PAO | ROD | THI | THY | VYZ | ZAK |
|---|---|---|---|---|---|---|---|---|---|---|---|---|---|---|---|---|---|---|
| Acharnaikos | | 0–0 | 1–0 | 1–0 | 0–1 | 1–4 | 1–1 | 1–1 | 2–1 | 0–0 | 1–2 | 1–0 | 1–0 | 0–2 | 2–1 | 1–0 | 1–0 | 2–0 |
| Agios Dimitrios | 2–1 | | 2–0 | 2–1 | 1–3 | 1–3 | 1–1 | 2–0 | 3–0 | 3–2 | 2–2 | 2–0 | 1–0 | 1–1 | 2–1 | 3–0 | 2–0 | 2–0 |
| Aiolikos | 1–2 | 1–4 | | 1–1 | 2–1 | 3–0 | 1–1 | 1–1 | 2–0 | 3–2 | 1–2 | 2–1 | 2–0 | 0–1 | 2–3 | 2–2 | 2–1 | 3–0 |
| Apollon Smyrnis | 0–0 | 1–3 | 2–4 | | 1–0 | 1–1 | 0–1 | 0–1 | 1–0 | 3–2 | 0–1 | 1–2 | 1–0 | 1–0 | 2–1 | 3–1 | 1–2 | 2–0 |
| Atsalenios | 1–0 | 1–1 | 3–0 | 3–1 | | 5–1 | 1–1 | 3–1 | 1–0 | 1–1 | 2–1 | 5–2 | 3–2 | 1–0 | 2–2 | 1–1 | 2–1 | 2–0 |
| Diagoras | 1–0 | 4–0 | 1–0 | 2–2 | 2–0 | | 2–1 | 2–2 | 1–0 | 0–0 | 0–0 | 2–0 | 5–1 | 0–0 | 0–0 | 1–0 | 1–0 | 3–0 |
| Ilioupoli | 2–0 | 1–1 | 1–1 | 0–1 | 3–1 | 1–0 | | 2–0 | 4–0 | 1–1 | 1–0 | 2–0 | 0–1 | 0–2 | 1–1 | 3–2 | 2–2 | 3–1 |
| Koropi | 1–0 | 0–1 | 3–2 | 1–1 | 0–1 | 2–1 | 2–2 | | 2–1 | 2–0 | 2–2 | 3–2 | 2–1 | 2–0 | 0–0 | 1–0 | 1–2 | 2–2 |
| OF Ierapetra | 1–1 | 0–4 | 1–0 | 2–1 | 0–0 | 1–4 | 3–1 | 1–0 | | 2–1 | 2–2 | 1–3 | 1–0 | 1–1 | 1–2 | 1–2 | 2–1 | 0–0 |
| Panachaiki | 2–1 | 0–0 | 0–1 | 4–1 | 0–0 | 2–0 | 1–1 | 0–2 | 0–1 | | 1–0 | 2–0 | 1–0 | 2–1 | 1–0 | 2–0 | 2–0 | 5–0 |
| Panetolikos | 2–0 | 0–1 | 3–0 | 3–0 | 2–2 | 2–2 | 2–2 | 3–1 | 4–1 | 1–1 | | 3–0 | 2–0 | 0–0 | 3–2 | 3–0 | 2–0 | 2–1 |
| Paniliakos | 2–6 | 2–2 | 3–1 | 4–0 | 2–2 | 0–1 | 2–1 | 0–1 | 2–1 | 0–2 | 0–0 | | 2–0 | 0–0 | 1–1 | 0–1 | 0–1 | 4–0 |
| PAO Varda | 1–0 | 1–1 | 1–0 | 3–3 | 0–1 | 0–0 | 0–3 | 1–3 | 2–1 | 0–0 | 1–0 | 2–0 | | 1–2 | 1–1 | 0–3 | 0–0 | 1–0 |
| Rodos | 1–0 | 0–1 | 3–0 | 1–1 | 1–0 | 3–1 | 3–1 | 2–0 | 3–2 | 2–0 | 1–1 | 3–1 | 3–0 | | 5–3 | 1–0 | 2–0 | 2–0 |
| Thiva | 1–0 | 0–1 | 1–1 | 2–1 | 0–0 | 1–0 | 0–0 | 2–2 | 1–0 | 2–1 | 3–3 | 1–2 | 1–1 | 0–2 | | 0–0 | 2–3 | 4–1 |
| Thyella Patras | 0–1 | 2–2 | 1–0 | 1–0 | 1–0 | 0–0 | 1–1 | 1–0 | 2–0 | 0–0 | 1–1 | 3–1 | 6–1 | 0–0 | 3–2 | | 3–2 | 2–0 |
| Vyzas | 4–1 | 0–2 | 3–1 | 2–3 | 2–2 | 3–2 | 1–1 | 4–0 | 2–1 | 0–0 | 2–0 | 3–1 | 1–0 | 0–3 | 2–1 | 3–0 | | 2–1 |
| Zakynthos | 1–0 | 0–0 | 0–3 | 1–0 | 0–1 | 1–2 | 0–1 | 2–2 | 0–1 | 1–1 | 0–1 | 0–0 | 2–1 | 0–0 | 0–1 | 0–3 | 0–0 | |

Legend: Blue = home team win; Yellow = draw; Red = away team win.

== Northern Group ==
=== League table ===
Location of teams in North Group of 2006–07 Gamma Ethniki

| Pos | Team | Pld | W | D | L | GF | GA | GD | Pts | Promotion or relegation |
|---|---|---|---|---|---|---|---|---|---|---|
| 1 | Pierikos (C, P) | 32 | 23 | 6 | 3 | 64 | 23 | +41 | 75 | Promotion to Beta Ethniki |
| 2 | ASK Olympiacos (P) | 32 | 21 | 10 | 1 | 56 | 17 | +39 | 73 | Qualification for Promotion play-off |
| 3 | Thermaikos | 32 | 19 | 7 | 6 | 50 | 23 | +27 | 64 | |
| 4 | Lamia | 32 | 20 | 3 | 9 | 47 | 35 | +12 | 63 | |
| 5 | Kavala | 32 | 12 | 11 | 9 | 35 | 31 | +4 | 47 | |
| 6 | Anagennisi Karditsa | 32 | 12 | 9 | 11 | 35 | 34 | +1 | 45 | |
| 7 | Ethnikos Katerini | 32 | 12 | 6 | 14 | 35 | 40 | −5 | 42 | |
| 8 | Polykastro | 32 | 11 | 7 | 14 | 24 | 31 | −7 | 40 | |
| 9 | Enosi Thraki | 32 | 10 | 9 | 13 | 32 | 29 | +3 | 39 | |
| 10 | AE Giannena | 32 | 9 | 12 | 11 | 30 | 32 | −2 | 39 | |
| 11 | Doxa Drama | 32 | 8 | 14 | 10 | 22 | 26 | −4 | 38 | |
| 12 | PAONE | 32 | 11 | 5 | 16 | 32 | 36 | −4 | 38 | |
| 13 | Anagennisi Arta | 32 | 10 | 7 | 15 | 31 | 38 | −7 | 37 | |
| 14 | Trikala (R) | 32 | 9 | 9 | 14 | 32 | 42 | −10 | 36 | Relegation to Delta Ethniki |
| 15 | Androutsos Gravia (R) | 32 | 7 | 10 | 15 | 31 | 39 | −8 | 31 | Relegation to Delta Ethniki |
| 16 | Nafpaktiakos Asteras (R) | 32 | 6 | 6 | 20 | 23 | 51 | −28 | 24 | Relegation to Delta Ethniki |
| 17 | Doxa Gratini (R) | 32 | 4 | 5 | 23 | 19 | 71 | −52 | 17 | Relegation to Delta Ethniki |

(C) Champions; (P) Promoted; (R) Relegated

=== Results ===
| Home \ Away | AEG | ART | KRD | AND | DDR | DGR | EAL | ETH | KAV | LAM | NAP | ASK | PNE | PIE | POL | THE | TRI |
|---|---|---|---|---|---|---|---|---|---|---|---|---|---|---|---|---|---|
| AE Giannena | | 0–0 | 2–0 | 1–1 | 2–0 | 2–0 | 0–0 | 2–0 | 2–2 | 0–2 | 3–1 | 0–1 | 1–0 | 0–5 | 0–0 | 0–0 | 0–1 |
| Anagennisi Arta | 0–1 | | 0–3 | 2–1 | 2–2 | 1–0 | 0–0 | 0–2 | 1–0 | 2–1 | 2–0 | 0–1 | 1–0 | 2–3 | 2–0 | 0–1 | 1–1 |
| Anagennisi Karditsa | 2–1 | 2–2 | | 2–1 | 1–0 | 1–1 | 1–2 | 1–1 | 1–0 | 2–0 | 2–1 | 1–2 | 2–1 | 0–1 | 1–1 | 1–0 | 0–0 |
| Androutsos Gravia | 0–1 | 1–1 | 0–0 | | 1–0 | 3–1 | 2–1 | 1–1 | 1–2 | 1–2 | 2–1 | 0–2 | 1–0 | 1–1 | 0–1 | 1–1 | 1–1 |
| Doxa Drama | 1–1 | 1–0 | 0–0 | 1–1 | | 1–1 | 1–0 | 0–3 | 0–1 | 1–0 | 6–2 | 0–0 | 0–0 | 0–0 | 0–0 | 0–1 | 1–0 |
| Doxa Gratini | 0–4 | 0–4 | 2–1 | 0–3 | 0–1 | | 1–5 | 1–1 | 0–0 | 0–1 | 2–0 | 1–4 | 0–2 | 2–2 | 0–1 | 0–1 | 2–0 |
| Enosi Thraki | 1–1 | 0–2 | 0–1 | 4–2 | 0–1 | 3–0 | | 2–0 | 0–1 | 1–2 | 1–0 | 0–2 | 1–0 | 0–0 | 1–0 | 0–0 | 6–1 |
| Ethnikos Katerini | 1–0 | 1–2 | 2–1 | 1–0 | 1–1 | 4–0 | 2–1 | | 1–1 | 1–2 | 4–0 | 2–4 | 0–2 | 1–3 | 1–0 | 0–1 | 1–0 |
| Kavala | 1–0 | 2–1 | 2–1 | 0–0 | 0–0 | 6–1 | 0–0 | 1–0 | | 1–3 | 0–0 | 0–1 | 4–3 | 1–1 | 2–0 | 0–1 | 1–0 |
| Lamia | 2–1 | 1–0 | 1–0 | 1–1 | 2–1 | 3–0 | 2–0 | 2–0 | 3–0 | | 2–0 | 1–1 | 1–0 | 1–2 | 1–0 | 0–4 | 2–0 |
| Nafpaktiakos Asteras | 1–0 | 2–1 | 1–2 | 1–0 | 3–0 | 1–2 | 1–1 | 1–1 | 0–2 | 1–4 | | 1–1 | 1–0 | 1–0 | 0–1 | 0–4 | 0–1 |
| ASK Olympiacos | 1–0 | 5–1 | 1–1 | 1–0 | 1–1 | 1–0 | 0–0 | 3–0 | 1–1 | 4–0 | 2–1 | | 4–0 | 1–0 | 0–0 | 2–1 | 2–0 |
| PAONE | 0–0 | 1–0 | 2–1 | 1–0 | 0–0 | 3–1 | 0–1 | 0–1 | 2–0 | 1–1 | 0–0 | 1–3 | | 1–4 | 2–0 | 1–0 | 4–0 |
| Pierikos | 4–1 | 2–0 | 3–1 | 2–0 | 1–0 | 4–0 | 3–2 | 2–1 | 2–0 | 4–0 | 1–0 | 1–1 | 3–1 | | 4–2 | 1–0 | 3–2 |
| Polykastro | 0–0 | 2–0 | 0–1 | 3–1 | 0–0 | 2–0 | 2–1 | 0–1 | 1–0 | 0–2 | 2–1 | 1–1 | 1–3 | 0–1 | | 2–1 | 0–1 |
| Thermaikos | 3–3 | 1–0 | 1–1 | 2–4 | 2–1 | 2–0 | 1–0 | 3–0 | 2–2 | 3–0 | 1–0 | 2–0 | 2–1 | 1–0 | 3–0 | | 1–1 |
| Trikala | 1–1 | 1–1 | 3–1 | 1–0 | 0–1 | 4–0 | 0–0 | 3–0 | 2–2 | 3–2 | 1–1 | 0–3 | 2–0 | 0–1 | 0–2 | 2–4 | |

Legend: Blue = home team win; Yellow = draw; Red = away team win.

== Play-off match ==
17 June 2007

| Rodos | 1–2 | ASK Olympiacos |
|---|---|---|
| Korobokis 80' (pen.) | | Tsangaris 19'; Boudouris 73' (pen.) |

Peristeri Stadium, Peristeri
