= 2007–08 Gamma Ethniki =

Gamma Ethniki
- Season: 2007–08
- Champions: Diagoras (South); Kavala (North)
- Promoted: Diagoras; Kavala; Anagennisi Karditsa
- Relegated: Thyella Patras; Messiniakos; Panegialios; Acharnaikos; Thiva; Prosotsani; Polykastro; AE Giannena

The 2007–08 Gamma Ethniki was the 25th season since the official establishment of the third tier of Greek football in 1983. It started on September 23, 2007 and ended on June 8, 2008. Diagoras and Kavala were crowned champions in South and North Groups, respectively, thus winning promotion to Beta Ethniki. The third promotion ticket was gained by Anagennisi Karditsa, second-placed in North Group, after the win against Ilioupoli, second-placed in South, to the single play-off match which was held on June 14, 2008, at Georgios Kamaras Stadium.

Prosotsani, Polykastro, A.E. Giannena and Doxa Drama from North Group, and Thyella Patras, Messiniakos, Panegialios, Acharnaikos and Thiva from South were relegated to Delta Ethniki.

== Southern Group ==
Location of teams in South Group of 2007–08 Gamma Ethniki

=== League table ===
Pos	Team	Pld	W	D	L	GF	GA	GD	Pts	Promotion or relegation
1	Diagoras (C, P)	34	23	4	7	56	24	+32	73	Promotion to Beta Ethniki
2	Ilioupoli	34	21	8	5	61	32	+29	71	Qualification for Promotion play-off
3	Panetolikos	34	18	8	8	59	28	+31	62	
4	Korinthos	34	15	8	11	39	34	+5	53	
5	Panachaiki	34	14	9	11	42	29	+13	51	
6	Aiolikos	34	14	7	13	40	41	−1	49	
7	Rodos (Note: Rodos had 1 point deducted after failing to field at least 8 Greek players in home match against Thiva.)	34	13	9	12	31	27	+4	47	
8	Aias Salamina (Note: Aias Salamina had 1 point deducted after failing to field at least two U-21 players in home match against Koropi.)	34	13	9	12	42	47	−5	47	
9	Atsalenios	34	13	7	14	33	45	−12	46	
10	Fostiras	34	13	6	15	44	39	+5	45	
11	Vyzas	34	13	6	15	37	43	−6	45	
12	Neos Asteras Rethymno	34	12	8	14	38	41	−3	44	
13	Koropi	34	11	10	13	27	36	−9	43	
14	Thyella Patras (R)	34	9	14	11	24	37	−13	41	Relegation to Delta Ethniki
15	Messiniakos (R)	34	9	12	13	28	36	−8	39	Relegation to Delta Ethniki
16	Panegialios (R)	34	9	8	17	35	49	−14	35	Relegation to Delta Ethniki
17	Acharnaikos (R)	34	9	7	18	31	43	−12	34	Relegation to Delta Ethniki
18	Thiva (R)	34	3	8	23	24	60	−36	17	Relegation to Delta Ethniki

(C) Champions; (P) Promoted; (R) Relegated

=== Results ===
Home \ Away	ACH	AIA	AIO	ATS	DIA	FOS	ILI	KOR	AOK	MES	NAS	PGE	EGI	PAN	ROD	THI	THY	VYZ
Acharnaikos		2–2	1–2	1–1	0–3	2–0	0–0	1–2	0–0	2–0	2–1	0–2	1–0	1–2	2–1	2–0	0–0	2–1
Aias Salamina	0–1		4–0	3–1	1–1	0–0	1–1	2–0	1–0	3–2	3–1	1–0	1–0	0–4	0–0	3–1	2–0	2–1
Aiolikos	2–1	3–1		0–0	1–0	3–2	2–3	3–0	0–0	0–2	0–2	0–1	3–0	1–1	1–1	1–0	1–1	3–1
Atsalenios	1–0	2–1	1–0		0–2	1–2	0–1	3–1	0–0	1–1	1–0	1–0	1–0	3–2	1–0	2–1	2–3	3–1
Diagoras	1–0	3–0	3–0	2–0		2–1	2–0	1–0	5–1	3–0	1–0	2–1	1–0	2–1	2–1	5–0	1–1	1–0
Fostiras	2–0	5–0	4–0	3–1	0–1		2–0	1–0	1–0	2–1	2–2	0–0	0–1	3–3	2–1	4–3	4–0	2–1
Ilioupoli	5–3	3–0	2–0	2–0	2–2	2–0		1–0	2–1	3–0	2–0	4–0	2–1	0–0	1–1	3–1	3–0	4–2
Korinthos	1–0	1–0	4–0	2–1	2–1	1–0	1–2		2–2	1–1	1–0	1–1	0–1	1–0	2–0	2–0	3–1	1–0
Koropi	1–0	3–0 (Note: The match between Koropi and Aias Salamina, originally a 1-1 draw, was annulled, Koropi won the match 3-0 in cards and Aias Salamina had 1 point deducted after failing to field at least 2 U-21 players.)	1–2	1–1	1–0	1–0	0–1	0–3		2–0	2–3	1–1	2–1	1–0	0–2	3–0	1–0	1–0
Messiniakos	1–0	2–2	0–0	0–0	1–0	1–0	1–2	1–1	5–0		1–0	2–0	3–1	1–2	1–1	1–0	0–0	0–0
Neos Asteras Rethymno	3–1	1–1	2–1	1–0	3–1	2–0	0–0	2–1	0–0	2–0		1–1	0–1	1–0	2–0	0–0	3–1	1–3
Panachaiki	0–0	0–1	1–2	5–0	3–1	1–0	0–2	3–1	2–0	2–0	2–0		2–1	1–1	3–1	3–0	2–0	1–1
Panegialios	1–3	3–3	1–3	3–1	0–2	1–0	3–2	0–0	1–1	0–0	3–3	3–2		1–0	0–1	0–1	1–2	2–2
Panetolikos	1–0	1–0	0–0	4–2	0–0	1–0	6–3	4–0	2–0	2–1	2–0	0–1	4–0		1–0	3–0	2–0	3–0
Rodos	1–0	3–1	1–0	0–0	0–1	3–0	0–1	1–1	1–0	2–0	2–0	1–0	1–1	0–0		0–3 (Note: The match between Rodos and Thiva was annulled, Thiva won the match 0-3 in cards and Rodos had 1 point deducted after failing to field at least 8 Greek players.)	3–0	2–0
Thiva	2–2	1–3	0–0	0–1	0–2	1–1	1–1	0–2	0–1	2–0	0–1	0–0	0–3	3–3	0–0		0–1	1–2
Thyella Patras	2–0	0–0	1–0	0–1	3–1	0–0	1–1	1–1	0–0	0–0	0–0	0–0	0–0	2–1	0–0	3–2		2–1
Vyzas	2–1	1–0	1–3	3–0	0–1	1–0	1–0	0–0	0–0	0–0	4–3	1–0	2–1	0–3	2–0	1–0	2–0	

Legend: Blue = home team win; Yellow = draw; Red = away team win.

== Northern Group ==
Location of teams in North Group of 2007–08 Gamma Ethniki

=== League table ===
Pos	Team	Pld	W	D	L	GF	GA	GD	Pts	Promotion or relegation
1	Kavala (C, P)	32	21	9	2	49	18	+31	72	Promotion to Beta Ethniki
2	Anagennisi Karditsa (P)	32	19	6	7	44	19	+25	63	Qualification for Promotion play-off
3	PAONE	32	16	11	5	40	23	+17	59	
4	Olympiacos Volos	32	15	8	9	36	33	+3	53	
5	Thermaikos	32	14	10	8	42	31	+11	52	
6	Enosi Alexandroupoli	32	12	11	9	27	26	+1	47	
7	Preveza	32	12	9	11	38	28	+10	45	
8	Ethnikos Katerini	32	13	6	13	35	26	+9	45	
9	Anagennisi Giannitsa	32	12	9	11	46	38	+8	45	
10	Niki Volos	32	11	11	10	37	33	+4	44	
11	Eordaikos 2007	32	11	10	11	26	29	−3	43	
12	Anagennisi Arta	32	11	8	13	39	36	+3	41	
13	Lamia	32	9	13	10	30	31	−1	40	
14	Prosotsani (R)	32	7	12	13	28	38	−10	33	Relegation to Delta Ethniki
15	Polykastro (R)	32	8	7	17	26	40	−14	31	Relegation to Delta Ethniki
16	AE Giannena (R)	32	6	6	20	32	45	−13	24	Relegation to Delta Ethniki
17	Doxa Drama (Note: Forfeited due to financial problems after Matchday 7, but it was later readmitted to Gamma Ethniki taking the place of Ethnikos Olympiacos Volos after the two Olympiacos Volos clubs' merger in summer 2008.)	32	2	0	30	5	86	−81	−66	Spared from relegation

(C) Champions; (P) Promoted; (R) Relegated

=== Results ===
Home \ Away	AEG	ART	GIA	KRD	DOX	EAL	EOR	ETH	KAV	LAM	NIK	EOV	PNE	POL	PRE	PRO	THE
AE Giannena		1–1	0–3	0–1	3–0 (Note: Doxa Drama forfeited due to financial problems after Matchday 7. Since then all matches have been awarded to their opponents, with further deduction of three points for every cancelled match.)	1–2	2–0	1–1	1–2	1–1	2–0	1–2	0–2	0–0	2–2	2–3	7–2
Anagennisi Arta	2–1		4–0	0–6	3–0	0–1	0–0	0–1	0–0	0–0	1–2	0–0	0–0	4–0	1–0	0–0	2–1
Anagennisi Giannitsa	2–0	0–2		4–2	3–0	0–0	3–0	2–1	1–1	4–0	1–1	2–3	1–2	3–1	1–1	3–3	0–2
Anagennisi Karditsa	1–0	2–0	3–0		3–0	1–0	0–1	1–0	0–0	2–0	1–2	2–0	3–0	1–1	1–0	1–0	2–1
Doxa Drama	0–3	0–3	0–3	0–3		0–3	0–3	0–3	0–3	0–3	0–3	2–0	0–3	1–0	0–3	1–3	0–3
Enosi Alexandroupoli	1–0	2–4	0–1	1–0	3–0		0–0	1–1	2–0	1–0	1–1	0–1	2–1	1–0	0–0	1–0	3–1
Eordaikos 2007	2–0	1–2	1–1	0–2	1–0	1–1		1–0	1–0	1–0	0–0	1–1	1–0	2–0	3–1	0–0	1–1
Ethnikos Katerini	2–1	1–0	1–1	1–2	3–0	4–0	2–1		0–1	3–1	2–0	2–0	0–0	2–0	0–1	0–1	1–0
Kavala	1–0	2–1	2–1	2–0	1–0	0–0	3–0	2–0		1–1	2–1	3–0	2–2	2–0	2–1	2–1	2–1
Lamia	2–0	1–1	2–1	1–1	3–0	1–0	2–0	1–1	1–2		0–0	3–3	1–0	0–0	1–1	0–0	2–1
Niki Volos	3–1	2–1	1–2	1–2	3–0	0–0	1–0	3–1	0–2	1–0		1–1	0–0	3–2	2–2	1–0	1–1
Olympiacos Volos	1–0	4–1	0–1	0–1	3–0	1–1	0–0	1–0	1–3	2–0	2–1		1–0	1–0	1–3	3–1	1–0
PAONE	2–0	2–1	2–0	2–1	3–1	0–0	1–0	2–0	0–0	0–0	3–2	3–0		2–1	1–0	1–0	1–1
Polykastro	1–0	1–0	0–0	0–0	3–0	2–1	1–2	0–1	2–2	1–2	1–0	1–0	1–1		0–2	2–0	1–1
Preveza	0–1	1–0	1–0	0–0	3–0	3–0	2–1	0–0	0–1	1–0	1–1	1–2	1–1	3–0		2–1	1–2
Prosotsani	1–1	1–1	2–2	2–1	3–0	0–0	1–1	1–2	0–3	1–1	1–0	0–0	1–3	0–3	1–0		0–0
Thermaikos	2–0	3–1	1–0	0–0	3–0	3–0	2–0	1–0	0–0	1–0	1–1	0–0	2–2	2–1	2–1	1–0	

Legend: Blue = home team win; Yellow = draw; Red = away team win.

== Play-off match ==
14 June 2008
18:00 EEST

Ilioupoli	0–2	Anagennisi Karditsa
	Report	Boudouris 38' (pen.), 78'

Georgios Kamaras Stadium, Rizoupoli
Attendance: 5,000
Referee: Dimitris Kalopoulos (Thessaloniki)

== Top scorers ==
Rank	Name	Club	Goals
1	(Greece) Fotis Papadopoulos	Thermaikos	17
1	(Greece) Sokratis Boudouris	Anagennisi Karditsa	17
3	(Greece) Giorgos Zacharopoulos	Fostiras	16
3	(Greece) Stathis Karamalikis	Ilioupoli	16
3	(Cameroon) Eddy Oum	Diagoras	16
6	(Greece) Tassos Triantafyllou	Diagoras	14
7	(Greece) Antonis Macheroudis	Anagennisi Giannitsa	13
7	(Greece) Christos Chatzipantelidis	Niki Volos	13
7	(Greece) Nikos Aposkitis	Neos Asteras Rethymno	13
10	(Greece) Fanis Labrogeorgos	Kavala	11
