= Chaly Jones =

Dutch footballer (born 1977)

Personal information
- Full name: Shalimar Elvin Valerio Jones
- Date of birth: January 29, 1977 (age 49)
- Place of birth: Willemstad, Curaçao, Netherlands Antilles
- Height: 1.73 m (5 ft 8 in)
- Position: Midfielder

Team information
- Current team: FC Oss

Senior career*
Years	Team	Apps	(Gls)
1995–1996	Excelsior	11	(1)
1996–1997	Feyenoord	1	(0)
1997–1999	Excelsior	31	(8)
1999–2000	Den Bosch	23	(2)
2000–2002	União Madeira	46	(2)
2002–2003	TOP Oss	23	(1)
2003–2004	Fortuna Sittard	8	(0)
2004	Tollnes	3	(1)
2004–2005	Alexandroupoli Enosi	27	(13)
2005–2006	Skoda Xanthi	0	(0)
2006–2007	Thiva	22	(7)
2007–2008	Preveza	28	(4)
2008–2009	Alexandroupoli Enosi	6	(0)
2010–	FC Oss	9	(1)

International career
2004	Netherlands Antilles	3	(0)
- * Club domestic league appearances and goals as of 2 April 2011

Shalimar "Chaly" Elvin Valerio Jones (born 29 January 1977 in Willemstad, Curaçao in the former Netherlands Antilles) is a footballer who currently plays for FC Oss in the Dutch third division.

== Career ==
A much travelled midfielder, Jones played in the Netherlands, Norway, Portugal and Greece.

== International career ==
Jones made his debut for the Netherlands Antilles in a March 2004 World Cup qualifying match against Antigua & Barbuda.
