= Dimitrios Komesidis =

Greek footballer

Personal information
- Full name: Dimitrios Komesidis
- Date of birth: 2 February 1988 (age 38)
- Place of birth: Alexandroupoli, Greece
- Height: 1.83 m (6 ft 0 in)
- Positions: Centre back; right back

Team information
- Current team: Enosi Alexandroupoli

Youth career
- –2005: Skoda Xanthi

Senior career*
Years	Team	Apps	(Gls)
2005–2015	Skoda Xanthi	70	(0)
2007–2008	→ Enosi Thraki (loan)	26	(0)
2008–2009	→ Panetolikos (loan)	29	(0)
2015–2016	AEL	27	(0)
2016–2019	OFI	64	(2)
2019–	Enosi Alexandroupoli		
- * Club domestic league appearances and goals as of 28 May 2019

Dimitrios Komesidis (Greek: Δημήτριος Κομεσίδης; born 2 February 1988) is a Greek professional footballer who plays as a defender for Enosi Alexandroupoli.

He has previously played for Skoda Xanthi in the Greek Super League and for Enosi Thraki and Panetolikos in the Gamma Ethniki.
