= Kostas Giannoulis =

Greek footballer

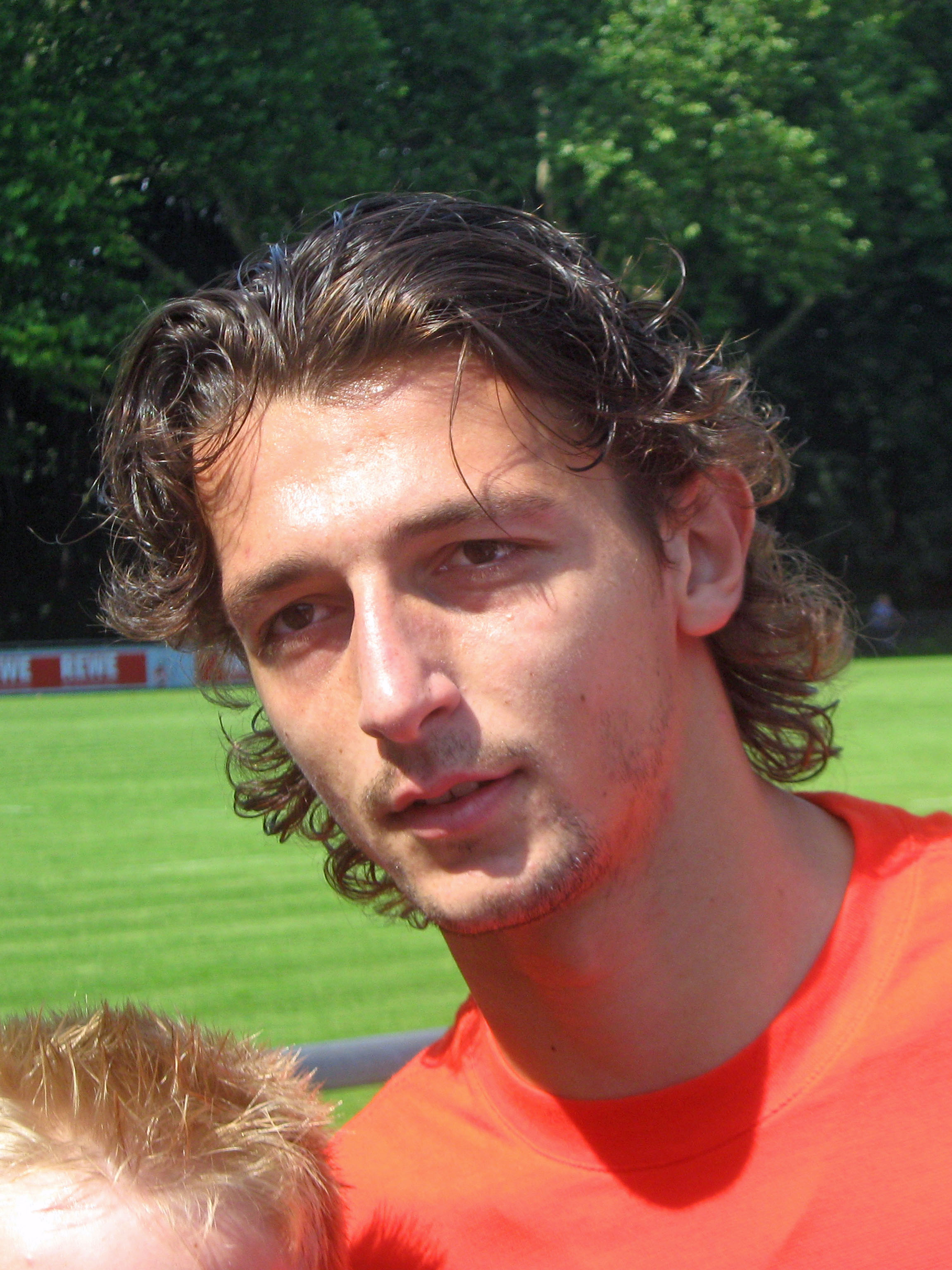

Personal information
- Full name: Konstantinos Nikolaos Giannoulis
- Date of birth: 9 December 1987 (age 38)
- Place of birth: Katerini, Greece
- Height: 1.83 m (6 ft 0 in)
- Position: Defender

Youth career
- 2000–2005: Vataniakos

Senior career*
Years	Team	Apps	(Gls)
2005–2007	Panionios	0	(0)
2006	→ Fostiras (loan)	6	(0)
2006–2007	→ Pierikos (loan)	25	(0)
2007–2010	Iraklis	55	(0)
2010–2011	1. FC Köln	0	(0)
2011–2014	Atromitos	99	(2)
2014–2015	Olympiacos	7	(0)
2015–2018	Asteras Tripolis	64	(0)
2018	Pafos	1	(0)
2018–2024	OFI	103	(0)

International career^{‡}
2011	Greece	1	(0)
- * Club domestic league appearances and goals as of 11 May 2024 ‡ National team caps and goals as of 13 May 2023

Kostas Giannoulis (Greek: Κώστας Γιαννούλης; born 9 December 1987) is a Greek former professional footballer who played as a defender.

== Club career ==
=== Panionios ===
He started his professional career in 2005 with Panionios, but he failed to make a single appearance for the club, and he was loaned to Fostiras and Pierikos. He made 25 appearances for Pierikos in their successful Gamma Ethniki campaign, where they won the title and promotion to Beta Ethniki.

=== Iraklis ===
In summer 2007, he signed for Iraklis, where he was established as a starting left-back by his then-coach, Ángel Pedraza. He made a total of 55 appearances in the Super League Greece for the team.

=== Köln ===
In May 2010, he signed for Bundesliga side 1. FC Köln. Köln have been quick to indicate their contentment with this deal. "We are very glad to have signed Konstantinos Giannoulis, who will be a gain for the defence," said general manager Michael Meier to the club's official website. "He fits exactly our left back requirements for the coming season." Kicker reports that because of Iraklis ongoing financial difficulties, Köln have been able to swoop for the defender by tabling a "low six-figure fee". They were not the only German outfit interested in the full-back, as Kaiserslautern had already made concrete steps towards securing Giannoulis' signature. After half a season however, having never played for the first team, he was told that he could leave the club for free.

=== Atromitos ===
On 23 June 2011, Giannoulis agreed to sign a season-long loan deal with Greek Super League side Atromitos, where he made 25 appearances and scored 1 goal. On 7 August 2012, he was officially released by 1. FC Köln and subsequently signed a three-year contract with Atromitos. On 21 April 2013 he scored the winning goal against AEK FC which resulted into AEK FC being relegated.

Giannoulis made his international debut for Greece on 15 November 2011, in a friendly match against Romania.

On 28 June 2014, the 27-year-old defender signed an extension of his contract (which ended at 2015) for another two years in presence of the Technical Director Giannis Aggelopoulos. He is the seventh football player that in a period less of a year that renews his contract with the team after Tasos Karamanos, Luigi Cennamo, Nikolaos Lazaridis, Efstathios Tavlaridis, Luiz Eduardo Santana Brito and Miguel Sebastián Garcia. Giannoulis had in the last season (2013/14) 44 appearances in all the organizations.

=== Olympiacos ===
On 31 August 2014, it was announced that Giannoulis has joined Olympiacos. Giannoulis commented the following at atromitosfc.gr : "A great thank is nothing in front what I owe to Atromitos. After a bad year in Germany, Atromitos brought me in Greece and gave me the chance to participate in a high level and to show the talents that I have by playing at least only once in the National Team and now to achieve a transfer at the top club of the country."

On 9 July 2015, he terminated his contract with the club.

=== Asteras Tripolis ===
On 15 July 2015, it was announced that Giannoulis had joined Asteras Tripolis on a two-year contract for an undisclosed fee.

=== Pafos ===
On 13 August 2018, Giannoulis signed a two years contract with Cypriot club Pafos FC for an undisclosed fee. On 5 September 2018, after his first game with the club he solved his contract for personal reasons.

=== OFI ===
On 28 December 2018, it was announced that Giannoulis had joined OFI on a 2 1/2-year contract for an undisclosed fee.

== Retirement ==
Giannoulis announced his retirement from football on his social media on 16 April 2024.

== Personal life ==
Giannoulis' younger brother, Dimitrios, is a professional footballer.

== Club statistics ==
Updated 31 May 2021

Appearances and goals by club, season and competition
Club	Season	League			National Cup		Europe		Total	
Club	Season	Division	Apps	Goals	Apps	Goals	Apps	Goals	Apps	Goals
Panionios	2005–06	Alpha Ethniki	0	0	0	0	–		0	0
Fostiras	2005–06	Delta Ethniki	6	0	0	0	–		6	0
Pierikos	2006–07	Gamma Ethniki	25	0	0	0	–		25	0
Iraklis	2007–08	Super League Greece	12	0	2	0	–		14	0
Iraklis	2008–09	Super League Greece	21	0	1	0	–		22	0
Iraklis	2009–10	Super League Greece	22	0	0	0	–		22	0
1. FC Köln	2010–11	Bundesliga	0	0	0	0	–		0	0
Atromitos	2011–12	Super League Greece	27	1	3	0	0	0	28	1
Atromitos	2012–13	Super League Greece	32	1	2	0	2	0	36	1
Atromitos	2013–14	Super League Greece	38	0	4	0	2	0	44	0
Atromitos	2014–15	Super League Greece	2	0	0	0	2	0	4	0
Atromitos	Total		99	2	10	0	6	0	115	2
Olympiacos	2014–15	Super League Greece	7	0	5	0	2	0	14	0
Asteras Tripolis	2015–16	Super League Greece	19	0	5	1	4	0	28	1
Asteras Tripolis	2016–17	Super League Greece	27	0	4	0	–		30	0
Asteras Tripolis	2017–18	Super League Greece	18	0	1	0	–		19	0
Asteras Tripolis	Total		64	0	10	1	4	0	78	1
Pafos	2018–19	Cypriot First Division	1	0	0	0	–		1	0
OFI	2018–19	Super League Greece	13	0	2 (Note: Appearances in the Super League Greece playoffs.)	0	–		15	0
OFI	2019–20	Super League Greece	34	0	1	0	–		35	0
OFI	2020–21	Super League Greece	20	0	2	0	1	0	22	0
OFI	Total		67	0	5	0	1	0	72	0
Career total			311	2	32	1	13	0	356	3

== Honours ==
Pierikos

- Gamma Ethniki: 2006–07

Olympiacos

- Super League Greece: 2014–15
- Greek Cup: 2014–15
