= Fabian Pawela =

Polish footballer

Personal information
- Date of birth: 30 November 1985 (age 40)
- Place of birth: Świdnica, Poland
- Height: 1.85 m (6 ft 1 in)
- Position: Striker

Senior career*
Years	Team	Apps	(Gls)
2002–2004	Polonia Świdnica		
2004–2005	Chalkidona	0	(0)
2005–2006	Acharnaikos	9	(0)
2006–2008	Thyella Patras	30	(7)
2008–2009	Panetolikos	22	(1)
2009–2010	Panegialios		
2011–2012	Czarni Żagań	39	(17)
2012–2014	Podbeskidzie Bielsko-Biała	54	(11)
2014	Podbeskidzie II	1	(0)
2014–2015	Energie Cottbus	18	(0)
2015	Energie Cottbus II	4	(0)
2015–2016	Olimpia Grudziądz	13	(1)
2016–2017	Polonia Warsaw	19	(3)
- * Club domestic league appearances and goals

Fabian Pawela (born 30 November 1985) is a Polish former professional footballer who played as a striker.
