= Giannis Katsaros =

Greek footballer (born in 1978)

Personal information
- Full name: Ioannis Katsaros
- Date of birth: 6 July 1978 (age 48)
- Place of birth: Athens, Greece
- Height: 1.78 m (5 ft 10 in)
- Position: Winger

Senior career*
Years	Team	Apps	(Gls)
1995–1996	Pierikos		
1996–1998	Agrotikos Asteras		
1998–2000	Apollon Krya Vrysi		
2000–2002	Panionios		
2002–2003	PAS Giannina		
2003–2004	Ilisiakos		
2004–2005	Enosi Thraki		
2005	Kalamata		
2006–2007	Panetolikos		
2007	Olympiacos Volos		
2008	Diagoras		
2008–2009	Makedonikos		
2009–2011	Kallithea		
2011–2012	Apollon Smyrnis		
2012–2013	Paniliakos		
- * Club domestic league appearances and goals

Giannis Katsaros (Greek: Γιάννης Κατσαρός; born 6 July 1978) is a Greek former professional footballer.
