= Rogerinho (footballer, born 1979) =

Brazilian and Italian footballer

Personal information
- Full name: Rogerio Cannellini
- Date of birth: 7 March 1979 (age 47)
- Place of birth: Campinas, São Paulo, Brazil
- Height: 1.75 m (5 ft 9 in)
- Position: Midfielder

Senior career*
Years	Team	Apps	(Gls)
1999–2001	Lokeren	15	(3)
2001–2002	Club América	11	(2)
2002	Sampaio Corrêa	5	(0)
2002–2005	Mallorca B	4	(0)
2003–2004	→ Tenerife	3	(0)
2005–2008	Skoda Xanthi	6	(0)
2005–2006	→ PAE Thraki	16	(5)
2006–2007	→ Kastoria	20	(6)
2007–2008	→ Eordaikos	5	(0)
2008–2009	A.E Irakleiou		
2009–2010	Zakynthos		
2012–2013	Kymi		
- * Club domestic league appearances and goals as of August 21, 2009

Rogerio Cannellini also known as Rogerinho (born 7 March 1979) is a both Brazilian and Italian footballer playing as an attacking midfielder.

== Career ==
Rogerinho previously played in the Copa do Brasil for Sampaio Corrêa Futebol Clube. He signed with RCD Mallorca, but only made appearances with the club's reserve team. In December 2003, Mallorca loaned Rogerinho to CD Tenerife where he would make three Segunda División appearances.

Rogerinho joined Skoda Xanthi in 2005. He was loaned to Alexandroupoli Enosi and Kastoria F.C. during his time with Skoda Xanthi.
