= 2009–10 Beta Ethniki =

Beta Ethniki
- Season: 2009–10
- Dates: 11 September 2009 – 16 May 2010
- Champions: Olympiacos Volos
- Promoted: Olympiacos Volos; Kerkyra; Panserraikos
- Relegated: Rodos; Kalamata; Egaleo

2009–10 was a season of Beta Ethniki (Greek: Β' Εθνική), the Greek professional football second division (see Greek football league system).

== Overview ==
- Atromitos, PAS Giannina and Kavala have earned the promotion to Super League Greece, while Kastoria, Kallithea and Veria relegated to Gamma Ethniki (see 2008–09 Beta Ethniki).
- Thrasyvoulos, Panserraikos and OFI will compete in Beta Ethniki this season after being relegated from the Super League in 2008–09.
- Doxa Drama and Ilioupoli will compete in Beta Ethniki this season after earning promotion from Gamma Ethniki in 2008–09. Ilisiakos merged with Egaleo, which was relegated to Delta Ethniki in 2008–2009 season and renamed as Egaleo in August 2009.
- Panetolikos earned promotion from Gamma Ethniki by beating Rodos in Gamma Ethniki promotion play-offs.
- Rodos earned promotion from Gamma Ethniki by qualifying for the Gamma Ethniki play-offs and replacing the suspended Apollon Kalamarias.

== League table ==
Location of teams in 2009–10 Beta Ethniki

Pos	Team	Pld	W	D	L	GF	GA	GD	Pts	Promotion or relegation
1	Olympiacos Volos (C, P)	34	21	5	8	73	36	+37	68	Promotion to Super League
2	Kerkyra (P)	34	18	9	7	45	25	+20	63	Promotion to Super League
3	OFI	34	18	8	8	44	35	+9	62	Qualification for Promotion play-offs
4	Ethnikos Piraeus	34	14	11	9	43	30	+13	53	Qualification for Promotion play-offs
5	Panserraikos (P)	34	14	10	10	36	35	+1	52	Qualification for Promotion play-offs
6	Pierikos	34	12	14	8	41	31	+10	50	Qualification for Promotion play-offs
7	Panetolikos	34	13	11	10	43	36	+7	50	
8	Diagoras Rodos	34	14	6	14	43	42	+1	48	
9	Ilioupoli	34	12	10	12	33	35	−2	46	
10	Agrotikos Asteras	34	10	15	9	36	31	+5	45	
11	Ethnikos Asteras	34	12	9	13	39	37	+2	45	
12	Anagennisi Karditsa	34	10	14	10	29	28	+1	44	
13	Thrasyvoulos	34	9	14	11	42	42	0	41	Qualification for Relegation play-offs
14	Doxa Drama	34	10	10	14	37	49	−12	40	Qualification for Relegation play-offs
15	Ionikos	34	10	9	15	32	45	−13	39	Qualification for Relegation play-offs
16	Rodos (R)	34	9	7	18	31	46	−15	34	Qualification for Relegation play-offs
17	Kalamata (R)	34	6	10	18	21	49	−28	28	Relegation to Football League 2
18	Egaleo (R)	34	5	6	23	19	55	−36	21	Relegation to Delta Ethniki (Note: After Egaleo got relegated to the Delta Ethniki in the 2008–09 Gamma Ethniki season, Egaleo merged with Ilisiakos and renamed to Egaleo A.O. However, at the end of the 2009–10 season, this merger was determined illegal by the Greek Council of State, hence the merger was cancelled and Egaleo were relegated to Delta Ethniki.)

Source: Soccerway,
Rules for classification: 1) points; 2) head-to-head points; 3) head-to-head goal difference; 4) head-to-head goals scored; 5) goal difference; 6) number of goals scored.
(C) Champions; (P) Promoted; (R) Relegated

== Results ==
Home \ Away	AGR	KRD	DIA	DDR	EGA	ETA	ETH	ILI	ION	KAL	KER	OFI	OLV	PNT	PSE	PIE	ROD	THR
Agrotikos Asteras		0–2	1–0	0–2	1–0	0–0	2–1	3–0	3–1	2–2	0–0	2–0	3–0	1–2	1–1	0–0	2–0	0–0
Anagennisi Karditsa	1–1		0–0	1–1	2–0	3–0	0–0	1–0	2–1	2–0	1–0	1–1	1–1	3–1	0–1	1–1	0–0	0–0
Diagoras Rodos	0–0	1–0		2–2	3–2	3–1	0–2	1–2	4–1	2–0	1–2	2–1	2–1	2–1	0–1	1–2	1–2	2–1
Doxa Drama	0–1	0–0	2–2		2–0	2–2	2–1	1–1	2–1	3–1	1–2	1–2	1–2	0–1	1–1	2–1	2–1	4–3
Egaleo	0–2	2–0	1–2	0–0		1–1	1–1	0–1	0–2	2–1	2–2	0–1	0–3 (Note: Match awarded.)	0–1	0–1	0–1	2–1	0–2
Ethnikos Asteras	0–0	2–0	1–0	1–0	3–0		1–1	0–1	1–1	1–0	1–1	1–2	0–0	3–2	1–2	1–2	2–0	1–0
Ethnikos Piraeus	2–2	2–3	1–1	4–0	1–0	1–2		2–1	0–1	1–0	1–0	3–0	2–1	0–0	1–1	1–1	2–0	2–0
Ilioupoli	2–1	1–0	2–1	1–1	1–0	0–2	0–2		1–1	3–1	1–0	3–0	1–3	2–0	0–0	1–1	2–0	2–2
Ionikos	0–0	0–0	0–1	1–0	2–1	1–0	0–1	1–1		3–1	0–0	1–1	2–3	1–1	2–1	1–1	1–0	2–1
Kalamata	1–1	1–0	1–0	2–0	1–1	1–3	0–0	0–0	1–0		0–1	1–1	0–2	2–1	0–3	2–1	0–0	0–2
Kerkyra	3–2	4–2	3–2	1–0	0–1	1–0	3–1	1–0	1–0	3–0		3–0	0–0	0–0	4–0	0–0	1–0	1–0
OFI	1–0	0–0	0–1	3–1	2–0	2–1	0–2	1–0	3–0	3–0	3–1		1–1	1–1	2–2	1–0	3–0	2–1
Olympiacos Volos	4–1	0–1	2–0	4–0	6–0	0–1	2–0	3–2	2–1	3–0	1–3	3–0		3–1	2–0	2–1	5–2	5–1
Panetolikos	1–1	1–0	2–1	1–2	1–0	2–1	2–2	4–1	3–0	0–0	1–1	1–1	2–2		2–0	1–1	1–0	3–0
Panserraikos	1–0	1–1	1–2	1–1	0–1	2–1	0–1	1–0	2–1	1–0	1–0	1–2	2–1	0–2		1–1	2–0	2–2
Pierikos	0–0	1–1	2–0	2–0	4–1	2–1	1–0	0–0	3–0	1–1	1–2	1–2	2–3	2–0	1–0		1–0	2–4
Rodos	2–2	1–0	0–2	0–1	3–0	2–1	1–1	2–0	1–2	2–0	2–1	0–1	3–2	1–0	2–3	1–1		1–1
Thrasyvoulos	2–1	3–0	2–2	3–0	1–1	2–2	2–1	0–0	3–1	1–1	0–0	0–1	0–1	2–1	0–0	0–0	1–1	

Source: Soccerway
Legend: Blue = home team win; Yellow = draw; Red = away team win.

== Play-offs ==
Starting from this season, a play-off group will be held between the teams which finished in positions 3-6 for the last promotion spot, and a play-out group between the teams which finished in positions 13-16 for the last relegation spot.

The same system which is used to the European play-off of First Division (see Super League Greece) will be applied. The play-off and play-out of Second Division (Football League). Teams play each other in a home and away round robin. However, they do not all start with 0 points. Instead, a weighting system applies to the teams' standing at the start of the play-off mini-league. The team finishing sixth in the Football League will start the play-off with 0 points. The sixth placed team's end of season tally of points is subtracted from the sum of the points that other teams have. The only difference with European play-off of Super League is that this number is then divided by four (instead to five in Super League), to give the other teams the points with which they start the mini-league. If necessary, points will be rounded.

As a result, the teams will start the promotional play-offs with the following number of points:

- OFI – 3 points ((62–50) / 4 )
- Ethikos Peiraeus – 1 point ((53–50) / 4 = 0.75, rounded to 1)
- Panserraikos– 1 point ((52–50) / 4 = 0.5, rounded to 1)
- Pierikos – 0 points ((50–50) / 4 = 0)

Also, the teams will start the relegation play-offs with the following number of points:

- Thrasyvoulos - 2 points ((41-34) / 4 = 1.75, rounded to 2)
- Doxa Dramas - 2 points ((40-34) / 4 = 1.5, rounded to 2)
- Ionikos - 1 point ((39-34) / 4=1.25, rounded to 1)
- Rodos - 0 points ((34–34) / 4 = 0)

=== Promotion play-offs ===
Pos	Team	Pld	W	D	L	GF	GA	GD	Pts	Promotion	PSE	OFI	ETH	PIE
1	Panserraikos (P)	6	4	1	1	9	3	+6	14	Promotion to Super League		1–1	1–0	2–0
2	OFI	6	2	3	1	9	8	+1	12		0–1		2–1	2–1
3	Ethnikos Piraeus	6	2	2	2	11	11	0	9		1–0	4–4		2–1
4	Pierikos	6	0	2	4	6	13	−7	2		1–4	0–0	3–3	

Source: Soccerway
Legend: Blue = home team win; Yellow = draw; Red = away team win.
Rules for classification: 1) points; 2) goal difference; 3) number of goals scored.
(P) Promoted

=== Relegation play-offs ===
Pos	Team	Pld	W	D	L	GF	GA	GD	Pts	Relegation	DDR	THR	ION	ROD
1	Doxa Drama	6	2	3	1	8	5	+3	11			2–0	2–0	1–1
2	Thrasyvoulos	6	2	2	2	8	9	−1	10		1–1		3–1	3–2
3	Ionikos	6	2	2	2	7	8	−1	9		2–1	2–0		1–1
4	Rodos (R)	6	0	5	1	7	8	−1	5	Relegation to Football League 2	1–1	1–1	1–1	

Source: Soccerway
Legend: Blue = home team win; Yellow = draw; Red = away team win.
Rules for classification: 1) points; 2) goal difference; 3) number of goals scored.
(R) Relegated

== Top scorers ==
Rank	Player	Club	Goals
1	(Greece) Ilias Solakis	Olympiacos Volos	20
2	(Brazil) Rogério	Olympiacos Volos	18
3	(Greece) Efstathios Karamalikis	Thrasyvoulos	16
4	(Greece) Giorgos Theodoridis	Panetolikos	14
5	(Serbia) Marko Markovski	Doxa Drama	13
6	(Cape Verde) José Emilio Furtado	Ionikos	12
6	(Brazil) Rodrigo	Ethnikos Piraeus	12
8	(Greece) Anestis Agritis	OFI	10
8	(France) Marc-Eric Guei	Ethnikos Asteras	10
8	(Brazil) Leozinho	Panserraikos	10
