= 2007–08 Beta Ethniki =

Beta Ethniki
- Season: 2007–08
- Dates: 22 September 2007 – 2 June 2008
- Champions: Panserraikos
- Promoted: Panserraikos; Thrasyvoulos; Panthrakikos
- Relegated: Egaleo; Haidari; Agios Dimitrios
- Top goalscorer: Ilias Anastasakos (18 goals)

Beta Ethniki 2007–08 complete season.

== League table ==
Location of teams in 2007–08 Beta Ethniki

Pos	Team	Pld	W	D	L	GF	GA	GD	Pts	Promotion or relegation
1	Panserraikos (C, P)	34	18	10	6	46	19	+27	64	Promotion to Super League
2	Thrasyvoulos (P)	34	18	7	9	44	27	+17	61	Promotion to Super League
3	Panthrakikos (Note: Panthrakikos had one game with Haidari zeroed and 1 point deducted.) (P)	34	17	10	7	44	31	+13	60	Promotion to Super League
4	PAS Giannina	34	16	9	9	54	38	+16	57	
5	Ionikos	34	15	9	10	37	28	+9	54	
6	Kallithea	34	15	7	12	40	35	+5	52	
7	Kerkyra	34	13	11	10	39	33	+6	50	
8	Agrotikos Asteras	34	14	5	15	44	46	−2	47	
9	Ethnikos Piraeus	34	11	12	11	32	36	−4	45	
10	Ilisiakos	34	13	4	17	31	38	−7	43	
11	Kalamata	34	11	9	14	30	33	−3	42	
12	Ethnikos Asteras	34	10	11	13	32	37	−5	41	
13	Pierikos (Note: Pierikos had 3 points deducted.)	34	10	14	10	28	31	−3	41	
14	Olympiacos Volos	34	9	12	13	31	38	−7	39	
15	Kastoria	34	10	9	15	26	41	−15	39	
16	Egaleo (R)	34	10	9	15	28	34	−6	39	Relegation to Gamma Ethniki
17	Haidari (R)	34	8	14	12	30	31	−1	38	Relegation to Gamma Ethniki
18	Agios Dimitrios (R)	34	2	8	24	22	62	−40	14	Relegation to Gamma Ethniki

(C) Champions; (P) Promoted; (R) Relegated

== Results ==
Home \ Away	AGD	AGR	EGA	ETA	ETH	HAI	ILS	ION	KAL	KLT	KAS	KER	OLV	PSE	PTH	PAS	PIE	THR
Agios Dimitrios		1–2	0–2	0–2	1–1	1–2	1–1	0–1	1–0	0–2	0–1	1–3	1–2	0–2	1–3	1–1	1–1	0–1
Agrotikos Asteras	1–0		3–0	1–2	2–1	1–1	1–0	4–3	1–0	0–0	3–1	3–0	2–2	0–1	1–2	4–3	1–1	0–0
Egaleo	1–0	2–0		2–0	1–1	2–1	3–2	1–2	1–0	1–2	0–0	0–0	0–1	0–0	1–2	1–2	1–0	0–0
Ethnikos Asteras	4–4	2–1	1–0		1–1	1–1	1–2	1–0	2–0	0–2	1–0	2–3	0–0	1–1	0–1	0–0	1–0	1–1
Ethnikos Piraeus	1–2	1–0	1–2	1–0		1–1	1–2	1–1	0–0	2–1	1–0	1–0	1–0	0–0	3–2	2–2	0–0	2–1
Haidari	0–0	0–2	0–2	2–0	1–0		0–0	2–3	1–0	0–0	4–1	0–0	1–1	0–1	0–0	2–0	0–0	2–1
Ilisiakos	2–0	0–1	1–0	1–0	0–0	1–0		1–0	2–1	0–1	1–0	0–2	2–0	2–3	0–1	0–3	2–3	1–2
Ionikos	3–0	3–1	2–1	1–0	2–1	1–0	1–0		1–1	0–1	0–0	1–2	1–0	1–0	0–0	4–1	0–1	0–0
Kalamata	6–1	2–0	2–0	0–0	0–1	0–0	1–0	2–1		1–0	0–0	2–1	1–0	1–0	2–0	0–0	0–1	2–1
Kallithea	4–1	4–3	1–1	3–1	0–0	2–2	1–0	0–1	1–3		1–0	0–1	0–0	1–0	1–3	2–0	1–0	1–0
Kastoria	1–0	2–1	1–0	0–1	1–2	1–0	1–0	1–1	2–1	0–1		3–0	1–1	0–1	2–2	1–1	2–1	0–1
Kerkyra	2–0	1–2	1–1	2–1	1–1	2–1	1–2	0–0	2–0	2–1	4–0		2–2	0–0	0–0	1–1	0–0	1–0
Olympiacos Volos	0–0	0–1	1–1	0–3	3–1	1–1	2–1	0–1	2–0	3–2	2–2	0–2		1–1	0–0	2–0	1–0	2–0
Panserraikos	1–1	2–1	2–0	0–0	2–0	2–2	2–0	1–0	3–0	1–0	3–0	1–0	2–1		1–1	1–1	5–0	3–0
Panthrakikos	2–0	2–0	1–0	3–3	2–1	0–3 (Note: 3–2 original score)	2–0	1–1	3–0	2–1	0–0	2–1	2–1	3–1		0–2	0–0	1–3
PAS Giannina	2–0	4–1	2–0	3–0	2–0	1–0	2–0	1–0	1–1	2–1	1–2	3–1	4–0	1–3	1–0		3–3	2–1
Pierikos	2–1	1–0	0–0	0–0	1–2	1–0	1–1	1–1	1–1	1–0	3–0	1–0	1–1	0–1	0–1	2–1		0–0
Thrasyvoulos	3–2	3–0	2–1	1–0	2–0	2–0	0–1	2–0	0–0	4–1	3–0	1–1	1–0	2–1	1–0	2–1	3–1	

Legend: Blue = home team win; Yellow = draw; Red = away team win.

== Top scorers ==
Rank	Player	Club	Goals
1	(Greece) Ilias Anastasakos	Thrasyvoulos	18
2	(Greece) Vangelis Kaounos	Kalamata	15
3	(Nigeria) Benjamin Onwuachi	Ionikos	14
4	(Greece) Georgios Gougoulias	Panserraikos	13
5	(Greece) Georgios Saitiotis	PAS Giannina	12
5	(Greece) Ilias Solakis	PAS Giannina	12
5	(Greece) Ilias Kampas	Ilisiakos	12
5	(Greece) Alexandros Kaklamanos	Kerkyra	12
9	(Greece) Nikolaos Soultanidis	Agrotikos Asteras	11
9	(Greece) Vangelis Kontogoulidis	PAS Giannina	11
