= Panagiotis Chronis =

Greek footballer (born 1984)

Personal information
- Date of birth: 18 July 1984 (age 42)
- Place of birth: Mytilene, Greece
- Height: 1.75 m (5 ft 9 in)
- Position: Midfielder

Senior career*
Years	Team	Apps	(Gls)
2002–2003	Ethnikos Asteras	0	(0)
2007–2008	Aiolikos	27	(2)
2018–19	Achilleas Petras	0	(0)
- * Club domestic league appearances and goals

Panagiotis Chronis (Greek: Παναγιώτης Χρόνης; born 18 July 1984) is a Greek football player.

Chronis was previously on the books of Ethnikos Asteras F.C. during the 2002–03 Beta Ethniki season.
