= Patryk Aleksandrowicz =

Polish professional football player

Personal information
- Date of birth: 5 June 1983 (age 43)
- Place of birth: Zgorzelec, Poland
- Height: 1.80 m (5 ft 11 in)
- Position: Midfielder

Youth career
- Piast Zawidów
- –2003: Polonia Warsaw

Senior career*
Years	Team	Apps	(Gls)
2003–2004	Polonia Warsaw	3	(0)
2004–2005	Znicz Pruszków		
2005	Marko	15	(4)
2005–2008	AE Giannena	87	(26)
2008–2011	Kavala	27	(3)
2009–2010	→ Thrasyvoulos (loan)	14	(3)
2011	Doxa Drama	8	(1)
2011–2012	Wigry Suwałki	5	(0)
2012	Iraklis Psachna	20	(2)
2012–2013	Ethnikos Gazoros	13	(3)
2013	AEL	15	(5)
2013–2014	Panegialios	10	(0)
2014	Agrotikos Asteras		
2016–2019	Elana Toruń	78	(22)
2019	Sparta Brodnica	5	(3)
2020–2021	Weszło Warsaw	4	(0)
2021	Unia Janikowo II	2	(1)
- * Club domestic league appearances and goals

Patryk Aleksandrowicz (born 5 June 1983) is a Polish former professional footballer who played as a midfielder.

He previously played in Greece, and for Polonia.

Aleksandrowicz was an important member of Kavala F.C.'s 2008–09 Beta Ethniki campaign, but after the club gained promotion, he was loaned to Thrasyvoulos F.C., a club that was relegated from the Super League. Aleksandrowicz would make a few Super League appearances for Kavala when he returned for the 2010–11 season, and then had brief spells in the Beta Ethniki with Doxa Drama F.C., Iraklis Psachna F.C., Ethnikos Gazoros F.C. and Athlitiki Enosi Larissa F.C.

== Honours ==
Elana Toruń

- III liga, group II: 2017–18

KTS Weszło

- Klasa A Warsaw I: 2020–21
