= Demba Traoré =

Swedish footballer

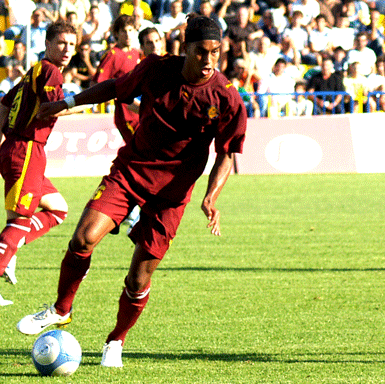

Personal information
- Full name: Demba Souleymane Traoré
- Date of birth: 22 April 1982
- Place of birth: Stockholm, Sweden
- Height: 6 ft 2 in (1.88 m)
- Positions: Centre-back; striker

Team information
- Current team: Lyn
- Number: 10

Youth career
- AIK
- Vasalund
- Cambridge United

Senior career*
Years	Team	Apps	(Gls)
2000–2003	Cambridge United	12	(0)
2003–2004	Enfield	37	(15)
2004–2005	Vasalund/Essinge IF	21	(13)
2005–2007	Panetolikos	52	(19)
2007–2008	Apollon Kalamarias		
2009–2010	Fortuna Sittard	28	(10)
2011–2013	Nybergsund IL-Trysil	69	(21)
2014–2018	Asker	105	(25)
2019–	Lyn	1	(0)
- * Club domestic league appearances and goals as of 14 April 2019

Demba Souleymane Traoré (born 22 April 1982) is a Swedish football striker/midfielder who plays for Lyn.

== Career ==
Traoré was born in Stockholm with a father from Mali and a mother from Finland.

Troaré made his first team debut at the age of 18 with Cambridge United against Bristol City in the 2000–01 Football League Second Division. The next season Traoré made his first start for the club, in the league opener at the Abbey Stadium against Brighton & Hove Albion. Traoré was chosen as Man of the Match.

In 2004 Traoré returned to the Swedish club Vasalund/Essinge IF. While playing for Vasalund/Essing IF in Division 2 Östra Svealand, Traoré finished as the league's top scorer with 13 goals and was chosen as the league's best attacker in the 2004–2005 season.

Traoré later played for the Greek clubs Panetolikos F.C. and Apollon Kalamarias in the Beta Ethniki, Greece's second tier. Due to Apollon's economic problems, Traoré left on a free transfer with six months left on his contract and was signed by Dutch club Fortuna Sittard on 7 August 2009. He made his debut the same day when his new club lost 4–0 against Helmond Sport. Traoré scored his first hat-trick in his third game for Fortuna Sittard, when HFC Haarlem was beaten 5–1 on 21 August.

In the end of March 2011, Traoré signed a one-year contract with Nybergsund IL-Trysil in Norway. Traoré scored his first goal for the club in an away game against Mjøndalen IF on 10 April 2011. 2012 Traoré extended his contract with the club for one more year. He ended the season scoring 10 goals playing first half of the season as a center-forward and the second half at the right-wing. 2013 Traoré signed a new contract for another year. He moved from playing as centre-forward to a center-back position for the first time in his career. He was also given the Captain's armband.

Ahead of the 2014 season he joined Asker Fotball. He left the club again at the end of 2018.

On 18 February 2019, Traoré joined Lyn Fotball, his third Norwegian club.
