= Haidari F.C. =

Association football club in Greece

AO Haidari
- Full name: Haidari Athletic Club
- Founded: 1937; 89 years ago
- Ground: Takis Charalambidis Stadium
- Capacity: 600
- Chairman: Michalis Theodosiadis
- Manager: Evangelos Stavrakopoulos
- League: Athens FCA First Division
- 2025–26: Gamma Ethniki (Group 6), 10th (relegated)
- Website: Official website
Home colours	Away colours

Haidari Football Club (Greek: Α.Ο. Χαϊδαρίου) is a Greek football club, based in Haidari, Athens. It currently plays in the local Athens Football Clubs Association championships, the fourth level of Greek football.

== History ==
Founded in 1937, the club features the goddess Athena as its emblem. The team's original colors were yellow and black, which over the years were changed to red and blue, colors that remain to this day. In 1958, A.O. Haidari competed for the first time in the Athens Football Clubs Association championship. In the early 1980s, the first home ground of Haidari was constructed—the "Sideropoulos" stadium on Iera Odos—putting an end to the team's years-long roaming across neighboring municipalities. In 1986, the Haidari team earned promotion to Delta Ethniki for the first time, while in 1990 it was promoted to Gamma Ethniki for the first time.

In 1993, the team played for the first time at the newly built Municipal Stadium in Dasos Chaidariou. From 1996 to 2004, Haidari competed in Delta Ethniki. The year 2004, under head coach Giannis Papakostas, was a landmark season for the club, as it achieved a treble (winning the Delta Ethniki Group 8 championship, the Athens FCA Cup by defeating Sourmena 3–2 in extra time at the Kallithea Stadium, and the Greek Football Amateur Cup by defeating Aiolikos 3–0 in the final at Kiato Stadium), thereby securing promotion to Gamma Ethniki. In 2005, during its first season back in Gamma Ethniki, the club earned promotion to Beta Ethniki for the first time in its history as the runner-up of the Southern Group. It went on to compete in Beta Ethniki for three consecutive seasons (2005–06, 2006–07, and 2007–08). On 9 November 2006, Haidari achieved the greatest victory in its history by defeating AEK Athens at Stavros Mavrothalassitis Stadium in the round of 32 of the Greek Cup, winning 5–4 in a penalty shootout following a goalless draw.

From 2011 to 2023, the team competed in the First Division of the Athens Football Clubs Association, winning two championships during this period. The first was in 2014, although the club subsequently missed out on promotion to Gamma Ethniki through the play-off system. The second title came in 2023 under head coach Giannis Chloros, when the team successfully secured promotion to Gamma Ethniki, where it competed until 2026.

In 2025, under head coach Giannis Silevistas, the team won the second Athens FCA Cup in its history, defeating Apollon Smyrnis 3–2 after extra time in the final held at Peristeri Stadium.

In 2026, under head coach Vangelis Stavrakopoulos, the team won its second consecutive and third overall Athens FCA Cup in club history, defeating P.A.O. Rouf 1–0 in the final at the Apostolos Nikolaidis Stadium.

== Supporters ==
In 2003, the first attempt was made to organize Haidari's fan base. With the approval of the club's board, a supporters' club was established, which eventually ceased operations in the summer of 2004 due to exhaustion among its organizers.

In 2006, following the team's promotion to Beta Ethniki, a new effort was launched to unite supporters, initially meeting at a café opposite the stadium with approximately 80 people attending. This led to the formation of a new supporters' club, officially named West Siders.

== Honours ==
=== National ===
- Delta Ethniki: (2)
  - 1989–90, 2003–04
- Greek Football Amateur Cup: (1)
  - 2003–04

=== Regional ===
- Athens FCA First Division: (3)
  - 1985–86, 2013–14, 2022–23
- Athens FCA Cup: (3)
  - 2003–04, 2024–25, 2025–26
- Athens FCA Second Division: (1)
  - 1975–76

== Results ==
- November 9, 2006: defeated AEK (5–4) in a 32 team level of the 2006–07 Greek Football Cup at Stavros Mavrothalassitis Field.
