= Polykastro F.C. =

A.E. Polykastro
- Full name: Athletiki Enosis Polykastro
- Founded: 1951; 75 years ago
- Ground: Polykastro Stadium
- Capacity: 900
- Chairman: Panagiotis Goudenoudis
- Manager: Sokratis Fytanidis
- League: Gamma Ethniki
- 2025–26: Kilkis FCA First Division, 1st (promoted)
- Website: Official website
Home colours	Away colours

AE Polykastro (Greek: Α.Ε. Πολυκάστρου) is a football club based in Polykastro, Greece. It was founded in 1951.

Polykastro has spent 10 seasons in the Gamma Ethniki, last appearing during the 2007–08 season.

== History ==
Athlitiki Enosi Polykastro was founded following the merger of two older clubs, Olympiacos Polykastro (1951) and POA (Podosfairikos Omilos Anatolikoromylioton 1956).

== Honours ==
=== Domestic Titles and honours ===
- Delta Ethniki: 2
  - 1982–83, 2004–05
- Kilkis FCA First Division: 7
  - 1973–74, 1974–75, 1980–81, 1997–98, 1999–00, 2002–03, 2025–26
- Kilkis FCA Cup: 8
  - 1973–74, 1974–75, 1979–80, 1980–81, 1982–83, 1988–89, 2003–04, 2008–09
