= Koropi F.C. =

AO Koropi
- Full name: Athltikos Omilos Koropi
- Nickname: AOK
- Founded: 30 March 1903; 123 years ago
- Ground: Antonis Priftis Stadium
- Capacity: 1,586
- Chairman: Theodoros Koulopoulos
- Manager: Vlasis Chatzianastasiou
- League: East Attica FCA Second Division
- 2025–26: East Attica FCA Second Division, 4th
Home colours	Away colours

AO Koropi or Koropi FC (Greek: ΑΟ Κορωπί) is a football club based in Koropi, Greece. It was founded on 30 March 1903. Its logo and jerseys are blue white with its stripes in its shield-like logo. The team plays in the Antonis Priftis Stadium. The team has never won a title.

== History ==
From 1930, it brought its first game until 1940 when it won the championships in the area of Mesogeia.

From 1961, it played in the Athens premier division and for a few years made it to the Athens and the National first division. From 1969 until 1977, the team remained in the first division and were one of the greatest spaces in the junction of the team. After its large period in the local championships, Koropi FC won and returned itself into the national third division in 2006 and currently plays since. From 2004, it plays in the East Attica Football Clubs Association after its separation.

== Achievements ==
- Athens FCA Second Division (1):

1966

- East Attica FCA (1):

2004

- Delta Ethniki Group 7 (1):

2006

- East Attica Cup (1):

2011

== Season to season ==
- 1930 – 40: Mesogeia Local Championship
- 1945 – 69: Athens FCA Third, Second and Premier Divisions
- 1969 – 77: Division 2
- 1977 – 79: Division 3
- 1979 – 2003: Athens FCA
- 2003 – 04: East Attica FCA
- 2004 – 06: Division 4
- 2006 – 09: Division/Tier 2
- 2009 – 11: Tier 4

== League and cup history ==
Season	Tier 1	Tier 2	Tier 3	Tier 4	Tier 5	Tier 6	Tier 7	Tier 8	Pts.	Pl.	W	L	T	GS	GA	Diff.	Greek Cup
1968-69						1			53	22	30	17					
2004-05					1												
2005-06				1 (G7)													
