= Thiva F.C. =

Greek association football club

Thiva
- Full name: Athlitikos Omilos Thiva
- Founded: 1968; 58 years ago
- Ground: Thebes Municipal Stadium
- Capacity: 1,173
- Chairman: Georgios Tzoumanekas
- Manager: Dimitrios Papaspyrou
- League: Gamma Ethniki
- 2025–26: Boeotia FCA First Division, 1st (promoted)
- Website: https://aoithiva.blogspot.com/
Home colours	Away colours

Thiva Football Club (Greek: Α.Ο. Θήβα) is a Greek football club based in Thebes, Greece.

== History ==
It was founded in 1968 after the merger of Kadmos Thiva F.C. (named after Cadmus) and Ionikos Asteras F.C. The colours of the club are cherry and black and the logo is an ancient Theban shield.

Since then, A.O. Thiva has been the major football power in the city of Thebes, which it has represented 3 times in the Beta Ethniki, 11 times in the Gamma Ethniki, and 16 times in the Delta Ethniki. Additionally, during the 1990–91 season, the club was a finalist in the Greek Football Amateur Cup, while also boasting 10 Boeotia FCA League titles and 12 Boeotia FCA Cup titles.

== Honours ==
=== Titles and Honours ===
  - Gamma Ethniki Champions: 2
    - 1971–72, 1981–82
  - Delta Ethniki Champions: 1
    - 2005–06
  - Greek FCA Winners' Championship Champions: 2
    - 1972, 2016
  - Euboea-Boeotia FCA / Boeotia FCA Champions: 10
    - 1968–69, 1971–72 / 1976–77, 1980–81, 1988–89, 2002–03, 2014–15, 2015–16, 2023–24, 2025–26
  - Euboea–Boeotia FCA / Boeotia FCA Cup Winners: 12
    - 1971–72, 1978–79, 1979–80, 1981–82, 1989–90, 1990–91, 1991–92, 1993–94, 1995–96, 2003–04, 2014–15, 2017–18

== Participations ==
=== Football League ===
1969/70, 1972/73, 1982/83

=== Gamma Ethniki ===
1977/78, 1981/82, 1983/84, 1984/85, 1985/86, 1986/87, 2006/07, 2007/08, 2016/17, 2017/18, 2024/25, 2026/27
