= Thyella Patras F.C. =

Association football club in Greece

Thyella Patras
- Full name: Thyella Patras Football Club
- Nickname: Thyella Patras
- Founded: 14 June 1930; 96 years ago
- Ground: Fotis Aravantinos Stadium
- Chairman: Takis Thanopoulos
- Manager: Byron Karavias - Theodoros Nikolakopoulos
- League: Achaea FCA First Division
- 2025–26: Gamma Ethniki (Group 4), 10th (relegated)
- Website: https://thyellafc.gr/
Home colours	Away colours

The first version of this article has been based in the text of Θύελλα Πατρών of the Greek Wikipedia published under the GFDL.

Thyella ("Storm") (Greek: Α.Π.Σ. Θύελλα A.P.S. Thyella) is a football club based in the city of Patras, Greece. It was officially founded in 1930 and is based in the Prosfygika district of the city.

The club's official colors are blue and white. It holds registration number 97 in the Hellenic Football Federation (HFF), making it one of the first 100 officially recognized football clubs in Greece. Thyella competes under the jurisdiction of the Achaia Football Clubs Association and has a long history of participation in the national leagues, including the Second Division (Beta Ethniki), Gamma Ethniki, and Delta Ethniki.

The team's home ground is the Fotis Aravantinos Stadium, located in Patras, with a capacity of 1,985 spectators.

== History ==
The club was founded on 14 June 1930 and in the same year participated in the Third Amateur Division. The founding act was signed by Nikos Karelas and Vasilis Kotidis, with Giannis Fyteas serving as the club's first president.

By 1938, the team had reached the First Division and became a major contender, winning its first championship in 1951 and repeating the achievement in the following two years, 1952 and 1953. For many years, Thyella was the main rival of Panachaiki GE, with their matches becoming legendary and memorable in the local football scene.

In 1959, a merger was agreed with APS Olympiakos Patron, but it lasted only two years due to disagreements over the new club name. Thyella proposed "Thyellodis Olympiakos," while Olympiakos suggested "Olympiaki Thyella." During the 1959–60 season, the merged club played under the name "Olympiakos" and won the Patras championship, qualifying for the 1960 Greek football promotion play-offs for promotion to the Alpha Ethniki. In 1960–61, the club reverted to the name "Thyella Patron" and again qualified for the 1961 Greek football promotion play-offs, narrowly missing promotion to the top tier by finishing 4th behind A.O. Aigaleo, Panachaiki, and OFI, with whom they were tied at 37 points.

In 1963, Thyella became champions of Patras and earned promotion to the Second Division (Beta Ethniki), where they competed for four consecutive seasons, from 1963–64 through 1966–67.

In 1967, while still a Second Division team, Thyella was forcibly merged by law under the military junta regime and Sports Minister Konstantinos Aslanidis, along with six other clubs from Patras — APS Olympiakos, AS Iraklis Patron, APS Proodeftiki Patron, Apollon Patras, Patraikos Omilos Filathlon, and AO Achilleas Patras — to form the new club APS Patrai. Thyella opposed the merger, but authorities intervened and forcibly took the club's registry and charter. In response, club members hid the constitution, emblem, and seal in a metal box buried in a plot of land in the Eglykada area, where they remained hidden until the end of the dictatorship.

In 1969, the club was re-established based on the charter of its affiliated team "Elpis Eglykadas", and even before the fall of the junta in 1973, Thyella reclaimed its name, winning the Patras Championship and the local cup by defeating Achaiki 3–0 in the final. As champions, they participated in the 1973 Greek Amateur Football Promotion Championship, aiming for a return to the Second Division, but without success.

In the 1977–78, 1978–79, and 1981–82 seasons, the club played in the National Amateur Division, then the third tier of Greek football. From 1980 to 1983, Thyella reached four consecutive Achaia Cup finals but failed to win any of them. In the following years, the team moved between local leagues and the Fourth National Division, eventually winning the 9th Group of Delta Ethniki in the 2002–03 season and earning promotion to the professional Gamma Ethniki, where they played for five consecutive years (2003–04 to 2007–08).

In the 2008–09 season, they played in the 6th Group of Delta Ethniki but were relegated. They returned in the 2011–12 season but were again relegated to the Achaia regional league.

In 2019, Thyella won the Achaia Championship and returned to national competition in the 2019–20 season, marking their comeback to the fourth tier after a seven-year absence. For the first time, they competed in the restructured Gamma Ethniki Amateur Division.

From the 2021–22 season to 2024–25, the club competed in the Achaia First Division. In 2025, they won the championship and took part in the 2025 Greek Amateur Promotion Championship, securing promotion back to the national divisions after a four-year absence.

== Stadium ==
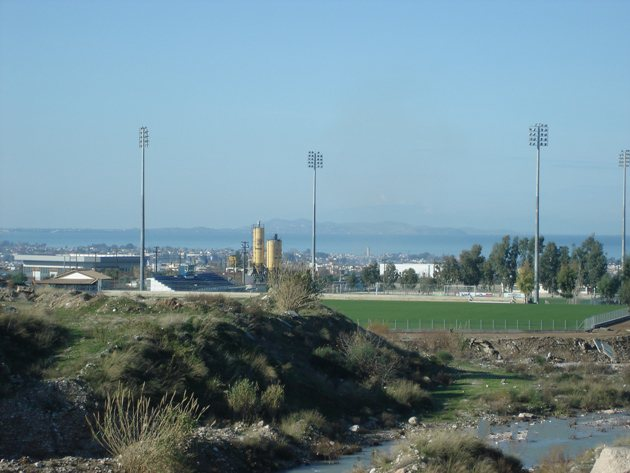
Fotis Aravantinos Stadium

For many years, the team used the Prosfygika Stadium located in the Prosfygika neighborhood of Patras as its home ground. Today, however, it plays at its privately owned stadium, constructed thanks to the efforts of former club president and player Fotis Aravantinos, Dimitris Andresas, and current president Panagiotis Thanopoulos.

The Prefectural Council of Achaia granted the necessary land to the club, and the stadium was completed in 2000. It is situated near the Glafkos River, close to the borders of the Petroto and Saravali districts.

Today, the club owns a sports center that includes a main pitch with stands, natural grass, lighting, changing rooms, and more, as well as two additional fields, one of which is also grass-covered.

Thyella’s home ground is officially named the Fotis Aravantinos Stadium, in honor of the club’s former player and president, who had envisioned the creation of a private stadium since the 1980s.

== Participation ==
- Beta Ethniki: 1964, 1965, 1966, 1967
- Gamma Ethniki: 1978, 1979, 1982, 2004, 2005, 2006, 2007, 2008, 2026
- Delta Ethniki: 1985, 1987, 2002, 2003, 2009, 2012, 2020, 2021

== Honours ==
- Delta Ethniki
  - Winners (1): 2002–03
- Achaea FCA Championship
  - Winners (12): 1950–51, 1951–52, 1952–53, 1962–63, 1972–73, 1980–81, 1983–84, 1985–86, 2000–01, 2010–11, 2018–19, 2024–25
- Achaea FCA Cup
  - Winners (2): 1972–73, 2023–24
- Achaea FCA Super Cup
  - Winners (2): 2019, 2025
