= Agios Dimitrios F.C. =

Greek association football club

Agios Dimitrios
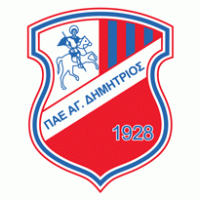
- Full name: Agios Dimitrios Football Club
- Nickname: Agioi (Saints)
- Founded: 1959; 67 years ago
- Ground: Agios Dimitrios Municipal Stadium
- Capacity: 1,920
- Chairman: Emmanouil Tzinevrakis
- Manager: Alvertos Papadakis
- League: Athens FCA First Division
- 2025–26: Athens FCA First Division (Group 1), 8th
Home colours	Away colours

Agios Dimitrios Football Club (Greek: Π.Α.Ε. Άγιος Δημήτριος), also known as Brahami, is a Greek association football club based in Agios Dimitrios, Athens, Greece.

The association was founded in 1959, based on the idea of a team of friends and residents of Agios Dimitrios. The club’s colours are blue and red. In 2002, Agios Dimitrios was changed from amateur association to professional, aiming at the promotion to Super League Greece, but they came in last place at the Beta Ethniki league that year. They are notable for winning the Athens Cup in 1975 and 1977.

In 2023, the club returned to the top division in Athens. In 2024, the club announced Sifis Venakis as head coach.

== Honours ==
=== Domestic ===
  - Gamma Ethniki: 2
    - 2006–07
  - Athens FCA First Division: 2
    - 1974–75, 1976–77
  - Athens FCA Cup: 2
    - 1976–77, 1999–00
