= Thermaikos Thermis F.C. =

Thermaikos Thermis
- Full name: Thermaikos Football Club
- Founded: 1949; 77 years ago
- Ground: Thermi Stadium
- Capacity: 5,998
- Chairman: Antonis Alexiou
- Manager: Spyros Gogolos
- League: Macedonia FCA First Division
- 2025–26: Gamma Ethniki (Group 1), 19th (relegated)
Home colours	Away colours

Thermaikos Thermis Football Club (Greek: Α.Π.Ο. Θερμαϊκός Θέρμης) are a Greek football club based in Thermi, Macedonia, Greece. They were founded in 1949.

== History ==
With their establishment in 1949, Thermaikos Thermis had a men's football section. Their seat is the Thermi Stadium, which has natural turf and has a seating capacity of 600. In the 2015–16 season, they competed in the A1 division of the Macedonia FCA League.

One of the most important moments in the history of Thermaikos was their promotion to the Delta Ethniki, where they competed for 3 years. They won the 2003–04 season Delta Ethniki's 2nd group title, followed by promotion to the Gamma Ethniki, where they competed for 7 years. They won the 2013–14 cup of Macedonia FCA League, defeating GS Ilioupolis with 3–0 and in 2018–19 Poseidon Michaniona with 1–3, while in 2015–16 season they lost in the cup final of the cup against Makedonikos with a 2–1. They've also won the Macedonia FCA League several times.

From the 2021–22 season to the 2025–26 season, Thermaikos competed in the third-tier Gamma Ethniki.

== Honours ==
- Delta Ethniki: 2003–04 (2nd Group)
- Macedonia FCA Cup: 2014, 2019
