= Enosi Alexandroupoli =

- Full name: Enosi Alexandroupoli Football Club
- Founded: 1995; 30 years ago
- Dissolved: 2010; 15 years ago
- Ground: Fotis Kosmas Stadium; Alexandroupoli
- Capacity: 7,000
Home colours	Away colours

Enosi Alexandroupoli (also named Enosi Thraki) was a football club based in Alexandroupoli, Greece.

== History ==
Orfeas Alexandroupoli was formed in the summer of 1995 from the merger of two local clubs, AO Alex and Ethnikos Alexandroupoli. The name of the team was Orfeas Alexandroupolis officially up to 1999. In 1999, the club changed ownership and it was renamed P.A. Enosi Thraki. Finally, in 2007, it was renamed to Enosi Alexandroupoli.

In the summer of 2008 the ownership changed. With the new owner came new manager and new players. The new season started well, but for financial reasons the team was dismissed from the championship and relegated to Delta Ethniki.

== Stadium ==
The team plays in the Fotis Kosmas Stadium, which is located in the centre of the city and has a capacity of 7,000 seats.

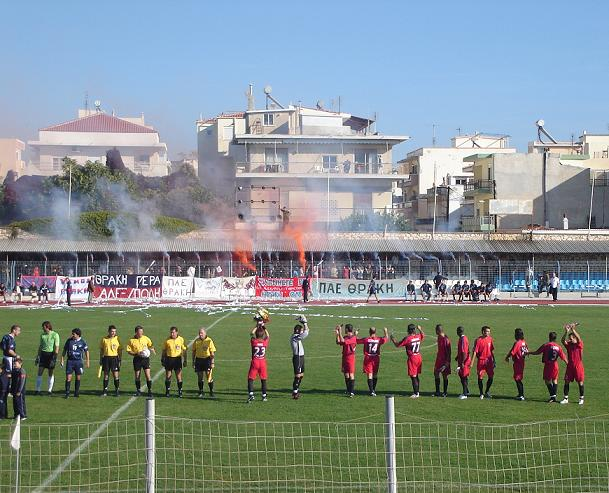
Inside Fotis Kosmas Stadium during a match versus Ionikos F.C. in 2005

== Past Highlights ==
- 1999-2000 Delta Ethniki
- 2000-2001 Delta Ethniki
- 2001-2002 Delta Ethniki
- 2002-2003 Delta Ethniki
- 2003-2004 Delta Ethniki
- 2004-2005 Gamma Ethniki (7th place)
- 2005-2006 Gamma Ethniki (8th place)
- 2006-2007 Gamma Ethniki (9th place)
- 2007-2008 Gamma Ethniki (6th place)
- 2008-2009 Gamma Ethniki (dismissed)
- 2009-2010 Delta Ethniki
