= 2002–03 Greek Football Cup =

2002–03 Greek Cup
Vodafone Greek Cup

Tournament details
- Country: Greece
- Teams: 52

Final positions
- Champions: PAOK (4th title)
- Runners-up: Aris

Tournament statistics
- Matches played: 101
- Goals scored: 236 (2.34 per match)
- Top goal scorer(s): Patrick Ogunsoto (5 goals)

The 2002–03 Greek Football Cup was the 61st edition of the Greek Football Cup. That season's edition was entitled "Vodafone Greek Cup" for sponsorship reasons.

== Tournament details ==
The two finalists were the arch-rivals, PAOK and Aris, meeting up again in a Cup final after 33 years. PAOK had to overcome some big obstacles to reach the final. They qualified against OFI on the away goals rule and eliminated league champions Olympiacos with two wins in the quarter-finals and Cup holders AEK Athens with 2–1 on aggregate in the semi-finals.

Aris had an easier path to the final. They eliminated PAS Giannina with two wins, Ethnikos Asteras with 3–2 on aggregate in the quarter-finals and qualified against Egaleo on the away goals rule in the semi-finals.

The final was held at Toumba Stadium, on 17 May 2003. PAOK defeated Aris by 1–0 with a goal scored by Georgiadis, who made an impressive individual effort, dribbling past a defender with his right foot, faking a shot with his left (outsmarting another defender and the goalkeeper in the process) and finishing with a swift side-foot kick (using his left again) that launched the ball up and into the back of the net. The assist was provided by Markos. Aris had a great chance to equalize late at the game, but the ball hit the post on Morris' effort.

During the postgame press conference, the manager of Aris, Georgios Firos made a complaint that the final should have been a two-legged tie because PAOK had the advantage of playing on home ground. Kaftanzoglio Stadium, a neutral ground and Thessaloniki 's largest stadium was under renovation for the 2004 Summer Olympic games. On 6 September 2002, the HFF Board decided that should the final be held in Thessaloniki—mandated if a local club qualified—Toumba Stadium would serve as the venue, being the second largest in the city. Nine days prior to the match, Aris submitted a request to the Federation demanding that the final be held at either the Kalamaria or Makedonikos stadium—both neutral venues with significantly lower capacities—or that a draw be held between Toumba Stadium and Kleanthis Vikelidis Stadium. Both proposals were rejected, as the HFF Board unanimously reaffirmed its September decision on the matter.

The manager of PAOK, Angelos Anastasiadis, became the first in the club's history to win the Cup both as a player (in 1974) and manager.

== Calendar ==
Round	Date(s)	Fixtures	Clubs	New entries
First Round	8–12, 14, 16–18, 21, 28 August & 4, 11, 12, 25 September 2002	52	52 → 26	52
Second Round	6, 7, 14, 21, 23, 30 October & 2, 6, 13 November 2002	20	26 → 16	none
Round of 16	4, 11, 18, 19 December 2002 & 8, 15, 22, 23, 29 January 2003	16	16 → 8	none
Quarter-finals	5, 19, 26 February & 5, 12, 19 March 2003	8	8 → 4	none
Semi-finals	9, 23 April & 7 May 2003	4	4 → 2	none
Final	17 May 2003	1	2 → 1	none

== Knockout phase ==
Each tie in the knockout phase, apart from the final, was played over two legs, with each team playing one leg at home. The team that scored more goals on aggregate over the two legs advanced to the next round. If the aggregate score was level, the away goals rule was applied, i.e. the team that scored more goals away from home over the two legs advanced. If away goals were also equal, then extra time was played. The away goals rule was again applied after extra time, i.e. if there were goals scored during extra time and the aggregate score was still level, the visiting team advanced by virtue of more away goals scored. If no goals were scored during extra time, the winners were decided by a penalty shoot-out. In the final, which were played as a single match, if the score was level at the end of normal time, extra time was played, followed by a penalty shoot-out if the score was still level.
The mechanism of the draws for each round is as follows:

- For the 1st Round draw, the 1st Division teams and the top 10 teams of the 2nd Division are seeded, the remaining teams are unseeded.
- From the 2nd Round draw onwards, there are no seedings.

== First round ==
The draw took place on 11 July 2002.

=== Seeding ===
Seeded	Unseeded
Olympiacos; AEK Athens; Panathinaikos; PAOK; Skoda Xanthi; Iraklis; Panionios; OFI; Aris; Egaleo; Akratitos; Ionikos; Panachaiki; PAS Giannina; Kallithea; Proodeftiki; Ethnikos Asteras; Apollon Kalamarias; Athinaikos; Panserraikos; Patraikos; Olympiacos Volos; Chalkidona; Paniliakos; Kalamata; Apollon Athens	Panegialios; Kerkyra; Kassandra; Fostiras; Kavala; Atromitos; Agios Nikolaos; Kilkisiakos; AEL; Ethnikos Piraeus; Marko; AO Chania; Leonidio; Trikala; Nafpaktiakos Asteras; Thrasyvoulos; Agios Dimitrios; Levadiakos; Ergotelis; Niki Volos; Poseidon Neon Poron; Agrotikos Asteras; ILTEX Lykoi; Acharnaikos; Vyzas Megara; Kastoria

=== Summary ===
Team 1	Agg.	Team 2	1st leg	2nd leg
Trikala	0–6	Kallithea	0–4	0–2
OFI	4–0	Kavala	4–0	0–0
Panionios	3–2	Marko	2–1	1–1
Ethnikos Asteras	2–1	Niki Volos	2–0	0–1
Athinaikos	2–3	Agios Dimitrios	1–1	1–2
PAS Giannina	3–1	Vyzas Megara	1–1	2–0
Egaleo	6–4	Agrotikos Asteras	3–1	3–3
Olympiacos Volos	1–1 (9–8 p)	Panegialios	1–0	0–1 (a.e.t.)
AEL	0–4	Skoda Xanthi	0–1	0–3
Panserraikos	2–6	Ergotelis	1–2	1–4
Nafpaktiakos Asteras	2–7	Panachaiki	1–5	1–2
Akratitos	8–0	Acharnaikos	3–0	5–0
Agios Nikolaos	2–4	Iraklis	2–3	0–1
Ethnikos Piraeus	0–7	Paniliakos	0–3	0–4
ILTEX Lykoi	0–5	Panathinaikos	0–2	0–3
Levadiakos	4–5	Apollon Kalamarias	2–2	2–3 (a.e.t.)
Chalkidona	6–1	Kastoria	4–0	2–1
Patraikos	3–2	Atromitos	1–1	2–1 (a.e.t.)
Leonidio	0–1	PAOK	0–1	0–0
Kilkisiakos	1–2	Kalamata	1–2	0–0
Kassandra	0–2	AEK Athens	0–2	0–0
AO Chania	0–6	Aris	0–4	0–2
Kerkyra	1–0	Proodeftiki	0–0	1–0
Fostiras	1–4	Olympiacos	0–2	1–2
Thrasyvoulos	0–3	Apollon Athens	0–2	0–1
Poseidon Neon Poron	0–4	Ionikos	0–1	0–3

=== Matches ===
17 August 2002
13:00 EEST

Trikala	0–4	Kallithea
	Report (page 1)	Gekas 9', 53'; Tsimplidis 15'; Kaounos 58'

Trikala Municipal Stadium, Trikala
Referee: Giannis Spyropoulos (Phthiotis)
25 September 2002
13:00 EEST

Kallithea	2–0	Trikala
Petković 10', 61'	Report (page 7)

Grigoris Lamprakis Stadium, Kallithea
Referee: Avraam Kemparidis (Thessaloniki)

Kallithea won 6–0 on aggregate

10 August 2002
13:00 EEST

OFI	4–0	Kavala
Gómez 30'; Soares 32'; Sapountzis 69'; Kiassos 73'	Report (page 1)

Theodoros Vardinogiannis Stadium, Heraklion
Referee: Kostas Finokaliotis (Athens)
4 September 2002
13:00 EEST

Kavala	0–0	OFI
	Report (page 7)

Anthi Karagianni Stadium, Kavala
Referee: Makis Efthimiadis (Drama)

OFI won 4–0 on aggregate

11 August 2002
13:00 EEST

Panionios	2–1	Marko
Vlček 50'; Mouzaoui 63'	Report (page 1)	Angos 34'

Nea Smyrni Stadium, Nea Smyrni
Referee: Frangiskos Somarakakis (Athens)
4 September 2002
13:00 EEST

Marko	1–1	Panionios
Angos 87'	Report (page 7)	Mouzaoui 81'

Municipal Stadium of Markopoulo, Markopoulo
Referee: Nikos Angelakis (Thessaloniki)

Panionios won 3–1 on aggregate

12 August 2002
13:00 EEST

Ethnikos Asteras	2–0	Niki Volos
Kolliakos 9', 34'	Report (page 1-2)

Michalis Kritikopoulos Stadium, Kaisariani
Referee: Theodoros Triantafyllidis (Piraeus)
18 August 2002
13:00 EEST

Niki Volos	1–0	Ethnikos Asteras
Nousias 70'	Report (page 7)

Pantelis Magoulas Stadium, Volos
Referee: D. Kyritsis (Larissa)

Ethnikos Asteras won 2–1 on aggregate

17 August 2002
13:00 EEST

Athinaikos	1–1	Agios Dimitrios
Touré 82'	Report (page 2)	Lazarou 72'

Vyronas National Stadium, Vyronas
Referee: I. Toumpanis (Athens)
12 September 2002
13:00 EEST

Agios Dimitrios	2–1	Athinaikos
Mitsakis 16', 69'	Report (page 7-8)	Bagayoko 76'

Agios Dimitrios Municipal Stadium, Agios Dimitrios
Referee: Giannis Krikkis (Trikala)

Agios Dimitrios won 3–2 on aggregate

10 August 2002
13:00 EEST

PAS Giannina	1–1	Vyzas Megara
Šarić 88'	Report (page 2)	Ropokis 69'

Zosimades Stadium, Ioannina
Referee: Efthimios Damianos (Kozani)
28 August 2002
13:00 EEST

Vyzas Megara	0–2	PAS Giannina
	Report (page 8)	Kržišnik 27'; Nagoli 85'

Megara Stadium, Megara
Referee: Charalampos Karatzas (Euboea)

PAS Giannina won 3–1 on aggregate

12 August 2002
13:00 EEST

Egaleo	3–1	Agrotikos Asteras
Edusei 51'; Fotakis 62'; Meidanis 76'	Report (page 2)	Dimitriadis 32'

Stavros Mavrothalassitis Stadium, Aigaleo
Referee: Giannis Tsachilidis (Piraeus)
11 September 2002
13:00 EEST

Agrotikos Asteras	3–3	Egaleo
Bekiaris 10'; Tsatsos 44'; Beniskos 47'	Report (page 8)	Symeonidis 8'; Papoutsis 64'; Wanga 70'

Agrotikos Asteras Stadium, Thessaloniki
Referee: Manolis Tapatzas (Thrace)

Egaleo won 6–4 on aggregate

10 August 2002
13:00 EEST

Olympiacos Volos	1–0	Panegialios
Cerović 17'	Report (page 2-3)

Volos Municipal Stadium, Volos
Referee: K. Andreopoulos (Larissa)
11 September 2002
13:00 EEST

Panegialios	1–0 (a.e.t.)	Olympiacos Volos
Athanasiou 48'	Report (page 8)
Penalties
	8–9

Aigio National Stadium, Aigio
Referee: Gerasimos Mazarakis (Kefalonia)

Olympiacos Volos won on penalties

12 August 2002
13:00 EEST

AEL	0–1	Skoda Xanthi
	Report (page 3)	Friesenbichler 59'

Alcazar Stadium, Larissa
Referee: Giannis Bisogiannis (Thessaloniki)
4 September 2002
13:00 EEST

Skoda Xanthi	3–0	AEL
Sfakianakis 47'; Terrão 50'; Ilia 89'	Report (page 8-9)

A.O. Xanthi Stadium, Xanthi
Referee: Kyros Vassaras (Thessaloniki)

Skoda Xanthi won 4–0 on aggregate

11 August 2002
13:00 EEST

Panserraikos	1–2	Ergotelis
Jovanović 82' (pen.)	Report (page 3)	Ogunsoto 14'; Markakis 67'

Serres Municipal Stadium, Serres
Referee: Petros Michailidis (Athens)
12 September 2002
13:00 EEST

Ergotelis	4–1	Panserraikos
Ogunsoto 23', 35', 75'; Gospodinov 37'	Report (page 9)	Savvidis 86'

Nikos Kazantzakis Stadium, Heraklion
Referee: Dimitris Christodoulakis (Rethymno)

Ergotelis won 6–2 on aggregate

16 August 2002
13:00 EEST

Nafpaktiakos Asteras	1–5	Panachaiki
Shishkov 67'	Report (page 3)	Vukčević 4', 60'; Morini 43', 57'; Papadopoulos 78'

Papacharalabeio Ethniko Stadio, Nafpaktos
Referee: Charalampos Patras (Corinthia)
25 September 2002
13:00 EEST

Panachaiki	2–1	Nafpaktiakos Asteras
Bantas 6'; Morini 52'	Report (page 9)	Shishkov 15'

Kostas Davourlis Stadium, Patras
Referee: Giannis Tsachilidis (Piraeus)

Panachaiki won 7–2 on aggregate

17 August 2002
13:00 EEST

Akratitos	3–0	Acharnaikos
Barkoglou 5'; Ziakas 29', 62'	Report (page 3)

Giannis Pathiakakis Stadium, Ano Liosia
Referee: Charalampos Patras (Corinthia)
25 September 2002
13:00 EEST

Acharnaikos	0–5	Akratitos
	Report (page 9)	Garozis 9', 90'; Ziakas 19', 65'; Barkoglou 48'

Acharnes Stadium, Acharnes
Referee: Christos Trikalis (Trikala)

Akratitos won 8–0 on aggregate

9 August 2002
13:00 EEST

Agios Nikolaos	2–3	Iraklis
Dedeletakis 64'; Makrakis 71'	Report (page 3-4)	Katsabis 13'; Kebadze 32', 33'

Agios Nikolaos Municipal Stadium, Agios Nikolaos
Referee: Giorgos Tsagarakis (Chania)
18 August 2002
13:00 EEST

Iraklis	1–0	Agios Nikolaos
Katsabis 61'	Report (page 9)

Kaftanzoglio Stadium, Thessaloniki
Referee: Romanos Kontogiannidis (Xanthi)

Iraklis won 4–2 on aggregate

10 August 2002
13:00 EEST

Ethnikos Piraeus	0–3	Paniliakos
	Report (page 4)	Manikas 7'; Marcora 9'; Spyropoulos 25'

Vyronas National Stadium, Vyronas
Referee: Giannis Peppas (Athens)
25 September 2002
13:00 EEST

Paniliakos	4–0	Ethnikos Piraeus
Spyropoulos 17'; Manikas 44'; Tsiolis 51'; Tsigas 70'	Report (page 10)

Pyrgos Stadium, Pyrgos
Referee: Stavros Georgopoulos (Arcadia)

Paniliakos won 7–0 on aggregate

10 August 2002
13:00 EEST

ILTEX Lykoi	0–2	Panathinaikos
	Report (page 4)	Konstantinidis 16'; Konstantinou 32'

Stelios Iliadis Stadium, Thessaloniki
Referee: Manolis Tapatzas (Thrace)
18 August 2002
13:00 EEST

Panathinaikos	3–0	ILTEX Lykoi
Liberopoulos 49'; Warzycha 66'; Vlaović 73'	Report (page 10)

Leoforos Alexandras Stadium, Ampelokipoi
Referee: Giannis Tsachilidis (Piraeus)

Panathinaikos won 5–0 on aggregate

14 August 2002
13:00 EEST

Levadiakos	2–2	Apollon Kalamarias
Karakatsanis 28'; Pastos 44'	Report (page 10)	Troupkos 37'; Zinho 82'

Levadia Municipal Stadium, Livadeia
Referee: Giannis Bisogiannis (Thessaloniki)
4 September 2002
13:00 EEST

Apollon Kalamarias	3–2 (a.e.t.)	Levadiakos
Zouboulis 33', 44'; Zinho 92'	Report (page 7)	Karakatsanis 40', 57'

Kalamaria Stadium, Thessaloniki
Referee: Lazaros Polatian (Pella)

Apollon Kalamarias won 5–4 on aggregate

16 August 2002
13:00 EEST

Chalkidona	4–0	Kastoria
Zacharopoulos 6', 51'; Manousakis 38'; Katemis 62'	Report (page 4-5)

Pantelis Nikolaidis Stadium, Nikaia
Referee: Emmanouil Vomvas (Lesbos)
4 September 2002
13:00 EEST

Kastoria	1–2	Chalkidona
Vlachos 33'	Report (page 10)	Kogioglou 28'; Apostolidis 87' (o.g.)

Municipal Stadium of Kastoria, Kastoria
Referee: Nikos Koulias (Thesprotia)

Chalkidona won 6–1 on aggregate

16 August 2002
13:00 EEST

Patraikos	1–1	Atromitos
Gebro 3'	Report (page 5)	Avramidis 36'

Prosfygika Stadium, Patras
Referee: Antonia Kokotou (Argolida)
28 August 2002
13:00 EEST

Atromitos	1–2 (a.e.t.)	Patraikos
Balogiannis 59'	Report (page 10-11)	Gebro 24'; Katsaros 95'

Peristeri Stadium, Peristeri
Referee: Pantelis Michalakis (Dodecanese)

Patraikos won 3–2 on aggregate

12 August 2002
13:00 EEST

Leonidio	0–1	PAOK
	Report (page 5)	Kafes 39'

Leonidio Municipal Stadium, Leonidio
Referee: Iraklis Tsikinis (Messenia)
4 September 2002
13:00 EEST

PAOK	0–0	Leonidio
	Report (page 11)

Toumba Stadium, Thessaloniki
Attendance: 591
Referee: Efthimios Damianos (Kozani)

PAOK won 1–0 on aggregate

11 August 2002
13:00 EEST

Kilkisiakos	1–2	Kalamata
Panteliadis 89' (pen.)	Report (page 5)	Goundoulakis 50'; Andreadis 79'

Municipal Stadium of Kilkis, Kilkis
Referee: Georgios Zolotas (Thessaly)
11 September 2002
13:00 EEST

Kalamata	0–0	Kilkisiakos
	Report (page 11)

Kalamata Municipal Stadium, Kalamata
Referee: Sotiris Tiligadas (Achaea)

Kalamata won 2–1 on aggregate

8 August 2002
19:00 EEST

Kassandra	0–2	AEK Athens
	Report (page 5)	Nikolaidis 57'; Zagorakis 90+1'

Municipal Stadium of Kassandreia, Kassandreia
Attendance: 500
Referee: Avraam Kebaridis (Thessaloniki)
11 September 2002
17:00 EEST

AEK Athens	0–0	Kassandra
	Report (page 11)

Nikos Goumas Stadium, Nea Filadelfeia
Attendance: 69
Referee: Giannis Kaminaris (Thessaly)

AEK Athens won 2–0 on aggregate.

11 August 2002
13:00 EEST

AO Chania	0–4	Aris
	Report (page 6)	Demba-Nyrén 33', 38'; Kyzeridis 35'; Knopper 60'

Perivolia Municipal Stadium, Chania
Referee: Vasilis Skoufitsas (Athens)
18 August 2002
13:00 EEST

Aris	2–0	AO Chania
Kyzeridis 32'; Šimić 40'	Report (page 11)

Aris Stadium, Thessaloniki
Referee: Giorgos Takidis (Kilkis)

Aris won 6–0 on aggregate

11 August 2002
13:00 EEST

Kerkyra	0–0	Proodeftiki
	Report (page 6)

Kerkyra Stadium, Corfu
Referee: Thanasis Briakos (Epirus)
28 August 2002
13:00 EEST

Proodeftiki	0–1	Kerkyra
	Report (page 11-12)	Sfakianakis 79'

Nikaia Municipal Stadium, Nikaia
Referee: Vasilis Terovitsas (Aetoloacarnania)

Kerkyra won 1–0 on aggregate

9 August 2002
13:00 EEST

Fostiras	0–2	Olympiacos
	Report (page 6)	Niniadis 40'; Alexandris 56'

Tavros Stadium, Tavros
Referee: Charalampos Karatzas (Euboea)
21 August 2002
13:00 EEST

Olympiacos	2–1	Fostiras
Choutos 72'; Zetterberg 81' (pen.)	Report (page 12)	Moutas 19'

Rizoupoli Stadium, Rizoupoli
Referee: Charalampos Patras (Corinthia)

Olympiacos won 4–1 on aggregate

9 August 2002
13:00 EEST

Thrasyvoulos	0–2	Apollon Athens
	Report (page 6)	Georgiev 14'; Basinas 26'

Fyli Municipal Stadium, Fyli
Referee: Giorgos Giannopoulos (Athens)
18 August 2002
13:00 EEST

Apollon Athens	1–0	Thrasyvoulos
Vlachos 83'	Report (page 12)

Rizoupoli Stadium, Rizoupoli
Referee: Dimitris Detsis (Athens)

Apollon Athens won 3–0 on aggregate

16 August 2002
13:00 EEST

Poseidon Neon Poron	0–1	Ionikos
	Report (page 6-7)	Shaid 18'

Neoi Poroi Stadium, Neoi Poroi
Referee: Giannis Kaminaris (Thessaly)
11 September 2002
13:00 EEST

Ionikos	3–0	Poseidon Neon Poron
Ofrydopoulos 48'; Makor 70' (pen.); Markomichalis 89'	Report (page 12)

Neapoli Stadium, Nikaia
Referee: Frangiskos Somarakakis (Athens)

Ionikos won 4–0 on aggregate

== Bracket ==
Second round
Iraklis	0	1	1
Panionios	0	2	2
Ionikos (bye)
AEK Athens	3	3	6
Chalkidona	1	0	1
Apollon Athens (bye)
PAOK	2	0	2
Olympiacos Volos	0	0	0
Kerkyra	0	0	0
OFI	1	3	4
Panachaiki (bye)
Kallithea	1	1	2
Olympiacos	4	0	4
Kalamata	1	0	1
Akratitos	1	2	3
Panathinaikos	1	0	1
Skoda Xanthi	0	0	0
Egaleo	2	2	4
Agios Dimitrios	0	2	2
Paniliakos (bye)
Patraikos	0	1	1
Aris	1	3	4
PAS Giannina (bye)
Apollon Kalamarias (bye)
Ergotelis	2	0	2
Ethnikos Asteras (a.e.t.)	0	3	3

Round of 16
Panionios	1	1	2
Ionikos	0	1	1
AEK Athens	2	3	5
Apollon Athens	0	0	0
PAOK (a)	0	1	1
OFI	0	1	1
Panachaiki	0	0	0
Olympiacos	2	0	2
Akratitos	0	0	0
Panathinaikos	1	3	4
Egaleo	4	2	6
Paniliakos	0	1	1
Aris	3	1	4
PAS Giannina	0	0	0
Apollon Kalamarias	0	1	1
Ethnikos Asteras	2	2	4

Quarter-finals
Panionios	1	2	3
AEK Athens	1	4	5
PAOK	3	2	5
Olympiacos	1	1	2
Panathinaikos	0	1	1
Egaleo	1	1	2
Aris	3	0	3
Ethnikos Asteras	1	1	2

Semi-finals
AEK Athens	0	1	1
PAOK	1	1	2
Egaleo	1	0	1
Aris (a)	1	0	1

Final
PAOK	1
Aris	0

== Second round ==
The draw took place on 27 September 2002.

=== Summary ===
Team 1	Agg.	Team 2	1st leg	2nd leg
Iraklis	1–2	Panionios	0–0	1–2
AEK Athens	6–1	Chalkidona	3–1	3–0
PAOK	2–0	Olympiacos Volos	2–0	0–0
Panathinaikos	1–0	Skoda Xanthi	1–0	0–0
Kalamata	1–3	Akratitos	1–1	0–2
Egaleo	4–2	Agios Dimitrios	2–0	2–2
Kallithea	2–4	Olympiacos	1–4	1–0
Patraikos	1–4	Aris	0–1	1–3
Kerkyra	0–4	OFI	0–1	0–3
Ergotelis	2–3	Ethnikos Asteras	2–0	0–3 (a.e.t.)
PAS Giannina	bye			
Apollon Athens	bye			
Apollon Kalamarias	bye			
Ionikos	bye			
Paniliakos	bye			
Panachaiki	bye			

=== Matches ===
21 October 2002
18:00 EEST

Iraklis	0–0	Panionios
	Report (page 13)

Kaftanzoglio Stadium, Thessaloniki
Referee: Giorgos Douros (Corinthia)
13 November 2002
17:00 EET

Panionios	2–1	Iraklis
Šiljak 73'; Bulut 88'	Report (page 15)	Hagan 4'

Nea Smyrni Stadium, Nea Smyrni
Referee: Thanasis Briakos (Epirus)

Panionios won 2–1 on aggregate.

7 October 2002
20:00 EEST

AEK Athens	3–1	Chalkidona
Maladenis 39'; Konstantinidis 59'; Ivić 60'	Report (page 13)	Kogioglou 64'

Nikos Goumas Stadium, Nea Filadelfeia
Attendance: 461
Referee: Christos Trikalis (Trikala)
6 November 2002
19:00 EET

Chalkidona	0–3	AEK Athens
	Report (page 15)	Nalitzis 11'; Wright 33'; Konstantinidis 42'

Neapoli Municipal Stadium, Nikaia
Attendance: 1,000
Referee: Giannis Spyropoulos (Phthiotis)

AEK Athens won 6–1 on aggregate.

23 October 2002
18:00 EEST

PAOK	2–0	Olympiacos Volos
Salpingidis 53'; Frousos 85'	Report (page 13)

Toumba Stadium, Thessaloniki
Referee: Romanos Kontogiannidis (Xanthi)
6 November 2002
15:00 EET

Olympiacos Volos	0–0	PAOK
	Report (page 15)

Volos Municipal Stadium, Volos
Referee: Dimitris Takidis (Kilkis)

PAOK won 2–0 on aggregate.

7 October 2002
18:00 EEST

Panathinaikos	1–0	Skoda Xanthi
Liberopoulos 4'	Report (page 13)

Leoforos Alexandras Stadium, Ampelokipoi
Referee: Nikos Angelakis (Thessaloniki)
6 November 2002
17:00 EET

Skoda Xanthi	0–0	Panathinaikos
	Report (page 15)

A.O. Xanthi Stadium, Xanthi
Referee: Kyros Vassaras (Thessaloniki)

Panathinaikos won 1–0 on aggregate.

2 October 2002
16:30 EEST

Kalamata	1–1	Akratitos
Ostrowski 74'	Report (page 13)	Garozis 33'

Kalamata Municipal Stadium, Kalamata
Referee: Ioannis Tsacheilidis (Piraeus)
14 November 2002
15:00 EET

Akratitos	2–0	Kalamata
Ražanauskas 19', 30'	Report (page 16)

Giannis Pathiakakis Stadium, Ano Liosia
Referee: Romanos Kontogiannidis (Xanthi)

Akratitos won 3–1 on aggregate.

30 October 2002
19:00 EET

Egaleo	2–0	Agios Dimitrios
Alexopoulos 50'; Makris 74'	Report (page 14)

Stavros Mavrothalassitis Stadium, Aigaleo
Referee: Vasilis Skoufitsas (Athens)
27 November 2002
19:30 EET

Agios Dimitrios	2–2	Egaleo
Karalagas 3'; Mitsakis 90' (pen.)	Report (page 16)	Nikolopoulos 55'; Makris 59'

Agios Dimitrios Municipal Stadium, Agios Dimitrios
Referee: Ioannis Tsacheilidis (Piraeus)

Egaleo won 4–2 on aggregate.

6 October 2002
16:00 EEST

Kallithea	1–4	Olympiacos
Gekas 87'	Report (page 14)	Zetterberg 60'; Dracena 74'; Giovanni 77'; Alexandris 79'

Grigoris Lamprakis Stadium, Kallithea
Attendance: 1,621
Referee: Iraklis Tsikinis (Messenia)
6 November 2002
15:00 EET

Olympiacos	0–1	Kallithea
	Report (page 16)	Tsiblidis 81'

Rizoupoli Stadium, Rizoupoli
Attendance: 967
Referee: Vasilis Terovitsas (Aetoloacarnania)

Olympiacos won 4–2 on aggregate.

6 October 2002
16:00 EEST

Patraikos	0–1	Aris
	Report (page 14)	Kyzeridis 73'

Prosfygika Stadium, Patras
Referee: Giorgos Tsangarakis (Chania)
14 November 2002
17:30 EET

Aris	3–1	Patraikos
Kousas 32', 70'; Epalle 34'	Report (page 16)	Koltsis 14'

Aris Stadium, Thessaloniki
Referee: Manolis Tapatzas (Thrace)

Aris won 4–1 on aggregate.

30 October 2002
15:00 EET

Kerkyra	0–1	OFI
	Report (page 14)	Zafirakis 46' (o.g.)

Kerkyra Stadium, CorfU
Referee: Efthimios Damianos (Kozani)
16 November 2002
15:00 EET

OFI	3–0	Kerkyra
Soares 13', 75'; Chrysafis 37'	Report (page 17)

Theodoros Vardinogiannis Stadium, Heraklion
Referee: Frangiskos Somarakakis (Athens)

OFI won 4–0 on aggregate.

30 October 2002
15:00 EET

Ergotelis	2–0	Ethnikos Asteras
Ogunsoto 66'; Soutzis 69'	Report (page 14)

Nikos Kazantzakis Stadium, Heraklion
Referee: Stavros Georgopoulos (Arcadia)
13 November 2002
17:00 EET

Ethnikos Asteras	3–0 (a.e.t.)	Ergotelis
Kolliakos 1'; Papadimitriou 57'; Frandsen 119'	Report (page 17)

Michalis Kritikopoulos Stadium, Kaisariani
Referee: Spyros Vasiliou (Elis)

Ethnikos Asteras won 3–2 on aggregate.

== Round of 16 ==
The draw took place on 28 November 2002.

=== Summary ===
Team 1	Agg.	Team 2	1st leg	2nd leg
AEK Athens	5–0	Apollon Athens	2–0	3–0
PAOK	(a) 1–1	OFI	0–0	1–1
Aris	4–0	PAS Giannina	3–0	1–0
Panionios	2–1	Ionikos	1–0	1–1
Panachaiki	0–2	Olympiacos	0–2	0–0
Egaleo	6–1	Paniliakos	4–0	2–1
Apollon Kalamarias	1–4	Ethnikos Asteras	0–2	1–2
Akratitos	0–4	Panathinaikos	0–1	0–3

=== Matches ===
19 December 2002
19:00 EET

AEK Athens	2–0	Apollon Athens
Nalitzis 36'; Centeno 43'	Report (page 17)

Nikos Goumas Stadium, Nea Filadelfeia
Attendance: 134
Referee: Kostas Finokaliotis (Athens)
29 January 2003
19:00 EET

Apollon Athens	0–3	AEK Athens
	Report (page 19)	Solakis 70', 89'; Petkov 88'

Agios Dimitrios Municipal Stadium, Agios Dimitrios
Attendance: 524
Referee: Vasilis Skoufitsas (Athens)

AEK Athens won 5–0 on aggregate.

19 December 2002
17:00 EET

PAOK	0–0	OFI
	Report (page 17)

Toumba Stadium, Thessaloniki
Referee: Giorgos Kaznaferis (Athens)
8 January 2003
17:00 EET

OFI	1–1	PAOK
Soares 23'	Report (page 19)	Salpingidis 61'

Theodoros Vardinogiannis Stadium, Heraklion
Referee: Giorgos Douros (Corinthia)

PAOK won on away goals.

11 December 2002
19:00 EET

Aris	3–0	PAS Giannina
Kazantzis 2', 17'; Papadopoulos 52' (pen.)	Report (page 18)

Aris Stadium, Thessaloniki
Referee: Dimitris Takidis (Kilkis)
22 January 2003
17:00 EET

PAS Giannina	0–1	Aris
	Report (page 19)	Mallous 12'

Zosimades Stadium, Ioannina
Referee: Vasilis Terovitsas (Aetoloacarnania)

Aris won 4–0 on aggregate.

18 December 2002
17:00 EET

Panionios	1–0	Ionikos
Šiljak 89'	Report (page 18)

Nea Smyrni Stadium, Nea Smyrni
Referee: Kyros Vassaras (Thessaloniki)
15 January 2003
17:00 EET

Ionikos	1–1	Panionios
Makor 25'	Report (page 20)	Mantzios 88' (pen.)

Neapoli Stadium, Nikaia
Referee: Giorgos Borovilos (Arcadia)

Panionios won 2–1 on aggregate.

4 December 2002
19:00 EET

Panachaiki	0–2	Olympiacos
	Report (page 18)	Castillo 68'; Choutos 84'

Kostas Davourlis Stadium, Patras
Attendance: 1,101
Referee: Thanasis Briakos (Epirus)
22 January 2003
19:30 EET

Olympiacos	0–0	Panachaiki
	Report (page 20)

Rizoupoli Stadium, Rizoupoli
Attendance: 1,618
Referee: Charalampos Karatzas (Euboea)

Olympiacos won 2–0 on aggregate.

4 December 2002
17:00 EET

Egaleo	4–0	Paniliakos
Skopelitis 13'; Nikolopoulos 44'; Makris 58', 66'	Report (page 18)

Stavros Mavrothalassitis Stadium, Aigaleo
Referee: Giannis Bisogiannis (Thessaloniki)
23 January 2003
17:00 EET

Paniliakos	1–2	Egaleo
Manikas 5'	Report (page 20)	Goudelitsas 71'; Angos 90'

Pyrgos Stadium, Pyrgos
Referee: Stavros Georgopoulos (Arcadia)

Egaleo won 6–1 on aggregate.

11 December 2002
17:00 EET

Apollon Kalamarias	0–2	Ethnikos Asteras
	Report (page 18)	Kolliakos 17'; Giannakidis 86'

Kalamaria Stadium, Thessaloniki
Referee: Christos Vasiliou (Thessaly)
8 January 2003
19:30 EET

Ethnikos Asteras	2–1	Apollon Kalamarias
Giannakidis 25', 55'	Report (page 20)	McKeown 35'

Michalis Kritikopoulos Stadium, Kaisariani
Referee: Gerasimos Mazarakis (Kefalonia)

Ethnikos Asteras won 4–1 on aggregate.

18 December 2002
19:00 EET

Akratitos	0–1	Panathinaikos
	Report (page 19)	Olisadebe 46'

Giannis Pathiakakis Stadium, Ano Liosia
Referee: Ioannis Tsacheilidis (Piraeus)
15 January 2003
19:30 EET

Panathinaikos	3–0	Akratitos
Konstantinou 45'; Vlaović 52'; Warzycha 65'	Report (page 20)

Leoforos Alexandras Stadium, Ampelokipoi
Referee: Christoforos Zografos (Athens)

Panathinaikos won 4–0 on aggregate.

== Quarter-finals ==
The draw took place on 30 January 2003.

=== Summary ===
Team 1	Agg.	Team 2	1st leg	2nd leg
Panathinaikos	1–2	Egaleo	0–1	1–1
Panionios	3–5	AEK Athens	1–1	2–4
Aris	3–2	Ethnikos Asteras	3–1	0–1
PAOK	5–2	Olympiacos	3–1	2–1

=== Matches ===
5 February 2003
19:00 EET

Panathinaikos	0–1	Egaleo
	Report (page 21)	Chloros 84'

Leoforos Alexandras Stadium, Ampelokipoi
Attendance: 1,663
Referee: Ioannis Spyropoulos (Phthiotis)
5 March 2003
17:00 EET

Egaleo	1–1	Panathinaikos
Agritis 43'	Report (page 22)	Sapanis 5'

Stavros Mavrothalassitis Stadium, Aigaleo
Attendance: 1,295
Referee: Vasilis Terovitsas (Aetoloacarnania)

Egaleo won 2–1 on aggregate.

5 February 2003
17:00 EET

Panionios	1–1	AEK Athens
Mantzios 88'	Report (page 21)	Maladenis 40'

Nea Smyrni Stadium, Nea Smyrni
Attendance: 1,506
Referee: Kyros Vassaras (Thessaloniki)
5 March 2003
19:30 EET

AEK Athens	4–2	Panionios
Katsouranis 26'; Nalitzis 37', 75'; Konstantinidis 43'	Report (page 22)	Šiljak 3'; Bulut 8'

Nikos Goumas Stadium, Nea Filadelfeia
Attendance: 2,473
Referee: Nikos Aggelakis (Thessaloniki)

AEK Athens won 5–3 on aggregate.

19 February 2003
19:00 EET

Aris	3–1	Ethnikos Asteras
Demba-Nyrén 21'; Papadopoulos 44' (pen.); Källander 71'	Report (page 21)	Giannakidis 62'

Aris Stadium, Thessaloniki
Referee: Dimitris Takidis (Kilkis)
19 March 2003
19:00 EET

Ethnikos Asteras	1–0	Aris
Louka 54'	Report (page 22)

Michalis Kritikopoulos Stadium, Kaisariani
Referee: Manolis Tapatzas (Thrace)

Aris won 3–2 on aggregate.

26 February 2003
19:00 EET

PAOK	3–1	Olympiacos
Georgiadis 10'; Markos 31'; Okkas 86'	Report (page 21)	Giannakopoulos 44' (pen.)

Toumba Stadium, Thessaloniki
Attendance: 17,647
Referee: Giorgos Tsangarakis (Chania)
12 March 2003
19:00 EET

Olympiacos	1–2	PAOK
Choutos 76'	Report (page 22)	Georgiadis 30'; Okkas 32'

Rizoupoli Stadium, Rizoupoli
Attendance: 11,466
Referee: Giorgos Douros (Corinthia)

PAOK won 5–2 on aggregate.

== Semi-finals ==
The draw took place on 20 March 2003.

=== Summary ===
Team 1	Agg.	Team 2	1st leg	2nd leg
Egaleo	1–1 (a)	Aris	1–1	0–0
AEK Athens	1–2	PAOK	0–1	1–1

=== Matches ===
9 April 2003
20:00 EEST

Egaleo	1–1	Aris
Skopelitis 7'	Report	Epalle 65'

Stavros Mavrothalassitis Stadium, Aigaleo
Referee: Giorgos Douros (Corinthia)
23 April 2003
17:00 EEST

Aris	0–0	Egaleo
	Report (page 23)

Aris Stadium, Thessaloniki
Referee: Makis Efthimiadis (Drama)

Aris won on away goals.

23 April 2003
19:45 EEST

AEK Athens	0–1	PAOK
	Report (page 23)	Yiasoumi 40'

Nikos Goumas Stadium, Nea Filadelfeia
Attendance: 10,082
Referee: Giorgos Borovilos (Arcadia)
7 May 2003
20:00 EEST

PAOK	1–1	AEK Athens
Okkas 88'	Report	Maladenis 8'

Toumba Stadium, Thessaloniki
Attendance: 8,363
Referee: Thanasis Briakos (Epirus)

PAOK won 2–1 on aggregate.

== Final ==
17 May 2003
21:15 EEST

Aris	0–1	PAOK
	Report	Georgiadis 24'

Toumba Stadium, Thessaloniki
Attendance: 18,703
Referee: Giorgos Douros (Corinthia)

== Top scorers ==
Rank	Player	Club	Goals
1	(Nigeria) Patrick Ogunsoto	Ergotelis	5
2	(Greece) Panagiotis Ziakas	Akratitos	4
2	(Greece) Thomas Makris	Egaleo	4
2	(Greece) Dimitris Nalitzis	AEK Athens	4
2	(Brazil) Alessandro Soares	OFI	4
2	(Greece) Pantelis Kolliakos	Ethnikos Asteras	4
2	(Greece) Savvas Giannakidis	Ethnikos Asteras	4
8	(Greece) Loukas Karakatsanis	Levadiakos	3
8	(Greece) Theofanis Gekas	Kallithea	3
8	(Greece) Lampros Choutos	Olympiacos	3
8	(Italy) Emanuele Morini	Panachaiki	3
8	(Greece) Fotis Mitsakis	Agios Dimitrios	3
8	(Greece) Ilias Manikas	Paniliakos	3
8	(Greece) Stratos Garozis	Akratitos	3
8	(Greece) Nikos Kyzeridis	Aris	3
8	(Greece) Christos Maladenis	AEK Athens	3
8	(Slovenia) Ermin Šiljak	Panionios	3
8	(Cyprus) Ioannis Okkas	PAOK	3
8	(Greece) Sotiris Konstantinidis	AEK Athens	3
8	(The Gambia) Njogu Demba-Nyrén	Aris	3
8	(Greece) Georgios Georgiadis	PAOK	3
