= 2005–06 Greek Football Cup =

2005–06 Greek Cup
SINCO Greek Cup

Tournament details
- Country: Greece
- Teams: 65

Final positions
- Champions: Olympiacos (22nd title)
- Runners-up: AEK Athens

Tournament statistics
- Matches played: 73
- Goals scored: 180 (2.47 per match)
- Top goal scorer(s): Panagiotis Bekiaris (5 goals)

The 2005–06 Greek Football Cup was the 64th edition of the Greek Football Cup, competition. This edition was entitled "SINCO Greek Cup" for sponsorship reasons. The competition started on 20 August 2005 and concluded on 10 May 2006 with the final, held at Pankritio Stadium. Olympiacos won the trophy with a 3-0 victory over AEK Athens.

== Calendar ==
Round	Date(s)	Fixtures	Clubs	New entries	Leagues entering
Qualifying Round	21 August 2005	1	65 → 64	2	Gamma Ethniki
First Round	20, 21, 24 August 2005	16	64 → 48	31	Gamma Ethniki
Second Round	31 August, 1 September 2005	16	48 → 32	16	Beta Ethniki
Round of 32	26, 27 October, 8–10 November 2005	16	32 → 16	16	Alpha Ethniki
Round of 16	20–22 December 2005 & 11 January 2006	11	16 → 8	none	none
Quarter-finals	31 January & 1, 2, 7–9, 22 February 2006	8	8 → 4	none	none
Semi-finals	21, 22 March & 12 April 2006	4	4 → 2	none	none
Final	10 May 2006	1	2 → 1	none	none

== Knockout phase ==
Each tie in the knockout phase, apart from the quarter-finals and the semi-finals, was played by a single match. If the score was level at the end of normal time, extra time was played, followed by a penalty shoot-out if the score was still level. In the quarter-finals and the semi-finals were played over two legs, with each team playing one leg at home. The team that scored more goals on aggregate over the two legs advanced to the next round. If the aggregate score was level, the away goals rule was applied, i.e. the team that scored more goals away from home over the two legs advanced. If away goals were also equal, then extra time was played. The away goals rule was again applied after extra time, i.e. if there were goals scored during extra time and the aggregate score was still level, the visiting team advanced by virtue of more away goals scored. If no goals were scored during extra time, the winners were decided by a penalty shoot-out. In the round of 16, if the score was level at the end of normal time the two-legged rule was applied.
The mechanism of the draws for each round is as follows:

- In the draw for the second round, the teams from the second division are seeded and the winners from the first round were unseeded. The seeded teams are drawn against the unseeded teams.
- In the draw for the third round, the teams from the first division are seeded and the winners from the second round were unseeded. The seeded teams are drawn against the unseeded teams.
- In the draws for the Round of 32 onwards, there are no seedings and teams from the different group can be drawn against each other.

== Qualifying round ==
The draw took place on 11 August 2005.

=== Summary ===
Team 1	Score	Team 2
21 August 2005
Atsalenios	2–1	Agios Dimitrios

=== Matches ===
21 August 2005
13:00 EEST

Atsalenios	2–1	Agios Dimitrios
Oum 71', 74'	Report	Georgiadis 60' (pen.)

Atsalenios Stadium, Heraklion
Referee: Konstantinos Ioannidis (Piraeus)

== First round ==
The draw took place on 11 August 2005.

=== Summary ===
Team 1	Score	Team 2
20 August 2005
Ptolemaida-Lignitorikhi	0–1	Anagennisi Karditsa
Keratsini	0–0 (2–4 p)	Doxa Drama
AE Giannena	1–4	Enosi Thraki
Thyella Patras	4–1	Ionia 2000 Chania
Agrotikos Asteras	6–2	Vyzas Megara
21 August 2005
Lamia	1–2	Ethnikos Piraeus
Achaiki	1–2	Asteras Tripolis
Panetolikos	1–1 (6–7 p)	Aiolikos
PAS Giannina	3–0	Apollon Athens
Lilas Vasilikou	1–1 (2–4 p)	Panthrakikos
Pierikos	3–0	Messiniakos
Anagennisi Arta	2–1	Acharnaikos
Trikala	2–1	Kozani
24 August 2005
Parrodiakos/Diagoras	3–0	Thermaikos
Polykastro	2–0	Atsalenios
Kavala	3–0	Rodos

=== Matches ===
20 August 2005
13:00 EEST

Ptolemaida-Lignitorikhi	0–1	Anagennisi Karditsa
	Report	Govaris 17'

Emilios Theofanidis Stadium, Ptolemaida
Referee: Konstantinos Konstantinidis (Thessaloniki)

20 August 2005
13:00 EEST

Keratsini	0–0 (a.e.t.)	Doxa Drama
	Report
Penalties
	2–4

Panagiotis Salpeas Stadium, Piraeus
Referee: Nikolaos Fessaras (Dodecanese)

20 August 2005
13:00 EEST

AE Giannena	1–4	Enosi Thraki
Iordanopoulos 80'	Report	Manafis 16'; Papandreou 68'; Lampidis 71'; Nicácio 73'

Katsikas Stadium, Katsikas
Referee: Dimitrios Koutsopoulos (Karditsa)

20 August 2005
13:00 EEST

Thyella Patras	4–1	Ionia 2000 Chania
Mangan 8'; Alexandropoulos 17', 52', 80'	Report	Pangalos 44'

Fotis Aravantinos Stadium, Patras
Referee: Konstantinos Tzouvanos (Arta)

20 August 2005
13:00 EEST

Agrotikos Asteras	6–2	Vyzas Megara
Bekiaris 26', 61'; Tsouklis 49', 75'; Kalliakis 50'; Papadopoulos 65'	Report	Roussos 45'; Sopiadis 78'

Agrotikos Asteras Stadium, Thessaloniki
Referee: Giannis Papoutsis (Serres)

21 August 2005
13:00 EEST

Lamia	1–2	Ethnikos Piraeus
Shalamanov 90'	Report	Vidalis 4'; Karamalikis 75'

Lamia Municipal Stadium, Lamia
Referee: Periklis Giolias (Athens)

21 August 2005
13:00 EEST

Achaiki	1–2	Asteras Tripolis
Filippas 56' (pen.)	Report	Golias 60'; Platakis 75'

Kato Achaea Municipal Stadium, Kato Achaia
Referee: Georgios Konstantinou (Aetoloacarnania)

21 August 2005
13:00 EEST

Panetolikos	1–1 (a.e.t.)	Aiolikos
Xevgenis 46'	Report	Karydis 89'
Penalties
	6–7

Panetolikos Stadium, Agrinio
Referee: Georgios Kandris (Elis)

21 August 2005
13:00 EEST

PAS Giannina	3–0	Apollon Athens
Providas 25'; Kaounos 59' (pen.), 61'	Report

Zosimades Stadium, Ioannina
Referee: Marios Lampropoulos (Elis)

21 August 2005
13:00 EEST

Lilas Vasilikou	1–1 (a.e.t.)	Panthrakikos
Papaioannou 95'	Report	Andreev 105'
Penalties
	2–4

Municipal Ground of Vasiliko, Vasiliko
Referee: Athanasios Vasiliou (Thessaly)

21 August 2005
13:00 EEST

Pierikos	3–0	Messiniakos
Makris 28'; Kyvelidis 51'; Makiesse 78'	Report

Katerini Stadium, Katerini
Referee: Michalis Tsitsolkos (Kilkis)

21 August 2005
13:00 EEST

Anagennisi Arta	2–1	Thrasyvoulos
Dalakas 11'; Basioukas 71'	Report	Semos 59'

Arta Stadium, Arta
Referee: Panagiotis Karagounias (Achaea)

21 August 2005
13:00 EEST

Trikala	2–1	Kozani
Angelopoulos 15'; Kalogiros 74'	Report	Adamidis 90'

Trikala Municipal Stadium, Trikala
Referee: Georgios Tzovaras (Phthiotis)

24 August 2005
13:00 EEST

Parrodiakos/Diagoras	3–0	Thermaikos
Abílio 2'; Velis 78', 89' (pen.)	Report

Diagoras Stadium, Rhodes
Referee: Andreas Pappas (Athens)

24 August 2005
13:00 EEST

Polykastro	2–0	Atsalenios
Oum 5' (o.g.); Zandidis 30'	Report

Kilkis Municipal Stadium, Kilkis
Referee: Dimitrios Konstantinidis (Kavala)

24 August 2005
13:00 EEST

Kavala	3–0	Rodos
Andreadis 61'; Skarlatos 90'; Chatziantonis 90+1'	Report

Anthi Karagianni Stadium, Kavala
Referee: Antonis Pavlidis (Chalkidiki)

== Second round ==
The draw took place on 11 August 2005, after the First Round draw.

=== Summary ===
Team 1	Score	Team 2
31 August 2005
Asteras Tripolis	1–0	Chaidari
Anagennisi Karditsa	0–4	Ilisiakos
PAS Giannina	2–0	Kerkyra
Doxa Drama	0–1	Panachaiki 2005
Anagennisi Arta	2–3	Thrasyvoulos
Enosi Thraki	2–1	Kalamata
Polykastro	0–5	Ergotelis
Thyella Patras	1–1 (3–5 p)	Veria
1 September 2005
Aiolikos	1–2	Niki Volos
Agrotikos Asteras	3–1	Kastoria
Parrodiakos/Diagoras	1–1 (4–5 p)	Panserraikos
Trikala	0–2	Ethnikos Asteras
Kavala	1–2 (a.e.t.)	Paniliakos
Ethnikos Piraeus	6–1	Proodeftiki
Pierikos	2–2 (3–4 p)	Olympiacos Volos
Panthrakikos	2–1	Aris

=== Matches ===
31 August 2005
13:00 EEST

Asteras Tripolis	1–0	Chaidari
Anastasakos 89'	Report

Asteras Tripolis Stadium, Tripoli
Referee: Christos Apostolidis (Piraeus)

31 August 2005
13:00 EEST

Anagennisi Karditsa	0–4	Ilisiakos
	Report	Rincón 20'; Staikos 24'; Gospodinov 40'; Kampas 42'

Municipal Stadium of Karditsa, Karditsa
Referee: Vasilios Argyropoulos (Kastoria)

31 August 2005
13:00 EEST

PAS Giannina	2–0	Kerkyra
Tatsis 45'; Kaounos 75'	Report

Zosimades Stadium, Ioannina
Referee: Christos Stathopoulos (Achaea)

31 August 2005
13:00 EEST

Doxa Drama	0–1	Panachaiki 2005
	Report	Tzanetakis 90+1'

Doxa Drama Stadium, Drama
Referee: Georgios Baliozoglou (Thessaloniki)

31 August 2005
13:00 EEST

Anagennisi Arta	2–3	Thrasyvoulos
Pargov 57'; Dalakas 75'	Report	Angos 35', 52'; Syros 68'

Arta Stadium, Arta
Referee: Nikolaos Athanasiou (Thesprotia)

31 August 2005
13:00 EEST

Enosi Thraki	2–1	Kalamata
Papandreou 57', 90+3'	Report	Poulakos 84'

Fotis Kosmas Stadium, Alexandroupolis
Referee: Nathanail Charalampidis (Kavala)

31 August 2005
17:00 EEST

Polykastro	0–5	Ergotelis
	Report	Ogunsoto 50', 56'; Načevski 58', 72'; Soutzis 73'

Kilkis Municipal Stadium, Kilkis
Referee: Nikolaos Tsakiridis (Serres)

31 August 2005
13:00 EEST

Thyella Patras	1–1 (a.e.t.)	Veria
Efthymiadis 25'	Report	Voskaridis 83'
Penalties
	3–5

Fotis Aravantinos Stadium, Patras
Referee: Stavros Georgopoulos (Arcadia)

1 September 2005
13:00 EEST

Aiolikos	1–2	Niki Volos
Branežac 76'	Report	Balafas 12'; Saitiotis 37'

Mytilene Municipal Stadium, Mytilene
Referee: Christos Iatrakis (Athens)

1 September 2005
13:00 EEST

Agrotikos Asteras	3–1 (a.e.t.)	Kastoria
F. Papadopoulos 9'; Bekiaris 36', 60'	Report	Thomaidis 75'

Agrotikos Asteras Stadium, Thessaloniki
Referee: Giorgos Daloukas (Thessaly)

1 September 2005
13:00 EEST

Parrodiakos/Diagoras	1–1 (a.e.t.)	Panserraikos
Abílio 37' (pen.)	Report	Meijide 30'
Penalties
	4–5

Diagoras Stadium, Rhodes
Referee: Konstantinos Papastamatis (Athens)

1 September 2005
13:00 EEST

Trikala	0–2	Ethnikos Asteras
	Report	Mitsis 36'; Paraskevaidis 62'

Trikala Municipal Stadium, Trikala
Referee: Giannis Stavridis (Piraeus)

1 September 2005
13:00 EEST

Kavala	1–2 (a.e.t.)	Paniliakos
Papadopoulos 26'	Report	Bris 41'; Dimitrakopoulos 111'

Anthi Karagianni Stadium, Kavala
Referee: Georgios Zolotas (Thessaly)

1 September 2005
13:00 EEST

Ethnikos Piraeus	6–1	Proodeftiki
Morales 27'; Vidalis 31'; Karamalikis 43', 47'; Damiao 65'; Karakanov 73'	Report	Karagiannis 59'

Hellinikon Stadium, Elliniko
Referee: Konstantinos Vasilias (Euboea)

1 September 2005
13:00 EEST

Pierikos	2–2 (a.e.t.)	Olympiacos Volos
Pappas 23' (pen.); Kyuchukov 25' (o.g.)	Report	Savić 20'; Milovanović 77'
Penalties
	3–4

Katerini Stadium, Katerini
Referee: Christos Stamatis (Phthiotis)

1 September 2005
13:00 EEST

Panthrakikos	2–1	Aris
Souanis 27'; Mouratidis 41'	Report	Cáceres 61'

Panthessaliko Stadium, Volos
Referee: Theodoros Gaitatzis (Drama)

== Bracket ==
Round of 32
Thrasyvoulos	2
Atromitos	0
Paniliakos	0
Olympiacos	4
Veria	0
Skoda Xanthi	2
Panachaiki 2005 (p)	1(4)
Iraklis	1(2)
Panserraikos	0
AEL	1
Asteras Tripolis	0(2)
Apollon Kalamarias (p)	0(3)
Panthrakikos	2(5)
Akratitos (p)	2(6)
Ilisiakos	0
Egaleo	2
Enosi Thraki	0(4)
Ionikos (p)	0(5)
Niki Volos (p)	1(3)
OFI	1(2)
PAS Giannina	0
AEK Athens	3
Ethnikos Piraeus (p)	1(4)
Kallithea	1(2)
Ethnikos Asteras	1
Levadiakos	0
Olympiacos Volos	0
Panionios	2
Agrotikos Asteras (p)	1(5)
PAOK	1(4)
Ergotelis	1
Panathinaikos	0

Round of 16
Thrasyvoulos	0
Olympiacos	2
Skoda Xanthi	1
Panachaiki 2005	0
AEL	0	2	2
Apollon Kalamarias	0	1	1
Akratitos (p)	0	1	1(6)
Egaleo	0	1	1(5)
Ionikos	1
Niki Volos	4
AEK Athens (p)	1	1	2(4)
Ethnikos Piraeus	1	1	2(3)
Ethnikos Asteras	2
Panionios	1
Agrotikos Asteras	2
Ergotelis	0

Quarter-finals
Olympiacos	1	1	2
Skoda Xanthi	1	0	1
AEL	1	1	2
Akratitos	0	0	0
Niki Volos	0	0	0
AEK Athens	0	2	2
Ethnikos Asteras	1	0	1
Agrotikos Asteras	1	4	5

Semi-finals
Olympiacos	3	1	4
AEL	1	0	1
AEK Athens	3	0	3
Agrotikos Asteras	0	1	1

Final
Olympiacos	3
AEK Athens	0

== Round of 32 ==
The draw took place on 11 August 2005.

=== Summary ===
Team 1	Score	Team 2
Ilisiakos	0–2	Egaleo
Ethnikos Piraeus	1–1 (4–2 p)	Kallithea
Asteras Tripolis	0–0 (2–3 p)	Apollon Kalamarias
Panachaiki 2005	1–1 (4–2 p)	Iraklis
Niki Volos	1–1 (3–2 p)	OFI
Enosi Thraki	0–0 (4–5 p)	Ionikos
PAS Giannina	0–3	AEK Athens
Veria	0–2	Skoda Xanthi
Panthrakikos	2–2 (5–6 p)	Akratitos
Agrotikos Asteras	1–1 (5–4 p)	PAOK
Panserraikos	0–1	AEL
Ergotelis	1–0	Panathinaikos
Olympiacos Volos	0–2	Panionios
Paniliakos	0–4	Olympiacos
Thrasyvoulos	2–0	Atromitos
Ethnikos Asteras	1–0	Levadiakos

=== Matches ===
26 October 2005
15:30 EET

Ilisiakos	0–2	Egaleo
	Report	Agritis 40', 50'

Grigoris Lambrakis Stadium, Kallithea
Referee: Michalis Germanakos (Athens)

9 November 2005
15:30 EET

Ethnikos Piraeus	1–1 (a.e.t.)	Kallithea
Venetis 79' (o.g.)	Report	Lazanas 68'
Penalties
	4–2

Hellinikon Stadium, Elliniko
Referee: Charalampos Karatzas (Euboea)

9 November 2005
15:30 EET

Asteras Tripolis	0–0 (a.e.t.)	Apollon Kalamarias
	Report
Penalties
	2–3

Asteras Tripolis Stadium, Tripoli
Referee: Iraklis Tsikinis (Messinia)

10 November 2005
16:00 EET

Panachaiki 2005	1–1 (a.e.t.)	Iraklis
Cobelli 46'	Report	Murati 80'
Penalties
	4–2

Kostas Davourlis Stadium, Patras
Referee: Ilias Mazarakos (Arta)

26 October 2005
19:00 EET

Niki Volos	1–1 (a.e.t.)	OFI
Anastasiadis 17'	Report	Roubakis 53'
Penalties
	3–2

Panthessaliko Stadium, Volos
Referee: Ioannis Flambouris (Athens)

26 October 2005
15:40 EET

Enosi Thraki	0–0 (a.e.t.)	Ionikos
	Report
Penalties
	4–5

Fotis Kosmas Stadium, Alexandroupolis
Referee: Dimitris Dabosis (Pieria)

26 October 2005
16:00 EET

PAS Giannina	0–3	AEK Athens
	Report	Papastathopoulos 7'; Soares 29'; Moras 41'

Zosimades Stadium, Ioannina
Attendance: 5,000
Referee: Vasilis Terovitsas (Aetoloacarnania)

27 October 2005
14:30 EET

Veria	0–2	Skoda Xanthi
	Report	Lafata 6'; Mineiro 68'

Veria Stadium, Veria
Referee: Dimitrios Kalopoulos (Thessaloniki)

9 November 2005
14:30 EET

Panthrakikos	2–2 (a.e.t.)	Akratitos
Kyriakidis 60' (pen.); Karathanasis 90+5'	Report	Sales 2' (pen.), 62'
Penalties
	5–6

Panthessaliko Stadium, Volos
Referee: Ioakim Efthymiadis (Drama)

27 October 2005
15:30 EET

Agrotikos Asteras	1–1 (a.e.t.)	PAOK
Mallous 53'	Report	Mallous 1' (o.g.)
Penalties
Tziokas (penalty scored); Bekiaris (penalty scored); Sakellaridis (penalty scored); Papadopoulos (penalty scored); Kyzeridis (penalty scored)	5–4	(penalty scored) Maladenis; (penalty scored) Christodoulopoulos; (penalty scored) Malezas; (penalty missed) Balafas; (penalty scored) Salpingidis

Agrotikos Asteras Stadium, Thessaloniki
Referee: Georgios Kaznaferis (Thessaloniki)

8 November 2005
15:30 EET

Panserraikos	0–1	AEL
	Report	Șerban 25'

Serres Municipal Stadium, Serres
Referee: Kyros Vassaras (Thessaloniki)

9 November 2005
19:00 EET

Ergotelis	1–0	Panathinaikos
Kovács 89' (pen.)	Report

Pankritio Stadium, Heraklion
Attendance: 10,930
Referee: Ioannis Tsachilidis (Piraeus)

26 October 2005
16:00 EET

Olympiacos Volos	0–2	Panionios
	Report	Nalitzis 63', 37'

Panthessaliko Stadium, Volos
Referee: Theofilos Fotiadis (Thessaloniki)

10 November 2005
19:00 EET

Paniliakos	0–4	Olympiacos
	Report	Okkas 17'; Dani 19', 44'; Đorđević 86'

Pyrgos Stadium, Pyrgos
Attendance: 1,805
Referee: Dimitris Detsis (Athens)

10 November 2005
19:00 EET

Thrasyvoulos	1–0	Atromitos
Lazarou 48'; Katsikis 51' (pen.)	Report

Fyli Municipal Stadium, Fyli
Referee: Kostas Finokaliotis (Athens)

9 November 2005
15:30 EET

Ethnikos Asteras	1–0	Levadiakos
Djebbour 55'	Report

Michalis Kritikopoulos Stadium, Kaisariani
Referee: Romanos Kontogiannidis (Xanthi)

== Round of 16 ==
The draw took place on 18 November 2005.

=== Summary ===
Team 1	Score/Agg.	Team 2	Match	Replay
AEL	2–1	Apollon Kalamarias	0–0	2–1
Thrasyvoulos	0–2	Olympiacos		
AEK Athens	2–2 (4–3 p)	Ethnikos Piraeus	1–1	1–1 (a.e.t.)
Ethnikos Asteras	2–1	Panionios		
Ionikos	1–4	Niki Volos		
Agrotikos Asteras	2–0	Ergotelis		
Skoda Xanthi	1–0	Panachaiki 2005		
Akratitos	1–1 (6–5 p)	Egaleo	0–0	1–1 (a.e.t.)

=== Matches ===
21 December 2005
19:00 EET

AEL	0–0	Apollon Kalamarias
	Report

Alcazar Stadium, Larissa
Referee: Dimitrios Styliaras (Aetoloacarnania)

20 December 2005
19:00 EET

Thrasyvoulos	0–2	Olympiacos
	Report	Dani 14'; Papathanisou 90+2' (o.g.)

Fyli Municipal Stadium, Fyli
Attendance: 1,047
Referee: Dimitris Kalopoulos (Thessaloniki)

21 December 2005
16:00 EET

AEK Athens	1–1	Ethnikos Piraeus
Soares 90+1'	Report	Da Silva 90+3'

Olympic Stadium, Marousi
Attendance: Behind closed doors
Referee: Michael Koukoulakis (Heraklion)

22 December 2005
14:30 EET

Ethnikos Asteras	2–1	Panionios
Zoundi 54'; Sialmas 89'	Report	Magdy 27'

Michalis Kritikopoulos Stadium, Kaisariani
Referee: Vasilios Skoufitsas (Athens)

22 December 2005
14:30 EET

Ionikos	1–4	Niki Volos
Tsimplidis 90+1'	Report	Anastasiadis 15'; Saitiotis 20', 58', 66'

Neapoli Stadium, Nikaia
Referee: Apostolos Nikolaidis (Thessaloniki)

21 December 2005
14:30 EET

Agrotikos Asteras	2–0	Ergotelis
Tsouklis 21'; Kyzeridis 36'	Report

Agrotikos Asteras Stadium, Thessaloniki
Attendance: 1,000
Referee: Giorgos Daloukas (Thessaly)

22 December 2005
16:00 EET

Skoda Xanthi	1–0	Panachaiki 2005
Labriakos 59' (pen.)	Report

Skoda Xanthi Arena, Xanthi
Referee: Giorgos Kasnaferis (Athens)

22 December 2005
19:00 EET

Akratitos	0–0	Egaleo
	Report

Yiannis Pathiakakis Stadium, Ano Liosia
Referee: Christoforos Zografos (Athens)

==== Replay ====
12 January 2006
19:00 EET

Apollon Kalamarias	1–2	AEL
Christoforidis 74'	Report	Șerban 44'; Förster 75'

Kalamaria Stadium, Thessaloniki
Referee: Thanasis Briakos (Epirus)

11 January 2006
19:00 EET

Ethnikos Piraeus	1–1 (a.e.t.)	AEK Athens
Petrov 119'	Report	Cirillo 113'
Penalties
Morales (penalty missed); Da Silva (penalty scored); Dovas (penalty scored); Petrov (penalty scored); Kouboulis (penalty missed)	3–4	(penalty scored) Katsouranis; (penalty scored) Dellas; (penalty scored) Kontis; (penalty missed) Júlio César; (penalty scored) Cirillo

Georgios Kamaras Stadium, Rizoupoli
Attendance: 3,000
Referee: Anastasios Kakos (Corfu)

17 January 2006
19:00 EET

Egaleo	1–1 (a.e.t.)	Akratitos
Manousakis 20'	Report	Omo 90+1' (o.g.)
Penalties
Tsatsos (penalty scored); Cesarec (penalty scored); Popov (penalty missed); Skopelitis (penalty scored); Chloros (penalty scored); Chonos (penalty missed)	5–6	(penalty scored) Bantas; (penalty scored) Marinescu; (penalty missed) Pipinis; (penalty scored) de Francesco; (penalty scored) Sales; (penalty scored) Dieng

Stavros Mavrothalassitis Stadium, Aigaleo
Referee: Michalis Germanakos (Athens)

== Quarter-finals ==
The draw took place on 18 November 2005, after the Round of 16 draw.

=== Summary ===
Team 1	Agg.	Team 2	1st leg	2nd leg
Niki Volos	0–2	AEK Athens	0–0	0–2
Olympiacos	2–1	Skoda Xanthi	1–1	1–0
Ethnikos Asteras	1–5	Agrotikos Asteras	1–1	0–4
AEL	2–0	Akratitos	1–0	1–0

=== Matches ===
8 February 2006
19:00 EET

Niki Volos	0–0	AEK Athens
	Report

Panthessaliko Stadium, Volos
Attendance: 3,000
Referee: Lazaros Polatian (Pella)
22 February 2006
19:30 EET

AEK Athens	2–0	Niki Volos
Liberopoulos 26'; Katsouranis 68' (pen.)	Report

Olympic Stadium, Marousi
Attendance: 4,629
Referee: Vasilis Terovitsas (Aetoloacarnania)

AEK Athens won 2–0 on aggregate.

2 February 2006
16:00 EET

Olympiacos	1–1	Skoda Xanthi
Rivaldo 20'	Report	Lambriakos 86'

Karaiskakis Stadium, Piraeus
Referee: Iraklis Tsikinis (Messinia)
9 February 2006
16:00 EET

Skoda Xanthi	0–1	Olympiacos
	Report	Rivaldo 75'

Skoda Xanthi Arena, Xanthi
Referee: Giorgos Kasnaferis (Athens)

Olympiacos won 2–1 on aggregate.

1 February 2006
14:45 EET

Ethnikos Asteras	1–1	Agrotikos Asteras
Vela Junior 12'	Report	Kyzeridis 73'

Michalis Kritikopoulos Stadium, Kaisariani
Referee: Giorgos Daloukas (Thessaly)
8 February 2006
14:45 EET

Agrotikos Asteras	4–0	Ethnikos Asteras
Kalliakis 35'; Iordanidis 67', 75'; Bekiaris 90' (pen.)	Report

Agrotikos Asteras Stadium, Thessaloniki
Referee: Avraam Emvraizoglou (Epirus)

Agrotikos Asteras won 5–1 on aggregate.

31 January 2006
17:00 EET

AEL	1–0	Akratitos
Vela Junior 12'	Report

Alkazar Stadium, Larissa
Referee: Vasilis Paboridis (Kilkis)
8 February 2006
17:00 EET

Akratitos	0–1	AEL
	Report	Dabizas 37'

Yiannis Pathiakakis Stadium, Ano Liosia
Referee: Thanasis Briakos (Epirus)

AEL won 2–0 on aggregate.

== Semi-finals ==
The draw took place on 18 November 2005, after the quarter-final draw.

=== Summary ===
Team 1	Agg.	Team 2	1st leg	2nd leg
AEK Athens	3–1	Agrotikos Asteras	3–0	0–1
Olympiacos	4–1	AEL	3–1	1–0

=== Matches ===
21 March 2006
19:00 EET

AEK Athens	3–0	Agrotikos Asteras
Liberopoulos 59'; Moras 80'; Sapanis 85'	Report

Olympic Stadium, Marousi
Attendance: 4,102
Referee: Romanos Kontogiannidis (Xanthi)
12 April 2006
16:00 EEST

Agrotikos Asteras	1–0	AEK Athens
Tsouklis 90'	Report

Agrotikos Asteras Stadium, Thessaloniki
Attendance: 5,000
Referee: Lazaros Polatian (Pella)

AEK Athens won 3–1 on aggregate.

22 March 2006
18:45 EET

Olympiacos	3–1	AEL
Konstantinou 31', 80'; Stoltidis 42'	Report	Aloneftis 72'

Karaiskakis Stadium, Piraeus
Referee: Christoforos Zografos (Athens)
12 April 2006
19:00 EEST

AEL	0–1	Olympiacos
	Report	Castillo 90+4'

Alkazar Stadium, Larissa
Referee: Kyros Vassaras (Thessaloniki)

Olympiacos won 4–1 on aggregate.

== Final ==
10 May 2006
20:30 EEST

Olympiacos	3–0	AEK Athens
Konstantinou 61'; Ivić 70' (o.g.); Castillo 90'	Report

Pankritio Stadium, Heraklion
Attendance: 22,079
Referee: Vasilis Terovitsas (Aetoloacarnania)

== Top scorers ==
Rank	Player	Club	Goals
1	(Greece) Panagiotis Bekiaris	Agrotikos Asteras	6
2	(Greece) Georgios Saitiotis	Niki Volos	4
3	(Greece) Vangelis Kaounos	PAS Giannina	3
3	(Greece) Georgios Papandreou	Enosi Thraki	3
3	(Greece) Georgios Alexandropoulos	Thyella Patras	3
3	(Cyprus) Michalis Konstantinou	Olympiacos	3
3	(Greece) Stathis Karamalikis	Ethnikos Piraeus	3
3	(Spain) Dani García	Olympiacos	3
3	(Greece) Nikos Kyzeridis	Agrotikos Asteras	3
