= 2003–04 Greek Football Cup =

2003–04 Greek Cup
Vodafone Greek Cup

Tournament details
- Country: Greece
- Teams: 52

Final positions
- Champions: Panathinaikos (16th title)
- Runners-up: Olympiacos

Tournament statistics
- Matches played: 101
- Goals scored: 259 (2.56 per match)
- Top goal scorer(s): Andreas Niniadis (5 goals)

The 2003–04 Greek Football Cup was the 62nd edition of the Greek Football Cup. That season's edition was entitled "Vodafone Greek Cup" for sponsorship reasons.

== Calendar ==
Round	Date(s)	Fixtures	Clubs	New entries
First Round	17 August, 2 September 2003	52	52 → 26	52
Second Round	17 September, 29 October 2003	20	26 → 16	none
Round of 16	7, 14 January 2004	16	16 → 8	none
Quarter-finals	4, 17 March 2004	8	8 → 4	none
Semi-finals	27 March, 7 April 2004	4	4 → 2	none
Final	8 May 2004	1	2 → 1	none

== Knockout phase ==
Each tie in the knockout phase, apart from the final, was played over two legs, with each team playing one leg at home. The team that scored more goals on aggregate over the two legs advanced to the next round. If the aggregate score was level, the away goals rule was applied, i.e. the team that scored more goals away from home over the two legs advanced. If away goals were also equal, then extra time was played. The away goals rule was again applied after extra time, i.e. if there were goals scored during extra time and the aggregate score was still level, the visiting team advanced by virtue of more away goals scored. If no goals were scored during extra time, the winners were decided by a penalty shoot-out. In the final, which were played as a single match, if the score was level at the end of normal time, extra time was played, followed by a penalty shoot-out if the score was still level.
The mechanism of the draws for each round is as follows:

- There are no seedings, and teams from the same group can be drawn against each other.

== First round ==
The draw took place on 24 July 2003.

=== Summary ===
Team 1	Agg.	Team 2	1st leg	2nd leg
Kallithea	2–3	Levadiakos	1–1	1–2
Leonidio	0–5	Chalkidona	0–4	0–1
Pontiakos Nea Santa	0–9	Iraklis	0–4	0–5
Poseidon Neon Poron	1–4	Panionios	0–1	1–3
Panachaiki	1–3	Acharnaikos	1–0	0–3 (a.e.t.)
Paniliakos	5–6	Ergotelis	3–3	2–3
Panathinaikos	3–1	Niki Volos	2–0	1–1
Veria	1–6	Kerkyra	1–1	0–5
Thrasyvoulos	0–3	Skoda Xanthi	0–2	0–1
Thyella Patras	4–3	PAS Giannina	0–2	4–1
PAOK	4–1	AEL	1–1	3–0
Agrotikos Asteras	6–2	Ionikos	3–1	3–1
Olympiacos	6–1	Vyzas Megara	2–0	4–1
Panserraikos	2–2 (a)	Kastoria	1–2	1–0
Kalamata	3–1	Chalkida	2–1	1–0
Doxa Drama	0–7	AEK Athens	0–4	0–3
Egaleo	4–2	Ilisiakos	4–0	0–2
Apollon Athens	6–0	Kavala	3–0	3–0
Patraikos	4–3	Apollon Kalamarias	1–1	3–2 (a.e.t.)
ILTEX Lykoi	4–1	Fostiras	2–1	2–0
Ethnikos Asteras	1–0	Agios Dimitrios	1–0	0–0
Marko	2–3	Aris	2–2	0–1
Atsalenios	1–8	Akratitos	1–1	0–7
Proodeftiki	7–3	Kassandra	6–1	1–2
OFI	2–0	Rodos	1–0	1–0
Kilkisiakos	3–7	Atromitos	1–4	2–3

=== Matches ===
10 August 2003
13:00 EEST

Kallithea	1–1	Levadiakos
Gekas 54'	Report (page 1)	Zouboulis 77'

Grigoris Lamprakis Stadium, Kallithea
Referee: Giorgos Douros (Corinthia)
4 September 2003
13:00 EEST

Levadiakos	2–1	Kallithea
Zouboulis 53'; Galamelos 57'	Report (page 1)	Gekas 89'

Levadia Municipal Stadium, Livadeia
Referee: Thanasis Briakos (Epirus)

Levadiakos won 3–2 on aggregate.

13 August 2003
13:00 EEST

Leonidio	0–4	Chalkidona
	Report (page 1)	Zacharopoulos 11', 55'; Geladaris 19', 62'

Leonidio Municipal Stadium, Leonidio
Referee: Iraklis Tsikinis (Messinia)
3 September 2003
13:00 EEST

Chalkidona	1–0	Leonidio
Nioplias 40'	Report (page 1)

Pantelis Nikolaidis Stadium, Nikaia
Referee: Gerasimos Mazarakis (Kefalonia)

Chalkidona won 5–0 on aggregate.

7 September 2003
13:00 EEST

Pontiakos Nea Santa	0–4	Iraklis
	Report (page 1-2)	Fofonka 3', 10'; Poursanidis 50'; Kiassos 69'

Municipal Stadium of Kilkis, Kilkis
Referee: Giannis Kaminaris (Thessaly)
10 September 2003
13:00 EEST

Iraklis	5–0	Pontiakos Nea Santa
Bachramis 18'; P. Kapetanos 30'; K. Kapetanos 43', 45'; Xenidis 70'	Report (page 2)

Kaftanzoglio Stadium, Thessaloniki
Referee: Dimitris Dabosis (Pieria)

Iraklis won 9–0 on aggregate.

12 August 2003
13:00 EEST

Poseidon Neon Poron	0–1	Panionios
	Report (page 2)	Parodi 20'

Neoi Poroi Stadium, Neoi Poroi
Referee: Dimitris Kalopoulos (Thessaloniki)
4 September 2003
13:00 EEST

Panionios	3–1	Poseidon Neon Poron
Pino 33'; Giuliano 71'; Tsimopoulos 81' (o.g.)	Report (page 2)	Georgiev 54'

Nea Smyrni Stadium, Nea Smyrni
Referee: Charalampos Karatzas (Euboea)

Panionios won 4–1 on aggregate.

11 August 2003
13:00 EEST

Panachaiki	1–0	Acharnaikos
Bertsias 80'	Report (page 2)

Kostas Davourlis Stadium, Patras
Referee: Spyros Vasiliou (Elis)
17 August 2003
13:00 EEST

Acharnaikos	3–0 (a.e.t.)	Panachaiki
Rousopoulos 39'; Kosmas 98'; Lampropoulos 110'	Report (page 2)

Acharnes Stadium, Acharnes
Referee: Theodoros Triantafyllidis (Piraeus)

Acharnaikos won 3–1 on aggregate.

13 August 2003
13:00 EEST

Paniliakos	3–3	Ergotelis
Marcora 29'; Vyntra 64', 90'	Report (page 3)	Tzanetis 74'; Dimitris 80'; Andriadakis 82'

Pyrgos Stadium, Pyrgos
Referee: Gerasimos Mazarakis (Kefalonia)
20 August 2003
13:00 EEST

Ergotelis	3–2	Paniliakos
Lamprakis 25'; Tzanetis 75'; Ogunsoto 80'	Report (page 3)	Spyropoulos 15'; Manikas 89'

Pankritio Stadium, Heraklion
Referee: Makis Germanakos (Athens)

Ergotelis won 6–5 on aggregate.

16 August 2003
13:00 EEST

Panathinaikos	2–0	Niki Volos
Papadopoulos 22' (pen.); Goumas 75'	Report (page 3)

Athens Olympic Stadium, Marousi
Referee: Nikos Koulias (Thesprotia)
27 August 2003
13:00 EEST

Niki Volos	1–1	Panathinaikos
Goumas 71'	Report (page 3)	Marić 74'

Pantelis Magoulas Stadium, Volos
Referee: Dimitris Dabosis (Pieria)

Panathinaikos won 3–1 on aggregate.

10 August 2003
13:00 EEST

Veria	1–1	Kerkyra
Kafes 12' (pen.)	Report (page 3)	Providas 38'

Veria Stadium, Veria
Referee: Symeon Tsesmetzis (Serres)
17 August 2003
13:00 EEST

Kerkyra	5–0	Veria
Touré 9'; Papapostolou 25'; Koltzos 37'; Bellaj 43'; Providas 61'	Report (page 3)

Kerkyra Stadium, Corfu
Referee: Nikos Athanasiou (Thesprotia)

Kerkyra won 6–0 on aggregate.

13 August 2003
13:00 EEST

Thyella Patras	0–2	PAS Giannina
	Report (page 3-4)	Gošev 31' (pen.); Dasios 88'

Fotis Aravantinos Stadium, Patras
Referee: Kostas Florakis (Phocis)
3 September 2003
13:00 EEST

PAS Giannina	1–4	Thyella Patras
Chatzipantelidis 16'	Report (page 4)	Alexandropoulos 9', 72'; Tsangaris 58', 63'

Zosimades Stadium, Ioannina
Referee: Anastasios Kakos (Corfu)

Thyella Patras won 6–1 on aggregate.

9 August 2003
13:00 EEST

Thrasyvoulos	0–2	Skoda Xanthi
	Report (page 4)	Pérez 40', 70' (pen.)

Fyli Municipal Stadium, Fyli
Referee: Giannis Tsacheilidis (Piraeus)
3 September 2003
13:00 EEST

Skoda Xanthi	1–0	Thrasyvoulos
Baykara 10'	Report (page 4)

Skoda Xanthi Arena, Xanthi
Referee: Manolis Tapatzas (Thrace)

Skoda Xanthi won 3–0 on aggregate.

9 August 2003
13:00 EEST

PAOK	1–1	AEL
Yiasoumi 9'	Report (page 4)	Tsakmakidis 41'

Toumba Stadium, Thessaloniki
Referee: Dimitris Dabosis (Pieria)
19 August 2003
13:00 EEST

AEL	0–3	PAOK
	Report (page 4-5)	Hagan 13'; Spasić 41'; Yiasoumi 70'

Kozani Stadium, Kozani
Referee: Makis Efthimiadis (Drama)

PAOK won 4–1 on aggregate.

11 August 2003
13:00 EEST

Agrotikos Asteras	3–1	Ionikos
Beniskos 68', 70'; Telliadis 89'	Report (page 5)	Simone 81'

Agrotikos Asteras Stadium, Thessaloniki
Referee: Efthimios Damianos (Kozani)
3 September 2003
13:00 EEST

Ionikos	1–3	Agrotikos Asteras
Frousos 9'	Report (page 5)	Beniskos 59'; Bekiaris 76'; Tsatsos 87'

Neapolis Municipal Stadium, Nikaia
Referee: Nikos Koulias (Thesprotia)

Agrotikos Asteras won 6–2 on aggregate.

13 August 2003
13:00 EEST

Olympiacos	2–0	Vyzas Megara
Georgiadis 6', 38' (pen.)	Report (page 5)

Georgios Kamaras Stadium, Rizoupoli
Referee: Vasilis Terovitsas (Aetoloacarnania)
3 September 2003
13:00 EEST

Vyzas Megara	1–4	Olympiacos
Kalykas 83'	Report (page 5)	Castillo 27'; Stoltidis 47'; Tatsis 55'; Niniadis 60'

Megara Stadium, Megara
Referee: Giorgos Borovilos (Arcadia)

Olympiacos won 6–1 on aggregate.

10 August 2003
13:00 EEST

Panserraikos	1–2	Kastoria
Arabatzis 84'	Report (page 5)	Kapetanopoulos 42'; Soultanidis 43'

Serres Municipal Stadium, Serres
Referee: Theodoros Gaitatzis (Drama)
17 August 2003
13:00 EEST

Kastoria	0–1	Panserraikos
	Report (page 5-6)	Gaidatzis 26'

Municipal Stadium of Kastoria, Kastoria
Referee: A. Evangelou (Karditsa)

Kastoria won on away goals.

3 September 2003
13:00 EEST

Kalamata	2–1	Chalkida
Trichias 10', 49'	Report (page 6)	Giaginis 90' (pen.)

Kalamata Municipal Stadium, Kalamata
Referee: Antonis Blathras (Elis)
7 September 2003
13:00 EEST

Chalkida	0–1	Kalamata
	Report (page 6)	Goundoulakis 75'

Municipal Stadium of Chalkida, Chalcis
Referee: Giorgos Giannopoulos (Athens)

Kalamata won 3–1 on aggregate.

17 August 2003
17:30 EEST (UTC+3)

Doxa Drama	0–4	AEK Athens
	Report (page 6)	Rusev 11'; Okkas 42', 89', 90'

Doxa Drama Stadium, Drama
Attendance: 5,684
Referee: Manolis Tapatzas (Thrace)
2 September 2003
21:00 EEST

AEK Athens	3–0	Doxa Drama
Rusev 50'; Konstantinidis 57' (pen.); Kostis 70'	Report (page 6)

Nea Smyrni Stadium, Nea Smyrni
Attendance: 388
Referee: Stavros Georgopoulos (Arcadia)

AEK Athens won 7–0 on aggregate.

13 August 2003
13:00 EEST

Egaleo	4–0	Ilisiakos
Fotakis 31'; Alexopoulos 51'; Agritis 64'; Edusei 72'	Report (page 6)

Stavros Mavrothalassitis Stadium, Aigaleo
Referee: Avraam Kemparidis (Thessaloniki)
3 September 2003
13:00 EEST

Ilisiakos	2–0	Egaleo
Pargianos 68'; Medan 71'	Report (page 6-7)

Grigoris Lambrakis Stadium, Kallithea
Referee: Giannis Tsachilidis (Piraeus)

Egaleo won 4–2 on aggregate.

9 August 2003
13:00 EEST

Apollon Athens	3–0	Kavala
Stratis 27'; Titis 58' (o.g.); Karademitros 90'	Report (page 7)

Georgios Kamaras Stadium, Rizoupoli
Referee: Antonia Kokotou (Argolida)
17 August 2003
13:00 EEST

Kavala	0–3	Apollon Athens
	Report (page 7)	Stratis 21'; Basinas 38'; Anastasakos 65'

Anthi Karagianni Stadium, Kavala
Referee: Giorgos Ouzounidis (Evros)

Apollon Athens won 6–0 on aggregate.

12 August 2003
13:00 EEST

Patraikos	1–1	Apollon Kalamarias
Androutsos 90+2'	Report (page 7)	Vela 30'

Prosfygika Stadium, Patras
Referee: Dimitrios Styliaras (Aetoloacarnania)
3 September 2003
13:00 EEST

Apollon Kalamarias	2–3 (a.e.t.)	Patraikos
Siafos 79', 108'	Report (page 7)	Šuhaj 13'; Gebro 100'; Strantzalis 103'

Kalamaria Stadium, Thessaloniki
Referee: Lazaros Polatian (Pella)

Patraikos won 4–3 on aggregate.

10 August 2003
13:00 EEST

ILTEX Lykoi	2–1	Fostiras
Kalogiros 23', 57'	Report (page 7-8)	Bagayoko 39'

Stelios Iliadis Stadium, Thessaloniki
Referee: Evangelos Tselios (Chalkidiki)
27 August 2003
13:00 EEST

Fostiras	0–2	ILTEX Lykoi
	Report (page 8)	Georgiadis 55'; Dimitriadis 67'

Tavros Stadium, Tavros
Referee: Michael Koukoulakis (Heraklion)

ILTEX Lykoi won 4–1 on aggregate.

11 August 2003
13:00 EEST

Ethnikos Asteras	1–0	Agios Dimitrios
Kolliakos 55'	Report (page 8)

Michalis Kritikopoulos Stadium, Kaisariani
Referee: Konstantinos Papastamatis (Athens)
3 September 2003
13:00 EEST

Agios Dimitrios	0–0	Ethnikos Asteras
	Report (page 8)

Agios Dimitrios Municipal Stadium, Agios Dimitrios
Referee: Giannis Papastamatis (Athens)

Ethnikos Asteras won 1–0 on aggregate.

10 August 2003
13:00 EEST

Marko	2–2	Aris
Koltsidas 20' (o.g.); Angos 67'	Report (page 8)	Kyzeridis 17'; Ampelas 26'

Municipal Stadium of Markopoulo, Markopoulo
Referee: Charalampos Karatzas (Euboea)
18 August 2003
13:00 EEST

Aris	1–0	Marko
Papadopoulos 44' (pen.)	Report (page 8)

Aris Stadium, Thessaloniki
Referee: Giorgos Takidis (Kilkis)

Aris won 3–2 on aggregate.

3 September 2003
13:00 EEST

Atsalenios	1–1	Akratitos
Kalogiannakis 40'	Report (page 8-9)	Lincar 88'

Atsalenios Stadium, Heraklion
Referee: Giannis Spyropoulos (Phthiotis)
7 September 2003
13:00 EEST

Akratitos	7–0	Atsalenios
Venetis 46'; Iordanidis 51', 87'; Iliopoulos 60' (pen.), 65'; Damigos 74'; Gitsis 79'	Report (page 9)

Giannis Pathiakakis Stadium, Ano Liosia
Referee: Vasilis Terovitsas (Aetoloacarnania)

Akratitos won 8–1 on aggregate.

12 August 2003
13:00 EEST

Proodeftiki	6–1	Kassandra
Vilanakis 3', 78', 90'; Zajmi 26'; Chaniotis 43'; Andralas 52'	Report (page 9)	Athanasiadis 82'

Nikaia Municipal Stadium, Nikaia
Referee: Giannis Spyropoulos (Phthiotis)
27 August 2003
13:00 EEST

Kassandra	2–1	Proodeftiki
Sakellaridis 27', 71'	Report (page 9)	Zajmi 89'

Municipal Stadium of Kassandreia, Kassandreia
Referee: Dimitris Kalopoulos (Thessaloniki)

Proodeftiki won 7–3 on aggregate.

12 August 2003
13:00 EEST

OFI	1–0	Rodos
Solís 53' (pen.)	Report (page 9)

Theodoros Vardinogiannis Stadium, Heraklion
Referee: Kostas Finokaliotis (Athens)
17 August 2003
13:00 EEST

Rodos	0–1	OFI
	Report (page 9)	Soares 67'

Diagoras Stadium, Rhodes
Referee: Frangiskos Somarakakis (Athens)

OFI won 2–0 on aggregate.

9 August 2003
13:00 EEST

Kilkisiakos	1–4	Atromitos
Angelis 24'	Report (page 10)	Gavrilopoulos 14', 90'; Biro-Biro 20'; Bougatsias 45'

Municipal Stadium of Kilkis, Kilkis
Referee: Georgios Zolotas (Thessaly)
3 September 2003
13:00 EEST

Atromitos	3–2	Kilkisiakos
Kakaras 18'; Gavrilopoulos 70'; Giannopoulos 85'	Report (page 10)	Giannoulidis 55'; M. Platakis 74'

Peristeri Stadium, Peristeri
Referee: Kostas Zanetidis (Dodecanese)

Atromitos won 7–3 on aggregate.

== Bracket ==
Second round
Patraikos (bye)
Chalkidona	2	0	2
Ethnikos Asteras	0	1	1
Panathinaikos (bye)
ILTEX Lykoi	0	0	0
OFI	1	2	3
Acharnaikos	1	1	2
Agrotikos Asteras (a)	2	0	2
AEK Athens (bye)
Iraklis	2	3	5
Thyella Patras	1	2	3
Aris	1	3	4
Levadiakos	1	1	2
Proodeftiki (bye)
Kerkyra	1	0	1
Akratitos	0	2	2
Egaleo	1	0	1
PAOK	1	1	2
Kastoria (bye)
Olympiacos	3	3	6
Ergotelis	2	1	3
Atromitos	0	0	0
Skoda Xanthi	3	2	5
Kalamata (bye)
Panionios	2	0	2
Apollon Athens	1	0	1

Round of 16
Patraikos (a)	1	1	2
Chalkidona	0	2	2
Panathinaikos	1	1	2
OFI	0	1	1
Agrotikos Asteras	0	2	2
AEK Athens	2	2	4
Iraklis	0	2	2
Aris	0	0	0
Proodeftiki (a)	0	2	2
Akratitos	1	1	2
PAOK	0	1	1
Kastoria	1	1	2
Olympiacos	1	2	3
Skoda Xanthi	0	0	0
Kalamata	0	0	0
Panionios	0	4	4

Quarter-finals
Patraikos	0	1	1
Panathinaikos	1	2	3
AEK Athens	1	3	4
Iraklis	0	2	2
Proodeftiki	0	1	1(3)
Kastoria (p)	1	0	1(4)
Olympiacos	1	0	1
Panionios	0	0	0

Semi-finals
Panathinaikos	2	1	3
AEK Athens	2	0	2
Kastoria	0	1	1
Olympiacos	3	1	4

Final
Panathinaikos	3
Olympiacos	1

== Second round ==
=== Summary ===
Team 1	Agg.	Team 2	1st leg	2nd leg
Chalkidona	2–1	Ethnikos Asteras	2–0	0–1
Kerkyra	1–2	Akratitos	1–0	0–2
Egaleo	1–2	PAOK	1–1	0–1
ILTEX Lykoi	0–3	OFI	0–1	0–2
Acharnaikos	2–2 (a)	Agrotikos Asteras	1–2	1–0
Iraklis	5–3	Thyella Patras	2–1	3–2
Atromitos	0–5	Skoda Xanthi	0–3	0–2
Panionios	2–1	Apollon Athens	2–1	0–0
Aris	4–2	Levadiakos	3–1	1–1
Olympiacos	6–3	Ergotelis	3–2	3–1
Proodeftiki	bye			
Panathinaikos	bye			
Kalamata	bye			
Patraikos	bye			
AEK Athens	bye			
Kastoria	bye			

=== Matches ===
10 September 2003
17:00 EEST

Chalkidona	2–0	Ethnikos Asteras
Korakakis 37'; Makris 65'	Report (page 10)

Pantelis Nikolaidis Stadium, Nikaia
Referee: Giorgos Borovilos (Arcadia)
1 October 2003
17:00 EEST

Ethnikos Asteras	1–0	Chalkidona
Taxiarchis 60' (pen.)	Report (page 10)

Michalis Kritikopoulos Stadium, Kaisariani
Referee: Charalampos Karatzas (Euboea)

Chalkidona won 2–1 on aggregate.

24 September 2003
17:00 EEST

Kerkyra	1–0	Akratitos
Papapostolou 85'	Report (page 10)

Kerkyra Stadium, Corfu
Referee: Thanasis Briakos (Epirus)
29 October 2003
17:00 EET

Akratitos	2–0	Kerkyra
Ziakas 8'; Gitsis 89'	Report (page 10-11)

Giannis Pathiakakis Stadium, Ano Liosia
Referee: Stavros Georgopoulos (Arcadia)

Akratitos won 2–1 on aggregate.

17 September 2003
16:45 EEST

Egaleo	1–1	PAOK
Agritis 8'	Report (page 11)	Salpingidis 80'

Stavros Mavrothalassitis Stadium, Aigaleo
Referee: Giannis Spyropoulos (Phthiotis)
29 October 2003
19:00 EET

PAOK	1–0	Egaleo
Salpingidis 14'	Report (page 11)

Toumba Stadium, Thessaloniki
Referee: Giorgos Takidis (Kilkis)

PAOK won 2–1 on aggregate.

24 September 2003
15:00 EEST

ILTEX Lykoi	0–1	OFI
	Report (page 11)	Belevonis 86'

Stelios Iliadis Stadium, Thessaloniki
Referee: Dimitris Dabosis (Pieria)
8 October 2003
17:00 EEST

OFI	2–0	ILTEX Lykoi
Soares 26'; Triantafyllou 90+2'	Report (page 11)

Theodoros Vardinogiannis Stadium, Heraklion
Referee: Stavros Georgopoulos (Arcadia)

OFI won 3–0 on aggregate.

17 September 2003
17:00 EEST

Acharnaikos	1–2	Agrotikos Asteras
Pararas 33'	Report (page 11)	Naidos 19'; Velonis 90'

Acharnes Stadium, Acharnes
Referee: Christos Apostolidis (Piraeus)
1 October 2003
17:00 EEST

Agrotikos Asteras	0–1	Acharnaikos
	Report (page 11-12)	Mostratos 80'

Agrotikos Asteras Stadium, Thessaloniki
Referee: I. Athanasiadis (Chalkidiki)

Agrotikos Asteras won on away goals.

1 October 2003
17:00 EEST

Iraklis	2–1	Thyella Patras
Mięciel 27' (pen.); Kapetanos 44'	Report (page 12)	Konstantinidis 14'

Kaftanzoglio Stadium, Thessaloniki
Referee: Frangiskos Somarakakis (Athens)
8 October 2003
15:00 EEST

Thyella Patras	2–3	Iraklis
Tsangaris 10', 20'	Report (page 12)	Fofonka 7'; Machlas 71' (pen.), 72'

Fotis Aravantinos Stadium, Patras
Referee: Makis Germanakos (Athens)

Iraklis won 5–3 on aggregate.

9 September 2003
17:00 EEST

Atromitos	0–3	Skoda Xanthi
	Report (page 12)	Labriakos 32'; Drobňák 39'; Friesenbichler 87'

Attendance: Peristeri
Referee: Gerasimos Mazarakis (Kefalonia)
29 October 2003
15:00 EET

Skoda Xanthi	2–0	Atromitos
Vasiliadis 41'; Daoutis 45'	Report (page 12)

Skoda Xanthi Arena, Xanthi
Referee: Manolis Tapatzas (Thrace)

Skoda Xanthi won 5–0 on aggregate.

9 September 2003
19:00 EEST

Panionios	2–1	Apollon Athens
Kontis 42', 90'	Report (page 12)	Anastasakos 19'

Nea Smyrni Stadium, Nea Smyrni
Referee: Giorgos Kasnaferis (Athens)
8 October 2003
20:30 EEST

Apollon Athens	0–0	Panionios
	Report (page 13)

Georgios Kamaras Stadium, Rizoupoli
Referee: Makis Efthimiadis (Drama)

Panionios won 2–1 on aggregate.

10 September 2003
19:00 EEST

Aris	3–1	Levadiakos
Lazanas 8', 36'; N. Papadopoulos 73'	Report (page 13)	Koça 83'

Aris Stadium, Thessaloniki
Referee: Efthimios Damianos (Kozani)
8 October 2003
15:00 EEST

Levadiakos	1–1	Aris
Koça 85'	Report (page 13)	Lazanas 70'

Levadia Municipal Stadium, Livadeia
Attendance: 470
Referee: Nikos Koulias (Thesprotia)

Aris won 4–2 on aggregate.

9 September 2003
17:00 EEST

Olympiacos	3–2	Ergotelis
Niniadis 16'; Stoltidis 44', 88'	Report (page 13)	Sylla 21'; Ogunsoto 52'

Levadia Municipal Stadium, Livadeia
Referee: Christoforos Zografos (Athens)
29 October 2003
15:00 EET

Ergotelis	1–3	Olympiacos
Ogunsoto 65'	Report (page 13)	Niniadis 30', 64'; Kafes 52'

Pankritio Stadium, Heraklion
Referee: Kostas Finokaliotis (Athens)

Olympiacos won 6–3 on aggregate.

== Round of 16 ==
=== Summary ===
Team 1	Agg.	Team 2	1st leg	2nd leg
Proodeftiki	(a) 2–2	Akratitos	0–1	2–1 (a.e.t.)
Panathinaikos	2–1	OFI	1–0	1–1
Iraklis	2–0	Aris	0–0	2–0
Kalamata	0–4	Panionios	0–0	0–4
Patraikos	(a) 2–2	Chalkidona	1–0	1–2
Agrotikos Asteras	2–4	AEK Athens	0–2	2–2
Olympiacos	3–0	Skoda Xanthi	1–0	2–0
PAOK	1–2	Kastoria	0–1	1–1

=== Matches ===
3 December 2003
19:00 EET

Proodeftiki	0–1	Akratitos
	Report (page 13-14)	Gitsis 56'

Nikaia Municipal Stadium, Nikaia
Referee: Iraklis Tsikinis (Messinia)
28 January 2004
20:00 EET

Akratitos	1–2 (a.e.t.)	Proodeftiki
Koutsokostas 117'	Report (page 14)	Dagounakis 30'; Andralas 115'

Giannis Pathiakakis Stadium, Ano Liosia
Referee: Giorgos Borovilos (Arcadia)

Proodeftiki won on away goals.

17 December 2003
21:15 EET

Panathinaikos	1–0	OFI
Sânmărtean 55'	Report (page 14)

Leoforos Alexandras Stadium, Ampelokipoi
Referee: Charalampos Karatzas (Euboea)
21 January 2004
14:30 EET

OFI	1–1	Panathinaikos
Bykowski 67'	Report (page 14)	Basinas 55'

Theodoros Vardinogiannis Stadium, Heraklion
Referee: Giorgos Douros (Corinthia)

Panathinaikos won 2–1 on aggregate.

17 December 2003
19:00 EET

Iraklis	0–0	Aris
	Report (page 14)

Nea Efkarpia Stadium, Thessaloniki
Referee: Giorgos Takidis (Kilkis)
21 January 2004
21:15 EET

Aris	0–2	Iraklis
	Report (page 14)	Machlas 12'; Nebegleras 19'

Aris Stadium, Thessaloniki
Referee: Kyros Vassaras (Thessaloniki)

Iraklis won 2–0 on aggregate.

17 December 2003
15:00 EET

Kalamata	0–0	Panionios
	Report (page 14-15)

Kalamata Municipal Stadium, Kalamata
Referee: Nikos Koulias (Thesprotia)
14 January 2004
17:00 EET

Panionios	4–0	Kalamata
Mitrou 6'; Pino 61'; Mantzios 81'; Nebegleras 89'	Report (page 15)

Nea Smyrni Stadium, Nea Smyrni
Referee: Dimitris Kalopoulos (Thessaloniki)

Panionios won 4–0 on aggregate.

7 January 2004
17:30 EET

Patraikos	1–0	Chalkidona
Gravanis 89'	Report (page 15)

Prosfygika Stadium, Patras
Referee: Frangiskos Somarakakis (Athens)
28 January 2004
17:00 EET

Chalkidona	2–1	Patraikos
Zacharopoulos 15' (pen.), 31'	Report (page 15)	Argyropoulos 90+1'

Pantelis Nikolaidis Stadium, Nikaia
Referee: Michael Koukoulakis (Heraklion)

Patraikos won on away goals.

7 January 2004
15:00 EET

Agrotikos Asteras	0–2	AEK Athens
	Report (page 15)	Petkov 54'; Tsiartas 90'

Agrotikos Asteras Stadium, Thessaloniki
Referee: Manolis Tapatzas (Thrace)
14 January 2004
20:00 EET

AEK Athens	2–2	Agrotikos Asteras
Katsouranis 27'; Liberopoulos 90+2'	Report (page 15)	Karatziotis 17'; Bekiaris 41'

Giannis Pathiakakis Stadium, Ano Liosia
Referee: Antonis Kouklakis (Chania)

AEK Athens won 4–2 on aggregate.

7 January 2004
20:00 EET

Olympiacos	1–0	Skoda Xanthi
Georgatos 11'	Report (page 15-16)

Georgios Kamaras Stadium, Rizoupoli
Attendance: 3,882
Referee: Giannis Kaminaris (Thessaly)
21 January 2004
17:00 EET

Skoda Xanthi	0–2	Olympiacos
	Report (page 16)	Giovanni 52'; Castillo 62' (pen.)

Skoda Xanthi Arena, Xanthi
Attendance: 1,702
Referee: Giorgos Kasnaferis (Argolida)

Olympiacos won 3–0 on aggregate.

7 January 2004
17:00 EET

PAOK	0–1	Kastoria
	Report (page 16)	Kapetanopoulos 23' (pen.)

Toumba Stadium, Thessaloniki
Referee: Dimitris Dabosis (Pieria)
14 January 2004
14:30 EET

Kastoria	1–1	PAOK
Panteliadis 62'	Report (page 16)	Yiasoumi 41'

Municipal Stadium of Kastoria, Kastoria
Referee: Efthimios Damianos (Kozani)

Kastoria won 2–1 on aggregate.

== Quarter-finals ==
=== Summary ===
Team 1	Agg.	Team 2	1st leg	2nd leg
Patraikos	1–3	Panathinaikos	0–1	1–2
Olympiacos	1–0	Panionios	1–0	0–0
Proodeftiki	1–1 (3–4 p)	Kastoria	0–1	1–0
AEK Athens	4–2	Iraklis	1–0	3–2

=== Matches ===
11 February 2004
18:00 EET

Patraikos	0–1	Panathinaikos
	Report (page 16)	Michaelsen 21'

Prosfygika Stadium, Patras
Referee: Nikos Koulias (Thesprotia)
17 March 2004
17:00 EET

Panathinaikos	2–1	Patraikos
Papadopoulos 20'; Sapanis 1'	Report (page 16-17)	Georgopoulos 51'

Leoforos Alexandras Stadium, Ampelokipoi
Referee: Nikos Koulias (Thesprotia)

Panathinaikos won 3–1 on aggregate.

11 February 2004
20:00 EET

Olympiacos	1–0	Panionios
Georgiadis 61' (pen.)	Report (page 17)

Georgios Kamaras Stadium, Rizoupoli
Attendance: 6,420
Referee: Giannis Spyropoulos (Phthiotis)
3 March 2004
19:00 EET

Panionios	0–0	Olympiacos
	Report (page 17)

Nea Smyrni Stadium, Nea Smyrni
Attendance: 3,550
Referee: Thanasis Briakos (Epirus)

Olympiacos won 1–0 on aggregate.

25 February 2004
19:00 EET

Proodeftiki	0–1	Kastoria
	Report (page 17)	Panteliadis 86'

Nikaia Municipal Stadium, Nikaia
Referee: Vasilis Skoufitsas (Athens)
16 March 2004
19:00 EET

Kastoria	0–1 (a.e.t.)	Proodeftiki
	Report (page 17)	Koumentakos 87'
Penalties
	4–3

Municipal Stadium of Kastoria, Kastoria
Referee: Dimitris Dabosis (Pieria)

Kastoria won 4–3 on penalties.

4 March 2004
19:00 EET

AEK Athens	1–0	Iraklis
Tsiartas 4' (pen.)	Report (page 17)

Giannis Pathiakakis Stadium, Ano Liosia
Attendance: Behind closed doors
Referee: Giannis Tsacheilidis (Piraeus)
16 March 2004
19:00 EET (UTC+2)

Iraklis	2–3	AEK Athens
Ioannou 36'; Mięciel 86'	Report (page 17-18)	Okkas 28'; Liberopoulos 64', 77'

Nea Efkarpia Stadium, Thessaloniki
Attendance: 4,594
Referee: Giorgos Douros (Corinthia)

AEK Athens won 4–2 on aggregate.

== Semi-finals ==
=== Summary ===
Team 1	Agg.	Team 2	1st leg	2nd leg
Panathinaikos	3–2	AEK Athens	2–2	1–0
Kastoria	1–4	Olympiacos	0–3	1–1

=== Matches ===
27 March 2004
20:00 EEST

Panathinaikos	2–2	AEK Athens
Basinas 29' (pen.); Olisadebe 90+2'	Report (page 18)	Katsouranis 20'; Lakis 88'

Leoforos Alexandras Stadium, Ampelokipoi
Attendance: 8,657
Referee: Thanasis Briakos (Epirus)
7 April 2004
20:00 EEST

AEK Athens	0–1	Panathinaikos
	Report (page 18)	Goumas 9'

Giannis Pathiakakis Stadium, Ano Liosia
Attendance: 5,000
Referee: Christoforos Zografos (Athens)

Panathinaikos won 3–2 on aggregate.

7 April 2004
16:00 EEST

Kastoria	0–3	Olympiacos
	Report (page 18)	Georgatos 15'; Choutos 19'; Kuźba 77'

Municipal Stadium of Kastoria, Kastoria
Attendance: 8,000
Referee: Manolis Tapatzas (Thrace)
21 April 2004
20:00 EEST

Olympiacos	1–1	Kastoria
Niniadis 73' (pen.)	Report (page 18)	Lazaridis 45'

Georgios Kamaras Stadium, Rizoupoli
Attendance: 2,147
Referee: Fragiskos Somarakakis (Athens)

Olympiacos won 4–1 on aggregate.

== Final ==
8 May 2004
21:00 EEST

Panathinaikos	3–1	Olympiacos
Papadopoulos 3'; Konstantinou 68', 80'	Report (pages 18-19)	Giovanni 65'

Nea Smyrni Stadium, Nea Smyrni
Attendance: 7,500
Referee: Giorgos Kasnaferis (Argolida)

== Top scorers ==
Rank	Player	Club	Goals
1	(Greece) Andreas Niniadis	Olympiacos	5
2	(Greece) Giorgos Zacharopoulos	Chalkidona	4
2	(Greece) Fotis Tsangaris	Thyella Patras	4
2	(Cyprus) Ioannis Okkas	Olympiacos	4
5	(Greece) Angelos Vilanakis	Proodeftiki	3
5	(Greece) Alexis Gavrilopoulos	Atromitos	3
5	(Greece) Pantelis Kapetanos	Iraklis	3
5	(Greece) Giannis Lazanas	Aris	3
5	(Nigeria) Patrick Ogunsoto	Ergotelis	3
5	(Greece) Dimitrios Papadopoulos	Panathinaikos	3
5	(Greece) Ioakim Beniskos	Agrotikos Asteras	3
5	(Greece) Nikos Machlas	Iraklis	3
5	(Greece) Panagiotis Gitsis	Akratitos	3
5	(Cyprus) Yiasoumis Yiasoumi	PAOK	3
5	(Brazil) Ederson Fofonka	Iraklis	3
5	(Greece) Nikos Liberopoulos	AEK Athens	3
5	(Greece) Georgios Georgiadis	Olympiacos	3
5	(Greece) Ieroklis Stoltidis	Olympiacos	3
