= Bagayoko =

Bagayoko is a surname. Notable people with the surname include:

- Amadou Bagayoko (born 1954), Malian guitarist and vocalist from musical duo Amadou & Mariam
- Bally Bagayoko (born 1973), French politician
- Bassala Bagayoko (born 2006), Malian basketball player
- Fatoumata Bagayoko (born 1988), Malian women's basketball player
- Malick Bowens (1941–2017; born Malick Bagayoko), French actor
- Mamadou Bagayoko (born 1979), Malian international footballer
- Mamadou Bagayoko (born 1989), Ivorian footballer
- Oumar Bagayoko (born 1975), Malian footballer
- Sekou Bagayoko (born 1987), Malian professional footballer
- Siaka Bagayoko (born 1998), Malian footballer
- Tiécoro Bagayoko (1937–1987), Former Director of the National Security Service and General Police of Mali
