= 2002–03 Gamma Ethniki =

Gamma Ethniki
- Season: 2002–03
- Champions: Poseidon Neon Poron
- Promoted: Poseidon Neon Poron; Ergotelis; Levadiakos; Niki Volos
- Relegated: Chania; Ethnikos Piraeus; Agios Nikolaos; Nafpaktiakos Asteras; Trikala

The 2002–03 Gamma Ethniki was the 20th season since the official establishment of the third tier of Greek football in 1983. Poseidon Neon Poron was crowned champion, thus winning promotion to Beta Ethniki. Ergotelis also won promotion as a runner-up, Levadiakos was also promoted after defeating Kavala 2-1 in a single play-off match at Alcazar Stadium in Larissa between the 14th placed team of Beta Ethniki and the 3rd placed team of Gamma Ethniki, and Niki Volos was administratively promoted due to the withdrawal of Ethnikos Olympiacos Volos from Beta Ethniki due to the debts.

Chania, Ethnikos Piraeus, Agios Nikolaos, Nafpaktiakos Asteras and Trikala were relegated to Delta Ethniki.

== League table ==
Location of teams in 2002–03 Gamma Ethniki

Pos	Team	Pld	W	D	L	GF	GA	GD	Pts	Promotion or relegation
1	Poseidon Neon Poron (C, P)	38	26	4	8	77	40	+37	82	Promotion to Beta Ethniki
2	Ergotelis (P)	38	25	5	8	75	29	+46	80	Promotion to Beta Ethniki
3	Levadiakos (P)	38	23	9	6	64	39	+25	78	Qualification for Promotion play-off
4	Niki Volos (Note: Niki Volos promoted to Beta Ethniki due to withdrawal of Olympiacos Volos.) (P)	38	19	10	9	40	27	+13	67	Promotion to Beta Ethniki
5	Agrotikos Asteras	38	19	5	14	56	40	+16	62	
6	Thrasyvoulos	38	16	12	10	51	29	+22	60	
7	Kilkisiakos	38	17	9	12	67	48	+19	60	
8	Agios Dimitrios	38	15	12	11	49	39	+10	57	
9	Acharnaikos	38	16	9	13	45	44	+1	57	
10	Marko	38	16	8	14	44	40	+4	56	
11	Leonidio	38	14	13	11	37	32	+5	55	
12	ILTEX Lykoi	38	14	11	13	43	42	+1	53	
13	Kastoria	38	12	12	14	38	42	−4	48	
14	Vyzas	38	13	7	18	35	39	−4	46	
15	AEL (Note: AEL had 3 points deducted.)	38	11	13	14	33	40	−7	43	
16	Chania (R)	38	11	6	21	33	66	−33	39	Relegation to Delta Ethniki
17	Ethnikos Piraeus (R)	38	10	9	19	31	51	−20	39	Relegation to Delta Ethniki
18	Agios Nikolaos (R)	38	9	10	19	30	37	−7	37	Relegation to Delta Ethniki
19	Nafpaktiakos Asteras (R)	38	2	6	30	22	105	−83	12	Relegation to Delta Ethniki
20	Trikala (Note: Trikala excluded after round 26. The team was also deducted 19 points and the remaining matches were awarded 3–0 for opponents.) (R)	38	5	4	29	22	70	−48	0	Relegation to Delta Ethniki

(C) Champions; (P) Promoted; (R) Relegated

== Results ==
Home \ Away	ACH	AEL	AGD	AGN	AGR	CHA	ETH	ERG	LYK	KAS	KIL	LEO	LEV	MAR	NAP	NVL	POS	THR	TRI	VYZ
Acharnaikos		1–0	0–0	1–0	2–0	1–0	1–0	1–0	1–1	1–1	1–0	1–1	1–0	2–0	4–0	2–2	1–5	0–0	1–0	2–2
AEL	0–3		0–0	1–0	0–2	3–0	1–0	0–0	1–0	1–0	2–2	0–0	0–0	1–0	2–0	1–0	3–0	1–0	1–1	0–2
Agios Dimitrios	2–1	1–1		3–1	2–1	2–2	2–0	4–1	0–0	3–1	3–2	2–1	2–1	2–2	5–0	0–0	0–1	1–0	2–0	1–0
Agios Nikolaos	2–1	1–1	3–1		1–0	1–0	3–0	0–1	2–3	1–1	4–0	0–0	0–2	1–0	2–0	0–1	1–1	1–1	2–0	0–0
Agrotikos Asteras	3–1	0–2	2–0	2–1		3–1	0–1	0–4	3–0	3–1	2–3	1–0	2–2	2–0	4–1	1–0	3–1	0–0	2–0	3–0
Chania	2–2	3–3	1–2	1–0	1–4		1–0	0–1	1–0	0–0	4–1	1–0	0–1	3–1	5–0	0–1	2–1	0–3	2–0	1–0
Ethnikos Piraeus	2–1	1–1	1–1	1–0	0–3	0–1		1–0	1–0	0–0	0–0	1–2	1–2	1–2	1–1	1–2	4–3	1–2	2–0	2–0
Ergotelis	3–1	3–1	3–0	2–1	1–0	6–0	3–0		3–2	1–0	2–1	3–0	3–0	2–0	6–0	1–0	7–0	2–0	4–1	3–0
ILTEX Lykoi	0–2	2–0	1–0	0–0	1–1	1–0	2–1	0–1		0–0	1–0	4–1	1–1	0–0	4–1	0–1	2–4	1–0	2–0	1–0
Kastoria	0–0	2–0	0–0	1–1	2–1	2–1	1–0	0–0	0–0		2–1	1–0	3–3	2–1	3–0	3–4	1–0	1–1	0–3	0–0
Kilkisiakos	1–1	2–2	1–1	1–0	1–0	3–0	3–1	2–1	2–3	4–1		1–0	3–0	3–2	8–1	1–0	1–1	2–2	3–0	0–1
Leonidio	3–0	2–0	2–0	3–1	1–1	0–0	1–1	1–1	2–2	1–0	2–0		1–1	1–1	3–0	1–1	0–1	1–0	1–0	0–0
Levadiakos	3–2	2–0	2–0	1–0	1–0	5–3	2–0	3–2	0–0	2–1	3–2	1–2		2–1	3–0	1–0	3–3	2–0	2–1	1–1
Marko	2–0	2–1	2–1	1–0	1–0	2–0	1–1	1–1	3–0	3–0	1–3	1–1	0–1		2–1	1–0	2–1	0–0	2–0	3–0
Nafpaktiakos Asteras	0–2	2–2	0–2	0–0	2–4	0–1	1–1	1–2	0–4	0–3	1–4	0–1	0–2	0–3		0–0	1–1	1–4	3–0	1–2
Niki Volos	1–0	2–0	1–0	2–0	0–1	2–1	1–0	0–0	2–2	1–0	1–1	1–0	0–0	2–0	2–0		2–1	0–0	2–1	1–0
Poseidon Neon Poron	2–0	2–0	2–0	1–0	1–0	3–1	5–0	4–1	2–0	2–1	1–0	3–0	2–0	3–0	5–0	2–1		2–1	5–1	1–0
Thrasyvoulos	1–2	1–0	1–1	1–0	4–1	3–1	1–1	3–0	1–1	1–1	1–0	1–0	0–1	2–0	7–1	0–0	0–1		3–0	1–0
Trikala	3–2	1–1	2–1	0–0	0–1	5–0	0–1	1–0	1–2	0–2	0–2	0–2	1–4	0–0	0–2	0–2	0–2	1–3		1–2
Vyzas	1–0	1–0	1–1	2–0	1–1	3–0	0–1	0–1	3–0	1–0	2–3	0–1	2–3	0–1	1–0	4–1	1–2	1–2	1–0	

Legend: Blue = home team win; Yellow = draw; Red = away team win.

== Promotion play-off ==
8 June 2003

Kavala	1–2 (a.e.t.)	Levadiakos
Tsangaris 76' (o.g.)		Tsangaris 21'; Pastos 97' (pen.)

Alcazar Stadium, Larissa
Referee: Giannis Spyropoulos (Phthiotis)

== Top scorers ==
Rank	Player	Club	Goals
1	(Nigeria) Patrick Ogunsoto	Ergotelis	30
2	(Greece) Panagiotis Kyparissis	Poseidon Neon Poron	22
3	(Greece) Nikolaos Soultanidis	Kilkisiakos	21
4	(Greece) Fotis Tsangaris	Levadiakos	19
5	(Greece) Michalis Klokidis	Thrasyvoulos	18
