= Skarlatos =

Skarlatos is a Greek surname and forename.

People with the name include:

== Surname ==
- Alek Skarlatos (born 1992), American soldier, Knight of the French Legion of Honour
- Konstantinos Skarlatos (1872–1969), Greek army officer and Olympic sports shooter
- Vasilis Skarlatos (born 1984), Greek footballer
- Nikoletta Skarlatos, actress starring in Night Train (1999 film)

== Given name ==
- Skarlatos Kallimachi, Prince of Wallachia (1821) and Prince of Moldavia (1806, 1807–1810, 1812–1819)
- Skarlatos Soutsos, Greek Minister of Affairs before 1854, succeeded by Dimitrios Kallergis
