= Vasilis Avramidis =

Greek footballer (born in 1977)

Personal information
- Full name: Vasiliοs Avramidis
- Date of birth: 8 April 1977 (age 49)
- Place of birth: Thessaloniki, Greece
- Height: 1.80 m (5 ft 11 in)
- Position: Defender

Youth career
- Iraklis

Senior career*
Years	Team	Apps	(Gls)
1995–1996	Iraklis		
1996–1999	Agrotikos Asteras		
1999–2001	Lykoi		
2001–2003	Kavala		
2003	Atromitos		
2003–2004	Kerkyra		
2004–2005	Panserraikos		
2005–2006	Niki Volos		
2006–2008	Panetolikos	42	(0)
2008	Alexandroupoli Enosi		
2009–?	Makedonikos		
- * Club domestic league appearances and goals

Vasilis Avramidis (Greek: Βασίλης Αβραμίδης; born 8 April 1977) is a Greek former professional footballer who played as a defender.
