= Jean-Paul Ndeki =

Cameroonian footballer

Personal information
- Full name: Jean-Paul Ndjoumeck Ndeki
- Date of birth: 27 October 1982 (age 44)
- Place of birth: Cameroon
- Height: 1.95 m (6 ft 5 in)
- Position: Centre-back

Team information
- Current team: Al-Quwa Al-Jawiya

Senior career*
Years	Team	Apps	(Gls)
1997–2003	Eintracht Frankfurt II	72	(4)
2003–2004	Borussia Fulda	25	(13)
2004–2005	FK Venta	9	(0)
2006–2010	FK Ventspils	53	(10)
2008	→ Qingdao Jonoon (loan)	12	(1)
2010–2011	AEP Paphos FC	16	(0)
2013–	Al-Quwa Al-Jawiya		
- * Club domestic league appearances and goals as of 18 May 2010

Jean-Paul Ndeki (born 27 October 1982 in Cameroon) is a footballer who last plays for Al-Quwa Al-Jawiya.

His brother, Edouard Oum Ndeki, was a professional footballer who played in Turkey and Greece.
