= Savvas Giannakidis =

Greek footballer

Personal information
- Date of birth: 19 November 1977 (age 48)
- Place of birth: Ardassa, Greece
- Height: 1.80 m (5 ft 11 in)
- Position: Forward

Senior career*
Years	Team	Apps	(Gls)
1998–1999	Paniliakos		
1999–2000	Athinaikos		
2000–2002	Paniliakos		
2002–2004	Ethnikos Asteras		
2004–2007	Thrasyvoulos		
2007	Diagoras		
2008	Pierikos		
2008-2009	Koropi		
- * Club domestic league appearances and goals

Savvas Giannakidis (Greek: Σάββας Γιαννακίδης; born 19 November 1977) is a Greek former professional footballer.
