= Giannis Katemis =

Greek footballer

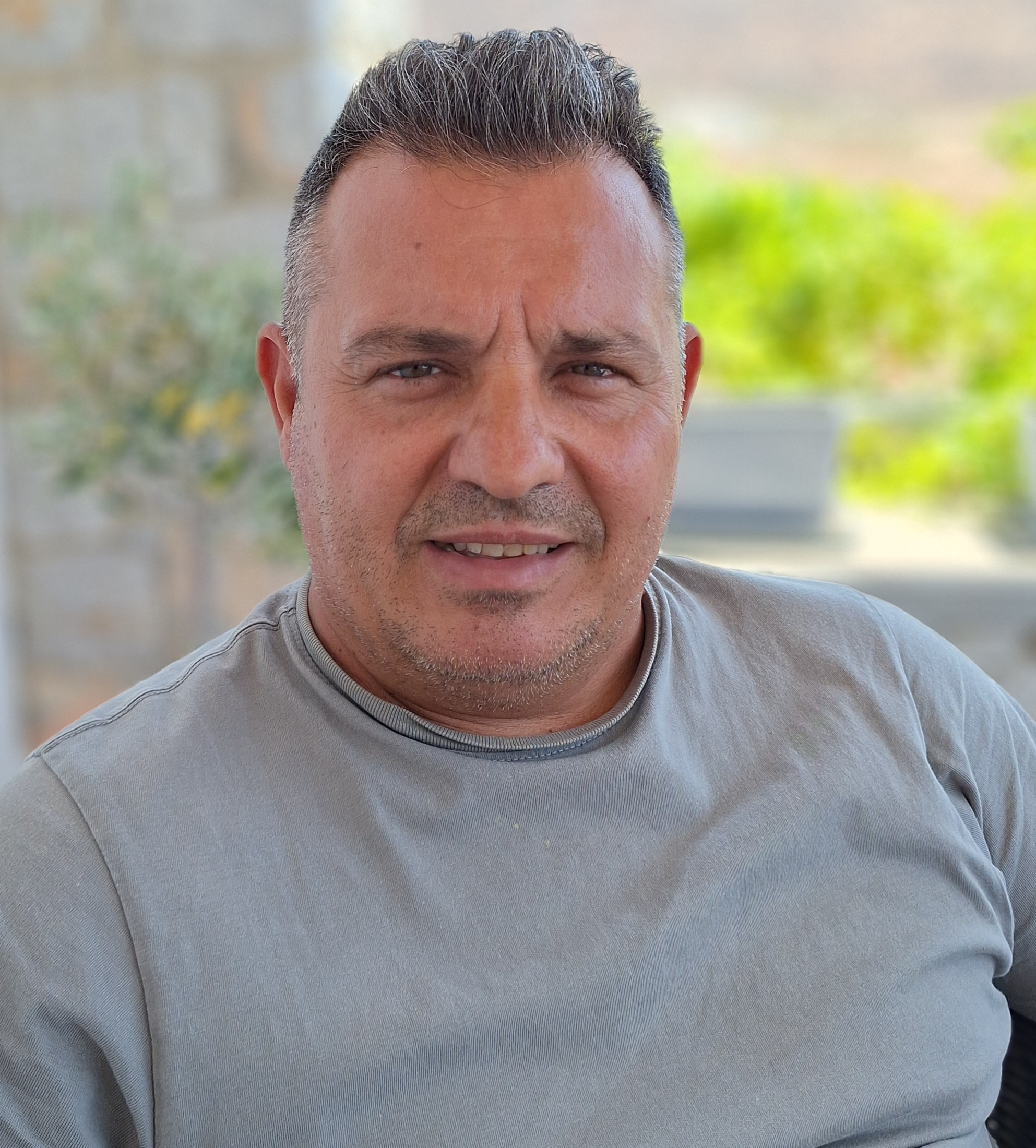

Personal information
- Full name: Ioannis Katemis
- Date of birth: 28 May 1977 (age 49)
- Place of birth: Limnes, Argolis, Greece
- Height: 1.68 m (5 ft 6 in)
- Position: Defender

Senior career*
Years	Team	Apps	(Gls)
1994–1999	Panargiakos	66	(7)
1999–2004	Chalkidona	156	(16)
2004–2009	Atromitos	120	(7)
2009	Panetolikos	9	(0)
2010–2011	Ilioupoli		
- * Club domestic league appearances and goals

Giannis Katemis (Greek: Γιάννης Κατεμής; born 28 May 1977) is a retired Greek professional football defender.

== Career ==
Born in Limnes, Argolis, Katemis began his football career with Panargiakos F.C. in the Beta Ethniki. He would play in the Alpha Ethniki for Chalkidona F.C. and Atromitos F.C. before moving to the lower levels of Greek football.
