= Loukas Karakatsanis =

Greek footballer

Personal information
- Full name: Loukas Karakatsanis
- Date of birth: 22 October 1981 (age 45)
- Place of birth: Livadeia, Greece
- Height: 1.77 m (5 ft 10 in)
- Positions: Midfielder; forward

Senior career*
Years	Team	Apps	(Gls)
1998–2007	Levadiakos	104	(16)
2007–2008	Panetolikos	29	(11)
2008–2009	Diagoras	11	(0)
2010	Zakynthos		
2010–2011	Tilikratis		
2011–2012	Chalkida		
2012–2013	Parnassos		
- * Club domestic league appearances and goals

Loukas Karakatsanis (born 22 October 1981 in Livadeia, Greece) is a Greek former professional football who played as a midfielder.
