= Martín Morales =

Uruguayan footballer (born 1978)

Personal information
- Full name: Martín Esteban Morales Icasuriaga
- Date of birth: 30 November 1978 (age 47)
- Place of birth: Montevideo, Uruguay
- Height: 1.76 m (5 ft 9 in)
- Position: Midfielder

Youth career
- Racing Montevideo

Senior career*
Years	Team	Apps	(Gls)
1996–1997	Racing Montevideo	19	(3)
1998–1999	Racing Club	0	(0)
1999–2000	Chacarita Juniors		
2000	Racing Montevideo		
2001	Progreso	4	(0)
2002	Alianza de Montevideo	6	(0)
2003	Rivera Livramento	2	(0)
2004	Deportes Antofagasta		
2004	Deportivo Italmaracaibo	8	(0)
2004	→ Deportivo Maracaibo (loan)		(1)
2005	Colorado Rapids	1	(0)
2005–2007	Ethnikos Asteras	0	(0)
2006	→ Cerrito (loan)	8	(0)
2007	Cerrito	1	(0)
2007–2008	Aiolikos	–	(–)
2008–2009	Universitario de Sucre	10	(0)
2009	Uruguay Montevideo	11	(8)
2010	Suchitepéquez	14	(1)
2010	Heredia Jaguares		
2011	Deportes Quindío	27	(3)
2012	Cúcuta Deportivo	9	(0)
2013	Canadian	22	(6)
2013	CD FAS	4	(0)
- * Club domestic league appearances and goals

Martín Esteban Morales Icasuriaga (born 30 November 1978) is a Uruguayan former professional footballer who played as a midfielder.

== Teams ==
- (Uruguay) Racing MVD 1996–1997
- (Argentina) Racing Club 1998–1999
- (Argentina) Chacarita Juniors 1999–2000
- (Uruguay) Racing MVD 2000
- (Uruguay) Progreso 2001
- (Uruguay) Alianza UY 2002
- (Uruguay) Rivera Livramento 2003
- (Chile) Deportes Antofagasta 2004
- (Venezuela) Deportivo Italmaracaibo 2004
- (Venezuela) Deportivo Maracaibo 2004
- (United States) Colorado Rapids 2005
- (Greece) Ethnikos Asteras 2005–2006
- (Uruguay) Cerrito 2006–2007
- (Greece) Aiolikos 2007–2008
- (Bolivia) Universitario de Sucre 2008–2009
- Uruguay Montevideo 2009
- (Guatemala) Deportivo Suchitepéquez 2010
- (Guatemala) Heredia Jaguares 2010
- (Colombia) Deportes Quindío 2011
- (Colombia) Cúcuta Deportivo 2012
- (Uruguay) Canadian 2013
- (El Salvador) CD FAS 2013
