= Aristidis Xevgenis =

Greek footballer

Aris Xevgenis
Personal information
- Full name: Aristidis Xevgenis
- Date of birth: 12 May 1981 (age 45)
- Place of birth: Agrinio, Greece
- Height: 1.70 m (5 ft 7 in)
- Position: Striker

Team information
- Current team: AE Mesologgi

Senior career*
Years	Team	Apps	(Gls)
2004–2007	Panetolikos	47	(10)
2007	Thyella Patras	1	(0)
2008	Aiolikos	20	(4)
2008	Koropi	17	(3)
2009–2010	Nafpaktiakos Asteras	0	(0)
2010	Iraklis Psachna F.C.	5	(0)
2011	Chalkida F.C.	15	(1)
2011–current	AE Mesologgi		
- * Club domestic league appearances and goals

Aristidis 'Aris' Xevgenis (Greek: Αριστείδης 'Άρης' Ξευγένης; born 12 May 1981) is a Greek footballer who plays for Nafpaktiakos Asteras.

Born in Agrinio, Xevghenis began his professional career with Panetolikos F.C. in August 2004, having previously played for the club in the Delta Ethniki.
