= Vlatko Gošev =

Macedonian footballer

Personal information
- Full name: Vlatko Gošev; Влатко Гошев
- Date of birth: 10 September 1974 (age 52)
- Place of birth: Vinica, SR Macedonia, SFRY
- Position: Midfielder

Youth career
- Sloga Vinica

Senior career*
Years	Team	Apps	(Gls)
–2000	Sileks	8+	(1+)
2000–2001	Rabotnički Kometal	3	(1)
2001–2002	Vardar	26	(0)
2002–2003	PAS Giannina	17	(0)
2003–2004	Vardar	20	(0)
2004	Levadiakos	13	(1)
2005–2008	Anagennisi Arta	9	(0)

International career
1996–1999	Macedonia	22	(0)
- * Club domestic league appearances and goals

Vlatko Gošev (Macedonian: Влатко Гошев; born 10 September 1974), also spelled as Vlatko Gušev (Macedonian: Влатко Гушев), is a retired Macedonian football midfielder, who last played for Anagennisi Arta.

== International career ==
He made his senior debut for Macedonia in a March 1996 friendly match against Malta in Prilep and has earned a total of 22 caps, scoring no goals. His final international was a February 1999 friendly against Albania.

== External sources ==
- Vlatko Gošev at National-Football-Teams.com
