= Stratos Garozis =

Greek footballer

Personal information
- Full name: Efstratios Garozis
- Date of birth: 10 November 1976 (age 49)
- Place of birth: Ioannina, Greece
- Height: 1.84 m (6 ft 0 in)
- Position: Midfielder

Senior career*
Years	Team	Apps	(Gls)
–1995	Velissario		
1995–1999	Kalamata		
1999–2002	PAS Giannina		
2002–2003	Akratitos		
2003–2004	PAS Giannina		
2004–2006	Kerkyra		
2006–2007	Messiniakos		
2007–2009	Pierikos		
2009–2010	Trikala		
2010	Pyrsos Grevena		
2010–2011	Doxa Kranoula		
2012	Thesprotos		
- * Club domestic league appearances and goals

Stratos Garozis (Greek: Στράτος Γκαρόζης; born 10 October 1976) is a Greek former professional footballer who played as a midfielder.
