= Edu Sales =

Brazilian footballer (born 1977)

Personal information
- Full name: Eduardo Junqueira Sales
- Date of birth: 13 December 1977 (age 48)
- Place of birth: São Paulo, Brazil
- Height: 1.73 m (5 ft 8 in)
- Position: Midfielder

Senior career*
Years	Team	Apps	(Gls)
2000	União São João		
2001	Vitória		
2002	São Caetano	3	(1)
2003	Coritiba	39	(7)
2004	Jeonbuk Hyundai	18	(4)
2005	São Caetano	3	(1)
2005–2006	Akratitos	16	(4)
2006	Coritiba	12	(4)
2006–2007	Créteil	5	(0)
2007	C.D. Nacional	6	(0)
2008	Figueirense		
2009	Ceará		
- * Club domestic league appearances and goals as of October 30, 2007

Eduardo Junqueira Sales also known as Edu Sales (born 13 December 1977) is a former Brazilian football player who played as midfielder.
