= Edouard Oum Ndeki =

Cameroonian footballer

Personal information
- Full name: Joseph Edouard Oum Ndeki
- Date of birth: 8 May 1976
- Place of birth: Douala, Cameroon
- Date of death: 7 March 2009 (aged 32)
- Position: Midfielder

Senior career*
| Years | Team | Apps | (Gls) |
| 1997 | Port FC de Douala | 21 | (0) |
| 1999 | Ankaragücü | 4 | (0) |
| 2004–2005 | Achaiki | | |
| 2005–2007 | Atsalenios | 50 | (32) |
| 2007–2008 | Diagoras | | |
| 2008 | Rodos | | |

International career
| 1999 | Cameroon | 1 | (0) |
- * Club domestic league appearances and goals

Joseph Edouard Oum Ndeki (8 May 1976 – 7 March 2009 in Rhodes) was a Cameroonian footballer who last played for Rodos. He started his career in high school where he played for Lycée de New bell soccer team and quickly captioned the attention of national league recruiters. He was forced to quit high school and his first contract with Union Douala, a division one team based in Douala. His professional career in Cameroon led him to play for Mount Cameroon FC and Coton Sport de Garoua where he was discovered by Cameroon national football team coach Pierre Lechantre who granted him his first selection with the national team.

== Club career ==
Oum Ndeki had a spell with Ankaragücü in the Turkish Süper Lig. He also played several seasons in Greece for Achaiki, Atsalenios, Diagoras and Rodos.

During his 4.5 years in Greece he played 125 games in the Third Division scoring 52 goals.

== International career ==
Oum Ndeki made an appearance for the senior Cameroon national football team during a 2000 African Cup of Nations qualifying match in 1999.

== Personal ==
His brother, Jean-Paul Ndeki, is also a professional footballer who played in Germany and Latvia.

== Death ==
He died suddenly on Saturday 7 March 2009 in a Rhodes hospital after suffering from hepatitis. He left behind two children, a boy and girl.
