= Giannis Lazanas =

Greek footballer

Personal information
- Full name: Ioannis Ilias Lazanas
- Date of birth: 5 May 1980 (age 46)
- Place of birth: Athens, Greece
- Height: 1.85 m (6 ft 1 in)
- Position: Forward

Senior career*
Years	Team	Apps	(Gls)
1997–2001	Panegialios		
2001–2003	Patraikos		
2003–2005	Aris		
2005–2006	Kallithea		
2006–2008	Atromitos		
2008	Ionikos		
2008–2009	Anagennisi Karditsa		
2009–2012	Apollon Smyrnis		
2012–2014	Panegialios		
2014	Ethnikos Piraeus		
- * Club domestic league appearances and goals

Giannis Lazanas (Greek: Γιάννης Λαζανάς; born 5 May 1980) is a retired Greek football striker.
