= Nikos Kyzeridis =

Greek footballer

Personal information
- Full name: Nikolaos Kyzeridis
- Date of birth: 20 April 1971 (age 55)
- Place of birth: Thessaloniki, Greece
- Height: 1.74 m (5 ft 9 in)
- Positions: Attacking midfielder; striker

Senior career*
| Years | Team | Apps | (Gls) |
| 1990–1995 | Naoussa | 145 | (39) |
| 1995–1998 | Paniliakos | 82 | (17) |
| 1998 | Portsmouth | 4 | (0) |
| 1998–2004 | Aris | 140 | (26) |
| 2004–2005 | Veria | 28 | (6) |
| 2005–2009 | Agrotikos Asteras | 87 | (30) |
| 2009 | Makedonikos | 8 | (0) |
| 2009–2010 | Aetos Skydras | 0 | (0) |
| Total | | 494 | (118) |

International career
| 1998 | Greece | 1 | (0) |
- * Club domestic league appearances and goals

Nikos Kyzeridis (Greek: Νίκος Κυζερίδης, born 20 April 1971) is a Greek former professional footballer who played as an attacking midfielder and a striker. He amassed close to 500 league appearances at club level while making one appearance for the Greece national team in 1998.

== Club career ==
Born in Thessaloniki, Greece, Kyzeridis began his career at Naoussa at the age of 19, playing 145 games and scoring 39 goals for the club.

On 1995, he was signed by newly promoted Paniliakos to help the team's cause at the 1995–96 season of Alpha Ethniki. He stayed there for three seasons, playing 82 times and scoring 17 goals.

Nikos' talent did not go unnoticed by English Championship club Portsmouth, and in July 1998 they signed him. However, he only played four times for the club, and in December 1998 he was sold to Aris. He spent five full seasons at Aris, scoring 26 goals, and helping the team to qualify for the UEFA Cup twice and even reach the Greek Cup final of 2003, where they lost against PAOK.

Nikos joined Veria for the 2004–05 season. He played 28 times and scored 6 goals.

In August 2005 he joined the Beta Ethniki side Agrotikos Asteras. Until December 2008 (when he left the club) he scored 30 goals in 87 games, being one of the star players of the club.

In January 2009 he joined Makedonikos, without much success. He left the club at the end of the 2008–09 season and joined the Delta Ethniki side Aetos Skydras, for one year, until he retired at the age of 39.

== International career ==
On 8 April 1998, Nikos Kyzeridis played for Greece in a friendly match against Romania.

== Health issues ==
When Kyzeridis turned 41 he was diagnosed with cancer in his lymph nodes. After three years the cost became unbearable and having considered not paying anymore so that his family could survive, his operations were funded by the help of multiple charities.
