= Giannis Mallous =

Greek footballer

Personal information
- Full name: Ioannis Mallous
- Date of birth: 7 February 1974 (age 52)
- Place of birth: Dortmund, Germany
- Height: 1.84 m (6 ft 0 in)
- Position: Right-back

Senior career*
Years	Team	Apps	(Gls)
–1994	Philippos Melikis		
1994–1999	Veria	69	(2)
1999–2004	Aris	74	(2)
2004–2005	Veria		
2005–2009	Agrotikos Asteras		
- * Club domestic league appearances and goals

Giannis Mallous (Greek: Γιάννης Μαλλούς; born 7 February 1974) is a Greek former professional footballer who played as a right-back.

== Career ==
Mallous started his career in Agia Triada and later he played in Philippos Melikis. In 1994, he moved to Veria, with which he played in Alpha Ethniki, when his team promoted in the Alpha Ethniki. In 1999, he went to Aris, in where he played 5 1/2 seasons. Mallous played with Aris in UEFA Cup and the Greek Cup final.

In summer of 2004 he returned in Veria and the following year he went to Agrotikos Asteras, in where he stopped his career, in 2009.

== Statistics in the Super League ==
Season	Club	Appearances (Goals)
1996-97	Veria	27 (0)
1997-98	Veria	28 (1)
1998-99a	Veria	14 (1)
1998-99b	Aris	14 (1)
1999-00	Aris	29 (1)
2000-01	Aris	1 (0)
2001-02	Aris	3 (0)
2002-03	Aris	18 (1)
2003-04	Aris	23 (0)

== Honours ==
Aris Thessaloniki

- Greek Football Cup: Runner up (2002–03)
