= Municipal Stadium of Kastoria =

Multi-purpose stadium in Kastoria, Greece

Coordinates: 40.530083°N 21.258096°E

- Interactive map of Municipal Stadium of Kastoria
- Full name: Municipal Stadium of Kastoria
- Location: Kastoria, Greece
- Owner: Kastoria Municipality
- Capacity: 8,000
- Surface: Grass

Construction
- Built: 1990

Tenant
- Kastoria F.C.

Municipal Stadium of Kastoria is a multi-use stadium in Kastoria, Greece. It is currently used mostly for football matches and has a capacity of 8,000 seats.
