= Panagiotis Bekiaris =

Greek footballer (born in 1980)

Personal information
- Date of birth: 8 July 1980 (age 46)
- Place of birth: Thessaloniki, Greece
- Height: 1.82 m (6 ft 0 in)
- Position: Forward

Senior career*
Years	Team	Apps	(Gls)
1999–2002	Iraklis		
2000–2001	→ Apollon Smyrnis (loan)		
2002	→ Apollon Smyrnis (loan)		
2002–2008	Agrotikos Asteras		
2008–2009	Apollon Kalamarias		
2009–2011	Agrotikos Asteras		
2011–2012	Anagennisi Epanomi		
2012–2013	Ethnikos Gazoros		
2013–2014	Agrotikos Asteras		
- * Club domestic league appearances and goals

Panagiotis Bekiaris (Greek: Παναγιώτης Μπεκιάρης; born 8 July 1980) is a Greek former professional footballer who played as a forward.
