= Vasilios Skarlatos =

Greek footballer (born 1984)

Personal information
- Date of birth: 2 February 1984 (age 42)
- Place of birth: Greece
- Height: 1.86 m (6 ft 1 in)
- Position: Forward

Team information
- Current team: Kalamata
- Number: 29

Senior career*
Years	Team	Apps	(Gls)
2003–2005	Akratitos	11	(0)
2004	→ Vyzas (loan)		
2005	→ Vyzas (loan)		
2005–2007	Kavala		
2007–2008	Olympiacos Volos		
2008	Doxa Drama		
2009–2010	Kalamata		
2010–2011	Rodos F.C.		
2011	Tilikratis F.C.		
2012–	Kalamata		
- * Club domestic league appearances and goals

Vasilios Skarlatos (Greek: Βασίλειος Σκαρλάτος; born 2 February 1984) is a Greek footballer .

Skarlatos played youth football for Akratitos F.C., and signed a professional contract with the club in January 2003. He made 11 appearances for the club in the Alpha Ethniki during the 2002–03 and 2003–04 seasons.
