= Poseidon Neon Poron =

Disbanded association football club in Greece

A.E. Poseidon Neon Poron
- Full name: Athlitiki Enosi Poseidon Neon Poron
- Founded: 1979; 46 years ago
- Dissolved: 2017; 8 years ago
- Ground: Neoi Poroi Stadium
- Capacity: 500
Home colours	Away colours

Athlitiki Enosi Poseidon Neon Poron, known as Poseidon Neoi Poroi, was a football club based in Neoi Poroi, Pieria, Greece. Its colours were blue and white. The home games of the team was taking place at the Neoi Poroi Stadium.

== History ==
The Athletic Club of Neoi Poroi "Poseidon" was founded in 1979. After merger with Thermaikos Platamonas in 1987, the football club was renamed to Athletic Association of Poroi Platamonas. After merger with Athletic Association of Kastro Neos Panteleimonas in 1993, the football club was renamed to Athletic Association of Poroi Platamonas Panteleimonas "Poseidon" which was dissolved in 2004. The football club was refounded in 2013 as Athletic Association of Neoi Poroi "Poseidon" which was dissolved in 2017.

The most important success of the club was the conquest of the championship of the Gamma Ethniki in the period 2002–2003. Also, noteworthy is their participation in the championship of the Beta Ethniki in the seasons 2003–2004, when they finished 5th, and 2004–2005 when they were eliminated.

== Honours ==
=== Leagues ===
- Gamma Ethniki (Third National Division)
  - Winners (1): 2002–03
