= Oumar Bagayoko =

Malian footballer

Personal information
- Full name: Oumar Bagayoko
- Date of birth: 19 September 1975 (age 51)
- Place of birth: Mali
- Position: Forward

Senior career*
Years	Team	Apps	(Gls)
1992–1994	Djoliba		
1994	Austria Wien	3	(0)
1999–2000	Khaitan		
2002–2003	Athinaikos	23	(2)
2004–2005	Thrasyvoulos		
2005–2006	Chalkida-Lilas		

International career
2000	Mali	1	(0)
- * Club domestic league appearances and goals

Oumar Bagayoko (born September 19, 1975) is a retired Malian footballer.

== Career ==
Bagayoko played for Djoliba AC and briefly in Austria Wien. He later played in Kuwait before starting a career in Greece. Here he played for Athinaikos F.C. in the Greek Beta Ethniki, later for Thrasyvoulos F.C. and Chalkida-Lilas F.C. in the Greek Gamma Ethniki.

Bagayoko made several appearances for the Mali national football team, including a 2000 African Nations Cup qualifier and a 2002 FIFA World Cup qualifier against Libya.
