= Agrotikos Asteras Stadium =

Football stadium in Thessaloniki, Greece

Coordinates: 40.66701°N 22.90822°E

Dimitris Kontikakis Stadium
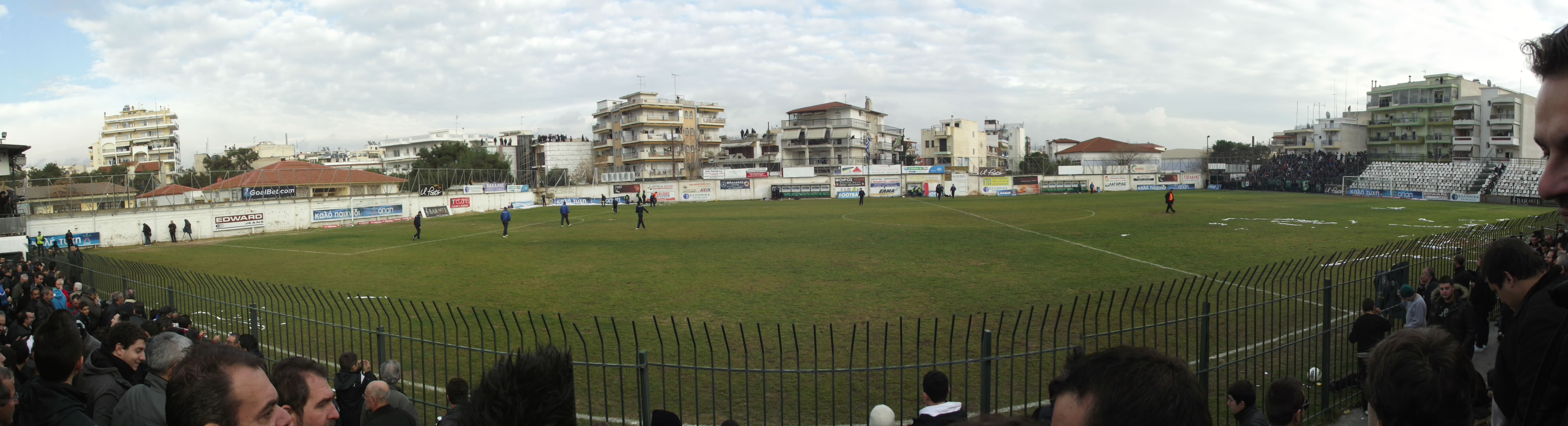
- Interactive map of Dimitris Kontikakis Stadium
- Full name: Gipedo Evosmou Dimitris Kontikakis Stadium
- Location: Evosmos; Thessaloniki; Greece
- Owner: Agrotikos Asteras F.C.
- Operator: Agrotikos Asteras F.C.
- Capacity: 2,267
- Surface: Grass

Construction
- Opened: 1950

Tenant
- Agrotikos Asteras F.C.

Dimitris Kontikakis Stadium otherwise known as Gipedo Evosmou is a football stadium located in the suburb of Evosmos in Thessaloniki, Greece.

== History ==
Built and opened in 1950, it can hold up to 2267 spectators. On one occasion, a record 4067 fans were seated within the precinct in 1979. Two new platforms were constructed in 1994. To honor former chairman Dimitris Kontikakis, the club board decided to change the stadium's name to Dimitris Kontikakis Stadium.

Improvements and maintenance work were done to the stadium to preserve it for the upcoming 2015–16 season.

In January 2017, a home game was adjourned until a later date as ice was present in the corners of the pitch which posed an inevitable risk to footballers.
