= Agrotikos Asteras F.C. =

Agrotikos Asteras
- Full name: Proodeutikos Morfotikos Athlitikos Syllogos Agrotikos Asteras
- Founded: 1932; 94 years ago
- Ground: Agrotikos Asteras Stadium
- Capacity: 2,267
- Chairman: Konstantinos Giaouris
- Manager: Panagiotis Papadopoulos
- League: Macedonia FCA First Division
- 2025–26: Macedonia FCA Second Division, 1st (promoted)
Home colours

Agrotikos Asteras Football Club (Greek: Π.Μ.Α.Σ. Αγροτικός Αστήρ) is a Evosmos-based football club, currently playing in Macedonia Football Clubs Association. It was founded in 1932 by refugees from Asia Minor.

== History ==
Agrotikos Asteras was founded by Greek refugees from Asia Minor, that formerly lived in Koukloutzas, Smyrni. The idea of the club's establishment was conceived by a group of teenagers living in Neos Koukloutzas, Thessaloniki and it was assisted by a Greek army officer Dimitris Kodikakis. Its statute was handed to Greek court on 10 January 1930. The most successful season in the team's history was the 2005–06 season, when the club won the trophy of Gamma Ethniki and reached the semi-finals of the Greek Cup. The best ranking players of that season were Nikos Kyzeridis and Nikos Sakellaridis.

old logo of the team

previous logo of the team

== 2005–06 season ==
=== League ===
2005–06 was the most successful season in history of the club. Agrotikos finished 1st in Gamma Ethniki and achieved promotion to Beta Ethniki for the first time in its history. The team had numerous wins with big scores (including 5–1 vs. Kavala, 6–0 vs. Polykastro, and won many matches by a score of 4–0.).

=== Cup ===
Agrotikos Asteras was the topic of many articles in the Greek football world. A team from Euosmos reached the semi-finals of the Greek Cup, an event which the fans called an underdog story. In the second and third rounds, Agrotikos knocked out Vyzas Megara (6–2) and Kastoria F.C. (3–1). In the fourth round, Agrotikos achieved another victory, winning 5–4 on penalties against Greek giants PAOK (90 minutes and extra time finished 1–1). Another win, this time against Ergotelis (2–0), granted them a spot in the quarter-finals, where Agrotikos Asteras played Ethnikos Asteras in a two-legged round. The away match ended 1–1 with a goal by the club captain Nikos Kyzeridis, while Agrotikos won the home leg by 4–0 (scorers: Kalliakis, Iordanidis 2, Bekiaris). With an aggregate score of 5–1, Agrotikos Asteras was through to the semi-finals. The club drew AEK Athens, the third most decorated club of the competition, as their opponent. The away leg resulted in a 3–0 defeat (Liberopoulos, Moras and Sapanis scored), while the 1–0 home victory wasn't enough to grant the club from Thessaloniki a place in the final.

== Honours ==
- Gamma Ethniki
  - Winners (3): 2005–06, 2013–14, 2021–22
- Delta Ethniki
  - Winners (2): 1993–94, 2001–02
- Macedonia FCA First Division Champions
  - Winners (2): 1966–67, 1976–77
- Macedonia FCA Cup Winners
  - Winners (1): 1993–94
