= 2009–10 Greek Football Cup =

2009–10 Greek Cup
Hellas On Line Greek Cup

Tournament details
- Country: Greece
- Teams: 70

Final positions
- Champions: Panathinaikos (17th title)
- Runners-up: Aris

Tournament statistics
- Matches played: 79
- Goals scored: 167 (2.11 per match)
- Top goal scorer(s): Koke; Benjamin Onwuachi; Pavlos Leptokaridis (4 goals each)

The 2009–10 Greek Football Cup was the 68th edition of the Greek Football Cup. The competition culminated with the final held at Olympic Stadium on 24 April 2010. The final was contested by Panathinaikos and Aris. The last time that the two clubs were met in the Final was in 1940. Panathinaikos didn't win the Cup since 2004 and the last time that participated in a Final was in 2007. Aris on the other hand, didn't win the Cup since 1970 and the last time that played in a Final was in 2008. Panathinaikos earned the trophy with a 1-0 win over Aris.

== Calendar ==
Round	Date(s)	Fixtures	Clubs	New entries	Leagues entering
First Round	22, 23 August 2009	15	70 → 52	36	Gamma Ethniki
Second Round	30 August & 2, 3 September 2009	17	52 → 34	18	Beta Ethniki
Additional Round	23 September 2009	2	34 → 32	none	none
Round of 32	27–29 October 2009	16	32 → 16	16	Super League
Round of 16	13, 20 January 2010	12	16 → 8	none	none
Quarter-finals	2, 3, 10, 17 February 2010	8	8 → 4	none	none
Semi-finals	17, 24, 25 March, 7 April 2010	4	4 → 2	none	none
Final	24 April 2010	1	2 → 1	none	none

== Knockout phase ==
Each tie in the knockout phase, apart from the semi-finals, was played by a single match. If the score was level at the end of normal time, extra time was played, followed by a penalty shoot-out if the score was still level. In the semi-finals were played over two legs, with each team playing one leg at home. The team that scored more goals on aggregate over the two legs advanced to the next round. If the aggregate score was level, the away goals rule was applied, i.e. the team that scored more goals away from home over the two legs advanced. If away goals were also equal, then extra time was played. The away goals rule was again applied after extra time, i.e. if there were goals scored during extra time and the aggregate score was still level, the visiting team advanced by virtue of more away goals scored. If no goals were scored during extra time, the winners were decided by a penalty shoot-out. In the round of 16, if the score was level at the end of normal time the two-legged rule was applied.
The mechanism of the draws for each round is as follows:

- In the draw for the second round, the teams from the second division are seeded and the winners from the first round were unseeded. The seeded teams are drawn against the unseeded teams.
- In the draw for the Round of 32 onwards, the teams from the first division are seeded and the winners from the previous rounds were unseeded. The seeded teams are drawn against the unseeded teams.
- In the draws for the Round of 16 onwards, there are no seedings and teams from the different group can be drawn against each other.

== First round ==
The draw took place on 7 August 2009.

=== Summary ===
Team 1	Score	Team 2
22 August 2009
Fostiras	0–3 (w/o)	Atsalenios
Platanias	3–3 (7–6 p)	Niki Volos
Saronikos	3–0 (w/o)	Thermaikos
Doxa Kranoula	0–0 (4–3 p)	Zakynthos
Pyrsos Grevena	1–1 (5–6 p)	Kallithea
Anagennisi Epanomi	2–0 (a.e.t.)	PAO Rouf
Rodos	0–1	Korinthos
Aspropyrgos	3–1	Aias Salamina
Makedonikos	2–0	Ethnikos Filippiada
23 August 2009
Panargiakos	2–1	Vyzas Megara
PAONE	4–2	Panegialios
Panachaiki 2005	0–0 (5–4 p)	Chersonissos
Eordaikos 2007	1–0	Kozani
Anagennisi Giannitsa	4–3	Chaidari
Veria	1–0	Agia Paraskevi
Fokikos	0–1	Odysseas Anagennisi
Visaltiakos	2–1	Keravnos Keratea
Trikala	3–0 (w/o)	Kastoria

=== Matches ===
22 August 2009
16:00 EEST

Fostiras	0–3 (Awarded)	Atsalenios
	Report

Spyros Gialabidis Stadium, Tavros

22 August 2009
16:00 EEST

Platanias	3–3 (a.e.t.)	Niki Volos
Karybas 39'; Drakos 47'; Pangalos 117'	Report	Chatziliontas 45+1'; Gómez 90+1', 111'
Penalties
	7–6

Perivolia Municipal Stadium, Chania
Referee: Stavros Mantalos (Athens)

22 August 2009
17:00 EEST

Saronikos	3–0 (Awarded)	Thermaikos
	Report

Aegina Municipal Stadium, Aegina

22 August 2009
17:00 EEST

Doxa Kranoula	0–0 (a.e.t.)	Zakynthos
	Report
Penalties
	4–3

Kranoula Stadium, Perama
Referee: Fotis Fotiadis (Kastoria)

22 August 2009
17:00 EEST

Pyrsos Grevena	1–1 (a.e.t.)	Kallithea
Blithikiotis 5'	Report	Katsaros 38' (pen.)
Penalties
	5–6

DAK Grevena, Grevena
Referee: Stavros Mantalos (Athens)

22 August 2009
17:00 EEST

Anagennisi Epanomi	2–0 (a.e.t.)	PAO Rouf
Theodoridis 94'; Apostolidis 99' (pen.)	Report

Nikos Sarafis Stadium, Thessaloniki
Referee: Triantafyllos Tikas (Karditsa)

22 August 2009
18:00 EEST

Rodos	0–1	Korinthos
	Report	Skarmoutsos 88'

Diagoras Stadium, Rhodes
Referee: Panagiotis Gavrilis (Athens)

22 August 2009
19:00 EEST

Aspropyrgos	3–1	Aias Salamina
Zacharopoulos 50', 70'; Karamanos 58'	Report	Raptopoulos 81'

Aspropyrgos Municipal Stadium, Aspropyrgos
Referee: Georgios Maniatis (Arcadia)

22 August 2009
19:00 EEST

Makedonikos	2–0	Panserraikos
Chasomeris 6'; Tsatsos 53' (pen.)	Report

Makedonikos Stadium, Thessaloniki
Referee: Ioannis Kampaxis (Euboea)

23 August 2009
17:00 EEST

Panargiakos	2–1 (a.e.t.)	Vyzas Megara
Ioannou 41' (o.g.); Droulias 118'	Report	Roussos 90+2'

Argos Municipal Stadium, Argos
Referee: Andreas Lagos (Achaea)

23 August 2009
17:00 EEST

PAONE	4–2	Panegialios
Leptokaridis 6', 9', 70' (pen.), 83'	Report	Pawela 1' (pen.); Gatsis 38'

Neoi Epivates Stadium, Neoi Epivates
Referee: Giannis Topouzis (Thrace)

23 August 2009
17:00 EEST

Panachaiki 2005	0–0 (a.e.t.)	Chersonissos
	Report
Penalties
	5–4

Pampeloponnisiako Stadium, Patras
Referee: Christos Mitsios (Epirus)

23 August 2009
17:00 EEST

Eordaikos 2007	1–0	Kozani
Diamantopoulos 64'	Report

Emilios Theofanidis Stadium, Ptolemaida
Referee: Georgios Liachoudis (Macedonia)

23 August 2009
17:00 EEST

Anagennisi Giannitsa	4–3	Chaidari
Aldea 8', 27'; Tsiligeridis 35'; Kronhardt 58'	Report	Kantiou 18'; Labrinatos 63' (pen.), 65'

Giannitsa Municipal Stadium, Giannitsa
Referee: Evangelos Kiotzenis (Kavala)

23 August 2009
17:00 EEST

Veria	1–0	Agia Paraskevi
Kaltsas 19'	Report

Veria Stadium, Veria
Referee: Athanasios Strantzalidis (Thessaloniki)

23 August 2009
17:00 EEST

Fokikos	0–1 (a.e.t.)	Odysseas Anagennisi
	Report	Pavlidis 96'

Amfissa Municipal Stadium, Amfissa
Referee: Georgios Papandriopoulos (Piraeus)

23 August 2009
17:00 EEST

Visaltiakos	2–1	Keravnos Keratea
Roumpos 26'; Paschaloudis 70'	Report	Kouskounas 18'

Nigrita Stadium, Nigrita
Referee: Georgios Kyzas (Drama)

23 August 2009
19:00 EEST

Trikala	3–0 (Awarded)	Kastoria
	Report

Trikala Municipal Stadium, Trikala

== Second round ==
The draw took place on 7 August 2009, after the First Round draw.

=== Summary ===
Team 1	Score	Team 2
30 August 2009
Visaltiakos	2–0	Kerkyra
Panargiakos	0–4	Olympiacos Volos
2 September 2009
PAONE	1–0	Ilioupoli
Atsalenios	1–4	Ethnikos Asteras
Anagennisi Giannitsa	0–2	OFI
Platanias	2–3	Thrasyvoulos
Doxa Kranoula	1–3	Ionikos
Kallithea	3–0 (w/o)	Apollon Kalamarias
Aspropyrgos	1–1 (5–3 p)	Diagoras
Makedonikos	0–1 (a.e.t.)	Panserraikos
Veria	0–2	Panetolikos
Trikala	1–0	Anagennisi Karditsa
Korinthos	2–3	Kalamata
3 September 2009
Odysseas Anagennisi	2–2 (2–4 p)	Agrotikos Asteras
Saronikos	0–1 (a.e.t.)	Ethnikos Piraeus
Anagennisi Epanomi	1–1 (4–5 p)	Pierikos
Eordaikos 2007	3–1 (a.e.t.)	Doxa Drama
Panachaiki 2005	0–2 (a.e.t.)	Ilisiakos

=== Matches ===
30 August 2009
16:45 EEST

Visaltiakos	2–0	Kerkyra
Fotiadis 56'; Tsintogiannis 73'	Report

Nigrita Stadium, Nigrita
Referee: Praxitelis Zachariadis (Macedonia)

30 August 2009
16:45 EEST

Panargiakos	0–4	Olympiacos Volos
	Report	Martins 21'; Konteon 26'; Umbides 29' (pen.); Pliagas 82'

Argos Municipal Stadium, Argos
Referee: Periklis Giolias (Athens)

2 September 2009
16:45 EEST

PAONE	1–0	Ilioupoli
Aslanidis 17'	Report

Neoi Epivates Stadium, Neoi Epivates
Referee: Dimitrios Thanos (Grevena)

2 September 2009
16:45 EEST

Atsalenios	1–4	Ethnikos Asteras
Karademitros 90+4'	Report	Fabinho 4'; Ucar 36'; Chorianopoulos 58'; Pasas 79'

Atsalenios Stadium, Heraklion
Referee: Georgios Chatzis (West Attica)

2 September 2009
16:45 EEST

Anagennisi Giannitsa	0–2	OFI
	Report	Manousos 31', 85'

Giannitsa Municipal Stadium, Giannitsa
Referee: Alexandros Aretopoulos (Trikala)

2 September 2009
16:45 EEST

Platanias	2–3	Thrasyvoulos
Pangalos 12'; Drakos 20'	Report	Sapanis 7'; Chatzipantelidis 71', 74'

Perivolia Municipal Stadium, Chania
Referee: Christos Apostolidis (Piraeus)

2 September 2009
16:45 EEST

Doxa Kranoula	1–3	Ionikos
Lazaridis 9'	Report	Giondis 19'; Makrakis 78'; Langlet 90'

Kranoula Stadium, Ioannina
Referee: Konstantinos Protopsaltis (Corfu)

2 September 2009
16:45 EEST

Kallithea	3–0 (Awarded)	Apollon Kalamarias
	Report

Grigoris Lambrakis Stadium, Kallithea

2 September 2009
19:00 EEST

Aspropyrgos	1–1 (a.e.t.)	Diagoras
Karamanos 5'	Report	Milošković 27'
Penalties
	5–3

Aspropyrgos Municipal Stadium, Aspropyrgos
Referee: Panagiotis Karagounias (Achaea)

2 September 2009
19:00 EEST

Makedonikos	0–1 (a.e.t.)	Panserraikos
	Report	Kali 112'

Makedonikos Stadium, Thessaloniki
Referee: Ioannis Kementsetsidis (Kilkis)

2 September 2009
19:00 EEST

Veria	0–2	Panserraikos
	Report	Manú 28'; Gurma 31'

Veria Stadium, Veria
Referee: Antonis Valiotis (Larissa)

2 September 2009
19:00 EEST

Trikala	1–0	Anagennisi Karditsa
Manousakis 53'	Report

Trikala Municipal Stadium, Trikala
Referee: Giorgos Segos (Euboea)

2 September 2009
19:30 EEST

Korinthos	2–3	Kalamata
Popiela 10'; Skarmoutsos 32'	Report	Psychogiopoulos 45'; Kaminiotis 65'; Athanasopoulos 79'

Korinthos Stadium, Corinth
Referee: Konstantinos Vasilias (Boeotia)

3 September 2009
16:45 EEST

Odysseas Anagennisi	2–2 (a.e.t.)	Agrotikos Asteras
F. Samouilidis 42'; Gaidartzis 83'	Report	Bekiaris 34', 78' (pen.)
Penalties
	3–4

Anagennisi Municipal Stadium, Serres
Referee: Georgios Kominis (Thesprotia)

3 September 2009
16:45 EEST

Saronikos	0–1 (a.e.t.)	Ethnikos Piraeus
	Report	Vidalis 115'

Aegina Municipal Stadium, Aegina
Referee: Anastasios Papapetrou (Athens)

3 September 2009
16:45 EEST

Anagennisi Epanomi	1–1 (a.e.t.)	Pierikos
Kaptiev 52'	Report	Olguín 11' (pen.)
Penalties
	4–5

Nikos Sarafis Stadium, Thessaloniki
Referee: Petros Drosinos (Chalkidiki)

3 September 2009
16:45 EEST

Eordaikos 2007	3–1 (a.e.t.)	Doxa Drama
Tzelepis 28'; Tsoulakos 95'; Robinho 103'	Report	van Es 63'

Emilios Theofanidis Stadium, Ptolemaida
Referee: Georgios Konstantinidis (Macedonia)

3 September 2009
19:00 EEST

Panachaiki 2005	0–2 (a.e.t.)	Ilisiakos
	Report	Skaros 102'; Tsabouris 118'

Pampeloponnisiako Stadium, Patras
Referee: Ioannis Delfakis (Arcadia)

== Additional round ==
=== Summary ===
Team 1	Score	Team 2
23 September 2009
PAONE	0–1	Thrasyvoulos
Aspropyrgos	2–1 (a.e.t.)	Ethnikos Asteras

=== Matches ===
23 September 2009
15:30 EEST

PAONE	0–1	Thrasyvoulos
	Report	Chiquinho 90+2'

Neoi Epivates Stadium, Neoi Epivates
Referee: Triantafyllos Tikas (Karditsa)

23 September 2009
19:00 EEST

Aspropyrgos	2–1 (a.e.t.)	Ethnikos Asteras
Botaitis 90' (pen.); Chalimourdas 101'	Report	Ucar 70'

Aspropyrgos Municipal Stadium, Aspropyrgos
Referee: Gerasimos Ditsos (Preveza)

== Bracket ==
Round of 32
Eordaikos 2007	0
Panathinaikos	3
Pierikos	2(4)
Ergotelis	2(2)
Kallithea	1
Panthrakikos	0
Trikala	1
Iraklis	0
Visaltiakos	0
Atromitos (p)	0
Kalamata	0
PAS Giannina	3
Panserraikos	3
Olympiacos	1
OFI	0
PAOK	1
Ethnikos Piraeus	1
Skoda Xanthi	2
Olympiacos Volos	2
AEL	1
Aspropyrgos	3
Aris	4
Egaleo	0
Asteras Tripolis	3
Ionikos	1
Levadiakos	2
Agrotikos Asteras	0
Kavala	3
Thrasyvoulos (a.e.t.)	1
AEK Athens	0
Panetolikos (p)	0(7)
Panionios	0(8)

Round of 16
Panathinaikos	2
Pierikos	1
Kallithea (p)	1(4)
Trikala	1(3)
Atromitos	0
PAS Giannina (a.e.t.)	1
Panserraikos	0
PAOK	2
Skoda Xanthi	2
Olympiacos Volos	0
Aris	2
Asteras Tripolis	0
Levadiakos (p)	0(2)
Kavala	0(4)
Thrasyvoulos	0
Panionios	1

Quarter-finals
Panathinaikos	2
Kallithea	0
PAS Giannina	4
PAOK	0
Skoda Xanthi	1	0	1
Aris	1	3	4
Kavala (a.e.t.)	0	2	2
Panionios	0	1	1

Semi-finals
Panathinaikos	3	0	3
PAS Giannina	1	0	1
Aris	3	1	4
Kavala	1	1	2

Final
Panathinaikos	1
Aris	0

== Round of 32 ==
The draw took place on 7 August 2009.

=== Summary ===
Team 1	Score	Team 2
Panserraikos	3–1	Olympiacos
Eordaikos 2007	0–3	Panathinaikos
OFI	0–1	PAOK
Kalamata	0–3	PAS Giannina
Agrotikos Asteras	0–3	Kavala
Visaltiakos	0–0 (4–5 p)	Atromitos
Ethnikos Piraeus	1–2	Skoda Xanthi
Olympiacos Volos	2–1	AEL
Ionikos	1–2	Levadiakos
Kallithea	1–0	Panthrakikos
Egaleo	0–3	Asteras Tripolis
Pierikos	2–2 (4–2 p)	Ergotelis
Panetolikos	0–0 (7–8 p)	Panionios
Trikala	1–0	Iraklis
Aspropyrgos	3–4	Aris
Thrasyvoulos	1–0 (a.e.t.)	AEK Athens

=== Matches ===
27 October 2009
17:00 EET

Panserraikos	3–1	Olympiacos
Leozinho 17'; Athanasiadis 52'; Rimoldi 83' (pen.)	Report	Mitroglou 67'

Serres Municipal Stadium, Serres
Referee: Nathanail Charalampidis (Kavala)

28 October 2009
17:00 EET

Eordaikos 2007	0–3	Panathinaikos
	Report	Rukavina 3', 26'; Ninis 75'

Emilios Theofanidis Stadium, Ptolemaida
Referee: Apostolos Ambarkiolis (Thessaloniki)

28 October 2009
14:15 EET

OFI	0–1	PAOK
	Report	Papazoglou 40'

Theodoros Vardinogiannis Stadium, Heraklion
Attendance: 7,500
Referee: Konstantinos Papastamatis (Athens)

27 October 2009
15:15 EET

Kalamata	0–3	PAS Giannina
	Report	Dimbala 15'; Sialmas 22'; Michalopoulos 61'

Kalamata Municipal Stadium, Kalamata
Referee: Athanasios Giachos (Chios)

28 October 2009
14:15 EET

Agrotikos Asteras	0–3	Kavala
	Report	Ioannou 4'; Onwuachi 81', 85'

Agrotikos Asteras Stadium, Thessaloniki
Referee: Christos Mitsios (Epirus)

28 October 2009
14:15 EET

Visaltiakos	0–0 (a.e.t.)	Atromitos
	Report
Penalties
Roumpos (penalty scored); Eleftheriadis (penalty missed); Pechlivanidis (penalty scored); Paschaloudis (penalty scored); Koukoulis (penalty scored)	4–5	(penalty scored) Perrone; (penalty scored) Brito; (penalty scored) Michailidis; (penalty scored) Nebegleras; (penalty scored) Kampas

Nigrita Stadium, Nigrita
Referee: Praxitelis Zachariadis (Macedonia)

28 October 2009
14:15 EET

Ethnikos Piraeus	1–2	Skoda Xanthi
Rodrigo 71'	Report	Quintana 17'; Souanis 90+3'

Hellinikon Stadium, Elliniko
Referee: Anastasios Sidiropoulos (Dodecanese)

28 October 2009
17:00 EET

Olympiacos Volos	2–1	AEL
Martins 5'; Umbides 90+3'	Report	Kakaras 41' (o.g.)

Volos Municipal Stadium, Volos
Referee: Michalis Dakos (Xanthi)

28 October 2009
14:15 EET

Ionikos	1–2	Levadiakos
Furtado 2'	Report	Taralidis 19'; Balvorín 63'

Neapoli Stadium, Nikaia
Referee: Stavros Mantalos (Athens)

28 October 2009
14:15 EET

Kallithea	1–0	Panthrakikos
Papanastasiou 89'	Report

Grigoris Lambrakis Stadium, Kallithea
Referee: Petros Konstantineas (Messinia)

27 October 2009
19:00 EET

Egaleo	0–3	Asteras Tripolis
	Report	Cesarec 30'; Bastía 40'; Udoji 52'

Stavros Mavrothalassitis Stadium, Aigaleo
Referee: Anastasios Kakos (Corfu)

28 October 2009
14:15 EET

Pierikos	2–2 (a.e.t.)	Ergotelis
Tasidis 53'; Gougoulias 108'	Report	Leal 90+2'; Shashiashvili 105'
Penalties
Gougoulias (penalty missed); Penta (penalty scored); Martínez (penalty scored); Makris (penalty scored); Giazitzoglou (penalty scored)	4–2	(penalty missed) Beto; (penalty scored) Leal; (penalty scored) Fragoulakis; (penalty missed) Romano

Katerini Stadium, Katerini
Referee: Michalis Tsiniaris (Athens)

27 October 2009
15:15 EET

Panetolikos	0–0 (a.e.t.)	Panionios
	Report
Penalties
Stojanović (penalty scored); Mumin (penalty scored); Vuković (penalty scored); Dentsas (penalty missed); Zouroudis (penalty scored); Mörec (penalty scored); Baykara (penalty scored); Belevonis (penalty scored); Anastasiadis (penalty missed)	7–8	(penalty scored) Casteglione; (penalty scored) Maniatis; (penalty scored) Estoyanoff; (penalty missed) Kumordzi; (penalty scored) Riera; (penalty scored) Anastasopoulos; (penalty scored) Skoufalis; (penalty scored) Tzavellas; (penalty scored) Omo

Panetolikos Stadium, Agrinio
Attendance: 6,000
Referee: Andreas Pappas (Athens)

29 October 2009
17:00 EET

Trikala	1–0	Iraklis
Savvidis 17'	Report

Trikala Municipal Stadium, Trikala
Referee: Georgios Stathopoulos (Achaea)

28 October 2009
18:00 EET

Aspropyrgos	3–4	Aris
Prittas 10' (o.g.); Xydis 22', 68'	Report	García 16'; Abreu 60', 83'; Javito 78'

Aspropyrgos Municipal Stadium, Aspropyrgos
Referee: Michalis Voskakis (Rethymnο)

29 October 2009
17:00 EET

Thrasyvoulos	1–0 (a.e.t.)	AEK Athens
Karamalikis 105'	Report

Fyli Municipal Stadium, Fyli
Attendance: 350
Referee: Stavros Tritsonis (Athens)

== Round of 16 ==
The draw took place on 2 November 2009.

=== Summary ===
Team 1	Score	Team 2
Atromitos	0–1 (a.e.t.)	PAS Giannina
Kallithea	1–1 (4–3 p)	Trikala
Aris	2–0	Asteras Tripolis
Panserraikos	0–2	PAOK
Skoda Xanthi	2–0	Olympiacos Volos
Panathinaikos	2–1	Pierikos
Levadiakos	0–0 (2–4 p)	Kavala
Thrasyvoulos	0–1	Panionios

=== Matches ===
20 January 2010
17:00 EET

Atromitos	0–1 (a.e.t.)	PAS Giannina
	Report	Mendrinos 96'

Peristeri Stadium, Peristeri
Attendance: 1,007
Referee: Apostolos Abarkiolis (Macedonia)

13 January 2010
17:00 EET

Kallithea	1–1 (a.e.t.)	Trikala
Tchana 23'	Report	Diamantis 83'
Penalties
Fountoukidis (penalty missed); Arkoudas (penalty scored); Zouboulakis (penalty scored); Karadimos (penalty missed); Koutroumpis (penalty scored); Iraklis (penalty scored)	4–3	(penalty scored) Maistrellis; (penalty missed) Provatidis; (penalty missed) Liosatos; (penalty scored) Manousakis; (penalty scored) Chaniotis; (penalty missed) Karras

Grigoris Lambrakis Stadium, Kallithea
Referee: Chrysovalantis Vrakas (Euboea)

13 January 2010
17:00 EET

Aris	2–0	Asteras Tripolis
Cámpora 32'; Calvo 81'	Report

Kleanthis Vikelidis Stadium, Thessaloniki
Referee: Konstantinos Papastamatis (Athens)

20 January 2010
17:00 EET

Panserraikos	0–2	PAOK
	Report	Lino 14'; Papazoglou 74'

Serres Municipal Stadium, Serres
Referee: Giorgos Stathopoulos (Achaia)

20 January 2010
17:00 EET

Skoda Xanthi	2–0	Olympiacos Volos
Marcelinho 25'; Buga 82'	Report

Skoda Xanthi Arena, Xanthi
Attendance: 414
Referee: Dimitrios Kyrkos (Epirus)

13 January 2010
17:00 EET

Panathinaikos	2–1	Pierikos
Cleyton 14', 90'	Report	Konteon 40'

Olympic Stadium, Marousi
Attendance: 6,159
Referee: Athanasios Giachos (Chios)

13 January 2010
17:00 EET

Levadiakos	0–0 (a.e.t.)	Kavala
	Report
Penalties
Barkoglou (penalty scored); González (penalty missed); Begoña (penalty scored); Sérginho (penalty missed)	2–4	(penalty scored) Rincón; (penalty scored) Psomas; (penalty scored) Pavićević; (penalty scored) Oruma

Levadia Municipal Stadium, Levadia
Referee: Michael Koukoulakis (Heraklion)

20 January 2010
17:00 EET

Thrasyvoulos	0–1	Panionios
	Report	Balaban 90+2'

Fyli Municipal Stadium, Fyli
Attendance: 780
Referee: Praxitelis Zachariadis (Macedonia)

== Quarter-finals ==
The draw took place on 22 January 2010.

=== Summary ===
Team 1	Score/Agg.	Team 2	Match	Replay
PAS Giannina	4–0	PAOK		
Skoda Xanthi	1–4	Aris	1–1	0–3
Panathinaikos	2–0	Kallithea		
Kavala	2–1	Panionios	0–0	2–1 (a.e.t.)

=== Matches ===
2 February 2010
17:00 EET

PAS Giannina	4–0	PAOK
Dimbala 8', 81'; Kousas 24'; Sznaucner 43' (o.g.)	Report

Zosimades Stadium, Ioannina
Referee: Vasilis Paboridis (Kilkis)

10 February 2010
17:00 EET

Skoda Xanthi	1–1	Aris
Stângă 70'	Report	Neto 90+4'

Skoda Xanthi Arena, Xanthi
Attendance: 692
Referee: Giorgos Daloukas (Thessaly)

3 February 2010
17:00 EET

Panathinaikos	2–0	Kallithea
Salpingidis 52'; Arkoudas 88' (o.g.)	Report

Olympic Stadium, Marousi
Attendance: 5,058
Referee: Christos Mitsios (Epirus)

10 February 2010^{*}
17:00 EET

Kavala	0–0	Panionios
	Report

Kavala Stadium, Kavala
Referee: Michalis Dakos (Xanthi)

^{*}The match was interrupted at the 69th minute due to the bad condition of field, that occurred from continuous raining. The match continued from minute that had been stopped, the following day.

==== Replay ====
17 February 2010
17:00 EET

Aris	3–0	Skoda Xanthi
Cámpora 17'; Adu 22'; Koke 65'	Report

Kleanthis Vikelidis Stadium, Thessaloniki
Attendance: 10,680
Referee: Giorgos Stathopoulos (Achaea)

17 February 2010
17:00 EET

Panionios	1–2 (a.e.t.)	Kavala
Riera 47'	Report	Dobrasinović 84'; Onwuachi 97'

Nea Smyrni Stadium, Nea Smyrni
Attendance: 2,164
Referee: Vasilis Paboridis (Kilkis)

== Semi-finals ==
The draw took place on 22 January 2010, after the quarter-final draw.

=== Summary ===
Team 1	Agg.	Team 2	1st leg	2nd leg
Panathinaikos	3–1	PAS Giannina	3–1	0–0
Aris	4–2	Kavala	3–1	1–1

=== Matches ===
24 March 2010
17:00 EET

Panathinaikos	3–1	PAS Giannina
Kotsios 14' (o.g.); Ninis 45'; Cissé 85'	Report	Kousas 90'

Olympic Stadium, Marousi
Attendance: 6,695
Referee: Giorgos Stathopoulos (Achaea)
7 April 2010
17:00 EEST

PAS Giannina	0–0	Panathinaikos
	Report

Zosimades Stadium, Ioannina
Attendance: 5,566
Referee: Stavros Tritsonis (Athens)

Panathinaikos won 3–1 on aggregate.

17 March 2010
17:00 EET

Aris	3–1	Kavala
Koke 26' (pen.), 68'; Javito 84'	Report	Onwuachi 45'

Kleanthis Vikelidis Stadium, Thessaloniki
Attendance: 11,497
Referee: Anastasios Kakos (Corfu)
25 March 2010
17:00 EET

Kavala	1–1	Aris
Dié 55'	Report	Koke 44'

Kavala Stadium, Kavala
Referee: Giorgos Daloukas (Thessaly)

Aris won 4–2 on aggregate.

== Final ==
24 April 2010
20:30 EEST

Panathinaikos	1–0	Aris
Leto 63'	Report

Olympic Stadium, Marousi
Attendance: 48,926
Referee: Anastasios Kakos (Corfu)

== Top scorers ==
Rank	Player	Club	Goals
1	(Greece) Pavlos Leptokaridis	PAONE	4
1	(Nigeria) Benjamin Onwuachi	Κavala	4
1	(Spain) Sergio Koke	Aris	4
4	(Democratic Republic of the Congo) Patrick Dimbala	PAS Giannina	3
5	(Spain) Ernesto Gómez	Niki Volos	2
5	(Romania) Bogdan Aldea	Anagennisi Giannitsa	2
5	(Argentina) Sebastián Abreu	Aris	2
5	(Greece) Ioulios Labrinatos	Chaidari	2
5	(Greece) Panagiotis Bekiaris	Agrotikos Asteras	2
5	(Greece) Nikos Skarmoutsos	Korinthos	2
5	(France) Kendal Ucar	Ethnikos Asteras	2
5	(Croatia) Ante Rukavina	Panathinaikos	2
5	(Greece) Dimitrios Drakos	Platanias	2
5	(Greece) Konstantinos Pangalos	Platanias	2
5	(Argentina) Javier Umbides	Olympiacos Volos	2
5	(Greece) Petros Konteon	Pierikos / Olympiacos Volos	2
5	(Greece) Georgios Xydis	Atromitos	2
5	(Greece) Thanasis Papazoglou	PAOK	2
5	(Brazil) Cleyton	Panathinaikos	2
5	(Brazil) Rogério Martins	Olympiacos Volos	2
5	(Greece) Anastasios Karamanos	Aspropyrgos	2
5	(Greece) Giorgos Zacharopoulos	Aspropyrgos	2
5	(Greece) Christos Chatzipantelidis	Thrasyvoulos	2
5	(Greece) Sotiris Ninis	Panathinaikos	2
5	(Greece) Georgios Kousas	PAS Giannina	2
5	(Argentina) Javier Cámpora	Aris	2
5	(Spain) Javito	Aris	2
