= 2007–08 Greek Football Cup =

2007–08 Greek Cup
Tournament details
- Country: Greece
- Teams: 69

Final positions
- Champions: Olympiacos (23rd title)
- Runners-up: Aris

Tournament statistics
- Matches played: 75
- Goals scored: 186 (2.48 per match)
- Top goal scorer(s): Giorgos Zacharopoulos (5 goals)

The 2007–08 Greek Football Cup was the 66th edition of the Greek Football Cup. 69 club entries were accepted for the competition. The competition culminated with the Greek Football Cup Final, held at Kaftanzoglio Stadium, on 17 May 2008. The match was contested by Olympiacos and Aris, with Olympiacos winning by 2–0.

== Calendar ==
| Round | Date(s) | Fixtures | Clubs | New entries | Leagues entering |
|---|---|---|---|---|---|
| First Round | 1, 2, 5 September 2007 | 17 | 69 → 52 | 35 | Gamma Ethniki |
| Second Round | 8, 9 September 2007 | 18 | 52 → 34 | 18 | Beta Ethniki |
| Additional Round | 26 September 2007 | 2 | 34 → 32 | none | none |
| Round of 32 | 9–11, 30, 31 October, 1 November & 5 December 2007 | 16 | 32 → 16 | 16 | Super League |
| Round of 16 | 9, 16 January 2008 | 9 | 16 → 8 | none | none |
| Quarter-finals | 27, 28 February & 5, 19, 20 March 2008 | 8 | 8 → 4 | none | none |
| Semi-finals | 2, 16 April 2008 | 4 | 4 → 2 | none | none |
| Final | 17 May 2008 | 1 | 2 → 1 | none | none |

== Knockout phase ==
Each tie in the knockout phase, apart from the quarter-finals and the semi-finals, was played by a single match. If the score was level at the end of normal time, extra time was played, followed by a penalty shoot-out if the score was still level. In the quarter-finals and the semi-finals were played over two legs, with each team playing one leg at home. The team that scored more goals on aggregate over the two legs advanced to the next round. If the aggregate score was level, the away goals rule was applied, i.e. the team that scored more goals away from home over the two legs advanced. If away goals were also equal, then extra time was played. The away goals rule was again applied after extra time, i.e. if there were goals scored during extra time and the aggregate score was still level, the visiting team advanced by virtue of more away goals scored. If no goals were scored during extra time, the winners were decided by a penalty shoot-out. In the round of 16, if the score was level at the end of normal time the two-legged rule was applied.
The mechanism of the draws for each round is as follows:

- In the draw for the second round, the teams from the second division are seeded and the winners from the first round were unseeded. The seeded teams are drawn against the unseeded teams.
- In the draw for the Round of 32 onwards, the teams from the first division are seeded and the winners from the previous rounds were unseeded. The seeded teams are drawn against the unseeded teams.
- In the draws for the Round of 16 onwards, there are no seedings and teams from the different group can be drawn against each other.

== First round ==
The draw took place on 20 August 2007.

=== Summary ===
| Team 1 | Score | Team 2 |
|---|---|---|
1 September 2007
| Niki Volos | 2–1 | Acharnaikos |
| Anagennisi Giannitsa | 0–0 (2–4 p) | Preveza |
| Aiolikos | 0–0 (4–5 p) | Ilioupoli |
| Atsalenios | 1–0 | Doxa Drama |
| Fostiras | 5–1 | Thiva |
| Neos Asteras Rethymno | 0–2 | Messiniakos |
| Diagoras | 3–0 | Thyella Patra |
2 September 2007
| Eordaikos 2007 | 2–1 | Anagennisi Karditsa |
| Lamia | 1–1 (3–4 p) | PAONE |
| Thraki Enosi | 1–0 | AE Giannena |
| Polykastro | 1–0 (a.e.t.) | Vyzas Megara |
| Olympiacos Volos | 2–0 (a.e.t.) | Panachaiki 2005 |
| Anagennisi Arta | 4–0 | Panegialios |
| Korinthos | 0–0 (4–1 p) | Koropi |
| Ethnikos Katerini | 0–0 (4–1 p) | Kavala |
| Prosotsani | 1–2 | Thermaikos Thermis |
5 September 2007
| Aias Salamina | 2–1 | Rodos |
N/A
| Panetolikos | bye | |

=== Matches ===
1 September 2007
13:00 EEST

| Niki Volos | 2–1 | Acharnaikos |
|---|---|---|
| Chatzipantelidis 43' (pen.); Koutsogiannis 56' | Report | Papoulis 36' (pen.) |

Panthessaliko Stadium, Volos
Attendance: 350
Referee: Alexandros Aretopoulos (Trikala)

1 September 2007
13:00 EEST

| Anagennisi Giannitsa | 0–0 (a.e.t.) | Preveza |
|---|---|---|
| | Report |
Penalties
| | 2–4 |

Giannitsa Municipal Stadium, Giannitsa
Attendance: 100
Referee: Stavros Zabetakis (Thessaloniki)

1 September 2007
13:00 EEST

| Aiolikos | 0–0 (a.e.t.) | Ilioupoli |
|---|---|---|
| | Report |
Penalties
| | 4–5 |

Mytilene Municipal Stadium, Mytilene
Attendance: 265
Referee: Stefanos Mantakis (Imathia)

1 September 2007
13:00 EEST

| Atsalenios | 1–0 | Doxa Drama |
|---|---|---|
| Ebus 41' | Report |

Atsalenios Stadium, Heraklion
Attendance: 151
Referee: Georgios Karalakis (Lasithi)

1 September 2007
13:00 EEST

| Fostiras | 5–1 | Thiva |
|---|---|---|
| Zacharopoulos 4', 72', 90+1'; Petrov 53'; Kiassos 75' | Report | Zonas 18' |

Tavros Stadium, Tavros
Attendance: 236
Referee: Pantelis Chondropoulos (Corinthia)

1 September 2007
13:00 EEST

| Neos Asteras Rethymno | 0–2 | Messiniakos |
|---|---|---|
| | Report | Argyropoulos 38'; Sismanidis 52' |

Sochora Stadium, Rethymno
Attendance: 100
Referee: Georgios Foukakis (Heraklion)

1 September 2007
13:00 EEST

| Diagoras | 3–0 | Thyella Patra |
|---|---|---|
| Giannakidis 29'; Spartalis 72', 86' | Report |

Diagoras Stadium, Rhodes
Attendance: 154
Referee: Evgenia Kaskantiri (Athens)

2 September 2007
13:00 EEST

| Eordaikos 2007 | 2–1 | Anagennisi Karditsa |
|---|---|---|
| Veletanis 59'; Tsalikis 79' | Report | Papamargaritis 30' |

[Emilios Theofanidis Stadium, Ptolemaida
Attendance: 275
Referee: Grigoris Frantzeskos (Thessaloniki)

2 September 2007
13:00 EEST

| Lamia | 1–1 (a.e.t.) | PAONE |
|---|---|---|
| Picciolo 49' | Report | Seretis 68' |
Penalties
| | 3–4 |

Lamia Municipal Stadium, Lamia
Attendance: 406
Referee: Anastasios Papapetrou (Athens)

2 September 2007
13:00 EEST

| Thraki Enosi | 1–0 | AE Giannena |
|---|---|---|
| Nikolaidis 22' | Report |

Fotis Kosmas Stadium, Alexandroupolis
Attendance: 322
Referee: Christos Fragakis (Kavala)

2 September 2007
13:00 EEST

| Polykastro | 1–0 (a.e.t.) | Vyzas Megara |
|---|---|---|
| Papazoudis 98' | Report |

Polykastro Stadium, Polykastro
Attendance: 159
Referee: Giannis Papoutsis (Serres)

2 September 2007
13:00 EEST

| Olympiacos Volos | 2–0 (a.e.t.) | Panachaiki 2005 |
|---|---|---|
| Jelovac 112', 119' | Report |

Volos Municipal Stadium, Volos
Attendance: 233
Referee: Panagiotis Gavrilis (Athens)

2 September 2007
13:00 EEST

| Anagennisi Arta | 4–0 | Panegialios |
|---|---|---|
| Balafas 64'; Themelis 65' (pen.); Goulas 72'; Kokolis 84' | Report |

Arta Stadium, Arta
Attendance: 300
Referee: Alexandros Katsikogiannis (Epirus)

2 September 2007
13:00 EEST

| Korinthos | 0–0 (a.e.t.) | Koropi |
|---|---|---|
| | Report |
Penalties
| | 4–1 |

Korinthos Stadium, Corinth
Attendance: 450
Referee: Anastasios Papandriopoulos (Piraeus)

2 September 2007
13:00 EEST

| Ethnikos Katerini | 0–0 (a.e.t.) | Kavala |
|---|---|---|
| | Report |
Penalties
| | 4–1 |

Kalianidis Stadium, Katerini
Attendance: 176
Referee: Nikos Tevekelis (Macedonia)

2 September 2007
13:00 EEST

| Prosotsani | 1–2 (a.e.t.) | Thermaikos Thermis |
|---|---|---|
| Kyriakidis 79' | Report | Diamantopoulos 78', 109' |

Municipal Stadium of Prosotsani, Drama
Attendance: 344
Referee: Stratos Skoupras (Kilkis)

5 September 2007
13:00 EEST

| Aias Salamina | 2–1 | Rodos |
|---|---|---|
| Romańczuk 11' (pen.); Skartsilas 48' | Report | Garrasino 88' |

Municipal Stadium of Salamina, Salamina
Attendance: 506
Referee: Stefanos Mantakis (Athens)

== Second round ==
The draw took place on 20 August 2007, after the First Round draw.

=== Summary ===
| Team 1 | Score | Team 2 |
|---|---|---|
8 September 2007
| Atsalenios | 1–0 | Panthrakikos |
| Messiniakos | 0–0 (4–3 p) | Panserraikos |
| Diagoras | 2–0 | Chaidari |
| Ethnikos Katerini | 1–0 | Kerkyra |
| Niki Volos | 0–2 | Egaleo |
| PAONE | 1–2 (a.e.t.) | Thrasyvoulos |
9 September 2007
| Ilioupoli | 1–0 | Pierikos |
| Thraki Enosi | 1–2 | ASK Olympiacos |
| Fostiras | 2–1 | PAS Giannena |
| Polykastro | 2–4 (a.e.t.) | Agrotikos Asteras |
| Olympiacos Volos | 3–1 (a.e.t.) | Ilisiakos |
| Anagennisi Arta | 3–4 | Ethnikos Asteras |
| Korinthos | 1–2 | Agios Dimitrios |
| Thermaikos Thermis | 1–2 (a.e.t.) | Kastoria |
| Panetolikos | 4–0 | Ionikos |
| Eordaikos 2007 | 0–2 | Kallithea |
| Aias Salamina | 0–2 | Ethnikos Piraeus |
| Preveza | 0–0 (4–2 p) | Kalamata |

=== Matches ===
8 September 2007
13:00 EEST

| Atsalenios | 1–0 | Panthrakikos |
|---|---|---|
| Argentis 24' | Report |

Atsalenios Stadium, Heraklion
Attendance: 203
Referee: Michalis Tsiniaris (Athens)

8 September 2007
13:00 EEST

| Messiniakos | 0–0 (a.e.t.) | Panserraikos |
|---|---|---|
| | Report |
Penalties
| | 4–3 |

Messiniakos Stadium, Kalamata
Attendance: 284
Referee: Georgios Giannopoulos (Athens)

8 September 2007
13:00 EEST

| Diagoras | 2–0 | Chaidari |
|---|---|---|
| Papapostolou 10'; Triantafyllou 59' | Report |

Diagoras Stadium, Rhodes
Attendance: 328
Referee: Konstantinos Ioannidis (Piraeus)

8 September 2007
13:00 EEST

| Ethnikos Katerini | 1–0 | Kerkyra |
|---|---|---|
| Papavasiliou 82' | Report |

Kalianidis Stadium, Katerini
Attendance: 137
Referee: Georgios Tzovaras (Phthiotis)

8 September 2007
13:00 EEST

| Niki Volos | 0–2 | Egaleo |
|---|---|---|
| | Report | Tournas 23'; Michelis 36' |

Panthessaliko Stadium, Volos
Attendance: 659
Referee: Apostolos Ambarkiolis (Thessaloniki)

8 September 2007
13:00 EEST

| PAONE | 1–2 (a.e.t.) | Thrasyvoulos |
|---|---|---|
| Tzimogiannis 24' | Report | Sotirhos 82'; Manikas 94' |

Neoi Epivates Stadium, Neoi Epivates
Attendance: 193
Referee: Symeon Spyrou (Kastoria)

9 September 2007
13:00 EEST

| Ilioupoli | 1–0 | Pierikos |
|---|---|---|
| Kyparissis 3' | Report |

Ilioupoli Municipal Stadium, Ilioupoli
Attendance: 539
Referee: Ioannis Delfakis (Arcadia)

9 September 2007
13:00 EEST

| Thraki Enosi | 1–2 | ASK Olympiacos |
|---|---|---|
| Hajduczek 17' (o.g.) | Report | Pakaltsis 41'; Giakakoglou 90' |

Fotis Kosmas Stadium, Alexandroupolis
Attendance: 426
Referee: Ioannis Kementsetsidis (Kilkis)

9 September 2007
13:00 EEST

| Fostiras | 2–1 | PAS Giannina |
|---|---|---|
| Maragoudakis 21'; Zacharopoulos 45+1' | Report | Saitiotis 4' (pen.) |

Tavros Stadium, Tavros
Attendance: 1,251
Referee: Nikitas Datis (Chios)

9 September 2007
13:00 EEST

| Polykastro | 2–4 (a.e.t.) | Agrotikos Asteras |
|---|---|---|
| Antonakis 37'; Gerontidis 62' | Report | Soultanidis 46', 108'; Kyzeridis 90'; Arzoumanidis 98' |

Polykastro Stadium, Polykastro
Attendance: 358
Referee: Angelos Daoultzis (Serres)

9 September 2007
13:00 EEST

| Olympiacos Volos | 3–1 (a.e.t.) | Ilisiakos |
|---|---|---|
| Makris 24'; Tsatsalidis 91'; Jelovac 116' | Report | Kampas 33' |

Volos Municipal Stadium, Volos
Attendance: 294
Referee: Georgios Chatzis (West Attica)

9 September 2007
13:00 EEST

| Anagennisi Arta | 3–4 | Ethnikos Asteras |
|---|---|---|
| Triantos 17'; Kokolis 47'; Themelis 74' | Report | Beniskos 5', 26'; Archontoulis 29'; Barcelo 55' |

Arta Stadium, Arta
Attendance: 738
Referee: Panagiotis Karagounias (Achaea)

9 September 2007
13:00 EEST

| Korinthos | 1–2 | Agios Dimitrios |
|---|---|---|
| Klokidis 76' (pen.) | Report | Giannitsanakis 11'; Sapanis 28' |

Korinthos Stadium, Corinth
Attendance: 671
Referee: Petros Konstantineas (Messinia)

9 September 2007
13:00 EEST

| Thermaikos Thermis | 1–2 (a.e.t.) | Kastoria |
|---|---|---|
| Klokidis 76' (pen.) | Report | Giannitsanakis 11'; Sapanis 28' |

Thermi Stadium, Thermi
Attendance: 316
Referee: Michalis Dakos (Xanthi)

9 September 2007
13:00 EEST

| Panetolikos | 4–0 | Ionikos |
|---|---|---|
| Naidos 12'; Zorbas 30'; Bousinakis 43'; Dentsas 53' | Report |

Panetolikos Stadium, Agrinio
Attendance: 2,670
Referee: Christos Mitsios (Epirus)

9 September 2007
13:00 EEST

| Eordaikos 2007 | 0–2 | Kallithea |
|---|---|---|
| | Report | Georgiev 20' (pen.); Karadimos 45' |

[Emilios Theofanidis Stadium, Ptolemaida
Attendance: 468
Referee: Georgios Kastanidis (Thessaloniki)

9 September 2007
13:00 EEST

| Aias Salamina | 0–2 | Ethnikos Piraeus |
|---|---|---|
| | Report | Jerez 17'; Gjoševski 44' |

Municipal Stadium of Salamina, Salamina
Attendance: 1,500
Referee: Nikos Athanasiou (Thesprotia)

9 September 2007
13:00 EEST

| Preveza | 0–0 (a.e.t.) | Kalamata |
|---|---|---|
| | Report |
Penalties
| | 4–2 |

Athanasia Tsoumeleka Stadium, Preveza
Attendance: 673
Referee: Thomas Kouklomenos (Larissa)

== Additional round ==
=== Summary ===
| Team 1 | Score | Team 2 |
|---|---|---|
26 September 2007
| Panetolikos | 1–2 | Fostiras |
| Messiniakos | 3–0 | Atsalenios |

=== Matches ===
26 September 2007
13:00 EEST

| Panetolikos | 1–2 | Fostiras |
|---|---|---|
| Szabó 56' (pen.) | Report | Maragoudakis 36'; Zacharopoulos 56' |

Panetolikos Stadium, Agrinio
Attendance: 1,529
Referee: Nikolaos Anousos (Laconia)

26 September 2007
13:00 EEST

| Messiniakos | 3–0 | Atsalenios |
|---|---|---|
| Zé Carlos 13'; Athanasopoulos 44' (pen.); Argyropoulos 76' | Report |

Messiniakos Stadium, Kalamata
Attendance: 115
Referee: Aristidis Tsichlis (Athens)

== Bracket ==
Round of 32
Thrasyvoulos | 4
PAOK | 2
Preveza (w/o) | 3
Veria | 0
Kallithea | 1
Apollon Kalamarias | 2
Ilioupoli | 0
AEL | 4
Diagoras | 1
Olympiacos | 2
Ethnikos Asteras | 1
Panathinaikos | 3
Olympiacos Volos | 0
Iraklis | 1
Kastoria | 2
Panionios | 3
Egaleo | 1
Skoda Xanthi | 2
Fostiras | 0
AEK Athens | 2
Ethnikos Katerini | 1
Levadiakos | 0
Agios Dimitrios | 0
Aris (a.e.t.) | 1
Messiniakos | 0
Asteras Tripolis | 2
ASK Olympiacos | 1(5)
Atromitos (p) | 1(6)
Agrotikos Asteras | 1
Ergotelis | 0
Ethnikos Piraeus | 1
OFI (a.e.t.) | 2

Round of 16
Thrasyvoulos | 3
Preveza | 0
Apollon Kalamarias | 1
AEL | 2
Olympiacos | 4
Panathinaikos | 0
Iraklis | 1
Panionios | 0
Skoda Xanthi | 2
AEK Athens | 0
Ethnikos Katerini | 0
Aris | 3
Asteras Tripolis | 0
Atromitos | 1
Agrotikos Asteras | 1 | 0 | 1
OFI | 1 | 5 | 6

Quarter-finals
Thrasyvoulos | 1 | 3 | 4
AEL | 0 | 1 | 1
Olympiacos | 2 | 2 | 4
Iraklis | 0 | 2 | 2
Skoda Xanthi | 0 | 0 | 0
Aris | 0 | 1 | 1
Atromitos | 3 | 1 | 4
OFI | 1 | 2 | 3

Semi-finals
Thrasyvoulos | 2 | 1 | 3
Olympiacos | 3 | 3 | 6
Aris | 1 | 2 | 3
Atromitos | 0 | 1 | 1

Final
Olympiacos | 2
Aris | 0

== Round of 32 ==
The draw took place on 20 August 2007.

=== Summary ===
| Team 1 | Score | Team 2 |
|---|---|---|
| Ethnikos Piraeus | 1–2 (a.e.t.) | OFI |
| Preveza | 3–0 (w/o) | Veria |
| Ilioupoli | 0–4 | AEL |
| Olympiacos Volos | 0–1 | Iraklis |
| Ethnikos Asteras | 1–3 | Panathinaikos |
| Agios Dimitrios | 0–1 (a.e.t.) | Aris |
| Ethnikos Katerini | 1–0 | Levadiakos |
| Kastoria | 2–3 | Panionios |
| Kallithea | 1–2 | Apollon Kalamarias |
| Egaleo | 1–2 | Skoda Xanthi |
| Thrasyvoulos | 4–2 | PAOK |
| ASK Olympiacos | 1–1 (5–6 p) | Atromitos |
| Agrotikos Asteras | 1–0 | Ergotelis |
| Diagoras | 1–2 | Olympiacos |
| Fostiras | 0–2 | AEK Athens |
| Messiniakos | 0–2 | Asteras Tripolis |

=== Matches ===
1 November 2007
16:45 EET

| Ethnikos Piraeus | 1–2 (a.e.t.) | OFI |
|---|---|---|
| Matejić 90+2' | Report | Popović 66', 119' (pen.) |

Hellinikon Olympic Complex, Elliniko
Attendance: 591
Referee: Stavros Tritsonis (Athens)

10 October 2007
13:30 EEST

| Preveza | 3–0 (Awarded) | Veria |
|---|---|---|
| Milionis 15' | Report | Bykowski 17'; Julinho 80' |

Athanasia Tsoumeleka Stadium, Preveza
Attendance: 463
Referee: Vasilios Argyropoulos (Kastoria)

Veria won the match by 1–2, but eventually forfeited due to breaching of the rules.

11 October 2007
13:30 EEST

| Ilioupoli | 0–4 | AEL |
|---|---|---|
| | Report | Bakayoko 53'; Kožlej 68'; Lampropoulos 71'; Parra 85' |

Ilioupoli Municipal Stadium, Ilioupoli
Attendance: 412
Referee: Iraklis Tsikinis (Messinia)

30 October 2007
16:45 EET

| Olympiacos Volos | 0–1 | Iraklis |
|---|---|---|
| | Report | Chloros 77' |

Volos Municipal Stadium, Volos
Attendance: 713
Referee: Vasilios Pamporidis (Kilkis)

31 October 2007
17:45 EET

| Ethnikos Asteras | 1–3 | Panathinaikos |
|---|---|---|
| Beniskos 66' | Report | N'Doye 20'; Mantzios 25', 49' |

Michalis Kritikopoulos Stadium, Kaisariani
Attendance: 2,017
Referee: Dimitrios Kalopoulos (Macedonia)

11 October 2007
14:45 EEST

| Agios Dimitrios | 0–1 (a.e.t.) | Aris |
|---|---|---|
| | Report | Kyriakos 119' |

Agios Dimitrios Municipal Stadium, Agios Dimitrios
Attendance: 417
Referee: Ilias Spathas (Piraeus)

10 October 2007
15:00 EEST

| Ethnikos Katerini | 1–0 | Levadiakos |
|---|---|---|
| Papavasiliou 66' | Report |

Kalianidis Stadium, Katerini
Attendance: 194
Referee: Lazaros Polatian (Pella)

31 October 2007
14:00 EET

| Kastoria | 2–3 | Panionios |
|---|---|---|
| Stefanidis 53', 85' | Report | Aravidis 6'; Koutsopoulos 13'; Sialmas 51' |

Municipal Stadium of Kastoria, Kastoria
Attendance: 123
Referee: Anastasios Kakos (Corfu)

9 October 2007
15:45 EEST

| Kallithea | 1–2 | Apollon Kalamarias |
|---|---|---|
| Kenedy 35' (pen.) | Report | Perrone 45'; Galanopoulos 80' (pen.) |

Grigoris Lambrakis Stadium, Kallithea
Attendance: 381
Referee: Ilias Mazarakos (Arta)

10 October 2007
15:45 EEST

| Egaleo | 1–2 | Skoda Xanthi |
|---|---|---|
| Petropoulos 89' | Report | Labriakos 25'; Barkoglou 63' |

Stavros Mavrothalassitis Stadium, Aigaleo
Attendance: 171
Referee: Dimitrios Kyrkos (Epirus)

10 October 2007
13:30 EEST

| Thrasyvoulos | 4–2 | PAOK |
|---|---|---|
| Rokas 3'; Liapakis 16'; Poulakos 54'; Katsikis 90' | Report | Christodoulopoulos 67'; Salmon 88' |

Fyli Municipal Stadium, Fyli
Attendance: 534
Referee: Michael Koukoulakis (Heraklion)

10 October 2007
13:30 EEST

| ASK Olympiacos | 1–1 | Atromitos |
|---|---|---|
| Katsaros 13' (pen.) | Report | Cirio 47' |
Penalties
| | 5–6 |

Panthessaliko Stadium, Volos
Attendance: 243
Referee: Giannis Stavridis (Pieria)

11 October 2007
13:30 EEST

| Agrotikos Asteras | 1–0 | Ergotelis |
|---|---|---|
| Soultanidis 53' | Report |

Agrotikos Asteras Stadium, Thessaloniki
Attendance: 363
Referee: Nathanail Charalampidis (Kavala)

5 December 2007
17:45 EET

| Diagoras | 1–2 | Olympiacos |
|---|---|---|
| Triantafyllou 59' (pen.) | Report | Mitroglou 66', 89' |

Diagoras Stadium, Rhodes
Attendance: 3,700
Referee: Michalis Germanakos (Athens)

1 November 2007
17:45 EET

| Fostiras | 0–2 | AEK Athens |
|---|---|---|
| | Report | Júlio César 59'; Kapetanos 86' |

Tavros Stadium, Tavros
Attendance: 2,545
Referee: Christoforos Zografos (Athens)

11 October 2007
13:30 EEST

| Messiniakos | 0–2 | Asteras Tripolis |
|---|---|---|
| | Report | Filomeno 46', 80' |

Messiniakos Stadium, Kalamata
Attendance: 336
Referee: Konstantinos Papastamatis (Athens)

== Round of 16 ==
The draw took place on 13 December 2007.

=== Summary ===
| Team 1 | Score/Agg. | Team 2 | Match | Replay |
|---|---|---|---|---|
| Thrasyvoulos | 3–0 | Preveza | | |
| Ethnikos Katerini | 0–3 | Aris | | |
| Iraklis | 1–0 | Panionios | | |
| Apollon Kalamarias | 1–2 | AEL | | |
| Olympiacos | 4–0 | Panathinaikos | | |
| Asteras Tripolis | 0–1 | Atromitos | | |
| Agrotikos Asteras | 1–6 | OFI | 1–1 | 0–5 |
| Skoda Xanthi | 2–0 | AEK Athens | | |

=== Matches ===
9 January 2008
15:00 EET

| Thrasyvoulos | 3–0 | Preveza |
|---|---|---|
| Barrientos 33'; Katsikis 63'; Anastasakos 72' | Report |

Fyli Municipal Stadium, Fyli
Attendance: 252
Referee: Georgios Stathopoulos (Achaea)

9 January 2008
16:45 EET

| Ethnikos Katerini | 0–3 | Aris |
|---|---|---|
| | Report | Javito 27'; Ivić 52', 77' |

Kalianidis Stadium, Katerini
Attendance: 1,505
Referee: Giorgos Daloukas (Thessaly)

17 January 2008
18:50 EET

| Iraklis | 1–0 | Panionios |
|---|---|---|
| Malagueño 24' | Report |

Kaftanzoglio Stadium, Thessaloniki
Attendance: 1,132
Referee: Dimitrios Kyrkos (Epirus)

10 January 2008
17:50 EET

| Apollon Kalamarias | 1–2 | AEL |
|---|---|---|
| Karaliopoulos 61' | Report | Cleyton 47'; Katsiaros 89' |

Kalamaria Stadium, Thessaloniki
Attendance: 424
Referee: Giannis Stavridis (Pieria)

16 January 2008
21:30 EET

| Olympiacos | 4–0 | Panathinaikos |
|---|---|---|
| LuaLua 6'; Torosidis 63'; Kovačević 65'; Núñez 79' | Report |

Karaiskakis Stadium, Piraeus
Attendance: 30,147
Referee: Anastasios Kakos (Corfu)

16 January 2008
18:50 EET

| Asteras Tripolis | 0–1 | Atromitos |
|---|---|---|
| | Report | Korakakis 90+2' |

Asteras Tripolis Stadium, Tripoli
Attendance: 2,012
Referee: Michael Koukoulakis (Heraklion)

9 January 2008
15:00 EET

| Agrotikos Asteras | 1–1 | OFI |
|---|---|---|
| Kyzeridis 80' | Report | Leozinho 60' |

Agrotikos Asteras Stadium, Thessaloniki
Attendance: 537
Referee: Vasilios Pamporidis (Kilkis)

9 January 2008
21:30 EET

| Skoda Xanthi | 2–0 | AEK Athens |
|---|---|---|
| Radzinski 62'; Labriakos 87' | Report |

Skoda Xanthi Arena, Xanthi
Attendance: 3,427
Referee: Lazaros Polatian (Pella)

==== Replay ====
13 February 2008
16:00 EET

| OFI | 5–0 | Agrotikos Asteras |
|---|---|---|
| Leozinho 32'; Popović 37', 51'; Drulić 82' (pen.); Simić 85' | Report |

Theodoros Vardinogiannis Stadium, Heraklion
Attendance: 470
Referee: Michalis Germanakos (Athens)

== Quarter-finals ==
The draw took place on 24 January 2008.

=== Summary ===
| Team 1 | Agg. | Team 2 | 1st leg | 2nd leg |
|---|---|---|---|---|
| Thrasyvoulos | 4–1 | AEL | 1–0 | 3–1 |
| Olympiacos | 4–2 | Iraklis | 2–0 | 2–2 |
| Atromitos | 4–3 | OFI | 3–1 | 1–2 |
| Skoda Xanthi | 0–1 | Aris | 0–0 | 0–1 |

=== Matches ===
5 March 2008
16:30 EET

| Thrasyvoulos | 1–0 | AEL |
|---|---|---|
| Charalabakis 33' | Report |

Fyli Stadium, Fyli
Attendance: 539
Referee: Dimitris Kyrkos (Epirus)
19 March 2008
15:30 EET

| AEL | 1–3 | Thrasyvoulos |
|---|---|---|
| Metin 70' | Report | Barrientos 50', 74', 89' (pen.) |

Alkazar Stadium, Larissa
Attendance: 2,310
Referee: Lazaros Polatian (Pella)

Thrasyvoulos won 4–1 on aggregate

27 February 2008
20:00 EET

| Olympiacos | 2–0 | Iraklis |
|---|---|---|
| Mendrinos 5', 9' | Report |

Karaiskakis Stadium, Piraeus
Attendance: 16,901
Referee: Giorgos Kasnaferis (Athens)
19 March 2008
20:00 EET

| Iraklis | 2–2 | Olympiacos |
|---|---|---|
| Aarón 42'; Flavio Dias 88' | Report | Bantis 10' (o.g.); Mitroglou 23' |

Lysandros Kaftanzoglou Stadium, Thessaloniki
Attendance: 2,397
Referee: Giannis Stavridis (Pieria)

Olympiacos won 4–2 on aggregate

28 February 2008
17:50 EET

| Atromitos | 3–1 | OFI |
|---|---|---|
| Perrone 68'; Tsigas 76'; Geladaris 83' | Report | Sfakianakis 24' |

Peristeri Stadium, Peristeri
Attendance: 817
Referee: Dimitris Kalopoulos (Thessaloniki)
19 March 2008
17:45 EET

| OFI | 2–1 | Atromitos |
|---|---|---|
| Simić 67'; Michailidis 72' (o.g.) | Report | Luciano 95' |

Pankritio Stadium, Heraklion
Attendance: 1,047
Referee: Anastasios Kakos (Corfu)

Atromitos won 4–3 on aggregate

27 February 2008
17:45 EET

| Skoda Xanthi | 0–0 | Aris |
|---|---|---|
| | Report |

Skoda Xanthi Arena, Xanthi
Attendance: 4,582
Referee: Michael Koukoulakis (Heraklion)
20 March 2008
17:45 EET

| Aris | 1–0 | Skoda Xanthi |
|---|---|---|
| Jahić 72' | Report |

Kleanthis Vikelidis Stadium, Thessaloniki
Attendance: 6,566
Referee: Giorgos Daloukas (Thessaly)

Aris won 1–0 on aggregate

== Semi-finals ==
The draw took place on 24 January 2008, after the quarter-final draw.

=== Summary ===
| Team 1 | Agg. | Team 2 | 1st leg | 2nd leg |
|---|---|---|---|---|
| Thrasyvoulos | 3–6 | Olympiacos | 2–3 | 1–3 |
| Aris | 3–1 | Atromitos | 1–0 | 2–1 |

=== Matches ===
2 April 2008
16:45 EEST

| Thrasyvoulos | 2–3 | Olympiacos |
|---|---|---|
| Anastasakos 30'; Bris 35' | Report | Mendrinos 18'; Núñez 29'; Kovačević 88' |

Fyli Stadium, Fyli
Attendance: 1,642
Referee: Dimitris Kyrkos (Epirus)
16 April 2008
21:00 EEST

| Olympiacos | 3–1 | Thrasyvoulos |
|---|---|---|
| Kovačević 14'; Konstantinou 15'; Núñez 21' | Report | Manikas 33' |

Karaiskakis Stadium, Piraeus
Attendance: 11,142
Referee: Stavros Tritsonis (Athens)

Olympiacos won 6–3 on aggregate.

2 April 2008
19:00 EEST

| Aris | 1–0 | Atromitos |
|---|---|---|
| Calvo 97' (pen.) | Report |

Kleanthis Vikelidis Stadium, Thessaloniki
Attendance: 7,384
Referee: Michael Koukoulakis (Heraklion)
16 April 2008
18:45 EEST

| Atromitos | 1–2 | Aris |
|---|---|---|
| Nikolopoulos 90+3' | Report | Koke 77'; Ivić 82' |

Peristeri Stadium, Peristeri
Attendance: 3,209
Referee: Lazaros Polatian (Pella)

Aris won 3–1 on aggregate.

== Final ==
17 May 2008
19:00 EEST

| Olympiacos | 2–0 | Aris |
|---|---|---|
| Kovačević 33'; Żewłakow 53' | Report |

Kaftanzoglio Stadium, Thessaloniki
Attendance: 19,199
Referee: Giorgos Kasnaferis (Athens)

== Top scorers ==
| Rank | Player | Club | Goals |
|---|---|---|---|
| 1 | (Greece) Giorgos Zacharopoulos | Fostiras | 5 |
| 2 | (Serbia) Darko Kovačević | Olympiacos | 4 |
| 2 | (Croatia) Zdravko Popović | OFI | 4 |
| 2 | (Argentina) Juan Manuel Barrientos | Thrasyvoulos | 4 |
| 2 | (Argentina) Leonel Núñez | Olympiacos | 4 |
| 6 | (Greece) Nestoras Stefanidis | Kastoria | 3 |
| 6 | (Greece) Ioakim Beniskos | Ethnikos Asteras | 3 |
| 6 | (Serbia) Saša Jelovac | Olympiacos Volos | 3 |
| 6 | (Greece) Nikos Soultanidis | Agrotikos Asteras | 3 |
| 6 | (Greece) Kostas Mitroglou | Olympiacos | 3 |
| 6 | (Greece) Kostas Mendrinos | Olympiacos | 3 |
| 6 | (Serbia) Vladimir Ivić | Aris | 3 |
