= 2004–05 A.O. Kerkyra season =

Kerkyra
2004–05 season
- Manager: Lakis Papaioannou
- Stadium: Kerkyra Stadium
- Alpha Ethniki: 16th (relegated)
- Greek Cup: Second round

The 2004–2005 season was Kerkyra's 1st straight season on the Greek first tier, as newly promoted from the 2003-04 Beta Ethniki. Kerkyra ended last in the league and was relegated back.

== Players ==
=== Squad ===
| No. | Pos | Nat | Player | Total | | Alpha Ethniki | |
| No. | Pos | Nat | Player | Apps | Goals | Apps | Goals |
|---|---|---|---|---|---|---|---|
| 1 | FW | (Brazil) BRA | Ederson Fofonka | 14 | 4 | 14 | 4 |
| 2 | GK | (Greece) GRE | Dimitrios Mitrogiannis | 1 | 0 | 1 | 0 |
| 3 | DF | (Greece) GRE | Georgios Georgiou | 23 | 1 | 23 | 1 |
| 4 | MF | (Greece) GRE | Stratos Garozis | 24 | 4 | 24 | 4 |
| 5 | DF | (Greece) GRE | Giannis Sfakianakis | 21 | 0 | 21 | 0 |
| 6 | DF | (Greece) GRE | Georgios Syros | 23 | 1 | 23 | 1 |
| 8 | MF | (Morocco) MAR | Samir Boughanem | 22 | 0 | 22 | 0 |
| 9 | MF | (Greece) GRE | Xenofon Gitas | 25 | 2 | 25 | 2 |
| 10 | MF | (Greece) GRE | Sotiris Antoniou | 22 | 0 | 22 | 0 |
| 11 | MF | (Serbia) SRB | Dusan Vidojevic | 1 | 0 | 1 | 0 |
| 13 | GK | (Greece) GRE | Polychronis Vezyridis | 20 | 0 | 20 | 0 |
| 14 | DF | (Greece) GRE | Georgios Amanatidis | 19 | 0 | 19 | 0 |
| 15 | DF | (Brazil) BRA | Carlos Alberto | 12 | 0 | 12 | 0 |
| 18 | MF | (Greece) GRE | Andreas Niniadis | 25 | 5 | 25 | 5 |
| 20 | FW | (Greece) GRE | Panagiotis Ziakas | 8 | 0 | 8 | 0 |
| 23 | MF | (Australia) AUS | Mike Panopoulos | 4 | 0 | 4 | 0 |
| 24 | MF | (Greece) GRE | Panagiotis Petras | 10 | 0 | 10 | 0 |
| 25 | GK | (Greece) GRE | Theodoros Gitkos | 8 | 0 | 8 | 0 |
| 26 | FW | (Greece) GRE | Ilias Ioannou | 20 | 1 | 20 | 1 |
| 28 | FW | (Senegal) SEN | Seyni N'Diaye | 23 | 2 | 23 | 2 |
| 31 | GK | (Greece) GRE | Christos Lambakis | 1 | 0 | 1 | 0 |
| 32 | DF | (Greece) GRE | Georgios Provatas | 3 | 0 | 3 | 0 |
| 33 | DF | (Greece) GRE | Giorgos Koltzos | 19 | 0 | 19 | 0 |
| 40 | MF | (North Macedonia) MKD | Aguinaldo Braga | 19 | 0 | 19 | 0 |
| 48 | MF | (Portugal) POR | Rui Baião | 1 | 0 | 1 | 0 |
| 71 | MF | (Liberia) LBR | George Gebro | 14 | 0 | 14 | 0 |
| 81 | MF | (Brazil) BRA | Rodrigues | 4 | 0 | 4 | 0 |
| 85 | MF | (Greece) GRE | Thodoros Papagiannis | 3 | 0 | 3 | 0 |
| 86 | MF | (Greece) GRE | Alexis Kantas | 4 | 0 | 4 | 0 |
| 99 | FW | (Sweden) SWE | Njogu Demba-Nyren | 7 | 1 | 7 | 1 |

=== Players who left during the season ===
| No. | Pos | Nat | Player | Total | | Alpha Ethniki | |
| No. | Pos | Nat | Player | Apps | Goals | Apps | Goals |
|---|---|---|---|---|---|---|---|
| 7 | MF | (Belgium) BEL | Jude Vandelannoite | 3 | 0 | 3 | 0 |
| 17 | MF | (Mali) MLI | Bassala Touré | 3 | 0 | 3 | 0 |
| 21 | DF | (Greece) GRE | Panagiotis Katsiaros | 0 | 0 | 0 | 0 |
| 37 | FW | (Greece) GRE | Dimitris Nalitzis | 6 | 0 | 6 | 0 |

== Managers ==
- Nikos Anastopoulos: start of season – 10 January 2005
- Manolis Papadopoulos (caretaker): 11 January 2005 – 25 January 2005
- Georgios Firos: 25 January 2005 – 21 April 2005
- Lakis Papaioannou: 21 April 2005 – 30 June 2005

== Alpha Ethniki ==
=== League table ===
| Pos | Team | Pld | W | D | L | GF | GA | GD | Pts | Qualification or relegation |
|---|---|---|---|---|---|---|---|---|---|---|
| 12 | Apollon Kalamarias | 30 | 8 | 9 | 13 | 31 | 49 | −18 | 33 | |
| 13 | OFI | 30 | 8 | 8 | 14 | 36 | 44 | −8 | 32 | |
| 14 | Aris (Note: Aris had three points deducted for the incidents in the match against Iraklis in the matchday 29.) (R) | 30 | 5 | 13 | 12 | 26 | 37 | −11 | 25 | UEFA Cup first round and relegation to Beta Ethniki (Note: Aris were qualified for the 2005–06 UEFA Cup as runners-up of the Greek Football Cup.) |
| 15 | Ergotelis (R) | 30 | 5 | 5 | 20 | 19 | 50 | −31 | 20 | Relegation to Beta Ethniki |
| 16 | Kerkyra (R) | 30 | 3 | 8 | 19 | 21 | 49 | −28 | 17 | Relegation to Beta Ethniki |

Source: Galanis Sports Data
Rules for classification: 1st points; 2nd head-to-head points; 3rd head-to-head goal difference; 4th decision match.
(R) Relegated
