= Thessaloniki Waterbus =

Ferry companies of Greece

- Locale: Thessaloniki, Peraia, Neoi Epivates
- Waterway: Thermaic Gulf
- Transit type: Ferry
- No. of lines: 1
- No. of vessels: 3
- Website: karavakia.gr/en

The Thessaloniki Waterbus, operated as Karavakia (Greek: Καραβάκια, Little Boats), is a ferry service connecting central Thessaloniki with the nearby beach towns of Peraia and Neoi Epivates, in the Thessaloniki metropolitan area. It operates a fleet of three ships (Konstantis, Olympia, and Aghios Georgios) on a single 50-minute route.

== See also ==
- Transport in Greece
- Greek shipping
