= Dinos Konstantakis =

Greek footballer

Personal information
- Full name: Konstantinos Konstantakis
- Date of birth: 13 April 1986 (age 40)
- Place of birth: Heraklion, Greece
- Height: 1.80 m (5 ft 11 in)
- Position: Defender

Team information
- Current team: Olympiakos Chersonissos

Senior career*
Years	Team	Apps	(Gls)
n/a–n/a	OFI	n/a (n/a)	
n/a–n/a	Rodos	n/a (n/a)	
2007–2008	Aiolikos	24 (–)	
2008–present	Olympiakos Chersonissos	– (–)	
- * Club domestic league appearances and goals

Dinos Konstantakis (born 13 April 1986 in Heraklion, Greece) is a Greek football player who played for Olympiakos Chersonissos during the 2008–09 Gamma Ethniki season.

== See also ==
- Football in Greece
- List of Greece international footballers
