= Peraia, Thessaloniki =

Town in Central Macedonia, Greece

Peraia Περαία
- Community
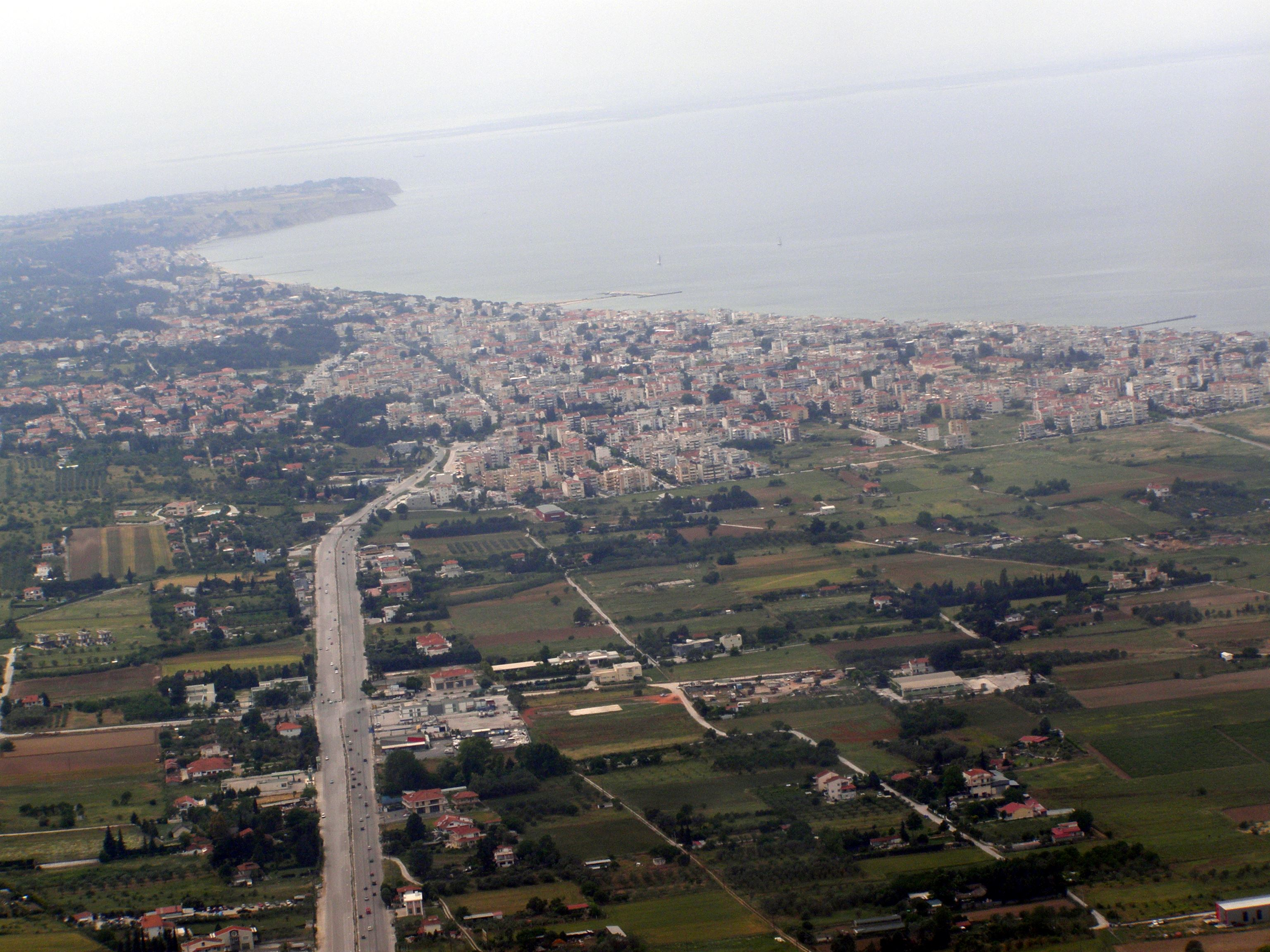
- Aerial view of Peraia

- Location within Greece
- Coordinates: 40°30′N 22°55.5′E
- Country: Greece
- Administrative region: Central Macedonia
- Regional unit: Thessaloniki
- Municipality: Thermaikos
- Municipal unit: Thermaikos
- City established: 1923 (103 years ago)

Population (2021)
  - Community: 16,995
- Time zone: UTC+2 (EET)
  - Summer (DST): UTC+3 (EEST)

Peraia (Greek: Περαία) is a small town south of Thessaloniki in Greece. It is part of the municipality of Thermaikos. Peraia is located on the south coast of the Thermaic Gulf, 15 km south of the Thessaloniki city centre and 4 km west of the Thessaloniki International Airport.

== History ==
As is the case for the two other communities in the municipal unit of Thermaikos, Agia Triada and Neoi Epivates, the origin of settlement in Peraia was the arrival of 740 refugees from Asia Minor and Eastern Thrace in 1923, as a result of the Greco-Turkish War (1919–22).

Today Peraia, together with the other suburbs of Thermaikos, forms one of the most rapidly developing suburbs of Thessaloniki, with many people choosing to move there; but infrastructure is hardly keeping pace, with many roads remaining unopened or inadequate for today's needs. Although developments have been made in creating a pedestrianised beachfront and creating new open spaces.
