= 2009–10 Gamma Ethniki =

Season of Greek football

Gamma Ethniki
- Season: 2009–10
- Champions: Kallithea (South); Veria (North)
- Promoted: Kallithea; Veria; Trikala
- Relegated: Atsalenios; Panargiakos; Saronikos; Chaidari; Pyrsos Grevena; PAONE; Visaltiakos; Thermaikos; Kastoria

The 2009–10 Gamma Ethniki was the 27th season since the official establishment of the third tier of Greek football in 1983. It started on September 11, 2009, and finished on May 16, 2010.

== Southern Group ==
Location of teams in South Group of 2009–10 Gamma Ethniki

=== League table ===
Pos	Team	Pld	W	D	L	GF	GA	GD	Pts	Promotion or relegation
1	Kallithea (C, P)	32	23	0	9	53	27	+26	69	Promotion to Football League
2	Vyzas	32	21	6	5	47	19	+28	69	Qualification for Promotion play-off
3	Panachaiki	32	20	6	6	61	31	+30	66	
4	Zakynthos	32	16	4	12	53	41	+12	52	
5	PAO Rouf	32	14	9	9	33	21	+12	51	
6	Olympiakos Hersonissos	32	14	6	12	31	28	+3	48	
7	Aspropyrgos	32	13	7	12	37	41	−4	46	
8	Agia Paraskevi	32	11	11	10	33	29	+4	44	
9	Korinthos	32	12	8	12	31	36	−5	44	
10	Keravnos Keratea	32	10	11	11	33	36	−3	41	
11	Panegialios	32	11	8	13	32	33	−1	41	
12	Aias Salamina	32	10	10	12	36	34	+2	40	
13	Platanias	32	10	9	13	32	36	−4	39	
14	Atsalenios (R)	32	10	7	15	33	43	−10	37	Relegation to Delta Ethniki
15	Panargiakos (R)	32	9	8	15	30	40	−10	35	Relegation to Delta Ethniki
16	Saronikos (R)	32	8	3	21	31	58	−27	27	Relegation to Delta Ethniki
17	Chaidari (R)	32	1	5	26	22	75	−53	8	Relegation to Delta Ethniki

(C) Champions; (P) Promoted; (R) Relegated

=== Results ===
Home \ Away	AGP	AIA	ASP	ATS	HAI	KLT	KER	KOR	OCH	PCK	PAN	PNG	ROF	PLA	SAR	VYZ	ZAK
Agia Paraskevi		1–0	2–1	2–0	0–0	1–2	1–1	3–1	2–0	2–1	1–1	1–1	0–0	4–0	5–1	1–0	2–1
Aias Salamina	1–0		0–0	0–0	6–0	0–1	0–0	2–2	3–1	2–3	1–1	2–1	0–0	0–0	2–0	1–2	1–0
Aspropyrgos	1–0	2–0		2–1	3–2	1–3	1–1	1–0	0–1	0–2	2–1	1–2	1–0	1–0	1–0	0–1	3–4
Atsalenios	3–0	4–2	3–0		3–2	1–2	1–2	0–1	1–0	1–0	0–0	0–0	1–1	1–0	0–1	0–2	0–1
Chaidari	2–2	1–3	1–1	0–1		1–2	0–1	1–3	0–2	1–2	1–2	0–3	0–3	2–2	5–1	1–1	2–4
Kallithea	3–0	1–0	3–0	4–0	4–0		2–1	4–1	0–2	0–2	1–0	2–1	0–1	3–2	4–0	3–1	2–0
Keravnos Keratea	1–1	0–2	0–0	1–1	1–0	1–0		1–1	1–0	4–1	2–1	2–0	0–0	1–1	1–0	3–1	2–2
Korinthos	2–0	0–2	0–1	2–1	1–0	1–2	1–0		0–2	0–2	0–0	1–0	0–2	1–0	1–1	2–2	3–0
Olympiakos Hersonissos	0–0	1–1	1–1	3–0	2–0	1–2	4–1	2–1		1–3	0–0	1–0	0–2	0–0	1–0	0–2	1–0
Panachaiki	2–1	1–1	1–0	1–1	3–1	2–0	4–1	0–1	2–0		4–1	0–0	4–1	2–0	2–0	1–0	3–2
Panargiakos	0–0	2–1	1–2	1–2	3–0	0–1	2–1	0–0	1–0	1–3		1–1	0–2	2–0	1–3	0–3	3–0
Panegialios	1–0	0–0	4–2	1–0	1–0	0–1	3–1	0–0	2–0	1–4	2–1		1–1	2–2	2–1	0–1	1–0
PAO Rouf	0–0	3–0	0–0	2–1	2–0	1–0	2–0	0–1	0–1	3–3	0–1	2–0		1–0	2–1	0–1	2–1
Platanias	2–0	1–0	2–3	1–1	2–0	3–0	1–1	1–2	1–0	1–1	2–0	1–0	1–0		3–1	0–1	0–1
Saronikos	0–1	0–1	1–4	3–5	5–0	2–0	2–1	2–2	0–2	1–0	0–2	1–0	0–0	0–1		2–3	3–2
Vyzas	1–0	2–0	1–1	1–0	3–0	0–1	1–0	3–0	0–0	0–0	3–0	3–2	2–0	3–0	1–0		1–0
Zakynthos	0–0	4–2	3–1	5–0	5–0	2–1	1–0	1–0	1–2	3–2	2–1	1–0	1–0	2–2	3–0	1–1	

Legend: Blue = home team win; Yellow = draw; Red = away team win.

== Northern Group ==
Location of teams in North Group of 2009–10 Gamma Ethniki

=== League table ===
Pos	Team	Pld	W	D	L	GF	GA	GD	Pts	Promotion or relegation
1	Veria (Note: Veria had 2 point deducted.) (C, P)	32	20	7	5	51	20	+31	65	Promotion to Football League
2	Trikala (P)	32	18	10	4	40	11	+29	64	Qualification for Promotion play-off
3	Anagennisi Epanomi	32	17	10	5	40	23	+17	61	
4	Anagennisi Giannitsa	32	16	10	6	60	36	+24	58	
5	Eordaikos	32	16	8	8	40	21	+19	56	
6	Makedonikos	32	14	10	8	35	24	+11	52	
7	Pyrsos Grevena (Note: Pyrsos Grevena declared bankrupt and relegated to the local championships.) (R)	32	14	7	11	38	27	+11	49	Relegation to Delta Ethniki
8	Ethnikos Filippiada	32	14	6	12	39	36	+3	48	
9	Fokikos	32	13	8	11	31	27	+4	47	
10	Doxa Kranoula	32	8	15	9	26	30	−4	39	
11	Niki Volos	32	9	11	12	30	38	−8	38	
12	Odysseas Anagennisi	32	8	13	11	33	30	+3	37	
13	Kozani	32	8	12	12	24	27	−3	36	
14	PAONE (R)	32	9	9	14	26	37	−11	36	Relegation to Delta Ethniki
15	Visaltiakos (R)	32	6	10	16	30	42	−12	28	Relegation to Delta Ethniki
16	Thermaikos (R)	32	5	5	22	25	58	−33	20	Relegation to Delta Ethniki
17	Kastoria (R)	32	1	1	30	7	85	−78	4	Relegation to Delta Ethniki

(C) Champions; (P) Promoted; (R) Relegated

=== Results ===
Home \ Away	EPA	AGA	DOK	EOR	EFI	FOK	KAS	KOZ	MAK	NVL	ANS	PNE	PGR	THE	TRI	VER	VIS
Anagennisi Epanomi		2–1	1–1	0–0	1–2	1–0	3–0	2–1	2–0	3–0	1–1	1–0	2–0	1–0	0–1	1–0	2–1
Anagennisi Giannitsa	1–0		1–1	3–2	2–0	6–0	3–0	1–1	0–0	1–2	3–2	4–1	2–1	3–0	0–0	2–1	6–3
Doxa Kranoula	1–1	1–3		1–3	3–0	1–2	3–0	1–1	1–1	0–0	0–0	1–1	2–1	2–0	1–0	1–2	2–0
Eordaikos	1–1	1–0	0–0		2–0	2–1	3–0	1–0	1–0	1–0	0–1	2–0	1–1	3–0	0–0	4–0	2–0
Ethnikos Filippiada	0–1	1–1	6–0	1–0		0–1	1–0	1–0	1–0	2–1	1–0	2–1	0–2	5–2	1–1	0–0	2–1
Fokikos	1–1	3–0	2–0	2–0	1–0		2–1	0–1	0–0	1–1	0–0	1–0	0–1	1–0	0–0	0–0	1–0
Kastoria	1–2	0–3	0–0	1–3	0–3	0–3		0–3	0–3	0–1	0–5	0–3	0–3	0–3	0–3	0–3	0–3
Kozani	2–2	0–0	1–0	0–1	0–1	0–0	3–0		1–0	0–1	2–0	1–1	0–1	0–1	0–0	1–4	2–1
Makedonikos	1–1	1–3	0–0	0–0	4–1	3–1	2–1	2–0		2–0	2–0	1–1	0–0	1–0	2–1	1–1	1–0
Niki Volos	2–1	0–0	1–1	1–1	2–0	1–0	3–0	1–1	1–1		1–2	4–0	2–1	0–2	0–2	1–3	1–1
Odysseas Anagennisi	0–2	1–1	1–0	1–1	2–3	1–1	3–0	0–0	0–1	2–2		0–0	0–1	1–1	0–0	2–2	2–2
PAONE	0–0	1–3	0–0	1–0	1–1	1–2	3–0	0–1	1–2	0–0	1–0		3–2	1–0	1–0	0–2	0–1
Pyrsos Grevena	4–1	2–2	0–0	2–1	2–1	1–0	3–0	1–1	1–0	1–0	0–1	4–1		1–0	0–1	0–1	0–0
Thermaikos	1–2	1–3	0–1	0–3	1–0	0–4	1–3	1–1	1–2	1–0	1–4	1–3	2–2		0–1	0–2	2–2
Trikala	0–0	4–0	0–0	3–0	1–0	2–0	3–0	2–0	1–0	1–1	1–0	2–0	1–0	2–1		1–0	4–0
Veria	0–1	2–0	2–0	1–0	2–2	1–0	3–0	1–0	2–0	4–0	1–0	0–0	2–1	4–1	3–1		0–0
Visaltiakos	0–1	2–2	0–1	0–1	1–1	2–1	2–0	0–0	1–2	3–0	0–1	0–1	1–0	1–1	1–1	1–2	

Legend: Blue = home team win; Yellow = draw; Red = away team win.

== Play-off match ==
29 May 2010
19:00 EEST

Vyzas	0–2	Trikala
	Report	Enoc 50', 90+3'

Nea Smyrni Stadium, Nea Smyrni
Attendance: 4,000
Referee: Anastasios Kakos (Corfu)
