= Tzelepis =

Tzelepis (Greek: Τζελέπης) is a Greek surname. Notable people with the surname include:

- Georgios Tzelepis (born 1999), Greek footballer
- Giannis Tzelepis (born 1984), Greek footballer
