= Thermaikos =

Thermaikos Θερμαϊκός
- Municipality
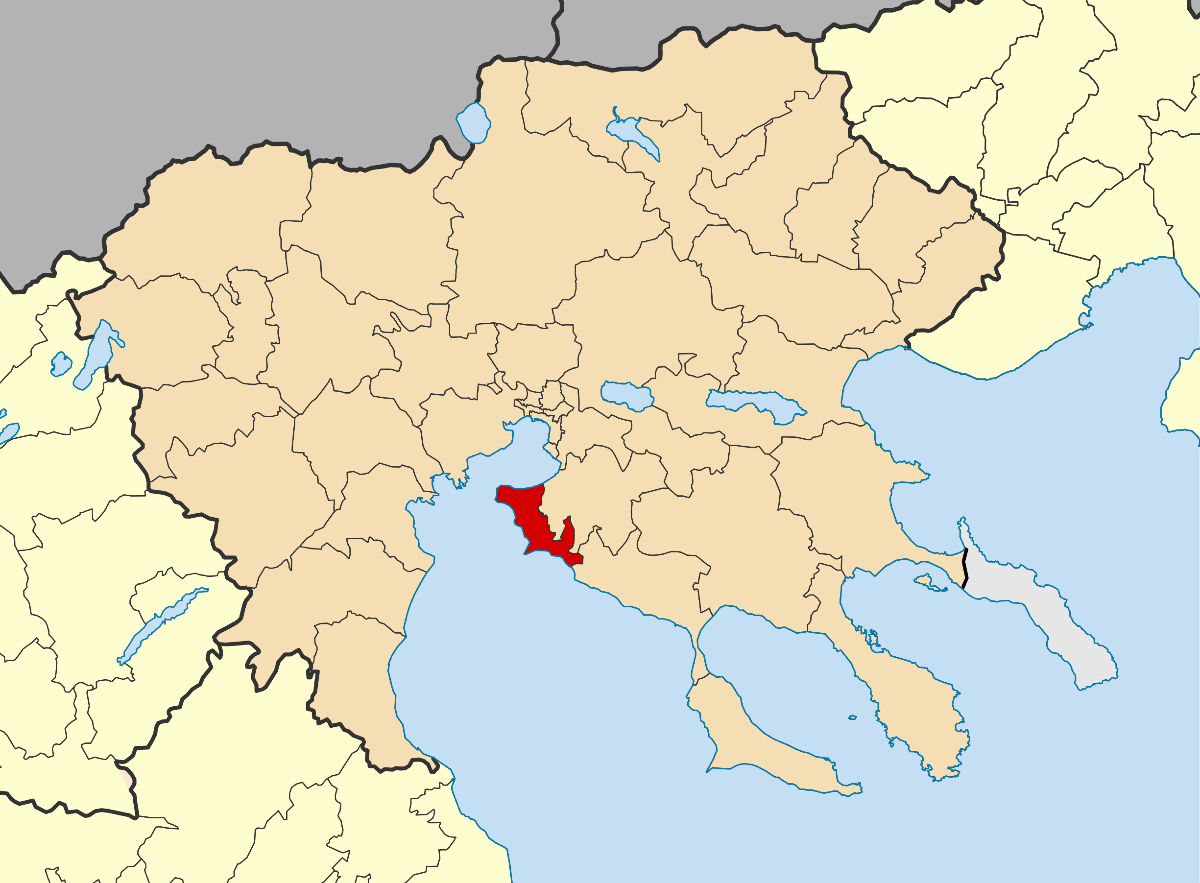

- Location within Greece
- Coordinates: 40°30′N 22°55′E
- Country: Greece
- Administrative region: Central Macedonia
- Regional unit: Thessaloniki
- Seat: Peraia

Area
  - Municipality: 133.41 km^{2} (51.51 sq mi)
  - Municipal unit: 20.30 km^{2} (7.84 sq mi)

Population (2021)
  - Municipality: 45,561
  - Density: 341.51/km^{2} (884.51/sq mi)
  - Municipal unit: 24,867
  - Municipal unit density: 1,225/km^{2} (3,173/sq mi)
- Time zone: UTC+2 (EET)
  - Summer (DST): UTC+3 (EEST)

Thermaikos (Greek: Θερμαϊκός) is a suburban municipality of the regional unit of Thessaloniki, Greece. It consists of the municipal units Thermaikos, Epanomi and Michaniona. The municipal unit Thermaikos is subdivided into the communities Peraia, Neoi Epivates and Agia Triada. The municipality Thermaikos has an area of 133.41 km^{2} and the municipal unit Thermaikos has an area of 20.300 km^{2}. Thermaikos stretches for 10 km along the southeastern coast of the Thermaic Gulf. The seat of the municipality is in Peraia.

== Municipality ==
The municipality of Thermaikos was formed at the 2011 local government reform by the merger of the following 3 former municipalities, that became municipal units:

- Epanomi
- Michaniona
- Thermaikos
