= Agia Paraskevi F.C. =

Agia Paraskevi
- Full name: Athlitikos Omilos Agias Paraskevis (Athletic Union of Agia Paraskevi)
- Nickname: Santa (Saint)
- Founded: 1931; 95 years ago
- Ground: Municipal Stadium of Agia Paraskevi
- Capacity: 2,800
- Chairman: Dimitrios Gkofas
- Manager: Stathis Panakoulias
- League: Athens FCA Second Division
- 2025–26: Athens FCA Second Division, 9th
- Website: http://www.agiaparaskevifc.gr/
Home colours	Away colours

Agia Paraskevi Football Club, unofficially known as Santa (Greek: Αθλητικός Όμιλος Αγίας Παρασκευής, Athlitikos Omilos Agias Paraskevis) is a Greek association football club based in the city of Athens, Greece. Their home ground facilities are based in "Notou Street" at Agia Paraskevi of Athens, Greece. The club also has basketball, volleyball and futsal departments.

== History ==
It is affectionally known as Santa or Agia and contains a strong rivalry with Nea Ionia F.C. “Santa-Fans” is a supporters fan group with more than 15 years history from Aghia Paraskevi.

In 1992, they won both the championship and the cup of the Athens Football Clubs Association.

In 1995, volleyball team was also created, followed by a futsal team in 1996.

In 2008, they promoted to Third Division, South Group. They were ranked 15th during the 2010-11 season.

In 2009, SANTA's women's football team was also created.

Together with Rouf, it is the only team in Athens to have three cup titles.

Since 2013, the club is run by the American–Canadian of Greek descent entrepreneur, James Avgoustidis who wants to bring the team back to the top divisions.

== Honours ==
Agia Paraskevi F.C. honours
Type	Competition	Titles	Winners	Runners-up	Third place
Domestic	Delta Ethniki (Fourth-tier)	1	2007–08 (Group 8)		2004–05 (Group 9), 2006–07 (Group 8)
Regional	Athens FCA First Division	3	1991–92, 2003–04, 2021–22		
Regional	Athens FCA Cup	3^{s}	1991–92, 2004–05, 2007–08	2017–18	

- record
- ^{S} Shared record

== Domestic performance ==
=== Season by season in the higher divisions ===
Season	Category	Position	Points	GF \ GA	Cup	Ref.
2004–05	Delta Ethniki (Group 9)	3rd	52	42—23	—	
2005–06	Delta Ethniki (Group 8)	4th	52	59—26	—	
2006–07	Delta Ethniki (Group 8)	3rd	56	58—31	—	
2007–08	Delta Ethniki (Group 8)	**1st** (C) (P)	56	51—14	—	
2008–09	Gamma Ethniki (Southern Group)	8th	46	43—43	First Round	
2009–10	Gamma Ethniki (Southern Group)	8th	44	33—29	—	
2010–11	Football League 2 (Southern Group)	15th (R)	14	13—62	Second Round	
2011–12	Delta Ethniki (Group 8)	12th (R)	29	31—31	—	
2022–23	Gamma Ethniki (Group 5)	**6th**	37	29—22	—	
2023–24	Gamma Ethniki (Group 4)	17th (R)	17	26—82	—	

The best result is highlighted in bold.

Key: 1R = First Round, 2R = Second Round, 3R = Third Round, 4R = Fourth Round, 5R = Fifth Round, GS = Group Stage, R16 = Round of 16, QF = Quarter-finals, SF = Semi-finals, C = Champion, P = Promotion, R = Relegation.

=== Greek Cup campaigns ===
Season	Round	Venue	Opponent	Home	Away	Qual.	Ref.
1962–63	First Round		Ethnikos Psychiko	3–2	–		
1962–63	Second Round		Athinais	–	1–6		
1962–63	Third Round	Ag. Paraskevi Municipal Stadium	PAO Ag. Dimitrios	5–0	–		
1962–63	Fourth Round	Ag. Paraskevi Municipal Stadium	Doxa Vyrona	1–2	–		
1963–64	First Round	–	Bye	–	–	–	
1963–64	Second Round	Vyronas National Stadium	Doxa Vyrona	–	4–3		
2008–09	First Round	Ag. Paraskevi Municipal Stadium	Fokikos	0–1	–		
2010–11	First Round	Ag. Paraskevi Municipal Stadium	AO Chania	3–2	–		
2010–11	Second Round	Ag. Paraskevi Municipal Stadium	Ethnikos Asteras	0–1	–		

- Matches are classified as home or away depending on the team's allocation established after the Hellenic Football Federation's competition draw. Home and away games may not always take place at the designated home venue of the respective team.

== Players ==
=== Current squad ===
As of 8 November 2024

Note: Flags indicate national team as defined under FIFA eligibility rules; some limited exceptions apply. Players may hold more than one non-FIFA nationality.

No.	Pos.	Nation	Player
—	GK	GRE	Nikolaos Sfyridis
—	GK	GRE	Panagiotis Panousis
—	GK	GRE	Emmanouil Mema
—	GK	GRE	Anastasios Zotos
—	DF	GRE	Konstantinos Stylianopoulos
—	DF	GRE	Xenofon Kastaniotis
—	DF	GRE	Dimitrios Platykostas
—	DF	ALB	Edi Haxhiu
—	DF	GRE	Antonios Kouraklis
—	DF	GRE	Giannis Zachos
—	DF	GRE	Vangelis Avlonitis
—	DF	GRE	Vangelis Kollias

No.	Pos.	Nation	Player
—	MF	GRE	Georgios Michailidis
—	MF	GRE	Stelios Mytakis
—	MF	GRE	Serxhio Prifti
—	MF	GRE	Nikolaos Tsinias
—	MF	GRE	Thomas Bubullima
—	MF	GRE	Athanasios Theodoridis
—	MF	GRE	Konstantinos Dimitriou
—	MF	GRE	Antonios Antoneas
—	MF	GRE	Michalis Koutsoupias
—	FW	GRE	Georgios Mouzos
—	FW	GRE	Georgios Chrysanthakopoulos
—	FW	GRE	Alexandros Seferis

== Notable former coaches ==
=== Youth team ===
- (Serbia) Milan Pavlović (2003–04)

=== First team ===
- (Greece) Miltos Gofas (2001–10, 2023–24)
- (Serbia) (Belgium) Ivan Nedeljković (2012–14)

== List of former players ==
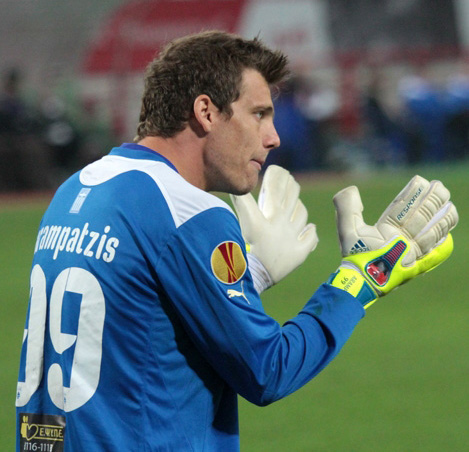
Giannis Arabatzis

Greece

- (Greece) Georgios Iordanidis (1996–01)
- (Greece) Georgios Daraklitsas (2004–06)
- (Greece) Theodoros Koubaroulis (2005, 2006, 2009–11)
- (Greece) Panagiotis Kouros (2006–10)
- (Greece) Georgios Provatas (2007–08)
- (Greece) Giannis Loukinas (2007–09)
- (Greece) Spyros Dorovinis (2007–10)
- (Greece) Andreas Archontakis (2008–10)
- (Greece) Nikos Iordanidis (2008–10)
- (Greece) (England) Michael Banias (2009–10)
- (Greece) Sokratis Petrou (2009–10)
- (Greece) Thanasis Staikos (2009–10)
- (Greece) Avgerinos Katranas (2009–10)
- (Greece) Panagiotis Bris (2009–10)
- (Greece) Konstantinos Mamalos (2009–10)
- (Greece) (Romania) Nikos Barboudis (2009–10)
- (Greece) Nikolaos Karpontinis (2009–11)
- (Greece) Vasilios Papadopoulos (2009–11, 2013)
- (Greece) Christos Gromitsaris (2010)
- (Greece) Panagiotis Vasilakos (2010)
- (Greece) Thomas Makris (2010–11)
- (Greece) Stratos Michelis (2010–11)
- (Greece) Nikitas Tournas (2010–11)
- (Greece) Giannis Sotirhos (2012–14)
- (Greece) Agisilaos Pasas (2014–15)
- (Greece) Leonidas Panagopoulos (2020)
- (Greece) Dimitrios Sialmas (2020)
- (Greece) Giannis Arabatzis (2022–24)
- (Greece) Panagiotis Kontoes (2022–24)
- (Greece) Thanasis Dimitroulas (2023–24)

Rest of Europe

- (Germany) André Heinisch (2009)
- (Italy) (Brazil) Luigi Barbieri (2023)
- (Portugal) (Guinea-Bissau) Sandro Semedo (2023)
- (Serbia) (Belgium) Ivan Nedeljković (2008–09)

Americas

- (Curaçao) (Netherlands) Doriano Kortstam (2023–24)
- (United States) (Greece) Andreas Chronis (2009–10)

== See also ==
- Agia Paraskevi W.F.C.
- GS Agia Paraskevi
- Basketball Agia Paraskevi
