= Panagiotis Kontoes =

Greek footballer

Personal information
- Date of birth: 20 June 1996 (age 30)
- Place of birth: Greece
- Height: 1.90 m (6 ft 3 in)
- Position: Centre-back

Team information
- Current team: Asteras Derveni

Youth career
- 2009–2016: AEK Athens

Senior career*
Years	Team	Apps	(Gls)
2016–2017	Panegialios	7	(0)
2017	Zemplín Michalovce	0	(0)
2017	Acharnaikos		
2017–2018	Doxa Vyronas		
2018	Niki Volos		
2018–2019	Apollon Larissa	22	(2)
2019–2020	Apollon Pontus	5	(1)
2020–2021	Thesprotos	18	(2)
2021–2022	Ierapetra	21	(0)
2022–2024	Agia Paraskevi		
2025–	Asteras Derveni		
- * Club domestic league appearances and goals as of 1 May 2022

Panagiotis Kontoes (Greek: Παναγιώτης Κοντοές; born 20 June 1996) is a Greek professional footballer who plays as a centre-back for Asteras Derveni.
