= Giannis Katsikis =

Greek footballer

Personal information
- Full name: Ioannis Katsikis
- Date of birth: 24 May 1979 (age 47)
- Height: 1.80 m (5 ft 11 in)
- Position: Forward

Senior career*
Years	Team	Apps	(Gls)
2000–2011	Thrasyvoulos	219	(17)
2001	→ Akratitos (loan)		
2011–2012	Kallithea	35	(12)
2012–2013	Apollon Smyrnis	36	(11)
2013–2014	Olympiacos Volos	1	(1)
2014–2015	Ionikos		
2015–2016	Thrasyvoulos		
2016	Attalos Nea Peramos		
2016	Agioi Anargyroi		
2016–2017	Aspropyrgos		
- * Club domestic league appearances and goals

Giannis Katsikis (Greek: Γιάννης Κατσίκης; born 24 May 1979) is a Greek former professional footballer.
