= Juan Manuel Barrientos =

Argentine football midfielder

Personal information
- Date of birth: March 4, 1982 (age 44)
- Place of birth: Lomas de Zamora, Argentina
- Height: 1.75 m (5 ft 9 in)
- Position: Left winger

Youth career
- 1998–2003: Racing Club

Senior career*
Years	Team	Apps	(Gls)
2003–2004	Racing Club	3	(0)
2004	Deportivo Mandiyú	10	(4)
2005–2007	Lorient	32	(0)
2007–2009	Thrasyvoulos	46	(7)
2010	CD Olmedo	6	(0)
2010	Trikala	7	(0)
2011	Lokomotiv Plovdiv	1	(0)
- * Club domestic league appearances and goals as of December 30, 2010

Juan Manuel Barrientos (born 4 March 1982 in Lomas de Zamora, Buenos Aires) is an Argentine football midfielder.

== Career ==
Barrientos began his career at Racing Club in the Primera Division Argentina in 2003. In 2004, he played 6 months in the Regionalised Torneo Argentino B of Argentine football for Textil Mandiyú. In 2005, he was released by Racing Club and he moved to France.

In 2005, he began his new life in French Ligue 2 club FC Lorient with high expectations. At the end of the 2005–2006 season the club were promoted to Ligue 1 and Barrientos saw his return to top-level football.

After his time in the Greek championship, Juan Manuel got married on the 20th of June 2008.
