= Doriano Kortstam =

Dutch-born Curaçaoan footballer

Personal information
- Full name: Doriano Marvin Kortstam
- Date of birth: 7 July 1994 (age 32)
- Place of birth: Rotterdam, Netherlands
- Height: 1.86 m (6 ft 1 in)
- Position: Centre-back

Youth career
- DOTO
- –2008: Excelsior Pernis
- 2008–2009: Feyenoord
- 2009–2010: Spartaan'20
- 2010–2011: SVV
- 2011–2012: Veendam
- 2012–2013: FC Boshuizen
- 2013–2014: Nike Academy

Senior career*
Years	Team	Apps	(Gls)
2014–2015	Zemplín Michalovce	0	(0)
2014	→ Slavoj Trebišov (loan)	10	(3)
2015–2017	Roda JC	0	(0)
2017	Achilles '29	14	(1)
2017–2018	Eindhoven	28	(1)
2018–2019	Platanias	25	(1)
2020	Platanias	6	(0)
2020–2021	Orihuela	17	(0)
2021–2022	Irodotos	27	(1)
2022–2023	TEC	6	(0)
2023–2024	Agia Paraskevi	0	(0)
2024	A.E. Mykonou	0	(0)

International career
2016–2017	Curaçao	2	(0)
- * Club domestic league appearances and goals as of 17:34, 8 November 2024 (UTC)

Doriano Marvin Kortstam (born 7 July 1994) is a Dutch-Curaçaoan professional footballer who is a free agent.

== Club career ==
He made his professional debut in the Eerste Divisie for Achilles '29 on 6 February 2017 in a game against Eindhoven.

== Honours ==
Curaçao

- Caribbean Cup: 2017
