= Andreas Chronis =

Greek-American soccer player

Personal information
- Full name: Andreas Chronis
- Date of birth: April 25, 1989 (age 37)
- Place of birth: Bayside, Queens, New York, United States
- Height: 1.76 m (5 ft 9 in)
- Positions: Left winger; left back

Youth career
- Eleftherian-Pancyprians
- BW Gottschee
- New York Cosmos
- New York Red Bulls
- New York Pancyprian-Freedoms

Senior career*
Years	Team	Apps	(Gls)
2007–2009	AEK Athens	0	(0)
2007–2009	→ A.O. Nea Ionia (loan)	57	(11)
2009–2010	Agia Paraskevi	13	(0)
2010–2012	Panachaiki	17	(0)
2012–2013	A.O.Nea Ionia	0	(0)
2013–2015	FC Motown	20	(4)
?–2024	New York Pancyprian-Freedoms	0	(0)

International career
2006	United States U17		
2007	United States U18		

Managerial career
- 2024–2025: New York Pancyprian-Freedoms
- 2025: New York City (youth)
- * Club domestic league appearances and goals

Andreas Chronis (Greek: Ανδρέας Χρόνης; born 25 April 1989 in Bayside, Queens, New York) is a retired Greek-American professional soccer player who last played for semi-professional club New York Pancyprian Freedoms.

== Career ==
=== AEK Athens and Nea Ionia ===
After graduating from Holy Cross High School in 2007, Chronis was set to attend and play for Columbia University, but instead signed a four-and-a-half-year contract with Greek Super League club AEK Athens. Upon joining AEK, the club loaned Chronis to Delta Ethniki club Nea Ionia for two consecutive seasons, where Chronis made a total of 57 appearances and scored 11 goals.

=== Agia Paraskevi and Panachaiki ===
During the summer transfer period of 2009, Chronis had an unsuccessful trial with English third division side Brighton before Football League club Agia Paraskevi acquired Chronis from AEK. Chronis made an immediate impact at Agia Paraskevi, and his performances were impressive enough that promotion contenders Panachaiki would buy him during the winter transfer period.

In 2010–11, Chronis made 11 appearances as Panachaiki earned promotion to the Football League.

In December 2011, the contract between Panachaiki and Chronis was terminated by mutual consent.

== International career ==
Chronis has participated with the United States Under-17 national team and United States Under-18 national team.
