= Nikos Iordanidis =

Greek footballer

Personal information
- Full name: Nikolaos Iordanidis
- Date of birth: 17 July 1980 (age 46)
- Place of birth: Eptamyloi, Serres, Greece
- Height: 1.85 m (6 ft 1 in)
- Position: Forward

Youth career
- –1999: A.E Chrysou

Senior career*
Years	Team	Apps	(Gls)
1999–2004	OFI	46	(17)
2003	→ Akratitos (loan)	12	(8)
2003–2004	→ Akratitos (loan)	10	(10)
2004	Kallithea	10	(5)
2004–2005	AEP Paphos	19	(15)
2005–2006	Panserraikos	5	(13)
2006–2007	Agrotikos Asteras	40	(16)
2007–2008	Olympiacos Volos	25	(10)
2008–2010	Agia Paraskevi	53	(24)
2010–2011	Panegialios	21	(6)
2012	Asteras Magoula	28	(20)
2012–2016	Pefki	36	(23)
- * Club domestic league appearances and goals as of 1 July 2011

Nikos Iordanidis (Greek: Νίκος Ιορδανίδης; born 17 July 1980) is a Greek former professional footballer who played as a forward.

== Career ==
Born in Eptamyloi, Serres, He made his debut in professional football with OFI in the Alpha Ethniki at age 18 in 1999. That season, he was voted as the league's young footballer of the year. Iordanidis had hoped to join an Italian Serie B side in 2003, but OFI sent him on loan to Alpha Ethniki rivals Akratitos instead. Soon after, OFI cancelled his contract leaving him free to join Kallithea F.C. in January 2004.

Iordanidis had a brief spell in the Cypriot First Division with AEP Paphos F.C. and returned to Greece where he has played in the second and third divisions, most recently signing with Pefki, a club contesting in the Regional Championship, based in the homonymous northern suburb of Athens.
