= Miltos Gofas =

Greek footballer

Personal information
- Full name: Miltiadis Gofas
- Date of birth: 7 January 1957 (age 69)
- Place of birth: Athens, Greece

Managerial career
- Years: Team
- 2001–2010: Agia Paraskevi
- 2010–2011: Rouf
- 2012: Rouf
- 2013: Paniliakos
- 2013: Vyzas
- 2013–2014: Kalamata
- 2014–2015: Doxa Nea Manolada
- 2016: Ialysos
- 2016: Achaiki
- 2017–2018: Pelopas Kiato
- 2021: Panegialios
- 2021–2022: Nea Artaki
- 2023–2024: Agia Paraskevi

Miltos Gofas (Greek: Μίλτος Γκόφας; born 7 January 1957) is a Greek football manager.
