= Avgerinos Katranas =

Greek footballer

Personal information
- Date of birth: 20 February 1988 (age 38)
- Place of birth: Xanthi, Greece
- Height: 1.83 m (6 ft 0 in)
- Position: Centre back

Team information
- Current team: Nestos Chrysoupoli F.C.

Youth career
- –2006: Panathinaikos

Senior career*
Years	Team	Apps	(Gls)
2006–2008	Panathinaikos	0	(0)
2007	→ Panserraikos (loan)	4	(0)
2008	→ Panetolikos (loan)	5	(1)
2008–2009	Koropi F.C.	17	(2)
2009–2010	Agia Paraskevi	28	(0)
2010–2011	Apollon Smyrnis	15	(1)
2011–2012	Korinthos F.C.		
2013	Vyzas Megara	7	(0)
2013–	Nestos Chrysoupoli F.C.	20	(0)
- * Club domestic league appearances and goals as of 1 July 2011

Avgerinos Katranas (Greek: Αυγερινός Κατράνας; born 20 February 1988) is a Greek footballer currently playing for Nestos Chrysoupoli F.C. in the Football League 2 as a centre back.

== Career ==
Katranas began his career in the Panathinaikos youth academy and played there until June 2008. He had also played for Panserraikos F.C., Panetolikos F.C., Koropi F.C., Agia Paraskevi, Apollon Smyrnis, Korinthos F.C. and Vyzas Megara
