= Georgios Syros =

Greek footballer

Personal information
- Date of birth: 8 February 1976 (age 50)
- Place of birth: Athens, Greece
- Height: 1.88 m (6 ft 2 in)
- Position: Defender

Senior career*
Years	Team	Apps	(Gls)
2001	Akratitos		
2001	→Bury (loan)	9	(1)
2002–2005	AO Kerkyra		
2005–2007	Thrasyvoulos		
2007-2009	Kallithea		(1+)
2009–2011	Ethnikos Piraeus	28+	(2+)
2011–2013	Thrasyvoulos	64	(6)
2013–2014	Ethnikos Piraeus		
- * Club domestic league appearances and goals

Georgios Syros (Greek: Γεώργιος Σύρος; born 8 February 1976) is a Greek retired footballer who last played for Ethnikos Piraeus in his home country.

== Career ==
Syros started his senior career with Akratitos. In 2001, he signed for Bury in the English Football League Second Division, making his debut against Wigan Athletic. made ten appearances, including in a 5–1 loss to Brentford and scored one goal. After that, he played for Greek clubs AO Kerkyra, Thrasyvoulos, Kallithea, and Ethnikos Piraeus before retiring.
