= Ivan Nedeljković =

Serbian footballer

Personal information
- Full name: Ivan Nedeljković
- Date of birth: 15 May 1978 (age 48)
- Place of birth: Beograd, SR Serbia, SFR Yugoslavia
- Height: 1.80 m (5 ft 11 in)
- Position: Attacking midfielder

Youth career
- 1991-1996: Partizan Belgrade

Senior career*
Years	Team	Apps	(Gls)
1997–1998	Rad Beograd	1	(0)
1998–2000	AO Karditsa	53	(14)
2000	Panelefsiniakos	11	(3)
2001	Ethnikos Asteras	9	(1)
2001–2002	Panegialios	12	(3)
2002	Paniliakos	14	(2)
2003–2004	Rodos	29	(9)
2004–2006	AEL	38	(5)
2006–2007	Chaidari	25	(7)
2007	Egaleo	15	(2)
2007–2008	Kavala	0	(2)
2008–2009	Agia Paraskevi	27	(7)
2009–2010	AE Irakliou	27	(0)
2010–2011	Trachones Alimos	27	(0)

Managerial career
- 2012–2014: Agia Paraskevi
- 2014–2015: Trachones Alimou U19
- 2015a: Trachones Alimou (caretaker)
- 2015b: Triglia Rafinas
- 2015–2016: AEK Athens U15
- 2016–2017: AEK Athens U16
- 2017–2022: AEK Athens U17
- 2023: AE Ermionidas
- 2023–2024: Aris Patras
- 2024–: AEK Athens Academy
- * Club domestic league appearances and goals

Ivan Nedeljković (Serbian Cyrillic: Иван Недељковић, born 15 May 1978) is a Serbian former professional footballer who played as an attacking midfielder. He works at AEK Athens Academy.

== Playing career ==
Born in Belgrade, Serbia, Nedeljković began his playing career in Serbia with Rad Beograd before moving to Greece to play with Karditsa F.C. in July 1998. He had a brief spell with Panelefsiniakos before joining Ethnikos Asteras for whom he would make nine Alpha Ethniki appearances. He would spend most of the rest of his career in Greek football, including stints with Panegialios, Paniliakos and Rodos. He would additional appearances in the Super League Greece with AEL and Egaleo.
