= Sokratis Petrou =

Greek footballer (born 1979)

Personal information
- Full name: Sokratis Petrou
- Date of birth: 8 May 1979 (age 47)
- Place of birth: Loutraki, Greece
- Height: 1.75 m (5 ft 9 in)
- Position: Midfielder

Senior career*
Years	Team	Apps	(Gls)
1998–1999	Aiolikos	20	(0)
1999–2006	Skoda Xanthi	38	(0)
1999–2000	→ Egaleo (loan)	26	(3)
2000–2001	→ Egaleo (loan)	12	(1)
2004	→ Niki Volou (loan)	7	(0)
2005–2006	→ AE Paphos (loan)	24	(0)
2006	Ayia Napa	13	(0)
2007	Agrotikos Asteras	17	(1)
2007–2009	Olympiakos Loutraki		
2009–2010	Agia Paraskevi	42	(0)
2011	Rouf	11	(0)
2011–2012	Vyzas Megara	27	(0)
2012	Paniliakos	3	(0)
2013–2015	Loutraki		

International career
–	Greece U21	8	(0)
- * Club domestic league appearances and goals

Sokratis Petrou (Greek: Σωκράτης Πέτρου; born 8 May 1979) is a Greek former footballer who played as a midfielder.

== Career ==
Petrou began playing football as a defensive midfielder for Aiolikos F.C. in the Gamma Ethniki. In 1999, he signed with Skoda Xanthi, where he would make 38 Alpha Ethniki appearances in seven seasons with the club. Xanthi sent him on loan to Beta Ethniki sides Egaleo F.C. and Niki Volos F.C. as well as Cypriot Second Division club AEP Paphos F.C., as he never became a first-team regular.

After being released by Xanthi, Petrou joined newly promoted Cypriot First Division side Ayia Napa F.C. for six months. He returned to Greece to play for Agrotikos Asteras F.C. in the second half of the 2006–07 Beta Ethniki season. Next, he dropped down to the Delta Ethniki to play two seasons with Olympiakos Loutraki.

Petrou returned to the Gamma Ethniki with Agia Paraskevi F.C. in July 2009. He also played for Rouf, Vyzas and Paniliakos F.C.
