= Robinho (footballer, born 1977) =

Brazilian footballer

Personal information
- Full name: Robson Pereira de Andrade
- Date of birth: July 29, 1977 (age 49)
- Place of birth: Araguari, Brazil
- Height: 1.75 m (5 ft 9 in)
- Position: Defender

Senior career*
Years	Team	Apps	(Gls)
2005–2008	Kavala		
2008–2009	Panthrakikos		
2009–2010	Doxa Drama		
- * Club domestic league appearances and goals

Robson Pereira de Andrade (born July 29, 1977), known as Robinho, is a Brazilian former professional footballer who played as a defender. After playing for Kavala F.C. for three years, he signed with Panthrakikos. He played there for five years in Gamma Ethniki and then promoted to the Beta Ethniki. Then a new promotion with Panthrakikos gave him the chance to play in Super League.
