= Ernesto Gómez (footballer, born 1982) =

Spanish footballer

Personal information
- Full name: Ernesto Gómez Sánchez
- Date of birth: 5 March 1982 (age 44)
- Place of birth: Murcia, Spain
- Positions: Midfielder; forward

Senior career*
Years	Team	Apps	(Gls)
-2002	Real Madrid Castilla	36	(5)
2002-2003	Toledo	24	(4)
2003-2004	Mallorca B	21	(1)
2004-2005	Girona	27	(1)
2005-2006	Real Valladolid Promesas	21	(1)
- Horadada
- Binéfar
2009–2010	Niki Volos		
2010–2011	Veria	8	(1)
- Cieza
	Catarroja	1+	(0+)
	Torrevieja	13+	(2+)
-2014	Horadada	8+	(2+)
2015	Orihuela	24	(0)
2016	Hong Kong Rangers	7	(4)
2016	Mar Menor	1+	(1+)
2017	Cieza	14	(2)
2017	Pinatar	11	(0)
- * Club domestic league appearances and goals

Ernesto Gómez Sánchez (born 5 March 1982) is a Spanish former footballer who is last known to have played as a midfielder or forward for Pinatar.

== Career ==
As a youth player, Gómez joined the youth academy of Real Madrid, Spain's most successful club.

In 2002, he signed for Toledo in the Spanish third division from the reserves of Real Madrid.

In 2006, he signed for Spanish fourth division side Horadada.

In 2009, Gómez signed for Niki Volos in the Greek lower leagues.

In 2010, he signed for Greek second division team Veria, where he made 9 appearances and scored 1 goal.

In 2015, Gómez signed for Orihuela in the Spanish fourth division after a trial and playing for Spanish fifth division outfit Horadada.

Before the second half of 2015/16, he signed for Hong Kong Rangers in Hong Kong after being released by Orihuela.
