= Charalampos Kokolis =

Greek footballer

Personal information
- Full name: Charalampos Kokolis
- Date of birth: 21 January 1985 (age 41)
- Place of birth: Lefkas, Greece
- Height: 1.72 m (5 ft 7 1/2 in)
- Positions: Winger; full-back

Team information
- Current team: Panelefsiniakos

Senior career*
Years	Team	Apps	(Gls)
2004–2008	Anagennisi Arta	73	(2)
2008–2009	Kavala	0	(0)
2009	→ Apollon Kalamarias (loan)	3	(0)
2009–2011	Ethnikos Asteras	0	(0)
2010	→ Saronikos (loan)	3	(1)
2011	Tilikratis	3	(0)
2011–2012	Acharnaikos	20	(2)
2012–2013	Vyzas Megara	11	(0)
2013–	Panelefsiniakos	8	(1)
- * Club domestic league appearances and goals

Charalampos Kokolis (Greek: Χαράλαμπος Κοκόλης; born 21 January 1985) is a Greek football player who currently plays for Greek Football League 2 side Panelefsiniakos
