= Dušan Vidojević =

Serbian footballer

Personal information
- Full name: Dušan Vidojević
- Date of birth: 6 April 1979 (age 47)
- Place of birth: Belgrade, SFR Yugoslavia
- Height: 1.77 m (5 ft 9 1/2 in)
- Position: Winger

Senior career*
Years	Team	Apps	(Gls)
2001–2002	Rad	20	(3)
2002–2003	PAS Giannina	21	(0)
2004	Kerkyra		
2005–2006	Panachaiki		
2006	Jedinstvo Ub	12	(0)
2006	Braşov	9	(1)
2007–2008	Voždovac	35	(1)
2008	Banat Zrenjanin	13	(1)
2009	Beograd	10	(2)
2009–2010	Sloga Kraljevo	12	(1)
- * Club domestic league appearances and goals

Dušan Vidojević (born 6 April 1979) is a retired footballer who played as a midfielder.

== Club career ==
Born in Belgrade, Vidojević began playing football with FK Rad in the First League of Serbia and Montenegro.

Vidojević moved to Greece in July 2002, joining Greek first division side PAS Giannina F.C., making 21 top flight league appearances for the club. He would also play for Kerkyra and Panachaiki in the Greek second division. He also had a brief spell with FC Brașov in the Romanian second division.

He returned to Serbia and played for FK Voždovac and FK Banat Zrenjanin in the Serbian Superliga.
