= Polychronis Vezyridis =

German-born Greek footballer

Personal information
- Date of birth: 30 November 1974 (age 51)
- Place of birth: Solingen, West Germany
- Height: 1.84 m (6 ft 1/2 in)
- Position: Goalkeeper

Senior career*
| Years | Team | Apps | (Gls) |
| 1994–1998 | Doxa Drama | 53 | (0) |
| 1998–2001 | Athinaikos | 73 | (0) |
| 2001–2002 | Ethnikos Piraeus | 27 | (0) |
| 2002–2003 | Athinaikos | 28 | (0) |
| 2003–2006 | Kerkyra | 62 | (0) |
| 2006–2007 | Panserraikos | 26 | (0) |
| 2007–2009 | Olympiacos Volos | 56 | (0) |
| 2009–2012 | OFI | 82 | (0) |
- * Club domestic league appearances and goals as of 17:39, 14 March 2012 (UTC)

Polychronis Vezyridis (Greek: Πολυχρόνης Βεζυρίδης, born 30 November 1974) is a retired Greek professional football goalkeeper who last played for Super League side OFI. He was born in Solingen.
