= Ilias Botaitis =

Greek footballer (born 1979)

Personal information
- Date of birth: 21 September 1979 (age 47)
- Place of birth: Greece
- Position: Midfielder

Senior career*
Years	Team	Apps	(Gls)
1997–1999	Pierikos	29	(0)
1999–2001	Ethnikos Asteras	30	(0)
2001	→ Panelefsiniakos (loan)	8	(0)
2001–2004	Paniliakos	69	(0)
2004	Panserraikos	14	(1)
2005	Ethnikos Asteras	14	(1)
2006	Panthrakikos	7	(0)
2006–2007	Proodeftiki	13	(0)
2007–2008	Ag. Dimitrios	21	(0)
2008–2010	Aspropyrgos Enosis	30	(1)
2010	Pontioi Katerini	16	(1)
2011	Aspropyrgos Enosis	9	(0)
2011	Vataniakos	6	(0)
2012–2013	Aiginiakos	11	(0)

Managerial career
- 2025: Ermis Exochi
- * Club domestic league appearances and goals as of 1 July 2011

Ilias Botaitis (Greek: Ηλίας Μποταΐτης; born 29 September 1979) is a Greek former professional footballer who played as a midfielder.

== Career ==
Born in Greece, Botaitis began playing professional football with the Pierikos in the Gamma Ethniki. During his career, he appeared in 36 Alpha Ethniki, 110 Beta Ethniki and 67 Gamma Ethniki matches with Pierikos, Ethnikos Asteras, Panelefsiniakos F.C., Paniliakos, Panserraikos F.C., Panthrakikos F.C., Proodeftiki F.C. and Ag. Dimitrios F.C., before retiring from professional football in February 2012.
