= Georgios Provatas =

Greek footballer

Personal information
- Date of birth: 23 February 1976 (age 50)
- Place of birth: Kerkyra, Greece
- Height: 1.93 m (6 ft 4 in)
- Position: Defender

Senior career*
Years	Team	Apps	(Gls)
–2000	Egaleo		
2001	Athinaikos		
2001–2002	Egaleo		
2002–2005	Kerkyra		
2005	Vyzas		
2006–2007	Fostiras		
2007–2008	Agia Paraskevi		
2008	Agios Ierotheos		
2009–2010	Proodeftiki		
2010–2011	Nea Ionia		
- * Club domestic league appearances and goals

Georgios Provatas (Greek: Γεώργιος Προβατάς; born 23 February 1976) is a retired Greek football defender.
