= Javier Malagueño =

Argentine footballer

Personal information
- Full name: Javier Hernán Malagueño
- Date of birth: 27 October 1982 (age 44)
- Place of birth: Cosquín, Córdoba, Argentina
- Height: 1.85 m (6 ft 1 in)
- Position: Defender

Team information
- Current team: Estudiantes de Altamira
- Number: 3

Senior career*
Years	Team	Apps	(Gls)
2001–2002	Olimpo	4	(0)
2003	Racing	0	(0)
2003–2005	Huracán TA	64	(0)
2005–2007	Talleres	48	(1)
2007–2008	Iraklis	28	(4)
2008–2010	Indios	54	(2)
2010–2012	Málaga	0	(0)
2012–2013	Tigre	5	(0)
2013–2015	Atlético Tucumán	56	(3)
2015–	Estudiantes de Altamira	11	(0)
- * Club domestic league appearances and goals as of 27 April 2015

Javier Hernán Malagueño (born 27 October 1982 in Cosquín, Córdoba) is an Argentinian professional footballer who currently plays for Estudiantes de Altamira of the Ascenso MX in Mexico.
