= Panagiotis Petras =

Greek footballer (born 1983)

Personal information
- Date of birth: 15 November 1983 (age 42)
- Place of birth: Heraklion, Greece
- Height: 1.77 m (5 ft 10 in)
- Position: Midfielder

Senior career*
| Years | Team | Apps | (Gls) |
| 2003–2004 | OFI | | |
| 2004–2007 | Kerkyra | | |
| 2007–2009 | Ethnikos Piraeus | | |
| 2009–2010 | OFI | | |
| 2010–2011 | Niki Volos | | |
| 2012 | Mandraikos | | |
| 2012–2015 | Rouvas | | |
| 2015–2017 | Atsaleniou | | |
- * Club domestic league appearances and goals

Panagiotis Petras (Greek: Παναγιώτης Πετράς; born 14 November 1983) is a Greek former professional footballer who played as a midfielder.
