= Giorgos Zacharopoulos =

Greek footballer

Personal information
- Full name: Georgios Zacharopoulos
- Date of birth: 13 December 1971 (age 54)
- Place of birth: Athens, Greece
- Height: 1.85 m (6 ft 1 in)
- Position: Forward

Senior career*
Years	Team	Apps	(Gls)
1994–1996	Ethnikos Asteras		
1996–1998	Panetolikos		
1998–1999	Ethnikos Asteras	17	(2)
1999–2001	Kallithea		
2001–2005	Chalkidona		
2005–2006	Atromitos		
2006–2007	Kerkyra	10	(3)
2007–2009	Fostiras		
2009	Enosi Aspropyrgou		
2010	Vyzas		
2010–2011	Thrasyvoulos		
2011–2012	Apollon Smyrnis		
2012–2013	Panelefsiniakos		
2013–2014	Proodeftiki		
- * Club domestic league appearances and goals

Giorgos Zacharopoulos (Greek: Γιώργος Ζαχαρόπουλος; born 13 December 1971) is a Greek former professional footballer who played as a forward.
