= Agia Triada, Thessaloniki =

Agia Triada Αγία Τριάδα
- Community
- Location within Greece
- Coordinates: 40°30′N 22°52.6′E
- Country: Greece
- Administrative region: Central Macedonia
- Regional unit: Thessaloniki
- Municipality: Thermaikos
- Municipal unit: Thermaikos

Area
  - Community: 5.075 km^{2} (1.959 sq mi)
- Elevation: 10 m (33 ft)

Population (2021)
  - Community: 1,990
  - Density: 392/km^{2} (1,020/sq mi)
- Time zone: UTC+2 (EET)
  - Summer (DST): UTC+3 (EEST)
- Postal code: 546 39
- Area code: +30-2392
- Vehicle registration: NA to NX

Agia Triada (Greek: Αγία Τριάδα) is a village and a community of the Thermaikos municipality. Before the 2011 local government reform it was part of the municipality of Thermaikos, of which it was a municipal district. The 2021 census recorded 1,990 inhabitants in the village. The community of Agia Triada covers an area of 5.075 km^{2}.

== See also ==
- List of settlements in the Thessaloniki regional unit
