= Giannis Sotirhos =

Greek footballer

Personal information
- Date of birth: 6 April 1977 (age 49)
- Place of birth: Kapareli, Greece
- Height: 1.83 m (6 ft 0 in)
- Position: Defender

Team information
- Current team: Olympiacos Volos
- Number: 3

Senior career*
Years	Team	Apps	(Gls)
–	Levadiakos		
–	Poseidon Michaniona		
–	Nafpaktiakos Asteras		
2001–2004	Paniliakos	25	(5)
2004–2005	Chalkidona	23	(2)
2005–2006	Atromitos	24	(0)
2006–2007	Ionikos	9	(0)
2007–2009	Thrasyvoulos		
2009–	Olympiacos Volos		
- * Club domestic league appearances and goals as of 1 June 2008

Giannis Sotirhos (Greek: Γιάννης Σωτήρχος, born 6 April 1977) is a Greek professional association football defender who plays for Olympiacos Volos in the Greek Second Division.
