= Hersonissos F.C. =

Hersonissos
- Founded: 1979 as Olimpiakos Sindesmos Filathlon Chersonissou
- Ground: Chersonissos Municipal Stadium; Chersonissos, Crete, Greece
- Capacity: 1,000
- Chairman: Georgios Delis
- Manager: Petros Marinakis
- League: Gamma Ethniki
- 2025–26: Heraklion FCA Α1 Division, 2nd (promoted)

Hersonissos (Greek: Χερσόνησος), previously known as Olimpiakos Sindesmos Filathlon Chersonissou (Greek: Ολυμπιακός Σύνδεσμος Φιλάθλων Χερσονήσου), is a Greek football club based in Chersonisos, Crete in Greece. The club was founded in 1979. They currently compete in the Gamma Ethniki and host their home games in the Hersonissos Municipal Stadium.

== History ==
Old crest (1979–2019).

For several years, Hersonissos played in the Delta Ethniki, the (now defunct) fourth tier of the Greek football league system. In 2008, Hersonissos won the Delta Ethniki Group 10 championship, earning promotion to the Gamma Ethniki for the first time in the club's history. They played for three straight seasons in the Gamma Ethniki, managing an all-time best sixth-place finish during the 2009−10 edition of the competition. However, in 2011 they were relegated back to the Delta Ethniki. The club's decline proved to be ongoing, as Hersonissos faced two consecutive demotions, first to the regional Heraklion Football Clubs Association A1 Division, and immediately the next season, to the lower A2 FCA Championship.

Throughout its history, Hersonissos has won the Heraklion FCA A1 Division twice, while also managing to reach the Greek Football Amateur Cup Final once in 1999, losing the title 3−2 at extra time to Chalkidon / Near-East.

== Stadium ==
Hersonissos hosts its home matches at the Hersonissos Municipal Stadium. The stadium currently has a seating capacity of 1,000.

== Honours ==
=== National ===
- Delta Ethniki
  - Winners: 2007−08 (Group 10)

=== Regional ===
- Heraklion FCA Championship
  - Winners (2): 1992−93, 1999−00
- Heraklion FCA Cup
  - Winners (2): 1998−99, 2025–26
