= Visaltiakos Nigrita F.C. =

Visaltiakos
- Full name: Visaltiakos Nigritas Football Club
- Founded: 1998
- Dissolved: 2011
- Ground: Municipal Athletic Center Nigrita
- Capacity: 1,000
| Home colours | Away colours |

Visaltiakos Football Club was a Greek football club, based in Nigrita, Serres Prefecture, Central Macedonia.

The association was founded in 1998. In 2009, they promoted to Gamma Ethniki.
