= Giannis Tzelepis =

Greek footballer (born 1984)

Personal information
- Full name: Ioannis Tzelepis
- Date of birth: 4 January 1984 (age 42)
- Place of birth: Greece
- Height: 1.82 m (6 ft 0 in)
- Position: Centre-back

Youth career
- –1999: Viktoria Aschaffenburg

Senior career*
Years	Team	Apps	(Gls)
1999–2005	Emmen		
2005–2006	Viktoria Aschaffenburg	28	(1)
2006–2007	OF Ierapetra		
2007–2008	Polykastro	2	(1)
2008–2009	Alexandroupoli	50	(2)
2009	Fokikos		
2009–2010	Eordaikos	3	(1)
2010–2011	Nafpaktiakos Asteras	1	(0)
2011–2012	Anagennisi Ierapetra	8	(0)
2012–2013	Vyzas Megara	33	(0)
2013–2020	OF Ierapetra		
- * Club domestic league appearances and goals as of 08:51, 31 March 2020 (UTC)

Giannis Tzelepis (Greek: Γιάννης Τζελέπης; born 4 January 1984) is a Greek former professional footballer who played as a centre-back.

== Career ==
Born in Greece, Tzelepis played for German side Viktoria Aschaffenburg. On 1 July 1999, he joined the Dutch side Emmen appearing in Eerste Divisie and stayed for Dutch side until 2005. He exclusively played for Greek clubs after 2006.

Then Tzelepis was signed by the German side Aschaffenburg, but this time to cap him in senior squad for 28 times, securing his first goal for the club. He followed a transfer to O.F. Ierapetra in 2006 to play in Football League. This involved the first ever participation of Tzelepis in Greek Football Leagues . He then signed a contract of one year with Greek club playing in Greece namely Polykastro F.C. and remained for the club until 2008 appearing twice and secured his maiden club goal. In the mid of 2008 Giannpoulos signed a year spell with the Greece side Enosi Alexandroupoli. He accumulated humongous 50 caps and netted the ball twice. and in 2009 he was at Fokikos. He penned a deal with Greek club Eordaikos securing 3 appearances for the club and netted the ball maidenly.

He then moved to Nafpaktiakos Asteras in 2010 and a transfer to side Anagennisi Ierapetra followed.

From 2011, he played for Ierapetra-based football club namely Anagennisi Ierapetra and further moved to Vyzas in 2012 where the defender earned 33 caps for the club. In 2013, he moved to Vyzas

Finally, Tzelepis is playing in Greece for O.F. Ierapetra also acting as a skipper of the side.

He had featured in Hessenliga, the top tier of Hesse in Germany, Football League and 5 times in Greek Football Cup or Kypello Elladas (Greek).
