= APS Anagennisi Neoi Epivates F.C. =

Anagennisi Neoi Epivates
- Full name: Athlitikos Podosfairikos Syllogos Neon Epivaton "I Anagennisi"
- Founded: 1928 (P.A.O.N.E.); 2021 (APS Anagennisi Neoi Epivates)
- Ground: Neoi Epivates Stadium; Neoi Epivates, Greece
- Capacity: 1,090
- Chairman: Evangelos Misichronis
- Manager: Georgios Myrtsos
- League: Macedonia FCA Second Division
- 2025–26: Macedonia FCA Second Division (Group 3), 9th
Home colours	Away colours

APS Anagennisi Neoi Epivates F.C. (Greek: Α.Π.Σ. Αναγέννηση Νέων Επιβατών), full name Athlitikos Podosfairikos Syllogos Neon Epivaton "I Anagennisi" (Αθλητικός Ποδοσφαιρικός Σύλλογος Νέων Επιβατών «η Αναγέννηση», Athletic Football Club of Neoi Epivates "Rebirth"), is a football club based in Neoi Epivates (also known as Baxe Tsifliki), Thessaloniki, Macedonia, Greece. The club was officially founded in 1928 and is black and white. It belongs to the power of the Macedonia Football Clubs Association and is competing in the Second Division. They have competed in the local and national championships.

== History ==
=== P.A.O.N.E. (1928–2021) ===
It was founded in 1928 at the Neoi Epivates of Thessaloniki, also known as Baxe Tsifliki. Both the team and the settlement of Neoi Epivates founded refugees from the Passengers of Eastern Thrace. Since its founding, it has dominated the soccer field of the wider region and since the 1950s has also developed intense cultural activity, performing various historical gatherings, staging plays and hosting various touring troupes. 2018 marks the 90th anniversary of the club officially. 1963 was officially recognized by the HFF. with registration number 1000 and joined the Macedonia Football Clubs Association, starting its official football career in the 1963–64 season. In 1972 it was the first in the Macedonia Football Clubs Association. Macedonia and in 1983 won the championship and promotion to the Delta Ethniki. In 1989 he celebrated the rise to Gamma Ethniki, where he will remain for three consecutive seasons. The team was led by Nikolaidis Giannis. In 1989-90 he was ranked 4th with top scorer George Behlivanis (10 goals), 1990-91 8th and the next season will be relegated to 15th.

2006 won his group championship in the Delta Ethniki and returned to the Gamma Ethniki after a long absence and remained for 4 years. In the 2006–07 season he finished 12th with 38 points. The following year coached by Giannis Michalitsos ranked 3rd with 59 points, while in the 2008–09 season he remained on the top floor of the class finishing in fifth place. He finished 14th in the 2009–10 season and was relegated to the Delta Ethniki. A second consecutive relegation came next season and from 2011 to 2012 he is competing in the EPS Championship. Macedonia. In 2019 he returned to the A1 Macedonia Football Clubs Association after four years.

=== APS Anagennisi Neoi Epivates (2021–present) ===
During the 2021–22 season, the newly established team APS Anagennisi Neoi Epivates competed in the third Division of the Macedonia FCA, where it secured first place and earned promotion to the third Division of the Macedonia FCA, where it played until the 2023–24 season.

== Honours ==
As P.A.O.N.E. until 2021

- Delta Ethniki: 2005–06
- Macedonia FCA First Division: 1982–83, 1999–2000, 2004–05
- Macedonia FCA Second Division: 1971–72
