= Fyli Municipal Stadium =

Multi-purpose stadium in Fyli, Greece

Fyli stadium
- Interactive map of Fyli stadium
- Location: Fyli, Attica, Greece
- Coordinates: 38°5′46.75″N 23°39′04.48″E
- Operator: Thrasyvoulos F.C.
- Capacity: 4,000
- Surface: Grass

Construction
- Built: 1989

Tenant
- Thrasyvoulos F.C.

Fyli Stadium is a multi-purpose stadium in Fyli northeastern corner of the West Attica regional unit, Greece. It is currently used mostly for football matches and is the home stadium of Thrasyvoulos F.C. The stadium holds 4,000 and was built in 1989.
