= Thrasyvoulos F.C. =

Thrasyvoulos
- Full name: Thrasyvoulos Fylis Football Club
- Founded: 1938; 88 years ago
- Ground: Fyli Municipal Stadium
- Capacity: 3,142
- Chairman: Stamatis Avramis
- Manager: Ioannis Katsikis
- League: West Attica FCA Second Division
- 2025–26: West Attica FCA Second Division, 10th
| Home colours | Away colours |

Thrasyvoulos Football Club (Greek: Α.Ο. Θρασύβουλος Φυλής) is a Greek football club based in Fyli, Attica, currently in the West Attica FCA Second Division. Its official year of foundation is recorded as 1938, and its colors are green and white. The club is a founding member of the West Attica Football Clubs Association.

== History ==
Athlitikos Omilos Thrasyvoulos Fyli was founded in 1938 and its colours are green and white. It is a founding member of the West Attica Football Clubs Association. The club was named in honor of the Athenian general Thrasybulus, who in 403 BC, leading a small group of supporters from his base at the Fortress of Phyle, captured Piraeus and subsequently Athens, overthrowing the regime of the Thirty Tyrants and restoring democracy to his homeland.

From 1938 to 1961, Thrasyvoulos competed as an unofficial club. The earliest known matches of the team were played in October 1938 against unofficial clubs: Ethnikos Petralona (a 1–1 draw) and Napolitanoi Plaka (a 9–0 victory). During the same period, Astrapi Chasia was also mentioned.

It was in 1962 that the club was officially recognized by the Court, earning the right to compete initially in the leagues of the Athens FCA and subsequently in the National Amateur Division.

Until the early 1990s, the club alternated between the Second and Third Divisions of the Athens Football Clubs Association. During the 1992–93 season, it won the Athens FCA Second Division Championship, earning promotion to the Athens FCA First Division for the first time in its history. During the 1997–98 season, a series of significant successes began for the club, providing momentum for its rise toward the Alpha Ethniki. Specifically, that year it won the Athens FCA First Division Championship, the following year it was a finalist in the Athens FCA Cup, and during the 2000–01 season it won both the Athens FCA Cup and the Greek Football Amateur Cup.

In addition, during the following 2001–02 season, the club reached the Athens FCA Cup final for the third consecutive time. During the same season (2001–02), it managed to secure promotion to the professional leagues by placing first in Group 1 of Delta Ethniki. At the same time, the club was legally incorporated as a P.A.E. (FC) on 9 July 2002.

Three years later, in June 2005, Thrasyvoulos was crowned champion of the South Group of Gamma Ethniki, earning promotion to Beta Ethniki. Its major goal of achieving promotion to Super League was accomplished in 2008, after finishing in second place in the championship, while in the Greek Cup it reached the semi-final stage, defeating opponents such as PAOK (4–2 in Fyli). In Alpha Ethniki, its notable highlight was a 3–3 draw against AEK Athens at the Fyli Stadium. The following 2009–10 season found Thrasyvoulos back in Beta Ethniki; however, the highlight of that year was a 1–0 extra-time victory and elimination of AEK Athens in the fourth round of the Greek Cup.

During the 2012–13 season, Thrasyvoulos finished second from the bottom in the Beta Ethniki championship and, despite being relegated to Gamma Ethniki, chose not to register for the following season's division, opting instead to compete in the local championship after 15 consecutive years of presence in the national divisions.

During the 2022–23 season, the club did not participate in any competition. Since the 2023–24 season, it has been competing in the Second Division of the West Attica Football Clubs Association.

== Stadium ==
The home ground of Thrasyvoulos is the Fyli Municipal Stadium, located at the foothills of Mount Parnitha, approximately 15 km from the center of Athens. The stadium was built in 1989 and served as one of the official training venues for the 2004 Summer Olympics. The stadium's capacity is 3,142 seated spectators. The stadium's attendance record was set on 19 February 2006 in a match between Thrasyvoulos and Aris, with 2,820 tickets sold.

== Honours ==
=== National ===
- Gamma Ethniki (1): 2004–05
- Delta Ethniki (1): 2001–02
- Greek Football Amateur Cup (1): 2001

=== Regional ===
- Athens FCA First Division (1): 1997–98
- Athens FCA Cup (1): 2000–01
