= Neoi Epivates =

Town in Greece

Neoi Epivates Νέοι Επιβάτες
- Community
- Location within Greece
- Coordinates: 40°30′04″N 22°54′32″E
- Country: Greece
- Administrative region: Central Macedonia
- Regional unit: Thessaloniki
- Municipality: Thermaikos
- Municipal unit: Thermaikos

Population (2021)
  - Community: 5,882
- Time zone: UTC+2 (EET)
  - Summer (DST): UTC+3 (EEST)

Neoi Epivates (Greek: Νέοι Επιβάτες) is a small suburban town outside Thessaloniki, next to Peraia. It is part of the municipality of Thermaikos in the Thessaloniki regional unit. The origin of the settlement was the arrival of 631 refugees from the town Epivates in Eastern Thrace as a result of the Greco-Turkish War (1919–22).

It was formerly known in Turkish as Bahçe Çiflik (Greek: Μπαξέ Τσιφλίκι), mentioned also in a popular song of Vassilis Tsitsanis.
