= 2010–11 Greek Football Cup =

2010–11 Greek Cup
Tournament details
- Country: Greece
- Teams: 67

Final positions
- Champions: AEK Athens (14th title)
- Runners-up: Atromitos
- UEFA Europa League: AEK Athens

Tournament statistics
- Matches played: 68
- Goals scored: 147 (2.16 per match)
- Top goal scorer(s): Dimitris Kafes; Ismael Blanco (4 goals each)

The 2010–11 Greek Football Cup was the 69th edition of the Greek Football Cup. A total of 67 clubs had been accepted to enter, after the withdrawal of Egaleo, Kalamata and Pyrsos Grevena and their relegation to Delta Ethniki. The competition commenced on 4 September 2010 with the First Round and concluded on 30 April 2011 with the final, held at Olympic Stadium. The final was contested by Atromitos and AEK Athens, with AEK winning 3–0.

== Teams ==
Round	Clubs remaining	Clubs involved	Winners from previous round	New entries	Leagues entering
First Round	67	30	none	30	Football League 2 (former Gamma Ethniki)
Second Round	52	36	15 + 3 that qualified without matches	21	Football League (former Beta Ethniki)
Additional Round	34	4	4	none	none
Round of 32	32	32	14 from Second Round + 2 from Additional Round	16	Super League
Round of 16	16	16	16	none	none
Quarter-finals	8	8	8	none	none
Semi-finals	4	4	4	none	none
Final	2	2	2	none	none

== Calendar ==
Round	Date(s)	Fixtures	Clubs	New entries
First Round	4, 5 September 2010	15	67 → 52	30
Second Round	15, 16 September 2010	18	52 → 34	21
Additional Round	29 September 2010	2	34 → 32	none
Round of 32	26–28 October, 3 November 2010	16	32 → 16	16
Round of 36	21–23 December 2010 & 12 January 2011	10	16 → 8	none
Quarter-finals	18–20 January & 2, 3 February 2011	4	8 → 4	none
Semi-finals	2, 16 March 2011	2	4 → 2	none
Final	30 April 2011	1	2 → 1	none

== Participating clubs ==
The following 67 teams competed in First Round:

2010–11 Super League	2010–11 Football League	2010–11 Football League 2
Panathinaikos; PAOK; AEK Athens; Aris; Olympiacos; Kavala; Atromitos; AEL; Panionios; Iraklis; Ergotelis; Asteras Tripolis; Skoda Xanthi; Olympiacos Volos; Kerkyra; Panserraikos	Levadiakos; PAS Giannina; Panthrakikos; OFI; Ethnikos Piraeus; Pierikos; Panetolikos; Diagoras; Ilioupoli; Agrotikos Asteras; Ethnikos Asteras; Anagennisi Karditsa; Thrasyvoulos; Doxa Drama; Ionikos; Kallithea; Veria; Trikala	AEL Kalloni; Aetos Skydra; Agia Paraskevi; Aias Salamina; Anagennisi Epanomi; Anagennisi Giannitsa; Apollon Athens; Aspropyrgos Enosis; Chania; Chersonissos; Doxa Kranoula; Eordaikos 2007; Ethnikos Filippiada; Fokikos; Iraklis Psachna; Keravnos Keratea; Korinthos; Kozani; Makedonikos; Megas Alexandros Irakleia; Nafpaktiakos Asteras; Niki Volos; Odysseas Anagennisi; Panachaiki 2005; Panegialios; Paniliakos; Platanias; Pontioi Katerini; Rodos; PAO Rouf; Tyrnavos 2005; Vyzas; Zakynthos

== Knockout phase ==
Each tie in the knockout phase, apart from the quarter-finals and the semi-finals, was played by a single match. If the score was level at the end of normal time, extra time was played, followed by a penalty shoot-out if the score was still level. In the quarter-finals and the semi-finals were played over two legs, with each team playing one leg at home. The team that scored more goals on aggregate over the two legs advanced to the next round. If the aggregate score was level, the away goals rule was applied, i.e. the team that scored more goals away from home over the two legs advanced. If away goals were also equal, then extra time was played. The away goals rule was again applied after extra time, i.e. if there were goals scored during extra time and the aggregate score was still level, the visiting team advanced by virtue of more away goals scored. If no goals were scored during extra time, the winners were decided by a penalty shoot-out. In the round of 16, if the score was level at the end of normal time the two-legged rule was applied.
The mechanism of the draws for each round is as follows:

- In the draw for the second round, the teams from the second division are seeded and the winners from the first round were unseeded. The seeded teams are drawn against the unseeded teams.
- In the draw for the Round of 32, the teams from the first division are seeded and the winners from the previous rounds were unseeded. The seeded teams are drawn against the unseeded teams.
- In the draws for the Round of 16 onwards, there are no seedings and teams from the different group can be drawn against each other.

== First round ==
The draw for this round took place on 18 August 2010.

=== Summary ===
Team 1	Score	Team 2
4 September 2010
Megas Alexandros Irakleia	1–1 (3–0 p)	Paniliakos
Keravnos Keratea	0–1	Apollon Athens
Kalloni	0–1	Aetos Skydra
Niki Volos	2–3 (a.e.t.)	PAO Rouf
Rodos	1–0	Nafpaktiakos Asteras
5 September 2010
Odysseas Anagennisi	1–0	Makedonikos
Anagennisi Epanomi	1–0	Iraklis Psachna
Vyzas	0–2	Panachaiki 2005
Ethnikos Filippiada	0–1	Platanias
Doxa Kranoula	0–0 (4–3 p)	Fokikos
Aias Salamina	1–0 (a.e.t.)	Zakynthos
Agia Paraskevi	3–2	Chania
Korinthos	1–1 (6–7 p)	Tyrnavos 2005
Kozani	1–0	Aspropyrgos
Pontioi Katerini	1–2	Panegialios
N/A
Anagennisi Giannitsa	bye	
Eordaikos 2007	bye	
Hersonissos	bye	

=== Matches ===
4 September 2010
16:00 EEST

Megas Alexandros Irakleia	1–1 (a.e.t.)	Paniliakos
Moutidis 73'	Report	Georgopoulos 81'
Penalties
Kyrou (penalty scored); Mantzourakis (penalty scored); Tsemperidis (penalty scored)	3–0	(penalty missed) Antonopoulos; (penalty missed) Thoniatis; (penalty missed) Bris

Irakleia Stadium, Serres
Referee: Panagiotis Symeonidis (Pieria)

4 September 2010
16:00 EEST

Keravnos Keratea	0–1	Apollon Athens
	Report	Vermpis 27'

Antonis Priftis Stadium, Koropi
Referee: Kostas Karyofillis (Piraeus)

4 September 2010
16:00 EEST

Kalloni	0–1	Aetos Skydra
	Report	Samaropoulos 81'

Municipal Stadium of Mytilene, Mytilene
Referee: Kostas Galatsios (Macedonia)

4 September 2010
18:15 EEST

Niki Volos	2–3 (a.e.t.)	PAO Rouf
Vakouftsis 71', 88'	Report	Kafes 13'; Chalimourdas 81'; Souleles 104'

Neapoli Stadium, Volos
Referee: Michalis Antipariotis (East Attica)

4 September 2010
19:45 EEST

Rodos	1–0	Nafpaktiakos Asteras
Maragoudakis 6'	Report

Diagoras Stadium, Rhodes
Referee: Eleni Antoniou (East Attica)

5 September 2010
16:00 EEST

Odysseas Anagennisi	1–0	Makedonikos
Chourouzidis 52'	Report

Anagennisi Stadium, Anagennisi
Referee: Giorgos Kamarakis (Xanthi)

5 September 2010
16:00 EEST

Anagennisi Epanomi	1–0	Iraklis Psachna
Papatzikos 88'	Report

Nikos Sarafis Stadium, Thessaloniki
Referee: Ananias Fotiadis (Serres)

5 September 2010
16:00 EEST

Vyzas	0–2	Panachaiki 2005
	Report	Dinas 32'; Kyvelidis 37'

Megara Stadium, Megara
Referee: Dimitris Katsimingos (Athens)

5 September 2010
16:00 EEST

Ethnikos Filippiada	0–1	Platanias
	Report	Sotiropoulos 2'

Filippiada Stadium, Filippiada
Referee: Thanasis Tzilos (Larissa)

5 September 2010
16:00 EEST

Doxa Kranoula	0–0 (a.e.t.)	Fokikos
	Report
Penalties
Giakos (penalty missed); Chiras (penalty scored); Papavasiliou (penalty missed); Vatsis (penalty scored); Kosmas (penalty scored); Tasioulas (penalty missed); Bililis (penalty scored)	4–3	(penalty missed) Kostopoulos; (penalty scored) Dimitropoulos; (penalty scored) Skarimpas; (penalty scored) Kanellopoulos; (penalty missed) Vavatsikos; (penalty missed) Dimitriou; (penalty missed) Kotsaris

Igoumenitsa Stadium, Igoumenitsa
Referee: Konstantinos Panytsidis (Kozani)

5 September 2010
16:00 EEST

Aias Salamina	1–0 (a.e.t.)	Zakynthos
Raptopoulos 98'	Report

Perama Stadium, Perama
Referee: Iosif Sfakianakis (Athens)

5 September 2010
17:45 EEST

Agia Paraskevi	3–2	Chania
Michelis 50'; Sapalidis 53'; Makris 70'	Report	Andreadis 16'; Trichias 90+5'

Agia Paraskevi Stadium, Agia Paraskevi
Referee: Nikos Potoglou (Piraeus)

5 September 2010
18:15 EEST

Korinthos	1–1 (a.e.t.)	Tyrnavos 2005
Dimitriadis 107'	Report	Mouratidis 99'
Penalties
Dimitriadis (penalty scored); Ch. Pappas (penalty scored); Iakovakis (penalty missed); Pavlidis (penalty scored); Giannoulis (penalty scored); Filis (penalty scored); Fragakis (penalty scored); Dimarakis (penalty missed)	6–7	(penalty scored) K. Skoupras; (penalty scored) Georgantzias; (penalty scored) Siatras; (penalty scored) Kravaris; (penalty missed) K. Mangos; (penalty scored) Athanasoulis; (penalty scored) Christodoulou; (penalty scored) Karanastasis

Korinthos Stadium, Korinthos
Referee: Nikos Ratsiatos (Argolida)

5 September 2010
18:15 EEST

Kozani	1–0	Aspropyrgos
Govas 33'	Report

Municipal Athletic Center of Kozani, Kozani
Referee: Dimitris Maloutas (Imathia)

5 September 2010
18:15 EEST

Pontioi Katerini	1–2	Panegialios
Stafidas 3'	Report	Pelekis 20'; Kozanidis 70' (pen.)

Municipal Athletic Center of Katerini, Katerini
Referee: Vaggelis Gratsanis (Trikala)

== Second round ==
The draw for this round took place on 18 August 2010, after the First Round draw.

=== Summary ===
Team 1	Score	Team 2
15 September 2010
Anagennisi Giannitsa	2–2 (4–3 p)	Ionikos
Eordaikos 2007	1–0	Kallithea
Megas Alexandros Irakleia	0–1	Veria
Anagennisi Epanomi	0–1	Panetolikos
Platanias	0–1	Ilioupoli
Aetos Skydra	2–1	Anagennisi Karditsa
Kozani	1–0	Thrasyvoulos
Doxa Kranoula	1–3 (a.e.t.)	Ethnikos Piraeus
Panegialios	1–1 (0–3 p)	Trikala
Aias Salamina	0–0 (0–3 p)	Pierikos
Panachaiki 2005	1–0	Levadiakos
Hersonissos	1–2	OFI
Agia Paraskevi	0–1	Ethnikos Asteras
Rodos	0–1 (a.e.t.)	Diagoras
16 September 2010
Apollon Athens	1–3 (a.e.t.)	Panthrakikos
Odysseas Anagennisi	0–2	PAS Giannina
PAO Rouf	2–1 (a.e.t.)	Agrotikos Asteras
Tyrnavos 2005	0–0 (4–2 p)	Doxa Drama

=== Matches ===
15 September 2010
15:45 EEST

Anagennisi Giannitsa	2–2 (a.e.t.)	Ionikos
Hasanoglu 9'; Lamprogeorgos 118'	Report	Diallo 10', 107'
Penalties
Gourtsas (penalty scored); Soulidis (penalty missed); Hasanoglu (penalty missed); G. Iordanidis (penalty scored); Lamprogeorgos (penalty scored); Karamanlis (penalty scored)	4–3	(penalty scored) Diallo; (penalty scored) Konstantinidis; (penalty missed) Pasas; (penalty scored) Robinho; (penalty missed) Salto; (penalty missed) Petrou

Giannitsa Municipal Stadium, Giannitsa
Referee: Antonis Valliotis (Larissa)

15 September 2010
15:45 EEST

Eordaikos 2007	1–0	Kallithea
Chintzidis 60'	Report

Aimilios Theofanidis, Ptolemaida
Referee: Triantafyllos Tikas (Karditsa)

15 September 2010
15:45 EEST

Megas Alexandros Irakleia	0–1	Veria
	Report	Kaltsas 3'

Irakleia Stadium, Serres
Referee: Fotis Fotiadis (Kastoria)

15 September 2010
15:45 EEST

Anagennisi Epanomi	0–1	Panetolikos
	Report	Theodoridis 64'

Nikos Sarafis Stadium, Thessaloniki
Referee: Christos Granas (Thrace)

15 September 2010
15:45 EEST

Platanias	0–1	Ilioupoli
	Report	Nikolopoulos 8'

Perivolia Stadium, Chania
Referee: Giorgos Foukakis (Heraklion)

15 September 2010
15:45 EEST

Aetos Skydra	2–1	Anagennisi Karditsa
Kouloukidis 54' (pen.); Samaropoulos 80'	Report	Rodrigo 30'

Skydra Stadium, Skydra
Referee: Apostolos Simaiakis (Chalkidiki)

15 September 2010
15:45 EEST

Kozani	1–0	Thrasyvoulos
Vasiliou 9' (o.g.)	Report

Municipal Athletic Center of Kozani, Kozani
Referee: Alexandros Katsikogiannis (Epirus)

15 September 2010
15:45 EEST

Doxa Kranoula	1–3 (a.e.t.)	Ethnikos Piraeus
Król 26'	Report	Pastos 52'; Korakakis 95' (pen.); Kostakis 105'

Kranoula Stadium, Kranoula
Referee: Gerasimos Ditsos (Preveza)

15 September 2010
15:45 EEST

Panegialios	1–1 (a.e.t.)	Trikala
Iordanidis 13'	Report	Telkiyski 11'
Penalties
Papoutsis (penalty missed); Staikos (penalty missed); Iordanidis (penalty missed)	0–3	(penalty scored) Telkiyski; (penalty scored) Brilakis; (penalty scored) Barrientos

Aigio Stadium, Aigio
Referee: Giannis Delfakis (Arcadia)

15 September 2010
15:45 EEST

Aias Salamina	0–0 (a.e.t.)	Pierikos
	Report
Penalties
Christou (penalty missed); Kochliotis (penalty missed); Delaportas (penalty missed)	0–3	(penalty scored) Pourtoulidis; (penalty scored) Papageorgiou; (penalty scored) Pavlidis

Perama Stadium, Perama
Referee: Spyros Selimos (Laconia)

15 September 2010
17:00 EEST

Panachaiki 2005	1–0	Levadiakos
Chrysafis 47' (pen.)	Report

Kostas Davourlis Stadium, Patras
Referee: Stefanos Mantakis (Imathia)

15 September 2010
18:00 EEST

Hersonissos	1–2	OFI
Tepetos 70' (pen.)	Report	Yakubu 43'; Agritis 49'

Pankritio Stadium, Heraklion
Referee: Giorgos Chatzis (West Attica)

15 September 2010
18:00 EEST

Agia Paraskevi	0–1	Ethnikos Asteras
	Report	Pavlis 50'

Agia Paraskevi Stadium, Agia Paraskevi
Referee: Angelos Evangelou (Athens)

15 September 2010
19:30 EEST

Rodos	0–1 (a.e.t.)	Diagoras
	Report	Zlatković 117'

Diagoras Stadium, Rhodes
Referee: Giorgos Segos (Euboea)

16 September 2010
15:00 EEST

Apollon Athens	1–3 (a.e.t.)	Panthrakikos
Kyrgias 51'	Report	Kazakis 83', 95'; Soultanidis 93'

Georgios Kamaras Stadium, Rizoupoli
Referee: Giorgos Tzovaras (Phthiotis)

16 September 2010
15:45 EEST

Odysseas Anagennisi	0–2	PAS Giannina
	Report	Skoufalis 60'; Buján 64'

Anagennisi Stadium, Anagennisi
Referee: Giorgos Liachoudis (Macedonia)

16 September 2010
15:45 EEST

PAO Rouf	2–1 (a.e.t.)	Agrotikos Asteras
Kafes 74', 111'	Report	Stefanidis 90+1'

Rouf Stadium, Rouf
Referee: Dimitris Nikas (Messinia)

16 September 2010
15:45 EEST

Tyrnavos 2005	0–0 (a.e.t.)	Doxa Drama
	Report
Penalties
Mangos (penalty scored); Grigoriou (penalty scored); Tsiatras (penalty scored); Georgantzias (penalty scored)	4–2	(penalty scored) González; (penalty missed) Markovski; (penalty missed) Santos; (penalty scored) Tsimblidis

Tyrnavos Stadium, Tyrnavos
Referee: Nikos Tevekelis (Macedonia)

== Additional round ==
The draw for this round took place on 18 August 2010.

=== Summary ===
Team 1	Score	Team 2
29 September 2010
Tyrnavos 2005	0–1	Veria
PAO Rouf	1–2 (a.e.t.)	Ethnikos Piraeus

=== Matches ===
29 September 2010
15:30 EEST

Tyrnavos 2005	0–1	Veria
	Report	Bargan 57'

Tyrnavos Stadium, Tyrnavos
Referee: Kostas Ioannidis (Argolis)

29 September 2010
15:30 EEST

PAO Rouf	1–2 (a.e.t.)	Ethnikos Piraeus
Kafes 90'	Report	Pereira 18'; Tsemperidis 114'

Rouf Stadium, Rouf
Referee: Ioannis Papadopoulos (Macedonia)

== Bracket ==
Round of 32
Anagennisi Giannitsa	1
Atromitos	3
Panachaiki 2005	0
Kavala	2
Ethnikos Asteras (p)	0(4)
Skoda Xanthi	0(2)
Diagoras	3
Panionios	1
Panetolikos	0
Iraklis	2
Veria	0
Kerkyra	1
OFI	0
Olympiacos Volos (a.e.t.)	1
Aetos Skydra	0
Panserraikos (a.e.t.)	2
Kozani	0
Panathinaikos	5
Trikala (p)	1(4)
Aris	1(2)
Ethnikos Piraeus	0
AEL	1
Panthrakikos	1
AEK Athens	5
Pierikos	1
Asteras Tripolis	3
Ilioupoli	0
Olympiacos	1
Eordaikos 2007	0
PAOK (a.e.t.)	1
PAS Giannina	1
Ergotelis	0

Round of 16
Atromitos	1
Kavala	0
Ethnikos Asteras	1	0	1
Diagoras	1	1	2
Iraklis	1	0	1(3)
Kerkyra (p)	1	0	1(5)
Olympiacos Volos	2
Panserraikos	0
Panathinaikos	3
Trikala	2
AEL	0
AEK Athens	4
Asteras Tripolis	0
Olympiacos	1
PAOK	2
PAS Giannina	1

Quarter-finals
Atromitos	2	1	3
Diagoras	0	0	0
Kerkyra	0	2	3
Olympiacos Volos	2	1	2
Panathinaikos	0	3	3
AEK Athens	2	2	4
Olympiacos	1	0	1
PAOK	1	1	2

Semi-finals
Atromitos	2	0	2
Olympiacos Volos	1	0	1
AEK Athens	0	1	1
PAOK	0	0	0

Final
Atromitos	0
AEK Athens	3

== Round of 32 ==
The draw for this round took place on 18 August 2010.

=== Summary ===
Team 1	Score	Team 2
Anagennisi Giannitsa	1–3	Atromitos
Eordaikos 2007	0–1 (a.e.t.)	PAOK
OFI	0–1 (a.e.t.)	Olympiacos Volos
PAS Giannina	1–0	Ergotelis
Panetolikos	0–2	Iraklis
Panachaiki 2005	0–2	Kavala
Panthrakikos	1–5	AEK Athens
Diagoras	3–1	Panionios
Ilioupoli	0–1	Olympiacos
Aetos Skydra	0–2 (a.e.t.)	Panserraikos
Kozani	0–5	Panathinaikos
Ethnikos Asteras	0–0 (4–2 p)	Skoda Xanthi
Trikala	1–1 (4–2 p)	Aris
Pierikos	1–3	Asteras Tripolis
Veria	0–1	Kerkyra
Ethnikos Piraeus	0–1	AEL

=== Matches ===
26 October 2010
14:00 EEST

Anagennisi Giannitsa	1–3	Atromitos
Ηasanoglu 57'	Report	Karalis 6', 53'; Saganowski 11'

Giannitsa Municipal Stadium, Giannitsa
Referee: Charalambos Kalogeropoulos (Athens)

28 October 2010
14:00 EEST

Eordaikos 2007	0–1 (a.e.t.)	PAOK
	Report	Fotakis 120'

Florina Stadium, Florina
Referee: Andreas Pappas (Athens)

26 October 2010
17:00 EEST

OFI	0–1 (a.e.t.)	Olympiacos Volos
	Report	Kapetanos 104' (pen.)

Theodoros Vardinogiannis Stadium, Heraklion
Referee: Vasilis Paboridis (Kilkis)

27 October 2010
15:00 EEST

PAS Giannina	1–0	Ergotelis
Bakayoko 45'	Report

Zosimades Stadium, Ioannina
Referee: Apostolos Amparkiolis (Macedonia)

27 October 2010
14:00 EEST

Panetolikos	0–2	Iraklis
	Report	Anastasiadis 52' (o.g.); Mara 90+2'

Panetolikos Stadium, Agrinio
Attendance: 2,814
Referee: Spyros Selimos (Laconia)

27 October 2010
14:00 EEST

Panachaiki 2005	0–2	Kavala
	Report	Darcheville 36'; Ogbeche 75'

Kostas Davourlis Stadium, Patras
Referee: Christos Mitsios (Epirus)

28 October 2010
16:00 EEST

Panthrakikos	1–5	AEK Athens
Simosis 18'	Report	Blanco 33', 42' (pen.), 69'; Karabelas 73'; Leonardo 85'

Komotini Stadium, Komotini
Attendance: 3,000
Referee: Athanasios Giachos (Chios)

27 October 2010
17:00 EEST

Diagoras	3–1	Panionios
Tarachulski 30'; Salamastrakis 83'; Reyes 90+5'	Report	Riera 10'

Diagoras Stadium, Rhodes
Referee: Ioannis Delfakis (Arcadia)

3 November 2010
17:00 EET

Ilioupoli	0–1	Olympiacos
	Report	Pantelić 87'

Stavros Mavrothalassitis Stadium, Egaleo
Referee: Dimitris Thanos (Grevena)

27 October 2010
14:00 EEST

Aetos Skydra	0–2 (a.e.t.)	Panserraikos
	Report	Tadić 108'; Chumbinho 114'

Skydra Stadium, Skydra
Referee: Dimitris Kyrkos (Epirus)

27 October 2010
17:00 EEST

Kozani	0–5	Panathinaikos
	Report	Cissé 6'; Govou 42'; Sarriegi 70'; Christodoulopoulos 73', 78' (pen.)

Municipal Athletic Center of Kozani, Kozani
Referee: Michalis Voskakis (Rethymno)

26 October 2010
17:00 EEST

Ethnikos Asteras	0–0 (a.e.t.)	Skoda Xanthi
	Report
Penalties
Franceschi (penalty scored); Kripintiris (penalty scored); Diamantis (penalty scored); Antoni (penalty scored)	4–2	(penalty missed) Quintana; (penalty missed) Buga; (penalty scored) Ellington; (penalty scored) Adefemi

Michalis Kritikopoulos, Kaisariani
Referee: Stavros Mantalos (Athens)

27 October 2010
20:00 EEST

Trikala	1–1 (a.e.t.)	Aris
Mingas 31'	Report	Guiaro 7'
Penalties
Mingas (penalty scored); Brilakis (penalty scored); Korbos (penalty scored); Barrientos (penalty scored)	4–2	(penalty scored) Koke; (penalty missed) Nafti; (penalty scored) Calvo; (penalty missed) Guiaro

Trikala Stadium, Trikala
Referee: Michalis Tsiniaris (Athens)

26 October 2010
15:00 EEST

Pierikos	1–3	Asteras Tripolis
Poulakos 23' (pen.)	Report	Carrera 13'; Francou 50'; Rogerio 78'

Municipal Athletic Center of Katerini I, Katerini
Referee: Alexandros Aretopoulos (Trikala)

28 October 2010
17:00 EEST

Veria	0–1	Kerkyra
	Report	Makris 8'

Veria Stadium, Veria
Referee: Aristomenis Koutsiaftis (Arta)

26 October 2010
20:00 EEST

Ethnikos Piraeus	0–1	AEL
	Report	Simić 62'

Elliniko Stadium, Ellinikon
Referee: Georgios Stathopoulos (Achaea)

== Round of 16 ==
The draw for this round took place on 1 November 2010.

=== Summary ===
Team 1	Score/Agg.	Team 2	Match	Replay
PAOK	2–1	PAS Giannina		
Olympiacos Volos	2–0	Panserraikos		
Iraklis	1–1 (3–5 p)	Kerkyra	1–1	0–0
Panathinaikos	3–2	Trikala		
Ethnikos Asteras	1–2	Diagoras	1–1	0–1
Atromitos	1–0	Kavala		
AEL	0–4	AEK Athens		
Asteras Tripolis	0–1	Olympiacos		

=== Matches ===
22 December 2010
15:30 EET

PAOK	2–1	PAS Giannina
Vanderson 3' (o.g.); Athanasiadis 42'	Report	Bakayoko 53'

Toumba Stadium, Thessaloniki
Attendance: 15,223
Referee: Michalis Voskakis (Rethymno)

21 December 2010
15:30 EET

Olympiacos Volos	2–0	Panserraikos
Solakis 54', 63'	Report

Panthessaliko Stadium, Volos
Referee: Athanasios Giachos (Chios)

23 December 2010
17:30 EET

Iraklis	1–1	Kerkyra
Iacob 87' (pen.)	Report	Tsigas 79'

Kaftanzoglio Stadium, Thessaloniki
Attendance: 1,224
Referee: Charalampos Kalogeropoulos (Athens)

22 December 2010
20:00 EET

Panathinaikos	3–2	Trikala
Ninis 44'; Leto 45'; Vyntra 68'	Report	Kontogoulidis 45+2'; Korbos 70'

Olympic Stadium, Marousi
Referee: Nathanail Charalampidis (Kavala)

23 December 2010
15:30 EET

Ethnikos Asteras	1–1	Diagoras
Traoré 74'	Report	Zouroudis 76'

Michalis Kritikopoulos Stadium, Kaisariani
Referee: Aristomenis Koutsiaftis (Arta)

21 December 2010
17:30 EET

Atromitos	1–0	Kavala
Perrone 51' (pen.)	Report

Peristeri Stadium, Peristeri
Attendance: 1,050
Referee: Michael Koukoulakis (Heraklion)

23 December 2010
20:00 EET

AEL	0–4	AEK Athens
	Report	Blanco 38'; Georgeas 53'; Djebbour 76'; Manolas 86'

AEL FC Arena, Larissa
Attendance: 10,000
Referee: Giorgos Stathopoulos (Achaea)

22 December 2010
17:30 EET

Asteras Tripolis	0–1	Olympiacos
	Report	Ibagaza 86'

Asteras Tripolis Stadium, Tripoli
Attendance: 5,138
Referee: Dimitris Kalopoulos (Macedonia)

==== Replay ====
12 January 2011
17:30 EET

Kerkyra	0–0 (a.e.t.)	Iraklis
	Report
Penalties
Stoltidis (penalty scored); Makris (penalty scored); Epstein (penalty scored); I. Ioannou (penalty scored); Kalantzis (penalty scored)	5–3	(penalty scored) Iacob; (penalty scored) Lima; (penalty missed) Soltani; (penalty scored) Josemi

Kerkyra Stadium, Corfu
Attendance: 1,040
Referee: Nathanail Charalampidis (Kavala)

12 January 2011
15:00 EET

Diagoras	1–0	Ethnikos Asteras
Tarachulski 30'	Report

Diagoras Stadium, Rhodes
Referee: Giorgos Kominis (Thesprotia)

== Quarter-finals ==
The draw for this round took place on 29 December 2010.

=== Summary ===
Team 1	Agg.	Team 2	1st leg	2nd leg
Atromitos	3–0	Diagoras	2–0	1–0
Kerkyra	2–3	Olympiacos Volos	0–2	2–1
Panathinaikos	3–4	AEK Athens	0–2	3–2
Olympiacos	1–2	PAOK	1–1	0–1

=== Matches ===
20 January 2011
19:00 EET

Atromitos	2–0	Diagoras
Perrone 41'; Camara 78'	Report

Peristeri Stadium, Peristeri
Attendance: 1,280
Referee: Praxitelis Zachariadis (Macedonia)
3 February 2011
16:00 EET

Diagoras	0–1	Atromitos
	Report	Saganowski 34'

Diagoras Stadium, Rhodes
Referee: Dimitris Kyrkos (Epirus)

Atromitos won 3–0 on aggregate.

18 January 2011
17:00 EET

Kerkyra	0–2	Olympiacos Volos
	Report	Monje 26' (pen.); Martín 80'

Kerkyra Stadium, Corfu
Attendance: 1,443
Referee: Dimitris Thanos (Grevena)
3 February 2011
17:00 EET

Olympiacos Volos	1–2	Kerkyra
Martín 28'	Report	Paraskevaidis 17'; I. Ioannou 74' (pen.)

Panthessaliko Stadium, Volos
Referee: Praxitelis Zachariadis (Macedonia)

Olympiacos Volos won 3–2 on aggregate.

19 January 2011
21:00 EET

Panathinaikos	0–2	AEK Athens
	Report	Liberopoulos 65', 80'

Olympic Stadium, Marousi
Attendance: 37,280
Referee: Dimitris Kalopoulos (Macedonia)
2 February 2011
21:00 EET

AEK Athens	2–3	Panathinaikos
Lagos 12'; Míchel 90+8'	Report	Cissé 21'; Gilberto Silva 45'; Vyntra 63'

Olympic Stadium, Marousi
Attendance: 12,411
Referee: Andreas Pappas (Athens)

AEK Athens won 4–3 on aggregate.

19 January 2011
18:00 EET

Olympiacos	1–1	PAOK
Modesto 45'	Report	Vieirinha 82'

Karaiskakis Stadium, Piraeus
Attendance: 28,404
Referee: Stavros Tritsonis (Athens)
2 February 2011
18:00 EET

PAOK	1–0	Olympiacos
Salpingidis 57'	Report

Toumba Stadium, Thessaloniki
Referee: Stavros Mantalos (Athens)

PAOK won 2–1 on aggregate.

== Semi-finals ==
The draw for this round took place on 29 December 2010, after the quarter-final draw.

=== Summary ===
Team 1	Agg.	Team 2	1st leg	2nd leg
AEK Athens	1–0	PAOK	0–0	1–0
Atromitos	2–1	Olympiacos Volos	2–1	0–0

=== Matches ===
2 March 2011
21:00 EET

AEK Athens	0–0	PAOK
	Report

Olympic Stadium, Marousi
Attendance: 16,928
Referee: Anastasios Sidiropoulos (Dodecanese)
16 March 2011
21:00 EET

PAOK	0–1	AEK Athens
	Report	Dellas 48'

Toumba Stadium, Thessaloniki
Attendance: 23,105
Referee: Stavros Mantalos (Athens)

AEK Athens won 1–0 aggregate.

2 March 2011
18:00 EET

Atromitos	2–1	Olympiacos Volos
Saganowski 10'; Nebegleras 62'	Report	Sankaré 79'

Peristeri Stadium, Peristeri
Referee: Petros Konstantineas (Messinia)
16 March 2011
18:00 EET

Olympiacos Volos	0–0	Atromitos
	Report

Panthessaliko Stadium, Volos
Referee: Anastasios Kakos (Corfu)

Atromitos won 2–1 on aggregate.

== Final ==
30 April 2011
20:30 EEST

Atromitos	0–3	AEK Athens
	Report	Liberopoulos 28'; Baha 78'; Kafes 85'

Olympic Stadium, Marousi
Attendance: 50,912
Referee: Anastasios Kakos (Corfu)

== Top scorers ==
Rank	Player	Club	Goals
1	(Greece) Dimitris Kafes	PAO Rouf	4
1	(Argentina) Ismael Blanco	AEK Athens	4
3	(Greece) Nikos Liberopoulos	AEK Athens	3
3	(Poland) Marek Saganowski	Atromitos	3
5	(Burkina Faso) Abdul Diallo	Ionikos	2
5	(Greece) Georgios Vakouftsis	PAO Rouf	2
5	(Greece) Vlasis Kazakis	Panthrakikos	2
5	(Greece) Recep Hasanoglu	Anagennisi Giannitsa	2
5	(Ivory Coast) Ibrahima Bakayoko	PAS Giannina	2
5	(Argentina) Emanuel Perrone	Atromitos	2
5	(Greece) Giannis Karalis	Atromitos	2
5	(Greece) Loukas Vyntra	Panathinaikos	2
5	(Greece) Konstantinos Samaropoulos	Aetos Skydra	2
5	(France) Djibril Cissé	Panathinaikos	2
5	(Greece) Lazaros Christodoulopoulos	Panathinaikos	2
5	(Greece) Ilias Solakis	Olympiacos Volos	2
5	(Argentina) Juan Eduardo Martín	Olympiacos Volos	2
5	(Poland) Bartosz Tarachulski	Diagoras	2
