= 2010–11 AEL Kalloni F.C. season =

AEL Kalloni
2010–11 season
- Chairman: (Greece) Taxiarchis Verros (until November 2010) (Greece) Nikos Michalakis (until May 2011)
- Manager: (Greece) Michalis Kasapis (until January 2011) (Greece) Sotiris Antoniou (until March 2011) (Greece) Prokopis Kartalis (until May 2011) (Brazil) Luciano de Souza (until May 2011)
- Stadium: Kostas Kenteris
- Football League 2 (North group) League 2, Gr 2 (2012): 2nd (promoted)
- Greek Cup: First Round

The 2010–11 season was AEL Kalloni first season in Football League 2.

== Greek Cup ==
Date	Opponents	H / A	Result F – A	Scorers
4 September 2010	Aetos Skydra	N	0 – 1	

== Football League 2 ==
Date	Opponents	H / A	Result F – A
12 September 2010	Zakynthos	H	2 – 1
19 September 2010	Niki Volos	A	1 – 0
25 September 2010	Tyrnavos 2005	H	0 – 0
6 October 2010	Odysseas Anagennisi	H	1 – 0
16 October 2010	Pontioi Katerini	A	0 – 0
23 October 2010	Aetos Skydra	H	1 – 1
31 October 2010	Fokikos	H	2 – 2
13 November 2010	Megas Alexandros Irakleia	A	3 – 1
21 November 2010	Doxa Kranoula	H	2 – 0
28 November 2010	Anagennisi Giannitsa	A	3 – 0
5 December 2010	Kozani	H	0 – 0
12 December 2010	Anagennisi Epanomi	A	0 – 1
19 December 2010	Eordaikos 2007	H	1 – 0
22 December 2010	Makedonikos	A	1 – 0
5 January 2011	Nafpaktiakos Asteras	A	0 – 1
12 January 2011	Ethnikos Filippiada	H	2 – 0

Date	Opponents	H / A	Result F – A
19 January 2011	Zakynthos	A	1 – 2
23 January 2011	Niki Volos	H	1 – 0
29 January 2011	Tyrnavos 2005	A	1 – 1
13 February 2011	Odysseas Anagennisi	A	1 – 1
20 February 2011	Pontioi Katerini	H	0 – 0
27 February 2011	Aetos Skydra	A	0 – 1
6 March 2011	Fokikos	A	0 – 0
12 March 2011	Megas Alexandros Irakleia	H	1 – 1
20 March 2011	Doxa Kranoula	A	1 – 2
26 March 2011	Anagennisi Giannitsa	H	2 – 1
30 March 2011	Kozani	A	4 – 3
6 April 2011	Anagennisi Epanomi	H	2 – 0
13 April 2011	Eordaikos 2007	A	1 – 1
27 April 2011	Makedonikos	H	3 – 1
8 May 2011	Nafpaktiakos Asteras	H	3 – 0
15 May 2011	Ethnikos Filippiada	A	0 – 1
