= 2010–11 Football League 2 (Greece) =

Football League 2
- Season: 2010–11
- Champions: Panachaiki (South); Anagennisi Epanomi (North)
- Promoted: Panachaiki; Vyzas; Iraklis Psachna; Platanias; Anagennisi Epanomi; AEL Kalloni; Fokikos; Anagennisi Giannitsa
- Relegated: Rodos; Korinthos; Panegialios; Aias Salaminas; Aspropyrgos; Olympiakos Hersonissos; Agia Paraskevi; Keravnos Keratea; Eordaikos; Ethnikos Filippiada; Nafpaktiakos Asteras; Kozani; Makedonikos

The 2010–11 Football League 2 was the 28th season since the official establishment of the third tier of Greek football in 1983. It started on September 12, 2010.

It's the first season with championship's new name, after its change from Gamma Ethniki to Football League 2.

== Southern Group ==
=== Teams ===
Location of teams in South Group of 2010–11 Football League 2

In the Southern Group participate teams from Attica, Peloponnese, West Greece, Crete, South Aegean and Ionian Islands. Teams which participate are: Agia Paraskevi, Aias Salaminas, Apollon Smyrnis, Aspropyrgos, Vyzas, Iraklis Psachna, Keravnos Keratea, Korinthos, Olympiakos Hersonissos, Panegialios, Panachaiki, Paniliakos, Platanias, Rodos, PAO Rouf, Chania.

=== League table ===
Pos	Team	Pld	W	D	L	GF	GA	GD	Pts	Promotion or relegation
1	Panachaiki (C, P)	30	17	10	3	48	20	+28	61	Promotion to Football League
2	Vyzas Megara (Note: Vyzas, Iraklis Psachna and Platanias promoted to the Football League due to Koriopolis scandal.) (P)	30	17	6	7	41	19	+22	57	Promotion to Football League
3	Iraklis Psachna (P)	30	17	5	8	41	24	+17	56	Promotion to Football League
4	Rodos (Note: Rodos due to financial difficulties decided to be voluntarily relegated to Delta Ethniki.) (R)	30	15	8	7	38	23	+15	53	Relegation to Delta Ethniki
5	Platanias (P)	30	15	7	8	42	23	+19	52	Promotion to Football League
6	Korinthos (Note: Panegialios, Aias Salaminas, Aspropyrgos, Korinthos and Olympiakos Chersonissos were automatically relegated, because they had committed forgery during the winter transfer window.) (R)	30	13	11	6	38	24	+14	50	Relegation to Delta Ethniki
7	Apollon Smyrnis	30	14	8	8	37	25	+12	50	
8	Panegialios (R)	30	12	7	11	29	32	−3	43	Relegation to Delta Ethniki
9	Chania	30	12	6	12	42	40	+2	42	
10	Aias Salaminas (R)	30	12	4	14	34	39	−5	40	Relegation to Delta Ethniki
11	PAO Rouf	30	10	7	13	34	32	+2	37	
12	Paniliakos	30	9	10	11	24	26	−2	37	
13	Aspropyrgos (R)	30	9	7	14	30	38	−8	34	Relegation to Delta Ethniki
14	Olympiakos Hersonissos (R)	30	6	8	16	21	32	−11	26	Relegation to Delta Ethniki
15	Agia Paraskevi (Note: Keravnos Keratea and Agia Paraskevi forfeited from the league.) (R)	30	3	7	20	13	62	−49	14 (Note: Agia Paraskevi was docked 2 points.)	Relegation to Delta Ethniki
16	Keravnos Keratea (R)	30	2	3	25	11	64	−53	6 (Note: Keravnos Keratea was docked 3 points.)	Relegation to Delta Ethniki

Source: Football League 2 standings (in Greek)
(C) Champions; (P) Promoted; (R) Relegated

=== Results ===
Home \ Away	AGP	AIA	APS	ASP	CHA	IPS	KER	KOR	OCH	PCK	PNG	PNL	ROF	PLA	ROD	VYZ
Agia Paraskevi		2–0	0–3	0–3	2–0	0–3	0–3	2–2	0–3	0–3	0–3	0–3	0–0	1–1	0–0	0–1
Aias Salamina	3–0		1–2	1–0	1–0	2–0	3–0	3–1	2–1	1–3	2–2	0–0	1–0	0–2	0–0	1–2
Apollon Smyrnis	3–0	2–0		0–0	2–0	3–0	3–0	1–1	2–1	2–1	0–2	1–1	1–0	0–3	1–1	0–1
Aspropyrgos	2–2	0–1	3–0		0–2	1–2	3–0	0–0	1–1	2–1	1–0	1–0	1–0	0–1	0–1	2–0
Chania	3–0	5–1	0–0	3–3		1–0	3–0	2–3	1–0	1–1	6–2	2–1	2–1	0–0	1–1	0–2
Iraklis Psachna	4–1	1–1	1–0	3–2	2–0		1–0	1–0	2–0	0–0	1–0	1–0	2–0	3–0	3–1	2–1
Keravnos Keratea	3–2	0–3	0–3	0–1	1–2	0–3		2–3	0–0	0–0	1–2	0–3	0–3	0–3	0–3	0–3
Korinthos	3–0	1–0	1–1	4–1	4–1	0–0	3–0		1–0	0–1	1–1	2–0	0–0	1–0	1–0	1–0
Olympiakos Hersonissos	0–1	0–1	0–2	2–0	2–1	0–2	3–0	1–1		1–2	0–1	0–1	2–0	1–0	1–1	0–0
Panachaiki	0–0	2–0	2–0	1–1	1–0	3–1	3–0	1–1	3–0		0–0	0–0	3–1	4–2	2–0	3–1
Panegialios	1–0	1–0	1–2	0–0	2–0	2–1	3–0	0–0	1–1	1–2		1–0	1–0	0–1	1–0	0–2
Paniliakos	0–0	1–0	1–1	2–0	1–2	0–0	1–0	0–0	0–0	0–0	2–0		2–2	2–0	2–1	1–3
PAO Rouf	3–0	3–1	0–2	3–1	4–2	1–1	1–0	1–0	1–1	1–3	2–0	4–0		1–1	0–2	0–1
Platanias	3–0	2–0	0–0	3–1	1–2	2–0	1–1	4–2	2–0	3–0	3–0	1–0	0–1		1–0	1–1
Rodos	3–0	5–3	2–0	3–0	0–0	2–1	1–0	1–0	1–0	0–2	1–1	2–0	1–0	2–1		2–1
Vyzas Megara	3–0	1–2	2–0	2–0	2–0	1–0	1–0	0–1	2–0	1–1	3–0	2–0	1–1	0–0	1–1	

Legend: Blue = home team win; Yellow = draw; Red = away team win.

== Northern Group ==
=== Teams ===
Location of teams in North Group of 2010–11 Football League 2

In the Northern Group participate teams from West Macedonia, Central Macedonia, East Macedonia and Thrace, Epirus, Central Greece and Thessaly. Because the number of teams in the Southern Group was bigger Zakynthos and AEL Kalloni will participate in the North Group and not in the South after both teams submitted a request. So the teams that participate in this group are: Aetos Skydra, Anagennisi Epanomi, Anagennisi Giannitsa, Doxa Kranoula, Eordaikos 2007, Ethnikos Filippiada, Fokikos, AEL Kalloni, Kozani, Makedonikos, Megas Alexandros Irakleia, Nafpaktiakos, Niki Volos, Odysseas Anagennisi, Pontioi Katerini, Tyrnavos, Zakynthos.

=== League table ===
Pos	Team	Pld	W	D	L	GF	GA	GD	Pts	Promotion or relegation
1	Anagennisi Epanomi (C, P)	32	15	13	4	44	26	+18	58	Promotion to Football League
2	AEL Kalloni (Note: AEL Kalloni, Fokikos and Anagennisi Giannitsa promoted to the Football League due to Koriopolis scandal.) (P)	32	15	11	6	40	22	+18	56	Promotion to Football League
3	Fokikos (P)	32	14	11	7	46	32	+14	53	Promotion to Football League
4	Anagennisi Giannitsa (P)	32	12	12	8	29	27	+2	48	Promotion to Football League
5	Pontioi Katerini	32	12	10	10	27	25	+2	46	
6	Eordaikos (Note: Eordaikos due to financial difficulties decided to be voluntarily relegated to local championship.) (R)	32	12	10	10	31	27	+4	46	Relegation to Delta Ethniki
7	Doxa Kranoula	32	11	12	9	26	23	+3	45	
8	Tyrnavos	32	11	12	9	29	25	+4	45	
9	Odysseas Anagennisi	32	11	11	10	32	36	−4	44	
10	Aetos Skydra	32	9	14	9	32	29	+3	41	
11	Niki Volos (Note: Niki Volos was docked 4 points.)	32	13	5	14	28	31	−3	40	
12	Megas Alexandros Irakleia	32	10	10	12	40	36	+4	40	
13	Zakynthos	32	10	9	13	24	27	−3	39	
14	Ethnikos Filippiada (R)	32	10	9	13	24	30	−6	39	Relegation to Delta Ethniki
15	Nafpaktiakos Asteras (R)	31	9	9	13	26	38	−12	36	Relegation to Delta Ethniki
16	Kozani (R)	32	8	10	14	38	51	−13	34	Relegation to Delta Ethniki
17	Makedonikos (Note: Makedonikos was docked 6 points.) (R)	32	3	6	23	16	47	−31	9	Relegation to Delta Ethniki

Source: Football League 2 standings (in Greek)
(C) Champions; (P) Promoted; (R) Relegated

=== Results ===
Home \ Away	AET	EPA	AGA	DOK	EOR	EFI	FOK	KAL	KOZ	MAK	MAI	NAF	NVL	ANS	PON	TYR	ZAK
Aetos Skydra		1–2	0–0	1–0	0–1	0–1	0–0	1–0	3–0	1–0	1–1	1–1	1–1	3–0	2–0	1–1	3–2
Anagennisi Epanomi	1–0		1–0	1–1	1–2	2–2	2–0	1–0	2–2	5–0	1–1	1–0	2–1	1–0	2–1	1–1	0–0
Anagennisi Giannitsa	3–1	1–1		1–0	1–2	2–0	1–4	0–3	3–3	1–0	1–0	3–0	1–0	1–1	1–0	1–0	0–0
Doxa Kranoula	0–0	1–3	1–1		1–0	1–1	0–0	2–1	3–0	0–0	2–1	0–2	1–0	3–0	1–0	2–1	0–2
Eordaikos	0–0	1–1	0–0	0–0		1–0	2–1	1–1	2–0	0–1	2–0	2–2	2–1	1–1	1–1	0–1	1–0
Ethnikos Filippiada	1–1	0–0	2–1	1–0	0–2		2–3	1–0	3–1	0–0	2–1	1–0	2–0	0–0	1–2	1–0	0–0
Fokikos	1–1	0–2	1–1	1–3	2–0	1–0		0–0	5–2	5–2	1–1	2–0	3–1	2–0	1–2	2–0	1–0
AEL Kalloni	1–1	2–0	2–1	2–0	1–0	2–0	2–2		0–0	3–1	1–1	3–0	1–0	1–0	0–0	0–0	2–1
Kozani	3–1	2–2	0–1	1–1	2–1	1–1	1–1	3–4		1–1	3–1	2–0	1–0	0–1	1–2	0–1	0–0
Makedonikos	0–2	0–2	0–0	0–0	0–1	0–1	0–1	0–1	0–1		1–1	1–2	0–1	3–1	0–1	1–2	2–0
Megas Alexandros Irakleia	1–0	2–2	3–0	0–0	2–1	3–0	3–1	1–3	0–1	3–0		4–2	0–1	0–1	2–0	2–0	1–0
Nafpaktiakos Asteras	1–1	2–1	1–1	0–1	0–2	0–0	0–0	1–0	2–1	1–0	0–0		0–1	1–2	0–0	0–0	2–1
Niki Volos	0–0	1–0	0–0	1–0	1–1	2–1	0–0	0–1	2–1	3–2	3–2	1–0		3–0	0–3	0–1	3–1
Odysseas Anagennisi	2–3	1–1	0–0	0–0	1–1	1–0	2–2	1–1	4–1	1–0	3–1	0–3	2–0		2–1	1–1	2–0
Pontioi Katerini	2–1	0–0	1–0	1–0	2–0	1–0	1–0	0–0	2–2	0–0	0–0	0–1	0–1	1–2		2–1	1–3
Tyrnavos	1–1	1–2	0–1	0–0	2–1	1–0	0–1	1–1	2–1	3–0	1–1	4–1	1–0	1–0	0–0		1–1
Zakynthos	2–0	0–1	0–1	0–0	1–0	1–0	1–2	2–1	0–1	1–0	2–1	2–1	1–0	0–0	0–0	0–0	

Legend: Blue = home team win; Yellow = draw; Red = away team win.
