= 1999–2000 Gamma Ethniki =

Gamma Ethniki
- Season: 1999–2000
- Champions: Akratitos
- Promoted: Akratitos; Nafpaktiakos Asteras
- Relegated: Thesprotos; Agersani Naxos; Niki Volos; Neapolis Thessaloniki; Poseidon Michaniona; Ethnikos Katerini; Keratsini; Karditsa; Edessaikos; Doxa Vyronas

The 1999–2000 Gamma Ethniki was the 17th season since the official establishment of the third tier of Greek football in 1983. Akratitos was crowned champion, thus winning promotion to Beta Ethniki. Nafpaktiakos Asteras also won promotion as a runner-up of the league.

Thesprotos, Agersani Naxos, Niki Volos, Neapolis Thessaloniki, Poseidon Michaniona, Ethnikos Katerini, Keratsini, Karditsa, Edessaikos and Doxa Vyronas were relegated to Delta Ethniki.

== League table ==
Location of teams in 1999–2000 Gamma Ethniki

Pos	Team	Pld	W	D	L	GF	GA	GD	Pts	Promotion or relegation
1	Akratitos (C, P)	38	25	9	4	79	29	+50	84	Promotion to Beta Ethniki
2	Nafpaktiakos Asteras (P)	38	22	9	7	64	34	+30	75	Promotion to Beta Ethniki
3	Kozani	38	19	9	10	49	31	+18	66	
4	Marko	38	18	9	11	55	33	+22	63	
5	Atromitos	38	18	6	14	55	39	+16	60	
6	Chalkidona-Near East	38	16	10	12	57	32	+25	58	
7	Apollon Krya Vrysi	38	16	10	12	60	47	+13	58	
8	Leonidio (O)	38	16	9	13	60	48	+12	57	Qualification for relegation play-off
9	Kilkisiakos (O)	38	17	5	16	53	49	+4	56	Qualification for relegation play-off
10	ILTEX Lykoi (O)	38	13	15	10	55	50	+5	54	Qualification for relegation play-off
11	Thesprotos (R)	38	14	12	12	45	45	0	54	Qualification for relegation play-off
12	Agersani Naxos (R)	38	15	9	14	42	45	−3	54	Qualification for relegation play-off
13	Niki Volos (R)	38	13	13	12	44	47	−3	52	Qualification for relegation play-off
14	Neapolis Thessaloniki (R)	38	15	7	16	57	57	0	52	Relegation to Delta Ethniki
15	Poseidon Michaniona (R)	38	11	15	12	40	40	0	48	Relegation to Delta Ethniki
16	Ethnikos Katerini (R)	38	13	6	19	56	68	−12	45	Relegation to Delta Ethniki
17	Keratsini (R)	38	8	9	21	32	64	−32	33	Relegation to Delta Ethniki
18	Karditsa (R)	38	9	3	26	28	65	−37	30	Relegation to Delta Ethniki
19	Edessaikos (R)	38	8	4	26	28	97	−69	28	Relegation to Delta Ethniki
20	Doxa Vyronas (R)	38	4	11	23	30	69	−39	23	Relegation to Delta Ethniki

(C) Champions; (O) Play-off winners; (P) Promoted; (R) Relegated

== Results ==
Home \ Away	AGR	AKR	AKV	ATR	CHA	DXV	EDE	ETK	LYK	KRD	KRT	KIL	KOZ	LEO	MAR	NAP	NEA	NVL	PNM	THE
Agersani Naxos		1–0	2–0	0–3	2–1	2–0	4–2	2–1	1–1	1–0	0–0	1–0	0–0	2–1	0–0	1–0	1–2	1–0	4–2	2–0
Akratitos	1–0		2–2	2–1	1–0	8–1	4–1	4–1	3–2	5–0	1–0	4–2	2–0	3–0	2–0	1–0	4–0	4–0	1–0	1–0
Apollon Krya Vrysi	2–1	1–1		1–1	1–0	4–1	4–0	3–1	3–0	2–2	3–1	2–1	1–0	2–1	2–1	1–3	3–2	2–3	0–0	3–0
Atromitos	1–1	0–1	2–0		1–3	1–0	5–0	2–1	4–1	2–1	1–1	1–0	2–0	1–0	2–0	0–2	4–0	2–0	0–3	3–1
Chalkidona-Near East	2–0	1–2	1–0	1–2		2–0	3–0	3–1	3–0	2–1	6–0	4–1	3–2	3–0	1–1	3–1	2–4	1–1	1–0	0–0
Doxa Vyronas	1–1	0–0	1–1	0–2	0–5		1–1	3–4	2–2	0–2	0–0	1–0	1–1	1–0	3–2	0–1	1–2	0–1	0–0	0–1
Edessaikos	1–2	0–1	1–3	2–2	2–0	1–0		1–3	1–5	1–0	2–0	1–0	1–0	1–1	1–4	0–5	1–0	1–1	3–2	0–1
Ethnikos Katerini	2–1	3–3	0–3	1–0	1–0	1–0	2–0		0–0	1–0	3–1	2–1	1–0	0–0	2–4	1–2	1–2	4–1	0–1	1–4
ILTEX Lykoi	4–1	1–1	2–1	2–0	0–0	1–1	2–0	2–2		2–0	2–1	2–2	1–2	1–1	2–0	1–0	2–1	0–0	0–1	2–1
Karditsa	1–0	1–2	1–3	1–0	1–0	3–1	3–2	2–3	1–3		1–0	1–2	0–0	1–2	0–0	0–2	1–0	1–0	0–2	1–2
Keratsini	1–4	2–3	4–0	1–0	0–0	1–1	1–0	1–0	2–2	2–1		1–3	0–1	2–6	2–0	1–2	0–3	3–0	1–0	0–0
Kilkisiakos	1–0	0–0	1–3	3–2	0–2	2–0	6–1	2–1	2–2	3–0	2–0		4–1	2–1	1–0	2–1	3–0	2–0	2–0	4–1
Kozani	3–1	1–0	0–0	2–1	2–1	2–0	2–0	2–1	2–0	1–0	3–0	3–0		1–0	1–1	0–0	1–0	3–0	0–0	4–0
Leonidio	3–1	1–0	2–0	0–2	1–0	2–0	8–1	4–2	1–2	2–0	1–1	2–0	1–0		0–0	2–2	2–1	4–4	5–1	2–1
Marko	4–0	2–1	2–1	1–0	2–1	2–0	5–0	3–1	0–1	4–0	1–0	2–0	2–0	4–2		0–0	0–0	1–0	1–0	2–0
Nafpaktiakos Asteras	2–2	3–3	2–1	1–0	0–0	3–0	3–0	3–2	2–1	3–0	2–0	2–0	2–3	2–1	1–0		1–0	1–2	2–0	2–0
Neapolis Thessaloniki	0–1	2–2	1–0	5–3	1–1	1–6	4–0	3–2	3–1	3–0	1–0	1–3	1–2	1–2	1–1	3–1		1–0	1–2	2–0
Niki Volos	1–0	0–2	1–1	0–0	2–0	1–0	3–0	1–0	1–1	2–0	1–1	3–0	1–1	0–0	3–2	2–1	2–1		1–1	4–4
Poseidon Michaniona	0–0	0–3	1–1	1–1	0–0	3–1	2–1	3–1	1–1	2–1	4–0	0–1	0–0	0–0	1–1	1–2	1–1	3–2		0–0
Thesprotos	2–0	1–1	2–1	0–1	1–0	3–3	4–0	1–1	1–0	3–0	3–0	0–0	2–1	1–0	1–0	1–1	1–1	4–4	1–1	

Legend: Blue = home team win; Yellow = draw; Red = away team win.

== Relegation play-offs ==
Team 1	Agg.	Team 2	1st leg	2nd leg	3rd leg
ILTEX Lykoi	5–2	Thesprotos	2–2	2–0	1–0
Kilkisiakos	4–4	Agersani Naxos	2–1	1–2	1–1
Leonidio	6–2	Niki Volos	2–0	1–2	3–0

== Top scorers ==
Rank	Player	Club	Goals
1	(Greece) Dimitrios Moustakas	Akratitos	26
2	(Greece) Kapriotis	Neapolis Thessaloniki	20
3	(Greece) Nikolaos Soultanidis	Kilkisiakos	18
4	(Greece) Pantelis Kolliakos	Akratitos	17
4	(Albania) Ermal Tahiri	Marko	17
6	(Greece) Fotis Mitsakis	Apollon Krya Vrysi	16
