= 2011–12 Football League 2 (Greece) =

Football League 2
- Season: 2011–12
- Champions: Apollon Smyrnis (South); Ethnikos Gazoros (North)
- Promoted: Apollon Smyrnis; Ethnikos Gazoros; Niki Volos
- Relegated: Ilisiakos; Rouf; Megas Alexandros Irakleia; Anagennisi Serres; Aetos Skydra

The 2011–12 Football League 2 was the 29th season since the official establishment of the third tier of Greek football in 1983. It is scheduled to start on 27 November 2011. 23 teams are separated into two groups, 11 in Group 1 (South) and 12 in Group 2 (North) according to geographical criteria.

== Southern Group ==
=== Teams ===
Location of teams in South Group of 2011–12 Football League 2

Team	Location	Last season
Apollon Smyrnis	Athens	7th
Asteras Magoula	Magoula	D Group 7, 1st
Chania	Chania	9th
Glyfada	Athens	D Group 8, 1st
Ilisiakos	Athens	D Group 8, 9th
Kalamata	Kalamata	D Group 6, 1st
Paniliakos	Pyrgos	12th
Proodeftiki	Athens	D Group 9, 1st
Rouf	Athens	11th
Rouvas	Gergeri	D Group 10, 1st
Zakynthos	Zakynthos	FL2 North, 13th

=== Standings ===
Pos	Team	Pld	W	D	L	GF	GA	GD	Pts	Promotion or relegation
1	Apollon Smyrnis (C, P)	20	12	4	4	28	12	+16	40	Promotion to Football League
2	Paniliakos	20	10	5	5	24	16	+8	35	Qualification for Promotion play-off
3	Zakynthos	20	9	2	9	20	25	−5	29	Qualification for Promotion play-off
4	Glyfada	20	7	8	5	24	19	+5	29	
5	Kalamata	20	6	10	4	13	15	−2	28	
6	Rouvas	20	7	4	9	18	22	−4	25	
7	Chania	20	6	6	8	18	20	−2	24	
8	Asteras Magoula	20	5	8	7	19	22	−3	23	
9	Proodeftiki	20	5	7	8	16	20	−4	22	Qualification for Relegation play-off
10	Ilisiakos (R)	20	5	6	9	17	22	−5	21	Relegation to Delta Ethniki
11	Rouf (R)	20	3	10	7	22	26	−4	19	Relegation to Delta Ethniki

Source: Football League 2 standings (in Greek)
Rules for classification: 1) points; 2) goal difference; 3) number of goals scored.
(C) Champions; (P) Promoted; (R) Relegated

=== Results ===
Home \ Away	APS	MGL	CHA	GLY	ILI	KLM	PNL	PRO	ROF	ROU	ZAK
Apollon Smyrnis		3–0	2–0	3–1	2–0	1–2	0–1	2–3	3–0	2–1	1–0
Asteras Magoula	0–1		2–2	0–1	1–1	1–1	0–0	2–0	1–1	2–3	3–1
Chania	0–1	2–0		1–1	3–1	0–0	2–1	1–0	3–1	0–1	4–0
Glyfada	0–0	0–0	2–0		3–0	3–1	2–1	4–2	1–1	1–3	1–2
Ilisiakos	0–0	0–2	3–0	1–1		0–1	1–0	3–2	1–1	0–0	0–0
Kalamata	0–0	0–0	0–0	0–0	1–0		0–0	0–0	1–1	1–0	1–0
Paniliakos	3–1	3–1	1–0	0–0	1–0	4–1		1–1	1–1	2–0	2–1
Proodeftiki	0–1	0–0	0–0	0–2	1–0	1–1	1–0		2–0	2–0	0–1
Rouf	1–1	0–1	3–0	0–0	1–3	2–0	3–0	1–1		1–2	1–2
Rouvas	0–3	0–1	0–0	2–0	0–2	2–0	1–2	0–0	1–1		2–1
Zakynthos	0–1	3–2	1–0	2–1	2–1	0–2	0–1	1–0	2–2	1–0	

Source: Football League 2 matchdays (in Greek)
Legend: Blue = home team win; Yellow = draw; Red = away team win.

== Northern Group ==
=== Teams ===
Location of teams in North Group of 2011–12 Football League 2

Team	Location	Last season
Aetos Skydra	Skydra	10th
Anagennisi Serres	Serres	9th
Apollon Kalamarias	Thessaloniki	D Group 2, 1st
Doxa Kranoula	Kranoula	7th
Ethnikos Gazoros	Gazoros	D Group 1, 1st
Megas Alexandros Irakleia	Irakleia	12th
Niki Volos	Volos	11th
Oikonomos	Tsaritsani	D Group 4, 1st
Iraklis	Thessaloniki-Katerini	5th
Tilikratis	Lefkada	D Group 5, 1st
Tyrnavos 2005	Tyrnavos	8th
Vataniakos	Katerini	D Group 3, 1st

=== Standings ===
Pos	Team	Pld	W	D	L	GF	GA	GD	Pts	Promotion or relegation
1	Ethnikos Gazoros (C, P)	22	13	4	5	37	17	+20	43	Promotion to Football League
2	Niki Volos (P)	22	11	7	4	31	11	+20	40	Qualification for Promotion play-off
3	Oikonomos	22	11	6	5	27	16	+11	39	Qualification for Promotion play-off
4	Apollon Kalamarias	22	10	8	4	25	15	+10	38	
5	Iraklis	22	9	9	4	31	14	+17	36	Promotion to Football League (Note: AEP-Iraklis were promoted as Iraklis Thessaloniki to Football League because of a decision from EPO that decided to run a Football League with 21 teams, 4 of which would be promoted to the first division.)
6	Tilikratis	22	10	5	7	22	15	+7	35	
7	Tyrnavos	22	9	8	5	22	17	+5	35	
8	Vataniakos	22	6	6	10	16	26	−10	24	
9	Doxa Kranoula	22	5	7	10	17	25	−8	22	
10	Megas Alexandros Irakleia (R)	22	5	5	12	20	43	−23	20 (Note: Megas Alexandros and Anagennisi Serres will play a tie-break match. The loser of this match will be relegated, while the winner will qualify for the relegation play-off against Proodeftiki.)	Qualification for Relegation play-off
11	Anagennisi Serres (R)	22	4	8	10	15	30	−15	20	Relegation to Delta Ethniki
12	Aetos Skydra (Note: Aetos Skydra are deducted 11 points for fixing their 2010–11 season matches against Doxa Kranoula and Pontioi Katerini.) (R)	22	2	1	19	14	48	−34	−4	Relegation to Delta Ethniki

Source: Football League 2 standings (in Greek)
Rules for classification: 1) points; 2) goal difference; 3) number of goals scored.
(C) Champions; (P) Promoted; (R) Relegated

=== Results ===
Home \ Away	AET	ANS	APO	DOK	GAZ	MAI	NVL	OIK	IRA	TIL	TYR	VAT
Aetos Skydra		2–3	0–1	1–0	1–2	1–2	0–1	0–2	0–2	0–1	1–3	0–1
Anagennisi Serres	1–0		0–0	0–0	1–1	0–0	1–2	0–0	0–1	2–0	1–1	2–1
Apollon Kalamarias	1–1	2–0		4–0	2–1	1–0	1–0	1–1	0–0	1–2	2–2	1–0
Doxa Kranoula	3–1	1–1	0–1		2–3	4–2	0–2	1–0	0–0	1–0	0–0	1–1
Ethnikos Gazoros	4–0	2–1	0–1	2–0		3–0	1–0	1–1	1–3	3–0	3–0	3–1
Megas Alexandros Irakleia	4–5	1–1	0–3	1–2	0–3		2–3	3–1	1–0	1–1	2–1	0–0
Niki Volos	3–0	3–0	2–0	0–0	1–0	7–0		2–1	1–1	1–1	0–0	2–0
Oikonomos	3–0	1–0	1–0	3–2	0–1	4–1	0–0		0–0	1–0	2–1	1–0
Iraklis	6–0	4–0	2–2	1–0	1–1	2–0	2–1	1–1		0–2	0–1	3–0
Tilikratis	2–0	1–0	2–0	2–0	0–0	1–0	0–0	0–2	1–1		0–1	5–0
Tyrnavos	2–1	3–1	1–1	0–0	1–0	0–0	1–0	0–1	1–0	0–1		3–1
Vataniakos	1–0	4–0	0–0	1–0	1–2	0–1	0–0	2–1	1–1	1–0	0–0	

Source: Football League 2 matchdays (in Greek)
Legend: Blue = home team win; Yellow = draw; Red = away team win.

== Playoffs ==
=== Tie-break match ===
20 June 2012
18:30 EEST

Megas Alexandros Irakleia	4 – 1	Anagennisi Serres
Salmas 14'; Diamantis 72', 90+1'; Veletanis 89'		9' Basioukas

Serres Municipal Stadium
Serres

=== Relegation play-off ===
24 June 2012
18:30 EEST

Proodeftiki	1 – 0	Megas Alexandros Irakleia
Kalaitzidis 83'

Trikala Municipal Stadium
Trikala

=== Promotion play-offs ===
The promotion play-offs will comprise the teams ranked 2nd and 3rd from both groups during the regular season, and they are scheduled to take place immediately after the conclusion of the regular season.

Pos	Team	Pld	W	D	L	GF	GA	GD	Pts	Promotion
1	Niki Volos (O, P)	6	3	2	1	12	6	+6	13	Promotion to Football League
2	Oikonomos	6	3	3	0	7	3	+4	12	
3	Zakynthos	6	1	2	3	8	9	−1	5	
4	Paniliakos	6	0	3	3	7	16	−9	5	

Source: soccerway
Rules for classification: 1) points; 2) goal difference; 3) number of goals scored.
(O) Play-off winners; (P) Promoted
