= Georgios Matzourakis =

Greek footballer

Personal information
- Full name: Georgios Matzourakis
- Date of birth: 29 December 1983 (age 42)
- Place of birth: Athens, Greece
- Height: 1.80 m (5 ft 11 in)
- Position: Right-back

Senior career*
Years	Team	Apps	(Gls)
2005–2006	Odysseas Anagennisi		
2006–2008	Chaidari	34	(0)
2008–2009	Pierikos	13	(0)
2009–2010	Egaleo	7	(0)
2010–	Megas Alexandros Irakleia	22	(0)
- * Club domestic league appearances and goals as of 1 July 2011

Georgios Matzourakis (Greek: Γεώργιος Ματζουράκης; born 29 December 1983) is a Greek former professional footballer who played as a right-back.

== Career ==
Born in Athens, Matzourakis began playing football for Odysseas Anagennisi F.C. in the Delta Ethniki. He later played in the Beta Ethniki for Pierikos, Chaidari F.C. and Egaleo F.C.
