= 2002–03 Beta Ethniki =

Beta Ethniki
- Season: 2002–03
- Dates: 24 August 2002 – 25 May 2003
- Champions: Chalkidona
- Promoted: Chalkidona; Paniliakos
- Relegated: Olympiacos Volos; Kavala; Panegialios; Athinaikos

Beta Ethniki 2002–03 complete season.

== League table ==
Location of teams in 2002–03 Beta Ethniki

Pos	Team	Pld	W	D	L	GF	GA	GD	Pts	Promotion or relegation
1	Chalkidona (C, P)	30	19	8	3	61	20	+41	65	Promotion to Alpha Ethniki
2	Paniliakos (P)	30	18	6	6	43	25	+18	60	Promotion to Alpha Ethniki
3	Apollon Kalamarias	30	17	8	5	38	19	+19	59	Qualification for Promotion play-off
4	Fostiras	30	11	12	7	34	27	+7	45	
5	Ethnikos Asteras	30	12	9	9	36	32	+4	45	
6	Kerkyra	30	12	8	10	31	23	+8	44	
7	Kalamata	30	9	13	8	29	22	+7	40	
8	Apollon Smyrnis	30	10	9	11	40	43	−3	39	
9	Atromitos	30	9	10	11	30	33	−3	37	
10	Panserraikos	30	10	6	14	33	41	−8	36	
11	Patraikos	30	9	9	12	28	32	−4	36	
12	Kassandra	30	8	9	13	27	36	−9	33	
13	Olympiacos Volos (Note: Ethnikos Olympiacos Volos withdraw from the competition after the season due to financial problems.) (R)	30	9	4	17	25	43	−18	31	Withdraw
14	Kavala (R)	30	4	4	22	21	58	−37	16	Qualification for Relegation play-off
15	Panegialios (Note: Panegialios and Athinaikos were deducted 3 points per match for having debts to former players.) (R)	30	9	7	14	31	42	−11	−56	Relegation to Delta Ethniki
16	Athinaikos (R)	30	8	10	12	30	41	−11	−56	Relegation to Delta Ethniki

(C) Champions; (P) Promoted; (R) Relegated

== Results ==
Home \ Away	APL	APS	ATH	ATR	CHA	ETA	FOS	KAL	KSN	KAV	KER	EOV	PNG	PNL	PSE	PTR
Apollon Kalamarias		1–0	0–0	1–0	2–1	1–0	0–0	0–3	2–0	2–0	1–0	4–0	1–0	2–1	4–2	1–0
Apollon Smyrnis	2–1		2–3	5–4	1–1	3–1	0–1	3–2	2–0	2–1	0–0	2–1	2–3	0–1	2–1	0–0
Athinaikos	0–1	1–0		1–0	0–4	0–3	1–1	0–0	1–1	1–1	0–0	4–1	1–1	1–0	2–4	5–2
Atromitos	1–0	1–1	1–1		0–4	1–1	0–1	1–1	3–0	1–0	0–0	0–1	0–0	0–0	1–0	1–1
Chalkidona	1–1	2–2	2–2	3–2		0–1	3–0	2–0	1–0	4–0	1–0	3–1	4–1	1–1	2–0	4–0
Ethnikos Asteras	0–1	1–2	3–6	2–2	0–0		1–1	1–0	4–1	1–0	1–0	3–0	3–2	0–0	1–1	1–2
Fostiras	3–1	2–0	2–1	0–0	0–2	1–2		1–1	2–2	3–1	2–2	3–1	3–0	1–1	0–0	0–0
Kalamata	0–0	3–0	0–0	0–0	0–1	2–0	1–0		1–1	2–0	0–0	2–0	2–1	4–1	0–0	1–0
Kassandra	4–2	2–0	3–0	0–2	1–1	0–0	0–1	2–0		1–0	1–2	1–0	2–0	0–2	0–2	1–1
Kavala	1–1	0–1	1–2	0–1	1–4	1–0	0–4	3–2	1–1		0–3	1–3	0–2	1–2	0–1	3–2
Kerkyra	3–1	1–0	0–0	0–0	1–1	0–1	0–0	0–0	1–0	1–3		2–1	5–2	2–0	4–2	2–0
Olympiacos Volos	2–0	0–0	1–0	1–0	0–2	2–3	1–0	1–1	0–0	2–1	1–2		0–0	0–1	1–0	1–2
Panegialios	1–1	0–0	0–1	1–3	1–3	1–0	1–1	1–1	2–0	3–0	3–0	2–0		0–2	1–0	1–0
Paniliakos	4–3	3–3	1–0	1–0	1–0	1–0	3–0	2–0	1–1	2–0	1–0	1–2	2–1		2–0	1–0
Panserraikos	2–3	2–1	2–1	1–1	1–3	0–1	0–1	1–0	0–2	1–1	1–0	1–0	3–0	2–5		0–0
Patraikos	0–0	2–0	1–2	0–2	0–1	1–1	2–0	0–0	2–0	3–0	0–0	2–1	2–0	1–0	2–3	

Legend: Blue = home team win; Yellow = draw; Red = away team win.

== Promotion play-off ==
1 June 2003

Ionikos	2–1	Apollon Kalamarias
Rodrigues 47', 78'	Report	Hartwig 77'

Volos Municipal Stadium, Volos
Attendance: 3,000
Referee: Giorgos Kasnaferis (Athens)

Ionikos retained their spot in 2003–04 Alpha Ethniki. Apollon Kalamarias placed on 2003–04 Beta Ethniki

== Relegation play-off ==
8 June 2003

Kavala	1–2 (a.e.t.)	Levadiakos
Tsangaris 76' (o.g.)	Report	Tsangaris 21'; Pastos 97' (pen.)

Alcazar Stadium, Larissa
Referee: Giannis Spyropoulos (Phthiotis)

Levadiakos were promoted to 2003–04 Beta Ethniki. Kavala were relegated to 2003–04 Gamma Ethniki.

== Top scorers ==
Rank	Player	Club	Goals
1	(Greece) Giorgos Zacharopoulos	Chalkidona N.E.	21
2	(Greece) Ioannis Thomaidis	Paniliakos	15
2	(Greece) Thomas Troupkos	Apollon Kalamarias	15
4	(Serbia and Montenegro) Dušan Jovanović	Panserraikos	11
5	(Peru) César Rosales	Fostiras	10
5	(Greece) Andreas Androutsos	Patraikos	10
8	(Bulgaria) Georgi Georgiev	Apollon Smyrnis	9
8	(Greece) Pantelis Kolliakos	Ethnikos Asteras	9
10	(Greece) Alexandros Gavrilopoulos	Atromitos	9
10	(Greece) Fanouris Goundoulakis	Kalamata	9
