= Kyriakos Kivrakidis =

Greek football player

Personal information
- Date of birth: 21 July 1992 (age 34)
- Place of birth: Stuttgart, Germany
- Height: 1.70 m (5 ft 7 in)
- Position: Right-back

Team information
- Current team: Niki Volos
- Number: 19

Youth career
- Ethnikos Vaterou

Senior career*
Years	Team	Apps	(Gls)
2011–2012	Pontioi Katerini	17	(1)
2012–2013	Iraklis	1	(0)
2013–2014	Aiginiakos	19	(5)
2014–2024	Atromitos	188	(3)
2024–2025	Iraklis	18	(0)
2025–	Niki Volos	22	(0)
- * Club domestic league appearances and goals as of April 2, 2026

Kyriakos Kivrakidis (Greek: Κυριάκος Κιβρακίδης; born 21 July 1992) is a Greek professional footballer who plays as a right-back for Super League 2 club Niki Volos.

== Career ==
On January transfer window of 2014, he joined Atromitos from Gamma Ethniki club Aiginiakos. On 3 March 2014, he made his debut for the first team in a home game against Panionios. On 21 August 2017, he scored his first goal in the Super League with the club in a 1–1 home draw against Apollon Smyrnis. On 1 October 2017, he scored with a header helping his club to win 1–0 champions Olympiacos at Karaiskakis Stadium. It was his second goal with the club in the Super League. On 8 April 2019, Kivrakidis scored the game's only goal as Atromitos defeated Super League basement club Apollon Smyrnis 1–0 to move three points clear of Aris in fourth spot.

== Career statistics ==
As of 2 April 2026

Club	Season	League			Cup		Continental		Other		Total	
Club	Season	Division	Apps	Goals	Apps	Goals	Apps	Goals	Apps	Goals	Apps	Goals
Pontioi Katerini	2011–12	Gamma Ethniki	17	1	2	0	—		—		19	1
Iraklis	2012–13	Football League	1	0	0	0	—		—		1	0
Aiginiakos	2012–13	Gamma Ethniki	7	1	0	0	—		—		7	1
Aiginiakos	2013–14	Football League	12	4	4	0	—		—		16	4
Aiginiakos	Total		19	5	4	0	—		—		23	5
Atromitos	2013–14	Superleague Greece	2	0	0	0	—		—		2	0
Atromitos	2014–15	Superleague Greece	25	0	2	0	0	0	—		27	0
Atromitos	2015–16	Superleague Greece	21	0	8	0	4	0	—		33	0
Atromitos	2016–17	Superleague Greece	22	0	4	0	—		—		26	0
Atromitos	2017–18	Superleague Greece	27	2	5	0	—		—		32	2
Atromitos	2018–19	Superleague Greece	17	1	2	0	1	0	—		20	1
Atromitos	2019–20	Superleague Greece	15	0	4	0	2	0	—		21	0
Atromitos	2020–21	Superleague Greece	22	0	1	0	—		—		23	0
Atromitos	2021–22	Superleague Greece	21	0	1	0	—		—		22	0
Atromitos	2022–23	Superleague Greece	3	0	1	0	—		—		4	0
Atromitos	2023–24	Superleague Greece	13	0	3	0	—		—		16	0
Atromitos	Total		188	3	31	0	7	0	—		226	3
Iraklis	2024–25	Superleague Greece 2	16	0	2	0	—		—		18	0
Niki Volos	2025–26	Superleague Greece 2	22	0	0	0	—		—		22	0
Career total			263	9	39	0	7	0	0	0	309	9
