= Ethnikos =

Ethnikos means National in Greek and may refer to the following:

In football,

- Ethnikos Achna FC, a football team from Achna, Cyprus
- Ethnikos Assia, a lower-league football team from Assia, Cyprus
- Ethnikos Asteras, a football team from Athens, Greece
- Ethnikos Filippiada F.C., a football team from Filippiada, Greece
- Ethnikos Katerini, a lower-league football team from Katerini, Greece
- Ethnikos Patron, a lower-league football team from Patras, Greece
- Ethnikos Piraeus, a football team from Piraeus, Greece
