= Anderson Lima =

Anderson Lima may refer to:

- Ânderson Lima (footballer, born 1973), Brazilian football right wing-back
- Anderson Lima (footballer, born 1979), Brazilian football defensive midfielder
