= Matzourakis =

Matzourakis (Greek: Ματζουράκης) is a Greek surname. Notable people with the surname include:

- Giannis Mantzourakis (born 1949), Greek footballer and manager
- Giorgos Matzourakis (born 1983), Greek footballer
