= Konstantinos Rougalas =

Greek footballer

Kostas Rougalas
Personal information
- Full name: Konstantinos Rougalas
- Date of birth: 13 October 1993 (age 33)
- Place of birth: Patras, Greece
- Height: 1.92 m (6 ft 3 1/2 in)
- Position: Centre-back

Team information
- Current team: Foinikas Polichni

Youth career
- 2007–2013: Olympiacos

Senior career*
Years	Team	Apps	(Gls)
2013–2015	Olympiacos	0	(0)
2013	→ Ergotelis (loan)	0	(0)
2013–2014	→ Fostiras (loan)	21	(1)
2014	→ Atlético Madrid B (loan)	2	(0)
2015	Iraklis	6	(0)
2015–2016	OH Leuven	17	(0)
2017	Târgu Mureș	10	(0)
2017–2018	Westerlo	16	(0)
2018–2019	Doxa Drama	19	(0)
2019–2020	Panachaiki	7	(0)
2020	Dunărea Călărași	1	(0)
2020–2022	Diagoras	52	(0)
2022–2023	Panachaiki	16	(0)
2023	Apollon Pontus	4	(0)
2024	Tilikratis	9	(1)
2024–2025	Apollon Krya Vrysi		
2025	Naoussa		
2025–	Foinikas Polichni		

International career^{‡}
2009–2010	Greece U17	10	(1)
2010–2012	Greece U19	19	(3)
- * Club domestic league appearances and goals as of 16 June 2023 ‡ National team caps and goals as of 12 July 2015

Konstantinos "Kostas" Rougalas (Greek: Κωνσταντίνος "Κώστας" Ρουγκάλας; born 13 October 1993) is a Greek professional footballer who is currently playing as a centre-back for Gamma Ethniki club Foinikas Polichni.

== Career ==
Born in Patras, Rougalas first played football for Thyella Patras F.C. He joined Olympiacos' youth setup in 2007, aged 14. In September 2013, he moved to Ergotelis in a season-long loan deal.

After making no appearances for Ergotelis, Rougalas moved to Fostiras on 25 January of the following year, also in a temporary deal. He made his professional debut six days later, starting in a 3–0 home win against Asteras Magoula.

Rougalas scored his first professional goal on 16 March 2014, netting the first of a 2–0 away win against Paniliakos. He appeared in 21 matches during the campaign, as his side missed out promotion in the play-offs.

On 13 August 2014 Rougalas moved abroad for the first time in his career, joining Atlético Madrid in a one-year loan deal. He was assigned to the reserves in Segunda División B.

On 9 February 2015, Rougalas penned a two-and-a-half-year deal with Football League side Iraklis. On 1 July 2015 he was released by Iraklis and one day later he was signed by Oud-Heverlee Leuven, where he was reunited with his former Fostiras' coach Jacky Mathijssen. On the summer of 2016, he released his contract in a mutual content with Oud-Heverlee Leuven.

On 20 January 2017, he signed a six months' contract with the Romanian club Târgu Mureș for an undisclosed fee. On 28 June 2017, after six months in Romania, he signed a two years' contract with Belgian First Division B club Westerlo for an undisclosed fee. On 31 August 2018, he signed a contract with Football League club Doxa Drama for an undisclosed fee and the next season for another Football League club Panachaiki. In 2020 he joined the Hellenic football club Diagoras.
