= 1964–65 Beta Ethniki =

Beta Ethniki
- Season: 1964–65
- Dates: 18 October 1964 – 20 June 1965
- Champions: Egaleo (Group 1); Vyzas Megara (Group 2); Panserraikos (Group 3); Edessaikos (Group 4)
- Promoted: Egaleo; Panserraikos
- Relegated: Anagennisi Arta; PAO Samfrapoli; Patraikos OF; Rodiakos; AEK Kalamata; Phoebus Kremasti; AO Tripolis; AE Nikaia; Aris Piraeus; Ergotelis; Aiolikos; Pannafpliakos; Rethymniakos; Aris Chios; Talos Chania; Doxa Piraeus; Pagkorinthiakos; Chalkidona; Foinikas Polichni; Thermaikos Thessaloniki; Iraklis Kavala; Megas Alexandros Irakleia; Aris Drama; Atromitos Serres; AE Kavala; Elpida Nigrita; PO Xirokrinis; Kadmos Thiva; Naoussa; Levadiakos; Apollon Larissa

Beta Ethniki 1964–65 complete season.

== Group 1 ==
=== League table ===
Pos	Team	Pld	W	D	L	GF	GA	GD	Pts	Qualification or relegation
1	Egaleo (C, P)	30	19	7	4	55	20	+35	75	Qualification for Promotion play-off
2	Fostiras	30	16	10	4	63	32	+31	72	
3	Panetolikos	30	18	6	6	49	23	+26	72	
4	Panachaiki	30	16	5	9	48	33	+15	67	
5	Thyella Patras	30	15	7	8	52	31	+21	65 (Note: Thyella Patras and Rodiakos had 2 points deducted.)	
6	PAO Kalogreza	30	14	7	9	60	49	+11	65	
7	Diagoras	30	14	7	9	47	38	+9	65	
8	Atromitos	30	13	7	10	53	39	+14	63	
9	Averof Ioannina	30	12	9	9	53	42	+11	63	
10	Anagennisi Arta (R)	30	13	6	11	40	41	−1	62	Relegation to C National Amateur Division
11	PAO Samfrapoli (R)	30	10	8	12	50	43	+7	58	Relegation to C National Amateur Division
12	Patraikos OF (R)	30	10	7	13	47	50	−3	57	Relegation to C National Amateur Division
13	Rodiakos (R)	30	7	7	16	34	58	−24	49	Relegation to C National Amateur Division
14	AEK Kalamata (R)	30	7	3	20	30	60	−30	46 (Note: AEK Kalamata had 1 point deducted.)	Relegation to C National Amateur Division
15	Phoebus Kremasti (R)	30	4	5	21	29	69	−40	43	Relegation to C National Amateur Division
16	AO Tripolis (R)	32	1	3	28	17	99	−82	30 (Note: AO Tripolis had 7 points deducted.)	Relegation to C National Amateur Division

(C) Champions; (P) Promoted; (R) Relegated

== Group 2 ==
=== League table ===
Pos	Team	Pld	W	D	L	GF	GA	GD	Pts	Qualification or relegation
1	Vyzas Megara (C)	32	21	9	2	77	21	+56	83	Qualification for Promotion play-off
2	Korinthos	32	21	4	7	59	25	+34	78	
3	Panelefsiniakos	32	17	10	5	54	21	+33	76	
4	Atromitos Piraeus	32	17	10	5	51	29	+22	76	
5	OFI	32	17	7	8	63	31	+32	71 (Note: OFI and Pagkorinthiakos had 2 points deducted.)	
6	Argonaftis Piraeus	32	13	10	9	51	45	+6	68	
7	AE Nikaia (R)	32	13	10	9	54	33	+21	68	Relegation to C National Amateur Division
8	Aris Piraeus (R)	32	13	9	10	47	42	+5	67	Relegation to C National Amateur Division
9	Ergotelis (R)	32	13	8	11	60	37	+23	66	Relegation to C National Amateur Division
10	Aiolikos (R)	32	13	7	12	40	39	+1	65	Relegation to C National Amateur Division
11	Pannafpliakos (R)	32	11	9	12	46	41	+5	63	Relegation to C National Amateur Division
12	Rethymniakos (R)	32	11	8	13	45	50	−5	62	Relegation to C National Amateur Division
13	Aris Chios (R)	32	10	5	17	45	63	−18	57	Relegation to C National Amateur Division
14	Talos Chania (R)	32	7	6	19	32	67	−35	51 (Note: Talos Chania and Chalkidona had 1 point deducted.)	Relegation to C National Amateur Division
15	Doxa Piraeus (R)	32	6	5	21	29	69	−40	49	Relegation to C National Amateur Division
16	Pagkorinthiakos (R)	32	5	3	24	28	95	−67	43	Relegation to C National Amateur Division
17	Chalkidona (R)	32	4	0	28	19	92	−73	39	Relegation to C National Amateur Division

(C) Champions; (R) Relegated

== Group 3 ==
=== League table ===
Pos	Team	Pld	W	D	L	GF	GA	GD	Pts	Qualification or relegation
1	Panserraikos (C, P)	30	21	6	3	79	25	+54	77 (Note: ?1 point deducted?)	Qualification for Promotion play-off
2	MENT Toumba	30	15	6	9	53	33	+20	66	
3	Foinikas Polichni (R)	30	12	11	7	61	44	+17	65	Relegation to C National Amateur Division
4	Thermaikos Thessaloniki (R)	30	14	7	9	46	33	+13	65	Relegation to C National Amateur Division
5	Aspida Xanthi	30	12	10	8	49	43	+6	64	
6	Makedonikos	30	13	7	10	54	38	+16	63	
7	Kilkisiakos	30	12	9	9	40	34	+6	63	
8	Filippoi Kavala	30	12	9	9	43	27	+16	62 (Note: Filippoi Kavala, Aris Drama, Elpida Nigrita and PO Xirokrinis had 1 point deducted.)	
9	Elpida Drama	30	11	9	10	38	30	+8	61	
10	Iraklis Kavala (R)	30	9	12	9	42	29	+13	59 (Note: ?1 point deducted?)	Relegation to C National Amateur Division
11	Megas Alexandros Irakleia (R)	30	10	11	9	29	39	−10	57 (Note: Megas Alexandros Irakleia had 4 points deducted.)	Relegation to C National Amateur Division
12	Aris Drama (R)	30	11	6	13	29	41	−12	57	Relegation to C National Amateur Division
13	Atromitos Serres (R)	30	10	7	13	48	61	−13	57	Relegation to C National Amateur Division
14	AE Kavala (R)	30	9	3	18	28	62	−34	50	Relegation to C National Amateur Division
15	Elpida Nigrita (R)	30	4	5	21	29	96	−67	42	Relegation to C National Amateur Division
16	PO Xirokrinis (R)	30	4	4	22	31	76	−45	41	Relegation to C National Amateur Division

(C) Champions; (P) Promoted; (R) Relegated

== Group 4 ==
=== League table ===
Pos	Team	Pld	W	D	L	GF	GA	GD	Pts	Qualification or relegation
1	Edessaikos (C)	30	19	6	5	53	27	+26	73 (Note: ?1 point deducted?)	Qualification for Promotion play-off
2	Anagennisi Giannitsa	30	13	10	7	49	42	+7	66	
3	Lamia	30	14	7	9	54	34	+20	65	
4	Olympiacos Volos	30	12	10	8	39	32	+7	64	
5	AEL	30	15	4	11	34	30	+4	64	
6	Veria	30	14	5	11	49	26	+23	63	
7	Olympiakos Chalkida	30	11	10	9	51	31	+20	62	
8	Aris Ptolemaida	30	13	6	11	36	32	+4	62	
9	Anagennisi Karditsa	30	11	8	11	44	38	+6	60	
10	Aris Kastoria	30	11	8	11	40	35	+5	60	
11	Evripos Chalkida	30	13	4	13	45	41	+4	60	
12	Nikiforos Florina	30	11	8	11	40	42	−2	60	
13	Kadmos Thiva (R)	30	12	6	12	43	41	+2	60	Relegation to C National Amateur Division
14	Naoussa (R)	30	5	14	11	32	46	−14	53 (Note: ?1 point deducted?)	Relegation to C National Amateur Division
15	Levadiakos (R)	30	5	11	14	33	51	−18	51	Relegation to C National Amateur Division
16	Apollon Larissa (R)	30	0	3	27	13	101	−88	32 (Note: ?1 point deducted?)	Relegation to C National Amateur Division

(C) Champions; (R) Relegated

== Promotion play-off ==
Pos	Team	Pld	W	D	L	GF	GA	GD	Pts	Promotion
1	Panserraikos (P)	6	3	1	2	7	5	+2	13	Promotion to Alpha Ethniki
2	Egaleo (P)	6	3	1	2	9	7	+2	13	Promotion to Alpha Ethniki
3	Edessaikos	6	3	0	3	6	9	−3	12	
4	Vyzas Megara	6	2	0	4	8	9	−1	10	

(P) Promoted

Home \ Away	PSE	EGA	EDE	VYZ
Panserraikos		2–1	1–0	3–0
Egaleo	1–1		2–1	1–0
Edessaikos	1–0	2–1		2–0
Vyzas Megara	2–0	1–3	5–0	

Legend: Blue = home team win; Yellow = draw; Red = away team win.
