= 2010–11 Football League 2 =

2010–11 Football League 2 may refer to:

- 2010–11 Football League 2 (Greece)
- 2010–11 Football League Two, England
