= 2011–12 Football League 2 =

2011–12 Football League 2 may refer to:

- 2011–12 Football League 2 (Greece)
- 2011–12 Football League Two, England
