= Foinikas Polichni F.C. =

Association football club in Greece

Foinikas Polichni
- Full name: Athlitikos Podosfairikos Omilos Foinikas Polichni
- Founded: 29 January 1955; 71 years ago
- Ground: Polichni Municipal Stadium
- Capacity: 3,000
- Chairman: Georgia Anastasiou
- Manager: Georgios Akritopoulos
- League: Gamma Ethniki
- 2025–26: Macedonia FCA First Division, 1st (promoted)
Home colours	Away colours

Foinikas Polichni Football Club (Greek: Αθλητικός Ποδοσφαιρικός Όμιλος Φοίνικας Πολίχνης) is a Greek football club based in Polichni, Thessaloniki.

== History ==
Foinikas Polichni was founded on 29 January 1955 by ambitious local residents of Polichni under the original name Ellinikos Foinikas Polichni.

During the 1956–57 and 1957–58 seasons, the club competed in the probationary division under the name Ellinikos Foinix, in the 1958–59 season in the Third Division under the name Ellinikos Foinix, in the 1959–60 season in the B1 Division, and in the 1960–61 season in the Beta (B') Division of Macedonia Football Clubs Association. On 29 March 1961, the club was renamed to APO Foinikas Polichni, and under this name, it earned promotion as runners-up to the First Division during the 1961–62 season. In a very short period of time, the Polichni team starred and impressed with its continuous upward trajectory, and in the 1964–65 season, it played in the Beta Ethniki for the first time, where it finished third.

From 1969 to 1975, Foinikas wrote a golden chapter in its history, becoming known nationwide through its successes against major clubs. Following a three-match tie against Pyrsos Grevena—where they lost 1–0, won 2–1, and then won 2–1 after extra time on neutral ground in Veria on 12 July 1970—the club earned promotion to Beta Ethniki, where it competed for five consecutive seasons. The goals for Foinikas in the decisive match against Pyrsos were scored by Pavlos Konstantinidis and Savvas Avramidis during extra time.

The club played in the Beta Ethniki during the 1964–65 season and from 1970 to 1975. In the third-tier national division, it competed in 1965–66 and 1966–67. In the National Amateur Division (third tier), it played from 1978 to 1982.

During the 1987–88 season, a match between Odysseas Kordelio and Foinikas Polichni at the Makedonikos Stadium set an attendance record for the league with 4,380 tickets sold. The two clubs, both finishing top of their respective groups in the Macedonia FCA First Division, earned promotion to Delta Ethniki following a single-round play-off between the top three teams, in which Proodeftiki finished third and missed out on promotion. Foinikas Polichni subsequently competed in Delta Ethniki from 1988 until 1993, as well as during the 1994–95 season.

The years that followed proved to be less glorious, as the club competed between the first and second divisions of the Macedonia FCA, remaining absent from the national divisions. Nevertheless, the club managed to win two Macedonia FCA Cups during this period, in the 2001–02 and 2005–06 seasons, defeating ILTEX Lykoi 2–1 and Ionikos Ionia 1–0 respectively.

In the 2025–26 season, Foinikas managed to win the Macedonia FCA championship after 32 years, securing its return to the Gamma Ethniki. In the same season, the club also reached the Macedonia FCA Cup final but missed out on the double, losing 5–4 on penalties to Doxa Assiros following a 0–0 draw in regular time.

== Crest and colours ==
The club's crest depicts the mythical phoenix, the bird that rises from its ashes as a symbol of perpetual renewal, strength, and hope. The phoenix was not chosen at random; it embodies the resilience against adversity, rebirth, and continuity that have characterized the club for seven decades. The club's colours are red and white.

== Honours ==
=== Regional titles ===
- Macedonia FCA First Division: 7
  - 1963–64, 1969–70, 1977–78, 1985–86, 1987–88, 1993–94, 2025–26
- Macedonia FCA Cup: 3
  - 1980–81, 2001–02, 2005–06
- Macedonia FCA Super Cup: 1
  - 2026
