= Vasilios Baxevanos =

Greek footballer (born 1993)

Personal information
- Full name: Vasilios Baxevanos
- Date of birth: 23 October 1993 (age 33)
- Place of birth: Aalen, Germany
- Height: 1.81 m (5 ft 11 in)
- Position: Defensive midfielder

Team information
- Current team: Chalkanoras Idaliou
- Number: 93

Youth career
- PAOK

Senior career*
Years	Team	Apps	(Gls)
2011–2013	Anagennisi Giannitsa	38	(1)
2013	Panachaiki	1	(0)
2013–2014	Anagennisi Giannitsa	23	(0)
2014–2015	Paniliakos	7	(0)
2015	Pierikos	14	(1)
2015–2016	Tyrnavos	13	(1)
2016–2017	PAEEK	11	(1)
2017	APE Langada		
2017–2018	Panarkadikos	19	(2)
2018–2019	Diagoras	21	(1)
2019–2020	Egaleo	10	(1)
2020	Aspropyrgos	8	(0)
2020–2021	Almopos Aridea	0	(0)
2021	Rodos	16	(1)
2021–2022	Trikala	24	(0)
2022–2023	Alki Oroklini	10	(0)
2023–2024	GS Ilioupolis	18	(0)
2024	PAEEK	27	(1)
2025–	Chalkanoras Idaliou	14	(0)
- * Club domestic league appearances and goals as of 26 June 2025

Vasilios Baxevanos (Greek: Βασίλειος Μπαξεβάνος; born 23 October 1993) is a Greek professional footballer who plays as a defensive midfielder for Cypriot club Chalkanoras Idaliou.
