= Anastasios Pastos =

Greek footballer

Personal information
- Full name: Anastasios Spyridon Pastos
- Date of birth: 15 August 1978 (age 48)
- Place of birth: Athens, Greece
- Height: 1.88 m (6 ft 2 in)
- Position: Defender

Senior career*
Years	Team	Apps	(Gls)
1997–1999	PAOK		
1999	Ialysos		
1999–2000	Apollon Athens		
2000–2001	Doxa Katokopias		
2001–2009	Levadiakos		
2009-2010	Pierikos		
2010–2011	Ethnikos Piraeus		
2011–2012	Chalkis		
- * Club domestic league appearances and goals

Anastasios Pastos (Greek: Αναστάσιος Παστός; born 15 August 1978) is a retired Greek football defender.
