= Abdul Diallo =

Burkinabe footballer (born 1985)

Personal information
- Date of birth: 23 December 1985 (age 40)
- Place of birth: Ouagadougou, Burkina Faso
- Height: 1.89 m (6 ft 2 in)
- Position: Forward

Youth career
- 2005–2006: Panthrakikos U21

Senior career*
Years	Team	Apps	(Gls)
2006–2010	Panthrakikos	84	(17)
2010–2011	→ Paphos FC (loan)	7	(0)
2011	→ Ionikos (loan)	13	(2)
2011–2012	Kallithea	8	(1)
2012–2013	Vyzas	12	(4)
2013	Apollon Smyrni	8	(0)
- * Club domestic league appearances and goals

Abdul Diallo (born 23 December 1985) is a Burkinabe former professional footballer who played as a forward.

== Career ==
Diallo was born in Ouagadougou, Burkina Faso. His career began in Europe in 2005 at the age of 20 when he signed a professional contract with Panthrakikos He was a member of Panthrakikos U21 in the 2005–06 season with a remarkable performance. In the 2006 he was promoted to the first squad. In the following four years he participated in Beta Ethniki, Super League Greece and Cypriot First Division.
