= Juan Martín (footballer) =

Argentine footballer

Personal information
- Full name: Juan Eduardo Martín
- Date of birth: 27 April 1982 (age 44)
- Place of birth: Leones, Argentina
- Height: 1.83 m (6 ft 0 in)
- Position: Forward

Senior career*
Years	Team	Apps	(Gls)
1999–2001	Almirante Brown		
2001–2002	Luján de Cuyo		
2002–2003	Almirante Brown		
2003–2004	Defensores de Cambaceres		
2004	Defensa y Justicia		
2005–2006	Luján de Cuyo		
2006–2008	Estudiantes		
2008–2009	Los Andes	35	(11)
2009–2010	Defensa y Justicia	35	(16)
2010–2011	Olympiacos Volos	34	(10)
2011–2012	Kerkyra	13	(1)
2012–2013	Belgrano	4	(0)
2013–2014	Instituto Cordoba	37	(14)
2014	Estudiantes de Buenos Aires	21	(10)
2015–2016	Douglas Haig	57	(20)
2016–2018	Barracas Central	66	(36)
2018–2019	Tristán Suárez	24	(5)
2020–2021	Ciudad de Bolívar		
2021	Juventud Unida (G)	13	(0)
2022–2023	Luján		
- * Club domestic league appearances and goals

Juan Eduardo Martín (born 27 April 1982) is an Argentinian former professional exfootball who played as a Forward.

== Career ==
In 2015, he joined Douglas Haig. After stints at Barracas Central, Tristán Suárez, Ciudad Bolívar, and Juv. Unida (G), he signed with Club Luján in 2022.

He was the top scorer in the Primera B Metropolitana during the 2007-08 and 2016–17 seasons.
