= Anderson Lima (footballer, born 1979) =

Brazilian footballer

Anderson de Lima Freitas
Personal information
- Date of birth: 12 November 1979 (age 46)
- Place of birth: Rio Grande do Norte, Brazil
- Height: 1.81 m (5 ft 11 in)
- Position: Defensive midfielder

Senior career*
| Years | Team | Apps | (Gls) |
| 2002–2003 | Atromitos | 22 | (4) |
| 2003–2005 | Chalkidona | 34 | (5) |
| 2005–2006 | Panathinaikos | 1 | (0) |
| 2006–2007 | Atromitos | 16 | (1) |
- * Club domestic league appearances and goals as of 3 June 2013 ‡ National team caps and goals as of 3 June 2013

Anderson de Lima Freitas (born November 12, 1979), known as just Anderson Lima or just Anderson, is a Brazilian former professional footballer.

== Football career ==
He started his career at the local football club, America de Natal. He had stayed here for three years, before signed with Vila Nova Futebol Clube, at the age of twenty. From there, he was located by the scouters of Apollon Athens and brought him to Athens for trials. In the summer of 2002, he was transferred to Atromitos F.C., in the Greek Beta Ethniki.

After 22 appearances and 4 goals during this season, Anderson Lima moved to Chalkidona F.C., which was playing in Alpha Ethniki. His first season as a member of Chalkidona (2003–04, he took part in 21 matches, scoring 3 goals. Also, the first half of the next period (2005–06), he played 13 matches and scored 2 goals, wearing Chalkidona's kit.

On January 7, 2005, he became a player of Panathinaikos F.C. He make his debut wearing the greens in a match against AEK Athens In this match, he injured seriously in his right leg, and he stopped playing football for a month.

He returned to Atromitos on August 16, 2006. During his second passing as a player of Atromitos, he made 16 appearances and scored 1 goal. He also played against Sevilla at the UEFA Cup. His last year in Atromitos, was his last year as a professional footballer. However, he played a few matches for AO Dikaiou, an amateur football club based in Kos, in 2009.

After his playing career, he became a players' spokesman.
