= Ethnikos Katerini F.C. =

Ethnikos Katerini
- Full name: Ethnikos Katerini Football Club
- Founded: 1973; 53 years ago
- Ground: Kalianidis Stadium; Katerini
- Capacity: 1,000
- Chairman: Anastasios Tsaousidis
- Manager: Sakis Panteliadis
- League: Pieria FCA First Division
- 2025–26: Pieria FCA First Division, 7th
Home colours	Away colours

Ethnikos Katerini Football Club is a football club based in Katerini, Greece. It was founded in 1973. The club won the Greek Amateur Cup in 1996. It has played three times in Gamma Ethniki (third national division), the seasons 1999-00, 2007-08 and 2008-09.

== Honours ==
=== Domestic ===
League

- Delta Ethniki
  - Winners (2): 1998–99, 2005–06
- Pieria FCA First Division
  - Winners (3): 1980–81, 1991–92, 2002–03

Cup

- Greek Football Amateur Cup
  - Winners (1): 1995–96
- Pieria FCA Cup
  - Winners (9): 1980–81, 1982–83, 1985–86, 1988–89, 1989–90, 1992–93, 1994–95, 1995–96, 1996–97
