= Chalkidona F.C. =

Greek football club

Chalkidona
- Full name: 1930–1940s PAO Chalkidona; 1940s–2005 Chalkidona-Near East; 2005–2010; Chalkidona-Proteas; 2010–present A.O. Chalkidona
- Founded: 1930; 96 years ago
- Ground: Pantelis Nikolaidis Ground, Nikaia, Piraeus
- Capacity: 1,000
- Chairman: Panagiotis Chatziapostolou
- Manager: Eleftherios Vasileiadis
- League: Piraeus FCA First Division
- 2025–26: Piraeus FCA First Division (1st group), 2nd
Home colours	Away colours

Chalkidona Football Club (Greek: Aθλητικός Όμιλος Χαλκηδών) is a Greek football club based in Chalkidona neighbourhood in Nikaia, Attica. The official founding year of the club is 1930, and its official colors are yellow and blue.

== History ==
=== Early years ===
During the pre-war period, Chalkidona operated as an unofficial football club in Chalkidona, Nikaia, and did not participate in the Piraeus FCA championships. According to later reports, the team was founded in 1924 (or 1925) by Konstantinos Melidis, who remained its president for 22 years.

The references in reports regarding its founding in 1924 or 1925 likely refer to the year it was established as an unofficial football club. The year 1930, noted in later reports and on the club's emblem, likely refers to the year it was officially recognized under the name "Podosfairikos Athlitikos Omilos Chalkidon" by the Court of First Instance of Piraeus.

In March 1947, the club was re-established under the name "Podosfairikos kai Athlitikos Omilos Nikaias i Chalkidon", on the initiative of its original founder, Konstantinos Melidis, who was initially elected president. However, the club joined the Piraeus FCA in 1947, as noted in another 1948 publication: "One of the strongest official clubs of Nikaia is Chalkidon of the Third Category, which although founded in 1925 remained unofficial until 1947."

Starting from the 1947–1948 season, it participated in the 1947–1948 Third Category championship of the Piraeus FCA. In the following 1948–1949 season, it starred in the 1948–1949 Third Category of the Piraeus FCA, and the team's performances attracted the interest of the press, which featured a front-page article with a photograph of the starting eleven wearing the double-headed eagle on their chest.

=== A.E. Chalkidon Near East (1957–1967) ===
During the 1956–1957 season, P.A.O. Chalkidon competed in the Second Category of the Piraeus FCA. In 1957, it absorbed Near East Nikaia. Starting from the 1957–1958 season, the club competed under the name "Athlitiki Enosi Chalkidon Near East". In the 1959–1960 season, it earned promotion for the first time to the First Category of the Piraeus FCA for the 1960–1961 season.

In the 1960–1961 season, after finishing third in the First Category of the Piraeus FCA, the club competed in the unofficial Beta Ethniki of 1960–1961. In the 1963–1964 season, as runner-up of the First Category of the Piraeus FCA, it earned promotion to Beta Ethniki for the 1964–1965 season. In the following years, it continued to compete in the Piraeus FCA championships.

=== A.O. Chalkidon Near East (1967–2005) ===
In 1967, the Regime of the Colonels mandated that all Athletic Unions be renamed to Athletic Clubs, and consequently the club was renamed to "Athlitikos Omilos Chalkidon Near East".

In the mid-1990s, businessman Giorgos Spanos took over the football club, leading it through a remarkably rapid ascent up the divisions through careful management and strategic decisions. He managed to transform what was a small local amateur team into a model professional football club. The club achieved promotion to a higher category every two years, ultimately reaching the top-tier Alpha Ethniki. In its debut season in the top tier (2003–04 Alpha Ethniki), the club was far from a pushover, competing until the final matchday for 6th place and a spot in the 2004–05 UEFA Cup, which it ultimately missed by just 2 points behind Panionios. During the 2004–05 season, the club enjoyed another solid campaign, finishing in 8th place in Alpha Ethniki. However, despite its athletic progress and attractive style of play, the football club failed to draw substantial fan interest, often playing in front of three-figure crowds. The apathy of the majority of Nikaia's football public led its president, Giorgos Spanos, to seek out a club with a larger fan base. In the summer of 2005, he relocated Chalkidon Near East P.A.E. to Peristeri and merged it with Atromitos Athens, which had just been relegated to Gamma Ethniki. Consequently, starting from the 2005–2006 season, Atromitos took the place of A.O. Chalkidon Near East in the 2005–06 Alpha Ethniki, achieving qualification for the 2006–07 UEFA Cup with the team's squad and manager Georgios Paraschos.

=== A.E. Chalkidon–Proteas (2005–2007) ===
Although Chalkidon Near East P.A.E. was dissolved, businessman Giorgos Spanos ensured that the football club would not disappear. He merged the founding sports club "A.O. Chalkidon Near East" with the athletic club "P.A.O. Proteas Nikaia", which was renamed to "Athlitiki Enosi Chalkidon–Proteas" and joined the First Category of the Piraeus FCA for the 2005–2006 season.

In the 2006–2007 season, A.E. Chalkidon–Proteas won Group 1 of the Piraeus FCA First Category and earned promotion to Delta Ethniki for the 2007–2008 season. However, it did not compete in the division, as it was absorbed by Doxa Vyronas, to which it yielded its place.

=== A.O. Chalkidon (2010–present) ===
In 2009, on the initiative of former players and supporters of the club, an agreement was reached with officials of Neapolikos Asteras Nikaia to rename the team to "Athlitikos Omilos Chalkidon". The renaming was finalized in 2010, coinciding with the team earning promotion to the Second Category of the Piraeus FCA for the 2009–2010 season.

During the 2012–2013 season, the club won the Piraeus FCA Third Category championship. In the following 2013–2014 season, after finishing third in the Second Category and navigating the play-offs successfully, A.O. Chalkidon secured promotion to the First Category of the Piraeus FCA for the 2014–2015 season.

== Honours ==
=== Domestic ===
- Beta Ethniki
  - Winners (1): 2002–03
- Delta Ethniki
  - Winners (1): 1998–99
- Greek Football Amateur Cup
  - Winners (1): 1998–99
- Piraeus FCA First Division
  - Winners (2): 1996–97, 2006–07
- Piraeus FCA Cup
  - Winners (2): 1997–98, 1998–99

== Notable players ==
- (Greece) Thanasis Intzoglou
- (Greece) Nikos Nioplias
- (Greece) Dimosthenis Manousakis
- (Greece) Christos Mikes
- (Greece) Stergos Marinos
- (Greece) Petros Xanthopoulos
- (Brazil) Anderson Lima
- (Brazil) Formiga
- (Cameroon) Pierre Ebéde
