= Aetos Skydra F.C. =

Aetos Skydra
- Full name: Aetos Skydra Football Club
- Founded: 1952; 74 years ago
- Dissolved: 2013; 13 years ago
- Ground: Skydra Municipal Ground
- Capacity: 600
- League: League 2, Gr 2 (2012)
Home colours	Away colours

Aetos F.C. (Greek: Α.Σ. Αετός Σκύδρας) was a Greek football club, based in Skydra, Greece.

It was founded in 1952 as the ‘Aetos’ Skydra Football Club, (Greek: Ποδοσφαιρικός Σύλλογος «Αετός» Σκύδρας) and was later renamed the Skydra Sports Club ‘Aetos’ (Greek: Αθλητικός Σύλλογος Σκύδρας «ο Αετός»). Initially, it competed in the competitions organised by the Imathia Football Clubs Association and, from 1972 onwards, in those of the local Pella Football Clubs Association. From 1996 to 2000, it competed in the Third National Division in the northern group, returning to the division again in 2010.

The 2011–12 Gamma Ethniki season proved unfortunate for the team, as Aetos Skydra was penalised by the Greek Football Federation with an 11-point deduction and was relegated to the Fourth National Division without managing to make up the 11-point deficit, finishing in 12th place – the bottom spot – with -4 points. In the 2013–14 season, the club did not register to take part in the league and effectively ceased to exist. In the summer of 2014, the club Neos Aetos Skydras was founded.

== Memorable footballers ==
Here are some notable footballers who have played for the club:

- (Greece) Petros Ravousis
- (Greece) Charalampos Pavlidis
- (Greece) Aris Karasavvidis
- (Greece) Theofilos Karasavvidis
- (Greece) Anestis Argyriou
- (Greece) Nikos Kyzeridis
- (Greece) Konstantinos Inebolidis
- (Socialist Federal Republic of Yugoslavia) (Serbia) Dragan Mitrovic
