= P.A.O. Rouf =

- Full name: Podosfairikós Athlitikós Ómilos Rouf
- Nickname: Aoustria
- Founded: 1947; 79 years ago
- Ground: Rouf Municipal Stadium
- Capacity: 1,600
- Chairman: Theodoros Kounadis
- Manager: Georgios Archontakis
- League: Gamma Ethniki
- 2025–26: Athens FCA First Division (Group 1), 1st (promoted)
- Website: http://www.paorouf.gr/
Home colours	Away colours

P.A.O. Rouf (Greek: Ποδοσφαιρικός Αθλητικός Όμιλος Ρουφ; English: Football Athletic Club Rouf) is a Greek football club, based in Rouf, Athens. It was founded in 1947 and has played in its traditional colours of red and white since its creation in 1947, after the end of World War II. Their current stadium is the Rouf Municipal Stadium-Dimitris Giannakopoulos, seating 1,600 spectators.

== History ==
In 1968, Amyna Rouf and Erigona merged with Rouf.

In 2009, they were promoted to Gamma Ethniki. During the 2011–12 season, it played in the Football League 2 - South and spent their third consecutive season in the third tier of Greek football.

The average attendance at Rouf's home games in the 2011–12 season was 467, an increase from the 2010–11 season by 109. Dimitris Arnoutis was the manager and head coach of the club and enjoyed a run of success since taking over from Michalis Papadopoulos in late 2007. He was the longest serving manager at the club since Costas Gianakis from 1956 to 1970.

In the 2023–24 season, the club played in the Gamma Ethniki after relegating from 2022–23 Super League Greece 2.

== Ranking history ==
- 1972: Second Division - Group 2: 3rd
- 1973: Second Division - Group 1: 3rd
- 1974: Second Division - Group 1: 9th
- 1975: Second Division - Group 1: 14th - relegated
- 2009: Delta Ethniki - Group 8: 1st (57 pts)
- 2010–11: Football League 2 - South Group: 11th
- 2011–12: Football League 2 - South Group: 12th - relegated

== Season to season ==
- 1961 – 62: Athens Division A2
- 1969 – 75: Division 2
- 1995 – 96: Athens Division 2
- 2002 – 09: Athens FCA
- 2009 – 12: League 2
- 2012 – 13: League 3

== League history ==
Season	Tier 1	Tier 2	Tier 3	Tier 4	Tier 5	Tier 6	Tier 7	Tier 8	Pts.	Pl.	W	L	T	GS	GA	Diff.	Greek Cup
1957–58							6		65	30	42	33					
1958–59							14		30	17	21	28					
1960–61							12		54	25	31	24					
1961–62						1			25	67							
1963–64							11		56	30	39	46					
1964–65							12		57	30	48	50					
1965–66							6		71	24	58	50					
1975–76					2 (G1)				49	30	61	18					unknown
1976–77					4 (G1)				43	32	51	22					unknown
1977–78					1				63	38	95	36					unknown

== Cup appearances ==
- Athens Cup:
  - 1976: Defeated Kallithea 3–2
  - 2002: Defeated Thrasyvoulos 1–0
  - 2009: Defeated Olympiakos Neon Liosion 2–1
- Greek Cup:
  - 1976: Niki Volos - PAO Rouf: 2-1
