= Kozani F.C. =

Association football club in Greece

Kozani
- Full name: Filathlo Somatio Kozani
- Nickname: Sourdoi (Deafs)
- Founded: 1964; 62 years ago
- Ground: Kozani Municipal Stadium
- Capacity: 2.855
- President: Nikos Delialis
- Manager: Nikolaos Katakalidis
- League: Kozani FCA First Division
- 2025–26: Gamma Ethniki (Group 2), 10th (relegated)
Home colours	Away colours

Kozani Football Club (Greek: Φ.Σ. Κοζάνη) is a Greek football club from Kozani, Greece. The club was founded in April 1964 in Kozani, Greece following the merger between Makedonikos (founded in 1928) and Olympiakos Kozanis (founded in 1928) and since then it has won the Delta Ethniki a record 5 times. The club plays in Kozani FCA First Division, the fourth tier of Greek football.

== History ==
The football section of Kozani is one of the sections in sports that hasn't achieved a lot in the Greek football league for the city of Kozani, resulting the team to be 5 times champions in the Fourth Division (1995, 1997, 2004, 2009, 2013) and win the promotion to the Third Division with some good performances in the past years. They also finished 3rd three more times in 1988, 1990 and 1998 where they lost promotion in the last games.

After the 2005-06 season, the club, was relegated to Delta Ethniki (4th tier) after failing to win the last game away at Drama. However, the crucial match tο avoid the relegation was against Polykastro at home where the team drew 1-1 instead of winning and staying in the division.

In the 2006–07 season, the club played in the Delta Ethniki where it finished in the 8th place. In the 2007–08 season, the club remained another year in the Delta Ethniki and finished 3rd. In the 2008–09 season, the club played again in the Delta Ethniki and won promotion to the Gamma Ethniki (3rd tier). In the 2009–10 season, the club finished 13th in the North Group and remained in the Gamma Ethniki. In the 2010–11 season, the club finished 16th and relegated to Delta Ethniki. In the 2011–12 season, the club played in the Delta Ethniki where it finished in the 4th place. In the 2012–13 season, the club won promotion to the Gamma Ethniki as the Delta Ethniki was merged with Gamma Ethniki in one tier. During the 2013–14 season they competed in the new "Gamma Ethniki" (3rd amateur league). The following year (2014–15) they were ranked 10th in the Gamma Erasitehniki, too. After a disappointing season, Kozani finished 10th in the 2015–16 Gamma Ethniki in the Group 1, and the club was relegated to Kozani FCA championship. In the 2019–20 season, the club won the promotion to the Gamma Ethniki. In 2023, Kozani participated in the promotion play-offs of Gamma Ethniki (3rd tier), after winning their respective group, and won promotion to Super League Greece 2. In 2023-24, relegated again to 3rd amateur tier.

== Crest and colours ==
In the emblem the team kept the date both teams were founded in 1928 and took the colours of Olympiakos Kozanis (red) and Makedonikos (white). The emblem of Kozani is the big clock of the Town Hall.

== Stadium ==
Kozani plays its home games at the Municipal Stadium of Kozani (Δημοτικό Στάδιο Κοζάνης). The stadium holds 2,655 and was built in 1955

== Honours ==
=== Domestic ===
- Third Division: 2
  - 1980–81, 2022–23
- Fourth Division: 5
  - 1994–95, 1996–97, 2003–04, 2008–09, 2012–13
- Kozani FCA Champions: 1
  - 2019–20
- Kozani FCA Cup Winners: 6
  - 1992–93, 1994–95, 2007–08, 2012–13, 2022–23, 2025–26
- Kozani FCA Super Cup Winners: 2
  - 2013, 2020
- Nortwestern Macedonia FCA Champions: 3
  - 1964–65, 1972–73, 1973–74
- Northwestern Macedonia FCA Cup Winners: 1
  - 1977–78
