= Doxa Kranoula F.C. =

Doxa Kranoula
- Full name: Athlitiki Enosi Doxa Kranoula
- Founded: 1971
- Ground: Kranoula Stadium; Kranoula, Ioannina, Greece
- Capacity: 500
- League: Epirus FCA First Division
- 2025–26: Epirus FCA First Division, 10th

Doxa Kranoula F.C. (Greek: Α.Ε. Δόξα Κρανούλας) is a Greek football club, based in Kranoula, Ioannina.The colours of the team is orange, blue and white.

== History ==
Doxa Kranoula played in Delta Ethniki for 5 years.

Doxa Kranoula played in the Greek professional league (Football League 2) for the first time in its history during the 2009–10 season, after winning the 5th Group of the Delta Ethniki during 2008–09. The club achieved 66 points in 32 games and 19 account wins, 9 draws and 4 loss, leaving behind the Nafpaktiakos Asteras and Tilikratis FC.Kranoula relegated after 5 years in Football League 2. After winning the title in the local division, 2016–17, the club promoted to Gamma Ethniki again.

== Honors ==
=== Domestic Titles and honors ===
  - Epirus FCA Champions: 2
    - 2003–04, 2016–17
  - Epirus FCA Cup Winners: 1
    - 2005–06
  - Epirus FCA Super Cup Winners: 1
    - 2016-17
