= Pontioi Katerini F.C. =

Association football club in Greece

P.A.E. Pontioi Katerini
- Full name: Politistiki Athlitiki Enosi Pontioi Katerini 2012
- Short name: P.A.E. Pontioi Katerini 2012
- Founded: 1977; 49 years ago; (as Morfotiki Athlitiki Enosi Pontioi Katerini); 2012; 14 years ago; (as Politistiki Athlitiki Enosi Pontioi Katerini 2012)
- Ground: Nea Zoi Katerini Municipal Stadium "Theodoros Papadopoulos"
- Capacity: 600
- Manager: Georgios Kamperidis
- League: Pieria FCA First Division
- 2025–26: Pieria FCA First Division, 4th
Home colours	Away colours

Politistiki Athlitiki Enosi Pontioi Katerini 2012 (Greek: Πολιτιστική Αθλητική Ένωση Ποντίων Κατερίνης 2012) is a football club based in Katerini, Greece. Its colours are yellow and black. The home games of the team are taking place at the Nea Zoi Katerini Municipal Stadium "Theodoros Papadopoulos".

== History ==
Morfotiki Athlitiki Enosi Pontion Katerinis (Greek: Μορφωτική Αθλητική Ένωση Ποντίων Κατερίνης) was founded in 1977. In 2010, the club promoted from Delta Ethniki, as champion of Group 3, and competed in Football League 2. The club had won twice the regional championship of Pieria Football Clubs Association, gaining a place in Delta Ethniki, once in 1993–94 and again in 2008–09. The club had also won the regional federation cup thrice in 1985–86, 2008–09 and 2009–10.

Former crest

=== Merger with G.S. Iraklis Thessalonikis (2012) ===
In June 2011, Iraklis Thessaloniki was demoted from Super League to Delta Ethniki, due to financial problems. While competing in Delta Ethniki, G.S. Iraklis Thessalonikis board reached an agreement with M.A.E. Pontion Katerinis for a merger between the two clubs. On 20 January 2012, the merger was approved by G.S. Iraklis Thessalonikis, and their football team (Iraklis Thessaloniki) withdrew from Delta Ethniki. M.A.E. Pontion Katerinis changed their name to A.E.P. Iraklis 1908, took the badge and colors of G.S. Iraklis Thessalonikis and moved to Kaftanzoglio Stadium. The new squad consisted of players from both teams and initially trained in Katerini. Virtually, A.E.P. Iraklis 1908 replaced M.A.E. Pontion Katerinis in the 2011–12 Football League 2.

=== Refounding of the original club ===
The football club was refounded in 2012 as Politistiki Athlitiki Enosi Pontion Katerinis 2012.

== Honours ==
=== Domestic ===
- Pieria FCA Championship
  - Winners (2): 1993–94, 2008–09
- Pieria FCA Cup
  - Winners (3): 1985–86, 2008–09, 2009–10
