= Anagennisi Giannitsa F.C. =

Greek football club

Anagennisi Giannitsa
- Full name: Π.Α.Σ. Αναγέννηση Γιαννιτσών 2025; P.A.S. Anagennisi Giannitsa 2025
- Nickname: Blue Boys
- Founded: 1961; 65 years ago
- Ground: Giannitsa Stadium
- Capacity: 8,000
- Chairman: Nikos Papourtzis
- Manager: Avraam Zimpidis
- League: Pella FCA Third Division
- 2025–26: Pella FCA Third Division, 4th
Home colours	Away colours

Anagennisi Giannitsa is a Greek football club, based in Giannitsa. They compete in the second Division of Pella at the municipal seat stadium in the city of Giannitsa. In their 64-year history, the team has never played in the Super League Greece. The team's colors are blue and white.

== History ==
Anagennisi Giannitsa were officially founded in 1961 with the full name "Gymnastics Athletic Association Anagennisi Giannitsa". Their foundation was the result of the love of the football-loving world of Giannitsa, who wanted a strong team, present in football events. In the past there were in the area the clubs "Apollo Giannitsa" founded in 1928, "Renaissance Giannitsa" founded in 1939 and short-lived. In 1948, "Apollon Giannitsson" were founded again, with the then mayor of the city, Kostas Stamkos, as president.

Between the years 1950 and 1951, there was a lot of football activity in the local community, with the establishment of four clubs that were the forerunners of the current group. These were Megas Alexandros Giannitsa, Iraklis Giannitsa, AOK Giannitsa (Sports Club of Kariotes) and the Pontiac Youth. In 1955, a process of merging the local teams began, resulting in the emergence of two dominant clubs by 1960, Makedonikos Giannitsa and Pontiaki Neola. Finally, in 1961, Macedonikos Giannitsa and Pontiac Youth merged, resulting in the creation of Anagennisi Giannirsa.

The rationale behind the establishment of the club was for the club of Anagennisi to function as a mixture of the city and the wider province. And that's the point. The team do not operate in competition with the other teams, but as a promotion station for the players of the town.

=== The course of Anagennisi ===
They started playing in the local league of Central Macedonia and made their first appearance in the second national division in the 1964–65 season, winning the 1st place in the 4th group, which is the highest ranking in their history so far. They did not manage to get the promotion to the first national division, as in the final phase they finished in the third place among the winning teams of each group.

In 1974, after 10 years of presence in the second division, Anagennisi were relegated to the local leagues, to return to the second division in 1978, where they remained until 1983, when they experienced relegation again, despite the fact that two years earlier (1981) they had finished second. They competed for 4 years in the third division, but their decline continued, as in 1988 and 1989 they were in the fourth division. In the 1988–89 season, Anagennisi won their first domestic title, the Greek Amateur Cup.

In 1989–90 they returned to the third national division, won the championship in the Northern group under coach Georgios Firos, to follow another four years of presence in the second division, until 1993–94, when they were relegated to the third division. From 1997, a new downward trend followed as for the following decade the team found itself moving between the 4th national and local championships of EPS Pella.

They returned to the third division in 2007, where they finished 8th in the standings. In 2011-12 and 2012-13 they competed again in the second division (Football League). Anagennisi Giannitsa came 2nd in the second division twice, in the 1964–65 season and in the 1980–81 season. The team emerged as the champion of the third division once and the fourth division twice, and they won the Greek amateur cup in the 1989–90 season with Foiros as coach and Iosifidis as their president.

Anagennisi are among the top 30 teams in points collection in the second division and also in the first 30 teams in the third division, despite being away from these division for years.

In the institution of the Greek Cup, Anagennisi Giannitsa do not have to demonstrate any particular success, as they has never progressed at least to the quarter-final phase of any competition.

In April 2022, after a very bad run, the team were relegated to the local A1 division of Pella. Characteristic of the very bad course of the team, were the only 7 points they collected in the 2nd round of the championship, with a total collection of 22 points.

=== Merger with A.S. Giannitsa ===
In July 2019, and while the risk of dissolution was visible, as the historical Anagennisi Giannitsa had been relegated to the second division of the local league (A' Division EPS Pellas), they merged with A.S. Giannitsa, who competed in the championship of the third national division, creating the "Anagennisi Giannitsa Sports Club". From the 2019–20 season, Anagennisi Giannitsa returned to the national championships, participating in the third national division.

From September 2021, the team again started using the name "A.S. Giannitsa". The team was based on young talented kids from their hometown and the surrounding area,. Indicative of this effort is that in a cup match they beat Edessaikos, in the local derby of Pella, with 5–0. The main goal of the team is the return of fans to the field, the promotion of new footballers from the team's academies and its establishment in the professional categories.

== Honours ==
- Gamma Ethniki (Third Division) (1):

1990

- Delta Ethniki (Fourth Division), Group 1/2 (2):

1989, 2007

- Pella FCA League (2)

1978, 2004

- Pella FCA Cup (10)

1975, 1977, 1978, 1988, 1989, 1994, 1999, 2000, 2005, 2022

== Fans ==
The associations of Anagennisi Giannitsa fans were "BLUE BOYS" and "CROWS". They actively attended all the matches of Anagennisi. From 2000 onwards, the two associations were united into one, under the name S.F.A.G. (Fan Association of Anagennisi Giannitsa) which has left history for the stands both in home and away games. There are also sports fans in Thessaloniki who are making similar efforts to organize an association.

== Notable players ==
- (Greece) Dimitris Tombazis
- (Greece) Giorgos Dimitriadis
- (Greece) Giorgos Tsimpinis
- (Greece) Giorgos Moustakas
- (Greece) Makis Tsanidis
- (Greece) Vasilios Baxevanos
- (Greece) George Tsimpinis

== Notable Managers ==
- (Greece) Georgios Firos
- (Greece) Savvas Kofidis
- (Greece) Alekos Papadopoulos
- (Greece) Petros Ravousis
- (Greece) Giannis Tzifopoulos
- (Greece) Giannis Gyrichidis
