= Megas Alexandros Irakleia F.C. =

Megas Alexandros Irakleias
- Full name: MGS Megas Alexandros Irakleias
- Founded: 1928
- Ground: Irakleia Municipal Stadium, Irakleia, Serres, Greece
- Capacity: 3,200
- League: Serres FCA
- 2025–26: Serres FCA First Division, 14th (relegated)
- Website: http://megasfc-academy.blogspot.com/
Home colours	Away colours

Megas Alexandros Irakleias (Greek: Μέγας Αλέξανδρος Ηράκλειας) is a Greek football club, based in Irakleia, Serres.

The men's team played in the second highest league, the Beta Ethniki, in 1963–64 and 1964–65.

After playing on the third tier, Megas Alexandros Irakleias was relegated from the 2011–12 Football League 2, succumbing in a playoff against Proodeftiki. The relegation brought the future of the team into doubt.
