= Delta Ethniki =

Defunct fourth-tier men's association football league in Greece

- Organising body: Hellenic Football Federation
- Founded: 1982; 44 years ago
- First season: Erasitexniki Ethniki Katigoria, Greek: Ερασιτεχνική Εθνική Κατηγορία, lit. 'Amateur National Division' (1982–83); Delta Ethniki Katigoria, Greek: Δ΄ Εθνική Κατηγορία, lit. 'Fourth National Division' (1987–88)
- Folded: 2013; 13 years ago
- Country: Greece
- Confederation: UEFA
- Number of clubs: 107 (2012–13)
- Level on pyramid: 4
- Promotion to: Gamma Ethniki
- Relegation to: Football Clubs Associations Championships
- Domestic cup: Greece Amateurs Cup
- Last champions: Aris Akropotamos (Group 1); Iraklis Ampelokipi (Group 2); Kozani (Group 3); Lamia (Group 4); Mesologgi (Group 5); Panopoulo (Group 6); Ermionida (Group 7); Egaleo (Group 8); Ionikos (Group 9); Atsalenios (Group 10) (2012–13)

The Delta Ethniki Katigoria (Greek: Δ΄ Εθνική Κατηγορία, lit. 'Fourth National Division') was the fourth-tier men's association football league in Greece. During the period of its existence, it was the lowest national division of the Greek championship. It was founded in the 1982–83 season and abolished in the 2012–13 season, as it was merged with the third division (Football League 2). Its history therefore spans 31 years.

Many historical clubs of first division (Super League) have played in Delta Ethniki, such as Iraklis Thessaloniki (2011–12 season), Ethnikos Piraeus, Apollon Smyrnis and Atromitos. The clubs of Delta Ethniki were divided in groups on the basis of geographical criteria. The groups usually comprised 10 teams, though this number varied between 4 and 12 over the years.

== Champions ==
Below follows the list of the champions by year.

Season	Groups	Clubs	Champions
1982–83	7	137	A.O. Neapolis Piraeus, P.A.O. Thriamvos Neos Kosmos, Anagennisi Arta, Pannafpliakos, Pontioi Kozani, Polykastro, Aspida Xanthi
1983–84	7	126	Aias Salamina, Charavgiakos, Kerkyra, Panarkadikos, Elassona, Poseidon Nea Michaniona, Iraklis Kavala
1984–85	7	126	Ergotelis, Ilioupoli, A.O. Agrinio, Kalamata, Achilleas Farsala, A.E. Alexandria, Panthrakikos
1985–86	7	131	Peramaikos, Olympiacos Chalkida, A.P.S. Patra, Panargiakos, Pyrsos Grevena, Megas Alexandros Thessaloniki, Nestos Chrisoupoli
1986–87	7	130	Aris Nikaia, Enosi Atromitou-Rethymniakou, Messiniakos, Achaiki, Anagennisi Kolindros, Anagennisi Neapoli Thessaloniki, Pandramaikos
1987–88	4	73	Achilleas Farsala, Asteras Ampelokipoi, A.O. Sparti, P.A.O. Thriamvos
1988–89	4	70	Pontioi Veria, Anagennisi Giannitsa, Panetolikos, Rodos
1989–90	6	116	Aspida Xanthi, Anagennisi Chalkidona, Lamia, Paniliakos, Aris Nikaia, Haidari
1990–91	10	218	Pandramaikos, Posidonas Nea Michaniona, Panargiakos Argos Orestiko, A.P.S. Patra, Apollon Larissa, Fostiras, Rodos, Pannafpliakos, Anagennisi Arta, Posidonas Iraklio
1991–92	12	231	Irodotos, Aiolikos, Ethnikos Asteras, Chalkida, Panarkadikos, Fokikos, Kerkyra, Anagennisi Karditsa, Kilkisiakos, Odysseas Kordelio, Pontioi Kozani, Ethnikos Alexandroupoli
1992–93	12	217	Chania, Ialysos, Acharnaikos, Keratsini, Erani Filiatra, A.P.S. Patra, Velissarios Ioannina, Niki Volos, Apollon Krya Vrysi, Keravnos Kolchiko, Iraklis Ptolemaida, Nestos Chrysoupoli
1993–94	12	215	Agios Nikolaos, Varvasiakos Chios, Fostiras, Chalkida, AO Sparti, A.E.Messolonghi, PAS Acheron Kanallaki, Lamia, Almopos Aridaea, Agrotikos Asteras, Tyrnavos, Orestis Orestiada
1994–95	8	146	Enosi Rodou-Diagoras, G.S. Marko, A.O. Pyrgos 79, Panegialios, Fokikos, Kozani, Ampelokipi Thessaloniki, Nigrita
1995–96	6	110	Egaleo, Ergotelis, Nafpaktiakos Asteras, Kerkyra, Iraklis Ptolemaidas, Lykoi
1996–97	6	108	Agia Eleousa, Keratsini, Pamisos Messini, Preveza, Kozani, Orfeas Alexandroupoli
1997–98	6	107	Atromitos, Argesani Naxos, Achaiki, Karditsa, Apollon Krya Vrysi, Kilkisiakos
1998–99	6	108	Akratitos, Chalkidona, Leonidio, Thesprotos, Ethnikos Katerini, A.S. Neapolis Thessaloniki
1999–2000	4	64	Acharnaikos, Patraikos, Lamia, Ampelokipi Thessaloniki
2000–01	4	64	Fostiras, Chania, Kerkyra, Kassandra
2001–02	4	65	Thrasyvoulos, Levadiakos, Niki Volos, Agrotikos Asteras
2002–03^{a}	10	159	Doxa Drama, Pontiakos Nea Santa, Veria, Pierikos, Averof Ioannina, Chalkida, Rodos, Ilisiakos, Thyella Patra, Atsalenios
2003–04	10	159	Pandramaikos, Thermaikos, Kozani, Apollon Larissa, Panetolikos, Lamia, A.O. Mani Piraeus, Haidari, Achaiki, Irodotos
2004–05	10	153	Panthrakikos, Polykastro, Pierikos, Trikala, AE Giannena, Messiniakos, Diagoras, Aiolikos, Asteras Tripolis, Ionia Chania
2005–06	10	159	Doxa Gratini, PAO Neoi Epivates, Ethnikos Katerini, Odysseas Androutsos, Nafpaktiakos Asteras, Zakynthos, Thiva, Ilioupoli, Koropi, O.F. Ierapetra
2006–07	10	156	Prosotsani, Anagennisi Giannitsa, Ptolemaida-Lignitorychoi, Olympiacos Volos, Preveza, Panegialios, Korinthos, Fostiras, Aias Salamina, Neos Asteras Rethymno
2007–08	10	160	Odysseas Anagennisi, Makedonikos, Pyrsos, Fokikos, Ethnikos Filippiada, Zakynthos, Panargiakos, Agia Paraskevi, Keravnos Keratea, Chersonissos
2008–09	10	161	Visaltiakos Nigrita, Anagennisi Epanomi, Kozani, Trikala, Doxa Kranoula, Panegialios, Enosi Panaspropyrgiakou Doxas, Rouf, Saronikos, Platanias
2009–10	10	161	Megas Alexandros Irakleia Serres, Aetos Skydra, Pontioi Katerini, Tyrnavos, Nafpaktiakos Asteras, Paniliakos, Iraklis Psachna, Apollon Smyrnis, AEL Kalloni, Chania
2010–11	10	157	Ethnikos Gazoros, Apollon Pontus, Vataniakos, Oikonomos Tsaritsani, Tilikratis, Kalamata, Asteras Magoula, PAOK Glyfada, Proodeftiki, Rouvas
2011–12	10	141	Ethnikos Sidirokastro, Odysseas Kordelio, Platamon Academy, Anagennisi Karditsa, Kassiopi, Panegialios, Korinthos, Fostiras, Acharnaikos, Episkopi
2012–13	10	107	Aris Akropotamos, Iraklis Ambelokipi, Kozani, Lamia, A.E.Messolonghi, Panopoulo F.C., A.E. Ermionida, Egaleo, Ionikos, Atsalenios
(from 2013)	-	-	(Defunct).

== Performance by club (1982–2013) ==
Champions	Club	Winning Years
5	Fostiras	1990–91, 1993–94, 2000–01, 2006–07, 2011–12
5	Kozani	1994–95, 1996–97, 2003–04, 2008–09, 2012–13
5	Lamia	1989–90, 1993–94, 1999–2000, 2003–04, 2012–13
4	Kerkyra	1983–84, 1991–92, 1995–96, 2000–01
4	Panegialios	1994–95, 2006–07, 2008–09, 2011–12
3	A.P.S Patra	1985–86, 1990–91, 1992–93
3	Chalkida	1991–92, 1993–94, 2002–03
3	Rodos	1988–89, 1990–91, 2002–03
3	Pandramaikos	1986–87, 1990–91, 2003–04
3	Achaiki	1986–87, 1997–98, 2003–04
3	Fokikos	1991–92, 1994–95, 2007–08
3	Nafpaktiakos Asteras	1995–96, 2005–06, 2009–10
3	Acharnaikos	1992–93, 1999–2000, 2011–12
2	Achilleas Farsala	1984–85, 1987–88
2	P.A.O. Thriamvos	1982–83, 1987–88
2	Aspida Xanthi	1982–83, 1989–90
2	Aris Nikaia	1986–87, 1989–90
2	Posidon Nea Michaniona	1983–84, 1990–91
2	Pannafpliakos	1982–83, 1990–91
2	Anagennisi Arta	1982–83, 1990–91
2	Panarkadikos	1983–84, 1991–92
2	Pontioi Kozani	1982–83, 1991–92
2	Nestos Chrisoupoli	1985–86, 1992–93
2	AO Sparti	1987–88, 1993–94
2	Ergotelis	1984–85, 1995–96
2	Iraklis Ptolemaida	1992–93, 1995–96
2	Keratsini	1992–93, 1996–97
2	Apollon Krya Vrysi	1992–93, 1997–98
2	Kilkisiakos	1991–92, 1997–98
2	Ampelokipoi Thessaloniki	1994–95, 1999–2000
2	Niki Volos	1992–93, 2001–02
2	Agrotikos Asteras	1993–94, 2001–02
2	Apollon Larissa	1990–91, 2003–04
2	Panetolikos	1988–89, 2003–04
2	Haidari	1989–90, 2003–04
2	Irodotos	1991–92, 2003–04
2	Panthrakikos	1984–85, 2004–05
2	Polykastro	1982–83, 2004–05
2	Pierikos	2002–03, 2004–05
2	Messiniakos	1986–87, 2004–05
2	Aiolikos	1991–92, 2004–05
2	Ethnikos Katerini	1998–99, 2005–06
2	Ilioupoli	1984–85, 2005–06
2	Anagennisi Giannitsa	1988–89, 2006–07
2	Preveza	1996–97, 2006–07
2	Aias Salamina	1983–84, 2006–07
2	Pyrsos	1985–86, 2007–08
2	Zakynthos	2005–06, 2007–08
2	Panargiakos	1985–86, 2007–08
2	Trikala	2004–05, 2008–09
2	Tyrnavos	1993–94, 2008–09
2	Paniliakos	1989–90, 2009–10
2	Chania	1992–93, 2009–10
2	Kalamata	1984–85, 2010–11
2	Odysseas Kordelio	1991–92, 2011–12
2	Anagennisi Karditsa	1991–92, 2011–12
2	Korinthos	2006–07, 2011–12
2	A.E.Messolonghi	1993–94, 2012–13
2	Egaleo	1995–96, 2012–13
2	Atsalenios	2002–03, 2012–13
1	106 teams	(from 2013 not exists)

== Seasons in Delta Ethniki ==
Too many clubs have played in the championship of Delta Ethniki during the years that existed. Below follows a list with the clubs with the most number of seasons in Delta Ethniki.

Club	Seasons
Achaiki	25
Atsalenios	24
Preveza, A.O. Karditsa, Pamisos Messini	23
Moshato, Tilikratis, Asteras Amaliadas	22
Nestos Chrysoupoli	21
Aetos Skydra, Pandramaikos, Apollon Larissa	20

== Notes ==
^a That year the champions clubs played play-off games so as to promote to the third division. The scores were: Ilisiakos - Chalkida 2–1, Doxa Drama - Averof Ioannina 5–2, Pierikos - Rodos 0–2, Pontiakos Nea Santa - Thyella Patra 2–4, Veria - Atsalenios 2–1

== See also ==
- Greek football league system
- Greek Football Amateur Cup
- Football records and statistics in Greece
