= Odysseas Anagennisi F.C. =

Odysseas F.C.
- Full name: Odysseas Anagennisis Football Club
- Founded: 1952
- Ground: Anagennisi Municipal Stadium
- Capacity: 3,000
- League: —
- 2023-24: —

Odysseas Football Club is a Greek football club, based in Anagennisi, Serres Prefecture, Macedonia.

The association was founded in 1952. In 2009, they played in Gamma Ethniki and after three years the team didn't exist.

(*not to be confused with Anagenisi Karditsas F.C.)
