= 1983 Polish Super Cup =

Football competition

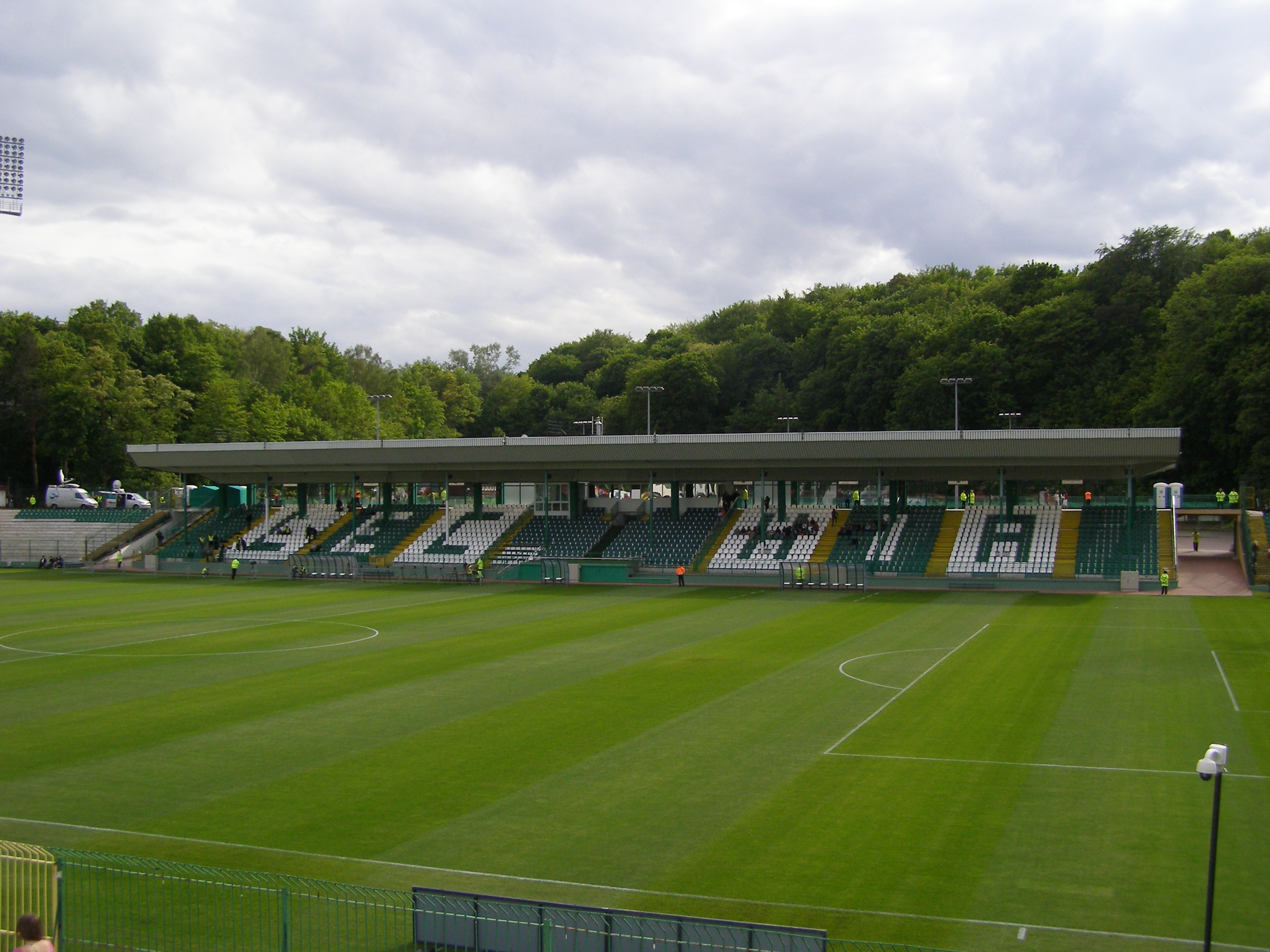
- The Gdańsk Sports Center Stadium in Gdańsk hosted the final.
Lechia Gdańsk	Lech Poznań
1	0
- Date: 30 July 1983
- Venue: Stadion MOSiR, Gdańsk
- Referee: Henryk Klocek (Kielce)
- Attendance: 12,000

The 1983 Polish Super Cup was the first ever Polish Super Cup (which would later be an annual Polish football match played between the reigning winners of the Ekstraklasa and Polish Cup) to be contested.

It was held on 30 July 1983 between the 1982–83 Ekstraklasa champions Lech Poznań and the 1982–83 Polish Cup winners Lechia Gdańsk at the home of the Polish Cup winners Lechia, the Stadion MOSiR in Gdańsk. Due to this being the inaugural Super Cup, it was both teams first appearance in the competition.

Lechia won 1–0 to win the Super Cup title.

== History ==
The idea of a Polish Super Cup came from the annual cup competition held in England between the league champions and the FA Cup winners, with the two teams playing for the FA Community Shield. The first edition was to be held between Szombierki Bytom and Legia Warsaw with the date scheduled to be on 22 June 1980. The fixture however never took place, either due to sporting reasons or geopolitical, social and economic reasons at the time, and the implementation of a Super Cup was not tried again for three years.

The idea was thought of again in 1983 when third division side Lechia Gdańsk unexpectedly won the Polish Cup. Activists of Lechia pushed for the creation of the Super Cup, and with both Lechia and the Champions of Poland, Lech, both having a week available for a game before the start of the following season agreed to hold the inaugural Super Cup competition.

While the game was seen as an entertaining spectacle and was enjoyed by the crowd in Gdańsk, it was not until 1987 when the Polish Football Association with the help of the Gloria Victis Foundation (who helped fund the competition while the cups proceeds went to the foundation), before the Super Cup became an annual competition in Poland.

== Match ==
30 July 1983
17:00 CEST (UTC+02:00)

Lechia Gdańsk	1–0	Lech Poznań
Jerzy Kruszczyński 88'

Stadion MOSiR, Gdańsk
Attendance: 12,000
Referee: Henryk Klocek (Kielce)

Lechia Gdańsk	Lech Poznań

GK	(Poland) Tadeusz Fajfer
DF	(Poland) Andrzej Marchel
DF	(Poland) Lech Kulwicki
DF	(Poland) Andrzej Salach
DF	(Poland) Dariusz Raczyński
MF	(Poland) Aleksander Cybulski
MF	(Poland) Jacek Grembocki
MF	(Poland) Dariusz Wójtowicz
FW	(Poland) Maciej Kaminski
FW	(Poland) Jerzy Kruszczyński
FW	(Poland) Ryszard Polak
Manager:
(Poland) Jerzy Jastrzębowski

GK	(Poland) Jan Szczech
DF	(Poland) Henryk Pałka
DF	(Poland) Ryszard Kałużyński
DF	(Poland) Adam Wilczek
DF	(Poland) Jan Mirka
MF	(Poland) Andrzej Sliz
MF	(Poland) Marcin Żemajtis
MF	(Poland) Zbigniew Żurek
MF	(Poland) Marian Czernohorski
FW	(Poland) Marek Majka
FW	(Poland) Marian Brzezoń	(substituted off) 76'
Substitutes:
FW	(Poland) Henryk Tkocz	(substituted on) 76'
Manager:
(Poland) Teodor Wieczorek

== Trophy ==
The trophy was funded by the Katowice Daily Sport newspaper and was made by miners from the Szombierki Coal Mine out of a lump of coal. After Lechia won the trophy it was displayed in the club's conference room, due to this also being where the Pomeranian Football Association held their meetings. At some point the trophy was lost, it was not found again until 2014 in a slightly damaged condition and underwent renovation works. Currently the trophy is on display in the Lechia Museum at Stadion Gdańsk.

== See also ==
- 1983–84 Ekstraklasa
- 1983–84 Polish Cup
