= 1982–83 Polish Cup =

Puchar Polski

Tournament details
- Country: Poland
- Dates: 23 July 1982 – 22 June 1983
- Teams: 112

Final positions
- Champions: Lechia Gdańsk (1st title)
- Runners-up: Piast Gliwice

The 1982–83 Polish Cup was the 29th edition of the annual Polish football knockout tournament. It started on the 23 July 1982 and finished on 22 June 1983. The finalists were 2nd division Piast Gliwice and 3rd division Lechia Gdańsk, with Lechia Gdańsk winning the Polish Cup for the first time after winning the final 2–1.

== Round 1 ==
First round fixtures.

Team 1	Score	Team 2
Gwardia Białystok	3–0	Wigry Suwałki
Orzeł Łódź	0–3	Polonia Warsaw
Górnik II Konin	0–3	Włókniarz Pabianice
Lechia II Gdańsk	0–0 (a.e.t.) (3–4 p)	Stomil Olsztyn
Lubuszanin Trzcianka	3–2 (a.e.t.)	Lech II Poznań
Wisła II Płock	0–1	Pogoń Zduńska Wola
Błękitni II Kielce	0–1	Motor Praszka
Bug Wyszków	4–2	Chełmianka Chełm
Orzeł Wierzbica	0–1	Siarka Tarnobrzeg
Bzura Chodaków	2–3	Legia II Warsaw
Lechia Tomaszów Mazowiecki	1–3	Korona Kielce
Rawia Rawicz	1–4	Lechia Zielona Góra
Czarni Żagań	3–2	Chrobry Głogów
Pogoń II Szczecin	0–1	Stoczniowiec Barlinek
Czarni Nowa Wieś	1–3	Beskid Andrychów
Zimowit Zalesie	3–2	Czuwaj Przemyśl
Orzeł Lubawka	2–1	Zagłębie II Wałbrzych
LZS Grudynia Wielka	1–3	Śląsk II Wrocław
Piast Dobrzeń Wielki	2–1	Orzeł Niemodlin
Stal Jezierzyce	0–2	Elana Toruń
Start Radziejów	3–2 (a.e.t.)	BKS Bydgoszcz
Walcownia Czechowice-Dziedzice	4–1	Victoria Częstochowa
Metal Węgierska Górka	2–1	Górnik Libiąż
Kabel Kraków	1–0	Unia Tarnów
Zwierzyniecki Kraków	0–1 (a.e.t.)	Wisłoka Dębica
Ostrovia Ostrów Wielkopolski	0–1	Grunwald Poznań
Sandecja Nowy Sącz	4–1	Stal Sanok
Pomowiec Gronowo Elbląskie	3–1	Gedania Gdańsk
Pogoń Siedlce	0–2	AZF AWF Biała Podlaska
Wicher Kłodzino	1–2	Gwardia Koszalin
Hetman Zamość	0–1	Wisła Puławy

== Round 2 ==
Second round fixtures.

Team 1	Score	Team 2
Czarni Żagań	0–1 (a.e.t.)	GKS Tychy
Włókniarz Pabianice	0–1	Broń Radom
Polonia Warsaw	3–0	Polonia Bytom
Motor Praszka	2–2 (a.e.t.) (4–3 p)	ROW Rybnik
Korona Kielce	2–1	Raków Częstochowa
Metal Węgierska Górka	0–3	BKS Stal Bielsko-Biała
Orzeł Lubawka	2–1	Odra Opole
Piast Dobrzeń	0–6	Górnik Wałbrzych
Zimowit Zalesie	0–0 (a.e.t.) (11–10 p)	Resovia
AZS AWF Biała Podlaska	1–2	Avia Świdnik
Stoczniowiec Barlinek	2–0	Błękitni Stargard
Elana Toruń	3–3 (a.e.t.) (5–2 p)	Zawisza Bydgoszcz
Beskid Andrychów	2–6	GKS Katowice
Siarka Tarnobrzeg	1–0	Stal Rzeszów
Kabel Kraków	2–4	Cracovia
Wisłoka Dębica	0–1	Urania Ruda Śląska
Sandecja Nowy Sącz	1–3	Górnik Knurów
Walcownia Czechowice-Dziedzice	1–4	Piast Gliwice
Gwardia Białystok	1–0	Gwardia Szczytno
Stomil Olsztyn	1–0	Stoczniowiec Gdańsk
Start Radziejów	2–3 (a.e.t.)	Lechia Gdańsk
Mławianka Mława	0–1	Wisła Płock
Pomowiec Gronowo Elbląskie	0–4	Olimpia Elbląg
Wisła Puławy	1–2	Stal Stalowa Wola
Gwardia Koszalin	0–1	Gryf Słupsk
Lechia Zielona Góra	0–1 (a.e.t.)	Olimpia Poznań
Grunwald Poznań	1–0 (a.e.t.)	Stilon Gorzów Wielkopolski
Legia II Warsaw	4–3	Hutnik Kraków
Pogoń Zduńska Wola	0–1 (a.e.t.)	Błękitni Kielce
Bug Wyszków	1–1 (a.e.t.) (3–4 p)	Radomiak Radom
Śląsk II Wrocław	2–4	Zagłębie Wałbrzych
Lubuszanin Trzcianka	0–3	Stal Stocznia Szczecin

== Round 3 ==
Third round fixtures.

Team 1	Score	Team 2
Stoczniowiec Barlinek	1–2	Stal Stocznia Szczecin
Gwardia Białystok	0–1	Stomil Olsztyn
Grunwald Poznań	0–2	Wisła Płock
Lechia Gdańsk	2–1	Olimpia Elbląg
Olimpia Poznań	3–1	Gryf Słupsk
Korona Kielce	1–3	Stal Stalowa Wola
Elana Toruń	1–2	Polonia Warsaw
Błękitni Kielce	1–2	Cracovia
Motor Praszka	1–2	Piast Gliwice
Siarka Tarnobrzeg	2–0	Broń Radom
Orzeł Lubawka	1–2	Zagłębie Wałbrzych
Górnik Wałbrzych	2–0 (a.e.t.)	Górnik Knurów
Zimowit Zalesie	0–4	Avia Świdnik
Urania Ruda Śląska	3–1 (a.e.t.)	GKS Katowice
Legia II Warsaw	0–2	Radomiak Radom
BKS Stal Bielsko-Biała	0–2	GKS Tychy

== Round of 32 ==
Round of 32 fixtures. The teams from the Ekstraklasa are introduced. Due to the competitions rules they are all drawn away from home in this round.

Team 1	Score	Team 2
GKS Tychy	0–4	Legia Warsaw
Lechia Gdańsk	1–1 (a.e.t.) (5–4 p)	Widzew Łódź
Siarka Tarnobrzeg	0–0 (a.e.t.) (2–4 p)	Zagłębie Sosnowiec
Stal Stocznia Szczecin	1–0	ŁKS Łódź
Radomiak Radom	3–1	Motor Lublin
Olimpia Poznań	0–0 (a.e.t.) (3–4 p)	Szombierki Bytom
Zagłębie Wałbrzych	0–1 (a.e.t.)	Lech Poznań
Stomil Olsztyn	2–3 (a.e.t.)	Pogoń Szczecin
Polonia Warsaw	0–1	Ruch Chorzów
Stal Stalowa Wola	0–2	Śląsk Wrocław
Cracovia	2–2 (a.e.t.) (3–5 p)	Wisła Kraków
Piast Gliwice	4–2	Gwardia Warsaw
Wisła Płock	2–0	Arka Gdynia
Avia Świdnik	0–2	Górnik Zabrze
Górnik Wałbrzych	3–2 (a.e.t.)	Stal Mielec
Urania Ruda Śląska	1–4	Bałtyk Gdynia

== Round of 16 ==
Round of 16 fixtures.

Team 1	Score	Team 2
Piast Gliwice	2–1	Bałtyk Gdynia
Lechia Gdańsk	3–0 (a.e.t.)	Śląsk Wrocław
Wisła Płock	0–1	Lech Poznań
Pogoń Szczecin	0–1 (a.e.t.)	Zagłębie Sosnowiec
Szombierki Bytom	0–1	Wisła Kraków
Górnik Wałbrzych	0–2	Legia Warsaw
Stal Stocznia Szczecin	2–3	Ruch Chorzów
Radomiak Radom	1–4	Górnik Zabrze

== Quarter-finals ==
Quarter final fixtures.

Team 1	Score	Team 2
Lechia Gdańsk	1–0	Zagłębie Sosnowiec
Piast Gliwice	1–0	Wisła Kraków
Górnik Zabrze	0–1	Ruch Chorzów
Legia Warsaw	0–1	Lech Poznań

== Semi-finals ==
Semi final fixtures.

Team 1	Score	Team 2
Piast Gliwice	1–0	Lech Poznań
Lechia Gdańsk	0–0 (a.e.t.) (3–1 p)	Ruch Chorzów

== Final ==
22 June 1983
17:00 CEST (UTC+02:00)

Lechia Gdańsk	2–1	Piast Gliwice
Górski 9'; Kowalczyk 39'	Report	Kałużyński 42' (pen.)

Stadion XXXV-lecia PRL, Piotrków Trybunalski
Attendance: 17,000
Referee: Edward Norek (Kraków)

Lechia Gdańsk	Piast Gliwice

GK	(Poland) Tadeusz Fajfer
DF	(Poland) Andrzej Marchel
DF	(Poland) Lech Kulwicki
DF	(Poland) Andrzej Salach
DF	(Poland) Dariusz Raczyński
MF	(Poland) Zbigniew Kowalski	(substituted off) 40'
MF	(Poland) Dariusz Wójtowicz
MF	(Poland) Jacek Grembocki
MF	(Poland) Marek Kowalczyk
FW	(Poland) Krzysztof Górski
FW	(Poland) Ryszard Polak	(substituted off) 65'
Substitutes:
MF	(Poland) Roman Józefowicz	(substituted on) 40'
FW	(Poland) Jarosław Klinger	(substituted on) 65'
Manager:
(Poland) Jerzy Jastrzębowski

GK	(Poland) Jan Szczech
DF	(Poland) Henryk Pałka
DF	(Poland) Ryszard Kałużyński
DF	(Poland) Adam Wilczek
DF	(Poland) Jan Mirka
MF	(Poland) Andrzej Sliz
MF	(Poland) Marcin Żemajtis
MF	(Poland) Zbigniew Żurek
MF	(Poland) Marian Czernohorski
FW	(Poland) Marek Majka
FW	(Poland) Marian Brzezoń	(substituted off) 76'
Substitutes:
FW	(Poland) Henryk Tkocz	(substituted on) 76'
Manager:
(Poland) Teodor Wieczorek

The Polish Cup was won by Lechia Gdańsk.

== Bracket ==
1st Round
Piast Gliwice	4
Gwardia Warsaw	2
Urania Ruda Śląska	1
Bałtyk Gdynia	4
Olimpia Poznań	0 (3)
Szombierki Bytom	0 (4)
Cracovia	2 (3)
Wisła Kraków	2 (5)
Górnik Wałbrzych	3
Stal Mielec	2
GKS Tychy	0
Legia Warsaw	4
Wisła Płock	2
Arka Gdynia	0
Zagłębie Wałbrzych	0
Lech Poznań	1
Lechia Gdańsk	1 (5)
Widzew Łódź	1 (4)
Stal Stalowa Wola	0
Śląsk Wrocław	2
Stomil Olsztyn	2
Pogoń Szczecin	3
Siarka Tarnobrzeg	0 (2)
Zagłębie Sosnowiec	0 (4)
Radomiak Radom	3
Motor Lublin	1
Avia Świdnik	0
Górnik Zabrze	2
Stal Stocznia Szczecin	1
ŁKS Łódź	0
Polonia Warsaw	0
Ruch Chorzów	1

2nd Round
Piast Gliwice	2
Bałtyk Gdynia	1
Szombierki Bytom	0
Wisła Kraków	1
Górnik Wałbrzych	0
Legia Warsaw	2
Wisła Płock	0
Lech Poznań	1
Lechia Gdańsk	3
Śląsk Wrocław	0
Pogoń Szczecin	0
Zagłębie Sosnowiec	1
Radomiak Radom	1
Górnik Zabrze	4
Stal Stocznia Szczecin	2
Ruch Chorzów	3

Quarterfinals
Piast Gliwice	1
Wisła Kraków	0
Legia Warsaw	0
Lech Poznań	1
Lechia Gdańsk	1
Zagłębie Sosnowiec	0
Górnik Zabrze	0
Ruch Chorzów	1

Semifinals
Piast Gliwice	1
Lech Poznań	0
Lechia Gdańsk	0 (3)
Ruch Chorzów	0 (1)

Finals
Piast Gliwice	1
Lechia Gdańsk	2
