= 1996–97 PAOK FC season =

PAOK
1996–97 season
- President: Giorgos Kalyvas; Giorgos Batatoudis
- Manager: Gunder Bengtsson; Christos Archontidis; Angelos Anastasiadis
- Stadium: Toumba Stadium
- Alpha Ethniki: 4th
- Greek Cup: Round of 16
- Top goalscorer: League: All: Frantzeskos (16)
- Highest home attendance: 35,850 vs Olympiacos

The 1996–97 season was PAOK Football Club's 70th in existence and the club's 38th consecutive season in the top flight of Greek football. The team entered the Greek Football Cup in third round.

== Players ==
=== Squad ===
Note: Flags indicate national team as defined under FIFA eligibility rules; some limited exceptions apply. Players may hold more than one non-FIFA nationality.

No.	Pos.	Nation	Player
—	GK	GRE	Nikolaos Michopoulos
—	GK	GRE	Vangelis Pourliotopoulos
—	GK	GRE	Asterios Themelis
—	DF	GRE	Tasos Tasiopoulos
—	DF	GRE	Dimitrios Kapetanopoulos
—	DF	GRE	Panagiotis Katsouris
—	DF	GRE	Nikos Kolompourdas
—	DF	GRE	Panagiotis Sidiropoulos
—	DF	ROU	Ionel Pârvu
—	DF	RUS	Andrey Chernyshov
—	DF	GRE	Alexis Alexiou
—	DF	GRE	Makis Chavos
—	DF	GRE	Nikos Panagiotidis
—	DF	GRE	Giorgos Koumaropoulos
—	DF	AUS	Joe Palatsides
—	DF	GRE	Vangelis Nastos

No.	Pos.	Nation	Player
—	DF	GRE	Charalampos Nikolaou
—	DF	GRE	Panagiotis Karametaxas
—	MF	GRE	Theodoros Zagorakis (captain)
—	MF	GRE	Giorgos Toursounidis
—	MF	GRE	Achilleas Zafiriou
—	MF	GRE	Kostas Frantzeskos
—	MF	GRE	Spyros Marangos
—	MF	POL	Leszek Pisz
—	MF	GRE	Giorgos Hatzizisis
—	MF	GRE	Pantelis Kafes
—	FW	GRE	Zisis Vryzas
—	FW	GRE	Paraschos Zouboulis
—	FW	POL	Robert Dymkowski
—	FW	AUS	John Anastasiadis
—	FW	GRE	Antonis Gioukoudis
—	FW	GRE	Kostas Inebolidis

== Transfers ==
Players transferred in

Transfer Window	Pos.	Name	Club	Fee
Summer	DF	(Greece) Vangelis Nastos	(Greece) PAOK U20	
Summer	DF	(Greece) Panagiotis Karametaxas	(Greece) Apollon Chrysochoriou	?
Summer	DF	(Greece) Charalampos Nikolaou	(Greece) AEL	?
Summer	DF	(Greece) Tasos Tasiopoulos	(Greece) Athinaikos	?
Summer	DF	(Greece) Nikos Kolompourdas	(Germany) Köln II	Free
Summer	DF	(Greece) Panagiotis Katsouris	(Greece) Naoussa	?
Summer	DF	(Russia) Andrey Chernyshov	(Austria) Sturm Graz	?
Summer	MF	(Poland) Leszek Pisz	(Poland) Legia Warsaw	?
Summer	MF	(Greece) Giorgos Hatzizisis	(Greece) Eordaikos	?
Summer	FW	(Greece) Zisis Vryzas	(Greece) Xanthi	250 million Dr.
Summer	FW	(Poland) Robert Dymkowski	(Poland) Pogoń Szczecin	Loan
Winter	GK	(Greece) Asterios Themelis	(Greece) Anagennisi Kolindros	Loan Return
Winter	DF	(Australia) Joe Palatsides	(Greece) Apollon Kalamarias	?
Winter	DF	(Greece) Panagiotis Sidiropoulos	(Greece) Ionikos	?
Winter	DF	(Romania) Ionel Pârvu	(Romania) Steaua București	?
Winter	MF	(Greece) Kostas Frantzeskos	(Greece) OFI	100 million Dr.
Winter	MF	(Greece) Spyros Marangos	(Greece) Panathinaikos	?
Winter	MF	(Greece) Pantelis Kafes	(Greece) Pontioi Veria	?
Winter	FW	(Greece) Kostas Inebolidis	(Greece) Aetos Skydra	?

Players transferred out

Transfer Window	Pos.	Name	Club	Fee
Summer	GK	(Greece) Asterios Themelis	(Greece) Anagennisi Kolindros	Loan
Summer	DF	(Greece) Giannis Tsoraklidis	(Greece) Poseidon Michaniona	Loan
Summer	DF	(Greece) Giannis Voltezos	(Greece) Kastoria	Free
Summer	MF	(Greece) Giannis Antonas	(Greece) Panionios	Free
Summer	MF	(Greece) Giotis Tsalouchidis	(Greece) Veria	Free
Summer	MF	(Denmark) Jesper Johansen	(Belgium) K. Beerschot V.A.C.	Free
Summer	MF	(Netherlands) Maurice van Ham	(Belgium) Beveren	End of loan
Summer	MF	(Federal Republic of Yugoslavia) Goran Aleksić	(France) Créteil	Free
Summer	FW	(Federal Republic of Yugoslavia) Miroslav Jović	(Germany) Energie Cottbus	Free
Summer	FW	(Greece) Dimitris Nolis	(Greece) Kastoria	Free
Winter	DF	(Greece) Alexis Alexiou	(Greece) Apollon Kalamarias	Free
Winter	DF	(Greece) Makis Chavos	(Greece) Xanthi	Free
Winter	DF	(Russia) Andrey Chernyshov	(Germany) Greuther Fürth	Free
Winter	MF	(Poland) Leszek Pisz	(Greece) Kavala	Free

== Pre-season ==
Win Draw Loss

20 July 1996 Friendly	Thayngen	0–3	PAOK	Germany
			Vryzas

24 July 1996 Friendly	SpVgg Ludwigsburg	1–0	PAOK	Germany

26 July 1996 Friendly	Thayngen	0–2	PAOK	Germany

28 July 1996 Friendly	Kickers Offenbach	2–1	PAOK	Germany
			Tasiopoulos

30 July 1996 Friendly	SC Freiburg	0–0	PAOK	Germany

2 August 1996 Friendly	Ehingen	1–3	PAOK	Germany
	40'		Karametaxas 20'; Dymkowski; Tasiopoulos

5 August 1996 Friendly	PAOK	3–0	Leicester City	Thessaloniki
	Zouboulis 3', 65'; Vryzas 76'			Stadium: Toumba Stadium; Referee: Papadopoulos

6 August 1996 Friendly	Poseidon Michaniona	0–5	PAOK	Michaniona
			Kapetanopoulos 47', 52'; Hatzizisis 68', 72'; Gioukoudis 90'

8 August 1996 Friendly	PAOK	1–0	Xanthi	Thessaloniki
	Zouboulis 5'			Stadium: Toumba Stadium

11 August 1996 Friendly	PAOK	2–0	Southampton	Thessaloniki
	Pisz 55'; Kapetanopoulos 80'			Stadium: Toumba Stadium

14 August 1996 Friendly	Veria	1–2	PAOK	Veria
	Katsavos 20'		Troupkos 6' (o.g.); Dymkowski 30'	Stadium: Veria Stadium; Referee: Tevekelis

19 August 1996 Friendly	PAOK	2–0	Inter Bratislava	Thessaloniki
	Zouboulis 28'; Vryzas 77'			Stadium: Toumba Stadium

21 August 1996 Friendly	Edessaikos	2–3	PAOK	Edessa
	Kolev 38' (pen.); Georgopoulos 70'		Kapetanopoulos 6'; Gioukoudis 52'; Zouboulis 56'	Stadium: Municipal Stadium of Edessa; Referee: Aggelakis

26 August 1996 Friendly	AEK Athens	3–1	PAOK	Athens
	Toursounidis 56' (o.g.); Kostis 59'; Nikolaidis 67'		Vryzas 50'	Stadium: Nikos Goumas Stadium

28 August 1996 Friendly	Doxa Drama	2–0	PAOK	Drama
	Kiosses 24'; Tavlaridis 82'			Stadium: Doxa Drama Stadium; Referee: Mintiouris

2 September 1996 Friendly	Aris	0–0	PAOK	Thessaloniki
				Stadium: Kaftanzoglio Stadium; Referee: Zachariadis
Note: Game length was 45 minutes.

2 September 1996 Friendly	Iraklis	3–0	PAOK	Thessaloniki
	Jovanović 35' (pen.); Mirtsekis 40'; Lagonidis 44'			Stadium: Kaftanzoglio Stadium; Referee: Papachintzios
Note: Game length was 45 minutes.

== Competitions ==
=== Overview ===
Competition	Record							
Competition	Pld	W	D	L	GF	GA	GD	Win %
Alpha Ethniki	34	19	9	6	53	28	+25	55.88
Greek Cup	4	2	0	2	9	6	+3	50.00
Total	38	21	9	8	62	34	+28	55.26

Source: Competitions

=== Managerial statistics ===
Head coach	From	To	Record							
Head coach	From	To	G	W	D	L	GF	GA	GD	Win %
(Sweden) Gunder Bengtsson	Start of season	01.12.1996	13	5	4	4	15	15	+0	38.46
(Greece) Christos Archontidis	08.12.1996	02.02.1997	10	3	4	3	10	9	+1	30.00
(Greece) Angelos Anastasiadis	09.02.1997	End of season	15	13	1	1	37	10	+27	86.67

== Alpha Ethniki ==
=== Standings ===
Pos	Team	Pld	W	D	L	GF	GA	GD	Pts	Qualification or relegation
2	AEK Athens	34	22	6	6	75	28	+47	72	Qualification for Cup Winners' Cup first round
3	OFI	34	20	6	8	51	28	+23	66	Qualification for UEFA Cup second qualifying round
4	PAOK	34	19	9	6	53	28	+25	66	Qualification for UEFA Cup second qualifying round
5	Panathinaikos	34	20	4	10	60	25	+35	64	
6	Kavala	34	16	7	11	42	43	−1	55	

Source: RSSSF
Rules for classification: 1st points; 2nd head-to-head points; 3rd head-to-head goal difference; 4th decision match.

==== Results summary ====
Overall								Home						Away					
Pld	W	D	L	GF	GA	GD	Pts	W	D	L	GF	GA	GD	W	D	L	GF	GA	GD
34	19	9	6	53	28	+25	66	12	5	0	32	6	+26	7	4	6	21	22	−1

Last updated: 25 May 1997.
Source: Competitive matches

==== Results by round ====
Round	1	2	3	4	5	6	7	8	9	10	11	12	13	14	15	16	17	18	19	20	21	22	23	24	25	26	27	28	29	30	31	32	33	34
Ground	A	H	A	A	H	A	H	A	H	A	H	H	A	H	A	H	A	H	A	H	H	A	H	A	H	A	H	A	A	H	A	H	A	H
Result	L	W	D	D	W	L	D	D	W	L	D	D	L	D	D	W	W	W	L	W	W	W	W	W	W	L	W	W	W	D	W	W	W	W
Position	15	8	8	9	9	9	9	10	7	10	10	11	11	11	11	11	9	7	9	7	6	6	6	6	5	5	5	5	5	5	5	5	4	4

Source: League matches
A = Away; H = Home; W = Win; D = Draw; L = Loss

==== Matches ====
Win Draw Loss

8 September 1996 1	OFI	3–1	PAOK	Heraklion
	Anastasiou 24'; Frantzeskos 35' (penalty missed) 49'; Moutas 68'		Dymkowski 90'	Stadium: Theodoros Vardinogiannis Stadium; Referee: Begos

14 September 1996 2	PAOK	2–0	Iraklis	Thessaloniki
	Toursounidis 27' (pen.), 71' (pen.)			Stadium: Toumba Stadium; Attendance: 11,720; Referee: Papachintzios

29 September 1996 3	Kalamata	0–0	PAOK	Kalamata
				Stadium: Kalamata Municipal Stadium; Attendance: 4,722; Referee: Papadakos

14 October 1996 4	Apollon Athens	0–0	PAOK	Athens
				Stadium: Rizoupoli Stadium; Attendance: 1,470; Referee: Chatzis

20 October 1996 5	PAOK	1–0	Athinaikos	Thessaloniki
	Katsouris 58'		Gino (red card) 77'	Stadium: Toumba Stadium; Attendance: 8,776; Referee: Papatriantafyllou

27 October 1996 6	Panachaiki	2–0	PAOK	Patras
	Savvidis 8', 59'		Chernyshov (red card) 78'	Stadium: Kostas Davourlis Stadium

3 November 1996 7	PAOK	1–1	Edessaikos	Thessaloniki
	Vryzas 55'		Andreadis 34'	Stadium: Toumba Stadium; Attendance: 5,131; Referee: Velliodis

18 November 1996 8	Aris	0–0	PAOK	Thessaloniki
			Kapetanopoulos (red card) 17'	Stadium: Kleanthis Vikelidis Stadium; Attendance: 11,462; Referee: Vellios

24 November 1996 9	PAOK	2–0	Ionikos	Thessaloniki
	Toursounidis 43' (pen.); Vryzas 45'			Stadium: Toumba Stadium; Attendance: 3,560; Referee: Varouchas

1 December 1996 10	Panathinaikos	5–0	PAOK	Athens
	Warzycha 7', 62', 65'; Goumas 37'; Nasiopoulos 70'			Stadium: Athens Olympic Stadium; Attendance: 4,873

8 December 1996 11	PAOK	0–0	Veria	Thessaloniki
				Stadium: Toumba Stadium; Attendance: 4,112

15 December 1996 12	PAOK	1–1	Paniliakos	Thessaloniki
	Toursounidis 82' (pen.); Panagiotidis (red card) 90'		Strantzalis 40'; Papadopoulos (red card) 68'; Barnjak (red card) 90'	Stadium: Toumba Stadium; Attendance: 4,316; Referee: Kaznaferis

22 December 1996 13	Olympiacos	1–0	PAOK	Piraeus
	Karapialis 55'			Stadium: Karaiskakis Stadium; Attendance: 14,694; Referee: Chatzis

5 January 1997 14	PAOK	0–0	AEK Athens	Thessaloniki
				Stadium: Toumba Stadium; Attendance: 24,056; Referee: Borovilos

11 January 1997 15	Xanthi	1–1	PAOK	Xanthi
	Teggelidis 11' (red card) 45'; Samaras (red card) 88'		Frantzeskos (penalty missed) 53' 71'; Hatzizisis (red card) 83'	Stadium: Xanthi Ground; Attendance: 3,475; Referee: Fasolis

15 January 1997 16	PAOK	3–0	Kavala	Thessaloniki
	Vryzas 16'; Frantzeskos 29'; Zouboulis 50'			Stadium: Toumba Stadium; Attendance: 6,412; Referee: Giannadakis

19 January 1997 17	Kastoria	1–2	PAOK	Kastoria
	Duda 80'		Frantzeskos 50', 54'	Stadium: Municipal Stadium of Kastoria; Attendance: 5,114; Referee: Varouchas

26 January 1997 18	PAOK	2–1	OFI	Thessaloniki
	Frantzeskos 30', 72'		Marinakis 89'	Stadium: Toumba Stadium; Referee: Varouchas

2 February 1997 19	Iraklis	2–0	PAOK	Thessaloniki
	Kofidis 7'; Gonias 67' (pen.)			Stadium: Kaftanzoglio Stadium; Attendance: 14,460; Referee: Vellios

9 February 1997 20	PAOK	2–0	Kalamata	Thessaloniki
	Toursounidis 48' (pen.); Pârvu 51'			Stadium: Toumba Stadium; Attendance: 10,474; Referee: Psychomanis

16 February 1997 21	PAOK	3–1	Apollon Athens	Thessaloniki
	Frantzeskos 7'; Tasiopoulos 72'; Inebolidis 83'		Damigos 87'	Stadium: Toumba Stadium; Attendance: 4,381; Referee: Mintiouris

24 February 1997 22	Athinaikos	2–3	PAOK	Athens
	Sabbadini 16'; Velis 27'		Frantzeskos 45'; Sidiropoulos 56'; Vryzas 57'	Stadium: Vyronas National Stadium; Referee: Kalathenos

2 March 1997 23	PAOK	2–0	Panachaiki	Thessaloniki
	Marangos 45', 84'			Stadium: Toumba Stadium; Attendance: 10,576

9 March 1997 24	Edessaikos	1–4	PAOK	Edessa
	Samolis (red card) 27'; Kryos 79'		Frantzeskos 24'; Marangos 32'; Zagorakis 63'; Kolompourdas 88'	Stadium: Municipal Stadium of Edessa; Attendance: 7,155; Referee: Douros

16 March 1997 25	PAOK	2–1	Aris	Thessaloniki
	Vryzas 70', 75'		Mavrogenidis 82'	Stadium: Toumba Stadium; Attendance: 28,038; Referee: Kaznaferis

22 March 1997 26	Ionikos	2–1	PAOK	Piraeus
	Filis 28'; Brewster 55'		Dymkowski 63'	Stadium: Neapoli Stadium; Attendance: 2,021

26 March 1997 27	PAOK	1–0	Panathinaikos	Thessaloniki
	Frantzeskos 87'			Stadium: Toumba Stadium; Attendance: 13,110

6 April 1997 28	Veria	1–2	PAOK	Veria
	Troupkos 45'		Tasiopoulos 44'; Kapetanopoulos 72'	Stadium: Veria Stadium; Attendance: 5,844

13 April 1997 29	Paniliakos	0–2	PAOK	Pyrgos
			Marangos 12'; Gitsis 28' (o.g.)	Stadium: Pyrgos Stadium; Referee: Chatzistavridis

20 April 1997 30	PAOK	0–0	Olympiacos	Thessaloniki
	Sidiropoulos (red card) 56'		Dabizas (red card) 90'	Stadium: Toumba Stadium; Attendance: 35,850; Referee: Kalathenos

4 May 1997 31	AEK Athens	1–2	PAOK	Athens
	Kostis 90'		Zouboulis 23'; Vryzas 59'	Stadium: Nikos Goumas Stadium; Attendance: 11,250; Referee: Douros

11 May 1997 32	PAOK	4–1	Xanthi	Thessaloniki
	Zouboulis 12', 88'; Frantzeskos 63', 80'		Sebwe 89'	Stadium: Toumba Stadium; Attendance: 13,143

18 May 1997 33	Kavala	0–3	PAOK	Kavala
			Toursounidis 48' (pen.); Frantzeskos 62'; Zouboulis 75'	Stadium: Kavala Stadium; Attendance: 7,527; Referee: Bikas

25 May 1997 34	PAOK	6–0	Kastoria	Thessaloniki
	Frantzeskos 12', 36', 54'; Vryzas 19', 28'; Zagorakis 86'		Nolis (penalty missed) 70'	Stadium: Toumba Stadium; Attendance: 24,129; Referee: Papapetrou

== Greek Cup ==
=== Third round ===
2 October 1996 1st leg	PAOK	4–0	Panionios	Thessaloniki
19:00 EET	Alexiou 29'; Toursounidis 34' (pen.); Pisz 40'; Katsouris 79'			Stadium: Toumba Stadium; Referee: Vellios

14 November 1996 2nd leg	Panionios	2–3 (2–7 agg.)	PAOK	Athens
14:30 EET	Sapountzis 84'; Mantzios 85'		Zouboulis 19', 65'; Dymkowski 43'	Stadium: Nea Smyrni Stadium

=== Round of 16 ===
27 November 1996 1st leg	PAOK	1–2	Olympiacos	Thessaloniki
19:30 EET	Zouboulis 19'; Vryzas (yellow card) 23' (yellow-red card) 28'		Alexandris 52'; Đorđević 73' (pen.)	Stadium: Toumba Stadium; Attendance: 20,498; Referee: Georgios Psychomanis (Athens)

11 December 1996 2nd leg	Olympiacos	2–1 (4–2 agg.)	PAOK	Piraeus
18:15 EET	Alexandris 40', 59'		Tasiopoulos 41'	Stadium: Karaiskakis Stadium; Attendance: 4,503; Referee: Sotiris Vorgias (Athens)

== Statistics ==
=== Squad statistics ===
As of May 25, 1997

Appearances denote players in the starting lineup, with the numbers in parentheses denoting appearances as substitute.

No.	Name	Alpha Ethniki		Greek Cup		Total	
No.	Name	Apps	Goals	Apps	Goals	Apps	Goals
Goalkeepers
	(Greece) Nikolaos Michopoulos	34	0	4	0	38	0
	(Greece) Vangelis Pourliotopoulos	0	0	0	0	0	0
Defenders
	(Greece) Tasos Tasiopoulos	31	2	4	1	35	3
	(Greece) Dimitrios Kapetanopoulos	29	1	4	0	33	1
	(Greece) Panagiotis Katsouris	21	1	3	1	24	2
	(Greece) Panagiotis Sidiropoulos	18	1	0	0	18	1
	(Romania) Ionel Pârvu	18	1	0	0	18	1
	(Greece) Nikos Kolompourdas	17	1	0	0	17	1
	(Greece) Alexis Alexiou	11	0	2	1	13	1
	(Russia) Andrey Chernyshov	7	0	3	0	10	0
	(Greece) Makis Chavos	7	0	2	0	9	0
	(Greece) Nikos Panagiotidis	7	0	1	0	8	0
	(Greece) Giorgos Koumaropoulos	5	0	2	0	7	0
	(Australia) Joe Palatsides	4	0	0	0	4	0
	(Greece) Charalampos Nikolaou	2	0	1	0	3	0
	(Greece) Vangelis Nastos	1	0	0	0	1	0
	(Greece) Panagiotis Karametaxas	1	0	0	0	1	0
Midfielders
	(Greece) Theodoros Zagorakis	32	2	3	0	35	2
	(Greece) Giorgos Toursounidis	31	6	3	1	34	7
	(Greece) Achilleas Zafiriou	25	0	3	0	28	0
	(Greece) Kostas Frantzeskos	20	16	0	0	20	16
	(Greece) Spyros Marangos	20	4	0	0	20	4
	(Greece) Giorgos Hatzizisis	16	0	2	0	18	0
	(Poland) Leszek Pisz	11	0	4	1	15	1
	(Greece) Pantelis Kafes	3	0	0	0	3	0
Forwards
	(Greece) Zisis Vryzas	31	9	2	0	33	9
	(Greece) Paraschos Zouboulis	25	5	2	3	27	8
	(Poland) Robert Dymkowski	16	2	4	1	20	3
	(Australia) John Anastasiadis	9	0	3	0	12	0
	(Greece) Antonis Gioukoudis	8	0	2	0	10	0
	(Greece) Kostas Inebolidis	6	1	0	0	6	1

Source: Match reports in competitive matches, RSSSF

=== Goalscorers ===
Rank	No.	Pos.	Player	Alpha Ethniki	Greek Cup	Total
1		MF	(Greece) Kostas Frantzeskos	16	0	16
2		FW	(Greece) Zisis Vryzas	9	0	9
3		FW	(Greece) Paraschos Zouboulis	5	3	8
4		MF	(Greece) Giorgos Toursounidis	6	1	7
5		MF	(Greece) Spyros Marangos	4	0	4
6		DF	(Greece) Tasos Tasiopoulos	2	1	3
6		FW	(Poland) Robert Dymkowski	2	1	3
8		MF	(Greece) Theodoros Zagorakis	2	0	2
8		DF	(Greece) Panagiotis Katsouris	1	1	2
10		DF	(Greece) Dimitrios Kapetanopoulos	1	0	1
10		DF	(Greece) Panagiotis Sidiropoulos	1	0	1
10		DF	(Greece) Nikos Kolompourdas	1	0	1
10		DF	(Romania) Ionel Pârvu	1	0	1
10		FW	(Greece) Kostas Inebolidis	1	0	1
10		DF	(Greece) Alexis Alexiou	0	1	1
10		MF	(Poland) Leszek Pisz	0	1	1
Own goals				1	0	1
TOTALS				53	9	62

Source: Match reports in competitive matches, RSSSF
