= Roman Józefowicz =

Polish footballer

Personal information
- Full name: Roman Józefowicz
- Date of birth: 29 March 1958 (age 68)
- Place of birth: Gdańsk, Poland
- Height: 1.79 m (5 ft 10 in)
- Position: Forward

Youth career
- 1968–1972: Lechia Gdańsk
- 1972–1975: Ogniwo Sopot

Senior career*
| Years | Team | Apps | (Gls) |
| 1975–1976 | Ogniwo Sopot | | |
| 1977–1979 | Gedania Gdańsk | | |
| 1979–1981 | Lechia Gdańsk | 11 | (0) |
| 1981–1982 | Wisła Tczew | | |
| 1982–1984 | Lechia Gdańsk | 37 | (4) |
- * Club domestic league appearances and goals

Roman Józefowicz (born 29 March 1958) is a Polish former footballer who played as a forward.

== Biography ==
During his early years Józefowicz played with his local club Lechia Gdańsk. However, after being declared as too short, he was released from the Lechia academy and joined Ogniwo Sopot instead. It was with Ogniwo that he made his league debut, spending the 1975–76 season with the club, before returning to Gdańsk to play with Gedania Gdańsk. After two seasons with Gedania, Józefowicz returned to Lechia, now being 10 cm taller than when he left, and having league football experience. Upon his return Józefowicz found it hard to break into the team, making only 11 appearances in his first two seasons. In 1981 he joined Wisła Tczew for a season, returning to Lechia the following season with the club having been relegated to the third tier.

Despite Lechia being in the third tier of Polish football, it was this period that provided Lechia with some of its greatest footballing moments in the earlier years of their history. Józefowicz made 15 appearances and scored 3 goals as Lechia convincingly won the III liga. That same season Józefowicz played in every game of Lechia's 1982–83 Polish Cup run. Lechia progressed to the final, where Józefowicz replaced an injured Zbigniew Kowalski on the 40th minute. Lechia beat Piast Gliwice 2–1 in the final, winning the clubs first piece of silverware in their history. After their promotion Lechia were again playing in the II liga. By now Józefowicz had earned himself a starting position and played in 21 games as Lechia once again secured promotion, again winning the league. That season also saw Lechia playing in Europe for the first time, being drawn against European footballing giants Juventus in the UEFA Cup Winners' Cup due to the previous season's cup win. Józefowicz played in the home leg, coming on as a late substitute and playing four minutes in the historical game. After their promotion Lechia were playing in Polands top division for the first time in over 20 years. Józefowicz's final league appearance of his career came in the I liga playing against Bałtyk Gdynia. Midway through the season Józefowicz was released by Lechia, with the player deciding to retire.

After his retirement he became a team manager at Lechia (not to be confused as the teams manager/head coach) where he dealt with the issues of the players. Such incidents were those where players were involved with the police, with Józefowicz being tasked at trying to get the players off without incident, or trying to lessen the players' punishment. A notable incident was when Maciej Kamiński hit a policeman, Józefowicz knew the player would be punished, but was tasked with trying to lessen the sentence. He unsuccessfully tried to bribe the police with a TV set, with Kamiński eventually getting six months in prison.

After his time as the team manager, Józefowicz held further roles within the club, including those in youth coaching. In 2021, he became a coach at UKS Feyenoord Gdańsk.

== Honours ==
Lechia Gdańsk

- Polish Cup: 1982–83
- II liga West: 1983–84
- III liga, group II: 1982–83
