= 1990–91 I liga =

Polish football season

I liga
- Season: 1990–91
- Dates: July 1990 – June 1991
- Champions: Stal Stalowa Wola (1st title)
- Promoted: Stal Stalowa Wola; Widzew Łódź
- Relegated: Hutnik Warsaw; Ostrovia Ostrów Wlkp.
- Matches: 380
- Goals: 846 (2.23 per match)
- Top goalscorer: Robert Dymkowski (21 goals)
- Biggest home win: Odra 6–0 Ostrovia
- Biggest away win: Ostrovia 0–4 Miedź
- Highest scoring: Ostrovia 3–5 Górnik
- Highest attendance: 10,000
- Total attendance: 932,520
- Average attendance: 2,454 ▼8.1%

The 1990–91 I liga (then known as the 1990–91 II liga) was the 43rd season of the I liga, the second highest division in the Polish football league system since its establishment in 1949.

The league was operated by the Polish Football Association (PZPN). 20 teams took part in them, playing in a circular system. The league season began in July 1990, the last matches were played in June 1991. It was the last edition of the I liga before the competition reform, after which two groups of this level were restored.

Stal Stalowa Wola won the championship for the first time in their history.

== Participating teams ==
The order of the teams according to the place taken at the end of the season.

- Stal Stalowa Wola – I liga champion, promoted to Ekstraklasa
- Widzew Łódź – I liga runner-up, promoted to Ekstraklasa
- Jagiellonia Białystok – promoted to Ekstraklasa play-offs
- Miedź Legnica
- Stilon Gorzów Wielkopolski
- Raków Częstochowa
- Polonia Bytom
- Siarka Tarnobrzeg
- Szombierki Bytom
- Górnik Wałbrzych
- Pogoń Szczecin
- Lechia Gdańsk
- Resovia
- Odra Wodzisław Śląski
- Stal Rzeszów
- Zagłębie Wałbrzych
- Korona Kielce
- Gwardia Warsaw
- Hutnik Warsaw – relegated to II liga
- Ostrovia Ostrów Wielkopolski – relegated to II liga

== Top goalscorers ==
| Rank | Player | Club | Goals |
|---|---|---|---|
| 1 | (Poland) Robert Dymkowski | Pogoń Szczecin | 21 |
| 2 | (Poland) Zenon Burzawa | Stilon Gorzów Wielkopolski | 19 |
| 2 | (Poland) Bogusław Cygan | Polonia Bytom | 19 |
