= 1993–94 Ekstraklasa =

67th season of top-tier football league in Poland

Liga
- Season: 1993–94
- Champions: Legia Warsaw (5th title)
- Relegated: Wisła Kraków; Siarka Tarnobrzeg; Polonia Warsaw; Zawisza Bydgoszcz
- Matches: 305
- Goals: 713 (2.34 per match)
- Top goalscorer: Zenon Burzawa (21 goals)
- Average attendance: 4,236 ▲13.8%

Statistics of the Ekstraklasa for the 1993–94 season.

== Overview ==
18 teams competed in the league. The title was won by Legia Warsaw.

== League table ==
| Pos | Team | Pld | W | D | L | GF | GA | GD | Pts | Qualification or relegation |
|---|---|---|---|---|---|---|---|---|---|---|
| 1 | Legia Warsaw (Note: Legia Warsaw, ŁKS Łódź and Wisła Kraków had a 3 pts penalty at the start of the league.) (C) | 34 | 19 | 13 | 2 | 72 | 24 | +48 | 48 | Qualification to Champions League qualifying round |
| 2 | GKS Katowice | 34 | 17 | 13 | 4 | 52 | 28 | +24 | 47 | Qualification to UEFA Cup preliminary round |
| 3 | Górnik Zabrze | 34 | 17 | 12 | 5 | 56 | 32 | +24 | 46 | Qualification to UEFA Cup preliminary round |
| 4 | ŁKS Łódź | 34 | 17 | 11 | 6 | 49 | 24 | +25 | 42 | Qualification to Cup Winners' Cup qualifying round |
| 5 | Pogoń Szczecin | 34 | 11 | 19 | 4 | 39 | 24 | +15 | 41 | |
| 6 | Widzew Łódź | 34 | 12 | 15 | 7 | 43 | 34 | +9 | 39 | |
| 7 | Ruch Chorzów | 34 | 14 | 9 | 11 | 48 | 41 | +7 | 37 | |
| 8 | Hutnik Kraków | 34 | 12 | 13 | 9 | 34 | 28 | +6 | 37 | |
| 9 | Lech Poznań | 34 | 12 | 11 | 11 | 39 | 32 | +7 | 35 | |
| 10 | Miliarder Pniewy | 34 | 11 | 11 | 12 | 41 | 40 | +1 | 33 | |
| 11 | Stal Mielec | 34 | 11 | 9 | 14 | 32 | 45 | −13 | 31 | |
| 12 | Stal Stalowa Wola | 34 | 8 | 14 | 12 | 40 | 47 | −7 | 30 | |
| 13 | Zagłębie Lubin | 34 | 9 | 12 | 13 | 25 | 37 | −12 | 30 | |
| 14 | Warta Poznań | 34 | 11 | 8 | 15 | 32 | 45 | −13 | 30 | |
| 15 | Wisła Kraków (R) | 34 | 6 | 13 | 15 | 30 | 46 | −16 | 22 | Relegated to II liga |
| 16 | Siarka Tarnobrzeg (R) | 34 | 5 | 9 | 20 | 28 | 61 | −33 | 19 | Relegated to II liga |
| 17 | Polonia Warsaw (R) | 34 | 4 | 11 | 19 | 25 | 57 | −32 | 19 | Relegated to II liga |
| 18 | Zawisza Bydgoszcz (R) | 34 | 4 | 9 | 21 | 30 | 70 | −40 | 17 | Relegated to II liga |

Source: 90minut.pl (in Polish)
(C) Champions; (R) Relegated

== Results ==
| Home \ Away | KAT | GÓR | HUT | LPO | LEG | ŁKS | MIL | POG | PWA | RUC | SIA | STA | SSW | WAR | WID | WIS | ZLU | ZAW |
|---|---|---|---|---|---|---|---|---|---|---|---|---|---|---|---|---|---|---|
| GKS Katowice | | 1–1 | 3–0 | 2–1 | 1–1 | 1–2 | 3–0 | 1–1 | 3–1 | 1–0 | 0–1 | 2–0 | 2–2 | 3–0 | 1–1 | 1–0 | 1–0 | 3–0 |
| Górnik Zabrze | 4–2 | | 1–2 | 1–0 | 2–1 | 1–2 | 1–1 | 3–2 | 2–1 | 0–0 | 2–1 | 5–0 | 2–0 | 2–1 | 2–0 | 1–0 | 1–1 | 5–0 |
| Hutnik Kraków | 3–1 | 0–0 | | 2–0 | 0–0 | 0–0 | 1–0 | 1–1 | 1–0 | 1–1 | 3–0 | 0–0 | 2–0 | 0–2 | 0–1 | 1–0 | 2–1 | 0–1 |
| Lech Poznań | 1–1 | 0–0 | 0–2 | | 2–1 | 0–1 | 2–0 | 1–1 | 1–1 | 1–1 | 2–1 | 0–1 | 1–0 | 1–0 | 3–1 | 3–1 | 4–0 | 3–2 |
| Legia Warsaw | 0–0 | 1–1 | 5–0 | 2–0 | | 0–0 | 5–0 | 0–0 | 2–1 | 2–0 | 6–3 | 3–0 | 5–1 | 3–2 | 2–0 | 1–1 | 2–2 | 5–0 |
| ŁKS Łódź | 1–2 | 2–2 | 0–0 | 1–0 | 0–1 | | 1–0 | 2–0 | 1–1 | 5–0 | 1–0 | 5–0 | 3–0 | 4–1 | 0–0 | 1–1 | 2–0 | 2–0 |
| Miliarder Pniewy | 2–2 | 1–0 | 2–1 | 0–0 | 1–2 | 0–0 | | 0–0 | 5–0 | 2–2 | 1–1 | 0–1 | 0–0 | 2–0 | 0–1 | 5–0 | 1–0 | 2–1 |
| Pogoń Szczecin | 1–1 | 1–2 | 1–1 | 0–0 | 0–0 | 2–0 | 2–1 | | 2–0 | 2–1 | 0–0 | 1–1 | 3–0 | 2–0 | 1–0 | 3–1 | 2–2 | 3–0 |
| Polonia Warsaw | 1–1 | 2–2 | 0–0 | 1–0 | 1–2 | 0–2 | 1–1 | 0–1 | | 0–3 | 2–1 | 1–1 | 3–2 | 1–2 | 0–3 | 1–2 | 0–1 | 1–1 |
| Ruch Chorzów | 0–1 | 3–1 | 0–0 | 3–2 | 0–2 | 4–1 | 3–2 | 1–1 | 5–0 | | 2–0 | 3–0 | 1–0 | 1–1 | 0–2 | 1–0 | 2–2 | 3–2 |
| Siarka Tarnobrzeg | 1–1 | 0–3 | 0–4 | 0–3 | 1–4 | 3–1 | 2–3 | 0–2 | 0–2 | 0–1 | | 3–1 | 1–0 | 2–1 | 2–2 | 1–2 | 0–2 | 0–0 |
| Stal Mielec | 1–2 | 0–1 | 1–0 | 1–0 | 1–3 | 0–0 | 0–3 | 0–0 | 3–0 | 0–1 | 3–0 | | 2–0 | 1–1 | 0–0 | 4–0 | 1–0 | 1–0 |
| Stal Stalowa Wola | 0–1 | 1–1 | 0–0 | 1–1 | 1–1 | 0–0 | 2–0 | 2–2 | 2–2 | 3–1 | 0–0 | 1–0 | | 0–0 | 1–2 | 0–0 | 0–0 | 1–0 |
| Warta Poznań | 0–2 | 1–3 | 1–1 | 1–1 | 0–0 | 2–0 | 0–1 | 1–0 | 2–0 | 2–0 | 1–0 | 1–2 | 0–1 | | 1–1 | 1–0 | 2–1 | 2–1 |
| Widzew Łódź | 0–0 | 2–0 | 3–0 (Note: The match between Widzew and Hutnik (originally finished 1–1) verified to wo. An ineligible player fielded by Hutnik (Jerzy Wojnecki).) | 0–0 | 1–1 | 0–1 | 2–2 | 0–0 | 2–2 | 1–1 | 2–1 | 3–3 | 0–0 | 2–0 | | 3–2 | 1–1 | 2–3 |
| Wisła Kraków | 1–1 | 1–1 | 1–2 | 0–1 | 1–1 | 1–2 | 1–1 | 1–1 | 2–0 | 0–2 | 0–0 | 2–0 | 1–2 | 2–2 | 1–0 | | 1–1 | 2–0 |
| Zagłębie Lubin | 1–2 | 2–2 | 3–2 | 2–2 | 1–2 | 2–6 | 0–1 | 0–0 | 1–0 | 1–0 | 0–0 | 2–1 | 0–1 | 5–0 | 1–3 | 0–0 | | 3–2 |
| Zawisza Bydgoszcz | 0–3 | 0–1 | 1–1 | 1–3 | 0–6 | 0–0 | 3–1 | 1–1 | 2–2 | 3–2 | 0–0 | 2–2 | 0–1 | 0–1 | 1–4 | 2–2 | 1–2 | |

Source: 90minut.pl (in Polish)
Legend: Blue = home team win; Yellow = draw; Red = away team win.

== Top goalscorers ==
| Rank | Player | Club | Goals |
|---|---|---|---|
| 1 | (Poland) Zenon Burzawa | Miliarder Pniewy | 21 |
| 2 | (Poland) Jerzy Podbrożny | Legia Warsaw / Lech Poznań | 14 |
| 2 | (Poland) Marian Janoszka | GKS Katowice | 14 |
| 4 | (Poland) Miroslaw Waligora | Hutnik Kraków | 13 |
| 4 | (Poland) Wojciech Kowalczyk | Legia Warsaw | 13 |
| 6 | (Poland) Jacek Dembiński | Lech Poznań | 12 |
| 7 | (Poland) Piotr Prabucki | Warta Poznań | 11 |
| 8 | (Poland) Roman Dąbrowski | Ruch Chorzów | 10 |
| 8 | (Poland) Dariusz Podolski | ŁKS Łódź | 10 |
| 8 | (Poland) Piotr Mandrysz | Pogon Szczecin | 10 |
| 8 | (Poland) Robert Dymkowski | Pogon Szczecin | 10 |
| 8 | (Poland) Mariusz Śrutwa | Ruch Chorzów | 10 |

== Attendances ==
| No. | Club | Average | Highest |
|---|---|---|---|
| 1 | Legia Warszawa | 10,441 | 21,000 |
| 2 | Pogoń Szczecin | 9,529 | 18,000 |
| 3 | Górnik Zabrze | 5,623 | 17,259 |
| 4 | Stal Stalowa Wola | 5,085 | 9,000 |
| 5 | ŁKS | 4,882 | 12,801 |
| 6 | Lech Poznań | 4,324 | 16,000 |
| 7 | Ruch Chorzów | 4,106 | 10,000 |
| 8 | Siarka Tarnobrzeg | 3,882 | 8,000 |
| 9 | Polonia Warszawa | 3,594 | 10,000 |
| 10 | Widzew Łódź | 3,492 | 9,393 |
| 11 | Stal Mielec | 3,302 | 5,500 |
| 12 | Wisła Kraków | 2,959 | 8,000 |
| 13 | GKS Katowice | 2,941 | 8,000 |
| 14 | Warta Poznań | 2,912 | 7,000 |
| 15 | Zawisza Bydgoszcz | 2,640 | 4,679 |
| 16 | Hutnik Kraków | 2,524 | 10,000 |
| 17 | Miliarder Pniewy | 2,206 | 5,000 |
| 18 | Zagłębie Lubin | 1,815 | 3,500 |
