= 1984–85 Ekstraklasa =

59th season of top-tier football league in Poland

Liga
- Season: 1984–85
- Champions: Górnik Zabrze (11th title)
- Relegated: Radomiak Radom; Wisła Kraków
- Matches: 240
- Goals: 485 (2.02 per match)
- Top goalscorer: Leszek Iwanicki (14 goals)
- Average attendance: 12,358 ▲2.4%

Statistics of Ekstraklasa for the 1984–85 season.

== Overview ==
The league was contested by 16 teams, and Górnik Zabrze won the championship.

== League table ==
Pos	Team	Pld	W	D	L	GF	GA	GD	Pts	Qualification or relegation
1	Górnik Zabrze (C)	30	16	10	4	38	16	+22	42	Qualification to European Cup first round
2	Legia Warsaw	30	17	7	6	36	19	+17	41	Qualification to UEFA Cup first round
3	Widzew Łódź	30	13	12	5	34	16	+18	38	Qualification to Cup Winners' Cup first round
4	Lech Poznań	30	14	10	6	41	31	+10	38	Qualification to UEFA Cup first round
5	Zagłębie Sosnowiec	30	11	9	10	37	38	−1	31	
6	ŁKS Łódź	30	11	8	11	31	32	−1	30	
7	Ruch Chorzów	30	10	9	11	28	28	0	29	
8	Górnik Wałbrzych	30	8	13	9	32	35	−3	29	
9	Motor Lublin	30	9	9	12	30	36	−6	27	
10	GKS Katowice	30	7	12	11	22	28	−6	26	
11	Pogoń Szczecin	30	9	8	13	29	36	−7	26	
12	Lechia Gdańsk	30	8	10	12	23	34	−11	26	
13	Bałtyk Gdynia	30	9	8	13	22	35	−13	26	
14	Śląsk Wrocław	30	8	9	13	34	36	−2	25	
15	Radomiak Radom (R)	30	8	9	13	29	32	−3	25	Relegated to II liga
16	Wisła Kraków (R)	30	7	7	16	19	33	−14	21	Relegated to II liga

Source: 90minut.pl (in Polish)
(C) Champions; (R) Relegated

== Results ==
Home \ Away	BGD	KAT	GWŁ	GÓR	LPO	LGD	LEG	ŁKS	MOL	POG	RAD	RUC	ŚLĄ	WID	WIS	ZSO
Bałtyk Gdynia		1–0	2–2	1–0	0–1	1–0	0–0	0–1	2–0	0–2	0–0	2–1	1–0	1–0	2–0	1–1
GKS Katowice	1–0		1–1	0–0	1–1	2–0	0–0	1–0	2–2	2–0	1–0	1–1	1–1	1–0	1–0	0–2
Górnik Wałbrzych	4–0	1–0		0–0	0–0	0–0	1–0	1–1	1–2	2–1	1–1	2–1	2–1	1–2	1–1	1–2
Górnik Zabrze	1–0	2–1	1–0		5–0	3–1	3–1	2–0	2–0	1–0	2–0	1–0	2–2	2–0	1–0	0–0
Lech Poznań	2–0	0–0	1–2	1–0		1–1	1–0	1–2	3–0	2–2	2–0	0–0	1–0	0–4	2–0	6–0
Lechia Gdańsk	2–1	0–0	1–1	2–1	2–0		0–2	0–0	2–1	0–1	2–1	2–1	3–2	0–0	2–0	1–3
Legia Warsaw	1–0	1–0	4–2	0–0	1–2	1–0		3–0	2–1	2–0	2–0	2–0	2–0	0–0	0–2	1–0
ŁKS Łódź	3–0	0–0	2–0	1–1	7–5	1–0	1–2		1–0	0–0	0–1	0–0	1–0	0–1	0–0	3–0
Motor Lublin	0–0	3–1	1–1	0–0	1–1	0–0	0–1	1–1		2–0	2–1	1–0	4–2	1–1	0–0	1–0
Pogoń Szczecin	2–0	1–0	0–1	1–1	1–2	0–0	1–1	3–0	0–2		2–0	1–0	1–4	0–2	0–1	3–3
Radomiak Radom	3–0	2–0	5–1	1–1	1–1	0–0	1–1	0–2	3–0	0–0		1–2	0–0	1–0	1–0	1–1
Ruch Chorzów	1–1	2–0	1–1	2–0	0–0	1–0	2–4	2–0	1–0	4–0	2–1		0–0	0–0	1–0	2–2
Śląsk Wrocław	2–0	2–1	0–0	0–1	1–2	2–0	0–1	1–3	3–2	2–2	2–0	3–0		1–1	2–1	1–1
Widzew Łódź	1–1	1–1	2–1	1–2	0–0	0–0	2–0	4–1	2–0	1–0	3–1	1–0	0–0		1–1	2–0
Wisła Kraków	2–3	2–2	2–1	0–2	0–2	4–0	0–0	1–0	0–3	0–2	0–2	0–1	1–0	0–0		1–0
Zagłębie Sosnowiec	2–2	2–1	0–0	1–1	0–1	4–2	0–1	2–0	3–0	1–3	2–1	2–0	2–0	0–2	1–0	

Source: 90minut.pl (in Polish)
Legend: Blue = home team win; Yellow = draw; Red = away team win.

== Top goalscorers ==
Rank	Player	Club	Goals
1	(Poland) Leszek Iwanicki	Motor Lublin	14
2	(Poland) Mirosław Okoński	Lech Poznań	11
2	(Poland) Jan Urban	Zagłębie Sosnowiec	11
4	(Poland) Dariusz Dziekanowski	Widzew Łódź	10
5	(Poland) Aleksander Socha	Śląsk Wrocław	9
5	(Poland) Krzystof Baran	ŁKS Łódź	9
7	(Poland) Włodzimierz Smolarek	Widzew Łódź	8
7	(Poland) Jerzy Kruszczyński	Lechia Gdańsk	8
7	(Poland) Marek Leśniak	Pogoń Szczecin	8
7	(Poland) Ryszard Tarasiewicz	Śląsk Wrocław	8
7	(Poland) Ryszard Robakiewicz	ŁKS Łódź	8
7	(Poland) Mirosław Sajewicz	Radomiak Radom	8

== Attendances ==
#	Football club	Average
1	Lechia Gdańsk	25,400
2	Lech Poznań	19,533
3	Górnik Zabrze	16,267
4	Legia Warszawa	13,733
5	Widzew Łódź	13,600
6	Górnik Wałbrzych	13,533
7	Radomiak Radom	13,133
8	Motor Lublin	12,667
9	Zagłębie Sosnowiec	11,667
10	Pogoń Szczecin	11,600
11	Śląsk Wrocław	10,800
12	Ruch Chorzów	9,400
13	ŁKS	8,067
14	Wisła Kraków	6,487
15	GKS Katowice	6,400
16	Bałtyk Gdynia	5,433
