= Andrzej Marchel =

Polish footballer (1964–2025)

Personal information
- Date of birth: 16 March 1964
- Place of birth: Wejherowo, Poland
- Date of death: 6 February 2025 (aged 60)
- Height: 1.75 m (5 ft 9 in)
- Position: Defender

Youth career
- –1980: Gryf Wejherowo

Senior career*
Years	Team	Apps	(Gls)
1981–1985	Lechia Gdańsk	68	(4)
1985–1987	Olimpia Poznań	5	(0)
1987–1992	Lechia Gdańsk	150	(6)
Total		229	(10)
- * Club domestic league appearances and goals

Andrzej Marchel (16 March 1964 – 6 February 2025) was a Polish professional footballer who played as a defender. Marchel spent the majority of his career playing for Lechia Gdańsk, with the exception of two seasons at Olimpia Poznań.

== Career ==
Marchel broke into the Lechia Gdańsk first team in 1981, making his debut against Gwardia Koszalin at the age of 17. While in his first two seasons Lechia were not successful, even being relegated to the third tier at the end of his second season, Marchel was involved in one of the most important times in Lechia's history. While still a teenager, Marchel won the III liga for the 1982–83 season, he played in every game during the cup run which won the Polish Cup in 1983, beating Piast Gliwice in the final, played in the Polish Super Cup win over Lech Poznań in 1983, played in both games against Juventus, which were Lechia's first ever European games in the 1983–84 European Cup Winners' Cup, and won promotion to the top division by winning the II liga for the 1983–84 season. Marchel played one season with Lechia in the I liga before moving to Olimpia Poznań due to his military service. During his time with Olimpia he played five games over two seasons, moving back to Lechia Gdańsk after his military service was complete. After rejoining Lechia he went on to play 155 games during his second spell, and scoring 6 goals in all competitions. He played his last professional game in a 1–0 defeat to Pogoń Szczecin, before retiring from football aged 28. From 2011, Marchel was involved with Lechia's Oldboys team.

== Death ==
Marchel died on 6 February 2025, at the age of 60.

== Honours ==
Lechia Gdańsk

- II liga West: 1983–84
- III liga, group II: 1982–83
- Polish Cup: 1982–83
- Polish Super Cup: 1983
