= Dariusz Wójtowicz =

Polish footballer

Personal information
- Full name: Dariusz Wójtowicz
- Date of birth: 23 August 1965 (age 61)
- Place of birth: Gdańsk, Poland
- Height: 1.82 m (6 ft 0 in)
- Position: Midfielder

Youth career
- –1982: Lechia Gdańsk

Senior career*
Years	Team	Apps	(Gls)
1982–1986	Lechia Gdańsk	66	(6)
1986–1993	Wisła Kraków	140	(7)
1993	Pogoń Szczecin	11	(0)
1994	Polonia Warsaw	13	(1)
1994–1996	ASV Schrems		

International career
- Poland U18

Managerial career
- 2001–2002: ŁKS Łódź
- 2002: Proszowianka Proszowice
- 2003: Świt Krzeszowice
- 2003–2005: Kmita Zabierzów
- 2007: Kolejarz Stróże (caretaker)
- 2009–2010: Sandecja Nowy Sącz
- 2011–2014: Puszcza Niepołomice
- 2015: Sandecja Nowy Sącz
Medal record
Men's football
Representing Poland
UEFA European Under-18 Championship
Third place	1984 Soviet Union
- * Club domestic league appearances and goals

Dariusz Wójtowicz (born 23 August 1965) is a Polish professional football manager and former player who played as a midfielder. He is mostly known for his spells with Lechia Gdańsk and Wisła Kraków during his playing career, before going on to manage lower league clubs.

== Career ==
=== Football ===
==== Lechia Gdańsk ====
Born in Gdańsk, Wójtowicz started playing football with his local team Lechia Gdańsk. He joined the Lechia first team in 1982, in what would become an historic period for the club. The 1982–83 season saw Lechia winning the III liga with Wójtowicz playing in five games of Lechias winning Polish Cup run, beating Piast Gliwice in the final 2–1. The following season, he played in the Polish Super Cup final as Lechia won by beating the Polish champions Lech Poznań 1–0. He also played in both games as Lechia faced European footballing giants Juventus in a European competition due to the previous season's cup win. Lechia also won promotion to the top division that season by winning the II liga for the 1983–84 season. He played in the top division for Lechia for the first time on 11 August 1984 as Lechia drew 1–1 with Górnik Wałbrzych. His final appearance for Lechia came on 27 April 1986, playing a total of 37 games for Lechia in the top division, and making 82 appearances and scoring 6 goals in all competitions during his time at Lechia.

==== Wisła Kraków ====
In 1986, he joined Wisła Kraków. After originally starting in the second tier with Wisła he helped the team win promotion by finishing runners up in the 1987–88 II liga and finished third in the 1990–91 I liga. In total over the course of seven seasons Wójtowicz played 200 times for Wisła, with 140 of those appearances coming in the league.

==== Later years ====
Wójtowicz had six month spells with Pogoń Szczecin and Polonia Warsaw. He spent the final two seasons of his playing career in Austria playing with ASV Schrems, retiring from playing in 1996.

=== Management ===
Wójtowicz started his managerial career with ŁKS Łódź in 2001. After ŁKS, he had spells with lower league clubs Proszowianka Proszowice, Świt Krzeszowice, Kmita Zabierzów, and a role as caretaker manager at Kolejarz Stróże. In 2009, he joined Sandecja Nowy Sącz, finishing third in the I liga that season. He became manager of Puszcza Niepołomice in 2011, spending 4 seasons with the club. In 2015, he rejoined Sandecja as manager, before leaving the role four months later.

== Honours ==
Lechia Gdańsk

- II liga West: 1983–84
- III liga, group II: 1982–83
- Polish Cup: 1982–83
- Polish Super Cup: 1983

Poland U18

- UEFA European Under-18 Championship third place: 1984
