= Jacek Grembocki =

Polish footballer and manager

Personal information
- Date of birth: 10 March 1965 (age 61)
- Place of birth: Gdańsk, Poland
- Height: 1.76 m (5 ft 9 1/2 in)
- Position: Defender

Team information
- Current team: GKS Kolbudy (manager)

Youth career
- Lechia Gdańsk

Senior career*
| Years | Team | Apps | (Gls) |
| 1982–1986 | Lechia Gdańsk | 100 | (11) |
| 1986–1994 | Górnik Zabrze | 187 | (7) |
| 1995 | Petrochemia Płock | 14 | (1) |
| 1995 | Olimpia-Lechia Gdańsk | 3 | (0) |
| 1996 | Caracas FC | | |
| 1996 | FSV Frankfurt | 9 | (2) |
| 1996 | VfL Osnabrück | | |
| 1996–1997 | Lechia Gdańsk | 31 | (12) |
| 1997–1998 | Elana Toruń | | |
| 1999 | TuS Lingen 1910 | | |
| 2001–2004 | Cartusia Kartuzy | | |
| 2004 | Olimpia Osowa | | |
| 2005 | Orzeł Trąbki Wielkie | | |

International career
| 1987–1994 | Poland | 7 | (0) |

Managerial career
- 2001–2004: Cartusia Kartuzy
- 2004: Olimpia Osowa
- 2005: Orzeł Trąbki Wielkie
- 2007–2008: Znicz Pruszków
- 2009: Polonia Warsaw
- 2010–2011: Bałtyk Gdynia
- Amator Kiełpino
- AS Kolbudy
- AP Grembocki
- 2019–: GKS Kolbudy
- * Club domestic league appearances and goals

Jacek Grembocki (born 10 May 1965) is a Polish football manager and former player. Besides Poland, he has played in Venezuela and Germany.

== Career ==
=== Playing career ===
==== Club ====
He began his career with Lechia Gdańsk and also debuted as senior there. In 1983, Lechia won the Polish Cup as a team from the 3rd division and Grembocki was part of the team.

Lechia sold him in 1986 as they were on the verge of bankruptcy at the time. Lech Poznań, ŁKS Łódź, and Zagłębie Lubin were all interested. Grembocki joined Górnik Zabrze though and played for 9 seasons winning the Polish title in 1987 and 1988. He also played for Petrochemia Płock and for a few clubs in Venezuela and Germany.

He captained Lechia, Górnik and Petrochemia during his career.

==== International ====
He debuted for Poland on 18 March 1987 against Finland. His last international match was in 1994.

In 1992, Chelsea sent an inquiry to Górnik Zabrze, however the transfer was never finalized.

=== Managerial career ===
He holds an UEFA Pro coaching licence.

On 21 April 2009 Grembocki joined Polonia Warsaw as the manager.

He also was manager of Znicz Pruszków at the time when Robert Lewandowski played for them.

== Personal life ==
Grembocki supports Lechia Gdańsk.

== Honours ==
Lechia Gdańsk

- Polish Cup: 1982–83
- Polish Super Cup: 1983

Górnik Zabrze

- Ekstraklasa: 1986–87, 1987–88
- Polish Super Cup: 1988
