= Tadeusz Fajfer =

Polish association football player

Personal information
- Full name: Tadeusz Fajfer
- Date of birth: 24 April 1959 (age 67)
- Place of birth: Poznań, Poland
- Height: 1.80 m (5 ft 11 in)
- Position: Goalkeeper

Youth career
- –1980: Lech Poznań

Senior career*
Years	Team	Apps	(Gls)
1980–1982	Lech Poznań	0	(0)
1982–1984	Lechia Gdańsk	41	(0)
1985–1989	Chrobry Głogów		
1991–1992	Czarni Wróblewo		
1992–1993	VfL Herzlake		
1993–1998	Dyskobolia Grodzisk Wlkp.		
- * Club domestic league appearances and goals

Tadeusz Fajfer (born 24 April 1959) is a Polish former footballer who played as a goalkeeper.

== Biography ==
Born in Poznań, Fajfer first started his footballing career with Lech Poznań, advancing through the academy before being part of the team in 1980. After two seasons of failing to make an appearance due to being third choice behind Piotr Mowlik and Zbigniew Pleśnierowicz he moved to Lechia Gdańsk in 1982, making his professional league debut against Olimpia Elbląg on 1 September 1982. During his time with Lechia he won the III liga for the 1982–83 season, he played in 5 of the 7 games during the cup run which won the Polish Cup in 1983, beating Piast Gliwice in the final, he played in the Polish SuperCup win over Lech Poznań in 1983, played in both games against Juventus, which were Lechia's first ever European games in the 1983–84 European Cup Winners' Cup, and won promotion to the top division by winning the II liga for the 1983–84 season. During his time at Lechia he played in 51 games. In total Fajfer played 8 games in the I liga before moving down the leagues to play with Chrobry Głogów in 1985. He played for Czarni Wróblewo from 1991–1992, he had a season in Germany with VfL Herzlake with whom he won the Oberliga Nord, before returning to Poland to play with Dyskobolia Grodzisk Wielkopolski. He spent 5 seasons with Dyskobolia, helping the team to go from the fourth division in 1993 to win promotion to the top division in 1997. In his final season with the club, he played 28 out of 30 games in the 1997–98 I liga season before retiring after the club suffered relegation. After retiring he worked as the goalkeeping coach with Dyskobolia before holding the role of sporting director at Polonia Warsaw and Warta Poznań.

== Honours ==
Lechia Gdańsk

- II liga West: 1983–84
- III liga, gr. II: 1982–83
- Polish Cup: 1982–83
- Polish Super Cup: 1983

VfL Herzlake

- Oberliga Nord: 1992–93

Dyskobolia Grodzisk Wielkopolski

- II liga West: 1996–97
- III liga, gr. VIII: 1995–96
