= Leszek Pisz =

Polish footballer

Personal information
- Date of birth: 18 December 1966 (age 59)
- Place of birth: Dębica, Poland
- Height: 1.67 m (5 ft 6 in)
- Position: Midfielder

Senior career*
Years	Team	Apps	(Gls)
1977–1984	Wisłoka Dębica		
1984–1986	Igloopol Dębica		
1986–1987	Legia Warsaw	0	(0)
1987	Igloopol Dębica		
1987–1991	Legia Warsaw	94	(14)
1992	Motor Lublin	33	(8)
1992–1996	Legia Warsaw	127	(31)
1996	PAOK	11	(0)
1997–2000	Kavala	99	(27)
2000	Paniliakos	10	(0)
2001	Śląsk Wrocław	13	(1)
2002	Pogoń Staszów		

International career
1990–1996	Poland	14	(1)

Managerial career
- Igloopol Dębica U18
- * Club domestic league appearances and goals

Leszek Pisz (Polish pronunciation: [ˈlɛʂɛk ˈpiʂ]) (born 18 December 1966 in Dębica) is a Polish former professional footballer who played as a midfielder. In 1995, he was voted the Polish Footballer of the Year.

== History ==
Pisz arrived at Legia Warsaw in 1986 from Igloopol Dębica. At first, he was a substitute, but later he became a star of the team. He was known as a free-kicks specialist, scoring many goals from dead-ball situations.

In 1995, Legia won the Ekstraklasa title and qualified for the Champions League, where the team made it to the quarterfinals. Pisz performed admirably in Legia's first group match against Rosenborg, scoring two goals, including the tying goal for Legia. That made him the first player to score for a Polish team during Champions League group stages.

Pisz later moved to Greece, before returning to Poland and ending his career in 2002.

== Honours ==
Legia Warsaw

- Ekstraklasa: 1993–94, 1994–95
- Polish Cup: 1988–89, 1989–90, 1993–94, 1994–95
- Polish Super Cup: 1989, 1994

Individual

- Piłka Nożna Polish Footballer of the Year: 1995
