= Dariusz Raczyński =

Polish footballer (1962–2022)

Personal information
- Date of birth: 30 May 1962
- Place of birth: Gdańsk, Poland
- Date of death: 12 October 2022 (aged 60)
- Place of death: Gdańsk, Poland
- Height: 1.80 m (5 ft 11 in)
- Position: Midfielder

Youth career
- –1979: Lechia Gdańsk

Senior career*
Years	Team	Apps	(Gls)
1980–1985	Lechia Gdańsk	98	(7)
1985–1987	Igloopol Dębica		
1987–1988	Arka Gdynia		
- * Club domestic league appearances and goals

Dariusz Raczyński (30 May 1962 – 12 October 2022) was a Polish footballer who played as a midfielder. He is best known for winning the Polish Cup and Polish Super Cup in 1983 with his hometown club Lechia Gdańsk, their first major trophies and greatest success to date.

== Career ==
Raczyński was born in Gdańsk on 30 May 1962. He made his footballing debut with Lechia Gdańsk on 16 March 1980 playing against PKS Odra Wrocław. In his first three seasons he made 48 appearances and scored 5 goals in the II liga, with Lechia suffering relegation to the third tier at the end of his third season.

Despite being relegated it was a time which would become an historic period for the club. The 1982–83 season saw Lechia winning the III liga with Raczyński making 13 appearances and scored 2 league goals as Lechia won the division and playing in five games of Lechia's winning Polish Cup run, beating Piast Gliwice in the final 2–1. The following season Lechia won the Polish Super Cup final by beating the Polish champions Lech Poznań 1–0, with Raczyński starting the game. He also played in a 3–2 home defeat against Juventus in a European competition due to the previous season's cup win. Lechia also won promotion to the top division that season by winning the II liga for the 1983–84 season.

That season would prove to be his last playing for Lechia, having made his final appearance for the club on 8 June 1985 against GKS Katowice. In total for Lechia he made 111 appearances and scored 9 in all competitions.

Raczyński then played a further two seasons for Igloopol Dębica and then one and a half for Arka Gdynia, with whom he won promotion to the second division in 1988 before retiring six months later.

== Death ==
Raczyński died in his hometown Gdańsk after a serious illness on 12 October 2022, at the age of 60.

== Honours ==
Lechia Gdańsk

- Polish Cup: 1982–83
- Polish Super Cup: 1983
- II liga (western group): 1983–84
- III liga (group II): 1982–83

Arka Gdynia

- III liga (group II): 1987–88
