= 1986–87 Ekstraklasa =

60th season of top-tier football league in Poland

Liga
- Season: 1986–87
- Champions: Górnik Zabrze (13th title)
- Relegated: Polonia Bytom; Ruch Chorzów; Stal Mielec; Motor Lublin
- Matches: 237
- Goals: 535 (2.26 per match)
- Top goalscorer: Marek Leśniak (24 goals)
- Average attendance: 9,529 ▼5.1%

Statistics of Ekstraklasa for the 1986–87 season.

== Overview ==
It was contested by 16 teams, and Górnik Zabrze won the championship.

== League table ==
Pos	Team	Pld	W	3W	D	3L	L	GF	GA	GD	Pts	Qualification or relegation
1	Górnik Zabrze (C)	30	9	7	10	0	4	52	21	+31	49	Qualification to European Cup first round
2	Pogoń Szczecin	30	10	5	10	1	4	64	39	+25	44	Qualification to UEFA Cup first round
3	GKS Katowice	30	8	6	10	1	5	48	26	+22	43	Qualification to UEFA Cup first round
4	Śląsk Wrocław	30	10	3	11	0	6	37	23	+14	40	Qualification to Cup Winners' Cup first round
5	Legia Warsaw	30	11	1	14	1	3	44	28	+16	38	
6	Widzew Łódź	30	12	2	7	1	8	34	29	+5	36	
7	Lech Poznań	29	6	3	11	3	6	36	35	+1	29	
8	Zagłębie Lubin	29	8	0	12	0	9	27	25	+2	28	
9	ŁKS Łódź	30	5	3	10	2	10	30	33	−3	27	
10	Górnik Wałbrzych	30	9	1	7	3	10	31	43	−12	25	
11	Lechia Gdańsk (O)	30	5	2	9	1	13	23	30	−7	24	Qualification to Relegation playoffs
12	Olimpia Poznań (O)	29	6	0	14	4	5	21	35	−14	22	Qualification to Relegation playoffs
13	Polonia Bytom (R)	29	4	1	14	4	6	24	37	−13	21	Qualification to Relegation playoffs
14	Ruch Chorzów (R)	29	3	0	14	2	10	16	33	−17	18	Qualification to Relegation playoffs
15	Stal Mielec (R)	29	5	0	10	3	11	24	44	−20	17	Relegated to II liga
16	Motor Lublin (R)	30	6	0	9	8	7	20	50	−30	13	Relegated to II liga

Source: 90minut.pl (in Polish)
Rules for classification: 1st points; 2nd goal difference; 3rd goals scored. 1 extra point for each win with a goal difference of 3 or more, and 1 point deducted for each loss with a goal difference of 3 or more.
(C) Champion; (O) Play-off winner; (R) Relegated

== Results ==
Home \ Away	GWŁ	KAT	GÓR	LPO	LGD	LEG	ŁKS	MOL	OLP	POG	BYT	RUC	STA	ŚLĄ	WID	ZLU
Górnik Wałbrzych		0–2	0–2	0–0	2–1	2–1	0–3	0–0	0–1	1–0	2–1	2–1	2–1	0–4	0–0	1–3
GKS Katowice	1–0		0–1	3–0	1–0	5–2	1–1	6–0	1–1	1–1	4–1	1–1	5–0	1–0	1–0	1–0
Górnik Zabrze	1–1	1–0		3–0	3–1	3–4	3–0	1–2	2–0	2–1	4–0	3–1	5–2	0–0	4–0	1–3
Lech Poznań	1–1	1–4	0–0		2–1	0–0	0–2	1–1	3–0	2–2	– (Note: The matches Lech Poznań - Polonia Bytom 1–1, Olimpia Poznań - Stal Mielec 1–3 and Zagłębie Lubin - Ruch Chorzów 0–2 cancelled due to matches fixing allegation.)	5–0	3–1	0–0	1–1	3–1
Lechia Gdańsk	2–1	1–0	0–0	0–1		1–1	3–0	4–0	1–2	1–1	0–0	0–1	0–0	1–0	0–1	1–0
Legia Warsaw	2–1	0–0	0–0	2–0	1–1		2–2	1–0	1–0	2–0	4–0	2–0	2–0	3–1	0–1	1–1
ŁKS Łódź	0–1	0–1	0–1	0–0	1–1	1–3		5–2	5–2	1–3	1–1	1–0	1–1	0–1	1–0	1–0
Motor Lublin	1–4	0–0	0–3	2–0	2–0	1–1	0–0		1–1	0–4	0–3	1–0	1–0	0–3	0–1	1–1
Olimpia Poznań	2–3	1–1	0–3	0–2	0–0	1–1	0–0	1–0		1–1	1–0	0–0	–	2–1	1–1	0–0
Pogoń Szczecin	3–4	7–2	2–2	2–1	5–1	4–3	3–2	2–0	3–0		2–0	4–1	1–1	1–1	3–1	2–1
Polonia Bytom	2–0	0–0	1–1	1–1	0–1	0–0	2–0	1–1	1–1	1–1		0–0	3–3	0–1	0–0	1–1
Ruch Chorzów	0–0	0–2	0–0	1–1	0–0	0–0	0–0	1–2	1–1	2–2	1–2		1–0	0–0	0–1	0–0
Stal Mielec	2–1	3–1	1–2	0–3	1–0	1–1	0–0	1–0	1–1	0–1	1–2	0–2		0–0	1–0	0–0
Śląsk Wrocław	1–1	0–0	1–1	3–1	2–1	1–3	1–0	2–1	0–0	4–1	2–0	1–1	3–2		2–1	1–0
Widzew Łódź	3–0	4–3	1–0	2–1	1–0	1–1	1–0	3–1	0–1	0–1	3–0	2–1	1–1	1–1		2–1
Zagłębie Lubin	2–1	0–0	0–0	2–3	1–0	0–0	0–2	0–0	2–0	1–1	1–1	–	2–0	1–0	3–1	

Source: 90minut.pl (in Polish)
Legend: Blue = home team win; Yellow = draw; Red = away team win.

== Relegation playoffs ==
The matches were played on 28 June and 1 July 1987.

Team 1	Agg.	Team 2	1st leg	2nd leg
Polonia Bytom	2–2 (a)	Olimpia Poznań	2–2	0–0
Ruch Chorzów	2–4	Lechia Gdańsk	1–2	1–2

== Top goalscorers ==
Rank	Player	Club	Goals
1	(Poland) Marek Leśniak	Pogoń Szczecin	24
2	(Poland) Jan Furtok	GKS Katowice	16
3	(Poland) Krzysztof Walczak	Polonia Bytom	15
4	(Poland) Marek Koniarek	GKS Katowice	13
4	(Poland) Eugeniusz Ptak	Zagłębie Lubin	13
6	(Poland) Dariusz Dziekanowski	Legia Warsaw	11
6	(Poland) Jan Urban	Górnik Zabrze	11
8	(Poland) Ryszard Tarasiewicz	Śląsk Wrocław	10
9	(Poland) Marek Filipczak	Stal Mielec	9
9	(Poland) Kazimierz Sokolowski	Pogoń Szczecin	9
9	(Poland) Andrzej Iwan	Górnik Zabrze	9
9	(Poland) Bogusław Pachelski	Lech Poznań	9
9	(Poland) Marek Majka	Górnik Zabrze	9

== Attendances ==
#	Club	Average
1	Górnik Zabrze	15,533
2	Pogoń Szczecin	14,067
3	Śląsk Wrocław	13,400
4	Zagłębie Lubin	13,000
5	Lech Poznań	11,733
6	Lechia Gdańsk	10,867
7	Legia Warszawa	10,667
8	Katowice	9,800
9	Widzew Łódź	9,067
10	Polonia Bytom	7,867
11	Górnik Wałbrzych	7,100
12	Ruch Chorzów	6,800
13	ŁKS	6,667
14	Olimpia Poznań	6,000
15	Motor Lublin	5,400
16	Stal Mielec	4,500
