= Ryszard Polak =

Polish association football player

Personal information
- Full name: Ryszard Polak
- Date of birth: 26 February 1959
- Place of birth: Sopot, Poland
- Date of death: 9 September 2017 (aged 58)
- Height: 1.77 m (5 ft 10 in)
- Position: Forward

Youth career
- –1976: Lechia Gdańsk

Senior career*
| Years | Team | Apps | (Gls) |
| 1976–1979 | Lechia Gdańsk | 52 | (3) |
| 1980–1981 | Zawisza Bydgoszcz | 4 | (0) |
| 1982–1985 | Lechia Gdańsk | 79 | (18) |
| 1985–1987 | Igloopol Dębica | | |
- * Club domestic league appearances and goals

Ryszard Polak (26 February 1959 – 9 September 2017) was a Polish footballer who played as a forward. He is most well known for his spell with Lechia Gdańsk.

== Biography ==
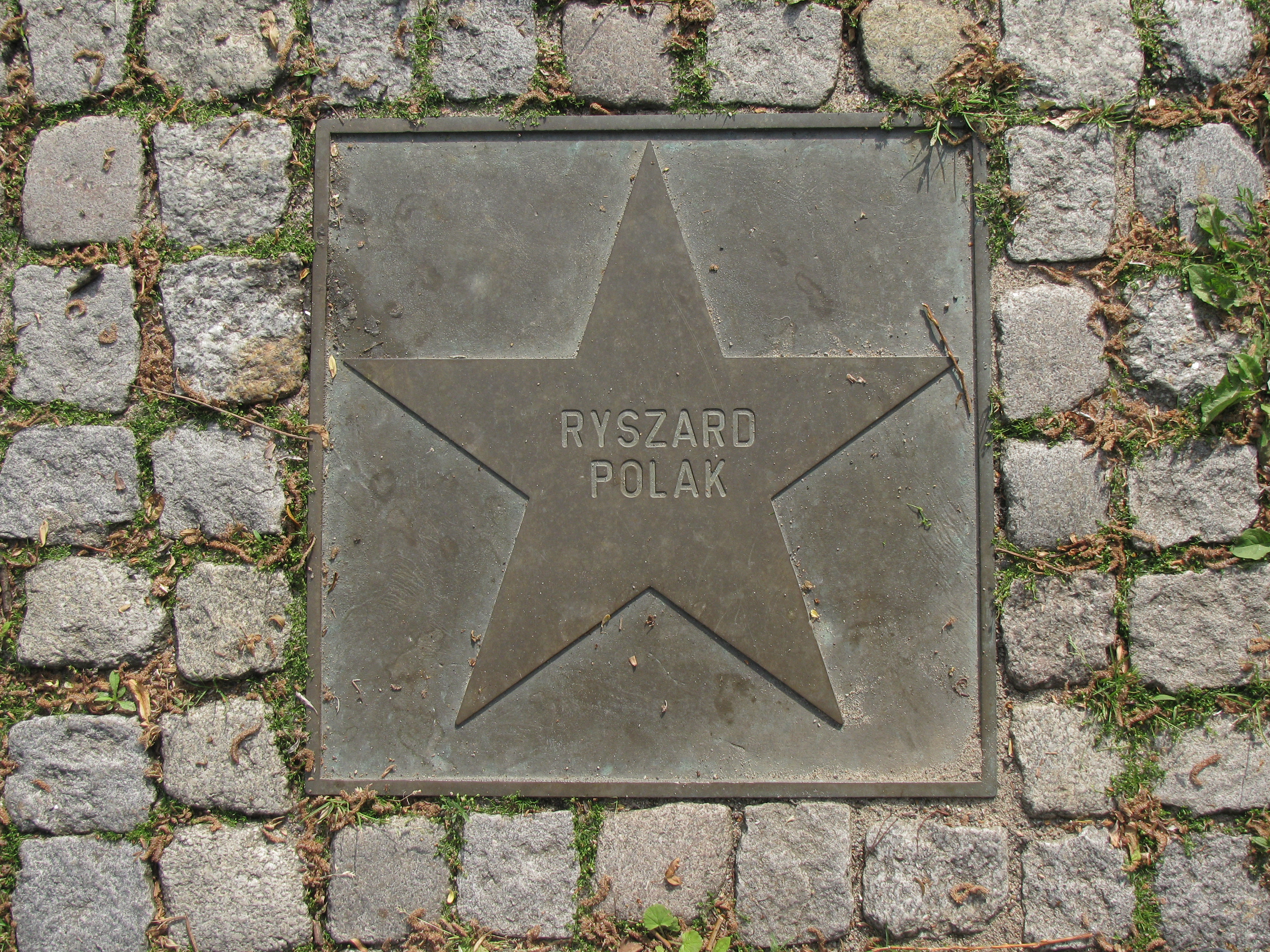
Ryszard Polak's star on Lechia's "Avenue of Stars".

Born in Sopot, Polak started his footballing career training with the youth sides of Lechia Gdańsk. He made his Lechia debut on 24 April 1976 aged 17 against Ursus Warsaw. In his first spell with Lechia, he made 52 league appearances, scoring 3 goals. He had a brief spell with Zawisza Bydgoszcz in 1980 and the whole of 1981 while he did his mandatory military training, making a total of 4 appearances during his time with the club. He returned to Lechia towards the end of the 1981–82 season, being unable to save Lechia from relegation to the third tier. Despite being relegated to the third tier, it was a time which would become an historic period for the club. The 1982–83 season saw Lechia winning the III liga with Polak playing in five games of Lechias winning Polish Cup run, beating Piast Gliwice in the final 2–1. The following season Lechia won the Polish Super Cup final as Lechia won by beating the Polish champions Lech Poznań 1–0, with Polak starting the game. He also played in both games as Lechia faced European footballing giants Juventus in a European competition due to the previous season's cup win. Lechia also won promotion to the top division that season by winning the II liga for the 1983–84 season. Polak played 20 times and scored 2 for Lechia the following season in the I liga. That season would prove to be his last playing for Lechia, having made his final appearance for the club on 19 July 1985 against Górnik Zabrze. In total for Lechia he made 143 appearances and scored 22 in all competitions. After his time with Lechia he spent 2 seasons with Igloopol Dębica before moving to Germany. After his move to Germany he was unable to play due to injuries and failing with annual disqualification imposed on him by his native Poland. As a result, he instead played in "Oldboy" teams. He spent his later years working as a scout looking for players with Polish roots to potentially play for the national team. Polak has had a star on Lechia's "'Avenue of Stars" since September 2005. He died on 9 September 2017 aged 58.

== Honours ==
Lechia Gdańsk

- Polish Cup: 1982–83
- Polish Super Cup: 1983
- II liga West: 1983–84
- III liga, gr. II: 1982–83
