= Zbigniew Kowalski (footballer, born 1958) =

Polish footballer

Personal information
- Full name: Zbigniew Kowalski
- Date of birth: 20 December 1958 (age 67)
- Place of birth: Warsaw, Poland
- Height: 1.75 m (5 ft 9 in)
- Position: Midfielder

Youth career
- –1977: Lechia Gdańsk

Senior career*
Years	Team	Apps	(Gls)
1977–1984	Lechia Gdańsk	78	(6)
- * Club domestic league appearances and goals

Zbigniew Kowalski (born 20 December 1958) is a Polish former footballer who played as a midfielder.

== Football ==
Kowalski is most well known for his time with Lechia Gdańsk. He made his Lechia debut on 31 July 1977 in the Polish Cup against Stal Stalowa Wola. In his first 4 seasons Kowalski made 52 league appearances before Lechia were relegated at the end of the 1981–82 season. Despite being relegated to the third tier, it was a time which would become an historic period for the club. The 1982–83 season saw Lechia winning the III liga with Kowalski playing in five games of Lechias winning Polish Cup run, beating Piast Gliwice in the final 2–1. The following season Lechia won the Polish Super Cup final as Lechia won by beating the Polish champions Lech Poznań 1–0, but Kowalski was not part of that squad. He also played in both games as Lechia faced European footballing giants Juventus in a European competition due to the previous season's cup win. Lechia also won promotion to the top division that season by winning the II liga for the 1983–84 season. Kowalski left Lechia the following season after 26 league games in the club's two promotion seasons.

== Honours ==
Lechia Gdańsk

- II liga West: 1983–84
- III liga, group II: 1982–83
- Polish Cup: 1982–83
- Polish Super Cup: 1983
