= Krzysztof Górski =

Polish association football player

Personal information
- Full name: Krzysztof Górski
- Date of birth: 13 September 1958
- Place of birth: Poland
- Height: 1.76 m (5 ft 9 in)
- Position: Forward

Senior career*
Years	Team	Apps	(Gls)
- Start Łódź
1979–1980	Concordia Elbląg		
1982–1983	Lechia Gdańsk	30	(7)
- * Club domestic league appearances and goals

Krzysztof Górski (born 13 September 1958) is a Polish former professional footballer who played as a forward.

== Biography ==
Górski starting his career playing with Start Łódź. Due to playing in the lower divisions of Polish football many clubs he played for are unknown, it is known however that he played for Concordia Elbląg for the 1979–80 season. He had his most notable spell in football with Lechia Gdańsk from January 1982 to December 1983. In total he played 36 games and scored 8 goals for Lechia, scoring Lechia's second goal in the 1983 Polish Cup, was an unused substitute in Lechia's Polish SuperCup in 1983, and came on as a substitute in Lechia's 7–0 defeat to Juventus in Lechia's first ever European game. After issues with his character and problems with some team-mates, Górski left Lechia in December 1983, playing 3 league games that season.

== Honours ==
Lechia Gdańsk

- Polish Cup
  - Winners: 1983
- Polish SuperCup
  - Winners: 1983
- III liga (group II)
  - Winners: 1982–83
