= Robert Dymkowski =

Polish footballer (born 1970)

Personal information
- Full name: Robert Jarosław Dymkowski
- Date of birth: 15 May 1970 (age 56)
- Place of birth: Koszalin, Poland
- Height: 1.82 m (6 ft 0 in)
- Position: Forward

Senior career*
Years	Team	Apps	(Gls)
1989–1990	Gwardia Koszalin		
1990–2002	Pogoń Szczecin		
1996–1997	→ PAOK (loan)		
2002–2003	Widzew Łódź	25	(6)
2004	Arka Gdynia	28	(12)

Managerial career
- 2022–2023: Pogoń Szczecin (women)
- * Club domestic league appearances and goals

Robert Jarosław Dymkowski (born 15 May 1970) is a Polish former professional football who played as a forward for Gwardia Koszalin, Pogoń Szczecin, PAOK, Widzew Łódź, Arka Gdynia. He retired in 2005.

In July 2023, he was diagnosed with ALS.

== Honours ==
Individual

- I liga top scorer: 1990–91
