= Zbigniew Pleśnierowicz =

Polish footballer

Personal information
- Date of birth: 20 September 1958 (age 68)
- Place of birth: Wrocław, Poland
- Height: 1.85 m (6 ft 1 in)
- Position: Goalkeeper

Team information
- Current team: Lech Poznań U13 (goalkeeping coach)

Youth career
- Budowlani Lisków
- Włókniarz Kalisz

Senior career*
Years	Team	Apps	(Gls)
1979–1982	Legia Warsaw	1	(0)
1982–1988	Lech Poznań	125	(0)
1988	Polska IF Kopernik		
1989–1990	FF Södertälje		
1991–1994	Warta Poznań	79	(0)
1994–1997	Amica Wronki	56	(0)
- * Club domestic league appearances and goals

Zbigniew Pleśnierowicz (born 20 September 1958) is a Polish former professional footballer who played as a goalkeeper. He is currently a goalkeeping coach for Lech Poznań under-13s, and has previously worked in the same capacity for Lech's senior, reserve and other youth teams.

He is related to Polish footballer Wiktor Pleśnierowicz.

== Honours ==
Lech Poznań

- Ekstraklasa: 1982–83, 1983–84
- Polish Cup: 1983–84, 1987–88
