= Zenon Burzawa =

Polish footballer and manager

Personal information
- Date of birth: 1 July 1961 (age 65)
- Place of birth: Gorzów Wielkopolski, Poland
- Position: Forward

Youth career
- –1978: SHR Wojcieszyce

Senior career*
Years	Team	Apps	(Gls)
1978–1982	SHR Wojcieszyce		
1982–1983	Pogoń Skwierzyna		
1983–1984	Stoczniowiec Barlinek		
1984–1993	Stilon Gorzów Wielkopolski		
1993–1994	Miliarder Pniewy		
1994	AS Lyon-Duchère		
1995–1997	GKP Gorzów Wielkopolski		
1997	Aluminium Konin		
1998	GKP Gorzów Wielkopolski		

Managerial career
- 2000–2001: GKP Gorzów Wielkopolski
- 2001–2003: Pogoń Barlinek
- 2003–2005: GKP Gorzów Wielkopolski
- 2006–2010: Dąb Dębno
- 2010–2011: Meprozet Stare Kurowo
- 2012: Piast Karnin
- 2012–2018: Spójnia Ośno Lubuskie
- 2018–2023: Meprozet Stare Kurowo
- * Club domestic league appearances and goals

Zenon Burzawa (born 1 July 1961) is a Polish football manager and former player who played as a forward. He was the Ekstraklasa top goalscorer of the 1993–94 season.

== Honours ==
=== Player ===
Individual

- Ekstraklasa top scorer: 1993–94

=== Manager ===
GKP Gorzów Wielkopolski

- Regional league Gorzów Wielkopolski: 2003–04

Dąb Dębno

- V liga Szczecin: 2006–07

Meprozet Stare Kurowo

- Regional league Gorzów Wielkopolski: 2010–11, 2018–19
