= Vangelis Krios =

Greek footballer

Personal information
- Full name: Evangelos Dimitrios Krios
- Date of birth: 23 September 1973 (age 53)
- Place of birth: Mouzaki, Greece
- Position: Midfielder

Youth career
- –1993: Olympiacos

Senior career*
Years	Team	Apps	(Gls)
1993–1995	Levadiakos	50	(0)
1995–1996	Ialysos	?	(?)
1996–1998	Edessaikos	11	(4)
–	Apollon Kalamarias	?	(?)
1998–2006	Ceuta		
2006	Ponferradina	?	(?)
2006–2007	Ceuta	9	(0)
Total		?	(?)
- * Club domestic league appearances and goals

Vangelis Krios (Greek: Βαγγέλης Κρύος; born 23 September 1973) is a Greek former professional footballer who played as a midfielder.

== Career ==
Born in Mouzaki, Krios began playing youth football for Olympiacos F.C. He signed his first professional contract with Levadiakos F.C. during 1993, making 50 Alpha Ethniki appearances for the club in two seasons, the latter resulting in relegation to the second division. Krios joined Greek second division side Ialysos F.C. for the 1995–96 season. He would return to the Greek top division by signing with Edessaikos F.C. in December 1996, and would appear in a further 11 Alpha Ethniki matches for the club. Edessaikos were relegated and Krios began the 1997–98 season with the club in the second division.

Next, Krios moved to Spain, where he played club football for Ponferradina and Ceuta over the next 10 seasons.

Following his playing career, Krios stayed in Spain and plans to become a coach.
