= Jerzy Wojnecki =

Polish footballer

Personal information
- Date of birth: 11 May 1975
- Place of birth: Nowy Sącz, Poland
- Date of death: 3 October 2009 (aged 34)
- Place of death: Płock, Poland
- Height: 1.89 m (6 ft 2 in)
- Position: Defender

Senior career*
Years	Team	Apps	(Gls)
1992–1993	Sandecja Nowy Sącz		
1994–1997	Hutnik Kraków	63	(3)
1997–1998	Legia Warsaw	24	(0)
1999	Zagłębie Lubin	2	(0)
1999–2003	Wisła Płock		
2004	Świt Nowy Dwór	7	(0)
2004–2005	Arka Gdynia	28	(2)
2006–2007	Zawisza Bydgoszcz (2)	12	(0)
2005–2006	Tur Turek		
2006–2007	Kujawiak Włocławek		
2008	Mień Lipno	9	(0)
- * Club domestic league appearances and goals

Jerzy Wojnecki (11 May 1975 – 3 October 2009) was a Polish professional footballer who played as a defender.
