= Tasos Tasiopoulos =

Greek footballer

Personal information
- Full name: Anastasios Tasiopoulos
- Date of birth: 25 April 1968 (age 58)
- Place of birth: Athens, Greece
- Height: 1.83 m (6 ft 0 in)
- Position: Defender

Senior career*
| Years | Team | Apps | (Gls) |
| –1994 | Charavgiakos | | |
| 1994–1996 | Athinaikos | 64 | (7) |
| 1996–1998 | PAOK | 59 | (3) |
| 1998–2000 | Paniliakos | 61 | (8) |
| 2000–2001 | Athinaikos | 9 | (1) |
| 2001–2002 | Fostiras | | |

Managerial career
- 2006: Ilioupoli
- 2010: Rouf
- * Club domestic league appearances and goals

Tasos Tasiopoulos (Greek: Τάσος Τασιόπουλος; born 25 April 1968) is a Greek former professional footballer.

During his club career, Tasiopoulos played for Charavgiakos, Athinaikos, PAOK, Paniliakos, and Fostiras. Tasiopoulos joined Paniliakos from PAOK before the 1998–99 season.

Following his playing career, Tasiopoulos became a football manager. He has managed Ilioupoli and Rouf in the Gamma Ethniki.
