= Panagiotis Katsouris =

Greek footballer (1976–1998)

Personal information
- Full name: Panagiotis Katsouris
- Date of birth: 28 October 1976
- Place of birth: Athens, Greece
- Date of death: 9 February 1998 (aged 21)
- Height: 1.70 m (5 ft 7 in)
- Position: Midfielder

Senior career*
Years	Team	Apps	(Gls)
1993–1996	Naoussa	13	(6)
1996–1998	PAOK	24	(1)
Total		37	(7)

International career
- Greece U21
- * Club domestic league appearances and goals

Panagiotis Katsouris (Greek: Παναγιώτης Κατσούρης, 28 October 1976 – 9 February 1998) was a Greek football player. He played for Naoussa F.C. and PAOK FC until his sudden death in a car accident outside Thessaloniki. He was 21 years old.

== Career ==
Katsouris began his professional career in Naoussa where he transferred from Academy Platonas Athens at age 17, making his debut in the First Division in 1993, with Naoussa being relegated that season.

After two seasons in the Second Division he transferred to PAOK in the summer of 1996, along with major players such as Theodoros Zagorakis, Paris Zouboulis, Alexis Alexiou, Giorgos Toursounidis and Zisis Vryzas.

Katsouris made his debut that season in a match against OFI in the Greek League and scored his first goal in a 1–0 victory over Athinaikos. By the end of his first season he had played in 21 league games, scoring 1 goal.

He played a total of 29 games with PAOK, of which 24 were League appearances, 4 were Cup appearances and one was in the UEFA Cup, away against Atlético Madrid. His uncle was the Greek football manager Babis Tennes.

== Death ==
In the night of 9 February 1998 Katsouris was returning from an amateur 5x5 match, when his car skidded due to excessive speed, hitting the barriers at the Thermi interchange outside Thessaloniki. His death was verified in AHEPA hospital shortly afterwards. He was buried on 12 February in the Third Cemetery of Athens.

A bust was erected in his memory in Toumba Stadium, and a memorial was erected near the spot where he died. Memorial services are held each year, where the players and board of PAOK FC are ever present. In February 2009, PAOK FC announced that a football tournament, which bearing his name, would be held annually.

Katsouris' number 17 jersey was permanently retired by the club in his memory.
