= Georgios Chatzizisis =

Greek footballer

Personal information
- Date of birth: 4 June 1978 (age 48)
- Place of birth: Velventos, Greece
- Height: 1.75 m (5 ft 9 in)
- Position: Right-back

Senior career*
Years	Team	Apps	(Gls)
1994–1996	Eordaikos	49	(6)
1996–1997	PAOK	16	(0)
1997–2000	Kavala	62	(2)
2000–2001	Apollon Smyrnis	23	(2)
2001–2002	PAOK	0	(0)
2002–2003	Apollon Kalamarias	15	(1)
2003–2006	Olympiacos Volos	69	(2)
2006–2010	Pierikos	75	(0)
2010–2011	Doxa Drama	23	(0)
2011–2012	Pierikos	24	(0)
2012–2015	Apollon Smyrnis	36	(0)

International career^{‡}
1999	Greece	2	(0)
- * Club domestic league appearances and goals as of 30 December 2012 ‡ National team caps and goals as of 30 December 2012

Georgios Chatzizisis (Greek: Γεώργιος Χατζηζήσης; born 4 June 1978) is a Greek former professional footballer who played as a right-back.
