= Marek Majka =

Polish footballer

Personal information
- Date of birth: 5 January 1959 (age 67)
- Place of birth: Gliwice, Poland
- Height: 1.78 m (5 ft 10 in)
- Position: Forward

Senior career*
Years	Team	Apps	(Gls)
1976–1983	Piast Gliwice		
1983–1988	Górnik Zabrze	137	(31)
1988–1991	SC Freiburg	62	(22)
1991–1994	SV Oberweier 1910		
1994	Odra Wodzisław		
1994–1996	Carbo Gliwice		

Managerial career
- 1998–2000: Błękitni Kielce
- 2001: Piast Gliwice
- 2005–2009: Orlęta Radzyń Podlaski
- 2011–2012: Przyszłość Ciochowice
- 2013: LKS Szaflary
- * Club domestic league appearances and goals

Marek Majka (born 5 January 1959) is a Polish professional football manager and former player who played as a forward.

== Honours ==
Górnik Zabrze

- Ekstraklasa: 1984–85, 1985–86, 1986–87, 1987–88
