= Marek Leśniak =

Polish footballer and manager

Personal information
- Full name: Marek Sebastian Leśniak
- Date of birth: 29 February 1964 (age 62)
- Place of birth: Goleniów, Poland
- Height: 1.75 m (5 ft 9 in)
- Position: Striker

Team information
- Current team: FV Wiehl (youth) (manager)

Youth career
- 1974–1982: Pomorzanin Nowogard

Senior career*
Years	Team	Apps	(Gls)
1982–1988	Pogoń Szczecin	150	(65)
1988–1992	Bayer Leverkusen	117	(19)
1992–1995	SG Wattenscheid 09	96	(25)
1995	1860 Munich	15	(2)
1996	KFC Uerdingen	17	(3)
1996–1997	Neuchâtel Xamax	41	(12)
1997–1999	Fortuna Düsseldorf	52	(16)
1999–2002	Preußen Münster	90	(30)
2002–2005	SSVg Velbert	81	(44)
2005–2006	Hilden-Nord		

International career
- Poland U20
1986–1994	Poland	20	(10)

Managerial career
- 2002–2005: SSVg Velbert (player-coach)
- 2005–2006: Germania Ratingen
- 2007–2009: Schwarz-Weiß Rehden
- 2009–2010: SSVg Velbert
- 2010: SG Wattenscheid 09
- 2011–2013: TuSpo Richrath
- 2015–2018: SpVg Olpe
- 2018–2020: SV Frielingsdorf
- 2021–: FV Wiehl (youth)
- 2022: FV Wiehl (caretaker)
Medal record
Men's football
Representing Poland
FIFA World Youth Championship
Third place	1983 Mexico
- * Club domestic league appearances and goals

Marek Sebastian Leśniak (born 29 February 1964) is a Polish former professional footballer who played as a striker. A prolific goalscorer, he was successful in his country in the 1980s, and then had a career in Germany which spanned nearly 20 years, broken by a half-year stint in Switzerland. In 1993, he won the Polish Footballer of the Year Award presented by the Piłka Nożna football weekly.

== Career ==
Leśniak was born in Goleniów. He started his professional career with Pogoń Szczecin, topping the Ekstraklasa goal charts in 1986–87, for a final runner-up position. In 1988, he moved abroad, with German side Bayer Leverkusen, starting his stint of well by scoring three Bundesliga goals in his first six games.

After a couple of solid seasons, Leśniak lost his importance in the side after the arrival of Ulf Kirsten, eventually leaving in 1992 to SG Wattenscheid 09, totalling 25 goals in three seasons. He continued to play in the country until 2006, aged 42, in various levels. From 2002 to 2005, he also acted as player-coach for SSVg Velbert.

== Career statistics ==
=== International ===
Appearances and goals by national team and year
National team	Year	Apps	Goals
Poland	1986	3	0
Poland	1987	7	5
Poland	1988	0	0
Poland	1989	1	0
Poland	1990	0	0
Poland	1991	0	0
Poland	1992	0	0
Poland	1993	7	5
Poland	1994	2	0
Total		20	10

=== International goals ===
Scores and results list Poland's goal tally first, score column indicates score after each Leśniak goal.

List of international goals scored by Marek Leśniak
No.	Date	Venue	Opponent	Score	Result	Competition
1	18 March 1987	Stadion Miejski, Rybnik, Poland	Finland	2–0	3–1	Friendly
2	2 September 1987	Zawisza Bydgoszcz Stadium, Bydgoszcz, Poland	Romania	1–0	3–1	Friendly
3	2 September 1987	Zawisza Bydgoszcz Stadium, Bydgoszcz, Poland	Romania	3–0	3–1	Friendly
4	23 September 1987	Polish Army Stadium, Warsaw, Poland	Hungary	3–1	3–2	UEFA Euro 1988 qualifying
5	11 November 1987	Makario Stadium, Nicosia, Cyprus	Cyprus	1–0	1–0	UEFA Euro 1988 qualifying
6	13 April 1993	Stadion Radomiaka Radom, Radom, Poland	Finland	1–0	2–1	Friendly
7	13 April 1993	Stadion Radomiaka Radom, Radom, Poland	Finland	2–0	2–1	Friendly
8	19 May 1993	Stadio Olimpico, Serravalle, San Marino	San Marino	1–0	3–0	1994 FIFA World Cup qualification
9	19 May 1993	Stadio Olimpico, Serravalle, San Marino	San Marino	2–0	3–0	1994 FIFA World Cup qualification
10	17 November 1993	Stadion Miejski, Poznań, Poland	Netherlands	1–1	1–3	1994 FIFA World Cup qualification

== Honours ==
Poland U20

- FIFA World Youth Championship third place: 1983

Individual

- Polish Newcomer of the Year: 1983
- Piłka Nożna Polish Footballer of the Year: 1993
- Ekstraklasa top scorer: 1986–87
