= Duda (footballer, born 1968) =

Brazilian footballer

Personal information
- Full name: Edmilton Conceição dos Santos
- Date of birth: 11 September 1968 (age 58)
- Place of birth: Salvador, Brazil
- Position: Forward

Senior career*
Years	Team	Apps	(Gls)
1989–1993	Bahia		
–	Mimosense		
1996–1997	Kastoria	18	(2)
1999	Fluminense		
2000	Treze		
- * Club domestic league appearances and goals

Edmilton Conceição dos Santos (born 9 November 1968), known as Duda, is a former Brazilian footballer.

Duda played for Bahia in the Campeonato Brasileiro. He also had a spell with Kastoria F.C. in the Greek Alpha Ethniki.

== See also ==
- Football in Brazil
- List of football clubs in Brazil
