= Teodor Wieczorek =

Polish footballer (1923–2009)

Personal information
- Full name: Teodor Stanisław Wieczorek
- Date of birth: 9 November 1923
- Place of birth: Michałkowice, Poland
- Date of death: 26 May 2009 (aged 85)
- Place of death: Chorzów, Poland
- Position: Defender

Senior career*
Years	Team	Apps	(Gls)
- TuS Bytków
1942–1944	Germania Königshütte		
1945–1946	Jedność Michałkowice		
1946–1959	AKS Chorzów		

International career
1949–1953	Poland	10	(0)

Managerial career
- 1955–1957: AKS Chorzów
- 1957–1962: Odra Opole
- 1962–1966: Zagłębie Sosnowiec
- 1966–1969: Ruch Chorzów
- 1969: Odra Opole
- 1969–1970: Zagłębie Wałbrzych
- 1970–1971: Szombierki Bytom
- 1971–1973: ROW Rybnik
- 1973–1975: Górnik Zabrze
- 1975–1977: AKS Chorzów
- 1977: ROW Rybnik
- 1977–1978: Ruch Chorzów
- 1978–1979: Polonia Bytom
- 1982–1983: Piast Gliwice
- * Club domestic league appearances and goals

Teodor Stanisław Wieczorek (9 November 1923 – 26 May 2009) was a Polish footballer who played as a defender. Following retirement, he managed several teams in southern Poland.

He made ten appearances for the Poland national team from 1949 to 1953.

== Honours ==
=== Manager ===
Zagłębie Sosnowiec

- Polish Cup: 1961–62, 1962–63

Ruch Chorzów

- Ekstraklasa: 1967–68
