= Górnik Wałbrzych (football) =

- Full name: Klub Piłkarski Górnik Wałbrzych
- Nickname: Legion Sudety
- Founded: 22 March 1946; 80 years ago
- Ground: 1000-year Anniversary Stadium
- Chairman: Jarosław Borcoń
- Manager: Adrian Mrowiec
- League: Regional league Wałbrzych
- 2025–26: IV liga Lower Silesia, 16th of 18 (relegated)

Górnik Wałbrzych is a Polish men's football team based in Wałbrzych, in southwestern Poland, currently playing in the regional league, in the Wałbrzych group.

== History ==
Górnik Wałbrzych was formed on 22 March 1946 by a group of sports enthusiasts from Lower Silesian Coal Mining Association. On March 31, 1946, the first meeting of the board took place, during which Major Bolesław Rudziński was elected the chairman of Górnik. In August 1946, Kazimierz Nabielec, who used to play for Pogoń Lwów, formed the Autonomous Football Federation in Wałbrzych. In 1947, first local football championship took place, with Górnik-Zamek, as the team was then called, finishing in the last position.

In 1948, Górnik-Zamek merged with the team of Huta Karol, and in 1949, with Chrobry, Julia and Mieszko. As a result, by 1950, a strong football team was created, with financial support of most local coal mines. In 1950, Górnik already played in the third level of Polish football system. Even though it failed to win promotion to the second league, Polish Football Association (PZPN) decided to expand the second division to four groups, with ten teams in each. As a result of this, Górnik was attached to the third group of the second division. The team from Walbrzych won its group in the 1951 season, finishing before Górnik Zabrze, and winning a spot in the Ekstraklasa playoffs. In the playoffs, which featured four teams (Lechia Gdańsk, Wawel Kraków, Gwardia Warszawa), Górnik won only one game, losing five.

In 1953, the PZPN decided to reduce the number of teams in the second division, from 40 to 14. Górnik finished the season in the comfortable 6th position, and in 1954, it also was the 6th team. In 1958, Górnik was relegated from the second division, to remain there until 1963. In 1961, Górnik's U-19 team won silver in Polish championship.

In 1962, the PZPN decided to change the whole system of Polish football championship, introducing the autumn - spring games. As a result, additional playoffs were necessary for Górnik to remain in the second division. The team from Wałbrzych managed to beat MGKS Mikulczyce (later Sparta Zabrze), after an extra, third game, which took place in Opole.

Górnik played in the second division until 1970. Its top player was Henryk Kempny, formerly of Legia Warszawa. In 1967, Gornik finished third, behind Gwardia Warszawa and Odra Opole. In 1968 in Mielec, Górnik won gold in the U-19 Polish Championship. In 1969, the team again finished third in the Second Division, behind Gwardia Warszawa and Cracovia, but in 1970 it was relegated to the Third Division. Górnik remained there for a year, and in 1971/72, it was again close to promotion to the Ekstraklasa. In 1973, the U-19 team, with Włodzimierz Ciołek and Henryk Janikowski, once again won Polish Championship, but in the same year, Górnik was again relegated to the third level.

Under new manager Stanisław Świerk, and with several young talents, Górnik won the third level games, and the playoffs to the second division, beating in the final game Górnik Knurów (Wałbrzych, 16 July 1976).

Logo used after fierce rivals Górnik Wałbrzych and Zagłębie Wałbrzych were merged, a decision which several years later de facto ultimately ended Zagłębie's existence

In the 1977/78 season, Górnik was very close to the promotion to the Ekstraklasa, but failed and finished the games behind GKS Katowice. As a result, several top players left Wałbrzych: Włodzimierz Ciołek went to Stal Mielec, while Marek Pięta went to Widzew Łódź. Stanisław Świerk was replaced by the new manager, Horst Panic.

In the 1982/83 season of the second division, Górnik was by far the best team, winning the promotion four games before the end of the season. With Włodzimierz Ciołek back from Mielec, Gornik was a sensation in the autumn of 1983, finishing the round in the first position. In the spring of 1984, however, Górnik lost several important games, and finished the season in the sixth spot. In 1984–85 Gornik was eight, and in 1985-86, sixth. Its top players at that time were Włodzimierz Ciołek, Leszek Kosowski and Ryszard Spaczyński. In 1986–87, Górnik, without Ciołek, who had been transferred to Switzerland, finished in the 10th spot.

After the 1987–88 season, to avoid relegation Górnik was in the playoffs, managing to beat Zagłębie Lubin. The 1988/89 season was the last one so far for Górnik Wałbrzych in the Ekstraklasa. Under managers Henryk Kempny and Ryszard Mordak, Górnik was relegated. All together, the team from Wałbrzych played 6 seasons in Polish top league, with goal difference 194–246. Górnik won 53 games, tied 56 and lost 73.

The end of communist rule in Poland meant that Górnik lost financial support of local coal mines. A difficult financial situation of sports clubs in Wałbrzych meant that in the early 1990s Zagłębie Wałbrzych merged with its fierce rivals Górnik Wałbrzych much to the shock of both sets of fans after over 40 years of rivalry. The new merged club then became "KP Wałbrzych", then "KP Górnik/Zagłębie Wałbrzych". Matches were played at Zagłębie's stadium but eventually the Zagłębie part was dropped from the name and the rival club de facto ceased to exist, leaving only Górnik. Zagłębie was eventually re-established several years later as a separate club.

== Honours ==
- 6th place in Ekstraklasa - 1983/84, 1985/86
- Polish Cup Semi-Finals - (3x) - 1954/55, 1956/57, 1987/88
- U-19 Polish National Champions - (2x) - 1968, 1973
- U-19 Polish National Runners-up - 1961

== Current squad ==
As of 1 April 2015.

Note: Flags indicate national team as defined under FIFA eligibility rules; some limited exceptions apply. Players may hold more than one non-FIFA nationality.

No.	Pos.	Nation	Player
—	GK	POL	Jaroszewski Damian
—	GK	POL	Kamil Czapla
—	GK	UKR	Leonid Musin
—	GK	POL	Seweryn Derbisz
—	DF	POL	Dariusz Michalak
—	DF	POL	Dominik Radziemski
—	DF	POL	Mateusz Krzymiński
—	DF	POL	Mateusz Sawicki
—	DF	POL	Przemysław Cichocki
—	DF	POL	Bartosz Tyktor
—	DF	POL	Sebastian Surmaj

No.	Pos.	Nation	Player
—	DF	POL	Krystian Stolarczyk
—	DF	POL	Tomasz Wepa
—	MF	POL	Michał Oświęcimka
—	MF	POL	Grzegorz Michalak
—	MF	POL	Damian Migalski
—	MF	POL	Rafał Figiel
—	MF	POL	Dominik Bronisławski
—	FW	POL	Marcin Folc
—	FW	POL	Marcin Orłowski
—	FW	POL	Kamil Śmiałowski
—	FW	POL	Damian Lenkiewicz

== Supporters and rivalries ==
Górnik have a large following considering their relative lack of success, and they call themselves the Sudeten Legion (Legion Sudety). The fans have a long-standing friendship with Polonia Świdnica, and maintain friendly relations with fans of Arka Gdynia, Gwardia Koszalin, Zawisza Bydgoszcz and GKS Tychy.

Their historical rival has always been local neighbour Zagłębie Wałbrzych, with matches between the two being one of the most fiercely contested derbies. However, after the surprising merger of the two clubs and Zagłębie's disappearance, the current biggest rival by far is now Śląsk Wrocław.
