= Gwardia Koszalin =

Polish sports club

- Full name: Klub Sportowy; Gwardia Koszalin
- Founded: 1946; 80 years ago
- Ground: Stanisław Figas Stadium
- Capacity: 950
- Chairman: Jarosław Burzak
- Manager: Michał Mikołajczak & Daniel Wojciechowski
- League: IV liga West Pomerania
- 2023–24: IV liga West Pomerania, 2nd of 18
- Website: www.gwardia-koszalin.pl
Home colours

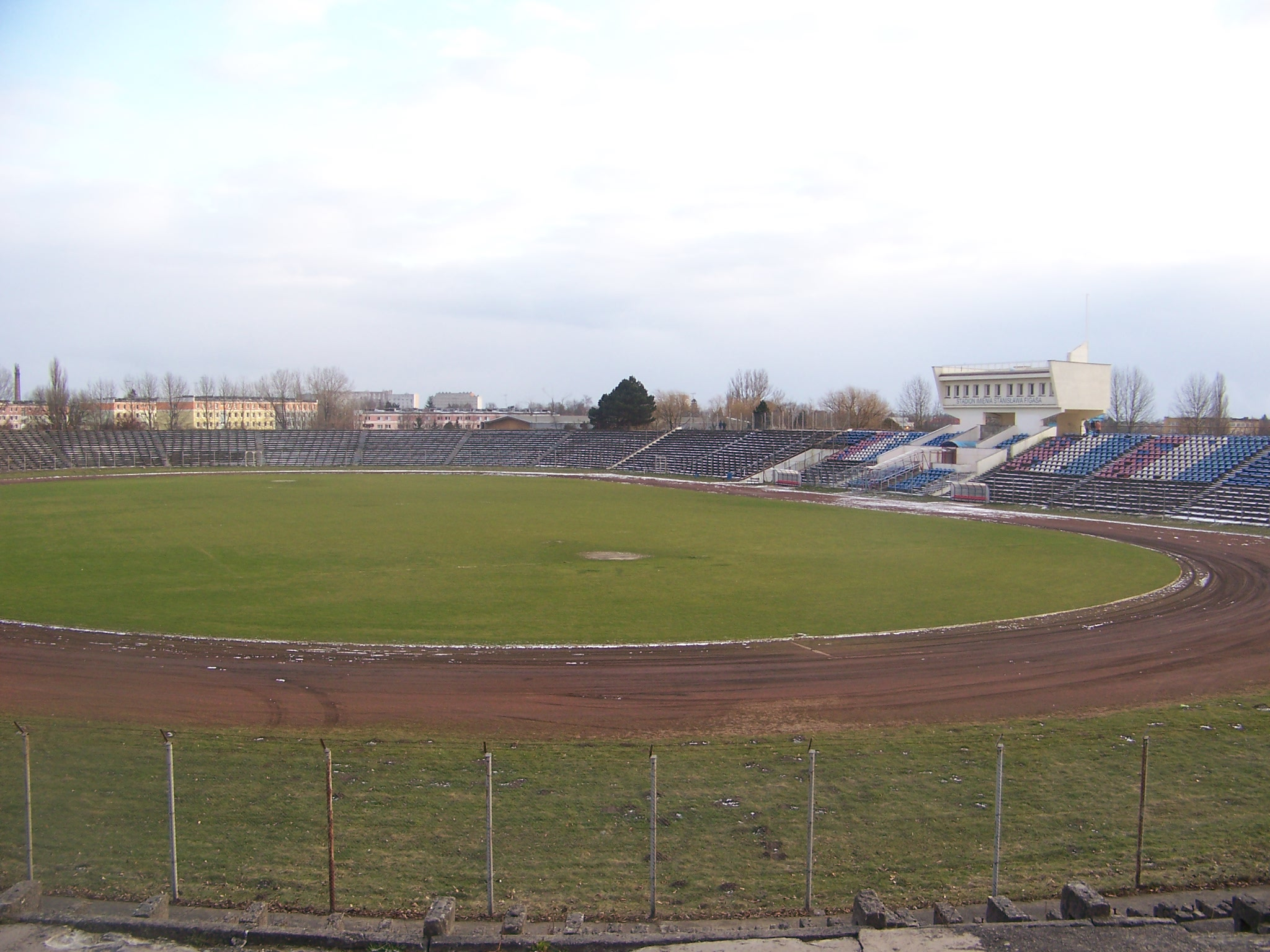
Stadium of Gwardia Koszalin

Gwardia Koszalin is a Polish multisports club, founded in 1946 in the northern city of Koszalin. Besides football, Gwardia supports other departments - handball, boxing, and judo. The departments are autonomous, and have their own, separate budgets.

Gwardia, like all Polish sports organizations bearing that name (Guards in English), was originally supported by the Polish Police. It was founded as Milicyjny Klub Sportowy (Militia's Sports Club), and in 1948 the name was changed to Gwardia. The Club's colours are red, white and blue.

== Football club ==
Gwardia's stadium and clubhouse are located on 34 Falata Street, and stadium's capacity is 950.

Even though Gwardia's football team has never won promotion to the Ekstraklasa, the club raised several notable players, such as Piotr Rzepka, Mirosław Okoński, Miroslaw Trzeciak, Robert Dymkowski, also Sebastian Mila, who was transferred there in his early teens, from a local side Baltyk Koszalin. Gwardia spent some years in Polish Second Division, and the biggest success of its football team was reaching quarter-finals of the Polish Cup, in 1975–76, when, after beating Gornik Zabrze, they lost to Śląsk Wrocław. Up to the 2016–17 season, the team participated in the III liga.

In June 2017, the football team was promoted to II liga.
