= Polish Super Cup =

Superpuchar Polski
- Organiser(s): Polish Football Association (PZPN)
- Founded: 1980; 46 years ago
- Region: Poland
- Teams: 2
- Related competitions: Ekstraklasa (qualifier); Polish Cup (qualifier)
- Current champions: Lech Poznań (7th title)
- Most championships: Lech Poznań (7 titles)
- Broadcaster: TVP Sport

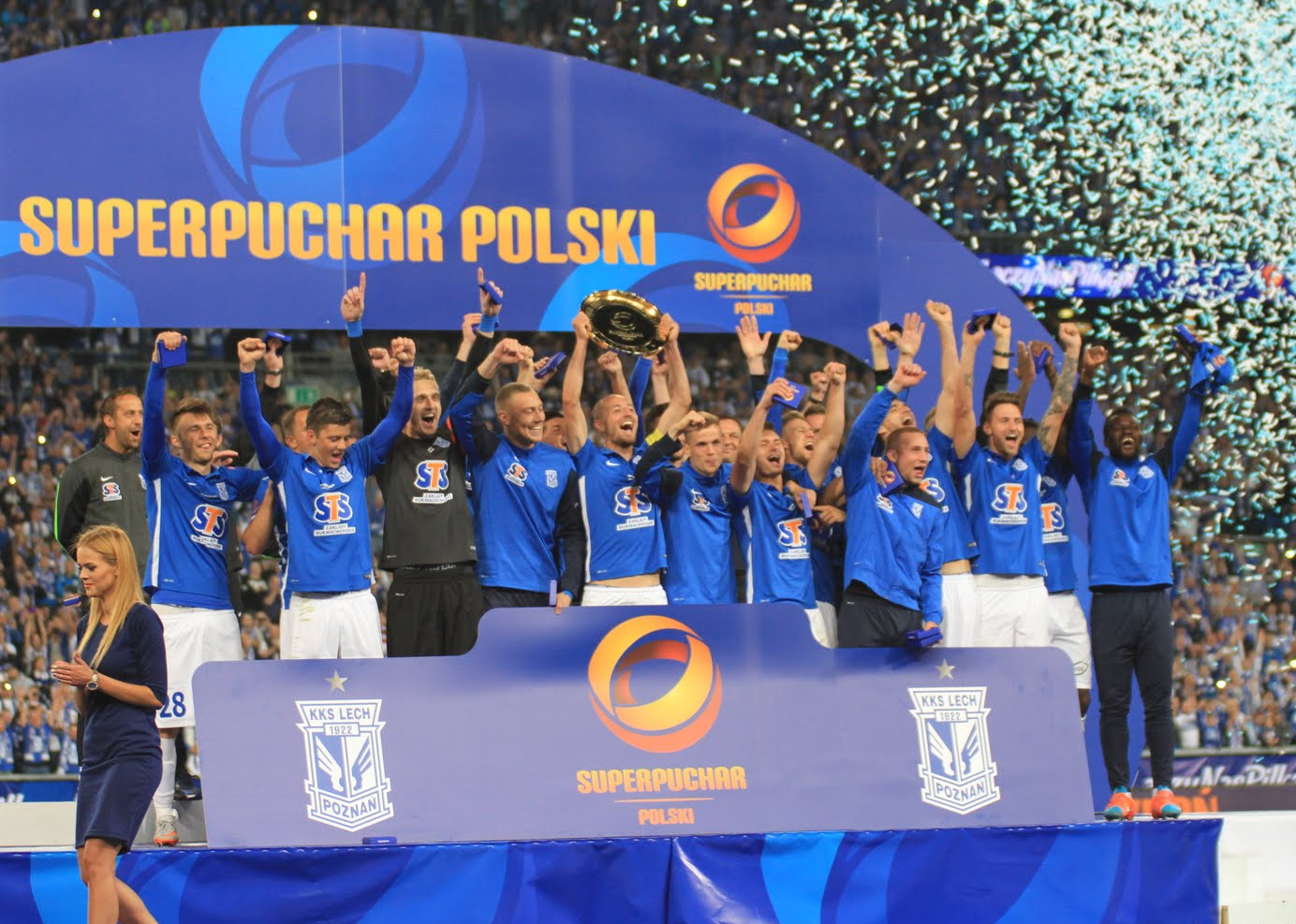
Lech Poznań players celebrating the 2015 Polish Super Cup win

The Polish Super Cup (Polish: Superpuchar Polski, pronounced [supɛrˈpuxar ˈpɔlskʲi]), known as the STS Superpuchar Polski for sponsorship reasons, is an annually held match between the champions of the Ekstraklasa and the Polish Cup winners or, if the Ekstraklasa champions also win the Polish Cup, the Cup's runners-up. As of 2026, the Polish Super Cup has been played 35 times. The most successful club is Lech Poznań, who won the competition 7 times. The most common participant has been Legia Warsaw, as they have played seventeen final games and lost their eight following finals between 2012 and 2021. Unlike the Polish Cup, there is no extra time played in the competition, therefore in case of a draw after regular time, the match goes straight into a penalty shoot-out.

Lech Poznań are the current holders of the trophy.

== Results ==
As of the 2026 final

Year	Host city	Ekstraklasa champions	Score	Polish Cup winners/ Polish Cup runners-up/ Ekstraklasa runners-up
1980	Not played (Note: The match between Legia Warsaw (Polish champion) and Szombierki Bytom (Polish Cup winner) was not organized.)			
1981	Not played due to martial law			
1982	Not played due to martial law			
1983	Gdańsk	Lech Poznań	0–1	Lechia Gdańsk
1984	Not played			
1985	Not played			
1986	Not played			
1987	Białystok	Górnik Zabrze	0–2	Śląsk Wrocław
1988	Piotrków Trybunalski	Górnik Zabrze	2–1	Lech Poznań
1989	Zamość	Ruch Chorzów	0–3	Legia Warsaw
1990	Bydgoszcz	Lech Poznań	3–1	Legia Warsaw
1991	Włocławek	Zagłębie Lubin	1–1 (2–3 p)	GKS Katowice
1992	Lubin	Lech Poznań	4–2	Miedź Legnica
1993	Not played (Note: Not held as PZPN could not decide which team should play as the 1992–93 champions – see 1992–93 Ekstraklasa.)			
1994	Płock	Legia Warsaw	6–4	ŁKS Łódź (Note: Legia Warsaw won the double and played against Polish Cup runners-up.)
1995	Rzeszów	Legia Warsaw	0–1	GKS Katowice (Note: Legia Warsaw won the double and played against Polish Cup runners-up.)
1996	Wodzisław Śląski	Widzew Łódź	0–0 (5–4 p)	Ruch Chorzów
1997	Warsaw	Widzew Łódź	1–2	Legia Warsaw
1998	Grodzisk Wielkopolski	ŁKS Łódź	0–1	Amica Wronki
1999	Ostrowiec Świętokrzyski	Wisła Kraków	0–1	Amica Wronki
2000	Płock	Polonia Warsaw	4–2	Amica Wronki
2001	Starachowice	Wisła Kraków	4–3	Polonia Warsaw
2002	Not played (Note: The match between Legia Warsaw (Polish champion) and Wisła Kraków (Polish Cup winner) was to be played in Suwałki, but was canceled for financial reasons.)			
2003	Not played			
2004	Poznań	Wisła Kraków	2–2 (1–4 p)	Lech Poznań
2005	Not played			
2006	Warsaw	Legia Warsaw	1–2	Wisła Płock
2007	Lubin	Zagłębie Lubin	1–0	GKS Bełchatów (Note: The Polish Cup winners, Dyskobolia Grodzisk Wielkopolski, pulled out. The 2006–07 Ekstraklasa runners-up GKS Bełchatów replaced them.)
2008	Ostrowiec Świętokrzyski	Wisła Kraków	1–2	Legia Warsaw
2009	Lubin	Wisła Kraków	1–1 (3–4 p)	Lech Poznań
2010	Płock	Lech Poznań	0–1	Jagiellonia Białystok
2011	Not played (Note: The match between Wisła Kraków (Polish champion) and Legia Warsaw (Polish Cup winner) was to be played at the National Stadium in Warsaw. The police questioned the readiness of the facility and the delay in laying the turf (among other things, communication problems, poor ability to separate fans of both teams from each other))			
2012	Warsaw	Śląsk Wrocław	1–1 (4–2 p)	Legia Warsaw
2013	Not played (Note: The Polish champion, as well as the winner of the Polish Cup, was Legia Warsaw. It was not decided to play the match in the above-mentioned season.)			
2014	Warsaw	Legia Warsaw	2–3	Zawisza Bydgoszcz
2015	Poznań	Lech Poznań	3–1	Legia Warsaw
2016	Warsaw	Legia Warsaw	1–4	Lech Poznań (Note: Legia Warsaw won the double and played against Polish Cup runners-up.)
2017	Warsaw	Legia Warsaw	1–1 (3–4 p)	Arka Gdynia
2018	Warsaw	Legia Warsaw	2–3	Arka Gdynia (Note: Legia Warsaw won the double and played against Polish Cup runners-up.)
2019	Gliwice	Piast Gliwice	1–3	Lechia Gdańsk
2020	Warsaw	Legia Warsaw	0–0 (4–5 p)	Cracovia
2021	Warsaw	Legia Warsaw	1–1 (3–4 p)	Raków Częstochowa
2022	Poznań	Lech Poznań	0–2	Raków Częstochowa
2023	Częstochowa	Raków Częstochowa	0–0 (5–6 p)	Legia Warsaw
2024	Warsaw	Jagiellonia Białystok	1–0	Wisła Kraków
2025	Poznań	Lech Poznań	1–2	Legia Warsaw
2026	Poznań	Lech Poznań	3–1	Górnik Zabrze

== Performances ==
=== Performance by club ===
Club	Winners	Runners-up	Winning years	Losing years
Lech Poznań	7	5	1990, 1992, 2004, 2009, 2015, 2016, 2026	1983, 1988, 2010, 2022, 2025
Legia Warsaw	6	11	1989, 1994, 1997, 2008, 2023, 2025	1990, 1995, 2006, 2012, 2014, 2015, 2016, 2017, 2018, 2020, 2021
Amica Wronki	2	1	1998, 1999	2000
Raków Częstochowa	2	1	2021, 2022	2023
Lechia Gdańsk	2	–	1983, 2019	–
GKS Katowice	2	–	1991, 1995	–
Śląsk Wrocław	2	–	1987, 2012	–
Arka Gdynia	2	–	2017, 2018	–
Jagiellonia Białystok	2	–	2010, 2024	–
Wisła Kraków	1	5	2001	1999, 2004, 2008, 2009, 2024
Górnik Zabrze	1	2	1988	1987, 2026
Widzew Łódź	1	1	1996	1997
Polonia Warsaw	1	1	2000	2001
Zagłębie Lubin	1	1	2007	1991
Cracovia	1	–	2020	–
Wisła Płock	1	–	2006	–
Zawisza Bydgoszcz	1	–	2014	–
Ruch Chorzów	–	2	–	1989, 1996
ŁKS Łódź	–	2	–	1994, 1998
Miedź Legnica	–	1	–	1992
GKS Bełchatów	–	1	–	2007
Piast Gliwice	–	1	–	2019

=== Performance by qualification ===
Competition	Winners	Runners-up
Polish Cup winners	22	13
Ekstraklasa champions	12	23
Polish Cup runners-up	3	1
Ekstraklasa runners-up	–	1

== See also ==
- Football in Poland
- Poland national football team
- List of Polish football champions
- Polish Cup
