= I liga =

Association football league

1 Liga
- Organising body: PZPN
- Founded: 30 May 1948; 78 years ago 1949–2008 (as II liga); 2008– (as I liga)
- Country: Poland
- Confederation: UEFA
- Number of clubs: 18
- Level on pyramid: 2
- Promotion to: Ekstraklasa
- Relegation to: II liga
- Domestic cup: Polish Cup
- Current champions: Wisła Kraków (2nd title) (2025–26)
- Most championships: Gwardia Warsaw (6 titles)
- Broadcaster(s): TVP Sport
- Sponsor(s): Betclic
- Website: 1liga.org
- Current: 2026–27 I liga

The 1 Liga (Pierwsza liga [ˈpjɛrfʂa ˈliɡa], lit. 'First League'), referred to as the Betclic 1 Liga for sponsorship reasons, is the men's second professional association football division of the Polish football league system, below the Ekstraklasa and above the II liga via promotion/relegation systems. It is run by the Polish Football Association (PZPN) since its inception on 30 May 1948. The league was renamed from Second League (II liga) to First League (I liga) in 2008. It is currently contested by 18 teams; from 2002, all clubs onwards must have a licence, issued by the Association.

Before 1939, there were several plans to create a second, national level of Polish football system, but all failed. Instead, there were regional leagues of most Polish provinces, the so-called A Classes (see also Lower Level Football Leagues in Interwar Poland).

== History ==
=== State Class in Austrian Galicia ===
In 1913 and 1914, the football championship of Austrian Galicia took place. At that time it was called the A Class Championship, with four top teams of the province (Cracovia, Wisła Kraków, Pogoń Lwów and Czarni Lwów). Since there were many more football teams in Galicia, the B Class Championship was made for them. Also, in 1921, already in the Second Polish Republic, there were two levels: winners of regional A Classes played in the national championship, while winners of the B Classes (Cracovia II, Pogoń Lwów II, AZS Warszawa and Union Łódź) had their own tournament. For financial reasons, this idea was abandoned after one year.

=== Second Polish Republic ===
In the Second Polish Republic, there were regional leagues, or A Classes, which were the second level of Polish football system, behind the Ekstraklasa, which was formed in 1927, see Lower Level Football Leagues in Interwar Poland. Since in the late 1930s only two teams were promoted to the Ekstraklasa, and there were as many as fourteen regional champions, there was a complicated system of playoffs. Firstly, winners of neighbouring A Classes played each other, and in the final stage, four teams competed, with two top sides winning the promotion.

=== Formation ===
Second-level league was first created for the 1949 season, and was split into northern and southern sections, each comprising 10 teams. First plans to create this league appeared in 1947. On 14 and 15 February 1948, a meeting of officials of Polish Football Association took place in Warsaw. Officials from Gdańsk promoted the creation of the league, but this idea was opposed by the delegates from the most powerful regions of Polish football: Kraków, Łódź, Upper Silesia and Warsaw. On 30 May 1948, however, the second division was officially approved, with 18 teams in one group. On 19 February 1949, Polish Football Association decided to expand the league to 20 teams, divided into northern and southern groups.

First games of the new, second division, took place on 20 March 1949, with the first goal scored by Jozef Kokot of Naprzód Lipiny, in a game between Naprzód and Błękitni Kielce. First winners of the second division were Garbarnia Kraków (northern group) and Górnik Radlin (southern group): both sides were promoted to the Ekstraklasa. To determine a winner of the 1949 season of the second division, Górnik had to play Garbarnia in three extra games (4–2, 0–2 and 4–3). The top scorer of the first season was Mieczysław Nowak of Garbarnia, with 24 goals. Relegated were the teams of Ognisko Siedlce and PTC Pabianice (northern group), and Błękitni Kielce and Pafawag Wrocław (southern group).

=== 1950s ===
For the 1951 season, the format was changed to four groups, with eight teams in each group.

=== 1970s–2008 ===
For the 1973–74 season, the second level was changed to comprise two sections, split into north and south.

For the 1989–90 season, the league reverted to a single group.

In 2000, the number of teams was limited to 20 sides, then to 18. Champions and runners-up received automatic promotion, while third place teams competed in playoffs. The bottom four teams were relegated.

=== New name ===
From the 2008–09 season, the league was renamed as I liga. The number of teams competing remained at 18. Teams placed 15-18 were automatically relegated to II liga (West or East), while the top two finishers were promoted to the Ekstraklasa. In 2014, II liga merged into one group and these rules were changed – the three worst-ranked teams are relegated, and the 15th I liga club compete in playoffs with the fourth placed II liga team. In 2018, the relegation playoff was removed. Since the 2019–20 season, the top two teams are automatically promoted, whilst teams placed 3–6 compete in a playoff for the final third spot.

== Clubs ==
The following 18 clubs are competing in the I liga during the 2025–26 season.

Location of teams in 2025–26 I liga.
Location of teams in the Metropolis GZM in 2025–26 I liga.

Note: Table lists in alphabetical order.

Team	Location	Venue	Capacity
Chrobry Głogów	Głogów	GOS Stadium	2,817
GKS Tychy	Tychy	Tychy Stadium	15,150
Górnik Łęczna	Łęczna	Górnik Łęczna Stadium	7,464
ŁKS Łódź	Łódź	Władysław Król Stadium	18,029
Miedź Legnica	Legnica	White Eagle Stadium	6,864
Odra Opole	Opole	Itaka Arena	11,600
Pogoń Grodzisk Mazowiecki^{1}	Grodzisk Mazowiecki; Pruszków	Municipal Sports Stadium; MZOS Stadium	1,000; 1,977
Pogoń Siedlce	Siedlce	ROSRRiT Stadium	2,901
Polonia Bytom	Bytom	Polonia Bytom Stadium	2,220
Polonia Warsaw	Warsaw	Kazimierz Sosnkowski Stadium	7,150
Puszcza Niepołomice	Niepołomice	Municipal Stadium	2,118
Ruch Chorzów	Chorzów	Superauto.pl Silesian Stadium^{2}	54,378
Stal Rzeszów	Rzeszów	Stal Stadium	11,547
Stal Mielec	Mielec	Grzegorz Lato Stadium	6,864
Śląsk Wrocław	Wrocław	Tarczyński Arena Wrocław	42,771
Wieczysta Kraków^{3}	Sosnowiec; Kraków	ArcelorMittal Park; Henryk Reyman Stadium	11,600; 33,326
Wisła Kraków	Kraków	Henryk Reyman Stadium	33,326
Znicz Pruszków	Pruszków	MZOS Stadium	1,977

1. Due to accomodationg Municipal Sports Stadium to I liga regulations, Pogoń Grodzisk Mazowiecki will host their matches in Pruszków starting from matchday 3.
2. Since 28 October 2023, Ruch Chorzów host their games at the Silesian Stadium. It remains unclear if they will stay there or they will move to Ruch Chorzów Stadium.
3. Due to the fact Wieczysta Stadium doesn't meet the I liga regulations, Wieczysta Kraków will play their first half of matches in Sosnowiec and will return to Kraków to play at Wisła Kraków's stadium after winter break.

== Champions of the Polish second level ==
- 1949: Górnik Radlin, Garbarnia Kraków
- 1950: Gwardia Szczecin, Ogniwo Bytom
- 1951: Budowlani Gdańsk, OWKS Kraków
- 1952: Gwardia Warsaw, Budowlani Opole
- 1953: Gwardia Bydgoszcz
- 1954: Stal Sosnowiec
- 1955: Budowlani Opole
- 1956: Polonia Bytom
- 1957: Polonia Bydgoszcz, Cracovia
- 1958: Pogoń Szczecin, Górnik Radlin
- 1959: Odra Opole, Stal Sosnowiec
- 1960: Lech Poznań, Stal Mielec
- 1961: Gwardia Warsaw
- 1962: Stal Rzeszów, Pogoń Szczecin
- 1962–63: Szombierki Bytom
- 1963–64: Śląsk Wrocław
- 1964–65: Wisła Kraków
- 1965–66: Cracovia
- 1966–67: Gwardia Warsaw
- 1967–68: Zagłębie Wałbrzych
- 1968–69: Gwardia Warsaw
- 1969–70: ROW Rybnik
- 1970–71: Odra Opole
- 1971–72: ROW Rybnik
- 1972–73: Szombierki Bytom
- 1973–74: Arka Gdynia, GKS Tychy
- 1974–75: Widzew Łódź, Stal Rzeszów
- 1975–76: Arka Gdynia, Odra Opole
- 1976–77: Zawisza Bydgoszcz, Polonia Bytom
- 1977–78: Gwardia Warsaw, GKS Katowice
- 1978–79: Zawisza Bydgoszcz, Górnik Zabrze
- 1979–80: Bałtyk Gdynia, Motor Lublin
- 1980–81: Pogoń Szczecin, Gwardia Warsaw
- 1981–82: GKS Katowice, Cracovia
- 1982–83: Górnik Wałbrzych, Motor Lublin
- 1983–84: Lechia Gdańsk, Radomiak Radom
- 1984–85: Zagłębie Lubin, Stal Mielec
- 1985–86: Olimpia Poznań, Polonia Bytom
- 1986–87: Szombierki Bytom, Jagiellonia Białystok
- 1987–88: Ruch Chorzów, Stal Mielec
- 1988–89: Zagłębie Lubin, Zagłębie Sosnowiec
- 1989–90: Hutnik Kraków
- 1990–91: Stal Stalowa Wola
- 1991–92: Pogoń Szczecin, Siarka Tarnobrzeg
- 1992–93: Warta Poznań, Polonia Warsaw
- 1993–94: Raków Częstochowa, Stomil Olsztyn
- 1994–95: Śląsk Wrocław, GKS Bełchatów
- 1995–96: Odra Wodzisław, Polonia Warsaw
- 1996–97: Dyskobolia Grodzisk Wlkp., Petrochemia Płock
- 1997–98: Ruch Radzionków, GKS Bełchatów
- 1998–99: Dyskobolia Grodzisk Wlkp., Petrochemia Płock
- 1999–00: Śląsk Wrocław
- 2000–01: RKS Radomsko
- 2001–02: Lech Poznań
- 2002–03: Górnik Polkowice
- 2003–04: Pogoń Szczecin
- 2004–05: Korona Kielce
- 2005–06: Widzew Łódź
- 2006–07: Ruch Chorzów
- 2007–08: Lechia Gdańsk
- 2008–09: Widzew Łódź
- 2009–10: Widzew Łódź
- 2010–11: ŁKS Łódź
- 2011–12: Piast Gliwice
- 2012–13: Zawisza Bydgoszcz
- 2013–14: GKS Bełchatów
- 2014–15: Zagłębie Lubin
- 2015–16: Arka Gdynia
- 2016–17: Sandecja Nowy Sącz
- 2017–18: Miedź Legnica
- 2018–19: Raków Częstochowa
- 2019–20: Stal Mielec
- 2020–21: Radomiak Radom
- 2021–22: Miedź Legnica
- 2022–23: ŁKS Łódź
- 2023–24: Lechia Gdańsk
- 2024–25: Arka Gdynia
- 2025–26: Wisła Kraków

== See also ==
- Lower Level Football Leagues in Interwar Poland
