= 2000–01 Greek Football Cup =

2000–01 Greek Cup
Tournament details
- Country: Greece
- Teams: 50

Final positions
- Champions: PAOK (3rd title)
- Runners-up: Olympiacos

Tournament statistics
- Matches played: 270
- Goals scored: 815 (3.02 per match)
- Top goal scorer(s): Sotiris Konstantinidis; Giovanni (11 goals each)

The 2000–01 Greek Football Cup was the 59th edition of the Greek Football Cup.

== Tournament details ==
A total of 50 teams participated in the competition, 16 from Alpha Ethniki, 16 from Beta, and 18 from Gamma. It was held in 6 rounds, including the final. An additional round was held between First and Second, with 2 matches, in order that the teams who progress would be 16. The Group stage featured 8 groups with 6 teams each, while 2 teams qualified without matches.

For the first time, there were two-leg (home and away) matches in the group stage, thus each team played 10 games. Because the tournament began very early in the summer, in a period where teams should play preparation friendlies, the HFF allowed at the 5 first matches a maximum of 7 substitutions, something unusual in Greece, for matches of an official competition.

After the group stage, there were very interesting confrontations, after drawing elected "strong" pairs. In the round of 16, Olympiacos eliminated AEK Athens with two wins. The first leg in Nikos Goumas Stadium was awarded to Olympiacos 2–0 in an eventful match that was abandoned against AEK Athens and while the scoreline was 1–1 at the time. In the second leg, at Olympic Stadium, Olympiacos' home ground then, they shattered AEK Athens 6–1. In the same round, in derby of Thessaloniki between PAOK and Aris, the black and whites were qualified with a 1–1 away draw and a 2–0 home victory. Remarkable in this round was also the qualification of Panathinaikos against Panionios with a 7–2 second leg demolition, while the first leg ended with a 1–0 win of Panionios.

In the quarter-finals followed the derby between Olympiacos and Panathinaikos. First leg ended 1–1 in Athens Olympic Stadium, while in the second leg the "reds" triumphed by 4–1 in Leoforos Alexandras Stadium against their arch-rivals. More exciting were the semi-finals between Olympiacos and Iraklis. Olympiacos with two victories, 1–0 away and 5–4 at home (in an impressive game where 10 minutes before the end the scoreline was 3–4), qualified for the final.

The final was held in Nikos Goumas Stadium, Athens on 12 May 2001. A draw was preceded on 19 April to determine in which stadium and city the final would be hosted (Nikos Goumas Stadium at Athens or Kaftanzoglio Stadium at Thessaloniki). Olympiacos faced PAOK, 9 years after their last conflict in a cup final and for a 7th clash in total. Several days before the game, Olympiacos president Sokratis Kokkalis made a memorable statement using a Greek expression that Olympiacos would lose the upcoming final only if the devil would break his leg (meaning that it was almost impossible to lose). However, PAOK easily won the match 4–2 with an impressive performance and earned the trophy 27 years after their last success, in the same stadium against the same opponent. During the awarding ceremony, former goalkeeper of PAOK Mladen Furtula and then member of the coaching staff whispered to Sokratis Kokkalis that the devil did break his leg that day and Kokkalis responded with a laugh. The manager of PAOK, Dušan Bajević became the first in history to win the trophy with three different teams, as je also won it with AEK Athens in 1996 and Olympiacos in 1999.

== Calendar ==
Round	Date(s)	Fixtures	Clubs	New entries
Group stage	5–11, 13, 14, 16, 17, 19–25, 27, 28, 30 August, 2, 3, 6, 9–11, September, 4, 5, 8, 9 October, 29 November & 13 December 2000	239	50 → 18	48
Additional Round	20 December 2000	2	18 → 16	2
Round of 16	10, 16, 17, 24, 30, 31 January 2001	16	16 → 8	none
Quarter-finals	7, 21 February & 7, 14, 21 March 2001	8	8 → 4	none
Semi-finals	4, 11 April 2001	4	4 → 2	none
Final	12 May 2001	1	2 → 1	none

== Group stage ==
The teams play each other home and away.

- Chalkidona and Apollon Krya Vrysi qualified to the Additional Round without matches.

=== Group 1 ===
Pos	Team	Pld	W	D	L	GF	GA	GD	Pts	Qualification	ARIS	PNS	AKR	LEO	KLM	LYK
1	Aris	10	6	3	1	16	9	+7	21	Round of 16		2–0	3–3	2–1	1–0	1–0
2	Panserraikos	10	5	3	2	16	8	+8	18	Round of 16	0–0		2–1	4–1	1–0	4–1
3	Akratitos	10	4	3	3	16	14	+2	15		1–2	1–1		0–0	1–2	2–1
4	Leonidio	10	3	3	4	10	15	−5	12		2–1	1–0	1–2		2–2	1–0
5	Kalamata	10	3	2	5	13	13	0	11		1–1	1–2	0–1	4–1		2–1
6	ILTEX Lykoi	10	1	2	7	8	20	−12	5		1–3	0–0	2–4	0–0	2–1	

Source: epo.gr
5 August 2000
13:00 EEST

Akratitos	0–0	Leonidio
	Report (page 1)

Ano Liosia Municipal Stadium, Ano Liosia
5 August 2000
13:00 EEST

Panserraikos	4–1	ILTEX Lykoi
Iliopoulos 7'; Ademar 49', 90'; Tsifoutis 72'	Report (page 1)	P. Pappas 52'

Serres Municipal Stadium, Serres
7 August 2000
13:00 EEST

Kalamata	1–1	Aris
Soares 25'	Report (page 1)	Liolidis 17'

Kalamata Municipal Stadium, Kalamata

9 August 2000
13:00 EEST

ILTEX Lykoi	2–4	Akratitos
Podas 42'; Andreadis 70'	Report (page 2)	Topuzov 56', 87'; Đokić 89'; Togias 90'

Stelios Iliadis Stadium, Thessaloniki
10 August 2000
13:00 EEST

Leonidio	2–2	Kalamata
Klokidis 35', 60'	Report (page 1-2)	Kavazis 3'; Soares 86'

Leonidio Municipal Stadium, Leonidio
10 August 2000
13:00 EEST

Aris	2–0	Panserraikos
Kyparissis 80'; Christodoulou 90'	Report (page 2)

Kleanthis Vikelidis Stadium, Thessaloniki

13 August 2000
13:00 EEST

Leonidio	1–0	ILTEX Lykoi
Spasić 70'	Report (page 2)

Leonidio Municipal Stadium, Leonidio
13 August 2000
13:00 EEST

Aris	3–3	Akratitos
Liolidis 1', 28'; Papadopoulos 59'	Report (page 2)	Velentzas 11'; Massara 42'; Topuzov 62'

Kleanthis Vikelidis Stadium, Thessaloniki
August 2000
13:00 EEST

Kalamata	1–2	Panserraikos
Anastasakos 68'	Report (page 2-3)	Iliopoulos 1', 28'; Tsifoutis 40'

Kalamata Municipal Stadium, Kalamata

19 August 2000
13:00 EEST

ILTEX Lykoi	1–3	Aris
Fidanis 55'	Report (page 3)	Liolidis 35', 62'; Papadopoulos 70'

Stelios Iliadis Stadium, Thessaloniki
20 August 2000
13:00 EEST

Panserraikos	4–1	Leonidio
Tsifoutis 28'; Macheroudis 63'; Ademar 75', 80'	Report (page 3)	Klokidis 32'

Serres Municipal Stadium, Serres
21 August 2000
13:00 EEST

Akratitos	1–2	Kalamata
Đokić 75'	Report (page 3)	Boateng 52'; Soares 71'

Ano Liosia Municipal Stadium, Ano Liosia

23 August 2000
13:00 EEST

Aris	2–1	Leonidio
Charisteas 35'; Agathokleous 42'	Report (page 3)	De Sousa 82'

Kleanthis Vikelidis Stadium, Thessaloniki
24 August 2000
13:00 EEST

Kalamata	2–1	ILTEX Lykoi
Belevonis 20'; Boateng 26'	Report (page 3-4)	P. Pappas 60'

Kalamata Municipal Stadium, Kalamata
24 August 2000
13:00 EEST

Panserraikos	2–1	Akratitos
Dentsas 19'; Ademar 38'	Report (page 4)	Velentzas 40'

Serres Municipal Stadium, Serres

27 August 2000
13:00 EEST

Aris	1–0	Kalamata
Charisteas 55'	Report (page 4)

Kleanthis Vikelidis Stadium, Thessaloniki
30 August 2000
13:00 EEST

Leonidio	1–2	Akratitos
De Sousa 8'	Report (page 4)	Velentzas 58'; Kolliakos 60'

Leonidio Municipal Stadium, Leonidio
30 August 2000
13:00 EEST

ILTEX Lykoi	0–0	Panserraikos
	Report (page 3)

Stelios Iliadis Stadium, Thessaloniki

3 September 2000
13:00 EEST

Akratitos	2–1	ILTEX Lykoi
Kolliakos 30'; Velentzas 50'	Report (page 4-5)	P. Pappas 84'

Ano Liosia Municipal Stadium, Ano Liosia
6 September 2000
13:00 EEST

Kalamata	4–1	Leonidio
Frantzeskos 16'; Soares 38'; Troupkos 56', 77'	Report (page 3)	De Sousa 67'

Kalamata Municipal Stadium, Kalamata
6 September 2000
13:00 EEST

Panserraikos	0–0	Aris
	Report (page 5)

Serres Municipal Stadium, Serres

10 September 2000
13:00 EEST

ILTEX Lykoi	0–0	Leonidio
	Report (page 5)

Stelios Iliadis Stadium, Thessaloniki
10 September 2000
13:00 EEST

Panserraikos	1–0	Kalamata
Iliopoulos 8'	Report (page 5)

Serres Municipal Stadium, Serres
11 September 2000
13:00 EEST

Akratitos	1–2	Aris
D. Papadopoulos 90'	Report (page 5)	Agathokleous 48', 85'

Ano Liosia Municipal Stadium, Ano Liosia

4 October 2000
13:00 EEST

Aris	1–0	ILTEX Lykoi
Kyzeridis 77' (pen.)	Report (page 5)

Kleanthis Vikelidis Stadium, Thessaloniki
4 October 2000
13:00 EEST

Kalamata	0–1	Akratitos
	Report (page 5-6)	Topuzov 90' (pen.)

Kalamata Municipal Stadium, Kalamata
4 October 2000
13:00 EEST

Leonidio	1–0	Panserraikos
Kiourkos 72'	Report (page 6)

Leonidio Municipal Stadium, Leonidio

8 October 2000
13:00 EEST

Leonidio	2–1	Aris
Kiourkos 20'; Klokidis 90' (pen.)	Report (page 6)	Ba 56'

Leonidio Municipal Stadium, Leonidio
8 October 2000
13:00 EEST

Akratitos	1–1	Panserraikos
Dimos 90'	Report (page 6)	Macheroudis 22'

Ano Liosia Municipal Stadium, Ano Liosia
29 November 2000
13:00 EET

ILTEX Lykoi	2–1	Kalamata
Mitsopoulos 5'; Kourentzis 38' (o.g.)	Report (page 6)	Kalantzis 33'

Stelios Iliadis Stadium, Thessaloniki

=== Group 2 ===
Pos	Team	Pld	W	D	L	GF	GA	GD	Pts	Qualification	PNI	ION	PNG	LAM	MAR	KLT
1	Paniliakos	10	6	4	0	14	1	+13	22	Additional Round		4–0	2–0	0–0	1–0	2–0
2	Ionikos	10	5	3	2	18	10	+8	18	Round of 16	0–1		3–0	3–0	4–1	3–0
3	Panegialios	10	3	2	5	10	13	−3	11		0–3	1–1		0–0	4–0	3–1
4	Lamia	10	2	4	4	7	14	−7	10		1–1	1–2	0–2		3–2	1–0
5	Marko	10	2	4	4	11	17	−6	10		0–0	2–2	2–0	0–0		1–1
6	Kallithea	10	2	3	5	9	14	−5	9		0–0	0–0	1–0	4–1	2–3	

Source: epo.gr
6 August 2000
13:00 EEST

Paniliakos	1–0	Marko
Nebegleras 28'	Report (page 7)

Pyrgos Stadium, Pyrgos
6 August 2000
13:00 EEST

Kallithea	1–0	Panegialios
Vlachos 88'	Report (page 7)

Grigoris Lamprakis Stadium, Kallithea
6 August 2000
13:00 EEST

Ionikos	3–0	Lamia
Muchotrigo 9'; Afash 32'; Vilanakis 37'	Report (page 7)

Neapoli Stadium, Piraeus

9 August 2000
13:00 EEST

Lamia	1–1	Paniliakos
Prekates 39'	Report (page 7-8)	Almanidis 41'

Lamia Municipal Stadium, Lamia
9 August 2000
13:00 EEST

Panegialios	1–1	Ionikos
Karapitsos 52'	Report (page 8)	Vlachos 13'

Aigio National Stadium, Aigio
10 August 2000
13:00 EEST

Marko	1–1	Kallithea
Mesolongis 29'	Report (page 7)	Papakonstantinou 45' (o.g.)

Municipal Stadium of Markopoulo, Markopoulo

13 August 2000
13:00 EEST

Marko	0–0	Lamia
	Report (page 8)

Municipal Stadium of Markopoulo, Markopoulo
13 August 2000
13:00 EEST

Panegialios	0–3	Paniliakos
	Report (page 8)	Giannakidis 11'; Almanidis 40'; Luciano 88' (o.g.)

Aigio National Stadium, Aigio
16 August 2000
13:00 EEST

Kallithea	0–0	Ionikos
	Report (page 8)

Grigoris Lamprakis Stadium, Kallithea

19 August 2000
13:00 EEST

Paniliakos	2–0	Kallithea
Almanidis 32'; Taralidis 80'	Report (page 8-9)

Pyrgos Stadium, Pyrgos
19 August 2000
13:00 EEST

Ionikos	4–1	Marko
Brewster 26'; Vilanakis 34'; Afash 40'; Curbelo 45'	Report (page 9)	Kaffes 24'

Neapoli Stadium, Piraeus
20 August 2000
13:00 EEST

Lamia	0–2	Panegialios
	Report (page 8)	Karapitsos 78', 84'

Lamia Municipal Stadium, Lamia

22 August 2000
13:00 EEST

Ionikos	0–1	Paniliakos
	Report (page 9)	Nousias 90'

Neapoli Stadium, Piraeus
23 August 2000
13:00 EEST

Panegialios	4–0	Marko
Koça 15'; Poulios 36'; Karapitsos 56'; Drakopoulos 70'	Report (page 9)

Aigio National Stadium, Aigio
23 August 2000
13:00 EEST

Kallithea	4–1	Lamia
Tsimplidis 23'; T. Papadopoulos 40'; Savvidis 48'; Zacharopoulos 70'	Report (page 9)	Engonidis 88'

Grigoris Lamprakis Stadium, Kallithea

27 August 2000
13:00 EEST

Marko	0–0	Paniliakos
	Report (page 9-10)

Municipal Stadium of Markopoulo, Markopoulo
30 August 2000
13:00 EEST

Panegialios	3–1	Kallithea
Karapitsos 36'; Drakopoulos 68', 80'	Report (page 10)	Vlachos 55'

Aigio National Stadium, Aigio
30 August 2000
13:00 EEST

Lamia	1–2	Ionikos
Prekates 42'	Report (page 10)	Vilanakis 49'; Mikes 77'

Lamia Municipal Stadium, Lamia

3 September 2000
13:00 EEST

Kallithea	2–3	Marko
Tsimplidis 18'; Petković 45'	Report (page 10)	Tsirtsikos 57'; Stavrou 58'; Tahiri 75'

Grigoris Lamprakis Stadium, Kallithea
3 September 2000
13:00 EEST

Ionikos	3–0	Panegialios
Kobayashi 21'; Curbelo 61', 70'	Report (page 10)

Neapoli Stadium, Piraeus
6 September 2000
13:00 EEST

Paniliakos	0–0	Lamia
	Report (page 10)

Pyrgos Stadium, Pyrgos

10 September 2000
13:00 EEST

Lamia	3–2	Marko
Tsioukas 55', 67'; C. Papadopoulos 77'	Report (page 11)	Chrysafis 20'; Lazorík 30'

Lamia Municipal Stadium, Lamia
10 September 2000
13:00 EEST

Paniliakos	2–0	Panegialios
Taralidis 49' (pen.); Pisz 80'	Report (page 11)

Pyrgos Stadium, Pyrgos
10 September 2000
13:00 EEST

Ionikos	3–0	Kallithea
Vilanakis 10', 34'; Afash 86'	Report (page 11)

Neapoli Stadium, Piraeus

4 October 2000
13:00 EEST

Panegialios	0–0	Lamia
	Report (page 11)

Aigio National Stadium, Aigio
4 October 2000
13:00 EEST

Kallithea	0–0	Paniliakos
	Report (page 11)

Grigoris Lamprakis Stadium, Kallithea
4 October 2000
13:00 EEST

Marko	2–2	Ionikos
Stavrou 16'; Lazorík 63'	Report (page 11)	Piaggio 80'; Markomichalis 82'

Municipal Stadium of Markopoulo, Markopoulo

8 October 2000
13:00 EEST

Marko	2–0	Panegialios
Mesolongis 43'; Chrysafis 54'	Report (page 11-12)

Municipal Stadium of Markopoulo, Markopoulo
8 October 2000
13:00 EEST

Lamia	1–0	Kallithea
Tsioukas 25'	Report (page 12)

Lamia Municipal Stadium, Lamia
8 October 2000
13:00 EEST

Paniliakos	4–0	Ionikos
Mandra 4'; Ziakas 20', 43'; Ledesma 28' (o.g.)	Report (page 12)

Pyrgos Stadium, Pyrgos

=== Group 3 ===
Pos	Team	Pld	W	D	L	GF	GA	GD	Pts	Qualification	IRA	APS	ATH	AGN	ACH	PIE
1	Iraklis	10	8	1	1	27	6	+21	25	Round of 16		2–0	3–0	6–0	3–1	2–0
2	Apollon Athens	10	5	3	2	14	9	+5	18	Round of 16	0–2		1–0	0–0	3–0	1–0
3	Athinaikos	10	5	3	2	15	12	+3	18		2–2	3–3		1–0	1–0	3–1
4	Agios Nikolaos	10	3	1	6	6	16	−10	10		1–2	0–1	0–2		1–0	1–0
5	Acharnaikos	10	2	1	7	12	15	−3	7		2–1	0–0	1–2	1–2		6–0
6	Pierikos	10	2	1	7	9	25	−16	7		0–4	2–5	1–1	3–1	2–1	

Source: epo.gr
5 August 2000
13:00 EEST

Apollon Athens	3–0	Acharnaikos
Skarmoutsos 11'; Karanikolas 80'; Labriakos 90'	Report (page 12)

Rizoupoli Stadium, Rizoupoli
5 August 2000
13:00 EEST

Agios Nikolaos	0–2	Athinaikos
	Report (page 12-13)	Papandreou 62'; Buyse 76'

Agios Nikolaos Municipal Stadium, Agios Nikolaos
5 August 2000
13:00 EEST

Iraklis	2–0	Pierikos
Konstantinou 39'; Fofonka 55'	Report (page 13)

Kaftanzoglio Stadium, Thessaloniki

8 August 2000
13:00 EEST

Acharnaikos	1–2	Agios Nikolaos
Rousopoulos 72'	Report (page 13)	Karvelas 55'; Andriadakis 44'

Acharnes Stadium, Acharnes
8 August 2000
13:00 EEST

Athinaikos	2–2	Iraklis
Zafirakis 28'; Papandreou 43'	Report (page 13)	Stoltidis 23'; Konstantinou 48'

Vyronas National Stadium, Vyronas
10 August 2000
13:00 EEST

Pierikos	2–5	Apollon Athens
Mitrović 26'; Papazisis 89'	Report (page 13)	Papadimitriou 50'; Labriakos 52', 60'; Skarmoutsos 75', 90'

Katerini Stadium, Katerini

13 August 2000
13:00 EEST

Acharnaikos	6–0	Pierikos
Gino 20', 49'; Vitevis 42', 60'; Rousopoulos 75'; Papastathopoulos 90'	Report (page 13-14)

Acharnes Stadium, Acharnes
13 August 2000
13:00 EEST

Athinaikos	3–3	Apollon Athens
Touré 8'; Mitić 13'; Zafirakis 32'	Report (page 14)	Diamantis 34'; Skarmoutsos 53'; Bekiaris 73'

Vyronas National Stadium, Vyronas
13 August 2000
13:00 EEST

Agios Nikolaos	1–2	Iraklis
Spyridakis 32'	Report (page 14)	Stoltidis 86'; Sapountzis 87'

Agios Nikolaos Municipal Stadium, Agios Nikolaos

20 August 2000
13:00 EEST

Pierikos	1–1	Athinaikos
Theodosiadis 90'	Report (page 14)	Buyse 65'

Katerini Stadium, Katerini
20 August 2000
13:00 EEST

Apollon Athens	0–0	Agios Nikolaos
	Report (page 14)

Rizoupoli Stadium, Rizoupoli
21 August 2000
13:00 EEST

Iraklis	3–1	Acharnaikos
Konstantinou 31', 52'; Milojević 70'	Report (page 14)	Dauti 30'

Kaftanzoglio Stadium, Thessaloniki

24 August 2000
13:00 EEST

Agios Nikolaos	1–0	Pierikos
Kartalis 86'	Report (page 15)

Agios Nikolaos Municipal Stadium, Agios Nikolaos
24 August 2000
13:00 EEST

Iraklis	2–0	Apollon Athens
Dimas 39' (o.g.); Fofonka 73'	Report (page 15)

Kaftanzoglio Stadium, Thessaloniki
25 August 2000
13:00 EEST

Athinaikos	1–0	Acharnaikos
Papandreou 58'	Report (page 15)

Vyronas National Stadium, Vyronas

28 August 2000
13:00 EEST

Pierikos	0–4	Iraklis
	Report (page 15-16)	Konstantinou 22', 59'; Sapountzis 25'; Xenidis 64'

Katerini Stadium, Katerini
30 August 2000
13:00 EEST

Acharnaikos	0–0	Apollon Athens
	Report (page 15)

Acharnes Stadium, Acharnes
30 August 2000
13:00 EEST

Athinaikos	1–0	Agios Nikolaos
Zavadias 72'	Report (page 15)

Vyronas National Stadium, Vyronas

3 September 2000
13:00 EEST

Agios Nikolaos	1–0	Acharnaikos
Andriadakis 41'	Report (page 16)

Agios Nikolaos Municipal Stadium, Agios Nikolaos
3 September 2000
13:00 EEST

Apollon Athens	1–0	Pierikos
Bekiaris 89'	Report (page 16)

Rizoupoli Stadium, Rizoupoli
3 September 2000
13:00 EEST

Iraklis	3–0	Athinaikos
Sapountzis 24'; Milojević 65'; Fofonka 75'	Report (page 16)

Kaftanzoglio Stadium, Thessaloniki

9 September 2000
13:00 EEST

Iraklis	6–0	Agios Nikolaos
Fofonka 18', 44'; Konstantinou 41'; Niestroj 54', 90'; Gojković 78'	Report (page 16-17)

Kaftanzoglio Stadium, Thessaloniki
10 September 2000
13:00 EEST

Pierikos	2–1	Acharnaikos
Velonis 2'; Mitrović 3'	Report (page 16)	Gino 22'

Katerini Stadium, Katerini
10 September 2000
13:00 EEST

Apollon Athens	1–0	Athinaikos
Labriakos 27'	Report (page 16)

Rizoupoli Stadium, Rizoupoli

4 October 2000
13:00 EEST

Athinaikos	3–1	Pierikos
Papandreou 18'; Zavadias 32'; Touré 47'	Report (page 17)	Mitrović 69' (pen.)

Vyronas National Stadium, Vyronas
4 October 2000
13:00 EEST

Agios Nikolaos	0–1	Apollon Athens
	Report (page 17)	Skarmoutsos 89'

Agios Nikolaos Municipal Stadium, Agios Nikolaos
5 October 2000
13:00 EEST

Acharnaikos	2–1	Iraklis
Gino 51'; Vitevis 75'	Report (page 17)	Sapountzis 45' (pen.)

Acharnes Stadium, Acharnes

8 October 2000
13:00 EEST

Pierikos	3–1	Agios Nikolaos
Manikas 5', 90'; Mitrović 70'	Report (page 17)

Katerini Stadium, Katerini
9 October 2000
13:00 EEST

Acharnaikos	1–2	Athinaikos
Dauti 82'	Report (page 17)	Psarris 45'; Simmons 90'

Acharnes Stadium, Acharnes
29 November 2000
13:00 EET

Apollon Athens	0–2	Iraklis
	Report (page 17-18)	Moutsios 9'; Stefanidis 88'

Rizoupoli Stadium, Rizoupoli

=== Group 4 ===
Pos	Team	Pld	W	D	L	GF	GA	GD	Pts	Qualification	PAOK	PNC	KAV	ATR	NAF	AMP
1	PAOK	10	9	1	0	35	10	+25	28	Round of 16		2–0	3–1	1–0	4–0	6–1
2	Panachaiki	10	5	2	3	28	16	+12	17	Round of 16	2–3		4–1	1–2	2–2	6–0
3	Kavala	10	4	2	4	17	22	−5	14		1–5	2–6		3–1	1–0	4–0
4	Atromitos	10	3	2	5	15	17	−2	11		1–2	0–2	1–1		2–0	4–0
5	Nafpaktiakos Asteras	10	2	4	4	15	18	−3	10		3–3	2–2	1–1	5–2		0–1
6	A.S. Ampelokipoi	10	1	1	8	6	33	−27	4		1–6	1–2	1–2	1–1	0–2	

Source: epo.gr

7 August 2000
20:30 EEST

PAOK	1–0	Atromitos
Frousos 80'	Report (page 18)

Kalamaria Stadium, Thessaloniki
Attendance: 4,552
Referee: Makis Efthimiadis (Drama)
6 August 2000
13:00 EEST

Panachaiki	4–1	Kavala
Katsouranis 33', 35'; Solakis 69'; Vukčević 78'	Report (page 18)	Manafis 86'

Kostas Davourlis Stadium, Patras
5 August 2000
13:00 EEST

Nafpaktiakos Asteras	0–1	A.S. Ampelokipoi
	Report (page 18)	Dotsis 60'

Papacharalambeio National Stadium, Nafpaktos

10 August 2000
13:00 EEST

Atromitos	0–2	Panachaiki
	Report (page 19)	Lygnos 12'; Copertino 14'

Nikaia Municipal Gymnasium, Piraeus
10 August 2000
21:00 EEST

A.S. Ampelokipoi	1–6	PAOK
Miskos 50'	Report (page 19)	Camps 2', 45'; Amponsah 10'; Nalitzis 24'; Georgiadis 40' (pen.); Okkas 78'

Kalamaria Stadium, Thessaloniki
Attendance: 1,576
Referee: Giorgos Fasolis (Athens)
9 August 2000
13:00 EEST

Kavala	1–0	Nafpaktiakos Asteras
Kyriakidis 44'	Report (page 19)

Anthi Karagianni Stadium, Kavala

13 August 2000
13:00 EEST

Atromitos	4–0	A.S. Ampelokipoi
Moustakas 50'; Nikolopoulos 59'; Mitsis 82'; Arabatzis 90'	Report (page 19)

Nikaia Municipal Gymnasium, Piraeus
13 August 2000
19:00 EEST

Kavala	1–5	PAOK
Katsabis 37' (o.g.)	Report (page 19)	Angos 9' (o.g.); Camps 34'; Katsabis 60'; Frousos 74', 90'

Anthi Karagianni Stadium, Kavala
Attendance: 1,797
Referee: Filippos Dovas (Phthiotis)
13 August 2000
13:00 EEST

Panachaiki	2–2	Nafpaktiakos Asteras
Katsouranis 15'; Epalle 53'	Report (page 19-20)	Trefski 74'; Papapostolou 88'

Kostas Davourlis Stadium, Patras

20 August 2000
21:00 EEST

A.S. Ampelokipoi	1–2	Kavala
Dartzalis 84'	Report (page 20)	Kyriakidis 55'; Mouratidis 81'

Kalamaria Stadium, Thessaloniki
20 August 2000
21:30 EEST

PAOK	2–0	Panachaiki
Okkas 3'; Vryzas 87'	Report (page 20)

Kalamaria Stadium, Thessaloniki
Attendance: 3,616
Referee: Giorgos Borovilos (Arcadia)
20 August 2000
13:00 EEST

Nafpaktiakos Asteras	5–2	Atromitos
Papapostolou 19', 65'; Loukopoulos 32'; Stylos 44'; Samlidis 51'	Report (page 20)	Pappas 6'; Moustakas 74'

Papacharalambeio National Stadium, Nafpaktos

23 August 2000
13:00 EEST

Kavala	3–1	Atromitos
Dabić 45'; Karaisaridis 73'; Mallios 83'	Report (page 20)	Vahirua 32'

Anthi Karagianni Stadium, Kavala
23 August 2000
13:00 EEST

Panachaiki	6–0	A.S. Ampelokipoi
Jovanović 6'; Solakis 18', 43'; Kefalas 23'; Sebwe 59'; Vukčević 90'	Report (page 20-21)

Kostas Davourlis Stadium, Patras
23 August 2000
18:00 EEST

Nafpaktiakos Asteras	3–3	PAOK
Loukopoulos 39'; Samlidis 64'; Kyparissis 81'	Report (page 21)	Spasić 6'; Nalitzis 60', 78'

Papacharalambeio National Stadium, Nafpaktos
Attendance: 1,430
Referee: Stavros Flotsios (Boeotia)

26 August 2000
19:30 EEST

Atromitos	1–2	PAOK
Vahirua 56'	Report (page 21)	Nalitzis 11', 81' (pen.)

Nikaia Municipal Gymnasium, Piraeus
Attendance: 341
Referee: Theofilaktos Papapanagiotou (Piraeus)
30 August 2000
13:00 EEST

Kavala	2–6	Panachaiki
Rosales 43'; Kyriakidis 67'	Report (page 21)	Taxiarchis 17'; Nikolaidis 24'; Solakis 38', 42', 60', 70'

Anthi Karagianni Stadium, Kavala
30 August 2000
21:00 EEST

A.S. Ampelokipoi	0–2	Nafpaktiakos Asteras
	Report (page 21)	Tengelidis 49', 65'

Kalamaria Stadium, Thessaloniki

6 September 2000
13:00 EEST

Panachaiki	1–2	Atromitos
Solakis 60'	Report (page 21)	Tzivelekis 45'; Moustakias 57'

Kostas Davourlis Stadium, Patras
4 September 2000
17:00 EEST

PAOK	6–1	A.S. Ampelokipoi
Bratić 1', 39'; Spasić 26', 34'; Nalitzis 43'; Kafes 58'	Report (page 21-22)	Radoiković 53'

Epanomi Municipal Stadium, Epanomi
Attendance: 570
Referee: Kyros Vassaras (Macedonia)
3 September 2000
13:00 EEST

Nafpaktiakos Asteras	1–1	Kavala
Trefski 50'	Report (page 22)	Radojičić 78'

Papacharalambeio National Stadium, Nafpaktos

11 September 2000
13:00 EEST

A.S. Ampelokipoi	1–1	Atromitos
Dotsis 48' (pen.)	Report (page 22)	Tsiaousis 27'

Kalamaria Stadium, Thessaloniki
29 November 2000
17:00 EET

PAOK	3–1	Kavala
Frousos 4', 70'; Orfanos 49'	Report (page 22)	Athanasiadis 73'

Toumba Stadium, Thessaloniki
Attendance: 164
Referee: Manolis Giannadakis (Lasithi)

The referee Giannadakis was replaced at the 27th minute by Zografos.

10 September 2000
13:00 EEST

Nafpaktiakos Asteras	2–2	Panachaiki
Loukopoulos 86', 87'	Report (page 22)	Sebwe 28'; Solakis 45'

Papacharalambeio National Stadium, Nafpaktos

4 October 2000
13:00 EEST

Kavala	4–0	A.S. Ampelokipoi
Toivonen 34', 80'; Michelidis 67'; Dabić 70'	Report (page 22)

Anthi Karagianni Stadium, Kavala
5 October 2000
20:45 EEST

Panachaiki	2–3	PAOK
Natrosvili 16'; Vukčević 76'	Report (page 23)	Katsabis 31'; Camps 38' (pen.); Spasić 89'

Kostas Davourlis Stadium, Patras
Referee: Manolis Giannadakis (Lasithi)
4 October 2000
13:00 EEST

Atromitos	2–0	Nafpaktiakos Asteras
Nikolopoulos 46'; Tsiaousis 74'	Report (page 23)

Nikaia Municipal Gymnasium, Piraeus

8 October 2000
13:00 EEST

Atromitos	1–1	Kavala
Nikolopoulos 83'	Report (page 23)	Ampelas 82'

Nikaia Municipal Gymnasium, Piraeus
8 October 2000
13:00 EEST

A.S. Ampelokipoi	1–2	Panachaiki
Dartzalis 55'	Report (page 23)	Vukčević 24', 35'

Kalamaria Stadium, Thessaloniki
8 October 2000
16:00 EEST

PAOK	4–0	Nafpaktiakos Asteras
Frousos 32', 73', 80'; Camps 47'	Report (page 23)

Toumba Stadium, Thessaloniki
Attendance: 337
Referee: Vangelis Tsigras (Athens)

=== Group 5 ===
Pos	Team	Pld	W	D	L	GF	GA	GD	Pts	Qualification	OLY	EGA	ETA	TRI	PTR	ASA
1	Olympiacos	10	9	0	1	39	9	+30	27	Round of 16		4–1	5–0	4–0	4–0	7–0
2	Egaleo	10	8	0	2	23	10	+13	24	Round of 16	3–0		4–0	3–0	5–2	1–0
3	Ethnikos Asteras	10	6	0	4	20	19	+1	18		1–4	2–0		6–0	3–1	3–2
4	Trikala	10	4	0	6	12	22	−10	12		3–5	0–1	2–1		2–1	0–1
5	Patraikos	10	1	1	8	11	28	−17	4		1–4	1–2	1–2	0–3		1–1
6	Anagennisi Karditsa	10	1	1	8	7	24	−17	4		0–2	1–3	0–2	0–2	2–3	

Source: epo.gr
6 August 2000
13:00 EEST

Olympiacos	4–0	Patraikos
Giannakopoulos 1'; Álvez 30'; Đorđević 42'; Choutos 90'	Report (page 24)

Olympic Stadium, Marousi
Referee: Stavros Flotsios (Boeotia)
7 August 2000
13:00 EEST

Egaleo	4–0	Ethnikos Asteras
Manousakis 52', 89'; Panagiotopoulos 83'; Agritis 90'	Report (page 24)

Stavros Mavrothalassitis Stadium, Aigaleo
6 August 2000
13:00 EEST

Trikala	0–1	Anagennisi Karditsa
	Report (page 24)	Chatzis 50'

Trikala Municipal Stadium, Trikala

10 August 2000
13:00 EEST

Patraikos	1–2	Egaleo
Strantzalis 10'	Report (page 24)	Agritis 67', 72'

Prosfygika Stadium, Patras
17 August 2000
13:00 EEST

Anagennisi Karditsa	0–2	Olympiacos
	Report (page 24-25)	Álvez 13'; Giovanni 39'

Municipal Stadium of Karditsa, Karditsa
Referee: Panagiotis Nikou (Imathia)
9 August 2000
13:00 EEST

Ethnikos Asteras	6–0	Trikala
Väisänen 10'; Basinas 28'; Benali 54'; Marinakis 60'; Alexoudis 80'; Papathanasiou 84'	Report (page 25)

Michalis Kritikopoulos Stadium, Kaisariani

14 August 2000
13:00 EEST

Patraikos	1–1	Anagennisi Karditsa
Androutsos 34'	Report (page 25)	Tzellos 88'

Prosfygika Stadium, Patras
12 August 2000
13:00 EEST

Ethnikos Asteras	1–4	Olympiacos
Tešović 65'	Report (page 25)	Luciano 30'; Choutos 38', 86'; Ofori-Quaye 72'

Michalis Kritikopoulos Stadium, Kaisariani
Referee: Manolis Giannadakis (Lasithi)
13 August 2000
13:00 EEST

Egaleo	3–0	Ethnikos Asteras
Papoutsis 19'; Skopelitis 28'; Kogioglou 62' (pen.)	Report (page 25)

Stavros Mavrothalassitis Stadium, Aigaleo

20 August 2000
13:00 EEST

Anagennisi Karditsa	0–2	Ethnikos Asteras
	Report (page 25-26)	Kourdis 2' (o.g.); Benali 44'

Municipal Stadium of Karditsa, Karditsa
4 October 2000
13:00 EEST

Olympiacos	4–1	Egaleo
Álvez 10', 19'; Giannakopoulos 35'; Luciano 67'	Report (page 26)	Manousakis 38'

Olympic Stadium, Marousi
Referee: Kyros Vassaras (Thessaloniki)
19 August 2000
13:00 EEST

Trikala	2–1	Patraikos
Edmílson 31'; Bantas 90'	Report (page 26)	Stathis 45'

Trikala Municipal Stadium, Trikala

23 August 2000
13:00 EEST

Ethnikos Asteras	3–1	Patraikos
Tešović 16', 85' (pen.); Thomaidis 83'	Report (page 26)	Stathis 18'

Michalis Kritikopoulos Stadium, Kaisariani
23 August 2000
13:00 EEST

Egaleo	1–0	Anagennisi Karditsa
Kogioglou 75' (pen.)	Report (page 26)

Stavros Mavrothalassitis Stadium, Aigaleo
23 August 2000
13:00 EEST

Trikala	3–5	Olympiacos
Wellington 28', 47'; Odair 37'	Report (page 26-27)	Giovanni 15', 71', 76'; Ofori-Quaye 32'; Alexandris 34'

Trikala Municipal Stadium, Trikala
Referee: Thanasis Briakos (Epirus)

30 August 2000
13:00 EEST

Ethnikos Asteras	2–0	Egaleo
Tešović 37', 88'	Report (page 27)

Michalis Kritikopoulos Stadium, Kaisariani
30 August 2000
13:00 EEST

Anagennisi Karditsa	0–2	Trikala
	Report (page 27)	Wellington 58'; Edmílson 60'

Municipal Stadium of Karditsa, Karditsa
31 August 2000
13:00 EEST

Patraikos	1–4	Olympiacos
Dragaš 44'	Report (page 27)	Anatolakis 4'; Álvez 58'; Luciano 78'; Alexandris 86'

Prosfygika Stadium, Patras
Referee: Giorgos Kasnaferis (Athens)

3 September 2000
13:00 EEST

Egaleo	5–2	Patraikos
Konate 8'; Papoutsis 41' (pen.); Meidanis 57'; Chloros 70'; Agritis 71'	Report (page 27)	Zekeridis 73', 86'

Stavros Mavrothalassitis Stadium, Aigaleo
3 September 2000
13:00 EEST

Olympiacos	7–0	Anagennisi Karditsa
Zé Elias 12'; Giovanni 35', 89'; Anatolakis 49'; Alexandris 64', 72'; Luciano 87'	Report (page 27-28)

Olympic Stadium, Marousi
Referee: Dimitris Pontikis (Thessaloniki)
5 September 2000
13:00 EEST

Trikala	2–1	Ethnikos Asteras
Bantas 66'; Mitrofanis 71'	Report (page 28)	Tešović 73'

Trikala Municipal Stadium, Trikala

10 September 2000
13:00 EEST

Anagennisi Karditsa	2–3	Patraikos
Chatzigiannis 42'; Boudouris 70' (pen.)	Report (page 28)	Georgopoulos 34'; Dragaš 53'; Qose 90'

Municipal Stadium of Karditsa, Karditsa
10 September 2000
13:00 EEST

Trikala	0–1	Egaleo
	Report (page 28)	Chloros 72'

Trikala Municipal Stadium, Trikala
30 November 2000
13:00 EET

Olympiacos	5–0	Ethnikos Asteras
Choutos 14'; Niniadis 29'; Castillo 60'; Alexandris 79', 90'	Report (page 28)

Kostas Davourlis Stadium, Patras
Referee: Dimitris Pontikis (Thessaloniki)

4 October 2000
13:00 EEST

Ethnikos Asteras	3–2	Anagennisi Karditsa
Thomaidis 20'; Basinas 59'; Marinakis 77'	Report (page 28)	Oikonomou 33'; Audu 45'

Michalis Kritikopoulos Stadium, Kaisariani
4 October 2000
13:00 EEST

Patraikos	0–3	Trikala
	Report (page 29)	Spyrakos 21'; Tasioulas 75'; Papadomanolakis 90'

Prosfygika Stadium, Patras
14 December 2000
13:00 EET

Egaleo	3–0	Olympiacos
Rusev 30'; Makris 47', 49'	Report (page 29)

Stavros Mavrothalassitis Stadium, Aigaleo

8 October 2000
13:00 EEST

Patraikos	1–2	Ethnikos Asteras
Zekeridis 65'	Report (page 29)	Väisänen 56'; Thomaidis 72'

Prosfygika Stadium, Patras
10 September 2000
13:00 EEST

Anagennisi Karditsa	1–3	Egaleo
Chatzigiannis 58'	Report (page 29)	Symeonidis 73'; Panagiotopoulos 84'; Manousakis 90'

Municipal Stadium of Karditsa, Karditsa
8 October 2000
13:00 EEST

Olympiacos	4–0	Trikala
Álvez 9', 34'; Alexandris 43'; Giannakopoulos 73'	Report (page 29)

Olympic Stadium, Marousi
Referee: Paraskevas Chelis (Kavala)

=== Group 6 ===
Pos	Team	Pld	W	D	L	GF	GA	GD	Pts	Qualification	PAO	AEK	AEL	ETP	KOZ	OLV
1	Panathinaikos	10	9	0	1	25	7	+18	27	Round of 16		2–1	3–1	1–0	3–0	4–1
2	AEK Athens	10	8	1	1	38	10	+28	25	Round of 16	3–1		1–0	8–0	5–2	9–1
3	AEL	10	3	2	5	10	13	−3	11		0–2	2–2		1–2	2–1	2–0
4	Ethnikos Piraeus	10	3	1	6	10	23	−13	10		0–3	0–3	0–1		2–1	3–1
5	Kozani	10	2	2	6	13	23	−10	8		1–3	1–4	1–1	1–1		2–0
6	Olympiacos Volos	10	2	0	8	10	30	−20	6		0–3	1–2	1–0	3–2	2–3	

Source: epo.gr
6 August 2000
13:00 EEST

AEL	1–2	Ethnikos Piraeus
Ziagas 10'	Report (page 30)	Vaitsis 24'; Moutas 55'

Alcazar Stadium, Larissa
5 August 2000
13:00 EEST

Panathinaikos	4–1	Olympiacos Volos
Karagounis 12', 27'; Liberopoulos 54' (pen.); Nasiopoulos 83'	Report (page 30)	Zagavieros 37'

Olympic Stadium, Marousi
6 August 2000
21:00 EEST

AEK Athens	5–2	Kozani
Konstantinidis 43', 65'; Lakis 44', 68', 86'	Report (page 30)	Kaounos 7'; Teliadis 52'

Nikos Goumas Stadium, Nea Filadelfeia
Attendance: 676
Referee: Antonis Vassaras (Thessaloniki)

2 August 2000
13:00 EEST

Ethnikos Piraeus	0–3	Panathinaikos
	Report (page 30)	Sypniewski 19'; Sigurðsson 36', 64'

Michalis Kritikopoulos Stadium, Kaisariani
9 August 2000
13:00 EEST

Kozani	1–1	AEL
Kaounos 75'	Report (page 30-31)	Teas 56'

Kozani Stadium, Kozani
9 August 2000
21:00 EEST

Olympiacos Volos	1–2	AEK Athens
Veletanis 45+1'	Report (page 31)	Konstantinidis 48'; Ruiz 75'

Volos Municipal Stadium, Volos
Attendance: 2,900
Referee: Giorgos Borovilos (Arcadia)

13 August 2000
13:00 EEST

Ethnikos Piraeus	2–1	Kozani
Vaitsis 22'; Komiotis 35'	Report (page 31)	Kapriniotis 85'

Michalis Kritikopoulos Stadium, Kaisariani
13 August 2000
13:00 EEST

Olympiacos Volos	1–0	AEL
Veletanis 75'	Report (page 31)

Volos Municipal Stadium, Volos
13 August 2000
21:00 EEST

Panathinaikos	2–1	AEK Athens
Sypniewski 35'; Vokolos 79'	Report (page 31)	Tsiartas 55' (pen.)

Olympic Stadium, Marousi
Attendance: 6,490
Referee: Kostas Finokaliotis (Athens)

20 August 2000
13:00 EEST

Kozani	2–0	Olympiacos Volos
Th. Papadopoulos 40'; Kapetanos 90'	Report (page 31-32)

Kozani Stadium, Kozani
19 August 2000
13:00 EEST

AEL	0–2	Panathinaikos
	Report (page 32)	Kola 35'; Sypniewski 60'

Alcazar Stadium, Larissa
17 August 2000
21:00 EEST

AEK Athens	8–0	Ethnikos Piraeus
Navas 28', 41'; Nikolaidis 34' (pen.), 62', 65', 76'; Konstantinidis 86', 89'	Report (page 32)

Nikos Goumas Stadium, Nea Filadelfeia
Attendance: 1,063
Referee: Giorgos Tsaggarakis (Chania)

24 August 2000
13:00 EEST

Olympiacos Volos	3–2	Ethnikos Piraeus
Norell 34'; Bekos 53'; Goutis 71' (o.g.)	Report (page 31)	Moutas 55' (pen.), 64'

Volos Municipal Stadium, Volos
31 August 2000
13:00 EEST

Panathinaikos	3–0	Kozani
Nasiopoulos 39'; Pflipsen 44'; Kiassos 79'	Report (page 32)

Olympic Stadium, Marousi
30 August 2000
21:30 EEST

AEK Athens	1–0	AEL
Calvo 61'	Report (page 32)

Nikos Goumas Stadium, Nea Filadelfeia
Attendance: 770
Referee: Dimitris Pontikis (Thessaloniki)

27 August 2000
13:00 EEST

Ethnikos Piraeus	0–1	AEL
	Report (page 33)	Gekas 44'

Michalis Kritikopoulos Stadium, Kaisariani
27 August 2000
13:00 EEST

Olympiacos Volos	0–3	Panathinaikos
	Report (page 33)	Vlaović 25', 90'; Sigurðsson 87'

Volos Municipal Stadium, Volos
28 August 2000
18:45 EEST

Kozani	1–4	AEK Athens
Kaounos 58'	Report (page 33)	Konstantinidis 15'; Calvo 59'; Navas 61'; Maladenis 76'

Kozani Stadium, Kozani
Attendance: 10,000
Referee: Panagiotis Nikou (Imathia)

4 September 2000
13:00 EEST

Panathinaikos	1–0	Ethnikos Piraeus
Basinas 9'	Report (page 33)

Olympic Stadium, Marousi
3 September 2000
13:00 EEST

AEL	2–1	Kozani
Tsianakas 21'; Tsakmakidis 29'	Report (page 33)	Anastasiadis 90'

Alcazar Stadium, Larissa
6 September 2000
18:30 EEST

AEK Athens	9–1	Olympiacos Volos
Maladenis 5', 37'; Lakis 36', 52', 73'; Tsiartas 40', 80'; Konstantinidis 47', 57'	Report (page 33-34)	Manda 75'

Nikos Goumas Stadium, Nea Filadelfeia
Attendance: 1,016
Referee: Manolis Giannadakis (Lasithi)

10 September 2000
13:00 EEST

AEL	2–0	Olympiacos Volos
Tsianakas 31'; Gekas 53'	Report (page 34)

Alcazar Stadium, Larissa
10 September 2000
13:00 EEST

Kozani	1–1	Ethnikos Piraeus
Kapriniotis 34'	Report (page 34)	Kotsis 84'

Kozani Stadium, Kozani
29 November 2000
19:45 EET

AEK Athens	3–1	Panathinaikos
Kostis 28'; Konstantinidis 33', 71'	Report (page 34)	Sigurðsson 10'

Nikos Goumas Stadium, Nea Filadelfeia
Attendance: 1,309
Referee: Stavros Flotsios (Boeotia)

4 October 2000
13:00 EEST

Olympiacos Volos	2–3	Kozani
Koutsokostas 46'; Valianatos 73'	Report (page 34)	Kaounos 14'; Kapriniotis 40'; Th. Papadopoulos 56'

Volos Municipal Stadium, Volos
5 October 2000
13:00 EEST

Panathinaikos	3–1	AEL
Vlaović 38', 56'; Sypniewski 40'	Report (page 34)	Teas 51' (pen.)

Olympic Stadium, Marousi
13 December 2000
19:30 EET

Ethnikos Piraeus	0–3	AEK Athens
	Report (page 34)	Calvo 7', 37'; Konstantinidis 11'

Michalis Kritikopoulos Stadium, Kaisariani
Referee: Kiriakos Voutsalas (Thessaloniki)

9 October 2000
13:00 EEST

Ethnikos Piraeus	3–1	Olympiacos Volos
Moutas 44' (pen.); Valvis 65'; Komiotis 73'	Report (page 35)	Bolano 52'

Michalis Kritikopoulos Stadium, Kaisariani
9 October 2000
13:00 EEST

Kozani	1–3	Panathinaikos
Kaounos 40'	Report (page 35)	Fyssas 15'; Pflipsen 43'; Sypniewski 46'

Kozani Stadium, Kozani
9 October 2000
18:00 EEST

AEL	2–2	AEK Athens
Gentch 60'; Kantimoiris 86'	Report (page 35)	Ruiz 44'; Calvo 85'

Alcazar Stadium, Larissa
Attendance: 545
Referee: Thanasis Briakos (Epirus)

=== Group 7 ===
Pos	Team	Pld	W	D	L	GF	GA	GD	Pts	Qualification	PGSS	XAN	APK	PNE	KIL	IAL
1	Panionios	10	5	4	1	21	9	+12	19	Additional Round		1–0	2–2	2–2	4–1	4–0
2	Skoda Xanthi	10	5	3	2	21	6	+15	18	Round of 16	1–1		4–1	3–0	4–1	4–0
3	Apollon Kalamarias	10	5	3	2	20	12	+8	18		1–1	1–0		4–2	0–1	5–0
4	Panelefsiniakos	10	3	3	4	14	20	−6	12		1–0	0–0	1–1		3–2	2–0 (Note: Without match.)
5	Kilkisiakos	10	3	0	7	19	28	−9	9		1–5	0–4	0–2	5–2		5–0
6	Ialysos (Note: Ialysos has −3 points.)	10	2	1	7	9	29	−20	4		0–1	1–1	1–3	3–1	4–3	

Source: epo.gr
Notes:
5 August 2000
13:00 EEST

Panelefsiniakos	2–0 (Awarded)	Ialysos
	Report (page 36)

Municipal Stadium of Elefsina, Elefsina
6 August 2000
13:00 EEST

Apollon Kalamarias	0–1	Kilkisiakos
	Report (page 35-36)	Kasimba 59'

Kalamaria Stadium, Thessaloniki
6 August 2000
13:00 EEST

Skoda Xanthi	1–1	Panionios
Janočko 26'	Report (page 36)	Roberts 45'

A.O. Xanthi Stadium, Xanthi

9 August 2000
13:00 EEST

Ialysos	1–3	Apollon Kalamarias
Troullis 72'	Report (page 36)	Nolis 61', 69'; Moungue 90'

Municipal Stadium Ekonomideio, Ialysos
9 August 2000
13:00 EEST

Panionios	2–2	Panelefsiniakos
Jovanović 45'; Roberts 79'	Report (page 36)	Segos 44'; Tsiakas 73'

Nea Smyrni Stadium, Nea Smyrni
11 August 2000
13:00 EEST

Kilkisiakos	0–4	Skoda Xanthi
	Report (page 36)	Gager 19'; Poursaitidis 46'; Janočko 66'; Verón 86'

Municipal Stadium of Kilkis, Kilkis

14 August 2000
13:00 EEST

Kilkisiakos	5–0	Ialysos
Papapostolou 15'; Panteliadis 46'; Soultanidis 57', 62', 70'	Report (page 36-37)

Municipal Stadium of Kilkis, Kilkis
14 August 2000
13:00 EEST

Panionios	2–2	Apollon Kalamarias
Roberts 15'; Nagbe 90'	Report (page 37)	Nolis 44'; Domoraud 71'

Nea Smyrni Stadium, Nea Smyrni
14 August 2000
13:00 EEST

Skoda Xanthi	3–0	Panelefsiniakos
Diop 59'; Poursaitidis 66'; Madsen 90'	Report (page 37)

A.O. Xanthi Stadium, Xanthi

19 August 2000
13:00 EEST

Apollon Kalamarias	1–0	Skoda Xanthi
Ben Ammar 58'	Report (page 37)

Kalamaria Stadium, Thessaloniki
20 August 2000
13:00 EEST

Panelefsiniakos	3–2	Kilkisiakos
Segos 25', 42', 44'	Report (page 37-38)	Panteliadis 61'; Kasimba 90'

Municipal Stadium of Elefsina, Elefsina
6 September 2000
13:00 EEST

Ialysos	0–1	Panionios
	Report (page 37)	Jovanović 63'

Municipal Stadium Ekonomideio, Ialysos

23 August 2000
13:00 EEST

Panionios	4–1	Kilkisiakos
Roberts 19', 86'; Jovanović 40'; Sakellaridis 55'	Report (page 38)	Stefanidis 51'

Nea Smyrni Stadium, Nea Smyrni
24 August 2000
13:00 EEST

Skoda Xanthi	4–0	Ialysos
Zouboulis 20'; Janočko 47', 55'; Zapropoulos 61'	Report (page 38)

A.O. Xanthi Stadium, Xanthi
24 August 2000
13:00 EEST

Panelefsiniakos	1–1	Apollon Kalamarias
Tsoumas 85'	Report (page 38)	Mouzaoui 49'

Municipal Stadium of Elefsina, Elefsina

27 August 2000
13:00 EEST

Panionios	1–0	Skoda Xanthi
Roberts 31'	Report (page 38-39)

Nea Smyrni Stadium, Nea Smyrni
30 August 2000
13:00 EEST

Kilkisiakos	0–2	Apollon Kalamarias
	Report (page 38)	Nolis 40'; Tziokas 88'

Municipal Stadium of Kilkis, Kilkis
30 August 2000
13:00 EEST

Ialysos	3–1	Panelefsiniakos
Leptokaridis 39'; Tonković 56'; Kalimeris 90'	Report (page 39)	Psomas 53'

Municipal Stadium Ekonomideio, Ialysos

2 September 2000
13:00 EEST

Panelefsiniakos	1–0	Panionios
Kolovos 73'	Report (page 39)

Municipal Stadium of Elefsina, Elefsina
3 September 2000
13:00 EEST

Skoda Xanthi	4–1	Kilkisiakos
Zouboulis 27', 38'; Toursounidis 39'; Poursaitidis 64'	Report (page 39)	Kasimba 21'

A.O. Xanthi Stadium, Xanthi
3 September 2000
13:00 EEST

Apollon Kalamarias	5–0	Ialysos
Baxevanos 7'; Tziokas 50'; Ben Ammar 54'; Platakis 80'; Xanthopoulos 90'	Report (page 39)

Kalamaria Stadium, Thessaloniki

10 September 2000
13:00 EEST

Ialysos	4–3	Kilkisiakos
Leptokaridis 17' (pen.); Karikis 52'; Tonković 79', 90'	Report (page 39)	Moschos 2', 3'; Kakoglou 84' (pen.)

Municipal Stadium Ekonomideio, Ialysos
10 September 2000
13:00 EEST

Panelefsiniakos	0–0	Skoda Xanthi
	Report (page 40)

Municipal Stadium of Elefsina, Elefsina
11 September 2000
13:00 EEST

Apollon Kalamarias	1–1	Panionios
Baxevanos 78'	Report (page 39-40)	Sakellaridis 45'

Kalamaria Stadium, Thessaloniki

4 October 2000
13:00 EEST

Skoda Xanthi	4–1	Apollon Kalamarias
Dikoumé 23'; Kalykas 30'; Damianos 56'; Soares 85'	Report (page 40)	Ben Ammar 33'

A.O. Xanthi Stadium, Xanthi
4 October 2000
13:00 EEST

Kilkisiakos	5–2	Panelefsiniakos
Panteliadis 12'; Stefanidis 25'; Delipaltas 41'; Kasimba 54'; Soultanidis 74'	Report (page 40)	Filippis 6'; Brilis 24'

Municipal Stadium of Kilkis, Kilkis
5 October 2000
13:00 EEST

Panionios	4–0	Ialysos
Demirtzoglou 30'; Ioannou 49'; Jovanović 52'; Chasiotis 80'	Report (page 40)

Nea Smyrni Stadium, Nea Smyrni

8 October 2000
13:00 EEST

Ialysos	1–1	Skoda Xanthi
Leptokaridis 35'	Report (page 41)	Toursounidis 73'

Municipal Stadium Ekonomideio, Ialysos
8 October 2000
13:00 EEST

Apollon Kalamarias	4–2	Panelefsiniakos
Kefalas 29'; Bwelle 34', 40'; Moungue 77'	Report (page 41)	Brilis 45'; Segos 67'

Kalamaria Stadium, Thessaloniki
9 October 2000
13:00 EEST

Kilkisiakos	1–5	Panionios
Angelis 61'	Report (page 40-41)	Ioannou 34'; Vulević 55'; Jovanović 72', 90'; Demirtzoglou 74'

Municipal Stadium of Kilkis, Kilkis

=== Group 8 ===
Pos	Team	Pld	W	D	L	GF	GA	GD	Pts	Qualification	PAS	PRO	OFI	PNT	NAO	VER
1	PAS Giannina	10	6	3	1	22	11	+11	21	Round of 16		1–1	0–0	2–1	3–3	4–0
2	Proodeftiki	10	6	2	2	12	7	+5	20	Round of 16	2–1		2–0	0–3	2–0	2–0
3	OFI	10	6	2	2	16	7	+9	20		1–2	1–0		1–0	1–0	1–1
4	Panetolikos	10	1	4	5	13	16	−3	7		2–5	0–1	1–2		1–1	1–1
5	Naoussa	10	1	4	5	9	18	−9	7		0–2	0–1	1–4	1–1		1–1
6	Veria	10	0	5	5	8	21	−13	5		1–2	1–1	1–1	2–2	1–2	

Source: epo.gr
6 August 2000
13:00 EEST

OFI	5–0	Veria
Kotsios 27'; Ipirotis 42'; Mitsopoulos 56'; Solís 65'; Iordanidis 71'	Report (page 41)

Theodoros Vardinogiannis Stadium, Heraklion
6 August 2000
13:00 EEST

PAS Giannina	3–3	Naoussa
Sapanis 29'; Bletsas 89', 90'	Report (page 42)	Lanaris 7'; Milinković 9', 45'

Zosimades Stadium, Ioannina
7 August 2000
13:00 EEST

Panetolikos	0–1	Proodeftiki
	Report (page 41-42)	Zajmi 90'

Panetolikos Stadium, Agrinio

9 August 2000
13:00 EEST

Naoussa	1–4	OFI
Digozis 11' (o.g.)	Report (page 42)	Mauro 16'; Ipirotis 44'; Gómez 57', 62'

Municipal Stadium of Naousa, Naousa
9 August 2000
13:00 EEST

Proodeftiki	2–1	PAS Giannina
Bayazid 1'; Al Zaher 82'	Report (page 42)	A. Tatsis 47'

Nikaia Municipal Stadium, Piraeus
10 August 2000
13:00 EEST

Veria	2–2	Panetolikos
Athanasiadis 34'; Sidiropoulos 50'	Report (page 42)	Theodoridis 36' (o.g.); Darlas 70'

Veria Stadium, Veria

14 August 2000
13:00 EEST

Veria	1–2	Naoussa
Natsouras 53'	Report (page 42)	Karametaxas 73'; Moschovakos 85'

Veria Stadium, Veria
14 August 2000
13:00 EEST

Panetolikos	2–5	PAS Giannina
Krunić 27'; Stefanidis 51'	Report (page 43)	Bellaj 11', 55'; Lipatín 77'; Garozis 89'; A. Tatsis 90'

Panetolikos Stadium, Agrinio
16 August 2000
13:00 EEST

Proodeftiki	2–0	OFI
Zajmi 24'; Kazantzis 42'	Report (page 43)

Nikaia Municipal Stadium, Piraeus

19 August 2000
13:00 EEST

OFI	1–0	Panetolikos
Mauro 54'	Report (page 43)

Theodoros Vardinogiannis Stadium, Heraklion
19 August 2000
13:00 EEST

PAS Giannina	4–0	Veria
Kormaris 55', 90'; A. Tatsis 76', 88'	Report (page 43)

Zosimades Stadium, Ioannina
21 August 2000
13:00 EEST

Naoussa	0–1	Proodeftiki
	Report (page 43)	Papaioannou 45'

Municipal Stadium of Naousa, Naousa

21 August 2000
13:00 EEST

PAS Giannina	0–0	OFI
	Report (page 44)

Zosimades Stadium, Ioannina
24 August 2000
13:00 EEST

Proodeftiki	2–0	Veria
Zajmi 23'; Al Zaher 90'	Report (page 43-44)

Nikaia Municipal Stadium, Piraeus
24 August 2000
13:00 EEST

Panetolikos	1–1	Naoussa
Spyropoulos 1'	Report (page 44)	Moschovakos 9'

Panetolikos Stadium, Agrinio

27 August 2000
13:00 EEST

Veria	1–1	OFI
Fasidis 12'	Report (page 44)	Gómez 20'

Veria Stadium, Veria
27 August 2000
13:00 EEST

Naoussa	0–2	PAS Giannina
	Report (page 44)	Ofrydopoulos 1'; Feutchine 78'

Municipal Stadium of Naousa, Naousa
30 August 2000
13:00 EEST

Proodeftiki	0–3	Panetolikos
	Report (page 44)	Kouloucheris 23' (o.g.); Athanasiadis 62'; Spyropoulos 83'

Nikaia Municipal Stadium, Piraeus

3 September 2000
13:00 EEST

Panetolikos	1–1	Veria
Trichias 43'	Report (page 45)	Niras 61'

Panetolikos Stadium, Agrinio
6 September 2000
13:00 EEST

OFI	1–0	Naoussa
Gómez 69'	Report (page 45)

Theodoros Vardinogiannis Stadium, Heraklion
6 September 2000
13:00 EEST

PAS Giannina	1–1	Proodeftiki
Kormaris 50'	Report (page 45)	Al Zaher 90'

Zosimades Stadium, Ioannina

10 September 2000
13:00 EEST

Naoussa	1–1	Veria
Grossis 74'	Report (page 45)	Providas 58'

Municipal Stadium of Naousa, Naousa
10 September 2000
13:00 EEST

OFI	1–0	Proodeftiki
Gómez 90'	Report (page 45)

Theodoros Vardinogiannis Stadium, Heraklion
10 September 2000
13:00 EEST

PAS Giannina	2–1	Panetolikos
Bellaj 21' (pen.); Seitaridis 69'	Report (page 45)	Koutsospyros 67'

Zosimades Stadium, Ioannina

4 October 2000
13:00 EEST

Proodeftiki	2–0	Naoussa
Papaioannou 14', 28'	Report (page 46)

Nikaia Municipal Stadium, Piraeus
4 October 2000
13:00 EEST

Panetolikos	1–2	OFI
Koutsospyros 25'	Report (page 46)	Solís 38'; Mauro 81'

Panetolikos Stadium, Agrinio
4 October 2000
13:00 EEST

Veria	1–2	PAS Giannina
Niras 90'	Report (page 46)	Sapanis 69'; A. Tatsis 87'

Veria Stadium, Veria

8 October 2000
13:00 EEST

Veria	1–1	Proodeftiki
Niras 11'	Report (page 46)	Kazantzis 45'

Veria Stadium, Veria
8 October 2000
13:00 EEST

Naoussa	1–2	Panetolikos
Moschovakos 61'	Report (page 46)	Dacroce 9'; Fidas 66' (pen.)

Municipal Stadium of Naousa, Naousa
8 October 2000
13:00 EEST

OFI	1–2	PAS Giannina
Bletsas 45' (o.g.)	Report (page 46)	Kormaris 26', 70'

Theodoros Vardinogiannis Stadium, Heraklion

== Knockout phase ==
Each tie in the knockout phase, apart from the additional round and the final, was played over two legs, with each team playing one leg at home. The team that scored more goals on aggregate over the two legs advanced to the next round. If the aggregate score was level, the away goals rule was applied, i.e. the team that scored more goals away from home over the two legs advanced. If away goals were also equal, then extra time was played. The away goals rule was again applied after extra time, i.e. if there were goals scored during extra time and the aggregate score was still level, the visiting team advanced by virtue of more away goals scored. If no goals were scored during extra time, the winners were decided by a penalty shoot-out. In the additional round and the final, which were played as a single match, if the score was level at the end of normal time, extra time was played, followed by a penalty shoot-out if the score was still level.
The mechanism of the draws for each round is as follows:

- There are no seedings, and teams from the same group can be drawn against each other.

== Additional round ==
=== Summary ===
Team 1	Score	Team 2
Paniliakos	1–0	Chalkidona
Panionios	7–2	Apollon Krya Vrysi

=== Matches ===
20 December 2000
17:00 EET

Paniliakos	1–0	Chalkidona
Sapanis 23' (pen.)	Report (page 47)

Pyrgos Stadium, Pyrgos
Referee: Spyros Papadakos (Laconia)

20 December 2000
19:45 EET

Panionios	7–2	Apollon Krya Vrysi
Roberts 16'; Ioannou 60', 76'; Mourtzilas 62' (o.g.); Sakellaridis 65'; Kafalis 74'; Jovanović 84'	Report (page 47)	Tsatsos 12'; Konstantinidis 90'

Nea Smyrni Stadium, Nea Smyrni

== Bracket ==
Round of 16
Panserraikos	0	0	0
Panachaiki	1	1	2
Iraklis	2	2	4
PAS Giannina	1	1	2
AEK Athens	0	1	1
Olympiacos	2	6	8
Panionios	1	2	3
Panathinaikos	0	7	7
Aris	1	0	1
PAOK	1	2	3
Skoda Xanthi (a)	2	1	3
Ionikos	0	3	3
Paniliakos (p)	1	0	1(3)
Proodeftiki	0	1	1(2)
Apollon Athens (a)	0	1	1
Egaleo	0	1	1

Quarter-finals
Panachaiki	1	0	1
Iraklis	0	2	2
Olympiacos	1	4	5
Panathinaikos	1	1	2
PAOK	2	2	4
Skoda Xanthi	0	1	1
Paniliakos	1	0	1
Apollon Athens	3	1	4

Semi-finals
Iraklis	0	4	4
Olympiacos	1	5	6
PAOK	5	0	5
Apollon Athens	2	1	3

Final
Olympiacos	2
PAOK	4

== Round of 16 ==
The draw took place on 7 December 2000.

=== Summary ===
Team 1	Agg.	Team 2	1st leg	2nd leg
Panionios	3–7	Panathinaikos	1–0	2–7
AEK Athens	1–8	Olympiacos	0–2 (w/o)	1–6
Skoda Xanthi	(a) 3–3	Ionikos	2–0	1–3
Iraklis	4–2	PAS Giannina	2–1	2–1
Aris	1–3	PAOK	1–1	0–2
Panserraikos	0–2	Panachaiki	0–1	0–1
Paniliakos	1–1 (3–2 p)	Proodeftiki	1–0	0–1
Apollon Athens	(a) 1–1	Egaleo	0–0	1–1

=== Matches ===
17 January 2001
18:30 EET

Panionios	1–0	Panathinaikos
Jovanović 47'	Report (page 48)

Nea Smyrni Stadium, Nea Smyrni
Attendance: 956
Referee: Pavlos Papilias (Piraeus)
31 January 2001
18:30 EET

Panathinaikos	7–2	Panionios
Basinas 11', 67'; Warzycha 14', 36', 52'; Nasiopoulos 63'; Koutsoures 86'	Report (page 49)	Ioannou 28'; Préget 90'

Leoforos Alexandras Stadium, Ampelokipoi
Attendance: 5,152

Panathinaikos won 7–3 on aggregate.

10 January 2001
20:00 EET

AEK Athens	0–2 (Awarded)	Olympiacos
Nikolaidis 46'	Report (page 48)	Niniadis 67'

Nikos Goumas Stadium, Nea Filadelfeia
Attendance: 14,062
Referee: Dimitris Pontikis (Thessaloniki)

Match abandoned at the 73rd while the game was at 1–1. It was awarded 0–2 to Olympiacos.

24 January 2001
20:00 EET

Olympiacos	6–1	AEK Athens
Georgatos 5'; Giovanni 21', 32'; Ofori-Quaye 52'; Álvez 79'; Giannakopoulos 83'	Report (page 50)	Maladenis 24'

Olympic Stadium, Marousi
Attendance: 11,925
Referee: Makis Efthimiadis (Drama)

Olympiacos won 8–1 on aggregate.

17 January 2001
16:00 EET

Xanthi	2–0	Ionikos
Damianos 86'; Kaounos 89'	Report (page 48)

Xanthi Ground, Xanthi
31 January 2001
17:30 EET

Ionikos	3–1	Xanthi
Curbelo 13'; Delgado 33' (pen.); Piaggio 42'	Report (page 49)	Kaounos 9'

Neapoli Stadium, Piraeus

Xanthi won on away goals.

17 January 2001
16:00 EET

Iraklis	2–1	PAS Giannina
Gojković 36'; Fofonka 76'	Report (page 47)	Élder 40'

Kaftanzoglio Stadium, Thessaloniki
31 January 2001
15:00 EET

PAS Giannina	1–2	Iraklis
Élder 52'	Report (page 49)	Konstantinou 32'; Fofonka 58'

Zosimades Stadium, Ioannina

Iraklis won 4–2 on aggregate.

17 January 2001
20:00 EET

Aris	1–1	PAOK
Katsiaros 37'	Report (page 48)	Engomitis 41'

Aris Stadium, Thessaloniki
Attendance: 9,325
Referee: Paraskevas Chelis (Kavala)
31 January 2001
20:00 EET

PAOK	2–0	Aris
Koulakiotis 45+2'; Konstantinidis 82'	Report (page 49)

Toumba Stadium, Thessaloniki
Attendance: 18,564
Referee: Christos Daglis (Macedonia)

PAOK won 3–1 on aggregate.

10 January 2001
15:00 EET

Panserraikos	0–1	Panachaiki
	Report (page 48)	Vukčević 50' (pen.)

Serres Municipal Stadium, Serres
24 January 2001
14:30 EET

Panachaiki	1–0	Panserraikos
Vavilis 33'	Report (page 49)

Kostas Davourlis Stadium, Patras

Panachaiki won 2–0 on aggregate.

10 January 2001
15:00 EET

Paniliakos	1–0	Proodeftiki
Bandović 45'	Report (page 48)

Pyrgos Stadium, Pyrgos
Referee: Vangelis Tsigras (Athens)
24 January 2001
14:30 EET

Proodeftiki	1–0 (a.e.t.)	Paniliakos
Al Zaher 45'	Report (page 49)
Penalties
Al Zaher (penalty missed); Makor (penalty scored); Piliouras (penalty scored); Dagas (penalty missed); Pantos (penalty missed)	2–3	(penalty scored) Mandra; (penalty scored) Sapanis; (penalty scored) Papadopoulos; (penalty missed) Taralidis

Nikaia Municipal Stadium, Piraeus
Referee: Kostas Finokaliotis (Athens)

Paniliakos won 3–2 on penalties.

16 January 2001
15:00 EET

Apollon Athens	0–0	Egaleo
	Report (page 48)

Rizoupoli Stadium, Rizoupoli
30 January 2001
14:30 EET

Egaleo	1–1	Apollon Athens
Kogioglou 34' (pen.)	Report (page 50)	Bekiaris 90'

Stavros Mavrothalassitis Stadium, Aigaleo

Apollon Athens won on away goals.

== Quarter-finals ==
The draw took place on 1 February 2001.

=== Summary ===
Team 1	Agg.	Team 2	1st leg	2nd leg
Paniliakos	1–4	Apollon Athens	1–3	0–1
Olympiacos	5–2	Panathinaikos	1–1	4–1
Panachaiki	1–2	Iraklis	1–0	0–2
PAOK	4–1	Skoda Xanthi	2–0	2–1

=== Matches ===
7 February 2001
17:00 EET

Paniliakos	1–3	Apollon Athens
Mandra 68' (pen.)	Report (page 50)	Papadimitriou 36' (pen.); Skarmoutsos 79'; Petković 90'

Pyrgos Stadium, Pyrgos
Referee: Manolis Giannadakis (Lasithi)
7 March 2001
15:00 EET

Apollon Athens	1–0	Paniliakos
Skarmoutsos 20'	Report (page 51)

Rizoupoli Stadium, Rizoupoli
Referee: Giorgos Borovilos (Arcadia)

Apollon Athens won 4–1 on aggregate.

7 February 2001
20:00 EET

Olympiacos	1–1	Panathinaikos
Đorđević 27' (pen.)	Report (page 50)	Liberopoulos 88'

Olympic Stadium, Marousi
Attendance: 42,845
Referee: Giorgos Tsangarakis (Chania)
21 March 2001
20:00 EET

Panathinaikos	1–4	Olympiacos
Liberopoulos 43'	Report (page 51)	Alexandris 5'; Luciano 9'; Georgatos 61' (pen.); Giovanni 84'

Leoforos Alexandras Stadium, Ampelokipoi
Attendance: 12,759
Referee: Thanasis Briakos (Epirus)

Olympiacos won 5–2 on aggregate.

21 February 2001
18:30 EET

Panachaiki	1–0	Iraklis
Solakis 55' (pen.)	Report (page 50)

Kostas Davourlis Stadium, Patras
14 March 2001
18:00 EET

Iraklis	2–0	Panachaiki
Sapountzis 45'; Konstantinou 57'	Report (page 51)

Kaftanzoglio Stadium, Thessaloniki
Referee: Paraskevas Chelis (Kavala)

Iraklis won 2–1 on aggregate.

21 February 2001
20:00 EET

PAOK	2–0	Xanthi
Konstantinidis 26'; Georgiadis 51'	Report (page 50)

Toumba Stadium, Thessaloniki
Attendance: 7,168
Referee: Makis Efthimiadis (Drama)
7 March 2001
20:00 EET

Xanthi	1–2	PAOK
Zapropoulos 67'	Report (page 51)	Udeze 20'; Georgiadis 71'

Xanthi Ground, Xanthi
Attendance: 2,246
Referee: Kostas Vallianos (Aetoloacarnania)

PAOK won 4–1 on aggregate.

== Semi-finals ==
The draw took place on 22 March 2001.

=== Summary ===
Team 1	Agg.	Team 2	1st leg	2nd leg
PAOK	5–3	Apollon Athens	5–2	0–1
Iraklis	4–6	Olympiacos	0–1	4–5

=== Matches ===
4 April 2001
17:00 EEST

PAOK	5–2	Apollon Athens
Georgiadis 22' (pen.), 83'; Amponsah 33'; Nalitzis 73'; Kafes 87'	Report (page 51-52)	Chatzis 54'; Skarmoutsos 85'

Toumba Stadium, Thessaloniki
Attendance: 9,263
Referee: Makis Efthimiadis (Drama)
11 April 2001
16:00 EEST

Apollon Athens	1–0	PAOK
Papadimitriou 13'	Report (page 52)

Rizoupoli Stadium, Rizoupoli
Attendance: 640
Referee: Thanasis Briakos (Epirus)

PAOK won 5–3 on aggregate.

4 April 2001
19:00 EEST

Iraklis	0–1	Olympiacos
	Report (page 52)	Alexandris 3'

Kaftanzoglio Stadium, Thessaloniki
Attendance: 9,382
Referee: Giorgos Borovilos (Arcadia)
11 April 2001
19:00 EEST

Olympiacos	5–4	Iraklis
Đorđević 10' (pen.); Zé Elias 52'; Giovanni 56', 90'; Choutos 80'	Report (page 52)	Haxhi 1'; Konstantinou 37', 76'; Gojković 61'

Olympic Stadium, Marousi
Attendance: 13,243
Referee: Panagiotis Nikou (Imathia)

Olympiacos won 6–4 on aggregate.

== Final ==
12 May 2001
21:00 EEST

Olympiacos	2–4	PAOK
Đorđević 78' (pen.); Choutos 90+2'	Report (page 52)	Engomitis 4'; Borbokis 31'; Georgiadis 46'; Nalitzis 85'

Nikos Goumas Stadium, Nea Filadelfia
Attendance: 13,300
Referee: Giorgos Kasnaferis (Athens)

== Top scorers ==
Rank	Player	Club	Goals
1	(Greece) Sotiris Konstantinidis	AEK Athens	11
1	(Brazil) Giovanni	Olympiacos	11
3	(Greece) Ilias Solakis	Panachaiki	10
3	(Cyprus) Michalis Konstantinou	Iraklis	10
5	(Greece) Alexis Alexandris	Olympiacos	9
6	(Uruguay) Gabriel Álvez	Olympiacos	8
6	(Greece) Dimitris Nalitzis	PAOK	8
6	(Greece) Nikos Skarmoutsos	Apollon Athens	8
9	(Greece) Nikolaos Frousos	PAOK	7
9	(Liberia) Zizi Roberts	Panionios	7
9	(Federal Republic of Yugoslavia) Saša Jovanović	Panionios	7
9	(Greece) Vangelis Kaounos	Kozani / Skoda Xanthi	7
9	(Brazil) Ederson Fofonka	Iraklis	7
