= List of top goalscorers in Beta Ethniki by season =

This is the list of Greek Second Division top goalscorers by season.

1983–84

- (Greece) Dimitris Tzeplidis of Edessaikos with 21 goals
- (Greece) Andreas Anagnostou of Pierikos with 16 goals
- (Greece) Christos Mesimerlis of Edessaikos with 15 goals

1984–85

- (Greece) Kostas Paraskevopoulos of Almopos with 19 goals
- (Greece) Ilias Vakoufaris of Agrotikos Asteras with 16 goals
- (Greece) Giannis Papadopoulos of Edessaikos with 16 goals

1985–86

- (Greece) Alekos Panagiotidis of Naoussa with 21 goals
- (Greece) Kostas Vellios of Edessaikos with 17 goals
- (Greece) Ilias Vakoufaris of Veria with 16 goals

1986–87

- (Greece) Kostas Kottakis of Ionikos with 20 goals
- (Greece) Nikos Kriezis of Skoda Xanthi with 17 goals
- (Greece) Apostolos Drakopoulos of Panachaiki with 16 goals

1987–88

- (Greece) Kostas Kottakis of Ionikos with 18 goals
- (Greece) Dimitris Nolis of Kastoria with 17 goals
- (Greece) Nikos Gambetas of Doxa Dramas with 15 goals

1988–89

- (Greece) Achilleas Adamopoulos of Skoda Xanthi with 30 goals
- (Greece) Vasilis Keramidas of PAS Giannina with 17 goals
- (Bulgaria) Dian Veliskov of Panserraikos with 15 goals

1989–90

- (Greece) Alexis Alexandris of Veria with 21 goals
- (Greece) Giorgos Vaitsis of Panachaiki with 17 goals
- (Greece) Michalis Chantabakis of Niki Volos with 17 goals

1990–91

- (Greece) Alexis Alexandris of Veria with 16 goals
- (Greece) Nikos Tsoleridis of Apollon Kalamarias with 16 goals
- (Greece) Androklis Konstantinidis of Atromitos with 15 goals

1991–92

- (Greece) Dimitris Nolis of Apollon Kalamarias with 21 goals
- (Greece) Michalis Alexiadis of Naoussa with 13 goals
- (Greece) Vasilios Tsiartas of Naoussa with 13 goals

1992–93

- (Greece) Kostas Tsanas of Levadiakos with 14 goals
- Miroslav Zivkovic of Naoussa with 13 goals
- (Federal Republic of Yugoslavia) Predrag Mitić of Pontioi Veria with 12 goals

1993–94

- (Federal Republic of Yugoslavia) Zdenko Muf of PAS Giannina with 29 goals
- (Federal Republic of Yugoslavia) Predrag Mitić of Pontioi Veria with 16 goals
- (Albania) Arjan Bellaj of PAS Giannina with 14 goals

1994–95

- (Greece) Nikos Kakanoulias of Panargiakos with 17 goals
- (Federal Republic of Yugoslavia) Bogoljub Randjelovic of Pierikos with 17 goals
- (Greece) Georgios Strantzalis of Paniliakos with 14 goals

1995–96

- (Syria) Mohammad Nasser Afash of Proodeftiki with 17 goals
- (Federal Republic of Yugoslavia) Sasa Markovic of Panelefsiniakos with 15 goals
- (Greece) Marios Sengos of Ialysos with 15 goals

1996–97

- (Greece) Giannis Paflias of Niki Volos with 18 goals
- (Greece) Isaak Almanidis of Proodeftiki with 16 goals
- (Greece) Michalis Klokidis of Levadiakos with 15 goals

1997–98

- (Federal Republic of Yugoslavia) Davor Jakovljevic of Ethnikos Asteras with 35 goals
- (Brazil) Ademar of Panserraikos with 23 goals
- (Greece) Theodoros Armylagos of Panelefsiniakos with 20 goals

1998–99

- (Greece) Giorgos Kiourkos of Kallithea with 22 goals
- (Federal Republic of Yugoslavia) Miodrag Medan of PAS Giannina with 16 goals
- (Federal Republic of Yugoslavia) Milos Dabic of Lykoi with 14 goals

1999–2000

- (Greece) Giorgos Papandreou of Athinaikos with 24 goals
- (Brazil) Ademar of Panserraikos with 18 goals
- (Algeria) Karim Mouzaoui of Apollon Kalamarias with 17 goals

2000–01

- (Greece) Thomas Makris of Egaleo with 16 goals
- (Greece) Giorgos Zacharopoulos of Kallithea with 15 goals
- (Greece) Lefteris Velentzas of Akratitos with 13 goals

2001–02

- (Greece) Theofanis Gekas of Kallithea with 14 goals
- (Greece) Giorgos Zacharopoulos of Chalkidona with 12 goals
- (Greece) Ioannis Lazanas of Patraikos with 10 goals

2002–03

- (Greece) Giorgos Zacharopoulos of Chalkidona with 21 goals
- (Greece) Giannis Thomaidis of Paniliakos with 15 goals
- (Greece) Thomas Troupkos of Apollon Kalamarias with 15 goals

2003–04

- (Brazil) Cleyton of Apollon Kalamarias with 15 goals
- (Brazil) Formiga of Atromitos with 12 goals
- (Greece) Sokratis Bountouris of Poseidon Neon Poron with 12 goals

2004–05

- (Greece) Ilias Kabas of Ilisiakos with 18 goals
- (Greece) Giorgos Saitiotis of Olympiacos Volos with 14 goals
- (Greece) Ilias Manikas of Paniliakos with 14 goals

2005–06

- (Nigeria) (Greece) Patrick Ogunsoto of Ergotelis with 17 goals
- (Greece) Ilias Kabas of Ilisiakos with 15 goals
- (Greece) Giorgos Saitiotis of Niki Volos with 13 goals

2006–07

- (Greece) Ilias Solakis of Kastoria with 21 goals
- (Greece) Giorgos Saitiotis of PAS Giannina with 18 goals
- (Greece) Ilias Kabas of Ilisiakos with 15 goals

2007–08

- (Greece) Ilias Anastasakos of Thrasyvoulos with 18 goals
- (Greece) Evangelos Kaounos of Kalamata with 15 goals
- (Nigeria) Benjamin Onwuachi of Ionikos with 14 goals
