= 1998–99 Beta Ethniki =

Beta Ethniki
- Season: 1998–99
- Dates: 29 August 1998 – 30 May 1999
- Champions: Trikala
- Promoted: Trikala; Panachaiki; Kalamata
- Relegated: Doxa Vyronas; ILTEX Lykoi; Niki Volos; Edessaikos

Beta Ethniki 1998–99 complete season.

== League table ==
Location of teams in 1998–99 Beta Ethniki

Pos	Team	Pld	W	D	L	GF	GA	GD	Pts	Promotion or relegation
1	Trikala (C, P)	34	20	8	6	59	29	+30	68	Promotion to Alpha Ethniki
2	Panachaiki (P)	34	20	8	6	56	30	+26	68	Promotion to Alpha Ethniki
3	Kalamata (P)	34	19	8	7	47	25	+22	65	Promotion to Alpha Ethniki
4	PAS Giannina	34	19	8	7	51	22	+29	65	
5	Kallithea	34	19	5	10	59	40	+19	62	
6	Agios Nikolaos	34	14	10	10	36	35	+1	52	
7	Panserraikos	34	15	4	15	44	37	+7	49	
8	AEL	34	13	7	14	45	47	−2	46	
9	Apollon Kalamarias	34	12	9	13	43	44	−1	45	
10	Pierikos	34	11	10	13	38	39	−1	43	
11	Athinaikos	34	12	5	17	37	35	+2	41	
12	Ialysos	34	11	8	15	33	43	−10	41	
13	Panetolikos	34	11	8	15	43	57	−14	41	
14	Anagennisi Karditsa	34	10	11	13	35	42	−7	41	
15	Doxa Vyronas (R)	34	8	13	13	39	43	−4	37	Relegation to Gamma Ethniki
16	ILTEX Lykoi (R)	34	11	4	19	38	51	−13	37	Relegation to Gamma Ethniki
17	Niki Volos (R)	34	8	4	22	35	63	−28	28	Relegation to Gamma Ethniki
18	Edessaikos (R)	34	4	8	22	17	73	−56	20	Relegation to Gamma Ethniki

(C) Champions; (P) Promoted; (R) Relegated

== Results ==
Home \ Away	AGN	KRD	APL	ATH	DXV	EDE	IAL	LYK	KAL	KLT	AEL	NVL	PCK	PNT	PSE	PAS	PIE	TRI
Agios Nikolaos		3–0	2–1	1–0	1–0	1–1	2–0	3–0	0–0	1–2	3–2	3–1	1–2	3–2	1–0	0–0	0–0	2–4
Anagennisi Karditsa	0–1		2–0	0–1	0–0	0–0	0–0	2–0	0–0	2–1	2–0	3–1	2–0	1–2	2–0	2–1	0–0	1–1
Apollon Kalamarias	0–0	3–1		2–0	1–1	2–1	3–1	2–0	4–1	1–1	3–1	6–0	0–1	2–2	0–2	1–1	0–0	0–1
Athinaikos	1–0	2–0	2–1		2–2	3–0	2–0	2–0	1–2	0–1	1–1	3–0	1–1	3–1	2–0	0–1	2–0	0–1
Doxa Vyronas	0–1	3–3	0–0	0–0		5–0	1–1	3–1	0–0	3–0	2–1	0–1	3–2	2–1	2–0	1–1	1–1	0–5
Edessaikos	0–1	1–2	0–0	2–1	3–2		0–0	0–3	0–2	0–4	1–1	1–0	0–0	2–3	0–0	0–5	1–2	0–2
Ialysos	0–0	2–0	0–2	2–0	2–1	2–0		3–0	2–1	0–1	1–1	3–2	0–1	2–1	3–0	2–2	1–0	2–1
ILTEX Lykoi	2–2	3–1	3–0	1–0	1–0	3–1	1–0		0–0	2–0	0–1	1–3	4–1	2–0	0–1	0–1	2–1	1–2
Kalamata	3–0	2–2	1–0	1–0	1–0	5–1	1–0	1–0		3–0	1–0	3–0	1–1	1–0	2–1	2–1	1–2	1–0
Kallithea	5–0	2–2	5–1	3–2	1–0	3–0	2–1	0–0	2–1		2–1	2–0	0–0	5–1	3–0	3–1	1–0	2–1
AEL	2–0	0–0	4–1	2–0	1–2	2–0	2–1	2–0 (Note: Awarded with 2–0, Lykoi was disqualified from Championship.)	1–2	1–1		1–0	1–3	4–2	2–1	0–2	1–1	1–0
Niki Volos	1–1	1–1	1–2	1–2	4–1	0–1	3–0	2–2	1–2	2–0	1–2		1–5	0–1	2–0	1–0	2–1	1–1
Panachaiki	0–0	2–0	1–0	1–0	2–0	2–0	3–0	2–1	2–1	4–3	4–0	2–0		2–0	1–0	0–0	6–2	1–1
Panetolikos	0–1	2–1	0–0	1–1	3–2	1–1	1–1	3–2	0–0	2–3	2–0 (Note: Awarded with 2–0, AEL was disqualified for 1 game from Championship.)	3–2	3–2		2–0	1–0	1–1	1–1
Panserraikos	1–1	3–1	2–0	1–0	0–0	3–0	4–0	3–1	1–0	2–0	2–0	3–0	1–2	5–0		2–1	4–2	0–1
PAS Giannina	2–0	1–0	5–0	3–0	1–1	4–0	2–1	1–0	0–3	3–0	2–1	2–1	3–0	1–0	1–0		2–0	1–0
Pierikos	1–0	0–1	0–3	1–4	0–0	5–0	0–0	5–1	1–0	2–1	1–3	2–0	0–0	2–0	3–0	0–0		2–0
Trikala	2–1	4–1	3–1	1–0	2–1	4–0	3–0	3–1	2–2	1–0	3–3	3–0	1–0	2–1	2–2	0–0	1–0	

Legend: Blue = home team win; Yellow = draw; Red = away team win.

== Top scorers ==
Rank	Player	Club	Goals
1	(Greece) Giorgos Kiourkos	Kallithea	22
2	(Federal Republic of Yugoslavia) Miodrag Medan	PAS Giannina	16
3	(Federal Republic of Yugoslavia) Miloš Dabić	ILTEX Lykoi	14
4	(Federal Republic of Yugoslavia) Dušan Jovanović	Panachaiki	13
5	(Greece) Giannis Paflias	Panachaiki	12
6	(Greece) Michalis Iordanidis	Trikala	10
6	(Greece) Ilias Michelidis	Doxa Vyronas	10
6	(Federal Republic of Yugoslavia) Nebojša Maksimović	Pierikos	10
6	(Greece) Georgios Tsoukalidis	Pierikos	10
6	(Greece) Stelios Tsamfiloglou	Apollon Kalamarias	10
