= List of Apollon Smyrnis players =

Apollon Smyrnis is a Greek professional football team formed in 1891. The club first entered the Greek Football Cup in the 1931–1932 season. The club also was a founding member of the Athens Football Clubs Association in 1924, where they played until they qualified for the Panhellenic Championship.

Throughout its history the club's first team has competed in various national and international competitions. All players who have played in 50 or more such matches are listed below.

== Key ==
- Players with name in **bold** currently play for the club.
- Years are the first and last calendar years in which the player appeared in competitive first-team football for the club.
- League appearances and goals comprise those in the Gamma Ethniki, Beta Ethniki and the Alpha Ethniki.
- Total appearances and goals comprise those in the Gamma Ethniki, Beta Ethniki and Alpha Ethniki, Greek Football Cup, Greek Super Cup, and several now-defunct competitions.

== Players with 50 or more appearances ==
Appearances and goals are for first-team competitive matches only. Substitute appearances are included. Statistics are correct as of 8 November 2009.

Position key: GK – Goalkeeper; DF – Defender; MF – Midfielder; FW – Forward

Name	Nationality	Position	Apollon Smyrnis career	League Appearances	League Goals	Total Appearances	Total Goals	Notes
Nikos Simigladas	Greece	FW	1960–1972	288	?	?	?	
Kostas Vertsonis	Greece	?	1961–1969	224	?	?	?	
Vassilis Kryiakou	Greece	FW	1964–1972	224	?	?	?	
Takis Asimakopoulos	Greece	DF	1965–1980	215	?	?	?	
Kostas Negris	Greece	DF	1970–1974	61	0	?	?	
Christos Ardizoglou	Greece	MF	1971–1974; 1985–1986	50	6	?	?	
Giannis Pathiakakis	Greece	FW	1971–1977; 1981–1983; 1986	142	19	?	?	
Nikos Karoulias	Greece	DF	1976–1980	98	10	?	?	
Giannis Dontas	Greece	DF	1976–1982	160	9	?	?	
Ilias Berios	Greece	DF	1977–1982; 1988–1991	159	0	?	?	
Zygmunt Kukla	Poland	GK	1981–1983	65	0	?	?	
Kostas Antoniou	Greece	MF	1981–1983	53	6	?	?	
Eleftherios Poupakis	Greece	GK	1983–1986	60	0	?	?	
Giorgos Athanasiadis	Greece	FW	1984–1986; 1988–1991	131	38	?	?	
Kostas Pozapalidis	Greece	DF	1985–1995	264	1	?	?	
Michalis Vlachos	Greece	DF	1985–1991	122	11	?	?	
Thanasis Kolitsidakis	Greece	DF	1988–1993	146	2	?	?	
Imre Katzenbach	Hungary	FW	1989–1994	116	23	?	?	
Aris Karasavvidis	Greece	FW	1989–1993	122	41	?	?	
Theofilos Karasavvidis	Greece	MF	1989–1995	187	20	?	?	
Alvertos Papadakis	Greece	DF	1989–1994	111	2	?	?	
Lefteris Velentzas	Greece	MF	1989–1998	182	25	?	?	
Antonis Platinakis	Greece	MF	1991–1995	57	3	?	?	
Theodoris Alexis	Greece	FW	1992–1997; 1997–1998; 1998–2000	191	23	?	?	
Milenko Kovačević	Serbia	MF	1992–1995	93	13	?	?	
Kostas Ioannou	Greece	DF	1993–1999	160	2	?	?	
Antonis Minou	Greece	GK	1993–1996	79	0	?	?	
Demis Nikolaidis	Greece	FW	1993–1996	80	38	?	?	
Bernard Barnjak	Bosnia and Herzegovina	FW	1994–1996	62	28	?	?	
Bledar Kola	Albania	MF	1994–1996; 2003–2004	82	12	?	?	
Stavros Labriakos	Greece	FW	1995–2001	130	33	?	?	
Pantelis Konstantinidis	Greece	MF	1996–1998	58	2	?	?	
Giorgos Karagounis	Greece	MF	1996–1998	55	9	?	?	
Kostas Chalkias	Greece	GK	1996–1999	75	0	?	?	
Nicolas Dikoume	Cameroon	FW	1996–1999	86	20	?	?	
Nikos Sakelaridis	Greece	MF	1997–1998	58	3	?	?	
Indrit Fortuzi	Albania	MF	1997–2000	56	2	?	?	
Ilias Anastasakos	Greece	FW	1998–2000; 2001–2002	91	19	?	?	
