= Michalis Klokidis =

Greek footballer

Personal information
- Full name: Michail Klokidis
- Date of birth: 23 December 1971 (age 54)
- Place of birth: Chrysoupoli, Greece
- Height: 1.81 m (5 ft 11 in)
- Position: Forward

Senior career*
Years	Team	Apps	(Gls)
1996–1998	Levadiakos		(29)
1998–2000	ILTEX Lykoi		
2000	Agersani Naxos		
2000–2001	Leonidio		(21)
2001–2002	Kerkyra		(19)
2002–2003	Thrasyvoulos	36	(18)
2003–2004	Rodos		(29)
2004–2007	Asteras Tripolis		(62)
2007–2008	Korinthos		
2008–2009	Makedonikos		
2009–2011	Nestos Chrysoupoli		
- * Club domestic league appearances and goals

Michalis Klokidis (Greek: Μιχάλης Κλοκίδης, born 23 December 1971) is the all-time scorer in the top four divisions of Greek football. He started and finished his career for Nestos Chrysoupoli.

Klokidis was a player of Levadeiakos between 1996 and 1998, scoring a total of 29 goals in the Beta Ethniki. He then played for ILTEX Lykoi until January 2000 and then Agersani Naxos. In 2000–01 he played for Leonidio, scoring 21 goals for the Sparta-based team in the Gamma Ethniki, and in the following season he played for Kerkyra and helped his team win that season's Gamma Ethniki with 19 goals. He made 36 appearances and scored 18 goals for Thrasyvoulos during 2003–04 Gamma Ethniki season, and in 2003–04 he played for Rodos where he was the top scorer in the Gamma Ethniki with 29 goals.

In the summer of 2004, he was signed by Asteras Tripolis with whom he celebrated 3 club promotions, once to the third division in 2005, once to the second division in 2006 and finally the club's promotion to the Greek Superleague in 2007. He was the top scorer in the 2004–05 season of Delta Ethniki with 39 goals. Until he left the club in 2007 he managed to score 62 goals for the club and 298 career goals so far. For 2007–08 he has transferred to Korinthos who is newly promoted to the Gamma Ethniki. He played for Thessaloniki club Makedonikos during the 2008–09 season and for Nestos Chrysoupoli since the 2009–10 season.
