= Kostas Tsanas =

Greek footballer

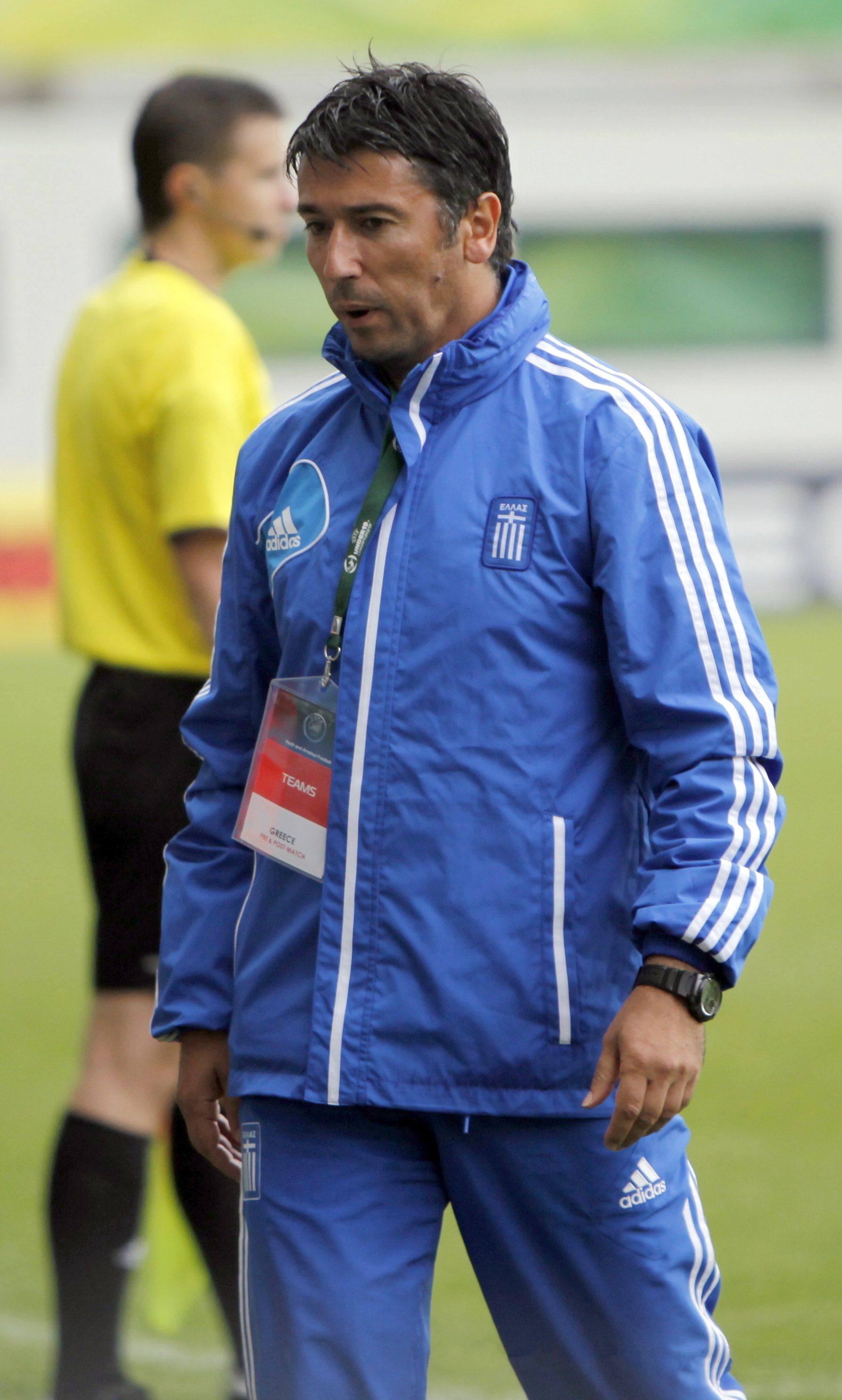

Personal information
- Full name: Konstantinos Tsanas
- Date of birth: 22 August 1967 (age 59)
- Place of birth: Kyriaki, Boeotia, Greece
- Height: 1.72 m (5 ft 8 in)
- Position: Midfielder

Team information
- Current team: Cyprus U21 (Technical Director)

Youth career
- –1985: Levadiakos

Senior career*
Years	Team	Apps	(Gls)
1985–1995	Levadiakos	257	(52)
1995–1996	Kalamata	18	(1)
1996–1999	Athinaikos	43	(2)
1999–2000	Ethnikos Piraeus	14	(0)

Managerial career
- 2001–2005: Athinaikos U19
- 2005–2006: Athinaikos
- 2006–2007: Ilisiakos (Assistant)
- 2007: Ilisiakos
- 2008–2009: AEK Athens (Scout)
- 2009–2010: Greece U19 (Assistant)
- 2010–2011: Greece U21 (Assistant)
- 2011–2012: Greece U19
- 2012–2015: Greece U21
- 2012–2013: Greece U20
- 2014: Greece U19
- 2014: Greece (Caretaker)
- 2015: Greece (Caretaker)
- 2015–2018: Greece (Assistant)
- 2019–2021: AEK Athens (Academies Director)
- 2021–2024: Greek FA (Technical Director)
- 2025–: Cyprus U21 (Technical Director)
- * Club domestic league appearances and goals

Kostas Tsanas (Greek: Κώστας Τσάνας; born 22 August 1967) is a Greek former professional footballer who played as a midfielder. He is the current technical director of the Cyprus U21.

== Playing career ==
He began his career playing for Levadiakos (1985–1995) and was later transferred to Kalamata. He then played for Athinaikos (1996–1999) and finished off that portion of his career with Ethnikos Piraeus. In the 1992–93 season, while playing for Levadiakos, he was the top scorer in the Beta Ethniki (the Greek Second Division) with 14 goals. In total, he played 257 games in the Alpha Ethniki (the Greek First Division) and 75 in the Second Division, scoring 30 and 25 goals, respectively.

== Coaching career ==
In 2001, he began his coaching career with the under-19 side of Athinaikos. His first head coaching experience was in 2005 with Athinaikos, and in 2006 he took charge of Ilisiakos. In 2008-2009, he worked as a scout for AEK Athens.

He went on to join the National team staff as an assistant coach for the U19s and U21s. In October 2011, he took charge of the Greece U19 squad and led them to the finals of the 2012 UEFA European Under-19 Football Championship.

In August 2012, he was named the head coach of the Greece U21 squad.

He has been caretaker coach of the Greece senior team on two occasions. From 2019 to 2021, he was an academy director at AEK Athens football club. In August 2021, Tsanas was appointed technical director of the Hellenic Football Federation. In November 2025, Tsanas was appointed technical director of all the Cyprus Football Association young teams (U21, U19, U17, U16).

=== International ===
Greece U19

- UEFA European Under-19 Championship runner-up: 2012
