= Periklis Papapostolou =

Greek footballer

Personal information
- Full name: Periklis Papapostolou
- Date of birth: 25 September 1975
- Place of birth: Trikala, Greece
- Height: 1.78 m (5 ft 10 in)
- Position: Midfielder

Youth career
- Athinaikos

Senior career*
Years	Team	Apps	(Gls)
1995–1999	Athinaikos	75	(0)
1999–2001	Nafpaktiakos Asteras	60	(15)
2001–2002	Ethnikos Asteras	2	(0)
2002–2004	Kerkyra	66	(7)
2004–2006	Anagennisi Arta	56	(13)
2006–2007	Panetolikos	28	(5)
2007–2008	Diagoras	34	(3)
2008–2009	Panetolikos	28	(3)
2009–2010	Panachaiki	24	(3)
2010–2011	Nafpaktiakos Asteras	31	(9)
- * Club domestic league appearances and goals

Periklis Papapostolou (Greek: Περικλής Παπαποστόλου; born 25 September 1975) is a retired professional football player who played as a midfielder.

He played in the Alpha Ethniki for Athinaikos and Ethnikos Asteras.
