= Apostolos Drakopoulos =

Greek footballer

Personal information
- Date of birth: 11 December 1966 (age 59)
- Position: Forward

Senior career*
Years	Team	Apps	(Gls)
–1985	Achilleas Kamaron		
1985–1987	Panachaiki		
1987–1991	Olympiacos		
1991–1994	Panachaiki		
1994–1997	Olympiakos Nicosia		
1997	AEL		
1998	Olympiacos Volos		
1998–2005	Panegialios		
- * Club domestic league appearances and goals

Apostolos Drakopoulos (Greek: Απόστολος Δρακόπουλος; born 11 December 1966) is a retired Greek football striker.
