= Konstantinos Bantas =

Greek footballer (born 1976)

Personal information
- Full name: Konstantinos Bantas
- Date of birth: 9 July 1976 (age 50)
- Place of birth: Karditsa, Greece
- Height: 1.83 m (6 ft 0 in)
- Position: Defender

Senior career*
Years	Team	Apps	(Gls)
1994–1999	Anagennisi Karditsa	111	(8)
1999–2001	Trikala	45	(3)
2001–2003	Panachaiki	19	(0)
2003–2004	Poseidon Neon Poron	23	(4)
2004–2006	Akratitos	17	(0)
2006–2008	Panetolikos	44	(2)
2008	Trikala	0	(0)
2009–2010	Pyrgetos		
2010–2011	Anagennisi Karditsa	15	(0)
- * Club domestic league appearances and goals

Konstantinos Bantas (Greek: Κωνσταντίνος Μπαντάς; born 9 July 1976) is a Greek former professional footballer who played as a defender.

== Career ==
Bantas began playing football for Anagennisi Karditsa in 1994, where he played over 100 games, scoring eight goals along the way. Bantas left for Trikala in 1999, where he stayed until 2001, when he joined Panachaiki. A spell at AE Poseidon Neon Poron followed in 2003, before he joined Akratitos F.C. in 2004, helping them to achieve promotion to the top flight for 2005. During his career, Bantas has made over 230 first team appearances, although most of his clubs have been outside of the Greek top division.
