= Mauro Silva (footballer, born 1978) =

Brazilian footballer

Personal information
- Full name: Carlos Mauro Pereira da Silva
- Date of birth: 10 August 1978 (age 48)
- Place of birth: Brazil
- Position: Forward

Senior career*
Years	Team	Apps	(Gls)
1995–1996	KFC Eeklo		
1996–1997	FC Naters		
1997–1998	Delémont		
1998–1999	Panathinaikos	20	(4)
1999–2001	OFI	71	(19)
- * Club domestic league appearances and goals

Carlos Mauro Pereira da Silva (born 10 August 1978) also known as Mauro or Mauro Silva is a Brazilian former footballer who played as a forward.

== Career ==
Mauro started his football career in lowly European teams such as KFC Eeklo, FC Naters and Delémont before joining Panathinaikos in 1998, scoring for the Greek club in the UEFA Champions League match against Arsenal.

Mauro joined OFI in 1999, scoring 3 goals for the club during 2000–01 UEFA Cup: twice against Napredak and once against Slavia Prague before being released in 2001.
