= Giorgos Tsifoutis =

Greek footballer

Giorgios Tsifoutis
Personal information
- Date of birth: 14 October 1968 (age 58)
- Position: Midfielder

Youth career
- Nigritas

Senior career*
Years	Team	Apps	(Gls)
1986–1987	Nigritas		
1987–1990	Panserraikos		
1990–1992	Panathinaikos		
1992–1994	OFI		
1994–1995	Ethnikos Piraeus		
1995–1996	Skoda Xanthi		
1996–1998	Panetolikos		
1998	Aiolikos		
1999	Ialysos		
1999–2002	Panserraikos		
2002–2003	Levadiakos		
2003	Nea Artaki		
2004	Kavala		
2004–2005	Visaltiakos		

International career
1989–1990	Greece	2	(0)

Managerial career
- 2005: Panserraikos (caretaker)
- * Club domestic league appearances and goals

Giorgios Tsifoutis (Greek: Γιώργος Τσιφούτης; born 14 October 1968) is a retired Greek football midfielder.
