= Nikaia Municipal Gymnasium =

Football stadium in Nikaia, Greece

Nikaia Municipal Stadium
- Proodeftiki Stadium
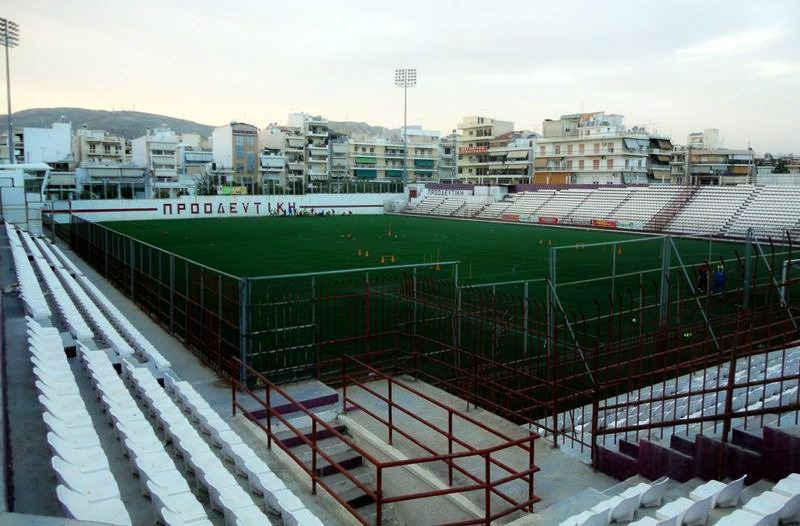
- Interactive map of Nikaia Municipal Stadium
- Location: Nikaia, Attica, Greece
- Coordinates: 37°58′39.888″N 23°39′36.080″E
- Capacity: 4,361
- Public transit: Korydallos Metro Station (June 2019)

Construction
- Opened: 1937
- Renovated: 1992, 2000, 2009

Tenants
- Proodeftiki F.C., Proodeftiki F.C. Youth

The Nikaia Municipal Stadium (Greek: Δημοτικό Γήπεδο Νίκαιας) or simple Nikaia stadium (Greek: γήπεδο Νίκαιας) is a football stadium in the Piraeus suburb of Nikaia.

It is the main playing field for the local Proodeftiki F.C. playing team, and is colloquially known by the name "Proodeftiki Stadium".

It is located 2 km east of the Neapoli Stadium, home of the Proodeftiki's local rival Ionikos F.C.
