= Giannis Chrysafis =

Greek footballer (born 1981)

Personal information
- Full name: Ioannis Chrysafis
- Date of birth: 16 March 1981 (age 45)
- Place of birth: Athens, Greece
- Height: 1.75 m (5 ft 9 in)
- Position: Midfielder

Youth career
- Panathinaikos

Senior career*
Years	Team	Apps	(Gls)
2001–2002	Marko	50	(7)
2003–2004	OFI	26	(0)
2004	Paniliakos	10	(0)
2004–2005	Aris	13	(2)
2005–2007	Levadiakos	46	(6)
2007	Egaleo	9	(4)
2008	Panthrakikos	23	(3)
2008–2010	Panetolikos	32	(7)
2010	AO Trikala	14	(6)
2010	Panachaiki	12	(3)
2011	Panegialios	10	(1)
2011	Chalkida		
2012–2013	Asteras Magoula	36	(17)
2013–2014	Ionikos	22	(10)
2014–2015	Triglia Rafina		
2015–2017	Atlantis F.C. Anthoussa		
2017–2018	Palliniakos	15	(1)
2018–2018	AO Potamia	7	(5)
2018	Irakleio	13	(3)
2019	AO Potamia	11	(6)

International career
2002–2004	Greece U21	10	(0)
- * Club domestic league appearances and goals

Giannis Chrysafis (Greek: Γιάννης Χρυσάφης; born 16 March 1981) is a former Greek footballer who played as a midfielder.
