= Antonis Sapountzis =

Greek footballer

Personal information
- Full name: Antonios Sapountzis
- Date of birth: 19 November 1971 (age 54)
- Place of birth: Edessa, Greece
- Height: 1.85 m (6 ft 1 in)
- Position: Midfielder

Youth career
- –1990: Iraklis Edessis

Senior career*
Years	Team	Apps	(Gls)
1990–1991	Eordaikos		(10)
1991–1992	Edessaikos		
1992–1995	Aris	83	(12)
1995–2000	Panionios	101 (Note: Statistics for the 1996–97 Beta Ethniki season are unavailable.)	(31)
2000–2001	Iraklis	23	(4)
2001–2003	OFI	21	(0)
2003–2004	Kerkyra	7	(0)
2004	Iraklis Edessis		
- * Club domestic league appearances and goals

Antonis Sapountzis (Greek: Αντώνης Σαπουντζής; born 19 November 1971) is a Greek former professional footballer who played as a midfielder.

During his club career, Sapountzis played for Eordaikos, Edessaikos, Aris, Panionios, Iraklis, OFI and Kerkyra.

== Honours ==
Panionios

- Greek Cup: 1997–98
