= Nikos Zapropoulos =

Greek footballer (born 1978)

Personal information
- Full name: Nikolaos Zapropoulos
- Date of birth: 27 July 1978 (age 48)
- Place of birth: Katerini, Greece
- Height: 1.86 m (6 ft 1 in)
- Position: Defender

Youth career
- Kambaniakos

Senior career*
Years	Team	Apps	(Gls)
1997–2006	Skoda Xanthi	145	(6)
2006	→ Anorthosis Famagusta (loan)	7	(0)
2006–2007	Ergotelis	22	(0)
2007–2008	PAS Giannina	21	(2)
2008–2009	Panthrakikos	22	(2)
2009–2010	Thrasyvoulos	11	(0)
2010	Panserraikos	19	(0)
2010–2011	Levadiakos	11	(0)
- * Club domestic league appearances and goals as of 16:00, 20 January 2012 (UTC)

Nikos Zapropoulos (Greek: Νίκος Ζαπρόπουλος; born 27 July 1978) is a Greek footballer who last played for Levadiakos F.C. in the Beta Ethniki.

Zapropoulos began his professional career by signing for Skoda Xanthi in July 1997. He appeared in 145 Alpha Ethniki matches for the club over nine seasons. He also played for Ergotelis and Panthrakikos in the Alpha Ethniki.
