= Vasilios Bletsas =

Greek footballer (born 1975)

Personal information
- Full name: Vasilios Bletsas
- Date of birth: 3 September 1975 (age 51)
- Place of birth: Ioannina, Greece
- Height: 1.82 m (6 ft 0 in)
- Position: Defender

Senior career*
Years	Team	Apps	(Gls)
–1996	PAS Giannina		
1996–1999	Kalamata		
2000	Skoda Xanthi		
2000–2003	PAS Giannina		
2003–2004	Akratitos		
2004–2005	Digenis Morphou		
2005–2007	Acharnaikos		
2007–2008	Koropi		
2008	Anagennisi Karditsa		
2009	Asteras Itea		
2009–2010	Doxa Kranoula		
2010–2012	Kalamata		
- * Club domestic league appearances and goals

Vasilios Bletsas (Greek: Βασίλειος Μπλέτσας; born 3 September 1975) is a retired Greek football defender. (Note: Vasilios Bletsas at WorldFootball.net)
