= Alexandros Tatsis =

Greek footballer

Personal information
- Date of birth: 28 August 1979 (age 47)
- Place of birth: Ioannina, Greece
- Height: 1.90 m (6 ft 3 in)
- Position: Striker

Youth career
- –1996: PAS Giannina

Senior career*
Years	Team	Apps	(Gls)
1996–2001	PAS Giannina	35	(1)
1999–2000	→ Panargiakos (loan)	10	(0)
2001–2003	Proodeftiki	46	(16)
2003–2004	Olympiacos	6	(1)
2005	Proodeftiki	21	(6)
2005	Panachaiki	6	(0)
2006	Proodeftiki	0	(0)
2007	Ethnikos Piraeus	6	(0)
2007–2008	Vyzas		
2008–2009	Proodeftiki		
2009–2010	Doxa Kranoula	1	(0)

Managerial career
- 2024–: PAS Giannina U19
- 2025: PAS Giannina (caretaker)
- * Club domestic league appearances and goals

Alexandros Tatsis or Alekos Tatsis (born 28 August 1979) is s a Greek coach and a former player.

== Career ==
Tatsis signed his first professional contract with PAS Giannina. He joined Proodeftiki F.C. in 2002, and played for the club during the 2002–03 Alpha Ethniki season. In 2003 he joined Olympiacos, but he was released at the end of the season.
