= Hugo Soares (Angolan footballer) =

Angolan footballer

Personal information
- Full name: Hugo César Lopes da Silva Soares
- Date of birth: 15 December 1974 (age 51)
- Place of birth: Luanda, Angola
- Position: Striker

Senior career*
Years	Team	Apps	(Gls)
1995–1996	San José		
1996–1997	Defensa y Justicia		
1997–1998	Atlético Zulia		
1998	Deportivo Pesquero		
1999	Comunicaciones		
1999–2000	Excursionistas		
2000–2001	Skoda Xanthi		
2001–2003	Sporting de Pombal	42	(14)
2004	Sabadell	2	(1)
2005	UO Jiennense		
2006	Sants		
2007–2008	Montblanc		
2008	Torredembarra		
2010–2012	Atlanta (Barcelona)		
- * Club domestic league appearances and goals

Hugo César Lopes da Silva Soares (born 15 December 1974) is an Angolan former football striker.

== Titles ==
Season	Team	Title
1995	San José	Bolivian league
1996–1997	Defensa y Justicia	Primera B Metropolitana
1997	Atlético Zulia	Copa Venezuela
1997–1998	Atlético Zulia	Venezuelan Primera División
