= Houssine Benali =

Moroccan footballer

Personal information
- Full name: Houssine Benali
- Date of birth: 15 August 1969 (age 57)
- Place of birth: Morocco
- Height: 1.73 m (5 ft 8 in)
- Position: Midfielder

Youth career
- Douai

Senior career*
Years	Team	Apps	(Gls)
1989–1990	Douai		
1991–1992	Namur		
1993–1995	Eeklo		
1995–1997	Eendracht Aalst		
1997–1998	Nice	10	(0)
1998–1999	Roeselare		
1999–2001	Ethnikos Asteras	55	(9)
2001	Panionios	8	(3)
2002–2003	Fostiras	19	(5)
2003–2004	Moghreb Tétouan		
- * Club domestic league appearances and goals

Houssine Benali (born 15 August 1969) is a retired Moroccan footballer who played as a midfielder.

Benali began his professional career with Douai, and went on to play for Nice, but only played ten Ligue 2 matches for the club. (Note: Houssine Benali – French league stats at LFP – also available in French (archived)) He moved to Belgium and played for Eendracht Aalst and Roeselare. Benali joined Ethnikos Asteras for the 1999–00 and 2000–01 Greek Alpha Ethniki seasons. He had a brief stint with Panionios during the 2001–02 Alpha Ethniki season, followed by a stint with Fostiras F.C. during the 2002–03 Beta Ethniki season.
