= Nikos Skarmoutsos =

Greek footballer

Personal information
- Full name: Nikolaos Skarmoutsos
- Date of birth: 16 March 1976 (age 50)
- Place of birth: Athens, Greece
- Height: 1.83 m (6 ft 0 in)
- Position: Forward

Youth career
- Panionios

Senior career*
Years	Team	Apps	(Gls)
1996–2000	Marko	57	(11)
2000–2002	Apollon Smyrnis	60	(16)
2002–2003	Panachaiki	20	(2)
2003–2004	Kallithea	29	(12)
2004–2005	PAOK	9	(0)
2005–2006	Atromitos	10	(3)
2006	Aris	13	(3)
2006–2008	Panetolikos	42	(14)
2008–2009	Fostiras	25	(2)
2009–2010	Korinthos	11	(4)
2010	Nea Ionia		
2010–2011	PAOK Glyfadas		(6)
- * Club domestic league appearances and goals

Nikos Skarmoutsos (born 16 March 1976 in Athens, Greece) is a professional football forward. He is currently training the football team of the Athens Bar Association, Solon FC, counting two domestic championships (2015 and 2016). He is also holder of a Union of European Football Associations A diploma and a successful personal trainer, specialized in tactics and technique development.
