= Georgios Strantzalis =

Greek footballer (born in 1969)

Personal information
- Date of birth: 23 April 1969 (age 57)
- Place of birth: Thessaloniki, Greece
- Position: Midfielder

Senior career*
| Years | Team | Apps | (Gls) |
- Iraklis
| 1995–1997 | Paniliakos | | |
| 1997–1998 | Aris | | |
| 1998–1999 | Kavala | | |
| 1999–2000 | Kallithea | | |
| 2000–2004 | Patraikos | | |
| 2004–2005 | Panachaiki | | |
| 2005–2006 | Rodos | | |

Managerial career
- 2006–2007: Rodos
- 2007: Panachaiki
- 2007–2008: Kalamata
- 2008: Ilioupoli
- 2009: Koropi
- 2009: Rodos
- 2010–2011: Rodos
- 2011: Eordaikos
- 2012: Apollon Kalamarias
- 2012–2013: Iraklis
- 2013: Acharnaikos
- 2013–2014: AEL
- 2014–2015: PAO Varda
- * Club domestic league appearances and goals

Georgios Strantzalis (Greek: Γεώργιος Στράντζαλης; born 23 April 1969) is a Greek professional football manager and former player.
