= Konstantinos Papoutsis =

Greek footballer

Personal information
- Full name: Konstantinos Papoutsis
- Date of birth: 31 March 1979 (age 47)
- Place of birth: Athens, Greece
- Position: Defender

Senior career*
Years	Team	Apps	(Gls)
1997–1998	Kerkyra	21	(1)
1998–1999	Panetolikos	21	(1)
1999–2007	Egaleo	94	(4)
2007–2009	Panachaiki	61	(12)
2009–2010	Kalamata	30	(0)
2011	Egaleo	3	(0)
2011–2012	Mandraikos	0	(0)
2012–2018	Egaleo	0	(0)
- * Club domestic league appearances and goals

Konstantinos Papoutsis (Greek: Κωνσταντίνος Παπουτσής; born 31 March 1979) is a Greek footballer.

== Career ==
Born in Athens, Papoutsis began playing professional football with Greek third division side Kerkyra in 1997. He also played for Egaleo in the Super League Greece.
