= Georgios Diamantis (footballer) =

Greek footballer

Personal information
- Date of birth: 30 January 1979 (age 47)
- Place of birth: Argos, Greece
- Height: 1.92 m (6 ft 4 in)
- Position: Defender

Senior career*
Years	Team	Apps	(Gls)
–1998	Panargiakos		
1998–2003	Apollon Smyrnis		
2003–2005	Ionikos		
2005–2006	Kerkyra		
2006–2007	Panetolikos		
2007–2008	Agios Dimitrios		
2008	Panachaiki		
2009	Ethnikos Piraeus		
2009	Aittitos Spata		
2010	Panegialios		
2010–2011	Keravnos Keratea		
- * Club domestic league appearances and goals

Georgios Diamantis (Greek: Γεώργιος Διαμαντής; born 30 January 1979) is a retired Greek football defender.
