= Michalis Chatzis =

Greek footballer (born 1978)

Personal information
- Date of birth: 4 September 1978 (age 48)
- Place of birth: Athens, Greece
- Height: 1.76 m (5 ft 9 1/2 in)
- Position: Midfielder

Senior career*
Years	Team	Apps	(Gls)
1997–2002	Apollon Athens		
2002–2007	Egaleo	23	(0)
2005–2006	→ Kerkyra (loan)		
2007–2008	Kavala		
2008–2009	Ilioupoli		
2009–2010	Kalamata		
2011	Ionikos	9	(0)
- * Club domestic league appearances and goals

Michalis Chatzis (Greek: Μιχάλης Χατζής; born 4 September 1978) is a Greek former professional footballer who played as a midfielder.

== Career ==
Born in Athens, Chatzis previously played for Egaleo in the Super League Greece.
