= Miloš Dabić =

Serbian footballer

Personal information
- Date of birth: 14 November 1969 (age 56)
- Place of birth: Kragujevac, SFR Yugoslavia
- Position: Striker

Youth career
- Radnički Kragujevac

Senior career*
| Years | Team | Apps | (Gls) |
| 1990–1991 | Spartak Subotica | 20 | (1) |
| 1991–1992 | Rad | 26 | (2) |
| 1992–1994 | Pannafpliakos | 49 | (33) |
| 1994–1996 | Athinaikos | 56 | (9) |
| 1997–1998 | Trikala | 41 | (15) |
| 1998–2000 | Lykoi | 49 | (25) |
| 2000–2001 | Kavala | | |
| 2001–2002 | Kilkisiakos | | |
| 2002–2003 | Kassandra | | |
| Total | | 241 | (85) |
- * Club domestic league appearances and goals

Miloš Dabić (Serbian Cyrillic: Милош Дабић; born 14 November 1969) is a Serbian former footballer who played as a striker.

== Career ==
After starting out at Radnički Kragujevac, Dabić played for Spartak Subotica in the 1990–91 Yugoslav First League (scoring one goal in 20 appearances), but moved to Rad during the season (7 games played). He recorded another 19 appearances and scored two goals for Rad in the 1991–92 Yugoslav First League, before moving abroad. Subsequently, Dabić spent over a decade playing in Greece for Pannafpliakos, Athinaikos, Trikala, Lykoi, Kavala, Kilkisiakos and Kassandra.
