= Vangelis Kaounos =

Greek footballer

Personal information
- Full name: Evangelos Kaounos
- Date of birth: 29 October 1977 (age 48)
- Place of birth: Arta, Greece
- Height: 1.90 m (6 ft 3 in)
- Position: Centre forward

Senior career*
Years	Team	Apps	(Gls)
1996–1998	Anagennisi Arta	47	(9)
1998–2001	Kozani	57	(21)
2001–2004	Skoda Xanthi	32	(4)
2002–2003	→ Ethnikos Asteras (loan)	19	(0)
2003–2004	→ Kallithea (loan)	24	(5)
2004–2006	PAS Giannina	49	(28)
2006–2008	Kalamata	73	(35)
2008–2010	Asteras Tripolis	29	(7)
2010–2011	Panetolikos	19	(5)
2011–2012	Ethnikos Asteras	3	(1)
2012	AEL	19	(6)
2012	Kalamata	5	(1)
Total		376	(122)
- * Club domestic league appearances and goals as of August 2015

Vangelis Kaounos (Greek: Βαγγέλης Καούνος; born 29 October 1977) is a Greek former professional footballer.

== Career ==
Born in Arta, Kaounos previously played for Skoda Xanthi and Kallithea in the Alpha Ethniki. He also played for Ethnikos Asteras, PAS Giannina, Kalamata F.C., Asteras Tripolis, Panetolikos and AEL.
