= Ioannis Thomaidis =

Greek Opponent Analysis

GiannisThomaidis
Personal information
- Full name: Ioannis Thomaidis
- Date of birth: 29 February 1972 (age 54)
- Place of birth: Florina, Greece
- Height: 1.87 m (6 ft 2 in)
- Position: Forward

Team information
- Current team: PAOK FC (Opponent Analysis)

Youth career
- 1986–1989: PAS Florina

Senior career*
Years	Team	Apps	(Gls)
1989–1992	Eordaikos	0	(0)
1992–1993	Panathinaikos	1	(0)
1993–1994	Doxa Drama	27	(7)
1994–1996	OFI	27	(2)
1996–1997	Panathinaikos	10	(0)
1997–1998	Apollon Athens	19	(3)
1998–2000	Veria	51	(7)
2000–2001	Ethnikos Asteras	20	(2)
2001–2004	Paniliakos	77	(25)
2004–2005	Anagennisi Arta	0	(0)
2005–2006	Kastoria	14	(3)
2006	Veria	11	(1)
2006–2007	PAONE	0	(0)
2007–2008	Makedonikos	0	(0)
2008–2009	Aetos Skydra	0	(0)
2009–2010	Makedonikos	0	(0)
Total		257	(50)

Managerial career
- 2014: Platanias (assistant)
- 2015: Platanias (caretaker)
- 2015–2016: PAOK U19 (assistant)
- 2016–2017: PAOK (assistant)
- 2017–2021: PAOK (Opponent analysis)
- 2021–2023: PAOK B (Opponent analysis)
- 2023–: PAOK (Opponent analysis)
- * Club domestic league appearances and goals

Ioannis "Giannis" Thomaidis (Greek: Ιωάννης "Γιάννης" Θωμαΐδης; born 29 February 1972) is a Greek Opponent Analysis of PAOK. He was born in Florina, Greece. He has also followed seminars on video analysis and has also earned the coaching diplomas of UEFA, making it to the UEFA Pro.
