= Predrag Mitić =

Serbian footballer

Personal information
- Date of birth: 30 August 1969 (age 57)
- Place of birth: SFR Yugoslavia
- Position: Striker

Senior career*
Years	Team	Apps	(Gls)
1989–1990	OFK Beograd	5	(0)
1992–1995	EAR Rethymno	83	(40)
1995–2000	OFI	132	(21)
2000–2001	Athinaikos	22	(4)
2001–2002	Agios Nikolaos		
Total		242	(65)
- * Club domestic league appearances and goals

Predrag Mitić (Serbian Cyrillic: Предраг Митић; born 30 August 1969) is a Serbian former footballer who played as a striker.

== Career ==
Mitić played for OFK Beograd in Yugoslavia, before moving abroad to Greece. He spent a decade playing for EAR Rethymno, OFI, Athinaikos and Agios Nikolaos.
