= Nikos Sakellaridis =

Greek footballer

Personal information
- Full name: Nikolaos Sakellaridis
- Date of birth: 30 September 1970 (age 56)
- Place of birth: Thessaloniki, Greece
- Height: 1.74 m (5 ft 9 in)
- Position: Defender

Senior career*
Years	Team	Apps	(Gls)
1988–1992	Makedonikos		
1992–1996	Iraklis		
1997–1998	Apollon Smyrnis		
1999	Veria		
1999–2002	Panionios		
2002–2003	PAS Giannina		
2003–2004	Kassandra		
2004–2005	Veria		
2005–2008	Agrotikos Asteras		
2009–2010	Makedonikos		

International career
1995–1996	Greece	6	(0)

Managerial career
- 2013: Anagennisi Epanomi
- * Club domestic league appearances and goals

Nikos Sakellaridis (Greek: Νίκος Σακελλαρίδης; born 30 September 1970) is a retired Greek football defender.
