= Thomas Troupkos =

Greek footballer (born in 1973)

Personal information
- Date of birth: 2 December 1973 (age 52)
- Place of birth: Monospita, Greece
- Height: 1.84 m (6 ft 0 in)
- Position: Forward

Senior career*
Years	Team	Apps	(Gls)
–1998	Veria		
1998–2001	Kalamata		
2001–2003	Apollon Kalamarias		
2003	Kavala		
2004	Kastoria		
2004–2005	Akratitos		
2005–2006	Doxa Drama		
2006–2007	Panachaiki		
2007–2008	Anagennisi Karditsa		
2008–2009	Niki Polygyros		
2009–2010	Naoussa		
2010–2011	Lefkadia		
- * Club domestic league appearances and goals

Thomas Troupkos (Greek: Θωμάς Τρούπκος; born 2 December 1973) is a retired Greek football striker.
