= Georgios Kiourkos =

Greek footballer (born 1971)

Personal information
- Full name: Georgios Kiourkos
- Date of birth: 15 September 1971 (age 55)
- Place of birth: Athens, Greece
- Height: 1.82 m (6 ft 0 in)
- Position: Forward

Senior career*
Years	Team	Apps	(Gls)
–1993	Chaidari		
1993–1994	Kalamata		
1994–1999	Kallithea		
1999	Panionios		
2000	Leonidio		
2000–2001	Ethnikos Asteras		
2001–2002	Ethnikos Piraeus		
2002–2006	Chaidari		
2006–2007	Themistoklis Egaleo		
- * Club domestic league appearances and goals

Georgios Kiourkos (Greek: Γεώργιος Κιούρκος; born 15 September 1971) is a retired Greek footballer who played primarily as a striker.
