= Ilias Michelidis =

Greek footballer

Personal information
- Date of birth: 29 June 1976 (age 50)
- Position: Midfielder

Senior career*
Years	Team	Apps	(Gls)
1996–2001	Kavala		
2001	Trikala		
2002–?	Ethnikos Asteras		
2003–?	Doxa Drama		
2005–?	Aiolikos		
2006–?	Paniliakos		
- * Club domestic league appearances and goals

Ilias Michelidis (Greek: ηλίας μιχελιδης; born 29 June 1976) is a retired Greek football midfielder.
