= Patraikos F.C. =

Disbanded association football club in Greece

Patraïkos P.A.S.
- Full name: Πατραϊκός Ποδοσφαιρικός Αθλητικός Σύλλογος; Patraïkos Podosfairikos Athlitikos Syllogos; (Patraic Football Sporting Club)
- Founded: 1993; 33 years ago as Panathinaïkos Skagiopouleiou Patron
- Dissolved: 2004; 22 years ago merged with Panachaiki F.C.
- Ground: Prosfygika Stadium
- Capacity: 5,000

Patraïkos Podosfairikos Athlitikos Syllogos (Greek: Πατραϊκός Ποδοσφαιρικός Αθλητικός Σύλλογος, lit. 'Patraic Football Sporting Club') was a Greek association football club based in Patras, Greece.

== History ==
Patraïkos P.A.S. was a club of Patras, which was active in association football. They were founded in 1993 as Panathinaïkos Skagiopouleiou Patron (Greek: Παναθηναϊκός Σκαγιοπουλείου Πατρών, lit. 'Patras Skagiopouleio Panathenaic') from friends of Panathinaikos A.O. in Skagiopouleio and with Stathis Moutzouroulias as president. They belonged to the force of Achaea F.C.A., had the colors green and white and emblem the clover. Initially, they used the stadium of Ladopoulou, Patras as its headquarters. In 4 years they achieved 2 ascents and in 1999 they won the Achaea F.C.A. Championship.

In 2000, they were renamed Patraïkos P.A.S., changing colors from green to blue, with a new brand the lighthouse (a symbol of Patras) and with a new home venue the Prosfygika Stadium. Successive promotions led to participation until the Beta Ethniki, and after three years in Beta Ethniki (2001–2004) they absorbed their compatriot Panachaiki F.C.. The purpose was to write off her serious financial debts, so the two clubs founded as the Panachaiki 2005 by amending the statutes of Patraïkos.

== Honours ==
- Gamma Ethniki
  - Winners (1): 2000–01
- Delta Ethniki
  - Winners (1): 1999–2000
- Achaea F.C.A. Championship
  - Winners (1): 1998–99 (as Panathinaïkos Skagiopouleiou Patron)
- Achaea F.C.A. Cup
  - Winners (1): 1999–2000
