= Prosfygika Stadium =

Football stadium in Patras, Greece

Prosfygika Γήπεδο Προσφυγικών Gipedo Prosfygikon
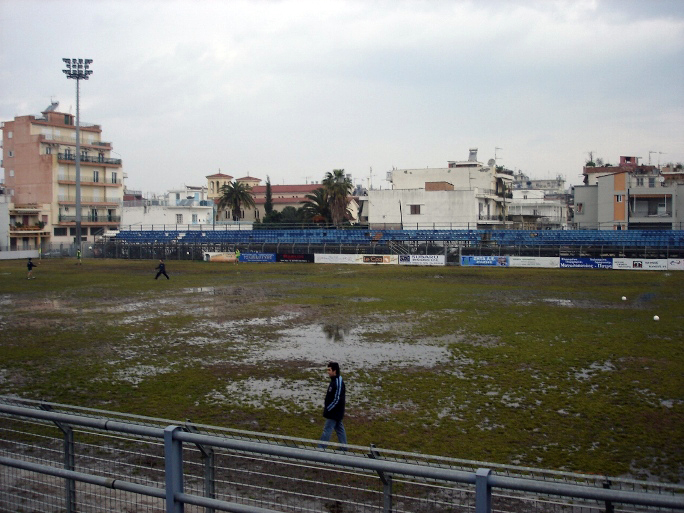
- Interactive map of Prosfygika; Γήπεδο Προσφυγικών; Gipedo Prosfygikon
- Location: Patras, Greece
- Coordinates: 38°14′1″N 21°44′31″E
- Owner: EPS Patras
- Capacity: 5,000

Construction
- Opened: 1922

Prosfygika Stadium (Greek: Γήπεδο Προσφυγικών, Gipedo Prosfygikon) is a football (soccer) stadium in Patras, Greece. It is named after its first refugees that arrived from Asia Minor in 1922, a region now part of Turkey, following the Greco-Turkish Population Exchange. From 1925, it is used for the teams Thyella, AS Apollo and Olympiacos and Aris.

From 1923, after the creation of Olympiacos, the stadium was constructed with owned properties inside the residents of the refugees near Agia Foteini. The construction were all straws which cleaned the refugees and their face of work became a field in which it is the oldest in Patras and one of the oldest in Greece, the stadium of Olympiacos (no relation of Olympiacos in Piraeus but it has the same logo) which said until 1964 the stadium became a part of the EPS Achaia. In this field had played all of the teams in Patreas and participated in the second, third and fourth national divisions. Their first game happened on October 17, 1927, in a friendly match, Olympiacos Patras - Olympiacos Athens 4-1 (halftime score: 3–0). The field was used for sheltering during the Greek Civil War in 1947 and were used until 1984 and built subdivisions with the power of EPS Patras.

== Sources ==
The first version of this article has been based in the text of el:Γήπεδο Προσφυγικών of the Greek Wikipedia published under the GFDL.
