= Giorgos Papandreou =

Greek footballer

Personal information
- Full name: Georgios Papandreou
- Date of birth: 12 February 1969 (age 57)
- Place of birth: Pyrgos Fthiotis, Greece
- Height: 1.91 m (6 ft 3 in)
- Position: Striker

Senior career*
Years	Team	Apps	(Gls)
1988–1993	Charavgiakos	146	(34)
1993–1995	Kalamata	32	(4)
1995–1998	Kavala	76	(27)
1998–1999	Paniliakos	33	(8)
1999	Ethnikos	13	(12)
2000–2001	Athinaikos	35	(19)
2001	Montréal Impact	15	(9)
2001–2002	Ethnikos Asteras	11	(1)
2002–2003	Digenis Morphou	25	(22)
2003	APOEL	12	(3)
2003–2005	Doxa Drama	22	(8)
2005	Olympiakos Nicosia	6	(3)
2005–2006	PAE Thraki	33	(10)
2006	Kavala	15	(8)
- * Club domestic league appearances and goals

Giorgos Papandreou (born 12 February 1969) is a retired Greek footballer who played for several clubs in Super League Greece (Kavala, Paniliakos, Athinaikos, Ethnikos Asteras and Kalamata) and Cypriot First Division (Digenis Morphou and APOEL). He also played for years in Beta Ethniki and Gamma Ethniki. He was a powerful striker.
