= Stavros Labriakos =

Greek footballer

Personal information
- Date of birth: 30 November 1975 (age 50)
- Place of birth: Thessaloniki, Greece
- Height: 1.93 m (6 ft 4 in)
- Positions: Striker; centre-back

Youth career
- 1990–1993: Aris

Senior career*
Years	Team	Apps	(Gls)
1993–1995	Aris	25	(2)
1995–2001	Apollon Athens	130	(33)
2001–2009	Skoda Xanthi	167	(32)
2009–2010	Aris	21	(0)
Total		343	(67)
- * Club domestic league appearances and goals as of 21 June 2010

Stavros Labriakos (Greek: Σταύρος Λαμπριάκος; born 30 November 1975) is a Greek football player who started and ended his career playing for Aris. Labriakos retired in the summer of 2010.
