= Leonidio F.C. =

Association football club in Greece

Leonidio
- Full name: Athlitikos Syllogos Leonidio
- Founded: 1969; 57 years ago
- Ground: Leonidio Municipal Stadium
- Capacity: 1,000
- Chairman: Konstantinos Diamantis
- Manager: Giannis Mitrousis
- League: Arcadia FCA First Division
- 2025–26: Arcadia FCA First Division, 5th
- Website: Official website

Leonidio Football Club (Greek: Αθλητικός Σύλλογος Λεωνιδίου) is a Greek football club, based in Leonidio, Arcadia. The club's colors are red and white.

== History ==
Officially founded in 1969, Athletic Club Leonidio "To Leonidion" was formed through the merger of two pre-existing clubs: Leonidas (founded in 1932) and P.A.O. Leonidion (founded in 1959).

Since its foundation in 1969, the club has won 8 Arcadia FCA championships, 10 Arcadia FCA cups and 1 Arcadia FCA Super Cup. It won its most recent cup in 2019, while in 2017 it achieved the domestic double. In 1999, the club won its group title in the Delta Ethniki, and from 1999 to 2004 it competed in the Gamma Ethniki under the corporate name "P.A.E. A.S. to Leonidion".

From 2004, it played in the Delta Ethniki until its relegation in the spring of 2009. From 2009 to 2017, the club competed in the Arcadia FCA First Division. In 2017, Leonidio earned promotion back to the Gamma Ethniki. Since 2018, it has been competing in the top local division of the Arcadia Football Clubs Association.

Leonidio defeated Ermis Meligou 1–0 in the big derby of matchday 24 in the Arcadia FCA championship, mathematically securing the 2022–23 Arcadia championship title two matchdays before the end of the season. This was followed by the capture of the club's first Arcadia FCA Super Cup in 2023, following a 2–0 victory over Dimitsana.

== Stadium ==
Leonidio Municipal Stadium features a main stand with a seating capacity of approximately 1,000 spectators, while during major Gamma Ethniki matches (with standing spectators around the perimeter) attendance has exceeded 1,500 fans. The facility is equipped with a modern, high-quality, latest-generation artificial turf pitch. Furthermore, the stadium features six large floodlight towers, providing full coverage for hosting night matches and evening training sessions in accordance with Hellenic Football Federation specifications.

== Honours ==
=== Domestic ===
- Delta Ethniki
  - Winners (1): 1998–99
- Arcadia FCA League
  - Winners (8): 1971–72, 1973–74, 1981–82, 1983–84, 1990–91, 1996–97, 2016–17, 2022–23
- Arcadia FCA Cup
  - Winners (10): 1973–74, 1976–77, 1979–80, 1984–85, 1990–91, 1997–98, 1998–99, 2007–08, 2016–17, 2018–19
- Arcadia Super FCA Cup
  - Winners (1): 2023
