= Lefteris Velentzas =

Greek manager and former footballer

Personal information
- Full name: Eleftherios Velentzas
- Date of birth: 10 October 1970 (age 56)
- Place of birth: Athens, Greece
- Height: 1.65 m (5 ft 5 in)
- Position: Midfielder

Youth career
- –1989: O.F. Neas Ionias

Senior career*
Years	Team	Apps	(Gls)
1989–1998	Apollon Smyrnis	182	(25)
1998–1999	Iraklis	27	(4)
1999–2003	Akratitos	35	(13)
2003	Egaleo	12	(1)
2003–2005	Thrasyvoulos		
2005–2007	Agioi Anargyroi		
2007–2008	Ilioupoli		
2008	Agia Paraskevi		
2008–2009	Nea Ionia		

International career
1995	Greece	1	(0)

Managerial career
- 2018: Apollon Smyrnis (caretaker)
- 2018–2019: Apollon Smyrnis U20
- 2019: Apollon Smyrnis
- 2022: Apollon Smyrnis (caretaker)
- 2022: Apollon Smyrnis (assistant)
- 2022–2023: Rouf U19
- 2022: Rouf (caretaker)
- 2024: Iraklis (assistant)
- 2024: Iraklis (caretaker)
- 2024: Iraklis (assistant)
- * Club domestic league appearances and goals

Lefteris Velentzas (Greek: Λευτέρης Βελέντζας; born 10 October 1970) is a Greek professional football manager and former player.
