= ILTEX Lykoi F.C. =

Disbanded association football club in Greece

ILTEX Lykoi
- Full name: Αθλητικός Σύλλογος Βιοτεχνών «Λύκοι–Δίας» Αμπελοκήπων Θεσσαλονίκης; Athlitikos Syllogos Viotechnon "Lykoi–Dias" Ampelokipon Thessalonikis; (Thessaloniki Ampelokipoi Craftsmen Sporting Club "Wolves–Zeus")
- Founded: 1982; 44 years ago
- Dissolved: 2005; 21 years ago
- Ground: Stadium "Stelios Iliadis", Kalochori, Thessaloniki
- Capacity: 8,368
- Owner: ILTEX S.A. (historic)
- President: Kostas Iliadis (historic)

Athlitikos Syllogos Viotechnon "Lykoi–Dias" Ampelokipon Thessalonikis (Greek: Αθλητικός Σύλλογος Βιοτεχνών «Λύκοι–Δίας» Αμπελοκήπων Θεσσαλονίκης, lit. 'Thessaloniki Ampelokipoi Craftsmen Sporting Club "Wolves–Zeus"'), also known as ILTEX Lykoi (Greek: ΗΛΤΕΞ Λύκοι), was a Greek association football club based in Ampelokipoi, Thessaloniki, Greece. The club was owned by the Greek businessman Kostas Iliadis.

== History ==
=== ILTEX Lykoi (1982–2005) ===
Iliadis was the owner of a group of companies that consisted of ILTEX Lykoi, Knitting Mills of Pieria, ILTEX S.A, Dyeing Industry of Sindos S.A, Dyeing Industry of Kilkis S.A, ILTEX Construction company S.A, with a total turnover of €70,000,000 and 900 people staff. Iliadis group of companies was the most important textile company in Greece for more than a decade (1990–2003).

In 2004 the problems of reduced demand, inadequate financing from banks to textile industry, forced Iliadis to bankruptcy and the football club merged with the team Anagennisi Epanomi. The most important highlight in the team's history was the participation in Greek Second division in the late 1990s. On Sunday August 9, 2009, Iliadis and his friend Emmanouil Tsakiropoulos (also a former agent of the amateur team Anagennisi Terpsitheas) were killed in a car accident that took place on the 479th kilometre of the Athens–Thessaloniki (A1/A2) motorway, near the bridge of the river Loudias. He was 59 years old.

=== YLTEX Lykoi Thessalonikis (2022–2025) ===
YLTEX Lykoi Thessalonikis logo (2022–2025)

In 2022, a group of young officials decided to get involved with the club and revive it, wishing for the old and glorious times to return in the near future. Among the goals they aim to achieve are to create a football-friendly atmosphere with respect to the team's history, the establishment of an academy network at a future stage, while they also hope to compete one day at the legendary Stadium "Stelios Iliadis" in Kalochori.

In December of that year, the launch of this effort was officially announced, with journalist Giorgos Sideridis appointed as president, and Stavros Intachosa, Ilias Thouliotis, and Vasilis Manolakis as members of the board of directors. The club was re-established under the name YLTEX Lykoi Thessalonikis (Greek: ΥΛΤΕΞ Λύκοι Θεσσαλονίκης).

In the 2023–24 season, the team started from scratch, specifically from the C Division of the Macedonia F.C.A., with Gerasimos Kantas initially serving as coach, followed by Grigoris Kavalieratos. That year, the historic club reached the round of 32 in the Macedonia F.C.A. Cup and also won the championship in its group.

Due to lack of funds, the reestablished team declared bankruptcy in summer 2025 and did not declare participation in the following championship season.

== Badge ==
The club's badge featured a wolf head in black color.

== Title sponsor ==
ILTEX company was the team's title sponsor. It stand for IliadisTextile and was the company owned by the club's president.

== Stadium "Stelios Iliadis" ==
Stadium "Stelios Iliadis"
- Interactive map of Stadium "Stelios Iliadis"
- Location: Kalochori, Thessaloniki
- Coordinates: 40°39′07″N 22°51′17″E
- Operator: ILTEX Lykoi
- Capacity: 8,368

Construction
- Opened: 1 January 1996; 30 years ago
- Closed: 2005

Tenant
- ILTEX Lykoi (1996–2005)

Kostas Iliadis had pioneering ideas. Among others he had hired nutrition experts for the player's diet, who later published their experiences at the club. The biggest contribution was the construction of a modern Football Ground in Kalohori. It was launched in October 1996 and in its final form had a capacity of 8,368 seated spectators, had roofed stands, grass, lights and modern training facilities, comparable to those of teams of 1st National. The historic ILTEX Lykoi stadium has fallen in a complete state of abandonment and disrepair. The reestablished club was using the Mikra Stadium in Kalamaria.
