= 2001–02 Greek Football Cup =

2001–02 Greek Cup
Tournament details
- Country: Greece
- Teams: 44

Final positions
- Champions: AEK Athens (13th title)
- Runners-up: Olympiacos

Tournament statistics
- Matches played: 173
- Goals scored: 525 (3.03 per match)
- Top goal scorer(s): Alexis Alexandris (11 goals)

The 2001–02 Greek Football Cup was the 60th edition of the Greek Football Cup.

== Calendar ==
Round	Date(s)	Fixtures	Clubs	New entries
Group stage	4–8, 11–13, 15, 17–20, 26, 29, 30 August, 5, 8–10, 16 September, 3, 10, 11 October & 7, 8 November 2001	132	44 → 22	44
Second Round	28 November, 19 December 2001	12	22 → 16	none
Round of 16	9, 17 January 2002	16	16 → 8	none
Quarter-finals	30 January, 6 February 2002	8	8 → 4	none
Semi-finals	13 March, 10 April 2002	4	4 → 2	none
Final	27 April 2002	1	2 → 1	none

== Group stage ==
=== Group 1 ===
Pos	Team	Pld	W	D	L	GF	GA	GD	Pts	Qualification	AEK	EGA	PNS	NAF
1	AEK Athens	6	5	1	0	25	7	+18	16	Second Round		2–0	5–0	4–0
2	Egaleo	6	2	3	1	10	8	+2	9	Second Round	3–3		0–0	3–1
3	Panserraikos	6	2	2	2	7	12	−5	8		1–5	1–1		2–1
4	Nafpaktiakos Asteras	6	0	0	6	6	21	−15	0		3–6	1–3	0–3	

Source: epo.gr
6 August 2001
18:15 EEST

Panserraikos	1–5	AEK Athens
Chibuzor 84'	Report (page 1)	Navas 32'; Tsiartas 36', 76', 88'; Ferrugem 47'

Serres Municipal Stadium, Serres
Referee: Giannis Bisogiannis (Thessaloniki)
8 August 2001
13:00 EEST

Egaleo	3–1	Nafpaktiakos Asteras
Nikolopoulos 3'; Makris 55', 59'	Report (page 1)	Kyparissis 7'

Stavros Mavrothalassitis Stadium, Aigaleo

13 August 2001
13:00 EEST

Egaleo	0–0	Panserraikos
	Report (page 1)

Stavros Mavrothalassitis Stadium, Aigaleo
29 August 2001
17:00 EEST

Nafpaktiakos Asteras	3–6	AEK Athens
Loukopoulos 18'; Zapantiotis 70'; Kyparissis 76'	Report (page 1-2)	Nikolaidis 7', 31' (pen.), 51', 63', 73'; Zagorakis 67'

Papacharalambeio National Stadium, Nafpaktos
Referee: Giorgos Douros (Corinthia)

19 August 2001
13:00 EEST

Panserraikos	2–1	Nafpaktiakos Asteras
Moutidis 63'; Tsifoutis 75'	Report (page 2)	Jovanović 7'

Serres Municipal Stadium, Serres
19 August 2001
19:00 EEST

AEK Athens	2–0	Egaleo
Zikos 55'; Tsiartas 60' (pen.)	Report (page 2)

Nikaia Municipal Stadium, Nikaia
Referee: Christoforos Zografos (Athens)

26 August 2001
21:00 EEST

AEK Athens	5–0	Panserraikos
Maladenis 29'; Konstantinidis 39', 61'; Lakis 63'; Petkov 70'	Report (page 2)

Nikos Goumas Stadium, Nea Filadelfeia
Attendance: 3,000
Referee: Iraklis Tsikinis (Messinia)
26 August 2001
13:00 EEST

Nafpaktiakos Asteras	1–3	Egaleo
Meidanis 53' (o.g.)	Report (page 2)	Agritis 32'; Chloros 51'; Makris 87'

Papacharalambeio National Stadium, Nafpaktos

8 September 2001
13:00 EEST

Panserraikos	1–1	Egaleo
Chibuzor 14'	Report (page 3)	Papoutsis 76'

Serres Municipal Stadium, Serres
11 October 2001
20:00 EEST

AEK Athens	4–0	Nafpaktiakos Asteras
Kola 14'; Kostis 35'; Kosandianos 39' (o.g.); Maladenis 47'	Report (page 3)

Nikos Goumas Stadium, Nea Filadelfeia
Attendance: 287
Referee: Pavlos Papilias (Piraeus)

7 November 2001
15:30 EET

Egaleo	3–3	AEK Athens
Makris 55', 59'; Nikolopoulos 58'	Report (page 3)	Trichias 8'; Kola 34'; Maladenis 79'

Nikaia Municipal Stadium, Nikaia
Referee: Giorgos Kasnaferis (Athens)
7 November 2001
13:00 EET

Nafpaktiakos Asteras	0–3	Panserraikos
	Report (page 3)	Panagiotidis 35', 37', 67'

Papacharalambeio National Stadium, Nafpaktos

=== Group 2 ===
Pos	Team	Pld	W	D	L	GF	GA	GD	Pts	Qualification	ETA	KER	APA	KAV
1	Ethnikos Asteras	6	5	1	0	13	3	+10	16	Second Round		3–1	2–1	1–0
2	Kerkyra	6	3	1	2	6	7	−1	10	Second Round	1–3		1–0	2–1
3	Apollon Athens	6	1	3	2	4	4	0	6		0–0	0–0		2–0
4	Kavala	6	0	1	5	2	11	−9	1		0–4	0–1	1–1	

Source: epo.gr
5 August 2001
13:00 EEST

Apollon Athens	0–0	Ethnikos Asteras
	Report (page 4)

Rizoupoli Stadium, Rizoupoli
5 August 2001
13:00 EEST

Kerkyra	2–1	Kavala
Karaisaridis 75'; Vandelannoite 89'	Report (page 4)	Karipidis 24' (pen.)

Kerkyra Stadium, Corfu

12 August 2001
13:00 EEST

Kavala	0–4	Ethnikos Asteras
	Report (page 4)	Arvanitidis 3' (o.g.); Podaras 21'; Tsalikis 23'; Papadimitriou 79'

Anthi Karagianni Stadium, Kavala
12 August 2001
13:00 EEST

Kerkyra	1–0	Apollon Athens
Korobokis 73'	Report (page 4-5)

Kerkyra Stadium, Corfu

19 August 2001
13:00 EEST

Apollon Athens	2–0	Kavala
Dedakis 22'; Tonković 55'	Report (page 5)

Rizoupoli Stadium, Rizoupoli
20 August 2001
13:00 EEST

Ethnikos Asteras	3–1	Kerkyra
Papadimitriou 23'; Basinas 28'; Kontopoulos 30'	Report (page 5)	Konstantinidis 34'

Michalis Kritikopoulos Stadium, Kaisariani

26 August 2001
13:00 EEST

Kavala	0–1	Kerkyra
	Report (page 5)	Stylos 87'

Anthi Karagianni Stadium, Kavala
26 August 2001
13:00 EEST

Ethnikos Asteras	2–1	Apollon Athens
Kontopoulos 23'; Papadimitriou 25'	Report (page 5)	M. Chatzis 89'

Michalis Kritikopoulos Stadium, Kaisariani

9 September 2001
13:00 EEST

Ethnikos Asteras	1–0	Kavala
Papadimitriou 44'	Report (page 6)

Michalis Kritikopoulos Stadium, Kaisariani
10 September 2001
13:00 EEST

Apollon Athens	0–0	Kerkyra
	Report (page 6)

Rizoupoli Stadium, Rizoupoli

16 September 2001
13:00 EEST

Kerkyra	1–3	Ethnikos Asteras
Klokidis 44' (pen.)	Report (page 6)	Bandović 23'; Papapostolou 39'; Papadimitriou 86'

Kerkyra Stadium, Corfu
16 September 2001
13:00 EEST

Kavala	1–1	Apollon Athens
Salpingidis 54'	Report (page 6)	Vourexakis 49'

Anthi Karagianni Stadium, Kavala

=== Group 3 ===
Pos	Team	Pld	W	D	L	GF	GA	GD	Pts	Qualification	OFI	ION	ATR	PNI
1	OFI	6	5	1	0	18	6	+12	16	Second Round		4–0	6–1	1–1
2	Ionikos	6	2	1	3	7	9	−2	7	Second Round	0–1		1–2	4–2
3	Atromitos	6	2	0	4	8	14	−6	6		2–3	0–2		2–0
4	Paniliakos	6	1	2	3	7	11	−4	5		2–3	0–0	2–1	

Source: epo.gr
8 August 2001
13:00 EEST

Paniliakos	0–0	Ionikos
	Report (page 7)

Pyrgos Stadium, Pyrgos
15 August 2001
13:00 EEST

OFI	6–1	Atromitos
Soares 40', 61'; Nioplias 44'; Kiassos 51'; Muñoz 69'; Tzanetis 87'	Report (page 7)	Georgiev 20'

Theodoros Vardinogiannis Stadium, Heraklion

11 August 2001
13:00 EEST

OFI	1–1	Paniliakos
Digozis 84'	Report (page 7)	Karkaletsis 75'

Theodoros Vardinogiannis Stadium, Heraklion
12 August 2001
13:00 EEST

Atromitos	0–2	Ionikos
	Report (page 7-8)	Curbelo 10'; Moustakis 11' (o.g.)

Peristeri Stadium, Peristeri

18 August 2001
13:00 EEST

Ionikos	0–1	OFI
	Report (page 8)	Kiassos 29'

Neapoli Stadium, Nikaia
19 August 2001
13:00 EEST

Paniliakos	2–1	Atromitos
Tsigas 70'; Diarra 80' (pen.)	Report (page 8)	Kalimeris 83' (pen.)

Pyrgos Stadium, Pyrgos

25 August 2001
13:00 EEST

Ionikos	4–2	Paniliakos
Vílchez 28'; Curbelo 52', 73' (pen.), 77'	Report (page 8)	Giannakidis 21'; Lioftis 90'

Neapoli Stadium, Nikaia
26 August 2001
13:00 EEST

Atromitos	2–3	OFI
Koutloubasis 7'; Gavrilopoulos 70'	Report (page 8)	Iordanidis 61', 88'; Nioplias 75'

Peristeri Stadium, Peristeri

9 September 2001
13:00 EEST

Ionikos	1–2	Atromitos
Vlachos 79'	Report (page 8-9)	Koulis 15'; Gavrilopoulos 58'

Neapoli Stadium, Nikaia
10 September 2001
13:00 EEST

Paniliakos	2–3	OFI
Papadopoulos 26'; Tsigas 75'	Report (page 9)	Wieszczycki 2'; Digozis 47' (pen.); Ipirotis 88'

Pyrgos Stadium, Pyrgos

17 September 2001
13:00 EEST

Atromitos	2–0	Paniliakos
Gavrilopoulos 6'; Karametaxas 28'	Report (page 9)

Peristeri Stadium, Peristeri
17 September 2001
13:00 EEST

OFI	4–0	Ionikos
Digozis 50' (pen.); Gómez 69'; Tzanetis 82'; Kotsios 88'	Report (page 9)

Theodoros Vardinogiannis Stadium, Heraklion

=== Group 4 ===
Pos	Team	Pld	W	D	L	GF	GA	GD	Pts	Qualification	PNC	PNG	CHA	PNT
1	Panachaiki	6	4	0	2	11	5	+6	12	Second Round		1–2	4–2	1–0
2	Panegialios	6	3	2	1	7	6	+1	11	Second Round	0–3		2–2	1–0
3	Chania	6	2	3	1	7	7	0	9		1–0	0–0		0–0
4	Panetolikos	6	0	1	5	1	8	−7	1		0–2	1–2	0–2	

Source: epo.gr
5 August 2001
13:00 EEST

Chania	0–0	Panetolikos
	Report (page 10)

Perivolia Municipal Stadium, Chania
6 August 2001
13:00 EEST

Panegialios	0–3	Panachaiki
	Report (page 10)	Papadopoulos 19'; Epalle 59'; Kobayashi 70'

Aigio National Stadium, Aigio

12 August 2001
13:00 EEST

Panetolikos	0–2	Panachaiki
	Report (page 10)	Vukčević 49'; Kobayashi 86'

Panetolikos Stadium, Agrinio
12 August 2001
13:00 EEST

Chania	0–0	Panegialios
	Report (page 10)

Perivolia Municipal Stadium, Chania

19 August 2001
13:00 EEST

Panachaiki	4–2	Chania
Papadopoulos 54', 80'; Kefalas 61'; Kobayashi 70'	Report (page 11)	Papadomanolakis 28', 49'

Kostas Davourlis Stadium, Patras
19 August 2001
13:00 EEST

Panegialios	1–0	Panetolikos
Valianatos 31'	Report (page 11)

Aigio National Stadium, Aigio

26 August 2001
13:00 EEST

Panetolikos	1–2	Chania
Dodis 74'	Report (page 11)	Markoulakis 19'; Nasis 64' (pen.)

Panetolikos Stadium, Agrinio
26 August 2001
13:00 EEST

Panachaiki	1–2	Panegialios
Papadopoulos 89'	Report (page 11)	Karanikolas 13'; Baiano 67'

Kostas Davourlis Stadium, Patras

9 September 2001
13:00 EEST

Panegialios	2–2	Chania
Nedeljković 23' (pen.); Karanikolas 41'	Report (page 11-12)	Nasis 81'; Manoukos 89'

Aigio National Stadium, Aigio
9 September 2001
13:00 EEST

Panachaiki	1–0	Panetolikos
Kobayashi 25' (pen.)	Report (page 12)

Kostas Davourlis Stadium, Patras

15 September 2001
13:00 EEST

Chania	1–0	Panachaiki
Piperias 88'	Report (page 12)

Perivolia Municipal Stadium, Chania
16 September 2001
13:00 EEST

Panetolikos	0–2	Panegialios
	Report (page 12)	Dimopoulos 5'; Laios 35' (o.g.)

Panetolikos Stadium, Agrinio

=== Group 5 ===
Pos	Team	Pld	W	D	L	GF	GA	GD	Pts	Qualification	KLT	PGSS	LEO	KAS
1	Kallithea	6	4	1	1	14	6	+8	13	Second Round		2–0	3–0	3–1
2	Panionios	6	2	3	1	8	5	+3	9	Second Round	2–1		1–1	4–0
3	Leonidio	6	1	3	2	6	11	−5	6		2–2	0–0		2–1
4	Kassandra	6	1	1	4	8	14	−6	4		1–3	1–1	4–1	

Source: epo.gr
5 August 2001
13:00 EEST

Kassandra	4–1	Leonidio
Tziokas 27', 51'; Kapagiannidis 37'; Zajmi 54'	Report (page 13)	Edu 17'

Municipal Stadium of Kassandreia, Kassandreia
16 August 2001
13:00 EEST

Kallithea	2–0	Panionios
Tsimplidis 77'; Savvidis 89'	Report (page 13)

Grigoris Lamprakis Stadium, Kallithea

12 August 2001
13:00 EEST

Kassandra	1–3	Kallithea
Karatziotis 18'	Report (page 13)	Damianos 6'; Salapasidis 15'; Savvidis 51'

Municipal Stadium of Kassandreia, Kassandreia
19 August 2001
13:00 EEST

Leonidio	0–0	Panionios
	Report (page 13)

Leonidio Municipal Stadium, Leonidio

22 August 2001
13:00 EEST

Kallithea	3–0	Leonidio
Tsimplidis 6', 36'; Savvidis 74'	Report (page 14)

Grigoris Lamprakis Stadium, Kallithea
12 September 2001
13:00 EEST

Panionios	4–0	Kassandra
Giannopoulos 35'; Gonias 48'; Gogolos 55'; Kafalis 69'	Report (page 14)

Nea Smyrni Stadium, Nea Smyrni

26 August 2001
13:00 EEST

Leonidio	2–1	Kassandra
Da Silva 2', 48'	Report (page 14)	Saitiotis 74'

Leonidio Municipal Stadium, Leonidio
16 September 2001
13:00 EEST

Panionios	2–1	Kallithea
Sakellaridis 38'; Mouzaoui 39'	Report (page 14)	Savvidis 59'

Nea Smyrni Stadium, Nea Smyrni

9 September 2001
13:00 EEST

Kallithea	3–1	Kassandra
Gekas 11', 79'; Zelenitsas 78'	Report (page 14-15)	Saitiotis 8'

Grigoris Lamprakis Stadium, Kallithea
10 October 2001
13:00 EEST

Panionios	1–1	Leonidio
Ampelas 87'	Report (page 15)	Moschos 89'

Nea Smyrni Stadium, Nea Smyrni

22 August 2001
13:00 EEST

Kassandra	1–1	Panionios
Karatziotis 59'	Report (page 15)	Giannopoulos 58'

Municipal Stadium of Kassandreia, Kassandreia
22 September 2001
13:00 EEST

Leonidio	2–2	Kallithea
Apostolakis 64'; Da Silva 87'	Report (page 15)	Tsimplidis 17' (pen.), 32'

Leonidio Municipal Stadium, Leonidio

=== Group 6 ===
Pos	Team	Pld	W	D	L	GF	GA	GD	Pts	Qualification	OLY	AGN	AEL	KAL
1	Olympiacos	6	6	0	0	26	5	+21	18	Second Round		1–0	5–3	10–0
2	Agios Nikolaos	6	3	0	3	9	11	−2	9	Second Round	1–6		3–1	2–0
3	AEL	6	2	0	4	10	14	−4	6		0–1	2–1		2–3
4	Kalamata	6	1	0	5	6	21	−15	3		1–3	1–2	1–2	

Source: epo.gr
5 August 2001
13:00 EEST

Agios Nikolaos	3–1	AEL
Mitić 34' (pen.); Angelakis 81'; Daskalakis 89'	Report (page 15-16)	Tachtintis 18'

Agios Nikolaos Municipal Stadium, Agios Nikolaos
15 August 2001
13:00 EEST

Kalamata	1–3	Olympiacos
Athanasiadis 12' (pen.)	Report (page 16)	Zetterberg 3'; Roberts 48'; Álvez 75'

Kalamata Municipal Stadium, Kalamata
Referee: Giorgos Douros (Corinthia)

11 August 2001
13:00 EEST

Agios Nikolaos	2–0	Kalamata
Karvelas 72'; Daskalakis 89' (pen.)	Report (page 16)

Agios Nikolaos Municipal Stadium, Agios Nikolaos
29 August 2001
13:00 EEST

AEL	0–1	Olympiacos
	Report (page 16)	Alexandris 44'

Alcazar Stadium, Larissa
Attendance: 5,705
Referee: Nikos Aggelakis (Thessaloniki)

19 August 2001
13:00 EEST

Kalamata	1–2	AEL
Athanasiadis 61'	Report (page 16)	Mangos 66'; Kontothanasis 70'

Kalamata Municipal Stadium, Kalamata
7 November 2001
13:00 EET

Olympiacos	1–0	Agios Nikolaos
Antzas 25'	Report (page 17)

Olympic Stadium, Marousi
Referee: Kostas Finokaliotis (Athens)

5 September 2001
13:00 EEST

Olympiacos	10–0	Kalamata
Giovanni 6', 16', 42'; Zetterberg 28'; Alexandris 30'; Bermúdez 53'; Karembeu 55'; Patsatzoglou 58', 76'; Álvez 89'	Report (page 17)

Olympic Stadium, Marousi
Attendance: 2,384
Referee: Giorgos Borovilos (Arcadia)
9 September 2001
13:00 EEST

AEL	2–1	Agios Nikolaos
Tachtintis 12'; Mangos 89'	Report (page 17)	Karvelas 79'

Alcazar Stadium, Larissa

16 September 2001
13:00 EEST

Kalamata	1–2	Agios Nikolaos
Goundoulakis 18'	Report (page 17)	Mitić 1'; Spyridakis 35'

Kalamata Municipal Stadium, Kalamata
3 October 2001
13:00 EEST

Olympiacos	5–3	AEL
Alexandris 4', 8'; Niniadis 30', 70' (pen.); Álvez 60'	Report (page 17-18)	P. Giannakopoulos 38'; Tachtintis 65'; Ziagas 87'

Olympic Stadium, Marousi
Attendance: 3,068
Referee: Christoforos Zografos (Athens)

26 August 2001
13:00 EEST

Agios Nikolaos	1–6	Olympiacos
Maris 60'	Report (page 18)	Giannakopoulos 18', 41'; Giovanni 43', 69', 80'; Castillo 54'

Agios Nikolaos Municipal Stadium, Agios Nikolaos
Referee: Manolis Giannadakis (Lasithi)
7 November 2001
13:00 EET

AEL	2–3	Kalamata
Efthymiadis 21', 53'	Report (page 18)	Begetis 25'; Kalantzis 75'; Xarchakos 88'

Alcazar Stadium, Larissa

=== Group 7 ===
Pos	Team	Pld	W	D	L	GF	GA	GD	Pts	Qualification	ARIS	PRO	AKR	TRI
1	Aris	6	5	0	1	13	2	+11	15	Second Round		2–0	2–0	3–0
2	Proodeftiki	6	5	0	1	8	2	+6	15	Second Round	1–0		1–0	4–0
3	Akratitos	6	1	1	4	2	7	−5	4		0–2	0–1		1–0
4	Trikala	6	0	1	5	2	14	−12	1		1–4	0–1	1–1	

Source: epo.gr
5 August 2001
13:00 EEST

Akratitos	1–0	Trikala
Chavos 89'	Report (page 18-19)

Ano Liosia Municipal Stadium, Ano Liosia
5 August 2001
13:00 EEST

Proodeftiki	1–0	Aris
Bayazid 4'	Report (page 19)

Nikaia Municipal Stadium, Nikaia

12 August 2001
13:00 EEST

Akratitos	0–1	Proodeftiki
	Report (page 19)	Bayazid 54'

Ano Liosia Municipal Stadium, Ano Liosia
12 August 2001
13:00 EEST

Trikala	1–4	Aris
Vitevis 33'	Report (page 19)	Charisteas 19'; Ivić 54' (pen.); Kyzeridis 67'; Koutsis 85'

Trikala Municipal Stadium, Trikala

19 August 2001
13:00 EEST

Proodeftiki	4–0	Trikala
Bayazid 40', 73'; Chaniotis 57'; Koumentakos 86'	Report (page 19)

Nikaia Municipal Stadium, Nikaia
19 August 2001
13:00 EET

Aris	2–0	Akratitos
Prilasnig 8'; Chiba 51'	Report (page 19-20)

Aris Stadium, Thessaloniki

26 August 2001
13:00 EEST

Trikala	1–1	Akratitos
Michelidis 66'	Report (page 20)	Velentzas 7'

Trikala Municipal Stadium, Trikala
27 August 2001
13:00 EEST

Aris	2–0	Proodeftiki
Chiba 53'; Charisteas 54'	Report (page 20)

Aris Stadium, Thessaloniki

8 September 2001
13:00 EEST

Proodeftiki	1–0	Akratitos
Pantos 87'	Report (page 20)

Nikaia Municipal Stadium, Nikaia
9 September 2001
13:00 EEST

Aris	3–0	Trikala
Charisteas 45'; Kyzeridis 47'; Christodoulou 89'	Report (page 20)

Aris Stadium, Thessaloniki

16 September 2001
13:00 EEST

Trikala	0–1	Proodeftiki
	Report (page 21)	Chaniotis 11'

Trikala Municipal Stadium, Trikala
16 September 2001
13:00 EET

Akratitos	0–2	Aris
	Report (page 21)	Liolidis 30', 32'

Ano Liosia Municipal Stadium, Ano Liosia

=== Group 8 ===
Pos	Team	Pld	W	D	L	GF	GA	GD	Pts	Qualification	PAOK	CHA	PNE	OLV
1	PAOK	6	5	1	0	16	6	+10	16	Second Round		4–1	2–2	5–2
2	Chalkidona	6	3	1	2	9	7	+2	10	Second Round	0–1		3–0	3–1
3	Panelefsiniakos	6	1	3	2	5	9	−4	6		0–2	1–1		1–0
4	Olympiacos Volos	6	0	1	5	5	13	−8	1		1–2	0–1	1–1	

Source: epo.gr
4 August 2001
13:00 EEST

Olympiacos Volos	1–2	PAOK
Manda 81'	Report (page 21)	Okkas 34'; Kafes 44'

Volos Municipal Stadium, Volos
8 August 2001
13:00 EEST

Chalkidona	3–0	Panelefsiniakos
Moustakas 26', 39'; Tioutios 28'	Report (page 21-22)

Pantelis Nikolaidis Stadium, Nikaia

12 August 2001
13:00 EEST

Chalkidona	3–1	Olympiacos Volos
Dimadamas 47'; Karapitsos 66'; Zacharopoulos 73'	Report (page 22)	Manda 58'

Pantelis Nikolaidis Stadium, Nikaia
13 August 2001
13:00 EEST

Panelefsiniakos	0–2	PAOK
	Report (page 22)	Spasić 7'; Luciano 65'

Municipal Stadium of Eleusina, Elefsina

19 August 2001
13:00 EEST

Olympiacos Volos	1–1	Panelefsiniakos
Vlachoudis 25'	Report (page 22)	Medan 89'

Volos Municipal Stadium, Volos
20 August 2001
13:00 EEST

PAOK	4–1	Chalkidona
Kafes 14'; Georgiadis 37'; Okkas 59'; Luciano 65'	Report (page 22)	Athanasiadis 55'

Toumba Stadium, Thessaloniki

26 August 2001
13:00 EEST

PAOK	5–2	Olympiacos Volos
Yiasoumi 5', 78'; Engomitis 35'; Spasić 68'; Nastos 84'	Report (page 23)	Manda 22'; Pappas 22'

Toumba Stadium, Thessaloniki
26 August 2001
13:00 EEST

Panelefsiniakos	1–1	Chalkidona
Klisaris 89'	Report (page 23)	Koffas 53'

Municipal Stadium of Eleusina, Elefsina

9 September 2001
13:00 EEST

Olympiacos Volos	0–1	Chalkidona
	Report (page 23)	Zacharopoulos 44'

Volos Municipal Stadium, Volos
10 October 2001
13:00 EEST

PAOK	2–2	Panelefsiniakos
Frousos 14'; Nastos 21'	Report (page 23)	Neofotistos 44'; Alexis 54'

Municipal Stadium of Epanomi, Thessaloniki

7 November 2001
13:00 EET

Panelefsiniakos	1–0	Olympiacos Volos
Tsiakas 30'	Report (page 23-24)

Municipal Stadium of Eleusina, Elefsina
8 November 2001
13:00 EET

Chalkidona	0–1	PAOK
	Report (page 24)	Koulakiotis 89'

Pantelis Nikolaidis Stadium, Nikaia

=== Group 9 ===
Pos	Team	Pld	W	D	L	GF	GA	GD	Pts	Qualification	IRA	FOS	PAS	ETP
1	Iraklis	6	5	0	1	16	7	+9	15	Second Round		3–2	3–1	3–1
2	Fostiras	6	3	1	2	8	8	0	10	Second Round	2–0		0–0	2–1
3	PAS Giannina	6	1	3	2	6	7	−1	6		0–2	3–0		1–1
4	Ethnikos Piraeus	6	0	2	4	6	14	−8	2		1–5	1–2	1–1	

Source: epo.gr
4 August 2001
13:00 EEST

PAS Giannina	0–2	Iraklis
	Report (page 24)	Fofonka 20', 61'

Zosimades Stadium, Ioannina
5 August 2001
13:00 EEST

Fostiras	2–1	Ethnikos Piraeus
Moutas 37' (pen.); Skopelitis 49'	Report (page 24)	Loukopoulos 53'

Tavros Stadium, Tavros

11 August 2001
13:00 EEST

Ethnikos Piraeus	1–5	Iraklis
Kakoglou 81' (pen.)	Report (page 25)	Hagan 35'; Zarras 43' (o.g.); Nasiopoulos 58'; Sapountzis 83' (pen.); Gojković 86'

Grigoris Lamprakis Stadium, Kallithea
12 August 2001
13:00 EEST

Fostiras	0–0	PAS Giannina
	Report (page 25)

Tavros Stadium, Tavros

19 August 2001
13:00 EEST

PAS Giannina	1–1	Ethnikos Piraeus
Barcelo 67'	Report (page 25)	Loukopoulos 88'

Zosimades Stadium, Ioannina
22 August 2001
13:00 EEST

Iraklis	3–2	Fostiras
Kormaris 26', 65'; Alexopoulos 34'	Report (page 25)	Papachristos 42'; Skopelitis 52'

Kaftanzoglio Stadium, Thessaloniki

25 August 2001
13:00 EEST

Iraklis	3–1	PAS Giannina
Fofonka 10', 89'; Nasiopoulos 19'	Report (page 25-26)	Gittas 83' (pen.)

Kaftanzoglio Stadium, Thessaloniki
26 August 2001
13:00 EEST

Ethnikos Piraeus	1–2	Fostiras
Kakoglou 23'	Report (page 26)	Karamanos 13'; Rosales 89' (pen.)

Grigoris Lamprakis Stadium, Kallithea

9 September 2001
13:00 EEST

PAS Giannina	3–0	Fostiras
Ramírez 2'; Kakos 57', 67'	Report (page 26)

Zosimades Stadium, Ioannina
9 September 2001
13:00 EEST

Iraklis	3–1	Ethnikos Piraeus
Kormaris 14', 27'; Sapountzis 82' (pen.)	Report (page 26)	Loukopoulos 62'

Kaftanzoglio Stadium, Thessaloniki

16 September 2001
13:00 EEST

Ethnikos Piraeus	1–0	PAS Giannina
Komiotis 78'	Report (page 26)	Bourbos 58'

Grigoris Lamprakis Stadium, Kallithea
16 September 2001
13:00 EEST

Fostiras	2–0	Iraklis
Moutas 36' (pen.); Kozanidis 37'	Report (page 27)

Tavros Stadium, Tavros

=== Group 10 ===
Pos	Team	Pld	W	D	L	GF	GA	GD	Pts	Qualification	PAO	APK	PTR	MAR
1	Panathinaikos	6	3	3	0	11	4	+7	12	Second Round		1–0	0–0	6–2
2	Apollon Kalamarias	6	3	2	1	13	6	+7	11	Second Round	1–1		4–1	3–0
3	Patraikos	6	1	4	1	7	9	−2	7		0–0	3–3		1–1
4	Marko	6	0	1	5	5	17	−12	1		1–3	0–2	1–2	

Source: epo.gr

4 August 2001
13:00 EET

Patraikos	1–1	Marko
Dragaš 67'	Report (page 27)	Tsirtsikos 85'

Prosfygika Stadium, Patras
30 August 2001
13:00 EEST

Apollon Kalamarias	1–1	Panathinaikos
Demirtzoglou 82'	Report (page 27)	Warzycha 22'

Kalamaria Stadium, Thessaloniki

12 August 2001
13:00 EEST

Marko	1–3	Panathinaikos
Lazorík 43' (pen.)	Report (page 27-28)	Vlaović 20', 69'; Olisadebe 58'

Municipal Stadium of Markopoulo, Markopoulo
12 August 2001
13:00 EET

Patraikos	3–3	Apollon Kalamarias
Katerinis 37'; Lazanas 74'; Kalykas 89'	Report (page 28)	Kartalis 9'; Nolis 67'; Bwelle 88'

Prosfygika Stadium, Patras

18 August 2001
13:00 EEST

Panathinaikos	0–0	Patraikos
	Report (page 28)

Leoforos Alexandras Stadium, Ampelokipoi
19 August 2001
13:00 EEST

Apollon Kalamarias	3–0	Marko
Demirtzoglou 44'; Troupkos 51' (pen.), 83'	Report (page 28)

Kalamaria Stadium, Thessaloniki

26 August 2001
13:00 EEST

Marko	1–2	Patraikos
Lazorík 52'	Report (page 28)	Dragaš 36'; Boudouris 55'

Municipal Stadium of Markopoulo, Markopoulo
27 August 2001
13:00 EEST

Panathinaikos	1–0	Apollon Kalamarias
Kolkka 65'	Report (page 28-29)

Leoforos Alexandras Stadium, Ampelokipoi

9 September 2001
13:00 EEST

Apollon Kalamarias	4–1	Patraikos
Kartalis 7'; Bwelle 29'; Argyropoulos 50' (o.g.); Moungue 64'	Report (page 29)	Boudouris 87'

Kalamaria Stadium, Thessaloniki
10 October 2001
13:00 EEST

Panathinaikos	6–2	Marko
Basinas 30' (pen.); Vlaović 33'; Warzycha 36', 54'; Boateng 51'; Fyssas 63'	Report (page 29)	Vokolos 24' (o.g.); Tosounidis 32' (pen.)

Leoforos Alexandras Stadium, Ampelokipoi

16 September 2001
13:00 EEST

Marko	0–2	Apollon Kalamarias
	Report (page 29)	Moungue 53'; Nolis 55'

Municipal Stadium of Markopoulo, Markopoulo
7 November 2001
13:00 EET

Patraikos	0–0	Panathinaikos
	Report (page 30)

Prosfygika Stadium, Patras

=== Group 11 ===
Pos	Team	Pld	W	D	L	GF	GA	GD	Pts	Qualification	XAN	KIL	ATH	AKV
1	Skoda Xanthi	6	5	1	0	15	2	+13	16	Second Round		3–1	1–0	6–1
2	Kilkisiakos	6	3	1	2	7	5	+2	10	Second Round	0–0		1–2	1–0
3	Athinaikos	6	3	0	3	6	8	−2	9		0–4	0–1		3–1
4	Apollon Krya Vrysi	6	0	0	6	2	15	−13	0		0–1	0–3	0–1	

Source: epo.gr

5 August 2001
13:00 EET

Apollon Krya Vrysi	0–3	Kilkisiakos
	Report (page 30)	Pavlidis 31' (pen.); Platakis 65'; Stefanidis 89'

Ioannis Tserkezidis Stadium, Krya Vrysi
8 August 2001
13:00 EEST

Athinaikos	0–4	Skoda Xanthi
	Report (page 30)	Leitner 17', 86'; Terrão 82'; Ouakili 89' (pen.)

Vyronas National Stadium, Vyronas

12 August 2001
13:00 EEST

Kilkisiakos	0–0	Skoda Xanthi
	Report (page 30-31)

Kilkis Municipal Stadium, Kilkis
12 August 2001
13:00 EET

Apollon Krya Vrysi	0–1	Athinaikos
	Report (page 31)	Buyse 80'

Ioannis Tserkezidis Stadium, Krya Vrysi

19 August 2001
13:00 EEST

Skoda Xanthi	6–1	Apollon Krya Vrysi
Terrão 16', 35'; Papadimitriou 34'; Zouboulis 44', 58'; Labriakos 80'	Report (page 31)	Paschalidis 84'

A.O. Xanthi Stadium, Xanthi
19 August 2001
13:00 EEST

Athinaikos	0–1	Kilkisiakos
	Report (page 31)	Platakis 10'

Vyronas National Stadium, Vyronas

26 August 2001
13:00 EEST

Kilkisiakos	1–0	Apollon Krya Vrysi
Platakis 50'	Report (page 31-32)

Kilkis Municipal Stadium, Kilkis
26 August 2001
13:00 EEST

Skoda Xanthi	1–0	Athinaikos
Prittas 59'	Report (page 32)

A.O. Xanthi Stadium, Xanthi

9 September 2001
13:00 EEST

Athinaikos	3–1	Apollon Krya Vrysi
Buyse 35', 70' (pen.); Providas 86'	Report (page 32)	Antoniadis 44'

Vyronas National Stadium, Vyronas
9 September 2001
13:00 EEST

Skoda Xanthi	3–1	Kilkisiakos
Kaounos 2'; Labriakos 27'; Kechagias 60'	Report (page 32)	Platakis 89'

A.O. Xanthi Stadium, Xanthi

16 September 2001
13:00 EEST

Apollon Krya Vrysi	0–1	Skoda Xanthi
	Report (page 32)	Kordonouris 17'

Ioannis Tserkezidis Stadium, Krya Vrysi
16 September 2001
13:00 EEST

Kilkisiakos	1–2	Athinaikos
Pavlidis 44'	Report (page 32)	Dissa 58'; Psarris 81'

Kilkis Municipal Stadium, Kilkis

== Knockout phase ==
Each tie in the knockout phase, apart from the final, was played over two legs, with each team playing one leg at home. The team that scored more goals on aggregate over the two legs advanced to the next round. If the aggregate score was level, the away goals rule was applied, i.e. the team that scored more goals away from home over the two legs advanced. If away goals were also equal, then extra time was played. The away goals rule was again applied after extra time, i.e. if there were goals scored during extra time and the aggregate score was still level, the visiting team advanced by virtue of more away goals scored. If no goals were scored during extra time, the winners were decided by a penalty shoot-out. In the final, which were played as a single match, if the score was level at the end of normal time, extra time was played, followed by a penalty shoot-out if the score was still level.
The mechanism of the draws for each round is as follows:

- There are no seedings, and teams from the same group can be drawn against each other.

== Bracket ==
Second round
Ionikos	3	1	4
Fostiras	1	1	2
Skoda Xanthi (bye)
Aris (bye)
Panachaiki (bye)
Panegialios	1	0	1
Kilkisiakos	1	1	2
AEK Athens	3	1	4
Agios Nikolaos	0	0	0
Apollon Kalamarias	1	0	1
Chalkidona	1	2	3
PAOK (bye)
Olympiacos (bye)
Egaleo	0	3	3
Panionios	1	1	2
Kallithea (bye)
OFI (bye)
Ethnikos Asteras (bye)
Proodeftiki	1	1	2
Kerkyra	0	1	1
Iraklis (bye)
Panathinaikos (bye)

Round of 16
Ionikos	0	0	0
Skoda Xanthi	0	1	1
Aris (a.e.t.)	0	2	2
Panachaiki	0	1	1
Kilkisiakos	0	0	0
AEK Athens	1	6	7
Chalkidona	0	0	0
PAOK	3	1	4
Olympiacos	5	3	8
Egaleo	1	0	1
Kallithea	2	1	3
OFI	1	0	1
Ethnikos Asteras	4	0	4
Proodeftiki	0	2	2
Iraklis (a)	1	1	2
Panathinaikos	0	2	2

Quarter-finals
Skoda Xanthi (a)	0	2	2
Aris	1	1	2
AEK Athens	2	4	6
PAOK	1	0	1
Olympiacos	3	4	7
Kallithea	0	0	0
Ethnikos Asteras	1	0	1
Iraklis	1	3	4

Semi-finals
Skoda Xanthi	0	0	0
AEK Athens (a.e.t.)	0	1	1
Olympiacos	3	3	6
Iraklis	2	0	2

Final
AEK Athens	2
Olympiacos	1

== Second round ==
=== Summary ===
Team 1	Agg.	Team 2	1st leg	2nd leg
AEK Athens	4–0	Agios Nikolaos	3–0	1–0
Ionikos	4–2	Fostiras	3–1	1–1
Proodeftiki	2–1	Kerkyra	1–0	1–1
Egaleo	3–2	Panionios	0–1	3–1
Apollon Kalamarias	1–3	Chalkidona	1–1	0–2
Panegialios	1–2	Kilkisiakos	1–1	0–1
Iraklis	bye			
Panathinaikos	bye			
Aris	bye			
Panachaiki	bye			
Kallithea	bye			
OFI	bye			
Olympiacos	bye			
PAOK	bye			
Skoda Xanthi	bye			
Ethnikos Asteras	bye			

=== Matches ===
28 November 2001
19:00 EET

AEK Athens	3–0	Agios Nikolaos
Ferrugem 26'; Trichias 80'; Konstantinidis 87'	Report (page 33)

Nikos Goumas Stadium, Nea Filadelfeia
Attendance: 124
Referee: Spyros Voulgaris (Piraeus)
19 December 2001
14:45 EET

Agios Nikolaos	0–1	AEK Athens
	Report (page 34)	Trichias 77'

Agios Nikolaos Municipal Stadium, Agios Nikolaos
Referee: Giorgos Tsangarakis (Chania)

AEK Athens won 4–0 on aggregate.

29 November 2001
17:00 EET

Ionikos	3–1	Fostiras
Curbelo 7'; Dagounakis 63'; Peixe 85'	Report (page 33)	Armylagos 89'

Neapoli Stadium, Nikaia
13 December 2001
14:15 EET

Fostiras	1–1	Ionikos
Tsangaris 53'	Report (page 34-35)	Gutman 88' (pen.)

Tavros Stadium, Tavros

Ionikos won on 4–2 on aggregate

28 November 2001
17:00 EET

Proodeftiki	1–0	Kerkyra
Bayazid 58'	Report (page 33-34)

Nikaia Municipal Stadium, Nikaia
12 December 2001
14:15 EET

Kerkyra	1–1	Proodeftiki
Tsoukalidis 42' (pen.)	Report (page 35)	Pantos 85'

Kerkyra Stadium, Corfu

Proodeftiki won 2–1 on aggregate

29 November 2001
19:00 EET

Egaleo	0–1	Panionios
	Report (page 34)	Mouzaoui 3'

Stavros Mavrothalassitis Stadium, Aigaleo
13 December 2001
16:00 EET

Panionios	1–3	Egaleo
Giannopoulos 53'	Report (page 35)	Agritis 17', 82'; Nikolopoulos 88'

Nea Smyrni Stadium, Nea Smyrni

Egaleo won 3–2 on aggregate

28 November 2001
15:30 EET

Apollon Kalamarias	1–1	Chalkidona
Chantouris 44'	Report (page 35)	Georgakas 7'

Kalamaria Stadium, Thessaloniki
12 December 2001
15:30 EET

Chalkidona	2–0	Apollon Kalamarias
Katsaros 49'; Kriaras 51'	Report (page 35)

Pantelis Nikolaidis Stadium, Nikaia

Chalkidona won 3–1 on aggregate

28 November 2001
14:45 EET

Panegialios	1–1	Kilkisiakos
Lakrintis 88'	Report (page 34)	Angelis 90'

Aigio National Stadium, Aigio
12 December 2001
14:15 EET

Kilkisiakos	1–0	Panegialios
Sidiropoulos 75'	Report (page 35)

Kilkis Municipal Stadium, Kilkis

Kilkisiakos won 2–1 on aggregate

== Round of 16 ==
=== Summary ===
Team 1	Agg.	Team 2	1st leg	2nd leg
Olympiacos	8–1	Egaleo	5–1	3–0
Iraklis	(a) 2–2	Panathinaikos	1–0	1–2
Aris	2–1	Panachaiki	0–0	2–1 (a.e.t.)
Ethnikos Asteras	4–2	Proodeftiki	4–0	0–2
Ionikos	0–1	Skoda Xanthi	0–0	0–1
Kallithea	3–1	OFI	2–1	1–0
Chalkidona	0–4	PAOK	0–3	0–1
Kilkisiakos	0–7	AEK Athens	0–1	0–6

=== Matches ===
19 December 2001
16:00 EET

Olympiacos	5–1	Egaleo
Alexandris 44', 49', 74'; Đorđević 76'; Patsatzoglou 88'	Report (page 36)	Meidanis 38'

Olympic Stadium, Marousi
Attendance: 1,050
Referee: Spyros Papadakos (Laconia)
16 January 2002
18:30 EET

Egaleo	0–3	Olympiacos
	Report (page 37)	Giannakopoulos 17'; Álvez 44', 63'

Grigoris Lamprakis Stadium, Kallithea
Attendance: 132
Referee: Lambros Gouvas (Arta)

Olympiacos won 8–1 on aggregate

16 January 2002
16:30 EET

Iraklis	1–0	Panathinaikos
Nikopolidis 37' (o.g.)	Report (page 36)

Kaftanzoglio Stadium, Thessaloniki
23 January 2002
18:00 EET

Panathinaikos	2–1	Iraklis
Kyriazis 40' (o.g.); Lyberopoulos 43'	Report (page 37-38)	Kebadze 82'

Leoforos Alexandras Stadium, Ampelokipoi

Iraklis won on away goals.

9 January 2002
17:15 EET

Aris	0–0	Panachaiki
	Report (page 36)

Aris Stadium, Thessaloniki
16 January 2002
17:15 EET

Panachaiki	1–2 (a.e.t.)	Aris
Gitsis 97'	Report (page 38)	N. Papadopoulos 115' (pen.); Kazantzis 119'

Kostas Davourlis Stadium, Patras

Aris won 2–1 on aggregate

21 December 2001
15:00 EET

Ethnikos Asteras	4–0	Proodeftiki
Nikiforos 10'; Tsalikis 23'; Tešović 28'; Theocharopoulos 89'	Report (page 36)

Michalis Kritikopoulos Stadium, Kaisariani
17 January 2002
14:30 EET

Proodeftiki	2–0	Ethnikos Asteras
Andralas 8'; Spertos 74'	Report (page 38)

Nikaia Municipal Stadium, Nikaia

Ethnikos Asteras won 4–2 on aggregate

20 December 2001
16:30 EET

Ionikos	0–0	Skoda Xanthi
	Report (page 36-37)

Neapoli Stadium, Nikaia
16 January 2002
14:00 EET

Skoda Xanthi	1–0	Ionikos
Sfakianakis 31'	Report (page 38)

A.O. Xanthi Stadium, Xanthi

Skoda Xanthi won 1–0 on aggregate

20 December 2001
14:45 EET

Kallithea	2–1	OFI
Koça 88'; Gekas 89'	Report (page 37)	Adamos 24'

Grigoris Lamprakis Stadium, Kallithea
17 January 2002
16:30 EET

OFI	0–1	Kallithea
	Report (page 38)	Tsimplidis 68' (pen.)

Theodoros Vardinogiannis Stadium, Heraklion

Kallithea won 3–1 on aggregate

19 December 2001
14:15 EET

Chalkidona	0–3	PAOK
	Report (page 37)	Georgiadis 18'; Frousos 28'; Konstantinidis 69'

Pantelis Nikolaidis Stadium, Nikaia
15 January 2002
16:00 EET

PAOK	1–0	Chalkidona
Kafes 28'	Report (page 38-39)

Toumba Stadium, Thessaloniki

PAOK won 4–0 on aggregate

9 January 2002
15:00 EET

Kilkisiakos	0–1	AEK Athens
	Report (page 37)	Maladenis 87'

Kilkis Municipal Stadium, Kilkis
Referee: Giannis Bisogiannis (Thessaloniki)
17 January 2002
19:00 EET

AEK Athens	6–0	Kilkisiakos
Folha 12'; Maladenis 45'; Lakis 52', 60'; Ferrugem 56'; Ivić 90' (pen.)	Report (page 39)

Nikos Goumas Stadium, Nea Filadelfeia
Referee: Vasilis Terovitsas (Aetoloacarnania)

AEK Athens won 7–0 on aggregate

== Quarter-finals ==
=== Summary ===
Team 1	Agg.	Team 2	1st leg	2nd leg
Olympiacos	7–0	Kallithea	3–0	4–0
AEK Athens	6–1	PAOK	2–1	4–0
Skoda Xanthi	(a) 2–2	Aris	0–1	2–1
Ethnikos Asteras	1–4	Iraklis	1–1	0–3

=== Matches ===
31 January 2002
17:15 EET

Olympiacos	3–0	Kallithea
Antzas 72'; Giovanni 78', 86'	Report (page 39)

Olympic Stadium, Marousi
Attendance: 1,687
Referee: Kyros Vassaras (Thessaloniki)
7 February 2002
14:30 EET

Kallithea	0–4	Olympiacos
	Report (page 40)	Alexandris 27'; Bermúdez 35'; Álvez 49'; Giovanni 80'

Grigoris Lamprakis Stadium, Kallithea
Attendance: 1,730
Referee: Nikos Angelakis (Thessaloniki)

Olympiacos won 7–0 on aggregate.

30 January 2002
19:00 EET

AEK Athens	2–1	PAOK
Tsiartas 36'; Maladenis 61'	Report (page 39)	Frousos 49'

Nikos Goumas Stadium, Nea Filadelfeia
Attendance: 6,310
Referee: Spyros Papadakos (Laconia)
6 February 2002
19:00 EET

PAOK	0–4	AEK Athens
	Report (page 40)	Tsiartas 28' (pen.); Lakis 39'; Nikolaidis 48'; Ivić 89'

Toumba Stadium, Thessaloniki
Attendance: 15,109
Referee: Giorgos Tsangarakis (Chania)

AEK Athens won 5–1 on aggregate.

30 January 2002
17:00 EET

Skoda Xanthi	0–1	Aris
	Report (page 39)	Liolidis 62'

A.O. Xanthi Stadium, Xanthi
6 February 2002

Aris	1–2	Skoda Xanthi
Papadopoulos 66'	Report (page 40)	Zapropoulos 62'; Ba 72'

Aris Stadium, Thessaloniki

Skoda Xanthi won away goals.

31 January 2002
17:00 EET

Ethnikos Asteras	1–1	Iraklis
Papadimitriou 78' (pen.)	Report (page 39)	Nasiopoulos 85'

Michalis Kritikopoulos Stadium, Kaisariani
7 February 2002
17:00 EET

Iraklis	3–0	Ethnikos Asteras
Kormaris 36'; Kebadze 71'; Fofonka 89'	Report (page 40)

Kaftanzoglio Stadium, Thessaloniki

Iraklis won 4–1 on aggregate.

== Semi-finals ==
=== Summary ===
Team 1	Agg.	Team 2	1st leg	2nd leg
Olympiacos	6–2	Iraklis	3–2	3–0
Skoda Xanthi	0–1	AEK Athens	0–0	0–1 (a.e.t.)

=== Matches ===
13 March 2002
18:30 EET

Olympiacos	3–2	Iraklis
Koutsoures 60' (o.g.); Alexandris 66', 81'	Report (page 41)	Fofonka 30'; Kebadze 42'

Olympic Stadium, Marousi
Attendance: 8,930
Referee: Spyros Papadakos (Laconia)
10 April 2002
18:30 EEST

Iraklis	0–3	Olympiacos
	Report (page 41)	Đorđević 24', 75'; Alexandris 44'

Kaftanzoglio Stadium, Thessaloniki
Attendance: 11,250
Referee: Thanasis Briakos (Epirus)

Olympiacos won 6–2 on aggregate.

13 March 2002
16:30 EET

Skoda Xanthi	0–0	AEK Athens
	Report (page 41)

A.O. Xanthi Stadium, Xanthi
Referee: Iraklis Tsikinis (Messinia)
10 April 2002
16:00 EEST

AEK Athens	1–0 (a.e.t.)	Skoda Xanthi
Ivić 106'	Report (page 41)

Nikos Goumas Stadium, Nea Filadelfeia
Referee: Pavlos Papilias (Piraeus)

AEK Athens won 1–0 on aggregate.

== Final ==
27 April 2002
21:00 EEST

AEK Athens	2–1	Olympiacos
Konstantinidis 52'; Ivić 82'	Report	Giovanni 70'

Olympic Stadium, Marousi
Attendance: 45,258
Referee: Thanasis Briakos (Epirus)

== Top scorers ==
Rank	Player	Club	Goals
1	(Greece) Alexis Alexandris	Olympiacos	11
2	(Brazil) Giovanni	Olympiacos	10
3	(Greece) Nikolaos Tsimplidis	Kallithea	6
3	(Uruguay) Gabriel Álvez	Olympiacos	6
3	(Greece) Theodoros Papadimitriou	Ethnikos Asteras	6
3	(Brazil) Ederson Fofonka	Iraklis	6
3	(Greece) Christos Maladenis	AEK Athens	6
3	(Greece) Vasilios Tsiartas	AEK Athens	6
3	(Greece) Demis Nikolaidis	AEK Athens	6
8	(Greece) Konstantinos Kormaris	Iraklis	5
8	(Syria) Said Bayazid	Proodeftiki	5
8	(Uruguay) Luis Curbelo	Ionikos	5
