= 2001–02 Olympiacos F.C. season =

Olympiacos
2001–02 season
- Chairman: Sokratis Kokkalis
- Manager: Takis Lemonis
- Stadium: Athens Olympic Stadium
- Alpha Ethniki: 1st (champions)
- Greek Cup: Runner-up
- Champions League: Group stage
- Top goalscorer: League: Alexis Alexandris (19); All: Alexis Alexandris (32)
Home colours	Away colours	Third colours

The 2001–02 season was Olympiacos's 43rd consecutive season in the Alpha Ethniki and their 76th year in existence. The club were played their 5th consecutive season in the UEFA Champions League. In the beginning of the summertime Olympiacos named Greek Takis Lemonis coach.

== Players ==
=== First-team squad ===
Squad at end of season

Note: Flags indicate national team as defined under FIFA eligibility rules; some limited exceptions apply. Players may hold more than one non-FIFA nationality.

No.	Pos.	Nation	Player
2	DF	GRE	Christos Patsatzoglou
3	DF	GRE	Stelios Venetidis
4	DF	COL	Jorge Bermúdez
5	DF	GRE	Georgios Amanatidis
6	MF	GRE	Ilias Poursanidis
7	MF	GRE	Stelios Giannakopoulos
8	MF	FRA	Christian Karembeu
9	FW	GRE	Lambros Choutos
10	FW	BRA	Giovanni
11	MF	YUG	Predrag Đorđević
13	MF	BRA	Zé Elias
14	DF	GRE	Dimitrios Mavrogenidis
15	GK	GRE	Angelos Georgiou
16	FW	MEX	Nery Castillo
17	FW	GHA	Peter Ofori-Quaye

No.	Pos.	Nation	Player
18	DF	GRE	Paraskevas Antzas
19	DF	GRE	Athanasios Kostoulas
20	MF	SWE	Pär Zetterberg
21	MF	GRE	Andreas Niniadis
22	GK	GRE	Fanis Katergiannakis
23	DF	GRE	Christos Kontis
24	FW	LBR	Zizi Roberts
29	GK	GRE	Konstantinos Dougeroglou
30	FW	GRE	Alexis Alexandris
31	GK	GRE	Dimitrios Eleftheropoulos
32	DF	GRE	Georgios Anatolakis
34	GK	GRE	Kleopas Giannou
44	GK	GRE	Michalis Sifakis
99	FW	URU	Gabriel Álvez

== Competitions ==
=== Alpha Ethniki ===
==== League table ====
Pos	Team	Pld	W	D	L	GF	GA	GD	Pts	Qualification or relegation
1	Olympiacos (C)	26	17	7	2	69	30	+39	58 (Note: Head-to-head record: AEK Athens–Olympiacos 2–3, Olympiacos–AEK Athens 4–3.)	Qualification for Champions League first group stage
2	AEK Athens	26	19	1	6	65	28	+37	58	Qualification for Champions League third qualifying round
3	Panathinaikos	26	16	7	3	53	25	+28	55	Qualification for UEFA Cup first round
4	PAOK	26	14	6	6	55	45	+10	48	Qualification for UEFA Cup first round
5	Skoda Xanthi	26	12	6	8	34	26	+8	42	Qualification for UEFA Cup first round

Source: Galanis Sports Data
Rules for classification: 1st points; 2nd head-to-head points; 3rd head-to-head goal difference; 4th decision match.
(C) Champions

==== Results summary ====
Overall								Home						Away					
Pld	W	D	L	GF	GA	GD	Pts	W	D	L	GF	GA	GD	W	D	L	GF	GA	GD
26	17	7	2	69	30	+39	58	9	3	1	38	11	+27	8	4	1	31	19	+12

Last updated: 8 May 2002.
Source: Competitive matches

==== Results by round ====
Round	1	2	3	4	5	6	7	8	9	10	11	12	13	14	15	16	17	18	19	20	21	22	23	24	25	26
Ground	H	H	A	H	A	H	A	H	A	A	H	A	H	A	A	H	A	H	A	H	A	H	H	A	H	A
Result	W	W	D	W	W	D	W	D	D	W	W	W	L	D	L	W	W	W	W	W	D	W	D	W	W	W
Position	1	2	2	1	1	2	2	2	2	2	2	1	1	2	4	3	2	1	1	1	2	2	2	2	1	1

Source: Competitive matches
A = Away; H = Home; W = Win; D = Draw; L = Loss

==== Matches ====
All times at EET

22 September 2001 1	Olympiacos	3–0	Iraklis	Marousi
18:00	Niniadis 44', 45' (pen.); Giannakopoulos 54'			Stadium: Olympic Stadium; Attendance: 13,929; Referee: Christos Trikalis

30 September 2001 2	Olympiacos	2–0	Panionios	Marousi
17:00	Roberts 17', 58'			Stadium: Olympic Stadium; Attendance: 11,421; Referee: Athanassios Briakos

14 October 2001 3	PAOK	1–1	Olympiacos	Thessaloniki
19:00	Spasić 64'		Giannakopoulos 55'	Stadium: Toumba Stadium; Attendance: 22,000; Referee: Athanassios Briakos

20 October 2001 4	Olympiacos	5–0	Ionikos	Marousi
18:00	Alexandris 19'; Đorđević 54' (pen.); Poursanidis 71'; Álvez 79'; Roberts 88'			Stadium: Olympic Stadium; Attendance: 8,816; Referee: Christoforos Zografos

4 November 2001 5	Egaleo	3–4	Olympiacos	Aigaleo
19:00	Nikolopoulos 14'; Chloros 42'; Makris 78'		Roberts 12', 47'; Alexandris 74'; Giannakopoulos 81' (pen.)	Stadium: Stavros Mavrothalassitis Stadium; Attendance: 334; Referee: Christos Trikalis

18 November 2001 6	Olympiacos	1–1	Skoda Xanthi	Marousi
19:00	Antzas 47'		Ouakili 25'	Stadium: Olympic Stadium; Attendance: 6,244; Referee: Georgios Kasnaferis

24 November 2001 7	Ethnikos Asteras	2–4	Olympiacos	Kaisariani
19:00	Podaras 20'; Kontopoulos 89'		Alexandris 10'; Giovanni 27'; Edusei 51' (o.g.); Giannakopoulos 90'	Stadium: Michalis Kritikopoulos Stadium; Attendance: 3,120; Referee: Spyros Voulgaris

1 December 2001 8	Olympiacos	2–2	Panathinaikos	Marousi
19:00	Alexandris 25'; Đorđević 42'		Olisadebe 72', 77'	Stadium: Olympic Stadium; Attendance: 40,982; Referee: Nikos Aggelakis

8 December 2001 9	OFI	1–1	Olympiacos	Heraklion
19:00	Gómez 55'		Alexandris 30'	Stadium: Theodoros Vardinogiannis Stadium; Attendance: 5,806; Referee: Georgios Kasnaferis

15 December 2001 10	Akratitos	2–3	Olympiacos	Ano Liosia
19:00	Ziakas 12'; Koutsokostas 22'		Bermúdez 4'; Alexandris 23'; Đorđević 84'	Stadium: Giannis Pathiakakis Stadium; Attendance: 2,300; Referee: Georgios Tsagarakis

13 January 2002 11	Olympiacos	4–0	Panachaiki	Marousi
19:00	Alexandris 20', 73', 79'; Giannakopoulos 85'			Stadium: Olympic Stadium; Attendance: 10,000; Referee: Nikos Aggelakis

20 January 2002 12	AEK Athens	2–3	Olympiacos	Nea Filadelfeia
19:00	Nikolaidis 8'; Tsiartas 43'		Alexandris 22'; Giovanni 77'; Đorđević 88'	Stadium: Nikos Goumas Stadium; Attendance: 18,151; Referee: Makis Efthimiadis

27 January 2002 13	Olympiacos	0–1	Aris	Marousi
19:00			Jbari 79'	Stadium: Olympic Stadium; Attendance: 19,069; Referee: Christos Trikalis

3 February 2002 14	Iraklis	1–1	Olympiacos	Thessaloniki
17:00	Fofonka 60'		Đorđević 56'	Stadium: Kaftanzoglio Stadium; Attendance: 17,423; Referee: Georgios Tsagarakis

10 February 2002 15	Panionios	3–1	Olympiacos	Nea Smyrni
17:00	Šiljak 25'; Vlček 31', 42'		Alexandris 3'	Stadium: Nea Smyrni Stadium; Attendance: 8,591; Referee: Nikos Aggelakis

17 February 2002 16	Olympiacos	3–2	PAOK	Marousi
20:00	Giovanni 9'; Giannakopoulos 14'; Đorđević 17'		Georgiadis 54', 58' (pen.)	Stadium: Olympic Stadium; Attendance: 37,825; Referee: Georgios Kasnaferis

24 February 2002 17	Ionikos	0–2	Olympiacos	Nikaia
19:00			Giannakopoulos 60'; Alexandris 66'	Stadium: Neapoli Stadium; Attendance: 4,507; Referee: Iraklis Tsikinis

3 March 2002 18	Olympiacos	3–0	Egaleo	Marousi
15:00	Alexandris 24'; Giannakopoulos 52', 90'			Stadium: Olympic Stadium; Attendance: 12,611; Referee: Ioakim Efthimiadis

10 March 2002 19	Skoda Xanthi	1–2	Olympiacos	Xanthi
17:00	Vallas 15'		Karembeu 21'; Ofori-Quaye 45'	Stadium: A.O. Xanthi Stadium; Attendance: 7,478; Referee: Athanassios Briakos

17 March 2002 20	Olympiacos	6–0	Ethnikos Asteras	Marousi
15:00	Đorđević 7' (pen.); Alexandris 39'; Giovanni 59'; Ofori-Quaye 67', 68', 72'			Stadium: Olympic Stadium; Attendance: 7,290; Referee: Georgios Tsagarakis

24 March 2002 21	Panathinaikos	1–1	Olympiacos	Ampelokipoi
19:00	Olisadebe 76'		Đorđević 89' (pen.)	Stadium: Leoforos Alexandras Stadium; Attendance: 14,557; Referee: Ioakim Efthimiadis

31 March 2002 22	Olympiacos	3–0	OFI	Marousi
16:00	Đorđević 12', 57'; Ofori-Quaye 42'			Stadium: Olympic Stadium; Attendance: 22,830; Referee: Spyridon Papadakos

7 April 2002 23	Olympiacos	2–2	Akratitos	Marousi
15:30	Mavrogenidis 13'; Đorđević 78' (pen.)		Iliopoulos 39', 87'	Stadium: Olympic Stadium; Attendance: 14,382; Referee: Georgios Tsagarakis

14 April 2002 24	Panachaiki	1–3	Olympiacos	Patras
17:00	Ioannou 41'		Giannakopoulos 76', 83'; Álvez 90+2'	Stadium: Kostas Davourlis Stadium; Attendance: 9,677; Referee: Georgios Borovilos

20 April 2002 25	Olympiacos	4–3	AEK Athens	Marousi
19:00	Alexandris 43', 58'; Patsatzoglou 52'; Đorđević 90+1'		Tsiartas 24' (pen.), 75' (pen.); Lakis 90+5'	Stadium: Olympic Stadium; Attendance: 60,292; Referee: Kyros Vassaras

8 May 2002 26	Aris	1–5	Olympiacos	Thessaloniki
17:30	Liolidis 76'		Alexandris 2', 42', 80'; Papadopoulos 17' (o.g.); Đorđević 54'	Stadium: Kleanthis Vikelidis Stadium; Referee: Ioakim Efthimiadis

=== Greek Cup ===
==== Group 6 ====
Pos	Team	Pld	W	D	L	GF	GA	GD	Pts	Qualification	OLY	AGN	AEL	KAL
1	Olympiacos	6	6	0	0	26	5	+21	18	Second Round		1–0	5–3	10–0
2	Agios Nikolaos	6	3	0	3	9	11	−2	9	Second Round	1–6		3–1	2–0
3	AEL	6	2	0	4	10	14	−4	6		0–1	2–1		2–3
4	Kalamata	6	1	0	5	6	21	−15	3		1–3	1–2	1–2	

Source: epo.gr

===== Matches =====
15 August 2001 Matchday 1	Kalamata	1–3	Olympiacos	Kalamata
13:00 EEST	Athanasiadis 12' (pen.)	Report (page 16)	Zetterberg 3'; Roberts 48'; Álvez 75'	Stadium: Kalamata Municipal Stadium; Referee: Giorgos Douros (Corinthia)

29 August 2001 Matchday 2	AEL	0–1	Olympiacos	Larissa
13:00 EEST		Report (page 16)	Alexandris 44'	Stadium: Alcazar Stadium; Attendance: 5,705; Referee: Nikos Aggelakis (Thessaloniki)

7 November 2001 Matchday 3	Olympiacos	1–0	Agios Nikolaos	Marousi
13:00 EET	Antzas 25'	Report (page 17)		Stadium: Olympic Stadium; Referee: Kostas Finokaliotis (Athens)

5 September 2001 Matchday 4	Olympiacos	10–0	Kalamata	Marousi
13:00 EEST	Giovanni 6', 16', 42'; Zetterberg 28'; Alexandris 30'; Bermúdez 53'; Karembeu 55'; Patsatzoglou 58', 76'; Álvez 89'	Report (page 17)		Stadium: Olympic Stadium; Attendance: 2,384; Referee: Giorgos Borovilos (Arcadia)

3 October 2001 Matchday 5	Olympiacos	5–3	AEL	Marousi
13:00 EEST	Alexandris 4', 8'; Niniadis 30', 70' (pen.); Álvez 60'	Report (page 17-18)	P. Giannakopoulos 38'; Tachtintis 65'; Ziagas 87'	Stadium: Olympic Stadium; Attendance: 3,068; Referee: Christoforos Zografos (Athens)

26 August 2001 Matchday 6	Agios Nikolaos	1–6	Olympiacos	Agios Nikolaos
13:00 EEST	Maris 60'	Report (page 18)	Giannakopoulos 18', 41'; Giovanni 43', 69', 80'; Castillo 54'	Stadium: Agios Nikolaos Municipal Stadium; Referee: Manolis Giannadakis (Lasithi)

==== Second round ====
Olympiacos qualified to the Round of 16 without a match.

==== Round of 16 ====
19 December 2001 First leg	Olympiacos	5–1	Egaleo	Marousi
16:00 EET	Alexandris 44', 49', 74'; Đorđević 76'; Patsatzoglou 88'	Report (page 36)	Meidanis 38'	Stadium: Olympic Stadium; Attendance: 1,050; Referee: Spyros Papadakos (Laconia)

16 January 2002 Second leg	Egaleo	0–3 (1–8 agg.)	Olympiacos	Kallithea
18:30 EET		Report (page 37)	Giannakopoulos 17'; Álvez 44', 63'	Stadium: Grigoris Lamprakis Stadium; Attendance: 132; Referee: Lambros Gouvas (Arta)

==== Quarter-finals ====
31 January 2002 First leg	Olympiacos	3–0	Kallithea	Marousi
17:15 EET	Antzas 72'; Giovanni 78', 86'	Report (page 39)		Stadium: Olympic Stadium; Attendance: 1,687; Referee: Kyros Vassaras (Thessaloniki)

7 February 2002 Second leg	Kallithea	0–4 (0–7 agg.)	Olympiacos	Kallithea
14:30 EET		Report (page 40)	Alexandris 27'; Bermúdez 35'; Álvez 49'; Giovanni 80'	Stadium: Grigoris Lamprakis Stadium; Attendance: 1,730; Referee: Nikos Angelakis (Thessaloniki)

==== Semi-finals ====
13 March 2002 First leg	Olympiacos	3–2	Iraklis	Marousi
18:30 EET	Koutsoures 60' (o.g.); Alexandris 66', 81'	Report (page 41)	Fofonka 30'; Kebadze 42'	Stadium: Olympic Stadium; Attendance: 8,930; Referee: Spyros Papadakos (Laconia)

10 April 2002 Second leg	Iraklis	0–3 (2–6 agg.)	Olympiacos	Thessaloniki
18:30 EEST		Report (page 41)	Đorđević 24', 75'; Alexandris 44'	Stadium: Kaftanzoglio Stadium; Attendance: 11,250; Referee: Thanasis Briakos (Epirus)

==== Final ====
27 April 2002 Final	AEK Athens	2–1	Olympiacos	Marousi
21:00 EEST	Konstantinidis 52'; Ivić 82'	Report	Giovanni 70'	Stadium: Olympic Stadium; Attendance: 45,258; Referee: Thanasis Briakos (Epirus)

=== UEFA Champions League ===
==== Group stage ====
Pos	Team	Pld	W	D	L	GF	GA	GD	Pts	Qualification
1	(Spain) Deportivo La Coruña	6	2	4	0	10	8	+2	10	Advance to second group stage
2	(England) Manchester United	6	3	1	2	10	6	+4	10	Advance to second group stage
3	(France) Lille	6	1	3	2	7	7	0	6	Transfer to UEFA Cup
4	(Greece) Olympiacos	6	1	2	3	6	12	−6	5	

Source: RSSSF

All times at CET

18 September 2001 1	Deportivo La Coruña (Spain)	2–2	(Greece) Olympiacos	A Coruña, Spain
20:45	Fran 22'; Valerón 90+4'	Report	Giannakopoulos 80'; Oforiquaye 83'	Stadium: Estadio Riazor; Attendance: 20,873; Referee: Jan Wegereef (Netherlands)

25 September 2001 2	Lille (France)	3–1	(Greece) Olympiacos	Lens, France
20:45	Bakari 33'; Cheyrou 44'; Tafforeau 79'	Report	Giannakopoulos 90+1'	Stadium: Stade Félix-Bollaert; Attendance: 35,777; Referee: Stuart Dougal (Scotland)

10 October 2001 3	Olympiacos (Greece)	0–2	(England) Manchester United	Athens, Greece
20:45		Report	Beckham 66'; Cole 82'	Stadium: Olympic Stadium; Attendance: 73,550; Referee: Graziano Cesari (Italy)

17 October 2001 4	Olympiacos (Greece)	2–1	(France) Lille	Athens, Greece
20:45	Alexandris 53'; Niniadis 64'	Report	Bassir 38'	Stadium: Olympic Stadium; Attendance: 25,755; Referee: Alfredo Trentalange (Italy)

23 October 2001 5	Manchester United (England)	3–0	(Greece) Olympiacos	Manchester, England
20:45	Solskjær 79'; Giggs 88'; Van Nistelrooy 90+4'	Report		Stadium: Old Trafford; Attendance: 66,769; Referee: Vítor Melo Pereira (Portugal)

31 October 2001 6	Olympiacos (Greece)	1–1	(Spain) Deportivo La Coruña	Athens, Greece
20:45	Alexandris 51'	Report	Capdevila 84'	Stadium: Olympic Stadium; Attendance: 20,293; Referee: Markus Merk (Germany)

== Team kit ==
Supplier: Umbro
Sponsor(s): Siemens Mobile

Home	Away	Third

Source: Olympiacos FC
