= 1999–2000 Beta Ethniki =

Beta Ethniki
- Season: 1999–2000
- Dates: 18 September 1999 – 4 June 2000
- Champions: Athinaikos
- Promoted: Athinaikos; PAS Giannina
- Relegated: Naoussa; Ethnikos Piraeus; Ialysos; Pierikos; Anagennisi Karditsa; Veria

Beta Ethniki 1999–2000 complete season.

== League table ==
Location of teams in 1999–2000 Beta Ethniki

Pos	Team	Pld	W	D	L	GF	GA	GD	Pts	Promotion or relegation
1	Athinaikos (C, P)	34	21	8	5	56	21	+35	71	Promotion to Alpha Ethniki
2	Egaleo	34	22	4	8	57	28	+29	70	Qualification for Promotion play-off
3	PAS Giannina (P)	34	20	6	8	52	23	+29	66	Qualification for Promotion play-off
4	Panserraikos	34	19	8	7	54	27	+27	65	Qualification for Promotion play-off
5	Apollon Kalamarias	34	16	9	9	50	33	+17	57	
6	AEL	34	16	7	11	55	39	+16	55	
7	Panegialios	34	14	9	11	47	46	+1	51	
8	Panetolikos	34	14	8	12	43	34	+9	50	
9	Olympiacos Volos (Note: Ethnikos Olympiacos Volos had 1 point deducted.)	34	15	5	14	52	41	+11	49 (Note: Head-to-head record: Ethn. Olympiacos Volos: 7 pts (4–2), Kallithea: 6 pts (4–5), Agios Nikolaos: 4 pts (4–5).)	
10	Kallithea	34	14	7	13	40	35	+5	49	
11	Agios Nikolaos (O)	34	14	7	13	44	40	+4	49	Qualification for Relegation play-off
12	Veria (R)	34	13	8	13	37	40	−3	47	Qualification for Relegation play-off
13	Panelefsiniakos (O)	34	12	9	13	50	49	+1	45	Qualification for Relegation play-off
14	Naoussa (R)	34	10	7	17	37	52	−15	37	Relegation to Gamma Ethniki
15	Ethnikos Piraeus (R)	34	7	8	19	53	72	−19	29	Relegation to Gamma Ethniki
16	Ialysos (R)	34	7	4	23	26	78	−52	25	Relegation to Gamma Ethniki
17	Pierikos (R)	34	4	7	23	15	62	−47	19	Relegation to Gamma Ethniki
18	Anagennisi Karditsa (R)	34	4	7	23	31	79	−48	19	Relegation to Gamma Ethniki

(C) Champions; (O) Play-off winners; (P) Promoted; (R) Relegated

== Results ==
Home \ Away	AEL	AGN	KRD	APL	ATH	EGA	ETH	IAL	KLT	NAO	EOV	PNT	PNG	PNF	PSE	PAS	PIE	VER
AEL		2–0	2–1	1–1	1–0	0–0	3–3	3–2	3–0	2–1	2–1	1–0	4–1	5–0	1–0	2–0	4–1	0–0
Agios Nikolaos	3–0		4–1	0–2	2–0	2–0	4–1	3–0	1–2	2–0	1–1	0–2	1–1	2–1	1–1	2–1	2–0	2–3
Anagennisi Karditsa	1–7	1–2		1–2	1–3	1–1	1–1	2–0	0–0	2–2	0–2	2–0	1–1	1–2	0–1	0–1	0–0	4–3
Apollon Kalamarias	0–0	2–0	2–0		0–0	1–2	4–1	6–0	1–0	3–1	2–2	3–0	0–3	2–1	0–1	1–2	0–0	1–0
Athinaikos	2–1	3–0	3–0	2–1		1–0	3–0	5–1	3–0	3–0	1–0	3–1	3–0	2–1	0–0	1–0	1–0	1–0
Egaleo	3–1	4–0	5–0	1–1	2–0		2–1	3–1	1–1	3–1	1–0	4–2	6–2	1–0	0–0	2–1	2–0	2–0
Ethnikos Piraeus	0–1	0–0	1–1	2–2	1–4	2–0		7–1	1–2	4–2	3–2	2–2	1–2	0–1	0–1	1–3	1–2	4–0
Ialysos	1–0	1–0	5–1	0–0	0–1	0–2	1–5		2–1	1–0	1–2	0–3	0–0	2–0	0–6	0–1	1–0	0–2
Kallithea	0–1	2–1	0–1	2–1	0–0	1–0	2–4	6–1		3–1	0–1	1–0	4–1	2–2	2–1	1–0	4–0	1–0
Naoussa	2–1	2–3	2–1	0–4	1–1	0–1	2–1	1–1	0–0		2–1	3–0	1–0	1–0	2–3	2–1	2–0	0–0
Olympiacos Volos	1–0	0–1	6–0	0–0	0–0	0–1	5–2	3–1	2–0	1–0		1–0	1–0	0–3	2–1	0–1	4–0	1–0
Panetolikos	1–1	3–1	4–0	1–0	2–1	0–1	1–0	3–0	0–0	1–1	2–0		4–0	1–1	1–0	0–0	3–0	0–1
Panegialios	3–2	1–0	2–1	2–0	1–1	2–0	3–0	2–1	1–1	1–1	3–3	1–2		1–0	4–1	3–2	3–0	2–0
Panelefsiniakos	2–2	1–1	3–2	0–2	1–2	2–1	5–2	2–2	1–1	3–2	2–1	0–2	2–0		1–1	1–0	7–1	2–0
Panserraikos	4–2	1–0	4–3	0–1	1–1	1–0	5–0	2–0	1–0	1–0	3–0	1–1	2–1	3–1		0–0	1–0	3–0
PAS Giannina	2–0	0–0	3–0	2–0	2–1	1–0	3–0	3–0	2–0	3–0	3–1	1–0	0–0	3–1	2–1		4–0	2–0
Pierikos	2–0	0–2	2–0	0–2	0–3	1–2	2–2	2–0	0–1	0–2	0–1	1–1	0–0	0–0	0–2	1–1		0–3
Veria	1–0	1–1	3–1	0–3	1–1	2–4	0–0	1–0	1–0	1–0	5–1	3–0	1–0	1–1	1–1	2–2	1–0	

Legend: Blue = home team win; Yellow = draw; Red = away team win.

== Promotion play-off ==
Team 1	Score	Team 2
Egaleo	2–2	Panserraikos
PAS Giannina	3–1	Panserraikos
Egaleo	1–1	PAS Giannina

Pos	Team	Pld	W	D	L	GF	GA	GD	Pts	Promotion
1	PAS Giannina (P)	2	1	1	0	4	2	+2	4	Promotion to Alpha Ethniki
2	Egaleo	2	0	2	0	3	3	0	2	
3	Panserraikos	2	0	1	1	3	5	−2	1	

(P) Promoted

== Relegation play-off ==
Team 1	Score	Team 2
Agios Nikolaos	1–0	Veria
Veria	1–2	Panelefsiniakos
Agios Nikolaos	not played	Panelefsiniakos

Pos	Team	Pld	W	D	L	GF	GA	GD	Pts	Relegation
1	Panelefsiniakos	1	1	0	0	2	1	+1	3	
2	Agios Nikolaos	1	1	0	0	1	0	+1	3	
3	Veria (R)	2	0	0	2	1	3	−2	0	Relegation to Gamma Ethniki

(R) Relegated

== Top scorers ==
Rank	Player	Club	Goals
1	(Greece) Giorgos Papandreou	Ethnikos Piraeus/Athinaikos	24
2	(Brazil) Ademar	Anagennisi Karditsa/Panserraikos	18
3	(France) Karim Mouzaoui	Apollon Kalamarias	17
4	(Greece) Kostas Kormaris	PAS Giannina	12
4	(Federal Republic of Yugoslavia) Žarko Dragaš	AEL	12
4	(Greece) Giannis Providas	Veria	12
7	(Greece) Giorgos Zacharopoulos	Kallithea	11
7	(Albania) Elton Koça	Panegialios	11
