= 2000–01 Beta Ethniki =

First Division
- Season: 2000–01
- Dates: 16 September 2000 – 19 May 2001
- Champions: Egaleo
- Promoted: Egaleo; Akratitos
- Relegated: Nafpaktiakos Asteras; Panetolikos; Kavala; Trikala; AEL; Panelefsiniakos

The 2000–01 Beta Ethniki was the 39th season since the official establishment of the second tier of Greek football in 1962 and under the name First Division (Greek: Α΄ Κατηγορία).

== League table ==
Location of teams in 2000–01 Beta Ethniki

Pos	Team	Pld	W	D	L	GF	GA	GD	Pts	Promotion or relegation
1	Egaleo (C, P)	30	19	7	4	58	27	+31	64	Promotion to Alpha Ethniki
2	Akratitos (P)	30	15	9	6	51	34	+17	54	Promotion to Alpha Ethniki
3	Proodeftiki	30	14	5	11	43	31	+12	47	
4	Apollon Kalamarias	30	11	11	8	35	30	+5	44	
5	Panserraikos	30	12	8	10	47	39	+8	44	
6	Apollon Athens	30	13	5	12	34	33	+1	44	
7	Olympiacos Volos	30	13	5	12	38	31	+7	44	
8	Kallithea	30	12	8	10	43	32	+11	44	
9	Nafpaktiakos Asteras (R)	30	11	9	10	44	40	+4	42	Qualification for Relegation play-off
10	Agios Nikolaos (O)	30	12	6	12	37	42	−5	42	Qualification for Relegation play-off
11	Panetolikos (R)	30	12	6	12	39	45	−6	42	Qualification for Relegation play-off
12	Panegialios (O)	30	10	9	11	38	42	−4	39	Qualification for Relegation play-off
13	Kavala (R)	30	11	2	17	37	57	−20	35	Relegation to Gamma Ethniki
14	Trikala (R)	30	9	5	16	29	54	−25	32	Relegation to Gamma Ethniki
15	AEL (R)	30	8	6	16	28	41	−13	30	Relegation to Gamma Ethniki
16	Panelefsiniakos (R)	30	4	7	19	28	51	−23	19	Relegation to Gamma Ethniki

(C) Champions; (O) Play-off winners; (P) Promoted; (R) Relegated

== Results ==
Home \ Away	AEL	AGN	APA	APL	AKR	EGA	KLT	KAV	NAP	OLV	PNG	PNF	PNT	PSE	PRO	TRI
AEL		1–0	1–2	1–1	2–3	2–2	0–1	1–1	1–0	1–0	0–0	2–0	2–0	2–1	1–2	2–3
Agios Nikolaos	1–0		1–1	3–2	2–1	0–0	1–0	5–2	2–1	2–1	2–1	1–0	3–2	2–1	1–1	3–0
Apollon Athens	2–0	1–0		1–0	3–1	1–2	2–0	2–1	1–1	1–0	2–0	1–0	1–2	1–2	0–0	2–1
Apollon Kalamarias	2–0	2–1	0–2		0–2	0–0	1–0	5–0	0–0	2–1	0–1	1–0	1–2	2–1	0–0	0–0
Akratitos	2–1	3–2	2–0	1–1		1–1	1–0	1–0	1–1	2–0	2–2	3–0	3–0	4–4	1–0	2–0
Egaleo	1–1	4–1	5–2	3–0	1–1		0–0	5–1	2–1	3–0	1–0	2–0	1–2	3–2	2–1	4–0
Kallithea	2–1	1–0	0–0	2–2	0–1	2–0		4–1	2–0	4–1	2–1	3–1	4–0	2–2	1–3	5–2
Kavala	1–0	0–0	2–1	2–0	2–0	0–2	3–5		1–5	1–0	2–1	2–1	3–0	0–1	2–3	2–0
Nafpaktiakos Asteras	0–1	2–1	2–1	2–1	1–3	1–3	1–1	2–1		2–2	1–1	1–1	1–0	3–0	3–1	3–0
Olympiacos Volos	2–0	2–0	2–1	1–1	1–0	3–1	2–0	3–0	4–0		1–1	2–0	1–1	2–1	2–1	2–1
Panegialios	3–1	2–1	1–1	1–1	2–2	0–1	0–0	1–4	2–3	1–0		3–2	2–1	3–2	1–0	2–1
Panelefsiniakos	5–2	2–2	3–0	1–2	0–2	3–4	0–0	2–1	0–2	0–2	0–1		3–2	1–1	1–1	1–1
Panetolikos	1–0	2–0	1–2	2–0	1–0	0–1	2–1	2–1	1–1	0–0	4–2	1–1		2–1	3–3	4–0
Panserraikos	1–1	3–0	1–0	0–1	2–2	1–0	1–1	2–0	1–0	1–0	2–2	2–0	2–0		1–1	6–1
Proodeftiki	0–1	4–0	1–0	0–2	2–2	1–2	1–0	3–0	1–0	2–1	2–1	2–0	5–1	2–0		2–0
Trikala	2–0	0–0	1–0	1–3	3–2	0–2	2–0	0–1	4–4	1–0	1–0	2–0	0–0	1–2	1–0	

Legend: Blue = home team win; Yellow = draw; Red = away team win.

== Relegation play-off ==
Team 1	Agg.	Team 2	1st leg	2nd leg	3rd leg
Nafpaktiakos Asteras	4–5	Panegialios	2–2	0–2	2–1
Agios Nikolaos	8–4	Panetolikos	3–1	2–2	3–1

== Top scorers ==
Rank	Player	Club	Goals
1	(Greece) Thomas Makris	Egaleo	16
2	(Greece) Georgios Zacharopoulos	Kallithea	15
3	(Greece) Lefteris Velentzas	Akratitos	13
3	(Greece) Georgios Vlachoudis	Olympiacos Volos	13
3	(Greece) Christos Karapitsos	Panegialios	13
6	(Greece) Stavros Labriakos	Apollon Athens	12
6	(Greece) Karim Mouzaoui	Apollon Kalamarias	12
6	(Greece) Dimitrios Papadopoulos	Akratitos	12
9	(Greece) Anestis Agritis	Egaleo	11
9	(Greece) Christoforos Andriadakis	Agios Nikolaos	11
