= 2001–02 Gamma Ethniki =

Gamma Ethniki
- Season: 2001–02
- Champions: Kerkyra
- Promoted: Kerkyra; Kassandra; Fostiras; Kavala; Atromitos
- Relegated: Panelefsiniakos; Panetolikos; Apollon Krya Vrysi

The 2001–02 Gamma Ethniki was the 19th season since the official establishment of the third tier of Greek football in 1983. Kerkyra was crowned champion, thus winning promotion to Beta Ethniki. Kassandra, Fostiras, Kavala and Atromitos also won promotion due to expansion of Beta Ethniki from 14 to 16 teams.

Panelefsiniakos, Panetolikos and Apollon Krya Vrysi were relegated to Delta Ethniki.

== League table ==
Location of teams in 2001–02 Gamma Ethniki

Pos	Team	Pld	W	D	L	GF	GA	GD	Pts	Promotion or relegation
1	Kerkyra (C, P)	30	17	12	1	44	17	+27	63	Promotion to Beta Ethniki
2	Kassandra (P)	30	18	9	3	43	19	+24	63	Promotion to Beta Ethniki
3	Fostiras (Note: Fostiras had 3 points deducted.) (P)	30	17	8	5	51	28	+23	56	Promotion to Beta Ethniki
4	Kavala (P)	30	16	7	7	50	22	+28	55	Promotion to Beta Ethniki
5	Atromitos (P)	30	14	9	7	44	29	+15	51	Promotion to Beta Ethniki
6	Kilkisiakos	30	13	8	9	35	27	+8	47	
7	AEL	30	12	6	12	37	34	+3	42	
8	Ethnikos Piraeus	30	11	8	11	38	41	−3	41	
9	Marko	30	12	5	13	37	41	−4	41	
10	Chania	30	10	10	10	35	37	−2	40	
11	Panelefsiniakos (Note: Panelefsiniakos had 3 points deducted. Later was relegated to West Attica FCA championship due to unsettled debts.) (R)	30	9	5	16	24	43	−19	29	Relegation to FCA championships
12	Leonidio	30	5	13	12	25	35	−10	28	
13	Trikala	30	6	10	14	17	32	−15	28	
14	Nafpaktiakos Asteras	30	6	8	16	24	37	−13	26	
15	Panetolikos (R)	30	6	7	17	24	46	−22	25	Relegation to Delta Ethniki
16	Apollon Krya Vrysi (R)	30	3	5	22	14	54	−40	14	Relegation to Delta Ethniki

(C) Champions; (P) Promoted; (R) Relegated

== Results ==
Home \ Away	AEL	AKV	ATR	CHA	ETH	FOS	KSN	KAV	KER	KIL	LEO	MAR	NAP	PNF	PNT	TRI
AEL		3–0	1–1	1–0	4–1	3–0	2–2	1–2	0–0	1–2	0–0	3–1	1–0	3–1	1–0	1–0
Apollon Krya Vrysi	2–0		0–2	1–3	1–3	0–1	0–1	2–1	0–2	0–0	1–1	0–1	1–0	0–0	0–2	1–2
Atromitos	2–0	5–1		2–1	2–1	0–1	0–0	3–1	0–0	1–2	1–1	1–1	2–0	2–0	3–0	1–0
Chania	3–2	2–0	1–1		1–2	0–0	1–1	1–0	1–2	2–0	1–1	1–0	0–0	2–1	6–0	1–0
Ethnikos Piraeus	1–1	2–1	2–3	1–1		2–2	2–1	2–2	0–3	2–1	1–0	0–1	0–0	2–0	1–0	4–0
Fostiras	2–1	3–0	3–1	2–0	4–1		4–0	0–2	0–1	3–0	2–2	3–1	4–2	2–1	1–1	1–0
Kassandra	2–0	4–1	2–1	2–0	0–0	2–0		1–1	0–0	1–1	3–1	2–1	1–0	2–0	3–1	2–0
Kavala	3–1	2–0	1–2	2–0	0–0	1–1	0–1		1–1	1–0	1–0	5–0	4–0	2–0	1–0	0–0
Kerkyra	2–1	2–0	0–0	4–0	3–1	2–2	1–0	1–1		1–0	2–0	3–1	1–0	0–0	2–1	3–0
Kilkisiakos	3–1	0–0	1–1	3–0	1–0	1–0	0–1	0–3	2–0		3–0	2–3	0–0	4–1	2–0	2–1
Leonidio	0–1	2–1	2–0	4–1	1–1	0–0	1–2	0–1	1–1	1–2		1–0	1–1	1–1	2–2	0–0
Marko	0–1	3–0	3–1	2–2	1–2	0–3	1–2	1–0	1–1	1–0	2–0		2–1	2–0	1–2	2–0
Nafpaktiakos Asteras	1–2	2–0	1–2	0–0	2–1	1–1	0–0	0–2	2–2	2–0	2–0	0–1		1–2	2–0	2–1
Panelefsiniakos	1–0	1–0	1–3	1–1	2–1	1–2	0–2	1–5	0–1	0–2	1–0	3–2	2–0		2–0	0–0
Panetolikos	2–1	3–0	0–0	1–1	1–2	1–2	0–2	1–4	1–2	0–0	0–1	2–2	2–1	0–1		1–0
Trikala	0–0	1–1	2–1	1–2	2–0	1–2	0–0	2–1	0–1	0–0	1–1	0–0	2–1	1–0	0–0	

Legend: Blue = home team win; Yellow = draw; Red = away team win.
