= Fotis Papadopoulos (footballer, born 1975) =

Greek footballer

Personal information
- Full name: Fotios Papadopoulos
- Date of birth: 5 December 1975 (age 50)
- Place of birth: Prodromos, Greece
- Height: 1.84 m (6 ft 0 in)
- Position: Midfielder

Senior career*
Years	Team	Apps	(Gls)
1993–1996	Iraklis		
1996–1997	ILTEX Lykoi		
1997–1998	Nafpaktiakos Asteras		
1998–1999	Anagennisi Karditsa		
1999–2000	Panionios		
2000–2003	Panachaiki		
2003	Patraikos		
2003–2004	Paniliakos		
2004–2005	Veria		
2005	Agrotikos Asteras		
2006	Olympiacos Volos		
2006–2009	Thermaikos		
- * Club domestic league appearances and goals

Fotis Papadopoulos (Greek: Φώτης Παπαδόπουλος; born 5 December 1975) is a retired Greek football midfielder.
