= Roland Zajmi =

Albanian footballer

Personal information
- Date of birth: 6 November 1973 (age 52)
- Place of birth: Tirana, Albania
- Height: 1.77 m (5 ft 10 in)
- Position: Striker

Senior career*
Years	Team	Apps	(Gls)
1993–1995	Dinamo Tirana	61	(23)
1996	Partizani Tirana	16	(3)
1996–2000	Proodeftiki	87	(22)
2000	Atromitos	6	(0)
2000–2001	Proodeftiki	21	(3)
2001–2002	Kassandra	28	(5)
2002–2004	Proodeftiki	52	(8)
2004	Apollon Limassol	4	(1)
2005–2007	Proodeftiki	46	(5)
2007–2008	Agios Dimitrios	32	(5)
2008–2009	Pierikos	10	(0)
Total		363	(75)

International career^{‡}
1995–2000	Albania	4	(1)
- * Club domestic league appearances and goals as of 17 July 2009 ‡ National team caps and goals as of 17 July 2009

Roland Zajmi (born 6 November 1973) is an Albanian retired footballer who played the majority of his career in Greece with Proodeftiki, Atromitos, Kassandra, Agios Dimitrios and Pierikos. He also played for Dinamo/Olimpik Tirana and Partizani Tirana in Albania, Apollon Limassol in Cyprus as well as the Albania national team.

== Club career ==
Zajmi made his senior debut for hometown club Dinamo Tirana in the 1993/94 season and signed for Greek Proodeftiki, the club where he would spend most of his career, in July 1996. He appeared in 145 Alpha Ethniki matches for Proodeftiki from 1996 through 2004.

== International career ==
He made his debut for Albania in a November 1995 friendly match against Bosnia and earned a total of 4 caps, scoring 1 goal, including three friendlies in 2000. He scored against Andorra and his final international was a February 2002 Rothmans International Tournament match against Malta.
