= Giovanni (footballer, born 1972) =

Brazilian footballer and manager

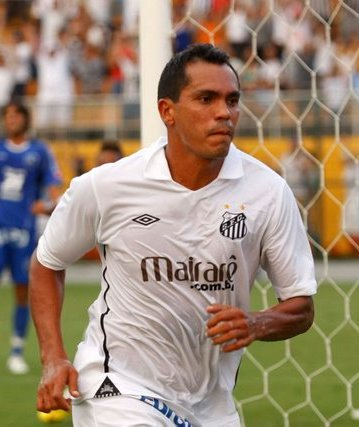
- Giovanni playing for Santos in 2005

Personal information
- Full name: Giovanni Silva de Oliverra
- Date of birth: 4 February 1972 (age 54)
- Place of birth: Belém, Brazil
- Height: 1.91 m (6 ft 3 in)
- Positions: Attacking midfielder; forward

Youth career
- 1990–1992: Tuna Luso

Senior career*
Years	Team	Apps	(Gls)
1992–1994	Tuna Luso	38	(21)
1993	→ Remo (loan)	16	(5)
1994	→ Paysandu (loan)	0	(0)
1994	→ Sãocarlense (loan)	4	(2)
1994	→ Santos (loan)	11	(1)
1995–1996	Santos	79	(60)
1996–1999	Barcelona	71	(18)
1999–2005	Olympiacos	129	(60)
2005–2006	Santos	28	(4)
2006	Al Hilal	0	(0)
2006–2007	Ethnikos Piraeus	8	(3)
2007	Sport Recife	0	(0)
2009	Mogi Mirim	16	(1)
2010	Santos	5	(1)

International career
1995–1999	Brazil	18	(6)
- * Club domestic league appearances and goals

Giovanni Silva de Oliveira (born 4 February 1972), better known as Giovanni, is a Brazilian football manager and former player. He played as either an attacking midfielder or a forward.

At club level, Giovanni most notably played for Spanish side Barcelona, Greek side Olympiacos, and Brazilian club Santos. Internationally, he played for the Brazil national team, gaining 18 caps and scoring 6 goals; he was part of the Brazilian team that reached the 1998 FIFA World Cup Final.

In his prime, Giovanni was one of Barcelona's most valuable players, but after the arrival of Louis van Gaal at the club, he got into conflict with the Dutch manager, along with fellow Brazilians Rivaldo (whom van Gaal wanted to use as a left winger, despite his protests) and Sonny Anderson. He famously called van Gaal "a Hitler for Brazilians, and an egomaniac". At Olympiacos Giovanni had the happiest and most successful days of his career, and is still remembered as a club legend by supporters.

== Club career ==
=== Early career ===
Born in Belém but raised in Abaetetuba, Pará, Giovanni started his career with lowly amateurs Taça Luz in 1990, and moved to Tuna Luso shortly after. After impressing in the youth setup, he made his first team debut in a 2–1 Copa do Brasil win over CSA, scoring a brace.

Giovanni scored 17 goals in the 1992 Campeonato Paraense, with five of them coming in a 8–0 home routing of Tiradentes. In 1993, he was loaned to Série A side Remo, but could not repeat the same success.

In 1994, after a very brief period where he featured in two friendly matches for Paysandu (where he considered quitting the sport), Giovanni played for Sãocarlense in the Campeonato Paulista Série A2. He played only four matches in two months, and was subsequently set to move to Palmeiras; however, after becoming ill while waiting for his medical, he returned to his hometown and the move never materialized.

=== Santos ===
As his last match for Sãocarlense was televised, Giovanni impressed Santos president Samir Abdul-Hak, who decided to sign him on loan until the end of the year. He made his debut for the club on 25 September, replacing Ranielli in a 4–1 away success over former club Remo, and scored his first goal on 30 October in a 1–0 win over Paraná.

For the 1995 season, Giovanni was bought by Santos, with club legend Pelé himself funding his transfer. A starter during the 1995 Campeonato Paulista, he scored a hat-trick in a 4–1 home routing of Ponte Preta. He repeated the feat on 20 October, in a victory over Grêmio for the same scoreline.

Giovanni scored 17 goals in the 1995 Série A as Santos finished runners-up in the tournament; in the semi-finals against Fluminense, Santos lost 4–1 in the first leg away, and Giovanni dyed his hair red to show faith in the team. He displayed a splendid game in the second leg and Santos managed to win 5–2, with Giovanni scoring twice and assisting the club's final goal, which was scored by Marcelo Passos. Unfortunately, he could not help Santos overcome Botafogo in the final game. Nonetheless, he is still known to many Santos supporters as "Messias" (Messiah) and his fans named themselves "Giovanni's Witnesses" – a reference to the religion "Jehovah's Witnesses".

On 7 April 1996, Giovanni scored four goals in a 8–2 win over União São João. He scored two hat-tricks against Ferroviária and Araçatuba, and finished the 1996 Paulista as the top scorer with 24 goals.

=== Barcelona ===
On 18 June 1996, Giovanni moved abroad for the first time in his career, after signing with Spanish club Barcelona, for a rumoured fee of US$ 7.8 million. He was a first team regular for two seasons and scored 18 goals overall. Barcelona fans still remember him for his ability to score game-winning goals against rivals Real Madrid. In his first year with Barcelona he won the 1996–97 UEFA Cup Winners' Cup under manager Bobby Robson. When Louis van Gaal took the lead in his third year at the club, however, he eventually fell out of favour with the Dutch manager, along with compatriot Sonny Anderson, despite scoring crucial goals in games such as the 1997 UEFA Super Cup second leg game against Borussia Dortmund. Due to his poor relationship with van Gaal, Giovanni left for Greek club Olympiacos in the summer of 1999, for a record transfer fee of £10,800,000. Later on in his career, he caused some controversy, by referring to van Gaal as a Hitler for Brazilians, and an egomaniac.

=== Olympiacos ===
In Greece, Giovanni soon established himself as one of the best players of the Greek league.

Giovanni was known for his dribbling, passing range, and ability to lob goalkeepers. He was also noted for frequently using nutmegs (playing the ball through an opponent's legs) against opposing defenders. His style of play made him popular among Olympiacos supporters. His talent and skills earned him the nickname "magos" (μάγος) "wizard" in Greece.

On 20 May 2002, Giovanni renewed with Olympiacos for three years. He was the leading goalscorer in Greece in the 2003–04 season with 21 goals.

=== Santos return ===
On 27 May 2005, Santos confirmed the return of Giovanni. During the season, he appeared in 29 games and scored four goals, but after only one match into the 2006 campaign, he was told to leave by manager Vanderlei Luxemburgo.

=== Late career ===
After his short return to Brazil, Giovanni played for several clubs abroad, such as Saudi Arabian side Al-Hilal, Greek Beta Ethniki club Ethnikos Piraeus, before returning to Brazil to play for Sport Recife in April 2007. However, weeks after arriving at the latter, he left the club as manager Alexandre Gallo also departed.

In November 2008, after more than a year without playing, Giovanni was convinced to come out of retirement by his friend Rivaldo, and signed for Mogi Mirim.

=== Second return to Santos ===
After passing the team's medical exams, Giovanni returned to Santos on 13 January 2010, with a contract until August. Although he played very few matches for the club, he finally managed to win his first title with Santos, the Campeonato Paulista. In June 2010 season, he announced his retirement from professional football.

== International career ==
Giovanni earned 18 caps with the Brazil national team, scoring six goals for the "seleção". He was a member of the team that won the 1997 Copa América, and also represented his Country during the 1998 World Cup in France, where Brazil went on to reach the final, only to suffer a 3–0 defeat to the host nation.

== Style of play ==
A versatile playmaker, his favorite position was as an attacking midfielder, but he could also play as a forward, being a goalscorer. He was predominantly known for his technique, his exceptional dribbling skills, and his outstanding flair and creativity on the ball, which saw him employ a variety of crafty moves, as well as his passing accuracy and goalscoring ability.

== Career statistics ==
=== Club ===
Club	Season	League			State League		Cup		Continental		Other		Total	
Club	Season	Division	Apps	Goals	Apps	Goals	Apps	Goals	Apps	Goals	Apps	Goals	Apps	Goals
Remo	1993	Série A	16	5	—		—		—		—		16	5
Sãocarlense	1994	Paulista A2	—		4	2	—		—		—		4	2
Santos	1994	Série A	11	1	0	0	—		0	0	0	0	11	1
Santos	1995	Série A	25	17	28	19	—		2 (Note: Appearance(s) in Supercopa Libertadores)	2	4 (Note: Appearance(s) in Copa dos Campeões Mundiais)	2	59	40
Santos	1996	Série A	0	0	26	24	1	0	0	0	—		27	24
Santos	Total		36	18	54	43	1	0	2	2	4	2	97	65
Barcelona	1996–97	La Liga	30	7	—		4	1	8 (Note: Appearance(s) in UEFA Cup Winners' Cup)	3	1 (Note: Appearance(s) in Supercopa de España)	1	43	12
Barcelona	1997–98	La Liga	27	9	—		5	2	5 (Note: Appearance(s) in UEFA Champions League)	4	4 (Note: Two appearances and one goal in UEFA Super Cup, two appearances and two goals in Supercopa de España)	3	41	18
Barcelona	1998–99	La Liga	14	2	—		1	1	6	2	2	0	23	5
Barcelona	Total		71	18	—		10	4	19	9	7	4	107	35
Olympiacos	1999–2000	Alpha Ethniki	14	8	—		3	3	6 (Note: Five appearances and four goals in UEFA Champions League, one appearance in UEFA Cup)	4	—		23	15
Olympiacos	2000–01	Alpha Ethniki	19	7	—		11	11	8 (Note: Six appearances and three goals in UEFA Champions League, two appearances in UEFA Cup)	3	—		38	21
Olympiacos	2001–02	Alpha Ethniki	21	4	—		8	10	4	0	—		33	14
Olympiacos	2002–03	Alpha Ethniki	22	10	—		4	1	5	0	—		31	11
Olympiacos	2003–04	Alpha Ethniki	28	21	—		7	2	6	1	—		41	24
Olympiacos	2004–05	Alpha Ethniki	25	10	—		8	2	9 (Note: Six appearances in UEFA Champions League, three appearances in UEFA Cup)	0	—		42	12
Olympiacos	Total		129	60	—		41	29	38	8	—		208	97
Santos	2005	Série A	27	4	—		—		2 (Note: Appearance(s) in Copa Sudamericana)	0	—		29	4
Santos	2006	Série A	0	0	1	0	0	0	0	0	—		1	0
Santos	Total		27	4	1	0	0	0	2	0	—		30	4
Ethnikos	2006–07	Beta Ethniki	8	3	—		1	0	—		—		9	3
Mogi Mirim	2009	Paulista	—		16	1	—		—		—		16	1
Santos	2010	Série A	1	0	4	1	2	0	—		—		7	1
Career total			288	108	79	47	55	33	61	19	11	6	494	213

=== International ===
Brazil national team
Year	Apps	Goals
1995	6	0
1996	4	2
1997	3	2
1998	2	1
1999	3	1
Total	18	6

=== International goals ===
Goal	Date	Venue	Opponent	Score	Result	Competition
1.	31 August 1996	Amsterdam ArenA, Amsterdam, Netherlands	Netherlands	1–0	2–2	Friendly
2.	13 November 1996	Estádio Couto Pereira, Curitiba, Brazil	Cameroon	1–0	2–0	Friendly
3.	26 February 1997	Estádio Serra Dourada, Goiânia, Brazil	Poland	1–0	4–2	Friendly
4.	26 February 1997	Estádio Serra Dourada, Goiânia, Brazil	Poland	2–0	4–2	Friendly
5.	3 June 1998	Stade Bauer, Saint-Ouen-sur-Seine, France	Andorra	1–0	3–0	Friendly
6.	5 June 1999	Estádio Fonte Nova, Salvador, Brazil	Netherlands	2–0	2–2	Friendly

== Honours ==
Barcelona

- La Liga: 1997–98, 1998–99
- Copa del Rey: 1996–97, 1997–98
- Supercopa de España: 1996
- UEFA Cup Winners' Cup: 1996–97
- UEFA Super Cup: 1997

Olympiacos

- Alpha Ethniki: 1999–2000, 2000–01, 2001–02, 2002–03, 2004–05
- Greek Cup: 2004–05; runner-up: 2000–01, 2001–02, 2003–04

Al-Hilal

- Saudi Crown Prince Cup: 2005–06
- Prince Faisal Bin Fahad Cup: 2005–06

Santos

- Copa do Brasil: 2010
- Campeonato Paulista: 2006, 2010

Brazil

- Copa América: 1997
- Umbro Cup: 1995
- FIFA World Cup runner-up: 1998

Individual

- Bola de Ouro: 1995
- Bola de Prata: 1995
- Greek Championship Foreign Footballer of the Year: 1999–2000, 2003–04
- Alpha Ethniki top scorer: 2003–04
- Greek Cup top scorer: 2000–01
- The Golden Greek football Rosters: Decade 2000–2010
