= Konstantinos Daskalakis =

Greek footballer

Personal information
- Date of birth: 6 December 1982 (age 43)
- Place of birth: Kalamata, Greece
- Height: 1.80 m (5 ft 11 in)
- Position: Midfielder

Senior career*
| Years | Team | Apps | (Gls) |
| 1999–2000 | Kalamata | | |
| 2001 | Panathinaikos | | |
| 2001–2002 | Agios Nikolaos | | |
| 2002–2003 | Marko | | |
| 2003 | Fostiras | | |
| 2004 | Proodeftiki | | |
| 2005–2006 | Messiniakos | | |
| 2006 | Panachaiki | | |
| 2007 | Agios Dimitrios | | |
| 2007–2008 | Panegialios | | |
| 2008–2009 | Panachaiki | | |
| 2009–2010 | Kalamata | | |
| 2010–2011 | Chalkida | | |
| 2011–2012 | Kalamata | | |
| 2012 | Acharnaikos | | |
| 2013 | Korinthos | | |
| 2013–2014 | Port Darwin FC | | |
| 2014–2015 | South Springvale SC | | |
- * Club domestic league appearances and goals

Konstantinos Daskalakis (Greek: Κωνσταντίνος Δασκαλάκης; born 6 December 1982) is a Greek former professional footballer who played as a midfielder.
