= Georgios Podaras =

Greek footballer

Personal information
- Date of birth: 3 October 1972 (age 54)
- Place of birth: Vrysi, Euboea, Greece
- Height: 1.78 m (5 ft 10 in)
- Position: Midfielder

Senior career*
Years	Team	Apps	(Gls)
–1999	Panelefsiniakos		
1999	Panathinaikos		
1999–2000	Apollon Athens		
2000–2002	Ethnikos Asteras		
2002	Kassandra		
2003–2005	Vyzas		
2005–2006	Thiva		
- * Club domestic league appearances and goals

Georgios Podaras (Greek: Γεώργιος Ποδαράς; born 3 October 1972) is a retired Greek football midfielder.
