= Georgios Savvidis =

Greek footballer

Personal information
- Full name: Georgios Savvidis
- Date of birth: 27 March 1974 (age 52)
- Place of birth: Kastoria, Greece
- Height: 1.80 m (5 ft 11 in)
- Position: Midfielder

Senior career*
Years	Team	Apps	(Gls)
1991–1997	Kastoria		
1997	ILTEX Lykoi		
1998–2005	Kallithea		
2005–2006	Ergotelis		
2006	Ethnikos Asteras		
2007	Kastoria		
2007–2008	Korinthos		
2008–2011	Aspropyrgos		
2011–2012	Kymi		
2012–2014	Kastoria		
- * Club domestic league appearances and goals

Georgios Savvidis (Greek: Γεώργιος Σαββίδης; born 27 March 1974) is a Greek former professional footballer who played as a midfielder.
