= Panagiotis Konstantinidis =

Greek footballer

Personal information
- Date of birth: 16 November 1969 (age 56)
- Position: Defender

Senior career*
Years	Team	Apps	(Gls)
- Pierikos
1995–1997?	Kalamata		
2000–2001?	Panionios		
2001–?	Kerkyra		
- * Club domestic league appearances and goals

Panagiotis Konstantinidis (Greek: Παναγιώτης Κωνσταντινίδης; born 16 November 1969) is a retired Greek football defender.
