= Panagiotis Giannopoulos =

Greek footballer

Personal information
- Full name: Panagiotis Giannopoulos
- Date of birth: 25 September 1972 (age 54)
- Place of birth: Piraeus, Greece
- Height: 1.92 m (6 ft 3 1/2 in)
- Position: Left-back

Senior career*
Years	Team	Apps	(Gls)
1994–1999	Proodeftiki		
1999	Aris	1	(0)
2000	Panachaiki	16	(0)
2000	Kavala	6	(1)
2001–2006	Panionios	103	(5)
2005	→ Venezia (loan)	9	(0)
2006	Argeș Pitești	6	(0)
- * Club domestic league appearances and goals as of 27 November 2015

Panagiotis Giannopoulos (Greek: Παναγιώτης Γιαννόπουλος; born 25 September 1972) is a Greek former professional footballer who played as a left-back.
