= Athanasios Demirtzoglou =

Greek footballer

Personal information
- Date of birth: 21 October 1974 (age 52)
- Place of birth: Thessaloniki, Greece
- Height: 1.81 m (5 ft 11 in)
- Position: Midfielder

Senior career*
Years	Team	Apps	(Gls)
1992–1997	Apollon Kalamarias		
1997–2000	Veria		
2000–2001	Panionios		
2001	Ethnikos Asteras		
2001–2003	Apollon Kalamarias		
2003–2004	Paniliakos		
2004–2006	Olympiacos Volos		
2006–2009	Pierikos		
2009–2011	Anagennisi Epanomi		
2011–2012	Apollon Kalamarias		
- * Club domestic league appearances and goals

Athanasios Demirtzoglou (Greek: Αθανάσιος Δεμιρτζόγλου; born 21 October 1974) is a retired Greek football midfielder.
