= Theodoros Papadimitriou =

Greek footballer

Personal information
- Date of birth: 16 September 1973 (age 53)
- Place of birth: Mytilini, Greece
- Height: 1.75 m (5 ft 9 in)
- Position: Forward

Senior career*
| Years | Team | Apps | (Gls) |
| 1998–2001 | Apollon Athens | | |
| 2001–2003 | Ethnikos Asteras | | |
- Aiolikos
- Panachaiki
- * Club domestic league appearances and goals

Theodoros Papadimitriou (Greek: Θεόδωρος Παπαδημητρίου; born 16 September 1973) is a retired Greek football striker.
