= Luis Curbelo =

Uruguayan footballer (born 1972)

Personal information
- Date of birth: 21 June 1972 (age 54)
- Position: Forward

Senior career*
Years	Team	Apps	(Gls)
1995-1996	Bella Vista		
1996-1998	TPS Turku	45	(10)
1998-2000	Liverpool Montevideo	6	(0)
2000	Deportivo Maldonado		(1)
2000-2002	Ionikos	43	(15)
2002-2004	Fostiras	5	(0)
2004–2005	Deportivo Maldonado		
- * Club domestic league appearances and goals

Luis Curbelo (born 21 June 1972) is a Uruguayan former professional footballer who played as a forward in the top-level football divisions of Uruguay, Finland and Greece.

== Career ==
Curbelo played for Bella Vista in Uruguay in 1995 before transferring in 1996 to play for TPS Turku in the Finnish Veikkausliiga, and he played 23 league games for them that season, as well as appearing in the Finnish Cup final. He made another 22 appearances for them the following season.

In 1999 Curbelo played for Liverpool FC (Montevideo) in the Uruguayan Primera División, making six league appearances for them. In 2000, he played for Deportivo Maldonado, and he scored for them on 17 March 2000 in a Primera Division match against Huracán Buceo.

Curbelo moved to Ionikos in the Super League Greece in 2000, and he made 22 League appearances for them that season (scoring ten goals). He was also at the club in the following season. In 2004 Curbelo moved back to Uruguay to rejoin Deportivo Maldonado.
