= Thomas Makris =

Greek footballer

Personal information
- Date of birth: 12 August 1978 (age 48)
- Place of birth: Larissa, Greece
- Height: 1.86 m (6 ft 1 in)
- Position: Forward

Senior career*
Years	Team	Apps	(Gls)
1994–1997	Iraklis Larissa	63	(22)
1997–1999	Skoda Xanthi	12	(1)
1999–2003	Egaleo	74	(33)
2003–2004	Chalkidona	27	(5)
2004–2006	Egaleo	19	(2)
2006–2007	Ilisiakos	28	(4)
2008	Ethnikos Asteras	12	(0)
2008–2009	Agios Dimitrios	27	(4)
2009	Chaidari	12	(3)
2010–2011	Agia Paraskevi	18	(1)
2011–2012	Elpidoforos	10	(1)
2012–2013	Egaleo	18	(3)
2013–2014	Doxa Vyronas	21	(7)
2014–2017	Ikaros Kallitheas	59	(33)
2017	Odigitria	13	(5)
Total		413	(124)
- * Club domestic league appearances and goals

Thomas Makris (Greek: Θωμάς Μακρής; born 12 August 1978) is a retired Greek football striker.

== Career ==
After playing regional league football with Iraklis Larissa, Makris began his professional football career with Xanthi F.C. He was loaned to Egaleo F.C. during 1999, the club where he would enjoy his greatest successes including winning the 2000–01 Beta Ethniki while he led the league in goal-scoring and playing in the 2004–05 UEFA Cup.
