= Elton Koça =

Albanian footballer

Personal information
- Full name: Elton Koça
- Date of birth: 5 May 1973 (age 53)
- Place of birth: Durrës, Albania
- Height: 1.87 m (6 ft 2 in)
- Position: Forward

Senior career*
Years	Team	Apps	(Gls)
1992–1996	Teuta	96	(31)
1996–1997	Lushnja	11	(4)
1997–1999	Agios Nikolaos	54	(25)
1999–2000	Panegialios	40	(18)
2001–2002	Kallithea	33	(11)
2003–2004	Levadiakos	23	(5)
Total		257	(94)

International career
1995–1996	Albania	2	(0)
- * Club domestic league appearances and goals

Elton Koça (born 5 May 1973) is a retired Albanian football player.

== Club career ==
Koça began his playing career with Teuta Durrës, the club with whom he would win the 1993–94 Albanian championship. In 1997, he moved to Greece to play for Agios Nikolaos. He would also play for Panegialios in the Beta Ethniki before joining Kallithea.

== International career ==
He made his debut for Albania in a November 1995 friendly match against Bosnia in Tirana and earned a total of 2 caps, scoring no goals. His other international was also a friendly against Bosnia in April 1996.
