= Alexis Gavrilopoulos =

Greek footballer and manager

Personal information
- Full name: Alexios Gavrilopoulos
- Date of birth: 12 July 1981 (age 45)
- Place of birth: Gastouni, Greece
- Height: 1.93 m (6 ft 4 in)
- Position: Striker

Youth career
- –1996: Aias Gastouni
- 1996–1998: Paniliakos
- 1998: Panegialios

Senior career*
| Years | Team | Apps | (Gls) |
| 1999–2001 | Levadiakos | | |
| 2001–2003 | Atromitos | 60 | (20) |
| 2004–2005 | Ionikos | 33 | (5) |
| 2005–2008 | AEL | 26 | (2) |
| 2007–2008 | → Panachaiki (loan) | | |
| 2008–2009 | Veria | 13 | (2) |

International career
- Greece U-19
- Greece U-21

Managerial career
- 2013: PFO Panopoulos
- 2015–2016: Asteras Amaliada
- 2016–2021: Achaiki
- 2021–2022: Aias Gastouni
- 2025–2026: Asteras Amaliada
- * Club domestic league appearances and goals

Alexis Gavrilopoulos (Greek: Αλέξης Γαβριλόπουλος; born 12 July 1981) is a Greek retired professional football player and a manager.

== Career ==
He is considered to be one of the most powerful and physically gifted footballers in Greece based on his body composition and muscle build. He stands at 1.93 m (6 ft 4 in) and weighs 93 kg (205 lb), and his muscle performance test results for the season 2006–2007, when he was playing with AEL, were the best in Super League Greece.

However, his strong passion during the game caused him numerous injuries throughout his career, especially on his knees, as he always pushes himself to the limits.
