= Žarko Dragaš =

Montenegrin footballer

Personal information
- Date of birth: 16 June 1971 (age 55)
- Place of birth: Pljevlja, SFR Yugoslavia
- Position: Midfielder

Senior career*
Years	Team	Apps	(Gls)
1989–1994	Budućnost Pogorica	66	(10)
1994	Rudar Pljevlja	10	(4)
1995–1996	Red Star Belgrade	8	(2)
1996	Degerfors	15	(3)
1997	Shenzhen		
1997–1998	Vojvodina	7	(1)
1998–1999	Ethnikos Asteras	24	(5)
1999–2000	Larisa	21	(7)
2000–2002	Patraikos	41	(15)
Total		192	(47)
- * Club domestic league appearances and goals

Žarko Dragaš (Cyrillic: Жарко Драгаш; born 16 June 1971) is a retired Montenegrin football player.

== Club career ==
=== Budućnost ===
Born in Pljevlja, he begin his career in 1989 by playing with FK Budućnost Podgorica, known until 1993 as FK Budućnost Titograd. The club was playing in the top national flight, known as the Yugoslav First League until 1992, then as First League of FR Yugoslavia until 1994. Budućnost usually finished in mid table, and the highlight of his spell with Budućnost was when the club finished runner-up in the Balkans Cup in 1991.

=== Rudar Pljevlja, Red Star and Degerfors ===
In summer 1994, he moved to another top league side, FK Rudar Pljevlja, but stayed only until the following winter break when he moved to Red Star Belgrade.

He played one and a half seasons with Red Star, but during that time he made only 8 league appearances and scored two goals. He was part of the team during a successful period, as in those two seasons Red Star won one national championship and two cups.

In summer 1996, he made his first move abroad by signing with Swedish side Degerfors IF. He made 15 appearances and scored 3 goals in the Allsvenskan and Degerfors finished in 9th place that season.

=== Vojvodina ===
In summer 1997 he returned to FR Yugoslavia and joined FK Vojvodina. They finished in 4th place in the 1997–98 First League of FR Yugoslavia with Žarko Dragaš contributing with 7 appearances and one goal in the league. This would be his last season in FR Yugoslavia before he moved to Greece.

=== Greece ===
In summer 1998 he signed with newly promoted Greek top-flight side Ethnikos Asteras, and played with them in the 1998–99 Alpha Ethniki which they finished 11th, with Dragaš making a solid performance of 24 appearances and 5 goals in the season. Despite that, at the end of the season he left the club and joined Beta Ethniki side Larisa which was being coached by Serbian manager Nebojša Ličanin. Despite their ambitions, and Dragaš 21 appearances and 7 goals in the league, Larisa finished 6th and failed to achieve promotion to Alpha Ethniki. Coach Ličanin left, and so did Dragaš, the latter joining 3rd level Gama Ethniki (3rd tier) Greek club Patraikos Patra. In his first season in Patras, Dragaš had quite an impressive season for a midfielder by scoring 14 goals in 35 league appearances, thus helping Patraikos to earn a promotion to the 2001–02 Beta Ethniki. He retired at the end of the following season. While playing in Greece, his wife gave birth to a first born child, Jana.

== Honors ==
Budućnost Titograd

- Balkans Cup runner-up: 1992

Red Star

- First League of FR Yugoslavia: 1994–95 First League of FR Yugoslavia
- FR Yugoslav Cup: 1995, 1996
