= Anestis Athanasiadis =

Greek footballer (born 1972)

Personal information
- Date of birth: 7 September 1972 (age 54)
- Place of birth: Ängelholm, Sweden
- Height: 1.78 m (5 ft 10 in)
- Position: Forward

Senior career*
Years	Team	Apps	(Gls)
1990–1995	AO Chania		
1995–1996	Ethnikos Piraeus		
1996–2000	Kavala		
2000–2001	Panetolikos		
2001–2002	Kalamata		
2002–2003	PAS Giannina		
2003	Panserraikos		
2003–2004	Doxa Drama		
- * Club domestic league appearances and goals

Anestis Athanasiadis (Greek: Ανέστης Αθανασιάδης; born 7 September 1972) is a Greek former professional footballer.
