= Levan Kebadze =

Georgian footballer (born in 1975)

Personal information
- Full name: Levan Kebadze
- Date of birth: 1 February 1975 (age 51)
- Place of birth: Tbilisi, Georgia
- Height: 1.83 m (6 ft 0 in)
- Position: Striker

Senior career*
Years	Team	Apps	(Gls)
1994–1995	Metalurgi Rustavi	3	(0)
1995–1996	Margveti Zestaponi	15	(10)
1996–1998	Torpedo Kutaisi	37	(12)
1999	Dinamo Tbilisi	13	(1)
2000	Lokomotivi Tbilisi	14	(9)
2000	Iraklis	14	(4)
2000–2001	PAS Giannina	25	(3)
2001–2003	Iraklis	18	(2)
2003–2005	Enosis Neon Paralimni	58	(26)
2005–2012	Ethnikos Achnas	166	(29)
2012	Omonia Aradippou	8	(0)

International career
1996–1997	Georgia U21	10	(1)
- * Club domestic league appearances and goals

Levan Kebadze (born 1 February 1975) is a former football striker from Georgia.
