= Grigoris Lamprakis Stadium =

Sports venue in Kallithea, Athens, Greece

Coordinates: 37.9601°N 23.7151°E

- El Paso
- Interactive map of Grigoris Lamprakis Stadium
- Former names: Kallithea Municipal Stadium
- Location: Kallithea, Athens, Greece
- Capacity: 6,300
- Surface: Grass

Construction
- Built: 1970
- Opened: 1970

Tenants
- Athens Kallithea FC (1970–present); Ethnikos Piraeus FC (2017–2021)

Grigoris Lamprakis Stadium is a public multi-use stadium in Kallithea, Athens, Greece.

It is currently used mostly for football matches and is the home stadium of Athens Kallithea FC.

The stadium was built in 1970 and currently has a seating capacity of 6,300.

== Name and nickname ==
The stadium is named after the Greek socialist, politician and peace activist Grigoris Lambrakis.

It is commonly referred to by its nickname "El Paso" (Greek: Ελ Πάσο), a reference to Clint Eastwood's 1965 Spaghetti Western film For a Few Dollars More (which had the Greek title Duel in El Paso), as the stadium was built on the site of a quarry and features a tall rock along the north side of the pitch, which was thought to be reminiscent of scenes from the film.

== Gallery ==
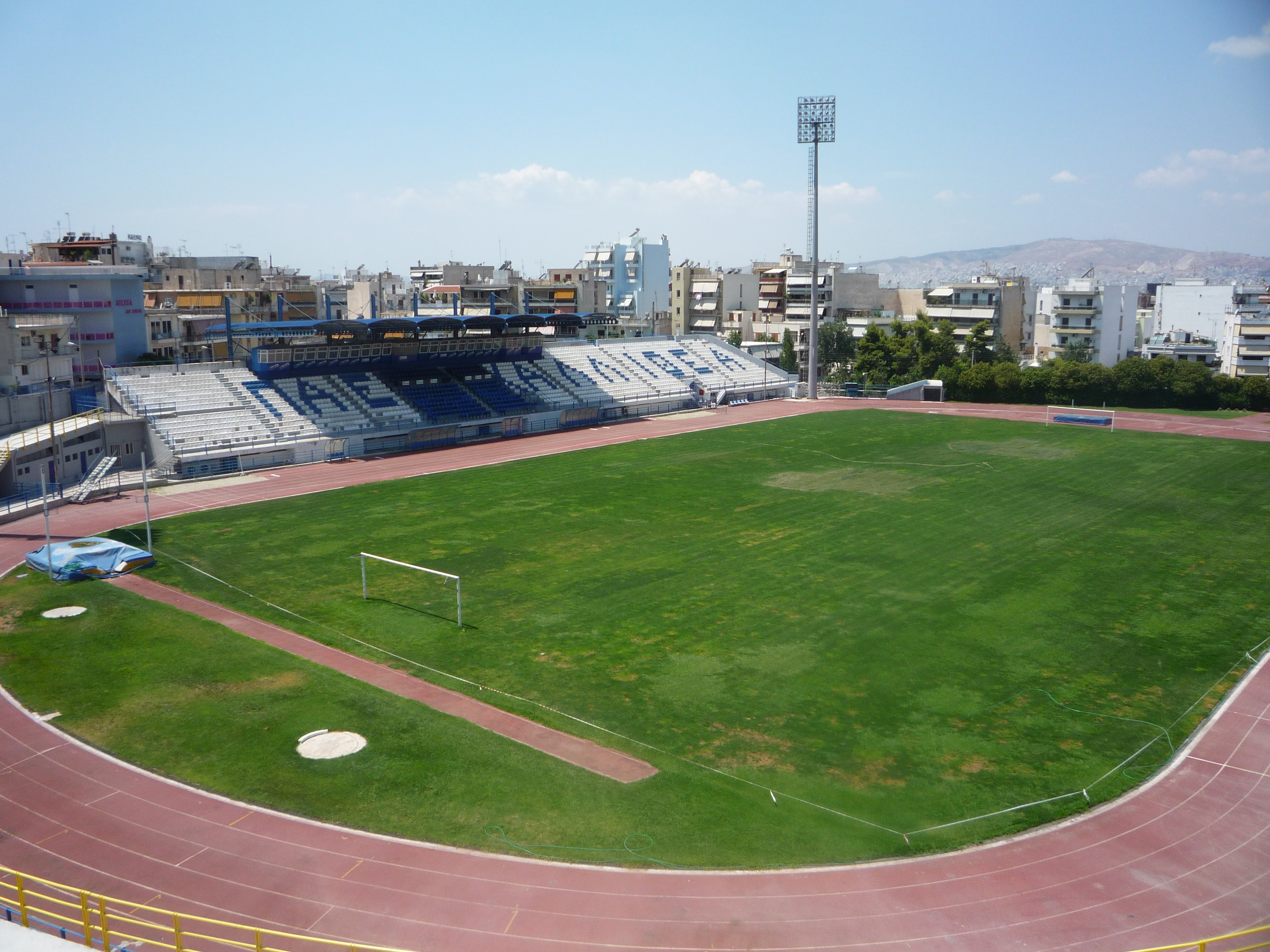
Oldest photo

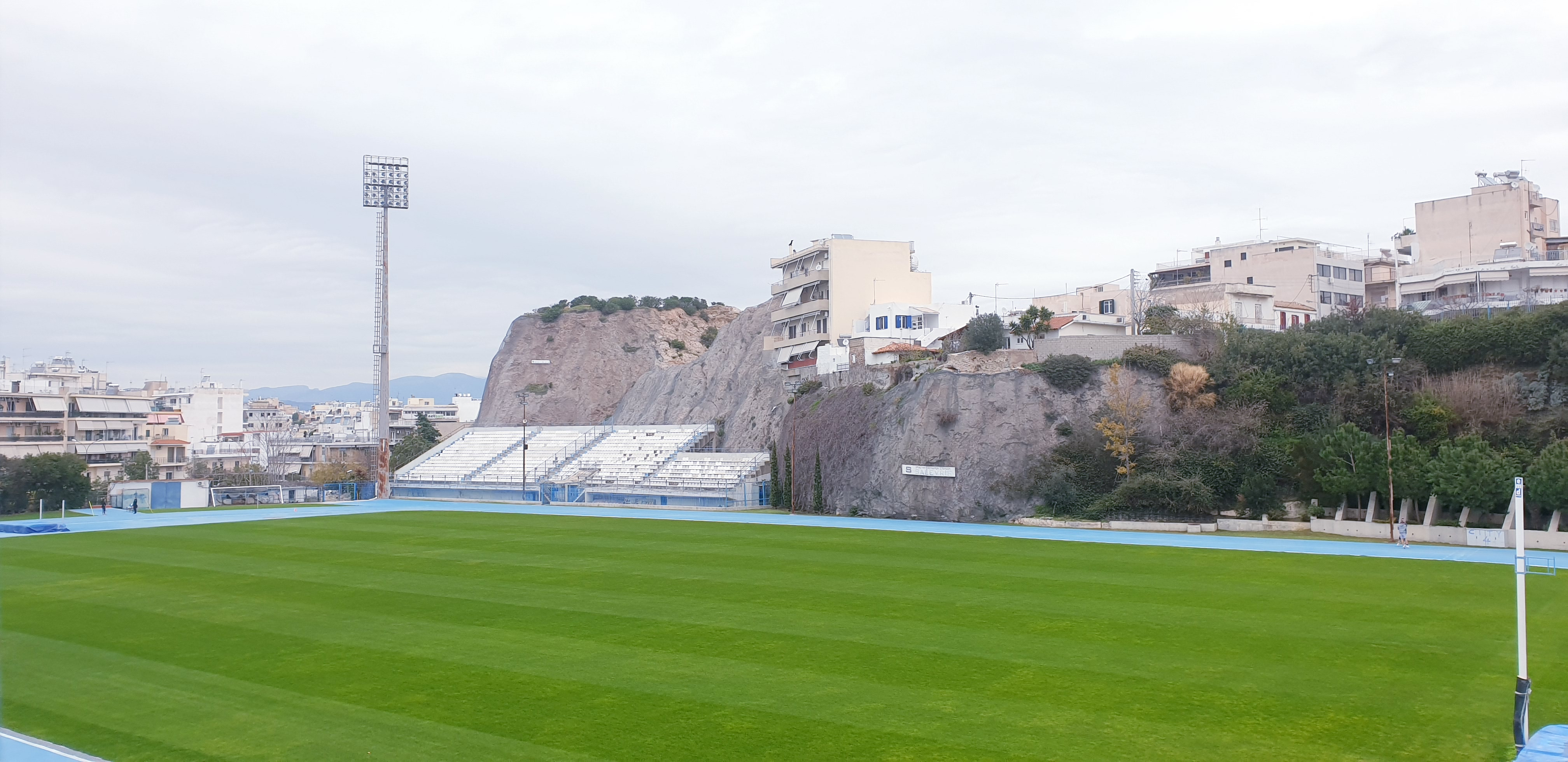
Panoramic view of the stadium from the height of the hill
