= Zizi Roberts =

Liberian footballer

Personal information
- Date of birth: 19 July 1979 (age 47)
- Place of birth: Monrovia, Liberia
- Height: 1.79 m (5 ft 10 in)
- Position: Striker

Senior career*
Years	Team	Apps	(Gls)
1994–1997	Junior Professional	0	(0)
1997–1999	AC Milan	0	(0)
1997–1998	→ Monza (loan)	27	(5)
1998–1999	→ Ravenna (loan)	18	(1)
1999	→ Bellinzona (loan)	13	(6)
2000	Ionikos	15	(8)
2000–2001	Panionios	30	(13)
2001–2002	Olympiacos	8	(5)
2003–2005	Colorado Rapids	17	(9)

International career
1996–2003	Liberia	31	(9)
- * Club domestic league appearances and goals

Kolubah "Zizi" Roberts (born 19 July 1979) is a Liberian former professional footballer who played as a forward. He began his professional career in 1996 at the age of 17 and played for teams in Liberia, the United States, Switzerland, Greece, and Italy.

== Club career ==
In 1997, Roberts signed for A.C. Milan but never played an official match for them, appearing in friendly competitions and being loaned out to Monza in 1997, Ravenna in 1998, and Bellinzona for the first half of the 1999–2000 season.

In January 2000, he signed for Greek side Ionikos, finishing out the season before moving to Panionios at the start of the following season. In August 2001, he signed with Olympiacos, where he found relative success, scoring five times in just eight appearances. Roberts left for the United States in 2003, signing with Major League Soccer side Colorado Rapids in August. In two years with the Rapids, he appeared in 17 games, scoring six goals.

== International career ==
Roberts was a regular for the Liberia national team between 1997 and 2003. In all, he played 31 games for Liberia, scoring nine goals. In 2003, the final year of his national team career, he was named Liberian Soccer Player of the Year.

== Honors ==
Olympiacos

- Alpha Ethniki: 2001–02

Individual

- Liberian Soccer Player of the Year: 2003
