= Dimitrios Maris =

Greek footballer

Personal information
- Full name: Dimitrios Maris
- Date of birth: 24 June 1979 (age 47)
- Place of birth: Athens, Greece
- Height: 1.75 m (5 ft 9 in)
- Position: Defender

Youth career
- Preveza

Senior career*
Years	Team	Apps	(Gls)
1995–1997	Odisseas Nidriou	48	(54)
1997–1999	Preveza	43	(11)
1999–2002	AOAN	82	(23)
2002–2003	Fostiras	23	(2)
2003–2004	Panileiakos	25	(2)
2004	Aris Limassol	10	(0)
2004–2006	Digenis Morphou	36	(3)
2006–2008	AEK Larnaca	29	(1)
2008–2009	AC Omonia	15	(9)
2009–2010	Alki Larnaca	30	(3)
2011	Doxa Katokopias	6	(0)
2011–2012	Omonia Aradippou	9	(0)
2012	→THOI Lakatamia(loan)	11	(3)
2012–2016	THOI Lakatamia	80	(64)

Managerial career
- 2014–: THOI Lakatamia (academies director)
- * Club domestic league appearances and goals as of 10 October 2015

Dimitrios Maris (Greek: Δημήτριος Μάρης; born 24 June 1979) is a Greek footballer who plays as a defender. His best position is right full-back but he can be used also on the left wing. Since January 2014, THOI hired him as director of football academies of the club.

== Club career ==
Maris previously played for are Preveza, AOAN, Fostiras, Panileiakos, Aris Limassol, Digenis Morphou, AEK Larnaca, AC Omonia, Alki Larnaca, Doxa Katokopias and Omonia Aradippou.

== Personal ==
Maris is married to a Cypriot woman named Anna.
