= Konstantinos Kormaris =

Greek footballer

Personal information
- Full name: Konstantinos Kormaris
- Date of birth: 29 June 1973 (age 53)
- Place of birth: Kastoria, Greece
- Height: 1.80 m (5 ft 11 in)
- Position: Forward

Senior career*
Years	Team	Apps	(Gls)
1992–1997	Kastoria		
1997–2001	PAS Giannina		
2001–2002	Iraklis		
2002–2003	Kerkyra		
2004	Olympiacos Volos		
2004–2006	Agrotikos Asteras		
2006–2007	Neoi Epivates		
2007–2008	Ethnikos Katerini		
2008–2009	Anagennisi Epanomi		
- * Club domestic league appearances and goals

Konstantinos Kormaris (Greek: Κωνσταντίνος Κορμαρής; born 29 June 1973) is a retired Greek football striker.

== Club career ==
Kormaris started his career from Megas Alexandros Kallithea before moving to Astrapi Mesopotamia and then AGS Kastoria in 1992. He won promotion to Alpha Ethniki with Kastoria in 1996 playing in Greek top flight in the 1996-97 season. In 1997 he signed for PAS Giannina playing for four season and in 2001 Iraklis agreed with his club for his transfer, the most expensive of his career. He later played for second and third division clubs in Greece.
