= Dimitris Meidanis =

Greek footballer

Personal information
- Full name: Dimitrios Meidanis
- Date of birth: 15 June 1974 (age 52)
- Place of birth: Ellopia, Boeotia, Greece
- Height: 1.87 m (6 ft 2 in)
- Position: Defender

Senior career*
Years	Team	Apps	(Gls)
1994–1997	Levadiakos		
1997–1999	Panachaiki		
1999–2004	Egaleo		
2004–2006	Olympiakos Nicosia		
2006–2007	Aris Limassol		
2007–2009	Vyzas		
2009–2010	Agios Dimitrios		
- * Club domestic league appearances and goals

Dimitris Meidanis (Greek: Δημήτρης Μεϊδάνης; born 15 June 1974) is a Greek retired football defender.
