= Zisis Ziagas =

Greek footballer

Personal information
- Full name: Zisis Anastasios Ziagas
- Date of birth: 22 September 1972 (age 54)
- Place of birth: Larissa, Greece
- Height: 1.90 m (6 ft 3 in)
- Position: Defensive midfielder

Senior career*
Years	Team	Apps	(Gls)
1995–1997	Tyrnavos	46	(11)
1997–1998	Iraklis	25	(0)
1998–2007	AEL	173	(10)
2011–2012	Keravnos Parapotamos		

Managerial career
- 2007–2008: AEL (academy director)
- 2008–2011: AEL (team manager)
- 2011: AEL (scout)
- 2012–2016: Keravnos Parapotamos
- 2016–2018: AEL (youth coach)
- 2018–2021: Elassona
- 2021–2023: AEL (youth coach)
- 2023–2024: Elassona
- 2024–2025: AE Kileler
- 2025: Anthoupoli Larissa
- * Club domestic league appearances and goals

Zisis Ziagas (Greek: Ζήσης Ζιάγκας; born 22 September 1972) is a Greek former professional footballer who played as a midfielder.
