= Ederson Fofonka =

Brazilian footballer (born 1974)

Personal information
- Full name: Ederson Fofonka
- Date of birth: 12 March 1974 (age 52)
- Place of birth: Porto Alegre, Brazil
- Height: 1.82 m (6 ft 0 in)
- Position: Forward

Senior career*
Years	Team	Apps	(Gls)
1999–2000	Defensor Sporting		
2000–2004	Iraklis	85	(25)
2004–2005	UAG Tecos	4	(1)
2005–2006	Kerkyra	14	(4)
2006–2007	Defensor Sporting	12	(4)
2007–2008	Panserraikos	13	(2)
2008–2009	Defensor Sporting	5	(1)
2013–2014	Trouville Universitario	5	(8)
- * Club domestic league appearances and goals as of 14 November 2012

Ederson Fofonka (born 12 March 1974) is a retired football forward.

During his club career, Ederson played for Defensor Sporting, Iraklis, UAG Tecos, Kerkyra and Panserraikos.
