= Georgios Kontopoulos =

Greek footballer

Personal information
- Date of birth: 16 November 1970 (age 55)
- Place of birth: Athens, Greece
- Height: 1.76 m (5 ft 9 in)
- Position: Forward

Senior career*
| Years | Team | Apps | (Gls) |
| –1996 | Levadiakos | | |
| 1996–1997 | Ilisiakos | | |
| 1997–2004 | Ethnikos Asteras | | |
| 2004–2005 | Agios Dimitrios | | |
| 2006 | Olympiakos Neon Liosion | | |
- * Club domestic league appearances and goals

Georgios Kontopoulos (Greek: Γεώργιος Κοντόπουλος; born 16 November 1970) is a retired Greek football striker.
