= Gabriel Álvez =

Uruguayan footballer (born 1974)

Gabriel Alvez
Personal information
- Full name: Jorge Gabriel Álvez Fernández
- Date of birth: 26 December 1974 (age 51)
- Place of birth: Montevideo, Uruguay
- Height: 1.84 m (6 ft 0 in)
- Position: Forward

Senior career*
Years	Team	Apps	(Gls)
1992–1995	Defensor Sporting		
1995–1998	Independiente	45	(5)
1998–2000	Nacional	67	(40)
2000–2002	Olympiacos	30	(19)
2003	Nacional	12	(8)
2003–2004	Pachuca	34	(11)
2004	Morelia	7	(0)
2005	Nacional	28	(5)
2006	Bella Vista	26	(5)
2007	Junior	12	(2)
2007	Real Cartagena	6	(1)
2007–2008	Bella Vista	6	(0)
2008	Fénix	15	(4)
2008–2009	Central Español	0	(0)
2010–2012	El Tanque Sisley	18	(6)
2012	Rampla Juniors	5	(1)

International career
1999–2000	Uruguay	8	(1)
- * Club domestic league appearances and goals

Jorge Gabriel Álvez Fernández (born 26 December 1974 in Montevideo) is a former Uruguayan footballer.

== Club career ==
Alvez has spent most of his career in Uruguay, Argentina and Mexico, notably playing for Defensor Sporting, Nacional and Bella Vista as well as Independiente in the Primera División de Argentina and Pachuca and Morelia in the Primera División de México.

== International career ==
From 1999 to 2000, Alvez made eight appearances for the senior Uruguay national football team.

== Honours ==
=== National team ===
- Uruguay
  - 1999 Copa América: 2nd place

Olympiacos

- Alpha Ethniki : 2000–01, 2001–02

Pachuca

- Mexico Primera División : Apertura 2003
