= Karim Mouzaoui =

French footballer (born 1975)

Personal information
- Full name: Karim Hocine Mouzaoui
- Date of birth: 20 November 1975 (age 50)
- Place of birth: Bitche, France
- Height: 1.86 m (6 ft 1 in)
- Position: Forward

Youth career
- Haguenau
- Strasbourg

Senior career*
| Years | Team | Apps | (Gls) |
| 1996–1997 | Haguenau | 18 | (4) |
| 1997–1999 | Strasbourg | 2 | (0) |
| 1998–1999 | → Laval (loan) | 29 | (3) |
| 1999–2001 | Apollon Kalamarias | 48 | (29) |
| 2001–2003 | Panionios | 37 | (10) |
| 2003–2005 | Apollon Limassol | 17 | (7) |
| 2005–2006 | Apollon Kalamarias | 33 | (5) |
| 2006–2007 | Kastoria | 10 | (0) |
| 2007 | Veria | 5 | (0) |
| 2008 | Pierikos | | |
| 2008–2009 | Makedonikos | | |
| 2010 | Haguenau | | |
- * Club domestic league appearances and goals

Karim Mouzaoui (born 20 November 1975) is a French former footballer of Algerian descent who played as a forward.

Mouzaoui began his professional career with Strasbourg, but only played two Ligue 1 matches for the club, and was loaned out to Laval where he played in 29 Ligue 2 matches. (Note: Karim Mouzaoui – French league stats at LFP – also available in French (archived)) He moved to Greece and played for Apollon Kalamarias in the Greek Beta Ethniki, before moving to Greek Alpha Ethniki side Panionios. While at Panionios, Mouzaoui was suspended for four months after failing a doping test in January 2003.

Next, Mouzaoui spent two seasons with Cypriot side Apollon Limassol before returning to Greece where he would play for Apollon Kalamarias and Veria in the Super League Greece.

In 2008, he joined Makedonikos of the Greek Third Division.
