= Nafpaktiakos Asteras F.C. =

Nafpaktiakos Asteras
- Full name: "Papacharalambeios Athlitikos Syllogos Nafpaktiakos Asteras"
- Founded: 1958; 68 years ago
- Ground: Papacharalabeio Ethniko Stadio
- Capacity: 1,650
- Chairman: Dinos Tsoukalas
- Manager: Periklis Papapostolou
- League: Aetoloacarnania FCA First Division
- 2025–26: Aetoloacarnania FCA Second Division (Group 1), 3rd (promoted)
- Website: Official website
Home colours	Away colours

Nafpaktiakos Asteras (Greek: Π.Α.Σ. Ναυπακτιακός Αστέρας) is a Greek football club based in the town of Nafpaktos, Greece.

== History ==
It was formed by the conjunction of two former clubs of the city: Nafpaktiakos and Asteras Nafpaktou, in 1958. The club's (full name: "Papacharalambeios Athlitikos Syllogos Nafpaktiakos Asteras"), as well as the team's home stadium (Papacharalabeio Ethniko Stadio), are named in the honour of Dimitrios Papacharalambous, a benefactor of the city.

Playing matches in local leagues until 1981, the club was promoted to the National Amateur Division - one below Beta Ethniki at that time - where it remained for a period of 3 years, only to be relegated again into local leagues, where in its turn remained for 10 years.

In 1991, Nafpaktiakos Asteras gained promotion to Delta Ethniki. After 6 years, it gained promotion to Gamma Ethniki. Following 3 years in that division, the club reached Beta Ethniki, but only to remain there for a year. Then, in the 2002–03 season, it was relegated to Delta Ethniki. In the 2006–07 season it competed in Gamma Ethniki, but it was relegated finishing 16th. In the summer of 2011, Nafpaktiakos Asteras merged with Akadimia Nafpaktou and the new club competed in the local A1 league for 2011–12 season. In the 2016–17 season, it went out third in a group to rise to Greece's third category.

Most of its footballers not only originate from Naupactus, which offers them an extra motive to play, but also are of a young age, offering the club continuity and bright future.

== Honours ==
=== Domestic ===
  - Gamma Ethniki Champions: 1
    - 1999–00
  - Delta Ethniki Champions: 3
    - 1995–96, 2005–06, 2009–10
  - Aetoloacarnania FCA Champions: 5
    - 1980–81, 1990–91, 2012–13, 2015–16, 2017–18
  - Aetoloacarnania FCA Cup Winners: 7
    - 1980–81, 1990–91, 1992–93, 1994–95, 2004–05, 2008–09, 2013–14
  - Aetoloacarnania FCA Super Cup Winners: 2
    - 2014, 2017
