= Kassandra F.C. =

Greek football club

Kassandra
- Full name: Kassandra Football Club
- Founded: 1947; 78 years ago as Aris Kassandreias
- Dissolved: 2004; 21 years ago merged with Olympiacos Volos
- Ground: Municipal Stadium of Kassandreia
- Capacity: 2,040
Home colours	Away colours

Kassandra Football Club was a Greek football club based in Kassandra, Chalkidiki, Greece. Its colours were red and white.

== History ==
Kassandra Athletic Club was a Greek football club based in Kassandria in the prefecture of Chalkidiki. The team was founded in 1947 and held its home games at the Municipal Stadium of Kassandreia, with a capacity of 2,040 spectators.

They started its course as "Aris Kassandreias" in 1968, from the championships of the then newly established FCA Chalkidiki, where they became the champion of the top category of the prefecture, in the periods 1992–93 and 1999–2000, a period in which she achieved a double, as well as winning the prefecture cup, while the following period, 2000–01, they were crowned for the second time cup winner. They were then renamed as the "Kassandra Athletic Club" and competed in the championship of the Delta Ethniki, in which it was crowned champion in the Fourth Group, for the period 2000–01, while winning promotion to the Gamma Ethniki.

They participated as a professional association club under the name "A.C. Kassandra Football Club", in the Gamma Ethniki in the period 2001–02, finishing in second place in the standings, when it was promoted to the Beta Ethniki. They remained there for two consecutive periods. In the summer of 2004, after an agreement between the people of A.C. Kassandra F.C., with the heads of the steering committee of the football department of Olympiacos Volos, the club was renamed A.S.K. Olympiacos Volos Football Club, with the club of Chalkidiki, in essence, no longer exists.

In 2005 a new team was created with the name "Aris Kassandreia 2005", as a continuation of the tradition of the previous one and which is also based at the Municipal Stadium of Kassandreia.

== Honours ==
=== Leagues ===
- Delta Ethniki (Fourth National Division)

Winners (1): 2000–01

- FCA Chalkidiki Championship (Local Championship)

Winners (2): 1992–93, 1999–2000

- FCA Chalkidiki Cup (Local Cup)

Winners (2): 1999–2000, 2000–01
