= A.O. Agios Nikolaos F.C. =

Greek football club

AOAN
- Full name: Αθλητικός Όμιλος Αγίου Νικολάου Κρήτης; Athlitikós Ómilos Aghíou Nikoláou Krítis (Athletic Club of Agios Nikolaos Crete)
- Nicknames: Κυανόλευκοι (The Blue-whites); Αστέρι (Stars)
- Short name: AOAN
- Founded: 1947; 79 years ago
- Ground: Agios Nikolaos Municipal Stadium
- Capacity: 2,000
- Chairman: Emmanouil Makrakis
- Manager: Nikos Sourgias
- League: Gamma Ethniki
- 2025–26: Lasithi FCA First Division, 2nd (promoted)
Home colours	Away colours

A.O. Agios Nikolaos Football Club, also known simply as AOAN, short for Athlitikós Ómilos Aghíou Nikoláou Krítis (Greek: Αθλητικός Όμιλος Αγίου Νικολάου Κρήτης, translated Athletic Club of Agios Nikolaos Crete), is a Greek association football club based in Agios Nikolaos, Lasithi, Crete.

== History ==
The club was founded in 1947. Its crest is a star and its colors are blue and white. They currently compete in the Gamma Ethniki, the third level football division and host their home games at the Agios Nikolaos Municipal Stadium. They have previously played in both the second and third levels of the Greek football league system.

== Honours ==
=== Domestic ===
- Delta Ethniki (4th National Division)
  - Winners (1): 1993–94

=== Regional ===
- Lasithi FCA Championship
  - Winners (4): 1989−90, 2010−11, 2012−13, 2018−19
- Lasithi FCA Cup
  - Winners (9): 1983−84, 1984−85, 1985−86, 1986−87, 1987−88, 1988−89, 1989−90, 1993−94, 2004−05
- Lasithi FCA Super Cup
  - Winners (3): 2020, 2022, 2024
- Heraklion FCA Championship
  - Winners (1): 1979−80
- Heraklion FCA Cup
  - Winners (1): 1979−80
