= 1997–98 PAOK FC season =

PAOK
1997–98 season
- President: Giorgos Batatoudis
- Manager: Angelos Anastasiadis
- Stadium: Toumba Stadium
- Alpha Ethniki: 4th
- Greek Cup: Semi-finals
- UEFA Cup: 2nd round
- Top goalscorer: League: Frantzeskos (17); All: Frantzeskos (22)
- Highest home attendance: 33,117 vs Arsenal
Home colours	Away colours

The 1997–98 season was PAOK Football Club's 71st in existence and the club's 39th consecutive season in the top flight of Greek football. The team entered the Greek Football Cup in third round.

== Players ==
=== Squad ===
Note: Flags indicate national team as defined under FIFA eligibility rules; some limited exceptions apply. Players may hold more than one non-FIFA nationality.

No.	Pos.	Nation	Player
1	GK	GRE	Nikolaos Michopoulos
2	DF	GRE	Panagiotis Sidiropoulos
3	DF	PER	Percy Olivares
4	DF	GRE	Tasos Tasiopoulos
5	DF	GRE	Nikos Kolompourdas
6	MF	GRE	Achilleas Zafiriou
7	MF	GRE	Theodoros Zagorakis (captain)
8	MF	GRE	Kostas Frantzeskos
9	FW	GRE	Zisis Vryzas
10	MF	GRE	Giorgos Toursounidis
11	MF	GRE	Spyros Marangos
12	MF	LBR	Joe Nagbe
14	DF	GRE	Dimitrios Kapetanopoulos
15	FW	PER	Paul Cominges

No.	Pos.	Nation	Player
16	DF	AUS	Joe Palatsides
17	DF	GRE	Panagiotis Katsouris
18	FW	GRE	Paraschos Zouboulis
19	DF	RSA	Andrew Rabutla
20	MF	GRE	Christos Velis
21	GK	GRE	Nikolaos Argyriou
23	FW	HUN	Zoltán Kovács
24	DF	GRE	Georgios Koulakiotis
28	MF	GRE	Pantelis Kafes
29	MF	GRE	Giorgos Hatzizisis
30	FW	GRE	Kostas Inebolidis
31	DF	GRE	Vangelis Nastos
33	GK	GRE	Asterios Themelis

== Transfers ==
Players transferred in

Transfer Window	Pos.	Name	Club	Fee
Summer	GK	(Greece) Nikolaos Argyriou	(Greece) Kavala	100 million Dr.
Summer	DF	(South Africa) Andrew Rabutla	(South Africa) Jomo Cosmos	?
Summer	DF	(Peru) Percy Olivares	(Mexico) Cruz Azul	?
Summer	MF	(Liberia) Joe Nagbe	(Switzerland) Lugano	?
Summer	MF	(Greece) Christos Velis	(Greece) Athinaikos	?
Summer	FW	(Peru) Paul Cominges	(Peru) Melgar	?
Winter	DF	(Greece) Georgios Koulakiotis	(Greece) Veria	120 million Dr.
Winter	FW	(Hungary) Zoltán Kovács	(Hungary) Újpest	Loan

Players transferred out

Transfer Window	Pos.	Name	Club	Fee
Summer	GK	(Greece) Vangelis Pourliotopoulos	(Greece) Ionikos	Free
Summer	DF	(Greece) Giorgos Koumaropoulos	(Greece) Apollon Kalamaria	Loan
Summer	DF	(Greece) Charalampos Nikolaou	(Greece) Veria	Free
Summer	DF	(Greece) Panagiotis Karametaxas	(Greece) ILTEX Lykoi	Free
Summer	DF	(Greece) Nikos Panagiotidis	(Greece) Aris	Free
Summer	DF	(Romania) Ionel Pârvu	(Romania) Dinamo Onești	Free
Summer	FW	(Poland) Robert Dymkowski	(Poland) Pogoń Szczecin	End of loan
Summer	FW	(Australia) John Anastasiadis	(Australia) South Melbourne	Free
Summer	FW	(Greece) Antonis Gioukoudis	(Greece) Poseidon Michaniona	Free
Winter	DF	(South Africa) Andrew Rabutla	(South Africa) Jomo Cosmos	Free
Winter	MF	(Greece) Giorgos Hatzizisis	(Greece) Kavala	Free
Winter	MF	(Greece) Theodoros Zagorakis	(England) Leicester City	550 million Dr.
Winter	FW	(Greece) Kostas Inebolidis	(Greece) Ethnikos Asteras	Free

== Pre-season ==
Win Draw Loss

19 July 1997 Friendly	SpVgg Unterhaching	3–3	PAOK	Germany
			Frantzeskos; Cominges

21 July 1997 Friendly	Hermes Stuttgart	1–6	PAOK	Germany

23 July 1997 Friendly	SV Wacker Burghausen	3–1	PAOK	Germany
			Toursounidis

27 July 1997 Friendly	TSV 1860 Munich	2–2	PAOK	Germany
	35'; 57'		Frantzeskos 42'; Toursounidis 65' (pen.)

29 July 1997 Friendly	PAOK	1–0	Budapesti VSC	Thessaloniki
	Nagbe 75'			Stadium: Toumba Stadium; Referee: Papachintzios

1 August 1997 Friendly	PAOK	1–1	Rad	Thessaloniki
	Marangos 84'		Nikolić 21'	Stadium: Toumba Stadium

4 August 1997 Friendly	PAOK	5–0	Jomo Cosmos	Thessaloniki
	Marangos 2'; Zouboulis 30'; Cominges 70', 75'; Hatzizisis 76'			Stadium: Toumba Stadium; Attendance: 2,555

7 August 1997 Friendly	Poseidon Michaniona	2–4	PAOK	Michaniona
	Tsoraklidis 12'; Kotsiopoulos 34'		Toursounidis 15'; Frantzeskos 16'; Sidiropoulos 71'; Zouboulis 79'

== Competitions ==
=== Overview ===
Competition	Record							
Competition	Pld	W	D	L	GF	GA	GD	Win %
Alpha Ethniki	34	21	7	6	74	41	+33	61.76
Greek Cup	8	4	1	3	10	6	+4	50.00
UEFA Cup	6	3	2	1	14	13	+1	50.00
Total	48	28	10	10	98	60	+38	58.33

Source: Competitions

== Alpha Ethniki ==
=== Standings ===
Pos	Team	Pld	W	D	L	GF	GA	GD	Pts	Qualification or relegation
2	Panathinaikos	34	28	1	5	90	24	+66	85	Qualification for Champions League second qualifying round
3	AEK Athens	34	22	8	4	61	30	+31	74	Qualification for UEFA Cup second qualifying round
4	PAOK	34	21	7	6	74	41	+33	70	Qualification for UEFA Cup second qualifying round
5	Ionikos	34	18	8	8	46	31	+15	62	
6	Iraklis	34	14	9	11	49	45	+4	51	Qualification for Intertoto Cup second round

Source: RSSSF
Rules for classification: 1st points; 2nd head-to-head points; 3rd head-to-head goal difference; 4th decision match.

==== Results summary ====
Overall								Home						Away					
Pld	W	D	L	GF	GA	GD	Pts	W	D	L	GF	GA	GD	W	D	L	GF	GA	GD
34	21	7	6	74	41	+33	70	13	3	1	38	13	+25	8	4	5	36	28	+8

Last updated: 17 May 1998.
Source: Competitive matches

==== Results by round ====
Round	1	2	3	4	5	6	7	8	9	10	11	12	13	14	15	16	17	18	19	20	21	22	23	24	25	26	27	28	29	30	31	32	33	34
Ground	H	A	H	H	A	H	A	H	A	H	A	A	H	A	H	A	H	A	H	A	A	H	A	H	A	H	A	H	H	A	H	A	H	A
Result	D	L	D	W	D	W	W	D	L	W	W	W	W	W	W	W	W	L	W	D	D	W	L	W	W	W	L	W	W	D	W	W	L	W
Position	10	14	15	9	8	8	7	8	8	7	6	6	5	5	4	4	4	4	4	4	4	4	4	4	4	4	4	4	4	4	4	4	4	4

Source: League matches
A = Away; H = Home; W = Win; D = Draw; L = Loss

==== Matches ====
Win Draw Loss

31 August 1997 1	PAOK	0–0	AEK Athens	Thessaloniki
				Stadium: Toumba Stadium; Attendance: 30,347; Referee: Chatzis

13 September 1997 2	OFI	2–1	PAOK	Heraklion
	Anastasiou 13'; Riznić 39'		Toursounidis 15' (pen.); Nagbe (red card) 85'	Stadium: Theodoros Vardinogiannis Stadium; Attendance: 4,705; Referee: Vorgias

21 September 1997 3	PAOK	1–1	Xanthi	Thessaloniki
	Toursounidis 13'		Kyparissis 57'	Stadium: Toumba Stadium; Attendance: 8,948; Referee: Varouchas

27 September 1997 4	PAOK	4–0	Kalamata	Thessaloniki
	Frantzeskos 5'; Marangos 61'; Zouboulis 69'; Cominges 88'			Stadium: Toumba Stadium; Attendance: 4,861; Referee: Bikas

5 October 1997 5	Proodeftiki	3–3	PAOK	Piraeus
	Dagas (red card) 39'; Zajmi 61', 70'; Almanidis 90+3'		Frantzeskos 33', 89' (penalty missed) 90+1'; Vryzas (red card) 39'; Zagorakis 87' (pen.)	Stadium: Nikaia Municipal Stadium; Attendance: 3,221; Referee: Vorgias

18 October 1997 6	PAOK	2–1	Olympiacos	Thessaloniki
	Frantzeskos 34'; Toursounidis 45+2'		Ofori-Quaye 27'	Stadium: Toumba Stadium; Attendance: 26,471; Referee: Bikas

26 October 1997 7	Kavala	0–1	PAOK	Kavala
			Cominges 78'	Stadium: Anthi Karagianni Stadium; Attendance: 5,256

1 November 1997 8	PAOK	2–2	Iraklis	Thessaloniki
	Frantzeskos 29'; Olivares 61'; Marangos (red card) 64'		Konstantinou 9', 86'; Stoltidis (red card) 84'	Stadium: Toumba Stadium; Attendance: 9,007; Referee: Kalathenos

9 November 1997 9	Ionikos	3–2	PAOK	Piraeus
	Frousos 32'; Xanthopoulos 45'; Kalykas 76'		Frantzeskos 48', 60'; Toursounidis (penalty missed) 54'	Stadium: Neapoli Stadium; Referee: Velliodis

16 November 1997 10	PAOK	2–1	Panathinaikos	Thessaloniki
	Nagbe 12'; Cominges 87'		Lagonikakis 16'	Stadium: Toumba Stadium; Attendance: 16,877; Referee: Kalyvas

23 November 1997 11	Paniliakos	1–2	PAOK	Pyrgos
	Barnjak 42'; Nousias (red card) 73'		Frantzeskos 23'; Toursounidis 35'; Kolompourdas (red card) 83'	Stadium: Pyrgos Stadium; Referee: Papapetrou

30 November 1997 12	Panionios	0–3	PAOK	Athens
			Kafes 18'; Marangos 40'; Nagbe 70'	Stadium: Nea Smyrni Stadium; Attendance: 3,093; Referee: Mintiouris

7 December 1997 13	PAOK	1–0	Apollon Athens	Thessaloniki
	Nagbe 27'			Stadium: Toumba Stadium; Attendance: 4,760; Referee: Borovilos

13 December 1997 14	Panachaiki	1–4	PAOK	Patras
	Samaras 32'		Nagbe 15'; Zagorakis 28' (pen.); Kalla 68' (o.g.); Katsouris 81'	Stadium: Kostas Davourlis Stadium

21 December 1997 15	PAOK	3–1	Veria	Thessaloniki
	Marangos 29'; Frantzeskos 42'; Toursounidis (penalty missed) 69'; Kapetanopoulos 74'		Troupkos (penalty missed) 71' 88'	Stadium: Toumba Stadium; Attendance: 7,057; Referee: Vorgias

3 January 1998 16	Ethnikos Piraeus	0–1	PAOK	Piraeus
			Zouboulis 73'	Stadium: Karaiskakis Stadium; Attendance: 2,743; Referee: Velliodis

11 January 1998 17	PAOK	1–0	Athinaikos	Thessaloniki
	Kovács 90'			Stadium: Toumba Stadium; Attendance: 10,548; Referee: Chatzistavridis

18 January 1998 18	AEK Athens	3–0	PAOK	Athens
	Maladenis 17', 90+1'; Batista 57'		Kapetanopoulos (red card) 79'; Zagorakis (red card) 88'	Stadium: Nikos Goumas Stadium; Attendance: 22,129; Referee: Papoutselis

25 January 1998 19	PAOK	1–0	OFI	Thessaloniki
	Nagbe 54'			Stadium: Toumba Stadium; Attendance: 8,274

1 February 1998 20	Xanthi	2–2	PAOK	Xanthi
	Tengelidis 2'; Kyparissis 66'		Nagbe (penalty missed) 12'; Kovács 48'; Frantzeskos 64'	Stadium: Xanthi Ground; Attendance: 4,936; Referee: Ampelakias

8 February 1998 21	Kalamata	1–1	PAOK	Kalamata
	Hagan 10'		Toursounidis (penalty missed) 38'; Kovács 50'	Stadium: Kalamata Municipal Stadium; Attendance: 5,274; Referee: Kaznaferis

15 February 1998 22	PAOK	3–1	Proodeftiki	Thessaloniki
	Toursounidis 7'; Koulakiotis (red card) 12'; Frantzeskos 20', 89'		Almanidis 4'	Stadium: Toumba Stadium; Attendance: 7,855; Referee: Ampelakias

22 February 1998 23	Olympiacos	2–0	PAOK	Athens
	Karapialis 46'; Alexandris 59'			Stadium: Athens Olympic Stadium; Attendance: 32,275; Referee: Voutsaras

1 March 1998 24	PAOK	2–0	Kavala	Thessaloniki
	Frantzeskos 50'; Vryzas 77'		Athanasiadis (penalty missed) 90+2'	Stadium: Toumba Stadium; Attendance: 6,412; Referee: Douros

8 March 1998 25	Iraklis	2–3	PAOK	Thessaloniki
	Xhumba 2'; Konstantinou 64'		Kovács 42', 54'; Tasiopoulos 45'	Stadium: Kaftanzoglio Stadium; Attendance: 23,009

15 March 1998 26	PAOK	3–1	Ionikos	Thessaloniki
	Cominges 23', 26'; Frantzeskos 30'		Frousos 31'	Stadium: Toumba Stadium; Attendance: 16,420; Referee: Kaznaferis

22 March 1998 27	Panathinaikos	3–1	PAOK	Athens
	G.Ch. Georgiadis 20', 70'; G.S. Georgiadis 89'		Marangos 83'; Velis (red card) 88'	Stadium: Athens Olympic Stadium; Attendance: 10,432; Referee: Begos

29 March 1998 28	PAOK	3–2	Paniliakos	Thessaloniki
	Cominges 27'; Olivares 31'; Marangos (penalty missed) 47'; Zouboulis 80'		Kyzeridis 29'; Rosales 55'	Stadium: Toumba Stadium; Attendance: 5,967; Referee: Athanasopoulos

5 April 1998 29	PAOK	6–1	Panionios	Thessaloniki
	Toursounidis 16', 37'; Nagbe 51'; Marangos 57'; Vryzas 74'; Cominges 82'		Paiteris 68'	Stadium: Toumba Stadium; Referee: Sotiropoulos

12 April 1998 30	Apollon Athens	4–4	PAOK	Athens
	Tatsis 16', 58'; Karagounis 32'; Labriakos 83'		Cominges 27', 35' (pen.); Frantzeskos 30'; Nagbe 77'	Stadium: Rizoupoli Stadium; Referee: Begos

3 May 1998 31	PAOK	4–1	Panachaiki	Thessaloniki
	Nagbe 20'; Olivares 23'; Frantzeskos 34', 36'		Klejch 54'	Stadium: Toumba Stadium; Attendance: 6,198

10 May 1998 32	Veria	1–3	PAOK	Veria
	Pangouras 73'		Cominges 22', 55'; Vryzas 54'	Stadium: Veria Stadium; Attendance: 3,312; Referee: Stefanopoulos

13 May 1998 33	PAOK	0–1	Ethnikos Piraeus	Thessaloniki
			Athanasiadis 12'	Stadium: Toumba Stadium; Attendance: 3,434; Referee: Velliodis

17 May 1998 34	Athinaikos	0–5	PAOK	Athens
			Olivares 16'; Zouboulis 29', 58'; Kafes 44'; Toursounidis 75'	Stadium: Vyronas National Stadium

== Greek Cup ==
=== Round of 32 ===
19 November 1997 1st leg	PAOK	3–1	Proodeftiki	Thessaloniki
19:30 EET	Vryzas 8', 50'; Toursounidis 27' (pen.)	Report (pages 13-14)	Almanidis 48'	Stadium: Toumba Stadium; Attendance: 2,628; Referee: Savvas Chatzistavridis (Drama)

3 December 1997 2nd leg	Proodeftiki	1–0 (2–3 agg.)	PAOK	Piraeus
14:30 EET	Almanidis 84' (pen.)	Report (page 15)		Stadium: Nikaia Municipal Stadium; Attendance: 427; Referee: Giorgos Borovilos (Arcadia)

=== Round of 16 ===
9 January 1998 1st leg	PAOK	2–0	Ionikos	Thessaloniki
19:00 EET	Marangos 28'; Nagbe 47'	Report (pages 17-18)		Stadium: Toumba Stadium; Attendance: 11,099; Referee: Sotiris Vorgias (Athens)

29 January 1998 2nd leg	Ionikos	1–2 (1–4 agg.)	PAOK	Piraeus
14:45 EET	Staboulis 89'	Report (page 19)	Marangos 34'; Vryzas 85'	Stadium: Neapoli Stadium; Attendance: 1,150; Referee: Kostas Vallianos (Aetoloacarnania)

=== Quarter-finals ===
11 February 1998 1st leg	PAOK	2–0	Skoda Xanthi	Thessaloniki
17:30 EET	Frantzeskos 36'; Velis 84'	Report (pages 19-20)		Stadium: Toumba Stadium; Attendance: 10,565; Referee: Naoum Mintiouris (Serres)

25 February 1998 2nd leg	Skoda Xanthi	1–0 (1–2 agg.)	PAOK	Xanthi
17:30 EET	Vilanakis 13'	Report (page 20)		Stadium: A.O. Xanthi Stadium; Attendance: 2,926; Referee: Michalis Kalathenos (Dodecanese)

=== Semi-finals ===
4 March 1998 1st leg	Panionios	1–0	PAOK	Nea Smyrni
17:00 EET	Vokolos 90+2'	Report (pages 23-24)		Stadium: Nea Smyrni Stadium; Attendance: 2,217; Referee: Dionysis Stefanopoulos (Piraeus)

18 March 1998 2nd leg	PAOK	1–1 (1–2 agg.)	Panionios	Thessaloniki
17:00 EET	Vryzas 82'	Report (page 24)	Nalitzis 23'	Stadium: Toumba Stadium; Attendance: 20,345; Referee: Dimitris Begos (Argolida)

== UEFA Cup ==
=== Second qualifying round ===
12 August 1997 1st leg	PAOK (Greece)	5–3	(Slovakia) Spartak Trnava	Thessaloniki, Greece
19:45	Zagorakis 32' (pen.); Marangos 35', 45' (red card) 68'; Frantzeskos 52'; Olivares 80'	Report	Ujlaky 22', 27' (red card) 31'; Luhový 24'	Stadium: Toumba Stadium; Attendance: 26,492; Referee: Fritz Stuchlik (Austria)

26 August 1997 2nd leg	Spartak Trnava (Slovakia)	0–1 (3–6 agg.)	(Greece) PAOK	Trnava, Slovakia
		Report	Zagorakis 80'	Stadium: Anton Malatinský Stadium; Attendance: 15,850; Referee: Claude Colombo (France)

=== First round ===
16 September 1997 1st leg	PAOK (Greece)	1–0	(England) Arsenal	Thessaloniki, Greece
20:45 EEST	Tasiopoulos (yellow card) 19'; Frantzeskos 61'; Zouboulis (yellow card) 71'; Zafiriou (yellow card) 78'; Zagorakis (yellow card) 87'	Report	Wright (yellow card) 30'; Adams (yellow card) 69'; Vieira (yellow card) 89'	Stadium: Toumba Stadium; Attendance: 33,117; Referee: Manuel Díaz Vega (Spain)

30 September 1997 2nd leg	Arsenal (England)	1–1 (1–2 agg.)	(Greece) PAOK	London, England
	Bergkamp 22'; Dixon (yellow card) 23'; Adams (yellow card) 65'	Report	Tasiopoulos (yellow card) 37'; Sidiropoulos (yellow card) 74'; Vryzas 87'	Stadium: Highbury; Attendance: 37,982; Referee: Michel Piraux (Belgium)

=== Second round ===
21 October 1997 1st leg	Atlético Madrid (Spain)	5–2	(Greece) PAOK	Madrid, Spain
21:30	Vieri 10', 31', 55'; Lardín 12'; Kiko 75'	Report	Frantzeskos 19'; Marangos 65'	Stadium: Vicente Calderón Stadium; Referee: Karl-Erik Nilsson (Sweden)

4 November 1997 2nd leg	PAOK (Greece)	4–4 (6–9 agg.)	(Spain) Atlético Madrid	Thessaloniki, Greece
20:45	Frantzeskos 17'; Olivares 55'; Zagorakis 76' (pen.); Zouboulis 81'	Report	Lardín 2'; Bogdanović 28'; Santi 51'; Kiko 90'	Stadium: Toumba Stadium; Attendance: 25,378; Referee: John Rowbotham (Scotland)

== Statistics ==
=== Squad statistics ===
As of May 17, 1998

Appearances denote players in the starting lineup, with the numbers in parentheses denoting appearances as substitute.

No.	Name	Alpha Ethniki		Greek Cup		UEFA Cup		Total	
No.	Name	Apps	Goals	Apps	Goals	Apps	Goals	Apps	Goals
Goalkeepers
	(Greece) Nikolaos Michopoulos	32	0	8	0	5	0	45	0
	(Greece) Nikolaos Argyriou	3	0	0	0	1	0	4	0
Defenders
	(Peru) Percy Olivares	31	4	8	0	6	2	45	6
	(Greece) Tasos Tasiopoulos	28	1	7	0	4	0	39	1
	(Greece) Dimitrios Kapetanopoulos	24	1	7	0	5	0	36	1
	(Greece) Nikos Kolompourdas	26	0	4	0	6	0	36	0
	(Greece) Panagiotis Sidiropoulos	21	0	4	0	4	0	29	0
	(Greece) Georgios Koulakiotis	7	0	3	0	0	0	10	0
	(Greece) Vangelis Nastos	7	0	0	0	0	0	7	0
	(Greece) Panagiotis Katsouris	3	1	1	0	1	0	5	1
	(South Africa) Andrew Rabutla	0	0	0	0	1	0	1	0
Midfielders
	(Greece) Achilleas Zafiriou	33	0	6	0	5	0	44	0
	(Liberia) Joe Nagbe	31	8	6	1	6	0	43	9
	(Greece) Kostas Frantzeskos	29	17	6	1	6	4	41	22
	(Greece) Spyros Marangos	31	5	7	2	3	3	41	10
	(Greece) Giorgos Toursounidis	27	8	6	1	6	0	39	9
	(Greece) Christos Velis	23	0	6	1	6	0	35	1
	(Greece) Theodoros Zagorakis	15	2	2	0	6	3	23	5
	(Greece) Pantelis Kafes	14	2	6	0	0	0	20	2
	(Greece) Giorgos Hatzizisis	0	0	2	0	0	0	2	0
Forwards
	(Greece) Zisis Vryzas	30	3	8	4	5	1	43	8
	(Greece) Paraschos Zouboulis	27	5	4	0	6	1	37	6
	(Peru) Paul Cominges	18	11	4	0	2	0	24	11
	(Hungary) Zoltán Kovács	14	5	5	0	0	0	19	5

Source: Match reports in competitive matches, RSSSF

=== Goalscorers ===
Rank	No.	Pos.	Player	Alpha Ethniki	Greek Cup	UEFA Cup	Total
1		MF	(Greece) Kostas Frantzeskos	17	1	4	22
2		FW	(Peru) Paul Cominges	11	0	0	11
3		MF	(Greece) Spyros Marangos	5	2	3	10
4		MF	(Greece) Giorgos Toursounidis	8	1	0	9
4		MF	(Liberia) Joe Nagbe	8	1	0	9
6		FW	(Greece) Zisis Vryzas	3	4	1	8
7		FW	(Greece) Paraschos Zouboulis	5	0	1	6
7		DF	(Peru) Percy Olivares	4	0	2	6
9		FW	(Hungary) Zoltán Kovács	5	0	0	5
9		MF	(Greece) Theodoros Zagorakis	2	0	3	5
11		MF	(Greece) Pantelis Kafes	2	0	0	2
12		DF	(Greece) Dimitrios Kapetanopoulos	1	0	0	1
12		DF	(Greece) Tasos Tasiopoulos	1	0	0	1
12		DF	(Greece) Panagiotis Katsouris	1	0	0	1
12		MF	(Greece) Christos Velis	0	1	0	1
Own goals				1	0	0	1
TOTALS				74	10	14	98

Source: Match reports in competitive matches, RSSSF
