= 1999–2000 PAOK FC season =

PAOK
1999–2000 season
- Chairman: Giorgos Batatoudis
- Manager: Arie Haan; Stavros Sarafis; Dušan Bajević
- Stadium: Toumba Stadium
- Alpha Ethniki: 5th
- Greek Cup: Second round
- UEFA Cup: Second round
- Top goalscorer: League: Nikolaos Frousos (11); Dimitris Nalitzis (11); All: Nikolaos Frousos (18)
Home colours	Away colours

The 1999–00 season was PAOK Football Club’s 74th in existence and the club’s 41st consecutive season in the top flight of Greek football. The team will enter the Greek Football Cup in the First round and will also enter in UEFA Cup starting from the First round.

PAOK finished fifth in the league table.

== Players ==
=== Squad ===
Note: Flags indicate national team as defined under FIFA eligibility rules; some limited exceptions apply. Players may hold more than one non-FIFA nationality.

No.	Pos.	Nation	Player
1	GK	GRE	Nikolaos Michopoulos
16	GK	AUS	Ante Covic
32	GK	POL	Grzegorz Szamotulski
44	GK	GRE	Apostolos Papadopoulos
2	DF	YUG	Božidar Bandović
3	DF	GRE	Stelios Venetidis
4	DF	GRE	Anastasios Katsabis
5	DF	GHA	Koffi Amponsah
6	DF	YUG	Vidak Bratić
19	DF	ARG	Christian Dollberg
22	DF	GRE	Georgios Koulakiotis
23	DF	GRE	Dionysis Chasiotis
26	DF	GRE	Achilleas Zafiriou
31	DF	RUS	Omari Tetradze
30	DF	GRE	Vassilios Borbokis
7	MF	GRE	Spyros Marangos

No.	Pos.	Nation	Player
8	MF	GRE	Kostas Frantzeskos
10	MF	GRE	Giorgos Toursounidis
11	MF	GRE	Pantelis Konstantinidis
12	MF	LBR	Joe Nagbe
15	MF	GRE	Pantelis Kafes
19	MF	GRE	Georgios Fotakis
20	MF	EGY	Abdel Sattar Sabry
24	MF	GRE	Loukas Karadimos
25	MF	GRE	Triantafyllos Machairidis
9	FW	GRE	Zisis Vryzas
13	FW	COL	Adolfo Valencia
14	FW	GRE	Dimitris Salpingidis
16	FW	GRE	Nikolaos Frousos
18	FW	GRE	Georgios Georgiadis
20	FW	GRE	Dimitris Nalitzis
27	FW	CYP	Stefanos Voskaridis
28	FW	HON	Milton Núñez

== Transfers ==
Players transferred in

Transfer Window	Pos.	Name	Club	Fee
Summer	FW	(Honduras) Milton Núñez	(Uruguay) Nacional	3M €
Summer	FW	(Greece) Nikolaos Frousos	(Greece) Ionikos	1M €
Summer	DF	(Greece) Stelios Venetidis	(Greece) Xanthi	800k €
Summer	FW	(Greece) Georgios Georgiadis	(England) Newcastle	500k €
Summer	FW	(Cyprus) Stefanos Voskaridis	(Cyprus) Apollon Limassol	250k €
Summer	MF	(Greece) Loukas Karadimos	(Greece) Kavala	Free
Summer	DF	(Georgia (country)) Omari Tetradze	(Italy) Roma	Free
Summer	MF	(Greece) Fotis Kiskabanis	(Greece) Kilkisiakos	100k €
Summer	GK	(Australia) Ante Covic	(Australia) Marconi Stallions	Free
Summer	FW	(Colombia) Adolfo Valencia	(Colombia) Independiente Medellín	Free
Summer	MF	(Egypt) Abdel Sattar Sabry	(Austria) Tirol Innsbruck	Free
Summer	GK	(Poland) Grzegorz Szamotulski	(Poland) Legia Warsaw	Free
Summer	DF	(Argentina) Christian Dollberg	(Argentina) Boca Juniors	Free
Summer	MF	(Greece) Spyros Marangos	(Cyprus) Omonia	Loan return
Summer	FW	(Greece) Dimitris Salpingidis	(Greece) PAOK U20	
Summer	MF	(Greece) Dimitrios Zavadias	(Greece) Pierikos	50k €
Winter	DF	(Ghana) Koffi Amponsah	(Greece) Olympiacos	Free
Winter	FW	(Greece) Dimitris Nalitzis	(Greece) Panionios	Free
Winter	DF	(Federal Republic of Yugoslavia) Vidak Bratić	(Federal Republic of Yugoslavia) Vojvodina	Free
Winter	DF	(Greece) Vassilios Borbokis	(England) Derby County	Free

Players transferred out

Transfer Window	Pos.	Name	Club	Fee
Summer	DF	(Peru) Percy Olivares	(Greece) Panathinaikos	1M €
Summer	GK	(Greece) Nikolaos Argyriou	(Greece) Iraklis	Free
Summer	DF	(Greece) Fotis Kiskabanis	(Greece) AEL	Loan
Summer	MF	(Greece) Vasilis Samaras	(Greece) AEL	Free
Summer	DF	(Greece) Vaggelis Nastos	(Greece) AEL	Loan
Summer	DF	(Greece) Dimitrios Kapetanopoulos	(Greece) Iraklis	Free
Summer	DF	(Cameroon) Patrice Abanda	(Greece) Apollon Kalamarias	Free
Summer	MF	(Greece) Dimitrios Zavadias	(Greece) Kavala	Loan
Summer	DF	(Cameroon) Joseph Elanga	(Greece) Apollon Kalamarias	Free
Summer	MF	(Federal Republic of Yugoslavia) Slobodan Krčmarević	(Greece) Panionios	Free
Summer	MF	(Greece) Georgios Fotakis	(Greece) Kallithea	Loan
Summer	MF	(Greece) Kostas Lagonidis	Retired	
Winter	FW	(Honduras) Milton Núñez	(England) Sunderland	1.85M €
Winter	MF	(Egypt) Abdel Sattar Sabry	(Portugal) Benfica	800k €
Winter	FW	(Greece) Dimitris Salpingidis	(Greece) AEL	Loan
Winter	MF	(Greece) Giorgos Toursounidis	(Greece) Xanthi	Free
Winter	GK	(Australia) Ante Covic	(Greece) Kavala	Loan
Winter	MF	(Greece) T. Machairidis	(Portugal) Benfica	Free
Winter	DF	(Italy) Mirko Taccola	(Italy) Palermo	Free
Winter	FW	(Colombia) Adolfo Valencia	(United States) New York	Free

== Competitions ==
=== Overview ===
Competition	Record							
Competition	Pld	W	D	L	GF	GA	GD	Win %
Alpha Ethniki	34	15	10	9	64	44	+20	44.12
Greek Cup	6	5	0	1	14	2	+12	83.33
UEFA Cup	4	3	0	1	12	3	+9	75.00
Total	44	23	10	11	90	49	+41	52.27

Source: Competitions

=== Managerial statistics ===
Head coach	From	To	Record							
Head coach	From	To	G	W	D	L	GF	GA	GD	Win %
(Netherlands) Arie Haan	Start Season	28.11.1999	18	11	3	4	41	18	+23	61.11
(Greece) Stavros Sarafis (Interim)	29.11.1999	29.12.1999	4	3	0	1	8	3	+5	75.00
(Bosnia and Herzegovina) Dušan Bajević	01.01.2000	End season	22	9	7	6	41	28	+13	40.91

== Alpha Ethniki ==
=== League table ===
Pos	Team	Pld	W	D	L	GF	GA	GD	Pts	Qualification or relegation
3	AEK Athens	34	20	6	8	69	39	+30	66	Qualification for UEFA Cup first round
4	OFI	34	18	9	7	60	44	+16	63	Qualification for UEFA Cup first round
5	PAOK	34	15	10	9	64	44	+20	55	Qualification for UEFA Cup first round
6	Iraklis	34	15	5	14	58	58	0	50 (Note: Head-to-head points (goal difference): Iraklis 3 (+1), Aris 3 (-1).)	Qualification for UEFA Cup Play-offs
7	Aris	34	14	8	12	50	46	+4	50	Qualification for UEFA Cup Play-offs

Source: Galanis Sports Data
Rules for classification: 1) Points; 2) Head-to-head points; 3) Head-to-head goal difference; 4) Goal difference; 5) Goals scored; 6) Goals against; 7) Play-offs (neutral ground); 8) Draw.
(Note: Criterion 7 is only used if needed to decide champion, teams for relegation or teams for UEFA competitions).

==== Results summary ====
Overall								Home						Away					
Pld	W	D	L	GF	GA	GD	Pts	W	D	L	GF	GA	GD	W	D	L	GF	GA	GD
34	15	10	9	64	44	+20	55	10	4	3	40	18	+22	5	6	6	24	26	−2

Last updated: 28 May 2000.
Source: Competitive matches

==== Results by round ====
Round	1	2	3	4	5	6	7	8	9	10	11	12	13	14	15	16	17	18	19	20	21	22	23	24	25	26	27	28	29	30	31	32	33	34
Ground	H	H	A	H	A	H	A	H	A	A	H	A	H	A	H	A	H	A	A	H	A	H	A	H	A	H	H	A	H	A	H	A	H	A
Result	D	W	D	W	L	L	L	W	D	L	W	W	W	D	D	D	W	L	D	L	D	W	W	L	L	W	D	W	D	L	W	W	W	W
Position	6	4	7	4	7	11	12	9	9	11	8	8	6	5	6	8	7	7	7	8	7	7	7	7	8	8	8	6	6	7	6	5	5	5

Source: League matches
A = Away; H = Home; W = Win; D = Draw; L = Loss

==== Matches ====
Win Draw Loss

20 September 1999 1	PAOK	4–4	AEK Athens	Thessaloniki
--:-- EET	Marangos 15'; Dollberg 35'; Georgiadis 65'; Valencia 89'		Ćirić 1' (pen.); Nikolaidis 20'; Dollberg 23' (o.g.); Dellas 46'	Stadium: Toumba Stadium

26 September 1999 2	PAOK	4–2	Kalamata	Thessaloniki
--:-- EET	Frantzeskos 14'; Valencia 18'; Sabry 47'; Vryzas 76'		Dacroce 45'; Soares 64'	Stadium: Toumba Stadium

3 October 1999 3	Panathinaikos	1–1	PAOK	Athens
--:-- EET	Goumas 56'		Nagbe 79'	Stadium: Olympic Stadium

17 October 1999 4	PAOK	2–0	Ethnikos Asteras	Thessaloniki
--:-- EET	Dollberg 45+2'; Frousos 49'			Stadium: Toumba Stadium

24 October 1999 5	Iraklis	3–1	PAOK	Thessaloniki
--:-- EET	Velis 24'; Konstantinou 43', 60'		Frantzeskos 90+6'	Stadium: Kaftanzoglio Stadium

31 October 1999 6	PAOK	0–1	Paniliakos	Thessaloniki
--:-- EET			Gonias 21'	Stadium: Toumba Stadium

8 November 1999 7	Olympiacos	4–1	PAOK	Athens
--:-- EET	Giannakopoulos 7'; Niniadis 25'; Amanatidis 31'; Giovanni 45+1'		Frantzeskos 76'	Stadium: Olympic Stadium

21 November 1999 8	PAOK	3–0	Ionikos	Thessaloniki
--:-- EET	Valencia 17', 61'; Sabry 58' (pen.)			Stadium: Toumba Stadium

28 November 1999 9	Aris	0–0	PAOK	Thessaloniki
--:-- EET				Stadium: Kleanthis Vikelidis Stadium

5 December 1999 10	OFI	2–0	PAOK	Heraklion
--:-- EET	Pavlopoulos 8'; Nioplias 30'			Stadium: Theodoros Vardinogiannis Stadium

12 December 1999 11	PAOK	5–0	Xanthi	Thessaloniki
--:-- EET	Frousos 11', 84'; Sabry 27', 43' (pen.); Frantzeskos 41'			Stadium: Toumba Stadium

21 December 1999 12	Panachaiki	1–2	PAOK	Patra
--:-- EET	Jero Miñarro 7'		Sabry (penalty missed) 10'; Georgiadis 65'; Frousos 77'	Stadium: Kostas Davourlis Stadium

29 December 1999 13	PAOK	1–0	Proodeftiki	Thessaloniki
--:-- EET	Routzieris 88' (o.g.)			Stadium: Toumba Stadium

9 January 2000 14	Panionios	1–1	PAOK	Athens
--:-- EET	Nalitzis 76'		Frousos 68'	Stadium: Nea Smyrni Stadium

16 January 2000 15	PAOK	1–1	Apollon Smyrnis	Thessaloniki
--:-- EET	Vryzas 59'		Fortuzi 90+2'	Stadium: Toumba Stadium

23 January 2000 16	Kavala	1–1	PAOK	Kavala
--:-- EET	Koubis 47'		Valencia 85'	Stadium: Anthi Karagianni Stadium

30 January 2000 17	PAOK	2–0	Trikala	Thessaloniki
--:-- EET	Vryzas 10'; Frousos 52'			Stadium: Toumba Stadium

6 February 2000 18	AEK Athens	2–0	PAOK	Athens
--:-- EET	Nikolaidis 49', 84'			Stadium: Nikos Goumas Stadium

13 February 2000 19	Kalamata	1–1	PAOK	Kalamata
--:-- EET	Soares 49'		Bratić 16'	Stadium: Kalamata Metropolitan Stadium

20 February 2000 20	PAOK	1–3	Panathinaikos	Thessaloniki
--:-- EET	Bratić 74'		Basinas 30' (pen.); Karagounis 33'; Warzycha 69'	Stadium: Toumba Stadium

27 February 2000 21	Ethnikos Asteras	1–1	PAOK	Athens
--:-- EET	Milovanović 86'		Nalitzis 49'	Stadium: Michalis Kritikopoulos Stadium

5 March 2000 22	PAOK	4–0	Iraklis	Thessaloniki
--:-- EET	Borbokis 27', 48'; Konstantinidis 42'; Nalitzis 61'			Stadium: Toumba Stadium

11 March 2000 23	Paniliakos	0–4	PAOK	Pyrgos
--:-- EET			Nalitzis 18' (pen.); Borbokis 30', 37'; Konstantinidis 53'	Stadium: Pyrgos Stadium

19 March 2000 24	PAOK	0–2	Olympiacos	Thessaloniki
--:-- EET			Choutos 49', 57'	Stadium: Toumba Stadium

27 March 2000 25	Ionikos	1–0	PAOK	Piraeus
--:-- EET	Afentoulidis 45'			Stadium: Neapoli Stadium

2 April 2000 26	PAOK	3–2	Aris	Thessaloniki
--:-- EET	Nalitzis 45' (pen.); Konstantinidis 58'; Kafes 80'		Amponsah 71' (o.g.); Kyzeridis 90+4'	Stadium: Toumba Stadium

12 April 2000 27	PAOK	2–2	OFI	Thessaloniki
--:-- EET	Nalitzis 45'; Pavlopoulos 89' (o.g.)		Mauro Silva 21', 59'	Stadium: Toumba Stadium

17 April 2000 28	Xanthi	1–2	PAOK	Xanthi
--:-- EET	Ba (penalty missed) 68'; Patsatzoglou 74'		Nalitzis 40' (pen.); Georgiadis 53'	Stadium: Xanthi Ground

23 April 2000 29	PAOK	1–1	Panachaiki	Thessaloniki
--:-- EET	Georgiadis 40'		Solakis 11'	Stadium: Toumba Stadium

4 May 2000 30	Proodeftiki	1–0	PAOK	Athens
--:-- EET	Vilanakis 63'			Stadium: Nikaia Municipal Gymnasium

8 May 2000 31	PAOK	2–0	Panionios	Rhodes
--:-- EET	Borbokis 43'; Frousos 56'			Stadium: Rhodes stadium

13 May 2000 32	Apollon Smyrnis	3–4	PAOK	Athens
--:-- EET	Vourexakis 6'; Labriakos 62'; Papadimitriou 72'		Frousos 22'; Kafes 45+1'; Nalitzis 82', 90+2'	Stadium: Georgios Kamaras Stadium

21 May 2000 33	PAOK	5–0	Kavala	Thessaloniki
--:-- EET	Konstantinidis 11'; Nalitzis 32', 41' (pen.); Kafes 34'; Frousos 45'			Stadium: Toumba Stadium

28 May 2000 34	Trikala	3–5	PAOK	Trikala
--:-- EET	Jovanović 6', 56' (pen.); Amponsah 43' (o.g.)		Nalitzis 3' (penalty missed) 58'; Georgiadis 4'; Kafes 36'; Frousos 74', 79'	Stadium: Trikala Municipal Stadium

1-9: (Netherlands) Arie Haan 10-13: (Greece) Stavros Sarafis (Interim) 14-34: (Bosnia and Herzegovina) Dušan Bajević

== Greek Cup ==
=== Group 2 ===
Pos	Team	Pld	W	D	L	GF	GA	GD	Pts	Qualification	PAOK	AGE	OLV	VER	POS	PNC
1	PAOK	5	5	0	0	13	0	+13	15	Round of 16		2–0	—	1–0	—	5–0
2	Agersani	5	2	1	2	6	6	0	7	Round of 16	—		1–0	—	3–1	2–2
3	Olympiacos Volos	5	2	1	2	4	5	−1	7		0–2	—		2–1	—	—
4	Veria	5	2	0	3	8	6	+2	6		—	1–0	—		4–0	—
5	Poseidon Michaniona	5	1	1	3	4	11	−7	4		0–3	—	1–1	—		—
6	Panachaiki	5	1	1	3	5	12	−7	4		—	—	0–1	3–2	0–1	

Source: epo.gr

==== Matches ====
Win Draw Loss

10 August 1999 1	PAOK	2–0	Agersani	Thessaloniki
--:-- EET	[[Zisis Vryzas[Vryzas]] 40'; Frousos 60'	Report		Stadium: Toumba Stadium

22 August 1999 2	Olympiacos Volos	0–2	PAOK	Volos
--:-- EET		Report	Dollberg 47'; Frantzeskos 81'	Stadium: Volos Municipal Stadium

25 August 1999 3	PAOK	5–0	Panachaiki	Thessaloniki
--:-- EET	Marangos 11'; Frousos 12'; Frantzeskos 50'; Valencia 75', 90+3'	Report		Stadium: Toumba Stadium

29 August 1999 4	Poseidon Michaniona	0–3	PAOK	Thessaloniki
--:-- EET		Report	Georgiadis 70', 88'; Frousos 90'

13 October 1999 5	PAOK	1–0	Veria	Thessaloniki
--:-- EET	Frousos 37'	Report		Stadium: Toumba Stadium

=== Second round ===
12 January 2000	Olympiacos	2–1	PAOK	Athens
	Alexandris 2'; Giannakopoulos 54'	Report	Frousos 19'	Stadium: Olympic Stadium; Attendance: 17,317; Referee: Tsagarakis (Chania)

== UEFA Cup ==
=== First round ===
16 September 1999 1st leg	Locomotive Tbilisi (Georgia (country))	0–7	(Greece) PAOK	Tbilisi, Georgia
16:00 CET		Report	Georgiadis 16', 24'; Sabry 43'; Frousos 56', 63'; Frantzeskos 68'; Vryzas 69'	Stadium: Dinamo Arena; Attendance: 4,000; Referee: Attila Juhos (Hungary)

30 September 1999 2nd leg	PAOK (Greece)	2–0 (9–0 agg.)	(Georgia (country)) Locomotive Tbilisi	Thessaloniki, Greece
20:00 CET	Valencia 53' (pen.); Salpingidis 81'	Report		Stadium: Toumba Stadium; Attendance: 2,500; Referee: David Malcolm (Republic of Ireland)

=== Second round ===
21 October 1999 1st leg	PAOK (Greece)	1–2	(Portugal) Benfica	Thessaloniki, Greece
20:00 CET	Frantzeskos 90'	Report	Nuno Gomes 68'; Ronaldo Guiaro 90'	Stadium: Toumba Stadium; Attendance: 28,008; Referee: Dieter Schoch (Switzerland)

4 November 1999 2nd leg	Benfica (Portugal)	1–2 (a.e.t.) (3–3 agg.) (4–1 p)	(Greece) PAOK	Lisbon, Portugal
20:30 CET	Kandaurov 25'	Report	Marangos 28'; Sabry 44'	Stadium: Estádio da Luz; Attendance: 30,000; Referee: Roelof Luinge (Netherlands)
	Penalties
	Ronaldo Guiaro (penalty scored); Maniche (penalty scored); Chano (penalty scored); Paulo Madeira (penalty scored)		(penalty missed) Frousos; (penalty missed) Machairidis; (penalty scored) Bandović

== Statistics ==
=== Squad statistics ===
As of 28 May 2000

Appearances denote players in the starting lineup, with the numbers in parentheses denoting appearances as substitute.

No.	Name	Alpha Ethniki		Greek Cup		UEFA Cup		Total	
No.	Name	Apps	Goals	Apps	Goals	Apps	Goals	Apps	Goals
Goalkeepers
1	(Greece) Nikolaos Michopoulos	17 (1)	0	4	0	1	0	22 (1)	0
16	(Australia) Ante Covic	4	0	2	0	3	0	9	0
	(Poland) Grzegorz Szamotulski	14	0	0	0	0	0	14	0
Defenders
2	(Federal Republic of Yugoslavia) Božidar Bandović	8 (1)	0	4 (1)	0	3 (1)	0	15 (3)	0
3	(Greece) Stelios Venetidis	27	0	4	0	3	0	34	0
4	(Greece) Anastasios Katsabis	27 (3)	0	4	0	2	0	33 (3)	0
5	(Ghana) Koffi Amponsah	7 (1)	0	0	0	0	0	7 (1)	0
6	(Federal Republic of Yugoslavia) Vidak Bratić	11 (1)	2	0	0	0	0	11 (1)	2
22	(Greece) Georgios Koulakiotis	9 (4)	0	1	0	1	0	11 (4)	0
23	(Greece) Dionysis Chasiotis	22 (1)	0	3	0	1	0	26 (1)	0
26	(Greece) Achilleas Zafiriou	1 (1)	0	2	0	1	0	4 (1)	0
31	(Georgia (country)) Omari Tetradze	27 (2)	0	3	0	3	0	33 (2)	0
	(Argentina) Christian Dollberg	7	2	4	1	3	0	14	3
	(Greece) Vassilios Borbokis	19	5	1	0	0	0	20	5
Midfielders
7	(Greece) Spyros Marangos	25 (5)	1	4	1	3	1	32 (5)	3
8	(Greece) Kostas Frantzeskos	28 (12)	4	4 (1)	2	3 (3)	2	35 (16)	8
10	(Greece) Giorgos Toursounidis	0	0	3 (1)	0	1	0	4 (1)	0
11	(Greece) Pantelis Konstantinidis	24 (3)	4	4 (1)	0	1 (1)	0	29 (5)	4
12	(Liberia) Joe Nagbe	20 (3)	1	4 (1)	0	4 (1)	0	28 (5)	1
15	(Greece) Pantelis Kafes	26 (14)	4	2	0	2	0	30 (14)	4
20	(Egypt) Abdel Sattar Sabry	12 (1)	4	2	0	3	2	17 (1)	6
24	(Greece) Loukas Karadimos	15 (8)	0	4 (3)	0	2 (1)	0	21 (12)	0
	(Greece) Triantafyllos Machairidis	9 (1)	0	3	0	4 (1)	0	16 (2)	0
Forwards
9	(Greece) Zisis Vryzas	24 (13)	3	5 (2)	1	4 (2)	1	33 (17)	5
13	(Colombia) Adolfo Valencia	14 (8)	5	3 (1)	2	2	1	19 (9)	8
14	(Greece) Nikolaos Frousos	25 (8)	11	6 (2)	5	3 (1)	2	34 (11)	18
18	(Greece) Georgios Georgiadis	26 (3)	5	4 (1)	2	2	2	32 (4)	9
20	(Greece) Dimitris Nalitzis	16	11	0	0	0	0	16	11
27	(Cyprus) Stefanos Voskaridis	2 (2)	0	0	0	0	0	2 (2)	0
22	(Honduras) Milton Núñez	10 (6)	0	1 (1)	0	0	0	11 (7)	0
	(Greece) Dimitris Salpingidis	0	0	0	0	1 (1)	1	1 (1)	1

Source: Match reports in competitive matches, uefa.com, epo.gr, RSSSF

=== Goalscorers ===
Rank	No.	Pos.	Player	Alpha Ethniki	Greek Cup	UEFA Cup	Total
1	14	FW	(Greece) Nikolaos Frousos	11	5	2	18
2	20	FW	(Greece) Dimitris Nalitzis	11	0	0	11
3	18	FW	(Greece) Georgios Georgiadis	5	2	2	9
4	13	FW	(Colombia) Adolfo Valencia	5	2	1	8
5	8	MF	(Greece) Kostas Frantzeskos	4	2	2	8
6	20	MF	(Egypt) Abdel Sattar Sabry	4	0	2	6
7		DF	(Greece) Vassilios Borbokis	5	0	0	5
8	9	FW	(Greece) Zisis Vryzas	3	1	1	5
9	15	MF	(Greece) Pantelis Kafes	4	0	0	4
10	11	MF	(Greece) Pantelis Konstantinidis	4	0	0	4
11		DF	(Argentina) Christian Dollberg	2	1	0	3
12	7	MF	(Greece) Spyros Marangos	1	1	1	3
13	6	DF	(Federal Republic of Yugoslavia) Vidak Bratić	2	0	0	2
14	12	MF	(Liberia) Joe Nagbe	1	0	0	1
15		FW	(Greece) Dimitris Salpingidis	0	0	1	1
Own goals				2	0	0	2
TOTALS				64	14	12	90

Source: Match reports in competitive matches, uefa.com, epo.gr, RSSSF
