= 1998–99 PAOK FC season =

PAOK
1998–99 season
- President: Giorgos Batatoudis
- Manager: Oleg Blokhin; Angelos Anastasiadis; Arie Haan
- Stadium: Toumba Stadium
- Alpha Ethniki: 4th
- Greek Cup: Round of 16
- UEFA Cup: 2nd qualifying round
- Top goalscorer: League: Frantzeskos (8); All: Frantzeskos, Kafes (8)

The 1998–99 season was PAOK Football Club's 72nd in existence and the club's 40th consecutive season in the top flight of Greek football. The team entered the Greek Football Cup in first round.

== Players ==
=== Squad ===
Note: Flags indicate national team as defined under FIFA eligibility rules; some limited exceptions apply. Players may hold more than one non-FIFA nationality.

No.	Pos.	Nation	Player
—	GK	GRE	Nikolaos Michopoulos
—	GK	GRE	Nikolaos Argyriou
—	GK	GRE	Asterios Themelis
—	DF	PER	Percy Olivares
—	DF	YUG	Božidar Bandović
—	DF	ITA	Mirko Taccola
—	DF	GRE	Anastasios Katsabis
—	DF	GRE	Dimitrios Kapetanopoulos
—	DF	GRE	Georgios Koulakiotis
—	DF	GRE	Nikos Kolompourdas
—	DF	GRE	Vangelis Nastos
—	DF	GRE	Vasilios Samaras
—	MF	GRE	Giorgos Toursounidis (captain)
—	MF	GRE	Achilleas Zafiriou

No.	Pos.	Nation	Player
—	MF	GRE	Kostas Frantzeskos
—	MF	LBR	Joe Nagbe
—	MF	GRE	Pantelis Kafes
—	MF	GRE	Pantelis Konstantinidis
—	MF	GRE	Triantafyllos Macheridis
—	MF	GRE	Christos Velis
—	MF	GRE	Kostas Lagonidis
—	MF	AUT	Dietmar Berchtold
—	MF	UZB	Abdukahhor Marifaliev
—	FW	GRE	Zisis Vryzas
—	FW	PER	Paul Cominges
—	FW	YUG	Slobodan Krčmarević
—	FW	COL	Adolfo Valencia
—	FW	GRE	Kostas Kyriakidis

== Transfers ==
Players transferred in

Transfer window	Pos.	Name	Club	Fee
Summer	DF	(Federal Republic of Yugoslavia) Božidar Bandović	(Greece) Olympiacos	Free
Summer	DF	(Italy) Mirko Taccola	(Italy) Lucchese	Free
Summer	DF	(Greece) Anastasios Katsabis	(Greece) Panionios	?
Summer	DF	(Greece) Vasilios Samaras	(Greece) Panachaiki	?
Summer	MF	(Greece) Pantelis Konstantinidis	(Greece) Apollon Athens	300 million Dr.
Summer	MF	(Greece) Triantafyllos Macheridis	(Greece) AEK Athens	Exchange
Summer	MF	(Greece) Kostas Lagonidis	(Greece) Apollon Kalamarias	Free
Summer	MF	(Austria) Dietmar Berchtold	(Germany) Waldhof Mannheim	Free
Summer	MF	(Uzbekistan) Abdukahhor Marifaliev	(Uzbekistan) MHSK Tashkent	Free
Summer	FW	(Greece) Kostas Kyriakidis	(Greece) Doxa Drama	60 million Dr.
Winter	FW	(Federal Republic of Yugoslavia) Slobodan Krčmarević	(Cyprus) Anorthosis Famagusta	130 million Dr.
Winter	FW	(Colombia) Adolfo Valencia	(Colombia) Independiente Medellín	Free

Players transferred out

Transfer window	Pos.	Name	Club	Fee
Summer	DF	(Greece) Panagiotis Sidiropoulos		Retired
Summer	DF	(Greece) Tasos Tasiopoulos	(Greece) Paniliakos	Free
Summer	DF	(Australia) Joe Palatsides	(Greece) Olympiacos Volos	Free
Summer	MF	(Greece) Spyros Marangos	(Cyprus) Omonia	Loan
Summer	FW	(Greece) Paraschos Zouboulis	(Greece) AEK Athens	Exchange
Summer	FW	(Hungary) Zoltán Kovács	(Hungary) Újpest	End of loan
Winter	GK	(Greece) Asterios Themelis	(Greece) Proodeftiki	Free
Winter	MF	(Austria) Dietmar Berchtold	(Greece) Apollon Athens	Free
Winter	MF	(Uzbekistan) Abdukahhor Marifaliev	(Uzbekistan) Dustlik	Free

== Pre-season ==
Win Draw Loss

17 July 1998 Friendly	Fenerbahçe	0–0	PAOK	Germany

18 July 1998 Friendly	Bayer Leverkusen	1–1	PAOK	Austria
	Beinlich 12'		Vryzas 42'
Note: Game length was 45 minutes

18 July 1998 Friendly	Croatia Zagreb	4–4	PAOK	Austria
	3'; Jeličić 21', 40' (pen.); 33'		Katsabis 5'; Konstantinidis 8'; Cominges 13', 16'
Note: Game length was 45 minutes

19 July 1998 Friendly	Galatasaray	0–2	PAOK	Germany
			Frantzeskos 19'; Toursounidis 49'

21 July 1998 Friendly	Wenderhol	1–2	PAOK	Germany
			Kapetanopoulos; Olivares

27 July 1998 Friendly	Veria	0–3	PAOK	Veria
			Vryzas 6'; Frantzeskos 38'; Cominges 85'	Stadium: Veria Stadium; Referee: Nikou

30 July 1998 Friendly	PAOK	1–0	AEK Athens	Thessaloniki
	Katsabis 19'			Stadium: Toumba Stadium

3 August 1998 Friendly	Olympiacos	3–0	PAOK	Athens
	Giannakopoulos 29'; Ofori-Quaye 55'; Samaras 68' (o.g.)			Stadium: Athens Olympic Stadium; Attendance: 7,928; Referee: Papapetrou

== Competitions ==
=== Overview ===
Competition	Record							
Competition	Pld	W	D	L	GF	GA	GD	Win %
Alpha Ethniki	34	19	5	10	52	31	+21	55.88
Greek Cup	3	2	0	1	8	2	+6	66.67
UEFA Cup	2	0	1	1	0	2	−2	0.00
Total	39	21	6	12	60	35	+25	53.85

Source: Competitions

=== Managerial statistics ===
Head coach	From	To	Record							
Head coach	From	To	G	W	D	L	GF	GA	GD	Win %
(Ukraine) Oleg Blokhin	Start of season	29.08.1998	4	0	1	3	1	7	−6	0.00
(Greece) Angelos Anastasiadis	13.09.1998	07.02.1999	19	13	3	3	34	14	+20	68.42
(Netherlands) Arie Haan	15.02.1999	End of season	16	8	2	6	25	14	+11	50.00

== Alpha Ethniki ==
=== Standings ===
Pos	Team	Pld	W	D	L	GF	GA	GD	Pts	Qualification or relegation
2	AEK Athens	34	23	6	5	71	27	+44	75	Qualification for Champions League third qualifying round
3	Panathinaikos	34	23	5	6	66	36	+30	74	Qualification for UEFA Cup first round
4	PAOK	34	19	5	10	52	31	+21	62	Qualification for UEFA Cup first round
5	Ionikos	34	17	9	8	64	36	+28	60 (Note: Head-to-head record: Aris–Ionikos 1–1, Ionikos–Aris 3–0.)	Qualification for UEFA Cup first round
6	Aris	34	19	3	12	53	43	+10	60	Qualification for UEFA Cup first round

Source: Galanis Sports Data
Rules for classification: 1st points; 2nd head-to-head points; 3rd head-to-head goal difference; 4th decision match.

==== Results summary ====
Overall								Home						Away					
Pld	W	D	L	GF	GA	GD	Pts	W	D	L	GF	GA	GD	W	D	L	GF	GA	GD
34	19	5	10	52	31	+21	62	12	3	2	31	12	+19	7	2	8	21	19	+2

Last updated: 30 May 1999.
Source: Competitive matches

==== Results by round ====
Round	1	2	3	4	5	6	7	8	9	10	11	12	13	14	15	16	17	18	19	20	21	22	23	24	25	26	27	28	29	30	31	32	33	34
Ground	A	H	A	H	A	H	A	H	H	A	H	A	H	A	H	A	A	H	A	H	A	H	A	H	A	A	H	A	H	A	H	A	H	H
Result	L	L	D	W	D	W	W	L	W	W	W	W	W	W	W	L	W	D	L	W	W	D	L	D	L	L	W	W	W	L	W	L	W	W
Position	13	15	15	14	13	10	9	9	7	5	5	5	3	3	3	4	4	4	5	4	4	4	4	4	4	4	4	4	4	4	4	6	6	4

Source: League matches
A = Away; H = Home; W = Win; D = Draw; L = Loss

==== Matches ====
Win Draw Loss

22 August 1998 1	Ionikos	1–0	PAOK	Piraeus
	Udebuluzor 87'			Stadium: Karaiskakis Stadium

29 August 1998 2	PAOK	1–4	Aris	Thessaloniki
	Kafes 63'		Charisteas 15', 54'; Koulakiotis 68' (o.g.); Panopoulos 73'	Stadium: Toumba Stadium; Attendance: 22,798; Referee: Fasolis

13 September 1998 3	Kavala	1–1	PAOK	Kavala
	Pisz 2'		Kafes 60'	Stadium: Anthi Karagianni Stadium; Attendance: 5,135; Referee: Ampelakias

20 September 1998 4	PAOK	2–0	Panathinaikos	Thessaloniki
	Katsabis 18'; Frantzeskos 79'; Argyriou (red card) 85'		Goumas (red card) 89'	Stadium: Toumba Stadium; Attendance: 12,996; Referee: Bikas

27 September 1998 5	Ethnikos Piraeus	1–1	PAOK	Piraeus
	Anastasakis 52'		Velis (red card) 9'; Cominges 74'	Stadium: Karaiskakis Stadium; Attendance: 1,436; Referee: Kaznaferis

4 October 1998 6	PAOK	2–1	Iraklis	Thessaloniki
	Frantzeskos 22'; Kafes 90+4'		Kyriazis (red card) 66'; Stoltidis 85' (pen.)	Stadium: Toumba Stadium; Attendance: 11,542; Referee: Psychomanis

25 October 1998 7	Xanthi	0–1	PAOK	Xanthi
			Vryzas 20'	Stadium: Xanthi Ground; Attendance: 5,722; Referee: Giannadakis

31 October 1998 8	PAOK	1–2	Olympiacos	Thessaloniki
	Frantzeskos 72'		Ofori-Quaye 7'; Georgatos 81' (pen.)	Stadium: Toumba Stadium; Attendance: 25,858; Referee: Papapetrou
Note: Match suspended at 83rd minute when a goal scored by Taccola was disallowed. Remained as final result. PAOK were sentenced with a 3 home games stadium ban by court decision.

7 November 1998 9	PAOK	2–1	AEK Athens	Thessaloniki
	Olivares 62' (pen.), 74'		Nikolaidis 40'; Markos (red card) 62'	Stadium: Toumba Stadium; Attendance: 13,535; Referee: Bikas

22 November 1998 10	Apollon Athens	1–4	PAOK	Athens
	Papadimitriou 2'		Taccola 15'; Toursounidis 59'; Katsabis 81'; Cominges 85'	Stadium: Nea Smyrni Stadium; Attendance: 719; Referee: Douros

29 November 1998 11	PAOK	3–1	Panelefsiniakos	Thessaloniki
	Konstantinidis 4'; Taccola 61', 80'		Kaklamanos 51'	Stadium: Toumba Stadium; Attendance: 4,941; Referee: Briakos

5 December 1998 12	Veria	1–2	PAOK	Veria
	Thomaidis 58'		Bandović 44', 56'	Stadium: Veria Stadium; Attendance: 3,124; Referee: Bikas

13 December 1998 13	PAOK	3–1	OFI	Larissa
	Katsabis 10'; Konstantinidis 60'; Taccola 69'		Papadopoulos 77' (pen.)	Stadium: Alcazar Stadium; Attendance: 3,980; Referee: Borovilos
Note: Game held at Larissa because PAOK had a stadium ban.

20 December 1998 14	Paniliakos	1–2	PAOK	Pyrgos
	Sapanis 61'		Bandović 8'; Taccola 45'	Stadium: Pyrgos Stadium; Attendance: 2,579; Referee: Koutsogiannis

17 January 1999 15	PAOK	1–0	Proodeftiki	Karditsa
	Nagbe 14'			Stadium: Municipal Stadium of Karditsa; Referee: Aronis
Note: Game held at Karditsa because PAOK had a stadium ban.

24 January 1999 16	Ethnikos Asteras	1–0	PAOK	Athens
	Kogioglou 73'			Stadium: Kaisariani Stadium; Attendance: 3,050; Referee: Kalyvas

30 January 1999 17	Panionios	0–1	PAOK	Athens
			Krčmarević 26'; Olivares (penalty missed) 58'	Stadium: Nea Smyrni Stadium; Referee: Chelis

7 February 1999 18	PAOK	0–0	Ionikos	Thessaloniki
				Stadium: Toumba Stadium; Attendance: 15,518; Referee: Fasolis

15 February 1999 19	Aris	2–0	PAOK	Thessaloniki
	G.S. Georgiadis 22' (pen.); Nagoli 56'			Stadium: Kleanthis Vikelidis Stadium; Attendance: 17,146; Referee: Koutsogiannis

21 February 1999 20	PAOK	1–0	Kavala	Thessaloniki
	Bandović 90'			Stadium: Toumba Stadium; Attendance: 6,132

28 February 1999 21	Panathinaikos	0–1	PAOK	Athens
			Frantzeskos 38'	Stadium: Athens Olympic Stadium; Attendance: 21,237; Referee: Bikas

7 March 1999 22	PAOK	0–0	Ethnikos Piraeus	Thessaloniki
				Stadium: Toumba Stadium; Attendance: 16,386; Referee: Kaznaferis

14 March 1999 23	Iraklis	1–0	PAOK	Thessaloniki
	Semos 52'			Stadium: Kaftanzoglio Stadium; Attendance: 17,967; Referee: Mintiouris

21 March 1999 24	PAOK	0–0	Xanthi	Thessaloniki
	Macheridis (red card) 78'			Stadium: Toumba Stadium; Attendance: 4,124; Referee: Psychomanis

4 April 1999 25	Olympiacos	2–1	PAOK	Athens
	Đorđević 3'; Georgatos 90+1' (pen.)		Vryzas 5'; Koulakiotis (red card) 71'	Stadium: Athens Olympic Stadium; Attendance: 16,582; Referee: Vallianos

18 April 1999 26	AEK Athens	2–0	PAOK	Athens
	Nikolaidis 45' (pen.); Wreh 78'			Stadium: Nikos Goumas Stadium; Attendance: 14,139; Referee: Bikas

25 April 1999 27	PAOK	3–1	Apollon Athens	Thessaloniki
	Valencia 7'; Krčmarević 74'; Konstantinidis 85'		Labriakos 45'	Stadium: Toumba Stadium; Attendance: 5,079; Referee: Papilias

1 May 1999 28	Panelefsiniakos	0–4	PAOK	Eleusis
	Tsironis (red card) 76'		Frantzeskos 24', 57'; Krčmarević 76' (pen.); Toursounidis 85'	Stadium: Municipal Stadium of Elefsina; Attendance: 1,065; Referee: Kalyvas

9 May 1999 29	PAOK	2–0	Veria	Thessaloniki
	Kafes 11', 87'			Stadium: Toumba Stadium; Attendance: 6,543; Referee: Chronopoulos

12 May 1999 30	OFI	3–2	PAOK	Heraklion
	Koutsoupias 40'; Iordanidis 51'; Kotsios 90+4'		Vryzas 14'; Krčmarević (penalty missed) 55'; Konstantinidis 88'	Stadium: Theodoros Vardinogiannis Stadium; Attendance: 2,507; Referee: Konstantinidis

16 May 1999 31	PAOK	2–0	Paniliakos	Thessaloniki
	Frantzeskos 58'; Bandović 68'; Olivares (penalty missed) 88'			Stadium: Toumba Stadium; Attendance: 4,847; Referee: Giannadakis

19 May 1999 32	Proodeftiki	2–1	PAOK	Piraeus
	Dimos 4'; Giannopoulos 81'		Valencia 84'	Stadium: Nikaia Municipal Stadium; Attendance: 727

23 May 1999 33	PAOK	5–1	Ethnikos Asteras	Thessaloniki
	Tsalikis 8' (o.g.); Frantzeskos 45'; Kafes 47'; Katsabis 61'; Bandović 75' (pen.); Krčmarević (red card) 87'		Basinas 88'; Samaras (red card) 89'	Stadium: Toumba Stadium; Attendance: 3,158; Referee: Bikas

30 May 1999 34	PAOK	3–0	Panionios	Thessaloniki
	Vryzas 28'; Valencia 30'; Kafes 34'			Stadium: Toumba Stadium; Attendance: 3,752

== Greek Cup ==
=== First round ===
11 November 1998	Aetos Skydra	0–5	PAOK	Skydra
13:00 EET		Report (page 26)	Cominges 3', 45'; Kyriakidis 21', 70'; Koulakiotis 88'	Stadium: Skydra Municipal Ground

=== Second round ===
16 December 1998	Panegialios	1–3 (a.e.t.)	PAOK	Aigio
13:00 EET	Spanos 38'	Report (page 32)	Cominges 11', 100'; Kafes 113'	Stadium: Aigio National Stadium; Attendance: 2,986; Referee: Giorgos Kasnaferis (Athens)

=== Round of 16 ===
13 January 1999	PAOK	0–1	Panserraikos	Kavala
18:00 EET		Report (pages 34-35)	Ipirotis 84'	Stadium: Kavala National Stadium; Attendance: 1,866; Referee: Giannis Abelakias (Thessaly)
Note: Game held at Kavala because PAOK had a stadium ban.

== UEFA Cup ==
=== Second qualifying round ===
11 August 1998 1st leg	Rangers (Scotland)	2–0	(Greece) PAOK	Glasgow, Scotland
19:45	Kanchelskis 55'; Wallace 68'	Report	Macheridis (red card) 7'	Stadium: Ibrox Stadium; Attendance: 35,392; Referee: Kim Milton Nielsen (Denmark)

25 August 1998 2nd leg	PAOK (Greece)	0–0 (0–2 agg.)	(Scotland) Rangers	Thessaloniki, Greece
21:15		Report		Stadium: Toumba Stadium; Attendance: 30,388; Referee: Markus Merk (Germany)

== Statistics ==
=== Squad statistics ===
As of May 30, 1999

Appearances denote players in the starting lineup, with the numbers in parentheses denoting appearances as substitute.

No.	Name	Alpha Ethniki		Greek Cup		UEFA Cup		Total	
No.	Name	Apps	Goals	Apps	Goals	Apps	Goals	Apps	Goals
Goalkeepers
	(Greece) Nikolaos Michopoulos	19	0	2	0	2	0	23	0
	(Greece) Nikolaos Argyriou	17	0	1	0	0	0	18	0
Defenders
	(Greece) Anastasios Katsabis	31	4	3	0	2	0	36	4
	(Federal Republic of Yugoslavia) Božidar Bandović	28	6	2	0	2	0	32	6
	(Peru) Percy Olivares	27	2	1	0	2	0	30	2
	(Greece) Dimitrios Kapetanopoulos	24	0	1	0	2	0	27	0
	(Italy) Mirko Taccola	18	5	1	0	0	0	19	5
	(Greece) Georgios Koulakiotis	14	0	2	1	1	0	17	1
	(Greece) Vasilios Samaras	6	0	2	0	0	0	8	0
	(Greece) Vangelis Nastos	5	0	1	0	0	0	6	0
	(Greece) Nikos Kolompourdas	2	0	0	0	0	0	2	0
Midfielders
	(Greece) Kostas Frantzeskos	30	8	1	0	2	0	33	8
	(Greece) Achilleas Zafiriou	27	0	3	0	2	0	32	0
	(Greece) Pantelis Kafes	27	7	2	1	1	0	30	8
	(Greece) Pantelis Konstantinidis	26	4	3	0	1	0	30	4
	(Liberia) Joe Nagbe	26	1	1	0	2	0	29	1
	(Greece) Giorgos Toursounidis	22	2	2	0	2	0	26	2
	(Greece) Triantafyllos Macheridis	22	0	1	0	1	0	24	0
	(Greece) Christos Velis	21	0	2	0	0	0	23	0
	(Greece) Kostas Lagonidis	1	0	2	0	0	0	3	0
	(Austria) Dietmar Berchtold	1	0	2	0	0	0	3	0
	(Uzbekistan) Abdukahhor Marifaliev	1	0	0	0	1	0	2	0
Forwards
	(Greece) Zisis Vryzas	33	4	2	0	2	0	37	4
	(Peru) Paul Cominges	13	2	2	4	2	0	17	6
	(Federal Republic of Yugoslavia) Slobodan Krčmarević	15	3	0	0	0	0	15	3
	(Colombia) Adolfo Valencia	13	3	0	0	0	0	13	3
	(Greece) Kostas Kyriakidis	6	0	3	2	0	0	9	2

Source: Match reports in competitive matches, RSSSF

=== Goalscorers ===
Rank	No.	Pos.	Player	Alpha Ethniki	Greek Cup	UEFA Cup	Total
1		MF	(Greece) Kostas Frantzeskos	8	0	0	8
1		MF	(Greece) Pantelis Kafes	7	1	0	8
3		DF	(Federal Republic of Yugoslavia) Božidar Bandović	6	0	0	6
3		FW	(Peru) Paul Cominges	2	4	0	6
5		DF	(Italy) Mirko Taccola	5	0	0	5
6		DF	(Greece) Anastasios Katsabis	4	0	0	4
6		MF	(Greece) Pantelis Konstantinidis	4	0	0	4
6		FW	(Greece) Zisis Vryzas	4	0	0	4
9		FW	(Federal Republic of Yugoslavia) Slobodan Krčmarević	3	0	0	3
9		FW	(Colombia) Adolfo Valencia	3	0	0	3
11		DF	(Peru) Percy Olivares	2	0	0	2
11		MF	(Greece) Giorgos Toursounidis	2	0	0	2
11		FW	(Greece) Kostas Kyriakidis	0	2	0	2
14		MF	(Liberia) Joe Nagbe	1	0	0	1
14		DF	(Greece) Georgios Koulakiotis	0	1	0	1
Own goals				1	0	0	1
TOTALS				52	8	0	60

Source: Match reports in competitive matches, RSSSF
