= Juan Cominges =

Peruvian footballer (born 1983)

Personal information
- Full name: Juan Elías Cominges Mayorga
- Date of birth: 1 October 1983 (age 43)
- Place of birth: Callao, Peru
- Height: 1.87 m (6 ft 2 in)
- Position: Attacking midfielder

Youth career
- Universitario

Senior career*
Years	Team	Apps	(Gls)
2000–2001	Virgen de Chapi	48	(6)
2002	Coronel Bolognesi	31	(1)
2003	Universitario	33	(3)
2004	Sporting Cristal	35	(6)
2005	Colón de Santa Fe	27	(3)
2006	Estudiantes	22	(2)
2007	Sporting Cristal	21	(0)
2008	Caracas	6	(0)
2008	Atlético Huila	9	(2)
2009	José Gálvez	12	(1)
2009	Al-Qadisiya	17	(8)
2010	José Gálvez	14	(2)
2011	Al-Qadisiya	10	(1)
2011	Cobresol	8	(0)
2012	Cienciano	35	(3)
2013	Guarani	0	(0)
2013	Unión Comercio	17	(1)
2014–2016	Sport Boys	38	(19)
2017	Cienciano	28	(3)
2017	Sport Victoria	4	(1)

International career
2003–2012	Peru	15	(0)
2018–	Peru (beach)		
- * Club domestic league appearances and goals

Juan Elías Cominges Mayorga (born 1 October 1983) is a Peruvian former professional footballer who played as an attacking midfielder. Cominges has risen to fame in the South American scene over the recent years. This right-footed midfielder first attracted attention due to being the younger brother of forward Paul Cominges, who had been an effective striker in the major clubs in Peru and at a few clubs overseas.

== Club career ==
Cominges got his chance in the youth divisions of popular club Universitario de Deportes and slowly earned a spot in the main team as well as in the national youth teams of Peru. To give him a chance to play more games he was loaned to the club Coronel Bolognesi of Tacna in 2002, where he performed well. He then returned to the 'U' in 2003, where he had another good year. Due to money arguments the next year he moved to rival team Sporting Cristal, where he performed so well, scoring several goals and leading the team to a national championship, that he was named the Peruvian player of the year by the media outlets.

In 2005 former 'U' star José "Chemo" del Solar, on his first outing as a coach, took Juan to Argentine club Colón de Santa Fe. Juan had several ups and downs in his performance, but secured a starting place as the new '10' of the Peru national team. The next year he migrated to Estudiantes de La Plata. He played a few games of the Copa Libertadores before developing a back injury, which kept him off the fields until July 2006. From there on he played irregularly, but he remained part of the championship-winning team. He has recently moved back to Sporting Cristal, where he played in the 2007 Torneo Descentralizado season.

In January 2008, he was signed by Venezuelan club Caracas FC, making his debut against Union Lara.

== Honours ==
Sporting Cristal

- Torneo Clausura: 2004

Estudiantes de La Plata

- Apertura: 2006

Peru U18

- Bolivarian Games: 2001
