= Vidak Bratić =

Serbian footballer

Personal information
- Date of birth: 20 October 1976 (age 50)
- Place of birth: Subotica, SR Serbia, SFR Yugoslavia
- Height: 1.90 m (6 ft 3 in)
- Position: Centre-back

Youth career
- Solunac Karađorđevo

Senior career*
Years	Team	Apps	(Gls)
1996–1999	Vojvodina	66	(5)
2000–2001	PAOK	25	(2)
2001–2003	Red Star Belgrade	32	(1)
2003–2004	Dynamo Moscow	12	(0)
2006–2007	OFK Beograd	13	(0)
2007	Tianjin Teda	11	(0)
2008	St. Gallen	4	(1)
2008	Wil	1	(0)
2009	OFK Beograd	15	(0)
2009–2013	Spartak Subotica	104	(8)
Total		283	(17)

Managerial career
- 2013–2014: Spartak Subotica (assistant)
- 2014–2015: Red Star Belgrade (assistant)
- 2015–2016: Vojvodina (assistant)
- 2016–2018: FK Čukarički (assistant)
- 2018–2019: Radnički Niš (assistant)
- 2019–2021: Vojvodina (assistant)
- 2022: Radnički 1923 (assistant)
- 2022: Borac Banja Luka (assistant)
- 2022: Radnički Niš (assistant)
- 2023: Mladost Novi Sad (assistant)
- 2023–2024: Novi Sad 1921
- 2024: Radnički Sremska Mitrovica
- * Club domestic league appearances and goals

Vidak Bratić (Serbian Cyrillic: Видак Братић; born 20 October 1976) is a Serbian professional football coach and a former player who played as a defender. He is an assistant coach with Radnički Niš. He lastly spent four seasons with Spartak Subotica, before retiring in the summer of 2013. Previously, Bratić represented numerous clubs in his country and abroad, most notably Vojvodina and PAOK.

== Statistics ==
Club	Season	League	
Club	Season	Apps	Goals
Vojvodina	1996–97	11	1
Vojvodina	1997–98	28	1
Vojvodina	1998–99	17	1
Vojvodina	1999–2000	10	2
PAOK	1999–2000	11	2
PAOK	2000–01	14	0
Red Star Belgrade	2001–02	16	1
Red Star Belgrade	2002–03	16	0
Dynamo Moscow	2003	6	0
Dynamo Moscow	2004	6	0
OFK Beograd	2006–07	13	0
Tianjin Teda	2007	11	0
St. Gallen	2007–08	4	1
Wil	2008–09	1	0
OFK Beograd	2008–09	15	0
Spartak Subotica	2009–10	24	1
Spartak Subotica	2010–11	28	2
Spartak Subotica	2011–12	26	3
Spartak Subotica	2012–13	26	2
Career total		283	17

== Honours ==
Red Star Belgrade

- FR Yugoslavia Cup: 2001–02
