= Dietmar Berchtold =

Austrian footballer

Personal information
- Full name: Dietmar Berchtold
- Date of birth: 6 August 1974 (age 52)
- Place of birth: Bludenz, Austria
- Height: 1.76 m (5 ft 9 1/2 in)
- Position: Midfielder

Team information
- Current team: FC Rätia Bludenz

Youth career
- 1982–1988: FC Rätia Bludenz
- 1988–1993: FC Dornbirn

Senior career*
Years	Team	Apps	(Gls)
1993–1994	Wiener Sport-Club	11	(0)
1994–1996	SK Vorwärts Steyr	56	(4)
1996–1997	LASK Linz	4	(0)
1997–1998	SV Waldhof Mannheim	30	(4)
1998	PAOK	1	(0)
1998–1999	Apollon Smyrnis	15	(3)
1999–2001	Alemannia Aachen	46	(6)
2001–2002	VfL Bochum	9	(0)
2003–2004	SW Bregenz	39	(9)
2004–2006	SV Ried	62	(6)
2006	SC Austria Lustenau	17	(5)
2006–2007	FC Farul Constanţa	0	(0)
2007	Grazer AK	11	(2)
2007–2010	SV Grödig	86	(15)
2010–	FC Rätia Bludenz	13	(1)

Managerial career
- 2010–: FC Rätia Bludenz
- * Club domestic league appearances and goals

Dietmar Berchtold (born 6 August 1974) is an Austrian football midfielder.
