= Paraskevas Paiteris =

Greek footballer

Personal information
- Date of birth: 30 June 1970 (age 56)
- Position: Defender

Senior career*
Years	Team	Apps	(Gls)
1991–1996	Charavgiakos		
1996	Kastoria		
1997–1998	Panionios		
1998–1999	Kallithea		
1999–2001	Leonidio		
2001–2003	Ethnikos Piraeus		
2003–2006	Koropi		
2006–2007	Achilleas Kato Acharnon		
- * Club domestic league appearances and goals

Paraskevas Paiteris (Greek: Παρασκευάς Παϊτέρης; born 30 June 1970) is a Greek former football defender.
