= Abdukahhor Marifaliev =

Uzbekistani footballer (born 1971)

Abdikokhor Marifaliev
Personal information
- Date of birth: 1 May 1971 (age 55)
- Height: 1.76 m (5 ft 9 in)
- Positions: Midfielder; forward

Senior career*
Years	Team	Apps	(Gls)
1988–1990	Sokhibkor Khalkabad		
1991–1995	Pakhtakor Tashkent	124	(15)
1996–1997	Navbahor Namangan		
1997–1998	MHSK Toshkent		
1998	PAOK	1	(0)
1998–2001	Do'stlik		
2002–2003	Esil Bogatyr		
2004–2005	Lokomotiv Tashkent		

International career
1992–2001	Uzbekistan	32	(5)

Managerial career
- 2008: Metallurg Bekabad
- * Club domestic league appearances and goals

Abdikokhor Marifaliev (Russian: Абдукаххор Марифалиев; born 1 May 1971) is an Uzbekistani former professional football player and manager. He made 32 appearances for the Uzbekistan national team, scoring five goals.

== Career ==
Marifaliev began playing football for Sokhibkor Khalkabad in the Soviet Second League. In 1991, he joined Soviet Top League side Pakhtakor Tashkent. After the fall of the Soviet Union, Marifaliev would spend most of his career playing in the Uzbek League, winning five championships (with Pakhtakor Tashkent in 1992, with Navbahor Namangan 1996, with MHSK in 1997 and with Do'stlik in 1999 and 2000).

He moved to Greece in 1998, but played only one Super League match for PAOK before returning to Uzbekistan.

Marifaliev made 32 appearances and scored 5 goals for the senior Uzbekistan national team between 1992 and 2001.

Following his playing career, Marifaliev became a football manager, leading Metallurg Bekabad during the 2008 Uzbek League season.
