= Andrew Rabutla =

South African soccer player

Personal information
- Date of birth: 21 November 1971 (age 54)
- Place of birth: Tzaneen, South Africa
- Height: 1.75 m (5 ft 9 in)
- Position: Defender

Senior career*
Years	Team	Apps	(Gls)
1991–1993	D'Alberton Callies		
1995–1996	Rabali Blackpool	36	(0)
1996–1997	Jomo Cosmos	38	(2)
1997–1998	PAOK	0	(0)
1998–2006	Jomo Cosmos	229	(?)

International career
1997–2001	South Africa	19	(1)
- * Club domestic league appearances and goals

Andrew Rabutla (born 21 November 1971) is a South African former soccer player who played at both professional and international levels as a defender.

He was nicknamed "Jaws of Life" because of his tough tackling.

== Career ==
Rabutla played his club football in South Africa and Greece for D'Alberton Callies, Rabali Blackpool, Jomo Cosmos and PAOK. His European career end early after a serious knee injury. With PAOK, Rabutla only played one official game, in the 1997–98 UEFA Cup. Due to his injury his released from PAOK at the middle of the season.

He also earned nineteen caps for the South African national side between 1997 and 2001, scoring one goal. Two of his caps came in FIFA World Cup qualifying matches. He also took part at the 1998 African Cup of Nations final.
