= Christian Dollberg =

Argentine former footballer

Personal information
- Full name: Christian Juan Dollberg
- Date of birth: 3 November 1971 (age 55)
- Place of birth: Buenos Aires, Argentina
- Height: 1.97 m (6 ft 6 in)
- Position: Defender

Senior career*
Years	Team	Apps	(Gls)
1992–1994	Argentinos Juniors	70	(8)
1995	Lanús	14	(2)
1995–1996	1. FC Köln	11	(0)
1996–1999	Boca Juniors	13	(0)
2000–2001	PAOK	7	(2)
2001	Defensores de Belgrano	3	(0)
- * Club domestic league appearances and goals

Christian Dollberg (born 3 November 1971) is a former Argentinian footballer who played as a defender.

Dollberg started his playing career in 1992 with Argentinos Juniors. He has also played for Lanús, Boca Juniors and Defensores de Belgrano in Argentina.

Dollberg also played in Europe for 1. FC Köln of Germany and PAOK of Greece.

WIth a total of 27 appearances and 3 career goals in 2001, aged less than 30 years, Dollberg retired from football.
