= Spyros Nousias =

Greek footballer

Personal information
- Date of birth: 5 January 1973 (age 53)
- Place of birth: Kozani, Greece
- Height: 1.87 m (6 ft 2 in)
- Position: Midfielder

Senior career*
Years	Team	Apps	(Gls)
1992–1996	Naoussa		
1997–2001	Paniliakos		
2002	Aris		
- * Club domestic league appearances and goals

Spyros Nousias (Greek: Σπύρος Νούσιας; born 5 January 1973) is a retired Greek football midfielder.
