= Isaak Almanidis =

Greek footballer

Personal information
- Date of birth: 5 January 1971 (age 55)
- Place of birth: Athens, Greece
- Height: 1.74 m (5 ft 9 in)

Senior career*
Years	Team	Apps	(Gls)
–1999	Proodeftiki		
1999–2001	Paniliakos		
2001–2003	Proodeftiki		
2003–2004	Aias Salamina		
- * Club domestic league appearances and goals

Isaak Almanidis (Greek: Ισαάκ Αλμανίδης; born 5 January 1971) is a retired Greek football striker.
