= 1999–2000 Alpha Ethniki =

64th season of top-tier football league in Greece

Alpha Ethniki
- Season: 1999–2000
- Champions: Olympiacos; 29th Greek title
- Relegated: Kavala; Proodeftiki; Apollon Athens; Trikala
- Champions League: Olympiacos; Panathinaikos
- UEFA Cup: AEK Athens; OFI; PAOK; Iraklis
- Intertoto Cup: Kalamata
- Matches: 306
- Goals: 885 (2.89 per match)
- Top goalscorer: Dimitris Nalitzis (24 goals)

The 1999–2000 Alpha Ethniki was the 64th season of the highest football league of Greece. The season began on 19 September 1999 and ended on 28 May 2000. Olympiacos won their fourth consecutive and 29th Greek title.

== Teams ==
Promoted from 1998–99 Beta Ethniki	Relegated from 1998–99 Alpha Ethniki
Trikala; Panachaiki; Kalamata	Panelefsiniakos; Veria; Ethnikos Piraeus

=== Stadiums and personnel ===
Location of teams in 1999–2000 Alpha Ethniki

Team	Manager^{1}	Location	Stadium	Capacity
AEK Athens	(Greece) Giannis Pathiakakis	Athens (Nea Filadelfeia)	Nikos Goumas Stadium	27,729
Apollon Athens	(Greece) Andreas Michalopoulos	Athens (Rizoupoli)	Rizoupoli Stadium	14,856
Aris	(Greece) Giannis Michalitsios	Thessaloniki (Charilaou)	Kleanthis Vikelidis Stadium	23,220
Ethnikos Asteras	(Greece) Spyros Livathinos	Athens (Kaisariani)	Michalis Kritikopoulos Stadium	4,851
Ionikos	(Ukraine) Oleg Blokhin	Piraeus (Nikaia)	Neapoli Stadium	4,999
Iraklis	(Greece) Angelos Anastasiadis	Thessaloniki (Triandria)	Kaftanzoglio Stadium	27,770
Kalamata	(Greece) Vasilis Georgopoulos	Kalamata	Kalamata Municipal Stadium	5,613
Kavala	(Greece) Georgios Paraschos	Kavala	Kavala National Stadium	12,500
OFI	(Netherlands) Eugène Gerards	Heraklion	Theodoros Vardinogiannis Stadium	9,000
Olympiacos	(Greece) Giannis Matzourakis	Athens (Marousi)	Athens Olympic Stadium	69,638
Panachaiki	(Greece) Christos Archontidis	Patras	Kostas Davourlis Stadium	11,321
Panathinaikos	(Greece) Ioannis Kyrastas	Athens (Marousi)	Athens Olympic Stadium	69,638
Paniliakos	(Netherlands) Arie Haan	Pyrgos	Pyrgos Stadium	6,750
Panionios	(Greece) Christos Emvoliadis	Athens (Nea Smyrni)	Nea Smyrni Stadium	11,756
PAOK	(Bosnia and Herzegovina) Dušan Bajević	Thessaloniki (Toumba)	Toumba Stadium	28,703
Proodeftiki	(Greece) Soulis Papadopoulos	Piraeus (Nikaia)	Nikaia Municipal Stadium	5,000
Skoda Xanthi	(Greece) Nikos Karageorgiou	Xanthi	Xanthi Ground	9,500
Trikala	(Federal Republic of Yugoslavia) Zoran Babović	Trikala	Trikala Municipal Stadium	15,000

- ^{1} On final match day of the season, played on 28 May 2000.

== League table ==
Pos	Team	Pld	W	D	L	GF	GA	GD	Pts	Qualification or relegation
1	Olympiacos (C)	34	30	2	2	86	18	+68	92	Qualification for Champions League first group stage
2	Panathinaikos	34	28	4	2	92	24	+68	88	Qualification for Champions League third qualifying round
3	AEK Athens	34	20	6	8	69	39	+30	66	Qualification for UEFA Cup first round
4	OFI	34	18	9	7	60	44	+16	63	Qualification for UEFA Cup first round
5	PAOK	34	15	10	9	64	44	+20	55	Qualification for UEFA Cup first round
6	Iraklis	34	15	5	14	58	58	0	50 (Note: Head-to-head points (goal difference): Iraklis 3 (+1), Aris 3 (-1).)	Qualification for UEFA Cup Play-offs
7	Aris	34	14	8	12	50	46	+4	50	Qualification for UEFA Cup Play-offs
8	Panionios	34	14	3	17	50	63	−13	45	Qualification for UEFA Cup Play-offs
9	Kalamata	34	12	8	14	41	57	−16	44	Qualification for Intertoto Cup third round
10	Ionikos	34	10	11	13	40	50	−10	41 (Note: Head-to-head points (goal difference): Ionikos 9 (+4), Xanthi 4 (-1), Ethnikos Asteras 4 (-3).)	
11	Skoda Xanthi	34	11	8	15	36	43	−7	41	
12	Ethnikos Asteras	34	12	5	17	33	50	−17	41	
13	Paniliakos	34	12	4	18	44	48	−4	40	
14	Panachaiki	34	9	12	13	37	47	−10	39	
15	Kavala (R)	34	8	6	20	33	66	−33	30	Relegation to Beta Ethniki
16	Proodeftiki (R)	34	7	7	20	27	55	−28	28	Relegation to Beta Ethniki
17	Apollon Athens (R)	34	6	6	22	30	59	−29	24	Relegation to Beta Ethniki
18	Trikala (R)	34	5	6	23	35	74	−39	21	Relegation to Beta Ethniki

Source: Galanis Sports Data
Rules for classification: 1) Points; 2) Head-to-head points; 3) Head-to-head goal difference; 4) Goal difference; 5) Goals scored; 6) Goals against; 7) Play-offs (neutral ground); 8) Draw.
(Note: Criterion 7 is only used if needed to decide champion, teams for relegation or teams for UEFA competitions).
(C) Champions; (R) Relegated

== Results ==
Home \ Away	AEK	APA	ARIS	ETA	ION	IRA	KAL	KAV	OFI	OLY	PNA	PAO	PNL	PGSS	PAOK	PRO	XAN	TRI
AEK Athens		3–0	2–0	2–1	5–1	3–2	6–1	3–0	1–2	0–2	3–0	1–2	1–0	0–1	2–0	3–2	4–1	2–1
Apollon Athens	3–2		3–3	0–1	0–2	1–0	1–2	0–2	1–2	0–1	0–0	0–3	0–0	2–1	3–4	0–2	0–0	5–2
Aris	1–1	2–1		1–1	1–1	2–1	6–1	1–0	3–1	0–1	2–0	0–2	2–1	5–1	0–0	2–1	0–1	3–3
Ethnikos Asteras	1–3	3–1	1–0		1–2	3–1	2–0	1–0	0–1	1–1	2–2	1–2	3–1	4–2	1–1	1–0	1–0	1–0
Ionikos	1–1	1–0	2–2	3–0		1–1	0–1	2–0	1–1	1–2	0–0	2–2	0–2	2–0	1–0	2–0	2–1	5–1
Iraklis	3–1	1–0	2–0	2–0	3–2		2–1	2–1	0–3	3–4	2–1	1–3	3–1	1–2	3–1	4–0	3–1	4–1
Kalamata	1–1	1–1	5–2	1–0	2–0	2–2		3–2	0–0	0–1	1–1	0–0	2–1	1–3	1–1	2–0	0–0	0–1
Kavala	0–2	1–3	1–0	2–0	0–0	3–1	0–1		0–1	0–5	0–0	1–4	2–1	3–7	1–1	2–1	1–0	4–1
OFI	1–2	1–0	2–1	4–1	2–0	1–1	3–2	2–2		2–1	2–2	3–4	3–2	0–2	2–0	4–3	2–1	2–0
Olympiacos	3–0	2–0	2–0	5–0	2–0	1–0	4–1	5–0	2–0		5–1	2–2	2–1	5–0	4–1	4–0	3–2	3–1
Panachaiki	1–1	1–2	1–2	2–0	1–1	0–1	1–2	3–2	3–1	0–2		1–0	2–0	1–0	1–2	2–0	1–1	3–0
Panathinaikos	1–0	5–0	3–0	4–0	5–0	3–0	5–0	3–0	3–2	2–0	7–1		3–1	2–1	1–1	3–1	2–1	2–0
Paniliakos	0–1	2–1	1–2	2–0	3–0	4–3	3–1	2–0	1–2	0–3	0–0	0–1		3–0	0–4	4–0	2–0	1–3
Panionios	0–2	3–1	1–3	1–0	2–0	2–2	2–0	1–1	1–4	0–1	2–1	0–4	1–2		1–1	2–1	4–0	4–1
PAOK	4–4	1–1	3–2	2–0	3–0	4–0	4–2	5–0	2–2	0–2	1–1	1–3	0–1	2–0		1–0	5–0	2–0
Proodeftiki	1–4	2–0	0–1	1–0	2–2	0–1	1–2	1–1	0–0	0–3	2–2	1–0	1–1	1–0	1–0		0–0	1–0
Skoda Xanthi	2–2	2–0	0–0	0–0	2–1	3–0	1–0	1–0	1–1	0–1	1–0	1–3	1–0	5–0	1–2	2–1		3–0
Trikala	0–1	1–0	0–1	1–2	2–2	3–3	0–2	3–1	1–1	0–2	0–1	1–3	1–1	2–3	3–5	0–0	2–1	

Source: Worldfootball.net
Legend: Blue = home team win; Yellow = draw; Red = away team win.

== UEFA Cup Play-offs ==
AEK Athens were qualified through the Cup, the 3rd league UEFA Cup place was decided between the teams within 5 points from 6th to 8th place.

Pos	Team	Pld	W	D	L	GF	GA	GD	Pts	Qualification	IRA	ARIS	PGSS
1	Iraklis	2	1	1	0	4	2	+2	4	Qualification for UEFA Cup first round		2–0	2–2
2	Aris	2	1	0	1	3	4	−1	3		—		3–2
3	Panionios	2	0	1	1	4	5	−1	1		—	—	

Source: RSSSF
Rules for classification: 1st points; 2nd head-to-head points; 3rd head-to-head goal difference; 4th decision match.

== Top scorers ==
Rank	Player	Club	Goals
1	(Greece) Dimitris Nalitzis	PAOK	24
2	(Greece) Nikos Liberopoulos	Panathinaikos	23
3	(Greece) Demis Nikolaidis	AEK Athens	22
3	(Cyprus) Michalis Konstantinou	Iraklis	22
5	(Costa Rica) Rónald Gómez	OFI	19
6	(Greece) Alexis Alexandris	Olympiacos	15
7	(Serbia and Montenegro) Predrag Đorđević	Olympiacos	12
8	(Greece) Nikos Frousos	PAOK	11
8	(Serbia and Montenegro) Saša Jovanović	Trikala	11
8	(Greece) Paraschos Zouboulis	Skoda Xanthi	11

== Awards ==
=== Annual awards ===
Annual awards were announced on 19 December 2000.

Award	Winner	Club
Greek Player of the Season	(Greece) Nikos Liberopoulos	Panathinaikos
Foreign Player of the Season	(Brazil) Giovanni	Olympiacos
Young Player of the Season	(Greece) Christos Patsatzoglou (Greece) Kostas Katsouranis	Skoda Xanthi; Panachaiki
Goalkeeper of the Season	(Greece) Antonios Nikopolidis	Panathinaikos
Golden Boot	(Greece) Dimitris Nalitzis	PAOK
Manager of the Season	(Greece) Ioannis Kyrastas	Panathinaikos

== Attendances ==
Olympiacos drew the highest average home attendance in the 1999–2000 Alpha Ethniki.

#	Team	Average attendance
1	Olympiacos	14,335
2	Panathinaikos	9,539
3	PAOK	9,352
4	Aris	4,818
5	AEK Athens	4,668
6	Iraklis	4,453
7	OFI	3,699
8	Panachaiki	2,833
9	Kalamata	2,686
10	Panionios	2,378
11	Ethnikos Asteras	2,349
12	Trikala	2,346
13	Paniliakos	1,993
14	Kavala	1,346
15	Skoda Xanthi	1,332
16	Ionikos	1,247
17	Proodeftiki	1,219
18	Apollon Athens	1,044
