= Mirko Taccola =

Italian footballer (born 1970)

Personal information
- Date of birth: 18 April 1970 (age 56)
- Place of birth: Pisa, Italy
- Height: 1.90 m (6 ft 3 in)
- Position: Defender

Senior career*
Years	Team	Apps	(Gls)
1987–1989	Pisa	2	(0)
1989–1990	Ternana	22	(1)
1990–1991	Pescara	15	(1)
1991–1993	Pisa	35	(6)
1993	→ Internazionale (loan)	6	(0)
1993–1994	Lucchese	33	(2)
1994–1995	Palermo	22	(1)
1995–1997	Napoli	7	(0)
1997	→ Cagliari (loan)	4	(0)
1997–1998	Lucchese	16	(0)
1998–2000	PAOK	28	(5)
2000	→ Palermo (loan)	11	(0)
2000–2001	FC Maia	30	(2)
2001–2003	Lanciano	49	(4)
2003–2004	Sora	29	(1)
2004–2006	San Marino	63	(0)
2006–2007	Ternana	24	(1)
2007–2008	San Marino	20	(0)
2008–2009	Paganese	28	(1)
2009	Messina	6	(0)
2010	Potenza	14	(0)
2010–2011	Sapri		
Total		460	(25)
- * Club domestic league appearances and goals

Mirko Taccola (born 18 April 1970 in Pisa, Italy) is an Italian former professional footballer who played as a defender. He represented Italy at the 1992 Summer Olympics.
