= Paul Cominges =

Peruvian footballer (born 1975)

Personal information
- Full name: Paul Manuel Cominges Mayorca
- Date of birth: 24 July 1975 (age 51)
- Place of birth: Lima, Peru
- Position: Striker

Youth career
- Universitario

Senior career*
Years	Team	Apps	(Gls)
1994–1996	Cienciano	67	(23)
1996–1998	PAOK	31	(13)
1999	OFI	9	(0)
1999–2000	Alianza Lima	15	(3)
2000	Cienciano	9	(5)
2000	Águila		
2001	Est. de Medicina	44	(20)
2001–2002	Panachaiki	6	(1)
2002–2003	Universitario	46	(22)
2003–2004	Caracas FC	18	(8)
2004	USMP	26	(10)
2005	Atlético Universidad	47	(19)
2006	Universitario	21	(6)
2007	Coronel Bolognesi	40	(16)
2008	Sporting Cristal	37	(7)
2009	José Gálvez	31	(11)
2010	CNI	8	(1)
2010	José Gálvez	8	(2)
Total		167	(463)

International career
1997–1998	Peru	7	(2)

Managerial career
- 2012: Universitario (assistant)
- 2013: Coronel Bolognesi
- 2014–2015: Sport Boys
- 2016: Cienciano
- 2017: Deportivo Coopsol
- 2020–2021: Universitario (reserves)
- 2021: Unión Huaral
- 2022–2025: Alianza Universidad
- 2025–2026: USMP
- * Club domestic league appearances and goals

Paul Manuel Cominges Mayorca (born 24 July 1975) is a Peruvian football manager and former player who played as a striker.

== Club career ==
Cominges previously played for Coronel Bolognesi, where his nine goals helped guide the club to the Clausura 2007 title. He also played for PAOK and OFI in the Super League Greece.

His last season as a footballer was in the 2010 Descentralizado season with José Gálvez FBC.

== International career ==
Cominges made seven appearances for the Peru national team, including playing at the Copa América 1997.

== Coaching career ==
Cominges won the Peruvian 2nd division championship in 2024 as head coach of Alianza Universidad.

== Personal life ==
Cominges is nicknamed 'Papacito' ('Little Daddy') or 'el Increíbe Paul' ("The Incredible Paul"), and is the older brother of midfielder Juan Cominges.

== Career statistics (player) ==
Appearances and goals by national team and year
National team	Year	Apps	Goals
Peru	1997	6	2
Peru	1998	1	0
Total		7	2

Scores and results list Peru's goal tally first, score column indicates score after each Cominges goal.

List of international goals scored by Paul Cominges
No.	Date	Venue	Opponent	Score	Result	Competition	Ref.
1	18 June 1997	Estadio Olímpico Patria, Sucre, Bolivia	Venezuela	1–0	2–0	1997 Copa América	
2	18 June 1997	Estadio Olímpico Patria, Sucre, Bolivia	Venezuela	2–0	2–0	1997 Copa América	

== Honours ==
=== Player ===
Caracas FC

- Venezuelan Primera División: 2003–04

=== Manager ===
Alianza Universidad

- Peruvian Segunda División: 2024
