= Vasilios Samaras =

Greek footballer

Personal information
- Full name: Vasilios Samaras
- Date of birth: 16 February 1974 (age 52)
- Place of birth: Aridaia, Greece
- Height: 1.80 m (5 ft 11 in)
- Position: Midfielder

Senior career*
Years	Team	Apps	(Gls)
1994–1995	Almopos Aridea		
1995–1998	Panachaiki	94	(5)
1998–1999	PAOK	6	(0)
1999–2000	AEL	17	(2)
2000	Kavala	9	(0)
2001	Athinaikos	12	(1)
2001–2002	Kerkyra	27	(0)
2002–2003	AEP Paphos	23	(0)
2003	Proodeftiki	4	(0)
2004–2006	Veria	78	(5)
2007	Thrasyvoulos	18	(0)
2007–2008	Kavala	23	(1)
2008–2009	Makedonikos	30	(1)
2009–2010	Aetos Skydra		
2010–2011	Niki Volos	13	(0)
2011	Anagennisi Epanomi	11	(0)
- * Club domestic league appearances and goals

Vasilios Samaras (Greek: Βασίλειος Σαμαράς; born 16 February 1974) is a Greek retired football midfielder.

== Career ==
Born in Aridaia, Samaras began playing football with local side Almopos F.C. He signed for Panachaiki in July 1995, and appeared in 94 Alpha Ethniki matches for the club in four seasons. Brief stints in the Alpha Ethniki followed with PAOK, Athinaikos and Proodeftiki. He also played for Almopos, AEL, Kavala, Thrasyvoulos and Makedonikos in the Greek Beta Ethniki and Gamma Ethniki.
