= Joe Nagbe =

Liberian footballer (born 1968)

Personal information
- Full name: Joe Thunder Armstrong Nagbe
- Date of birth: 2 September 1968 (age 58)
- Place of birth: Nimba County, Liberia
- Height: 1.84 m (6 ft 0 in)
- Position: Midfielder

Senior career*
Years	Team	Apps	(Gls)
1980–1983	Young Survivors		
1985–1986	Invincible Eleven		
1986–1987	Mighty Barolle		
1987–1988	Invincible Eleven		
1988–1989	Union Douala		
1989–1990	Stade de Vallauris	19	(2)
1990–1991	Monaco	2	(0)
1991–1993	SAS Épinal	64	(14)
1993–1996	Nice	96	(17)
1996–1997	Lugano	19	(0)
1997–2000	PAOK	77	(10)
2000–2001	Panionios	19	(6)
2001–2002	PAS Giannina	17	(5)
2002–2003	Al-Jazira Club	16	(6)
2003–2004	PSIM Yogyakarta	27	(7)
2004	PSPS Pekanbaru	30	(18)
2005–2006	Persema Malang	22	(3)
2006–2007	Persiba Bantul	17	(2)

International career
1986–2001, 2011	Liberia	77	(0)

Managerial career
- 2010–: Liberia (assistant)
- * Club domestic league appearances and goals

Joe Thunder Armstrong Nagbe (born 2 September 1968) is a Liberian former professional footballer who played as a midfielder. He spent at least ten years playing in Europe, starting off with Monaco then on to Nice. He played in Greece for three years.

== Personal life ==
Nagbe is married and has two sons and two daughters. His daughter Martha plays basketball. He is the father of former footballer Darlington Nagbe.

== Playing career ==
Born in Nimba County, Nagbe started his football sojourn with Young Survivor of Clara Town from 1982 to 1985.

He then joined Invincible Eleven (IE) in 1985 and thereafter played between 1986 and 1987 for Mighty Barolle before returning to IE, where he stayed up to 1988 after winning the National League title.

Along with fellow Liberian international James Debbah, Nagbe moved to Union Douala of Cameroon for the 1989 to 1990 season.

Nagbe and Debbah joined George Weah at AS Monaco for the 1989–90 season, and then found himself at SAS Épinal from 1990 to 1993. The three seasons that followed saw Nagbe at OGC Nice, where he, alongside Debbah, were successful, including a French Cup final win over Guingamp that had another Liberian Christopher Wreh. Nagbe had the opportunity of serving as captain of Nice.

Nagbe then played in Switzerland with AC Lugano for the season of 1996–97.

Nagbe together with his colleagues made history for the Liberia national team when the Lone Star qualified for her first African Cup of Nations finals in South Africa. Before then, Liberia defeated the Tunisia, Mauritania and Togo, but drew with Senegal at home.

Nagbe was then at PAOK for three seasons (1997–2000) and later at Panionios (2000–2001). The next season, he played for PAS Giannina (2001–2002), the period with him as captain when the Liberia reached another African Nations Cup finals but narrowly missed out on the 2002 FIFA World Cup in South Korea and Japan.

His final journey before heading for retirement led Nagbe to Indonesia, where he reunited with dozens of his countrymen. There, he played for PSPS, Persema Malang and PSIM Yogyakarta.

He began playing for the Liberia national team in 1986 and ended in 2001 with 75 caps.

In June 2011 Nagbe came out of retirement to play against Cape Verde.

== Coaching career ==
Upon retiring as a player, Nagbe traveled to Brazil and is now a professional soccer coach, recognized by FIFA, CBF, UEFA and other established soccer organizations.
