= Georgios Koulakiotis =

Greek footballer

Giorgos Koulakiotis
Personal information
- Full name: Giorgos Koulakiotis
- Date of birth: 5 May 1977 (age 49)
- Place of birth: Veria, Greece
- Position: Defender

Senior career*
Years	Team	Apps	(Gls)
1994–1998	Veria	105	(0)
1998–2002	PAOK	61	(2)
2002–2006	Kallithea	87	(6)
2006–2007	Panthrakikos	26	(5)
2007–2008	Agrotikos Asteras	22	(2)
2008	Makedonikos		
- * Club domestic league appearances and goals

Giorgos Koulakiotis (Greek: Γιώργος Κουλακιώτης; born 5 May 1977 in Veria) is a Greek footballer who played as a defender.

== Club career ==
Koulakiotis started playing for Veria in 1994. Four years later he moved to PAOK, where he played for the next four years. In 2002, he went to Kallithea, when the club was playing in first division of Greek championship. In 2006, he continued to Panthrakikos (club of second division), and one year later he moved to Agrotikos Asteras (also club of second division). In 2008, he moved of Makedonikos, club of third division.

== International career ==
Koulakiotis was a member of Greece national team under 21, which played in the final of the European Championship, in 1998.

== Honours ==
PAOK

- Greek Cup: 2000–01

Greece U21

- European Championship: Finalist (1998)
