= Nikolaos Argyriou (footballer, born 1969) =

Greek footballer

Nikos Argyriou
Personal information
- Full name: Nikolaos Argyriou
- Date of birth: 6 January 1969 (age 57)
- Position: Goalkeeper

Senior career*
Years	Team	Apps	(Gls)
1992–1997	Kavala		
1997–1999	PAOK	20	(0)
1999–2000	Iraklis	20	(0)
- * Club domestic league appearances and goals

Nikolaos Argyriou (Greek: Νικος Αργυρίου; born 6 January 1969) is a Greek former professional footballer who played as a goalkeeper.
