= Christos Velis =

Greek-born Cypriot football player

Personal information
- Date of birth: 13 August 1974 (age 52)
- Place of birth: Rhodes
- Position: Midfielder

Senior career*
Years	Team	Apps	(Gls)
1991–1993	Diagoras		
1993–1995	Ialysos		
1995–1997	Athinaikos		
1997–1999	PAOK		
1999–2001	Iraklis		
2001–2004	Anorthosis		
2004–2005	AEK Larnaca		
2005–2006	Diagoras		
2007–2008	Rodos		

International career
2005	Cyprus	2	(0)
- * Club domestic league appearances and goals

Christos Velis (born 13 August 1974) is a retired Greek-born, Cypriot football midfielder. He now coaches children in Rhodes in his football stadium called Βελής and Ορφευς.
