= Dimitris Nalitzis =

Greek footballer (born 1976)

Personal information
- Full name: Dimitrios Nalitzis
- Date of birth: 25 January 1976 (age 50)
- Place of birth: Piraeus, Greece
- Height: 1.88 m (6 ft 2 in)
- Position: Centre forward

Team information
- Current team: AEK Athens (team manager)

Youth career
- Panionios

Senior career*
Years	Team	Apps	(Gls)
1993–1999	Panionios	124	(14)
1999	→ Ethnikos Asteras (loan)	13	(6)
1999–2001	PAOK	44	(20)
2001–2003	Udinese	0	(0)
2001–2002	→ Perugia (loan)	2	(0)
2002	→ Sporting CP (loan)	11	(0)
2002–2003	→ AEK Athens (loan)	18	(10)
2003–2004	AEK Athens	23	(2)
2004–2005	Kerkyra	6	(0)
2005–2006	Panionios	26	(5)
2006	Ethnikos Asteras	11	(1)
2006–2007	AEP	11	(1)
2007–2009	Ethnikos Piraeus	50	(8)
2009–2010	Fostiras	12	(3)
Total		361	(70)

International career
2000–2003	Greece	6	(0)
- * Club domestic league appearances and goals

Dimitris Nalitzis (Greek: Δημήτρης Ναλιτζής; born 25 January 1976) is a Greek former professional footballer who played as a centre forward. He is the current team manager of AEK Athens.

Over the course of 11 seasons (17 overall) he amassed Super League Greece totals of 230 games and 55 goals in representation of five teams, mainly Panionios.

== Club career ==
Nalitzis was born in Piraeus. His family has hails from Rizia.

After starting professionally with Panionios, making his league debut at the age of 17 and remaining with the club for six seasons. In 1999 was loaned to Ethnikos Asteras. His performances ta the club earned him a move to PAOK, where he played for two seasons. In the summer of 2001 Nalitzis he was transferred to Udinese for a fee of 750,000€. At Udinese he did not made any official appearance and during his spell at the club he was loaned to Perugia Calcio and Sporting CP.

On 4 August he returned to Greece and was loaned to AEK Athens for a season with a buy-out option. After a good first season at the club his move was eventually made paremanent on 4 July 2003 for a fee of €200,000. However, he had a mediocre second season scoring twice.

On 28 July 2004 his contract was terminated and joined the lower division Kerkyra, In the following season he returned to Panionios and then to Ethnikos Asteras. In 2006 moved to Cyprus and signed for AEP Paphos, scoring his only league goal as an import during his career. In the following season he moved to Ethnikos Piraeus for two seasons. In 2009 he joined Fostiras and after a season Nalitzis retired in 2010, at the age of 34.

== International career ==
Nalitzis made six appearances for Greece, during roughly three years. His debut came on 26 April 2000, in a 1–0 friendly win over the Republic of Ireland in Dublin.

== Honours ==
=== Club ===
Panionios

- Greek Football Cup: 1997–98

PAOK

- Greek Football Cup: 2000–01

Sporting

- Primeira Liga: 2001–02
- Taça de Portugal: 2001–02

=== Individual ===
- Alpha Ethniki top scorer 1999–2000
