= Super League Greece 2 =

Second-tier professional men's association football league in Greece

Super League 2
- Organising body: A2 National Division Professional Football Association
- Founded: 1962; 64 years ago (as Beta Ethniki); 2019; 7 years ago (as Super League 2)
- Country: Greece
- Confederation: UEFA
- Number of clubs: 16 (since 2026–27)
- Level on pyramid: 2
- Promotion to: Super League 1
- Relegation to: Gamma Ethniki
- Domestic cup: Greek Cup
- International cup: UEFA Europa League (via Greek Cup)
- Current champions: Iraklis (2nd title); Kalamata (3rd title) (2025–26)
- Most championships: Panachaiki (6 titles)
- Top scorer: Ilias Chatzieleftheriou (152 goals)
- Broadcasters: ERT, superbet.gr
- Sponsor: Superbet
- Website: www.sl2.gr
- Current: 2026–27 Super League Greece 2

The Super League 2 (Greek: Σούπερ Λιγκ 2), also officially known as A2 Ethniki Katigoria (Greek: Α2 Εθνική Κατηγορία, lit. 'A2 National Division'), is the second-tier professional men's association football league in Greece. Made up of 16 teams, it is usually played from September to May. Super League 2 is ranked below the Greek Super League 1 and above the Greek Third National Division in the Greek football league system. All of the Super League 2 clubs take part in the Greek Football Cup, the annual Greek Cup competition.

== History ==
The league was founded in 2019, after the restructuring of the Greek football league championships, replacing the Football League (former Beta Ethniki) as the second level in the league pyramid.

Twelve (12) clubs participated in the league's first season and second season of operation.

For the third season (2021–2022) the league was restructured after the abolition of the third level Football League. Starting with this season, the league became known as Betsson Super League 2 as the online betting operator entered into a title sponsorship agreement. The league included 24 teams including Olympiacos, PAOK, Panathinaikos and AEK Athens also participating. Levadiakos was promoted to Super League and did not participate; A.E. Kifisia F.C. was an addition relegated from Super League.

For the fifth season (2023–2024), the league remained split into two groups with a reduction to twenty four clubs.

For the sixth season (2024–2025), the league continued with two groups with a further reduction of the clubs to twenty.

For the seventh season (2025–2026), the league continued with two groups and overall twenty teams like the previous year.

Starting from 2026–2027 season, the championship is planned to be held with 16 teams in one group after the further reduction of the teams from last year with 30 matchdays, without play-offs for the promotion and play-outs for the relegation.

== Seasons in second division (1959–60 – present) ==
This is the complete list of the clubs that have taken part in the second division played from the 1959–60 season until the 2021–22 season of Super League 2. The teams in bold will compete in Super League 2 in the 2026–27 season.

Seasons	Clubs
37	**Apollon Kalamarias**, **Kallithea**
36	Levadiakos, **Niki Volos**, **Anagennisi Karditsa**
35	Olympiacos Volos
33	Veria
32	Atromitos, Panetolikos, Panachaiki
31	Trikala, Makedonikos
30	Proodeftiki
29	Panelefsiniakos, Pierikos, PAS Giannina, **Panserraikos**
27	Edessaikos, Kastoria, Ethnikos Asteras, Doxa Drama, Diagoras Rodou, Ionikos, **AEL**
26	Korinthos
25	Kalamata, Kavala
24	Naoussa
23	Xanthi
22	Anagennisi Giannitsa
21	Fostiras
20	Atromitos Piraeus, Panegialios, Acharnaikos, Egaleo
19	**Panthrakikos**
18	Vyzas Megara, OFI, Panargiakos
17	Agrotikos Asteras, Kilkisiakos, Lamia
16	Rodos, Chania, Ilisiakos, Kerkyra
15	Chalkida, Ergotelis, Apollon Smyrnis, Irodotos
14	Panarkadikos
13	Paniliakos, Almopos Arideas
12	Athinaikos, Argonaftis Piraeus, Aris Ptolemaida, Anagennisi Epanomi, Kozani
11	Pannafpliakos, Aias Salaminas, Anagennisi Artas
10	Ethnikos Piraeus, Pandramaikos, APS Patrae, Iraklis
9	Charavgiakos, E.A. Rethymniakou
8	Doxa Vyronas, Koropi
7	Olympiacos Chalkida, Ikaros Athens, MENT, Aspida Xanthi, Olympiacos Neon Liosion, Eordaikos, Thrasyvoulos, Apollon Larissa
6	Apollon Kalamata, Olympiacos Kozani, Thermaikos Thessaloniki, Rodiakos, A.O. Karditsa, Foinikas Polichni, Florina, Ilioupoli, Patraikos, **PAOK B**
5	Orfeas Xanthi, Apollon Serres, PAS Averof, AE Chania, Larisaikos, Iraklis Kavala, Thyella Patras, Pagkorinthiakos, Olympiakos Loutraki, Orchomenos, Elpis Drama, Filippi Kavala, Aiginiakos, Ialysos, Panaspropyrgiakos, Karaiskakis, Rouf, Kampaniakos, **Panionios**, **Olympiacos B**, **Zakynthos**
4	Aris Piraeus, Pallamiaki, Chalkidona, Iraklis Serres, Asteras Athens, Megas Alexandros Irakleia, Evripos Chalkida, Megas Alexandros Thessalonikis, Phoebus Kremasti, Nikiforos Florina, Orfeas, Agios Nikolaos, Iraklis Psachna, Fokikos, GS Alexandroupolis, Aris, Episkopi, Ierapetra, AEK Athens B, **Nestos Chrysoupoli**
3	Olympiacos Patras, Olympiacos Lamia, Asteras Tripolis, Saframpoli, Kadmos Thiva, Panchaniakos, Iraklis Larissa, Kalogreza, Apollon Mytilini, Thiva, Apollon Krya Vrysi, Petralona, Dorieus Rodos, Moudania, Makedonikos Siatista, Agios Dimitrios, Aiolikos, Pontioi Veria, ASK Olympiacos, Haidari, AEL Kalloni, Ethnikos Gazorou, Ethnikos Alexandroupoli, Sparti, Platanias, Panathinaikos B, A.E. Kifisia, **Asteras Tripolis B**
2	Olympos Katerini, Omilos Kalamata, Aris Kastoria, Aris Korinthos, Aris Mytilini, Mikrasiatiki Chios, Preveza, Aris Drama, Achilleas Trikala, Amfissaikos, Anaplasis Tyrnavous, Spartiatikos, Talos Chania, Komotini, Nikaia, Eleftheroupoli, Dimitra Trikala, Chalandri, Tyrnavos, Mytilini, Leonidas Sparta, Orestis Orestiada, AE Kavala, Pyrsos Grevena, Syros, Achilleas Farsala, Aris Agios Konstantinos, Ethnikos Sidirokastro, Elassona, Achaiki, Anagennisi Kolindros, Poseidon Neon Poron, ILTEX Lykoi, Akratitos, Kassandra, Tyrnavos, Kissamikos, Thesprotos, **Hellas Syros**, **Marko**
1	Meliteas, Prasina Poulia, Pallevadiaki, Atromitos Ioannina, Trikala, Chalkida, Aetos Chios, Aris Tripoli, Pallesviakos, Achilleas Mytilini, Aris Proti, Atlantis Chania, Parrodiakos, Megas Alexandros Katerini, Aris Larissa, Mytilini, Panchiakos, Atsalenios, Lamiakos, Iraklis Volos, Orfeas Komotini, Alexandroupoli, Achilleas Triandria, Doxa Neapoli, AEK Kalamata, Tripoli, Sparti, Rethymniakos, Aris Chios, Doxa Piraeus, Atromitos Serres, Elpida Nigrita, Xirokrini, Ioannina, Bizani, Asteras Amaliadas, Pannemeatikos, Niki Polygyros, Amfiali, Moschato, Akrites Sykies, Rigas Feraios Velestino, Thyella Serres, Messolonghi, Drapetsona, Pelopas Kiato, Odysseas Kordelio, Toxotis Volos, Langadas, A.O. Pyrgos, Nafpaktiakos Asteras, Messiniakos, Asteras Magoulas, Vataniakos, Glyfada, AEK Athens, Ermionida, Trachones Alimou, Volos, Aittitos Spata, Asteras Vlachioti, Giouchtas, Tilikratis, Ethnikos Neo Keramidi, **Pyrgos**

== Teams ==
=== 2026–27 season ===
The following 16 clubs will compete in the Super League 2 in the 2026–27 season.

Locations of the 2026–27 Super League Greece 2 teams

Note: The table is listed in alphabetical order.

Team	Location	Stadium	Capacity
AEL	Larissa	AEL FC Arena	16,118
Anagennisi Karditsa	Karditsa	Karditsa Municipal Stadium	3,500
Apollon Kalamaria	Kalamaria	Kalamaria Stadium	6,500
Asteras Tripolis B	Tripoli	Theodoros Kolokotronis Stadium	7,423
Athens Kallithea	Kallithea	Grigoris Lamprakis Stadium	6,300
Hellas Syros	Ermoupoli	Ermoupoli Municipal Stadium	2,500
Marko	Markopoulo	Municipal Stadium of Markopoulo	3,000
Nestos Chrysoupoli	Chrysoupoli	Chrysoupoli Municipal Stadium	5,000
Niki Volos	Volos	Pantelis Magoulas Stadium	2,500
Olympiacos B	Piraeus	Rentis Training Centre	3,000
Panionios	Nea Smyrni	Nea Smyrni Stadium	11,700
Panserraikos	Serres	Serres Municipal Stadium	9,500
Panthrakikos	Komotini	Komotini Municipal Stadium	6,198
PAOK B	Kalamaria	Kalamaria Stadium	6,500
Pyrgos	Pyrgos	Pyrgos Municipal Stadium	6,750
Zakynthos	Zakynthos	Zakynthos Municipal Stadium	5,000

== Results ==
=== Second Division champions (1960 until 2023–24) ===
==== From 1960 to 1962 ====
Season	Winner
1960	Atromitos Piraeus (1), Fostiras (1), Thermaikos Thessaloniki (1)
1961	Egaleo (1), Panelefsiniakos (1), Niki Volos (1), Aspis Xanthi (1)
1962	Panegialios (1), Pierikos (1)

==== From 1962 to 1983 ====
Season	Winner
1962–63	Edessaikos (1), Doxa Drama (1), Olympiacos Chalkida (1), Pagkorinthiakos (1)
1963–64	Panachaiki (1), Proodeftiki (1), Philippi Kavala (1)
1964–65	Panserraikos (1), Edessaikos (2), Egaleo (2), Vyzas Megara (1)
1965–66	Veria (1), OFI (1), Vyzas Megara (2)
1966–67	Panelefsiniakos (1), Kavala (1), Olympiacos Volos (1)
1967–68	Chalkida (1), Trikala (1)
1968–69	Panachaiki (2), Kavala (2)
1969–70	Apollon Smyrnis (1), Veria (2), Fostiras (2)
1970–71	Panachaiki (3), Trikala (2), Olympiacos Volos (2)
1971–72	Panserraikos (2), Kalamata (1), Atromitos (1)
1972–73	Apollon Smyrnis (2), Apollon Kalamarias (1), AEL (1)
1973–74	PAS Giannina (1), Kastoria (1), Kalamata (2)
1974–75	Apollon Smyrnis (3), Panetolikos (1), Pierikos (2)
1975–76	Kavala (3), OFI (2)
1976–77	Egaleo (3), Veria (3)
1977–78	Rodos (1), AEL (2)
1978–79	Doxa Drama (2), Korinthos (1)
1979–80	Panserraikos (3), Atromitos (2)
1980–81	Rodos (2), Iraklis (1)
1981–82	Panachaiki (4), Makedonikos (1)
1982–83	Egaleo (4), Apollon Kalamarias (2)

==== From 1983 to 2019 ====
Season	Winner
1983–84	Panachaiki (5)
1984–85	PAS Giannina (2)
1985–86	Diagoras (1)
1986–87	Panachaiki (6)
1987–88	Doxa Drama (3)
1988–89	Xanthi (1)
1989–90	Athinaikos (1)
1990–91	Ethnikos Piraeus (1)
1991–92	Apollon Kalamarias (3)
1992–93	Naoussa (1)
1993–94	Ionikos (1)
1994–95	Paniliakos (1)

Season	Winner
1995–96	Kavala (4)
1996–97	Panionios (1)
1997–98	Aris (1)
1998–99	Trikala (4)
1999–00	Athinaikos (2)
2000–01	Egaleo (5)
2001–02	PAS Giannina (3)
2002–03	Chalkidona (1)
2003–04	Kerkyra (1)
2004–05	AEL (3)
2005–06	Ergotelis (1)
2006–07	Asteras Tripolis (1)

Season	Winner
2007–08	Panserraikos (4)
2008–09	Atromitos (3)
2009–10	Olympiacos Volos (3)
2010–11	Panetolikos (2)
2011–12	Panthrakikos (1)
2012–13	Apollon Smyrnis (4)
2013–14	Niki Volos (2)
2014–15	AEK Athens (1)
2015–16	AEL (4)
2016–17	Apollon Smyrnis (5)
2017–18	OFI (3)
2018–19	Volos (1)

==== From 2019 to Present ====
Season	Winner	Top Scorer
2019–20	PAS Giannina (4)	11 - (United States) Joseph Efford (Ergotelis)
2020–21	Ionikos (2)	15 - (Argentina) Matías Castro (Ionikos)
2021–22	Levadiakos (1)	24 - (Greece) Giannis Pasas (Veria)
2022–23	Panserraikos (5), A.E. Kifisia (1)	19 - (Serbia) Kosta Aleksić (Iraklis)
2023–24	Levadiakos (2), Athens Kallithea (1)	18 - (Greece) Giannis Loukinas (Athens Kallithea); 18 - (Greece) Georgios Manalis (Chania)
2024–25	AEL (5), A.E. Kifisia (2)	24 - (Greece) Giannis Pasas (AEL)
2025–26	Iraklis (2), Kalamata (3)	16 - (Greece) Giannis Loukinas (Niki Volos)

== Top scorers and appearances (1998 - 1999 - present) ==
Most appearances
Rank	Name	Appearances	Teams
1	Konstantinos Chatzis	412	Kastoria, Kalamata, Ionikos, Diagoras, Pierikos, AEL Larissa, Niki Volos, Eginiakos, Apollon Smyrni, Panachaiki, Agrotikos Asteras, Apollon Larissa, Iraklis Larissa
2	Nikos Pourtoulidis	363	Thrasyvoulos, Asteras Tripolis, Ilisiakos, Kalamata, Pierikos, Niki Volos, OFI, Apollon Kalamarias, Iraklis
3	Georgios Syros	303	Akratitos, Kerkyra, Thrasyvoulos, Kallithea, Ethnikos Piraeus
4	Athanasios Tolios	301	Veroia, Panserraikos, PAS Giannina, Pierikos, Trikala, Iraklis Psachnon, Eginiakos
5	Stelios Kritikos	296	Ethnikos Asteras, Ethnikos Piraeus, Ionikos, Ilioupoli, Vyzas Megaron, AEL Larissa, Iraklis Psachnon, Chania, Apollon Smyrni, Panegialios, Kerkyra, Kifisia
6	Panagiotis Giazitzoglou	292	Pierikos, Eginiakos
7	Dimitrios Samaras	281	Veroia, Doxa Drama, Niki Volos, Eginiakos, Tyrnavos 2005, Apollon Kalamarias
8	Stergios Psianos	277	Apollon Kalamarias, Ethnikos Piraeus, Thrasyvoulos, Niki Volos, Apollon Smyrnis, Acharnaikos, Chania, AE Karaiskakis
9	Dimitris Mavrias	273	Glyfada, Anagennisi Karditsas, Apollon Larissas, Panachaiki, Doxa Dramas, AEL Larissa, Ilioupoli, Kallithea
10	Fotis Kiskampanis	255	AEL Larissa, Olympiacos Volos, Kastoria, Messiniakos, Kallithea, Apollon Kalamarias, Tyrnavos 2005, Anagennisi Karditsas
11	Angelos Vertzos	251	Paniliakos, Proodeftiki, Veroia, Doxa Drama, Niki Volos, Apollon Smyrni, AEL Larissa, Trikala, Kerkyra, Diagoras
12	Thanasis Gogas	250	Kavala, Kerkyra, Panserraikos, Ionikos, Anagennisi Karditsa, Ethnikos Asteras, PS Serres, Asteras Magoulas
13	Charalampos Brilakis	243	Kalamata, Diagoras, Trikala, Panserraikos, Kallithea, Chania
14	Georgios Chatzizisis	241	Panegialios, Chaidari, Ethnikos Asteras, AEL Kalloni - Apollon Smyrnis, Apollon Kalamarias, AS Kassandra, Olympiacos Volos, Pierikos, Doxa Dramas, Apollon Smyrnis
15	Georgios Chorianopoulos	239	Panegialios, Chaidari, Ethnikos Asteras, Kalloni
15	Alexandros Tsemperidis	239	Proodeftiki, Ilisiakos, Kastoria, Kerkyra, Ethnikos Piraeus, Panachaiki, Apollon Smyrnis, AEL Larissa, Agrotikos Asteras, Acharnaikos, Apollon Kalamarias, Anagennisi Triglias
16	Georgios Paraskevaidis	237	Athinaikos, Fostiras, Ethnikos Asteras, Kerkyra, Panserraikos
16	Theodoros Gitkos	237	PAS Giannina, Kerkyra, Niki Volos, Ethnikos Asteras, Olympiacos Volos
17	Polychronis Vezyridis	232	Athinaikos, Kerkyra, Panserraikos, Olympiacos Volos, OFI Crete
18	Andreas Vasilogiannis	227	Ethnikos Piraeus, Chania, Lamia, Kissamikos, Kalamata, Kallithea
19	Christos Tzioras	223	Niki Volos, Apollon Smyrnis, Acharnaikos, AE Karaiskakis, Kissamikos, Levadiakos
20	Georgios Tsoukalidis	221	Pierikos, Nafpaktiakos Asteras, Kerkyra, Levadiakos, Chaidari, Asteras Tripolis, Agrotikos Asteras
Foreign players
1	Paolo Farinola	259	Ethnikos Piraeus, Veroia, Kallithea, Apollon Smyrnis, Egaleo
2	Ivan Rusev	207	Egaleo, Apollon Smyrnis, Athinaikos, Levadiakos, Diagoras, Trikala, OFI Crete, Pierikos, Doxa Dramas
3	Deniz Baykara	195	Panserraikos, Panetolikos, Panthrakikos, Trikala, Doxa Dramas
4	Kwame Pele Frimpong	179	Kalamata, Chaidari, Ilysiakos, Egaleo, Thrasyvoulos
5	Božidar Tadić	176	Panserraikos, OFI Crete, Veroia, Niki Volos

Most goals
Rank	Name	Goals	Teams
1	Giannis Loukinas	137	Fokikos, Chania, Iraklis, AE Karaiskakis, Platanias, Veroia, Kalamata, Kallithea, Niki Volos
2	Georgios Saitiotis	95	Ilisiakos, Ilioupoli - AS Kassandra, Olympiacos Volos, Niki Volos, Veroia, AEL Larissa
2	Giannis Pasas	95	Panetolikos, Iraklis, Aris, Kerkyra, Veroia, Kalamata, AEL Larissa
3	Ilias Kampas	93	Ilisiakos, Ilioupoli
4	Nikos Kouskounas	84	Asteras Tripolis, Trikala, OFI Crete, Doxa Dramas, Kissamikos, Chania, Panachaiki, Niki Volos
5	Ilias Solakis	81	Niki Volos, Kastoria, PAS Giannina, Diagoras, Olympiacos Volos, Panachaiki
6	Nikos Soultanidis	76	Kastoria, Agrotikos Asteras, Kavala, Panthrakikos
7	Marko Markovski	68	Kallithea, Doxa Dramas, Apollon Smyrnis, Kalamata
8	Giorgos Zacharopoulos	65	Kallithea, Chalkidona, Thrasyvoulos
9	Mattheos Maroukakis	64	Kallithea, Panachaiki, AEL Larissa, Trikala, Aittitos Spata
9	Alexandros Arnarellis	64	Vyzas Megaron, Kallithea, Kerkyra, Trikala, Panegialios, Doxa Dramas, Chania, Rodos, Egaleo, Kalamata
9	Georgios Manalis	64	Ionikos, Kissamikos, Chania, Kifisia, Iraklis
10	Furtado	62	Ionikos, PAS Giannina, Panachaiki, Panegialios, Panserraikos, Sparti
11	Christos Tzioras	60	Niki Volos, Apollon Smyrnis, Acharnaikos, AE Karaiskakis, Kissamikos, Levadiakos
12	Stelios Kritikos	59	Ethnikos Piraeus, Ionikos, Ilioupoli, Vyzas Megaron, AEL Larissa, Iraklis Psachnon, Chania, Apollon Smyrni, Panegialios, Kerkyra, Kifisia
13	Thanasis Gogas	58	Kavala, Kerkyra, Panserraikos, Ionikos, Anagennisi Karditsa, Ethnikos Asteras, PS Serres, Asteras Magoulas
14	Sokratis Boudouris	56	Anagennisi Karditsas, Patraikos, Poseidon Neon Poron, Olympiacos Volos, Panthrakikos
15	Vangelis Kaounos	52	Ethnikos Asteras, Kalamata, Panetolikos, AEL Larissa - Ethnikos Asteras
16	Patrick Ogunsoto	50	Ergotelis, OFI Crete, Anagennisi Epanomis, Olympiacos Volos, Acharnaikos
16	Theodoros Tsirigotis	50	Episkopi, Panathinaikos B, Levadiakos, AEL Larissa, Iraklis
16	Panagiotis Moraitis	50	Panachaiki, Apollon Smyrnis, AEL Larissa, Panionios
17	Ilias Anastasakos	49	Athinaikos, Apollon Smyrnis, Asteras Tripolis, Thrasyvoulos, AEL Larissa, Sparti
17	Dimitrios Manos	49	Ergotelis, OFI Crete, Chania, Ilioupoli
18	Ivan Rusev	48	Egaleo, Apollon Smyrnis, Athinaikos, Levadiakos, Diagoras, Trikala, OFI Crete, Pierikos, Doxa Dramas
19	Ilias Ioannou	47	Kerkyra, Asteras Tripolis, Olympiacos Volos, Trachones Alimou
20	Christos Rovas	45	Iraklis, Doxa Dramas, Almopos, Kalamata, Panachaiki, Egaleo, Kampaniakos
20	Dimitrios Mavrias	45	Glyfada, Anagennisi Karditsas, Apollon Larissas, Panachaiki, Doxa Dramas, AEL Larissa, Ilioupoli, Kallithea

== See also ==
- Greek football league system
- Greek Football Cup
- Greek football PSAP awards
- Football records and statistics in Greece
- Super League Greece 2 Super Cup
