= 1991–92 Beta Ethniki =

Beta Ethniki
- Season: 1991–92
- Dates: 22 September 1991 – 10 May 1992
- Champions: Apollon Kalamarias
- Promoted: Apollon Kalamarias; Ionikos; Edessaikos
- Relegated: Egaleo; Diagoras; Kastoria; Trikala

Beta Ethniki 1991–92 complete season.

== League table ==
Location of teams in 1991–92 Beta Ethniki

Pos	Team	Pld	W	D	L	GF	GA	GD	Pts	Promotion or relegation
1	Apollon Kalamarias (C, P)	34	20	9	5	54	24	+30	49	Promotion to Alpha Ethniki
2	Ionikos (P)	34	16	13	5	46	24	+22	45	Promotion to Alpha Ethniki
3	Edessaikos (P)	34	17	10	7	42	22	+20	44	Promotion to Alpha Ethniki
4	Naoussa	34	17	9	8	55	37	+18	43	
5	Levadiakos	34	13	11	10	40	34	+6	37	
6	Kavala	34	13	10	11	32	39	−7	36	
7	Doxa Vyronas	34	10	14	10	36	35	+1	34	
8	Panargiakos	34	14	6	14	39	36	+3	34	
9	Charavgiakos	34	12	9	13	25	29	−4	33	
10	Olympiacos Volos	34	13	7	14	31	35	−4	33	
11	Anagennisi Giannitsa	34	8	16	10	25	30	−5	32	
12	Rethymniakos	34	9	14	11	31	33	−2	32	
13	Atromitos	34	11	10	13	24	32	−8	32	
14	PAS Giannina	34	11	9	14	36	43	−7	31	
15	Egaleo (R)	34	9	11	14	38	47	−9	29	Relegation to Gamma Ethniki
16	Diagoras (R)	34	6	15	13	21	35	−14	27	Relegation to Gamma Ethniki
17	Kastoria (R)	34	8	8	18	31	42	−11	24	Relegation to Gamma Ethniki
18	Trikala (R)	34	6	5	23	20	49	−29	17	Relegation to Gamma Ethniki

(C) Champions; (P) Promoted; (R) Relegated

== Results ==
Home \ Away	ANG	APL	ATR	CHV	DIA	DXV	EDE	EGA	ION	KAS	KAV	LEV	NAO	EOV	PRG	PAS	RTY	TRI
Anagennisi Giannitsa		1–2	2–1	1–1	1–0	1–1	1–2	1–1	0–0	1–3	1–1	3–1	3–1	0–0	0–1	1–0	1–0	1–0
Apollon Kalamarias	3–0		5–0	2–1	1–0	1–0	1–1	2–1	0–0	2–0	2–0	3–0	3–0	3–0	4–1	3–2	0–0	1–0
Atromitos	1–1	0–1		1–2	3–0	2–1	0–0	2–1	0–0	0–0	1–0	1–0	1–1	2–0	1–0	0–0	1–0	2–0
Charavgiakos	1–0	1–1	0–2		1–0	1–0	0–1	1–0	0–1	0–1	0–0	2–0	1–0	2–0	0–3	3–1	1–1	2–0
Diagoras	0–0	0–1	2–0	2–1		1–1	0–1	1–1	0–0	2–1	1–3	1–0	1–1	0–0	0–0	0–0	0–0	2–0
Doxa Vyronas	1–0	1–1	1–0	0–0	0–1		2–2	0–1	1–1	0–0	0–0	1–0	2–2	0–2	3–0	0–0	0–0	1–0
Edessaikos	0–0	1–1	1–0	2–0	2–0	1–1		2–0	3–0	1–0	6–0	1–1	0–2	1–0	1–0	3–0	1–1	2–0
Egaleo	3–3	1–0	0–0	0–0	2–2	2–4	0–1		0–0	3–2	1–1	3–3	1–3	3–0	1–0	2–3	1–0	1–0
Ionikos	2–0	2–0	0–0	3–1	1–1	2–3	2–0	5–1		1–0	4–1	4–1	3–2	1–0	3–1	0–0	2–1	2–0
Kastoria	0–1	2–4	3–0	0–1	1–1	1–2	1–1	0–0	1–1		0–0	0–1	1–3	1–0	1–0	3–1	1–0	0–1
Kavala	2–0	1–1	2–0	2–0	2–0	0–0	1–0	1–0	2–1	2–1		0–0	1–1	0–2	1–0	2–0	1–1	3–2
Levadiakos	0–0	0–2	2–0	0–0	3–0	3–0	1–1	1–0	0–0	2–2	1–0		1–1	3–0	1–0	2–0	2–0	2–1
Naoussa	0–0	4–0	1–2	0–1	1–1	3–2	1–2	3–2	1–0	1–0	4–0	3–1		1–0	3–0	3–2	4–3	1–0
Olympiacos Volos	1–0	0–0	1–1	1–0	3–0	1–1	0–1	0–1	1–1	2–1	2–1	1–0	1–2		3–1	2–1	3–2	2–0
Panargiakos	0–0	0–0	2–0	3–1	1–1	3–2	1–0	2–0	2–0	1–3	2–0	1–1	1–0	2–1		3–1	0–0	5–1
PAS Giannina	0–0	0–2	2–0	1–0	1–1	0–2	2–1	2–1	0–0	2–0	4–0	1–4	0–0	3–1	1–0		0–0	3–1
Rethymniakos	1–1	2–1	1–0	0–0	1–0	2–1	2–0	1–1	0–2	3–1	1–0	1–2	1–1	0–0	0–2	3–1		3–2
Trikala	0–0	2–1	0–0	0–0	1–0	1–2	1–0	1–3	1–2	2–0	0–2	1–1	0–1	0–1	2–1	0–2	0–0	

Legend: Blue = home team win; Yellow = draw; Red = away team win.

== Top scorers ==
Rank	Player	Club	Goals
1	(Greece) Dimitris Nolis	Apollon Kalamarias	21
2	(Greece) Vasilios Tsiartas	Naoussa	13
2	(Greece) Michalis Alexiadis	Naoussa	13
4	(Greece) Michalis Baxevanoglou	Kavala	12
4	(Greece) Michalis Ziogas	Ionikos	12
4	(Greece) Papadopoulos	Panargiakos	12
