= 1992–93 Beta Ethniki =

Beta Ethniki
- Season: 1992–93
- Dates: 20 September 1992 – 2 May 1993
- Champions: Naoussa
- Promoted: Naoussa; Levadiakos; Panionios
- Relegated: Panserraikos; Eordaikos; Panetolikos; Doxa Vyronas

Beta Ethniki 1992–93 complete season.

== League table ==
Location of teams in 1992–93 Beta Ethniki

Pos	Team	Pld	W	D	L	GF	GA	GD	Pts	Promotion or relegation
1	Naoussa (C, P)	34	18	9	7	59	40	+19	63	Promotion to Alpha Ethniki
2	Levadiakos (P)	34	18	7	9	53	33	+20	61	Promotion to Alpha Ethniki
3	Panionios (P)	34	17	9	8	56	28	+28	60	Promotion to Alpha Ethniki
4	Panargiakos	34	17	8	9	46	39	+7	59	
5	Rethymniakos	34	14	6	14	42	39	+3	48	
6	PAS Giannina	34	13	8	13	34	39	−5	47	
7	Kavala	34	12	10	12	35	30	+5	46	
8	Olympiacos Volos	34	13	6	15	39	48	−9	45	
9	Ethnikos Piraeus	34	11	11	12	29	31	−2	44	
10	Pontioi Veria	34	11	11	12	40	47	−7	44	
11	Charavgiakos	34	12	6	16	35	46	−11	42	
12	Anagennisi Giannitsa	34	12	6	16	46	52	−6	42	
13	Atromitos	34	10	12	12	29	31	−2	42	
14	Proodeftiki	34	9	14	11	37	40	−3	41	
15	Panserraikos (R)	34	10	11	13	31	38	−7	41	Relegation to Gamma Ethniki
16	Eordaikos (Note: Eordaikos had 3 points deducted.) (R)	34	11	8	15	44	52	−8	38	Relegation to Gamma Ethniki
17	Panetolikos (R)	34	10	8	16	31	46	−15	38	Relegation to Gamma Ethniki
18	Doxa Vyronas (R)	34	8	10	16	32	39	−7	34	Relegation to Gamma Ethniki

(C) Champions; (P) Promoted; (R) Relegated

== Results ==
Home \ Away	ANG	ATR	CHV	DXV	EOR	ETH	KAV	LEV	NAO	EOV	PRG	PNT	PIO	PSE	PAS	PVR	PRO	RTY
Anagennisi Giannitsa		2–1	2–1	2–1	3–0	0–1	2–1	4–1	1–1	2–1	3–0	3–3	1–2	1–2	0–2	2–1	3–0	1–2
Atromitos	0–0		0–1	1–0	0–0	2–0	1–0	0–0	0–0	4–0	1–1	1–0	0–1	1–1	1–0	2–1	2–0	2–1
Charavgiakos	1–0	2–1		2–1	0–2	2–1	0–0	1–2	1–2	1–0	1–2	3–0	2–0	3–3	1–2	1–0	0–0	1–0
Doxa Vyronas	1–2	2–0	4–2		2–1	0–0	1–0	2–2	2–0	2–2	1–0	0–1	0–1	1–0	0–1	0–1	1–1	1–1
Eordaikos	1–0	0–1	0–1	0–0		0–0	0–0	0–2	1–1	2–2	0–0	3–1	1–0	2–0	2–0	1–1	1–1	4–2
Ethnikos Piraeus	1–2	1–1	3–1	1–0	1–1		0–3	2–0	1–1	0–2	0–0	2–1	1–0	3–0	2–0	4–1	0–0	2–0
Kavala	1–0	0–0	3–1	2–0	0–2	3–0		2–0	2–1	1–1	0–1	2–1	0–0	5–0	0–1	0–0	2–0	0–1
Levadiakos	5–0	0–0	1–0	2–0	2–0	2–0	3–0		1–2	3–0	0–0	3–0	2–1	5–1	2–0	4–1	1–0	1–0
Naoussa	5–1	3–1	2–0	1–0	6–4	1–1	1–2	1–0		2–1	1–2	1–0	1–0	4–2	4–2	3–0	1–1	1–2
Olympiacos Volos	0–0	1–0	0–1	2–1	2–1	1–0	2–0	1–0	0–1		1–0	4–0	1–1	3–1	2–1	0–1	2–0	1–0
Panargiakos	1–0	2–2	3–0	3–2	2–0	1–0	2–1	0–0	3–1	3–0		1–2	1–0	1–0	2–1	1–0	4–1	1–2
Panetolikos	1–1	1–0	2–2	0–4	0–1	0–0	3–0	1–1	1–1	3–1	2–0		0–2	1–0	1–0	1–1	0–0	3–1
Panionios	4–3	1–1	2–0	4–0	2–0	2–0	1–1	5–0	2–2	4–1	3–1	3–1		2–0	4–0	2–2	4–1	3–1
Panserraikos	3–2	2–0	1–0	0–0	0–1	2–0	1–1	0–1	2–2	4–1	6–1	0–1	3–0		2–1	1–1	2–1	3–1
PAS Giannina	2–0	2–1	1–1	0–0	1–0	0–0	0–0	4–2	0–1	1–1	1–1	1–0	1–0	1–0		2–2	2–1	0–0
Pontioi Veria	3–1	1–1	3–1	1–1	2–0	1–2	0–2	0–0	0–0	1–0	1–1	2–0	0–1	1–1	3–2		1–0	2–1
Proodeftiki	2–2	2–0	1–1	1–1	0–0	1–0	1–1	1–1	1–2	4–2	4–2	1–0	0–0	4–1	2–0	2–0		3–1
Rethymniakos	1–0	3–1	2–0	2–1	3–0	0–0	3–0	2–0	0–2	3–1	2–3	1–0	0–0	0–0	1–2	3–0	0–0	

Legend: Blue = home team win; Yellow = draw; Red = away team win.

== Top scorers ==
Rank	Player	Club	Goals
1	(Greece) Kostas Tsanas	Levadiakos	14
2	(Federal Republic of Yugoslavia) Miroslav Živković	Naoussa	13
3	(Federal Republic of Yugoslavia) Predrag Mitić	Rethymniakos	12
3	(Bulgaria) Nikolay Petrunov	Panserraikos	12
5	(Greece) Michalis Alexiadis	Naoussa	11
5	(Bosnia and Herzegovina) Davorin Juričić	Atromitos	11
5	(Federal Republic of Yugoslavia) Vladimir Kojić	Levadiakos	11
5	(Federal Republic of Yugoslavia) Arsen Mihajlović	Anagennisi Giannitsa	11
5	(Greece) Tsalkintzis	Anagennisi Giannitsa	11
5	(Hungary) Imre Boda	Olympiacos Volos	11
5	(Bulgaria) Ivaylo Pantchev	Panserraikos	11
