= 1988–89 Beta Ethniki =

Beta Ethniki
- Season: 1988–89
- Dates: 11 September 1988 – 28 May 1989
- Champions: Xanthi
- Promoted: Xanthi; Panserraikos; Ionikos
- Relegated: Kavala

Beta Ethniki 1988–89 complete season.

== League table ==
Location of teams in 1988–89 Beta Ethniki

Pos	Team	Pld	W	D	L	GF	GA	GD	Pts	Promotion or relegation
1	Xanthi (C, P)	34	17	10	7	60	33	+27	44	Promotion to Alpha Ethniki
2	Panserraikos (P)	34	14	13	7	48	33	+15	41	Promotion to Alpha Ethniki
3	Ionikos (P)	34	16	8	10	46	41	+5	40	Promotion to Alpha Ethniki
4	PAS Giannina	34	15	8	11	42	39	+3	38	Qualification for Promotion play-off
5	Korinthos	34	13	10	11	48	40	+8	36	Qualification for Promotion play-off
6	Veria	34	14	8	12	49	45	+4	36	Qualification for Promotion play-off
7	Kastoria	34	12	10	12	33	39	−6	34	
8	Makedonikos	34	12	10	12	34	41	−7	34	
9	Charavgiakos	34	13	8	13	40	38	+2	34	
10	Naoussa	34	12	9	13	47	49	−2	33	
11	Athinaikos	34	14	5	15	35	41	−6	33	
12	Atromitos	34	10	13	11	43	43	0	33	
13	Niki Volos	34	12	9	13	37	37	0	33	
14	Rethymniakos	34	11	10	13	36	44	−8	32	
15	Pierikos	34	13	6	15	52	47	+5	32	
16	Panachaiki (O)	34	12	8	14	44	47	−3	32	Qualification for Relegation play-off
17	Kallithea (O)	34	6	12	16	36	54	−18	24	Qualification for Relegation play-off
18	Kavala (R)	34	7	9	18	37	56	−19	23	Qualification for Relegation play-off

(C) Champions; (O) Play-off winners; (P) Promoted; (R) Relegated

== Results ==
Home \ Away	ATH	ATR	CHV	ION	KLT	KAS	KAV	KOR	MAK	NAO	NVL	PCK	PSE	PAS	PIE	RTY	VER	XAN
Athinaikos		3–1	0–3	1–0	2–0	1–0	5–0	2–1	0–1	0–1	2–0	2–1	1–1	0–2	1–0	3–1	1–0	1–0
Atromitos	0–0		3–1	1–1	3–1	2–0	1–0	1–1	0–0	1–1	2–0	2–0	0–2	2–1	1–0	5–0	1–3	0–0
Charavgiakos	3–1	1–1		0–0	5–2	0–2	2–0	2–1	1–0	1–0	3–0	3–1	0–0	3–0	3–1	1–1	2–0	1–0
Ionikos	3–1	1–0	1–0		1–0	1–1	3–2	1–0	2–0	2–1	1–1	3–1	3–1	3–0	3–0	1–1	3–1	0–0
Kallithea	1–2	1–2	1–1	3–4		0–0	1–0	1–1	1–1	0–1	1–0	1–0	2–1	1–2	2–1	1–1	1–1	2–2
Kastoria	1–0	3–1	0–0	1–2	2–1		4–1	1–3	1–1	0–2	0–0	1–0	1–1	3–1	2–0	1–0	1–1	4–0
Kavala	1–0	2–0	2–0	0–2	2–3	1–1		1–1	1–1	2–0	0–1	2–2	2–2	3–0	2–5	2–1	2–2	1–2
Korinthos	2–0	2–1	3–0	4–0	0–0	0–0	1–0		2–2	2–2	2–1	1–0	0–1	2–1	3–1	4–0	3–0	1–2
Makedonikos	1–0	2–1	2–0	2–0	1–1	0–0	1–0	1–1		2–0	1–0	1–0	1–0	0–0	2–1	2–1	0–2	2–4
Naoussa	3–1	2–2	2–1	4–0	0–2	6–0	0–0	1–0	4–2		2–0	3–0	1–1	0–3	2–2	1–2	0–0	3–2
Niki Volos	1–1	0–0	1–0	1–1	3–1	1–0	2–1	1–0	3–0	6–0		4–0	1–1	1–1	1–3	0–0	2–0	1–0
Panachaiki	0–0	2–2	4–1	2–1	3–2	0–0	3–2	3–1	2–0	2–1	2–1		1–1	3–2	1–1	3–0	2–0	0–0
Panserraikos	0–1	4–1	3–0	3–1	0–0	4–1	0–0	2–0	3–2	1–0	4–1	0–2		0–0	2–0	2–1	2–1	2–1
PAS Giannina	1–0	2–2	1–1	2–0	0–0	2–0	2–1	3–1	2–1	1–0	2–0	1–0	3–0		2–0	2–2	0–0	2–1
Pierikos	3–0	2–2	2–0	2–1	4–1	1–0	4–1	2–2	1–1	4–1	2–0	2–0	2–2	1–0		0–1	5–1	0–3
Rethymniakos	1–1	3–1	0–0	1–0	2–1	0–1	0–1	0–1	4–0	1–1	3–1	2–1	0–0	3–0	1–0		2–0	1–1
Veria	5–2	1–1	1–0	3–0	3–1	3–0	1–0	2–2	2–1	4–0	0–1	2–1	0–0	3–1	1–0	4–0		1–2
Xanthi	3–0	1–0	1–1	1–1	2–0	3–0	3–1	5–0	1–0	2–2	1–1	2–2	3–2	2–0	2–0	2–0	6–1	

Legend: Blue = home team win; Yellow = draw; Red = away team win.

== Promotion play-off ==
Pos	Team	Pld	W	D	L	GF	GA	GD	Pts	Qualification or relegation
1	Ethnikos Piraeus	5	5	0	0	9	2	+7	10	Qualified to Alpha Ethniki
2	Apollon Kalamarias	5	3	1	1	5	2	+3	7	Qualified to Alpha Ethniki
3	PAS Giannina	5	2	0	3	5	6	−1	4	Qualified to Beta Ethniki
4	Korinthos	5	1	1	3	7	9	−2	3	Qualified to Beta Ethniki
5	Diagoras (R)	5	1	1	3	5	9	−4	3	Qualified to Beta Ethniki
6	Veria	5	1	1	3	5	8	−3	3	Qualified to Beta Ethniki

Source: rsssf.org
(R) Relegated

== Relegation play-off ==
Pos	Team	Pld	W	D	L	GF	GA	GD	Pts	Qualification or relegation
1	Kallithea	5	?	?	?	5	2	+3	8	Qualified to Beta Ethniki
2	Panachaiki	5	?	?	?	8	3	+5	6	Qualified to Beta Ethniki
3	Kavala	5	?	?	?	4	4	0	6	Qualified to Gamma Ethniki
4	Kozani	5	?	?	?	5	3	+2	5	Qualified to Gamma Ethniki
5	Anagennisi Arta	5	?	?	?	4	6	−2	4	Qualified to Gamma Ethniki
6	Irodotos	5	?	?	?	3	11	−8	1	Qualified to Gamma Ethniki

Source: rsssf.org

== Top scorers ==
Rank	Player	Club	Goals
1	(Greece) Achilleas Adamopoulos	Xanthi	30
2	(Greece) Giorgos Keramidas	PAS Giannina	17
3	(Bulgaria) Boycho Velichkov	Panserraikos	15
3	(Greece) Vaggelis Kalogeropulos	Panserraikos	15
5	(Greece) Athanasios Basbanas	Pierikos	14
