= 1993–94 Beta Ethniki =

Beta Ethniki
- Season: 1993–94
- Dates: 2 September 1993 – 5 June 1994
- Champions: Ionikos
- Promoted: Ionikos; Kavala; Ethnikos Piraeus
- Relegated: Atromitos; Olympiacos Volos; Anagennisi Giannitsa; Kallithea

Beta Ethniki 1993–94 complete season.

== League table ==
Location of teams in 1993–94 Beta Ethniki

Pos	Team	Pld	W	D	L	GF	GA	GD	Pts	Promotion or relegation
1	Ionikos (C, P)	34	18	13	3	53	21	+32	67	Promotion to Alpha Ethniki
2	Kavala (P)	34	18	10	6	40	21	+19	64	Promotion to Alpha Ethniki
3	Ethnikos Piraeus (P)	34	17	10	7	43	24	+19	61	Promotion to Alpha Ethniki
4	Rethymniakos	34	17	7	10	54	36	+18	58	
5	PAS Giannina	34	16	8	10	66	43	+23	56	
6	Anagennisi Karditsa	34	15	8	11	49	41	+8	53	
7	Kalamata	34	15	6	13	44	48	−4	51	
8	Panargiakos	34	14	5	15	44	41	+3	47	
9	Veria	34	11	12	11	36	34	+2	45	
10	Proodeftiki	34	11	11	12	41	52	−11	44	
11	Pierikos	34	11	10	13	39	37	+2	43	
12	Pontioi Veria	34	10	11	13	41	45	−4	41	
13	Korinthos	34	10	10	14	41	50	−9	40	
14	Charavgiakos	34	10	9	15	24	44	−20	39	
15	Atromitos (R)	34	9	11	14	31	41	−10	38	Relegation to Gamma Ethniki
16	Olympiacos Volos (R)	34	9	7	18	40	53	−13	34	Relegation to Gamma Ethniki
17	Anagennisi Giannitsa (R)	34	7	10	17	32	49	−17	31	Relegation to Gamma Ethniki
18	Kallithea (R)	34	6	6	22	33	71	−38	24	Relegation to Gamma Ethniki

(C) Champions; (P) Promoted; (R) Relegated

== Results ==
Home \ Away	ANG	KRD	ATR	CHV	ETH	ION	KAL	KLT	KAV	KOR	EOV	PRG	PAS	PIE	PVR	PRO	RTY	VER
Anagennisi Giannitsa		3–3	1–1	1–2	0–1	0–1	0–0	3–0	0–0	0–1	2–0	2–3	2–1	0–2	2–1	2–1	0–0	5–2
Anagennisi Karditsa	1–3		3–0	3–0	1–0	1–3	2–0	1–2	2–1	2–2	3–2	1–0	1–0	3–3	1–0	4–0	2–1	2–0
Atromitos	0–0	1–1		2–0	2–1	0–3	0–0	6–2	1–0	1–0	4–1	1–0	0–0	0–0	2–0	1–1	0–1	2–0
Charavgiakos	1–0	0–1	1–0		0–1	0–0	0–0	2–1	0–1	2–1	1–1	2–1	0–7	1–0	1–0	0–1	0–0	1–0
Ethnikos Piraeus	1–0	2–0	2–0	1–0		1–1	4–0	3–1	2–1	2–0	3–0	2–0	1–1	2–0	2–1	2–0	1–0	0–0
Ionikos	5–0	1–0	2–0	1–0	1–1		2–0	2–1	0–0	4–0	0–0	4–2	1–0	4–1	0–1	0–0	1–1	2–1
Kalamata	2–0	4–1	2–1	3–2	1–0	1–1		1–0	2–0	2–2	4–1	4–0	4–0	1–0	2–1	1–0	2–1	2–0
Kallithea	2–2	1–0	1–1	2–2	1–3	1–3	3–1		0–2	0–3	2–1	1–0	1–1	0–2	1–0	2–3	2–3	0–0
Kavala	3–2	1–0	2–1	2–1	1–0	2–1	1–1	2–0		1–0	2–1	4–0	1–0	2–0	0–0	0–0	2–0	1–0
Korinthos	3–1	1–1	0–0	1–1	0–0	2–2	3–0	2–1	0–1		1–0	2–1	2–2	2–1	4–2	3–2	0–0	1–4
Olympiacos Volos	1–0	3–1	0–0	4–0	1–1	1–3	3–1	1–0	0–0	1–0		0–1	1–1	1–0	0–0	6–2	1–2	1–3
Panargiakos	0–0	0–1	3–1	0–0	3–0	0–1	4–1	1–1	2–1	1–0	2–0		4–1	2–0	2–0	5–0	2–0	1–1
PAS Giannina	0–0	2–1	4–1	1–0	1–0	1–1	5–0	5–1	2–0	4–1	5–3	3–1		1–2	6–3	2–0	3–1	3–1
Pierikos	3–1	1–3	2–1	1–1	3–0	1–1	2–0	3–0	0–0	1–1	2–1	0–1	3–0		1–1	2–0	1–1	1–1
Pontioi Veria	2–0	3–3	1–0	4–1	0–0	0–1	3–1	3–0	1–1	2–0	2–1	2–2	0–2	1–1		1–1	1–0	0–3
Proodeftiki	3–0	1–0	1–0	1–1	1–1	0–0	2–1	3–0	1–1	2–1	2–3	1–0	1–1	2–0	3–3		2–3	1–0
Rethymniakos	3–0	0–0	5–0	2–0	2–2	1–0	3–0	5–3	0–3	4–2	2–0	2–0	3–1	1–0	0–1	4–1		1–0
Veria	0–0	0–0	1–1	0–1	1–1	1–1	1–0	1–0	1–1	2–0	1–0	2–0	2–0	1–0	1–1	2–2	3–2	

Legend: Blue = home team win; Yellow = draw; Red = away team win.

== Top scorers ==
Rank	Player	Club	Goals
1	(Federal Republic of Yugoslavia) Zdenko Muf	PAS Giannina	29
2	(Federal Republic of Yugoslavia) Predrag Mitić	Rethymniakos	17
3	(Albania) Arjan Bellaj	PAS Giannina	15
4	(Federal Republic of Yugoslavia) Arsen Mihajlović	Anagennisi Giannitsa	13
5	(Albania) Viktor Paço	Proodeftiki	12
5	(Slovenia) Janez Pate	Pierikos	12
5	(Federal Republic of Yugoslavia) Radovan Krstović	Olympiacos Volos	12
5	(Federal Republic of Yugoslavia) Dušan Jovanović	Pontioi Veria	12
