= 1989–90 Gamma Ethniki =

Gamma Ethniki
- Season: 1989–90
- Champions: Panargiakos (South); Anagennisi Giannitsa (North)
- Promoted: Panargiakos; Proodeftiki; Anagennisi Giannitsa; Kavala
- Relegated: Kerkyra; Anagennisi Arta; Rodos; Chalkida; Achaiki; Apollon Larissa; Alexandreia; Agrotikos Asteras; Achilleas Farsala; Aiginiakos

The 1989–90 Gamma Ethniki was the seventh season since the official establishment of the third tier of Greek football in 1983. Panargiakos and Anagennisi Giannitsa were crowned champions in Southern and Northern Group respectively, thus winning promotion to Beta Ethniki. Proodeftiki and Kavala also won promotion as a runners-up of the groups.

Kerkyra, Anagennisi Arta, Rodos, Chalkida, Achaiki, Apollon Larissa, Alexandreia, Agrotikos Asteras, Achilleas Farsala and Aiginiakos were relegated to Delta Ethniki.

== Southern Group ==
=== League table ===
Pos	Team	Pld	W	D	L	GF	GA	GD	Pts	Promotion or relegation
1	Panargiakos (C, P)	38	22	9	7	65	28	+37	53	Promotion to Beta Ethniki
2	Proodeftiki (P)	38	21	11	6	52	30	+22	53	Promotion to Beta Ethniki
3	Ilisiakos	38	19	11	8	42	22	+20	49	
4	Egaleo	38	17	8	13	54	40	+14	42	
5	Doxa Vyronas	38	14	14	10	34	27	+7	42	
6	Panelefsiniakos	38	16	9	13	40	38	+2	41	
7	Kalamata	38	12	16	10	45	40	+5	40	
8	Panetolikos	38	14	10	14	45	40	+5	38	
9	Messolonghi	38	13	11	14	46	41	+5	37	
10	Irodotos	38	13	11	14	45	45	0	37	
11	Olympiakos Loutraki	38	12	13	13	40	40	0	37	
12	Acharnaikos	38	16	5	17	46	54	−8	37	
13	Thriamvos	38	12	12	14	37	45	−8	36	
14	Ethnikos Asteras	38	11	13	14	37	42	−5	35	
15	Panarkadikos	38	12	10	16	40	48	−8	34	
16	Kerkyra (R)	38	12	10	16	37	41	−4	34	Relegation to Delta Ethniki
17	Anagennisi Arta (R)	38	11	11	16	41	50	−9	33	Relegation to Delta Ethniki
18	Rodos (R)	38	11	10	17	31	45	−14	32	Relegation to Delta Ethniki
19	Chalkida (R)	38	6	17	15	34	62	−28	29	Relegation to Delta Ethniki
20	Achaiki (Note: Achaiki had 2 points deducted.) (R)	38	7	7	24	31	64	−33	19	Relegation to Delta Ethniki

(C) Champions; (P) Promoted; (R) Relegated

== Northern Group ==
=== League table ===
Pos	Team	Pld	W	D	L	GF	GA	GD	Pts	Promotion or relegation
1	Anagennisi Giannitsa (C, P)	38	20	13	5	53	22	+31	53	Promotion to Beta Ethniki
2	Kavala (P)	38	20	7	11	58	35	+23	47	Promotion to Beta Ethniki
3	Kozani	38	17	12	9	44	27	+17	46	
4	Neoi Epivates	38	17	9	12	49	43	+6	43	
5	Odysseas Kordelio	38	15	12	11	49	33	+16	42	
6	Anagennisi Karditsa	38	16	10	12	43	42	+1	42	
7	Asteras Ambelokipoi	38	17	7	14	47	42	+5	41	
8	Pontioi Veria	38	14	12	12	52	49	+3	40	
9	Anagennisi Kolindros	38	14	11	13	44	40	+4	39	
10	Nigrita	38	15	8	15	41	50	−9	38	
11	Trikala	38	12	12	14	27	33	−6	36	
12	Kilkisiakos	38	13	10	15	37	38	−1	36	
13	Anagennisi Neapoli	38	12	12	14	30	37	−7	36	
14	Preveza	38	13	10	15	32	35	−3	36	
15	Kyriakiou	38	15	6	17	46	47	−1	36	
16	Apollon Larissa (R)	38	9	16	13	34	34	0	34	Relegation to Delta Ethniki
17	Alexandreia (R)	38	11	8	19	40	50	−10	30	Relegation to Delta Ethniki
18	Agrotikos Asteras (R)	38	11	8	19	27	53	−26	30	Relegation to Delta Ethniki
19	Achilleas Farsala (R)	38	10	8	20	36	61	−25	28	Relegation to Delta Ethniki
20	Aiginiakos (R)	38	7	13	18	34	52	−18	27	Relegation to Delta Ethniki

(C) Champions; (P) Promoted; (R) Relegated
