= 1996–97 Beta Ethniki =

Beta Ethniki
- Season: 1996–97
- Dates: 28 September 1996 – 1 June 1997
- Champions: Panionios
- Promoted: Panionios; Proodeftiki; Ethnikos Piraeus
- Relegated: Rethymniakos; PAS Giannina; Naoussa; Pyrgos

Beta Ethniki 1996–97 complete season.

== League table ==
Location of teams in 1996–97 Beta Ethniki

Pos	Team	Pld	W	D	L	GF	GA	GD	Pts	Promotion or relegation
1	Panionios (C, P)	34	19	10	5	57	21	+36	67	Promotion to Alpha Ethniki
2	Proodeftiki (P)	34	20	5	9	56	33	+23	65	Promotion to Alpha Ethniki
3	Ethnikos Piraeus (P)	34	18	10	6	46	22	+24	64	Promotion to Alpha Ethniki
4	Panetolikos	34	17	11	6	53	30	+23	62	
5	Panargiakos	34	18	4	12	39	37	+2	58	
6	AEL	34	15	10	9	44	32	+12	55	
7	Niki Volos	34	16	7	11	51	34	+17	55	
8	Trikala	34	17	1	16	46	45	+1	52	
9	Doxa Vyronas	34	16	4	14	47	34	+13	52	
10	Apollon Kalamarias	34	14	7	13	47	44	+3	49	
11	Levadiakos	34	14	6	14	46	41	+5	48	
12	Panelefsiniakos	34	13	8	13	46	33	+13	47	
13	Doxa Drama	34	10	10	14	46	48	−2	40	
14	Panserraikos	34	10	8	16	29	41	−12	38	
15	Rethymniakos (R)	34	9	7	18	39	52	−13	34	Relegation to Gamma Ethniki
16	PAS Giannina (R)	34	7	7	20	32	55	−23	28	Relegation to Gamma Ethniki
17	Naoussa (R)	34	6	7	21	29	53	−24	25	Relegation to Gamma Ethniki
18	Pyrgos (Note: Pyrgos were played with an amateur team in the second half of season due to financial problems.) (R)	34	5	2	27	18	116	−98	17	Withdraw

(C) Champions; (P) Promoted; (R) Relegated

== Results ==
Home \ Away	AEL	APK	DOX	DXV	ETH	LEV	NAO	NVL	PNT	PNF	PRG	PGSS	PSE	PAS	PRO	PYR	RTY	TRI
AEL		5–2	0–0	1–0	0–0	4–0	0–0	1–1	1–1	1–0	1–0	0–2	3–0	3–0	1–2	2–1	3–1	0–1
Apollon Kalamarias	1–1		3–0	2–0	3–1	1–0	1–0	3–4	1–1	1–1	5–1	0–2	0–0	2–1	3–1	4–0	1–0	1–0
Doxa Drama	2–0	0–1		0–0	0–0	2–1	2–0	2–2	1–1	1–1	0–0	2–2	1–0	2–0	0–2	1–2	1–1	4–1
Doxa Vyronas	0–2	2–1	2–0		1–0	2–3	2–0	1–0	2–1	2–1	1–1	1–1	2–1	1–0	0–1	6–0	1–0	1–1
Ethnikos Piraeus	1–1	2–0	3–1	3–2		2–0	3–0	0–0	2–2	1–1	3–0	1–2	2–0	1–1	1–0	4–0	2–1	1–0
Levadiakos	2–1	0–1	1–1	2–1	0–2		2–0	0–0	0–0	5–1	2–1	1–1	2–0	2–0	1–1	7–0	1–0	2–1
Naoussa	0–1	1–0	0–2	0–1	1–1	0–0		1–0	2–4	3–2	0–1	0–2	2–0	1–1	1–0	5–0	2–2	2–3
Niki Volos	1–2	3–2	2–1	2–0	2–0	5–1	1–0		3–0	0–0	1–1	0–0	2–0	2–1	3–2	8–0	2–0	1–0
Panetolikos	2–0	4–0	5–0	1–0	0–0	1–0	2–0	1–0		3–0	2–0	1–0	1–2	2–1	1–1	3–0	2–2	1–0
Panelefsiniakos	1–1	3–0	3–0	1–0	2–0	4–1	3–0	3–0	0–0		1–0	1–0	1–0	1–2	1–2	4–1	6–0	4–0
Panargiakos	3–0	1–1	3–2	2–1	0–1	0–1	3–2	2–0	2–0	2–0		1–0	1–0	1–0	2–1	2–0	2–0	2–0
Panionios	3–0	4–2	2–1	1–0	0–1	2–1	0–0	2–0	1–0	1–0	0–1		0–0	3–0	2–1	7–1	4–0	2–0
Panserraikos	1–1	0–2	0–5	2–4	0–1	1–0	0–0	1–3	1–1	1–0	3–0	0–0		0–0	4–0	3–0	0–0	3–0
PAS Giannina	1–2	3–2	2–4	0–2	0–0	1–2	1–0	1–2	2–4	0–0	2–0	1–1	1–3		0–4	4–0	1–0	1–2
Proodeftiki	1–0	1–0	2–1	1–0	2–0	2–1	4–2	2–0	0–1	0–0	3–0	0–0	4–1	1–1		3–1	1–0	2–1
Pyrgos	1–4	0–0	1–4	0–7	0–4	0–5	2–1	1–0	1–1	1–0	0–1	1–6	0–1	1–2	0–6		2–1	1–3
Rethymniakos	1–1	1–1	3–2	1–2	0–2	1–0	2–1	1–0	4–1	3–0	1–2	2–2	2–0	2–1	0–1	5–0		2–3
Trikala	0–1	1–0	2–1	2–0	0–1	2–0	5–2	2–1	1–3	1–0	3–1	1–2	0–1	2–0	4–2	2–0 (Note: Match awarded.)	2–0	

Legend: Blue = home team win; Yellow = draw; Red = away team win.

== Top scorers ==
Rank	Player	Club	Goals
1	(Greece) Giannis Paflias	Niki Volos	18
2	(Greece) Sakis Almanidis	Proodeftiki	16
3	(Greece) Michalis Klokidis	Levadiakos	15
4	(Brazil) Ademar	Panserraikos	13
4	(Greece) Thanasis Giannakidis	Niki Volos	13
