= 1995–96 Beta Ethniki =

Beta Ethniki
- Season: 1995–96
- Dates: 3 September 1995 – 26 May 1996
- Champions: Kavala
- Promoted: Kavala; Veria; Kastoria
- Relegated: Ialysos; Anagennisi Kolindros; Anagennisi Karditsa; Pierikos

Beta Ethniki 1995–96 complete season.

== League table ==
Location of teams in 1995–96 Beta Ethniki

Pos	Team	Pld	W	D	L	GF	GA	GD	Pts	Promotion or relegation
1	Kavala (C, P)	34	21	7	6	58	18	+40	70	Promotion to Alpha Ethniki
2	Veria (P)	34	18	9	7	56	35	+21	63	Promotion to Alpha Ethniki
3	Kastoria (P)	34	16	7	11	44	38	+6	55	Promotion to Alpha Ethniki
4	Proodeftiki	34	15	9	10	50	34	+16	54	
5	Levadiakos	34	14	10	10	36	33	+3	52	
6	Doxa Drama	34	15	7	12	38	32	+6	52	
7	Doxa Vyronas	34	14	7	13	45	47	−2	49	
8	Apollon Kalamarias	34	14	7	13	46	40	+6	49	
9	Rethymniakos	34	13	8	13	34	32	+2	47	
10	Trikala	34	12	11	11	40	39	+1	47	
11	Naoussa	34	13	8	13	32	34	−2	47	
12	PAS Giannina	34	12	10	12	41	39	+2	46	
13	Panelefsiniakos	34	11	13	10	39	36	+3	46	
14	Panargiakos	34	12	9	13	30	33	−3	45	
15	Ialysos (R)	34	12	8	14	46	50	−4	44	Relegation to Gamma Ethniki
16	Anagennisi Kolindros (R)	34	10	6	18	28	37	−9	36	Relegation to Gamma Ethniki
17	Anagennisi Karditsa (R)	34	6	6	22	30	73	−43	24	Relegation to Gamma Ethniki
18	Pierikos (R)	34	3	8	23	17	60	−43	17	Relegation to Gamma Ethniki

(C) Champions; (P) Promoted; (R) Relegated

== Results ==
Home \ Away	KRD	AKL	APL	DOX	DXV	IAL	KAS	KAV	LEV	NAO	PRG	PNF	PAS	PIE	PRO	RTY	TRI	VER
Anagennisi Karditsa		0–0	2–1	2–1	1–1	2–1	1–2	0–6	1–2	1–3	0–2	0–1	1–1	2–0	2–1	0–1	2–1	0–1
Anagennisi Kolindros	2–1		2–0	0–1	3–1	4–1	0–1	0–3	1–0	0–1	1–0	1–1	3–1	1–0	1–0	0–1	1–0	0–2
Apollon Kalamarias	1–1	1–0		0–1	4–3	1–1	0–0	0–0	0–1	1–0	2–0	2–0	1–1	4–2	1–0	1–0	5–0	3–1
Doxa Drama	4–1	2–1	0–4		1–1	4–0	0–0	2–1	0–1	3–1	1–1	3–1	1–0	2–0	3–0	2–0	0–0	1–0
Doxa Vyronas	3–0	1–0	3–1	2–1		2–1	1–0	1–4	2–2	2–0	1–0	1–1	1–0	4–1	0–1	2–0	3–1	3–3
Ialysos	2–1	3–1	4–1	0–1	3–1		4–0	0–0	0–1	1–0	2–0	1–1	5–2	2–0	1–0	1–1	2–2	1–0
Kastoria	3–1	2–1	3–1	1–0	3–1	3–0		0–1	2–0	1–1	1–0	1–2	3–1	4–1	1–2	2–0	1–1	1–2
Kavala	3–0	1–1	2–0	3–0	2–0	3–0	2–0		2–0	1–0	1–0	2–0	3–1	2–1	3–1	0–0	2–0	1–0
Levadiakos	3–1	2–1	0–2	2–1	1–1	2–1	0–0	2–1		2–0	1–1	4–0	2–0	1–0	1–0	0–2	0–0	1–1
Naoussa	0–0	1–0	1–1	1–2	1–0	1–0	2–0	1–3	0–0		2–0	0–0	2–1	2–0	2–1	1–0	1–1	2–2
Panargiakos	2–1	0–0	1–1	1–0	4–1	2–0	1–3	2–1	1–0	0–2		2–0	1–0	0–0	0–1	2–1	2–0	1–0
Panelefsiniakos	4–0	2–2	2–1	0–0	0–1	3–1	1–1	1–1	0–0	4–0	1–0		0–0	4–0	4–1	1–1	0–3	3–0
PAS Giannina	1–0	3–0	1–0	0–0	3–1	1–1	0–0	1–0	2–0	2–1	3–3	3–0		4–0	0–2	2–0	1–0	1–1
Pierikos	1–0	1–0	2–3	0–0	1–2	1–2	0–1	0–2	1–1	0–2	0–0	1–1	0–1		0–0	1–0	0–0	1–3
Proodeftiki	11–3	0–0	1–0	2–1	1–0	2–2	5–1	1–0	2–1	1–0	1–1	2–0	1–1	3–0		1–1	3–0	1–1
Rethymniakos	4–0	1–0	2–3	2–0	1–0	1–1	0–1	1–0	3–0	2–1	0–0	0–1	2–0	1–1	0–0		1–0	5–4
Trikala	1–1	2–1	1–0	1–0	1–0	4–2	3–1	0–0	2–2	0–0	2–0	1–0	3–2	4–0	2–2	3–0		1–2
Veria	3–2	1–0	2–0	3–0	1–1	2–0	3–1	2–2	2–1	2–0	3–0	0–0	1–1	4–1	1–0	1–0	2–0	

Legend: Blue = home team win; Yellow = draw; Red = away team win.

== Top scorers ==
Rank	Player	Club	Goals
1	(Syria) Mohammad Afash	Proodeftiki	17
2	(Federal Republic of Yugoslavia) Radovan Marković	Panelefsiniakos	15
2	(Greece) Marios Sengos	Ialysos	15
4	(Greece) Thomas Kyparissis	Panelefsiniakos	14
5	(Greece) Thanasis Giannakidis	Apollon Kalamarias	12
5	(Federal Republic of Yugoslavia) Željko Simović	PAS Giannina / Kavala	12
7	(Greece) Simos Vatamidis	Doxa Vyronas	11
7	(Greece) Aris Karsavvidis	Trikala	11
7	(Greece) Dimitris Moustakas	Doxa Vyronas	11
7	(Federal Republic of Yugoslavia) Miloje Petković	Veria	11
