= 1987–88 Gamma Ethniki =

Gamma Ethniki
- Season: 1987–88
- Champions: Atromitos (South); Makedonikos (North)
- Promoted: Atromitos; Rethymniakos; Makedonikos; Niki Volos
- Relegated: Panargiakos; Kerkyra; Rodos; Ergotelis; Aiolikos; Aris Nikaia; Achaiki; Messiniakos; Agrotikos Asteras; Lamia; Panetolikos; Polykastro; Olympiakos Chalkida; Ethnikos Alexandroupoli; Anagennisi Neapoli; Pandramaikos; Anagennisi Kolindros; Alexandreia; Nestos Chrysoupoli

The 1987–88 Gamma Ethniki was the fifth season since the official establishment of the third tier of Greek football in 1983. Atromitos and Makedonikos were crowned champions in Southern and Northern Group respectively, thus winning promotion to Beta Ethniki. Rethymniakos and Niki Volos also won promotion as a runners-up of the groups.

Panargiakos, Kerkyra, Rodos, Ergotelis, Aiolikos Aris Nikaia, Achaiki, Messiniakos, Agrotikos Asteras, Lamia, Panetolikos, Polykastro, Olympiakos Chalkida, Ethnikos Alexandroupoli, Anagennisi Neapoli, Pandramaikos, Anagennisi Kolindros, Alexandreia and Nestos Chrysoupoli were relegated to Delta Ethniki.

== Southern Group ==
=== League table ===
Pos	Team	Pld	W	D	L	GF	GA	GD	Pts	Promotion or relegation
1	Atromitos (C, P)	34	21	6	7	43	24	+19	48	Promotion to Beta Ethniki
2	Rethymniakos (P)	34	19	9	6	66	43	+23	47	Promotion to Beta Ethniki
3	Irodotos	34	18	11	5	46	21	+25	47	
4	Kalamata	34	16	8	10	43	40	+3	40	
5	Proodeftiki	34	16	7	11	50	38	+12	39	
6	Egaleo (Note: Egaleo had 2 points deducted.)	34	19	3	12	54	44	+10	39	
7	Panarkadikos	34	15	9	10	53	44	+9	39	
8	Pannafpliakos (R)	34	14	10	10	44	36	+8	38	Relegation to Delta Ethniki
9	Panelefsiniakos (R)	34	15	8	11	38	35	+3	38	Relegation to Delta Ethniki
10	Ethnikos Asteras (R)	34	14	9	11	39	36	+3	37	Relegation to Delta Ethniki
11	Panargiakos (R)	34	14	8	12	54	40	+14	36	Relegation to Delta Ethniki
12	Kerkyra (R)	34	10	10	14	38	41	−3	30	Relegation to Delta Ethniki
13	Rodos (R)	34	10	7	17	25	42	−17	27	Relegation to Delta Ethniki
14	Ergotelis (R)	34	10	3	21	35	54	−19	23	Relegation to Delta Ethniki
15	Aiolikos (R)	34	9	5	20	31	55	−24	23	Relegation to Delta Ethniki
16	Aris Nikaia (R)	34	7	7	20	31	55	−24	21	Relegation to Delta Ethniki
17	Achaiki (R)	34	6	8	20	35	64	−29	20	Relegation to Delta Ethniki
18	Messiniakos (R)	34	5	8	21	26	51	−25	18	Relegation to Delta Ethniki

(C) Champions; (P) Promoted; (R) Relegated

== Northern Group ==
=== League table ===
Pos	Team	Pld	W	D	L	GF	GA	GD	Pts	Promotion or relegation
1	Makedonikos (C, P)	34	21	7	6	48	24	+24	49	Promotion to Beta Ethniki
2	Niki Volos (P)	34	19	6	9	39	29	+10	44	Promotion to Beta Ethniki
3	Kozani	34	15	11	8	48	37	+11	41	
4	Anagennisi Karditsa (Note: Anagennisi Karditsa and Eordaikos had 1 point deducted.)	34	17	7	10	48	35	+13	40	
5	Eordaikos	34	16	9	9	33	21	+12	40	
6	Anagennisi Arta	34	16	7	11	41	31	+10	39	
7	Kilkisiakos	34	13	12	9	34	25	+9	38	
8	Agrotikos Asteras (R)	34	15	8	11	44	38	+6	38	Relegation to Delta Ethniki
9	Lamia (R)	34	15	7	12	45	36	+9	37	Relegation to Delta Ethniki
10	Panetolikos (Note: Panetolikos had 4 points deducted.) (R)	34	15	9	10	46	32	+14	35	Relegation to Delta Ethniki
11	Polykastro (R)	34	11	9	14	35	43	−8	31	Relegation to Delta Ethniki
12	Olympiakos Chalkida (R)	34	13	5	16	23	33	−10	31	Relegation to Delta Ethniki
13	Ethnikos Alexandroupoli (R)	34	13	4	17	34	38	−4	30	Relegation to Delta Ethniki
14	Anagennisi Neapoli (R)	34	9	10	15	33	41	−8	28	Relegation to Delta Ethniki
15	Pandramaikos (R)	34	9	9	16	37	52	−15	27	Relegation to Delta Ethniki
16	Anagennisi Kolindros (R)	34	6	9	19	32	53	−21	21	Relegation to Delta Ethniki
17	Alexandreia (R)	34	7	7	20	31	51	−20	21	Relegation to Delta Ethniki
18	Nestos Chrysoupoli (R)	34	3	10	21	33	75	−42	16	Relegation to Delta Ethniki

(C) Champions; (P) Promoted; (R) Relegated
