= 1990–91 Gamma Ethniki =

Gamma Ethniki
- Season: 1990–91
- Champions: Doxa Vyronas (South); Naoussa (North)
- Promoted: Doxa Vyronas; Egaleo; Naoussa; Trikala
- Relegated: Olympiakos Loutraki; Ethnikos Asteras; Irodotos; Acharnaikos; Panarkadikos; Lamia; Odysseas Kordelio; Anagennisi Karditsa; Aspida Xanthi; Kilkisiakos

The 1990–91 Gamma Ethniki was the eighth season since the official establishment of the third tier of Greek football in 1983. Doxa Vyronas and Naoussa were crowned champions in Southern and Northern Group respectively, thus winning promotion to Beta Ethniki. Egaleo and Trikala also won promotion as a runners-up of the groups.

Olympiakos Loutraki, Ethnikos Asteras, Irodotos, Acharnaikos, Panarkadikos, Lamia, Odysseas Kordelio, Anagennisi Karditsa, Aspida Xanthi and Kilkisiakos were relegated to Delta Ethniki.

== Southern Group ==
=== League table ===
Pos	Team	Pld	W	D	L	GF	GA	GD	Pts	Promotion or relegation
1	Doxa Vyronas (C, P)	34	19	9	6	54	28	+26	47	Promotion to Beta Ethniki
2	Egaleo (P)	34	15	15	4	40	24	+16	45	Promotion to Beta Ethniki
3	Kalamata	34	19	4	11	46	27	+19	42	
4	Ilisiakos	34	16	8	10	38	32	+6	40	
5	Panetolikos	34	13	11	10	32	28	+4	37	
6	Sparti	34	14	9	11	34	26	+8	37	
7	Kallithea	34	14	8	12	30	31	−1	36	
8	Panelefsiniakos	34	12	11	11	37	30	+7	35	
9	Paniliakos	34	11	12	11	37	31	+6	34	
10	Chaidari	34	13	7	14	32	30	+2	33	
11	Thriamvos	34	11	11	12	37	40	−3	33	
12	Aris Nikaia	34	11	10	13	34	36	−2	32	
13	Messolonghi	34	10	12	12	28	33	−5	32	
14	Olympiakos Loutraki (R)	34	12	8	14	37	37	0	32	Relegation to Delta Ethniki
15	Ethnikos Asteras (R)	34	11	6	17	27	35	−8	28	Relegation to Delta Ethniki
16	Irodotos (R)	34	10	8	16	27	32	−5	28	Relegation to Delta Ethniki
17	Acharnaikos (R)	34	7	10	17	24	51	−27	24	Relegation to Delta Ethniki
18	Panarkadikos (R)	34	6	5	23	21	54	−33	17	Relegation to Delta Ethniki

(C) Champions; (P) Promoted; (R) Relegated

== Northern Group ==
=== League table ===
Pos	Team	Pld	W	D	L	GF	GA	GD	Pts	Promotion or relegation
1	Naoussa (C, P)	34	16	13	5	58	32	+26	45	Promotion to Beta Ethniki
2	Trikala (P)	34	16	10	8	40	27	+13	42	Promotion to Beta Ethniki
3	Anagennisi Kolindros	34	14	11	9	41	28	+13	39	
4	Kozani	34	12	12	10	38	35	+3	36	
5	Asteras Ambelokipoi	34	11	12	11	36	27	+9	34	
6	Nigrita	34	13	8	13	48	46	+2	34	
7	Anagennisi Neapoli	34	11	12	11	35	36	−1	34	
8	Neoi Epivates	34	11	12	11	27	28	−1	34	
9	Pontioi Veria	34	13	8	13	32	35	−3	34	
10	Preveza	34	13	8	13	41	45	−4	34	
11	Anagennisi Chalkidona	34	11	12	11	37	42	−5	34	
12	Kyriakiou	34	12	10	12	37	44	−7	34	
13	Niki Volos	34	12	9	13	49	41	+8	33	
14	Lamia (R)	34	13	7	14	38	42	−4	33	Relegation to Delta Ethniki
15	Odysseas Kordelio (R)	34	11	10	13	42	39	+3	32	Relegation to Delta Ethniki
16	Anagennisi Karditsa (R)	34	10	10	14	26	36	−10	30	Relegation to Delta Ethniki
17	Aspida Xanthi (R)	34	9	9	16	39	53	−14	27	Relegation to Delta Ethniki
18	Kilkisiakos (R)	34	7	9	18	26	54	−28	23	Relegation to Delta Ethniki

(C) Champions; (P) Promoted; (R) Relegated
