= Zdenko Muf =

Serbian footballer (born 1971)

Personal information
- Date of birth: 21 July 1971 (age 55)
- Place of birth: Smederevska Palanka, SFR Yugoslavia
- Height: 1.78 m (5 ft 10 in)
- Positions: Striker; winger

Youth career
- Mladost Goša
- Radnički Beograd

Senior career*
Years	Team	Apps	(Gls)
1991–1993	Radnički Beograd	34	(11)
1991–1992	→ IMT (loan)	26	(17)
1993–1994	PAS Giannina	33	(29)
1994–1996	Kalamata	42	(15)
1995–1996	PAS Giannina	21	(9)
1996	Badajoz	8	(0)
1997	Panelefsiniakos	16	(10)
1997–2001	Tecos UAG	144	(39)
2001	Club León	16	(3)
2002	Tecos UAG	11	(3)
2002–2003	PAS Giannina	8	(0)
Total		359	(136)

Managerial career
- 2011–2013: Jasenica
- 2013–2014: Mladi Radnik
- 2014–2016: Jasenica
- 2017–2018: Karađorđe Topola
- 2018: Sloga 33
- 2019–2020: Mladi Radnik
- 2022–2023: Morava Velika Plana
- 2023: Sloga 33
- 2024–2025: Morava Velika Plana
- * Club domestic league appearances and goals

Zdenko Muf (Serbian Cyrillic: Зденко Муф; born 21 July 1971) is a Serbian football manager and former player.

== Playing career ==
Born in Smederevska Palanka, Muff started out at his local club Mladost Goša, before moving to Radnički Beograd still as a junior. He spent five years at the club, making his First League of FR Yugoslavia debut in the 1992–93 season. Alongside his teammate Vladan Milojević, Muff moved abroad in the summer of 1993, signing with Greek club PAS Giannina. He was the Beta Ethniki top scorer with 29 goals from 33 appearances in the 1993–94 season. Subsequently, together with Milojević, Muff was transferred to Kalamata, helping the club win promotion to the top flight in 1995. He made his Alpha Ethniki debut in the 1995–96 season, before being loaned out to his former club PAS Giannina.

In the summer of 1996, Muff moved to Spain and joined Segunda División side Badajoz. He failed to make an impact at the club, before moving back to Greece for a six-month spell at Panelefsiniakos. In the summer of 1997, Muff moved to Mexican side Estudiantes Tecos. He spent the following four years at the club, becoming one of the league's best foreign players. Muf also played for Club León in the Invierno 2001, before returning to Estudiantes Tecos.

In the summer of 2002, Muff returned to Greece and joined his former club PAS Giannina. He eventually left the club in the spring of 2003, as they struggled financially. After returning to his homeland, Muf subsequently decided to retire from active play due to a lack of motivation and satisfying offers. He is a real idol for the fans of PAS Giannina in Greece.

== Post-playing career ==
After several years hiatus, Muff became manager of GFK Jasenica 1911, being in charge of the club between 2011 and 2013. He then led Mladi Radnik from July 2013 to April 2014, before returning to GFK Jasenica 1911.

== Career statistics ==
Appearances and goals by club, season and competition
Club	Season	League		Cup		Total	
Club	Season	Apps	Goals	Apps	Goals	Apps	Goals
IMT (loan)	1991–92	26	17			26	17
Radnički Beograd	1991–92	4	2			4	2
Radnički Beograd	1992–93	30	9	3	0	33	9
Radnički Beograd	Total	34	11	3	0	37	11
PAS Giannina	1993–94	33	29	8	7	41	36
Kalamata	1994–95	33	12	4	2	37	14
Kalamata	1995–96	9	3			9	3
Kalamata	Total	42	15	4	2	46	17
PAS Giannina	1995–96	21	9			21	9
Badajoz	1996–97	8	0	2	1	10	1
Panelefsiniakos	1996–97	16	10			16	10
Tecos UAG	Invierno 1997	15	3	–		15	3
Tecos UAG	Verano 1998	19	4	–		19	4
Tecos UAG	Invierno 1998	19	6	–		19	6
Tecos UAG	Verano 1999	18	8	–		18	8
Tecos UAG	Invierno 1999	19	6	–		19	6
Tecos UAG	Verano 2000	17	3	–		17	3
Tecos UAG	Invierno 2000	17	6	–		17	6
Tecos UAG	Verano 2001	20	3	–		20	3
Tecos UAG	Total	144	39	–		144	39
Club León	Invierno 2001	16	3	–		16	3
Tecos UAG	Verano 2002	11	3	–		11	3
PAS Giannina	2002–03	8	0	1	0	9	0
Career total		359	136	18	10	377	146
