= 1989–90 Beta Ethniki =

Beta Ethniki
- Season: 1989–90
- Dates: 17 September 1989 – 27 May 1990
- Champions: Athinaikos
- Promoted: Athinaikos; Panachaiki; PAS Giannina
- Relegated: Naoussa; Kallithea; Niki Volos; Sparta

Beta Ethniki 1989–90 complete season.

== League table ==
Location of teams in 1989–90 Beta Ethniki

Pos	Team	Pld	W	D	L	GF	GA	GD	Pts	Promotion or relegation
1	Athinaikos (C, P)	34	18	10	6	50	26	+24	46	Promotion to Alpha Ethniki
2	Panachaiki (P)	34	17	9	8	47	36	+11	43	Promotion to Alpha Ethniki
3	PAS Giannina (P)	34	13	14	7	47	29	+18	40	Promotion to Alpha Ethniki
4	Kastoria	34	13	13	8	38	34	+4	39	
5	Edessaikos	34	13	10	11	46	40	+6	36	
6	Charavgiakos	34	13	10	11	38	38	0	36	
7	Makedonikos	34	14	7	13	48	41	+7	35	
8	Korinthos	34	12	10	12	40	27	+13	34	
9	Eordaikos	34	11	12	11	28	33	−5	34	
10	Veria	34	11	11	12	44	47	−3	33	
11	Rethymniakos	34	12	9	13	29	33	−4	33	
12	Diagoras Rodos	34	14	5	15	33	34	−1	33	
13	Atromitos (Note: Atromitos had 1 point deducted.)	34	13	8	13	42	37	+5	33	
14	Pierikos	34	11	11	12	40	44	−4	33	
15	Naoussa (R)	34	14	2	18	41	45	−4	30	Relegation to Gamma Ethniki
16	Kallithea (R)	34	9	7	18	34	54	−20	25	Relegation to Gamma Ethniki
17	Niki Volos (R)	34	8	8	18	35	54	−19	24	Relegation to Gamma Ethniki
18	Sparta (R)	34	8	8	18	29	57	−28	24	Relegation to Gamma Ethniki

(C) Champions; (P) Promoted; (R) Relegated

== Results ==
Home \ Away	ATH	ATR	CHV	DIA	EDE	EOR	KLT	KAS	KOR	MAK	NAO	NVL	PCK	PAS	PIE	RTY	SPA	VER
Athinaikos		2–0	2–0	2–0	1–0	3–0	4–1	2–2	0–0	3–0	2–0	1–0	2–0	2–0	2–0	1–0	1–1	3–0
Atromitos	1–1		3–0	1–0	4–1	3–0	4–1	2–0	2–1	2–1	2–0	0–0	1–0	1–1	0–0	2–0	1–0	1–1
Charavgiakos	0–2	5–1		1–0	1–0	1–0	5–3	1–1	1–0	0–1	2–0	2–1	3–0	2–2	1–0	1–1	1–0	2–0
Diagoras Rodos	1–0	2–1	1–1		3–1	1–0	1–0	2–1	1–0	1–1	2–1	4–0	0–0	1–0	1–0	1–0	3–0	2–3
Edessaikos	0–0	3–1	2–0	1–0		4–1	2–0	2–2	1–1	4–3	1–0	1–0	0–0	1–2	2–0	1–1	1–0	4–1
Eordaikos	2–2	2–1	0–0	0–0	2–1		1–0	1–1	1–1	2–0	1–0	1–0	0–0	1–0	1–1	3–0	3–0	1–0
Kallithea	1–1	2–0	2–0	1–3	2–1	4–0		1–0	0–0	1–2	0–1	0–1	4–2	0–0	1–0	1–2	2–1	3–2
Kastoria	0–0	1–1	2–1	2–0	0–0	2–0	1–1		1–0	1–0	2–1	1–0	2–0	1–1	1–0	0–0	2–0	1–1
Korinthos	1–0	1–0	0–1	2–0	4–2	0–0	4–0	3–1		0–0	1–0	2–0	1–1	1–1	0–0	2–1	7–0	5–1
Makedonikos	1–2	1–0	2–1	2–0	3–1	0–1	2–0	1–1	2–0		3–0	3–0	1–1	1–2	0–2	3–0	4–1	2–0
Naoussa	2–1	0–2	4–1	3–1	1–4	1–0	1–0	3–1	2–0	2–1		5–1	0–1	1–1	3–2	1–2	2–1	2–0
Niki Volos	2–2	1–1	2–2	2–0	0–0	2–1	1–1	1–2	0–1	2–4	1–0		5–2	1–1	3–1	2–0	5–1	0–0
Panachaiki	3–2	2–0	2–0	1–0	3–1	0–0	1–0	3–1	1–0	1–1	1–1	2–1		1–0	2–0	4–1	5–2	2–0
PAS Giannina	5–0	1–0	0–0	2–0	2–2	1–1	3–0	0–1	1–0	4–0	1–0	3–0	0–2		3–3	1–0	2–0	2–2
Pierikos	1–0	4–3	0–0	2–2	0–0	2–1	4–1	3–1	2–1	1–0	1–0	2–1	2–2	1–1		1–1	2–1	1–2
Rethymniakos	0–1	1–0	0–0	1–0	2–1	1–0	0–0	0–1	1–1	2–0	2–0	2–0	0–1	2–2	3–0		2–1	1–0
Sparta	0–1	1–1	2–2	1–0	0–1	0–0	1–1	1–0	2–0	1–1	3–2	3–0	1–0	1–0	2–0	0–0		1–5
Veria	2–2	1–0	2–0	1–0	0–0	1–1	3–0	2–2	1–0	2–2	1–2	3–0	4–1	0–2	2–2	1–0	0–0	

Legend: Blue = home team win; Yellow = draw; Red = away team win.

== Top scorers ==
Rank	Player	Club	Goals
1	(Greece) Alexis Alexandris	Veria	21
2	(Greece) Giorgos Vaitsis	Panachaiki	17
2	(Greece) Manolis Chandapakis	Niki Volos	17
4	(Greece) Charis Sofianos	Charavgiakos	14
5	(Greece) Michalis Alexiadis	Naoussa	12
5	(Greece) Nikolaos Papanikolaou	PAS Giannina	12
