= 1963–64 Beta Ethniki =

Beta Ethniki
- Season: 1963–64
- Dates: 13 October 1963 – 31 May 1964
- Champions: Panachaiki (Group 1); Proodeftiki (Group 2); Filippoi Kavala (Group 3); Trikala (Group 4)
- Promoted: Proodeftiki; Trikala
- Relegated: Ilisiakos; Doxa Vyronas; Asteras Athens; Dorieas; Preveza; AO Sparti; Panarkadikos; Irodotos; Aias Salamina; Pagchaniakos; AE Mytilenes; Panchiakos; Olympiakos Loutraki; Atsalenios; Orfeas Komotini; Achilleas Triandrìa; Doxa Neapolis Thessaloniki; Orfeas Xanthi; Olympiakos Kozani; Larisaikos; Anaplasi Tyrnavos; Iraklis Volos; Dimitra Trikala

Beta Ethniki 1963–64 complete season.

== Group 1 ==
=== League table ===
Pos	Team	Pld	W	D	L	GF	GA	GD	Pts	Qualification or relegation
1	Panachaiki (C)	28	20	3	5	57	22	+35	71	Qualification for Promotion play-off
2	Diagoras	28	20	3	5	55	30	+25	65 (Note: Diagoras had 6 points deducted.)	
3	Fostiras	28	15	7	6	58	32	+26	64 (Note: Fostiras and Dorieas had 1 point deducted.)	
4	Atromitos	28	15	4	9	61	28	+33	62	
5	Thyella Patras	28	13	8	7	60	34	+26	62	
6	Panetolikos	28	15	4	9	47	30	+17	62	
7	Averof Ioannina	28	14	6	8	44	34	+10	62	
8	Rodiakos	28	14	6	8	45	45	0	60 (Note: Rodiakos and Preveza had 2 points deducted.)	
9	Ilisiakos (R)	30	14	8	8	31	26	+5	59 (Note: Ilisiakos had 7 points deducted.)	Relegation to C National Amateur Division
10	Doxa Vyronas (R)	28	12	7	9	41	37	+4	59	Relegation to C National Amateur Division
11	Asteras Athens (R)	30	11	2	17	40	50	−10	51 (Note: Asteras Athens and AO Sparti had 3 points deducted.)	Relegation to C National Amateur Division
12	Dorieas (R)	28	7	5	16	41	67	−26	46	Relegation to C National Amateur Division
13	Preveza (R)	28	4	7	17	32	60	−28	41	Relegation to C National Amateur Division
14	AO Sparti (R)	28	1	10	17	23	65	−42	37	Relegation to C National Amateur Division
15	Panarkadikos (R)	28	0	4	24	18	93	−75	32	Relegation to C National Amateur Division

(C) Champions; (R) Relegated

== Group 2 ==
=== League table ===
Pos	Team	Pld	W	D	L	GF	GA	GD	Pts	Qualification or relegation
1	Proodeftiki (C, P)	32	22	9	1	82	20	+62	85	Qualification for Promotion play-off
2	Vyzas	32	18	9	5	62	31	+31	77	
3	OFI	32	17	7	8	63	35	+28	73	
4	Panelefsiniakos	32	15	9	8	66	40	+26	71	
5	Argonaftis Piraeus	32	15	7	10	69	37	+32	69	
6	Aris Piraeus	32	15	7	10	43	26	+17	69	
7	Pannafpliakos	32	14	9	9	56	41	+15	69	
8	Korinthos	32	14	8	10	43	27	+16	68	
9	Atromitos Piraeus	32	14	8	10	53	38	+15	68	
10	AE Nikaia	32	12	11	9	45	31	+14	67	
11	Irodotos (R)	32	11	8	13	37	53	−16	62	Relegation to C National Amateur Division
12	Aias Salamina (R)	32	9	10	13	35	32	+3	60	Relegation to C National Amateur Division
13	Pagchaniakos (R)	32	9	9	14	38	68	−30	58 (Note: Pagchaniakos had 1 point deducted.)	Relegation to C National Amateur Division
14	AE Mytilenes (R)	32	9	7	16	36	49	−13	57	Relegation to C National Amateur Division
15	Panchiakos (R)	32	6	5	21	33	96	−63	49	Relegation to C National Amateur Division
16	Olympiakos Loutraki (R)	32	7	4	21	24	74	−50	46 (Note: Olympiakos Loutraki and Atsalenios had 4 points deducted.)	Relegation to C National Amateur Division
17	Atsalenios (R)	32	2	1	29	28	115	−87	33	Relegation to C National Amateur Division

(C) Champions; (P) Promoted; (R) Relegated

== Group 3 ==
=== League table ===
Pos	Team	Pld	W	D	L	GF	GA	GD	Pts	Qualification or relegation
1	Trikala (C, P)	30	17	9	4	48	18	+30	73	Qualification for Promotion play-off
2	Olympiacos Volos	30	20	4	6	53	25	+28	73 (Note: Olympiacos Volos, Aris Kastoria, Levadiakos, Naoussa and Olympiakos Kozani had 1 point deducted.)	
3	Edessaikos	30	15	11	4	45	22	+23	71	
4	Aris Ptolemaida	30	12	10	8	40	30	+10	64	
5	Aris Kastoria	30	13	8	9	54	38	+16	63	
6	Iraklis Larissa	30	11	9	10	34	33	+1	61	
7	Levadiakos	30	12	8	10	41	41	0	61	
8	Kadmos Thiva	30	14	3	13	33	45	−12	61	
9	Veria	30	9	12	9	42	35	+7	60	
10	AS Lamiakos	30	11	8	11	39	38	+1	60	
11	Olympiakos Kozani (R)	30	12	5	13	34	31	+3	59	Relegation to C National Amateur Division
12	Larisaikos (R)	30	11	5	14	30	39	−9	57	Relegation to C National Amateur Division
13	Naoussa	30	13	4	13	43	35	+8	59	
14	Anaplasi Tyrnavos (R)	30	7	7	16	23	39	−16	51	Relegation to C National Amateur Division
15	Iraklis Volos (R)	30	4	5	21	17	65	−48	43	Relegation to C National Amateur Division
16	Dimitra Trikala (R)	30	3	5	22	15	57	−42	41 (Note: Dimitra Trikala had 5 points deducted.)	Relegation to C National Amateur Division

(C) Champions; (P) Promoted; (R) Relegated

=== First place play-off ===
Team 1	Score	Team 2
Trikala	3–2	Olympiacos Volos

== Group 4 ==
=== League table ===
Pos	Team	Pld	W	D	L	GF	GA	GD	Pts	Qualification or relegation
1	Filippoi Kavala (C)	26	16	8	2	48	18	+30	66	Qualification for Promotion play-off
2	Iraklis Serres	26	17	6	3	41	19	+22	66	
3	Thermaikos Thessaloniki	26	16	6	4	47	27	+20	64	
4	Makedonikos	26	10	9	7	45	31	+14	55	
5	MENT Toumba	26	10	9	7	56	41	+15	55	
6	Apollon Serres	26	12	5	9	37	35	+2	55	
7	Megas Alexandros Irakleia	26	10	8	8	42	49	−7	54	
8	Iraklis Kavala	26	10	6	10	40	26	+14	52	
9	Elpida Drama	26	9	6	11	40	35	+5	50	
10	Aris Drama	26	6	8	12	25	41	−16	46	
11	Orfeas Komotini (R)	26	6	7	13	32	57	−25	45	Relegation to C National Amateur Division
12	Achilleas Triandrìa (R)	26	5	6	15	30	52	−22	42	Relegation to C National Amateur Division
13	Doxa Neapolis Thessaloniki (R)	26	4	7	15	25	47	−22	41	Relegation to C National Amateur Division
14	Orfeas Xanthi (R)	26	3	5	18	17	47	−30	37	Relegation to C National Amateur Division

(C) Champions; (R) Relegated

=== First place play-off ===
Team 1	Score	Team 2
Filippoi Kavala	1–0	Iraklis Serres

== Promotion play-off ==
Pos	Team	Pld	W	D	L	GF	GA	GD	Pts	Promotion
1	Trikala (P)	6	4	1	1	10	7	+3	15	Promotion to Alpha Ethniki
2	Proodeftiki (P)	6	3	2	1	12	7	+5	14	Promotion to Alpha Ethniki
3	Panachaiki	6	2	1	3	6	8	−2	11	
4	Filippoi Kavala	6	1	0	5	8	14	−6	8	

(P) Promoted

Home \ Away	TRI	PRO	PNC	FIL
Trikala		2–1	1–0	2–1
Proodeftiki	1–1		3–0	2–1
Panachaiki	3–0	1–1		2–1
Filippoi Kavala	1–4	2–4	2–0	

Legend: Blue = home team win; Yellow = draw; Red = away team win.
