= 1997–98 Gamma Ethniki =

Gamma Ethniki
- Season: 1997–98
- Champions: Ialysos (South); PAS Giannina (North)
- Promoted: Ialysos; Agios Nikolaos; PAS Giannina; Pierikos
- Relegated: Pamisos Messini; Ergotelis; Kerkyra; Agia Eleousa; Korinthos Pyrgos; Orfeas Alexandroupoli; Tyrnavos; Orestis Orestiada; Agrotikos Asteras; Apollon Larissa; Anagennisi Arta

The 1997–98 Gamma Ethniki was the 15th season since the official establishment of the third tier of Greek football in 1983. Ialysos and PAS Giannina were crowned champions in Southern and Northern Group respectively, thus winning promotion to Beta Ethniki. Agios Nikolaos and Pierikos also won promotion as a runners-up of the groups.

Pamisos Messini, Ergotelis, Kerkyra, Agia Eleousa, Korinthos, Pyrgos, Orfeas Alexandroupoli, Tyrnavos, Orestis Orestiada, Agrotikos Asteras, Apollon Larissa and Anagennisi Arta were relegated to Delta Ethniki.

== Southern Group ==
=== League table ===
Pos	Team	Pld	W	D	L	GF	GA	GD	Pts	Promotion or relegation
1	Ialysos (C, P)	28	16	7	5	56	27	+29	55	Promotion to Beta Ethniki
2	Agios Nikolaos (P)	28	16	5	7	43	23	+20	53	Promotion to Beta Ethniki
3	Marko	28	16	2	10	51	35	+16	50	
4	Keratsini	28	15	2	11	57	38	+19	47	
5	Rethymniakos	28	12	9	7	41	26	+15	45	
6	Nafpaktiakos Asteras	28	12	6	10	47	36	+11	42	
7	Panegialios	28	11	9	8	48	37	+11	42	
8	Aiolikos	28	10	10	8	30	31	−1	40	
9	Egaleo	28	12	4	12	36	38	−2	40	
10	Pamisos Messini (R)	28	12	3	13	24	32	−8	39	Relegation to Delta Ethniki
11	Ergotelis (R)	28	12	2	14	40	45	−5	38	Relegation to Delta Ethniki
12	Kerkyra (R)	28	8	7	13	26	34	−8	31	Relegation to Delta Ethniki
13	Agia Eleousa (R)	28	7	9	12	26	40	−14	30	Relegation to Delta Ethniki
14	Korinthos (R)	28	6	1	21	25	76	−51	19	Relegation to Delta Ethniki
15	Pyrgos (Note: Pyrgos had 12 points deducted.) (R)	28	5	4	19	35	67	−32	7	Relegation to Delta Ethniki

(C) Champions; (P) Promoted; (R) Relegated

=== Results ===
Home \ Away	AGE	AGN	AIO	EGA	ERG	IAL	KRT	KER	KOR	MAR	NAP	PAM	PNG	PYR	RTY
Agia Eleousa		1–1	2–1	1–0	1–1	2–0	1–1	0–0	1–1	2–1	0–2	0–2	1–1	4–0	2–1
Agios Nikolaos	2–0		2–0	3–2	4–0	2–1	3–0	2–1	4–0	3–0	1–0	1–0	2–1	1–0	3–2
Aiolikos	5–1	1–0		1–0	2–1	1–1	0–1	2–1	3–0	1–0	0–0	2–0	1–1	2–0	1–0
Egaleo	3–1	1–0	1–1		1–0	1–1	4–1	1–0	1–0	2–1	1–0	0–0	1–0	3–1	2–1
Ergotelis	3–1	3–1	4–0	1–0		1–0	2–0	2–2	2–1	3–1	2–1	3–0	3–0	2–0	1–3
Ialysos	4–0	2–1	5–0	4–1	1–0		3–0	1–0	3–0	3–0	3–3	2–0	1–0	4–2	1–1
Keratsini	0–1	2–0	1–0	5–1	4–2	0–2		7–1	11–1	3–0	3–1	1–0	1–1	2–1	3–0
Kerkyra	1–1	0–2	1–1	2–1	1–0	1–1	1–0		2–0	2–3	1–0	0–0	4–1	1–0	1–1
Korinthos	1–0	1–2	3–2	2–4	2–1	1–4	1–3	1–0		1–2	2–7	0–1	0–2	2–1	3–2
Marko	1–0	1–1	1–1	3–1	1–0	4–1	1–0	1–0	5–0		3–1	3–1	3–0	3–0	1–2
Nafpaktiakos Asteras	2–0	0–0	2–2	3–2	2–1	2–0	2–4	1–0	2–1	2–0		2–0	6–2	2–0	0–0
Pamisos Messini	1–0	1–0	0–0	2–1	3–1	0–1	1–0	2–1	3–0	1–0	1–0		1–2	3–1	1–2
Panegialios	1–1	1–1	2–0	1–1	6–0	0–0	4–0	2–0	2–0	1–4	2–0	4–0		1–0	1–1
Pyrgos	2–2	1–1	0–0	1–0	4–1	4–7	0–2	0–3	3–2	2–4	4–3	2–1	5–9		1–1
Rethymniakos	2–0	1–0	0–0	3–0	3–0	0–0	4–1	1–0	3–0	1–4	1–1	3–0	0–0	2–0	

Legend: Blue = home team win; Yellow = draw; Red = away team win.

== Northern Group ==
=== League table ===
Pos	Team	Pld	W	D	L	GF	GA	GD	Pts	Promotion or relegation
1	PAS Giannina (C, P)	28	14	11	3	42	21	+21	53	Promotion to Beta Ethniki
2	Pierikos (P)	28	12	11	5	35	23	+12	47	Promotion to Beta Ethniki
3	Kozani	28	12	9	7	37	21	+16	45	
4	Ampelokipi	28	11	10	7	29	26	+3	43	
5	Preveza	28	11	8	9	44	34	+10	41	
6	Poseidon Michaniona	28	10	10	8	28	23	+5	40	
7	Aetos Skydra	28	10	10	8	28	29	−1	40	
8	Olympiacos Volos	28	11	7	10	36	34	+2	40	
9	Naoussa	28	11	6	11	36	26	+10	39	
10	Orfeas Alexandroupoli (R)	28	10	8	10	32	32	0	38	Relegation to Delta Ethniki
11	Tyrnavos (R)	28	11	4	13	34	46	−12	37	Relegation to Delta Ethniki
12	Orestis Orestiada (R)	28	7	12	9	22	28	−6	33	Relegation to Delta Ethniki
13	Agrotikos Asteras (R)	28	7	10	11	25	28	−3	31	Relegation to Delta Ethniki
14	Apollon Larissa (R)	28	5	7	16	24	45	−21	22	Relegation to Delta Ethniki
15	Anagennisi Arta (R)	28	4	5	19	17	53	−36	17	Relegation to Delta Ethniki

(C) Champions; (P) Promoted; (R) Relegated

=== Results ===
Home \ Away	AET	AGR	AMP	ART	APL	KOZ	NAO	OLV	ORE	ORF	PAS	PIE	PNM	PRE	TYR
Aetos Skydra		2–0	1–0	1–0	3–3	3–1	2–0	0–1	3–1	0–1	3–2	3–3	1–0	1–1	1–0
Agrotikos Asteras	0–0		3–0	2–0	2–1	1–0	1–0	0–1	0–0	0–0	0–1	0–1	0–1	0–1	3–0
Ampelokipi	1–1	1–2		0–0	2–0	2–0	0–0	4–2	0–0	1–0	1–1	3–2	2–0	1–0	3–1
Anagennisi Arta	0–2	0–0	0–1		1–0	1–3	1–0	2–1	0–1	2–4	0–0	0–2	0–0	2–2	2–3
Apollon Larissa	0–0	1–0	0–1	3–4		1–0	1–2	1–1	1–0	0–2	1–4	0–0	0–0	2–0	0–0
Kozani	0–0	4–2	2–0	3–0	2–1		1–0	0–0	3–0	3–0	0–0	2–0	1–1	1–1	3–0
Naoussa	4–0	2–0	2–0	5–0	4–0	2–1		1–0	0–0	2–2	0–1	1–1	1–0	3–0	3–1
Olympiacos Volos	0–0	3–1	2–0	3–0	2–2	1–1	3–0		1–1	2–0	3–1	1–0	2–3	2–2	3–1
Orestis Orestiada	1–1	1–1	1–2	2–0	3–1	0–0	2–0	1–2		0–0	2–2	0–0	1–0	1–0	3–0
Orfeas Alexandroupoli	3–0	2–2	1–2	1–0	2–1	1–1	1–1	2–0	2–0		2–0	0–0	1–2	1–0	0–1
PAS Giannina	1–0	1–1	1–1	4–0	5–0	1–0	1–0	2–0	3–0	1–0		0–0	1–0	3–2	4–3
Pierikos	2–0	1–0	1–1	4–1	1–0	1–0	1–1	2–0	0–0	3–1	0–0		2–1	3–0	2–1
Poseidon Michaniona	0–0	1–1	0–0	2–0	2–0	1–1	1–0	3–0	2–0	2–2	1–1	1–1		1–0	2–1
Preveza	3–0	2–2	2–2	2–1	1–0	1–2	1–0	3–0	4–1	4–1	0–0	4–1	3–1		3–0
Tyrnavos	1–0	1–1	2–0	2–0	1–4	0–2	4–2	1–0	2–1	2–0	1–1	2–1	1–0	2–2	

Legend: Blue = home team win; Yellow = draw; Red = away team win.
