= 1992–93 Gamma Ethniki =

Gamma Ethniki
- Season: 1992–93
- Champions: Kallithea (South); Anagennisi Karditsa (North)
- Promoted: Kallithea; Kalamata; Anagennisi Karditsa; Veria
- Relegated: Ilisiakos; Kerkyra; Poseidon Heraklion; Sparti; Diagoras; Chalkida; Odysseas Kordelio; Anagennisi Chalkidona; Pontioi Kozani; Poseidon Nea Michaniona; Anagennisi Arta; Fokikos

The 1992–93 Gamma Ethniki was the tenth season since the official establishment of the third tier of Greek football in 1983. Kallithea and Anagennisi Karditsa were crowned champions in Southern and Northern Group respectively, thus winning promotion to Beta Ethniki. Kalamata and Veria also won promotion as a runners-up of the groups.

Ilisiakos, Kerkyra, Poseidon Heraklion, Sparti, Diagoras, Chalkida, Odysseas Kordelio, Anagennisi Chalkidona, Pontioi Kozani, Poseidon Nea Michaniona, Anagennisi Arta and Fokikos were relegated to Delta Ethniki.

== Southern Group ==
=== League table ===
Pos	Team	Pld	W	D	L	GF	GA	GD	Pts	Promotion or relegation
1	Kallithea (C, P)	34	18	9	7	57	35	+22	63	Promotion to Beta Ethniki
2	Kalamata (P)	34	19	4	11	55	38	+17	61	Promotion to Beta Ethniki
3	Paniliakos	34	17	10	7	52	28	+24	61	
4	Ethnikos Asteras	34	19	4	11	47	41	+6	61	
5	Panarkadikos	34	17	6	11	47	41	+6	57	
6	Egaleo (Note: Egaleo had 3 points deducted.)	34	19	3	12	47	33	+14	57	
7	Panelefsiniakos	34	13	11	10	55	35	+20	50	
8	Irodotos	34	14	8	12	34	32	+2	50	
9	Rodos	34	13	10	11	46	39	+7	49	
10	Pannafpliakos	34	12	11	11	54	42	+12	47	
11	Aiolikos	34	13	8	13	46	51	−5	47	
12	Chaidari	34	13	7	14	53	41	+12	46	
13	Ilisiakos (R)	34	12	8	14	34	40	−6	44	Relegation to Delta Ethniki
14	Kerkyra (R)	34	12	6	16	42	57	−15	42	Relegation to Delta Ethniki
15	Poseidon Heraklion (R)	34	11	5	18	37	58	−21	38	Relegation to Delta Ethniki
16	Sparti (R)	34	8	11	15	27	43	−16	35	Relegation to Delta Ethniki
17	Diagoras (R)	34	8	6	20	32	61	−29	30	Relegation to Delta Ethniki
18	Chalkida (Note: Chalkida had 6 points deducted.) (R)	32	3	3	26	23	73	−50	6	Relegation to Delta Ethniki

(C) Champions; (P) Promoted; (R) Relegated

== Northern Group ==
=== League table ===
Pos	Team	Pld	W	D	L	GF	GA	GD	Pts	Promotion or relegation
1	Anagennisi Karditsa (C, P)	34	16	13	5	50	23	+27	61	Promotion to Beta Ethniki
2	Veria (P)	34	16	11	7	45	27	+18	59	Promotion to Beta Ethniki
3	Anagennisi Kolindros	34	16	11	7	31	22	+9	59	
4	Asteras Ambelokipoi	34	14	8	12	40	33	+7	50	
5	Nigrita	34	12	13	9	38	36	+2	49	
6	Apollon Larissa	34	12	12	10	46	35	+11	48	
7	Trikala	34	11	15	8	37	29	+8	48	
8	Kilkisiakos	34	13	9	12	41	42	−1	48	
9	Makedonikos	34	11	14	9	54	37	+17	47	
10	Pandramaikos	34	13	8	13	40	35	+5	47	
11	Kastoria	34	12	10	12	42	40	+2	46	
12	Ethnikos Alexandroupoli	34	13	6	15	36	36	0	45	
13	Odysseas Kordelio (R)	34	12	7	15	28	37	−9	43	Relegation to Delta Ethniki
14	Anagennisi Chalkidona (R)	34	11	9	14	40	47	−7	42	Relegation to Delta Ethniki
15	Pontioi Kozani (R)	34	11	6	17	39	56	−17	39	Relegation to Delta Ethniki
16	Poseidon Nea Michaniona (R)	34	8	13	13	36	45	−9	37	Relegation to Delta Ethniki
17	Anagennisi Arta (R)	34	9	7	18	28	55	−27	34	Relegation to Delta Ethniki
18	Fokikos (R)	34	8	4	22	24	60	−36	28	Relegation to Delta Ethniki

(C) Champions; (P) Promoted; (R) Relegated
