= Željko Simović =

Serbian football manager and player

Personal information
- Date of birth: 2 February 1967 (age 59)
- Place of birth: Belgrade, SR Serbia, SFR Yugoslavia
- Position: Midfielder

Youth career
- BSK Batajnica

Senior career*
Years	Team	Apps	(Gls)
1986–1987	Napredak Kruševac	3	(0)
1987–1990	Zemun		
1990–1991	Čukarički		
1991–1993	Proleter Zrenjanin	38	(14)
1993–1994	Satde Brest	17	(3)
1994	Daewoo Royals	2	(1)
1994–1996	PAS Giannina		
1996–1997	Kavala	27+	(4+)
1997–1998	Ethnikos Piraeus	26	(2)
1999	Panetolikos		
Total		113+	(24+)

Managerial career
- 2002–2003: Čukarički
- 2007–2008: AE Giannena
- 2019: Bežanija (asst.)
- 2020: Radnički SM (asst.)
- 2021–2022: Zemun (asst.)
- * Club domestic league appearances and goals

Željko Simović (Serbian Cyrillic: Жељко Симовић; born 2 February 1967) is a Serbian former football manager and player.

== Playing career ==
Simović joined Napredak Kruševac from BSK Batajnica in 1986, making three appearances in the 1986–87 Yugoslav Second League. He subsequently switched to Zemun in 1987, spending the next three years with the club. After completing his compulsory military service in 1989–90, Simović was let go by Zemun and went on to join Čukarički. He would earn a transfer to Proleter Zrenjanin in 1991, making 24 appearances and scoring seven goals in the final season of the Yugoslav First League.

In 1993, Simović moved abroad to play for French club Brest, netting three goals in the Championnat National 1 during the 1993–94 season. He was later acquired by K League side Daewoo Royals in 1994.

In December 1994, Simović moved to Greece and signed with PAS Giannina. He switched to Kavala in January 1996 and helped the club win promotion to the top flight that year, contributing with seven goals. After spending one more season with Kavala, Simović joined fellow Alpha Ethniki club Ethnikos Piraeus in 1997.

== Managerial career ==
In December 2002, Simović was appointed as caretaker manager of Čukarički following the resignation of Miroslav Vukašinović, becoming the permanent manager in January 2003. He was dismissed from his position in May 2003.

Between November 2007 and November 2008, Simović served as manager of Greek club AE Giannena.
