= Dimitris Moustakas (footballer) =

Greek footballer

Personal information
- Date of birth: 8 January 1968 (age 58)
- Position: Forward

Senior career*
Years	Team	Apps	(Gls)
- Xanthi
1995–1996	Doxa Vyronas		(11)
1996–1997	Kavala	4	(0)
–2002	Chalkidona		
2002–2003	Agrotikos Asteras	14	(3)
- * Club domestic league appearances and goals

Dimitris Moustakas (born 8 January 1968) is a Greek former professional footballer who played as a forward.

He was among the top seven goal scorers in the Greek second tier once, during the 1995–96 season with Doxa Vyronas. He played in the first tier for Xanthi and Kavala. In the early 2000s, he played for Chalkidona and Agrotikos Asteras.
