= 1994–95 Gamma Ethniki =

Gamma Ethniki
- Season: 1994–95
- Champions: Doxa Vyronas (South); Kastoria (North)
- Promoted: Doxa Vyronas; Panelefsiniakos; Kastoria; Trikala
- Relegated: Acharnaikos; Egaleo; Messolonghi; Sparti; Kilkisiakos; Pandramaikos; Iraklis Ptolemaida; Acheron Kanallaki

The 1994–95 Gamma Ethniki was the 12th season since the official establishment of the third tier of Greek football in 1983. Doxa Vyronas and Kastoria were crowned champions in Southern and Northern Group respectively, thus winning promotion to Beta Ethniki. Panelefsiniakos and Trikala also won promotion as a runners-up of the groups.

Acharnaikos, Egaleo, Messolonghi, Sparti, Kilkisiakos, Pandramaikos, Iraklis Ptolemaida and Acheron Kanallaki were relegated to Delta Ethniki.

== Southern Group ==
=== League table ===
Pos	Team	Pld	W	D	L	GF	GA	GD	Pts	Promotion or relegation
1	Doxa Vyronas (C, P)	34	21	7	6	59	23	+36	70	Promotion to Beta Ethniki
2	Panelefsiniakos (P)	34	20	5	9	52	26	+26	65	Promotion to Beta Ethniki
3	Ethnikos Asteras	34	19	7	8	50	29	+21	64	
4	Kallithea	34	16	12	6	52	33	+19	60	
5	Agios Nikolaos	34	14	7	13	42	42	0	49	
6	Atromitos	34	12	11	11	31	36	−5	47	
7	Pannafpliakos	34	13	7	14	43	49	−6	46	
8	Panetolikos	34	10	16	8	45	35	+10	46	
9	Chania	34	13	7	14	44	41	+3	46	
10	Fostiras	34	12	7	15	40	43	−3	43	
11	Chalkida	34	12	6	16	40	50	−10	42	
12	Chaidari	34	11	9	14	39	47	−8	42	
13	Aiolikos	34	10	12	12	32	35	−3	42	
14	Varvasiakos	34	10	12	12	34	41	−7	42	
15	Acharnaikos (R)	34	12	5	17	27	40	−13	41	Relegation to Delta Ethniki
16	Egaleo (R)	34	10	7	17	41	50	−9	37	Relegation to Delta Ethniki
17	Messolonghi (R)	34	8	10	16	33	45	−12	34	Relegation to Delta Ethniki
18	Sparti (Note: Sparti had 6 points deducted.) (R)	34	6	7	21	37	76	−39	19	Relegation to Delta Ethniki

(C) Champions; (P) Promoted; (R) Relegated

== Northern Group ==
=== League table ===
Pos	Team	Pld	W	D	L	GF	GA	GD	Pts	Promotion or relegation
1	Kastoria (Note: ?1 bonus point?) (C, P)	34	17	8	9	60	28	+32	60	Promotion to Beta Ethniki
2	Trikala (P)	34	16	10	8	47	31	+16	58	Promotion to Beta Ethniki
3	Orestis Orestiada	34	16	6	12	47	42	+5	54	
4	Eordaikos (Note: Eordaikos had 2 points deducted.)	34	16	7	11	49	35	+14	53	
5	Anagennisi Giannitsa	34	13	12	9	36	39	−3	51	
6	Apollon Larissa	34	14	8	12	48	40	+8	50	
7	Lamia	34	14	8	12	35	32	+3	50	
8	Apollon Krya Vrysi	34	14	7	13	51	47	+4	49	
9	Niki Volos	34	14	6	14	47	43	+4	48	
10	Almopos Aridea	34	14	6	14	52	41	+11	48	
11	Agrotikos Asteras	34	14	6	14	40	38	+2	48	
12	Olympiacos Volos	34	14	5	15	46	39	+7	47	
13	Tyrnavos	34	14	5	15	44	48	−4	47	
14	Velissario	34	12	11	11	42	31	+11	47	
15	Kilkisiakos (Note: ?3 points deducted?) (R)	34	16	2	16	41	47	−6	47	Relegation to Delta Ethniki
16	Pandramaikos (R)	34	12	6	16	38	58	−20	42	Relegation to Delta Ethniki
17	Iraklis Ptolemaida (R)	34	10	10	14	38	42	−4	40	Relegation to Delta Ethniki
18	Acheron Kanallaki (Note: Acheron Kanallaki had 5 points deducted.) (R)	34	4	3	27	20	100	−80	10	Relegation to Delta Ethniki

(C) Champions; (P) Promoted; (R) Relegated
