= Trikala F.C. =

Trikala
- Full name: Athletic Club Trikala (Αθλητικός Όμιλος Τρίκαλα)
- Nicknames: Κυανέρυθροι (Blue and red)
- Short name: AOT
- Founded: 11 July 1963; 63 years ago
- Ground: Trikala Municipal Stadium
- Capacity: 15,000
- Chairman: Stelios Bekas
- Manager: Nikos Badimas
- League: Gamma Ethniki
- 2025–26: Gamma Ethniki (Group 3), 3rd
- Website: www.aotrikala.gr
| Home colours | Away colours |

Trikala Football Club (Greek: Αθλητικός Όμιλος Τρίκαλα, lit. 'Athletic Club Trikala'), mostly known as AO Trikala (Greek: ΑΟ Τρίκαλα), is a Greek semi-professional football club based in the city of Trikala, in central Greece. The club currently competes in the Gamma Ethniki, the third tier of Greek football.

== History ==
=== Formation ===
Until 1963, the town was split in two football wise. The rival football clubs were called Achilleas and A.E.T.. The rivalry between the clubs was intense, and it was the main reason that both narrowly failed to achieve promotion to the 1st Division in the 1962-63 season.

Players, fans and members of the clubs realized that only a merger would benefit the city. On the 10th of July 1963, the General Assemblies of both clubs decided to proceed with the merger. They agreed on the name, red-blue colors for the shirt and two interlocking circles as the badge. The best players would join AO Trikala, while another club named AO Dimitra Trikalon was founded to accommodate the younger players.

On the 16th of July 1963, AO Trikala was officially founded.

=== Early years and success (1963-1973) ===
The merger was an instant success, as the club won promotion from the 2nd Division (Beta Ethniki) to the 1st Division (Alpha Ethniki) in its inaugural season. In the first 10 years of the club's existence, 6 seasons were spent in the top flight.

The most successful was the 1965-66 season, when AOT finished 11th out of 16 teams and also reached the semi-finals of the Greek Cup.

The team was notoriously hard to beat at home and it achieved many notable results over this period, having beaten Olympiacos, PAOK and Aris at home, as well as AEK home and away.

=== A decade of stability (1974-1983) ===
The following decade saw the club stabilizing itself in the 2nd Division. Results in the league were not ideal, with promotion remaining elusive. Participations in the Cup were not successful either, with no appearances past the Round of 16.

A league reorganization in 1982-83 in order to facilitate the establishment of a national 3rd Division meant the club were relegated to this level for the first time.

=== Yo-yo between 2nd and 3rd tier (1984-1993) ===
In this period the club failed to stabilize itself, going up and down the leagues on a number of occasions. AOT nearly dropped to the regional leagues in 1986-87, but a reorganization of the league pyramid gave the club a reprieve. There was some success in the Cup though: AOT reached the quarter finals in 1987-88 and beat Panathinaikos in a Cup Group Stage game in 1992-93.

=== Highs and new lows (1994-2003) ===
The mid 90's saw the team re-establish itself as a strong 2nd Division side, regularly playing in front of very large crowds. Winning the 3rd Division in 1994-95 was followed by a run to the Greek Cup quarter finals in 1995-96. Each season the club was growing, culminating in winning the 2nd Division in 1998-99, returning to the top flight after a 27 year absence.

Relegation from the 1st Division in 1999-00 however was the start of a downward spiral as the owner stopped financing the club. AOT were relegated 3 times in 4 years, with 2002-03 bringing a new low as the club failed to fulfill fixtures and was expelled from the league. This meant relegation to the regional 4th Division for the first time.

=== Lower league wilderness, renaissance and a new disaster (2004-2013) ===
Dysfunctional management and corrupt ownership meant the club suffered in the 3rd and 4th tier until the end of the decade. Things took an upward turn in 2009-10. Having just been promoted from the 4th Division, the club had a great Cup run and finished as runners up in the League, securing a second consecutive promotion via a playoff.

The 2010-11 season was superb on the pitch, with a great Cup run and a very successful League finish that would certainly mean another promotion. However, it was proved that the owner Vangelis Plexidas had submitted a dishonoured check as a bank guarantee (a prerequisite for a licence by the Greek FA). The club was punished with relegation to the 4th tier. To make matters worse, the financial irregularities forced the club to completely withdraw from football for 2 seasons, dropping further into non-league regional football.

After a failed attempt by a local businessman to rename another club and establish it as a new entity, a group of former players and fans managed to revive the club-AOT returned to play in the 2nd local Amateur Division (5th Division overall) which they easily won with 36 wins in 36 games.

=== 2009–10 season ===
This season was the most successful for AO Trikala in a decade. Having won promotion from the Greek 4th Division, AO Trikala was to compete in the Greek National 3rd Division North Group. They signed many experienced players and set their sights on promotion. The club started the season with a great performance in the Greek Cup as they eliminated Kastoria and went on to play fierce local rivals Anagennisi Karditsas at home. A crowd of over 7,500 Trikala fans saw the home team beat their rivals 1–0, with the goalscorer being Dimosthenis Manousakis. In the 4th round, Trikala beat top-flight club Iraklis Thessaloniki in front of over 7,000 home fans. They eventually lost on penalties in the next round, having progressed to the last 16 of the competition.

Despite the good run in the Greek Cup, the team's league performance at the start of the season suffered as their inability to score away from home meant that Trikala dropped many points. But a 9-game streak of consecutive victories at the end of the season meant that Trikala achieved a second-place finish, which qualified them for a playoff match against the division runner-ups.

The playoff match took place on May 29 at the Nea Smirni Stadium in Athens. Approximately 4,000 Trikala supporters attended the match, where AO Trikala defeated Vyzas Megaron 2–0. Costa Rican striker Enoc Perez scored both goals in the victory.

The 2009–10 season also saw AO Trikala breaking some impressive records. The team conceded just 11 goals in 35 league games (including the playoff match), which was a European record for the season. Trikala also finished with an impressive home record of 12 wins, 2 draws and 0 losses, while having conceded only 2 goals (a penalty and an own goal). Trikala also were the most attended team in the division, with attendances regularly rising over 4,000.

=== 2010–2013 ===
The team enjoyed on pitch success in the 2010–11 season at the second-tier football league finishing the league in fourth place and becoming eligible for the promotion playoffs to the top tier Super League. The team never had the opportunity to participate in the playoffs when they were disqualified after emergence of counterfeit bank guarantees proved their financial viability. The bank guarantees were a prerequisite for a license to be granted from EPO. The repercussions from the false guarantees did not end there, as the team relegated to the lowest tier of the Greek football, Delta Ethniki. After further investigations, which uncovered extensive irregularities and undeclared debts, the team was expelled from D-Ethniki into non-league football, which prompted an angry response from fans towards controversial owner Vangelis Plexidas who the fans held responsible for the predicament. In 2012 the official supporters of the club named SAKAFLIADES took charges the reborn of the team. The team will play in the next to last category of Greek football championships in 2013–14.

== Stadium ==
The Trikala Stadium was built in 1950 and it has a horseshoe-like shape, with no stand behind the west goal. It has a main south stand, which is covered by a roof. The stadium was upgraded in 2003, as in that year it hosted the Tsiklitria international athletics Grand Prix. The Record of Attendance is 20,000 in a 1999 match against PAS Giannina. It is the home stadium of Trikala F.C. and hosts other events such as concerts and athletics.

== Crest and colours ==
=== Crest ===
The original design of the Trikala F.C. logo represents the merger of the two local rival football teams, Achilleas Trikalon and A.E.T. It was the merger of which Trikala F.C. was established. Since then the crest has changed several times but the original 'Merger Bond' is still featured. In 2009, the chairman Vaggelis Plexidas asked for a new crest so the design resembles the crest of FC Barcelona since the team's main colours are red and blue.

=== Colours ===
The team's main colours are blue and red.

== Support ==
The club is considered by the most popular provincial because of its past, as well as the high average attendance of viewers per meeting. When he successfully fought in the three highest national categories, there were a record of thousands of fans in the stadiums, with AOT vs Panathinaikos 1–2 being the absolute winner on March 12, 1972 (8 months after the final of European Cup at Wembley) 18,231 tickets were available, while the viewers were certainly much more. Unsurprisingly, however, the turnout record occurred in 1999 in the match against PAS Giannina where 20,000 spectators attended. But even when the team was in the Regional Championship, there were meetings that numbered thousands of people.

Historically, AOT's first organized association of supporters was the Fan Association AO Trikala "Gate 4". Now, it has been renamed to a Fan Club Association - "Sakafliades" with a dynamic presence and action on several levels. The precursor of Sakafliades was the unofficial link of the Hobo Boys, who first organized and created a warm atmosphere in AOT matches.

== Honours ==
=== Leagues ===
- Second Division
  - Winners (4): 1963–64, 1967–68, 1970–71, 1998–99
- Third Division
  - Winners (2): 2014–15, 2019–20
- Fourth Division
  - Winners (2): 2004–05, 2008–09
- Trikala FCA Second Division
  - Winners (1): 2013–14

=== Cups ===
- Gamma Ethniki Cup
  - Winners (1): 2014–15
- Greek Football Amateur Cup
  - Winners (1): 2025–26
- Greek Football Cup
  - Semifinalists (1): 1965–66
- Trikala FCA Cup
  - Winners (3): 2003–04, 2023–24, 2024–25

== Player records ==
Appearances
| # | Nat. | Name | App. |
|---|---|---|---|
| 1 | (Greece) | Sotiris Kalantzis | 344 |
| 2 | (Greece) | Xenofon Patras | 334 |
| 3 | (Greece) | Athanasios Anastasiou | 320 |
| 4 | (Greece) | Thanasis Mpakalis | 313 |
| 5 | (Greece) | Giorgos Lagaras | 311 |
| 6 | (Greece) | Christos Prapas | 311 |
| 7 | (Greece) | Sotiris Nikas | 305 |
| 8 | (Greece) | Thanasis Synatkas | 289 |
| 9 | (Greece) | Stefanos Mylonas | 278 |
| 10 | (Greece) | Giorgos Loukas | 254 |

Goals
| # | Nat. | Name | Goals |
|---|---|---|---|
| 1 | (Greece) | Sotiris Kalantzis | 92 |
| 2 | (Greece) | Vangelis Tsioukas | 91 |
| 3 | (Greece) | Makis Charitidis | 83 |
| 4 | (Greece) | Giorgos Lagaras | 58 |
| 5 | (Greece) | Sotiris Fasoulas | 57 |
| 6 | (Greece) | Pavlos Mpeveniou | 55 |
| 7 | (Greece) | Nikos Kouskounas | 55 |
| 8 | (Greece) | Giannis Chondros | 51 |
| 9 | (Greece) | Vangelis Paraprastanitis | 46 |
| 10 | (Cyprus) | Charalampos Pittakas | 44 |

== Notable players ==
The below players had international caps for their respective countries. Players whose name is listed as bold represented their countries while playing for AO Trikala.

- (Greece) Kostas Fortounis
- (Socialist Federal Republic of Yugoslavia) Lazar Radović
- (Equatorial Guinea) **Javi Balboa**
- (Serbia) Nemanja Tomic
- (Greece) **Apostolos Toskas**
- (Greece) Giorgos Sidiropoulos
- (Greece) Dionysis Chiotis
- (Niger) Moussa Yahaya
- (Albania) **Edmond Dalipi**
- (Costa Rica) David Diach
- (Greece) Vangelis Paraprastanitis
- (Greece) Grigoris Makos
- (Greece) Christos Karkamanis
- (North Macedonia) Blagoja Milevski
- (Slovenia) Aleksandar Rodić
- (Albania) Aleksandër Vasi
- (Chad) Azrack Mahamat
- (Equatorial Guinea) **Iban Iyanga**
- (Comoros) Housseine Zakouani
- (Guinea) Salim Cissé
- (Kenya) **Paul Were**
- (Cameroon) Cyrille Mangan
- (Greece) Giannis Valaoras
- (Greece) Giannis Galitsios
- (Greece) Aris Karasavvidis
- (Indonesia) Ilija Spasojević
- (Bulgaria) Daniel Mladenov
- (Croatia) Andrija Balajić
- (Bulgaria) Ivaylo Petev

== Results by season ==
| Season | Tier | Division | Place | Greek Cup |
|---|---|---|---|---|
| 1963-64 | 2 | Beta | **1/16** | Third round |
| 1964-65 | 1 | Alpha | **12**/16 | Fourth round |
| 1965-66 | 1 | Alpha | **11**/16 | Semi finals |
| 1966-67 | 1 | Alpha | **16**/16 | Round of 16 |
| 1967-68 | 2 | Beta | **1**/16 | Round of 32 |
| 1968-69 | 1 | Alpha | **16**/18 | Second round |
| 1969-70 | 2 | Beta | **2**/18 | Quarter finals |
| 1970-71 | 2 | Beta | **1**/18 | Round of 16 |
| 1971-72 | 1 | Alpha | **12**/18 | Quarter finals |
| 1972-73 | 1 | Alpha | **17**/18 | Round of 32 |
| 1973-74 | 2 | Beta | **5**/21 | Round of 32 |
| 1974-75 | 2 | Beta | **8**/20 | Round of 32 |
| 1975-76 | 2 | Beta | **9**/20 | Round of 16 |
| 1976-77 | 2 | Beta | **6**/20 | Round of 16 |
| 1977-78 | 2 | Beta | **10**/20 | Second round |
| 1978-79 | 2 | Beta | **7**/20 | Round of 16 |
| 1979-80 | 2 | Beta | **5**/20 | Second round |
| 1980-81 | 2 | Beta | **14**/20 | Second round |
| 1981-82 | 2 | Beta | **10**/20 | First round |
| 1981-82 | 2 | Beta | **10**/20 | First round |
| 1982-83 | 2 | Beta | **14**/20 | Round of 32 |

| Season | Tier | Division | Place | Greek Cup |
|---|---|---|---|---|
| 1983-84 | 3 | Gamma | **2**/21 | First round |
| 1984-85 | 2 | Beta | **14**/20 | First round |
| 1985-86 | 2 | Beta | **7**/20 | Round of 32 |
| 1986-87 | 2 | Beta | **11**/20 | First round |
| 1987-88 | 2 | Beta | **17**/18 | Quarter finals |
| 1988-89 | 3 | Gamma | **17**/18 | Group stage |
| 1989-90 | 3 | Gamma | **11**/20 | Group stage |
| 1990-91 | 3 | Gamma | **2**/20 | Group stage |
| 1991-92 | 2 | Beta | **18**/18 | Group stage |
| 1992-93 | 3 | Gamma | **7**/18 | Group stage |
| 1993-94 | 3 | Gamma | **5**/18 | Group stage |
| 1994-95 | 3 | Gamma | **2**/18 | Round of 32 |
| 1995-96 | 2 | Beta | **10**/18 | Quarter finals |
| 1996-97 | 2 | Beta | **8**/18 | First round |
| 1997-98 | 2 | Beta | **7**/18 | First round |
| 1998-99 | 2 | Beta | **1**/18 | First round |
| 1999-00 | 1 | Alpha | **18**/18 | Round of 16 |
| 2000-01 | 2 | Beta | **14**/16 | Group stage |
| 2001-02 | 3 | Gamma | **13**/16 | Group stage |
| 2002-03 | 3 | Gamma | **20**/20 | First round |

- First Division (7): 1964–1967, 1968–1969, 1971–1973, 1999–2000
- Second Division (31): 1963–1964, 1967–1968, 1969–1971, 1973–1983, 1984–1988, 1991–1992, 1995–1999, 2000–2001, 2010–2011, 2015–2019, 2020–2022
- Third Division (17): 1983–1984, 1988–1991, 1992–1995, 2001–2003, 2005–2007, 2009–2010, 2014–2015, 2019–2020, 2022–present
- Fourth Division (2): 2003–2005

== International Matches ==
AO Trikala has never participated in UEFA competitions, however the team has played some international friendlies. Moreover, the club faced Cypriot clubs 6 times when Cypriot clubs were participating in Alpha Ethniki.

International Friendlies
| Season | Club | Home | Away |
|---|---|---|---|
| 1972-73 | (Cyprus) APOEL | 3-0 | |
| 1972-73 | (Bulgaria) Akademik Sofia | 0-0 | |
| 1985-86 | (Hungary) Ferencváros | 0-4 | |
| 1988-89 | (Hungary) MTK | 1-1 | |
| 1995-96 | (Federal Republic of Yugoslavia) Rađevac | | 2-0 |
| 1995-96 | (Federal Republic of Yugoslavia) Kolubara | | 1-1 |
| 1995-96 | (Federal Republic of Yugoslavia) Luk Voćnjak | | 1-0 |
| 1995-96 | (Federal Republic of Yugoslavia) Loznica | | 3-1 |
| 1996-97 | (Federal Republic of Yugoslavia) Bodrine | | 6-0 |
| 1996-97 | (Federal Republic of Yugoslavia) Gučevo | | 0-3 |
| 1997-98 | (Federal Republic of Yugoslavia) Loznica | | 0-0 |
| 1997-98 | (Federal Republic of Yugoslavia) Rađevac | | 4-2 |
| 1997-98 | (Federal Republic of Yugoslavia) Sinđelić Beograd | | 5-1 |
| 1999-00 | (Romania) Caramainul Bușteni | | 1-0 |
| 1999-00 | (Romania) Petrolul Ploiești | | 2-2 |
| 1999-00 | (Romania) Dinamo București | | 2-2 |
| 2001-02 | (Cyprus) Doxa Katokopias | 1-2 | |
| 2010-11 | (Bulgaria) Razlog | | 4-0 |

Official games against Cypriot clubs
| Season | Club | Home | Away |
|---|---|---|---|
| 1968-69 | (Cyprus) AEL Limassol | 3-1 | 3-1 |
| 1971-72 | (Cyprus) Olympiakos Nicosia | 6-1 | 2-1 |
| 1972-73 | (Cyprus) Omonia | 4-1 | 1-0 |

== Bibliography ==
- Αθλητική ιστορία των Τρικάλων - Τόμος Β': ποδόσφαιρο, Βασίλειος Δ. Πελίγκος. 1993, Εκδοτικός Οίκος Φιλολογικού Ιστορικού Λογοτεχνικού Συνδέσμου ΦΙΛΟΣ Τρικάλων (εκτύπωση Κυριακίδη Αφοί), Θεσσαλονίκη, ISBN 960-343-225-3
