= 1964–65 Alpha Ethniki =

29th season of top-tier football league in Greece

Alpha Ethniki
- Season: 1964–65
- Champions: Panathinaikos; 8th Greek title
- Relegated: Apollon Kalamarias; Doxa Drama
- European Cup: Panathinaikos
- Cup Winners' Cup: Olympiacos
- Inter-Cities Fairs Cup: Aris; PAOK
- Matches: 240
- Goals: 674 (2.81 per match)
- Top goalscorer: Giorgos Sideris (24 goals)

The 1964–65 Alpha Ethniki was the 29th season of the highest football league of Greece. The season began on 17 September 1964 and ended on 7 November 1965 after the playing of the last relegation play-off match (last round of regular season were played on 27 June, replay of the Niki Volos-Panathinaikos match was played on 19 September and the relegation play-off was played in October-November). Panathinaikos won their second consecutive and eighth Greek title.

The point system was: Win: 3 points - Draw: 2 points - Loss: 1 point.

== Teams ==
Promoted from 1963–64 Beta Ethniki	Relegated from 1963–64 Alpha Ethniki
Proodeftiki; Trikala	Olympiacos Chalkida; Egaleo

Location of teams in 1964–65 Alpha Ethniki

== League table ==
Pos	Team	Pld	W	D	L	GF	GA	GD	Pts	Qualification or relegation
1	Panathinaikos (C)	30	20	9	1	76	19	+57	79	Qualification for European Cup preliminary round
2	AEK Athens	30	18	10	2	64	22	+42	76	
3	Olympiacos	30	18	5	7	73	40	+33	71	Qualification for Cup Winners' Cup first round
4	Proodeftiki	30	11	12	7	39	32	+7	64	
5	Pierikos	30	12	8	10	39	39	0	62	
6	Apollon Athens	30	11	6	13	45	42	+3	58	
7	Aris	30	8	12	10	38	38	0	58	Invitation for Inter-Cities Fairs Cup second round
8	PAOK	30	9	10	11	29	33	−4	58	Invitation for Inter-Cities Fairs Cup first round
9	Ethnikos Piraeus	30	11	6	13	39	52	−13	58	
10	Panionios	30	9	8	13	39	44	−5	56	
11	Iraklis	30	8	10	12	37	45	−8	56	
12	Trikala	30	9	6	15	38	55	−17	54	
13	Niki Volos	30	9	5	16	23	48	−25	53 (Note: Relegation play-out: Niki Volos–Apollon Kalamarias 1–0, Panegialios–Apollon Kalamarias 2–1, Niki Volos–Panegialios 2–1, Niki Volos 6pts, Panegialios 4pts, Apollon Kalamarias 2pts.)	
14	Panegialios	30	7	9	14	34	55	−21	53	
15	Apollon Kalamarias (R)	30	7	9	14	32	49	−17	53	Relegation to Beta Ethniki
16	Doxa Drama (R)	30	7	7	16	30	62	−32	51	Relegation to Beta Ethniki

Source: RSSSF
Rules for classification: 1st points; 2nd decision match; 3rd head-to-head goal difference.
(C) Champions; (R) Relegated

== Results ==
Home \ Away	AEK	APA	APK	ARIS	DOX	ETH	IRA	NIK	OLY	PAO	PNE	PAN	PAOK	PIE	PRO	TRI
AEK Athens		2–1	3–1	0–0	6–0	3–0	2–1	5–0	3–3	2–2	3–2	1–0	1–0	3–1	1–1	3–0
Apollon Athens	1–7		1–0	1–1	0–0	3–1	1–1	4–0	1–2	0–1	0–1	2–0	1–2	2–0	0–0	4–2
Apollon Kalamarias	0–0	0–0		2–1	4–1	0–1	1–0	1–1	4–4	1–4	2–0	0–0	0–0	2–3	0–1	2–0
Aris	0–1	1–0	1–2		2–0	3–1	1–3	4–1	0–1	2–2	1–1	2–0	0–0	2–1	1–1	0–0
Doxa Drama	1–1	3–2	0–0	2–2		1–0	3–1	2–0	0–2	1–3	1–1	0–1	1–1	0–1	2–1 (Note: Doxa Drama-Proodeftiki 2-1, replayed 2-1.)	1–0
Ethnikos Piraeus	0–0	1–3	1–0	2–2	3–1		4–1	1–0	0–2	3–2	2–2	2–0	1–1	5–1	2–2	2–1
Iraklis	2–2	0–2	3–0	2–2	2–1	1–3		2–1	2–1	1–1	0–0	0–0	0–0	0–1	1–0	4–1
Niki Volos	0–0	2–0	0–1	1–0	2–1	0–1	3–1		0–1	0–0 (Note: Niki Volos–Panathinaikos 1–0, replayed 0–0.)	1–0	2–2	1–0	2–0	1–1	1–0
Olympiacos	1–2	2–4	5–1	2–3	4–1	4–2	3–1	5–1		1–1	1–0	4–0	5–2	3–2	0–3	4–0
Panathinaikos	1–0	3–2	5–1	4–0	5–0	6–0	1–0	5–0	1–1		6–1	3–0	2–0	0–0	5–0	3–0
Panegialios	2–3	2–3	2–0	1–0	2–2	2–0	2–2	0–2	1–4	0–1		1–1	1–0	3–2	1–0	2–4
Panionios	0–4	1–3	3–3	4–3	1–2	2–0	4–1	2–0	0–1	0–3	7–1		1–1	0–0	2–0	5–1
PAOK	1–1	2–1	1–0	0–2	3–2	4–0	1–1	2–1	0–4	0–0	3–0	2–0		0–1	0–1	1–0
Pierikos	1–0	1–1	3–1	0–0	4–1	1–0	1–2	4–0	1–0	0–1	1–0	1–1	1–1		0–0	5–2
Proodeftiki	0–2	2–1	3–1	1–1	3–0	1–1	2–1	2–0	1–1	2–2	2–2	0–2	1–0	6–1		1–0
Trikala	0–3	2–1	2–2	2–1	5–0	3–0	1–1	1–0	3–2	1–3	1–1	1–0	3–1	1–1	1–1	

Source: RSSSF
Legend: Blue = home team win; Yellow = draw; Red = away team win.

== Top scorers ==
Rank	Player	Club	Goals
1	(Greece) Giorgos Sideris	Olympiacos	29
2	(Greece) Takis Loukanidis	Panathinaikos	21
3	(Greece) Kostas Nestoridis	AEK Athens	17
3	(Greece) Giannis Frantzis	Proodeftiki	17
5	(Greece) Kostas Papageorgiou	AEK Athens	15
6	(Greece) Makis Charitidis	Trikala	14
7	(Greece) Mimis Papaioannou	AEK Athens	13
7	(Greece) Savvas Tsokataridis	Doxa Drama	13

== Attendances ==
Olympiacos drew the highest average home attendance in the 1964–65 Alpha Ethniki.

#	Team	Average attendance
1	Olympiacos	26,472
2	Panathinaikos	19,474
3	AEK Athens	15,276
4	Ethnikos Piraeus	11,454
5	Proodeftiki	10,603
6	Aris	8,820
7	PAOK	6,915
8	Panionios	6,394
9	Trikala	5,647
10	Apollon Athens	5,472
11	Iraklis	4,900
12	Doxa Drama	4,197
13	Apollon Kalamarias	3,656
14	Niki Volos	3,455
15	Panegialios	2,676
16	Pierikos	2,666
