= Miloje Petković =

Serbian footballer

Personal information
- Date of birth: 31 January 1967 (age 59)
- Place of birth: SFR Yugoslavia
- Position: Midfielder

Senior career*
Years	Team	Apps	(Gls)
1990–1991	Vojvodina	31	(1)
1992–1993	OFK Kikinda	33	(5)
1993–1998	Veria	148	(31)
1998–1999	APOEL	22	(4)
1999–2001	Apollon Athens	57	(3)

Managerial career
- 2007: Veria (assistant)
- 2011–2012: Diagoras (assistant)
- 2013–2014: Veria (assistant)
- * Club domestic league appearances and goals

Miloje Petković (Serbian Cyrillic: Милоје Петковић; born 31 January 1967) is a Serbian retired footballer who played as a midfielder.

== Club career ==
Petković played football with FK Vojvodina in the Yugoslav First League.

Petković moved to Greece in July 1993, initially joining Greek second division side Veria F.C. He would spend three seasons with the club in the second division before they were promoted to the Greek first division after the 1995–96 season. He would spend two more years with the club playing the top division. In total, Petković made 61 appearances in the Greek top flight.

The 1998-99 season, he signed with Cypriot First division club APOEL, where he helped his team to win the Cypriot Cup. He joined Apollon Athens on a 1.5 year contract at age 33 in December 1999.

Following his retirement, he was shortly hired as a co-coach by Veria in 2007. and by Diagoras F.C. from Rhodes in 2011. where he cooperate with famous Serbian coach Ratko Dostanić.
