= Odysseas Kordelio F.C. =

- Full name: Odysseas Kordelio Football Club
- Nickname: Kordeliotes
- Founded: 1947; 79 years ago
- Ground: Kordelio Stadium
- Capacity: 700
- Chairman: Nikolaos Demertzis
- Manager: Iordanis Cholidis
- League: Macedonia FCA Second Division
- 2025–26: Macedonia FCA Third Division (Group 1), 1st (promoted)
Home colours	Away colours

Odysseas Kordelio Football Club is a Greek football club, based in Eleftherio-Kordelio, Evosmos, Thessaloniki. The colors of the club are blue and white. The club’s home ground is Odysseas Kordelio Stadium. It has competed for a total of 8 seasons in the professional national divisions of Greece (1 season in the Beta Ethniki and 7 seasons in the Gamma Ethniki).

== Honours ==
- Delta Ethniki (2): 1992, 2012
- Macedonia FCA A & A1 Division (3): 1978, 1988, 2010
- Macedonia FCA Cup (2): 1998, 2011
