= Pontioi Veria F.C. =

Pontioi Veria
- Full name: Pontioi Veria Football Club
- Founded: 1984; 42 years ago
- Ground: Municipal Stadium of Rahia
- Capacity: 300
- Chairman: Fotis Gaitatzis
- Manager: Dimitris Christoforidis
- League: Imathia FCA First Division
- 2025–26: Imathia FCA First Division, 9th
- Website: http://aep-verias.blogspot.gr
Home colours	Away colours

Pontioi Veria Football Club (Greek: Αθλητική Ένωση Ποντίων Βέροιας) is a football club based in Rachia, Imathia, Greece. The club was founded in 1984. Last season Pontioi Veroias remained at Imathia FCA First Division league as they finished 9th.

== History ==
Pontioi's best campaign happened during 1992–93 season in Beta Ethniki where they finished at 10th position. They were earlier promoted from Gamma Ethniki, during 1991–92 season as champions in Gamma Ethniki. That position is their best till today. The following season (1993–94) Pontioi finished at 12th position and in season 1994–95 they got relegated to Gamma Ethniki and they'd never return to professional level till today.

== Notable players ==
- (Greece) Pantelis Kafes
- (Greece) Andreas Niniadis
- (Greece) Ilias Atmatzidis
- (Greece) Nikos Dabizas

== Honours ==
=== Domestic Titles and honours ===
  - Gamma Ethniki: 1
    - 1991–92
  - Delta Ethniki: 1
    - 1988–89
  - Imathia FCA First Division: 4
    - 1986–87, 1998–99, 2001–02, 2011–12
  - Imathia FCA Cup: 4
    - 1987–88, 1988–89, 1997–98, 1998–99
