= Charavgiakos F.C. =

Greek football club

Charavgiakos
- Founded: 1949; 77 years ago
- Ground: Ilioupoli Municipal Stadium
- Capacity: 2,000
- Chairman: Evangelos Kounelis
- Manager: Spyros Gikas
- League: Athens FCA Second Division
- 2025–26: Athens FCA First Division, 12th (relegated)
Home colours

Charavgiakos Football Club (Greek: Α.Ο. Χαραυγιακός Ηλιούπολης) is a Greek football club based in Ilioupoli, Central Athens, Greece.

== Honours ==
=== Domestic ===
  - Gamma Ethniki Champion (1):
    - 1985–86
  - Delta Ethniki Champion (1):
    - 1983–84
  - Athens FCA Champions (4):
    - 1982–83, 2012–13, 2016–17, 2017–18
