= Naoussa F.C. =

FAS Naousa
- Full name: Φιλοπροοδευτικός Αθλητικός Σύλλογος Νάουσα (Filoproodeftikos Athletic Club Naoussa)
- Nickname: Κυανόλευκοι Kyanolefkoi; (The Blue-Whites)
- Founded: 5 August 1962; 64 years ago
- Ground: Municipal Stadium of Naousa
- Capacity: 3,000
- Chairman: Antonis Argyrakis
- Manager: Dimitrios Votaris
- League: Gamma Ethniki
- 2025–26: Imathia FCA First Division, 1st (promoted)
| Home colours | Away colours |

Naousa F.C. or F.A.S. Naousa (Greek: Φ.Α.Σ. Νάουσα) is a Greek professional football club based in Naousa, Imathia.

== History ==
The club was established on 5 August 1962 as product of the merger between Olympiakos Naoussa and Pannaoussaikos. Naoussa has spent one season in the first tier and 24 seasons in the second tier of Greek football.

Naoussa played its only season in the Alpha Ethniki in 1993–94, finishing in last place.

On 8 August 2022, Naoussa merged with Gamma Ethniki side Asteras Tripotamos, a team that won promotion to Gamma Ethniki last season but decided not to participate in the league, and will participate in 2022–23 Gamma Ethniki under Naoussa's name and colors. Naoussa's main financial sponsor in this new era is Petros Arampatzis.

In the 2025–26 season, Naoussa won the Imathia FCA First Division championship, earning promotion back to the Gamma Ethniki after an eight-year absence.

== League and Cup history ==
| Season | | Pos. | Pl. | W | D | L | GS | GA | P | Greek Cup | Notes |
|---|---|---|---|---|---|---|---|---|---|---|---|
| 1992–93 | Beta Ethniki | 1 (C) | 34 | 18 | 9 | 7 | 59 | 40 | 63 | Second Round | |
| 1993–94 | Alpha Ethniki | 18 (R) | 34 | 5 | 3 | 26 | 38 | 76 | 18 | Second Round | |
| 2010–11 | Delta Ethniki (Group 3) | 2 | - | - | - | - | - | - | - | Ineligible | |
| 2012–13 | Delta Ethniki (Group 3) | 2 (P) | - | - | - | - | - | - | - | Ineligible | |
| 2013–14 | Football League 2 (Group 3) | 10 (R) | 28 | 9 | 11 | 8 | 41 | 37 | 38 | Ineligible | |
| 2014–15 | A1 Imathia FCA | - | - | - | - | - | - | - | - | Ineligible | |
| 2022–23 | Gamma Ethniki | TBP | - | - | - | - | - | - | - | TBP | |

== Honours ==
=== Domestic ===
League

- Second Division
  - Winners (1): 1992–93
- Third Division
  - Winners (1): 1990–91
- Imathia FCA First Division
  - Winners (4): 2002–03, 2008–09, 2015–16, 2025–26
- Central-Western Macedonia FCA First Division
  - Winners (3): 1962–63, 1968–69, 1970–71

Cup

- Imathia FCA Cup
  - Winners (6): 2004–05, 2007–08, 2009–10, 2023–24, 2024–25, 2025–26
