= Doxa Vyronas F.C. =

Doxa Vyronas
- Full name: Ποδοσφαιρικός Αθλητικός Όμιλος Δόξα Βύρωνα (Football Athletic Club Doxa Vyronas)
- Nickname: Doxa (Glory)
- Founded: 1945; 81 years ago
- Ground: Vyronas National Stadium
- Capacity: 4,500
- Investor: Adam Green
- Chairman: Adam Green
- Manager: Loukas Ropas
- League: Gamma Ethniki
- 2025–26: Gamma Ethniki (Group 5), 7th
- Website: https://www.doxavironos.gr/
| Home colours | Away colours |

Doxa Vyronas (Greek: Π.Α.Ο. Δόξα Βύρωνος; lit. 'Glory of Vyronas') is a football club based in Vyronas, an eastern suburb of Athens, Greece. The club, established in 1945, competes in Gamma Ethniki. Doxa use Municipal Stadium of Vyronas as the venue for their home matches.

== History ==
Doxa Vyronas was founded in 1945. Club's shirt colour is blue. Its founders were Holopoulos and Panagiotis Ioannou. The first home ground of the club's football team was Anagnostopoulos Ground, in the district of Amygdalies, just behind the shooting-field. The club first participated in the official local championships of Athens in 1949-1950 (EPSA 3d Division). Doxa was promoted to Beta Ethniki for the first time in 1963, with Patrinos being the club’s chairman. That season they defeated 1-0 Panachaiki in Patras. In 1974-75 Doxa returned to Beta Ethniki.

In 1980, under the guidance and financial support of chairman Staikos, Doxa managed to emerge from the amateur championships and gradually reach the Beta Ethniki professional division in 1992-93 and from 1994 to 1999. Since then, and after the retreat of Staikos from the administration of the club causing severe financial problems, Doxa were rapidly relegated level after level all the way down to the lowest division of Athens Local Championships (EPSA 3d Division). Finally, after almost one decade in the amateur leagues of Athens, Doxa managed to take part in 2007-08 season of Delta Ethniki, after a successful merger with Proteas Palea Fokea. The club from Palea Fokea, Southern Attica, was dissolved thus letting its league position to the “blues” from Vyronas.

== Honours ==
=== Domestic ===
==== League titles ====
- Gamma Ethniki

Winners (2): 1990–91, 1994–95

- Delta Ethniki

Winners (1): 1988–89

- Athens FCA Championship

Winners (2): 2012–13, 2024–25

==== Cups ====
- Athens FCA Cup

Winners (1): 1988–89
