= E.A. Rethymniakou =

EAR
- Full name: Ένωση Ατρομήτου Ρεθυμνιακού; Énosi Atromítou Rethymniakoú (Atromitos − Rethymniakos Union)
- Short name: EAR
- Founded: 1983
- Dissolved: 1999
- Ground: Sochora Stadium; Rethymno
- Capacity: 2,500
Home colours	Away colours

Enosi Atromitou Rethymniakou, more commonly known as EAR, was a Greek football club based in Rethymno, Crete and was part of the EAR multi-sport club. Throughout its history of 16 years, the club played nine seasons in Beta Ethniki, the second tier of the Greek football league system and came very close to promote to top tier during the 1993–94 season, a feat that has never been matched by other Rethymno clubs to this day. EAR eventually shutdown the football department in 1999.

== History ==
The club was founded in 1983 after a merger between the former regional clubs Atromitos, which was founded in the 1920s, and was one of the four founding members of the Rethymno Football Clubs Association and A.O. Rethymno, who were themselves established in 1967 through the merger of older clubs Rethymniakos, Neos Asteras Rethymno and Neos Keravnos by the order of Rethymno military authorities.

EAR promoted to Beta Ethniki in 1987–88 season after defeating Irodotos in a decisive play-off game. Then, the club played for 9 seasons in Beta Ethniki (2nd-tier). In 1994 the club reached very close to promotion to A Ethniki but finished in the 4th place. It was the most successful season of the club. The following years, EAR declined. In season 1996–97 was relegated to Gamma Ethniki and in 1999 the club was dissolved. Famous players who have played in EAR are Dimitris Pittas, Pavlos Dermitzakis and others.

== Track and Field section ==
Enosi Atromitou Rethymniakou has also a Track and Field section. The club took over the organization of famous international athletics meeting named Vardinogianneia.
