= List of PAS Giannina F.C. managers =

The following is a list of managers of PAS Giannina FC.

== Managerial history ==
The complete list of PAS Giannina managers is shown in the following table:

Name	Nationality	From	To	Matches	Won	Drawn	Lost	Win%	Honours	Notes
Kostas Choumis	Greece	1966	1966	(n/a)	(n/a)	(n/a)	(n/a)	(n/a)		
Konstantinos Kokkas	Greece	1966	1966	(n/a)	(n/a)	(n/a)	(n/a)	(n/a)		
Adam Pitsioudis	Greece	1966	1967	(n/a)	(n/a)	(n/a)	(n/a)	(n/a)		
Christoforidis	Greece	1967	1968	(n/a)	(n/a)	(n/a)	(n/a)	(n/a)		
Chrisochoou	Greece	1968	1969	(n/a)	(n/a)	(n/a)	(n/a)	(n/a)		
Karalazos	Greece	1969	1969	(n/a)	(n/a)	(n/a)	(n/a)	(n/a)		
Panagiotis Deligiorgis	Greece	1969	1970	(n/a)	(n/a)	(n/a)	(n/a)	(n/a)		
Adam Pitsioudis	Greece	1970	1971	(n/a)	(n/a)	(n/a)	(n/a)	(n/a)		
Giannis Papantoniou	Greece	1971	1971	(n/a)	(n/a)	(n/a)	(n/a)	(n/a)		
Gómez de Faria	Portugal	1971	1973	(n/a)	(n/a)	(n/a)	(n/a)	(n/a)		
Nikos Alefantos	Greece	1/7/1973	24/3/1974	(n/a)	(n/a)	(n/a)	(n/a)	(n/a)		
Eduardo Rigani	Argentina	1974	1974	(n/a)	(n/a)	(n/a)	(n/a)	(n/a)	Promotion to SL	
Antonis Georgiadis	Greece	1974	1976	(n/a)	(n/a)	(n/a)	(n/a)	(n/a)		
Dobromir Zhechev	Bulgaria	1976	1977	(n/a)	(n/a)	(n/a)	(n/a)	(n/a)		
Antonis Georgiadis	Greece	1977	1979	(n/a)	(n/a)	(n/a)	(n/a)	(n/a)		
Nikos Alefantos	Greece	1/7/1979	1979	(n/a)	(n/a)	(n/a)	(n/a)	(n/a)		
Pavlos Tzamakos	Greece	1979	1979	(n/a)	(n/a)	(n/a)	(n/a)	(n/a)		
Giorgos Siontis	Greece	1979	1979	(n/a)	(n/a)	(n/a)	(n/a)	(n/a)		
Jacek Gmoch	Poland	1 December 1979	30 June 1981	(n/a)	(n/a)	(n/a)	(n/a)	(n/a)		
Giorgos Siontis	Greece	1981	1982	(n/a)	(n/a)	(n/a)	(n/a)	(n/a)		
Petar Argirov	Bulgaria	1982	1983	(n/a)	(n/a)	(n/a)	(n/a)	(n/a)		
Andreas Karamanolakis	Greece	1983	1984	(n/a)	(n/a)	(n/a)	(n/a)	(n/a)		
Gerhard Prokop	Germany	1983	1984	(n/a)	(n/a)	(n/a)	(n/a)	(n/a)		
Giorgos Siontis	Greece	1983	1984	(n/a)	(n/a)	(n/a)	(n/a)	(n/a)		
Christos Archontidis	Greece	1 July 1984	30 June 1985	(n/a)	(n/a)	(n/a)	(n/a)	(n/a)	Promotion to SL	
Gerhard Prokop	Germany	1 July 1985	29 December 1986	(n/a)	(n/a)	(n/a)	(n/a)	(n/a)		
Takis Geitonas	Greece	30 December 1986	7 January 1987	(n/a)	(n/a)	(n/a)	(n/a)	(n/a)		Caretaker
Ab Fafié	Netherlands	7 January 1987	30 June 1987	(n/a)	(n/a)	(n/a)	(n/a)	(n/a)		
Kostas Karapatis	Greece	1987	1988	(n/a)	(n/a)	(n/a)	(n/a)	(n/a)		
Thomas Tsourlidas	Greece	1987	1988	(n/a)	(n/a)	(n/a)	(n/a)	(n/a)		
Stefanos Vasileiadis	Greece	1987	1988	(n/a)	(n/a)	(n/a)	(n/a)	(n/a)		
Giorgos Siontis	Greece	1987	1988	(n/a)	(n/a)	(n/a)	(n/a)	(n/a)		
Thanasis Loukanidis Takis Loukanidis	Greece	1988	1989	(n/a)	(n/a)	(n/a)	(n/a)	(n/a)		
Alfredo Glasmanis	Argentina Greece	1988	1989	(n/a)	(n/a)	(n/a)	(n/a)	(n/a)		
Pavlos Tzamakos	Greece	1988	1989	(n/a)	(n/a)	(n/a)	(n/a)	(n/a)		
Stavros Diamantopoulos	Greece	1 July 1989	23 April 1990	(n/a)	(n/a)	(n/a)	(n/a)	(n/a)		
Thanasis Dimitriadis	Greece	24 April 1990	8 June 1990	(n/a)	(n/a)	(n/a)	(n/a)	(n/a)	Promotion to SL	
Włodzimierz Lubański	Poland	9 June 1990	6 July 1990	0	0	0	0	-		
Tom Frivalski	Belgium Hungary	6 July 1990	6 September 1990	(n/a)	(n/a)	(n/a)	(n/a)	(n/a)		
Stefanos Vasileiadis	Greece	6 September 1990	14 September 1990	(n/a)	(n/a)	(n/a)	(n/a)	(n/a)		Caretaker
Petr Packert	Czech Republic	14 September 1990	2 June 1991	(n/a)	(n/a)	(n/a)	(n/a)	(n/a)		
Barry Hulshoff	Netherlands	1 July 1991	5 December 1991	(n/a)	(n/a)	(n/a)	(n/a)	(n/a)		
Stefanos Vasileiadis	Greece	5 December 1991	13 December 1991	(n/a)	(n/a)	(n/a)	(n/a)	(n/a)		Caretaker
Giorgos Siontis	Greece	13 December 1991	20 January 1992	(n/a)	(n/a)	(n/a)	(n/a)	(n/a)		
Thanasis Dimitriadis	Greece	24 January 1992	30 June 1992	(n/a)	(n/a)	(n/a)	(n/a)	(n/a)		
Anthimos Kapsis	Greece	1 July 1992	24 January 1993	(n/a)	(n/a)	(n/a)	(n/a)	(n/a)		
Lazaros Giotis	Greece	25 January 1993	30 June 1993	(n/a)	(n/a)	(n/a)	(n/a)	(n/a)		
Dragan Kokotović	Serbia	1 July 1993	19 February 1994	(n/a)	(n/a)	(n/a)	(n/a)	(n/a)		
Nikos Kirgios	Greece	19 February 1994	25 February 1994	(n/a)	(n/a)	(n/a)	(n/a)	(n/a)		Caretaker
Makis Katsavakis	Greece	25 February 1994	11 April 1994	(n/a)	(n/a)	(n/a)	(n/a)	(n/a)		
Vasilis Konstantinou	Greece	13 April 1994	30 June 1994	(n/a)	(n/a)	(n/a)	(n/a)	(n/a)		
Dobromir Zhechev	Bulgaria	1 July 1994	1 August 1994	0	0	0	0	-		
Takis Grammeniatis Dimitris Seitaridis	GreeceGreece	1 August 1994 1 August 1994	7 January 1995 14 September 1994	(n/a)	(n/a)	(n/a)	(n/a)	(n/a)		
Vasilis Papachristou	Greece	10 January 1995	30 June 1995	(n/a)	(n/a)	(n/a)	(n/a)	(n/a)		
Timo Zahnleiter	Germany	1 July 1995	10 January 1996	(n/a)	(n/a)	(n/a)	(n/a)	(n/a)		
Dimitris Seitaridis	Greece	10 January 1996	27 September 1996	(n/a)	(n/a)	(n/a)	(n/a)	(n/a)		
Thanasis Dimitriadis	Greece	27 September 1996	12 March 1997	(n/a)	(n/a)	(n/a)	(n/a)	(n/a)		
Vasilis Papachristou	Greece	12 March 1997	30 June 1998	(n/a)	(n/a)	(n/a)	(n/a)	(n/a)	Promotion to Second Division	
Makis Katsavakis	Greece	1 July 1998	29 October 1998	(n/a)	(n/a)	(n/a)	(n/a)	(n/a)		
Nikos Kirgios	Greece	29 October 1998	3 November 1998	(n/a)	(n/a)	(n/a)	(n/a)	(n/a)		Caretaker
Nikos Anastopoulos	Greece	3 November 1998	3 May 1999	(n/a)	(n/a)	(n/a)	(n/a)	(n/a)		
Vasilis Papachristou	Greece	3 May 1999	30 June 1999	(n/a)	(n/a)	(n/a)	(n/a)	(n/a)		
Andreas Michalopoulos	Greece	1 July 1999	15 February 2000	(n/a)	(n/a)	(n/a)	(n/a)	(n/a)		
Giorgos Foiros	Greece	15 February 2000	30 June 2000	(n/a)	(n/a)	(n/a)	(n/a)	(n/a)	Promotion to SL	
Georgios Paraschos	Greece	26 June 2000	11 January 2001	(n/a)	(n/a)	(n/a)	(n/a)	(n/a)		
Andreas Bonovas	Greece	11 January 2001	13 January 2001	1	0	0	1	0		Caretaker
Nikos Kovis	Greece	13 January 2001	29 January 2001	(n/a)	(n/a)	(n/a)	(n/a)	(n/a)		
Nikos Anastopoulos	Greece	29 January 2001	30 June 2001	(n/a)	(n/a)	(n/a)	(n/a)	(n/a)		
Stavros Mentis	Greece	1 July 2001	20 August 2001	(n/a)	(n/a)	(n/a)	(n/a)	(n/a)		
Horacio Cordero	Argentina	20 August 2001	23 September 2001	(n/a)	(n/a)	(n/a)	(n/a)	(n/a)		
Giorgos Foiros	Greece	24 September 2001	22 May 2002	(n/a)	(n/a)	(n/a)	(n/a)	(n/a)	Promotion to SL	
Giorgos Vazakas	Greece	1 June 2002	7 June 2002	0	0	0	0	-		
Vasilis Papachristou	Greece	1 July 2002	5 November 2002	(n/a)	(n/a)	(n/a)	(n/a)	(n/a)		
Nikos Anastopoulos	Greece	8 November 2002	30 June 2003	(n/a)	(n/a)	(n/a)	(n/a)	(n/a)		
Pantelis Kolokas	Greece	1 July 2003	7 August 2003	(n/a)	(n/a)	(n/a)	(n/a)	(n/a)		Caretaker
Bo Petersson	Sweden	7 August 2003	12 January 2004	(n/a)	(n/a)		(n/a)	(n/a)		
Sotiris Zavogiannis	Greece	12 January 2004	15 January 2004	(n/a)	(n/a)	(n/a)	(n/a)	(n/a)		Caretaker
Jemal Gugushvili	Georgia	15 January 2004	1 April 2004	(n/a)	(n/a)	(n/a)	(n/a)	(n/a)		
Goderdzi Natroshvili	Georgia	11 February 2004	1 April 2004	(n/a)	(n/a)	(n/a)	(n/a)	(n/a)		
Pantelis Kolokas	Greece	1 April 2004	18 April 2004	(n/a)	(n/a)	(n/a)	(n/a)	(n/a)		Caretaker
Thanasis Charisis	Greece	22 April 2004	30 June 2004	(n/a)	(n/a)	(n/a)	(n/a)	(n/a)		
Zoran Smileski	North Macedonia	1 July 2004	21 February 2005	18	12	2	4	66,6%		League
Zoran Smileski	North Macedonia	1 July 2004	21 February 2005	2	0	1	1	0%		Cup
Giorgos Ladias	Greece	21 February 2005	23 February 2005	1	1	0	0	100%		League, Caretaker
Petros Michos	Greece	23 February 2005	10 April 2005	6	2	2	2	33,3%		League
Giorgos Ladias	Greece	10 April 2005	30 June 2005	7	5	1	1	71,4%		League
Vasilis Xanthopoulos	Greece	1 July 2005	26 October 2005	5	4	1	0	80%		League
Vasilis Xanthopoulos	Greece	1 July 2005	26 October 2005	3	2	0	1	66,6%		Cup
Giorgos Ladias	Greece	26 October 2005	12 January 2006	9	6	2	1	66,6%		League
Ioannis Gounaris	Greece	13 January 2006	4 August 2006	16	10	5	1	62,5%	Promotion to Second Division	League
Nikos Anastopoulos	Greece	5 August 2006	15 January 2007	15	6	5	4	40%		League
Nikos Anastopoulos	Greece	5 August 2006	15 January 2007	4	3	1	0	75%		Cup
Giannis Papakostas	Greece	15 January 2007	13 June 2007	19	8	6	5	42,1%		League
Giannis Papakostas	Greece	15 January 2007	13 June 2007	4	1	0	3	25%		Cup
Georgios Chatzaras	Greece	13 June 2007	2 March 2008	17	9	4	4	52,9%		League
Georgios Chatzaras	Greece	13 June 2007	2 March 2008	1	0	0	1	0%		Cup
Periklis Amanatidis	Greece	4 March 2008	29 May 2008	16	7	4	5	43,7%		League
Thanasis Charisis	Greece	29 May 2008	30 June 2008	1	0	1	0	0%		League, Caretaker
Nikos Anastopoulos	Greece	23 June 2008	30 June 2008	0	0	0	0	-		
Guillermo Ángel Hoyos	Argentina	1 July 2008	29 April 2009	31	19	7	5	61,3%	Promotion to SL	League
Guillermo Ángel Hoyos	Argentina	1 July 2008	29 April 2009	2	1	0	1	50%		Cup
Miltos Mastoras	Greece	29 April 2009	25 May 2009	3	1	2	0	33,3%		League, Caretaker
Georgios Paraschos	Greece	1 July 2009	6 December 2009	13	2	5	6	15,3%		League
Georgios Paraschos	Greece	1 July 2009	6 December 2009	1	1	0	0	100%		Cup
Thimios Georgoulis	Greece	6 December 2009	13 January 2010	4	2	1	1	50%		League, Caretaker
Nikos Anastopoulos	Greece	14 January 2010	1 June 2010	13	3	1	9	23%		League
Nikos Anastopoulos	Greece	14 January 2010	1 June 2010	4	2	1	1	50%		Cup
Stéphane Demol	Belgium	1 June 2010	23 November 2011	44	25	12	7	56,8%	Promotion to SL	League
Stéphane Demol	Belgium	1 June 2010	23 November 2011	3	2	0	1	66,6%		Cup
Giannis Christopoulos	Greece	23 November 2011	4 December 2011	2	0	1	1	0%		League, Caretaker
Angelos Anastasiadis	Greece	4 December 2011	8 June 2012	18	7	3	8	38,8%		League
Angelos Anastasiadis	Greece	4 December 2011	8 June 2012	2	1	0	1	50%		Cup
Giannis Christopoulos	Greece	8 June 2012	11 June 2013	36	14	9	13	38,8%		League+Play-offs
Giannis Christopoulos	Greece	8 June 2012	11 June 2013	6	4	0	2	66,6%		Cup
Savvas Pantelidis	Greece	24 June 2013	31 October 2013	9	3	2	4	33,3%		League
Savvas Pantelidis	Greece	24 June 2013	31 October 2013	2	0	1	1	0%		Cup
Giorgos Georgoulopoulos	Greece	31 October 2013	5 November 2013	1	1	0	0	100%		League, Caretaker
Sakis Tsiolis	Greece	5 November 2013	22 January 2014	10	3	0	7	30%		League
Giorgos Georgoulopoulos	Greece	22 January 2014	28 January 2014	1	0	0	1	0%		League, Caretaker
Giannis Petrakis	Greece	28 January 2014	8 May 2019	167	52	54	61	31,1%		League
Giannis Petrakis	Greece	28 January 2014	8 May 2019	27	12	6	9	17,9%		Cup
Giannis Petrakis	Greece	28 January 2014	8 May 2019	4	1	0	3	25%		Europa League
Argirios Giannikis	Greece	8 June 2019	19 May 2021	53	24	12	17	45%	Promotion to SL	League
Argirios Giannikis	Greece	8 June 2019	19 May 2021	11	7	2	2	64%		Cup
Iraklis Metaxas	Greece	3 June 2021	7 June 2022	35	11	10	14	31%		League
Iraklis Metaxas	Greece	3 June 2021	7 June 2022	1	0	0	1	0%		Cup
Thanasis Staikos	Greece	13 March 2022	13 March 2022	1	0	0	1	0%		League, Caretaker
Thanasis Staikos	Greece	7 June 2022	18 December 2023	47	8	18	21	17%		League
Thanasis Staikos	Greece	7 June 2022	18 December 2023	2	0	0	2	0%		Cup
Michalis Grigoriou	Greece	18 December 2023	23 April 2024	17	2	5	10	11,76%		League
Giorgos Georgoulopoulos	Greece	23 April 2024	11 May 2024	2	1	1	0	50%		League, Caretaker
René Poms	Austria	15 July 2024	21 October 2024	5	3	1	1	60%		League
René Poms	Austria	15 July 2024	21 October 2024	3	2	0	1	66,6%		Cup
Vagelis Tziarras	Greece	21 October 2024	27 October 2024	1	0	0	1	0%		League, Caretaker
Ariel Galeano	Paraguay	26 October 2024	6 February 2025	11	5	5	1	45,5%		League
Vagelis Tziarras	Greece	20 December 2025	20 December 2025	1	0	1	0	0%		League, Caretaker
Nikos Badimas	Greece	6 February 2025	3 May 2025	7	2	3	2	28,6%		Play-offs
Vagelis Tziarras	Greece	12 April 2025	12 April 2025	1	0	0	1	0%		Play-offs, Caretaker
Alexandros Tatsis	Greece	11 August 2025	20 August 2025	1	0	0	1	0%		Cup, Caretaker
Nikos Koustas	Greece	21 August 2025	16 November 2025	10	1	2	7	10%		League
Giannis Goumas	Greece	17 November 2025	27 April 2026	18	4	4	10	22,2%		League
Christos Raptis	Greece	12 June 2026								
