= History of PAS Giannina F.C. =

PAS Giannina
- Full name: Πανηπειρωτικός Αθλητικός Σύλλογος Γιάννινα (Panepirotic Athletic Club Giannina)
- Nickname: Άγιαξ της Ηπείρου (Ajax of Epirus)
- Short name: PAS
- Founded: 8 July 1966; 60 years ago
- Ground: Zosimades Stadium
- Capacity: 7,652
- Chairman: Napoleon Tsakanelis
- Manager: Christos Raptis
- League: Gamma Ethniki
- 2025–26: Super League Greece 2 (North Group), 8th (relegated)
- Website: https://pasgiannina.gr/
Home colours	Away colours	Third colours

PAS Giannina Football Club is a Greek football club based in the city of Ioannina, the capital of Epirus region.Part of the major multi-sport club PAS Giannina. The club is best known among Greek football fans for its loyal support and its status as the most successful football club in Epirus region.

== Formation and first steps (1966–1971) ==
PAS Giannina was formed in 1966 as a result of the union of the two local teams: AO Ioannina (merger of Atromitos Ioannina and Olympiacos Ioannina in 1962) and PAS Averof. As emblem of the new team was chosen the bull, as appeared on the ancient coin of the Epirote League.

PAS Giannina's first game was a 3–1 friendly win against Thyella Katsikas in September 1966. The first official match was for the Greek Cup against Pindos Konitsas on 2 October 1966. The result was 4–0 for PAS Giannina.

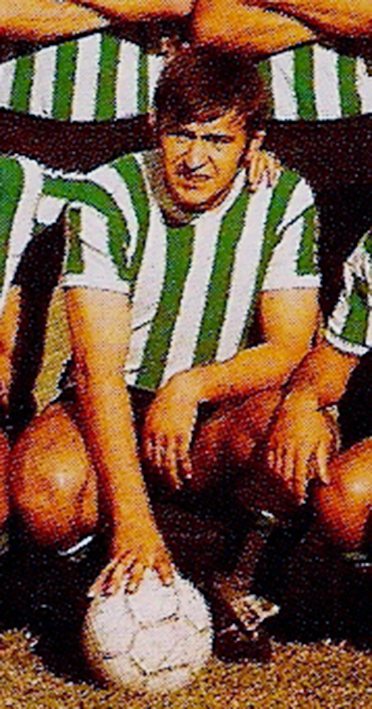
Óscar Álvarez he played four years for PAS Giannina

PAS Giannina was a mid-table club of the Second Division until 1971. In 1966–67, the club finished 6th. In 1967–68, it finished 10th. In 1968–69, it finished 5th. In 1969–70, it finished 7th. In 1970–71, it finished 13th.

== The rise of "Ajax of Epirus" (1971–1983) ==
In 1971 the Portuguese Gómez de Faria was signed as manager. In 1971–72, PAS Giannina finished 13th. In the middle of the season, three Argentine players were signed: Alfredo Glasman, Jose Pasternac and Eduardos Kontogeorgakis (who is Eduardo Rigani's son). At the end of the season, three more Argentine players were signed: Juan Montes, Oscar Alvarez and Eduardo Lisa. PAS Giannina was in the race for promotion. In 1972–73, the club finished second. In 1973–74, it finished first and was promoted to the First division.

PAS Giannina competed in the First Division for ten consecutive seasons. The club finished several times near the top of the First Division table, often earning victories over more established Greek teams such as Olympiacos, Panathinaikos, AEK Athens and PAOK. The effective and spirited play of the club during these years drew flattering comparisons with the famous Dutch club Ajax Amsterdam, and the moniker "Ajax of Epirus" has stuck with the team ever since.

In 1974–75 PAS Giannina finished 9th. In 1975–76, PAS Giannina finished 5th for the first time. This position is the record high for the club. In 1976–77, it finished 11th. In 1977–78, the club finished 5th again. The club qualified for the Balkans Cup for the first time in its history. In 1978–79, it finished 14th. In 1979–80, it finished 6th. In the middle of the season, former Poland national team coach Jacek Gmoch was signed from the Epirote club. It was a brief but a reasonably successful tenure. In 1980–81, it finished 11th. In 1981–82, it finished 14th. In 1982–83, it finished 9th.

== In the doldrums (1983–1997) ==
The period following the aforementioned peak years of the club generally marked a sharp decline in the fortunes of it as many of its top stars moved on or retired outright without being satisfactorily replaced. In 1983–84, PAS Giannina finished 15th. It was in a tie with Panionios. There was a play out match in Larissa between the two clubs. Panionios won the match 2–0. PAS Giannina relegated in the Second Division. In 1984–85, the club finished first in the Second Division and was promoted to the First Division. In 1985–86, it finished 13th. In 1986–87, it finished 16th and was relegated to the Second Division

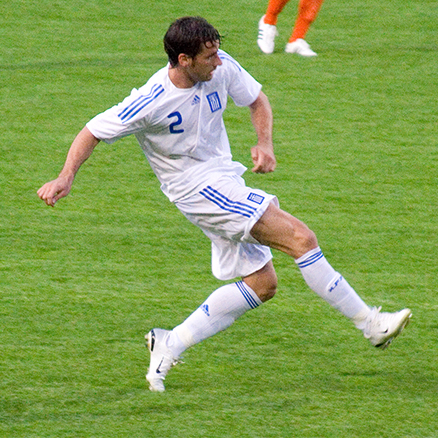
Giourkas Seitaridis international Euro 2004 Champion with Greece, played for PAS Giannina F.C. from 1998 to 2001

In 1987–88, it finished 12th. In 1988–89, it finished 4th. The club qualified for the promotion playoffs with Ethnikos Piraeus, Apollon Kalamarias, Korinthos, Diagoras and Veroia. It failed to get promoted. In 1989–90, it finished third and got promoted to the First Division. In 1990–91, the club finished 18th and was relegated to the Second Division. In 1991–92, the club finished 14th. In 1992–93, it finished 10th. PAS Giannina qualified for the Balkans Cup for the second time in its history. In 1993–94, it finished 5th. Also the club was runner up in the Balkans Cup 1993–94. In 1994–95, it finished 8th. In 1995–96, it finished 12th. In 1996–97, it finished 16th. PAS Giannina was relegated to the Third Division for the first time in its history.

== Comeback and a new crisis (1997–2004) ==
PAS Giannina was in the Third Division for the first time in its history. In 1997–98, it finished first and got promoted to the Second division. In 1998–99, it finished 4th, failing to get promoted to the First Division. In 1999–00, it finished third and qualified for the promotion playoffs with Egaleo and Panserraikos. PAS Giannina won Panserraikos 3–1 and draw with Egaleo 1–1. After that the club promoted to the First Division. In 2000–01, it finished 13th and qualified to the relegation playoffs. The club relegated after a 3-game playoff with OFI. In 2001–02, PAS Giannina finished first and promoted to the First Division.

PAS experienced a fair degree of instability in these years. In 2002–03, PAS Giannina finished 14th. After the penalty of 90 points the club finished 16th and relegated. The penalty of 90 points imposed on it by the Greek football association (EPO) for financial reasons. There were a lot of financial problems in season 2003–04. The club finished 14th and qualified to playout with Ilisiakos. The club lost 3–1 and relegated in the Third division for the second time in its history. The club turned on a semi-professional status.

== Semi-finals Of Greek Cup (2004–2010) ==
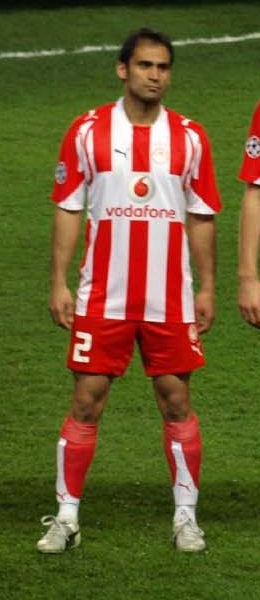
Christos Patsatzoglou, played for PAS Giannina F.C. from 2010 to 2013

The control of the club switched over to attorney Alexis Kougias. In 2004–05, the club finished second and failed to get promoted. In 2005–06 it finished second and got promoted to Second Division. In 2006–07, PAS Giannina finished 5th. Also, PAS Giannina reached the semi-finals of the Greek Cup 2006–07 against AEL. PAS Giannina lost 2–0 both home and away match. On the quarter-final PAS Giannina won Olympiacos, 2–0 at home and lost 2–1 in Karaiskakis Stadium of an extra-time goal from Evangelos Kontogoulidis before a hostile crowd. PAS Giannina finished 4th in the Second Division in the 2007–08 season, failing to get promoted.

In the summer of 2008, ownership of the club was passed over to Giorgos Christovasilis, a businessman from Athens whose roots are from the Epirus region. He signed Guillermo Ángel Hoyos as manager and some great players such as Luciano. In the 2008–09 season, the club promoted as second in the Super League.

In the summer of 2009, the club signed players such as Dimitrios Eleftheropoulos, Ibrahima Bakayoko, Konstantinos Mendrinos, Ilias Kotsios. In 2009–10, the club finished 15th and got relegated one more time. On the other hand, the club was successful in the Greek Cup. PAS Giannina reached the semi-finals for the second time in its history. In the quarter-final PAS Giannina won PAOK 4–0 in Zosimades Stadium. In the semi-finals, the club lost from Panathinaikos on aggregate 2–4.

== Road to UEFA Europa League (2010–2017) ==
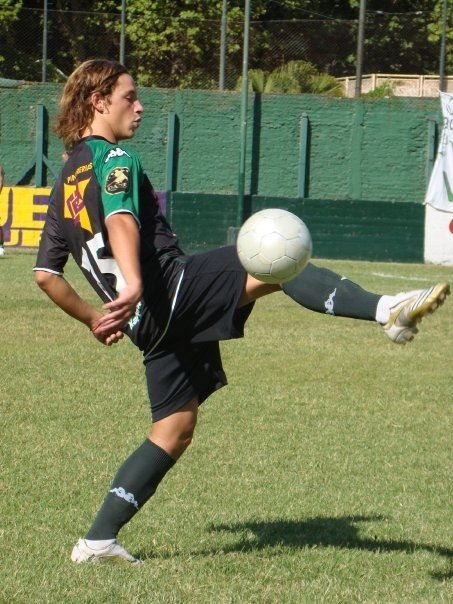
Tomás De Vincenti played for PAS Giannina F.C. from 2009 to 2013

In the 2010–11 season, PAS Giannina was promoted as second again to Super League. The club takes part in Super League every year. In 2011–12, PAS Giannina finished 8th. In 2012–13, PAS Giannina finished 5th and qualified for the playoffs with Atromitos, Asteras Tripolis and PAOK for the first time in its history.Also, Giannis Christopoulos won the best manager of the year award.

It started with 2 wins but at the end it finished 4th. The club qualified for Europa League. PAS Giannina were not licensed to play in the Europa League and therefore were replaced by the next Europa League licensed team in the table, not already qualified for any European competition, which was Skoda Xanthi. In 2013–14, the club finished 11th, a safe mid-table position. In 2014–15, the club finished 6th. Also that year, there were awards for the manager and two players. Giannis Petrakis won the best manager of the year award. Charis Charisis won the best young player of Greek Super League award and Markos Vellidis won the best goalkeeper award.

In 2015–16 the club finished 6th again. PAS Giannina qualified for UEFA Europa League 2016–17 because Panionios was excluded from participating in the 2016–17 European competitions by UEFA for financial reasons. The club qualified for European competitions, except Balkans Cup, for the first time in its history.

In 2016–17 the club takes part in the Super League. The club finished 9th. An important moment was the charity match for the refugees between the veterans of the club and FC Barcelona. The charity match and activities were organized by the Barça Players Association in collaboration with the United Nations High Commissioner for Refugees (UNHCR) and with the support of PAS Giannina FC.

=== Relegation and rebuild from scratch (2017–2022) ===
In 2017–18 the club finished 9th again in the Super League. Also, PAS Giannina reached the quarterfinals in the Greek Cup.

In 2018–19, after an awful season, PAS Giannina finished 14th and relegated to the Super League 2. There were many changes at the club. Petrakis left the club after years and a new manager, Argiris Giannikis was hired. Some players, with many years at the club, left it as well. Michail, Tzimopoulos, Lila, Giakos left the club. Some young players like Liasos, Lolis, Naumets took part at first 11. Also, Giorgos Dasios returned to the club as Director of Football. PAS Giannina was first when the championship was suspended. On 22 June 2020, it was announced that the ranking on 12 March 2020 is the final ranking. PAS Giannina won the Super League Greece 2 in the season 2019–20 and been the first team to win the new competition and the club was promoted to Super League 1.

In 2020–21 the club finished 8th on the regular season. It finished 9th after the end of play out. The team got into the semi-final of the Greek Cup in the season 2020–21 after beating Atromitos and Panathinaikos. PAS Giannina reached semi-finals for the third time in its history. In the semi-finals, the club lost from Olympiacos on aggregate 2–4, the only team considered capable to beat the in-form PAS Giannina side at the time by the Greek fans, many of whom considered the Epirus side the favorite to win in the final against either AEK or PAOK if qualified. The team consisted mainly of debutant players who were performing at their best such as Alexandros Kartalis, Christos Eleftheriadis, Nicolae Milinceanu etc.

== Legendary 2021–22 season and change of playing style ==

PAS Giannina 2021–22 Starting XI

In the 2021–22 season the club got 6th place in Super League Greece. In 2021–22 PAS Giannina finished 6th on the regular season and took part on play-off round, finishing 6th, as well. This was one of the clubs most successful campaigns mostly due to the defensive style of play used by the coach Iraklis Metaxas, using the containing 4-4-2 double six. Their defence was a result of chemistry, athleticism, leadership, playing abilities and passion from the goalkeeper, Yuri Lodygin who is regarded as the best goalkeeper to ever play for the Epirus side, and the defenders Peersman, Erramuspe, Kargas and Saliakas. Lodygin provided defensive security and stability, Erramuspe and Kargas displayed great leadership, fighting spirit, aerial ability, and ball playing skills, and with Peersman and Saliakas being two of the most consistent players throughout the whole season not only helped the team with their attacking runs, but were rock-solid on defence. On the midfield, PAS Giannina signing from Super League 2 club Levadiakos, Zisis Karachalios completed one of the best seasons of his career, alongside Domínguez for the first half of the season, and Caleb Stanko for the second half. Karachalios provided support in defence, helping the team with his very high work rate, stamina, strength, interceptions and steals, being ranked as the player with the most steals in Super League 1. Perea made a great season scoring 10 goals helping PAS Giannina on attack.

A historic match between PAS Giannina Veterans and Ajax Veterans took part on Zosimades Stadium, on July 6, 2022.

== Recently time ==
After the season 2021–22 the club start to change skin, the goalkeeper Yuri Lodygin moved to Panathinaikos and also players like Michael Gardawski, Antonis Ikonomopoulos, Marvin Peersman, Giannis Kargas, Jan-Marc Schneider, Fabricio Brener and Stefanos Siontis have been released. Manolis Saliakas has been sold to FC St. Pauli, also Juan José Perea was sold to VfB Stuttgart becoming the most expensive player sold by the blub of Ioannina.

In the 2022–23 season, Thanasis Staikos took over, after a rather controversial decision from the club president, signing an inexperienced coach. PAS Giannina finished 11th on the regular season and took part on play out round. It finished on 9th after the end of play out. PAS started the 2023–24 in a very promising way, after beating A.E. Kifisia by 3–0 in the opening match, and an away draw against Panetolikos. However, lack of defensive stability, poor tactics and serious goalkeeper errors, PAS suffered shocking losses against Panseraikos, Volos, Lamia and A.E. Kifisia. Eventually, after a 13 games winless streak, Staikos resigned, becoming the first manager in 10 years to be replaced mid-season.After an awful season PAS Giannina finished on 14th and relegated to Super League Greece 2.

In 2024–25, PAS had a mediocre run in the championship. It finished 3rd but it never managed to challenge for promotion. The club also changed two managers and finished the season with a caretaker manager. The owners imposed a payment freeze, leading to financial difficulties for the club. The club also received 7 transfer bans from FIFA. There was also a threat of the club dropping to the local amateur divisions. Negotiations took place regarding the transfer of ownership, but they failed to result in a deal. Just before the club's collapse, Nikos Siontis, the son of the team's former captain, stepped in to save the club. PAS also sold over 2,000 season tickets, despite the fact that it was still unclear whether the team would participate in the league and without having a squad in place. Even former players bought season tickets to support the club. The club also competed in the Greek Cup 2025–26 with only 12 players, mostly young, with the youngest being just 15 years old. Although there was no hope of winning, over 3,000 fans showed up at the stadium to support the team. The club reached agreements to restructure its debts, the transfer bans were removed, and it secured a license for the upcoming league.In 2025–26,PAS had a disappointing season and finished 9th in the regular season of the championship.In the play-outs, PAS managed only three wins and finished 4th, resulting in relegation to the Gamma Ethniki.The club continued to face financial difficulties throughout the season.
