= List of PAS Giannina F.C. records and statistics =

Records and statistics

This is a list of records and statistics related to the Greek association football Club PAS Giannina F.C.

== Transfer records ==
=== Transfer fee received ===
R.	Name	Fee	To	Year	Source
1	(Colombia) Juan José Perea	€2,200,000	(Germany) VfB Stuttgart	2022	
2	(Greece) Konstantinos Mavropanos	€2,100,000	(England) Arsenal	2018	
3	(Spain) Pedro Conde	€800,000	(United Arab Emirates) Baniyas	2018	
4	(Greece) Markos Vellidis	€750,000	(Greece) PAOK	2016	
5	(Greece) Leonardo Koutris	€600,000	(Greece) Olympiacos	2017	
6	(Greece) Marios Oikonomou	€500,000	(Italy) Cagliari	2013	
7	(Greece) Charis Charisis	€480,000	(Greece) PAOK	2015	
8	(Greece) Nikos Korovesis	€380,000	(Greece) PAOK	2012	
9	(Greece) Alexandros Nikolias	€300,000	(Greece) Olympiacos	2020	
10	(Greece) Giannis Kargas	€280,000	(Greece) PAOK	2022	
11	(Greece) Xenofon Gittas	€250,000	(Greece) Panathinaikos	2003	
12	(Greece) Dimitrios Kolovetsios	€250,000	(Greece) AEK Athens	2014	
13	(Greece) Giourkas Seitaridis	€172,000	(Greece) Panathinaikos	2001	
14	(Greece) Stavros Tsoukalas	€172,000	(Greece) Asteras Tripolis	2016	
15	(Greece) Georgios Kousas	€172,000	(Greece) Panetolikos	2017	
16	(Cameroon) Guy Feutchine	€100,000	(Greece) PAOK	2001	
17	(Togo) Paul Adado	€70,000	(Greece) Panserraikos	2008	
18	(The Gambia) Njogu Demba-Nyrén	€50,000	(Greece) Aris	2002	

=== Transfer fee paid ===
R.	Name	Fee	From	Year	Source
1	(Greece) Giorgos Margaritis	€220,000	(Greece) Agrotikos Asteras	2010	
2	(Albania) Foto Strakosha	€200,000	(Albania) Dinamo Tirana	1991	
3	(Morocco) Karim Fegrouche	€180,000	(Morocco) Wydad Casablanca	2011	
4	(Brazil) Fillip Rodrigues	€150,000	(Greece) Kallithea	2007	
5	(Argentina) Esteban Buján	€150,000	(Spain) Albacete	2008	
6	(Albania) Emiljano Vila	€120,000	(Albania) Dinamo Tirana	2011	
7	(Colombia) Juan José Perea	€100,000	(Greece) Panathinaikos	2021	
8	(Albania) Simo Rrumbullaku	€100,000	(Greece) Kalamata	2012	
9	(Argentina) Héctor Cuevas	€50,000	(Argentina) Belgrano	2011	
10	(Greece) Georgios Gougoulias	€50,000	(Greece) Panserraikos	2008	
11	(Greece) Alexandros Nikolias	€50,000	(Greece) Olympiacos Volos	2014	

== European competitions record ==
During the 2016–17 season, PAS Giannina competed on the UEFA Europa League qualifying rounds for the first time in the club's history. PAS Giannina finished 6th on the 2015–16 Super League Greece, which enabled him to participate, on the Second qualifying round.

=== PAS Giannina first european game ===
On the 21st of July 2016, PAS Giannina faced Odds BK in a full Zosimades Stadium with a total attendance of 5.615 spectators.

PAS Giannina captain Alexios Michail opened the score from inside the box after a corner kick taken by Noé Acosta on the 7th minute. PAS Giannina had total control of the game, and in the 31st minute Fonsi Nadales doubled his team lead with a great volley after a perfectly executed cross by Nikos Karanikas. On the second half, the goalkeeper Alexandros Paschalakis with a presice volley across the whole length of the pitch, spotted Dimitrios Ferfelis who took advantage of the opposition's defenders error and sprinted towards goal with Acosta trailing. Ferfelis' shot got blockeded by the goalkeeper, who couldn't handle the ball, and got served for Noé Acosta who scored to form the final score.

On the 2nd leg, about 500 PAS Giannina fans traveled to Norway to support their team. The away side managed to concede no goals on the first half, but conceded 3 goals on the second half, and the game was led to extra time. However, the Epirus side managed to score after a remarkable dribble fooling the opposition defenders from Christopher Maboulou, who let the ball pass beside him after a pass from Karanikas, to reach Leonardo Koutris who beat the goalkeeper, and formed the final score of 3–1 after extra time, and eventually led PAS Giannina to the Third qualifying round for the first time in the club's history.

Season	Competition	Round	Club	Home	Away	Aggregate
2016–17	Europa League	Second qualifying round	(Norway) Odds BK	3–0	3–1	4–3
2016–17	Europa League	Third qualifying round	(Netherlands) AZ Alkmaar	1–2	1–0	1–3

=== Balkans Cup ===
Season	Competition	Round	Club	Home	Away	Aggregate
1979–80	Balkans Cup	Group Stage	(Albania) Partizani	3–0	0–2	–
1979–80	Balkans Cup	Group Stage	(Socialist Federal Republic of Yugoslavia) NK Rijeka	1–3	1–2	–
1993–94	Balkans Cup	Semi-finals	(Albania) Besa	2–0	3–1	5–1
1993–94	Balkans Cup	Final	(Turkey) Samsunspor	0–2	0–3	0–5

== Honours and distinctions ==
Over the years, PAS Giannina have competed in the Super League for a total of 25 seasons (plus 2020–21). The club has never won the Super League or the Greek Cup, but it has won lower division titles throughout its history and represented Greece in the 1979–80 and 1993–94 Balkans Cup tournaments. During its history in the Super League, the club finished 3 times in the 5th position (1975–76, 1977–78, 2012–13 seasons) and 3 times in the 6th position (1979–80, 2014–15, 2015–16 seasons).

On 31 January 2007, PAS Giannina clinched a spot in the Greek Cup semi-finals by virtue of an extra-time goal from Evangelos Kontogoulidis before a hostile crowd in Karaiskakis Stadium. With an aggregate score of 3–2, PAS Giannina also is the first ever lower division club that eliminated Olympiacos from the Greek Cup tournament.

The most famous player to have donned the blue and white PAS Giannina's jersey in recent years is defender Giourkas Seitaridis, who later played for Panathinaikos, FC Porto, Dynamo Moscow, and Atlético Madrid as well as the triumphant Euro 2004 Greece squad.

=== Domestic competitions ===
- Super League (First Division)
  - 1975–76, 5th place: 30 games, 36 points, 15 wins, 6 draws, 9 defeats, goals 40–33
  - 1977–78, 5th place: 34 games, 38 points, 14 wins, 10 draws, 10 defeats, goals 45–39
  - 1979–80, 6th place: 34 games, 37 points, 14 wins, 9 draws, 11 defeats, goals 50–44
  - 2012–13, 5th place: 30 games, 44 points, 12 wins, 8 draws, 10 defeats, goals 28–24
  - 2014–15, 6th place: 34 games, 53 points, 13 wins, 14 draws, 7 defeats, goals 47–33
  - 2015–16, 6th place: 30 games, 42 points, 12 wins, 6 draws, 12 defeats, goals 36–40
  - 2021–22, 6th place: 36 games, 46 points, 12 wins, 10 draws, 14 defeats, goals 34–42
- Super League 2 (Second Division)
  - Champions (4): 1973–74, 1984–85, 2001–02, 2019–20
- Gamma Ethniki (Third Division)
  - Champions (1): 1997–98
- Greek Cup
  - Semi-Finals (3): 2006–07, 2009–10, 2020–21

=== International ===
- ''Balkans Cup
  - Runners-Up (1): 1993–94

=== Individual Player & Manager awards ===
- Best Manager in Greece
  - (Greece) Giannis Christopoulos: 2012–13
  - (Greece) Giannis Petrakis: 2014–15
- Best Young Player
  - (Greece) Charis Charisis: 2014–15
- Best Goalkeeper
  - (Greece) Markos Vellidis: 2014–15
  - (Russia) Yuri Lodygin: 2021–22
- Top Scorer of Greek Cup
  - (Greece) Georgios Pamlidis: 2019–20 (together with Dimitrios Pelkas)
  - (Spain) Pedro Conde: 2017–18 (together with Aleksandar Prijović, Lazaros Christodoulopoulos)
  - (Greece) Georgios Saitiotis: 2006–07 (together with Jozef Kožlej)
- Top Scorer of Beta Ethniki
  - (Ivory Coast) (France) Ibrahima Bakayoko: 2010–11

=== Super League Team of the Year ===
- (Greece) Leonardo Koutris: 2016–17
- (Greece) Markos Vellidis: 2014–15
- (Russia) Yuri Lodygin: 2021–22
- (Greece) Giannis Kargas: 2021–22
- (Greece) Manolis Saliakas: 2021–22
