= PAS Giannina F.C. =

Association football club in Greece

PAS Giannina
- Full name: Πανηπειρωτικός Αθλητικός Σύλλογος Γιάννινα (Panepirotic Athletic Club Giannina)
- Nickname: Άγιαξ της Ηπείρου (Ajax of Epirus)
- Short name: PAS
- Founded: 8 July 1966; 60 years ago
- Ground: Zosimades Stadium
- Capacity: 7,652
- Chairman: Charis Lazanis
- Manager: Christos Raptis
- League: Gamma Ethniki
- 2025–26: Super League Greece 2 (North Group), 8th (relegated)
- Website: fcpasgiannina.gr
Home colours	Away colours	Third colours

PAS Giannina Football Club (Greek: ΠΑΣ Γιάννινα), or with its full name Panipirotikós Athlitikós Síllogos Giánnina (Greek: Πανηπειρωτικός Αθλητικός Σύλλογος Γιάννινα, Panepirotic Athletic Club Giannina) is a Greek football club based in the city of Ioannina, the capital of Epirus region. Part of the major multi-sport club PAS Giannina. The club is best known among Greek football fans for its loyal support and its status as the most successful football club in Epirus region.

PAS Giannina was formed in 1966 as a result of the union of the two local teams: AO Ioanninon (union of Atromitos Ioanninon and Olympiacos Ioanninon in 1962) and PAS Averof. As emblem of the new team was chosen the bull, as appeared on the ancient coin of the Epirote League. The club have competed several times in the Super League. The club's best finish in the competition is 5th place on three occasions (1975–76, 1977–78, 2012–13). They have reached the semi-finals of the Greek Cup overall three times (2006–07, 2009–10, 2020–21). They have competed once in UEFA competitions and also participated in the Balkans Cup on two occasions.

== History ==
=== Early years (1966–1971) ===
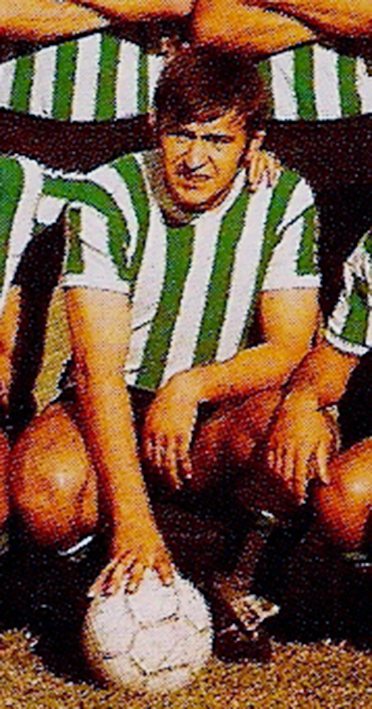
Óscar Álvarez he played four years for PAS Giannina

The first official match was for the Greek Cup against Pindos Konitsas on 2 October 1966. The result was 4–0 for PAS Giannina. PAS Giannina was a mid-table club of the Second Division until 1971. In 1966–67, the club finished 6th. In 1967–68, it finished 10th. In 1968–69, it finished 5th. In 1969–70, it finished 7th. In 1970–71, it finished 13th.

=== Rise of "Ajax of Epirus" (1971–1983) ===
In 1971, the Portuguese Gómez de Faria was signed as manager. In 1971–72, PAS Giannina finished 13th. In the middle of the season, three Argentine players were signed: Alfredo Glasman, Jose Pasternac and Eduardos Kontogeorgakis (who is Eduardo Rigani's son). At the end of the season, three more Argentine players were signed: Juan Montes, Oscar Alvarez and Eduardo Lisa. PAS Giannina was in the race for promotion. In 1972–73, the club finished second. In 1973–74, it finished first and was promoted to the First division.

PAS Giannina competed in the First Division for ten consecutive seasons. The club finished several times near the top of the First Division table, often earning victories over more established Greek teams such as Olympiacos, Panathinaikos, AEK Athens and PAOK. The effective and spirited play of the club during these years drew flattering comparisons with the famous Dutch club Ajax Amsterdam, and the moniker "Ajax of Epirus" has stuck with the team ever since.

In 1974–75, PAS Giannina finished 9th. In 1975–76, PAS Giannina finished 5th for the first time. This position is the record high for the club. In 1976–77, it finished 11th. In 1977–78, the club finished 5th again. The club qualified for the Balkans Cup for the first time in its history. In 1978–79, it finished 14th. In 1979–80, it finished 6th. In the middle of the season, former Poland national team coach Jacek Gmoch was signed from the Epirote club. It was a brief but a reasonably successful tenure. In 1980–81, it finished 11th. In 1981–82, it finished 14th. In 1982–83, it finished 9th.

=== In the doldrums (1983–1997) ===
The period following the aforementioned peak years of the club generally marked a sharp decline in the fortunes of it as many of its top stars moved on or retired outright without being satisfactorily replaced. In 1983–84, PAS Giannina finished 15th. It was in a tie with Panionios. There was a play out match in Larissa between the two clubs. Panionios won the match 2–0. PAS Giannina relegated in the Second Division. In 1984–85, the club finished first in the Second Division and was promoted to the First Division. In 1985–86, it finished 13th. In 1986–87, it finished 16th and was relegated to the Second Division

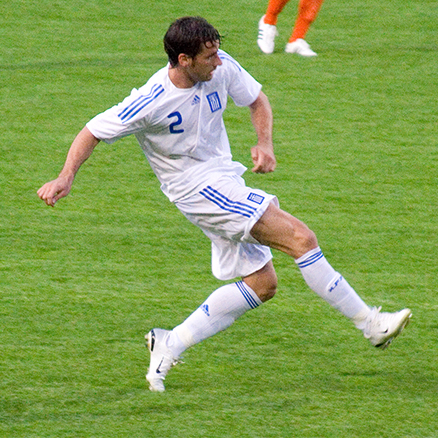
Giourkas Seitaridis international Euro 2004 Champion with Greece, played for PAS Giannina F.C. from 1998 to 2001

In 1987–88, it finished 12th. In 1988–89, it finished 4th. The club qualified for the promotion playoffs with Ethnikos Piraeus, Apollon Kalamarias, Korinthos, Diagoras and Veroia. It failed to get promoted. In 1989–90, it finished third and got promoted to the First Division. In 1990–91, the club finished 18th and was relegated to the Second Division. In 1991–92, the club finished 14th. In 1992–93, it finished 10th. PAS Giannina qualified for the Balkans Cup for the second time in its history. In 1993–94, it finished 5th. Also the club was runner up in the Balkans Cup 1993–94. In 1994–95, it finished 8th. In 1995–96, it finished 12th. In 1996–97, it finished 16th. PAS Giannina was relegated to the Third Division for the first time in its history.

=== Comeback and a new crisis (1997–2004) ===
PAS Giannina was in the Third Division for the first time in its history. In 1997–98, it finished first and got promoted to the Second division. In 1998–99, it finished 4th, failing to get promoted to the First Division. In 1999–00, it finished third and qualified for the promotion playoffs with Egaleo and Panserraikos. PAS Giannina won Panserraikos 3–1 and draw with Egaleo 1–1. After that the club promoted to the First Division. In 2000–01, it finished 13th and qualified to the relegation playoffs. The club relegated after a 3-game playoff with OFI. In 2001–02, PAS Giannina finished first and promoted to the First Division.

PAS experienced a fair degree of instability in these years. In 2002–03, PAS Giannina finished 14th. After the penalty of 90 points the club finished 16th and relegated. The penalty of 90 points was imposed on it by the Greek football association (EPO) for financial reasons. The financial problems continued in the 2003–04 season. The club finished 14th and qualified to playout with Ilisiakos. The club lost 3–1 and was relegated to the third division for the second time in its history. The club became semi-professional.

=== Semifinals of Greek Cup (2004–2010) ===
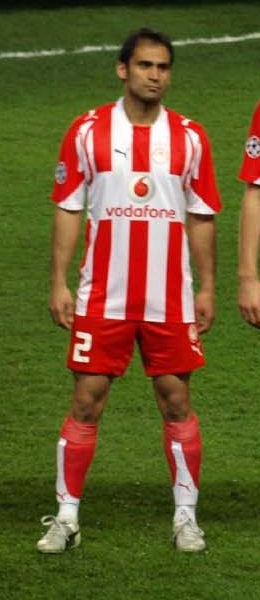
Christos Patsatzoglou, played for PAS Giannina F.C. from 2010 to 2013

The control of the club switched over to attorney Alexis Kougias. In 2004–05, the club finished second and failed to get promoted. In 2005–06 it finished second and got promoted to Second Division. In 2006–07, PAS Giannina finished 5th. Also, PAS Giannina reached the semifinals of the Greek Cup 2006–07 against AEL. PAS Giannina lost 2–0 both home and away match. On the quarter-final PAS Giannina won Olympiacos, 2–0 at home and lost 2–1 in Karaiskakis Stadium of an extra-time goal from Evangelos Kontogoulidis before a hostile crowd. PAS Giannina finished 4th in the Second Division in the 2007–08 season, failing to get promoted.

In the summer of 2008, ownership of the club was passed over to Giorgos Christovasilis, a businessman from Athens whose roots are from the Epirus region. He signed Guillermo Ángel Hoyos as manager and some great players such as Luciano. In the 2008–09 season, the club promoted as second in the Super League. In the summer of 2009, the club signed players such as Dimitrios Eleftheropoulos, Ibrahima Bakayoko, Konstantinos Mendrinos, Ilias Kotsios. In 2009–10, the club finished 15th and got relegated one more time. On the other hand, the club was successful in the Greek Cup. PAS Giannina reached the semifinals for the second time in its history. In the quarter final PAS Giannina won PAOK 4–0 in Zosimades Stadium. In the semifinals, the club lost from Panathinaikos on aggregate 2–4.

=== Road to UEFA Europa League (2010–2017) ===
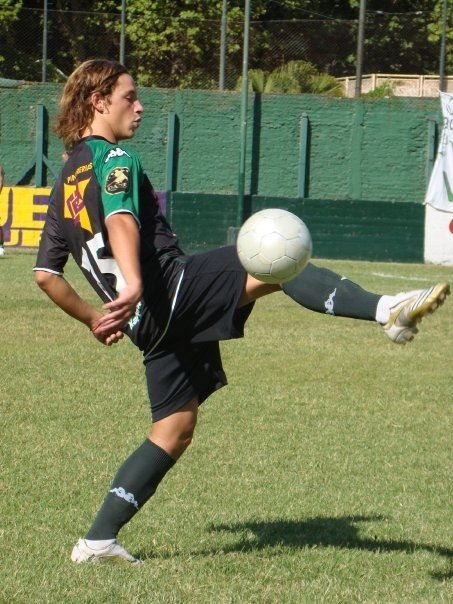
Tomás De Vincenti played for PAS Giannina F.C. from 2009 to 2013

In the 2010–11 season, PAS Giannina was promoted as second again to Super League. The club takes part in Super League every year. In 2011–12, PAS Giannina finished 8th. In 2012–13, PAS Giannina finished 5th and qualified for the playoffs with Atromitos, Asteras Tripolis and PAOK for the first time in its history.Also, Giannis Christopoulos won the best manager of the year award.

It started with 2 wins but at the end it finished 4th. The club qualified for Europa League. PAS Giannina were not licensed to play in the Europa League and therefore were replaced by the next Europa League licensed team in the table, not already qualified for any European competition, which was Skoda Xanthi. In 2013–14, the club finished 11th, a safe mid-table position. In 2014–15, the club finished 6th. Also that year, there were awards for the manager and two players. Giannis Petrakis won the best manager of the year award. Charis Charisis won the best young player of Super League Greece award and Markos Vellidis won the best goalkeeper award.

In 2015–16, the club finished 6th again. PAS Giannina qualified for UEFA Europa League 2016–17 because Panionios was excluded from participating in the 2016–17 European competitions by UEFA for financial reasons. The club qualified for European competitions, except Balkans Cup, for the first time in its history. In 2016–17, the club takes part in the Super League. The club finished 9th. An important moment was the charity match for the refugees between the veterans of the club and FC Barcelona. The charity match and activities were organized by the Barça Players Association in collaboration with the United Nations High Commissioner for Refugees (UNHCR) and with the support of PAS Giannina FC.

=== Relegation and rebuild from scratch (2017–2022) ===
In 2017–18, the club finished 9th again in the Super League. Also, PAS Giannina reached the quarterfinals in the Greek Cup. In 2018–19, after an awful season, PAS Giannina finished 14th and relegated to the Super League 2. There were many changes at the club. Petrakis left the club after years and a new manager, Argiris Giannikis was hired. Some players, with many years at the club, left it as well. Michail, Tzimopoulos, Lila, Giakos left the club. Some young players like Liasos, Lolis, Naumets took part at first 11. Also, Giorgos Dasios returned to the club as Director of Football. PAS Giannina was first when the championship was suspended. On 22 June 2020, it was announced that the ranking on 12 March 2020 is the final ranking. PAS Giannina won the Super League Greece 2 in the season 2019–20 and been the first team to win the new competition and the club was promoted to Super League 1.

In 2020–21, the club finished 8th on the regular season. It finished 9th after the end of play out. The team got into the semi-final of the Greek Cup in the season 2020-21 after beating Atromitos and Panathinaikos. PAS Giannina reached semi finals for the third time in its history. In the semifinals, the club lost from Olympiacos on aggregate 2–4, the only team considered capable to beat the in-form PAS Giannina side at the time by the Greek fans, many of whom considered the Epirus side the favorite to win in the final against either AEK or PAOK if qualified. The team consisted mainly of debutant players who were performing at their best such as Alexandros Kartalis, Christos Eleftheriadis, Nicolae Milinceanu etc.

=== 2021–2022 season and change of playing style ===
In the 2021–22 PAS Giannina finished 6th on the regular season and took part on play off round, finishing 6th, as well. This was one of the club's most successful campaigns mostly due to the defensive style of play used by the coach Iraklis Metaxas, using the containing 4-4-2 double six formation. An important part was played by goalkeeper Yuri Lodygin, regarded as the best goalkeeper to ever play for the Epirus side, and the defenders Peersman, Erramuspe, Kargas, Saliakas and Lodygin providing defensive security and stability, Erramuspe and Kargas displayed greater skill than usual, and Peersman and Saliakas being two of the most consistent players throughout the whole season helped the team. On the midfield, PAS Giannina signing from Super League 2 club Levadiakos, Zisis Karachalios completed one of the best seasons of his career, alongside Domínguez for the first half of the season, and Caleb Stanko for the second half. Karachalios provided great support in defence and steals, being ranked as the player with the most steals in Super League 1.

Juan José Perea performed well and scored 10 goals to help PAS Giannina on attack. A historic match between PAS Giannina Veterans and Ajax Veterans took part on Zosimades Stadium, on July 6, 2022.

=== Recent years (2022–present) ===
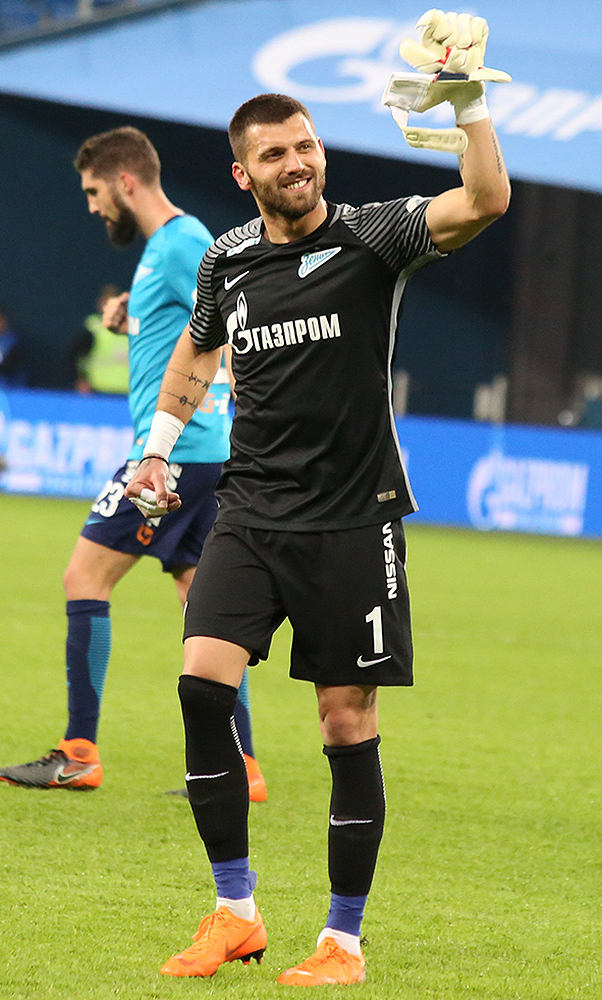
Yury Lodygin Best Goalkeeper in Super League in 2021–22

In the 2022–23 season, Thanasis Staikos took over, after a rather controversial decision from the club president, signing an inexperienced coach. PAS Giannina finished 11th on the regular season and took part on play out round. It finished on 9th after the end of play out. PAS started the 2023–24 in a very promising way, after beating A.E. Kifisia by 3–0 in the opening match, and an away draw against Panetolikos. However, lack of defensive stability, poor tactics and serious goalkeeper errors, PAS suffered shocking loses against Panseraikos, Volos, Lamia and A.E. Kifisia. Eventually, after a 13 games winless streak, Staikos resigned, becoming the first manager in 10 years to be replaced mid-season. After an awful season PAS Giannina finished on 14th and relegated to Super League Greece 2.

In 2024–25, PAS had a mediocre run in the championship. It finished 3rd but it never managed to challenge for promotion. The club also changed two managers and finished the season with a caretaker manager. The owners imposed a payment freeze, leading to financial difficulties for the club. The club also received 7 transfer bans from FIFA. There was also a threat of the club dropping to the local amateur divisions. Negotiations took place regarding the transfer of ownership, but they failed to result in a deal. Just before the club's collapse, Nikos Siontis, the son of the team's former captain, stepped in to save the club. PAS also sold over 2,000 season tickets, despite the fact that it was still unclear whether the team would participate in the league and without having a squad in place. Even former players bought season tickets to support the club. The club also competed in the Greek Cup 2025–26 with only 12 players, mostly young, with the youngest being just 15 years old. Although there was no hope of winning, over 3,000 fans showed up at the stadium to support the team. The club reached agreements to restructure its debts, the transfer bans were removed, and it secured a license for the upcoming league. In 2025–26, PAS had a disappointing season and finished 9th in the regular season of the championship. In the play-outs, PAS managed only three wins and finished 4th, resulting in relegation to the Gamma Ethniki. The club continued to face financial difficulties throughout the season.

== European competitions record ==
During the 2016–17 season, PAS Giannina competed on the UEFA Europa League qualifying rounds for the first time in the club's history. PAS Giannina finished 6th on the 2015–16 Super League Greece, which enabled him to participate, on the Second qualifying round.

=== PAS Giannina first european game ===
On 21s July 2016, PAS Giannina faced Odds BK in a full Zosimades Stadium with a total attendance of 5.615 spectators, who completed a pre game parade towards the stadium, with thousands of fans loudly signing chants. Players were greeted into the stadium by an unprecedented atmosphere which could be heard throughout the whole locality. PAS Giannina captain Alexios Michail opened the score from inside the box after a corner kick taken by Noé Acosta on the 7th minute. PAS Giannina had total control of the game, and in the 31st minute Fonsi Nadales doubled his team lead with a great volley after a perfectly executed cross by Nikos Karanikas. In the second half, the goalkeeper Alexandros Paschalakis with a presice volley across the whole length of the pitch, spotted Dimitrios Ferfelis who took advantage of the opposition's defenders error and sprinted towards goal with Acosta trailing. Ferfelis' shot got blocked by the goalkeeper, who couldn't handle the ball, and got served for Noé Acosta who scored to form the final score. On the 2nd leg, about 500 PAS Giannina fans traveled to Norway to support their team. The away side managed to concede no goals in the first half, but conceded 3 goals in the second half, and the game was led to extra time. However, the Epirus side managed to score after a remarkable dribble fooling the opposition defenders from Christopher Maboulou†, who let the ball pass beside him after a pass from Karanikas, to reach Leonardo Koutris who beat the goalkeeper, and formed the final score of 3–1 after extra time, and eventually led PAS Giannina to the Third qualifying round for the first time in the club's history.

Season	Competition	Round	Club	Home	Away	Aggregate
2016–17	UEFA Europa League	Second qualifying round	(Norway) Odds BK	3–0	3–1	4–3
2016–17	UEFA Europa League	Third qualifying round	(Netherlands) AZ Alkmaar	1–2	1–0	1–3

=== Balkans Cup ===
Season	Competition	Round	Club	Home	Away	Aggregate
1979–80	Balkans Cup	Group Stage	(Albania) Partizani	3–0	0–2	–
1979–80	Balkans Cup	Group Stage	(Socialist Federal Republic of Yugoslavia) NK Rijeka	1–3	1–2	–
1993–94	Balkans Cup	Semi-finals	(Albania) Besa	2–0	3–1	5–1
1993–94	Balkans Cup	Final	(Turkey) Samsunspor	0–2	0–3	0–5

== Stadium and facilities ==
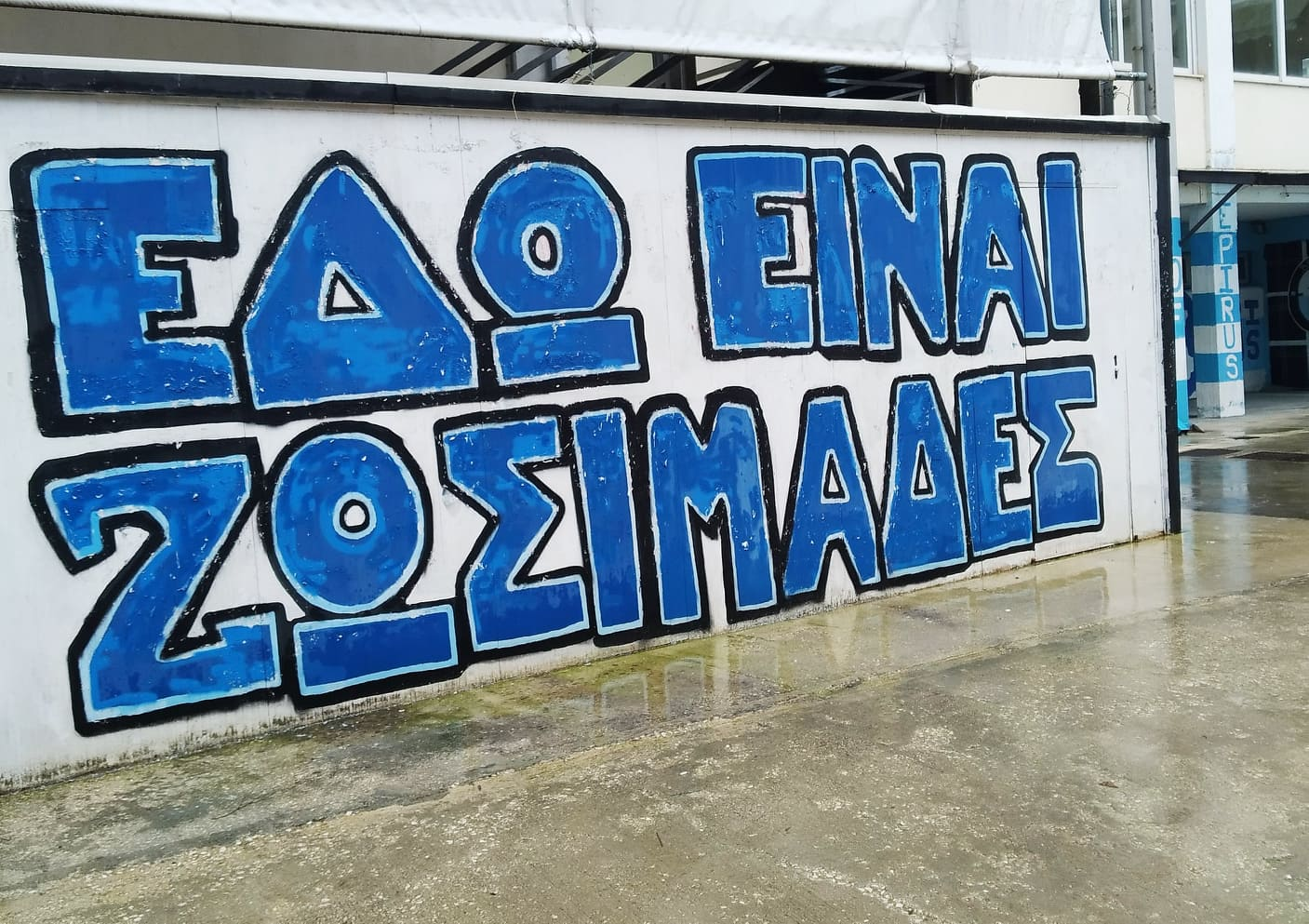
A graffiti outside of the stadium saying "Here is Zosimades" (Εδώ είναι Ζωσιμάδες)

PAS Giannina has played in the Zosimades stadium in downtown Ioannina since its founding. The stadium has a seating capacity of 7,500, but the highest ever attendance was 14,557 fans for a match with Olympiacos in the 1974-75 season.

Zosimades is a historic stadium and is known for its wide variety of graffiti depicting club legends and former squads. Training facilities are kept in the Panepirotan National Athletic Center.The property contains three football fields and a parking lot with a 500 vehicle capacity.

== Honours and distinctions ==
Over the years, PAS has competed in the Super League for a total of 28 seasons (plus 2023–24) The club has never won the Super League or the Greek Cup, but it has won lower division titles throughout its history and represented Greece in the 1979–80 and 1993–94 Balkans Cup tournaments. During its history in the Super League, the club finished 3 times in the 5th position (1975–76, 1977–78, 2012–13 seasons) and 4 times in the 6th position (1979–80, 2014–15, 2015–16, 2021–22 seasons).

On 31 January 2007, PAS clinched a spot in the Greek Cup semifinals by virtue of an extra-time goal from Evangelos Kontogoulidis before a hostile crowd in Karaiskakis Stadium. With an aggregate score of 3–2, PAS Giannina also is the first ever lower division club that eliminated Olympiacos from the Greek Cup tournament. The most famous player to have donned the blue and white PAS Giannina's jersey in recent years is defender Giourkas Seitaridis, who later played for Panathinaikos, FC Porto, Dynamo Moscow, and Atlético Madrid as well as the triumphant Euro 2004 Greece squad.

=== Domestic competitions ===
- Super League 2 (Second Division)
  - Champions (4): 1973–74, 1984–85, 2001–02, 2019–20
- Gamma Ethniki (Third Division)
  - Champions (1): 1997–98
- Greek Cup
  - Semi-Finals (3): 2006–07, 2009–10, 2020–21

=== International ===
- ''Balkans Cup
  - Runners-Up (1): 1993–94

=== Individual player and coach awards ===
- Best Manager in Greece
  - (Greece) Giannis Christopoulos: 2012–13
  - (Greece) Giannis Petrakis: 2014–15
- Best Young Player
  - (Greece) Charis Charisis: 2014–15
- Best Goalkeeper
  - (Greece) Markos Vellidis: 2014–15
  - (Russia) Yuri Lodygin: 2021–22
- Top Scorer of Greek Cup
  - (Greece) Georgios Pamlidis: 2019–20 (together with Dimitrios Pelkas)
  - (Spain) Pedro Conde: 2017–18 (together with Aleksandar Prijović, Lazaros Christodoulopoulos)
  - (Greece) Georgios Saitiotis: 2006–07 (together with Jozef Kožlej)
- Top Scorer of Beta Ethniki
  - (Ivory Coast) (France) Ibrahima Bakayoko: 2010–11
- Team of the Season
  - (Greece) Markos Vellidis: 2014–15
  - (Greece) Leonardo Koutris: 2016–17
  - (Russia) Yuri Lodygin: 2021–22
  - (Greece) Giannis Kargas: 2021–22
  - (Greece) Manolis Saliakas: 2021–22

== Supporters and nickname ==
The team is well known for its passionate supporters, mainly from the city of Ioannina and the whole Epirus region. The first union was the fan club of square at 70s and 80s. A new fan club was founded in 1986. The name was the bulls (tavroi). The club was active until 2011. One more fan club was founded in the middle of 90s unofficial, Blue Vayeros. Officially it was founded in 2000. Apei rotan was founded in 2008 and they were active until 2015. Azzurra Familia was founded in 2013 and it was active for a short period. PAS Giannina fan club was founded in 2018.

There were fan clubs in Athens like Los Toros Locos (2001–2009) or Thessaloniki (Blue Vayeros Salonica (2006–2011). There are also groups in Greece or abroad. PAS Giannina was given the nickname Ajax of Epirus (Greek: Άγιαξ της Ηπείρου) in the 1970s, thanks to their impressive football style which was linked licentia poetica to the style of the famous Dutch club.

== Rivalries ==
PAS Giannina fans feel deep antipathy towards the clubs from Athens: Olympiacos, Panathinaikos and AEK Athens. There is a rivalry with OFI based on the events surrounding their 2001 playoffs. In contrast, derby matches against AEL are competitive in the sporting sense but do not evoke the same feelings of enmity from PAS Giannina supporters. The other important rivals are Panachaiki, Panetolikos, AO Kerkyra. In the past there were local derbies in Epirus. These were with Anagennisi Arta and PAS Preveza. There was a rivalry with Panionios based on 1984 playout match. This rivalry has been increased since the summer of 2016, when Panionios was not granted a license by UEFA to compete in the Europa League following a claim by PAS Giannina. UEFA ruled that PAS Giannina take Panionios’ place in the 2016 2nd qualifying round of the Europa League.

== Crest and colours ==
The colours of the team are blue or cyan and white. The crest depicts an ancient bull with an oak wreath, as appeared in an ancient coin (238–168 BC) of the Epirote League plus the word "ΑΠΕΙΡΩΤΑΝ" meaning "people of Epirus".

1968–69	1973–74	1985–86	2015–16 (third)	2016–17	2017–18

=== Kit manufacturers and shirt sponsors ===
Season	Kit manufacturer	Shirt sponsor
1980–81	Asics Tiger	—
1981–82	Asics Tiger	turb jeans
1982–83	Asics Tiger	Hoval
1983–84	Le coq sportif	Nec Hi-Fi
1984–85	Asics Tiger	Freedom jeans/Macle jeans
1985–86	Puma	Propo
1986–87	Puma	Propo
1987–88	Adidas	—
1988–89	Puma	Propo
1989–90	—	—
1990–91	Adidas	Dunlop
1991–93	Adidas	Dodoni
1993–94	Nike	—
1994–95	Diadora	Propo
1995–96	Lotto	Propo/Filmnet
1996–97	Puma	—
1997–99	Umbro	—
1999–00	Umbro	Laiko Lacheio
2000–01	Puma	Pindos
2001–02	Umbro	—
2002–04	Joma	—
2004–05	Nike	Tzoker
2005–06	Adidas	Zagori
2006–08	Umbro	Zagori
2008–09	Puma	Zagori
2009–10	Umbro	Zagori
2010–11	Lotto	Zagori
2011–13	Lotto	Tzoker
2013–17	Nike	Tzoker
2017–19	Nike	Vikos Cola/car.gr
2019–20	Joma	car.gr
2020–21	Kappa	NetBet
2021–23	Le coq sportif	NetBet
2023–24	Puma	novibet
2024–25	Puma	-
2025–26	Adidas	Hall of Brands
2026–27	Athlos	Mitsis

== Players ==
=== Current squad ===
As of 19 November 2026

Note: Flags indicate national team as defined under FIFA eligibility rules; some limited exceptions apply. Players may hold more than one non-FIFA nationality.

No.	Pos.	Nation	Player
1	GK	GRE	Nikolaos Koliofoukas
2	DF	GRE	Vasilios Kitsakis
3	DF	GRE	Orestis Sintos
4	DF	GRE	Eleftherios Grestas
5	DF	GRE	Panagiotis Kafenzis
6	MF	GRE	Vasilis Tsiamis
7	MF	GRE	Stathis Belevonis
8	MF	GRE	Charalabos Panos
9	FW	GRE	Christos Gogos
10	MF	GRE	Evripidis Giakos (Captain)
11	MF	GRE	Savvas Siatravanis
12	DF	GRE	Giorgos Vergos
13	MF	GRE	Stefanos Barlis

No.	Pos.	Nation	Player
14	DF	GRE	Fotis Gogas
16	MF	GRE	Giannis Tsiatouras
17	DF	GRE	Konstantinos Zdravos (Vice captain)
18	MF	GRE	Konstantinos Katerinis
19	FW	GRE	Nikos Tzovaras
20	MF	GRE	Konstantinos Dekoumes
21	MF	GRE	Alexandros Ferentinos
22	DF	GRE	Ilias Lazaridis
24	MF	GRE	Thomas Potsis
25	FW	GRE	Panagiotis Ballas
30	GK	GRE	Ioannis Botsaris
—	GK	GRE	Theocharis Bantavelis

== Notable former players ==
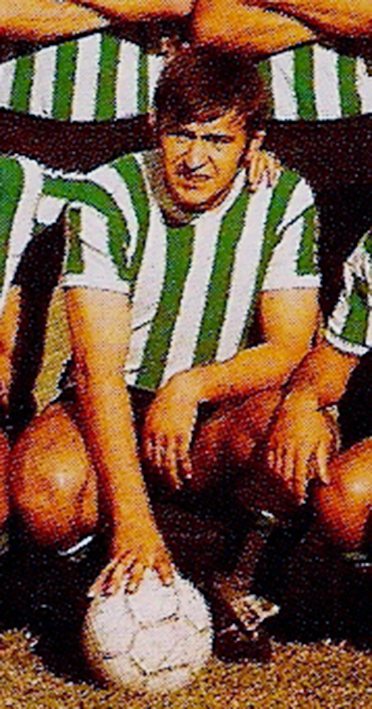
Óscar Álvarez

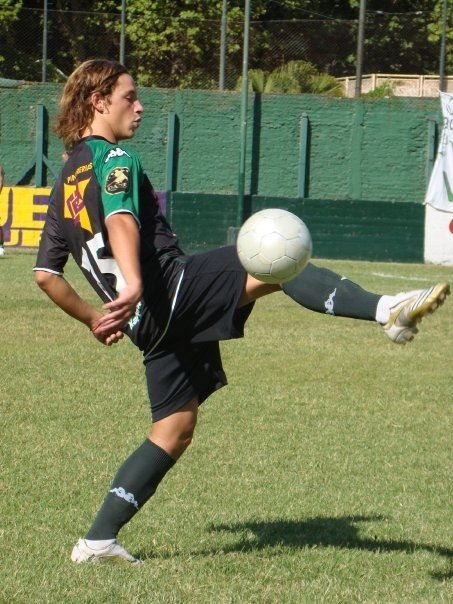
Tomás De Vincenti

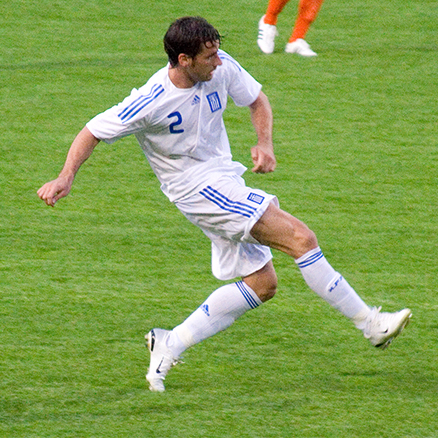
Giourkas Seitaridis

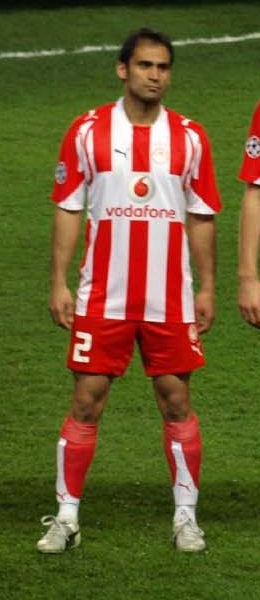
Christos Patsatzoglou

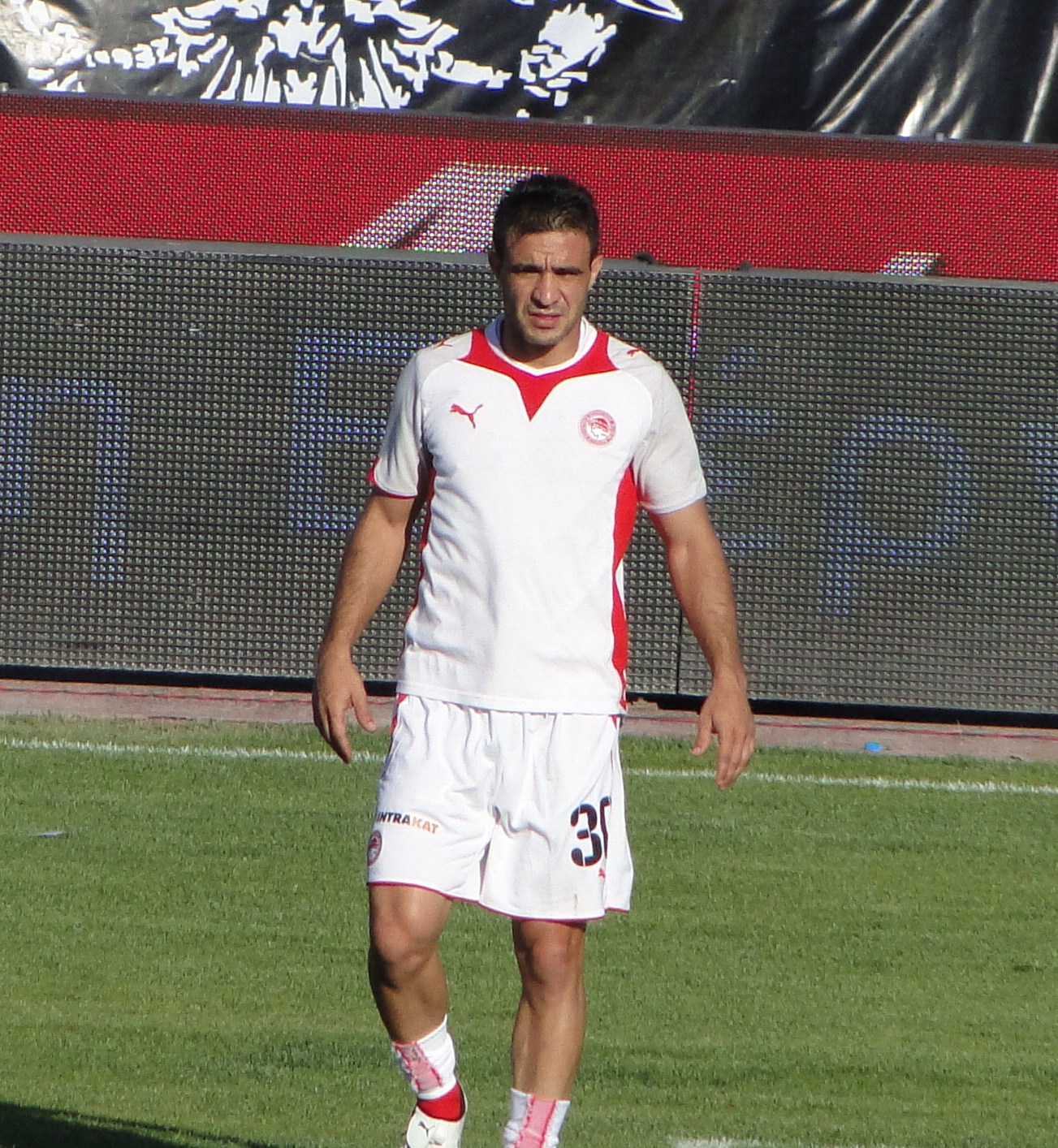
Anastasios Pantos

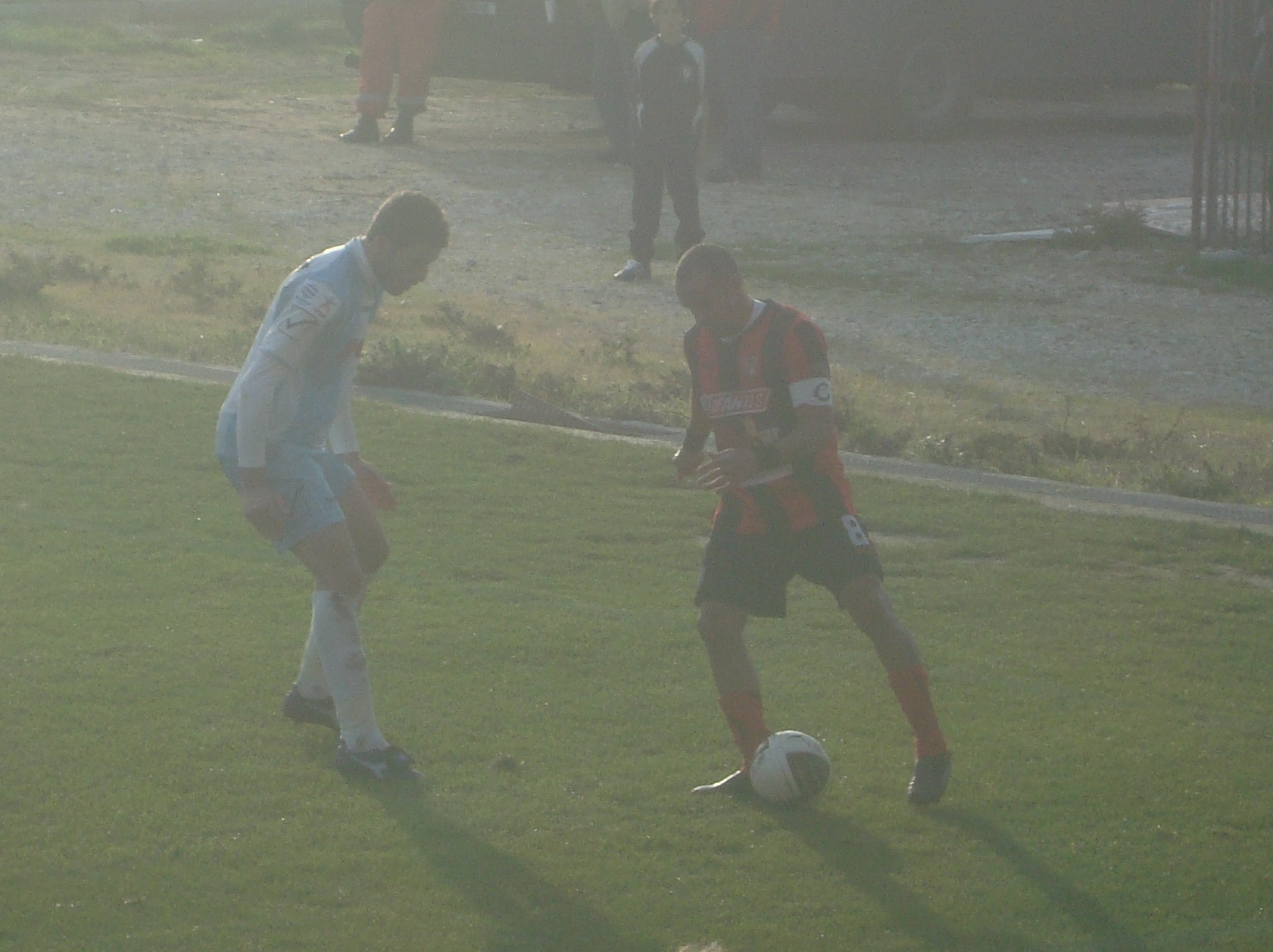
Luciano de Souza

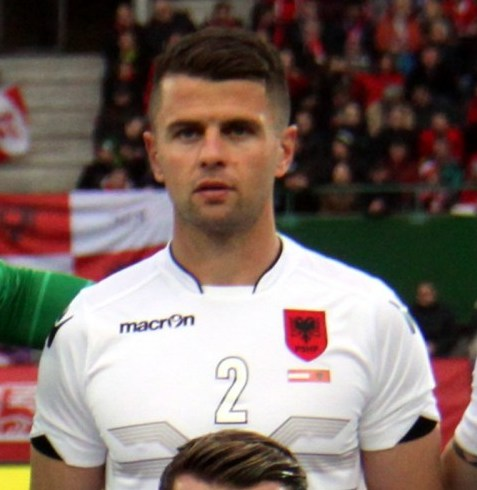
Andi Lila

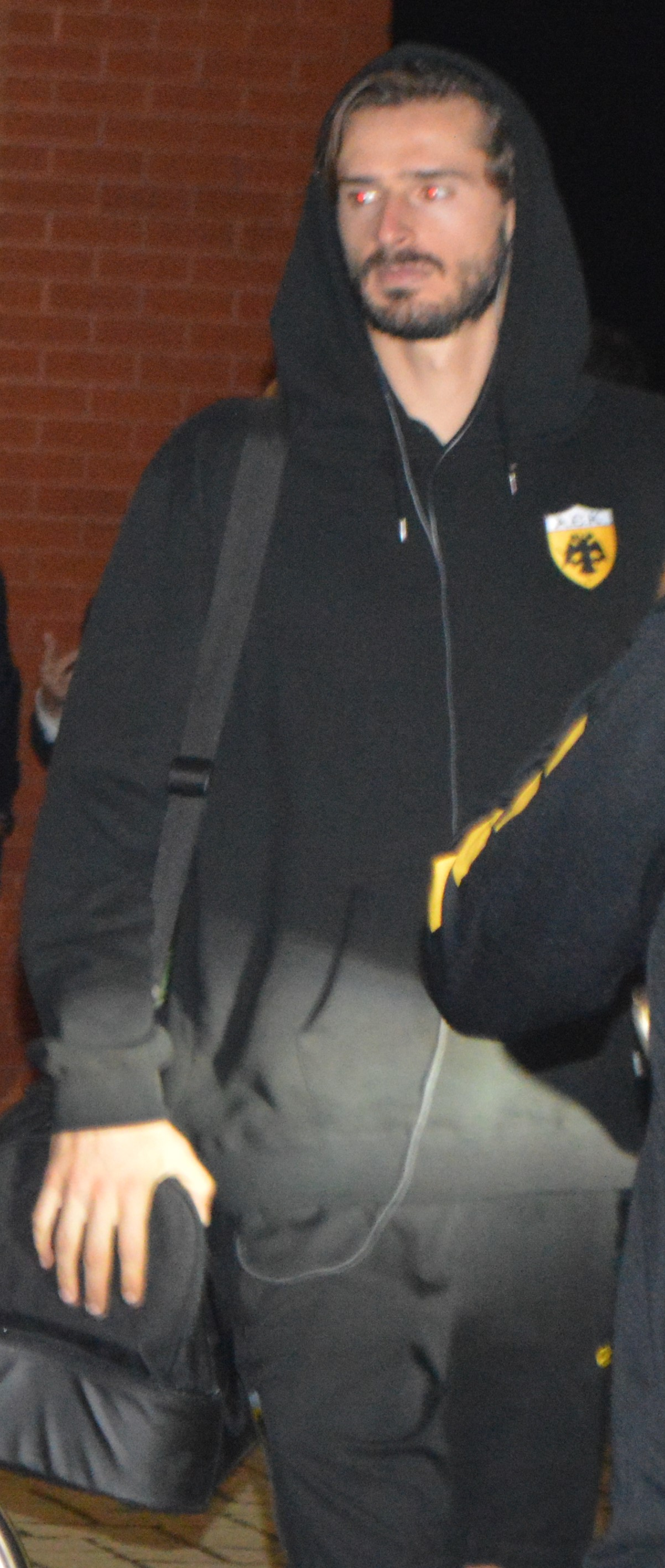
Marios Oikonomou

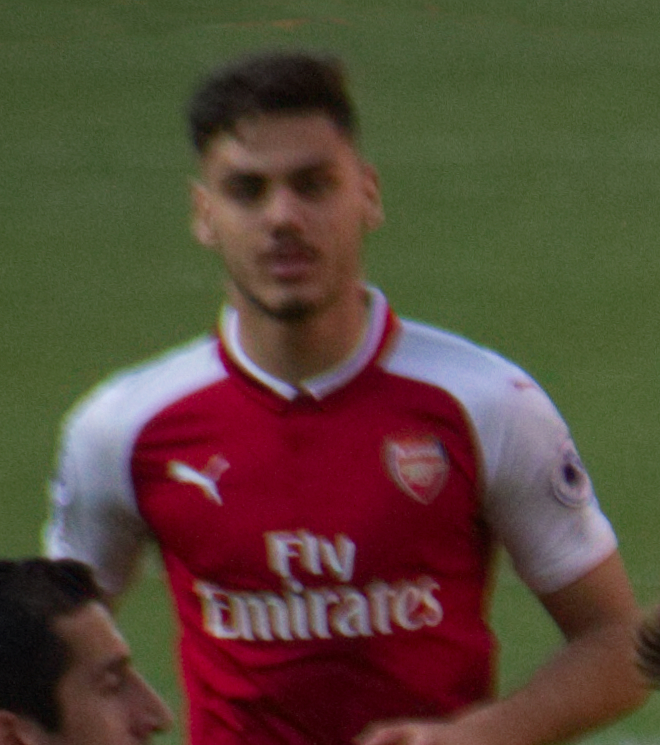
Konstantinos Mavropanos

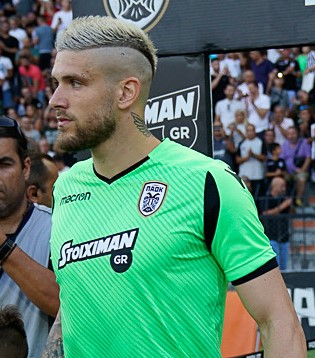
Alexandros Paschalakis

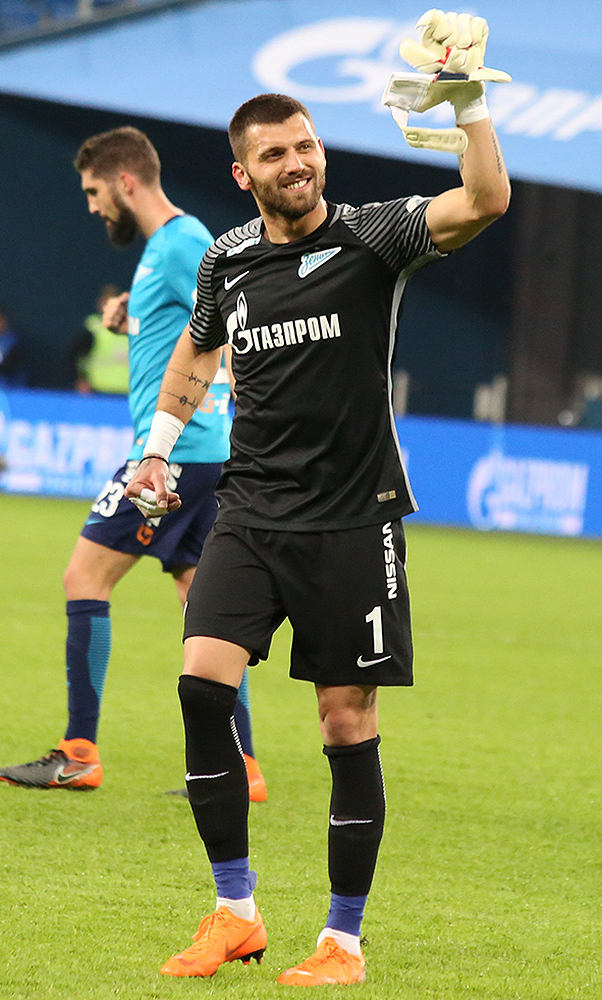
Yuri Lodygin

Albania

- (Albania) Arjan Bellaj
- (Albania) Andi Lila
- (Albania) (Greece) Foto Strakosha
- (Albania) Emiljano Vila
- (Albania) Arjan Xhumba

Algeria

- (Algeria) Riad Hammadou

Argentina

- (Argentina) (Greece) Óscar Álvarez +
- (Argentina) Leandro Becerra
- (Argentina) Esteban Buján
- (Argentina) Claudio Campos
- (Argentina) Cristian Chávez
- (Argentina) Tomas De Vincenti
- (Argentina) (Greece) Alfredo Glasman
- (Argentina) (Greece) Eduardos Kontogeorgakis
- (Argentina) (Greece) Eduardo Lisa
- (Argentina) (Greece) Juan Montes
- (Argentina) (Greece) Jose Pasternac
- (Argentina) Lucas Rimoldi

Belgium

- (Belgium) (Ghana) Marvin Peersman

Brazil

- (Brazil) (Greece) Luciano
- (Brazil) (Italy) Vanderson

Cameroon

- (Cameroon) Guy Armand Feutchine
- (Cameroon) Serge Honi

Colombia

- (Colombia) Fabry Castro
- (Colombia) Juan José Perea

France

- (France) (Republic of the Congo) Christopher Maboulou

Georgia

- (Georgia (country)) Levan Kebadze

Germany

- (Germany) (Greece) Alexandros Kartalis

Greece

- (Greece) Dionysis Alexakis
- (Greece) Andreas Bonovas
- (Greece) Thanasis Bretanos
- (Greece) Georgios Dasios
- (Greece) Theodoros Gitkos
- (Greece) Xenofon Gittas
- (Greece) Takis Grammeniatis
- (Greece) Giannis Kargas
- (Greece) Evangelos Kontogoulidis
- (Greece) Thomas Kyparissis
- (Greece) Nikos Lappas
- (Greece) Nikos Liakos
- (Greece) Konstantinos Mavropanos
- (Greece) Alexios Michail
- (Greece) Giorgos Oikonomou
- (Greece) Marios Oikonomou
- (Greece) Anastasios Pantos
- (Greece) Vasilis Papachristou
- (Greece) Vasilis Papagelis
- (Greece) Alekos Papageorgiou
- (Greece) Lakis Papaioannou
- (Greece) Alexandros Paschalakis
- (Greece) Christos Patsatzoglou
- (Greece) Giorgos Priskas
- (Greece) Manolis Saliakas
- (Greece) Georgios Saitiotis
- (Greece) Dimitris Seitaridis
- (Greece) Giourkas Seitaridis
- (Greece) Dimitris Sialmas
- (Greece) Giannis Tatsis
- (Greece) Stavros Tsoukalas
- (Greece) Thomas Tsourlidas

Guatemala

- (Guatemala) Guillermo Ramírez
- (Guatemala) Carlos Ruiz

Guinea

- (Guinea) Jean Marie Sylla
- (Guinea) Ahmad Mendes Moreira

Ivory Coast

- (Ivory Coast) (France) Ibrahima Bakayoko

North Macedonia

- (North Macedonia) Sandro Manevski

Morocco

- (Morocco) Karim Fegrouche

Netherlands

- (Netherlands) Dennis van Wijk

New Zealand

- (New Zealand) (Greece) Themistoklis Tzimopoulos

Russia

- (Russia) (Greece) Yuri Lodygin

Serbia

- (Serbia) Brana Ilić
- (Serbia) (Greece) Vladan Milojević
- (Serbia) Zdenko Muf
- (Serbia) Dragojlo Radojičić

Slovenia

- (Slovenia) Andraž Struna

Spain

- (Spain) Noé Acosta
- (Spain) Juan Domínguez
- (Spain) David López Nadales

== Records and statistics ==
=== Most appearances and top scorers ===
Most appearances:

Rank	Name	Apps
1	(Argentina) (Greece) Eduardos Kontogeorgakis	317
2	(Argentina) (Greece) Alfredo Glasman	314
3	(Greece) Alexios Michail	306
4	(Greece) Georgios Dasios	281
5	(Albania) Arjan Bellaj	264

Top scorers:

Rank	Name	Goals
1	(Argentina) (Greece) Eduardos Kontogeorgakis	91
2	(Argentina) (Greece) Óscar Álvarez +	77
3	(Argentina) (Greece) Alfredo Glasman	75
4	(Greece) Giorgos Saitiotis	61
5	(Albania) Arjan Bellaj	51

== Managerial history ==
- (Greece) Kostas Choumis (1966)
- (Greece) Konstantinos Kokkas (1966) Care taker
- (Greece) Adam Pitsioudis (1966–67)
- (Greece) Christoforidis (1967–68)
- (Greece) Chrisochoou (1968–69)
- (Greece) Karalazos (1969–)
- (Greece) Panagiotis Deligiorgis (–70)
- (Greece) Adam Pitsioudis (1970–)
- (Greece) Giannis Papantoniou (–71)
- (Portugal) Gómez de Faria (1971–73)
- (Greece) Nikos Alefantos (1973–74)
- (Argentina) Eduardo Rigani (1974)
- (Greece) Antonis Georgiadis (1974–76)
- (Bulgaria) Dobromir Zhechev (1976–77)
- (Greece) Antonis Georgiadis (1977–79)
- (Greece) Nikos Alefantos (1979)
- (Greece) Paulos Tzamakos (1979)
- (Greece) Giorgos Siontis (1979)
- (Poland) Jacek Gmoch (December, 1979 – June 30, 1981)
- (Greece) Giorgos Siontis (1981–1982)
- (Bulgaria) Petar Argirov (1982–1983)
- (Greece) Andreas Karamanolakis (1983–84)
- (Germany) Gerhard Prokop (1984)
- (Greece) Giorgos Siontis (1984)
- (Greece) Christos Archontidis (July 1, 1984 – June 30, 1985)
- (Germany) Gerhard Prokop (July 1, 1985 – Dec 29, 1986)
- (Greece) Takis Geitonas (Dec 30, 1986 – Jan 7,1987) Care taker
- (Netherlands) Ab Fafié (Jan 7, 1987 – June 30, 1987)
- (Greece) Kostas Karapatis (Aug 11, - Nov 24, 1987)
- (Greece) Thomas Tsourlidas (Nov 24, 1987 – Dec 27, 1987)
- (Greece) Stefanos Vasileiadis (Dec 27, 1987 – 88)
- (Greece) Giorgos Siontis (1988)
- (Greece) Thanasis Loukanidis-Takis Loukanidis (1988–89)
- (Argentina) (Greece) Alfredo Glasmanis-Paulos Tzamakos (1989)
- (Greece) Stavros Diamantopoulos (July 1, 1989 – April 23, 1990)
- (Greece) Thanasis Dimitriadis (April 24, 1990 – June 8, 1990)
- (Poland) Włodzimierz Lubański (June 9, 1990 – July 6, 1990)
- (Belgium) (Hungary) Tom Frivalski (July 6, 1990 – Sep 6, 1990)
- (Greece) Stefanos Vasileiadis (Sep 6, 1990 – Sep 14, 1990) Care taker
- (Czech Republic) Petr Packert (Sep 14, 1990 – June 2, 1991)
- (Netherlands) Barry Hulshoff (July 1, 1991 – Dec 5, 1991)
- (Greece) Stefanos Vasileiadis (Dec 5, 1991 – Dec 13, 1991) Care taker
- (Greece) Giorgos Siontis (Dec 13, 1991 – Jan 20, 1992)
- (Greece) Thanasis Dimitriadis (Jan 24, 1992 – June 30, 1992)
- (Greece) Anthimos Kapsis (July 1, 1992 – Jan 24, 1993)
- (Greece) Lazaros Giotis (Jan 25, 1993 – June 30, 1993)
- (Serbia) Dragan Kokotović (July 1, 1993 – February 19, 1994)
- (Greece) Nikos Kirgios (Feb 19, 1994 – Feb 25, 1994) Care taker
- (Greece) Makis Katsavakis (February 25, 1994 – April 11, 1994)
- (Greece) Vasilis Konstantinou (April 13, 1994 – June 30, 1994)
- (Bulgaria) Dobromir Zhechev (July 1, 1994 – August 1, 1994)
- (Greece) Takis Grammeniatis (Aug 1, 1994 – Jan 7, 1995)
- (Greece) Dimitris Seitaridis (Aug 1, 1994 – Sep 14, 1994) with Grammeniatis
- (Greece) Vasilis Papachristou (Jan 10, 1995 – June 30, 1995)
- (Germany) Timo Zahnleiter (July 1, 1995 – January 10, 1996)
- (Greece) Dimitris Seitaridis (Jan 10, 1996 – Sep 27, 1996)
- (Greece) Thanasis Dimitriadis (Sep 27, 1996 – Mar 12, 1997)
- (Greece) Vasilis Papachristou (Mar 12, 1997 – June 30, 1998)
- (Greece) Makis Katsavakis (July 1, 1998 – October 29, 1998)
- (Greece) Nikos Kirgios (Oct 29, 1998 – Nov 3, 1998) Care taker
- (Greece) Nikos Anastopoulos (Nov 3, 1998 – May 3, 1999)
- (Greece) Vasilis Papachristou (May 3, 1999 – June 30, 1999)
- (Greece) Andreas Michalopoulos (July 1, 1999 – Feb 15, 2000)
- (Greece) Giorgos Foiros (February 15, 2000 – June 30, 2000)
- (Greece) Georgios Paraschos (July 1, 2000 – Jan 11, 2001)
- (Greece) Andreas Bonovas (Jan 11, 2001 – Jan 13, 2001) Care taker
- (Greece) Nikos Kovis (Jan 13, 2001 – Jan 29, 2001)
- (Greece) Nikos Anastopoulos (Jan 29, 2001 – June 30, 2001)
- (Greece) Stavros Mentis (July 1, 2001 – Aug 20, 2001)
- (Argentina) Horacio Cordero (Aug 20, 2001 – Sep 23, 2001)
- (Greece) Giorgos Foiros (September 24, 2001 – May 22, 2002)
- (Greece) Giorgos Vazakas (June 1, 2002 – June 7, 2002)
- (Greece) Vasilis Papachristou (July 1, 2002 – Nov 5, 2002)
- (Greece) Nikos Anastopoulos (Nov 8, 2002 – June 30, 2003)
- (Greece) Pantelis Kolokas (July 1, 2003 – Aug 7, 2003) Care taker
- (Sweden) Bo Petersson (Aug 7, 2003 – Jan 12, 2004)
- (Greece) Sotiris Zavogiannis (Jan 12, 2004 – Jan 15, 2004) Care taker
- (Georgia (country)) Jemal Gugushvili (Jan 15, 2004 – April 1, 2004)
- (Georgia (country)) Goderdzi Natroshvili (Feb 11, 2004 – April 1, 2004)
- (Greece) Pantelis Kolokas (April 1, 2004 – April 18, 2004) Care taker
- (Greece) Thanasis Charisis (April 22, 2004 – June 30, 2004)
- (North Macedonia) Zoran Smileski (July 1, 2004 – Feb 21, 2005)
- (Greece) Giorgos Ladias (Feb 21, 2005 – Feb 23, 2005) Care taker
- (Greece) Petros Michos (Feb,23 2005 – April 10, 2005)
- (Greece) Giorgos Ladias (April 10, 2005 – June 30, 2005)
- (Greece) Vasilis Xanthopoulos (July 1, 2005 – Oct 26, 2005)
- (Greece) Giorgos Ladias (Oct 26, 2005 – Jan 11, 2006)
- (Greece) Ioannis Gounaris (Jan 12, 2006 – Aug 3, 2006)
- (Greece) Nikos Anastopoulos (Aug 5, 2006 – Jan 15, 2007)
- (Greece) Giannis Papakostas (Jan 15, 2007 – June 30, 2007)
- (Greece) Georgios Chatzaras (July 1, 2007 – March 2, 2008)
- (Greece) Periklis Amanatidis (March 3, 2008 – May 28, 2008)
- (Greece) Thanasis Charisis (May 28, 2008 – 30 June 2008) Care Taker
- (Greece) Nikos Anastopoulos (June 23, 2008 – June 30, 2008)
- (Argentina) Guillermo Ángel Hoyos (July 1, 2008 – April 29, 2009)
- (Greece) Miltos Mastoras (April 29, 2009 – May 25, 2009) Care Taker
- (Greece) Georgios Paraschos (July 1, 2009 – Dec 7, 2009)
- (Greece) Thimios Georgoulis (Dec 7, 2009 – Jan 13, 2010) Care taker
- (Greece) Nikos Anastopoulos (Jan 14, 2010 – June 30, 2010)
- (Belgium) Stéphane Demol (July 1, 2010 – Nov 23, 2011)
- (Greece) Giannis Christopoulos (Nov 23, 2011 – Dec 4, 2011) Care taker
- (Greece) Angelos Anastasiadis (Dec 4, 2011 – June 8, 2012)
- (Greece) Giannis Christopoulos (June 8, 2012 – June 16, 2013)
- (Greece) Savvas Pantelidis (June 24, 2013 – Oct 31, 2013)
- (Greece) Giorgos Georgoulopoulos (Oct 31, 2013 – Nov 5, 2013) Care taker
- (Greece) Sakis Tsiolis (Nov 5, 2013 – Jan 22, 2014)
- (Greece) Giorgos Georgoulopoulos (Jan 22, 2014 – Jan 28, 2014) Care taker
- (Greece) Giannis Petrakis (Jan 28, 2014 – May 8, 2019)
- (Greece) Argirios Giannikis (Jun 8, 2019 – May 19, 2021)
- (Greece) Iraklis Metaxas (Jun 3, 2021 – Jun 7, 2022)
- (Greece) Athanasios Staikos (Jun 7, 2022 – Dec 18, 2023)
- (Greece) Michalis Grigoriou (Dec 18, 2023 – Apr 22, 2024)
- (Greece) Giorgos Georgoulopoulos (Apr 22, 2024 – May 11, 2024) Care taker
- (Austria) René Poms (Jul 15, 2024 – Oct 21, 2024)
- (Greece) Vagelis Tziarras (Oct 21, 2024 – Oct 27, 2024) Care taker
- (Paraguay) Ariel Galeano (Oct 23, 2024 – Feb 6, 2025)
- (Greece) Nikos Badimas (Feb 6, 2025 – May 3, 2025)
- (Greece) Alexandros Tatsis (Aug 11, 2025 – Aug 20, 2025) Care taker
- (Greece) Nikos Koustas (Aug 21, 2025 – Nov 16, 2025)
- (Greece) Giannis Goumas (Nov 17, 2025 – Apr 27, 2026)
- (Greece) Christos Raptis (Jun 12, 2026 – present)

== Club personnel ==
=== Management ===
The administration of the club is entrusted to the governing committee of the amateur club. The committee is chaired by Charis Lazanis.The other members of the committee are Dimitris Petalis, Thanasis Charisis, Pavlos Miaris, and Manos Papadopoulos.The president of the amateur club is Napoleon Tsakanelis, who has held the position since 28 May 2026.

=== Football Department ===
Position	Staff
Team manager	Giorgos Dasios

=== Coaching staff ===
Position	Staff
Head coach	Christos Raptis
Assistant Coach	Spyros Kalogirou
Fitness coach	Dimitris Charisis
Goalkeeper coach	Nikos Spiridis
Analyst	Spyros Kalogirou

=== Medical staff ===
Position	Staff
Head doctor	Stavros Restanis

== Presidential history ==
PAS Giannina F.C. presidential history from 1966 to present
Periklis Giannis (1966–1970); Themistoklis Lekkas (1970); Achilleas Emmanouilidis (1970–1971); Athanasios Tsoukanelis (1971–1973); Konstantinos Mpegas (1973–1974); Eleftherios Kalogiannis (1974–1975); Christoforos Papadopoulos (1975–1977); Georgios Konstantopoulos (1977–1979); Kostas Anastasiou (1979–1981); Grigoris Gourgoulis (1981–1983); Nikos Anastasiou (1983–1984)	Vaggelis Gourgoulis (1984); Konstantinos Glinavos (1984–1985); Christos Mitsis (1985–1987); Konstantinos Glinavos (1987–1989); Konstantinos Christidis (1989–1997); Christoforos Papadopoulos (1997–1998); Manthos Kolempas (1998–2003); Nikos Gontas (2003); Manthos Kolempas (2003); Sotiris Pappas (2003–2004)	Pyrros Giannakos (2004); Alexis Kougias (2004–2006); Pyrros Giannakos (2006); Anastasios Ntouskos (2006); Eleftherios Glinavos (2006–2007); Konstantinos Prokos (2007); Babis Christoglou (2007–2008); Giorgos Christovasilis (2008–2023); Panagiotis Christovasilis (2023–2026); Charis Lazanis (2026–)

== Sponsorships ==
- Great Shirt Sponsor:
- Official Sport Clothing Manufacturer: Athlos
- Golden Sponsor: -

== See also ==
- PAS Giannina (sports club)
- History of PAS Giannina F.C.
- List of PAS Giannina F.C. seasons
- List of PAS Giannina F.C. records and statistics
- List of PAS Giannina F.C. managers
