= Eduardos Kontogeorgakis =

Greek footballer

Personal information
- Date of birth: 20 December 1949 (age 76)
- Place of birth: Argentina
- Position: Midfielder

Senior career*
Years	Team	Apps	(Gls)
1971–1972	Atlanta		
1972–1983	PAS Giannina	310	(90)
1983–1984	Kerkyra		
1984–1985	PAS Giannina	7	(2)

International career
1978	Greece	3	(0)
- * Club domestic league appearances and goals

Eduardos Kontogeorgakis (born 20 December 1949) is a former professional footballer who played as a midfielder. Born in Argentina, he represented Greece at international level.

== Career ==
Kontogeorgakis played club football in Argentina and Greece for Atlanta, PAS Giannina and Kerkyra. He was one of a number of Argentine players to play for PAS Giannina in the early 1970s.

He earned three caps for Greece in 1978.

== Personal life ==
His father is Eduardo Ricagni. Kontogeorgakis was born as Eduardo Ricagni like his father. When he moved in Greece in 1973, he used his maternal grandfather's surname. His grandfather was a refugee from Asia Minor who settled in Chios and then immigrated to Argentina, while his maternal grandmother was Spanish.
