= Andreas Bonovas =

Greek footballer (born 1963)

Personal information
- Full name: Andreas Bonovas
- Date of birth: 13 November 1963 (age 62)
- Place of birth: Asfaka, Ioannina, Greece
- Position: Midfielder

Senior career*
| Years | Team | Apps | (Gls) |
| 1982–1986 | PAS Giannina | 63 | (5) |
| 1986–1988 | Olympiacos | 38 | (4) |
| 1988–1992 | Iraklis | 73 | (1) |
| 1992–1994 | PAS Giannina | | |
| 1994–1997 | Panargiakos | | |
| 1997–1998 | Marko | | |

International career
| 1986–1989 | Greece | 20 | (1) |

Managerial career
- 2001: PAS Giannina
- * Club domestic league appearances and goals

Andreas Bonovas (Greek: Ανδρέας Μπονόβας; born 13 November 1963) is a Greek former footballer who played as a midfielder and made 20 appearances for the Greece national team.

== Career ==
Bonovas made his debut for Greece on 26 March 1986 in a friendly match against East Germany, which finished as a 2–0 win. He went on to make 20 appearances, scoring 1 goal, before making his last appearance on 23 August 1989 in the 0–0 friendly draw against Norway.

== Career statistics ==
=== International ===
Greece
| Year | Apps | Goals |
|---|---|---|
| 1986 | 2 | 0 |
| 1987 | 7 | 1 |
| 1988 | 7 | 0 |
| 1989 | 4 | 0 |
| Total | 20 | 1 |

=== International goals ===
| No. | Date | Venue | Opponent | Score | Result | Competition |
|---|---|---|---|---|---|---|
| 1 | 14 January 1987 | Olympic Stadium, Athens, Greece | Cyprus | 2–1 | 3–1 | UEFA Euro 1988 qualifying |
