= Juan Montes =

Argentine footballer (born 1947)

Personal information
- Full name: Juan Enrique Montes
- Date of birth: 4 June 1947 (age 79)
- Place of birth: Buenos Aires, Argentina
- Position: Midfielder

Senior career*
Years	Team	Apps	(Gls)
–1969	Atlanta		
1969–1972	Chacarita Juniors		
1972–1982	PAS Giannina		
- * Club domestic league appearances and goals

Juan Montes (born 4 June 1947) is a retired footballer who played as a midfielder for clubs in Argentina and Greece.

== Club career ==
Born in Buenos Aires, Montes began playing football for Club Atlético Atlanta. In 1969, he moved to local rivals Club Atlético Chacarita Juniors, where he would win the 1969 Metropolitano championship.

In July 1972, Montes joined Greek second division side PAS Giannina F.C. He spent more than ten seasons with PAS Giannina, helping the club gain promotion to the Greek first division during the 1973–74 season. He left the club in December 1982, making 231 appearances and scoring 4 goals in the Greek top flight.

== Honours ==
PAS Giannina

- Super League Greece 2: 1973-74
