= Vasilios Papachristou =

Greek footballer and manager

Personal information
- Date of birth: 8 January 1959 (age 67)
- Place of birth: Lithino, Zitsa, Ioannina, Greece
- Height: 1.72 m (5 ft 8 in)
- Position: Midfielder

Senior career*
Years	Team	Apps	(Gls)
–1976	Atromitos Ioannina		
1976–1985	PAS Giannina		
1985–1988	Olympiacos		
1988–1990	Ethnikos Piraeus		
1989–1991	PAS Giannina		

Managerial career
- 1995: PAS Giannina
- 1997–1998: PAS Giannina
- 1998: Ethnikos Piraeus
- 1999: PAS Giannina
- 1999: Anagennisi Karditsa
- 2000: Leonidio
- 2001: Paniliakos
- 2001–2002: Patraikos
- 2002: PAS Giannina
- 2004: Paniliakos
- 2004: Levadiakos
- 2005: Panachaiki
- 2006: Olympiacos Volos
- 2008: Kalamata
- 2008: Pierikos
- 2008: Kalamata
- 2008: Veria
- 2009: Ilisiakos
- 2011: Anagennisi Karditsa
- * Club domestic league appearances and goals

Vasilios Papachristou (Greek: Βασίλειος Παπαχρήστου; born 8 January 1959) is a Greek former football player who played as a midfielder and a former manager.
