= Giannis Papakostas =

Greek football manager (born 1968)

Personal information
- Date of birth: 10 December 1968 (age 57)
- Place of birth: Sydney, Australia

Senior career*
Years	Team	Apps	(Gls)
- Chaidari F.C.

Managerial career
- 2002–2006: Chaidari
- 2006: Asteras Tripolis
- 2007: PAS Giannina
- 2007–2008: Panserraikos
- 2009: Kavala
- 2009–2010: AEL
- 2011: Levadiakos
- 2012: Panachaiki
- 2012: Kallithea
- 2013: Kerkyra
- * Club domestic league appearances and goals

Giannis Papakostas (Greek: Γιάννης Παπακώστας) is a Greek football manager. Papakostas began his coaching career at Eleusina and Chalkidona and PAS Giannina that he brought into the semi-final of Greek Cup in the 2006–07 season. Papakostas later managed Panserraikos and Kavala.
