= Stavros Diamantopoulos =

Greek football player and manager

Personal information
- Date of birth: 4 August 1947 (age 79)
- Place of birth: Lekani, Kavala, Greece
- Position: Midfielder

Senior career*
Years	Team	Apps	(Gls)
1964–1977	Pierikos		

Managerial career
- 1985: Pierikos
- 1988–1989: PAS Giannina
- 1993–1994: Levadiakos
- 1994–1995: Edessaikos
- 1995–1996: Olympiacos
- 1996–1997: Aris
- 1997–1998: Panachaiki
- 1999: AEL
- 2000: Naoussa
- 2001–2002: Olympiacos Volos
- 2005–2006: Kozani
- 2005–2006: Olympiacos Volos
- 2006–2007: Niki Volos
- 2007–2008: Olympiacos Volos
- 2009–2010: Kastoria
- 2017–2018: Pierikos
- 2022: Apollon Larissa (caretaker)
- * Club domestic league appearances and goals

Stavros Diamantopoulos (Greek: Σταύρος Διαμαντόπουλος, born 4 August 1947) is a Greek football player and manager.

He played for Pierikos.

As a manager he sat at the bench of Pierikos, PAS Giannina, Levadiakos, Edessaikos, Olympiacos, Aris, Panachaiki, AEL, Naoussa, Olympiacos Volos, Kozani, Niki Volos and Kastoria.
