= Leonardo Koutris =

Greek association footballer (born 1995)

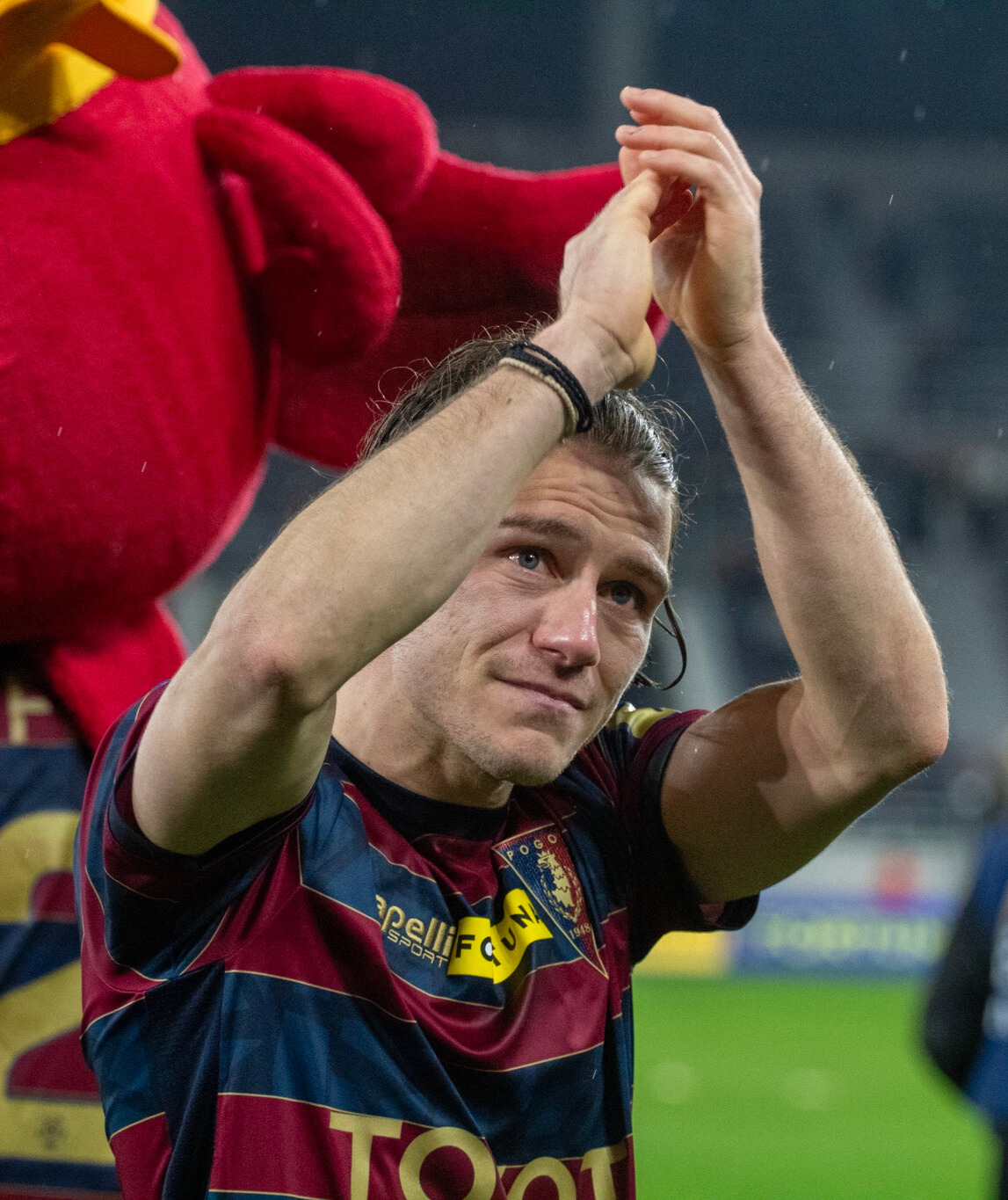
- Koutris in 2024 with Pogoń Szczecin

Personal information
- Full name: Leonardo Pablo Koutris
- Date of birth: 23 July 1995 (age 31)
- Place of birth: Ribeirão Preto, Brazil
- Height: 1.75 m (5 ft 9 in)
- Position: Left-back

Team information
- Current team: Celje
- Number: 33

Youth career
- 2002–2011: Niki Rodou
- 2011–2013: Ergotelis

Senior career*
Years	Team	Apps	(Gls)
2013–2016	Ergotelis	31	(0)
2016–2017	PAS Giannina	29	(0)
2017–2022	Olympiacos	45	(1)
2020	→ Mallorca (loan)	2	(0)
2020–2022	→ Fortuna Düsseldorf (loan)	27	(0)
2023–2026	Pogoń Szczecin	116	(3)
2026–	Celje	0	(0)

International career
2013	Greece U18	1	(0)
2013–2014	Greece U19	3	(0)
2015	Greece U21	2	(0)
2018–2021	Greece	7	(0)
- * Club domestic league appearances and goals as of 09:56, 30 May 2026 (UTC)

Leonardo Pablo Koutris (Greek: Λεονάρντο Κούτρης; born 23 July 1995) is a professional footballer who plays as a left-back for Slovenian PrvaLiga club Celje. Born in Brazil, he represented Greece at international level.

== Club career ==
=== Ergotelis ===
Born in Ribeirão Preto, Brazil, Koutris moved to Greece at the age of 6. He started his career with an amateur team, Niki Rodos, where he was spotted by Super League club Ergotelis scouts in 2011. On 28 January 2013, he signed his first professional contract with the club and made his debut as a substitute in a match against Greek champions Olympiacos on 1 December 2013. Already an international with the Greek U19 and U21 squads, and considered one of the greatest talents at Ergotelis, he renewed his contract with the club on 5 June 2014.

After Ergotelis' relegation to the Football League in the summer of 2015, and despite reported interest from Greek club Panathinaikos, Koutris was one of the 17 players to hold out as part of the club's roster until the very end, which came in January 2016, when Ergotelis officially withdrew from professional competitions, and released all players from their contracts.

=== PAS Giannina ===
As a free agent, Koutris signed a three-year contract with Greek Super League club PAS Giannina on 26 January 2016. He scored his first goal for the club on 21 July 2016, during his European debut, netting an extra time away goal against Norwegian club Odd during the third qualifying round of the 2016–17 UEFA Europa League. This goal helped his club advance to the next round for the first time in its history, after winning the two-legged tie 4–3 on aggregate.

On 28 April 2017, he signed a contract with champions Olympiacos for an estimated fee of €600,000.

=== Olympiacos ===
On 25 July 2017, Koutris made his debut with the club in a 3–1 away win UEFA game against Partizan. He played all the international games of the club, helping Olympiacos to reach UEFA Champions League group stage, after a year. On 9 September 2017, he made his debut with the club in the Super League in a 1–1 away draw against Xanthi. In the same month, it was reported that Eintracht Frankfurt and Benfica were tracking Koutris whom Olympiacos were eager to offer a new contract. On 18 November 2017, he scored his first goal with the club, sealing a 2–1 home Super League game against Levadiakos. He was voted MVP of the game.

In November 2018, West Ham United sporting director Mario Husillos reportedly spent the international break watching Koutris with the club considering a move for him. In January 2019, Olympiacos rejected an official bid of Italian club Genoa for Koutris in the range of €5 million.

==== Loan to Mallorca ====
On 29 January 2020, Koutris was sent on loan to La Liga club Mallorca. On 15 February 2020, he made his debut the club as a substitute in the first half, replacing Lumor Agbenyenu in a 1–0 win home game against Deportivo Alavés. On 21 February 2020, it was announced he would miss six months after suffering an anterior cruciate ligament injury in a league match against Real Betis.

==== Loan to Fortuna Düsseldorf ====
On 2 October 2020, the 2. Bundesliga club announced the acquisition of the 25-year-old left back in the form of a loan until 2022, with a purchase option at the range of €3 million.

=== Pogoń Szczecin ===
On 4 December 2022, it was announced he would leave Olympiacos permanently after five-and-a-half years to join Polish side Pogoń Szczecin on a three-and-a-half contract.

=== Celje ===
On 1 July 2026, after his contract with Pogoń had expired, Koutris signed a two-year deal with Slovenian PrvaLiga club Celje.

== International career ==
On 9 November 2018, Greece's new coach Angelos Anastasiadis called up Koutris for the UEFA Nations League matches against Finland and Estonia. On 15 November 2018, he made his debut in a 1–0 home win against Estonia.

== Personal life ==
Koutris holds both Greek as well as Brazilian citizenship, being born to a Greek father and a Brazilian mother.

=== Stretcher bearer incident ===
On 17 October 2015, during a Football League match against AEL at the AEL FC Arena, Koutris was involuntarily involved in a comical incident after having gone down injured by a challenge just outside the penalty area. Unable to stand up, he was roughly loaded onto a stretcher by two stretcher bearers, who proceeded to drop him twice while carrying him outside, before unceremoniously dumping him at the side of the pitch. Ergotelis issued a formal complaint a few hours after the match had ended. The incident video went viral worldwide, and received coverage from major networks, such as BBC and the Telegraph, as well as being shown on The Ellen DeGeneres Show.

== Career statistics ==
=== Club ===
As of match played 23 May 2026

Appearances and goals by club, season and competition
Club	Season	League			National cup (Note: Includes Greek Cup, DFB-Pokal, Polish Cup)		Continental		Total	
Club	Season	Division	Apps	Goals	Apps	Goals	Apps	Goals	Apps	Goals
Ergotelis	2012–13	Football League	2	0	0	0	—		2	0
Ergotelis	2013–14	Super League Greece	4	0	0	0	—		4	0
Ergotelis	2014–15	Super League Greece	11	0	3	1	—		14	1
Ergotelis	2015–16	Football League	14	0	5	0	—		19	0
Ergotelis	Total		31	0	8	1	—		39	1
PAS Giannina	2015–16	Super League Greece	1	0	0	0	—		1	0
PAS Giannina	2016–17	Super League Greece	28	0	3	0	2 (Note: Appearances in UEFA Europa League)	1	33	1
PAS Giannina	Total		29	0	3	0	2	1	34	1
Olympiacos	2017–18	Super League Greece	21	1	3	0	9 (Note: Appearance(s) in UEFA Champions League)	0	33	1
Olympiacos	2018–19	Super League Greece	17	0	4	0	3	0	24	0
Olympiacos	2019–20	Super League Greece	6	0	2	0	1	0	9	0
Olympiacos	2022–23	Super League Greece	1	0	0	0	0	0	1	0
Olympiacos	Total		45	1	9	0	13	0	67	1
Mallorca (loan)	2019–20	La Liga	2	0	0	0	—		2	0
Fortuna Düsseldorf (Ioan)	2020–21	2. Bundesliga	15	0	1	0	—		16	0
Fortuna Düsseldorf (Ioan)	2021–22	2. Bundesliga	12	0	1	0	—		13	0
Fortuna Düsseldorf (Ioan)	Total		27	0	2	0	0	0	29	0
Pogoń Szczecin	2022–23	Ekstraklasa	16	2	0	0	—		16	2
Pogoń Szczecin	2023–24	Ekstraklasa	33	1	5	0	4 (Note: Appearances in UEFA Europa Conference League)	0	42	1
Pogoń Szczecin	2024–25	Ekstraklasa	34	0	6	1	—		40	1
Pogoń Szczecin	2025–26	Ekstraklasa	33	0	2	0	—		35	0
Pogoń Szczecin	Total		116	3	13	1	4	0	133	4
Career total			250	4	35	2	19	1	304	7

=== International ===
Appearances and goals by national team and year
National team	Year	Apps	Goals
Greece
Greece	2018	1	0
Greece	2019	4	0
Greece	2020	0	0
Greece	2021	2	0
Total		7	0

== Honours ==
Olympiacos

- Super League Greece: 2019–20
- Greek Cup: 2019–20

Individual

- Super League Greece Team of the Season: 2016–17
