= Georgios Firos =

Greek footballer and manager

Personal information
- Date of birth: 8 November 1953 (age 72)
- Place of birth: Evosmos, Greece
- Height: 1.80 m (5 ft 11 in)
- Position: Centre-back

Senior career*
Years	Team	Apps	(Gls)
1971–1983	Aris	303	(5)
1983–1987	Iraklis	50	(0)

International career
1974–1982	Greece	52	(0)

Managerial career
- 1987: Agrotikos Asteras
- 1987–1990: Anagennisi Giannitsa
- 1990–1991: Kavala
- 1991–1992: Levadiakos
- 1992–1996: Aris
- 1996–1997: AEL
- 1997–1998: Aris
- 1999: Panelefsiniakos
- 2000: PAS Giannina
- 2000: Skoda Xanthi
- 2001: Apollon Kalamarias
- 2001–2002: PAS Giannina
- 2002–2003: Aris
- 2003–2004: OFI
- 2005: Kerkyra
- 2006: Thrasyvoulos
- 2006–2007: Niki Volos
- 2008–2009: Agrotikos Asteras
- 2009–2010: Diagoras
- 2010: Levadiakos
- 2012: Iraklis Psachna
- 2012–2013: Anagennisi Giannitsa (director)
- 2013: Pierikos
- 2014: Aris (director)
- 2014–2015: Iraklis Psachna
- 2015: Aiginiakos
- 2017: Agrotikos Asteras
- * Club domestic league appearances and goals

Georgios Firos (Greek: Γεώργιος Φοιρός; born 8 November 1953) is a Greek football manager and former football player.

== Club career ==
Born in Evosmos, Thessaloniki, Firos played centre-back or sweeper. He was one of the very few players that was consistent in every game played. He played for the team of Aris for many years and finished his career with Iraklis Thessaloniki. Firos made a total of 353 appearances in the Alpha Ethniki.

== International career ==
Firos also has 52 appearances with the Greece national team between 1974 and 1982.

== Managerial career ==
From 1987 to 2017 Firos worked as a manager in various clubs.
