= Goderdzi Natroshvili =

Georgian footballer (born 1970)

Personal information
- Place of birth: Soviet Union
- Position: Midfielder

Senior career*
Years	Team	Apps	(Gls)
–1996	Torpedo Kutaisi		
1996–1997	APEP Pitsilia	23	(6)
1997–1998	Anagennisi Dherynia	21	(4)
1998–1999	Torpedo Kutaisi	0	(0)
1999–2001	Panachaiki	67	(5)
2001–2002	Kalamata	13	(0)

Managerial career
- 2004: PAS Giannina
- * Club domestic league appearances and goals

Goderdzi Natroshvili is a Georgian former professional footballer who played as a midfielder for clubs in the Soviet Union, Cyprus, and Greece.

== Playing career ==
Natroshvili began playing football in the Soviet lower leagues, and moved on to Georgian league clubs. He spent two seasons playing in the Cypriot league before returning to Georgia to play for Torpedo Kutaisi.

In July 1999, Natroshvili joined Greek second division side Panachaiki. He helped the club gain promotion to the Super League Greece and would play the following two seasons in the top flight with Panachaiki. He played less frequently in his last season with the club, making just nine league appearances, and moved to the Greek second division with Kalamata the following season.

== Managerial career ==
Following his playing career, Natroshvili became a football manager. He managed Greek club PAS Giannina F.C. during 2004.
