= Nikos Kovis =

Turkish-Greek footballer and manager

Nikos Kovis (born 6 January 1953), known as Niko Kovi in Turkey, is a Turkish-Greek football player and manager. He was a central defender. He was born in Istanbul.

Nikos Kovis was the Technical Director of the youth academies of Panathinaikos until 2010.

He was the fourth Greek origin football player who played for Turkey, after Fenerbahçe S.K. legend Lefter Küçükandonyadis, legendary İstanbulspor captain Koço Kasapoğlu and Beşiktaş J.K. Aleko Yordan.

There is another Greek player born in Turkey and played for Turkish teams. Alekos Sofianidis was Beşiktaş J.K. left back, but never played for the Turkey national team.

== International career ==
He played for Turkey on four different levels, 5 times A National, 3 times B National, 5 times Under-23, and 3 times for A-Youth.

== Managerial history ==
After he retired Kovis coached Levadiakos F.C., Panargiakos F.C., Proodeftiki F.C., PAS Giannina, EAR, Panarkadikos F.C., Athinaikos F.C. and Apollon Smyrnis F.C.

== Records and honours ==
Kovis won Turkish Cup with Beşiktaş J.K. in 1975, scoring in the second leg against Trabzonspor.

He also won Başbakanlık Kupası (Turkish Presidential Cup) in 1974 scoring the vital goal for Beşiktaş J.K. against Bursaspor.

Kovis won Greek Cup with Panathinaikos in 1982.

== Playing career ==
He began his career with Vefa SK in 1970. After 2 years with Vefa SK, Kovis moved to Beşiktaş J.K. in 1972 and played for 6 seasons. He then was transferred to Panathinaikos in 1978 playing for them for 5 seasons. Kovis also played for OFI for two seasons and retired in 1985.

- 1968–69 Vefa SK 1 games no goal
- 1969–70 Vefa SK 17 games no goal
- 1970–71 Vefa SK 21 games no goal
- 1971–72 Vefa SK 29 games 1 goals
- 1972–73 Vefa SK 29 games 1 goals
- 1973–74 Beşiktaş J.K. 30 games 1 goals
- 1974–75 Beşiktaş J.K. 30 games 2 goals
- 1975–76 Beşiktaş J.K. 27 games 3 goals
- 1976–77 Beşiktaş J.K. 23 games 2 goals
- 1977–78 Beşiktaş J.K. 9 games no goal
- 1978–79 Panathinaikos 28 games
- 1979–80 Panathinaikos 20 goals 1 goal
- 1980–81 Panathinaikos 34 games
- 1981–82 Panathinaikos 24 games no goal
- 1982–83 Panathinaikos 21 games 3 goals
- 1983–84 OFI 13 games no goal
- 1984–85 OFI 15 games 1 goal
