= Thanasis Staikos =

Greek manager and former footballer

Personal information
- Full name: Athanasios Staikos
- Date of birth: 29 November 1980 (age 45)
- Place of birth: Lygourio, Argolis, Greece
- Height: 1.72 m (5 ft 8 in)
- Position: Winger

Team information
- Current team: Hellas Syrou (manager)

Youth career
- 1993–1996: Anagennisi Lygouri

Senior career*
Years	Team	Apps	(Gls)
1996–2000	Anagennisi Lygouri		
2000–2004	Vyzas Megara		
2004–2005	Achaiki		
2005–2006	Ilisiakos		
2006	Kalamata		
2006–2009	Fostiras		
2009–2010	Agia Paraskevi		
2010–2011	Panegialios		
2011–2016	Ermionida		

Managerial career
- 2016–2018: Ermionida
- 2019–2020: Panarkadikos
- 2020–2021: Ermionida
- 2021–2022: PAS Giannina (assistant)
- 2022–2023: PAS Giannina
- 2024: Iraklis
- 2025: Lamia
- 2026–: Hellas Syrou
- * Club domestic league appearances and goals

Thanasis Staikos (Greek: Θανάσης Στάικος; born 29 November 1980) is a Greek professional football manager and former player who currently manages Super League 2 club Hellas Syrou.
