= Iraklis Metaxas =

Greek-German football manager

Personal information
- Date of birth: 10 July 1967 (age 59)
- Place of birth: Cologne, Germany

Team information
- Current team: Fortuna Köln II (manager)

Managerial career
- Years: Team
- 2001–2009: DFB-Jugend (youth, assistant)
- 2008–2009: Germany U19 (assistant)
- 2009–2011: VfL Bochum (assistant)
- 2011–2013: VfL Bochum II
- 2013: SC Freiburg (assistant)
- 2014–2015: SC Freiburg II
- 2015–2016: Greece (assistant)
- 2016–2019: Bayer 04 Leverkusen U19
- 2019–2020: SV Darmstadt 98 (assistant)
- 2020–2021: FC Augsburg (assistant)
- 2021–2022: PAS Giannina
- 2022: Asteras Tripolis
- 2024–2025: SV Eintracht Hohkeppel
- 2025–: Fortuna Köln II (manager)

Iraklis Metaxas (Greek: Ηρακλής Μεταξάς; born 10 July 1967) is a Greek professional football manager who is currently in charge of German club Fortuna Köln II.

== Managing style ==
He is known for applying a heavily defensive approach with no interest whatsoever in offensive tactics.

== Managerial statistics ==
As of match played 27 December 2022

Managerial record by team and tenure
Team	Nat	From	To	Record				
Team	Nat	From	To	G	W	D	L	Win %
VfL Bochum II	(Germany)	1 July 2011	30 June 2013	74	22	21	31	29.73
SC Freiburg II	(Germany)	1 January 2014	22 March 2015	40	18	9	13	45.00
Bayer Leverkusen U19	(Germany)	15 September 2016	23 February 2019	50	24	6	20	48.00
PAS Giannina	(Greece)	1 July 2021	8 June 2022	38	13	10	15	34.21
Asteras Tripolis	(Greece)	9 June 2022	13 November 2022	16	2	8	6	12.50
Career totals				218	79	54	85	36.24
