= Eduardo Ricagni =

Argentine footballer (1926–2010)

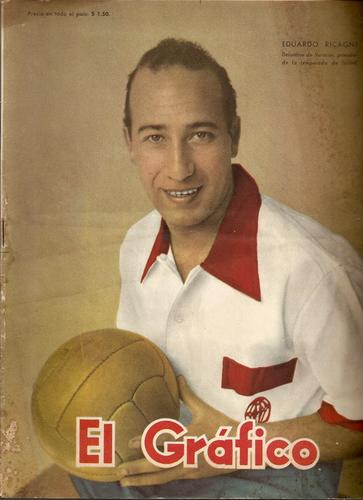

Personal information
- Date of birth: 29 April 1926
- Place of birth: Buenos Aires, Argentina
- Date of death: 1 January 2010
- Position: Winger

Senior career*
Years	Team	Apps	(Gls)
1944–1946	Platense	35	(22)
1947–1949	Boca Juniors	49	(20)
1949–1951	Chacarita Juniors	78	(39)
1951–1952	Montevideo Wanderers	10	(7)
1952–1953	Huracán	41	(36)
1953–1954	Juventus	24	(17)
1954–1956	AC Milan	43	(11)
1956–1958	AC Torino	45	(9)
1958–1959	Catania	28	(2)

International career
1953–1955	Italy	3	(2)
- * Club domestic league appearances and goals as of 00:00, 12 December 2009 (UTC)

Eduardo Ricagni (Italian pronunciation: [eduˈardo riˈkaɲɲi]; born 29 April 1926 – February 2005) was a professional football player and coach. A winger, at club level he won one Italian league title and was the top scorer of the Argentine Primera División in 1952. At International level he was born in Argentina but played for the Italy national team. He later became a coach in Greece.

== Playing career ==
=== Club ===
Ricagni began his career in 1944 with Club Atlético Platense where he scored 22 goals in 35 games. In 1947 he joined Boca Juniors where he scored his only hat-trick and won his only trophy with the club on his debut in a 6–0 win against Federación Tucumana in the Copa Ibarguren 1944. He played a total of 52 games for Boca in all competitions, scoring 23 goals.

In 1949 he joined Chacarita Juniors where he scored 39 goals in 78 league games. He then moved across the Río de La Plata to Montevideo to play for relegation threatened Montevideo Wanderers, he scored 7 goals in 10 games during his brief spell in Uruguay to help the club avoid relegation.

In 1952 he returned to Argentina to join Huracán where he scored 36 goals in 41 games and became the league top scorer in 1952.

In 1953 he was signed by Juventus, he made his debut for the Italian club in a 1–0 home win against Udinese. He scored 17 goals in 24 league games for the club including a hat-trick in his penultimate game for the club in a 4–1 on 23 May 1954.

Ricagni joined AC Milan in July 1954 in preparation for the beginning of the 1954–55 season. He won the Italian championship in his debut season with the club, followed in the next one by the Latin Cup title.

Between 1956 and 1958 he played for AC Torino and he ended his playing career after a season with Catania of Serie B.

=== International ===
Ricagni was eligible to play for the Italy national team as his father Pietro had emigrated from Italy to Argentina in 1912. He was selected to play on three occasions between 1953 and 1955. He made his debut in a 3–0 home win against Czechoslovakia on 13 December 1953 in which he scored a goal.

== Coaching career ==
He was coach of Greek club PAS Giannina in 1974.

== Personal life ==
His son is Eduardos Kontogeorgakis.

== Honours ==
=== Club ===
Boca Juniors

- Copa Ibarguren: 1944

A.C. Milan

- Serie A: 1954–55
- Latin Cup: 1956

=== Individual ===
- Primera División Argentina topscorer: 1952 (28 goals)

== See also ==
- Oriundo
