= 2001–02 Beta Ethniki =

Beta Ethniki
- Season: 2001–02
- Dates: 29 September 2001 – 28 April 2002
- Champions: PAS Giannina
- Promoted: PAS Giannina; Kallithea; Proodeftiki
- Relegated: Agios Nikolaos

Beta Ethniki 2001–02 complete season.

== League table ==
Location of teams in 2001–02 Beta Ethniki

Pos	Team	Pld	W	D	L	GF	GA	GD	Pts	Promotion or relegation
1	PAS Giannina (Note: PAS Giannina had 1 point deducted.) (C, P)	26	15	6	5	38	24	+14	50	Promotion to Alpha Ethniki
2	Kallithea (P)	26	13	8	5	43	24	+19	47 (Note: Head-to-head record: Kallithea: 5 pts (7–4), Proodeftiki: 5 pts (3–6), Apollon Kalamarias: 4 pts (3–3).)	Promotion to Alpha Ethniki
3	Proodeftiki (P)	26	13	8	5	36	24	+12	47	Promotion to Alpha Ethniki
4	Apollon Kalamarias	26	12	11	3	31	12	+19	47	
5	Athinaikos	26	12	4	10	35	31	+4	40	
6	Panserraikos	26	9	9	8	33	27	+6	36	
7	Patraikos	26	9	8	9	26	29	−3	35	
8	Olympiacos Volos	26	8	9	9	22	27	−5	33	
9	Chalkidona	26	8	7	11	32	32	0	31	
10	Paniliakos	26	8	6	12	24	28	−4	30	
11	Kalamata	26	7	8	11	23	31	−8	29	
12	Apollon Smyrnis	26	7	7	12	25	28	−3	28	
13	Panegialios	26	5	6	15	14	38	−24	21	
14	Agios Nikolaos (R)	26	5	5	16	16	43	−27	20	Relegation to Gamma Ethniki

(C) Champions; (P) Promoted; (R) Relegated

== Results ==
Home \ Away	AGN	APL	APS	ATH	CHA	KAL	KLT	EOV	PNG	PNL	PSE	PAS	PTR	PRO
Agios Nikolaos		1–1	0–5	1–1	0–3	0–0	1–1	3–2	3–1	0–0	2–4	1–0	0–2	1–2
Apollon Kalamarias	2–0		1–1	1–0	1–1	4–0	1–1	2–0	3–0	1–0	1–0	2–0	1–0	1–1
Apollon Smyrnis	4–0	0–2		0–1	1–1	2–0	1–0	0–0	2–0	0–1	2–2	1–2	0–0	0–1
Athinaikos	3–0	1–0	0–1		1–3	2–0	2–3	0–0	6–0	1–0	1–0	1–2	3–0	1–0
Chalkidona	0–1	0–0	1–1	3–2		2–1	0–1	1–0	1–2	3–2	1–1	3–0	0–1	0–1
Kalamata	1–0	1–0	1–0	0–0	0–0		1–1	0–2	3–1	1–0	1–1	0–1	3–0	2–2
Kallithea	0–1	1–1	3–0	5–1	3–2	3–1		0–0	2–0	2–1	2–0	2–1	0–0	4–0
Olympiacos Volos	1–0	1–1	0–0	2–2	2–1	1–0	2–4		1–0	2–1	1–0	2–2	0–1	0–0
Panegialios	1–0	0–0	0–1	0–1	1–0	0–3	0–0	1–1		1–1	1–1	0–1	1–1	2–1
Paniliakos	1–0	2–1	2–0	0–2	0–1	3–1	0–1	3–0	1–0		1–0	1–1	2–2	0–0
Panserraikos	2–0	0–2	4–1	3–0	2–1	1–1	0–0	2–0	1–0	2–1		1–1	2–1	0–0
PAS Giannina	2–1	0–0	1–0	2–0	3–0	3–1	3–1	2–1	0–2 (Note: Originally score was 1–1. The game forfeited 2–0 for Panegialios.)	3–0	2–1		3–1	1–0
Patraikos	2–0	1–2	2–1	0–1	3–2	1–1	3–2	0–1	1–0	1–1	1–1	0–0		2–1
Proodeftiki	2–0	0–0	3–1	5–2	2–2	1–0	2–1	1–0	3–0	2–0	3–2	2–2	1–0	

Legend: Blue = home team win; Yellow = draw; Red = away team win.

== Top scorers ==
Rank	Player	Club	Goals
1	(Greece) Theofanis Gekas	Kallithea	14
2	(Greece) Giorgos Zacharopoulos	Chalkidona N.E.	12
3	(Greece) Giannis Lazanas	Patraikos	10
3	(Greece) Alexandros Tatsis	Proodeftiki	10
3	(Greece) Giannis Providas	Athinaikos	10
6	(Greece) Nikolaos Tsimplidis	Kallithea	9
6	(Syria) Said Bayazid	Proodeftiki	9
8	(Serbia and Montenegro) Dušan Jovanović	Panserraikos	8
8	(Greece) Andreas Androutsos	Patraikos	8
