= 1993–94 Balkans Cup =

Tournament details
- Teams: 4

Final positions
- Champions: (Turkey) Samsunspor (1st title)
- Runners-up: (Greece) PAS Giannina

Tournament statistics
- Matches played: 6
- Goals scored: 16 (2.67 per match)

The 1993–94 season of the Balkans Cup club tournament was the last season of the competition before it was abolished. It was won by Turkish side Samsunspor in the final against Greek PAS Giannina for their only title in the competition.

== Semi-finals ==
Team 1	Agg.	Team 2	1st leg	2nd leg
Besa Kavajë (Albania)	1–5	(Greece) PAS Giannina	1–3	0–2
Pirin Blagoevgrad (Bulgaria)	1–4	(Turkey) Samsunspor	0–0	1–4

=== First leg ===
Besa Kavajë (Albania)	1–3	(Greece) PAS Giannina

Pirin Blagoevgrad (Bulgaria)	0–0	(Turkey) Samsunspor

=== Second leg ===
PAS Giannina (Greece)	2–0	(Albania) Besa Kavajë

PAS Giannina won 5–1 on aggregate.

Samsunspor (Turkey)	4–1	(Bulgaria) Pirin Blagoevgrad

Samsunspor won 4–1 on aggregate.

== Finals ==
Team 1	Agg.	Team 2	1st leg	2nd leg
PAS Giannina (Greece)	0–5	(Turkey) Samsunspor	0–3	0–2

=== First leg ===
4 May 1994

PAS Giannina (Greece)	0–3	(Turkey) Samsunspor
		Serkan 31'; Cheregi 46'; İsa 84'

Zosimades Stadium, Ioannina
Referee: Konstantinov (Romania)

=== Second leg ===
11 May 1994

Samsunspor (Turkey)	2–0	(Greece) PAS Giannina
Serdar 15'; Ertuğrul 31'

19 Mayıs Stadium, Samsun
Referee: Yordan Rangelov (Bulgaria)

Samsunspor won 5–0 on aggregate.
