= Giannis Christopoulos (footballer, born 1972) =

Greek football manager (born 1972)

Personal information
- Full name: Ioannis Christopoulos
- Date of birth: 12 November 1972 (age 53)
- Place of birth: Kalamata, Greece

Senior career*
Years	Team	Apps	(Gls)
- Kalamata
- Pamisos Messini

Managerial career
- 2010–2011: Panionios (assistant)
- 2011–2012: PAS Giannina (assistant)
- 2012–2013: PAS Giannina
- 2013–2014: Tavriya Simferopol
- 2014–2015: Platanias
- 2016–2017: Levadiakos
- 2017–2018: Aris Limassol
- 2018–2019: Kalamata
- 2020–2021: Akropolis IF
- * Club domestic league appearances and goals

Giannis Christopoulos (Greek: Γιάννης Χριστόπουλος; born 12 November 1972) is a Greek professional football manager and former player.

== Managerial career ==
=== Greece ===
The long journey began coaching 14 years ago, somewhere in 1999, when the 27 years old coach, finished as a player ( played in Kalamata, Pamisos Messini) and started a new chapter in his career as coach . The academies of Kalamata were those who first opened their doors to welcome the young coach, who after several interviews and resumes, got the approval of the former president of Kalamata Stavros Papadopoulos, who was quite satisfied with the curriculum of the young coach, who had already made his own passage as coach in small groups and academies in Levski Sofia as part of his studies. In the beginning he trained the youth teams, then worked as an assistant coach in the senior teams. In the beginning of 2012–13 season George Christovassilis, president of PAS Giannina gave the opportunity to the young coach to take over for first time as head coach. Giannis Christopoulos lead the team qualified for the Greek Super League Play-Offs.

=== Ukraine ===
On 17 June 2013, he signed a one-year deal with SC Tavriya Simferopol in the Ukrainian Premier League.

== Managerial statistics ==
As of 25 October 2023

Team	Nation	From	To	Record				
Team	Nation	From	To	Played	W	D	L	Win %
PAS Giannina	(Greece)	June 2012	May 2013	43	18	10	15	41.86
Tavriya Simferopol	(Ukraine)	June 2013	January 2014	19	3	2	14	15.79
Platanias	(Greece)	July 2014	March 2015	29	8	7	14	27.59
Levadiakos	(Greece)	January 2017	April 2017	14	2	4	8	14.29
Aris Limassol	(Cyprus)	October 2017	January 2018	15	2	4	9	13.33
Kalamata	(Greece)	July 2018	May 2019	3	1	0	2	33.33
Akropolis IF	(Sweden)	January 2020	At Present	55	17	21	17	30.91
Total				178	51	48	79	28.65

== Honours ==
Individual

- Super League Greece Manager of the Year: 2012–13
