= Olympiacos Volos (sports club) =

Greek multi-sport club

- Full name: Athlitikos Syllogos Olympiakos Volou 1937; Αθλητικός Σύλλογος Ολυμπιακός Βόλου 1937
- Founded: June 2, 1937; 88 years ago
- Colours: Red, White
- Chairman: Nikos Tsekouras
- Website: Club website

A.S. Olympiacos Volos 1937 (full name Athlitikos Syllogos Olympiakos Volou 1937/ Greek: Αθλητικός Σύλλογος Ολυμπιακός Βόλου 1937) is a Greek sports club based in Volos. It was founded on 2 June 1937, and its official colors are red and white. It has teams in football, basketball, swimming, volleyball, weightlifting and judo.

== History ==
The club was founded in 1937 with Apostolos Pourgias as its first president. The team was born in the seaside neighborhood of Volos, Agios Konstantinos. In 1961, it merged with Ethnikos Volos under the name "Ethnikos Olympiacos Volos" and moved from the Anavros stadium to the current Volos Municipal Stadium. It retained the name "Ethnikos Olympiacos Volos" until 2008.

== Sport facilities ==
- Volos Municipal Stadium
- Volos Indoor Hall
- Volos Swimming Pool

== Domestic honours ==
Football team

- Second Division
  - Winners (3): 1966–67, 1970–71, 2009–10
  - Runners-up (5): 1968–69, 1977–78, 1978–79, 1981–82, 1987–88
- Third Division
  - Winners (2): 1998–99, 2018–19 (Group 4)
  - Runners-up (1): 1985–86
- Fourth Division
  - Winners (1): 2006–07

Basketball team

- Greek 4th Division
  - Winners (2): 1991–92, 1999–00
- Provincial Championship
  - Winners (2): 1974, 1982

== Notable supporters ==
- Nikos Boudouris, basketball player and coach

== See also ==
- Volos derby
