= Volos derby =

Football rivalry in Greece

- Native name: Ντέρμπι του Βόλου (Greek)
- Other names: Niki Volos–Olympiacos Volos derby
- Location: Volos, Greece
- Teams: Niki Volos; Olympiacos Volos
- First meeting: 18 April 1937; TFCA Easter Cup; Olympiacos Volos 2–1 Niki Volos
- Latest meeting: 3 April 2025; Super League Greece 2 Olympiacos Volos 1–2 Niki Volos
- Next meeting: TBD
- Stadiums: Panthessaliko Stadium; Volos Municipal Stadium (Olympiacos Volos); Pantelis Magoulas Stadium (Niki Volos)

Statistics
- Total meetings: 110 (official matches)
- Most wins: Niki Volos (46)
- Largest victory: 13 May 1965; Friendly; Niki Volos 11–1 Olympiacos Volos
- Largest goal scoring: Niki Volos (178)

The Volos Derby (Greek: Ντέρμπι του Βόλου), is an association football derby contested between two of the sport clubs of Volos, Niki and Olympiacos.

Together with the matches between Niki Volos and AEL, Trikala and Anagennisi Karditsa, and possibly the matches between Olympiacos Volos and AEL, they constitute the main football derbies of the Greek countryside.

== History ==
=== Clubs' establishment ===
==== Niki Volos ====
The club of Niki Volos was founded on August 19, 1924 by refugees from Asia Minor in the city of Volos. The team's colors are blue and white, the national colors of the Greek flag.

The first offices of Niki were located on the beach (Argonauton and Agiou Nikolaou street). The locker rooms were located in "Kartalio", corner of Polymeri and Kassaveti street. In 1930, the team acquired a privately owned stadium in the Nea Ionia area and was no longer forced to play in the park of Agios Konstantinos in the coastal zone of Volos.

==== Olympiacos Volos ====
The Olympiacos Volos club was founded on June 2, 1937 in the coastal district of Agios Konstantinos. A group of people from the district had formed their own team as early as 1935, which they called "Little Olympiacos" since they were fans of Olympiacos Piraeus. The team's colors were selected red and white, and for the emblem was selected a laurel-crowned teenager. The team's predecessor was the Kentavros Volos F.C., which had existed since 1928, and most of the group of friends who created the Olympiacos team were its players.

The club's first locker room was in a shop in Mefsout Square, while at the end of Gallias Street there was a small plot of land where the team's first training sessions took place. Officially, its founding members in 1937 were Ath. Sekaras, I. Vovos, V. Vasilikos, Ap. Pourgias, I. Alexakis, E. Doulidis, N. Katsanos, K. Konstantas, Diam. Tsourapas, E. Margaritis and others, while the first board of directors was Ap. Pourgias as president, I. Alexakis and Agoritzis as vice presidents, K. Konstantas as Secretary General, Evag. Margaritis as treasurer, Diam. Tsourapas as superintendent, Ioan. Vogiatzi as advisor.

From the early years of the club's founding until 1962 when it moved to the Volos Municipal Stadium, the team had its headquarters at the Hunting Club stadium in Anavros. The first management of Olympiacos Volos had tried to acquire its own space, but without success.

=== First match ===
The two Volos clubs first met as rivals in the TFCA Easter Cup, where Apollon, Keravnos and Odysseas also participated. Their first match in history took place on Sunday, April 18, 1937, with a large crowd and Olympiacos winning 2–1, with two goals from Nikos Malavetas, while Priamos Chiotakis scored for Niki.

The teams' starting lineups in that first match between them were as follows, for Niki: Asimis, Vouroukos, Niarchos, Spanopoulos, Vernikas, Kremmidas, Papazoglou, Polis, Tsagaris, Priamos, Bonos and for Olympiacos: Hypermachos, Vogiatzis, Galanis, Chiotis, Paschos, Zifkos, Bagios, Papathanasiou, Zisis, Malavetas and Apostolidis.

=== Niki – Olympiacos 11–1 ===
On May 13, 1965, a friendly match was held in which the Nea Ionia team defeated Olympiacos Volos by a wide margin of 11–1. The goals for Niki were scored by Kasapleris (2 goals), Zanteroglou, Papadaniil, Kouklakis (2 goals), Morakis, Karailiou, Lefakis, Valachas, Kalliotzis, while for Olympiacos Volos the only goal was scored by Gialatzis. This score remains to this day the largest and widest in a match between the two teams, even though it was a friendly match.

== Statistics ==
=== Football ===
==== Head-to-head ====
	Niki wins	Draws	Olympiacos wins
TFCA Championship
At Niki home	12	5	5
At Olympiacos home	11	4	6
Total	23	9	11
Beta Ethniki / Football League / Super League Greece 2
At Niki home	6	9	2
At Olympiacos home	3	2	12
Total	9	11	14
Gamma Ethniki / Football League
At Niki home	5	4	0
At Olympiacos home	1	3	5
Total	6	7	5
Greek Cup
At Niki home	7	0	2
At Olympiacos home	0	0	4
Total	7	0	6
Volos Cup / TFCA Cup
At Niki home	1	0	0
At Olympiacos home	0	0	1
Total	1	0	1
Total
110	46	27	37

==== Records ====
- Niki Volos:
  - Home: Niki Volos – Olympiacos Volos 8–1, Pantelis Magoulas Stadium, 18 May 1946
  - Away: Olympiacos Volos – Niki Volos 1–6, Anavros Stadium, 12 March 1961
- Olympiacos Volos:
  - Home: Olympiacos Volos – Niki Volos 6–1, Pantelis Magoulas Stadium, 4 February 1940
  - Away: Niki Volos – Olympiacos Volos 0–3, Pantelis Magoulas Stadium, 26 May 1940

=== Men's Basketball ===
==== Head-to-head ====
	Niki wins	Olympiacos wins
Greek B Basket League
At Niki home	6	2
At Olympiacos home	6	2
Total	12	4
Greek C Basket League
At Niki home	7	4
At Olympiacos home	3	7
Total	10	11
ESKATH Championship
At Niki home	2	1
At Olympiacos home	0	3
Total	2	4
Greek Cup
At Niki home	1	0
At Olympiacos home	0	0
Total	1	0
Total
44	25	19

==== Records ====
- Niki Volos:
  - Home: Niki Volos – Olympiacos Volos 87–51 (+36), Pantelis Magoulas Stadium, 26 June 1975
  - Away: Olympiacos Volos – Niki Volos 46–78 (+32), Volos Indoor Hall, 19 February 1984
- Olympiacos Volos:
  - Home: Olympiacos Volos – Niki Volos 57–39 (+18), Volos Indoor Hall, 1 November 1998
  - Away: Niki Volos – Olympiacos Volos 66–83 (+17), Volos Indoor Hall, 10 April 1983

=== Women's Basketball ===
==== Head-to-head ====
	Niki wins	Olympiacos wins
Greek A2 Basket League
At Niki home	0	1
At Olympiacos home	0	1
Total	0	2
ESKATH Championship
At Niki home	2	2
At Olympiacos home	2	2
Total	4	4
Total
10	4	6

==== Records ====
- Niki Volos:
  - Home: Niki Volos – Olympiacos Volos 65–25 (+40), Nea Ionia Indoor Hall, 24 November 2019
  - Away: Olympiacos Volos – Niki Volos 45–66 (+21), Volos Indoor Hall, 16 February 2020
- Olympiacos Volos:
  - Home: Olympiacos Volos – Niki Volos 73–26 (+47), Volos Indoor Hall, 24 January 2016
  - Away: Niki Volos – Olympiacos Volos 28–53 (+25), Nea Ionia Indoor Hall, 18 October 2015

== Football matches list ==
=== TFCA Championship ===
	Niki – Olympiacos			Olympiacos – Niki		
Season	Date	Venue	Score	Date	Venue	Score
1937–38	27–02–1938	Pantelis Magoulas Stadium	2–1	17–04–1938	Pantelis Magoulas Stadium	0–3
1938–39	02–03–1939	Pantelis Magoulas Stadium	0–1	15–01–1939	Pantelis Magoulas Stadium	0–0
1939–40	26–05–1940	Pantelis Magoulas Stadium	0–3	07–04–1940	Pantelis Magoulas Stadium	6–1
1945–46	12–05–1946	Pantelis Magoulas Stadium	2–0	20–01–1946	Pantelis Magoulas Stadium	3–0
1946–47	21–03–1947	Pantelis Magoulas Stadium	0–2 ^{1}	16–02–1947	Pantelis Magoulas Stadium	1–0
1947–48	08–02–1948	Pantelis Magoulas Stadium	2–1	04–04–1948	Anavros Stadium	1–2
1948–49	03–04–1949	Pantelis Magoulas Stadium	2–4	27–02–1949	Anavros Stadium	1–2
1949–50	30–04–1950	Pantelis Magoulas Stadium	1–2	07–05–1950	Anavros Stadium	0–1
1950–51	28–01–1951	Pantelis Magoulas Stadium	2–2	27–05–1951	Anavros Stadium	2–5
1951–52	06–04–1952	Pantelis Magoulas Stadium	1–1	13–01–1952	Anavros Stadium	1–0
1952–53	08–03–1953	Pantelis Magoulas Stadium	1–1	03–05–1953	Anavros Stadium	1–2
1953–54	13–12–1953	Pantelis Magoulas Stadium	3–1	01–11–1953	Anavros Stadium	3–3
1954–55	28–10–1954	Pantelis Magoulas Stadium	4–2	14–11–1954	Anavros Stadium	2–0
1955–56	04–12–1955	Pantelis Magoulas Stadium	4–1	18–12–1955	Anavros Stadium	1–1
1956–57	21–10–1956	Pantelis Magoulas Stadium	4–0	14–11–1956	Anavros Stadium	1–5
1957–58	20–10–1957	Pantelis Magoulas Stadium	0–0	24–11–1957	Anavros Stadium	0–1
1958–59	16–11–1958	Pantelis Magoulas Stadium	2–2	14–09–1958	Anavros Stadium	1–2
1959–60	28–10–1959	Pantelis Magoulas Stadium	4–0	15–11–1959	Anavros Stadium	0–2
1960–61	03–10–1960	Pantelis Magoulas Stadium	5–0	07–11–1960	Anavros Stadium	1–2
1960–61	27–11–1960	Pantelis Magoulas Stadium	6–0	18–12–1960	Anavros Stadium	2–2

^{1} In this match, Niki Volos win Olympiacos 3–2. However, after an appeal by Olympiacos, the match was awarded to them.

1st place play-off match – Title match

Season	Date	Venue	Match	Score
1945–46	18–05–1946	Pantelis Magoulas Stadium	Niki – Olympiacos	8–1
1952–53	17–05–1953	Pantelis Magoulas Stadium	Niki – Olympiacos	4–3
1954–55	19–12–1954	Alcazar Stadium	Olympiacos – Niki	1–0

=== Beta Ethniki / Football League / Super League Greece 2 ===
	Niki – Olympiacos				Olympiacos – Niki			
Season	R.	Date	Venue	Score	R.	Date	Venue	Score
1960–61	1	08–01–1961	Pantelis Magoulas Stadium	2–1	10	12–03–1961	Anavros Stadium	1–6
1966–67	4	17–11–1966	Pantelis Magoulas Stadium	0–0	21	02–03–1967	Volos Municipal Stadium	2–0
1968–69	22	15–06–1969	Pantelis Magoulas Stadium	2–1	5	03–11–1968	Volos Municipal Stadium	2–0
1976–77	20	12–12–1976	Pantelis Magoulas Stadium	0–0	1	13–02–1977	Volos Municipal Stadium	3–2
1977–78	14	18–12–1977	Pantelis Magoulas Stadium	1–2	33	14–05–1978	Volos Municipal Stadium	1–0
1978–79	22	11–02–1979	Pantelis Magoulas Stadium	0–0	3	01–10–1978	Volos Municipal Stadium	2–0
1979–80	2	16–09–1979	Pantelis Magoulas Stadium	1–1	21	03–02–1980	Volos Municipal Stadium	2–1
1980–81	38	31–05–1981	Pantelis Magoulas Stadium	1–2	19	11–01–1980	Volos Municipal Stadium	4–3
1981–82	1	13–09–1981	Pantelis Magoulas Stadium	3–1	20	14–02–1982	Volos Municipal Stadium	2–1
1982–83	37	05–06–1983	Pantelis Magoulas Stadium	1–1	18	16–01–1983	Volos Municipal Stadium	2–0
1983–84	33	06–05–1984	Pantelis Magoulas Stadium	0–0	14	04–12–1983	Volos Municipal Stadium	2–0
2004–05	12	20–12–2004	Panthessaliko Stadium	1–0	27	23–04–2005	Volos Municipal Stadium	1–0
2005–06	5	22–10–2005	Panthessaliko Stadium	2–0	20	18–02–2006	Volos Municipal Stadium	2–1
2012–13	35	20–04–2013	Panthessaliko Stadium	1–1	14	16–12–2012	Panthessaliko Stadium	0–0
2012–13	p-o	16–06–2013	Panthessaliko Stadium	1–1	p-o	05–06–2013	Panthessaliko Stadium	1–1
2013–14	p-o	11–05–2014	Panthessaliko Stadium	0–0	p-o	13–04–2013	Volos Municipal Stadium	0–1
2021–22	5	27–01–2022	Panthessaliko Stadium	1–0	18	02–04–2022	Neapoli Volos Municipal Stadium	1–2

=== Gamma Ethniki / Football League ===
	Niki – Olympiacos				Olympiacos – Niki			
Season	R.	Date	Venue	Score	R.	Date	Venue	Score
1984–85	26	24–02–1985	Pantelis Magoulas Stadium	3–0	6	07–10–1984	Volos Municipal Stadium	2–0
1985–86	19	26–01–1986	Volos Municipal Stadium	2–0	38	15–06–1986	Volos Municipal Stadium	0–0
1994–95	6	28–12–1994	Pantelis Magoulas Stadium	1–0	23	02–04–1995	Volos Municipal Stadium	1–0
1995–96	27	21–04–1996	Pantelis Magoulas Stadium	3–1	10	06–01–1996	Volos Municipal Stadium	1–1
2007–08	27	04–05–2008	Panthessaliko Stadium	1–1	10	16–01–2008	Volos Municipal Stadium	2–1
2016–17	11	04–12–2016	Pantelis Magoulas Stadium	0–0	26	23–04–2017	Panthessaliko Stadium	4–0
2017–18	8	12–11–2017	Panthessaliko Stadium	1–1	21	25–02–2018	Panthessaliko Stadium	1–3
2018–19	6	04–11–2018	Panthessaliko Stadium	0–0	19	17–02–2019	Panthessaliko Stadium	2–0
2019–20	8	16–11–2019	Neapoli Volos Municipal Stadium	2–0	21	22–02–2020	Neapoli Volos Municipal Stadium	1–1

=== Greek Cup ===
Season	Date	Venue	Match	Score	Winner
1938–39	22–01–1939	Pantelis Magoulas Stadium	Niki – Olympiacos	4–1	NIK
1939–40	05–02–1940	Pantelis Magoulas Stadium	Niki – Olympiacos	0–2	OLY
1946–47	17–11–1946	Pantelis Magoulas Stadium	Niki – Olympiacos	4–3	NIK
1948–49	05–12–1948	Anavros Stadium	Olympiacos – Niki	3–1	OLY
1949–50	24–11–1949	Pantelis Magoulas Stadium	Niki – Olympiacos	1–2	OLY
1950–51	26–11–1952	Anavros Stadium	Olympiacos – Niki	1–0	OLY
1952–53	21–12–1952	Anavros Stadium	Olympiacos – Niki	1–0	OLY
1953–54	26–12–1953	Pantelis Magoulas Stadium	Niki – Olympiacos	5–0	NIK
1955–56	01–04–1956	Pantelis Magoulas Stadium	Niki – Olympiacos	3–2 (a.e.t.)	NIK
1956–57	26–06–1957	Pantelis Magoulas Stadium	Niki – Olympiacos	4–2	NIK
1957–58	09–03–1958	Pantelis Magoulas Stadium	Niki – Olympiacos	5–3	NIK
1966–67	23–02–1967	Pantelis Magoulas Stadium	Niki – Olympiacos	1–0	NIK
1968–69	26–12–1968	Volos Municipal Stadium	Olympiacos – Niki	3–1	OLY

=== Volos Cup / TFCA Cup ===
Season	Competition	Date	Venue	Match	Score	Winner
1943–44	Volos Cup	18–04–1944	Pantelis Magoulas Stadium	Niki – Olympiacos	2–0 (w/o) ^{1}	NIK
2018–19	TFCA Cup	14–11–2018	Panthessaliko Stadium	Olympiacos – Niki	3–2	OLY

^{1} This match was interrupted during 85th minute, while the score was tied at 1-1, due to incidents that caused the Olympiacos team to withdraw. The match was ultimately awarded to Niki.

=== Friendly matches ===
Date	Match	Score
18–04–1937	Olympiacos – Niki	1–0
04–07–1937	Olympiacos – Niki	1–0
26–10–1937	Olympiacos – Niki	0–0
12–12–1937	Niki – Olympiacos	3–2
16–01–1938	Niki – Olympiacos	4–4
25–09–1938	Niki – Olympiacos	3–5
16–10–1938	Olympiacos – Niki	0–5
16–07–1939	Olympiacos – Niki	3–2
11–02–1940	Olympiacos – Niki	2–0
28–04–1940	Olympiacos – Niki	2–1
09–09–1940	Niki – Olympiacos	0–4
06–10–1940	Olympiacos – Niki	5–2
01–01–1944	Niki – Olympiacos	1–1
13–05–1945	Niki – Olympiacos	0–3
24–06–1945	Niki – Olympiacos	2–0
01–07–1945	Niki – Olympiacos	2–3
23–12–1945	Niki – Olympiacos	1–0
09–12–1946	Olympiacos – Niki	1–1
16–12–1946	Niki – Olympiacos	3–2
14–12–1947	Olympiacos – Niki	1–1
05–01–1948	Niki – Olympiacos	1–0
03–05–1948	Niki – Olympiacos	2–1
12–09–1948	Olympiacos – Niki	10–2
17–10–1948	Niki – Olympiacos	3–0
30–01–1949	Niki – Olympiacos	4–1
18–09–1949	Olympiacos – Niki	1–1
15–01–1950	Olympiacos – Niki	2–3
09–04–1950	Niki – Olympiacos	4–2
12–04–1950	Olympiacos – Niki	3–1
25–04–1950	Olympiacos – Niki	7–1
18–06–1950	Niki – Olympiacos	4–2
03–09–1950	Olympiacos – Niki	0–2
18–09–1950	Niki – Olympiacos	1–1
29–10–1950	Niki – Olympiacos	2–2
21–01–1951	Niki – Olympiacos	2–2
11–02–1951	Niki – Olympiacos	1–1
06–05–1951	Olympiacos – Niki	3–0
10–06–1951	Niki – Olympiacos	0–0
14–10–1951	Niki – Olympiacos	0–1
28–10–1951	Niki – Olympiacos	2–1
21–04–1952	Niki – Olympiacos	4–1
19–10–1952	Niki – Olympiacos	4–2
23–08–1953	Niki – Olympiacos	5–1
21–03–1954	Niki – Olympiacos	2–2^{4}
11–04–1954	Niki – Olympiacos	0–2
13–06–1954	Olympiacos – Niki	5–4
03–10–1954	Niki – Olympiacos	3–1
15–05–1955	Olympiacos – Niki	1–0
10–07–1955	Niki – Olympiacos	2–0
25–09–1955	Olympiacos – Niki	1–0

Date	Match	Score
29–04–1956	Niki – Olympiacos	3–2
16–09–1956	Niki – Olympiacos	2–0
04–11–1956	Niki – Olympiacos	1–0
14–04–1957	Olympiacos – Niki	2–1
16–02–1958	Niki – Olympiacos	6–1
20–04–1958	Niki – Olympiacos	10–1
22–06–1958	Niki – Olympiacos	8–1
01–07–1958	Olympiacos – Niki	2–1
11–01–1959	Niki – Olympiacos	1–0
08–03–1959	Niki – Olympiacos	3–0
18–05–1961	Olympiacos – Niki	4–2
02–01–1962	Niki – Olympiacos	3–0
01–05–1962	Niki – Olympiacos	3–1
09–09–1962	Olympiacos – Niki	0–0
08–09–1963	Olympiacos – Niki	1–2
13–05–1965	Niki – Olympiacos	11–1
23–07–1969	Niki – Olympiacos	2–0
01–09–1969	Olympiacos – Niki	2–1
06–01–1971	Olympiacos – Niki	3–0
22–08–1973	Olympiacos – Niki	2–1
24–08–1975	Olympiacos – Niki	1–1
26–08–1978	Olympiacos – Niki	2–4
21–08–1982	Olympiacos – Niki	0–0
24–08–1983	Olympiacos – Niki	3–0
25–08–1985	Olympiacos – Niki	2–0
01–09–1985	Olympiacos – Niki	1–2
11–08–1991	Olympiacos – Niki	1–0
07–08–1994	Olympiacos – Niki	1–2
08–09–1996	Olympiacos – Niki	1–0
06–08–2006	ASK Olympiacos – Niki	2–1
23–08–2017	Olympiacos – Niki	1–1
15–04–2018	Niki – Olympiacos	2–4

^{4} The match was interrupted in the 85th minute after incidents that started on the pitch and spread to the stands, while fans entered the pitch and clashed with players. Both teams were disqualified by decision of the Thessaly FCA.

== Basketball matches list ==
=== Men's ===
==== Greek B Basket League ====
	Niki – Olympiacos			Olympiacos – Niki		
Season	Date	Venue	Score	Date	Venue	Score
1974–75	29–06–1975	Pantelis Magoulas Stadium	87–51	01–06–1975	Volos Municipal Stadium	65–83
1975–76	19–06–1976	Pantelis Magoulas Stadium	75–43	28–03–1976	Volos Municipal Stadium	57–74
1976–77	28–11–1976	Pantelis Magoulas Stadium	81–53	24–04–1977	G.S. Volos Indoor Hall	55–64
1982–83	10–04–1983	Volos Indoor Hall	66–83	09–01–1983	Volos Indoor Hall	54–66
1983–84	06–11–1983	Volos Indoor Hall	86–64	19–02–1984	Volos Indoor Hall	46–78
1994–95	27–11–1994	Nea Ionia Indoor Hall	62–68	19–03–1995	Volos Indoor Hall	83–80
2021–22	20–03–2022	Nea Ionia Indoor Hall	84–72	28–11–2021	Volos Indoor Hall	78–73
2022–23	01–04–2023	Nea Ionia Indoor Hall	75–59	21–12–2022	Volos Indoor Hall	80–93

==== Greek C Basket League ====
	Niki – Olympiacos			Olympiacos – Niki		
Season	Date	Venue	Score	Date	Venue	Score
1988–89	23–11–1988	Volos Indoor Hall	63–55	28–01–1989	Volos Indoor Hall	70–71
1989–90	06–05–1990	Volos Indoor Hall	94–96	07–01–1990	Volos Indoor Hall	71–69
1990–91	25–11–1990	Volos Indoor Hall	79–68	10–02–1991	Volos Indoor Hall	68–74
1991–92	05–04–1992	Volos Indoor Hall	86–97	12–01–1992	Volos Indoor Hall	86–82
1998–99	07–03–1999	Nea Ionia Indoor Hall	61–74	01–11–1998	Volos Indoor Hall	57–39
1999–2000	19–12–1999	Nea Ionia Indoor Hall	76–67	16–04–2000	Volos Indoor Hall	89–75
2002–03	19–01–2003	Nea Ionia Indoor Hall	79–70	04–05–2003	Volos Indoor Hall	87–81
2003–04	22–02–2004	Nea Ionia Indoor Hall	91–77	09–11–2003	Volos Indoor Hall	84–94
2004–05	31–10–2004	Nea Ionia Indoor Hall	71–72	13–02–2005	Volos Indoor Hall	92–80
2008–09	26–10–2008	Nea Ionia Indoor Hall	70–65	01–02–2009	Volos Indoor Hall	74–65
2019–20	24–11–2019	Nea Ionia Indoor Hall	81–72	15–03–2020	Volos Indoor Hall	Not Held

==== ESKATH Championship ====
	Niki – Olympiacos			Olympiacos – Niki		
Season	Date	Venue	Score	Date	Venue	Score
1986–87	24–01–1987	Volos Indoor Hall	79–52	25–10–1986	Volos Indoor Hall	57–51
2015–16	05–03–2016	Nea Ionia Indoor Hall	65–82	12–12–2015	Volos Indoor Hall	75–73
2016–17	11–02–2017	Nea Ionia Indoor Hall	83–58	19–11–2016	Volos Indoor Hall	67–66

==== Greek Cup ====
Season	Date	Venue	Match	Score	Winner
1975–76	06–06–1976	Pantelis Magoulas Stadium	Niki – Olympiacos	59–45	NIK

=== Women's ===
==== Greek A2 Basket League ====
	Niki – Olympiacos			Olympiacos – Niki		
Season	Date	Venue	Score	Date	Venue	Score
2015–16	18–10–2015	Nea Ionia Indoor Hall	28–53	24–01–2016	Volos Indoor Hall	73–26

==== ESKATH Championship ====
	Niki – Olympiacos			Olympiacos – Niki		
Season	Date	Venue	Score	Date	Venue	Score
2019–20	24–11–2019	Nea Ionia Indoor Hall	65–25	16–02–2020	Volos Indoor Hall	45–66
2021–22	12–12–2021	Nea Ionia Indoor Hall	55–35	12–02–2022	Volos Indoor Hall	36–53
2022–23	22–01–2023	Nea Ionia Indoor Hall	46–53	20–11–2022	Volos Indoor Hall	65–29
2023–24	31–10–2023	Nea Ionia Indoor Hall	36–53	19–12–2023	Volos Indoor Hall	61–40
2026–27	09–01–2027	Nea Ionia Indoor Hall		07–11–2026	Volos Indoor Hall	

== Fans ==
The two teams have supporters and fans from Volos and all over Magnesia Prefecture.

=== Niki Volos ===
They are considered ardent fans as for them Niki is a sacred symbol of the refugees who settled in Nea Ionia after the Asia Minor Catastrophe.

The oldest fan association of Niki Volos is the Niki Volos Fans' Association (Omilos Filathlon Nikis), which was founded in 1974. A later fan association is the Blue Club - Gate 3 "P. Ntokouzis” which was created in 1985. The name of the association bears the name of one of its founding members, who lost his life in a traffic accident in 1997. In 2020, it was characterized as one of the 10 recognized associations nationwide. A few years later, in 1994, another association of organized fans, Blue Angels, was founded. In this association, its members characterize the youth fan movement and it has not yet been officially recognized. In fact, the team is also supported outside the prefecture of Magnesia. It is indicative that there are fan associations in Athens and Thessaloniki.

=== Olympiacos Volos ===
Olympiacos Volos represents the residents of the city center of Volos. Olympiacos Volos fans are called "Austrians". They are considered moderate fans and more measured in terms of their culture and behavior on the field, without this meaning that they have not participated in incidents.

The oldest fan association is the Olympiacos Volos Fans' Association (Syndesmos Filathlon Olympiakou Volos, S.F.O.V.) founded in 1971. The main organized fan associations are the Austrian Boys founded in 2003, the Vatos Locos founded in 2010 and the Malavetas founded in 2013. The members of these associations are hardcore and ardent fans.

== Nea Ionia Derby ==
The Nea Ionia Derby refers to the athletic match between the teams of Niki Volos and Iraklis Volos.

=== Statistics ===
==== Head-to-head ====
	Niki wins	Draws	Iraklis wins
TFCA Championship
At Niki home	3	0	0
At Iraklis home	3	0	0
Total	6	0	0
Delta Ethniki
At Niki home	0	0	1
At Iraklis home	1	0	0
Total	1	0	1
Greek Cup
At Niki home	1	0	0
At Olympiacos home	0	0	0
Total	1	0	0
TFCA Super Cup
At Niki home	1	0	0
At Olympiacos home	0	0	0
Total	1	0	0
Total
10	9	0	1

=== Matches ===
==== TFCA Championship ====
	Niki – Iraklis		Iraklis – Niki	
Season	Venue	Score	Venue	Score
1937–38	Pantelis Magoulas Stadium	5–1	Pantelis Magoulas Stadium	0–1
1960–61	Pantelis Magoulas Stadium	4–0	Pantelis Magoulas Stadium	0–6
1975–76	Pantelis Magoulas Stadium	5–0	Pantelis Magoulas Stadium	0–2

==== Delta Ethniki ====
	Niki – Iraklis				Iraklis– Niki			
Season	R.	Date	Venue	Score	R.	Date	Venue	Score
1992–93	38	23–05–1993	Pantelis Magoulas Stadium	2–4	19	10–01–1993	Pantelis Magoulas Stadium	1–2

=== Greek Cup ===
Season	Date	Venue	Match	Score	Winner
1959–60	20–09–1959	Pantelis Magoulas Stadium	Niki – Iraklis	4–0	NIK

==== TFCA Super Cup ====
Season	Date	Venue	Match	Score	Winner
2016–17	05–09–2016	Pantelis Magoulas Stadium	Niki – Iraklis	0–0 (a.e.t.); (3–1 p)	NIK
