= 1984–85 Beta Ethniki =

Beta Ethniki
- Season: 1984–85
- Dates: 2 September 1984 – 9 June 1985
- Champions: PAS Giannina
- Promoted: PAS Giannina; Panserraikos
- Relegated: Almopos Aridea; Xanthi; Korinthos; Rodos

Beta Ethniki 1984–85 complete season.

== League table ==
Location of teams in 1984–85 Beta Ethniki

Pos	Team	Pld	W	D	L	GF	GA	GD	Pts	Promotion or relegation
1	PAS Giannina (C, P)	38	20	10	8	64	28	+36	50	Promotion to Alpha Ethniki
2	Panserraikos (P)	38	19	11	8	52	34	+18	49	Promotion to Alpha Ethniki
3	Kavala	38	20	5	13	53	30	+23	45	
4	Levadiakos	38	20	5	13	63	44	+19	45	
5	Acharnaikos	38	18	8	12	58	46	+12	44	
6	Diagoras Rodos	38	12	14	12	43	40	+3	38	
7	Athinaikos	38	14	10	14	45	49	−4	38	
8	Atromitos	38	13	12	13	36	50	−14	38	
9	Agrotikos Asteras	38	16	5	17	58	51	+7	37	
10	Veria	38	14	9	15	47	50	−3	37	
11	Edessaikos	38	11	15	12	34	39	−5	37	
12	Makedonikos	38	14	9	15	44	51	−7	37	
13	Aiolikos	38	13	11	14	42	50	−8	37	
14	Trikala	38	12	12	14	41	48	−7	36	
15	Kastoria	38	14	7	17	45	48	−3	35	
16	Proodeftiki	38	12	11	15	37	44	−7	35	
17	Almopos Aridea (Note: Almopos Arideas had 1 point deducted.) (R)	38	13	8	17	49	65	−16	33	Relegation to Gamma Ethniki
18	Xanthi (R)	38	14	4	20	41	46	−5	32	Relegation to Gamma Ethniki
19	Korinthos (R)	38	9	13	16	40	40	0	31	Relegation to Gamma Ethniki
20	Rodos (R)	38	8	9	21	25	63	−38	25	Relegation to Gamma Ethniki

(C) Champions; (P) Promoted; (R) Relegated

== Results ==
Home \ Away	ACH	AGR	AIO	ALM	ATH	ATR	DIA	EDE	KAS	KAV	KOR	LEV	MAK	PSE	PAS	PRO	ROD	TRI	VER	XAN
Acharnaikos		4–2	2–0	3–1	3–2	3–1	1–1	1–1	2–1	2–0	2–1	2–0	1–0	1–1	2–1	2–0	3–0	3–0	2–1	2–1
Agrotikos Asteras	1–0		6–0	2–0	1–2	3–2	1–0	0–0	4–1	0–1	3–2	1–2	3–2	1–3	4–3	2–1	4–0	2–1	6–1	2–1
Aiolikos	3–1	1–0		1–4	1–1	0–0	2–1	0–0	3–1	1–0	2–1	3–0	3–1	1–1	0–0	1–0	1–0	2–2	1–0	2–0
Almopos Aridea	3–1	1–0	0–0		3–1	1–1	1–0	2–2	2–1	2–0	3–2	0–2	4–1	2–0	1–0	1–1	1–0	0–2	2–2	4–1
Athinaikos	4–3	0–1	2–1	2–0		1–1	2–0	1–2	1–0	1–1	2–1	2–0	0–1	0–1	2–0	0–0	3–0	1–1	2–1	2–1
Atromitos	1–1	1–1	3–1	2–2	1–0		0–0	1–0	3–0	2–1	2–1	1–0	2–0	1–1	2–1	1–0	1–0	0–0	0–0	2–0
Diagoras Rodos	2–1	3–0	2–2	1–1	1–1	3–1		0–0	1–0	1–0	0–0	2–0	3–1	4–2	1–2	1–1	1–1	2–0	4–1	0–0
Edessaikos	1–1	2–3	2–0	1–0	2–0	1–0	1–1		0–0	0–0	1–0	1–0	1–1	3–0	1–3	1–1	0–0	2–0	1–0	2–0
Kastoria	2–0	0–0	1–0	1–0	2–0	3–0	1–1	1–0		4–1	1–1	1–0	1–0	2–0	0–0	1–0	3–0	5–1	1–1	3–0
Kavala	1–0	1–0	2–1	5–0	3–0	0–1	3–0	2–1	1–0		1–0	2–1	4–0	4–0	1–0	2–0	4–0	2–1	4–0	4–0
Korinthos	1–0	3–0	1–2	6–1	1–1	3–0	1–0	1–1	3–1	0–0		1–1	1–0	0–0	0–0	1–0	1–0	1–2	0–0	0–0
Levadiakos	2–2	2–1	3–0	3–1	3–1	4–1	2–0	3–1	3–2	0–0	2–1		1–0	2–0	3–0	2–0	4–0	2–1	6–1	2–1
Makedonikos	3–1	1–0	1–0	2–1	1–1	1–1	1–1	1–0	2–2	1–0	0–0	3–0		0–1	1–1	3–0	2–0	1–0	2–0	3–2
Panserraikos	2–0	1–0	1–1	6–1	2–1	1–0	2–0	4–0	4–0	0–0	3–1	2–0	4–2		0–0	1–1	2–1	1–0	1–0	1–0
PAS Giannina	2–0	1–0	1–0	3–1	4–0	2–0	4–0	4–0	4–0	3–0	1–0	2–1	3–0	2–2		1–0	5–0	1–1	2–1	2–0
Proodeftiki	1–2	3–2	3–1	1–1	1–1	3–0	1–0	2–0	2–1	2–1	3–2	2–1	1–1	0–0	0–0		0–0	2–1	1–0	2–0
Rodos	1–1	0–0	2–2	2–0	1–2	1–1	0–2	2–2	2–0	2–1	1–0	1–2	0–2	2–1	1–0	3–1		0–2	1–1	1–0
Trikala	0–0	1–1	2–2	2–1	1–0	4–0	0–3	1–1	3–1	2–0	2–2	1–1	2–0	1–0	1–1	2–0	1–0		0–3	1–0
Veria	2–1	2–1	2–1	2–0	1–2	2–0	1–1	2–0	2–1	0–1	2–0	3–2	2–2	0–0	2–0	3–0	4–0	0–0		2–0
Xanthi	0–2	2–0	1–0	3–1	0–1	5–0	2–0	1–0	1–0	1–0	0–0	1–1	4–0	1–0	1–3	2–1	3–0	4–0	2–0	

Legend: Blue = home team win; Yellow = draw; Red = away team win.

== Top scorers ==
Rank	Player	Club	Goals
1	(Greece) Kostas Paraskevopoulos	Almopos Aridea	19
2	(Greece) Nikos Vakoufaris	Agrotikos Asteras	16
2	(Greece) Giannis Papadopoulos	Edessaikos	16
2	(Greece) Ioannis Gambetas	Trikala	16
5	(Greece) Theodoros Gyftakis	Skoda Xanthi	15
5	(Greece) Kopanidis	Proodeftiki	15
