= 1976–77 Beta Ethniki =

Beta Ethniki
- Season: 1976–77
- Dates: 3 October 1976 – 19 June 1977
- Champions: Egaleo (South); Veria (North)
- Promoted: Egaleo; Veria
- Relegated: Orfeas Egaleo; Paniliakos; Kalamata; Koropi; Anagennisi Arta; Kampaniakos; Ethnikos Sidirokastro; Kozani

Beta Ethniki 1976–77 complete season.

== South Group ==
=== League table ===
| Pos | Team | Pld | W | D | L | GF | GA | GD | Pts | Promotion or relegation |
|---|---|---|---|---|---|---|---|---|---|---|
| 1 | Egaleo (C, P) | 38 | 21 | 12 | 5 | 68 | 32 | +36 | 54 | Promotion to Alpha Ethniki |
| 2 | Korinthos | 38 | 20 | 11 | 7 | 56 | 26 | +30 | 51 | |
| 3 | Rodos | 38 | 22 | 6 | 10 | 73 | 41 | +32 | 50 | |
| 4 | Proodeftiki | 38 | 19 | 13 | 6 | 59 | 31 | +28 | 47 (Note: ?4 points deducted?) | |
| 5 | Panarkadikos | 38 | 19 | 13 | 6 | 49 | 36 | +13 | 47 (Note: ?4 points deducted?) | |
| 6 | Ilisiakos | 38 | 17 | 9 | 12 | 51 | 35 | +16 | 43 | |
| 7 | Panelefsiniakos | 38 | 18 | 6 | 14 | 42 | 33 | +9 | 42 | |
| 8 | Ethnikos Asteras | 38 | 14 | 11 | 13 | 42 | 44 | −2 | 39 | |
| 9 | Kallithea | 38 | 13 | 12 | 13 | 40 | 42 | −2 | 38 | |
| 10 | Olympiacos Liosia | 38 | 13 | 12 | 13 | 45 | 49 | −4 | 38 | |
| 11 | Chania | 38 | 13 | 10 | 15 | 44 | 47 | −3 | 36 | |
| 12 | Fostiras | 38 | 12 | 11 | 15 | 52 | 43 | +9 | 35 | |
| 13 | Irodotos | 38 | 12 | 11 | 15 | 49 | 51 | −2 | 35 | |
| 14 | Atromitos Piraeus | 38 | 14 | 7 | 17 | 47 | 56 | −9 | 35 | |
| 15 | AFC Patra | 38 | 13 | 8 | 17 | 57 | 55 | +2 | 34 | |
| 16 | Levadiakos | 38 | 12 | 10 | 16 | 43 | 47 | −4 | 34 | |
| 17 | Orfeas Egaleo (R) | 38 | 12 | 10 | 16 | 37 | 43 | −6 | 34 | Relegation to C National Amateur Division |
| 18 | Paniliakos (R) | 38 | 6 | 9 | 23 | 33 | 80 | −47 | 21 | Relegation to C National Amateur Division |
| 19 | Kalamata (R) | 38 | 5 | 11 | 22 | 21 | 75 | −54 | 21 | Relegation to C National Amateur Division |
| 20 | Koropi (R) | 38 | 7 | 8 | 23 | 34 | 76 | −42 | 17 (Note: Koropi had 5 points deducted.) | Relegation to C National Amateur Division |

(C) Champions; (P) Promoted; (R) Relegated

== North Group ==
=== League table ===
| Pos | Team | Pld | W | D | L | GF | GA | GD | Pts | Promotion or relegation |
|---|---|---|---|---|---|---|---|---|---|---|
| 1 | Veria (C, P) | 38 | 23 | 10 | 5 | 57 | 19 | +38 | 56 (Note: ?Veria maybe had 3 points deducted?) | Promotion to Alpha Ethniki |
| 2 | Doxa Drama | 38 | 22 | 9 | 7 | 68 | 28 | +40 | 53 | |
| 3 | AEL | 38 | 19 | 8 | 11 | 63 | 40 | +23 | 46 | |
| 4 | Anagennisi Epanomi | 38 | 16 | 11 | 11 | 34 | 29 | +5 | 43 | |
| 5 | Apollon Kalamarias | 38 | 14 | 14 | 10 | 40 | 36 | +4 | 42 | |
| 6 | Trikala | 38 | 18 | 6 | 14 | 46 | 43 | +3 | 42 | |
| 7 | Pandramaikos | 38 | 15 | 12 | 11 | 39 | 37 | +2 | 42 | |
| 8 | Olympiacos Volos | 38 | 16 | 8 | 14 | 49 | 38 | +11 | 40 | |
| 9 | Kilkisiakos | 38 | 16 | 6 | 16 | 47 | 55 | −8 | 38 | |
| 10 | Naoussa | 38 | 15 | 7 | 16 | 42 | 43 | −1 | 37 | |
| 11 | Niki Volos | 38 | 16 | 5 | 17 | 54 | 56 | −2 | 37 | |
| 12 | Panthrakikos | 38 | 14 | 8 | 16 | 39 | 56 | −17 | 36 | |
| 13 | Almopos Aridea | 38 | 13 | 9 | 16 | 51 | 52 | −1 | 35 | |
| 14 | Lamia | 38 | 15 | 5 | 18 | 37 | 48 | −11 | 35 | |
| 15 | Anagennisi Karditsa | 38 | 12 | 10 | 16 | 43 | 45 | −2 | 34 | |
| 16 | Xanthi | 38 | 12 | 10 | 16 | 33 | 36 | −3 | 34 | |
| 17 | Anagennisi Arta (R) | 38 | 14 | 6 | 18 | 30 | 40 | −10 | 34 | Relegation to C National Amateur Division |
| 18 | Kampaniakos (R) | 38 | 14 | 6 | 18 | 39 | 51 | −12 | 34 | Relegation to C National Amateur Division |
| 19 | Ethnikos Sidirokastro (R) | 38 | 7 | 10 | 21 | 32 | 62 | −30 | 24 | Relegation to C National Amateur Division |
| 20 | Kozani (R) | 38 | 7 | 4 | 27 | 33 | 62 | −29 | 2 (Note: Kozani had 16 points deducted.) | Relegation to C National Amateur Division |

(C) Champions; (P) Promoted; (R) Relegated
