= 1990–91 Beta Ethniki =

Beta Ethniki
- Season: 1990–91
- Dates: 16 September 1990 – 28 April 1991
- Champions: Ethnikos Piraeus
- Promoted: Ethnikos Piraeus; Korinthos; Pierikos
- Relegated: Eordaikos; Proodeftiki; Makedonikos; Veria

Beta Ethniki 1990–91 complete season.

== League table ==
Location of teams in 1990–91 Beta Ethniki

Pos	Team	Pld	W	D	L	GF	GA	GD	Pts	Promotion or relegation
1	Ethnikos Piraeus (C, P)	34	17	12	5	45	22	+23	46	Promotion to Alpha Ethniki
2	Korinthos (P)	34	16	10	8	44	21	+23	42	Promotion to Alpha Ethniki
3	Pierikos (P)	34	15	10	9	52	31	+21	40	Promotion to Alpha Ethniki
4	Apollon Kalamarias	34	16	7	11	56	48	+8	39	
5	Anagennisi Giannitsa	34	13	9	12	25	27	−2	35	
6	Rethymniakos	34	12	10	12	38	37	+1	34	
7	Edessaikos	34	12	8	14	34	34	0	32	
8	Charavgiakos	34	11	10	13	30	33	−3	32	
9	Panargiakos	34	10	12	12	36	36	0	32	
10	Kastoria	34	11	10	13	40	45	−5	32	
11	Olympiacos Volos	34	11	10	13	34	40	−6	32	
12	Kavala	34	10	12	12	35	46	−11	32	
13	Atromitos	34	12	6	16	39	39	0	30	
14	Diagoras (Note: Diagoras had 6 points deducted.)	34	14	8	12	32	30	+2	30	
15	Eordaikos (R)	34	12	6	16	33	43	−10	30	Relegation to Gamma Ethniki
16	Proodeftiki (R)	34	10	10	14	28	47	−19	30	Relegation to Gamma Ethniki
17	Makedonikos (R)	34	11	7	16	33	51	−18	29	Relegation to Gamma Ethniki
18	Veria (R)	34	10	9	15	38	42	−4	29	Relegation to Gamma Ethniki

(C) Champions; (P) Promoted; (R) Relegated

== Results ==
Home \ Away	ANG	APL	ATR	CHV	DIA	EDE	EOR	ETH	KAS	KAV	KOR	MAK	EOV	PRG	PIE	PRO	RTY	VER
Anagennisi Giannitsa		1–0	1–0	2–0	1–0	0–0	2–0	0–0	1–1	1–1	2–1	2–1	1–0	0–1	2–1	2–0	1–0	2–0
Apollon Kalamarias	2–0		3–2	2–1	1–1	3–2	2–0	2–1	3–2	3–1	0–0	2–1	3–2	2–0	1–1	3–2	2–1	3–0
Atromitos	1–1	1–1		2–0	2–1	1–0	1–0	0–1	4–1	2–2	0–1	1–2	1–0	1–1	0–2	4–0	3–1	1–0
Charavgiakos	2–0	3–1	2–0		2–0	0–0	2–0	0–0	2–1	1–0	1–1	2–1	1–0	5–2	0–0	1–1	1–0	0–0
Diagoras	1–0	3–0	2–1	1–0		1–0	2–0	3–0	2–0	1–2	2–1	1–0	2–0	1–0	0–0	1–0	2–0	2–2
Edessaikos	0–0	0–3	0–0	3–0	1–0		0–0	1–2	3–0	2–1	1–0	1–0	1–0	2–1	5–2	4–0	0–0	2–1
Eordaikos	2–0	2–1	2–1	1–0	2–0	1–0		1–2	0–1	1–1	1–0	2–1	0–2	1–0	2–1	4–1	1–1	2–1
Ethnikos Piraeus	0–0	2–0	2–0	2–0	4–1	2–0	1–0		2–1	1–0	2–1	5–1	3–0	3–1	0–0	2–0	2–0	0–0
Kastoria	2–1	3–2	4–1	0–0	2–0	2–0	3–0	0–0		2–1	1–0	4–1	1–1	1–0	1–1	1–1	1–1	0–0
Kavala	1–0	2–1	0–2	0–0	3–0	1–0	2–1	0–0	2–1		1–1	1–1	3–3	3–1	0–0	1–0	0–1	2–0
Korinthos	0–0	3–1	1–0	1–0	2–0	4–0	3–2	1–0	2–0	0–0		3–0	6–0	0–0	2–1	2–0	2–0	2–0
Makedonikos	0–0	1–4	0–2	1–0	1–1	1–0	1–1	2–1	2–2	1–1	2–0		0–2	2–0	1–0	1–0	3–2	2–1
Olympiacos Volos	2–0	0–0	2–1	1–1	0–0	0–2	0–0	0–0	0–0	1–0	1–1	3–1		2–1	0–1	0–0	4–3	1–2
Panargiakos	4–1	2–2	1–0	2–0	0–0	1–1	2–1	2–0	1–0	3–0	1–1	0–0	1–0		0–0	3–0	2–2	1–1
Pierikos	0–1	1–0	3–1	3–0	2–1	2–2	4–1	1–1	3–0	8–0	2–1	2–0	1–2	1–1		3–0	1–0	3–2
Proodeftiki	1–0	2–1	1–1	1–1	0–0	3–1	2–0	2–2	1–0	2–1	0–0	3–1	2–1	1–0	1–0		0–0	1–1
Rethymniakos	2–0	1–1	1–0	2–1	1–0	1–0	1–1	0–0	3–1	4–1	0–0	2–0	1–3	0–0	2–0	2–0		2–0
Veria	1–0	4–1	0–2	2–1	0–0	1–0	2–1	2–2	4–1	1–1	0–1	0–1	0–1	2–1	1–2	3–0	4–1	

Legend: Blue = home team win; Yellow = draw; Red = away team win.

== Top scorers ==
Rank	Player	Club	Goals
1	(Greece) Alexis Alexandris	Veria	16
1	(Greece) Nikos Tsoleridis	Apollon Kalamarias	16
3	(Greece) Andreas Konstantinidis	Atromitos	15
4	(Greece) Charis Sofianos	Ethnikos Piraeus	14
6	(Greece) Thomas Vainas	Pierikos	12
6	(Greece) Bambas	Ethnikos Piraeus	12
