= 1965–66 Beta Ethniki =

Beta Ethniki
- Season: 1965–66
- Dates: 21 November 1965 – 19 June 1966
- Champions: OFI (Group 1); Vyzas Megara (Group 2); Veria (Group 3)
- Promoted: Vyzas Megara; Veria
- Relegated: None

Beta Ethniki 1965–66 complete season.

== Group 1 ==
=== League table ===
Pos	Team	Pld	W	D	L	GF	GA	GD	Pts	Qualification
1	OFI (C)	30	17	10	3	50	28	+22	74	Qualification for Promotion play-offs
2	Fostiras	30	17	6	7	59	34	+25	70	
3	Panetolikos	30	14	9	7	42	25	+17	67	
4	Apollon Kalamata	30	17	2	11	46	33	+13	66	
5	Ethnikos Asteras	30	13	8	9	47	36	+11	64	
6	Atromitos	30	15	4	11	43	38	+5	64	
7	AE Chalandri	31	13	7	11	58	41	+17	63 (Note: AE Chalandri, PAO Kalogreza and Averof Ioannina had 1 point deducted.)	
8	Panachaiki	30	11	10	9	47	35	+12	62	
9	PAO Kalogreza	30	12	6	12	56	38	+18	59	
10	Thyella Patras	30	12	5	13	47	51	−4	59	
11	AO Ioannina	30	13	3	14	38	44	−6	59	
12	Panargiakos	30	10	8	12	37	43	−6	58	
13	Olympiakos Patras	30	8	11	11	39	45	−6	57	
14	Averof Ioannina	30	7	10	13	24	42	−18	53	
15	Chania	30	8	5	17	44	70	−26	51	
16	Panarkadikos	30	0	2	28	14	88	−74	23 (Note: Panarkadikos had 9 points deducted.)	

(C) Champions

== Group 2 ==
=== League table ===
Pos	Team	Pld	W	D	L	GF	GA	GD	Pts	Qualification
1	Vyzas Megara (C, P)	30	19	6	5	69	28	+41	74	Qualification for Promotion play-offs
2	Diagoras	30	18	4	8	49	24	+25	70	
3	Panelefsiniakos	30	15	9	6	42	24	+18	69	
4	AEL	30	15	9	6	39	30	+9	69	
5	Ionikos	30	13	10	7	43	32	+11	65 (Note: Ionikos, Argonaftis Piraeus and Korinthos 1 point deducted.)	
6	Evripos Chalkida	30	15	5	10	58	45	+13	65	
7	Olympiacos Chalkida	30	14	6	10	46	33	+13	64	
8	Atromitos Piraeus	30	9	13	8	45	39	+6	61	
9	Aias Salamina	30	11	9	10	43	49	−6	61	
10	Argonaftis Piraeus	30	13	5	12	40	39	+1	60	
11	AE Mytilenes	30	12	5	13	40	36	+4	59	
12	Lamia	30	12	4	14	49	45	+4	58	
13	AE Tyrnavos	30	9	8	13	29	38	−9	56	
14	Korinthos	30	5	9	16	28	50	−22	48	
15	Orchomenos	30	3	4	23	25	80	−55	40	
16	Dorieas	30	3	2	25	26	79	−53	38	

(C) Champions; (P) Promoted

== Group 3 ==
=== League table ===
Pos	Team	Pld	W	D	L	GF	GA	GD	Pts	Qualification
1	Veria (C, P)	30	18	7	5	39	17	+22	73	Qualification for Promotion play-offs
2	Apollon Kalamarias	30	14	11	5	47	23	+24	69	
3	Kastoria	30	15	7	8	37	27	+10	67	
4	Doxa Drama	30	13	10	7	33	27	+6	65 (Note: Doxa Drama had 1 point deducted.)	
5	Olympiacos Volos	30	14	6	10	48	34	+14	64	
6	Edessaikos	30	9	16	5	33	24	+9	64	
7	Olympiakos Kozani	30	10	13	7	38	25	+13	63	
8	Filippoi Kavala	30	12	9	9	44	35	+9	63	
9	Aspida Xanthi	30	12	7	11	45	44	+1	61	
10	Aris Ptolemaida	30	9	11	10	37	33	+4	59	
11	Anagennisi Giannitsa	30	11	7	12	37	38	−1	59	
12	Nikiforos Florina	30	9	6	15	26	35	−9	54	
13	Kilkisiakos	30	9	5	16	31	50	−19	53	
14	Makedonikos	30	7	6	17	34	58	−24	50	
15	MENT Toumba	30	5	9	16	30	52	−22	49	
16	Anagennisi Karditsa	30	4	8	18	28	65	−37	46	

(C) Champions; (P) Promoted

== Promotion play-offs ==
Pos	Team	Pld	W	D	L	GF	GA	GD	Pts	Promotion	VYZ	VER	OFI
1	Vyzas Megara (P)	4	3	1	0	11	4	+7	11	Promotion to Alpha Ethniki		4–0	2–0
2	Veria (P)	4	2	0	2	5	7	−2	8	Promotion to Alpha Ethniki	2–3		2–0
3	OFI	4	0	1	3	2	7	−5	5		2–2	0–1	

Legend: Blue = home team win; Yellow = draw; Red = away team win.
(P) Promoted
