= 1979–80 Beta Ethniki =

Beta Ethniki
- Season: 1979–80
- Dates: 9 September 1979 – 8 June 1980
- Champions: Atromitos (South); Panserraikos (North)
- Promoted: Atromitos; Panserraikos
- Relegated: Chania; Lamia; Levadiakos; AO Petralona; Kozani; Kilkisiakos; Anagennisi Karditsa; Makedonikos Siatista

Beta Ethniki 1979–80 complete season.

== South Group ==
=== League table ===
Pos	Team	Pld	W	D	L	GF	GA	GD	Pts	Promotion or relegation
1	Atromitos (C, P)	38	22	5	11	59	27	+32	48 (Note: Atromitos had 1 point deducted.)	Promotion to Alpha Ethniki
2	Vyzas	38	17	8	13	51	44	+7	42	
3	Fostiras	38	17	8	13	46	41	+5	34 (Note: Fostiras, Panetolikos, Kallithea, Proodeftiki, Olympiakos Loutraki, Egaleo, AO Patra, Panelefsiniakos, Ethnikos Asteras, Irodotos, Panegialios, Ilisiakos, Chania and Lamia had 6 points deducted.)	
4	Panarkadikos	38	16	7	15	43	44	−1	33 (Note: Panarkadikos had 6 points deducted.)	
5	Panetolikos	38	17	5	16	56	38	+18	31	
6	Kallithea	38	15	8	15	46	35	+11	30	
7	Proodeftiki	38	17	4	17	44	40	+4	30	
8	Acharnaikos	38	14	9	15	44	33	+11	28 (Note: Acharnaikos had 9 points deducted.)	
9	Olympiakos Loutraki	38	13	10	15	35	32	+3	28	
10	Egaleo	38	13	9	16	48	42	+6	27	
11	AO Patra	38	9	16	13	31	32	−1	26	
12	Panelefsiniakos	38	12	10	16	48	52	−4	26	
13	Ethnikos Asteras	38	14	6	18	36	44	−8	26	
14	Irodotos	38	12	9	17	46	39	+7	25	
15	Panegialios	38	14	5	19	46	45	+1	25	
16	Ilisiakos	38	10	12	16	39	50	−11	24	
17	Chania (R)	38	12	7	19	35	44	−9	23	Relegation to C National Amateur Division
18	Lamia (R)	38	13	5	20	42	57	−15	23	Relegation to C National Amateur Division
19	Levadiakos (R)	38	9	7	22	39	57	−18	14 (Note: Levadiakos had 11 points deducted.)	Relegation to C National Amateur Division
20	AO Petralona (R)	38	6	6	26	28	66	−38	8 (Note: AO Petralona had 10 points deducted.)	Relegation to C National Amateur Division

(C) Champions; (P) Promoted; (R) Relegated

== North Group ==
=== League table ===
Pos	Team	Pld	W	D	L	GF	GA	GD	Pts	Promotion or relegation
1	Panserraikos (C, P)	38	23	8	7	78	26	+52	52 (Note: Panserraikos, Niki Volos, Olympiacos Volos, Pandramaikos, Anagennisi Epanomi, Panthrakikos and Agrotikos Asteras had 2 points deducted.)	Promotion to Alpha Ethniki
2	Niki Volos	38	15	12	11	42	37	+5	40	
3	Makedonikos	38	16	8	14	43	39	+4	37 (Note: Makedonikos had 3 points deducted.)	
4	Veria	38	17	6	15	55	36	+19	36 (Note: Veria and Xanthi had 4 points deducted.)	
5	Trikala	38	15	11	12	45	23	+22	35 (Note: Trikala, Naoussa, Anagennisi Giannitsa, Edessaikos, Eordaikos, Almopos Aridea, Kozani, Kilkisiakos, Anagennisi Karditsa and Makedonikos Siatista had 6 points deducted.)	
6	Olympiacos Volos	38	13	10	15	53	41	+12	34	
7	Naoussa	38	14	11	13	43	35	+8	33	
8	Pandramaikos	38	11	13	14	31	38	−7	33	
9	Anagennisi Epanomi	38	13	8	17	32	41	−9	32	
10	Anagennisi Giannitsa	38	16	5	17	39	39	0	31	
11	Panthrakikos	38	11	11	16	34	39	−5	31	
12	Edessaikos	38	14	8	16	42	41	+1	30	
13	Eordaikos	38	13	10	15	41	43	−2	30	
14	Agrotikos Asteras	38	11	10	17	38	48	−10	30	
15	Xanthi	38	15	4	19	31	49	−18	30	
16	Almopos Aridea	38	14	7	17	36	40	−4	29	
17	Kozani (R)	38	13	9	16	35	39	−4	29	Relegation to C National Amateur Division
18	Kilkisiakos (R)	38	13	8	17	40	43	−3	28	Relegation to C National Amateur Division
19	Anagennisi Karditsa (R)	38	15	4	19	33	41	−8	28	Relegation to C National Amateur Division
20	Makedonikos Siatista (R)	38	8	2	28	27	69	−42	12	Relegation to C National Amateur Division

(C) Champions; (P) Promoted; (R) Relegated

=== Relegation play-off ===
Team 1	Score	Team 2
Almopos Aridea	5–3	Kozani
