= 1983–84 Beta Ethniki =

Beta Ethniki
- Season: 1983–84
- Dates: 4 September 1983 – 10 June 1984
- Champions: Panachaiki
- Promoted: Panachaiki; Pierikos
- Relegated: Panetolikos; Olympiacos Volos; Niki Volos; Chalkida

Beta Ethniki 1983–84 complete season.

== League table ==
Location of teams in 1983–84 Beta Ethniki

| Pos | Team | Pld | W | D | L | GF | GA | GD | Pts | Promotion or relegation |
|---|---|---|---|---|---|---|---|---|---|---|
| 1 | Panachaiki (C, P) | 38 | 18 | 13 | 7 | 61 | 36 | +25 | 49 | Promotion to Alpha Ethniki |
| 2 | Pierikos (P) | 38 | 22 | 5 | 11 | 71 | 49 | +22 | 49 | Promotion to Alpha Ethniki |
| 3 | Agrotikos Asteras | 38 | 17 | 10 | 11 | 51 | 38 | +13 | 44 | |
| 4 | Xanthi | 38 | 18 | 6 | 14 | 37 | 37 | 0 | 42 | |
| 5 | Levadiakos | 38 | 18 | 4 | 16 | 55 | 48 | +7 | 40 | |
| 6 | Rodos | 38 | 15 | 8 | 15 | 67 | 58 | +9 | 38 | |
| 7 | Edessaikos | 38 | 16 | 6 | 16 | 57 | 56 | +1 | 38 | |
| 8 | Kavala (Note: Kavala had 10 points deducted.) | 38 | 19 | 9 | 10 | 43 | 31 | +12 | 37 | |
| 9 | Korinthos | 38 | 13 | 11 | 14 | 46 | 44 | +2 | 37 | |
| 10 | Diagoras | 38 | 13 | 11 | 14 | 36 | 34 | +2 | 37 | |
| 11 | Kastoria | 38 | 14 | 9 | 15 | 42 | 43 | −1 | 37 | |
| 12 | Atromitos | 38 | 13 | 11 | 14 | 40 | 43 | −3 | 37 | |
| 13 | Veria | 38 | 14 | 8 | 16 | 49 | 53 | −4 | 36 | |
| 14 | Makedonikos | 38 | 13 | 10 | 15 | 38 | 43 | −5 | 36 | |
| 15 | Proodeftiki | 38 | 13 | 10 | 15 | 41 | 47 | −6 | 36 | |
| 16 | Acharnaikos | 38 | 14 | 8 | 16 | 35 | 46 | −11 | 36 | |
| 17 | Panetolikos (R) | 38 | 13 | 9 | 16 | 39 | 40 | −1 | 35 | Relegation to Gamma Ethniki |
| 18 | Olympiacos Volos (R) | 38 | 10 | 14 | 14 | 41 | 39 | +2 | 34 | Relegation to Gamma Ethniki |
| 19 | Niki Volos (R) | 38 | 11 | 8 | 19 | 39 | 61 | −22 | 30 | Relegation to Gamma Ethniki |
| 20 | Chalkida (R) | 38 | 7 | 8 | 23 | 26 | 67 | −41 | 22 | Relegation to Gamma Ethniki |

(C) Champions; (P) Promoted; (R) Relegated

== Results ==
| Home \ Away | ACH | AGR | ATR | CHA | DIA | EDE | KAS | KAV | KOR | LEV | MAK | NVL | EOV | PCK | PNT | PIE | PRO | ROD | VER | XAN |
|---|---|---|---|---|---|---|---|---|---|---|---|---|---|---|---|---|---|---|---|---|
| Acharnaikos | | 1–0 | 0–0 | 0–1 | 1–0 | 2–0 | 1–0 | 0–0 | 1–1 | 2–0 | 1–0 | 3–0 | 2–1 | 1–0 | 1–0 | 3–2 | 0–0 | 0–1 | 2–0 | 1–0 |
| Agrotikos Asteras | 3–0 | | 1–0 | 2–0 | 4–0 | 3–1 | 3–2 | 3–2 | 2–0 | 1–0 | 1–1 | 1–0 | 0–0 | 0–0 | 3–1 | 4–1 | 4–2 | 2–1 | 2–1 | 0–0 |
| Atromitos | 1–0 | 0–0 | | 2–0 | 1–0 | 1–3 | 0–0 | 1–0 | 4–1 | 1–0 | 1–2 | 2–0 | 2–1 | 0–0 | 0–0 | 1–1 | 4–1 | 4–1 | 0–0 | 1–0 |
| Chalkida | 3–1 | 1–1 | 1–0 | | 0–0 | 1–2 | 0–0 | 1–1 | 1–0 | 1–3 | 1–1 | 1–2 | 3–1 | 0–1 | 2–1 | 1–5 | 0–2 | 2–2 | 1–0 | 2–3 |
| Diagoras Rodos | 4–0 | 3–1 | 1–0 | 4–0 | | 2–0 | 1–1 | 0–1 | 2–0 | 1–1 | 3–0 | 2–1 | 1–0 | 1–1 | 1–0 | 3–1 | 1–0 | 0–0 | 1–0 | 0–1 |
| Edessaikos | 1–0 | 1–1 | 1–1 | 4–0 | 4–0 | | 1–1 | 2–0 | 1–1 | 2–3 | 2–1 | 3–0 | 1–1 | 1–1 | 1–0 | 3–0 | 1–0 | 3–0 | 3–1 | 1–0 |
| Kastoria | 2–2 | 1–0 | 0–1 | 2–0 | 0–0 | 2–1 | | 2–0 | 2–1 | 1–0 | 3–0 | 1–1 | 2–1 | 1–1 | 5–1 | 2–1 | 3–1 | 2–1 | 2–1 | 1–0 |
| Kavala | 0–0 | 1–0 | 2–0 | 4–0 | 1–1 | 3–0 | 3–0 | | 2–0 | 2–1 | 1–0 | 2–1 | 2–0 | 2–1 | 0–0 | 3–1 | 2–1 | 3–0 | 1–0 | 1–0 |
| Korinthos | 6–0 | 1–1 | 2–2 | 2–0 | 0–0 | 2–1 | 2–1 | 2–0 | | 1–0 | 1–0 | 2–1 | 0–0 | 0–0 | 2–0 | 2–3 | 1–1 | 1–0 | 1–0 | 5–0 |
| Levadiakos | 3–1 | 0–1 | 2–1 | 1–0 | 2–1 | 5–1 | 2–1 | 4–0 | 0–0 | | 3–0 | 4–2 | 2–1 | 2–2 | 0–1 | 4–3 | 3–1 | 1–0 | 2–1 | 2–0 |
| Makedonikos | 2–1 | 1–1 | 4–1 | 1–0 | 1–1 | 2–1 | 1–0 | 0–0 | 2–1 | 0–1 | | 2–1 | 2–1 | 1–2 | 1–0 | 1–2 | 0–0 | 3–1 | 1–1 | 0–1 |
| Niki Volos | 2–4 | 0–3 | 3–1 | 1–1 | 1–0 | 2–0 | 1–0 | 0–0 | 2–0 | 3–1 | 2–1 | | 0–0 | 1–1 | 1–0 | 1–1 | 1–0 | 2–2 | 2–4 | 2–0 |
| Olympiacos Volos | 1–0 | 1–0 | 1–2 | 4–0 | 0–0 | 2–1 | 4–1 | 1–1 | 2–0 | 1–0 | 1–2 | 2–0 | | 1–1 | 2–2 | 2–2 | 4–0 | 2–1 | 1–1 | 1–2 |
| Panachaiki | 1–0 | 3–0 | 2–2 | 2–0 | 2–0 | 5–2 | 4–1 | 3–0 | 3–3 | 2–0 | 1–1 | 2–1 | 0–0 | | 2–1 | 1–0 | 2–0 | 4–0 | 3–0 | 4–2 |
| Panetolikos | 1–0 | 2–2 | 1–0 | 4–1 | 1–0 | 0–1 | 2–0 | 1–2 | 2–1 | 4–1 | 0–0 | 1–0 | 2–1 | 2–0 | | 2–1 | 0–0 | 5–1 | 1–1 | 0–1 |
| Pierikos | 1–1 | 2–0 | 2–0 | 1–0 | 2–1 | 2–0 | 1–0 | 2–0 | 2–1 | 1–0 | 2–1 | 5–0 | 0–0 | 1–0 | 2–0 | | 4–1 | 3–1 | 3–2 | 4–0 |
| Proodeftiki | 2–1 | 2–1 | 4–0 | 1–0 | 1–0 | 2–3 | 1–0 | 0–1 | 0–1 | 2–2 | 1–0 | 0–0 | 0–0 | 2–1 | 1–1 | 2–0 | | 3–1 | 3–1 | 2–0 |
| Rodos | 3–1 | 4–0 | 1–1 | 4–0 | 1–1 | 5–2 | 0–0 | 2–0 | 1–1 | 3–0 | 3–2 | 4–1 | 2–0 | 4–0 | 1–0 | 2–3 | 2–0 | | 6–2 | 2–2 |
| Veria | 1–1 | 1–0 | 3–2 | 1–1 | 1–0 | 2–1 | 2–0 | 1–0 | 3–1 | 1–0 | 0–0 | 4–1 | 2–0 | 2–1 | 2–0 | 2–3 | 2–2 | 1–3 | | 1–0 |
| Xanthi | 3–0 | 1–0 | 2–0 | 1–0 | 3–0 | 2–1 | 1–0 | 0–0 | 2–0 | 2–0 | 0–1 | 1–0 | 0–0 | 1–2 | 0–0 | 2–1 | 0–0 | 2–1 | 2–1 | |

Legend: Blue = home team win; Yellow = draw; Red = away team win.

== Play-offs ==
1st place play-off
| Team 1 | Score | Team 2 |
|---|---|---|
| Panachaiki | 2–0 | Pierikos |

== Top scorers ==
| Rank | Player | Club | Goals |
|---|---|---|---|
| 1 | (Greece) Dimitris Tzeplidis | Edessaikos | 21 |
| 2 | (Greece) Andreas Anagnostou | Pierikos | 16 |
| 3 | (Greece) Christos Mesimerlis | Edessaikos | 15 |
| 4 | (Greece) Apostolis Drakopoulos | Panachaiki | 14 |
| 4 | (Greece) Apostolos Mitrakos | Atromitos | 14 |
