= 1981–82 Beta Ethniki =

Beta Ethniki
- Season: 1981–82
- Dates: 13 September 1981 – 4 July 1982
- Champions: Panachaiki (South); Makedonikos (North)
- Promoted: Panachaiki; Makedonikos
- Relegated: Panargiakos; Ilisiakos; Kallithea; Olympiakos Loutraki; Almopos Aridea; Anagennisi Karditsa; Anagennisi Epanomi; Toxotis Volos

Beta Ethniki 1981–82 complete season.

== South Group ==
=== League table ===
Pos	Team	Pld	W	D	L	GF	GA	GD	Pts	Promotion or relegation
1	Panachaiki (C, P)	38	20	10	8	53	25	+28	50	Promotion to Alpha Ethniki
2	Acharnaikos	38	21	7	10	61	33	+28	49	
3	Vyzas	38	18	10	10	52	42	+10	46	
4	Panelefsiniakos	38	16	13	9	56	39	+17	45	
5	Chalkida	38	16	12	10	58	45	+13	44	
6	Egaleo	38	18	6	14	65	49	+16	42	
7	Diagoras Rodos	38	15	11	12	46	33	+13	41	
8	Proodeftiki	38	14	13	11	46	36	+10	41	
9	Panetolikos	38	15	11	12	44	36	+8	41	
10	Ethnikos Asteras	38	14	10	14	42	50	−8	38	
11	Atromitos	38	11	15	12	41	46	−5	37	
12	Panegialios	38	14	9	15	46	57	−11	37	
13	Fostiras	38	13	10	15	49	53	−4	36	
14	Atromitos Piraeus	38	14	8	16	45	51	−6	36	
15	Irodotos	38	13	9	16	49	49	0	35	
16	Chania	38	15	5	18	48	60	−12	35	
17	Panargiakos (R)	38	10	14	14	30	37	−7	34	Relegation to C National Amateur Division
18	Ilisiakos (R)	38	10	11	17	44	52	−8	31	Relegation to C National Amateur Division
19	Kallithea (R)	38	9	11	18	34	56	−22	26 (Note: ?3 points deducted?)	Relegation to C National Amateur Division
20	Olympiakos Loutraki (R)	38	3	7	28	34	94	−60	11 (Note: ?2 points deducted?)	Relegation to C National Amateur Division

(C) Champions; (P) Promoted; (R) Relegated

== North Group ==
=== League table ===
Pos	Team	Pld	W	D	L	GF	GA	GD	Pts	Promotion or relegation
1	Makedonikos (C, P)	38	20	12	6	67	29	+38	52	Promotion to Alpha Ethniki
2	Olympiacos Volos	38	22	5	11	67	34	+33	49	
3	Agrotikos Asteras	38	15	11	12	43	38	+5	41	
4	Pierikos	38	13	15	10	44	41	+3	41	
5	Veria	38	18	4	16	65	46	+19	40	
6	Eordaikos	38	13	14	11	39	44	−5	40	
7	Apollon Kalamarias	38	13	13	12	37	39	−2	39	
8	Panthrakikos	38	15	9	14	38	48	−10	39	
9	Niki Volos	38	16	6	16	55	43	+12	38	
10	Trikala	38	14	10	14	56	47	+9	38	
11	Xanthi	38	12	13	13	34	32	+2	37	
12	Kilkisiakos	38	14	9	15	42	43	−1	37	
13	Anagennisi Giannitsa	38	12	13	13	43	47	−4	37	
14	Kozani	38	13	11	14	39	48	−9	37	
15	Naoussa	38	16	5	17	32	46	−14	37	
16	Achaiki	38	15	6	17	50	52	−2	36	
17	Almopos Aridea (R)	38	14	8	16	39	38	+1	36	Relegation to C National Amateur Division
18	Anagennisi Karditsa (R)	38	13	8	17	36	53	−17	34	Relegation to C National Amateur Division
19	Anagennisi Epanomi (R)	38	10	7	21	29	56	−27	27	Relegation to C National Amateur Division
20	Toxotis Volos (R)	38	7	11	20	38	69	−31	25	Relegation to C National Amateur Division

(C) Champions; (P) Promoted; (R) Relegated

=== Relegation play-off ===
Team 1	Score	Team 2
Achaiki	1–0	Almopos Aridea
