= P.A.S. Korinthos =

Football club in Corinth, Greece

P.A.S Korinthos
- Full name: Pagkorinthiakos Athlitikos Syllogos Korinthos; Παγκορινθιακός Αθλητικός Σύλλογος Κόρινθος
- Nickname: Barça (Μπάρτσα)
- Founded: 1963; 63 years ago
- Ground: Korinthos Stadium
- Capacity: 8,000
- Chairman: Georgios Mouroutsos
- Manager: Vacant
- League: Gamma Ethniki
- 2025–26: Gamma Ethniki (Group 4), 4th
Home colours	Away colours

Former crest

Pagkorinthiakos Athlitikos Syllogos Korinthos (Greek: Παγκορινθιακός Αθλητικός Σύλλογος Κόρινθος, lit. 'Pan-corinthian Athletic Club'), commonly known as P.A.S. Korinthos or simply Korinthos ([ˈkorinθos]), is a Greek football club based in the city of Corinth, Greece. Pagkorinthiakos can literally be translated as "Pan-corinthian", which means "of all Corinth (Korinthos in English literature)".

== History ==
The history of the club began in 1957 when Pagkorinthiakos was formed after the amalgamation of the two teams of Corinth—Olympiakos Korinthos and A.E. Korinthos. In 1963 the club merged with Aris Korinthos to form A.P.S Korinthos. In 1999 Korinthos merged with a re-established Pagkorinthiakos to form the current P.A.S. Korinthos.

== League history ==
=== Summary ===
- 5 seasons in Greek top level, First Division. Last one in 1992–93 season when it was Alpha Ethniki.
- 25 seasons in Second Division. Last one in 1994–95 season when it was Beta Ethniki.
- 15 seasons in Third Division. Last one in 2025–26 season.
- 8 seasons in Fourth Division. Last one in 2011–12 season.
- 11 seasons in Corinthia Football Clubs Association (E.P.S. Corinthia) Premier Division. Last one in 2022–23 season.

=== Season by Season ===
Season	Level	Division	Group	Position	Result
1963–64	3	Corinthia Football Clubs Association	Premier Division	1	Champion – promoted to 2nd division
1964–65	2	Beta Ethniki	2nd Group	2	as Korinthos S.C.*
1965–66	2	Beta Ethniki	2nd Group	14	
1966–67	2	Beta Ethniki	2nd Group	10	
1967–68	2	Beta Ethniki	South Group	14	
1968–69	2	Beta Ethniki	South Group	13	
1969–70	2	Beta Ethniki	First Group	2	
1970–71	2	Beta Ethniki	First Group	6	
1971–72	2	Beta Ethniki	First Group	7	
1972–73	2	Beta Ethniki	First Group	4	
1973–74	2	Beta Ethniki	First Group	2	3rd in promotion play-off, did not get promoted
1974–75	2	Beta Ethniki	First Group	7	
1975–76	2	Beta Ethniki	South Group	9	
1976–77	2	Beta Ethniki	South Group	2	
1977–78	2	Beta Ethniki	South Group	8	
1978–79	2	Beta Ethniki	South Group	1	Champion, promoted to 1st division
1979–80	1	Alpha Ethniki		10	
1980–81	1	Alpha Ethniki		16	
1981–82	1	Alpha Ethniki		18	relegated to 2nd division
1982–83	2	Beta Ethniki	South Group	5	
1983–84	2	Beta Ethniki		9	
1984–85	2	Beta Ethniki		19	relegated to 3rd division
1985–86	3	Gamma Ethniki	South Group	2	promoted to 2nd division
1986–87	2	Beta Ethniki		6	
1987–88	2	Beta Ethniki		6	
1988–89	2	Beta Ethniki		4	4th in promotion play-off, did not get promoted
1989–90	2	Beta Ethniki		8	
1990–91	2	Beta Ethniki		2	promoted to 1st division
1991–92	1	Alpha Ethniki		10	
1992–93	1	Alpha Ethniki		18	relegated to 2nd division
1993–94	2	Beta Ethniki		13	
1994–95	2	Beta Ethniki		18	relegated to 3rd division
1995–96	3	Gamma Ethniki	South Group	11	
1996–97	3	Gamma Ethniki	South Group	12	
1997–98	3	Gamma Ethniki	South Group	14	relegated to 4th division
1998–99	4	Delta Ethniki	Third Group	6	as P.A.S. Korinthos*
1999–00	4	Delta Ethniki	First Group	14	relegated to Corinthia Football Clubs Association 1st Division
2000–01	5	Corinthia Football Clubs Association	Premier Division	1	
2001–02	5	Corinthia Football Clubs Association	Premier Division	1	promoted to 4th division
2002–03	4	Delta Ethniki	Eighth Group	3	
2003–04	4	Delta Ethniki	Eighth Group	10	
2004–05	4	Delta Ethniki	Ninth Group	2	
2005–06	4	Delta Ethniki	Seventh Group	2	
2006–07	4	Delta Ethniki	Seventh Group	1	Champion – promoted to 3rd division
2007–08	3	Gamma Ethniki	South Group	4	
2008–09	3	Gamma Ethniki	South Group	5	
2009–10	3	Gamma Ethniki	South Group	9	
2010–11	3	Football League 2	South Group	6	relegated to 4th division due to irregularities during player transfers
2011–12	4	Delta Ethniki	Seventh Group	1	Champion – promoted to 3rd division
2012–13	3	Football League 2	South Group	11	
2013–14	3	Gamma Ethniki	Fourth Group	10	relegated to Corinthia Football Clubs Association 1st Division because Delta Ethniki was abolished in 2013
2014–15	4	Corinthia Football Clubs Association	Premier Division	12	
2015–16	4	Corinthia Football Clubs Association	Premier Division	9	
2016–17	4	Corinthia Football Clubs Association	Premier Division	3	
2017–18	4	Corinthia Football Clubs Association	Premier Division	1	Champion – promoted to 3rd division
2018–19	3	Gamma Ethniki	Seventh Group	11	relegated to Corinthia Football Clubs Association 1st Division
2019–20	5	Corinthia Football Clubs Association	Premier Division	8	
2020–21	5	Corinthia Football Clubs Association	Premier Division	-	The season was suspended due to COVID-19
2021–22	4	Corinthia Football Clubs Association	Premier Division	2	
2022–23	4	Corinthia Football Clubs Association	Premier Division	1	Champion – promoted to 3rd division
2023–24	3	Gamma Ethniki	Third Group	2	
2024–25	3	Gamma Ethniki	Third Group	2	
2025–26	3	Gamma Ethniki	Fourth Group	4	

== European record ==
Season	Competition	Round	Club	Home	Away
1993–94	Intertoto Cup	Group Stage (Group 2)	(Sweden) Trelleborg	0–3	
1993–94	Intertoto Cup	Group Stage (Group 2)	(Denmark) Lyngby		0–2
1993–94	Intertoto Cup	Group Stage (Group 2)	(Romania) Rapid Bucharest	2–8	
1993–94	Intertoto Cup	Group Stage (Group 2)	(Germany) Saarbrücken		0–3

== Titles and honours ==
- Second Division – Champion: 1
  - 1978–79
- Second Division – Runner Up: 5
  - 1964–65, 1969–70, 1973–74, 1976–77, 1990–91
- Third Division – Runner Up: 1
  - 1985–86
- Fourth Division – Champion: 2
  - 2006–07, 2011–12
- Fourth Division – Runner Up: 2
  - 2004–05, 2005–06
- Corinthia FCA First Division – Champion: 5
  - 1963–64, 2000–01, 2001–02, 2017–18, 2022–23
- Corinthia FCA Cup – Champion: 7
  - 2000–01, 2001–02, 2004–05, 2005–06, 2001–12, 2018–19, 2023–24

== Notable former staff ==
This section contains players and managers that have been part of the Greek "big-4" football clubs (Olympiacos, Panathinaikos, AEK Athens, PAOK) or members of their respective national teams.

=== Managers ===
- (Greece) Nikos Alefantos
- (Czech Republic) Petr Packert
- (Greece) Miltos Papapostolou

=== Players ===
- (Greece) Angelos Anastasiadis
- (Greece) Iakovos Chatziathanasiou
- (Greece) Thanasis Intzoglou
- (Greece) Makis Katsavakis
- (Greece) Nikos Kourbanas
- (Greece) Giannis Marditsis
- (Greece) Kostas Batsinilas
- (Romania) Dănuţ Lupu
- (Greece) Mihalis Mylonas
- (Poland) Mirosław Okoński
- (Greece) Giannis Pathiakakis
- (Greece) Hristos Petriniotis
- (Greece) Ioannis Stefas
- (Greece) Giorgos Togias
- (Greece) Dionysis Tsamis
