= 1998–99 Gamma Ethniki =

Gamma Ethniki
- Season: 1998–99
- Champions: Egaleo (South); Olympiacos Volos (North)
- Promoted: Egaleo; Panegialios; Olympiacos Volos; Naoussa
- Relegated: Levadiakos; Rethymniakos; Panargiakos; Achaiki; Aiolikos; Aetos Skydra; Preveza; Ampelokipi; Kastoria; Doxa Drama

The 1998–99 Gamma Ethniki was the 16th season since the official establishment of the third tier of Greek football in 1983. Egaleo and Olympiacos Volos were crowned champions in Southern and Northern Group respectively, thus winning promotion to Beta Ethniki. Panegialios and Naoussa also won promotion as a runners-up of the groups.

Levadiakos, Rethymniakos, Panargiakos, Achaiki, Aiolikos, Aetos Skydra, Preveza, Ampelokipi, Kastoria and Doxa Drama were relegated to Delta Ethniki.

== Southern Group ==
=== League table ===
Pos	Team	Pld	W	D	L	GF	GA	GD	Pts	Promotion or relegation
1	Egaleo (C, P)	22	14	2	6	33	22	+11	44	Promotion to Beta Ethniki
2	Panegialios (P)	22	13	3	6	39	25	+14	42	Promotion to Beta Ethniki
3	Agersani Naxos	22	11	4	7	26	26	0	37	
4	Marko	22	10	6	6	40	24	+16	36	
5	Keratsini	22	9	7	6	32	20	+12	34	
6	Nafpaktiakos Asteras	22	10	4	8	31	31	0	34	
7	Atromitos	22	9	6	7	28	26	+2	33	
8	Levadiakos (R)	22	8	9	5	29	25	+4	33	Relegation to Delta Ethniki
9	Rethymniakos (R)	22	9	4	9	39	28	+11	31	Relegation to Delta Ethniki
10	Panargiakos (R)	22	6	3	13	16	29	−13	21	Relegation to Delta Ethniki
11	Achaiki (R)	22	3	4	15	20	48	−28	13	Relegation to Delta Ethniki
12	Aiolikos (R)	22	2	4	16	12	41	−29	10	Relegation to Delta Ethniki

(C) Champions; (P) Promoted; (R) Relegated

=== Results ===
Home \ Away	ACH	AGR	AIO	ATR	EGA	KER	LEV	MAR	NAP	PRG	PNG	RTY
Achaiki		2–0	0–0	2–2	0–1	2–2	2–0	0–2	1–3	0–2	0–2	0–5
Agersani Naxos	2–1		2–1	2–0	2–0	1–0	1–1	0–0	0–1	1–0	2–1	4–2
Aiolikos	0–2	0–1		2–0	2–1	0–0	0–3	3–3	0–0	0–1	0–2	0–4
Atromitos	2–0	2–1	2–0		3–1	0–0	1–1	1–0	2–0	2–0	1–0	3–0
Egaleo	3–1	1–0	2–1	3–0		2–1	2–1	3–2	1–0	3–1	1–0	2–1
Keratsini	3–2	1–1	3–0	2–0	0–0		1–2	1–0	4–2	2–0	5–1	2–1
Levadiakos	4–1	2–0	1–0	1–1	2–1	1–1		1–3	1–1	1–0	2–3	2–0
Marko	1–1	5–0	5–1	1–1	3–2	1–2	3–1		3–0	1–0	2–1	1–1
Nafpaktiakos Asteras	2–0	2–3	2–0	3–1	2–1	2–0	0–0	2–2		1–0	2–3	2–1
Panargiakos	4–1	0–2	1–0	1–1	0–2	1–0	1–1	1–2	0–3		1–1	1–0
Panegialios	4–1	3–0	3–1	4–2	0–0	1–0	1–1	1–0	3–1	2–0		1–0
Rethymniakos	4–1	1–1	3–1	2–1	0–1	1–1	1–1	1–0	4–1	3–1	4–1	

Legend: Blue = home team win; Yellow = draw; Red = away team win.

=== Relegation play-off ===
Team 1	Score	Team 2
Atromitos	1–0 (a.e.t.)	Levadiakos

== Northern Group ==
=== League table ===
Pos	Team	Pld	W	D	L	GF	GA	GD	Pts	Promotion or relegation
1	Olympiacos Volos (C, P)	22	14	3	5	41	22	+19	45	Promotion to Beta Ethniki
2	Naoussa (P)	22	10	10	2	37	17	+20	40	Promotion to Beta Ethniki
3	Karditsa	22	11	5	6	34	27	+7	38	
4	Kozani	22	11	4	7	30	22	+8	37	
5	Kilkisiakos	22	10	6	6	26	21	+5	36	
6	Apollon Krya Vrysi	22	10	5	7	32	22	+10	35	
7	Poseidon Michaniona	22	10	4	8	22	15	+7	34	
8	Aetos Skydra (R)	22	7	11	4	19	16	+3	32	Relegation to Delta Ethniki
9	Preveza (R)	22	6	6	10	26	34	−8	24	Relegation to Delta Ethniki
10	Ampelokipi (R)	22	5	6	11	19	22	−3	21	Relegation to Delta Ethniki
11	Kastoria (Note: Kastoria had 2 points deducted.) (R)	21	3	3	15	20	48	−28	10	Relegation to Delta Ethniki
12	Doxa Drama (Note: Doxa Drama had 3 points deducted.) (R)	21	2	1	18	12	52	−40	4	Relegation to Delta Ethniki

(C) Champions; (P) Promoted; (R) Relegated

=== Results ===
Home \ Away	AET	AMP	AKV	DOX	KRD	KAS	KIL	KOZ	NAO	OLV	PNM	PRE
Aetos Skydra		1–0	1–1	2–0	2–1	5–1	0–0	0–0	0–0	0–0	1–0	1–1
Ampelokipi	0–0		1–2	3–0	1–2	2–0	0–1	0–3	4–4	0–1	2–0	0–0
Apollon Krya Vrysi	1–1	3–1		5–0	3–1	2–1	2–1	1–2	1–1	1–2	0–1	1–1
Doxa Drama	1–2	0–2	0–2		1–2	–	1–2	0–1	0–6	2–3	0–2	1–0
Karditsa	2–0	1–0	2–1	0–0		3–1	2–2	4–1	1–1	3–2	1–0	2–0
Kastoria	1–2	0–0	2–0	3–1	1–2		1–2	0–2	0–3	1–4	0–0	2–3
Kilkisiakos	0–0	1–1	1–2	3–1	2–0	2–3		0–0	1–0	1–0	1–0	4–1
Kozani	2–0	1–0	1–1	2–0	2–0	4–1	0–1		1–1	3–1	1–2	2–0
Naoussa	2–0	2–1	0–1	3–0	3–3	1–1	1–0	3–0		2–1	2–0	1–0
Olympiacos Volos	0–0	1–0	2–0	3–0	2–1	2–0	2–1	3–0	1–1		3–2	5–0
Poseidon Michaniona	0–0	0–0	0–1	2–0	3–1	3–0	2–0	1–0	0–0	1–2		1–0
Preveza	3–1	0–1	2–1	3–4	0–0	3–0	1–1	3–2	1–1	3–1	1–2	

Legend: Blue = home team win; Yellow = draw; Red = away team win.
