= 1985–86 Gamma Ethniki =

Gamma Ethniki
- Season: 1985–86
- Champions: Charavgiakos (South); Xanthi (North)
- Promoted: Charavgiakos; Korinthos; Xanthi; Olympiacos Volos
- Relegated: Neapolis; Agrinio; Ilioupolis; Poseidon Nea Michaniona; Odysseas Kordelio; Iraklis Kavala; Almopos Aridea

The 1985–86 Gamma Ethniki was the third season since the official establishment of the third tier of Greek football in 1983. Charavgiakos and Xanthi were crowned champions in Southern and Northern Group respectively, thus winning promotion to Beta Ethniki. Korinthos and Olympiacos Volos also won promotion as a runners-up of the groups.

Neapolis, Agrinio, Ilioupolis, Poseidon Nea Michaniona, Odysseas Kordelio, Iraklis Kavala and Almopos Aridea were relegated to Delta Ethniki.

== Southern Group ==
=== League table ===
Pos	Team	Pld	W	D	L	GF	GA	GD	Pts	Promotion or relegation
1	Charavgiakos (C, P)	38	22	7	9	47	21	+26	51	Promotion to Beta Ethniki
2	Korinthos (P)	38	19	12	7	66	28	+38	50	Promotion to Beta Ethniki
3	Kallithea (Note: Kallithea had 3 points deducted.)	38	21	9	8	72	33	+39	48	
4	Irodotos	38	20	7	11	44	30	+14	47	
5	Chalkida	38	16	9	13	57	45	+12	41	
6	Ergotelis	38	16	7	15	45	52	−7	39	
7	Ethnikos Asteras	38	15	8	15	33	40	−7	38	
8	Thriamvos	38	15	8	15	34	37	−3	38	
9	Pannafpliakos	38	15	8	15	49	49	0	38	
10	Kalamata	38	12	12	14	28	29	−1	36	
11	Kerkyra	38	15	6	17	31	47	−16	36	
12	Panarkadikos	38	14	8	16	47	55	−8	36	
13	Paniliakos	38	14	8	16	31	44	−13	36	
14	Rodos	38	14	8	16	48	49	−1	36	
15	Panelefsiniakos	38	14	7	17	47	48	−1	35	
16	Fostiras	38	14	6	18	34	38	−4	34	
17	Vyzas Megara (O)	38	13	8	17	48	43	+5	34	Qualification for relegation play-off
18	Neapolis (R)	38	11	9	18	31	52	−21	31	Relegation to Delta Ethniki
19	Agrinio (Note: Agrinio had 1 point deducted.) (R)	38	9	8	21	27	57	−30	25	Relegation to Delta Ethniki
20	Ilioupolis (Note: Ilioupolis had 14 points deducted.) (R)	38	10	7	21	32	52	−20	13	Relegation to Delta Ethniki

(C) Champions; (O) Play-off winners; (P) Promoted; (R) Relegated

== Northern Group ==
=== League table ===
Pos	Team	Pld	W	D	L	GF	GA	GD	Pts	Promotion or relegation
1	Xanthi (C, P)	38	23	6	9	72	30	+42	52	Promotion to Beta Ethniki
2	Olympiacos Volos (P)	39	22	8	9	80	39	+41	52	Promotion to Beta Ethniki
3	Niki Volos	38	19	10	9	65	34	+31	48	
4	Eordaikos	38	14	12	12	60	49	+11	40	
5	Ethnikos Alexandroupoli	38	16	8	14	58	51	+7	40	
6	Lamia	38	17	5	16	70	57	+13	39	
7	Langadas	38	11	17	10	49	62	−13	39	
8	Achilleas Farsala	38	16	7	15	51	56	−5	39	
9	Anagennisi Arta	38	16	6	16	59	57	+2	38	
10	Anagennisi Giannitsa	38	16	4	18	58	69	−11	36	
11	Kozani	38	13	10	15	54	37	+17	36	
12	Polykastro	38	12	12	14	41	50	−9	36	
13	Anagennisi Karditsa	38	14	8	16	50	64	−14	36	
14	Thiva	38	15	5	18	40	52	−12	35	
15	Panthrakikos	38	14	7	17	48	62	−14	35	
16	Alexandreia	38	14	7	17	41	48	−7	35	
17	Poseidon Nea Michaniona (R)	38	13	7	18	43	55	−12	33	Qualification for relegation play-off
18	Odysseas Kordelio (R)	38	12	9	17	46	63	−17	33	Relegation to Delta Ethniki
19	Iraklis Kavala (R)	38	13	5	20	36	59	−23	31	Relegation to Delta Ethniki
20	Almopos Aridea (R)	38	9	9	20	45	72	−27	27	Relegation to Delta Ethniki

(C) Champions; (P) Promoted; (R) Relegated

== Relegation play-off ==
Team 1	Score	Team 2
Vyzas Megara	2–0	Poseidon Nea Michaniona
