= 1986–87 Beta Ethniki =

Beta Ethniki
- Season: 1986–87
- Dates: 14 September 1986 – 21 June 1987
- Champions: Panachaiki
- Promoted: Panachaiki; Panserraikos; Levadiakos
- Relegated: Proodeftiki; Makedonikos; Panetolikos; Atromitos; Kilkisiakos; Egaleo

Beta Ethniki 1986–87 complete season.

== League table ==
Location of teams in 1986–87 Beta Ethniki

Pos	Team	Pld	W	D	L	GF	GA	GD	Pts	Promotion or relegation
1	Panachaiki (C, P)	38	22	5	11	71	39	+32	49	Promotion to Alpha Ethniki
2	Panserraikos (P)	38	19	8	11	57	29	+28	46	Promotion to Alpha Ethniki
3	Levadiakos (P)	38	21	4	13	49	33	+16	46	Promotion to Alpha Ethniki
4	Olympiacos Volos	38	16	10	12	45	35	+10	42	
5	Kastoria (Note: Kastoria and Charavgiakos had 2 points deducted.)	38	19	6	13	49	46	+3	42	
6	Korinthos	38	16	8	14	40	32	+8	40	
7	Ionikos (Note: Ionikos had 3 points deducted.)	38	17	9	12	49	46	+3	40	
8	Xanthi	38	14	11	13	46	35	+11	39	
9	Pierikos (Note: Pierikos, Kavala, Proodeftiki and Kilkisiakos had 1 point deducted.)	38	16	7	15	48	39	+9	38	
10	Charavgiakos	38	16	8	14	52	41	+11	38	
11	Trikala	38	14	10	14	33	41	−8	38	
12	Athinaikos	38	14	10	14	39	37	+2	38	
13	Acharnaikos	38	15	7	16	41	51	−10	37	
14	Kavala	38	13	11	14	31	35	−4	36	
15	Proodeftiki (R)	38	14	9	15	48	48	0	36	Relegation to Gamma Ethniki
16	Makedonikos (R)	38	12	12	14	43	50	−7	36	Relegation to Gamma Ethniki
17	Panetolikos (R)	38	13	10	15	39	56	−17	36	Relegation to Gamma Ethniki
18	Atromitos (R)	38	9	10	19	33	56	−23	28	Relegation to Gamma Ethniki
19	Kilkisiakos (R)	38	8	7	23	33	60	−27	22	Relegation to Gamma Ethniki
20	Egaleo (Note: Egaleo had 4 points deducted.) (R)	38	9	4	25	37	73	−36	18	Relegation to Gamma Ethniki

(C) Champions; (P) Promoted; (R) Relegated

== Results ==
Home \ Away	ACH	ATH	ATR	CHV	EGA	ION	KAS	KAV	KIL	KOR	LEV	MAK	EOV	PCK	PNT	PSE	PIE	PRO	TRI	XAN
Acharnaikos		0–2	3–2	2–0	5–3	0–0	2–1	1–0	2–1	2–1	1–1	1–0	1–1	0–0	2–1	0–0	0–1	0–0	3–0	2–1
Athinaikos	1–2		2–1	0–0	3–1	1–1	4–1	1–0	1–0	0–1	2–0	3–0	3–1	2–1	0–1	0–0	0–0	1–1	1–0	0–0
Atromitos	2–0	2–1		1–1	1–0	2–2	1–2	1–3	2–1	0–2	0–3	1–1	2–3	2–1	3–0	2–1	1–0	1–1	0–0	1–0
Charavgiakos	3–0	2–0	3–0		3–0	1–1	1–2	2–1	3–2	3–2	0–1	2–0	2–1	1–3	2–0	1–1	0–0	2–3	4–2	2–0
Egaleo	1–0	0–1	2–1	0–1		1–0	0–3	2–0	3–0	4–2	0–1	0–1	0–0	1–2	3–1	1–1	1–2	3–0	0–1	1–1
Ionikos	1–0	2–1	2–0	1–0	3–1		3–1	4–1	3–1	1–0	3–0	1–1	4–0	0–1	2–1	1–0	1–0	4–2	1–0	1–1
Kastoria	2–1	3–1	3–0	1–0	1–0	2–0		0–2	1–0	1–0	2–1	2–2	2–1	1–1	1–1	0–2	1–0	2–0	2–0	2–0
Kavala	1–0	0–0	2–0	1–1	2–1	1–0	2–0		0–0	1–1	2–1	0–0	1–0	1–1	1–0	1–0	3–0	1–1	0–3	0–0
Kilkisiakos	1–2	2–1	0–0	1–3	5–0	0–1	1–1	0–0		0–0	2–0	1–2	3–0	3–0	2–1	0–2	1–4	1–1	1–0	1–0
Korinthos	4–2	1–1	1–0	2–0	0–1	2–0	3–1	2–0	2–1		1–1	0–0	1–1	1–0	1–1	2–1	2–0	3–0	0–1	1–0
Levadiakos	1–2	1–0	2–0	2–1	2–1	2–1	2–0	2–0	3–0	0–0		1–0	2–0	0–2	3–0	2–1	2–0	3–1	2–0	1–0
Makedonikos	5–1	1–1	1–1	0–5	3–0	4–0	1–0	2–1	3–0	1–0	1–2		1–1	2–1	2–2	1–1	2–1	2–1	2–2	0–0
Olympiacos Volos	3–1	4–0	0–0	0–0	2–0	1–1	1–0	2–0	4–0	2–0	1–0	1–0		3–0	3–0	2–1	1–0	3–2	1–0	1–1
Panachaiki	0–1	1–0	5–1	0–1	6–1	3–0	3–0	2–0	2–1	0–1	2–1	2–1	1–0		8–1	4–2	2–0	3–1	4–1	4–2
Panetolikos	3–2	0–1	1–0	2–0	2–0	3–1	1–1	0–0	0–0	1–0	2–1	1–0	1–0	0–1		1–0	2–0	0–1	3–1	1–1
Panserraikos	2–0	2–0	2–0	1–0	4–0	4–0	4–1	1–0	3–1	2–0	1–0	1–0	0–0	1–2	6–2		3–1	1–0	2–0	4–2
Pierikos	2–0	1–0	3–1	3–0	3–3	3–0	3–2	1–1	3–0	1–0	1–2	4–0	3–1	1–1	1–1	0–0		1–0	2–0	0–1
Proodeftiki	2–0	1–1	1–0	2–0	4–0	2–2	0–1	1–2	4–0	0–1	1–1	2–0	1–0	2–1	1–1	1–0	3–1		2–1	3–0
Trikala	2–0	2–1	1–1	1–1	2–0	1–1	1–1	1–0	1–0	1–0	1–0	2–0	0–0	0–0	1–1	1–0	1–0	2–0		0–0
Xanthi	0–0	1–2	0–0	2–1	4–1	2–0	1–2	1–0	2–0	1–0	1–0	5–1	1–0	3–1	4–0	0–0	0–2	3–0	5–0	

Legend: Blue = home team win; Yellow = draw; Red = away team win.

== Top scorers ==
Rank	Player	Club	Goals
1	(Greece) Kostas Kottakis	Ionikos	20
2	(Greece) Nikos Kriezis	Skoda Xanthi	18
3	(Greece) Apostolis Drakopoulos	Panachaiki	16
4	(Greece) Dimitris Koutas	Levadiakos	14
4	(Greece) Tsakouridis	Makedonikos	14
4	(Greece) Zisis Tsekos	Panserraikos	14
