= 1977–78 Beta Ethniki =

Beta Ethniki
- Season: 1977–78
- Dates: 18 September 1977 – 21 June 1978
- Champions: Rodos (South); AEL (North)
- Promoted: Rodos; AEL
- Relegated: Atromitos Piraeus; AE Mesolongi; AFC Patra; Agios Dimitrios; Panthrakikos; Pandramaikos; Elassona; Thyella Serres

Beta Ethniki 1977–78 complete season.

== South Group ==
=== League table ===
Pos	Team	Pld	W	D	L	GF	GA	GD	Pts	Promotion or relegation
1	Rodos (C, P)	38	26	7	5	68	25	+43	59	Promotion to Alpha Ethniki
2	Atromitos	38	21	10	7	58	26	+32	52	
3	Panelefsiniakos	38	20	8	10	47	19	+28	48	
4	Kallithea	38	19	7	12	43	32	+11	45	
5	Fostiras	38	16	11	11	60	47	+13	43	
6	Proodeftiki	38	17	7	14	56	40	+16	41	
7	Chalkida	38	14	13	11	41	29	+12	41	
8	Korinthos	38	19	6	13	57	33	+24	40 (Note: Korinthos had 4 points deducted.)	
9	Ionikos	38	18	4	16	45	39	+6	40	
10	Ilisiakos	38	14	10	14	47	48	−1	38	
11	Ethnikos Asteras	38	16	6	16	53	55	−2	38	
12	Chania	38	13	12	13	40	50	−10	38	
13	Panarkadikos	38	14	9	15	43	46	−3	37	
14	Olympiacos Liosia	38	14	9	15	38	49	−11	37	
15	Panetolikos	38	13	10	15	65	49	+16	36	
16	Irodotos	38	14	8	16	40	48	−8	36	
17	Atromitos Piraeus (R)	38	13	7	18	48	52	−4	33	Relegation to C National Amateur Division
18	AE Mesolongi (R)	38	9	6	23	36	64	−28	24	Relegation to C National Amateur Division
19	AFC Patra (R)	38	7	4	27	35	94	−59	18	Relegation to C National Amateur Division
20	Agios Dimitrios (R)	38	3	6	29	37	107	−70	9 (Note: Agios Dimitrios had 3 points deducted.)	Relegation to C National Amateur Division

(C) Champions; (P) Promoted; (R) Relegated

== North Group ==
=== League table ===
Pos	Team	Pld	W	D	L	GF	GA	GD	Pts	Promotion or relegation
1	AEL (C, P)	38	25	9	4	58	17	+41	59	Promotion to Alpha Ethniki
2	Olympiacos Volos	38	24	9	5	84	32	+52	57	
3	Doxa Drama	38	17	10	11	49	31	+18	44	
4	Apollon Kalamarias	38	16	11	11	48	30	+18	43	
5	Anagennisi Karditsa	38	13	14	11	41	38	+3	40	
6	Edessaikos	38	14	12	12	34	41	−7	40	
7	Anagennisi Epanomi	38	15	9	14	46	37	+9	39	
8	Almopos Aridea	38	16	7	15	40	35	+5	39	
9	Makedonikos	38	12	15	11	39	43	−4	39	
10	Trikala	38	13	11	14	50	53	−3	37	
11	Niki Volos	38	15	6	17	48	39	+9	36	
12	Kilkisiakos	38	13	10	15	44	46	−2	36	
13	Levadiakos	38	14	8	16	36	45	−9	36	
14	Naoussa	38	13	9	16	43	45	−2	35	
15	Lamia	38	12	11	15	43	58	−15	35	
16	Xanthi	38	12	10	16	40	37	+3	34	
17	Panthrakikos (R)	38	12	8	18	44	46	−2	32	Relegation to C National Amateur Division
18	Pandramaikos (R)	38	11	10	17	35	37	−2	32	Relegation to C National Amateur Division
19	Elassona (R)	38	11	10	17	31	64	−33	32	Relegation to C National Amateur Division
20	Thyella Serres (R)	38	5	5	28	25	104	−79	15	Relegation to C National Amateur Division

(C) Champions; (P) Promoted; (R) Relegated
