= 1987–88 Beta Ethniki =

Beta Ethniki
- Season: 1987–88
- Dates: 6 September 1987 – 15 May 1988
- Champions: Doxa Drama
- Promoted: Doxa Drama; Olympiacos Volos; Apollon Athens
- Relegated: Edessaikos; Acharnaikos; Trikala; Chalkida

Beta Ethniki 1987–88 complete season.

== League table ==
Location of teams in 1987–88 Beta Ethniki

Pos	Team	Pld	W	D	L	GF	GA	GD	Pts	Promotion or relegation
1	Doxa Drama (C, P)	34	20	4	10	68	36	+32	44	Promotion to Alpha Ethniki
2	Olympiacos Volos (P)	34	16	7	11	45	34	+11	39	Promotion to Alpha Ethniki
3	Apollon Athens (P)	34	14	11	9	52	38	+14	39	Promotion to Alpha Ethniki
4	Kastoria	34	15	9	10	56	42	+14	39	
5	Charavgiakos	34	13	12	9	32	26	+6	38	
6	Korinthos	34	13	9	12	44	38	+6	35	
7	Athinaikos	34	14	7	13	41	45	−4	35	
8	Pierikos	34	11	12	11	46	37	+9	34	
9	Kavala	34	13	8	13	35	39	−4	34	
10	Naoussa	34	12	10	12	41	49	−8	34	
11	Xanthi	34	14	5	15	44	41	+3	33	
12	PAS Giannina (Note: PAS Giannina had 5 points deducted.)	34	15	7	12	33	34	−1	32	
13	Ionikos	34	12	8	14	38	39	−1	32	
14	Kallithea	34	11	10	13	33	40	−7	32	
15	Edessaikos (R)	34	13	5	16	42	52	−10	31	Relegation to Gamma Ethniki
16	Acharnaikos (R)	34	10	11	13	45	51	−6	31	Relegation to Gamma Ethniki
17	Trikala (R)	34	9	10	15	31	43	−12	28	Relegation to Gamma Ethniki
18	Chalkida (R)	34	5	7	22	27	66	−39	17	Relegation to Gamma Ethniki

(C) Champions; (P) Promoted; (R) Relegated

== Results ==
Home \ Away	ACH	APA	ATH	CHA	CHV	DOX	EDE	ION	KLT	KAS	KAV	KOR	NAO	EOV	PAS	PIE	TRI	XAN
Acharnaikos		2–0	4–1	4–1	2–0	2–2	0–2	0–0	2–1	1–0	2–2	1–2	2–1	0–0	0–0	4–3	1–0	3–0
Apollon Athens	1–0		1–2	3–2	3–1	3–2	2–1	2–1	2–2	3–3	2–1	0–0	5–0	1–3	4–0	2–1	4–1	1–1
Athinaikos	1–1	0–0		1–0	0–2	3–1	5–1	1–1	1–0	1–1	1–0	1–2	2–0	3–2	2–0	0–0	2–0	1–0
Chalkida	1–1	0–2	2–2		0–0	0–1	3–1	3–1	2–1	2–3	1–1	1–3	0–1	2–2	2–1	1–1	0–2	2–1
Charavgiakos	0–0	2–1	3–1	5–0		1–0	1–1	1–0	2–1	0–0	1–0	2–2	0–0	1–0	0–0	0–0	2–1	2–0
Doxa Drama	1–0	2–0	3–1	5–1	0–1		5–1	3–1	1–0	3–0	6–0	4–0	4–0	2–0	1–0	2–1	1–0	0–1
Edessaikos	1–0	1–1	0–2	1–0	1–0	1–2		3–1	1–0	2–1	2–1	3–0	1–2	1–0	4–0	2–1	1–1	1–0
Ionikos	3–0	1–0	1–2	2–0	0–1	1–1	3–0		0–0	1–1	1–0	3–0	1–0	3–1	3–0	0–0	2–0	2–1
Kallithea	2–0	1–0	0–1	2–0	1–1	0–4	2–1	3–1		0–0	2–0	2–1	1–0	1–0	1–2	2–1	4–1	1–1
Kastoria	5–2	0–1	2–1	3–1	2–0	4–1	2–1	4–0	1–1		4–1	3–0	3–0	2–0	0–0	3–2	1–0	3–1
Kavala	2–0	2–0	1–0	0–0	3–1	1–0	2–0	2–0	0–0	1–1		3–0	1–0	1–0	2–1	2–0	2–0	1–1
Korinthos	1–1	1–0	5–0	2–0	1–0	3–3	2–1	1–0	0–0	2–1	1–1		5–0	1–1	2–1	2–2	1–0	1–2
Naoussa	2–2	1–1	1–1	1–0	1–1	1–0	2–2	4–2	2–1	1–1	2–0	3–1		2–0	2–0	0–0	2–0	3–1
Olympiacos Volos	2–1	0–0	2–1	3–0	1–0	2–1	3–2	2–0	5–0	3–2	2–0	1–0	1–1		1–0	0–0	4–1	2–0
PAS Giannina	3–0	1–4	1–0	2–0	2–0	1–0	1–1	0–0	4–0	4–0	3–1	3–0	3–2	3–0		2–0	2–0	2–1
Pierikos	2–2	1–1	3–0	4–0	1–1	0–1	2–1	1–2	1–1	2–0	3–0	2–0	1–0	2–1	4–1		0–0	1–0
Trikala	4–2	1–1	1–0	2–0	0–0	2–4	2–0	0–0	0–0	1–0	0–0	2–2	2–0	0–0	1–1	3–2		2–0
Xanthi	5–3	1–1	4–1	2–0	1–0	0–2	3–0	2–1	2–0	3–0	2–1	1–0	4–0	0–1	0–0	1–2	2–1	

Legend: Blue = home team win; Yellow = draw; Red = away team win.

== Top scorers ==
Rank	Player	Club	Goals
1	(Greece) Kostas Kottakis	Ionikos	18
2	(Greece) Dimitris Nolis	Kastoria	17
3	(Greece) Nikos Gambetas	Doxa Drama	15
3	(Greece) Konstantinos Krasonis	Athinaikos	15
5	(Bulgaria) Plamen Tsvetkov	Doxa Drama	14
5	(Greece) Georgios Karanikas	Apollon Athens	14
