= 1978–79 Beta Ethniki =

Beta Ethniki
- Season: 1978–79
- Dates: 17 September 1978 – 10 June 1979
- Champions: Korinthos (South); Doxa Drama (North)
- Promoted: Korinthos; Doxa Drama
- Relegated: Chalkida; Ionikos; AO Drapetsona; Olympiacos Liosia; Pierikos; Anagennisi Arta; AO Karditsa; Apollon Kalamarias

Beta Ethniki 1978–79 complete season.

== South Group ==
=== League table ===
Pos	Team	Pld	W	D	L	GF	GA	GD	Pts	Promotion or relegation
1	Korinthos (C, P)	38	25	8	5	78	23	+55	58	Promotion to Alpha Ethniki
2	Atromitos	38	24	6	8	64	29	+35	54	
3	Panelefsiniakos	37	17	9	11	56	41	+15	43	
4	Proodeftiki	38	15	11	12	49	36	+13	41	
5	Panetolikos	38	17	7	14	48	46	+2	41	
6	Irodotos	38	18	4	16	55	58	−3	40	
7	Ilisiakos	38	16	6	16	48	52	−4	38	
8	Kallithea	38	14	8	16	44	46	−2	36	
9	Levadiakos	38	15	6	17	56	58	−2	36	
10	Fostiras	38	15	6	17	44	53	−9	36	
11	Ethnikos Asteras	38	10	15	13	43	49	−6	35	
12	Lamia	38	13	9	16	44	50	−6	35	
13	Olympiakos Loutraki	38	13	9	16	42	50	−8	35	
14	Acharnaikos	38	14	7	17	32	42	−10	35	
15	Chalkida (R)	38	14	7	17	37	46	−9	35	Relegation to C National Amateur Division
16	Panarkadikos	38	16	7	15	45	45	0	33 (Note: Panarkadikos had 6 points deducted.)	
17	Chania	37	12	8	17	38	53	−15	32	
18	Ionikos (R)	38	13	9	16	43	41	+2	32 (Note: Ionikos had 3 points deducted.)	Relegation to C National Amateur Division
19	AO Drapetsona (R)	38	8	12	18	33	48	−15	28	Relegation to C National Amateur Division
20	Olympiacos Liosia (R)	38	8	10	20	35	65	−30	26	Relegation to C National Amateur Division

(C) Champions; (P) Promoted; (R) Relegated

== North Group ==
=== League table ===
Pos	Team	Pld	W	D	L	GF	GA	GD	Pts	Promotion or relegation
1	Doxa Drama (C, P)	38	26	8	4	58	17	+41	59 (Note: Doxa Drama and Anagennisi Arta had 1 point deducted.)	Promotion to Alpha Ethniki
2	Olympiacos Volos	38	23	10	5	67	25	+42	56	
3	Pierikos (Note: Pierikos was relegated after was found guilty of game fixing against Niki Volos.) (R)	38	20	7	11	75	36	+39	45 (Note: Pierikos, Trikala and Anagennisi Arta had 2 points deducted.)	Relegation to C National Amateur Division
4	Anagennisi Karditsa	38	16	6	16	53	47	+6	38	
5	Edessaikos	38	12	13	13	42	40	+2	37	
6	Anagennisi Epanomi	38	14	9	15	36	39	−3	37	
7	Trikala	38	14	10	14	42	38	+4	36	
8	Naoussa	38	13	10	15	47	52	−5	36	
9	Anagennisi Giannitsa	38	12	12	14	42	48	−6	36	
10	Niki Volos	38	14	8	16	42	52	−10	36	
11	Makedonikos	38	14	7	17	40	41	−1	35	
12	Xanthi	38	13	8	17	33	45	−12	34	
13	Almopos Aridea	38	12	10	16	30	41	−11	34	
14	Agrotikos Asteras	38	11	12	15	41	54	−13	34	
15	Kilkisiakos	38	13	7	18	42	38	+4	33	
16	Veria	38	13	7	18	52	53	−1	33	
17	Makedonikos Siatista	38	14	5	19	47	65	−18	33	
18	Anagennisi Arta (R)	38	13	7	18	38	60	−22	31	Relegation to C National Amateur Division
19	AO Karditsa (R)	38	12	7	19	39	51	−12	30	Relegation to C National Amateur Division
20	Apollon Kalamarias (R)	38	14	4	20	36	50	−14	29 (Note: Apollon Kalamarias had 3 points deducted.)	Relegation to C National Amateur Division

(C) Champions; (P) Promoted; (R) Relegated
