= 1968–69 Beta Ethniki =

Beta Ethniki
- Season: 1968–69
- Dates: 6 October 1968 – 1 June 1969
- Champions: Panachaiki (South); Kavala (North)
- Promoted: Panachaiki; Proodeftiki; Kavala; Olympiacos Volos
- Relegated: None

Beta Ethniki 1968–69 complete season.

== South Group ==
=== League table ===
| Pos | Team | Pld | W | D | L | GF | GA | GD | Pts | Promotion or qualification |
|---|---|---|---|---|---|---|---|---|---|---|
| 1 | Panachaiki (C, P) | 34 | 22 | 7 | 5 | 68 | 33 | +35 | 85 | Promotion to Alpha Ethniki |
| 2 | Proodeftiki (P) | 34 | 19 | 9 | 6 | 50 | 30 | +20 | 81 | Qualification for Promotion play-off |
| 3 | Fostiras | 34 | 14 | 9 | 11 | 45 | 35 | +10 | 71 | |
| 4 | Kalamata | 34 | 13 | 11 | 10 | 36 | 31 | +5 | 71 | |
| 5 | PAS Giannina | 34 | 15 | 6 | 13 | 40 | 38 | +2 | 70 | |
| 6 | Panelefsiniakos | 34 | 12 | 11 | 11 | 45 | 37 | +8 | 69 | |
| 7 | Panetolikos | 34 | 14 | 7 | 13 | 45 | 40 | +5 | 69 | |
| 8 | Atromitos | 34 | 12 | 9 | 13 | 46 | 45 | +1 | 67 | |
| 9 | Ikaros Athens | 34 | 11 | 11 | 12 | 44 | 44 | 0 | 67 | |
| 10 | Atromitos Piraeus | 34 | 9 | 14 | 11 | 27 | 35 | −8 | 66 | |
| 11 | Argonaftis Piraeus | 34 | 10 | 11 | 13 | 42 | 43 | −1 | 65 | |
| 12 | Ethnikos Asteras | 34 | 10 | 11 | 13 | 37 | 42 | −5 | 65 | |
| 13 | Korinthos | 34 | 12 | 7 | 15 | 37 | 43 | −6 | 65 | |
| 14 | Rodos | 34 | 10 | 11 | 13 | 35 | 41 | −6 | 65 | |
| 15 | Aias Salamina | 34 | 11 | 9 | 14 | 23 | 36 | −13 | 65 | |
| 16 | Levadiakos | 34 | 9 | 12 | 13 | 22 | 21 | +1 | 64 | |
| 17 | Ionikos | 34 | 7 | 14 | 13 | 23 | 39 | −16 | 62 | |
| 18 | Chania | 34 | 8 | 7 | 19 | 31 | 63 | −32 | 57 | |

(C) Champions; (P) Promoted

== North Group ==
=== League table ===
| Pos | Team | Pld | W | D | L | GF | GA | GD | Pts | Promotion or qualification |
|---|---|---|---|---|---|---|---|---|---|---|
| 1 | Kavala (C, P) | 34 | 23 | 6 | 5 | 75 | 18 | +57 | 86 | Promotion to Alpha Ethniki |
| 2 | Olympiacos Volos (P) | 34 | 21 | 5 | 8 | 53 | 27 | +26 | 81 | Qualification for Promotion play-off |
| 3 | Doxa Drama | 34 | 16 | 9 | 9 | 44 | 24 | +20 | 75 | |
| 4 | Apollon Kalamarias | 34 | 15 | 11 | 8 | 45 | 28 | +17 | 75 | |
| 5 | Lamia | 34 | 17 | 7 | 10 | 50 | 35 | +15 | 75 | |
| 6 | Niki Volos | 34 | 16 | 7 | 11 | 39 | 33 | +6 | 73 | |
| 7 | Kozani | 34 | 13 | 8 | 13 | 33 | 40 | −7 | 68 | |
| 8 | Edessaikos | 34 | 11 | 11 | 12 | 36 | 38 | −2 | 67 | |
| 9 | AE Florina | 34 | 13 | 7 | 14 | 34 | 40 | −6 | 67 | |
| 10 | Anagennisi Giannitsa | 34 | 13 | 6 | 15 | 48 | 50 | −2 | 66 | |
| 11 | Makedonikos | 34 | 11 | 9 | 14 | 46 | 37 | +9 | 65 | |
| 12 | Ethnikos Alexandroupoli | 34 | 12 | 7 | 15 | 37 | 46 | −9 | 65 | |
| 13 | Orchomenos | 34 | 11 | 6 | 17 | 54 | 69 | −15 | 62 | |
| 14 | Xanthi | 34 | 11 | 6 | 17 | 36 | 61 | −25 | 62 | |
| 15 | Aris Ptolemaida | 34 | 11 | 7 | 16 | 28 | 47 | −19 | 62 (Note: Aris Ptolemaida had 1 point deducted.) | |
| 16 | Kastoria | 34 | 9 | 9 | 16 | 26 | 49 | −23 | 61 | |
| 17 | AEL | 34 | 11 | 4 | 19 | 37 | 43 | −6 | 60 | |
| 18 | Megas Alexandros Thessaloniki | 34 | 8 | 3 | 23 | 23 | 57 | −34 | 53 | |

(C) Champions; (P) Promoted

== Promotion play-off ==
| Team 1 | Agg. | Team 2 | 1st leg | 2nd leg | Play-off |
|---|---|---|---|---|---|
| Proodeftiki^{*} | 1–1 | Apollon Athens | 1–0 | 0–1 | 0–0 |
| Olympiakos Volos | 6–5 | Veria | 2–1 | 2–3 | 2–1 |

^{*}Proodeftiki won on flip of a coin.
