= 1966–67 Beta Ethniki =

Beta Ethniki
- Season: 1966–67
- Dates: 30 October 1966 – 7 June 1967
- Champions: Panelefsiniakos (Group 1); Olympiacos Volos (Group 2); Kavala (Group 3)
- Promoted: Panelefsiniakos; Olympiacos Volos
- Relegated: Ergotelis; Panegialios; Argonaftis Piraeus; Thyella Patras; Panargiakos; Olympiakos Patras; Panarkadikos; Bizani Ioannina; AE Chalandri; Orchomenos; Rodiakos; AE Mytilenes; PAO Kalogreza; Anagennisi Karditsa; Dorieas; AE Tyrnavos; MENT Toumba; Kilkisiakos; Megas Alexandros Thessaloniki; Ethnikos Alexandroupoli; Aspida Xanthi

Beta Ethniki 1966–67 complete season.

== Group 1 ==
=== League table ===
Pos	Team	Pld	W	D	L	GF	GA	GD	Pts	Qualification or relegation
1	Panelefsiniakos (C, P)	34	24	6	4	91	25	+66	88	Qualification for Promotion play-off
2	Panachaiki	34	23	6	5	75	36	+39	86	
3	OFI	34	22	7	5	77	24	+53	85	
4	Apollon Kalamata	34	18	8	8	43	30	+13	78	
5	Ionikos	34	17	8	9	51	33	+18	76	
6	PAS Giannina	34	18	5	11	60	43	+17	75	
7	Panetolikos	35	15	9	11	45	32	+13	73 (Note: Panetolikos had 1 point deducted.)	
8	Aias Salamina	34	15	6	13	58	43	+15	70	
9	Atromitos Piraeus	34	14	5	15	49	43	+6	67	
10	Ergotelis (R)	34	15	5	14	51	47	+4	67 (Note: Ergotelis had 2 points deducted.)	Relegation to C National Amateur Division
11	Panegialios (R)	34	11	10	13	52	47	+5	66	Relegation to C National Amateur Division
12	Chania	34	13	4	17	37	56	−19	64	
13	Argonaftis Piraeus (R)	34	10	10	14	44	45	−1	64	Relegation to C National Amateur Division
14	Thyella Patras (R)	34	13	3	18	43	67	−24	63	Relegation to C National Amateur Division
15	Panargiakos (R)	34	10	7	17	38	61	−23	61	Relegation to C National Amateur Division
16	Olympiakos Patras (R)	34	8	4	22	45	70	−25	48 (Note: ?6 points deducted?)	Relegation to C National Amateur Division
17	Panarkadikos (R)	34	3	3	28	32	114	−82	38 (Note: Panarkadikos had 5 points deducted.)	Relegation to C National Amateur Division
18	Bizani Ioannina (R)	34	1	6	27	23	98	−75	38 (Note: ?4 points deducted?)	Relegation to C National Amateur Division

(C) Champions; (P) Promoted; (R) Relegated

== Group 2 ==
=== League table ===
Pos	Team	Pld	W	D	L	GF	GA	GD	Pts	Qualification or relegation
1	Olympiacos Volos (C, P)	34	20	10	4	54	21	+33	84	Qualification for Promotion play-off
2	Diagoras	34	20	9	5	48	26	+22	83	
3	Fostiras	34	22	3	9	87	40	+47	81	
4	Olympiakos Chalkida	34	18	8	8	60	32	+28	78	
5	Lamia	34	13	11	10	60	51	+9	71	
6	Ethnikos Asteras	34	14	9	11	39	37	+2	71	
7	Atromitos	34	15	6	13	44	37	+7	70	
8	Niki Volos	34	12	12	10	54	48	+6	70	
9	Evripos Chalkida	34	13	10	11	46	43	+3	70	
10	Korinthos	34	15	4	15	56	51	+5	68	
11	Levadiakos	34	13	7	14	48	55	−7	67	
12	AE Chalandri (R)	34	10	10	14	39	41	−2	64	Relegation to C National Amateur Division
13	Orchomenos (R)	34	10	10	14	42	58	−16	64	Relegation to C National Amateur Division
14	Rodiakos (R)	34	13	2	19	47	59	−12	62	Relegation to C National Amateur Division
15	AE Mytilenes (R)	34	11	4	19	46	67	−21	60	Relegation to C National Amateur Division
16	PAO Kalogreza (R)	34	9	9	16	43	54	−11	57 (Note: PAO Kalogreza had 4 points deducted.)	Relegation to C National Amateur Division
17	Anagennisi Karditsa (R)	34	6	4	24	33	71	−38	49 (Note: Anagennisi Karditsa had 1 point deducted.)	Relegation to C National Amateur Division
18	Dorieas (R)	34	5	6	23	28	83	−55	47 (Note: Dorieas had 3 points deducted.)	Relegation to C National Amateur Division

(C) Champions; (P) Promoted; (R) Relegated

== Group 3 ==
=== League table ===
Pos	Team	Pld	W	D	L	GF	GA	GD	Pts	Qualification or relegation
1	Kavala (C)	32	21	7	4	57	18	+39	81	Qualification for Promotion play-off
2	Apollon Kalamarias	32	14	15	3	42	25	+17	74 (Note: Apollon Kalamarias, Aris Ptolemaida, Kastoria and Ethnikos Alexandroupoli had 1 point deducted.)	
3	Anagennisi Giannitsa	32	14	9	9	40	29	+11	69	
4	Aris Ptolemaida	32	15	6	11	51	33	+18	67	
5	Makedonikos	32	11	13	8	36	26	+10	67	
6	Edessaikos	32	13	7	12	42	38	+4	65	
7	Doxa Drama	32	11	10	11	35	36	−1	64	
8	Kastoria	32	9	15	8	30	33	−3	64	
9	Olympiakos Kozani	32	8	14	10	32	36	−4	62	
10	AEL	32	10	10	12	38	45	−7	62	
11	Nikiforos Florina	32	12	4	16	43	51	−8	60	
12	AE Tyrnavos (R)	32	9	10	13	19	32	−13	60	Relegation to C National Amateur Division
13	MENT Toumba (R)	32	10	7	15	33	40	−7	59	Relegation to C National Amateur Division
14	Kilkisiakos (R)	32	8	11	13	27	50	−23	59	Relegation to C National Amateur Division
15	Megas Alexandros Thessaloniki (R)	32	9	8	15	38	44	−6	58	Relegation to C National Amateur Division
16	Ethnikos Alexandroupoli (R)	32	10	6	16	33	46	−13	57	Relegation to C National Amateur Division
17	Aspida Xanthi (R)	32	8	8	16	37	51	−14	56	Relegation to C National Amateur Division

(C) Champions; (R) Relegated

== Promotion play-off ==
Pos	Team	Pld	W	D	L	GF	GA	GD	Pts
1	Olympiacos Volos	4	1	2	1	3	3	0	8
2	Panelefsiniakos	4	1	2	1	3	3	0	8
3	Kavala	4	0	4	0	2	2	0	8

Home \ Away	OLV	PNE	KAV
Olympiacos Volos		1–0	1–1
Panelefsiniakos	2–1		0–0
Kavala	0–0	1–1	

Legend: Blue = home team win; Yellow = draw; Red = away team win.

=== Replay ===
Team 1	Score	Team 2
Olympiacos Volos	0–0	Kavala
Panelefsiniakos	3–1	Kavala
Olympiacos Volos	2–1	Panelefsiniakos

Pos	Team	Pld	W	D	L	GF	GA	GD	Pts	Promotion
1	Olympiacos Volos (P)	2	1	1	0	2	1	+1	5	Promotion to Alpha Ethniki
2	Panelefsiniakos (P)	2	1	0	1	4	3	+1	4	Promotion to Alpha Ethniki
3	Kavala	2	0	1	1	1	3	−2	3	

(P) Promoted
