= Volos Municipal Stadium =

Football stadium in Volos, Greece

Δημοτικό Στάδιο Βόλου
- Interactive map of Δημοτικό Στάδιο Βόλου
- Location: Volos, Greece
- Coordinates: 39°21′19.66″N 22°58′03.89″E
- Owner: Municipality of Volos
- Operator: Olympiacos Volos FC
- Capacity: 9,000 - 5700 current
- Surface: Grass
- Scoreboard: Yes

Construction
- Built: 1962
- Renovated: 1990, 2004, 2005

Tenant
- Olympiacos Volos F.C. (1962–2008, 2009–10, 2013–2016, 2023-present)

Volos Municipal Stadium is a sports stadium in Volos, Greece. It is used for football matches and was one of the Olympic training venues of the 2004 Summer Olympic Games. The stadium was built in 1962 and renovated in 2004. It has a capacity of 9,000 people and it is the homeground of the local football club Olympiacos Volos. Record attendance is 17,200 spectators but this was before plastic seats were introduced. The complete reconstruction of this stadium was planned to begin at summer 2014. However, due to economic problems of the club, the reconstruction never started but some improvements have already been made.
