= Football League (Greece) =

Defunct professional men's association football league in Greece

- Organising body: A2 & Beta National Divisions Professional Football Association
- Founded: 1960; 66 years ago (informal); 1962; 64 years ago
- First season: Atypi Beta Ethniki Katigoria, Greek: Άτυπη Β΄ Εθνική Κατηγορία, lit. 'Informal Second National Division' (1960); Beta Ethniki Katigoria, Greek: Β΄ Εθνική Κατηγορία, lit. 'Second National Division' (1962–63); Alpha Katigoria, Greek: Α΄ Κατηγορία, lit. 'First Division' (2000–01); Beta Ethniki Katigoria, Greek: Β΄ Εθνική Κατηγορία, lit. 'Second National Division' (2001–02); Football League / Beta Ethniki Katigoria, Greek: Φούτμπολ Λιγκ / Β΄ Εθνική Κατηγορία, lit. 'Football League / Second National Division' (2010–11)
- Folded: 2021; 5 years ago
- Country: Greece
- Confederation: UEFA
- Number of clubs: 20 (2020–21)
- Level on pyramid: 2 (1962–2019); 3 (2019–2021)
- Promotion to: Super League 2
- Relegation to: Gamma Ethniki
- Domestic cup: Greece Cup
- Last champions: Kalamata (1st title); Veria (1st title) (2020–21)
- Most championships: Panachaiki (6 titles)
- Top scorer: Ilias Chatzieleftheriou (152 goals)

The Football League (Greek: Φούτμπολ Λιγκ), also officially known as Beta Ethniki Katigoria (Greek: Β΄ Εθνική Κατηγορία, lit. 'Second National Division'), was a second-tier professional men's association football league in Greece from its inception in 1962 as Beta Ethniki and until 2019. It then served as a third-tier professional men's association football league after the creation of the Greek Super League 2 as the new second-tier professional men's association football league and it was eventually abolished in 2021 when the 2021–22 Super League 2 went from a 12 team to a 36 team league, absorbing most of the clubs from the Football League.

== History ==
=== As the Second National Division (1962–2019) ===
As the second tier of the Greek football league system, the Beta Ethniki was formally established in the fall of 1962, replacing an informal format of second category. All participating clubs had to disengage from their local football clubs associations' championships as a prerequisite for eligibility.

In its early years, the competition format was frequently altered each season. The competition was originally held in four groups of 14 clubs each until 1968–69, when the competition was reformatted to contain two groups. The following six years (1969–70 up to 1974–75), the competition was held with three Groups, whereas from 1975 to 1976 up to 1982–83 the league was again contested in two Groups, North and South. In the autumn of 1983, a single, pan-Hellenic League Table was established, a format that has been applied continuously until the 2012–13 season. When football in Greece became professional, the Hellenic Football Federation handed over the responsibility for the competition's organization to the Greek Professional Football Clubs Association (Greek: ΕΠΑΕ). In 2006, the Professional Football Association of the Second and Third National Divisions (Greek: ΕΕΠ Β΄ & Γ΄ Εθνικής) was set up, which replaced the Greek Professional Football Clubs Association as the governing authority of the Second and Third National Divisions.

In August 2010, the division's governing body decided to change its own, as well as the competition's distinctive title to Football League. The competition was contested as the Second National Division until 2019, when the Greek football league system was restructured and the Super League 2 was established as the new feeder league to the Super League.

=== As the Third National Division (2019–2021) ===
As of 2019, the Football League Greece replaced the Gamma Ethniki as the third tier of the Greek football league system. It was finally abolished in 2021 with most clubs being absorbed into the second tier Super League 2.

== Structure of the league ==
There were 20 clubs that competed in the Football League until 2021, playing each other in a home and away series. At the end of the season, the bottom four teams were relegated to the Gamma Ethniki. The top two teams gained automatic promotion. Unlike the Super League, clubs in the Football League did not get relegated if the club failed to obtain a license. All teams in the Football League took part in the Greek Cup.

== Results ==
=== Second Division champions (1960 until 2018–19) ===
==== From 1960 to 1962 ====
| Season | Winner |
|---|---|
| 1960 | Atromitos Piraeus (1), Fostiras (1), Thermaikos Thessaloniki (1) |
| 1961 | Egaleo (1), Panelefsiniakos (1), Niki Volos (1), Aspida Xanthi (1) |
| 1962 | Panegialios (1), Pierikos (1) |

==== From 1962 to 1983 ====
| Season | Winner |
|---|---|
| 1962–63 | Edessaikos (1), Doxa Drama (1), Olympiacos Chalkida (1), Pagkorinthiakos (1) |
| 1963–64 | Panachaiki (1), Proodeftiki (1), Philippi Kavala (1) |
| 1964–65 | Panserraikos (1), Edessaikos (2), Egaleo (2), Vyzas Megara (1) |
| 1965–66 | Veria (1), OFI (1), Vyzas Megara (2) |
| 1966–67 | Panelefsiniakos (1), Kavala (1), Olympiacos Volos (1) |
| 1967–68 | Chalkida (1), Trikala (1) |
| 1968–69 | Panachaiki (2), Kavala (2) |
| 1969–70 | Apollon Smyrnis (1), Veria (2), Fostiras (2) |
| 1970–71 | Panachaiki (3), Trikala (2), Olympiacos Volos (2) |
| 1971–72 | Panserraikos (2), Kalamata (1), Atromitos (1) |
| 1972–73 | Apollon Smyrnis (2), Apollon Kalamarias (1), AEL (1) |
| 1973–74 | PAS Giannina (1), Kastoria (1), Kalamata (2) |
| 1974–75 | Apollon Smyrnis (3), Panetolikos (1), Pierikos (2) |
| 1975–76 | Kavala (3), OFI (2) |
| 1976–77 | Egaleo (3), Veria (3) |
| 1977–78 | Rodos (1), AEL (2) |
| 1978–79 | Doxa Drama (2), Korinthos (1) |
| 1979–80 | Panserraikos (3), Atromitos (2) |
| 1980–81 | Rodos (2), Iraklis (1) |
| 1981–82 | Panachaiki (4), Makedonikos (1) |
| 1982–83 | Egaleo (4), Apollon Pontus (2) |

==== From 1983 to 2019 ====
| Season | Winner |
|---|---|
| 1983–84 | Panachaiki (5) |
| 1984–85 | PAS Giannina (2) |
| 1985–86 | Diagoras (1) |
| 1986–87 | Panachaiki (6) |
| 1987–88 | Doxa Drama (3) |
| 1988–89 | Xanthi (1) |
| 1989–90 | Athinaikos (1) |
| 1990–91 | Ethnikos Piraeus (1) |
| 1991–92 | Apollon Pontus (3) |
| 1992–93 | Naoussa (1) |
| 1993–94 | Ionikos (1) |
| 1994–95 | Paniliakos (1) |

| Season | Winner |
|---|---|
| 1995–96 | Kavala (4) |
| 1996–97 | Panionios (1) |
| 1997–98 | Aris (1) |
| 1998–99 | Trikala (4) |
| 1999–00 | Athinaikos (2) |
| 2000–01 | Egaleo (5) |
| 2001–02 | PAS Giannina (3) |
| 2002–03 | Chalkidona (1) |
| 2003–04 | Kerkyra (1) |
| 2004–05 | AEL (3) |
| 2005–06 | Ergotelis (1) |
| 2006–07 | Asteras Tripolis (1) |

| Season | Winner |
|---|---|
| 2007–08 | Panserraikos (4) |
| 2008–09 | Atromitos (3) |
| 2009–10 | Olympiacos Volos (3) |
| 2010–11 | Panetolikos (2) |
| 2011–12 | Panthrakikos (1) |
| 2012–13 | Apollon Smyrnis (4) |
| 2013–14 | Niki Volos (2) |
| 2014–15 | AEK Athens (1) |
| 2015–16 | AEL (4) |
| 2016–17 | Apollon Smyrnis (5) |
| 2017–18 | OFI (3) |
| 2018–19 | Volos (1) |

=== Third Division champions (2019–20 until 2020–21) ===
==== From 2019 to 2021 ====
| Season | Winner |
|---|---|
| 2019–20 | Trikala (1) |
| 2020–21 | Kalamata (1), Veria (1) |

== See also ==
- Greek football league system
- Greek Football Cup
- Greek football PSAP awards
- Football records and statistics in Greece
