= Almopos Aridea F.C. =

Greek football club

Almopos Aridea
- Full name: Athlitikos Podosfairikos Omilos Almopos Aridea
- Founded: 1926; 100 years ago
- Ground: Aridea Municipal Stadium
- Capacity: 700
- Chairman: Fotis Pantelidis
- Manager: Georgios Kokozoglou
- League: Pella FCA Second Division
- 2025–26: Pella FCA First Division, 10th (relegated)
- Website: https://www.almoposfc.gr/
Home colours	Away colours

Almopos Aridea Football Club (Greek: Αλμωπός Αριδαίας) is a Greek professional football club based in Aridea, Pella, Greece.

== History ==
Almopos Aridea was founded in 1926 and its name derives from the ancient region of Almopia, located in the homonymous town of Pella.

The club's last appearance in a professional championship was in the 1984–85 season, when it competed in the Beta Ethniki, where it was relegated due to a deduction.

In recent years, they have been competing in local EPS categories. Pella. In the 2015–16 season, they finished undefeated and had the absolute victory in the championship and climbing bar, with the exception of two clashes, where he was tied, thus winning the promotion to the Gamma Ethniki.

Since 2021–22 season until 2022–23 season, it participated in Super League 2. In season 2023–24 Almopos expelled from the category, due to non-issuance of a Super League 2 certificate.

== Honours ==
=== Domestic ===
- Third Division: 1
  - 1983–84
- Fourth Division: 2
  - 1993–94, 2019–20
- Pella FCA Champions: 6
  - 1971–72, 1987–88, 1999–00, 2000–01, 2012–13, 2015–16
- Pella FCA Cup Winners: 3
  - 2001–02, 2005–06, 2014–15

== Notable former players ==
- Antonis Minou
- Loukas Vyntra
- Giannis Taralidis
- Ilias Solakis
