= Olympiacos Volos F.C. =

Olympiacos Volos
- Full name: 1937–1961; A.O. Olympiacos Volos; 1961–2008; A.O. Ethnikos Olympiacos Volos; 2008–present Olympiacos Volos 1937 F.C.
- Nicknames: Austriakoi (Austrian Boys); Erythrolefki (The Red-Whites)
- Founded: 2 June 1937; 89 years ago
- Ground: Volos Municipal Stadium
- Capacity: 9,000
- Chairman: Vasilis Charvalas
- Manager: Thodoris Skouras
- League: Thessaly FCA First Division
- 2025–26: Thessaly FCA First Division, 2nd
- Website: Club website
Home colours	Away colours	Third colours

Olympiacos Volos Football Club (Greek: Α.Σ. Ολυμπιακός Βόλου 1937) is a Greek football club based in the city of Volos.

== History ==
In 1938 Olympiacos achieved the biggest distinction made from a provincial team at the time, succeeding to enter the quarter-finals Greek Football Cup.

In 1947 Olympiacos won their first Thessalian championship. The year 1954 is very successful for the team. Furthermore, Olympiacos make a great win over Doxa Drama in an away game and Olympiacos becomes Panprovincional champion of Northern Greece and won they ticket to the Panhellenic Championship, where they take the decent 5th place.

The 1955 year then became a notable one in the club history: while the city of Volos was damaged by some earthquakes, Olympiacos Volos had a scheduled Greek Cup match to play in Athens against AEK for the Greek Cup in Athens. Due to the city being heavily damaged and due to lack of media information, it seemed Olympiacos Volos would not have managed to get to Athens in time. However, the team ultimately managed to arrive in the Greek capital city and even eliminated AEK by beating them 0–1 and go further to the quarter-finals.

In 1960 the team reached the round of 16 in Greek Cup. In 1961 they merged with local club Ethnikos Volos, with Ethnikos-Olympiacos Volos being the new denomination, despite this the team is still commonly referred as Olympiacos Volos. In the same year Olympiacos wins the Central Greece championship and had the opportunity to win the promotion in A' Ethniki through a play-off match, which the team lost.

In 1962–63 Olympiacos completed the B' Ethniki league in a remarkable fifth place. In the following season the team ended first, together with Trikala, but lost the promotion once again in a play-off match. This was followed by a fourth and a second place in the two next seasons, before Olympiacos eventually managed to get promoted to the top flight in 1966, after winning the Panthessalian championship and then defeating Panelefsiniakos and Kavala on play-offs.

The first top flight campaign for the club was however not successful, as Olympiacos was relegated in B Ethniki. Despite this, the club promptly managed to recover from that, and get back to the top flight in the very next season after winning Veria in a two-legged play-off. The same year Olympiacos reached the Greek Cup round of 16. Another relegation followed in 1968, after the club ended the league in 16th place.

In the year 1970, Olympiacos won again B' Ethniki and returned in the A' Ethniki for the third time. In 1971–72 the club finished in 13th place they top flight campaign, a result confirmed also in 1972–73 ends in the 13th place.

In the following season, the club ended in 14th place, which would normally have allowed Olympiacos Volos to stay in the first division; nevertheless the Greek federation decided to reduce the number of top-flight teams, thus being relegated to the second tier. In the year 1975–76 Olympiacos ended in third place and even eighth the next season, the latter being the worst placement for the club from the creation of B' Ethniki. In 1977 the club had a much more impressive season, losing the promotion only in the final game to Larissa. Third and sixth place in the two following seasons preceded a 1980 campaign ended in a runner-up placement, only behind Iraklis; a result that was confirmed the following season, where Olympiacos Volos lost promotion to Makedonikos, another Thessalonicean club.

After a fifth place in 1983–84, Olympiacos Volos were relegated in Gama Ethniki in 1984–85 after 21 years in the two Greek professional divisions club after another Volos-based team, Niki Volos, lost a game against Veria which saved the Imathian team from relegation at Olympiacos Volos place and then a big competition created between the two local teams.

The club returned to the second tier only 1986, and even returned to the top flight in 1988. In 1988–1989, the team was strengthened with the addition of Hungarian scorer Imre Boda, who won the league topscorer title, being instrumental in keeping his side into the top flight, ending season in 11th place. Olympiacos returned to the second tier only the following season, ending the 1989–90 season in 17th place. In the 1990s, the club did not achieve any notable success, being relegated once again to third division and staying there for four seasons before to return to the second tier in 1998–1999.

In 2000, Olympiacos made good appearances but due to some unlucky results at the end of the year, it only ended up in seventh place, which was followed by an eighth place the next year. At the same time the club administration began facing financial problems and started collapsing. As a result of that, the club had to start from fourth division, a first time in such a lower tier for the club in 2003.

In 2004, Olympiacos merged with Kassandra F.C., which competed in Beta Ethniki, into A.S.K. Olympiacos F.C. based in Volos and competing in Beta Ethniki. However, also the team competing in Delta Ethniki continued to exist as Ethnikos Olympiacos Volos FC. In 2004–05, A.S.K. Olympiacos F.C. reached the 5th place in Beta Ethniki and changed ownership, but was relegated the following year. In 2007–08, Ethnikos Olympiacos was promoted to Gamma Ethniki and A.S.K. Olympiacos F.C. to Beta Ethniki. The two teams remained separate for 4 years, until the summer of 2008 when only one Olympiacos remained in Volos. In 2008, Ethnikos Olympiacos Volos merged with Doxa Drama F.C. in Gamma Ethniki, leaving only A.S.K. Olympiacos in Volos, which participated in Beta Ethniki at the time and was later renamed Olympiacos Volos 1937 FC.

=== Champions and promotion after 20 years to the top league, European journey and "Koriopolis" scandal ===
Olympiacos finally became champion of Beta Ethniki two years later, in the 2009–2010 season, and returned to the top league after an absence of 20 years. The club had a good first season and finished 5th. Therefore Olympiacos qualified for the Europa League for the first time in their history, becoming the first team from the city of Volos to ever take part in a European competition. The team eliminated FK Rad and FC Differdange 03 and was drawn with Paris Saint-Germain F.C. at the play offs. However on 28 July 2011, Olympiacos Volos was relegated to the Football League due to the ongoing match fixing scandal in Greece. They were also excluded from the 2011–12 UEFA Europa League play-off round. Olympiacos Volos successfully appealed their expulsion from the Super League, allowing them to remain in the Super League albeit starting with a 10-point deduction. However, on 23 August 2011, the Greek Professional Sports Committee (EEA) stripped both Kavala and Olympiacos of their professional licence and demoted them to the amateur Delta Ethniki. This decision caused heavy riots in the city of Volos, between the fans of Olympiacos Volos and the police.

Unlike Kavala, which accepted participation in 2011–12 Delta Ethniki, Olympiacos Volos did not, waiting for a decision on their appeal against the EEA. They claimed the EEA's decision had been a violation of the self-administration of football, and on 4 November 2011 they appealed to the Court of Arbitration for Sport in Lausanne. The club remained inactive, and most of they players moved on to other teams. On 7 June 2012, EEA approved a new share transfer during a session held for this purpose, approving the transfer of shares accounting for 58.11% of PAE Olympiacos Volos to Panagiotis Botsivalis, and, thus allowing the team to participate in Greek professional leagues. After a unique decision of the Hellenic Football Federation, Olympiacos Volos participated in the Football League (Greece).

== Honours ==
=== Domestic ===
- Second Division
  - Winners (3): 1966–67, 1970–71, 2009–10
  - Runners-up (5): 1968–69, 1977–78, 1978–79, 1981–82, 1987–88
- Third Division
  - Winners (2): 1998–99, 2018–19 (Group 4)
  - Runners-up (1): 1985–86
- Fourth Division
  - Winners (1): 2006–07

=== Regional ===
- Thessaly FCA Championship
  - Winners (6): 1938–39, 1939–40, 1946–47, 1951–52, 1954–55, 2023–24
- Thessaly FCA Cup
  - Winners (5): 2003–04, 2006–07, 2018–19, 2023–24, 2025–26

== Remarkable achievements ==
=== League achievements ===
- Panhellenic Championship/Super League
  - Fifth place (2): 1954–55, 2010–11

=== Cup achievements ===
- Greek Cup
  - Semi-finalists (1): 2010–11
  - Quarter-Finalists (6): 1939–40, 1954–55, 1970–71, 1984–85, 1989–90, 2013–14

== Seasons in the 21st century ==
Season	Category	Position	Cup
2000–01	Beta Ethniki (2nd division)	7th	GS
2001–02	Beta Ethniki (2nd division)	8th	GS
2002–03	Beta Ethniki (2nd division)	13th	2R
2003–04	Delta Ethniki (4th division)	5th	—
2004–05	Delta Ethniki (4th division)	12th	—
2005–06	Delta Ethniki (4th division)	8th	—
2006–07	Delta Ethniki (4th division)	**1st**	—
2007–08	Gamma Ethniki (3rd division)	4th	4R
2008–09	Beta Ethniki (2nd division)	11th	2R
2009–10	Beta Ethniki (2nd division)	**1st**	5R
2010–11	Super League (1st division)	5th	SF
2011–12	Delta Ethniki (4th division)	—	—
2012–13	Football League (2nd Division)	5th	4R
2013–14	Football League (2nd division)	3rd	QF
2014–15	Football League (2nd division)	5th	GS
2015–16	Football League (2nd division)	17th	GS
2016–17	Gamma Ethniki (3rd division)	3rd	—
2017–18	Gamma Ethniki (3rd division)	5th	—
2018–19	Gamma Ethniki (3rd division)	**1st**	—
2019–20	Football League (3rd Division)	8th	5R
2020–21	Football League (3rd Division)	4th	Cancelled
2021–22	Super League 2 (2nd Division)	15th	3R
2022–23	Gamma Ethniki (3rd division)	13th	—
2023–24	Thessaly FCA First Division	**1st**	—
2024–25	Gamma Ethniki (3rd division)	13th	2R
2025–26	Thessaly FCA First Division	2nd	—
2026–27	Thessaly FCA First Division		—

Best position in bold.

Key: 1R = First Round, 2R = Second Round, 3R = Third Round, 4R = Fourth Round, 5R = Fifth Round, GS = Group Stage, QF = Quarter-finals, SF = Semi-finals.

== European Cup history ==
Despite playing only a few months in Europe, Olympiacos Volos managed to secure some notable records. The team played 4 matches without a single loss (3 wins/1 draw) becoming the only Greek team without a loss in Europe till today. Furthermore, on 28/07/2011 Ilias Solakis scored the last goal in a 3-0 away win against FC Differdange 03 becoming the oldest Greek scorer ever in a European competition at the age of 36 years and 6 months. That was a record previously held by AEK legend Mimis Papaioannou who had managed to score at the age of 36 years and 2 months, back in 1980.

- Q = Qualifying
- PO = Play-off

Season	Competition	Round	Club	Home	Away
2011–12	UEFA Europa League	Q2	(Serbia) Rad	1–1	1–0
2011–12	UEFA Europa League	Q3	(Luxembourg) Differdange 03	3–0	3–0
2011–12	UEFA Europa League	PO	(France) PSG	Excluded due to match-fixing accusations	

== Facilities ==
From the early years until 1962, Olympiacos Volos was playing in the field of Volos shooting club, near the river of Anavros. The club tried to buy this area without success.

In 1962 the club moved to EAK Volos which has a capacity of 9,000 spectators. In 2010–11 season, Olympiacos Volos moved to Panthessaliko Stadium which has a capacity of 22,700 seats. In 2013–14 season, Olympiacos Volos returned to EAK Volos. The club finally decided to use the stadium once again. This stadium has been identified as the club's true home.

The club owned a training football ground in Alli Meria Volos which was confiscated by the state due to debts. Today, relieved from the past's debts and thanks to new property, constructed a new training center in Volos' suburb of Aisonia.

== Rivalries ==
Olympiacos has a long-standing rivalry with Niki Volos, a club based in Nea Ionia. Volos derby is considered to be amongst the top 5 local derbies in Greece.
