= Niki Volos B.C. =

Niki Volos
- Nickname: Κυανόλευκοι (The Blue-Whites)
- Leagues: Greek Elite League; Greek Cup
- Founded: 1954; 72 years ago
- Arena: Nea Ionia Indoor Hall
- Capacity: 1,500
- Location: Nea Ionia, Magnesia, Greece
- Team colors: Blue and White
- President: Giorgos Takis
- Head coach: Stefanos Tympas
- Website: nikivolou.gr
| Home | Away |

Niki Volos B.C. (Greek: Νίκη Βόλου) is a Greek basketball club that is located of Nea Ionia, in Magnesia. Created in 1954, it is a part of the Niki Volos multi sports club. The club's full name is Gymnastic Club Niki Volos (Γυμναστικός Σύλλογος Νίκη Βόλου).

== History ==
=== Foundation of the department ===
The basketball department of Niki Volos took its first steps unofficially in 1951, when Pantelis Magoulas was the president. Historical memory has remained of the matches that the sailors of the American Fleet ships that were stranded in Volos played with the team's players. In 1957 the Nea Ionia club won its first championship in the region of Thessaly, even participating in the finals of the Pan-Provincial Championship, where it was eliminated by Ethnikos Piraeus. From 1957 to 1963, Niki won the Volos championship without fail. In 1972–73 season, it competed for the first time in the First National League, but in a total of 26 games it achieved the same number of defeats and no wins and was immediately relegated.

=== The 1980s and 1990s ===
In 1983–84 season, the Magnesia team won the 2nd National Category Championship, advancing to the 1st National. There, they competed for one year, the 1984–85, during which it recorded 4 wins and 22 losses, resulting in it finishing last and being relegated.

After successive relegations, the club returned to its home local league, winning the A Division trophy of the ESKATH in 1986–87.

In the following decade, the club enriched his trophy cabinet with three 3rd National Category Championships: the 1988–89, according to the system of the time, he won the Thessaly & Midwestern Macedonia Group, however losing the title of Super Champion North to Apollon Kalamarias. The top position in its group in the 3rd National Category was also achieved by the club in the years 1993–94 and 1995–96.

=== Declining course (1999–2005) ===
The turn of the millennium found the club competing in the Third National League, occupying the 1999–00 8th place in the final standings of its group. Its course in the following season (2000–01) was clearly better, as it finished its season in 3rd place. At the end of the 2001–02 Men's Third National Basketball Championship season, it was only one place lower.

The 2002–03 Men's Third National Basketball Championship season saw the club finish in 5th place, while the following 2003–04 Men's Third National Basketball Championship season saw the club's performance decline, as finished 10th. Finally, in the 2004–05 season, Niki Volos collected 9 wins and 17 losses, resulting in relegation to the local championship.

=== Remaining in the 3rd Division (2006–2010) ===
The team returned to the national categories in the 2006–07 Men's National Basketball Championship, a year in which he was ranked 7th. The following year, 2007–08, he showed improved performance, taking 3rd place. During the 2008–09 season, he was in 10th place in the final standings, while during the 2008–09 season, he was in 10th place in the final standings and 2009–10 season he was in 3rd place.

=== Upward march to the A2 National League (2010–2012) ===
During the season, 2010–11, Niki Volos participated in the 3rd National Category. Achieving 22 wins and 4 losses, they emerged as Champion of the 1st Group North, receiving the promotion ticket to the 2nd National Category. The following year, 2011–12, was equally successful as, occupying the 4th place in the final standings in combination with the inability to participate in the Maroussi B.C., led Niki to the A2 League. In the organization of the Greek Cup, it was eliminated in the premiere by Panelefsiniakos B.C. with a score of 68-73. Also, during the same period, it achieved the largest victory in its history, against Iraklis, with a score of 26-106, in Ivanofeio Sports Arena.

=== A new period of decline (2012–2019) ===
The Volos team ultimately failed to establish itself as a rising force, remaining in the A2 National League only for the 2012–13 period. Having collected 7 wins and 19 losses, they completed their competitive obligations in 12th place in the standings, with immediate consequences of relegation. As for the Cup, the club was eliminated during the 1st Match of the First Phase by Ikaros Serres with a score of 95-97. From the 2013–14 season, a competitive decline began, with Niki achieving two consecutive relegations, ending in the local ESKATH championship in the 2015–16 season. In the summer of 2015, Babis Toutoutzoglou took over as president. In the 2016–17 season, it won the ESKATH championship and returned to the national categories. In the next season, it achieved 3rd place in the 3rd group of the 3rd National League and was led to the promotion play-offs where it will face A.O. Polygyros, whom they will defeat with 74-73 and will be promoted to the 2nd National League. Unfortunately, Niki's presence in the 2nd National League did not last long, as in the 2018–19 season they finished in 13th place and returned to the 3rd National League.

=== Upward and steady course but also administrative reshuffles (2019–2023) ===
In the 2019–20 season the championship was interrupted due to a pandemic, with Niki finishing in 2nd place and returning solemnly to the 2nd National League, where they compete to this day. In 2022, financier Babis Toutoutzoglou leaves after 7 years and is succeeded by businessman Christos Kallipolitis, who in turn leaves in November 2022.

=== Administrative calm and return to A2 (2023–present) ===
In December 2023, Giorgos Takis takes over as president, who continues to this day. In the 2023–24 season, he played relegation play-off matches with Proteas Grevena, which he defeated, managing to remain in the category.

In the 2024–25 season, despite missing out on promotion by participating in the playoffs, they finally won it and returned to A2 after 12 years, via wild card.

== Arena ==
The club plays its home games at the 1,500 seat Nea Ionia Indoor Hall.

== Honors ==
- Greek 2nd Division
  - Winners (1): 1983–84
- Greek 4th Division
  - Winners (2): 1988–89, 1993–94, 1995–96, 2010–11
- Provincial Championship
  - Winners (2): 1972, 1987
- ESKATH Championship
  - Winners (2): 1986–87, 2016–17
- Thessaly Championship
  - Winners (7): 1965–66, 1966–67, 1967–68, 1968–69, 1969–70, 1970–71, 1971–72
- Volos Championship
  - Winners (9): 1954–55, 1955–56, 1956–57, 1957–58, 1958–59, 1959–60, 1960–61, 1961–62, 1962–63

== Notable players ==
- (Greece) Georgios Kalaitzis
- (Greece) Thodoris Karamanolis
- (Greece) Dimitris Bogdanos
- (Greece) Stavros Vafeiadis
- (Greece) Evangelos Tilelis
- (Greece) Michalis Spiliotis
- (Greece) Spyros Tsochas
- (Greece) Stefanos Papachronis
- (Greece) Makis Kesemidis
- (Greece) Nikolaos Miamis
- (Greece) Giorgos Kontakis
- (Greece) Kostas Kileriotis
- (Greece) Giorgos Katsalis
