= Niki Volos F.C. =

Association football club in Greece

Niki Volos
- Full name: Niki Volos Football Club
- Nickname: Κυανόλευκοι (The Blue-Whites)
- Founded: 19 August 1924; 102 years ago (as Gymnastic Club of Volos' Refugees)
- Ground: Pantelis Magoulas Stadium
- Capacity: 2,500
- Owner: Alexis Papakonstantinou
- Chairman: Nikos Papakonstantinou
- Manager: Alekos Vosniadis
- League: Super League Greece 2
- 2025–26: Super League Greece 2 (North Group), 2nd
- Website: nikifc.gr
Home colours	Away colours	Third colours

Niki Volos Football Club (Greek: ΠΑΕ Νίκη Βόλου) is a Greek professional football club based in the city of Volos, in the region of Magnesia, Greece. The club currently competes in the Super League 2, the second tier of Greek football.

== History ==
=== 1920s ===
The football team was created on 19 August 1924, as the first department of the G.S. Niki Volos.

The first football match of Niki Volos was held on 26 July 1925 at King George I Square against HANTH, which it defeated with a score of 4–0.

In 1928, the team acquired a privately owned stadium in N. Ionia, the "Cage" as it was called and was not forced to compete in the park of Agios Konstantinos in Volos. It was established there in 1930.

=== 1930s ===
In this decade, the new team named "Niki Volos" unites the entire refugee community of Nea Ionia. The Niki team and its competitive course express their own struggle for survival and recognition. In this decade, Niki completely prevails in the Thessaly area with the team of adults – not men – because most of them were children without a mustache. On 30 March 1930 it plays its first friendly match with a team outside the province, specifically with PAOK, in which it was defeated with a score of 1–2, and on Easter Day it was defeated again, this time by Thermaikos Thessaloniki with a score of 4–2. On 13 July of the same year, they defeated Iraklis in a friendly match with a score of 1–0, making it a huge success for the time.

In the first EPSTH championship of the 1930–31 period, they finished in 2nd place, having a remarkable potential. On 30 August 1931, they drew a friendly with Aris with a score of 2–2, a result which was then considered successful for Volos football.

In 1932, Niki became the first team to bring in a coach from abroad, the Hungarian Marvey. At the end of April, they defeated the Larissa Excursionists' Club in Larissa with a score of 5–2. On 29 May 1932 it was defeated in a friendly match by 4–2 by Megas Alexandros Thessalonikis. In 1933 it won the championship and the Volos cup. In fact, in the same year on 16 July, participating in the opening of the Thessalian football championship, it marched first with Pantelidis as the flag bearer. A historic friendly match with Aris Thessalonikis is recorded at that time, at the Nea Ionia stadium, which ended 1–1.

On 18 April 1937 the first official match was played against the newly founded Olympiacos Volos. Niki was defeated by 2–1 in a game witnessed by a large, passionate crowd.

On 8 May 1938 they defeated Odysseas with a score of 6–1 and won the Volos championship. A few days later they crushed the Trikala team with a score of 11–0 and won the Thessaly championship. In 1939 they defeated Olympiacos with a score of 4–1 and won the Thessaly cup. On 7 January of the same year, Panathinaikos came to Volos and Niki lost with a score of 1–3.

In the 1939–40 season, Niki finished in 4th and last place and had a relegation match with the champion of the 2nd division, Kentavros Volos, whom they won with difficulty with a score of 4–3 and remained in the division.

=== 1940s ===
Amid the hardships of war, football was a means of relaxation, whenever circumstances allowed. During the period 1940–1944, only friendly matches were held between Thessalian teams, characterized by a large attendance of spectators. In fact, a friendly match at the Nea Ionia stadium on 1 August 1943 between Aris Larissa and Niki Volos with a score of 3–2 in favor of Aris, was attended by 10,000 spectators. During this period, the Niki team mourned the loss of some of its outstanding athletes during the war, while several had been members of the National Resistance. After the war, the team was reorganized under the guidance of Pantelis Magoulas, playing matches against the English Allied forces, mainly for economic reasons but also for technical reasons.

On 15 April 1945 Niki played a friendly match with an English army team and won with a score of 5–0 while leading at half-time with 3–0. In 1946 Niki won the Thessalian championship by defeating Olympiacos Volos with 8–1 and Pagasitikos with 3–1, while on 22 May 1947 they played in the semi-final of the Greek Football Cup against Iraklis Thessaloniki. The transfer to Thessaloniki was by sea on a 36-hour journey by boat as the movement by land was dangerous due to the civil war. In this match they were defeated with a score of 3–0. In the years 1948, 1949 and 1950 Niki emerged as the champion of Thessaly.

=== 1950s ===
During this decade, Niki witnessed substantial improvement in performance. Despite various difficulties that the players faced, such as the lack of work and nutrition, they nevertheless were able to achieve notable progress.

At the end of May 1950 Niki emerged as the champion of Volos and in June of the same year as the champion of Thessaly, defeating Iraklis Larissa in two matches with a score of 0–1 in the first match and 3–1 in the second. Then strong friendly matches followed for Niki. In the first, Niki played against Ethnikos Piraeus, which they won with a score of 3–2. Then it plays two friendlies with the 73rd brigade of the DSE in which it wins with scores of 1–0 and 8–2 respectively. The friendlies continue in Thessaloniki playing with Makedonikos, winning with 2–0. Back in Volos, Nikis plays two friendlies with the two Athenian teams, AEK and Panionios. It plays with the first on 13 July and loses with 5–1 and with the second it plays with 26 July and wins with 4–2. On 3 November in the rematch of the first game of the Greek Football Cup which ended 4–4, Niki eliminated Anagennisi Karditsas with a score of 3–0 and qualified for the next phase, in which it met fellow city-state Olympiacos, from which it was eliminated with a score of 1–0.

On 27 May 1951 and after a match against Olympiacos Volos, which it won with a score of 5–2, it was declared champion of Volos again. On 15 July of the same year, it emerged champion of Thessaly, defeating Iraklis Larissa with a score of 4–2. That year, a joint carnival dance was held between Niki and Olympiacos Volos, unique in historical terms. At the same time, on 17 June 1951, in the presence of at least 5,000 fans, it plays a friendly match with the champion Olympiakos Piraeus and is defeated 1–3, despite leading the score with Vafeiadis.

With the start of the preparation for the 1952–53 season, Niki plays a friendly match with the team of the 1st Army Corps and draws 2–2. On 15 May 1953 it is declared the champion of Volos, defeating Olympiakos 4–3, despite initially losing 0–3. Then follow the matches of the Thessaly championship, Niki will play matches with Aris Larissa. In the 1st match it will win 4–0, while in the 2nd it will lose 1–0. Finally, on 21 June 1953, they were crowned champions of Thessaly again after winning the third match against Aris Larissas, which they defeated 4–0. A friendly match between Niki and Panionios followed on 29 June in which the two teams drew 2–2, while on 11 October a new friendly match was held with the then-powerful Aris Thessaloniki with the same result (2–2).

The 1953–54 season is the most successful for Niki in this decade as on New Year's Day of 1954 they will defeat Iraklis Larissa at the Alcazar Stadium with a score of 3–1 in a match held for the final phase of the Thessalian championship and in the replay that took place 2 days later Niki beat Iraklis again with a score of 2–1 and is declared champion of Thessaly and gets the ticket for the qualifiers of the Panhellenic championship in which they will face Doxa Drama which they defeat in Volos with a score of 4–0 on 31 January 1954, while a few days later, on 14 February they lose in Drama with a score of 4–2. Thus, the two teams are led to a play-off match held on 8 March 1954 in which the Niki team wins 3–1 and together with Panachaiki is one of the provincial teams that for the first time with teams from Athens and Thessaloniki.

In the panhellenic championship Niki Volos made a satisfactory progress as it finishes in 5th place and takes the informal title of the best provincial team. Notable results for that period are the 1–2 against PAOK in Thessaloniki at the start of the mini-championship, the 2–2 in Volos again with PAOK and the 0–0 with AEK Athens in Volos.

On 2 January 1955 Niki hosts Asteras Athens and wins 3–0. A week later it hosts Pallamiaki and wins 4–1. On 6 March it defeats Iraklis with a score of 2–1, in a match for the Greek Football Cup and qualifies for the next phase in which it will be eliminated by fellow city-mate Aris with a score 2–1.

1956 started for Niki by facing Larisaikos at the Nea Ionia stadium. The result was 5–2 in favor of the home team. On 8 January they will defeat Larisaikos again by 2–0 this time in Larissa while two days later they will defeat Achilleas Trikalon by 1–0 and win the Thessaly championship and at the same time get the ticket for the qualifications for the final phase of the Panhellenic championship for the 2nd time in its history. In the qualifiers, Niki Volos faced Panathinaikos, Apollon Athens, Olympiakos Chalkida and Fostiras. Ultimately, Niki finishes in 3rd place in the Central Group of the 2nd qualifying phase. A notable result for that period is the 0–0 that Niki achieved away from home against Panathinaikos on 15 January 1956, having a very good performance throughout the match, forcing the Athens team to its first loss of points. In the Greek Cup, Niki Volos with a satisfactory performance eliminated the then powerful Ethnikos Piraeus with a wide 5–0. In the next phase, however, it was eliminated by fellow countryman Olympiakos Piraeus with a score of 4–0 in Nea Smyrni. In June 1956, the Niki team departed for Northern Greece for a series of friendly matches, the first of which was against Doxa Dramas, from which it lost 2–0, while in the next match it beat Iraklis Serres 3–1. On 3 July it will compete with Proodeftiki, from which it was defeated 3–1.

On Thursday 13 December 1956, with 1,000 fans on their side in Larissa, Niki again defeated Iraklis Larissa 4–1 and emerged as the champion team of Thessaly for the second time. The matches for the Northern Greece champion began on 23 December. Niki in Alexandroupolis defeated the local Ethnikos 3–1, while three days later they faced Doxa Drama and were defeated 1–0.

1957 begins with Niki facing Ethnikos Alexandroupolis and defeating them with a wide score of 9–0. A few days later, on 6 January, they drew 0–0 against Doxa Dramas and failed to reach the final stage of the Panhellenic Championship. On 13 January of the same year, they were defeated by Spartak Trnava with a score of 1–3 and on 3 February they defeated Austria Graz in a friendly match with 2–0, winning the admiration of their opponents. On 16 February 1958 they beat Olympiacos Volos with 6–1 in front of 5,000 fans in a game that was momentarily interrupted because Archbishop Makarios entered the field during the game and blessed the crowds cheering him on. Niki's good competitive condition would be proven in its next match, on 23 February, when it would beat Aris Thessaloniki at its stadium with 1–0 with a goal by Zanteroglou. The same year it won the championship and qualified for the qualifying phase of the Panhellenic championship in which it did not win a single game. After this failure, Niki hired a new coach, Tzamtzis. In the 1958–59 season it emerged as Volos champion and qualified for the Thessalian Championship phase. Niki started successfully by beating the local team of Aris in Larissa with 1–0. However, in the next match in Trikala, Niki was defeated by the very good team of Achilleas Trikala with 1–0, which won both the championship and the entry into the final phase of the 1959 panhellenic championship. On 13 November 1958 Niki played a friendly match with the National Armed Forces and won 4–3. 1958 closes for the Niki team with a heavy score of 5–2 from the Yugoslav team Beogradski in a friendly match they played.

On 26 April 1959 Niki eliminated Aris with a score of 1–0, while on 25 May it was narrowly eliminated by Panionios in Athens with a score of 2–1. In the 1959–60 season, it was again declared champion of Volos and Thessaly in a special match against Achilleas Trikala, winning 2–1 in a packed Niki stadium with 7,000 spectators from all over Thessaly. In the same year, the Greek Football Association awarded it a Cup at the request of the Athens sports newspaper "OMADA". During this decade, Niki Volos and Doxa Drama were the only teams to play in the province.

=== 1960s ===
At the beginning of this decade, the Niki team made the big leap and rose to the A' National Division, remaining there until 1966 despite any adverse conditions. An honorary page for Niki during this period is the participation of D. Kokkinakis, Chr. Zanteroglou and N. Tzinis in the Greek National Team. On 5 March 1961, Niki played the crucial match against Olympiacos Kozani in its stadium in the presence of 7,000 spectators, which ended 1–1. However, the victory of the Larisaikos team over the Kozani team gave another opportunity to Niki, which on 14 May 1961 got a valuable draw in the replay against Olympiacos Kozani with 1–1 with 3,000 fans following the team. In the qualifying matches against Aspida Xanthi (4–0 in favor of Niki and 0–0), Panelefsiniakos (1–0 in favor of Panelefsiniakos and 3–0 in favor of Niki) and Egaleo (2–1 in favor of Egaleo and 4–1 in favor of Niki) the team ranked first and was promoted to the First National League. That year Niki achieved a national goal record by scoring 125 goals.

In the first two seasons of Niki in the First National League (1961–62 & 1962–63) Niki remained relatively easy in the division, remaining almost undefeated in games against the "greats" of Greek football at its home ground, the so-called "club". Notable results are the victory over AEK Athens with 2–1, the 0–0 with PAOK, the 2–2 with Panathinaikos, a match that deprived the championship of the Greens, as it experienced the equalizer from Niki in the 89th minute, the 0–0 with AEK Athens but also the big victory for the second time away from home over PAOK with 0–2 inside Kleanthis Vikelidis Stadium.

In the 1963–64 season the team is in danger of being relegated to the 2nd National League. On 14 June 1964, they played a qualifying match against Olympiakos Chalkida in Lamia (1–1) and managed to remain in the First Division. At that time, although Niki was in danger of being relegated, they achieved remarkable results in the "club" (1–0 against PAOK, 2–2 against AEK Athens and 1–1 against the undefeated champion Panathinaikos, although Niki took the lead in the 21st minute, the Athenian team equalized in the 25th minute). At the same time, in a friendly match at the end of August 1964, Niki beat PAOK with a score of 2–1. On 28 October of the same year, a friendly match is held between Niki and the undefeated champion Panathinaikos, on the occasion of the 40th anniversary of the founding of the Volos team, with a final score of 2–1 for Niki.

In the 1964–65 season, the team made a mediocre run and remained in the division, achieving results such as a 0–0 draw against AEK and a 1–0 victory over PAOK. On 13 May 1965, they defeated Olympiacos Volos in a friendly match with a wide score of 11–1, which remains the largest between the two teams. On 27 June, although Niki was 1–0 ahead of Panathinaikos, the match was interrupted due to incidents caused by Panathinaikos officials and players. However, the match was repeated on 19 September 1965. The result is a draw (0–0) and the team plays a play-off with Panegialios (2–1) and Apollon Kalamarias (1–0) and remains in the First Division. That season it also makes an amazing run in the Greek Cup, reaching the semi-finals for the second time in its history, facing Olympiakos Piraeus, to which it is defeated with a score of 4–0. To reach the semi-finals it also managed to eliminate Aris with a score of 2–1 in extra time.

In the 1965–66 season, the team was relegated to the Second National League despite having some notable and important players. A notable result of that year and of the division was Niki's 1–0 victory over Olympiakos Piraeus on 24 April 1966 with an own goal by Plessas. This match was played at the Volos Municipal Stadium in front of 11,228 fans, a record number of tickets for Niki's team in its five years in the First National League.

The next season had a moderate to good run and finished in 8th place in the standings, with 70 points. Then the proposal was made to change the name to "Ionian" and create the subgroup "Volos Athletic Club" (merger with Olympiacos Volos) which, however, did not have a majority. In the 1967–68 season, the team finished in the middle of the standings for the Second National League. The 1969 had a good run and impressive away appearances.

In the middle of the 1969–70 season, the Niki team dreams of returning to the First National League, but the federation discovered an attempted bribery in the match against Panelefsiniakos. This resulted in the team losing all of the remaining matches until the end of the season and deducting 8 points, almost saving the division.

=== 1970s ===
In the 1970–71 season, Niki had a poor run in the 2nd National League, narrowly escaping relegation due to a change in the league schedule at the end of the season. Disappointment and bitterness prevailed, with fans holding the team's management responsible, who resigned. Nevertheless, in the competitive part of the match for the Greek Cup against AEL, the team qualified 3–1 with substitute goalkeeper Vogiatzis saving 4 out of 5 penalties. In the 1971–72 season, Niki finished in 12th place in the Second Group, while in the 1972–73 season, Niki finished 14th out of 20 teams and was saved only in the last matchday In the 1973–74 season, Niki celebrated its 50th anniversary with the team's performance being almost the same, finishing in the middle of Group C.

In the 1974–75 season, Niki was relegated after 15 years of presence in the national categories to the local championship and the following year finished in 1st place being undefeated. On 16 June 1976 they won the Greek Amateur Cup after defeating PAO Rouf in Lamia with 2–1. After playoff matches in Kriekouki, Chios and Kalamata they managed to climb back up to the Second National League. The following year, it finished in the middle of the Beta Ethniki standings, defeating Veria in the last match with 3–2. In 1978, the team's performance was mediocre. The team finished in the middle of the standings.

On 11 November 1979 thirty buses followed Niki to Serres for the match with the leader in the standings Panserraikos, with Niki following in 2nd place. The match ended 4–1 in favor of the Serres team. A few days later, on December 5 of the same year, they achieved a significant friendly victory over AEK with a score of 2–0. This decade ended with Niki Volos seriously flirting with the First Division as it finished 2nd in the 1979–80 in the Beta Ethniki championship, 12 points behind first place.

=== 1980s ===
During this decade, Niki's good run continued without being able to climb to the First National League, while the following year its performance dropped and it finished in the middle of the standings. During this period, several administrative problems appeared with the resignation of the chairman of the board of directors.

The 1983 in an attempt to recover, special emphasis was given to the "youth" team. That year, on 19 July 1983, the team played a play-off match for the stay, against Aiolikos Mytilene at the Leoforos Alexandras Stadium, in the presence of 25,000 spectators, with Niki prevailing after the final 2–2 in the penalty shootout and remaining in the Second National League. The 1984 is a very bad year for Niki. The team's morale is very low and its performance is not satisfactory. During this period, fatal decisions are made for the team as the 2-group system in the 2nd National League ceases to exist with the simultaneous reduction of teams to 20, resulting in the team being in the 3rd National League.

The 1985 finds the team in the Northern Group of the 3rd National League. Its competitive performance is characterized as average to good, especially in the last games while the management promotes young players to the team. The 1986, despite its good performance, is ranked 3rd in its category. On 26 January 1986 a match was played between Niki Volos and Olympiacos Volos with the two teams tied for first place in the standings, with the final score 2–0 and the presence of over 10,000 fans. In the 1986–87 Niki Volos finished 3rd and missed promotion to the 2nd National League by just 1 point. However, it achieved this the following year by winning 2nd place.

The 1989 managed to remain in the 2nd National League with the administrative factors emphasizing the need for greater support from the public. This decade ended unsuccessfully as the team was relegated to the 3rd National League after a poor run that did not change despite successive changes of coaches.

=== 1990s ===
The last decade of the century finds the team in the Third Division. On 19 June 1991 the team plays a relegation play-off match in Karditsa against Lamia in the presence of thousands of fans, Niki wins 3–1 on penalties and remains in the Gamma Ethniki.

The following year (1991–92) is one of the worst in Niki's history as they are relegated to the Fourth Division. This year was marked by financial problems and more, which resulted in the resignation of the board of directors in the middle of the period. In 1993, Niki won the return to the 3rd National Football League, scoring an average of 3 goals per match. The good course continued in the 1994, which found Niki Volos the Winter champion, but without having the corresponding continuity, as a result of which it did not succeed and was ranked 3rd in the Northern Group of the 3rd National Football League.

In the 1994–95 season, the team finished in 9th place in the final ranking, despite having a satisfactory presence in many matches. The 4–0 victory over the champion Kastoria is characteristic. In the 1996, Niki, under the guidance of Horacio Moráles, returns to the Second National League, winning first place in its group. It is the year that, by law, the team becomes a football public limited company. In the 1996–97 season, Niki begins to dream of the glory of the past after occupying 6th place (with a difference of 9 points from 3rd place) in the Second National League standings with Paflias emerging as the top scorer in the category.

In the 1997–98 season, it once again revives the hopes of the fans by finishing in 5th place with enough hopes for promotion to the First National League. In the 1998–99 season, it took 17th place and was relegated to the 3rd National Football League, due to administrative and financial problems. In the 1999–00 season, Niki finished in 13th place and tied with the Neapoli Thessaloniki team and played a play-off match at the Nea Smyrni stadium, which it won 2–4 and prepared for play-off matches for the stay with Leonidio Arcadia, in which Niki lost 2 away matches and was relegated to the 4th National Football League and the team returned to amateur club.

=== 2000s ===
The new millennium finds the Niki team in the Delta Ethniki. In 2001 finishes in 3rd place while the 2002 manages to return to the Gamma Ethniki by winning 1st place in its group. The 2003 finishes 4th and secures its return to the Beta Ethniki, filling the gap created by fellow Greek team Olympiacos.

In the 2003–04 season, the team finished in 6th place with 49 points. A notable result of that year for the fans is the game against Panserraikos in November 2003, as the Niki team was winning 3–0 at half-time and the final result was 3–3. In the 2004–05 season, the team made an amazing progress and in 2005 it found itself as the winter champion, but some unfortunate results brought it to 4th place, missing the promotion by 2 points.

In the 2005–06 season, the team finished in about 10th place in the standings, making a mediocre run compared to the previous two. In fact, in December 2005, the team achieved a great victory for the Greek Cup, eliminating Ionikos with a score of 1–4 away from home, with Saitiotis scoring 3 goals and the team's midfield glorifying the team. That year, Niki reached the Quarterfinals of the tournament.

The 2006–07 season was the team's most disappointing, as it finished in 18th place and was relegated to the Gamma Ethniki, due to many problems during the summer. He will remain there until the end of this decade, presenting a mediocre competitive face and with many and intense administrative and financial problems.

=== 2010s ===
This decade can be described as one of the most turbulent and emotionally mixed in the history of Niki Volos. The period 2010–2012 finds the team in the Gamma Ethniki. The 2011 finished in 11th place in a disappointing year while the 2012 took 2nd place which led them to the promotion play-offs where they achieved promotion and returned to the Football League.

The 2012–13 season finds the team in the Football League, with a strong team with several experienced players and with the team once again using the Panthessaliko Stadium as its home ground. Having made a good run, it manages to enter the Play-offs for promotion to the Super League, but without being able to make the breakthrough.

The 2013–14 season was the year that the team celebrated its 90th anniversary, so the goal could not be other than promotion. The team with Panagiotis Tzanavaras at the helm started the championship impressively, playing football of rare beauty. In August 2013, shortly before the start of the championship, Niki achieved a historic victory over AEK with a score of 3–1, in a friendly match for the 90th anniversary of the founding of Niki. The year starts positively for Niki with two consecutive victories over Doxa Drama away with 2-0 and over Tyrnavos at home again with 2-0. The change of coach, before half of the championship, seemed to affect the team. However, the arrival of Alekos Vosniadis, who had been crowned Football League champion the previous year with Apollon Smyrnis, gave the players the air of champions. The end of the regular season of the championship finds the team in the promotion Play-offs for another year. The bad start with the home defeat to Aiginiakos scattered disappointment among the fans, but the next matchday, on 13 April 2014, came the victory at Volos Municipal Stadium against Olympiacos Volos, reviving everyone's hopes. With impressive performances and amazing away performances, Niki managed to mathematically secure promotion to the Super League. In the last match of the Play-offs, Niki welcomed Iraklis at Panthessaliko and 13,000 people created a hot atmosphere to celebrate the team's promotion and saw the team win 4–0. However, the results of this matchday brought a reversal in the Standings and thus Niki not only won the promotion but also won the title of the Football League Champion 2013–14. The final whistle brought wild celebrations with people filling the streets of the city to celebrate this historic success.

The following year, Niki found itself in the Super League, having to deal with the problem of non-licensing and transfer restrictions. That year, a young team was introduced under the guidance of Dutch coach Willian Flout, making their debut at the Karaiskakis Stadium against Olympiacos. After 15 matches and under the weight of financial problems, the team withdrew from the championship with 2 wins, 1 draw and 12 losses.

The 2015–16 season began with the team participating in the Gamma Ethniki championship and at the same time returning to the Pantelis Magoulas Stadium. That year, they achieved 3rd place in the 2nd Group, a position that did not guarantee them promotion to the next division. In the summer of 2016, the team was taken over by businessman and banking and insurance consultant Sakis Tzimas, who left in July 2017. During his tenure, in the 2016–17 season, they achieved 6th place in the standings with a mediocre performance. In the 2017–18 season, they achieved a good performance, but finished 2nd with a difference of 17 points from the first, thus losing their entry into the play-off groups for promotion to the Football League.

The 2018–19 season is one of the most subversive, but also one of the best years of Niki in the 3rd National League since it collected a harvest of 69 points, 23 wins, 2 draws and one defeat, managing to make a difference and to prevail by a large margin in goals. The championship started with Niki showing positive signs, but the draw with AO Sellana threw it into second place, where it remained until December 2018. However, what gave optimism to the fans for something better, is the match with the Stylida team on 20 January 2019 with a record score of 8–0. Since then, they have been on a good run, but lost to Olympiacos Volos on 17 February, and tied for first place, with Olympiacos having the advantage. Thus, they finished in second place in the 4th group and were then defeated in the play-offs between runners-up by the team of Thesprotos. They were promoted, however, to the Football League, filling vacancies that were created in the professional category. The club was prepared for this possibility since the summer and proceeded with the procedures for establishing a Football Company Limited with the distinctive title "P.A.E. Niki Volos 1924».

At the same time, that season he also participated in the group phase of the Greek Football Cup after 3 years, having opponents in the 7th group Xanthi, Kassiopi and OFI. In this group the only match that managed to get points was the one against Xanthi on 19 December 2018, with Niki winning 1–0 with a goal by Tzioras in the 72nd minute. In the group standings, they tied with Kassiopi and missed out on entering the Round of 16 by one point.

In the 2019–20 season, the Niki Volos team finished in 5th place in the Football League standings with 37 points, tied with Ierapetra, after the break due to coronavirus, losing promotion in the tie. In the Greek Cup they were eliminated by Aiolikos Mytilene with 1–0, in a period of mediocre performance for the Niki team.

=== 2020s ===
The new decade finds Niki back in the Football League, having a bad year, finishing 8th in the southern group standings, saving the year in a tie with Asteras Vlachioti at 22 points. Thus, it secured its participation in the new Super League 2 of the 2021–22 season.

In the 2021–22 season, Niki made a satisfactory progress compared to the previous one, as it secured its stay early and finished in 4th place, one point behind 3rd, having a moderate to good presence in the matches. The following season (2022–23) again had a good run and finished in 3rd place in the standings, paying for the bad start it made.

The following season (2023–24) followed the same pattern, with Niki Volos failing to achieve the coveted goal of promotion this year either, falling behind early in the standings, but they managed to enter the playoffs in which they played a regulating role, resulting in finishing in 4th place. Also, that season, it made an amazing run in the Greek Cup, reaching the Quarterfinals after 18 years, where it faced the powerful Aris from which it was eliminated 3–0 in Thessaloniki and 2–2 in Volos, with Niki having a remarkable presence in both matches.

Thus, the team's 100 years are completed having a stable run in the country's second-tier football championship, without anything noteworthy in terms of rankings.

In the 2024–25 season, Niki had a mediocre competitive run, which resulted in its entry into the playoffs in which it was the first of all the playoff teams in the category to secure its stay, finishing in 7th place. In next season (2025–26), Niki finished in 2nd place, missing out on promotion by a few points.

The following season (2025–26) Niki, setting high goals with coach Kostas Georgiadis and the addition of experienced footballers from higher categories such as Giannis Loukinas, Apostolos Vellios, Adam Tzanetopoulos and players who distinguished themselves in the Super League 2 of the previous season such as Pavlos Eppas and Rafail Pettas, claimed promotion to the Super League 1. It finished in second place in the regular season at -5 to Iraklis, tied with Anagennisi Karditsa, but in the playoffs it had a mediocre run losing at home to Iraklis and drawing with Karditsa and Tripoli, remaining at -9 to Iraklis in the third matchday, losing its hopes of promotion. It ultimately finished in second place with 29 points compared to 38 for Iraklis who gained promotion. Niki had the best attack in its group with 46 goals, 16 of which were scored by Giannis Loukinas, who emerged as the top scorer of that season.

== Ownership and financing ==
=== Amateur legal entities ===
Period	Amateur juridical entity	Official name
1924–26	Sporting club	Gymnastikos Syllogos Prosfygon Volou
1926–	Sporting club	Gymnastikos Syllogos Volou "Niki"

=== Professional legal entities ===
Period	Professional juridical entity	Brand name	Distinctive title	Parent sporting club	Sources
1993–96	Salaried football players department	Gymnastikos Syllogos Volou "Niki" Tmima Amivomenon Podosferiston	G.S.V. "Niki" T.A.P.	G.S. Niki Volos	
1996–2000	Football public limited company	Gymnastikos Syllogos Volou "Niki" Podosferiki Athlitiki Anonymi Eteria	G.S. "Niki Volou" P.A.E.	G.S. Niki Volos	
2002–15	Football public limited company	Gymnastikos Syllogos Volou "Niki" Podosferiki Anonymi Eteria	G.S.V. "Niki" P.A.E.	G.S. Niki Volos	
2019–	Football public limited company	Gymnastikos Syllogos Volou "Niki" 1924 Podosferiki Anonymi Eteria	Niki Volou F.C.	G.S. Niki Volos	

=== Owners ===
Period	Nationality	Owner	Football public limited company
1996–99	(Greece)	Giannis Filippou	G.S. "Niki Volou" P.A.E.
1999–2000	(Greece)	Kostas Lazos	G.S. "Niki Volou" P.A.E.
2002–03	(Greece)	Kostas Lazos	G.S.V. "Niki" P.A.E.
2003–05	(Greece)	Charalambos Apostolopoulos	G.S.V. "Niki" P.A.E.
2005–06	(Greece)	Theodoros Tzortzis	G.S.V. "Niki" P.A.E.
2006–08	(Greece)	Petros Kaimakamis	G.S.V. "Niki" P.A.E.
2008–11	(Greece)	Stratos Gidopoulos	G.S.V. "Niki" P.A.E.
2011–12	(Greece)	Georgios Daloukas	G.S.V. "Niki" P.A.E.
2012–15	(Greece)	Andreas Patsis	G.S.V. "Niki" P.A.E.
2019–	(Greece)	Alexis Papakonstantinou	Niki Volou F.C.

=== Presidential history ===
Niki Volos F.C. presidential history from 1924 to present
Prodromos Antonoglou (Aug. 1924, interim); Maurikios Panas (1924–1928); Aggelos Papazoglou (1928–1933); Zararis (1933–1934); Agamemnon Bakoulakis (1934–1935); Pantelis Magoulas (1935–1938); Panagiotis Chatzikonstantinou (1938–1940); Georgios Michailidis (Feb. 1945–Apr. 1945); Georgios Doxopoulos (1945–1946); Pantelis Magoulas (1946–1949); Agamemnon Bakoulakis (Jan. 1949–Oct. 1949); Pantelis Magoulas (1949–1958); Ioannis Amoiroglou (1958–1962); Konstantinos Zoubos (1964–1965); Ioannis Amoiroglou (1965–1966); Apostolos Volidis (1966–1968); Ioannis Amoiroglou (1968–1969); Nikolaos Karaberis (1969–1970); Miltiadis Gialidis (1970–1971); Ioannis Probonas (Jun. 1971–Dec. 1971); Konstantinos Tsopouridis (1971–1972)	Ioannis Amoiroglou (1972–1973); Konstantinos Strapatsas (Feb. 1973–Sep. 1973); Dimitrios Aktsalis (1973–1975); Nikolaos Orfanidis (1975–1977); Markos Skourtis (1977–1978); Miltiadis Gialidis (1978–1982); Konstantinos Strapatsas (1982–1984); Ioannis Katsavrias (Jan. 1984–Jul. 1984); Ioannis Tzanetos (1984–1987); Georgios Tragoudaras (1987–1992); Alexandros Perivolaris (Mar. 1992–Jul. 1992); Michalis Mavrogiannis (1992–1994); Georgios Tsintsinis (1994–1995); Christos Simeonidis (1995–1996); Georgios Xatzivasiliou (Jul. 1996–Aug. 1996); Georgios Bafilias (1996–1997); Dimitrios Tsourveloudis (1997–1998); Konstantinos Taktikos (Feb. 1998–Oct. 1998); Christos Malikiosis (1998–1999); Konstantinos Lazos (1999–2003); Christos Simeonidis (Mar. 2003–Jul 2003)	Konstantinos Moisidis (Jul. 2003–Aug. 2003); Charalambos Apostolopoulos (2003–2006); Konstantinos Chronis (2006–2008); Ioannis Rodopoulos (2008–2009); Dimitrios Ioannidis (2009–2012); Andreas Patsis (2012–2014); Ioannis Xanthis (2014–2015); Vasileios Labrou (2015–2016); Stergios Fatsis (Mar. 2016–Jun. 2016); Athanasios Tzimas (2016–2017); Nikolaos Papakonstantinou (2017–2018); Ajet Imeraj (2018–2019); Stergios Fatsis (Jun. 2019–Sep. 2019); Nikolaos Papakonstantinou (2019–)

== Supporters ==
The club's most famous supporters group is the one consisting of members from "Blue Club", fan club established in 1985, the so-called Indians. The fan club is also recognized as "Blue Club Panagiotis Ntokouzis", named after one of the founding members of the fan club who died in a motorcycle accident. Another club, particularly famous among the majority of Greek ultras, is the "Blue Angels club 1994" established in 1994.

=== Friendships ===
- (Bulgaria) Dunav Ruse
- (Kazakhstan) Astana

=== Notable supporters ===
- Angelos Argyris, footballer, former Niki Volos player
- Dimitris Balafas, footballer and coach, former Niki Volos captain
- Lavrentis Machairitsas, singer
- Dimitrios Kokkinakis, footballer, former Niki Volos player, lifelong fan
- Giannis Paflias, footballer and coach, former Niki Volos captain

== Crest and colours ==
Niki Volos crest displays the goddess Nike as depicted in the statue Nike of Paionios. The image of the goddess was the original emblem of the Smyrna-based athletic club Panionios, one of the most popular Greek athletic clubs of Ionia, before it was uprooted and re-established in Athens after the Greco-Turkish War. The founding members of Niki Volos, many of them refugees from Smyrna (now İzmir) and the surrounding region, decided to restore the emblem as part of their new club.

Historical crest

Crest until 2015

Crest (2019–)

== Kit evolution ==
1997–98	2003–04	2004–05	2005–06	2013–14	2014–15
2015–16	2016–17	2017–18	2018-19	2019–20	2020–21
2021–22	2022–23	2023–24	2024–25	2025–26	2026–27

== Titles and honours ==
=== Domestic ===
- Second Division
  - Winners (2): 1961, 2013–14
    - Runners-up (2): 1979–80, 2025–26
- Third Division
  - Winners (1): 1995–96
    - Runners-up (4): 1987–88, 2011–12, 2017–18, 2018–19
- Fourth Division
  - Winners (2): 1992–93, 2001–02
- Greek Football Amateur Cup
  - Winner (1): 1975–76

=== Regional ===
- Thessaly FCA Championship
  - Winners (15): 1932–33, 1937–38, 1945–46, 1947–48, 1948–59, 1949–50, 1950–51, 1952–53, 1953–54, 1955–56, 1956–57, 1957–58, 1959–60, 1960–61, 1975–76
- Thessaly FCA Cup
  - Winners (5): 1975–76, 2000–01, 2001–02, 2015–16, 2017–18
- Thessaly FCA Super Cup
  - Winners (1): 2016
- Volos Championship
  - Winners (14): 1932–33, 1933–33, 1937–38, 1948–59, 1949–50, 1950–51, 1952–53, 1953–54, 1955–56, 1956–57, 1957–58, 1958–59, 1959–60, 1960–61
- Volos Cup
  - Winners (2): 1933, 1944
- Thessaly Cup
  - Winners (3): 1939, 1947, 1954

=== Achievements ===
==== Leagues ====
- Panhellenic Championship
  - Fifth place (1): 1954
- Greek FCA Winners' Championship
  - First place (1): 1976

==== Cups ====
- Greek Cup
  - Semi-finals (2): 1946–47, 1964–65
  - Quarter-Finalists (7): 1955–56, 1956–57, 1958–59, 1959–60, 1962–63, 2005–06, 2023–24
- Greek Football Amateur Cup
  - Runners-up (1): 2017–18
  - Quarter-Finalists (1): 2001–02

== Personnel ==
=== Board of directors ===
Office	Nationality	Staff	Source
President	(Greece)	Nikolaos Papakostantinou	
Chief executive officer	(Greece)	Nikolaos Papakostantinou	
1st Vice president	(Greece)	Vasilios Venetis	
2nd Vice president	(Greece)	Ioannis Kazepidis	
Members	(Greece)	Alexios Papakonstantinou	
Members	(Greece)	Iordanis Xatziefraimidis	

=== Management ===
Office	Nationality	Staff
Owner	(Greece)	Alexios Papakonstantinou
Management Consultant for Competitive Affairs	(Greece)	Alexandros Tsemperidis
Sporting director	(Greece)	Christos Tzioras
Technical director	(Greece)	Stelios Marangos
Team manager	(Greece)	Manolis Apostolidis
Youth academy sporting directors	(Greece)	Kostas Grigoriadis

=== Technical staff ===
Office	Nationality	Staff
Head coach	(Greece)	Alekos Vosniadis
Assistant coach	(Greece)	Michalis Boukouvalas
Goalkeeper coach	(Greece)	Vasilis Petropoulos
Fitness coach	(Greece)	Antonis Kouris
Rehabilitation coach	(Greece)	Apostolos Moulios
Analyst	(Greece)	Xenofon Betsios
Doctor	(Greece)	Grigoris Manoudis
Physiotherapist	(Greece)	Apostolos Tyligadas

== Players ==
=== Current squad ===
As of 9 September 2026

Note: Flags indicate national team as defined under FIFA eligibility rules; some limited exceptions apply. Players may hold more than one non-FIFA nationality.

No.	Pos.	Nation	Player
1	GK	GRE	Athanasios Garavelis
2	DF	GRE	Nikos Vafeas
3	DF	SWE	Sebastian Ring
4	DF	GRE	Triantafyllos Pasalidis
5	MF	GHA	Stephen Hammond
6	MF	GRE	Konstantinos Plegas
7	MF	BRA	Lucas Poletto
8	MF	GRE	Pavlos Eppas
9	FW	GRE	Vasilios Mantzis
10	MF	GRE	Panagiotis Tzimas
11	MF	ESP	Victor Fernández
14	MF	GRE	Georgios Pamlidis
17	FW	GRE	Aristidis Venetis
18	DF	GRE	Christos Ligdas (on loan from A.E. Kifisia)
19	DF	GRE	Kyriakos Kivrakidis
21	MF	GRE	Achilleas Salamouras

No.	Pos.	Nation	Player
22	DF	ARG	Juan Manuel Arias
23	DF	GRE	Efstathios Panikidis
25	FW	GRE	Giannis Loukinas (captain)
26	MF	GRE	Argyris Darelas
27	MF	GRE	Emmanouil Tsobanis
30	DF	GRE	Christos Makrygiannis
33	MF	BEL	Stéphane Oméonga
34	GK	GRE	Themistoklis Tselios
40	DF	GRE	Christos Sioutas
43	GK	GRE	Giannis Saltas
53	MF	GRE	Theodosis Macheras
55	DF	GRE	Adam Tzanetopoulos (captain)
59	MF	GRE	Marios Kalaitsidis
77	MF	GRE	Leonidas Raios
88	DF	GRE	Fotis Chachoulis (on loan from A.E. Kifisia)

== Seasons in the 21st century ==
Season	Category	Position	Cup
2000–01	Delta Ethniki (4th division)	3rd	—
2001–02	Delta Ethniki (4th division)	1st	—
2002–03	Gamma Ethniki (3rd division)	4th	1R
2003–04	Beta Ethniki (2nd division)	6th	1R
2004–05	Beta Ethniki (2nd division)	4th	2R
2005–06	Beta Ethniki (2nd division)	10th	QF
2006–07	Beta Ethniki (2nd division)	18th	5R
2007–08	Gamma Ethniki (3rd division)	10th	2R
2008–09	Gamma Ethniki (3rd division)	7th	2R
2009–10	Gamma Ethniki (3rd division)	11th	1R
2010–11	Football League 2 (3rd division)	11th	1R
2011–12	Football League 2 (3rd division)	2nd	2R
2012–13	Football League (2nd Division)	5th	3R
2013–14	Football League (2nd division)	1st	3R
2014–15	Super League (1st division)	17th	GS
2015–16	Gamma Ethniki (3rd division)	3rd	—
2016–17	Gamma Ethniki (3rd division)	6th	—
2017–18	Gamma Ethniki (3rd division)	2nd	—
2018–19	Gamma Ethniki (3rd division)	2nd	GS
2019–20	Football League (3rd Division)	5th	3R
2020–21	Football League (3rd Division)	8th	Cancelled
2021–22	Super League 2 (2nd Division)	4th	R16
2022–23	Super League 2 (2nd Division)	3rd	4R
2023–24	Super League 2 (2nd Division)	4th	QF
2024–25	Super League 2 (2nd Division)	7th	3R
2025–26	Super League 2 (2nd Division)	2nd	1R
2026–27	Super League 2 (2nd Division)		

Key: 1R = First Round, 2R = Second Round, 3R = Third Round, 4R = Fourth Round, 5R = Fifth Round, GS = Group Stage, LF = League Phase, R16 = Round of 16, QF = Quarter-finals, SF = Semi-finals.

== Managerial history ==
Years	Nationality	Name	Notes
1953–1954	(Greece)	Stefanos Petritsis	
1958–1960	(Greece)	Dimitris Tzamtzis	
1960–1962	(Italy)	Ettore Trevisan	
1962–1963	(Socialist Federal Republic of Yugoslavia)	Ivan Stevović	
1963–1964	(Greece)	Kleanthis Vikelidis	
1964	(Greece)	Dimitris Kokkinakis	Caretaker
1964	(Greece)	Dimitris Tzamtzis	
1964–1965	(Hungary)	András Dolgos	
1965–1966	(Hungary)	Nándor Cserna	
1966–1967	(Greece)	Nikos Gametis	
1967–1968	(Greece)	Nikos Pangalos	
1968–1969	(Hungary)	Gyula Zsengellér	
1969–1971	(Greece)	Giourkas Seitaridis	
1971–1972	(Hungary)	Gyula Zsengellér	
1972	(Greece)	Alexandros Vogas	
1972–1973	(Greece)	Vasilios Daniil	
1973–1974	(Greece)	Christos Zanteroglou	
1974	(Greece)	Giorgos Kazanidis	
1974–1975	(England)	Giorgos Karpouzas	
1975–1976	(Greece)	Giorgos Kazanidis	
1976	(Greece)	Dimitris Tzimas	
1976–1977	(Greece)	Nikos Bairaktaris	
1977	(Greece)	Kostas Chatzimichail	
1977–1978	(Greece)	Christos Archontidis	
1978–1979	(Greece)	Achilleas Savvidis	
1979	(Greece)	Vasilios Daniil	
1979–1980	(Greece)	Andreas Troulialis	
1980–1981	(Greece)	Panagiotis Kasapleris	
1981	(Greece)	Giannis Kollias	
1981–1982	(Greece)	Nikos Bairaktaris	
1982–1983	(Portugal)	Gomez De Faria	
1983–1984	(Greece)	Giannis Karakasidis	
1984–1986	(Greece)	Christos Terzanidis	
1986–1987	(Greece)	Panagiotis Kermanidis	
1987–1989	(Greece)	Makis Katsavakis	
1989–1990	(Greece)	Thanasis Dimitriadia	
1990	(Greece)	Thomas Dramalis	
1990–1991	(Greece)	Nikos Kasapis	
1991–1992	(Greece)	Vangelis Stamoulakis	
1992	(Greece)	Nikos Kasapis	
1992–1993	(Greece)	Giorgos Panagiotopoulos	
1993	(Greece)	Christos Zanteroglou	
1993–1994	(Greece)	Giorgos Panagiotopoulos	
1994	(Greece)	Christos Zanteroglou	
1994–1995	(Greece)	Alekos Papadopoulos	
1995	(Greece)	Christos Zanteroglou	
1995–1996	(Argentina)	Horacio Moráles	
1996–1997	(Greece)	Stelios Skevofilakas	
1997	(Greece)	Vasilis Antoniadis	
1997–1998	(Germany)	Gerhard Prokop	
1998	(Greece)	Giannis Chatzis	Caretaker
1998–1999	(Greece)	Petros Michos	
1999	(Greece)	Giannis Chatzis	Caretaker
1999	(Greece)	Andreas Mitromaras	Caretaker
1999–2000	(Greece)	Vangelis Vouroukos	
2000	(Greece)	Dionysis Beslikas	
2000–2001	(Greece)	Giannis Psarras	
2001	(Greece)	Tzimis Alexiou	
2001–2002	(Serbia) (Greece)	Ivan Jovanović	
2002–2003	(Greece)	Nikos Chatzikyriakidis	
2003	(Greece)	Kostas Stamatiou	
2003–2004	(Greece)	Nikos Kourbanas	
2004	(Greece)	Giorgos Panagiotopoulos	Caretaker
2004–2005	(Czech Republic)	Radek Rabušic	
2005	(Greece)	Takis Anagnostopoulos	Caretaker
2005	(Greece)	Giannis Gounaris	
2005–2006	(Greece)	Myron Sifakis	
2006	(Greece)	Nikos Kourbanas	
2006	(North Macedonia)	Gjoko Hadžievski	
2006	(Greece)	Dimitrios Moutas	
2006	(Greece)	Myron Sifakis	
2006–2007	(Greece)	Giorgos Foiros	
2007	(Greece)	Stavros Diamantopoulos	
2007–2008	(Greece)	Nikolaos Zalikas	
2008	(Greece)	Nikos Kourbanas	
2008–2009	(Greece) (Australia)	Leon Gardikiotis	
2009	(Serbia)	Veljko Dovedan	
2009–2010	(Greece)	Jorge Barrios	
2010–2011	(Greece)	Pedro Pasculli	
2011	(Greece)	Apostolos Charalampidis	
2011	(Serbia)	Veljko Dovedan	
2011–2012	(Greece)	Alexandros Alexiou	
2012	(Greece)	Apostolos Charalampidis	
2012	(Greece)	Periklis Amanatidis	
2012–2013	(Greece)	Stelios Manolas	
2013	(Greece)	Leonidas Bilis	Caretaker
2013	(Greece)	Georgios Chatzaras	
2013	(Greece)	Apostolos Charalampidis	
2013	(Greece)	Panagiotis Tzanavaras	
2013	(Greece)	Nikos Chondrodinis	Caretaker
2013–2014	(Greece) (Brazil)	Luciano de Souza	
2014	(Greece)	Alekos Vosniadis	
2014	(Netherlands)	Wiljan Vloet	
2014	(Belgium)	Sven Vandenbroeck	Caretaker
2014–2015	(Greece)	Panagiotis Tzanavaras	
2015–2016	(Greece)	Kostas Velitzelos	
2016	(Greece)	Ilias Sorokos	Caretaker
2016	(Greece)	Stefanos Xirofotos	
2016	(Greece)	Leonidas Bilis	
2016–2017	(Greece)	Stefanos Xirofotos	
2017–2018	(Belgium)	Fangio Buyse	
2018	(Greece)	Giorgos Koutsis	
2018–2019	(Serbia)	Ratko Dostanić	
2019	(Spain)	Isaac Jové Rubí	
2019–2021	(Greece)	Staikos Vergetis	
2021–2022	(Greece)	Alekos Vosniadis	
2022–2024	(Greece)	Dimitrios Eleftheropoulos	
2024–2025	(Greece)	Stefanos Xirofotos	
2025–2026	(Greece)	Konstantinos Georgiadis	
2026	(Greece)	Stelios Malezas	
2026–	(Greece)	Alekos Vosniadis	

== Records and statistics ==
Information correct as of the match played on 21 September 2026. Bold denotes an active player for the club.
The tables refer to Niki Volos' players in Super League Greece, Greek Football Cup, Second Division Greece and Third Division Greece .

=== Top 10 Most capped players ===
Rank	Player	Years	App
1	(Greece) Christos Tzioras	2013–2015, 2017–2018, 2021–2026	158
2	(Greece) Dimitris Balafas	2002–2007	102
3	(Greece) Vangelis Roumeliotis	2002–2007	98
4	(Greece) Spyros Gagas	2002–2007	97
5	(Greece) Vangelis Andreou	2021–2024	94
6	(Greece) Pavlos Kyriakidis	2021–2024	93
7	(Greece) Paschalis Kassos	2021–2024	86
8	(Greece) Panagiotis Panagiotidis	2021–2024	85
9	(Albania) Neti Meçe	2014–2019, 2020–2024	76
10	(Argentina) Antonio Rojano	2019–2023	75

=== Top 10 Goalscorers ===
Rank	Player	Years	Goals
1	(Greece) Christos Tzioras	2013–2015, 2017–2018, 2021–2026	39
2	(Spain) Añete	2013–2014	21
3	(Equatorial Guinea) Josete Miranda	2021–2024	20
4	(Argentina) Antonio Rojano	2019–2023	19
5	(Greece) Giorgos Saitiotis	2005–2006	18
6	(Greece) **Giannis Loukinas**	2025–	17
7	(Spain) Isaac Jové	2013–2014	13
8	(Greece) Paschalis Kassos	2021–2024	12
9	(Greece) Konstantinos Fligos (Greece) Dimitris Balafas	2012–2013; 2002–2007	11
10	(Greece) Petros Konteon (Greece) Tasos Kritikos (Greece) Vassilis Gavriilidis (Argentina) Lucas García	2004–2005; 2023–2024; 2022–2024; 2020–2022	9
