= Christos Zanteroglou =

Greek footballer (1940–2023)

Personal information
- Date of birth: 12 July 1940
- Place of birth: Nea Ionia, Magnesia, Greece
- Date of death: 4 March 2023 (aged 82)
- Height: 1.77 m (5 ft 10 in)
- Position: Defender

Youth career
- 1955–1958: Niki Volos

Senior career*
Years	Team	Apps	(Gls)
1955–1965	Niki Volos		
1965–1970	Olympiacos	158	(5)
1970–1973	Egaleo	84	(2)
1973–1975	Atromitos		

International career
- Greece U19
1964–1969	Greece	13	(0)
- * Club domestic league appearances and goals

Christos Zanteroglou (Greek: Χρήστος Ζαντέρογλου; 12 July 1940 – 4 March 2023) was a Greek footballer who played as a defender. He played in 13 matches for the Greece national team from 1964 to 1969.

Zanteroglou died on 4 March 2023, at the age of 82. He has the record with 164 consecutive appearances at the first Greek League.
