= Niki Volos (sports club) =

Greek multi-sport club

- Full name: Gymnastikos Syllogos Niki Volos; Γυμναστικός Σύλλογος Νίκη Βόλου
- Founded: August 19, 1924; 101 years ago
- Colours: Blue, White
- Chairman: Iordanis Xatziefraimidis
- Website: Club website

G.S. Niki Volos (full name Gymnastikos Syllogos Niki Volos/ Greek: Γυμναστικός Σύλλογος Νίκη Βόλου) is a Greek multi-sport club based in Nea Ionia, Magnesia. It was founded on 19 August 1924 and it has teams in football, basketball, volleyball, water polo, athletics and other sports.

== History ==
Niki Volos was founded in 1924 as Gymnastic Club of Volos' Refugees. After two years, in 1926, it was decided to change the name of the sports club. Panionios and Apollon were the first names that fell on the table and in fact there was a strong disagreement. The solution was provided by the then president, Maurikios Panas, who, seeing a statuette of Nike of Paionios, proposed the name "Niki Volos".

Football club of Niki participated for the first time in the championship of the first category before the establishment of the First National, as in 1953–54 she was the winner of the Northern Group and this gave her the ticket for the final phase of the National Division Championship 1953–54, Six teams (Athens (2) – Piraeus – Thessaloniki – North – South) took the 5th place with 16 points, ahead of Panahaiki, who finished the championship with 13.

Niki won for the first time in the 1961 Beta Ethniki, where she had 5 appearances in the big league. In 1966 she was relegated to the Beta Ethniki and since then has been trying to regain her rise to the big category, which eventually succeeded 48 years later, in 2014–15. In 1976 she won the Amateur Cup.

The club's men's basketball team competes in Greek Basketball League the seasons 1972–73 and 1984–85. In 1987 and 2017 Niki Volos won the ESKATH championship.

== Sport facilities ==
- Panthessaliko Stadium
- Pantelis Magoulas Stadium
- Nea Ionia Indoor Hall
- Nea Ionia Swimming Pool

== Domestic honours ==
Football team

- Second Division
  - Winners (2): 1960–61, 2013–14
- Third Division
  - Winners (1): 1995–96
- Fourth Division
  - Winners (2): 1992–93, 2001–02
- Greek Football Amateur Cup
  - Winner (1): 1975–76

Basketball team

- Greek 2nd Division
  - Winners (1): 1983–84
- Greek 4th Division
  - Winners (2): 1988–89, 1993–94, 1995–96, 2010–11
- Provincial Championship
  - Winners (2): 1972, 1987

== Notable supporters ==
- Angelos Argyris, footballer, former Niki Volos player
- Dimitris Balafas, footballer and coach, former Niki Volos captain
- Lavrentis Machairitsas, singer
- Dimitrios Kokkinakis, footballer, former Niki Volos player, lifelong fan
- Giannis Paflias, footballer and coach, former Niki Volos captain

== See also ==
- Volos derby
