= 1970–71 Beta Ethniki =

Beta Ethniki
- Season: 1970–71
- Dates: 4 October 1970 – 13 June 1971
- Champions: Panachaiki (Group 1); Trikala (Group 2); Olympiacos Volos (Group 3)
- Promoted: Panachaiki; Trikala; Olympiacos Volos
- Relegated: Ergotelis; Aris Agios Konstantinos; Ethnikos Alexandroupoli

Beta Ethniki 1970–71 complete season.

== Group 1 ==
=== League table ===
Pos	Team	Pld	W	D	L	GF	GA	GD	Pts	Promotion or relegation
1	Panachaiki (C, P)	34	22	10	2	56	19	+37	88	Promotion to Alpha Ethniki
2	Koropi	34	17	8	9	42	26	+16	76	
3	Panetolikos	34	17	7	10	46	30	+16	75	
4	Kallithea	34	14	11	9	38	27	+11	73	
5	Ionikos	34	16	7	11	37	28	+9	73	
6	Korinthos	34	13	12	9	45	30	+15	72	
7	Acharnaikos	34	11	13	10	30	28	+2	68 (Note: Acharnaikos and Panegialios had 1 point deducted.)	
8	Anagennisi Arta	34	11	11	12	47	48	−1	67	
9	Panarkadikos	34	11	11	12	37	39	−2	67	
10	Kalamata	34	13	6	15	36	69	−33	66	
11	Chania	34	12	7	15	39	32	+7	65	
12	Panegialios	34	10	12	12	34	39	−5	65	
13	PAS Giannina	34	9	13	12	34	42	−8	65	
14	Ethnikos Asteras	34	12	7	15	36	46	−10	65	
15	Panargiakos	34	12	6	16	43	48	−5	64	
16	Pannafpliakos	34	8	14	12	29	37	−8	64	
17	Kerkyra	34	8	13	13	28	34	−6	63	
18	Ergotelis (R)	34	3	6	25	15	80	−65	46	Relegation to C National Amateur Division

(C) Champions; (P) Promoted; (R) Relegated

== Group 2 ==
=== League table ===
Pos	Team	Pld	W	D	L	GF	GA	GD	Pts	Promotion or relegation
1	Trikala (C, P)	34	20	8	6	50	20	+30	82 (Note: Trikala and Panelefsiniakos were decided who promote to the Alpha Ethniki in the play-off match.)	Promotion to Alpha Ethniki
2	Panelefsiniakos	34	21	6	7	56	34	+22	82	
3	Vyzas	34	21	5	8	42	26	+16	81	
4	AEL	34	15	15	4	39	25	+14	79	
5	Atromitos	34	17	6	11	60	35	+25	74	
6	Lamia	34	14	9	11	45	38	+7	71	
7	Rodos	34	12	12	10	39	37	+2	70	
8	Anagennisi Karditsa	34	11	12	11	33	29	+4	68	
9	Chalkida	34	7	17	10	30	32	−2	65	
10	Aias Salamina	34	9	13	12	29	31	−2	65	
11	Panaspropyrgiakos	34	7	17	10	38	46	−8	65	
12	Levadiakos	34	11	8	15	34	38	−4	64	
13	Ikaros Athens	34	10	10	14	33	40	−7	64	
14	Atromitos Piraeus	34	13	4	17	47	61	−14	64	
15	Argonaftis Piraeus	34	8	13	13	35	45	−10	63	
16	Niki Volos	34	8	12	14	25	40	−15	62	
17	AFC Patra	34	8	8	18	35	50	−15	58	
18	Aris Agios Konstantinos (R)	34	3	7	24	26	71	−45	46 (Note: ?1 point deducted?)	Relegation to C National Amateur Division

(C) Champions; (P) Promoted; (R) Relegated

=== Promotion play-off ===
Team 1	Score	Team 2
Trikala	1–0	Panelefsiniakos

== Group 3 ==
=== League table ===
Pos	Team	Pld	W	D	L	GF	GA	GD	Pts	Promotion or relegation
1	Olympiacos Volos (C, P)	34	19	11	4	64	19	+45	83	Promotion to Alpha Ethniki
2	Kastoria	34	18	11	5	43	15	+28	81	
3	Apollon Kalamarias	34	18	8	8	53	24	+29	78	
4	Doxa Drama	34	14	11	9	50	36	+14	73	
5	Makedonikos	34	11	11	12	32	25	+7	67	
6	Kozani	34	13	7	14	43	42	+1	67	
7	Kilkisiakos	34	9	15	10	27	33	−6	67	
8	Apollon Krya Vrysi	34	10	12	12	49	48	+1	66	
9	Panthrakikos	34	10	12	12	35	34	+1	66	
10	Edessaikos	34	10	12	12	25	29	−4	66	
11	Xanthi	34	10	11	13	27	34	−7	65	
12	Foinikas Polichni	34	10	11	13	41	50	−9	65	
13	AO Karditsa	34	13	5	16	35	53	−18	65	
14	Pandramaikos	34	11	8	15	30	40	−10	64	
15	AE Florina	34	11	8	15	25	45	−20	64	
16	Anagennisi Giannitsa	34	8	13	13	28	37	−9	63	
17	Aris Ptolemaida	34	10	10	14	38	38	0	63 (Note: Aris Ptolemaida had 1 point deducted.)	
18	Ethnikos Alexandroupoli (R)	34	6	14	14	22	55	−33	60	Relegation to C National Amateur Division

(C) Champions; (P) Promoted; (R) Relegated
