= Irdi Rapaj =

Albanian footballer (born 1993)

Personal information
- Full name: Irdi Rapaj
- Date of birth: 15 September 1993 (age 33)
- Place of birth: Fier, Albania
- Position: Striker

Team information
- Current team: Wingate & Finchley

Senior career*
Years	Team	Apps	(Gls)
2012–2013	Bylis	7	(0)
2013	→ Apolonia (loan)	8	(1)
2013–2014	Gorica		
2014–2015	Panelefsiniakos		
2015–2016	Forlì	1	(0)
2016	Opountios		
2016	Ravenna	2	(0)
2016	Proodeftiki		
2016–2017	Olympiakos Laurium		
2017	Weston-super-Mare	9	(3)
2018	Wingate & Finchley	9	(3)
2018	Braintree Town	3	(0)
2019	Wingate & Finchley	13	(2)
- * Club domestic league appearances and goals as of 19:44, 21 March 2020 (UTC)

Irdi Rapaj (born 15 September 1993), also known as Irdi Rrapaj or Irnti Rapai, is an Albanian footballer who plays as a striker.
