= Phthiotis Football Clubs Association =

Association football governing body in Phthiotis Prefecture, Greece

Greece
- Full name: Phthiotis Football Clubs Association; Greek: Ένωση Ποδοσφαιρικών Σωματείων Φθιώτιδας
- Short name: Phthiotis F.C.A.; Greek: Ε.Π.Σ. Φθιώτιδας
- Founded: 1951; 75 years ago
- Headquarters: Lamia, Greece
- FIFA affiliation: Hellenic Football Federation
- President: Michael Kordolemis
- Vice-President: Dimitrios Katsouras
- General Secretary: Christos Fafoutis
- Website: epsf.gr

Phthiotis Football Clubs Association (Greek: Ένωση Ποδοσφαιρικών Σωματείων Φθιώτιδας) is a association football organization in Phthiotis that is part of Hellenic Football Federation. It was formed in 1951 as Phthiotis-Phocis Union (Ένωση Φθιωτιδοφωκίδας, Enossi Phthiotidophokidas) and included teams from Phthiotis and the neighbouring prefectures of Phocis and Evrytania. The Phocis FCA was formed in the 1985–86 season and later its organization in Evrytania was created in 1990. Its offices and headquarters is located at Othonos Street in the city of Lamia, in People's Square. The association currently has three divisions: the A1 division which features 18 clubs, the Premier and the second division. The winner of the A1 Division enters the national Fourth Division, teams finished 15th–18th relegates to the Premier division.

== The early years ==
Association football in Phthiotis was first played in the mid-1920s. From 1930 until 1940 Olympiacos Lamia won every title except for 1935 when Pallamiaki won the championship. Postwar, between 1946 and the 1950–51 season, Olympiacos Lamia won six more titles, one of the most famous being in 1947 when Ethnikos Lamias won 5-0 against Pallamiaki on May 23 and won the local championships.

== League ==
=== Champions ===
Season	Champion
1951–52	Olympiacos Lamia
1952–53	Olympiacos Lamia
1953–54	Olympiacos Lamia
1954–55	Pallamiaki
1955–56	Olympiacos Lamia
1956–57	Pallamiaki
1957–58	Olympiacos Lamia
1958–59	Pallamiaki
1959–60	Pallamiaki
1960–61	Pallamiaki
1961–62	Olympiacos Lamia
1962–63	Pamfthiotikos
1963–64	Pallamiaki
1964–65	Fokikos
1965–66	AO Stylida (Note: As Panstyliakos)
1966–67	AO Stylida (Note: As Panstyliakos)
1967–68	Aris Agios Konstantinos
1968–69	Aris Agios Konstantinos
1969–70	Aris Agios Konstantinos
1970–71	AO Stylida
1971–72	Aris Agios Konstantinos
1972–73	AS Lamia
1973–74	Fokikos
1974–75	AO Malesina
1975–76	Fokikos
1976–77	Aris Agios Konstantinos
1977–78	Pallamiaki
1978–79	AO Malesina
1979–80	Pallamiaki
1980–81	AO Malesina
1981–82	Iraklis Roditsa
1982–83	Pallamiaki
1983–84	Iraklis Roditsa
1984–85	Fokikos
1985–86	AO Stylida
1986–87	AO Malesina
1987–88	Pallamiaki
1988–89	Aris Agios Konstantinos
1989–90	AO Kamena Vourla
1990–91	AO Malesina
1991–92	APO Atalanti
1992–93	Atromitos Spercheiada
1993–94	Iraklis Roditsa
1994–95	Olympiacos Anthili
1995–96	Olympiacos Agioi Theodoroi Lamia
1996–97	Olympiacos Anthili
1997–98	Iraklis Roditsa
1998–99	Olympiacos Anthili
1999–00	Iraklis Roditsa
2000–01	AO Stylida
2001–02	Dafni Livanates
2002–03	AO Stylida
2003–04	AO Malesina
2004–05	Dafni Livanates
2005–06	Aris Agios Konstantinos
2006–07	Opountios Martino
2007–08	Agrotis Lianokladi
2008–09	Atromitos Spercheiada
2009–10	Niki Makrakomi
2010–11	AO Kamena Vourla
2011–12	Achilleas Domokos
2012–13	AO Stylida
2013–14	Opountios Martino
2014–15	AE Malesina 2008
2015–16	Olympiacos Lamia 1977
2016–17	Opountios Martino
2017–18	AO Stylida
2018–19	APO Atalanti
2019–20	Opountios Martino
2020–21	Cancelled
2021–22	AO Stylida
2022–23	Asteras Stavros
2023–24	AE Malesina 2008
2024–25	AO Stylida
2025–26	Kifissos Kato Tithorea

=== Performance by club ===
Club	Titles	Season
Pallamiaki	10	1955, 1957, 1959, 1960, 1961, 1964, 1978, 1980, 1983, 1988
AO Stylida	10	1966, 1967, 1971, 1986, 2001, 2003, 2013, 2018, 2022, 2025
Aris Agios Konstantinos	7	1968, 1969, 1970, 1972, 1977, 1989, 2006
Olympiacos Lamia	6	1952, 1953, 1954, 1956, 1958, 1962
AO Malesina	6	1975, 1979, 1981, 1987, 1991, 2004
Iraklis Roditsa	5	1982, 1984, 1994, 1998, 2000
Fokikos	4	1965, 1974, 1976, 1985
Opountios Martino	4	2007, 2014, 2017, 2020
Olympiacos Anthili	3	1995, 1997, 1999
AO Kamena Vourla	2	1990, 2011
APO Atalanti	2	1992, 2019
Atromitos Spercheiada	2	1993, 2009
Dafni Livanates	2	2002, 2005
AE Malesina 2008	2	2015, 2024
Pamfthiotikos	1	1963
AS Lamia	1	1973
Olympiacos Agioi Theodoroi Lamia	1	1996
Agrotis Lianokladi	1	2008
Niki Makrakomi	1	2010
Achilleas Domokos	1	2012
Olympiacos Lamia 1977	1	2016
Asteras Stavros	1	2023
Kifissos Kato Tithorea	1	2026

== Cup ==
=== Cup Winners ===
Season	Winner
1972–73	AS Lamia
1973–74	Iraklis Lamia
1974–75	Fokikos
1975–76	Fokikos
1976–77	Fokikos
1977–78	AO Malesina
1978–79	Pallamiaki
1979–80	AO Stylida
1980–81	AO Malesina
1981–82	AS Lamia
1982–83	Pallamiaki
1983–84	Proodeftiki Larymna
1984–85	APOK Velouchi
1985–86	Pallamiaki
1986–87	Pallamiaki
1987–88	AO Stylida
1988–89	AS Lamia
1989–90	AS Lamia
1990–91	Pagkratiakos
1991–92	Apollon Lamia
1992–93	APO Atalanti
1993–94	AS Lamia
1994–95	Olympiacos Anthili
1995–96	APO Atalanti
1996–97	AO Malesina
1997–98	Kifissos Kato Tithorea
1998–99	AS Lamia
1999–00	AS Lamia
2000–01	Iraklis Roditsa
2001–02	AO Stylida
2002–03	AS Lamia
2003–04	Dafni Livanates
2004–05	Elateiakos
2005–06	Elateiakos
2006–07	Keravnos Vathykoilo
2007–08	Pandamastiakos
2008–09	Atromitos Spercheiada
2009–10	Atromitos Spercheiada
2010–11	Agrotis Lianokladi
2011–12	Aris Agios Konstantinos
2012–13	PAS Lamia 1964
2013–14	Enosi 2010
2014–15	AO Kamena Vourla
2015–16	Opountios Martino
2016–17	Olympiacos Lamia 1977
2017–18	AO Kalapodi
2018–19	APO Atalanti
2019–20	Opountios Martino
2020–21	Cancelled
2021–22	Asteras Stavros
2022–23	Olympiacos Lamia 1977
2023–24	Asteras Stavros
2024–25	AE Malesina 2008
2025–26	AE Malesina 2008

=== Performance by club ===
Club	Titles	Season
AS Lamia / PAS Lamia 1964	9	1973, 1982, 1989, 1990, 1994, 1999, 2000, 2003, 2013
Pallamiaki	4	1979, 1983, 1986, 1987
Fokikos	3	1975, 1976, 1977
AO Malesina	3	1978, 1981, 1997
AO Stylida	3	1980, 1988, 2002
APO Atalanti	3	1993, 1996, 2019
Elateiakos	2	2005, 2006
Atromitos Spercheiada	2	2009, 2010
Opountios Martino	2	2016, 2020
Olympiacos Lamia 1977	2	2017, 2023
Asteras Stavros	2	2022, 2024
AE Malesina 2008	2	2025, 2026
Iraklis Lamia	1	1974
Proodeftiki Larymna	1	1984
APOK Velouchi	1	1985
Pagkratiakos	1	1991
Apollon Lamia	1	1992
Olympiacos Anthili	1	1995
Kifissos Kato Tithorea	1	1998
Iraklis Roditsa	1	2001
Dafni Livanates	1	2004
Keravnos Vathykoilo	1	2007
Pandamastiakos	1	2008
Agrotis Lianokladi	1	2011
Aris Agios Konstantinos	1	2012
Enosi 2010	1	2014
AO Kamena Vourla	1	2015
AO Kalapodi	1	2018

== Super Cup ==
=== Finals ===
Season	Winner	Score	Runner-up
2011	Agrotis Lianokladi	2–1	AO Kamena Vourla
2012	Achilleas Domokos	4–3	Aris Agios Konstantinos
2014	Opountios Martino	5–1	Enosi 2010
2015	AE Malesina 2008	3–1	AO Kamena Vourla
2016	Opountios Martino	2–1	Olympiacos Lamia 1977
2018	AO Stylida	3–0	Opountios Martino

=== Performance by club ===
Club	Winners	Runners-up	Winning Seasons	Runner-up Seasons
Opountios Martino	2	1	2014, 2016	2018
Agrotis Lianokladi	1	0	2011	—
Achilleas Domokos	1	0	2012	—
AE Malesina 2008	1	0	2015	—
AO Stylida	1	0	2018	—
AO Kamena Vourla	0	2	—	2011, 2015
Aris Agios Konstantinos	0	1	—	2012
Enosi 2010	0	1	—	2014
Olympiacos Lamia 1977	0	1	—	2016
