= Giannis Saltas =

Greek footballer

Personal information
- Full name: Ioannis Saltas
- Date of birth: 5 March 2002 (age 24)
- Place of birth: Greece
- Position: Goalkeeper

Team information
- Current team: Niki Volos
- Number: 43

Senior career*
Years	Team	Apps	(Gls)
2021–2025	Atromitos	1	(0)
2025–2026	Ethnikos Asteras		
2026–	Niki Volos	0	(0)
- * Club domestic league appearances and goals as of 30 June 2024

Giannis Saltas (Greek: Γιάννης Σάλτας; born 5 March 2002) is a Greek professional footballer who plays as a goalkeeper for Super League 2 club Niki Volos.
