= Nikolaos Zalikas =

Greek football manager (born in 1962)

Nikos Zalikas
Personal information
- Full name: Nikolaos Zalikas
- Date of birth: 9 April 1962 (age 64)
- Place of birth: Katerini, Greece

Managerial career
- Years: Team
- 1993: PAOK (caretaker)
- 2005: Apollon Kalamarias (caretaker)
- 2006: Lamia
- 2006–2007: Panserraikos
- 2007–2008: Niki Volos
- 2008: Kavala
- 2008: Thermaikos
- 2013: Anagennisi Giannitsa
- 2015: Pierikos
- 2016–2017: Pierikos
- 2017: Kalamata
- 2025: Olympiacos Volos

Nikolaos Zalikas (Greek: Νικόλαος Ζαλίκας; born 9 April 1962) is a Greek professional football manager.

== Managerial career ==
He was active manager of the staff PAOK, but only from 25 to 30 January 1993.

He hails from Katerini. Managing Anagennisi Giannitsa in the second tier, he resigned in November 2013.

In 2017 he took over Kalamata.

He spent time as a coach in Kazakhstan in Germany. Among others, he ran an academy for FV Hellas Rüsselsheim. In 2023 he was wanted by A.E. Lefkimmi.

In August 2025 he was hired as the new manager of Olympiacos Volos. He pledged to win two successive promotions from the Thessaly First Division and then the Gamma Ethniki. In December of the same year, he left Olympiacos team.
