= Christos Tzioras =

Greek footballer

Personal information
- Date of birth: 5 October 1988 (age 38)
- Place of birth: Galatini, Kozani, Greece
- Height: 1.82 m (5 ft 11 1/2 in)
- Position: Striker

Team information
- Current team: Niki Volos (sporting director)

Youth career
- –2007: AMS Galatinis

Senior career*
Years	Team	Apps	(Gls)
2007–2008	Polykastro	40	(2)
2008–2009	PAS Florina		
2009–2010	Kozani		
2010	Pyrsos Grevena		
2010–2011	Aetos Skydra	1	(0)
2011–2012	Panargiakos		
2012–2013	Vataniakos	1	(0)
2013–2015	Niki Volos	66	(20)
2015–2016	Apollon Smyrnis	45	(10)
2016–2017	Acharnaikos	8	(2)
2017	Veria	1	(0)
2017–2018	Niki Volos	11	(7)
2019	Karaiskakis	19	(9)
2019–2020	Chania	12	(2)
2020–2021	Levadiakos	16	(3)
2021–2026	Niki Volos	75	(15)
- * Club domestic league appearances and goals as of 20 April 2026

Christos Tzioras (Greek: Χρήστος Τζιώρας; born 5 October 1988) is a Greek former professional footballer who plays as a striker.
