= Panagiotis Tzanavaras =

Greek footballer and manager

Personal information
- Full name: Panagiotis Tzanavaras
- Date of birth: 30 October 1964 (age 62)
- Place of birth: Korinthos, Greece

Managerial career
- Years: Team
- 2004–2005: Korinthos
- 2006–2008: Asteras Tripolis
- 2008–2009: Panachaiki
- 2009–2010: Rodos
- 2009–2010: Korinthos
- 2010–2011: Panegialios
- 2011–2012: Asteras Magoula
- 2012: Vyzas Megara
- 2012–2013: Doxa Drama
- 2012–2013: Niki Volos
- 2013–2014: Doxa Drama
- 2013–2014: AEL
- 2014–2015: Niki Volos
- 2015: AEL
- 2015: Panegialios
- 2016: Olympiacos Volos
- 2016–2017: Doxa Drama
- 2017: Proodeftiki
- 2017: Sparta
- 2020–2021: Ypato
- 2021: Panarkadikos
- 2021–2022: Aittitos Spata
- 2022: Panargiakos
- 2023: Korinthos
- 2023: Korinthos (technical director)
- 2023–2024: Ellopiakos
- 2026: Korinthos

Panagiotis Tzanavaras (Greek: Παναγιώτης Τζαναβάρας; born 30 October 1964) is a Greek professional football manager and former player.

As a footballer, he played 16 years for Kalamata, Korinthos, Panelefsiniakos, Panafpliakos, and Olympiakos Loutraki. He holds an UEFA Pro Coaching Licence.
