= APOK Velouchi F.C. =

APOK Velouchi
- Founded: 1968; 58 years ago
- Ground: Karpenisi Municipal Stadium
- Capacity: 2,500
- Chairman: Aristidis Tsiounis
- Manager: Spyros Kolokas
- League: Evrytania FCA First Division
- 2025–26: Evrytania FCA First Division, 2nd
| Home colours | Away colours |

APOK Velouchi F.C. is a Greek football club, based in Karpenisi, Evrytania, Greece.

== History ==
Athlitikos Podosfairikos Omilos Karpenisiou "Velouchi" was founded in 1968. Until the 1989–90 season, it participated in the championships of Phthiotidophocida. Since 1991, it has competed in the top division of Evrytania.

== Stadium ==
APOK plays its home matches at the Karpenisi National Municipal Stadium, which has a seating capacity of 2,500 and features an artificial turf pitch. The stadium was built in 1969 and renovated in 2010.

== Honours ==
=== Domestic Titles and honours ===
  - Evrytania FCA Champions: 14
    - 1990–91, 1992–93, 1994–95, 1996–97, 1999–00, 2000–01, 2001–02, 2003–04, 2005–06, 2010–11, 2013–14, 2016–17, 2019–20, 2024–25
  - Evrytania FCA Cup Winners: 18
    - 1990–91, 1991–92, 1992–93, 1993–94, 1995–96, 1996–97, 1997–98, 1998–99, 2000–01, 2001–02, 2002–03, 2004–05, 2006–07, 2008–09, 2009–10, 2011–12, 2012–13, 2017–18
  - Phthiotis-Phocis FCA Cup Winners: 1
    - 1984–85
