= Evrytania Football Clubs Association =

Association football governing body in Evrytania Prefecture, Greece

- Full name: Evrytania Football Clubs Association; Greek: Ένωση Ποδοσφαιρικών Σωματείων Ευρυτανίας
- Short name: Evrytania F.C.A.; Greek: Ε.Π.Σ. Ευρυτανίας
- Founded: 1990; 36 years ago
- Headquarters: Karpenisi, Greece
- FIFA affiliation: Hellenic Football Federation
- President: Georgios Papantzimas
- Website: eps-evrytanias.blogspot.com

Evrytania Football Clubs Association (Greek: Ένωση Ποδοσφαιρικών Σωματείων Ευρυτανίας) is one of the newest Greek amateur association football governing bodies, representing teams from Evrytania Prefecture. It was formed in 1990. It was like an autonomous union, from 1974 until 1985, teams participated in the Fthiotida-Fokida FCA and up to 1990, the Phthiotis FCA. Its offices are located in Valaoritou 3 in Karpenisi and it is a member of Hellenic Football Federation.

The jurisdiction which subjects organizations of the local cup and championship. During the 2011–12 season in the men's category, it sustained two divisions. The premier division with only 10 clubs and the second division with only 3 clubs.

The winner of the first division participates in the playoffs, takes part in the entry into the Fourth Division, the team who finishes last relegates.

== League ==
=== Championships ===
Year	Winner
1991	APOK Velouchi
1992	Kerasovo
1993	APOK Velouchi
1994	Kerasovo
1995	APOK Velouchi
1996	Aiolos Karpenisi
1997	APOK Velouchi
1998	Evrytos Langadi
1999	Aiolos Karpenisi
2000	APOK Velouchi
2001	APOK Velouchi
2002	APOK Velouchi
2003	Myriki
2004	APOK Velouchi
2005	Myriki
2006	APOK Velouchi
2007	Myriki
2008	Anagennisi Palaiokatouna
2009	Myriki
2010	Aperantiakos Valaora
2011	APOK Velouchi
2012	Aiolos Karpenisi
2013	Myriki
2014	APOK Velouchi
2015	Aiolos Karpenisi
2016	Aiolos Karpenisi
2017	APOK Velouchi
2018	Potamia
2019	Potamia
2020	APOK Velouchi
2021	cancelled
2022	Aiolos Karpenisi
2023	Aiolos Karpenisi
2024	Potamia
2025	APOK Velouchi
2026	Katsantonis Agrafa

=== Performance by club ===
Club	Titles	Season
APOK Velouchi	14	1991, 1993, 1995, 1997, 2000, 2001, 2002, 2004, 2006, 2011, 2014, 2017, 2020, 2025
Aiolos Karpenisi	7	1996, 1999, 2012, 2015, 2016, 2022, 2023
Myriki	5	2003, 2005, 2007, 2009, 2013
Potamia	3	2018, 2019, 2024
Kerasovo	2	1992, 1994
Evrytos Langadi	1	1998
Anagennisi Palaiokatouna	1	2008
Aperantiakos Valaora	1	2010
Katsantonis Agrafa	1	2026

== Cup ==
=== Finals ===
Season	Winner	Score	Runner-up
1990–91	APOK Velouchi	2–0	Aiolos Karpenisi
1991–92	APOK Velouchi	6–1	Doxa Raptopoulou
1992–93	APOK Velouchi	1–0	Aiolos Karpenisi
1993–94	APOK Velouchi	5–0	Aiolos Karpenisi
1994–95	Aiolos Karpenisi	3–1	Anagennisi Palaiokatouna
1995–96	APOK Velouchi	1–0	AO Potamia
1996–97	APOK Velouchi	2–0	Aiolos Karpenisi
1997–98	APOK Velouchi	5–1	AO Myriki
1998–99	APOK Velouchi	5–1	Aiolos Karpenisi
1999–00	Aiolos Karpenisi	8–1	Doxa Raptopoulou
2000–01	APOK Velouchi	2–1	Aperantiakos Valaora
2001–02	APOK Velouchi	3–2	AO Myriki
2002–03	APOK Velouchi	1–0	AO Myriki
2003–04	Aiolos Karpenisi	1–0	APOK Velouchi
2004–05	APOK Velouchi	7–1	Aperantiakos Valaora
2005–06	Aiolos Karpenisi	2–1	APO Dytiki Fragkista
2006–07	APOK Velouchi	4–1	AO Potamia
2007–08	APOK Velouchi	2–0	AEK Agioi Evrytanes
2008–09	APOK Velouchi	2–0	Aiolos Karpenisi
2009–10	APOK Velouchi	3–0	Aperantiakos Valaora
2010–11	Aperantiakos Valaora	3–0	APOK Velouchi
2011–12	APOK Velouchi	6–0	Katsantonis Agrafon
2012–13	APOK Velouchi	2–0	AO Myriki
2013–14	Aiolos Karpenisi	4–0	APO Dytiki Fragkista
2014–15	Aiolos Karpenisi	1–0	APOK Velouchi
2015–16	AO Potamia	2–1	Panagrafiotikos
2016–17	Aiolos Karpenisi	1–0	APOK Velouchi
2017–18	APOK Velouchi	2–0	Aiolos Karpenisi
2018–19	AO Potamia	3–0	APO Dytiki Fragkista
2019–20	AO Potamia	draw	Aiolos Karpenisi
2020–21	Cancelled due to COVID-19		
2021–22	Aiolos Karpenisi	1–0	AO Potamia
2022–23	AO Potamia	2–1	Aiolos Karpenisi
2023–24	AO Potamia	3–2	Katsantonis Agrafa
2024–25	Katsantonis Agrafa	3–0	Doxa Raptopoulou
2025–26	Katsantonis Agrafa	2–2 (8–7 p)	APOK Velouchi

=== Performance by club ===
Club	Titles	Seasons
APOK Velouchi	17	1991, 1992, 1993, 1994, 1996, 1997, 1998, 1999, 2001, 2002, 2003, 2005, 2007, 2008, 2009, 2010, 2012, 2013, 2018
Aiolos Karpenisi	8	1995, 2000, 2004, 2006, 2014, 2015, 2017, 2022
AO Potamia	5	2016, 2019, 2020, 2023, 2024
Katsantonis Agrafa	2	2025, 2026
Aperantiakos Valaora	1	2011

== 2011–12 season ==
Points (Final) Team–Points–Results

- Katsantonis Agrafa 46 (68–11)
- Krendi 41 (42–16)
- Aiolos Profiti Ilia Karpenissi 40 (45–12)
- Myriki FC 35 (25–13)
- Potamia 24 (24–26)
- Aperadiakos Valaora 21 (-2 points) (20–28)
- Doxa Raptopoulo 18 (32–27)
- Fragkista 13 (19–55)
- Agios Prokopios 10 (20–48)
- Kerassovo FC 3 (12–60)

=== Final Four ===
As of 21 April 2012

==== Semi-finals ====
- Myriki-Katsandonis 0–2, 1–1
- Aiolos-Krendi 1–1, 2–2

==== Final ====
- Karpenissi Public Stadium (Apr 22 & 28, 2012)
- Aiolos Profiti Ilia-Katsandonis Agrafa

=== Cup Final ===
- Velouchi Karpenisi-Katsandoni Agrafa 6–0
