= Stylida F.C. =

Greek football club

Stylida
- Full name: A.O. Stylida
- Founded: 1964; 62 years ago
- Ground: Stylida Municipal Stadium
- Capacity: 920
- Chairman: Georgios Kyriakidis
- Manager: Georgios Kyriakidis
- League: Phthiotis FCA Second Division
- 2025–26: Phthiotis FCA First Division, 13th (relegated)
- Website: https://aos64.webnode.gr/
Home colours	Away colours

Stylida Football Club is a Greek football club, based in Stylida, Phthiotis, Greece.

== Honours ==
=== Domestic Titles and honours ===
  - Phthiotis FCA Champion: 10
    - 1966–67, 1968–69, 1970–71, 1985–86, 2000–01, 2002–03, 2012–13, 2017–18, 2022–23, 2024–25
  - Phthiotis FCA Cup Winners: 3
    - 1979–80, 1987–88, 2001–02
  - Phthiotis FCA Super Cup Winners: 1
    - 2018
