= Opountios F.C. =

Opountios
- Full name: Athlitikos Syllogos Opountios Martino
- Founded: 1932; 94 years ago
- Ground: Martino Municipal Stadium
- Chairman: Pavlos Pylias
- Manager: Andreas Martineos
- League: Phthiotis FCA First Division
- 2025–26: Phthiotis FCA First Division, 4th

Opountios Football Club (Greek: Αθλητικός Σύλλογος Οπούντιος Μαρτίνου) is a Greek football club, based in Martino, Phthiotis.

== Honours ==
=== Domestic Titles and honours ===
  - Phthiotis FCA Champions: 4
    - 2006–07, 2013–14, 2016–17, 2019–20
  - Phthiotis FCA Cup Winners: 2
    - 2015–16, 2019–20
  - Phthiotis FCA Super Cup Winners: 2
    - 2015, 2017
