= 1995–96 Gamma Ethniki =

Gamma Ethniki
- Season: 1995–96
- Champions: Panetolikos (South); Niki Volos (North)
- Promoted: Panetolikos; Pyrgos; Niki Volos; Panserraikos
- Relegated: Fostiras; Chaidari; Pannafpliakos; Chalkida; Chania; Charavgiakos; Apollon Krya Vrysi; Pontioi Veria; Kozani; Eordaikos; Velissario; Fokikos

The 1995–96 Gamma Ethniki was the 13th season since the official establishment of the third tier of Greek football in 1983. Panetolikos and Niki Volos were crowned champions in Southern and Northern Group respectively, thus winning promotion to Beta Ethniki. Pyrgos and Panserraikos also won promotion as a runners-up of the groups.

Fostiras, Chaidari, Pannafpliakos, Chalkida, Chania, Charavgiakos, Apollon Krya Vrysi, Pontioi Veria, Kozani, Eordaikos, Velissario and Fokikos were relegated to Delta Ethniki.

== Southern Group ==
=== League table ===
Pos	Team	Pld	W	D	L	GF	GA	GD	Pts	Promotion or relegation
1	Panetolikos (C, P)	34	20	7	7	61	33	+28	67	Promotion to Beta Ethniki
2	Pyrgos (P)	34	20	3	11	54	34	+20	63	Promotion to Beta Ethniki
3	Ethnikos Asteras	34	17	7	10	50	31	+19	58	
4	Panegialios	34	15	7	12	45	33	+12	52	
5	Aiolikos	34	15	6	13	54	44	+10	51	
6	Varvasiakos	34	13	9	12	32	32	0	48	
7	Agios Nikolaos	34	14	6	14	48	50	−2	48	
8	Marko	34	13	9	12	52	44	+8	48	
9	Atromitos	34	13	8	13	41	44	−3	47	
10	Kallithea	34	11	14	9	38	30	+8	47	
11	Korinthos	34	13	8	13	34	36	−2	47	
12	Enosis Rodos-Diagoras	34	13	8	13	38	53	−15	47	
13	Fostiras (R)	34	11	11	12	38	42	−4	44	Relegation to Delta Ethniki
14	Chaidari (R)	34	11	11	12	49	48	+1	44	Relegation to Delta Ethniki
15	Pannafpliakos (R)	34	12	5	17	44	58	−14	41	Relegation to Delta Ethniki
16	Chalkida (R)	34	12	4	18	47	61	−14	40	Relegation to Delta Ethniki
17	Chania (Note: Chania and Charavgiakos had 3 points deducted.) (R)	34	10	8	16	31	45	−14	35	Relegation to Delta Ethniki
18	Charavgiakos (R)	34	5	5	24	37	71	−34	17	Relegation to Delta Ethniki

(C) Champions; (P) Promoted; (R) Relegated

== Northern Group ==
=== League table ===
Pos	Team	Pld	W	D	L	GF	GA	GD	Pts	Promotion or relegation
1	Niki Volos (C, P)	34	19	10	5	48	23	+25	67 (Note: Niki Volos was finished first in the standings due to better head-to-head score against Panserraikos (1–0 and 1–1).)	Promotion to Beta Ethniki
2	Panserraikos (P)	34	19	10	5	59	30	+29	67	Promotion to Beta Ethniki
3	Apollon Larissa	34	18	6	10	43	36	+7	60	
4	Anagennisi Giannitsa	34	16	10	8	62	30	+32	58	
5	Nigrita	34	14	14	6	42	27	+15	56	
6	Lamia	34	16	7	11	46	34	+12	55	
7	Ampelokipi	34	14	12	8	50	35	+15	54	
8	Olympiacos Volos	34	14	8	12	48	42	+6	50	
9	Orestis Orestiada	34	14	8	12	42	28	+14	50	
10	Almopos Aridea	34	13	8	13	44	45	−1	47	
11	Tyrnavos	34	13	8	13	43	45	−2	47	
12	Agrotikos Asteras	34	12	11	11	39	39	0	47	
13	Apollon Krya Vrysi (R)	34	14	4	16	53	52	+1	46	Relegation to Delta Ethniki
14	Pontioi Veria (R)	34	10	6	18	40	66	−26	36	Relegation to Delta Ethniki
15	Kozani (R)	34	7	11	16	36	57	−21	32	Relegation to Delta Ethniki
16	Eordaikos (R)	34	5	13	16	25	50	−25	28	Relegation to Delta Ethniki
17	Velissario (Note: Velissario and Fokikos had 3 points deducted.) (R)	34	6	4	24	29	65	−36	19	Relegation to Delta Ethniki
18	Fokikos (R)	34	3	8	23	15	63	−48	14	Relegation to Delta Ethniki

(C) Champions; (P) Promoted; (R) Relegated
