= Aris Agios Konstantinos =

- Full name: Athlitikos Omlios Aris Agios Konstantinos
- Founded: 1931; 95 years ago
- Ground: Municipal Stadium of Agios Konstantinos
- Capacity: 300
- Chairman: Konstantinos Psathas
- Manager: Christos Vellios
- League: Phthiotis FCA First Division
- 2025–26: Phthiotis FCA First Division, 3rd
Home colours

Aris Agios Konstantinos (Άρης Αγίου Κωνσταντίνου) are a sporting club in the town of Agios Konstantinos in Fthiotida, Greece. They were created in 1931 and took the name from Aris, a soccer club from Thessaloniki who won the championship that year. Their greatest time in history was their participation in the National Second Division twice.

== Distinctions ==
The team participated 11 times in the lower levels of the national championships, the team won the Fthiotida local championship seven times.

=== Beta Ethniki (Second Division) ===
The team participated in the division in the 1961–62 season, when they were fourth group of the "northern group", they were finished 8th with 15 points and during the 1970–71 season, when they were playing in the Second Group, they finished 18th with 46 points.

=== National Amateur Championships (now the Third Division) ===
The team participated for two years during the 1977–78 season in the 3rd Group (ranked 6th with 44 points) and in the 1978–79 season again in the 3rd Group with 19th place with 18 points.

=== Delta Ethniki (Fourth Division) ===
The team participated 7 times in the Fourth Division, here were the results:

Season	Group	Place	Points
1989–90	3rd	15th	31
1990–91	5th	8th	47
1991–92	8th	14th	37
1993–94	8th	6th	57
1994–95	5th	14th	40
2006–07	4th	3rd	61
2007–08	4th	14th	42

=== Local championships ===
Aris won the championship 5 times in the Fthiotida-Fokida (Phocis) Championship (1968, 1969, 1970, 1972 and 1977), and twice in the Fthiotida Championship (1989 and 2006).

== 2011–12 season ==
In 2012, Aris with coach Kostas Tsikas got their Phthiotis cup for their first time.

== Sources ==
- The electronic archive at "Athlitiko Icho"
