= Pallamiaki =

Pallamiaki (Greek: Παλλαμιακή) is a Greek association football club formed on 14 March 1928 and based in Lamia. Its colours are yellow and black.

The team reached the Greek second division's central group in the 1959–60 season and was ranked 6th. A year later (1960-61 season), they finished 4th in the same group. and in the 1962–63 season Pallamiaki finished 10th in Group 4 of Beta Ethniki, narrowly escaping relegation by better goal difference.

In summer 1963, Pallamiakos and Olympiacos Lamia were merged to form Lamiakos, which was renamed to Lamia in 1964.

== Titles ==
- Total: 10 (championship), 4 (cup)
  - Fthiotida and Fokida FCA: 9 (championship), 2 (cup)
    - Championship: 1955, 1957, 1959, 1960, 1961, 1964, 1978, 1980, 1983
    - Cup: 1979, 1983
  - Fthiotida FCA: 1 (championship), 2 (cup)
    - Championship: 1988
    - Cup: 1986, 1987
