= Dimitrios Kokkinakis =

Greek footballer

Personal information
- Date of birth: 8 August 1929
- Date of death: 22 October 2014 (aged 85)
- Position: Forward

Senior career*
Years	Team	Apps	(Gls)
–1952	Niki Volos		
1952–1955	Olympiacos	23	(5)
1955–	Niki Volos		

International career
1954	Greece	3	(1)
- * Club domestic league appearances and goals

Dimitrios Kokkinakis (Greek: Δημήτριος Κοκκινάκης; 8 August 1929 – 22 October 2014) was a Greek footballer. He played in three matches for the Greece national football team in 1954. He was also part of Greece's team for their qualification matches for the 1954 FIFA World Cup.
