= Nea Ionia, Magnesia =

Nea Ionia Νέα Ιωνία
- Municipal unit
- Location within the regional unit

- Location within Greece
- Coordinates: 39°22′N 22°56′E
- Country: Greece
- Administrative region: Thessaly
- Regional unit: Magnesia
- Municipality: Volos

Area
  - Municipal unit: 63.3 km^{2} (24.4 sq mi)
- Elevation: 18 m (59 ft)

Population (2021)
  - Municipal unit: 31,884
  - Municipal unit density: 504/km^{2} (1,300/sq mi)
  - Community: 31,684
- Time zone: UTC+2 (EET)
  - Summer (DST): UTC+3 (EEST)
- Postal code: 3844x
- Area code: 24210
- Vehicle registration: ΒΟ
- Website: http://www.neaionia-magnesia.gr/

Nea Ionia (Greek: Νέα Ιωνία, meaning New Ionia) is a city and a former municipality in Magnesia, Thessaly, Greece. Since the 2011 local government reform it is part of the municipality Volos, of which it is a municipal unit. It borders the city of Volos. The population at the 2021 census was 31,884 inhabitants. Its land area is 63.314 km². The name "New Ionia" refers to refugees from western Anatolia that settled in the area after the Greco-Turkish War (1919-1922).

== Sporting Teams ==
- Niki Volos F.C.

== Sites of interest ==
- Panthessaliko Stadium, Athens 2004 venue
- Museum of Greek Resistance, Christou Louli str. 33A
