= 1984–85 Gamma Ethniki =

Gamma Ethniki
- Season: 1984–85
- Champions: Panetolikos (South); Kilkisiakos (North)
- Promoted: Panetolikos; Ionikos; Kilkisiakos; Naoussa
- Relegated: Chania; Nikaia; Panegialios; Aias Salamina; Florina; Elassona; Aspida Xanthi; Alexandroupolis; Anagennisi Epanomi

The 1984–85 Gamma Ethniki was the second season since the official establishment of the third tier of Greek football in 1983. Panetolikos and Kilkisiakos were crowned champions in Southern and Northern Group respectively, thus winning promotion to Beta Ethniki. Ionikos and Naoussa also won promotion as a runners-up of the groups.

Chania, Nikaia Panegialios, Aias Salamina, Florina, Elassona, Aspida Xanthi, Alexandroupolis and Anagennisi Epanomi were relegated to Delta Ethniki.

== Southern Group ==
=== League table ===
Pos	Team	Pld	W	D	L	GF	GA	GD	Pts	Promotion or relegation
1	Panetolikos (C, P)	40	21	14	5	64	28	+36	56	Promotion to Beta Ethniki
2	Ionikos (P)	40	23	9	8	69	37	+32	55	Promotion to Beta Ethniki
3	Thriamvos (Note: Thriamvos had 1 point deducted.)	39	18	14	7	38	30	+8	49	
4	Ethnikos Asteras	40	20	6	14	68	56	+12	46	
5	Kallithea	40	16	13	11	58	44	+14	45	
6	Charavgiakos	40	19	6	15	48	37	+11	44	
7	Anagennisi Arta	40	17	10	13	52	46	+6	44	
8	Panarkadikos	40	16	11	13	46	39	+7	43	
9	Pannafpliakos	40	16	11	13	45	45	0	43	
10	Panelefsiniakos	40	16	9	15	60	41	+19	41	
11	Vyzas	40	15	11	14	44	45	−1	41	
12	Fostiras	40	13	12	15	40	36	+4	38	
13	Chalkida	40	13	12	15	43	45	−2	38	
14	Kerkyra	40	15	8	17	49	59	−10	38	
15	Neapolis	40	13	11	16	53	52	+1	37	
16	Paniliakos	40	13	11	16	42	53	−11	37	
17	Irodotos (O)	40	13	10	17	36	46	−10	36	Qualification for relegation play-off
18	Chania (R)	40	10	11	19	39	53	−14	31	Relegation to Delta Ethniki
19	Nikaia (R)	40	11	8	21	48	70	−22	30	Relegation to Delta Ethniki
20	Panegialios (R)	40	7	11	22	36	73	−37	25	Relegation to Delta Ethniki
21	Aias Salamina (Note: ?7 or 8 points deducted?) (R)	35	8	6	21	32	75	−43	14	Relegation to Delta Ethniki

(C) Champions; (O) Play-off winners; (P) Promoted; (R) Relegated

== Northern Group ==
=== League table ===
Pos	Team	Pld	W	D	L	GF	GA	GD	Pts	Promotion or relegation
1	Kilkisiakos (C, P)	40	25	10	5	73	27	+46	60	Promotion to Beta Ethniki
2	Naoussa (P)	40	25	6	9	70	30	+40	56	Promotion to Beta Ethniki
3	Olympiacos Volos	40	24	6	10	58	32	+26	54	
4	Anagennisi Karditsa	40	18	10	12	59	42	+17	46	
5	Ethnikos Alexandroupoli	40	17	8	15	48	45	+3	42	
6	Thiva	40	17	8	15	45	47	−2	42	
7	Anagennisi Giannitsa	40	15	11	14	63	63	0	41	
8	Kozani	40	18	4	18	48	45	+3	40	
9	Langadas	40	17	6	17	52	55	−3	40	
10	Lamia	40	14	12	14	50	53	−3	40	
11	Niki Volos (Note: Niki Volos had 1 point deducted.)	40	18	4	18	62	44	+18	39	
12	Poseidon Nea Michaniona	40	14	10	16	47	51	−4	38	
13	Iraklis Kavala	40	13	12	15	35	42	−7	38	
14	Odysseas Kordelio	40	16	6	18	49	59	−10	38	
15	Polykastro	40	10	17	13	53	51	+2	37	
16	Eordaikos	40	14	9	17	47	49	−2	37	
17	Florina (R)	40	11	11	18	44	57	−13	33	Qualification for relegation play-off
18	Elassona (R)	40	12	8	20	39	60	−21	32	Relegation to Delta Ethniki
19	Aspida Xanthi (R)	40	9	12	19	35	60	−25	30	Relegation to Delta Ethniki
20	Alexandroupolis (Note: Alexandroupolis had 10 points deducted.) (R)	40	12	11	17	50	63	−13	25	Relegation to Delta Ethniki
21	Anagennisi Epanomi (R)	40	7	7	26	32	84	−52	21	Relegation to Delta Ethniki

(C) Champions; (P) Promoted; (R) Relegated

== Relegation play-off ==
Team 1	Score	Team 2
Irodotos	2–0	Florina
