= 1986–87 Gamma Ethniki =

Gamma Ethniki
- Season: 1986–87
- Champions: Chalkida (South); Edessaikos (North)
- Promoted: Chalkida; Kallithea; Edessaikos; Naoussa
- Relegated: Fostiras; Patras; Thiva; Peramaikos; Thriamvos; Vyzas; Paniliakos; Anagennisi Giannitsa; Pyrsos Grevena; Achilleas Farsala; Panthrakikos; Langadas; Megas Alexandros Alexandria

The 1986–87 Gamma Ethniki was the fourth season since the official establishment of the third tier of Greek football in 1983. Chalkida and Edessaikos were crowned champions in Southern and Northern Group respectively, thus winning promotion to Beta Ethniki. Kallithea and Naoussa also won promotion as a runners-up of the groups.

Fostiras, Patras, Thiva, Peramaikos, Thriamvos, Vyzas, Paniliakos, Anagennisi Giannitsa, Pyrsos Grevena, Achilleas Farsala, Panthrakikos, Langadas and Megas Alexandros Alexandria were relegated to Delta Ethniki.

== Southern Group ==
=== League table ===
Pos	Team	Pld	W	D	L	GF	GA	GD	Pts	Promotion or relegation
1	Chalkida (Note: Chalkida, Kerkyra, Pannafpliakos and Peramaikos 1 point deducted.) (C, P)	38	26	9	3	82	13	+69	60	Promotion to Beta Ethniki
2	Kallithea (Note: Kallithea, Irodotos and Thiva had 2 points deducted.) (P)	38	20	12	6	60	37	+23	50	Promotion to Beta Ethniki
3	Panarkadikos	38	22	4	12	62	35	+27	48	
4	Irodotos	38	19	10	9	49	22	+27	46	
5	Rodos	38	16	11	11	52	39	+13	43	
6	Kalamata	38	17	9	12	51	47	+4	43	
7	Ethnikos Asteras (Note: Ethnikos Asteras had 3 points deducted.)	38	18	9	11	51	35	+16	42	
8	Ergotelis	38	15	10	13	49	43	+6	40	
9	Panelefsiniakos	38	14	11	13	49	35	+14	39	
10	Panargiakos	38	15	9	14	53	52	+1	39	
11	Aiolikos	38	12	13	13	48	43	+5	37	
12	Kerkyra	38	16	6	16	44	51	−7	37	
13	Pannafpliakos	38	14	10	14	34	42	−8	37	
14	Fostiras (R)	38	12	10	16	37	50	−13	34	Relegation to Delta Ethniki
15	Patras (R)	38	9	14	15	35	49	−14	32	Relegation to Delta Ethniki
16	Thiva (R)	38	9	8	21	33	65	−32	24	Relegation to Delta Ethniki
17	Peramaikos (R)	38	9	5	24	29	71	−42	22	Relegation to Delta Ethniki
18	Thriamvos (Note: Thriamvos had 9 points deducted.) (R)	38	12	7	19	46	61	−15	22	Relegation to Delta Ethniki
19	Vyzas (R)	38	7	6	25	25	69	−44	20	Relegation to Delta Ethniki
20	Paniliakos (Note: Paniliakos had 5 points deducted.) (R)	38	8	7	23	24	53	−29	18	Relegation to Delta Ethniki

(C) Champions; (P) Promoted; (R) Relegated

== Northern Group ==
=== League table ===
Pos	Team	Pld	W	D	L	GF	GA	GD	Pts	Promotion or relegation
1	Edessaikos (C, P)	38	20	8	10	58	34	+24	48	Promotion to Beta Ethniki
2	Naoussa (P)	38	16	16	6	49	29	+20	48	Promotion to Beta Ethniki
3	Niki Volos	38	19	9	10	64	32	+32	47	
4	Lamia	38	20	4	14	62	36	+26	44	
5	Anagennisi Arta	38	17	9	12	45	33	+12	43	
6	Anagennisi Karditsa (Note: Anagennisi Karditsa had 6 points deducted.)	38	19	10	9	69	31	+38	42	
7	Kozani	38	17	7	14	59	55	+4	41	
8	Eordaikos (Note: Eordaikos had 3 points deducted.)	38	16	10	12	47	34	+13	39	
9	Agrotikos Asteras	38	17	5	16	51	55	−4	39	
10	Alexandreia	38	14	10	14	36	44	−8	38	
11	Polykastro	38	13	12	13	35	53	−18	38	
12	Ethnikos Alexandroupoli	38	13	11	14	54	44	+10	37	
13	Olympiakos Chalkida (Note: Olympiakos Chalkida had 1 point deducted.)	38	15	8	15	44	51	−7	37	
14	Nestos Chrysoupoli	38	13	11	14	37	51	−14	37	
15	Anagennisi Giannitsa (R)	33	15	4	14	53	43	+10	34	Relegation to Delta Ethniki
16	Pyrsos Grevena (R)	38	13	8	17	39	56	−17	34	Relegation to Delta Ethniki
17	Achilleas Farsala (R)	38	9	11	18	33	49	−16	29	Relegation to Delta Ethniki
18	Panthrakikos (R)	38	11	6	21	46	72	−26	28	Relegation to Delta Ethniki
19	Langadas (R)	38	5	11	22	26	62	−36	21	Relegation to Delta Ethniki
20	Megas Alexandros Alexandria (Note: Megas Alexandros Alexandria had 5 points deducted.) (R)	38	5	11	22	38	81	−43	16	Relegation to Delta Ethniki

(C) Champions; (P) Promoted; (R) Relegated
