= 1983–84 Gamma Ethniki =

Gamma Ethniki
- Season: 1983–84
- Champions: Aiolikos (South); Almopos Aridea (North)
- Promoted: Aiolikos; Athinaikos; Almopos Aridea; Trikala
- Relegated: Pannafpliakos; Atromitos Piraeus; Ilisiakos; Achaiki; Panthrakikos; Pontioi Kozani; Toxotis Volos

The 1983–84 Gamma Ethniki was the first and inaugural season since the official establishment of the third tier of Greek football in 1983. Aiolikos and Almopos Aridea were crowned champions in Southern and Northern groups, respectively, thus winning promotion to Beta Ethniki. Athinaikos and Trikala also won promotion as a runners-up of the groups.

Pannafpliakos, Atromitos Piraeus, Ilisiakos, Achaiki, Panthrakikos, Pontioi Kozani and Toxotis Volos were relegated to Delta Ethniki.

== Southern group ==
=== League table ===
| Pos | Team | Pld | W | D | L | GF | GA | GD | Pts | Promotion or relegation |
|---|---|---|---|---|---|---|---|---|---|---|
| 1 | Aiolikos (C, P) | 38 | 22 | 7 | 9 | 73 | 43 | +30 | 51 | Promotion to Beta Ethniki |
| 2 | Athinaikos (P) | 38 | 21 | 9 | 8 | 52 | 28 | +24 | 51 | Promotion to Beta Ethniki |
| 3 | Ionikos | 38 | 20 | 9 | 9 | 60 | 40 | +20 | 49 | |
| 4 | Irodotos | 38 | 17 | 9 | 12 | 52 | 40 | +12 | 43 | |
| 5 | Vyzas | 38 | 14 | 14 | 10 | 60 | 48 | +12 | 42 | |
| 6 | Panelefsiniakos | 38 | 16 | 8 | 14 | 56 | 45 | +11 | 40 | |
| 7 | Kallithea (Note: ?3 bonus points?) | 38 | 14 | 12 | 12 | 52 | 40 | +12 | 43 | |
| 8 | Anagennisi Arta | 38 | 14 | 11 | 13 | 49 | 34 | +15 | 39 | |
| 9 | Panegialios | 38 | 15 | 9 | 14 | 39 | 42 | −3 | 39 | |
| 10 | Nikaia | 38 | 15 | 8 | 15 | 48 | 55 | −7 | 38 | |
| 11 | Neapolis | 38 | 13 | 12 | 13 | 40 | 55 | −15 | 38 | |
| 12 | Fostiras | 38 | 15 | 7 | 16 | 55 | 52 | +3 | 37 | |
| 13 | Thriamvos | 38 | 13 | 10 | 15 | 45 | 46 | −1 | 36 | |
| 14 | Chania | 38 | 13 | 10 | 15 | 34 | 38 | −4 | 36 | |
| 15 | Ethnikos Asteras | 38 | 16 | 4 | 18 | 52 | 62 | −10 | 36 | |
| 16 | Paniliakos | 38 | 13 | 10 | 15 | 34 | 53 | −19 | 36 | |
| 17 | Pannafpliakos (R) | 38 | 15 | 4 | 19 | 49 | 45 | +4 | 34 | Qualification for Relegation play-off |
| 18 | Atromitos Piraeus (R) | 38 | 11 | 12 | 15 | 38 | 43 | −5 | 34 | Relegation to Delta Ethniki |
| 19 | Ilisiakos (R) | 38 | 7 | 9 | 22 | 38 | 71 | −33 | 23 | Relegation to Delta Ethniki |
| 20 | Achaiki (Note: Achaiki had 7 points deducted.) (R) | 33 | 6 | 6 | 21 | 23 | 65 | −42 | 11 | Relegation to Delta Ethniki |

(C) Champions; (P) Promoted; (R) Relegated

== Northern group ==
=== League table ===
| Pos | Team | Pld | W | D | L | GF | GA | GD | Pts | Promotion or relegation |
|---|---|---|---|---|---|---|---|---|---|---|
| 1 | Almopos Aridea (C, P) | 40 | 22 | 6 | 12 | 63 | 44 | +19 | 50 | Promotion to Beta Ethniki |
| 2 | Trikala (P) | 40 | 20 | 9 | 11 | 53 | 32 | +21 | 49 | Promotion to Beta Ethniki |
| 3 | Eordaikos | 40 | 20 | 8 | 12 | 57 | 41 | +16 | 48 | |
| 4 | Ethnikos Alexandroupoli | 40 | 15 | 13 | 12 | 51 | 42 | +9 | 43 | |
| 5 | Polykastro | 40 | 17 | 8 | 15 | 47 | 40 | +7 | 42 | |
| 6 | Anagennisi Giannitsa | 40 | 12 | 17 | 11 | 57 | 53 | +4 | 41 | |
| 7 | Thiva | 38 | 16 | 9 | 13 | 49 | 47 | +2 | 41 | |
| 8 | Alexandroupolis | 40 | 14 | 12 | 14 | 59 | 50 | +9 | 40 | |
| 9 | Lamia | 40 | 16 | 8 | 16 | 53 | 44 | +9 | 40 | |
| 10 | Kilkisiakos | 40 | 14 | 11 | 15 | 45 | 50 | −5 | 39 | |
| 11 | Naoussa | 40 | 16 | 7 | 17 | 37 | 44 | −7 | 39 | |
| 12 | Florina | 40 | 16 | 7 | 17 | 37 | 58 | −21 | 39 | |
| 13 | Kozani (Note: Kozani and Anagennisi Karditsa had 10 points deducted.) | 40 | 20 | 8 | 12 | 60 | 45 | +15 | 38 | |
| 14 | Odysseas Kordelio | 40 | 16 | 6 | 18 | 52 | 51 | +1 | 38 | |
| 15 | Aspida Xanthi | 40 | 16 | 6 | 18 | 39 | 46 | −7 | 38 | |
| 16 | Langadas | 40 | 17 | 4 | 19 | 45 | 54 | −9 | 38 | |
| 17 | Anagennisi Epanomi (O) | 40 | 11 | 14 | 15 | 34 | 42 | −8 | 36 | Qualification for Relegation play-off |
| 18 | Panthrakikos (R) | 40 | 11 | 13 | 16 | 41 | 46 | −5 | 35 | Relegation to Delta Ethniki |
| 19 | Pontioi Kozani (R) | 40 | 9 | 13 | 18 | 39 | 50 | −11 | 31 | Relegation to Delta Ethniki |
| 20 | Anagennisi Karditsa | 40 | 17 | 5 | 18 | 47 | 51 | −4 | 29 | Spared from relegation |
| 21 | Toxotis Volos (R) | 40 | 9 | 8 | 23 | 46 | 81 | −35 | 26 | Relegation to Delta Ethniki |

(C) Champions; (O) Play-off winners; (P) Promoted; (R) Relegated

== Relegation play-off ==
| Team 1 | Score | Team 2 |
|---|---|---|
| Pannafpliakos | 1–1 (6–7 p) | Anagennisi Epanomi |
