= 1982–83 Beta Ethniki =

Beta Ethniki
- Season: 1982–83
- Dates: 15 September 1982 – 12 July 1983
- Champions: Egaleo (South); Apollon Kalamarias (North)
- Promoted: Egaleo; Apollon Kalamarias
- Relegated: Aiolikos; Panelefsiniakos; Panegialios; Ethnikos Asteras; Irodotos; Chania; Ionikos; Achaiki; Vyzas; Atromitos Piraeus; Fostiras; Paniliakos; Kozani; Langadas; Panthrakikos; Kilkisiakos; Trikala; Eordaikos; Thiva; Naoussa; AO Alexandroupolis; AE Florina; Anagennisi Giannitsa

Beta Ethniki 1982–83 complete season.

== South Group ==
=== League table ===
Pos	Team	Pld	W	D	L	GF	GA	GD	Pts	Promotion or relegation
1	Egaleo (C, P)	38	24	7	7	72	39	+33	55	Promotion to Alpha Ethniki
2	Diagoras Rodos	38	23	8	7	69	32	+37	54	
3	Panetolikos	38	21	6	11	53	33	+20	48	
4	Chalkida	38	18	10	10	63	32	+31	46	
5	Korinthos	38	21	5	12	51	35	+16	46 (Note: Korinthos had 1 point deducted.)	
6	Acharnaikos	38	19	6	13	60	38	+22	44	
7	Proodeftiki	38	17	10	11	55	39	+16	44	
8	Atromitos	38	19	6	13	56	41	+15	44	
9	Aiolikos (R)	38	17	8	13	60	48	+12	42	Qualification for Relegation play-off
10	Panelefsiniakos (R)	38	18	6	14	45	36	+9	42	Relegation to Gamma Ethniki
11	Panegialios (R)	38	18	5	15	44	37	+7	41 (Note: ?1 or 0 point deducted?)	Relegation to Gamma Ethniki
12	Ethnikos Asteras (R)	38	15	6	17	50	57	−7	36	Relegation to Gamma Ethniki
13	Irodotos (R)	38	13	8	17	49	64	−15	34	Relegation to Gamma Ethniki
14	Chania (R)	38	13	6	19	54	55	−1	32	Relegation to Gamma Ethniki
15	Ionikos (R)	38	9	13	16	52	74	−22	31	Relegation to Gamma Ethniki
16	Achaiki (R)	38	9	11	18	34	54	−20	29	Relegation to Gamma Ethniki
17	Vyzas (R)	38	11	5	22	37	68	−31	27	Relegation to Gamma Ethniki
18	Atromitos Piraeus (R)	38	9	8	21	30	61	−31	26	Relegation to Gamma Ethniki
19	Fostiras (R)	38	6	11	21	33	64	−31	23	Relegation to Gamma Ethniki
20	Paniliakos (R)	38	5	5	28	31	91	−60	15	Relegation to Gamma Ethniki

(C) Champions; (P) Promoted; (R) Relegated

=== Ninth place play-off ===
Team 1	Score	Team 2
Aiolikos	3–0	Panelefsiniakos

== North Group ==
=== League table ===
Pos	Team	Pld	W	D	L	GF	GA	GD	Pts	Promotion or relegation
1	Apollon Kalamarias (C, P)	38	22	8	8	56	31	+25	52	Promotion to Alpha Ethniki
2	Agrotikos Asteras	38	20	10	8	73	38	+35	50	
3	Kavala	38	21	7	10	54	26	+28	49	
4	Veria	38	17	12	9	67	35	+32	46	
5	Olympiacos Volos	38	18	9	11	52	29	+23	45	
6	Xanthi	38	19	7	12	50	35	+15	45	
7	Pierikos	38	18	9	11	52	42	+10	45	
8	Levadiakos	38	20	4	14	58	47	+11	44	
9	Niki Volos (O)	38	16	11	11	45	43	+2	43	Qualification for Relegation play-off
10	Kozani (R)	38	17	6	15	60	49	+11	40	Relegation to Gamma Ethniki
11	Langadas (R)	38	13	10	15	34	48	−14	36	Relegation to Gamma Ethniki
12	Panthrakikos (R)	38	15	6	17	38	44	−6	36	Relegation to Gamma Ethniki
13	Kilkisiakos (R)	38	14	6	18	46	58	−12	34	Relegation to Gamma Ethniki
14	Trikala (R)	38	13	7	18	51	54	−3	33	Relegation to Gamma Ethniki
15	Eordaikos (R)	38	11	11	16	33	52	−19	33	Relegation to Gamma Ethniki
16	Thiva (R)	38	10	9	19	39	48	−9	29	Relegation to Gamma Ethniki
17	Naoussa (R)	37	9	11	17	27	55	−28	29	Relegation to Gamma Ethniki
18	AO Alexandroupolis (R)	38	11	4	23	32	63	−31	26	Relegation to Gamma Ethniki
19	AE Florina (R)	38	9	6	23	37	75	−38	24	Relegation to Gamma Ethniki
20	Anagennisi Giannitsa (R)	38	8	5	25	31	62	−31	21	Relegation to Gamma Ethniki

(C) Champions; (O) Play-off winners; (P) Promoted; (R) Relegated

== Relegation play-off ==
Team 1	Score	Team 2
Niki Volos	2–2 (3–2 p)	Aiolikos
