= Georgios Skatharoudis =

Greek footballer

Personal information
- Full name: Georgios Skatharoudis
- Date of birth: 2 November 1992 (age 34)
- Place of birth: Thessaloniki, Greece
- Height: 1.82 m (6 ft 0 in)
- Position: Striker

Team information
- Current team: Kavala
- Number: 30

Youth career
- Veria

Senior career*
Years	Team	Apps	(Gls)
2009–2013	Veria	49	(0)
2013	→ Anagennisi Giannitsa (loan)	12	(3)
2013–2014	Zakynthos	21	(5)
2014–2015	Tyrnavos	3	(0)
2015	Acharnaikos	16	(0)
2015–2016	Anagennisi Karditsa	21	(2)
2016–2017	Chalkida		
2017	Langadas		
2017–2018	Edessaikos		
2018–2020	Veria		
2020–	Kavala	7	(1)
- * Club domestic league appearances and goals as of 12 August 2020

Georgios Skatharoudis (Greek: Γεώργιος Σκαθαρούδης; born 2 November 1992) is a Greek professional footballer who plays as a striker.

== Honours ==
Veria

- Gamma Ethniki: 2018–19
