= 1991–92 Gamma Ethniki =

Gamma Ethniki
- Season: 1991–92
- Champions: Panetolikos (South); Pontioi Veria (North)
- Promoted: Panetolikos; Proodeftiki; Pontioi Veria; Eordaikos
- Relegated: Patras; Messolonghi; Thriamvos; Fostiras; Enosis Aris-Neapolis; Preveza; Kyriakiou; Niki Volos; Neoi Epivates; Panargiakos; Kozani; Anagennisi Neapoli

The 1991–92 Gamma Ethniki was the ninth season since the official establishment of the third tier of Greek football in 1983. Panetolikos and Pontioi Veria were crowned champions in Southern and Northern Group respectively, thus winning promotion to Beta Ethniki. Proodeftiki and Eordaikos also won promotion as a runners-up of the groups.

Patras, Messolonghi, Thriamvos, Fostiras, Enosis Aris-Neapolis, Preveza, Kyriakiou, Niki Volos, Neoi Epivates, Panargiakos, Kozani and Anagennisi Neapoli were relegated to Delta Ethniki.

== Southern Group ==
=== League table ===
| Pos | Team | Pld | W | D | L | GF | GA | GD | Pts | Promotion or relegation |
|---|---|---|---|---|---|---|---|---|---|---|
| 1 | Panetolikos (C, P) | 34 | 19 | 8 | 7 | 50 | 27 | +23 | 46 | Promotion to Beta Ethniki |
| 2 | Proodeftiki (P) | 34 | 18 | 9 | 7 | 45 | 22 | +23 | 45 | Promotion to Beta Ethniki |
| 3 | Ilisiakos | 30 | 20 | 5 | 5 | 42 | 18 | +24 | 45 | |
| 4 | Chaidari | 34 | 16 | 11 | 7 | 46 | 29 | +17 | 43 | |
| 5 | Panelefsiniakos | 34 | 13 | 11 | 10 | 48 | 45 | +3 | 37 | |
| 6 | Sparti | 34 | 15 | 7 | 12 | 37 | 36 | +1 | 37 | |
| 7 | Poseidon Heraklion | 34 | 12 | 10 | 12 | 40 | 37 | +3 | 34 | |
| 8 | Kalamata | 34 | 12 | 10 | 12 | 30 | 30 | 0 | 34 | |
| 9 | Paniliakos | 34 | 13 | 8 | 13 | 35 | 33 | +2 | 34 | |
| 10 | Kallithea | 34 | 14 | 5 | 15 | 40 | 43 | −3 | 33 | |
| 11 | Rodos | 34 | 13 | 7 | 14 | 46 | 45 | +1 | 33 | |
| 12 | Pannafpliakos (Note: Pannafpliakos had 2 points deducted.) | 34 | 14 | 6 | 14 | 36 | 38 | −2 | 32 | |
| 13 | Patras (R) | 34 | 13 | 5 | 16 | 36 | 38 | −2 | 31 | Relegation to Delta Ethniki |
| 14 | Messolonghi (R) | 34 | 11 | 8 | 15 | 28 | 38 | −10 | 30 | Relegation to Delta Ethniki |
| 15 | Thriamvos (R) | 34 | 12 | 5 | 17 | 35 | 43 | −8 | 29 | Relegation to Delta Ethniki |
| 16 | Fostiras (R) | 34 | 9 | 6 | 19 | 24 | 41 | −17 | 24 | Relegation to Delta Ethniki |
| 17 | Enosis Aris-Neapolis (R) | 34 | 7 | 10 | 17 | 28 | 47 | −19 | 24 | Relegation to Delta Ethniki |
| 18 | Preveza (R) | 34 | 5 | 9 | 20 | 25 | 61 | −36 | 19 | Relegation to Delta Ethniki |

(C) Champions; (P) Promoted; (R) Relegated

== Northern Group ==
=== League table ===
| Pos | Team | Pld | W | D | L | GF | GA | GD | Pts | Promotion or relegation |
|---|---|---|---|---|---|---|---|---|---|---|
| 1 | Pontioi Veria (C, P) | 34 | 18 | 9 | 7 | 50 | 21 | +29 | 45 | Promotion to Beta Ethniki |
| 2 | Eordaikos (P) | 34 | 18 | 7 | 9 | 44 | 29 | +15 | 43 | Promotion to Beta Ethniki |
| 3 | Veria | 34 | 18 | 6 | 10 | 46 | 31 | +15 | 42 | |
| 4 | Anagennisi Arta | 34 | 15 | 8 | 11 | 48 | 42 | +6 | 38 | |
| 5 | Apollon Larissa | 34 | 12 | 13 | 9 | 36 | 26 | +10 | 37 | |
| 6 | Poseidon Nea Michaniona | 34 | 12 | 12 | 10 | 27 | 24 | +3 | 36 | |
| 7 | Makedonikos | 34 | 12 | 12 | 10 | 36 | 28 | +8 | 36 | |
| 8 | Nigrita | 34 | 13 | 10 | 11 | 35 | 32 | +3 | 36 | |
| 9 | Asteras Ambelokipoi | 34 | 10 | 15 | 9 | 39 | 24 | +15 | 35 | |
| 10 | Anagennisi Chalkidona | 34 | 10 | 15 | 9 | 26 | 28 | −2 | 35 | |
| 11 | Anagennisi Kolindros | 34 | 13 | 8 | 13 | 41 | 45 | −4 | 34 | |
| 12 | Pandramaikos | 34 | 14 | 5 | 15 | 36 | 37 | −1 | 33 | |
| 13 | Kyriakiou (R) | 34 | 10 | 11 | 13 | 40 | 43 | −3 | 31 | Relegation to Delta Ethniki |
| 14 | Niki Volos (R) | 34 | 13 | 5 | 16 | 37 | 41 | −4 | 31 | Relegation to Delta Ethniki |
| 15 | Neoi Epivates (R) | 34 | 12 | 6 | 16 | 36 | 48 | −12 | 30 | Relegation to Delta Ethniki |
| 16 | Panargiakos (R) | 34 | 11 | 5 | 18 | 21 | 42 | −21 | 27 | Relegation to Delta Ethniki |
| 17 | Kozani (R) | 34 | 10 | 5 | 19 | 28 | 38 | −10 | 25 | Relegation to Delta Ethniki |
| 18 | Anagennisi Neapoli (R) | 34 | 5 | 8 | 21 | 26 | 63 | −37 | 18 | Relegation to Delta Ethniki |

(C) Champions; (P) Promoted; (R) Relegated
