= Konstantinos Errikos =

Greek footballer (born 1991)

Personal information
- Full name: Konstantinos Errikos
- Date of birth: 11 May 1991 (age 35)
- Place of birth: Athens, Greece
- Height: 1.74 m (5 ft 9 in)
- Position: Midfielder

Team information
- Current team: Peramaikos F.C.

Youth career
- Ionikos

Senior career*
Years	Team	Apps	(Gls)
2007–2008	→ Gigenis (loan)		
2008–2011	Ionikos	15	(0)
2011–2012	Proodeftiki F.C.	9	(0)
2012	Vyzas F.C.	1	(0)
2013–	Peramaikos F.C.		
- * Club domestic league appearances and goals as of 15 September 2012

Konstantinos Errikos (Greek: Κωνσταντίνος Ερρίκος; born 11 May 1991) is a Greek professional footballer who currently plays as a midfielder for Peramaikos F.C. in the Football League 2.

== Career ==
Konstantinos Errikos has previously played for Ionikos, Proodeftiki F.C. and Vyzas F.C.
