= Ilias Papageorgiou =

Greek footballer and manager (1925–1998)

Personal information
- Date of birth: 1925
- Place of birth: Piraeus, Greece
- Date of death: 2 March 1998 (aged 72–73)
- Position: Forward

Youth career
- 1939−1943: AE Chromatourgia
- 1943−1944: Apollon Rentis

Senior career*
Years	Team	Apps	(Gls)
1944−1949	Atromitos Piraeus		
1949−1955	AEK Athens	0	(0)
1955−1959	Atromitos Piraeus		

International career
1950−1953	Greece	12	(4)
1952	Greece Olympic	1	(0)

Managerial career
- 1959: Vyzas Megara
- 1961–1963: Aris Piraeus
- 1967: Vyzas Megara
- 1970–1971: Vyzas Megara
- 1971–1972: Ionikos
- 1972–1973: Proodeftiki
- 1973: Panargiakos
- 1977: Thriamvos Athens
- * Club domestic league appearances and goals

Ilias Papageorgiou (Greek: Ηλίας Παπαγεωργίου; 1 January 1925 − 2 March 1998) was a Greek footballer who played as a forward and a later manager.

== Club career ==
Papageorgiou started football at the age of 13 in AE Chromatourgia, as outside right alongside Andreas Mouratis. In 1943 he moved to Apollon Rentis, where he played inside right, a position in which he established himself. In 1944 he joined Atromitos Piraeus where he played until 1949. Then he was called to Piraeus Mixed Team and for the first time to the National team, without making an appearance.

In 1949, he was transferred to AEK Athens without the consent of his club, as a result of which he was out of competition for two seasons according to the regulations at the time. He stayed at AEK until 1955, where in his first years he competed only in friendly matches and in 1950 he was called to the Athens Mixed Team. After leaving AEK, Papageorgiou returned to Atromitos Piraeus to end his football career.

== International career ==
Papageorgiou played 14 for Greece scoring 4 goals, between 1950 and 1953. His last international match was on 18 October 1953 against France B for the Mediterranean Cup, in a match that ended 0–0. After the game, he was banned indefinitely from the national team by the HFF for unsportsmanship behaviour throughout the match. He also competed once in the men's tournament at the 1952 Summer Olympics.

== Managerial career ==
After football, Papageorgiou involved in coaching and worked in many clubs, including Aris Piraeus, Vyzas Megara, Ionikos, Proodeftiki, Panargiakos, Atromitos Piraeus, Aias Salamina, Kallithea and Thriamvos Athens

== Personal life ==
As a professional footballer, he also worked at the Athens-Piraeus Electric Company and later at the PPC. He had married Kallirroi Boura and they had two children, Konstantinos and Nektaria.

Papageorgiou died on 2 March 1998, at the age of 73.
