= 1988–89 Gamma Ethniki =

Gamma Ethniki
- Season: 1988–89
- Champions: Edessaikos
- Promoted: Edessaikos; Sparti; Eordaikos
- Relegated: None

The 1988–89 Gamma Ethniki was the sixth season since the official establishment of the third tier of Greek football in 1983. Edessaikos was crowned champion, thus winning promotion to Beta Ethniki. Sparti and Eordaikos were also won promotion as a runner-up and a third placed team of the league.

== League table ==
Pos	Team	Pld	W	D	L	GF	GA	GD	Pts	Promotion
1	Edessaikos (C, P)	34	16	12	6	51	26	+25	44	Promotion to Beta Ethniki
2	Sparti (P)	34	17	9	8	36	25	+11	43	Promotion to Beta Ethniki
3	Eordaikos (P)	34	17	8	9	43	35	+8	42	Promotion to Beta Ethniki
4	Kozani	34	17	5	12	56	45	+11	39	
5	Anagennisi Arta	34	15	8	11	36	29	+7	38	
6	Irodotos	34	14	9	11	45	36	+9	37	
7	Acharnaikos	34	13	11	10	45	37	+8	37	
8	Kalamata	34	13	8	13	36	27	+9	34	
9	Asteras Ambelokipoi	34	10	14	10	37	38	−1	34	
10	Panarkadikos	34	11	12	11	48	45	+3	34	
11	Kilkisiakos	34	13	8	13	35	40	−5	34	
12	Egaleo	34	14	6	14	37	38	−1	34	
13	Achilleas Farsala	34	10	13	11	31	36	−5	33	
14	Proodeftiki	34	11	11	12	37	39	−2	33	
15	Anagennisi Karditsa	34	12	7	15	33	38	−5	31	
16	Thriamvos	34	9	7	18	22	43	−21	25	
17	Trikala	34	7	9	18	24	42	−18	23	
18	Chalkida	34	3	11	20	17	50	−33	17	

(C) Champions; (P) Promoted
