= Nikos Godas =

Greek footballer (1921–1948)

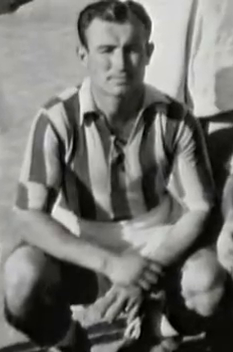

Personal information
- Date of birth: 1921
- Place of birth: Aivali
- Date of death: 19 November 1948 (aged 26–27)
- Place of death: Kerkyra, Greece
- Position: Attacking midfielder

Senior career*
Years	Team	Apps	(Gls)
- Aris Piraeus
- Keramikos Kaminion
1942-44	Olympiacos		
- Mikti Piraeus
- EPON football team
- * Club domestic league appearances and goals

Nikolaos Godas (1921 – 19 November 1948), better known as Nikos Godas, was a Greek footballer and ELAS guerilla.

== Biography ==
Born in Aivali in 1921, Godas and his family came to Greece after the Greco-Turkish war of 1922. Eventually settling in Kokkinia, his father opened a tavern where Godas worked before the Second World War.

Godas played football in the streets, and when the war began, he joined Olympiacos. He played as an attacking midfielder. He also played in the final of the 1943 Christmas Cup, which resulted in a 5–2 victory over Panathinaikos.

In that period, he was also a guerilla captain in the communist ELAS resistance group. He fought the Germans and later, during Dekemvriana, also fought the British.

He was executed during the Greek Civil War in 1948 as a communist. He was killed wearing the Olympiacos kit, which was his final wish. While, according to writer Thanasis Skroumpelos, this is a myth, Skroumpelos' stance has been disputed.

== Legacy ==
Godas has become a symbol of those fans of Olympiacos that are anti-fascist. In an Olympiacos Euroleague match against Real Madrid held on 20 November 2026, even the official Gate 7 group, who are the official organized ultras of Olympiacos and are widely known for their no politica policy, put up a banner commemorating Nikos Godas.
