= Ermis Kiveri F.C. =

Greek football club

Ermis Kiveri
- Full name: Athlitikos Omilos Ermis Kiveri
- Founded: 15 April 1968; 58 years ago
- Ground: Kiveri Ground
- Capacity: 500
- Chairman: Athanasios Davelos
- Manager: Nikolaos Mitrosylis
- League: Gamma Ethniki
- 2025–26: Argolis FCA First Division, 1st (promoted)
- Website: Official website

Ermis Kiveri F.C. (Greek: Ερμής Κιβερίου) is a Greek football club, based in Kiveri, Argolis.

== History ==
According to its founding charter, Ermis Kiveri was established on 15 April 1968, adopting the ancient Greek deity Hermes as its emblem and namesake.

In 2014, Ermis reached the Greek Football Amateur Cup final, where they faced Panerythraikos at the Corinth Municipal Stadium and were defeated 2–1.

The club's highest achievement is its participation in the national third-tier Gamma Ethniki, competing in Group 3 during the 2014–15 season and in Group 7 during the 2017–18 season. During the 2025–26 season, the club won its third Argolida FCA championship title and earned promotion back to Gamma Ethniki.

== Stadium ==
The club plays its home matches at Kiveri Stadium, which has a capacity of approximately 500 spectators.

== Honours ==
=== Domestic Titles and honours ===
  - Argolis FCA Championship: 3
    - 2013–14, 2016–17, 2025–26
  - Argolis FCA Cup: 1
    - 2013–14
