= Ionikos Nikaias =

- Full name: A.O. Ionikos Nikaias; Α.Ο. Ιωνικός Νικαίας
- Founded: 1965
- Colours: Blue, White
- Chairman: Anastasios Aristeidopoulos
- Website: Club website

Ionikos Nikaias (full name Athlitikos Omilos Ionikos Nikaias, A.O. Ionikos Nikaias / Greek: Α.Ο. Ιωνικός Νικαίας) is a Greek multi-sports club that is based in the suburban town of Nikaia within the Piraeus agglomeration. It was founded in 1965, and it has teams in football, basketball, and water polo. The club's name derives from Ionia, the birthplace of many residents of Nikaia, which came to Nikaia as refugees after the Asia Minor Disaster. The club's colours are blue and white.

== Departments ==
- Ionikos Nikaias F.C., football team
- Ionikos Nikaias B.C., basketball team
- Ionikos Nikaias Water Polo, Water Polo team
- Ionikos Nikaias V.C.
- Ionikos Nikaias Tennis Club
- Ionikos Nikaias Boxing Club
- Ionikos eSports
- Ionikos Nikaias Weightlifting club
- Ionikos Nikaias Softball club

== History ==
Ionikos Nikaias was founded in 1965, after the merger of the two former clubs of Nikaia (in those years called Kokkinia), Aris Piraeus and A.E. Nikaia. The first departments of the club were the football and the basketball teams. These are the most successful departments of the club so far. The football team has played in the Super League (1st-tier) many times, and it has reached a final of the Greek Cup. It has also played in the UEFA Cup one time.

The basketball team of Ionikos, was also founded in 1965. The most important period of the club was the late 1970s and early 1980s, when the club played in the top-tier level Greek Basket League. Ionikos had notable players, such as Panagiotis Giannakis, and it played two times in the FIBA Korać Cup.

Ionikos also had a notable volleyball team, that had a presence in A1 Ethniki Volleyball. This team was merged with Aris Nikaias in 2001, and formed the team of A.E. Nikaia. The successor of Ionikos achieved a win of the Greek Volleyball Cup in 2003.

The water polo team of Ionikos plays in A2 Ethniki Water Polo.

== Honours ==
=== Football ===
==== League titles ====
- Super League 2 (tier-II)
  - Winners (2): 1993–94, 2020–21
- Gamma Ethniki (tier-III)
  - Winners (2): 1977–78 (Group 8), 1981–82 (Group 1)
- Delta Ethniki (tier-IV)
  - Winners (1): 2012–13 (Group 9)
- Piraeus FCA Championship
  - Winners (2): 1976–77 (Group 2), 2024-25 (Group 1)

==== Cups ====
- Greek Cup
  - Runners-up (1): 1999–00
- Piraeus FCA Cup (Local Cup)
  - Winners (1): 1981–82

==== International ====
- Participant in the first round of the UEFA Europa League: 1999-2000

=== Basketball ===
==== League titles ====
- Greek 2nd Division (B) / Greek 2nd Division (A2) Champion: (2) (1974–75 B), 2018–19 A2)
- Greek 3rd Division Champion: (1) (2017–18)
- Greek C Basket League Group 3 Champion: (1) (2024-25)

==== European competitions ====
- Participant in FIBA Korać Cup (3rd-tier): (2) (1979–80, 1984–85)

=== Esports ===
==== League of Legends ====
- GL2D Spring Winner: (1) (2023)
- GL2D Summer Winner: (1) (2023)
