= 1985–86 Beta Ethniki =

Beta Ethniki
- Season: 1985–86
- Dates: 15 September 1985 – 15 June 1986
- Champions: Diagoras
- Promoted: Diagoras; Veria
- Relegated: Edessaikos; Naoussa; Aiolikos; Agrotikos Asteras

Beta Ethniki 1985–86 complete season.

== League table ==
Location of teams in 1985–86 Beta Ethniki

Pos	Team	Pld	W	D	L	GF	GA	GD	Pts	Promotion or relegation
1	Diagoras (C, P)	38	20	8	10	68	38	+30	48	Promotion to Alpha Ethniki
2	Veria (P)	38	18	11	9	55	35	+20	47	Promotion to Alpha Ethniki
3	Makedonikos	38	19	6	13	64	42	+22	44	
4	Levadiakos	38	13	15	10	45	38	+7	41	
5	Kavala	38	15	9	14	59	45	+14	39	
6	Athinaikos	38	13	13	12	51	51	0	39	
7	Trikala	38	15	8	15	40	35	+5	38	
8	Kastoria	38	12	14	12	41	42	−1	38	
9	Atromitos	38	16	6	16	45	50	−5	38	
10	Pierikos	38	16	5	17	43	49	−6	37	
11	Egaleo	38	14	9	15	47	43	+4	37	
12	Kilkisiakos	38	15	7	16	46	45	+1	37	
13	Panetolikos	38	14	9	15	49	53	−4	37	
14	Proodeftiki	38	14	9	15	45	53	−8	37	
15	Ionikos	38	14	9	15	41	49	−8	37	
16	Acharnaikos	38	13	10	15	51	58	−7	36	
17	Edessaikos (R)	38	14	8	16	41	55	−14	36	Relegation to Gamma Ethniki
18	Naoussa (R)	38	13	7	18	40	55	−15	33	Relegation to Gamma Ethniki
19	Aiolikos (R)	38	13	7	18	39	57	−18	33	Relegation to Gamma Ethniki
20	Agrotikos Asteras (R)	38	11	6	21	40	67	−27	28	Relegation to Gamma Ethniki

(C) Champions; (P) Promoted; (R) Relegated

== Results ==
Home \ Away	ACH	AGR	AIO	ATH	ATR	DIA	EDE	EGA	ION	KAS	KAV	KIL	LEV	MAK	NAO	PNT	PIE	PRO	TRI	VER
Acharnaikos		1–0	5–1	1–1	0–0	3–1	6–1	0–0	1–1	2–0	2–1	2–0	2–3	1–0	1–0	0–3	2–3	1–1	2–1	3–2
Agrotikos Asteras	2–0		3–0	2–2	6–2	0–3	1–1	1–2	1–0	0–0	2–1	2–1	3–1	1–1	0–0	1–2	2–1	1–0	4–0	0–2
Aiolikos	1–1	1–2		3–1	1–1	2–1	0–1	0–0	1–0	2–1	2–0	1–0	2–0	1–0	0–2	6–3	1–0	2–1	2–1	0–0
Athinaikos	0–1	1–1	2–0		7–1	0–2	2–0	3–2	1–0	2–0	1–0	3–0	1–1	0–3	2–1	3–1	1–0	1–1	1–1	4–2
Atromitos	2–0	1–0	2–0	0–1		3–0	3–1	1–0	0–1	1–1	2–1	2–1	2–0	2–0	1–0	2–2	1–1	4–1	1–0	1–0
Diagoras	4–2	2–0	2–1	5–1	2–0		3–1	1–1	2–0	3–0	3–1	2–0	1–1	6–0	3–1	4–0	2–1	3–1	1–0	3–1
Edessaikos	1–2	2–0	2–1	2–0	1–3	1–0		1–0	3–1	5–2	2–0	0–0	1–1	1–0	1–1	3–0	1–0	1–0	1–0	0–0
Egaleo	2–0	7–0	0–1	2–0	2–0	3–1	4–0		1–0	1–0	1–1	1–1	0–0	1–2	2–1	2–1	2–1	4–1	0–2	2–0
Ionikos	3–0	2–1	2–1	2–2	1–0	2–0	1–1	1–1		1–1	4–1	3–2	0–1	1–0	2–1	0–0	2–1	2–0	1–0	1–0
Kastoria	3–0	3–1	0–0	2–1	0–0	1–1	1–1	2–0	3–0		2–2	1–1	0–0	4–0	3–1	2–0	3–2	1–0	2–1	0–0
Kavala	1–0	6–1	0–0	2–0	3–2	4–1	3–0	5–0	1–1	0–0		2–1	1–0	1–1	6–1	2–0	4–0	2–0	2–0	1–1
Kilkisiakos	4–1	1–0	3–1	2–2	1–0	0–0	2–0	1–0	2–0	3–0	3–0		2–1	0–0	2–0	4–1	1–0	3–2	1–0	0–1
Levadiakos	1–1	2–0	4–0	1–1	1–0	1–0	3–1	1–1	2–0	0–0	1–1	1–0		1–1	0–0	0–0	3–1	3–0	4–0	0–0
Makedonikos	2–2	2–1	5–1	4–0	4–0	1–0	4–0	2–0	3–1	2–0	4–1	2–1	1–3		2–0	3–1	3–0	3–1	1–2	3–0
Naoussa	2–0	1–0	2–0	1–1	1–0	0–3	1–0	3–0	4–3	0–2	0–2	4–1	1–0	1–1		2–0	0–0	1–1	1–0	3–1
Panetolikos	2–2	1–0	1–0	0–0	0–1	1–1	3–1	1–0	2–1	0–0	3–0	4–2	3–0	3–2	4–0		1–0	2–0	0–1	1–1
Pierikos	2–0	4–1	3–2	0–0	3–2	1–1	2–1	4–2	2–0	3–0	2–0	1–0	3–1	0–2	3–0	3–2		2–0	1–1	1–1
Proodeftiki	1–0	2–0	3–1	2–2	3–2	3–2	2–0	2–0	1–1	2–1	1–0	1–0	2–2	1–0	4–1	1–1	1–0		1–0	1–1
Trikala	5–3	3–0	0–0	1–0	3–0	0–0	2–1	1–1	0–0	2–0	0–0	0–0	3–0	2–0	1–0	2–0	1–2	2–0		1–0
Veria	1–1	6–0	3–1	2–1	1–0	0–0	1–1	1–0	6–0	2–0	2–1	4–0	3–1	1–0	3–2	1–0	1–0	1–1	2–1	

Legend: Blue = home team win; Yellow = draw; Red = away team win.

== Play-offs ==
Relegation play-off
Team 1	Agg.	Team 2	1st leg	2nd leg
Acharnaikos	8–2	Edessaikos	6–1	2–1

== Top scorers ==
Rank	Player	Club	Goals
1	(Greece) Alekos Panagiotidis	Naoussa	21
2	(Greece) Kostas Vellios	Edessaikos	17
3	(Greece) Ilias Vakoufaris	Panachaiki	16
3	(Greece) Ioannis Gambetas	Trikala	16
5	(Greece) Kostas Kottakis	Ionikos	15
5	(Greece) Apostolos Mitrakos	Atromitos	15
5	(Greece) Nikolaos Moschos	Kavala	15
5	(Greece) Vasilis Tzalakostas	Athinaikos	15
