= Ampelakiakos F.C. =

Greek football club

Ampelakiakos
- Full name: Ampelakiakos Syndesmos Filathlon Salamina
- Founded: 1937; 89 years ago
- Ground: Ampelakia Municipal Stadium, Ampelakia, Greece
- Chairman: Aris Lorentzakis
- Manager: Nikos Manikiotis
- League: Piraeus FCA First Division
- 2025–26: Piraeus FCA First Division (Group 1), 5th
Home colours

Ampelakiakos Football Club (Greek: Αμπελακιακός Σύνδεσμος Φιλάθλων Αμπελακίων Σαλαμίνας) is a Greek football club, based in Ampelakia, Salamis Island, Attica.

== History ==
Since its founding, Ampelakiakos played numerous friendly matches as an independent football club. In 1946, it was officially recognized by the HFF with HFF Registration Number 174, joining the Piraeus Football Clubs Association. The club began its official competitive action in the 1946–47 season, competing uninterruptedly in the Piraeus championships ever since. After many years in the lower divisions of Piraeus FCA, it competed for the first time in the top local division during the 1972–73 season, having won the Second Division championship the previous year. In the following years, it continued competing across the Piraeus FCA divisions. In the 2008–09 season, the club won the Second Division title and has been competing uninterruptedly in the First Division since the 2009–10 season.

During the 2017–18 season, the club won the First Division championship for the first time in its history and earned a historic promotion to the Gamma Ethniki. The first match in Ampelakiakos's history in the Gamma Ethniki took place at home on 7 October 2018 against Atromitos Piraeus, securing a historic 2–1 victory. In its inaugural appearance in the Gamma Ethniki during the 2018–19 season, the team finished in 10th place out of 13 teams in Group 5 and was relegated to the Piraeus FCA First Division, where it has competed since the 2019–20 season. In 2020, Ampelakiakos qualified for the Piraeus FCA Cup final for the first time in its history after eliminating Ermis Korydallos, winning 4–1 away in the first leg and 2–1 at home in the second leg of the semi-finals.

== Rivalries ==
Ampelakiakos's local derby in Salamina is played against Aias Salamina.

== Honours ==
=== Domestic Titles and honours ===
  - Piraeus FCA champion: 1
    - 2017–18
