= Keratsini FC =

- Full name: A.P.O Keratsiniou
- Founded: 1926; 100 years ago
- Ground: Municipal Stadium of Keratsini Panagiotis Salpeas
- Capacity: 1,500
- Chairman: Michalis Araouzos
- Manager: Dimitrios Arnaoutis
- League: Piraeus FCA First Division
- 2025–26: Piraeus FCA First Division (Group 1), 5th
- Website: https://apokeratsini.wordpress.com/
Home colours	Away colours

Keratsini Football Club (Greek: Α.Π.Ο. Κερατσίνι) is a Greek football club based in Keratsini, Greece. It plays in Piraeus FCA First Division.

== History ==
Keratsini was founded in 1926 by Mpiskos and Diatsigkos with the name AO Neapoli, who later became ESKO IE, one of the Union Clubs Keratsini Orfeas. It was one of the four founding clubs of Piraeus FCA. In 1926, the team settled in Keratsini, renamed Athletic Football Club Keratsini. The Club took its final form in 1968 by merging with AO Amfiali.

In 1991, the Keratsini first reached the Fourth Division and in 1994 in Gamma Ethniki. In 1994, the team lost the Greek Amateur Cup final on penalties (5–4). From 1997–2000 and 2004–2006, it again reached Gamma Ethniki League.

For the 2006–2007 season, it competed in Regional League (Fourth Division) and it relegated to the local league. For the season 2007–2008, it won the local championship with a record of 25 wins in 26 games and reached the Fourth division. For the seasons 2008–2013, it was one of the best teams of fourth Division and played twice in Piraeus Cup Final(2010–2012). It won the Piraeus Cup 6 times, in 1990, 1995, 1996, 2010, 2016 and 2017.

== Presidents ==
- Keratsini
- Gkamilis
- Kalamitsis (also Presidents of EPSP)
- Miltiades Marinakis
- Kolokotronis
- Kidonakis
- Mposinakis
- Marathiwtis
- Kalafatis

== Honours ==
=== Domestic ===
League

- Fourth Division
  - Winners (2): 1992–93, 1996–97
- Piraeus FCA First Division
  - Winners (7): 1971–72, 1989–90, 2002–03, 2007–08, 2014–15, 2016–17, 2023–24
- Piraeus FCA Second Division
  - Winners (2): 1945–46, 1960–61

Cup

- Piraeus FCA Cup
  - Winners (7): 1989–90, 1994–95, 1995–96, 2009–10, 2015–16, 2016–17, 2019–20

== Notables ==
- Costas Choumis, transferred in Romania
- Bagiakakos
- Chamodrakos
- Politis
- Varnalis
- Aggelos Kremmydas
- Doulgeroglou
- Kleisaris
