= Argolida Football Clubs Association =

Association football governing body in Argolida Prefecture, Greece

- Full name: Argolida Football Clubs Association; Greek: Ένωση Ποδοσφαιρικών Σωματείων Αργολίδας
- Short name: Argolida F.C.A.; Greek: Ε.Π.Σ. Αργολίδας
- Founded: 1964; 62 years ago
- Headquarters: Nafplio, Greece
- FIFA affiliation: Hellenic Football Federation
- President: Vassilios Sideris
- Website: epsarg.gr

Argolida Football Clubs Association (Greek: Ένωση Ποδοσφαιρικών Σωματείων Αργολίδας) was founded on 12 August 1964. Its formation was agreed at a meeting held on 23 May 1963, during a Panargiakos F.C. council meeting. The chairman of the meeting, Nikos Zafeiris, asked for approval for the founding of a Football association in Argolida. The Argolida's football clubs used to play at Argolidokorinthias Football Association, which was based in Corinthos. The Argolida Football Clubs Association organizes many events that support the interests of its members. There are more than 60 football pitches which are used by football clubs that are members of this association. The association organises an annual international football tournament called "Atreus" which is under the auspices of the Hellenic Football Federation and with the cooperation of Arsenal Soccer Schools.

== Founder members ==
Football clubs that were founder members included Panargiakos F.C. and:

- Apollon Argous
- Argonatautis N. Kiou
- AEK Argous
- Proitos T.Tyrinthas
- A.E. Kranidi

== League ==
Argolida FCA League
- Founded: 1964
- First season: 1964–65
- Level on pyramid: 4–6
- Promotion to: Gamma Ethniki
- Current champions: Ermis Kiveri (2025–26)
- Most championships: Pannafpliakos (10 titles)
- Website: https://epsarg.gr

The league structure of EPS Argolida is as follows:

- A1 Division
- A2 Division
  - Group 1
  - Group 2
- B Division
  - Group 1
  - Group 2

=== Champions ===
Season	Champion
1964–65	Panargiakos
1965–66	Pannafpliakos
1966–67	Proitos Nea Tiryntha
1967–68	Pannafpliakos
1968–69	Pannafpliakos
1969–70	Panargiakos
1970–71	Dyovouniotis Aria
1971–72	Argonautis Nea Kios
1972–73	Ermis Ermioni
1973–74	Argonautis Nea Kios
1974–75	Pannafpliakos
1975–76	Panargiakos
1976–77	Pannafpliakos
1977–78	Asklipios Palaia Epidavros
1978–79	Panargiakos
1979–80	Pannafpliakos
1980–81	Palamidis Nafplio
1981–82	Argeas Lontos Argos
1982–83	Asklipios Palaia Epidavros
1983–84	Argeas Lontos Argos
1984–85	Poseidon Didyma
1985–86	Argonautis Nea Kios
1986–87	Ermis Ermioni
1987–88	Argonautis Nea Kios
1988–89	Argeas Lontos Argos
1989–90	Argonautis Nea Kios
1990–91	Asklipios Palaia Epidavros
1991–92	Ermis Ermioni
1992–93	Argonautis Nea Kios
1993–94	Dyovouniotis Aria
1994–95	Poseidon Didyma
1995–96	Dyovouniotis Aria
1996–97	Atromitos Panariti
1997–98	Pannafpliakos
1998–99	Asteras Drepaniakos
1999–00	Asteras Drepaniakos
2000–01	Atromitos Panariti
2001–02	Pannafpliakos
2002–03	AE Kranidi
2003–04	Troiziniakos Galatas
2004–05	Panargiakos
2005–06	AE Kranidi
2006–07	Enosi Midea
2007–08	Pannafpliakos
2008–09	AO Poros
2009–10	Asteras Drepaniakos
2010–11	Ermis Ermioni
2011–12	Portoheliakos
2012–13	Troiziniakos Galatas
2013–14	Ermis Kiveri
2014–15	PAO Koutsopodi
2015–16	AE Lerna
2016–17	Ermis Kiveri
2017–18	AE Lerna
2018–19	Nafplio 2017
2019–20	Koronis Koilada
2020–21	Cancelled
2021–22	Panargiakos
2022–23	Koronis Koilada
2023–24	Pannafpliakos
2024–25	AE Ermionida
2025–26	Ermis Kiveri

=== Performance by club ===
Club	Titles	Winning seasons
Pannafpliakos	10	1966, 1968, 1969, 1975, 1977, 1980, 1998, 2002, 2008, 2024
Panargiakos	6	1965, 1970, 1976, 1979, 2005, 2022
Argonautis Nea Kios	6	1972, 1974, 1986, 1988, 1990, 1993
Ermis Ermioni	4	1973, 1987, 1992, 2011
Dyovouniotis Aria	3	1971, 1994, 1996
Asklipios Palaia Epidavros	3	1978, 1983, 1991
Argeas Lontos Argos	3	1982, 1984, 1989
Ermis Kiveri	3	2014, 2017, 2026
Asteras Drepaniakos	3	1999, 2000, 2010
AE Lerna	2	2016, 2018
Atromitos Panariti	2	1997, 2001
Koronis Koilada	2	2020, 2023
AE Kranidi	2	2003, 2006
Troiziniakos Galatas	2	2004, 2013
Poseidon Didyma	2	1985, 1995
PAO Koutsopodi	1	2015
Enosi Midea	1	2007
Palamidis Nafplio	1	1981
AO Poros	1	2009
Portoheliakos	1	2012
Proitos Nea Tiryntha	1	1967
Nafplio 2017	1	2019
AE Ermionida	1	2025

== Cup ==
=== Finals ===
Season	Winner	Score	Runner-up
1971–72	Lontos Koutsopodi		
1972–73	Ermis Ermioni	3–1	Dyovouniotis Aria
1973–74	Argonautis Nea Kios	2–0	Ermis Ermioni
1974–75	Pannafpliakos	4–1	Elpida Kiveri
1975–76	Panargiakos	w/o	Pannafpliakos
1976–77	Pannafpliakos	1–0	Olympiakos Argos
1977–78	Asklipios Palaia Epidavros	1–0	Pannafpliakos
1978–79	Pannafpliakos	3–2	Panargiakos
1979–80	Bouboulina Spetses		Asklipios Palaia Epidavros
1980–81	Bouboulina Spetses	2–1	Pannafpliakos
1981–82	Pannafpliakos	3–1	Argeas Lontos Argos
1982–83	Ethnikos Tolo	1–0 (a.e.t.)	Asklipios Palaia Epidavros
1983–84	Panargiakos	3–0	Bouboulina Spetses
1984–85	Argeas Lontos Argos	1–0	Poseidon Didyma
1985–86	Panargiakos	7–2	Troiziniakos Galatas
1986–87	Ethnikos Tolo	4–1 (a.e.t.)	Ermis Ermioni
1987–88	Argonautis Nea Kios		
1988–89	Pannafpliakos	3–1	Panargiakos
1989–90	Pannafpliakos		
1990–91	Pannafpliakos	2–1	Dyovouniotis Aria
1991–92	Argonautis Nea Kios	2–1	Troiziniakos Galatas
1992–93	Ermis Ermioni		
1993–94	Ermis Ermioni		
1994–95	Poseidon Didyma	2–1	Asklipios Palaia Epidavros
1995–96	Dyovouniotis Aria		
1996–97	Poseidon Didyma	2–0	Troiziniakos Galatas
1997–98	Pannafpliakos		
1998–99	Asteras Drepaniakos		
1999–00	Anagennisi Lygourio		
2000–01	Pannafpliakos	6–1	Ermis Ermioni
2001–02	Panargiakos	4–2	Pannafpliakos
2002–03	Pannafpliakos	1–0	Panargiakos
2003–04	Troiziniakos Galatas		
2004–05	Keravnos Iria	3–2	Enosi Midea
2005–06	AE Kranidi		
2006–07	Enosi Poros Galatas	1–0	Ermis Ermioni
2007–08	Panargiakos	2–1	AO Poros
2008–09	Pannafpliakos	2–0	AO Poros
2009–10	Enosi Midea	1–0	AO Poros
2010–11	Enosi Midea	1–0	AO Poros
2011–12	Pannafpliakos 2011	1–0	Troiziniakos Galatas
2012–13	Panargiakos	4–0	Troiziniakos Galatas
2013–14	Ermis Kiveri	1–1, 3–1 (pen.)	Koronis Koilada
2014–15	Koronis Koilada	1–0	Argonautis Nea Kios
2015–16	Panargiakos	2–0	AE Ermionida
2016–17	Argonautis Nea Kios	2–0	AE Lerna
2017–18	AE Ermionida	1–0	Argonautis Nea Kios
2018–19	Panargiakos	2–1	AE Ermionida
2019–20	Koronis Koilada	by draw	Panargiakos
2020–21	Not held		
2021–22	Foinikas Nea Epidavros	2–1	Panargiakos
2022–23	Panargiakos	1–0	Foinikas Nea Epidavros
2023–24	Panargiakos	2–0	AE Ermionida
2024–25	Bouboulina Spetses	1–1, 4–1 (pen.)	Ethnikos Tolo
2025–26	Asteras Drepaniakos	1–0	Troiziniakos Galatas

=== Performance by club ===
Club	Titles	Winning seasons
Pannafpliakos	12	1975, 1977, 1979, 1982, 1989, 1990, 1991, 1998, 2001, 2003, 2009, 2012
Panargiakos	10	1976, 1984, 1986, 2002, 2008, 2013, 2016, 2019, 2023, 2024
Argonautis Nea Kios	4	1974, 1988, 1992, 2017
Ermis Ermioni	3	1973, 1993, 1994
Bouboulina Spetses	3	1980, 1981, 2025
Koronis Koilada	2	2015, 2020
Enosi Midea	2	2010, 2011
Poseidon Didyma	2	1995, 1997
Ethnikos Tolo	2	1983, 1987
Asteras Drepaniakos	1	2026
Foinikas Nea Epidavros	1	2022
AE Ermionida	1	2018
Ermis Kiveri	1	2014
Enosi Poros Galatas	1	2007
AE Kranidi	1	2006
Keravnos Iria	1	2005
Troiziniakos Galatas	1	2004
Anagennisi Lygourio	1	2000
Asteras Drepaniakos	1	1999
Dyovouniotis Aria	1	1996
Argeas Lontos Argos	1	1985
Asklipios Palaia Epidavros	1	1978
Lontos Koutsopodi	1	1972

== Super Cup ==
=== Finals ===
Season	Winner	Runner-up	Score
2010	Enosi Midea	Asteras Drepaniakos	4–1
2011	Pannafpliakos 2011	Ermis Ermionidas	3–0
2014	Panargiakos	Troiziniakos Galatas	3–0
2017	Ermis Kiveri	Argonautis Nea Kios	2–0
2022	Foinikas Nea Epidavros	Panargiakos	2–1

== Clubs ==
There are 100 football teams that are members of Argolida Football Clubs Association which includes:

- Sport's Club
- A.E. Kranidi
- AEK Argos
- A.O. Amygdalitsas
- A.O. Dalamandaras
- A.O. Mideas
- A.O. N. Kiou
- A.O. Schinohoriou
- Aias Traheias
- Academy 98
- Akratitos
- Anagennisi Lygourio
- Apollon
- Argeias
- Argeiakos
- Argolida 2000
- Argonautis
- Aris Roinou
- Arizona
- Aristeas
- Aristeionas
- Arkadios
- Asklipios
- Asteras Drepaniakos
- Atromitos
- Achladokabos
- Diovouniotis
- Danaoi
- Dimaina
- Diomidis
- Doxa
- Doxa Adamiou
- Doxa Poul
- Dryopi
- Enosi Mideas
- Erasinos
- Ermionida
- Ermis Kiveri
- Iraklis Karyas
- Thermissia
- Thiseas
- Thyella
- Thyella limnon
- Thyella Mal.
- Thyella Skaf.
- Inachos
- Karantzas
- Keraunos Irion
- Kechries
- Koronis Koiladas
- Kreon
- Leukakia
- Lygeus
- Midas
- Methana
- Metohi
- Mikti Argolidas Juniors
- Mikti Argolidas Youngsters
- Borsia
- Mikinaikos
- Myloi
- Achilleas
- Niki
- Olympiakos Argous
- Olympiakos Koutsopodiou
- Orneatis Gymnou
- Pammideatikos
- Pananyfiakos
- Panargiakos F.C.
- Panasinaikos
- Panionios Dalamanaras
- Pannafpliakos F.C.
- PAOK Koutsopodi
- Plataniti
- Plataniti Evolution
- Poros F.C.
- Portoheliakos
- Poseidon Dydimon
- Poseidon Porou
- Proitos
- Prosymni
- Pyrgiotika
- Saronas
- Spetses
- Tolo
- Toxotis
- Troiziniakos
- Chelo
- Ydra
- Feidon
- Foinikas
- Honikas
