= 1982–83 Gamma Ethniki =

Gamma Ethniki
- Season: 1982–83
- Champions: Edessaikos
- Promoted: Edessaikos
- Relegated: Panarkadikos; Preveza; Olympiakos Loutraki; Panargiakos

The 1982–83 Gamma Ethniki was the first unofficial season since the league replaced the C National Amateur Division. Edessaikos was crowned champion, thus winning promotion to Beta Ethniki.

Panarkadikos, Preveza, Olympiakos Loutraki and Panargiakos were relegated to Delta Ethniki.

== League table ==
Pos	Team	Pld	W	D	L	GF	GA	GD	Pts	Promotion or relegation
1	Edessaikos (C, P)	30	18	8	4	52	20	+32	44	Promotion to Beta Ethniki
2	Kallithea	30	17	5	8	37	27	+10	39	
3	Athinaikos	30	15	8	7	49	26	+23	38	
4	Anagennisi Epanomi	31	15	6	10	41	35	+6	36	
5	Nikaia	30	15	5	10	51	44	+7	35	
6	Lamia	30	13	8	9	30	30	0	34	
7	Almopos Aridea	30	13	7	10	30	30	0	33	
8	Toxotis Volos	30	11	10	9	43	30	+13	32	
9	Odysseas Kordelio	30	12	8	10	44	33	+11	32	
10	Ilisiakos	30	11	10	9	40	32	+8	32	
11	Anagennisi Karditsa	30	10	12	8	25	20	+5	32	
12	Ethnikos Alexandroupoli (Note: ?1 point deducted?)	30	12	8	10	30	23	+7	31	
13	Panarkadikos (R)	30	10	6	14	32	40	−8	26	Relegation to Delta Ethniki
14	Preveza (R)	30	4	6	20	21	48	−27	14	Relegation to Delta Ethniki
15	Olympiakos Loutraki (R)	30	2	9	19	16	52	−36	13	Relegation to Delta Ethniki
16	Panargiakos (Note: ?10 points deducted?) (R)	30	6	9	15	7	49	−42	11	Relegation to Delta Ethniki

(C) Champions; (P) Promoted; (R) Relegated
