= Gerasimos Koutsopodiotis =

Greek footballer

Personal information
- Date of birth: 10 April 1999 (age 27)
- Place of birth: Athens, Greece
- Height: 1.87 m (6 ft 1 1/2 in)
- Position: Centre-back

Youth career
- Panionios

Senior career*
Years	Team	Apps	(Gls)
2018–2019	Proodeftiki	20	(2)
2019–2020	Lamia	1	(0)
2020–2021	Charavgiakos F.C.	22	(2)
2021–2022	Aias Salaminas F.C.	15	(3)
2022-2024.	Ao Karavas	48	(10)

International career^{‡}
2014–2015	Greece U15	1	(0)
2015-2016	Greece U16	5	(0)
2016-2017	Greece U17	1	(0)
- * Club domestic league appearances and goals as of 22:08, 9 March 2020 (UTC) ‡ National team caps and goals as of 12:01, 12 January 2018

Gerasimos Koutsopodiotis (Greek: Γεράσιμος Κουτσοποδιώτης, born 10 April 1999) is a Greek professional footballer who plays as a centre-back and defensive midfielder.

== Early life ==
Koutsopodiotis was born and raised in Vouliagmeni (Greek: Βουλιαγμένη), Athens. He attended Gimnasio, Lower Secondary Education School and graduated from Psychico College in 2017.

== Club career ==
=== Proodeftiki ===
Koutsopodiotis joined Proodeftiki in 2018 on a free transfer.

=== Lamia ===
On 20 August 2019, Koutsopodiotis joined Lamia on a three-year deal.

=== Charavgiakos F.C. ===
Koutsopodiotis joined Charavgiakos F.C. on 4 August 2020.
