= Dimitrios Arnaoutis =

Greek footballer

Personal information
- Full name: Dimitrios Arnaoutis
- Date of birth: 28 November 1963 (age 62)
- Place of birth: Piraeus, Greece

Team information
- Current team: Keratsini (manager)

Managerial career
- Years: Team
- 2004–2005: Keratsini
- 2005: Aetos Korydallou
- 2006: AMES Nireas
- 2006–2007: Asteras Magoula
- 2009–2010: Rouf
- 2010: Vyzas
- 2011–2012: Rouf
- 2012: Ethnikos Piraeus
- 2015–2016: Acharnaikos (assistant)
- 2016: Acharnaikos
- 2018: Keratsini
- 2018–2020: Ionikos
- 2021–2022: Proodeftiki
- 2023: Fostiras
- 2023: Proodeftiki
- 2024–2025: Keratsini
- 2025: Ionikos
- 2025: Fostiras
- 2026–: Keratsini

Dimitrios Arnaoutis (Greek: Δημήτριος Αρναούτης; born 28 November 1963) is a Greek professional football manager. One of the most well known managers in Greek football, he has coached teams at every level and earned several promotions. In the 2019–2020 season, he helped Ionikos F.C. achieve promotion from the Third Division. The following year, he led them to another promotion to Super League 2. In 2025, he returned for a brief stint with Ionikos F.C. in the Third National League.
