= Stratos Voutsakelis =

Greek footballer

Personal information
- Full name: Efstratios Voutsakelis
- Date of birth: 28 April 1953 (age 73)
- Place of birth: Kalamaria, Greece

Managerial career
- Years: Team
- 1990: Apollon Kalamarias
- 1999–2000: ILTEX Lykoi
- 2001–2002: Kassandra
- 2002–2003: Agrotikos Asteras
- 2003–2004: Kassandra
- 2004–2005: Olympiacos Volos
- 2005–2006: Kalamata
- 2007–2008: Kavala
- 2008: Kalamata
- 2008–2009: Apollon Kalamarias
- 2009–2010: Ionikos
- 2010: Doxa Drama

Stratos Voutsakelis (Greek: Στράτος Βουτσακέλης; born 28 April 1953) is a Greek football manager.
