= Ionikos F.C. =

Greek football club in Nikaia

Ionikos
- Full name: F.C. Ionikos Nikaia 1965 A.C.
- Nicknames: Κοκκινιώτες (The ones from Kokkinia); Κυανόλευκοι (Cyan-Whites)
- Founded: 29 June 1965; 61 years ago
- Stadium: Neapoli Stadium, Nikaia, Attica, Greece
- Capacity: 5,500
- Chairman: Anastasios Sounglakos
- Manager: Giorgos Kavasis
- League: Gamma Ethniki
- 2025–26: Gamma Ethniki (Group 6), 2nd
- Website: ionikosfc.com
Home colours	Away colours	Third colours

Ionikos Football Club (Greek: Α.Ο. Ιωνικός Νικαίας) is a Greek football club based in Nikaia, Greece, competing in the Gamma Ethniki. It is part of the multi-sport club Ionikos Nikaias.

From 1989 to 2007 Ionikos spent 16 out of 18 seasons in the Alpha Ethniki/Super League. During that span Ionikos finished as high as 5th-place in the league (on two occasions), was a finalist in the 1999-2000 Greek Cup, and participated in the 1999-2000 UEFA cup.

The club's colours are blue and white.

Every Orthodox Easter Monday the retired football players of Ionikos and AEK organize a match in memory of the 1922 Asia Minor catastrophe. Ionikos holds a long-standing rivalry with the other major club within the wider Nikaia-Korydallos area, Proodeftiki.

== History ==
=== Foundation and early years (1965–1989) ===
Ionikos was established in 1965, from a merger of local clubs Nikaia Sports Union and Aris Piraeus, with Alex Meraklidis as new club's first president. The club's early years were indifferent in progress but Ionikos became a mainstay of the Greek Second Division through the 1970s before being relegated in 1976 to the local Piraeus FCA Championship. After playing in the FCA Winners' Championship and gaining an immediate promotion, another relegation followed in 1979, with fans funding the club for the new Gamma Ethniki (Third Division). After two failed promotion attempts in the following seasons, Ionikos won the Gamma Ethniki title in 1982. The 1982–83 season saw another relegation before Ionikos were promoted again in 1985, following their 3rd place in 1984. The next 4 years saw Ionikos complete three consecutive mid table finishes, avoiding relegation in 1986 and 1988 on the last matchday, before the club secured promotion in 1989 with a third–place finish.

=== Ownership change and top flight years (1989–2007) ===
The club's first promotion to the top flight was accompanied by unexpected problems— Dimitris Melissanidis withdrew as chairman, and the club needed 50 million drachmas to participate in the championship. Businessman Nikolaos Kanellakis stepped forward to provide the needed sum and become the club's new chairman. He would appoint Janusz Kowalik as manager in November 1989 soon after.

Kanellakis' arrival coincided with a successful era for the club. From the 1989 promotion, Ionikos would spend 16 of the next 18 seasons in the Greek top flight, up until 2007, and during that time, the team would finish as high as 5th-place in the league (on two occasions), reach a Greek Cup Final, and compete in the UEFA cup.

Ionikos' UEFA Cup appearance came in the 1999–00 season—the opposition was French side Nantes, and Ionikos lost both home and away matches, 1–3 and 0–1, respectively. Ionikos reached the Greek Cup Final later that same season under the management of Oleg Blokhin, where they came up against traditional power AEK Athens, losing 3–0.

On 21 April 2004, Nikolaos Kanellakis, the club's chairman for 14 years, died. Hundreds of Ionikos supporters —as well as other sports fans—attended Kanellakis' funeral, where the flag of Ionikos covered the coffin of the late chairman. Nikolaos' son Christos took his father's place as chairman.

=== Relegation to Second League, lower league football, return to the top flight (2007–2021) ===
Ionikos' long run in the top flight ended in the 2006–07 season, when the team finished in 16th-place in the Super League and was relegated back to the Football League. Ionikos spent the following two seasons in the Football League, finishing 5th and 4th place, respectively, as the club failed to get promoted to the top flight. At one point, due to financial issues, they would be relegated to Delta Ethniki. The PAE (Football Anonymous Company) would be dissolved and the team's ownership would be taken over by the Association of Fans of Ionikos "Rangers Club," turning the team into the only Greek team to follow a model where the supporters own and operate the team, a model like the one FC Barcelona uses. After achieving promotion to the Super League Greece at the conclusion of the 2020–21 season, they returned to the top flight after a 14–year absence, after successfully getting licensed to compete in the top league's new season.

=== Return to the Top League and relegation to amateur leagues ===
After a first season back at the top flight, in which the club finished 7th, Ionikos finished in the regular season 12th with 18 points the following year, one point above the relegation zone. The club were relegated in the Play-out round after an encounter with fellow relegation contenders Lamia, in which Ionikos led 2–0 at half time before Lamia equalised to remain in the top flight, while Ionikos returned to the Super League Greece 2 following the result.

In the 2023–24 season, it finished in third place in the Southern Group of Super League 2. However, it was unable to participate in the next season's championship due to financial issues. Thus, after fifty years of continuous presence in the national categories, Ionikos was administratively relegated to the Piraeus Football Clubs Association First Division in the fourth tier of the Greek football pyramid. The club also did not field a team for its Greek Football Cup tie against Ermionida that month; the resulting sanctions of two five-point deductions and a €100,000 fine were overturned on appeal in October 2024.

=== Return to national divisions ===
Ionikos finished first in the first group of the Piraeus FCA first division championship and, after finishing second in the 6th group of the FCA Winner's Championship, it was promoted to Gamma Ethniki, thus returning to the national divisions.

=== New Leadership ===
Ionikos FC entered the 2026–27 season under new football leadership. On 16 June 2026 the board of the parent amateur club announced that it was in contact with prospective investors for the football department, which it stated carried no tax debt, and that members would be called to decide the department's future. On 1 July 2026 the members voted in favour of the proposal of businessman Marios Zanos, and on 3 August 2026 the board announced a two-year private agreement under which Zanos assumed the management of the football department and the club's academies, with the amateur club retaining ownership of Ionikos. The board's statement committed the new management to transparency, the development of the academy and the club's financial health, describing the supporters as the club's "only strength".

Ahead of the season the new leadership launched a new official website and a supporter membership programme, and Ionikos opened its 2026–27 Gamma Ethniki campaign in Group 6 away to AER Afantou on 27 September 2026.

On 13 October 2026, after a 2-0 loss to Proodeftiki in the Gamma Ethniki, the club announced that it had submitted a proposal to Marios Zanos to end his ownership of the football department.

On 15 October 2026, after the end of Ionikos' partnership with Marcello Troisi, Giorgos Kavasis, who had been previously sacked after two match days, returned as head coach.

== Stadium ==
Ionikos plays its home matches at Neapolis Public Stadium (Greek: Γήπεδο Νεάπολης), located in Nikaia, a suburb of Piraeus. The stadium was completed in 1965, and had its latest redevelopment in 2000. It currently has a seating capacity of 5,500, but record attendance is 6,565 for a match against Olympiacos in 1990.

Ionikos' organized supporters gather in Gate 3 at Neapoli Stadium.

== Supporters and rivals ==
While Ionikos was competing in the lower divisions there were two main supporters' groups—the Association of Ionikos Supporters and the Fan Club of Agios Georgios.

On Ionikos's promotion to the top division the Association of Ionikos Supporters Rangers Club was formed—or Rangers Club, for short—with headquarters in Elefterias Square in Korydallos. Before Ionikos's first match in the top flight the Rangers Club organised a parade of 2,000 supporters from outside Rangers' headquarters to Stavros Mavrothalassitis Stadium, where Ionikos played its first three home matches of the 1989–90 season. Two years later the supporters' club offices moved to Neapolis, and then in 1996 to Nikaia, before returning to Neapolis in 1999. A second branch was established in Nikaia in 2004.

Ionikos fans have a rivalry with the fans of the other topic club of Nikaia, Proodeftiki.

Ionikos fans have rivalries too with other nearby clubs, Egaleo, and Atromitos.

=== The Derby of Kokkinia ===
The football matches between Ionikos and Proodeftiki are called "The Derby of Kokkinia".

== Former players ==
- (Ukraine) Dmytro Chigrinskiy
- (Ukraine) Eduard Stoyanov
- (Andorra) Ildefons Lima
- (Andorra) Toni Lima
- (Scotland) Craig Brewster
- (India) Gurjinder Singh
- (Spain) José Cañas

== List of managers ==
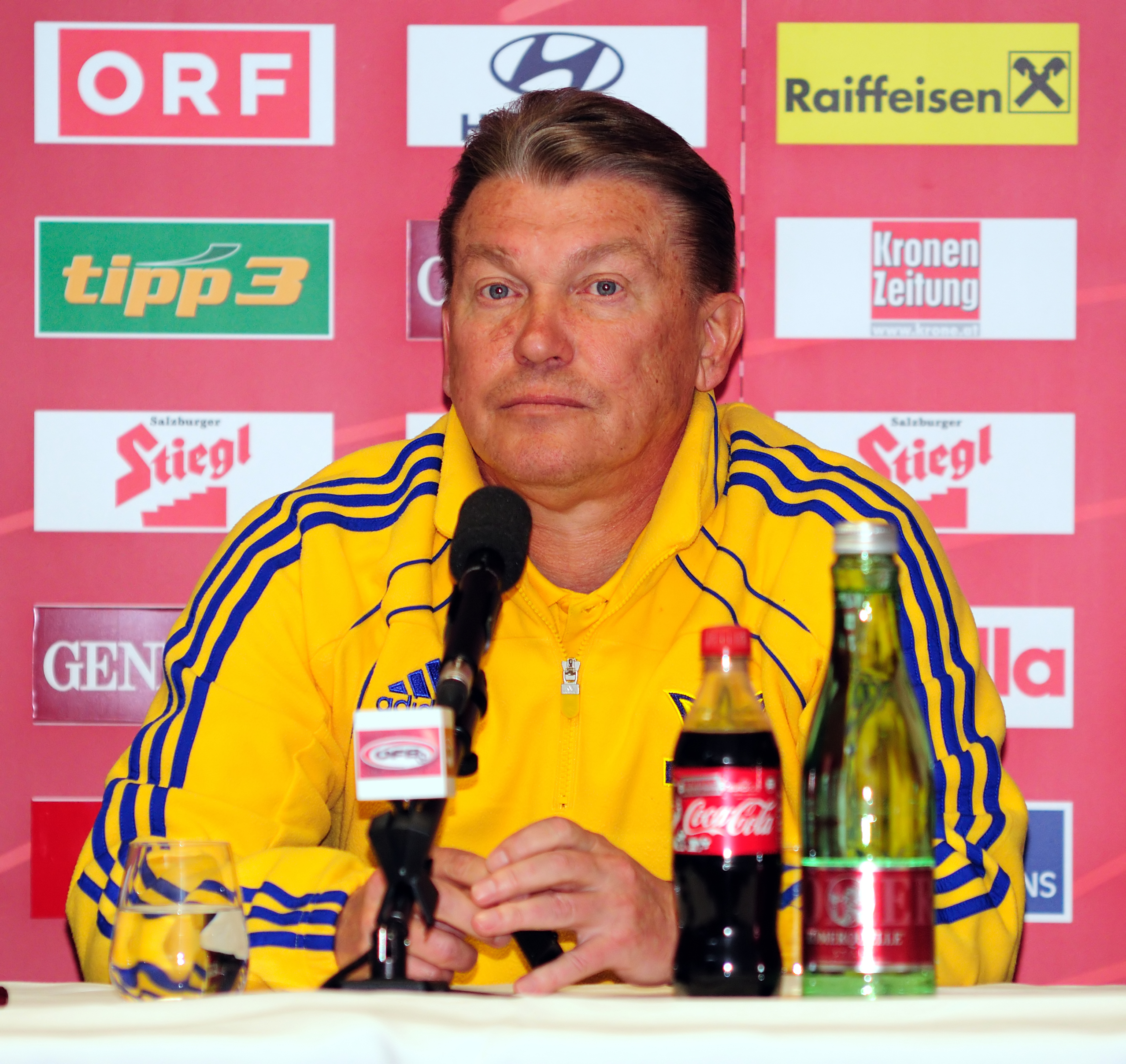
Oleg Blokhin, who managed the club from 1994 to 1997 and 2000 to 2002

Ionikos managers from 1992 and henceforth.

1992–93	(Greece) Nikos Alefantos (Germany) Gerhard Prokop (Greece) Sokratis Gemelos
1993–94	(Greece) Sokratis Gemelos
1994–95	(Bulgaria) Hristo Bonev (Ukraine) Oleg Blokhin
1995–96	(Ukraine) Oleg Blokhin
1996–97	(Ukraine) Oleg Blokhin (Greece) Sokratis Gemelos (Poland) Jacek Gmoch
1997–98	(Poland) Jacek Gmoch
1998–99	(Uruguay) Sergio Markarián
1999–00	(Greece) Kostas Polychroniou (Greece) Sokratis Gemelos (Ukraine) Oleg Blokhin

2000–01	(Ukraine) Oleg Blokhin
2001–02	(Ukraine) Oleg Blokhin (Greece) Sokratis Gemelos
2002–03	(France) Jean-Michel Cavalli (Poland) Jacek Gmoch
2003–04	(Montenegro) Miloje Kljajević (Greece) Vangelis Vlachos
2004–05	(Greece) Vangelis Vlachos (Uruguay) Alejandro Cáceres
2005–06	(Greece) Sakis Tsiolis
2006–07	(Greece) Sakis Tsiolis (Portugal) Augusto Inácio (Greece) Giannis Chatzinikolaou
2007–08	(Uruguay) Jorge Barrios (Greece) Georgios Vazakas (Greece) Nikos Anastopoulos

2008–09	(Greece) Nikos Goulis
2009–10	(Greece) Giannis Ioannou (Greece) Stratos Voutsakelis (Greece) Vasilis Vouzas
2010–11	(Greece) Giannis Petrakis (Greece) Leonidas Tsigaridas (Serbia) Miodrag Ćirković (Greece) Nikos Maronitis
2011–12	(Greece) Nikos Maronitis
2012–13	(Greece) Nikos Frousos
2013–14	(Greece) Markos Dimos (Greece) Konstantinos Partheniou
2014–15	(Greece) Ilias Kalopitas (Greece) Stavros Iliopoulos (Greece) Lefteris Vasiliadis
2015–16	(Greece) Lefteris Vasiliadis (Greece) Margaritis Chatzialexis

2016–17	(Greece) Ilias Kalopitas (Greece) Loukas Karadimos
2017–18	(Greece) Loukas Karadimos (Greece) Margaritis Chatzialexis (Greece) Vangelis Laiveras (Greece) Margaritis Chatzialexis (Greece) Nikos Maronitis
2018–19	(Greece) Konstantinos Anyfantakis (Greece) Dimitrios Arnaoutis
2019–20	(Greece) Dimitrios Arnaoutis (Greece) Apostolos Charalampidis
2020–21	(Greece) Dimitrios Spanos
2021–22	(Greece) Dimitrios Spanos
2022–23	(Greece) Dimitrios Spanos (Greece) Michalis Grigoriou
2023–24	(Greece) Georgios Simos

== Honours ==
=== Domestic ===
==== League titles ====
- Super League 2 (tier-II)
  - Winners (2): 1993–94, 2020–21
- Gamma Ethniki (tier-III)
  - Winners (2): 1977–78 (Group 8), 1981–82 (Group 1)
- Delta Ethniki (tier-IV)
  - Winners (1): 2012–13 (Group 9)
- Piraeus FCA Championship
  - Winners (2): 1976–77 (Group 2), 2024–25 (Group 1)

==== Cups ====
- Greek Cup
  - Runners-up (1): 1999–00
- Piraeus FCA Cup (Local Cup)
  - Winners (1): 1981–82

=== International ===
- Participant in the first round of the UEFA cup: 1999-2000

== Season-by-season ==
- 1965–66: Beta Ethniki 5th (1)
- 1966–67: Beta Ethniki 5th (2)
- 1967–68: Beta Ethniki 11th (3)
- 1968–69: Beta Ethniki 17th (4)
- 1969–70: Beta Ethniki 14th (5)
- 1970–71: Beta Ethniki 5th (6)
- 1971–72: Beta Ethniki 16th (7)
- 1972–73: Beta Ethniki 9th (8)
- 1973–74: Beta Ethniki 8th (9)
- 1974–75: Beta Ethniki 9th (10)
- 1975–76: Beta Ethniki 18th (11)
- 1976–77: Piraeus FCA (1)
- 1977–78: Beta Ethniki 9th (12)
- 1978–79: Beta Ethniki 18th (13)
- 1979–80: Gamma Ethniki 11th (1)
- 1980–81: Gamma Ethniki 5th (2)
- 1981–82: Gamma Ethniki 1st (3)
- 1982–83: Beta Ethniki 15th (14)
- 1983–84: Gamma Ethniki 3rd (4)
- 1984–85: Gamma Ethniki 2nd (5)
- 1985–86: Beta Ethniki 15th (15)
- 1986–87: Beta Ethniki 7th (16)
- 1987–88: Beta Ethniki 13th (17)
- 1988–89: Beta Ethniki 3rd (18)
- 1989–90: Alpha Ethniki - 14th (1)
- 1990–91: Alpha Ethniki - 16th (2)
- 1991–92: Beta Ethniki 2nd (19)
- 1992–93: Alpha Ethniki 17th (3)
- 1993–94: Beta Ethniki 1st (20)
- 1994–95: Alpha Ethniki 15th (4)
- 1995–96: Alpha Ethniki 8th (5)
- 1996–97: Alpha Ethniki 8th (6)
- 1997–98: Alpha Ethniki 5th (7)
- 1998–99: Alpha Ethniki 5th (8)
- 1999–2000: Alpha Ethniki 10th (9)
- 2000–01: Alpha Ethniki 6th (10)
- 2001–02: Alpha Ethniki 12th (11)
- 2002–03: Alpha Ethniki 14th (12)
- 2003–04: Alpha Ethniki 9th (13)
- 2004–05: Alpha Ethniki 10th (14)
- 2005–06: Alpha Ethniki 12th (15)
- 2006–07: Super League Greece 16th (16)
- 2007–08: Beta Ethniki 5th (21)
- 2008–09: Beta Ethniki 4th (22)
- 2009–10: Beta Ethniki 15th (23)
- 2010–11: Football League 16th (24)
- 2011–12 : Delta Ethniki 4th (1)
- 2012–13 : Delta Ethniki 1st (2)
- 2013–14: Gamma Ethniki 3rd (6)
- 2014–15: Gamma Ethniki 3rd (7)
- 2015–16: Gamma Ethniki 7th (8)
- 2016–17: Gamma Ethniki 2nd (9)
- 2017–18: Gamma Ethniki 7th (10)
- 2018–19: Gamma Ethniki 2nd (11)
- 2019–20: Football League 2nd (12)
- 2020–21: Super League Greece 2 1st (25)
- 2021–22: Super League Greece 1 7th (17) (1st in play-outs)
- 2022–23: Super League Greece 1 13th (18)
- 2023–24: Super League Greece 2 3rd (26)
- 2024–25 Piraeus FCA First Division 1st (3)
- 2025–26: Gamma Ethniki 2nd (13)

Since 1965–66:

- 18 seasons in First Division
- 26 season in Second Division
- 13 seasons in Third Division
- 2 seasons in Fourth Division
- 3 seasons in Piraeus Football Clubs Association

== Club records ==
=== Alpha Ethniki / Super League 1 ===
Last Update 19 May 2023

- First participation: 1989–90
- Total participations: 18
- Wins: 169
- Draws: 157
- Losses: 242
- Goals scored: 620
- Goals conceded: 821
- Record win: Ionikos 5–0 OFI in 1997–98
- Record loss: AEK Athens 6–0 Ionikos in 1995–96, Olympiacos 6–0 Ionikos in 2002–03, PAOK 6–0 Ionikos in 2022–23

=== Beta Ethniki / Super League 2 ===
- First participation: 1965–66
- Total participations: 26
- Wins: 299
- Draws: 224
- Losses: 259
- Goals scored: 925
- Goals conceded: 849
- Record win: Ionikos 8–0 Bizani in 1966–67, Ionikos 8–0 Anagennisi Artas in 1974–75
- Record loss: Vyzas 7–0 Ionikos in 1971–72

== Individual records ==
=== Appearances ===
Player	Matches
(Greece) Giannis Xanthopoulos	318
(Greece) Georgios Daraklitsas	290
(Greece) Nikolaos Frousos	217
(Syria) Mohammad Afash	196
(Liberia) Oliver Makor	164

=== Goals ===
Player	Goals
(Greece) Kostas Kottakis	top scorer
(Greece) Nikolaos Frousos	64
(Scotland) Craig Brewster	45
(Liberia) Oliver Makor	43
(Greece) Giannis Xanthopoulos	24

== Crest and colors ==
=== Crest evolution ===
1965–1995

1995–2019

2019–today

=== Original kit ===
Ionikos's first home colours 1965	Ionikos's first away colours 1965	Ionikos's first goalkeeper kit 1965

=== Kit evolution ===
1965–66	1978–79	1980–81	1989–90	1991–92	1999–00

1993–94	1997–98	2001–02 2002–03	2005–06	2007–08 2008–09

== European record ==
Season	Competition	Round	Club	Home	Away
1999–00	UEFA Cup	1st Round	(France) Nantes	1–3	0–1

== In video games ==
Ionikos Nikaias was featured in FIFA 2000, as well as several Football Manager games. It was also featured in Championship Manager: Season 01/02.
