= Peramaikos F.C. =

Peramaikos
- Full name: Athlitikos Podosfairikos Omilos Peramaikos
- Founded: 1953; 73 years ago
- Ground: Municipal Stadium of Perama
- Capacity: 350
- League: Piraeus FCA
- Website: https://peramaikos.gr/
Home colours	Away colours

Peramaikos Football Club (Greek: Α.Π.Ο. Περαμαϊκός) is a Greek football club founded in 1953.

== History ==
The club has spent one season (1986–1987) in the Gamma Ethniki. Nikolaos Petrakis, a businessman from Perama, became club chairman and led the club to promotion with talented players like Vallidis. After achieving promotion, Nikolaos Petrakis had health problems and left. Peramaikos were relegated to the regionalized Delta Ethniki. In Greek Cup played with Panetolikos F.C. and in this game Peramaikos lost 1–0. The last 20 years plays in Delta Ethniki. The club was nearly involved in a merger with Aias Salamina F.C. in 2009. In the 2013–14 season Peramaikos will play again in Gamma Ethniki. In the 2014–15 season, Peramaikos will play in the local Piraeus categories as the Delta Ethniki was removed.
