= Piraeus Football Clubs Association =

Association football governing body in Piraeus Prefecture, Greece

- Full name: Piraeus Football Clubs Association; Greek: Ένωση Ποδοσφαιρικών Σωματείων Πειραιά
- Short name: Piraeus F.C.A.; Greek: Ε.Π.Σ. Πειραιά
- Founded: 1925; 101 years ago
- Headquarters: Piraeus, Greece
- FIFA affiliation: Hellenic Football Federation
- President: Ioannis Spathas
- Website: epspeir.gr

Piraeus Football Clubs Association (Greek: Ένωση Ποδοσφαιρικών Σωματείων Πειραιά) was founded in 1925 after the termination of Greece Football Clubs Association. It was the second largest football association in Greece and was officially recognized by FIFA alongside Athens FCA, as the Hellenic Football Federation had not been established at the time. After the establishment of Alpha Ethniki it became the Piraeus Football Clubs Association for amateurs.

== History ==
Olympiacos participated in Piraeus Championship from the first time in 1925, immediately after its inception. They were invincible and won the final defeating Piraikos with 4–2. In the early years they were a great opponent of Ethnikos Piraeus, who won the championship of 1928, while the two clubs tied in 1930 and were declared both champions. Ethnikos Piraeus also won the Championship in 1939, the only time Olympiacos participated and lost from another team. Since the 1930-1931 championship and up to 1959 Olympiacos played without serious opponents and won all the championships. They didn't participate in the championships of 1932, 1933 and 1936 because of the formation of the division while they were eliminated in 1928 after just one game and were excluded from the Hellenic Football Federation with AEK Athens and Panathinaikos because they refused to participate in the national championship.

== Competitions ==
=== Championship ===
Piraeus Football Clubs Association
- Organising body: EPS Piraeus
- Province: Piraeus
- Divisions: 3
- Promotion to: Gamma Ethniki
- League cup: Piraeus Cup
- Current champions: Proodeftiki FC (Group 1); Amfiali FC (Group 2)
- Most championships: Olympiacos (25 titles)
- Current: 2026–27

=== Cup ===
Piraeus Football Clubs Association
- Current champions: Ethnikos Piraeus FC (6th title)
- Most championships: APO Keratsini (7 Titles)
- Current: 2026–27

== League ==
Season	Champion	Season	Champion	Season	Champion
1924–25	Olympiacos	1935–36	Ethnikos Piraeus	1950–51	Olympiacos F.C.
1925–26	Olympiacos	1936–37	Olympiacos	1951–52	Olympiacos
1926–27	Olympiacos	1937–38	Olympiacos	1952–53	Olympiacos
1927–28	Ethnikos Piraeus	1938–39	Ethnikos Piraeus	1953–54	Olympiacos
1928–29	Olympiacos	1939–40	Olympiacos	1954–55	Olympiacos
1929–30	Olympiacos	1940–1945	Cancelled	1955–56	Olympiacos
1930–31	Olympiacos	1945–46	Olympiacos	1956–57	Olympiacos
1931–32	A.C. Nikaia	1946–47	Olympiacos	1957–58	Olympiacos
1932–33	Ethnikos Piraeus	1947–48	Olympiacos	1958–59	Olympiacos
1933–34	Olympiacos	1948–49	Olympiacos		
1934–35	Olympiacos	1949–50	Olympiacos		

=== List of champions 1959–present ===
- 1959–60 : Atromitos Piraeus
- 1960–61 : Panelefsiniakos
- 1961–62 : Vyzas Megara
- 1962–63 : A.E. Nikaia
- 1963–64 : Doxa Piraeus
- 1964–65 : Aias Salamina
- 1965–66 : A.O.K. Faliro
- 1966–67 : Moschato
- 1967–68 : D.A.O. Argonautis
- 1968–69 : Saronikos Aegina
- 1969–70 : Enosis Aspropyrgos
- 1970–71 : Saronikos Aegina
- 1971–72 : A.P.O. Keratsini
- 1972–73 : A.O. Syros
- 1973–74 : Amfiali
- 1974–75 : Amfiali
- 1975–76 : Enosis Aspropyrgos
- 1976–77 : Ionikos
- 1977–78 : Vyzas Megara
- 1978–79 : A.O. Neapoli
- 1979–80 : Iraklis Elefsina
- 1980–81 : A.O. Nikaia
- 1981–82 : D.A.O. Argonautis
- 1982–83 : Peramaikos
- 1983–84 : A.S. Pontioi Drapetsona
- 1984–85 : Doxa Piraeus
- 1985–86 : Amfiali
- 1986–87 : A.S. Drapetsona
- 1987–88 : Mandraikos
- 1988–89 : Amfiali
- 1989–90 : A.P.O. Keratsini
- 1990–91 : Iraklis Elefsina
- 1991–92 : Enosis Aspropyrgos
- 1992–93 : A.O. Peiraiki
- 1993–94 : D.A.O. Argonautis
- 1994–95 : Mauros Aetos
- 1995–96 : Atromitos Piraeus, Mandraikos
- 1996–97 : Moschato, Chalkidona
- 1997–98 : Vyzas Megara, A.S. Pontioi Drapetsona
- 1998–99 : Atromitos Piraeus
- 1999–2000 : Atromitos Piraeus, Aias Salamina
- 2000–01 : Ermis Korydallos, A.O. Manis
- 2001–02 : Enosis Aspropyrgos, Aias Salamina
- 2002–03 : A.P.O. Keratsini, A.S. Pontioi
- 2003–04 : Moschato, Saronikos Aegina
- 2004–05 : Atromitos Piraeus, A.E. Nikaia
- 2005–06 : A.E. Peramatos, Iraklis Nikaia
- 2006–07 : Chalkidona, Peramaikos
- 2007–08 : Amfiali, A.P.O. Keratsini
- 2008–09 : Ellas Pontion, Aris Amfialis
- 2009–10 : Atromitos Piraeus, Moschato
- 2010–11 : Ellas Pontion, Olympiada Keratsiniou
- 2011–12 : Peramaikos, Aris Amfialis
- 2012–13 : Ethnikos Piraeus, Moschato
- 2013–14 : Ethnikos Piraeus, Odigitria
- 2014–15 : A.P.O. Keratsini, Ikaros Kallitheas
- 2015–16 : A.P.O. Aetos Korydallou, Proodeftiki
- 2016–17 : A.P.O. Keratsini, Odigitria
- 2017–18 : Atromitos Piraeus, Ampelakiakos
- 2018–19 : Ermis Korydallos, Moschato
- 2019–20 : Proodeftiki, Aias Salamina
- 2020–21 : Cancelled
- 2021–22 : Amfiali, Ellas Pontion, Charavgi-Asteras Evgenia
- 2022–23 : Atromitos Piraeus, Peramaikos
- 2023–24 : A.P.O. Keratsini, A.O. Karava
- 2024–25 : Ionikos FC, Aias Salaminas
- 2025–26 : Proodeftiki, APS Amfiali

=== Performance by club ===
Club	Titles	Season
Olympiacos	25	1925, 1926, 1927, 1929, 1930, 1931, 1934, 1935, 1937, 1938, 1940, 1946, 1947, 1948, 1949, 1950, 1951, 1952, 1953, 1954, 1955, 1956, 1957, 1958, 1959
Atromitos Piraeus	8	1960, 1996, 1999, 2000, 2005, 2010, 2018, 2023
Keratsini	7	1972, 1990, 2003, 2008, 2015, 2017, 2024
Amfiali	6	1974, 1975, 1986, 1989, 2008, 2022
Ethnikos Piraeus	5	1928, 1936, 1939, 2013, 2014
Moschato	5	1967, 1997, 2004, 2010, 2013, 2019
Aias Salamina	5	1965, 2000, 2002, 2020, 2025
Enosis Aspropyrgos	4	1970, 1976, 1992, 2002
Peramaikos	4	1983, 2007, 2012, 2023
Vyzas Megara	3	1962, 1978, 1998
D.A.O. Argonautis	3	1968, 1982, 1994
Saronikos Aegina	3	1969, 1971, 2004
A.S. Pontioi Drapetsona	3	1984, 1998, 2003
Proodeftiki	3	2016, 2020, 2026
Doxa Piraeus	2	1964, 1985
Iraklis Elefsina	2	1980, 1991
Mandraikos	2	1988, 1996
Chalkidona	2	1997, 2007
Ermis Korydallos	2	2001, 2019
A.E. Nikaia	2	1963, 2005
Ellas Pontion	2	2009, 2011
Aris Amfialis	2	2009, 2012
Odigitria	2	2014, 2017
Ionikos	2	1977, 2025
A.C. Nikaia	1	1932
Panelefsiniakos	1	1961
A.O.K. Faliro	1	1966
A.O. Syros	1	1973
A.O. Neapoli	1	1979
A.O. Nikaia	1	1981
A.S. Drapetsona	1	1987
A.O. Peiraiki	1	1993
Mauros Aetos	1	1995
A.O. Manis	1	2001
A.E. Perama	1	2006
Iraklis Nikaia	1	2006
Olympiada Keratsiniou	1	2011
Ikaros Kallitheas	1	2015
A.P.O. Aetos Korydallos	1	2016
Ampelakiakos	1	2018
Charavgi-Asteras Evgenia	1	2022
A.O. Karava	1	2024
APS Amfiali	1	2026

== Cup ==
=== Winners ===
Season	Winner
1971–72	A.S. Pontioi Drapetsona
1972–73	A.P.S. Amfiali
1973–74	Olympiacos (Amateurs)
1974–75	Niki Renti
1975–76	Spitha Nikaia
1976–77	Odigitria Piraeus
1977–78	Panaspropyrgiakos
1978–79	Doxa Piraeus
1979–80	A.O. Neapoli Nikaia
1980–81	A.O. Nikaia
1981–82	Ionikos
1982–83	Niki Renti
1983–84	Aris Nikaia
1984–85	Aris Nikaia
1985–86	Mandraikos
1986–87	Aris Nikaia
1987–88	Atromitos Piraeus
1988–89	A.S. Pontioi Drapetsona
1989–90	A.P.O. Keratsini
1990–91	Aias Salamina
1991–92	Peramaikos
1992–93	A.O. Moschato
1993–94	A.O. Peiraiki
1994–95	A.P.O. Keratsini
1995–96	A.P.O. Keratsini
1996–97	Enosi Aspropyrgos
1997–98	Chalkidona
1998–99	Chalkidona
1999–00	Atromitos Piraeus
2000–01	Vyzas Megara
2001–02	Olympiacos (Amateurs)
2002–03	A.O. Moschato
2003–04	Atromitos Piraeus
2004–05	Peramaikos
2005–06	Peramaikos
2006–07	Aias Salamina
2007–08	Saronikos Aegina
2008–09	A.E. Perama
2009–10	A.P.O. Keratsini
2010–11	Proodeftiki
2011–12	Atromitos Piraeus
2012–13	A.E. Moschato
2013–14	Ethnikos Piraeus
2014–15	Proodeftiki
2015–16	A.P.O. Keratsini
2016–17	A.P.O. Keratsini
2017–18	A.O. Karavas
2018–19	Ethnikos Piraeus
2019–20	A.P.O. Keratsini
2020–21	Cancelled
2021–22	Ellas Pontion
2022–23	Ethnikos Piraeus
2023–24	Ethnikos Piraeus
2024–25	Ethnikos Piraeus
2025–26	Ethnikos Piraeus

=== Performance by club ===
Club	Titles	Season
A.P.O. Keratsini	7	1990, 1995, 1996, 2010, 2016, 2017, 2020
Ethnikos Piraeus	6	2014, 2019, 2023, 2024, 2025, 2026
Atromitos Piraeus	4	1988, 2000, 2004, 2012
Aris Nikaia	3	1984, 1985, 1987
A.O. Moschato / A.E. Moschato	3	1993, 2003, 2013
Peramaikos	3	1992, 2005, 2006
A.S. Pontioi Drapetsona	2	1972, 1989
Olympiacos (Amateurs)	2	1974, 2002
Niki Renti	2	1975, 1983
Panaspropyrgiakos / Enosi Aspropyrgos	2	1978, 1997
Chalkidona	2	1998, 1999
Aias Salamina	2	1991, 2007
Proodeftiki	2	2011, 2015
A.P.S. Amfiali	1	1973
Spitha Nikaia	1	1976
Odigitria Piraeus	1	1977
Doxa Piraeus	1	1979
A.O. Neapoli Nikaia	1	1980
A.O. Nikaia	1	1981
Ionikos	1	1982
Mandraikos	1	1986
A.O. Peiraiki	1	1994
Vyzas Megara	1	2001
Saronikos Aegina	1	2008
A.E. Perama	1	2009
A.O. Karavas	1	2018
Ellas Pontion	1	2022

== Structure ==
The championship of Piraeus FCA consists of three categories. The champions of the category A get promoted in the Gamma Ethniki. The structure of the 2025–26 season championship of the amateur association is as follows:

- Category A: 26 teams (two groups of 13 teams)
- Category B: 26 teams (two groups of 13 teams)
- Category C: 23 teams (one group of 12 teams and one group of 11 teams)

== Teams in national divisions ==
Six teams participate in national divisions in the 2026–27 season :

- Super League Greece
  - Olympiacos
- Super League Greece 2
  - Olympiacos B
- Gamma Ethniki:
  - Amfiali
  - Ethnikos Piraeus
  - Ionikos
  - Proodeftiki
