= Aris Piraeus =

- Founded: 1915; 1924 (refounded)
- Dissolved: 1920 (Merged into Peiraikos Syndesmos); 1965 (Merged with A.E. Nikaias to create Ionikos Nikaias)

Aris Piraeus was a Greek football club and one of the first based in Piraeus. It was one of the predecessor teams of Ionikos, along with A.E. Nikaias.

== History ==
It was initially founded in 1915 in Kastella by brothers Limberaki, Ilias Nikolakopoulos, Notis Komninos, Theodoros Orlof, and Othonas Kokkinos (the latter two were also amongst the founding members of Olympiacos Piraeus). In 1920 it merged into Peiraikos Syndesmos.

However, it was refounded in 1924 in Kokkinia by refugees from Minor Asia.

In 1926 it won a tournament of independent Piraeus football clubs. In that same year, it was recognized officially. It later entered into Piraeus' Football Clubs Association and the second tier of its championship.

In the next ten years it won the third tier and second tier of the FCA championship and was thus promoted into the first tier. In its matches against Olympiacos, it lost 27 of 28 matches.

In the Piraeus FCA 1961-62 championship, it got promoted to Beta Ethniki and it remained there until 1965, when it merged with A.E. Nikaias (which was known as Amina Piraeus during the Inter-war period) to create Ionikos Nikaias.

== Honours ==
- 1 Piraeus FCA second-tier championship: 1936
- 2 Piraeus FCA third-tier championships: 1932, 1933
