= Edessaikos F.C. =

Greek football club

Edessaikos
- Full name: Athlitikos Syllogos Edessaikos (Greek: Αθλητικός Σύλλογος Εδεσσαϊκός)
- Nickname: Τριαινοφόροι (Tridents)
- Founded: 1960; 66 years ago
- Ground: Municipal Stadium of Edessa
- Capacity: 4,000
- Chairman: Nikolaos Kiourtzidis
- Manager: Petros Pechlivanis
- League: Pella FCA First Division
- 2025–26: Pella FCA Second Division, 3rd (promoted)
- Website: Official website
Home colours	Away colours

Edessaikos Football Club (Greek: Εδεσσαϊκός) is a Greek football club based in Edessa, Greece currently playing in the Pella FCA First Division. Edessaikos was founded in 1960 and has won the Gamma Ethniki a record 4 times (1977, 1983, 1987, 1989). Edessaikos also won the Balkans Cup in 1993.

== History ==
Edessaikos is a football club based in Edessa Greece. It was founded in 1960 when three local clubs – Aris, Iraklis, Ethnikos – merged. Edessaikos was a founding member of the Pella Football Clubs Association in 1971.

=== Lower divisions ===
The team quickly moved beyond local competitions, earning promotion to Beta Ethniki for the 1961–62 season. It won its group title twice, in 1963 and 1965, but failed to secure promotion to Alpha Ethniki on both occasions following the play-off matches. The club continued to compete in the second tier until 1975. Furthermore, during the 1969–70 season, it actively contended for the group title once again, ultimately finishing in third place.

In 1975, it was relegated back to the local championship. In 1976, it won the local title but failed to gain promotion through the special play-off tournament, an achievement it ultimately accomplished the following year to return to the Beta Ethniki. Until 1989, it alternated between the Beta and Gamma Ethniki divisions.

In the single-group 1988–89 Gamma Ethniki (comprising 18 teams), the club won the championship with 44 points, recording 16 wins, 12 draws, and 6 losses. The Foris Gentzis Stadium, which had been sorely missed the previous season, became a true fortress for the team, as Edessaikos achieved 12 wins and 5 draws at home, with a goal difference of 29–5.

However, over the following five years, supported by a generation of talented footballers, Edessaikos experienced an impressive rise, which led them to the Alpha Ethniki in 1992. Under head coach Makis Katsavakis and featuring a blend of experienced and young players, the club managed to become one of the few Alpha Ethniki teams originating from a small Greek town.

=== Alpha Ethniki ===
The club spent five seasons in the Alpha Ethniki, from 1992–93 through 1996–97. Following a successful debut season that secured their spot in the top flight, Telis Batakis succeeded Katsavakis as head coach in the summer of 1993. During the initial period, the team fought to avoid relegation, finishing 14th led by Bulgarian player Hristo Kolev. Subsequent seasons proved more successful, with Edessaikos securing a tenth-place finish in 1994–95 and a ninth-place finish in 1995–96.

In 1994–95, the team reached the semi-finals of the Greek Football Cup, marking the club's greatest achievement in the competition. A mediocre season plagued by financial difficulties followed, and at the end of the 1996–97 season, Edessaikos parted ways with the Alpha Ethniki, having been unable to return to the top flight since.

=== Return to lower divisions ===
The successful decade was followed by mediocre years marked by consecutive relegations. From competing in the Alpha Ethniki during the 1996–97 season, the club found itself playing in the local championship of the Pella FCA by 2002–03.

In the 2007–08 season, the club competed in the Delta Ethniki under the guidance of former player Antonis Sapountzis. Until 2016–17, it competed in the local regional leagues. In 2010, the club celebrated the 50th anniversary of its foundation. On 21 May 2017, Edessaikos was crowned champion of the Pella FCA First Division after winning the promotion final 1–0. Starting from the 2017–18 season, Edessaikos competed in the Gamma Ethniki, embarking on a journey to return to the top tier and revive the glory days of the late 1990s. In the 2022–23 season, Edessaikos was relegated back to the Pella FCA First Division, from which it ultimately withdrew and never competed. For the 2024–25 season, Edessaikos restarted in the Pella FCA First Division following a merger with Elpida Edessa; it finished in 8th place and failed to achieve promotion.

=== Balkan Cup ===
The crowning achievement for the club during its successful decade in the 1990s was winning the Balkan Cup in the 1992–93 season. It stands as the most significant trophy in Edessaikos' history, even though the tournament had lost much of its former prestige.

The team participated in the 1992–93 edition and advanced to the final, where it faced the Bulgarian side Etar Veliko Tarnovo. Despite losing the first leg 0–1, Edessaikos triumphed 3–1 in the return leg to capture the trophy (Stafylidis 18′, Theodoros Tsoleridis 65′ pen., Saša Škara 87′ – Stoyanov 17′). The team's captain was Dimitris Stafylidis.

== Honours ==
Edessaikos F.C. honours
Type	Competition	Titles	Winners
International	Balkans Cup	1	1992–93
Domestic	Beta Ethniki (Second-tier)	2	1962–63 (Group 4), 1964–65 (Group 4)
Domestic	Gamma Ethniki (Third-tier)	4	1976–77, 1982–83, 1986–87, 1988–89
Regional	Greek FCA Winners' Championship	1	1977
Regional	Pella FCA First Division	6	1975–76, 1976–77, 2002–03, 2005–06, 2008–09, 2016–17
Regional	Pella FCA Cup	8	1981–82, 2000–01, 2003–04, 2007–08, 2008–09, 2010–11, 2016–17, 2018–19

- record
- ^{S} Shared record

=== Notable wins ===
Season	Match	Score
1994–93	Edessaikos – Panathinaikos	2–0
1994–95	Edessaikos – AEK Athens	2–1
1992–93	Edessaikos – PAOK	3–1
1993–94	Edessaikos – PAOK	2–0
1994–95	Edessaikos – PAOK	1–0
1995–96	PAOK – Edessaikos	0–1
1992–93	Edessaikos – Aris	2–1
1993–94	Edessaikos – Aris (for Greek Cup)	1–0
1994–95	Edessaikos – Aris (for Greek Cup)	1–0
1994–95	Aris – Edessaikos (for Greek Cup)	0–1
1996–97	Edessaikos – Aris	1–0

== Colours and badge ==
Traditionally the club's colours are green and white. Edessaikos' badge consists of a trident, together with the name of the club placed above the trident.

== Supporters ==
Edessaikos fans are not many, but they are passionate. Their nickname is "WaterBoys".
