= Nikaia, Attica =

Nikaia Νίκαια
- Municipal unit
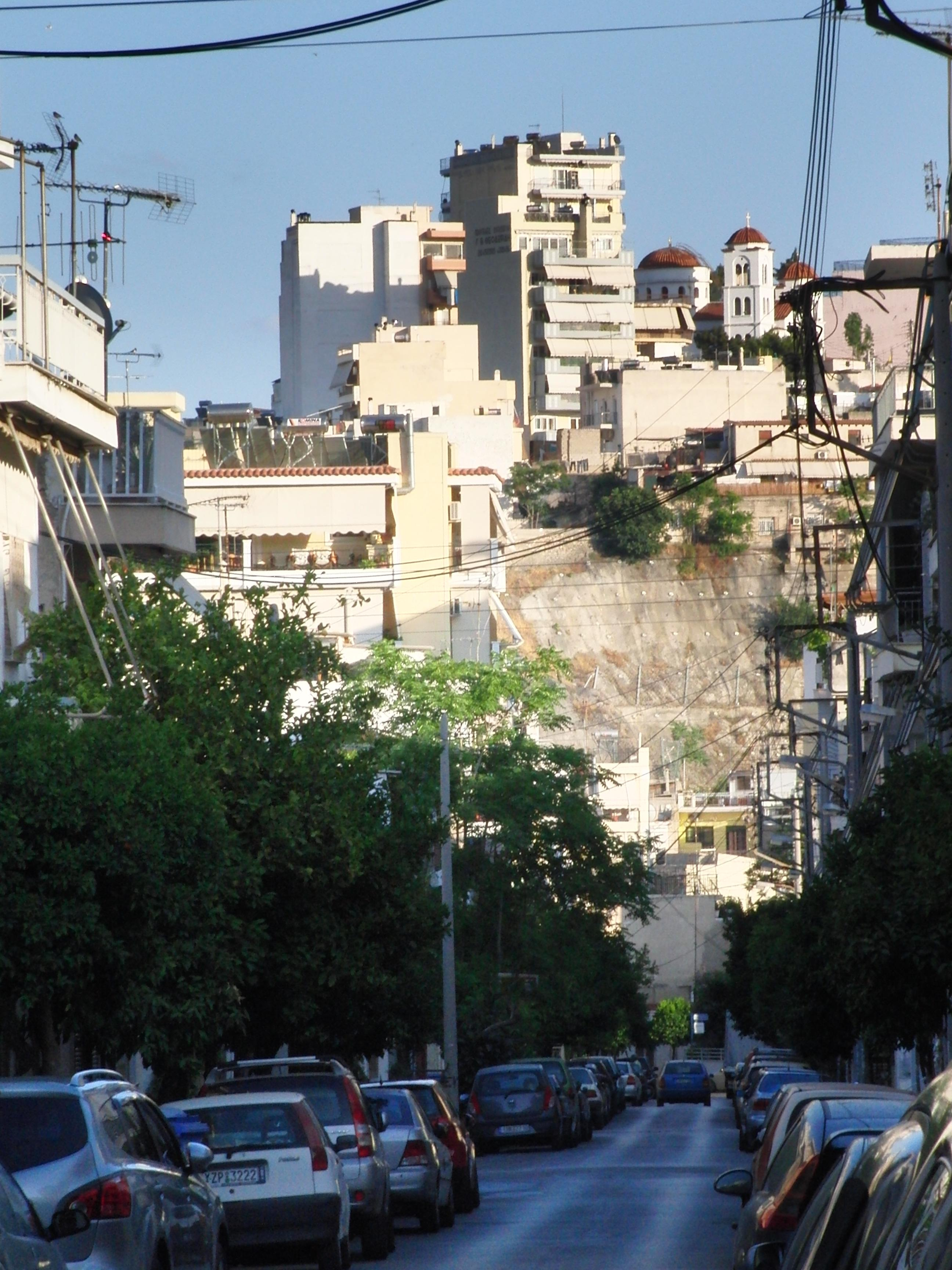

- Location within the regional unit

- Location within Greece
- Coordinates: 37°58′N 23°38′E
- Country: Greece
- Administrative region: Attica
- Regional unit: Piraeus
- Municipality: Nikaia-Agios Ioannis Rentis

Area
  - Municipal unit: 6.649 km^{2} (2.567 sq mi)
- Elevation: 40 m (130 ft)

Population (2021)
  - Municipal unit: 88,077
  - Municipal unit density: 13,250/km^{2} (34,310/sq mi)
- Time zone: UTC+2 (EET)
  - Summer (DST): UTC+3 (EEST)
- Postal code: 184 xx
- Area code: 210
- Vehicle registration: Z
- Website: www.polisnikaia.gr

Nikaia (Greek: Νίκαια, Níkaia), known before 1940 as Kokkinia (Κοκκινιά, Kokkiniá), is a town and a suburb of the Piraeus agglomeration, in the southwestern part of the Athens urban area, Greece. Since the 2011 local government reform it is part of the municipality Nikaia-Agios Ioannis Rentis in the regional unit of Piraeus, and it is the seat and a municipal unit of the municipality.

== Geography ==
Nikaia is located 2.5 km (1.6 mi) north of Piraeus, and 7 km (4 mi) west of central Athens. The municipal unit has an area of 6.649 km^{2}. The main streets are Gregori Lambraki Street and Petrou Ralli Street.

== Climate ==
According to the station of the National Observatory of Athens Nikaia has a hot semi-arid climate (Köppen climate classification: BSh) with mild winters and hot summers.

Climate data for Nikaia 23 m a.s.l.
Month	Jan	Feb	Mar	Apr	May	Jun	Jul	Aug	Sep	Oct	Nov	Dec	Year
Record high °C (°F)	21.9 (71.4)	21.2 (70.2)	26.7 (80.1)	30.0 (86.0)	36.5 (97.7)	41.1 (106.0)	42.6 (108.7)	42.3 (108.1)	35.9 (96.6)	31.2 (88.2)	27.4 (81.3)	22.1 (71.8)	42.6 (108.7)
Mean daily maximum °C (°F)	13.7 (56.7)	15.2 (59.4)	17.5 (63.5)	20.8 (69.4)	25.6 (78.1)	30.6 (87.1)	34.0 (93.2)	33.6 (92.5)	29.2 (84.6)	24.2 (75.6)	19.8 (67.6)	15.6 (60.1)	23.3 (74.0)
Daily mean °C (°F)	10.9 (51.6)	12.3 (54.1)	14.3 (57.7)	17.4 (63.3)	22.1 (71.8)	26.9 (80.4)	30.3 (86.5)	30.3 (86.5)	25.8 (78.4)	21.1 (70.0)	17.0 (62.6)	13.0 (55.4)	20.1 (68.2)
Mean daily minimum °C (°F)	8.1 (46.6)	9.3 (48.7)	11.0 (51.8)	13.9 (57.0)	18.5 (65.3)	23.1 (73.6)	26.5 (79.7)	26.5 (79.7)	22.4 (72.3)	17.9 (64.2)	14.1 (57.4)	10.4 (50.7)	16.8 (62.3)
Record low °C (°F)	−1.1 (30.0)	−0.7 (30.7)	1.7 (35.1)	7.3 (45.1)	13.7 (56.7)	15.8 (60.4)	20.1 (68.2)	20.6 (69.1)	15.4 (59.7)	11.3 (52.3)	7.2 (45.0)	0.8 (33.4)	−1.1 (30.0)
Average rainfall mm (inches)	50.3 (1.98)	30.7 (1.21)	29.0 (1.14)	22.5 (0.89)	17.9 (0.70)	25.4 (1.00)	6.3 (0.25)	6.3 (0.25)	32.9 (1.30)	31.4 (1.24)	61.6 (2.43)	56.4 (2.22)	370.7 (14.61)
Source 1: National Observatory of Athens Monthly Bulletins (May 2016 - Mar 2024)
Source 2: Nikaia N.O.A station, World Meteorological Organization

== Transport ==
Nikaia metro station of line 3 is situated in the city. There are also many buses servicing the city (OSY).

== History ==
On August 17, 1944 the Executions of Kokkinia took place. It was the largest Nazi roundup and one of the largest-scale war crimes committed during the German occupation of Greece.

Nikaia, like many other places around Greece, owes its population eruption to Greek refugees who were forced out of Asia Minor after the 1919-1922 Greco-Turkish war ended. It was part of the municipality of Piraeus until 1933, when it became a separate municipality, then still under the name Nea Kokkinia. It was renamed to Nikaia in 1940.

The 8th International Tournament of Nikaia, a chess tournament, took place between August 19 and 27, 2000. The Greek Weightlifting Grand Prix took place in Nikaia on December 9 and 10, 2003.

== Sports ==
Nikaia has five sport clubs with important history. These are Proodeftiki with a great successful history in the football, Ionikos Nikaias with successful departments in the football (Ionikos) and basketball (Ionikos Nikaias B.C.), Chalkidona, A.E. Nikaias, and Aris Nikaias.

Sport clubs based in Nikaia
Club	Founded	Sports	Achievements
Proodeftiki	1927	Football, Basketball	Long-time presence in Superleague
Chalkidona F.C.	1930	Football	Earlier presence in Superleague
Ionikos Nikaias	1965	Football, Basketball, Water Polo	Long-time presence in Superleague (taking part in the 1999-2000 UEFA Cup), earlier presence in A1 Basketball
Aris Nikaias	1973 (refounded)	Basketball, Handball, Water Polo	Panhellenic titles in women handball
A.E. Nikaias	1974 (refounded)	Football, Volleyball	One Greek cup in volleyball

== Sites of interest ==
- Klimakia Gallery
- Nikaia Olympic Weightlifting Hall, a hall which was used for weightlifting in the 2004 Summer Olympics. Website
- Platon National Sports Centre
- Nikaia Municipal Gymnasium for Proodeftiki
- Neapoli Stadium for Ionikos FC
- Katrakeio Theater, an open-air theater dedicated to Manos Katrakis

== Historical population ==
Year	Municipality
1981	90,368
1991	87,597
2001	93,086
2011	89,380
2021	88,077
