= Kilkisiakos F.C. =

Greek football club

Kilkisiakos
- Full name: Athlitikos Omilos Kilkisiakos
- Nickname: Βυσσινί (Crimson)
- Founded: 1961; 65 years ago
- Ground: Municipal Stadium of Kilkis
- Capacity: 6,000
- Investor: Chronis Papavramidis
- Chairman: Pavlos Tonikidis
- Manager: Tasos Doumas
- League: Gamma Ethniki
- 2025–26: Gamma Ethniki (Group 1), 10th
Home colours

Kilkisiakos Football Club (Greek: Α.Ο. Κιλκισιακός) is a Greek football club, based in Kilkis, Greece.

== History ==
Kilkisiakos is an athletic football club of Kilkis, founded in 1961 after the merger of the local clubs AEK, Aris and Megas Alexandros Kilkis.

During the 1964–65 season, the club competed in the Beta Ethniki for the first time in its history, remaining in the second tier until the end of the 1966–67 season. In 1969, the club won the Kilkis FCA championship and secured promotion back to the Beta Ethniki through the special promotion play-offs, establishing itself in the second tier for six consecutive seasons, from 1969–70 through 1974–75. In 1976, the club won the Kilkis FCA championship and qualified for the special promotion play-off tournament, where it finished 1st in Group 1 to secure its return to the Beta Ethniki. The team subsequently competed in the second division for four consecutive seasons, from 1976–77 through 1979–80.

In the 1980–81 season, the club competed in the National Amateur Division, the third tier of the Greek football pyramid. By finishing 2nd in Group 4 as runners-up, the team secured promotion back to the Beta Ethniki, where it played during the 1981–82 and 1982–83 campaigns. After two seasons in the Gamma Ethniki, the club was crowned champion of the Northern Group in the 1984–85 season and returned to the Beta Ethniki, competing there once more in 1985–86 and 1986–87, which marked its final appearances in the second tier.

In the following years, the club established itself in the Gamma Ethniki and Delta Ethniki championships. In 1998, it reached the final of the Greek Amateur Cup, where it was defeated by Akratitos at the Athens Olympic Stadium. During the 2004–05 season, the team finished 12th in Group 2 of the Delta Ethniki and was relegated to the Kilkis FCA local championship after a long and continuous presence in the national divisions. The very next season (2005–06), the club was crowned Kilkis FCA champion and earned promotion back to the Delta Ethniki.

In 2007, the club reached the final of the Greek Amateur Cup once again, losing to Doxa Megalopoli. During the 2012–13 season, Kilkisiakos earned promotion to the newly formed amateur Gamma Ethniki, as the fourth national tier ceased to exist starting the following season. In the subsequent 2013–14 campaign, the club finished tied on points with Orfeas Eleftheroupoli; however, disadvantageous head-to-head results (a 1–1 draw away and a 0–2 loss at home) relegated Kilkisiakos to 9th place in Group 1 of the Gamma Ethniki, resulting in relegation back to the Kilkis FCA championship due to the previous abolition of the Delta Ethniki.

During the 2014–15 season, the club was crowned champion of the Kilkis FCA and contested promotion back to the Gamma Ethniki through the special promotion play-offs, albeit unsuccessfully, as it finished 2nd in a non-qualifying spot behind Apollon Krya Vrysi. Two years later, in the 2016–17 season, it was once again crowned Kilkis FCA champion and earned direct promotion to the Gamma Ethniki. Its presence in the division was brief, as in the following 2017–18 season it finished 11th in Group 2 and was relegated. In 2018–19, the team captured the Kilkis FCA title once more, securing promotion to the newly structured amateur Gamma Ethniki, which by then functioned as the fourth tier of the Greek league system. During the 2019–20 season, Kilkisiakos competed in the Gamma Ethniki, finishing in 11th place, which resulted in relegation back to the Kilkis FCA First Division for the 2020–21 season.

In the 2023–24 season, the club won the Kilkis FCA championship and secured a place in the promotion play-offs, through which it achieved promotion back to the national divisions after a four-year absence.

In the 2024–25 season, Kilkisiakos defeated PAOK Kristoni 4–3 on penalties following a 0–0 draw after extra time, capturing the Kilkis FCA Cup for the 15th time in its history.

== Honours ==
=== Domestic ===
  - Gamma Ethniki: 1
    - 1984–85
  - Delta Ethniki: 2
    - 1991–92, 1997–98
  - Greek FCA Winners' Championship: 1
    - 1975–76
  - Kilkis FCA Championship: 11
    - 1961–62, 1962–63, 1963–64, 1967–68, 1968–69, 1975–76, 2005–06, 2014–15, 2016–17, 2018–19, 2023–24
  - Kilkis FCA Cup: 15
    - 1963–64, 1964–65, 1966–67, 1975–76, 1991–92, 1995–96, 1996–97, 1997–98, 2004–05, 2005–06, 2006–07, 2012–13, 2014–15, 2023–24, 2024–25
