= Chalkida F.C. =

Football club in Greece

AC Chalkis
- Full name: Athletic Football Club of Chalkis
- Nicknames: Μπλε (Blue); Νερατζούρι (Nerazzurri); Κυανόμαυροι (Cyan-Blacks)
- Short name: AOH
- Founded: 22 July 1967; 59 years ago
- Ground: Municipal Stadium of Chalkis
- Capacity: 1,694
- Chairman: Vasilios Tarnanas
- Manager: Georgios Lamprou
- League: Evia FCA First Division
- 2025–26: Evia FCA First Division, 5th
- Website: https://aochalkis.gr/
Home colours	Away colours

Athletic Club Chalkis (Greek: Αθλητικός Όμιλος Χαλκίς), also known as AC Chalkida, is an association football club based in Chalkida, Greece. The club was founded in 1967 upon the merger of Olympiakos Chalkida and Evrypos Chalkida. Its colours are black and blue and its symbol is the nymph Arethusa.

Their greatest honour was winning the Beta Ethniki in 1968 and playing in the 1968–69 Alpha Ethniki.

== History ==
=== Before the merger ===
A.C. Chalkis was founded in 1967 after a merger between the biggest clubs in the city, Olympiakos Chalkida and Evrypos, who were both competing in the Greek Second Division at the time, with Olympiakos finishing 4th and Evrypos 9th.

Due to a law by the regime of the Colonels which ruled Greece since April 1967, athletic clubs that were based in the same city were forced to merge with each other. As a result, Olympiakos Chalkida and Evrypos were merged in summer 1967 and the resulting club was named A.C. Chalkis in order to represent the city of Chalkis as a whole.

=== A.C. Chalkis ===
In the following 1967–68 season and first one after the merger, Chalkida finished 1st in Beta Ethniki's Northern Group and was promoted to the Alpha Ethniki for the first time. However, they were immediately relegated after one season, as they finished 17th in the 1968–69 Alpha Ethniki, second last only to AEL Limassol.

Until 1989 the team competed in the Beta and Gamma Ethniki championships, without repeating the success of their first season, although they won 2 Gamma Ethniki championships in 1977 and 1987. From 1989 to 1996 the team was competing in the lower Gamma and Delta Ethniki championships, and from 1996 to 2003 only in the Delta Ethniki.

=== Decline ===
In 2003 A.C. Chalkis returned to the national championships after seven years, participating in the 2003–04 season of Gamma Ethniki and finishing 11th. Although having finished in a safe mid-table position, the team was in a financial turmoil; the entire squad was released and negotiations with potential investors were unsuccessful. After a planned merger with local club Doxa Prokopiou was not implemented, Chalkida decided to pull out of every championship, remain inactive for a year and re-appear at the local Evia Football Club Association leagues for the 2005–06 season.

A.C. Chalkis finished 1st in the A1 Division of Evia and was promoted to the Delta Ethniki in 2010. The club also won the Evia Amateur Cup six times and finished as runners-up once, with their last victory being in 2012.

== Honours ==
- Beta Ethniki
  - Winners (1): 1967–68
- Gamma Ethniki
  - Winners (1): 1986–87
- Delta Ethniki
  - Winners (3): 1991–92, 1993–94, 2002–03
- Evia FCA Championship
  - Winners (4): 1976–77, 2009–10, 2014–15, 2021–22
- Evia FCB Championship
  - Winners (1): 2007–08
- Evia FCA Cup
  - Winners (7): 1994, 1997, 1998, 1999, 2011, 2012, 2018
  - Runners-up (1): 2000
