= Pannafpliakos Iraklis F.C. =

Pannafpliakos
- Full name: Πανναυπλιακός - Ηρακλής Γυμναστικός Σύλλογος
- Nickname: Κανόνια (Cannons)
- Founded: 1924; 102 years ago
- Ground: Municipal Stadium of Nafplion
- Capacity: 2,000
- Chairman: Pavlos Sierros
- Manager: Vasilis Georgakopoulos
- League: Argolida FCA Second Division
- 2025–26: Argolida FCA First Division, 14th (relegated)
Home colours	Away colours

Pannafpliakos F.C. is a Greek football club, based in Nafplion, Argolis.

The club was founded in 1924. They played in Gamma Ethniki for the 2024-25 season.

== History ==
Logo of Pannafpliakos until 2017

Pannafpiakos G.S. founded in 1924. 1955 merged with Iraklis Pronoia which had been founded in 1929 and founded the Pannafpliakos-Iraklis G.S.. In the summer of 2011, Hellenic Football Federation approved the merger of Pannafpliakos-Iraklis G.S. with Enosi Midea F.C.. The purpose of the merger was the return of Pannafpliakos to national categories from which was far away that time. The club emerged from the merger named Pannafpliakos F.C. 2011 / Enosi Midea. Team colors set the red - white - green, official logo the canon. In the summer of 2017 the club renamed Pannafpliakos-Iraklis Pronoias 1924. In the summer of 2011, Hellenic Football Federation approved the merger of Pannafpliakos with Nafplio 2017 F.C. so the club renamed Pannafpliakos 2017. In 2023 the club renamed Pannafpliakos-Iraklis G.S.

== Honors ==
=== Domestic Titles and honors ===
  - Argolida FCA Champions: 10
    - 1965–66, 1967–68, 1968–69, 1974–75, 1976–77, 1979–80, 1997–98, 2001–02, 2007–08, 2023–24
  - Argolida FCA Cup Winners: 11
    - 1974–75, 1976–77, 1978–79, 1981–82, 1988–89, 1989–90, 1990–91, 1997–98, 2000–01, 2008–09, 2011–12
  - Argolida FCA Super Cup Winners: 1
    - 2011
  - Argolidokorinthia FCA Champions: 2
    - 1957–58, 1959–60
