= APE Langadas F.C. =

A.P.E. Langadas
- Full name: Athlitiki Podosfairiki Enosi Langadas
- Founded: 1949; 77 years ago
- Ground: Langadas Municipal Stadium
- Chairman: Georgios Koukos
- Manager: Evangelos Mavrovouniotis
- League: Macedonia FCA First Division
- 2025–26: Macedonia FCA Second Division (Group 2), 2nd (promoted)
- Website: https://apelfc.gr/
Home colours	Away colours

Athlitiki Podosfairiki Enosi Langadas (Greek: Αθλητική Ποδοσφαιρική Ένωση Λαγκαδά), commonly known as A.P.E. Langadas or A.P.E.L., is a Greek football club based in Lagkadas, Thessaloniki, Greece. The club was founded in 1949. Its emblem features a double-headed eagle, while its traditional colours are blue and white. A.P.E. Langadas plays its home matches at the Langadas Municipal Stadium.

A.P.E. Langadas is the record winner of the Macedonia Football Clubs Association Cup, having won the competition four times, in 1982, 1992, 1997 and 2013. The club has also competed as high as the Beta Ethniki, the second tier of Greek football.

== History ==
In 1950, A.P.E.L. was officially recognised by the Hellenic Football Federation (HFF) and was assigned registration number 282. The club joined the Macedonia Football Clubs Association and gradually progressed through its divisions, reaching the EPS Macedonia First Division in the 1966–67 season.

In 1973, A.P.E.L. won the First Division championship and qualified for the special amateur promotion championship, where it competed for promotion to the Beta Ethniki but was unsuccessful.

Seven years later, in 1980, the club once again won the EPS Macedonia First Division championship and was promoted to the National Amateur Division. In 1982, A.P.E.L. earned promotion to the Beta Ethniki after being crowned champion of Group 7 of the National Amateur Division in the 1981–82 season.

As a result, the club competed in the Beta Ethniki during the 1982–83 season. A.P.E.L. finished 11th in the Northern Group but was relegated due to a restructuring of the league that season, under which the bottom 11 of the 20 participating teams were relegated.

Following its relegation, A.P.E.L. competed in the Gamma Ethniki for four consecutive seasons, from 1983–84 to 1986–87, before being relegated. The club subsequently competed in the Delta Ethniki, where it was relegated after one season.

In 1995, after winning the EPS Macedonia First Division championship, A.P.E.L. returned to the national divisions. The club competed in the Delta Ethniki for three seasons before being relegated in 1998.

During the following years, A.P.E.L. competed between the A1 and First Divisions of EPS Macedonia. In 2015, the club was crowned A1 Division champion and qualified for the special amateur promotion championship. After finishing first in Group 2, it earned promotion to the Gamma Ethniki, returning to the national third tier after 28 years.

A.P.E.L. remained in the Gamma Ethniki for four consecutive seasons, from 2015–16 to 2018–19, before being relegated.

A difficult period followed for the club. In the 2019–20 season, A.P.E.L. was relegated from the A1 Division to the First Division. It did not enter the championship in the 2020–21 season and subsequently suspended its operations.

After three years of inactivity, A.P.E.L. was reactivated in the summer of 2023 and returned to competition, starting from the EPS Macedonia Third Division.

In its first two seasons after returning, A.P.E.L. won back-to-back championships. The second title was achieved undefeated, with the club also recording the best defensive record across all EPS Macedonia championships, securing its return to the First Division.

In the 2025–26 season, A.P.E.L. finished second in Group 2 of the EPS Macedonia First Division and took part in the promotion play-offs. The club secured promotion and returned to the A1 Division.

== Honours ==
=== National ===
- Gamma Ethniki
  - Winners (1): 1981–82

=== Regional ===
- Macedonia FCA First Division
  - Winners (4): 1972–73, 1979–80, 1994–95, 2014–15
- Macedonia FCA Cup
  - Winners (4): 1981–82, 1991–92, 1996–97, 2012–13
