= PAO Thriamvos Athens =

Greek Sports Club

- Founded: 1930
- Team history: Doxa Athens; 1930-1967; Phoebus Athens; 1946-1967; Thriamvos Athens; 1967-present
- Colours: Green, Blue
- Titles: 1

PAO Thriamvos Athinon (Greek: ΠΑΟ Θρίαμβος Αθηνών) is a Greek sport club based in Athens. It was founded in 1930, originally under the name Mikrasiatiki Athens and later Doxa Athens. It has departments in football, basketball and handball. The club is based in the neighbourhood of Athens, Neos Kosmos. Because some departments of the club use the sport facilities of nearby suburb Dafni, the club is also named PAO Thriamvos Athinon/Dafnis.

== History ==
The club was existed during interwar under the name Thriamvos Harokopou and Thriamvos Cynosarges. This club was dissolved during world war and the club refounded in 1967 from the merge of the clubs Phoebus Athens and Doxa Athens. Doxa Athens was founded in 1930, originally under the name Mikrasiatiki Athens and Phoebus was founded in 1946. From the founding's date of its predecessors, as founding date of the club refers 1930. Thriamvos Athens achieved to play eight times in Gamma Ethniki (third divisions), during the period 1983-1992, that was the most successful period for the club. Nevertheless, the most important success of the club was the win of Greek Women's Basketball Cup in 1998. This is the only panhellenic title of the club until now.

== Titles ==
- Greek Women's Basketball Cup
  - Winner (1): 1998
