= Eordaikos F.C. =

Greek football club

Eordaikos
- Full name: Filathlon Somatio Eordaikos Ptolemaida
- Nicknames: Lignitorihoi; Eordoi
- Founded: 1978; 48 years ago
- Ground: Ptolemaida Municipal Stadium "Emilios Theofanidis"
- Capacity: 2,000
- Chairman: Athanasios Kritsanis
- Manager: Nikos Katakalidis
- League: Gamma Ethniki
- 2025–26: Gamma Ethniki (Group 2), 8th
- Website: eordaikos.gr
Home colours	Away colours

Eordaikos Football Club (Greek: Φ.Σ. Εορδαϊκός) is a Greek football club based in Ptolemaida, Western Macedonia, Greece.

== History ==
The club named Eordaikos 2007 is following the history of Eordaikos which is one of the better known football clubs in Western Macedonia. Eordaikos was created in 1978 from the merge of two Ptolemaida teams, the team of Aris Ptolemaida with former presence in the second division and Ptolemaios, playing in the second and third division of the Greek tier and having successful runs in the Greek cup.

In 1996, the club due to serious financial problems merged with Iraklis Ptolemaida and renamed to PAS Ptolemaida. PAS Ptolemaida merged then with Anagennisi Ptolemaida to form A.S. Ptolemaida . In 2004 the Club changes its and name for another time to PAE Ptolemaida-Lignitorikhi. Finally, in 2007, the administrative council decided to rename the Club to T.A.P. Eordaikos 2007.

== Colours and Crest ==
The team colours are green and yellow, something unique in Greece. Eordaikos' success opened a new chapter in the football history of the prefecture Kozani.

== Stadium ==
National Stadium of Ptolemaida - Emilios Theofanidis (In honour of Emilios Theofanidis, footballer of AEK Athens and PAOK in the late-1960s and early-1970s)

== Honours ==
=== Domestic ===
League

- Third Division
  - Winners (1): 1978–79
- Kozani FCA First Division
  - Winners (4): 2013–14, 2014–15, 2022–23, 2024–25

Cup

- Kozani FCA Cup
  - Winners (1): 2023–24
