= Gamma Ethniki =

Third-tier men's association football league in Greece

- Organising body: Hellenic Football Federation
- Founded: 1965; 61 years ago (unofficially); 1982; 44 years ago (officially)
- Folded: 1967; 59 years ago
- Country: Greece
- Confederation: UEFA
- Number of clubs: 113 (since 2026–27)
- Level on pyramid: 3 (1965–1967, 1977–2019 & 2021–present); 4 (2019–2021)
- Promotion to: Super League 2
- Relegation to: Local Football Clubs Associations Championships
- Domestic cup: Greece Amateurs Cup
- Last champions: Panthrakikos (Group 1); Apollon Kalamaria (Group 2); Elassona (Group 3); PAS Pyrgos (Group 4); Aris Petroupoli (Group 5); Ethnikos Piraeus (Group 6) (2025–26)
- Top scorer: Dimitris Verbis (161 goals)
- Website: epo.gr/g-ethniki
- Current: 2026–27 Gamma Ethniki

The Gamma Ethniki Katigoria (Greek: Γ΄ Εθνική Κατηγορία, lit. 'Third National Division') is the third-tier men's association football league in Greece.

== History ==
The Gamma Ethniki began in 1965 as an amateur championship, while in 1983 it was changed to professional. Although not literally national (it is divided into North and South groups), Football League 2 is considered as a national division.

On 3 August 2010, it was announced that the division had been renamed Football League 2. From the 2013–14 season, the football League 2 was merged with the fourth division championship (Delta Ethniki) and renamed Gamma Ethniki once more. The new third division is held in six groups, with the clubs divided on the basis of geographical criteria, while it returns in an amateur form. From the 2014–15 season until the 2016–17 season, the league was held in four groups, with the clubs divided basis of geographical criteria. The champion of each group was promoted to Super League 2.

From the 2017–18 season until the 2022–23 season, the league was held in eight groups, with the clubs divided by geographical criteria. The first team of each group qualified to a play-off tournament, consisting of two groups. The first two teams of each group were promoted to the Super League 2.

From 2023 onwards, the league is held in four groups with 18 clubs each. The top team of each group is promoted to the Super League 2 and bottom six teams are relegated to Local Championships.

For the 2025–26 season, the championship was held with a total of 73 teams participating, divided in 5 groups with 12 teams each and 1 group with 13 teams. At the end of the season, 4 teams were promoted to Super League 2 and 18 teams were relegated to Local FCA Championships.

For the 2026–27 season, the championship is expanded with a total of 113 teams participating, divided in 10 groups with 12 and 11 teams in most of them and 1 group with 10 teams. At the end of the season, 4 teams will be promoted to Super League 2 and 30 teams will be relegated to Local FCA Championships.

== Current groups ==
113 clubs in 10 groups will compete in the Gamma Ethniki during the 2026–27 season.

== Winners ==
=== Third Division champions ===
==== From 1965 to 1982 ====
| Season | Winner |
|---|---|
| 1965–66 | Levadiakos, Ergotelis, Ethnikos Alexandroupoli, Megas Alexandros Thessaloniki |
| 1966–67 | Asteras Zografou, AEK Faliro, Thermaikos, Elpida Drama |
| 1967–68 | Argonaftis Piraeus, Megas Alexandros Thessaloniki |
| 1968–69 | Anagennisi Arta, Anagennisi Karditsa |
| 1969–70 | Pandramaikos, Apollon Krya Vrysi, A.O. Karditsa, Panaspropyrgiakos, Acharnaikos, Ergotelis, Panargiakos, Foinikas Polichni, Aris Agios Konstantinos |
| 1970–71 | Orestis Orestiada, Naoussa, Orchomenos, P.A.O. Rouf, Orfeas Egaleo, Paniliakos |
| 1971–72 | Anagennisi Epanomi, P. O. Moudania, Thiva, Ilisiakos, Phoebus Kremasti, Pannemeatikos |
| 1972–73 | Nestos Chrysoupoli, Niki Polygyros, Achilleas Farsala, Lamia, Panetolikos, Panarkadikos, Syros, Olympiakos Nea Liosia, Apollon Mytilene |
| 1973–74 | Ethnikos Sidirokastro, A.O. Kozani, Makedonikos, Dimitra Trikala, A.P.S. Patras, Doxa Vyronas, Moschato, Diagoras |
| 1974–75 | Akrites Sykies, Kampaniakos, Rigas Feraios, Ethnikos Asteras, Agios Dimitrios, Amfiali, Orfeas Egaleo |
| 1975–76 | Kilkisiakos, Apollon Kalamarias, Ethnikos Sidirokastro, Anagennisi Arta, Niki Volos, Paniliakos, Kallithea, Irodotos |
| 1976–77 | Makedonikos, Edessaikos, Thyella Serres, P.O. Elassona, Chalkida, A.E. Messolonghi, Agios Dimitrios, Ionikos |
| 1977–78 | Anagennisi Arta, Acharnaikos, Anagennisi Giannitsa, Makedonikos Siatista |
| 1978–79 | Eordaikos, Panegialios, Vyzas Megara, Panthrakikos |
| 1979–80 | Pierikos, Chalkida, Apollon Pontus, Diagoras |
| 1980–81 | Toxotis Volos, Achaiki, Atromitos Piraeus, Kozani |
| 1981–82 | Paniliakos, Thiva, Florina, Alexandroupoli, Ionikos, Aiolikos, Levadiakos, APE Langadas |

==== From 1982 to 2013 ====
| Season | Winner | |
| | South Group | North Group |
|---|---|---|
| 1982–83 | Edessaikos | |
| 1983–84 | Aiolikos | Almopos Aridea |
| 1984–85 | Panetolikos | Kilkisiakos |
| 1985–86 | Charavgiakos | Skoda Xanthi |
| 1986–87 | Chalkida | Edessaikos |
| 1987–88 | Atromitos | Makedonikos |
| 1988–89 | Edessaikos | |
| 1989–90 | Proodeftiki | Anagennisi Giannitsa |
| 1990–91 | Doxa Vyronas | Naoussa |
| 1991–92 | Panetolikos | Pontioi Veria |
| 1992–93 | Kallithea | Anagennisi Karditsa |
| 1993–94 | Paniliakos | Panserraikos |
| 1994–95 | Doxa Vyronas | Kastoria |
| 1995–96 | Panetolikos | Niki Volos |
| 1996–97 | Ethnikos Asteras | Anagennisi Karditsa |
| 1997–98 | Ialysos | PAS Giannina |
| 1998–99 | Egaleo | Olympiacos Volos |
| 1999–00 | Akratitos | |
| 2000–01 | Patraikos | |
| 2001–02 | Kerkyra | |
| 2002–03 | Poseidon Neon Poron | |
| 2003–04 | Kastoria | |
| 2004–05 | Thrasyvoulos | Veria |
| 2005–06 | Asteras Tripolis | Agrotikos Asteras |
| 2006–07 | Agios Dimitrios | Pierikos |
| 2007–08 | Diagoras | Kavala |
| 2008–09 | Ilioupoli | Doxa Drama |
| 2009–10 | Kallithea | Veria |
| 2010–11 | Panachaiki | Anagennisi Epanomi |
| 2011–12 | Apollon Smyrnis | Ethnikos Gazoros |
| 2012–13 | Fostiras | Apollon Kalamarias |

==== From 2013 to 2019* ====
| Season | Winner |
|---|---|
| 2013–14 | Agrotikos Asteras, AEL, Lamia, Enosi Ermionida, Trachones, AEK Athens |
| 2014–15 | Panserraikos, Trikala, Panelefsiniakos, Kissamikos |
| 2015–16 | Aris, Aiginiakos, Sparta, OFI |
| 2016–17 | Apollon Kalamarias, Apollon Larissa, Panachaiki, Ergotelis |
| 2017–18 | Apollon Paralimnio, **Iraklis**, Tilikratis, **Volos**, Asteras Amaliadas, Ethnikos Piraeus, **Aittitos Spata**, **Irodotos**^{1} |
| 2018–19 | Kavala, Veria, Kronos Argyrades, Olympiacos Volos, Ierapetra, Ialysos, Egaleo, Aspropyrgos |

  - as the 3rd and 4th tier were merged in one league (3rd amateur tier)
- ^{1} In bold the champions which promoted to Football League (2nd tier).

=== Third (amateur) Division champions ===
==== From 2019 to 2021 ====
| Season | Winner |
|---|---|
| 2019–20 | Panserraikos, Almopos Aridea, Pierikos, AEP Karagiannia, Kallithea, Rodos, Asteras Vlachioti, Episkopi |
| 2020–21 | Orfeas Xanthi, Poseidon Nea Michaniona, **Anagennisi Karditsa**, Diagoras Stefanovikeio, PAS Acheron Kanallaki, Panionios, **A.E. Kifisia**, Thyella Rafina, **Zakynthos**, **Irodotos**^{1} |

- ^{1} In bold the champions which promoted to Super League 2.

=== Third Division champions ===
==== From 2021 to present ====
| Season | Winner |
|---|---|
| 2021–22 | Agrotikos Asteras, **Makedonikos**, **Iraklis Larissa**, **Panachaiki**, **Ilioupoli**, **Proodeftiki**, **P.A.O. Rouf**^{1} |
| 2022–23 | Aiolikos, Giouchtas, Kampaniakos, Kozani, Tilikratis |
| 2023–24 | Kavala, Ethnikos Neo Keramidi, Panargiakos, Panionios |
| 2024–25 | Nestos Chrysoupoli, Anagennisi Karditsa, Hellas Syros, Marko |
| 2025–26 | **Panthrakikos**, **Apollon Kalamaria**, Elassona, **PAS Pyrgos**, Aris Petroupoli, Ethnikos Piraeus |

- ^{1} In bold the champions which promoted to Super League 2.

== See also ==
- Greek Football Amateur Cup
- Greek football league system
- Gamma Ethniki Cup
- Football records and statistics in Greece
- Women's Gamma Ethniki
