= List of OFI Crete seasons =

OFI Crete Football Club seasons.

== Seasons ==
Season/Div.	Greek League																			Greek Cup	Greek Super Cup	Europe
Season/Div.	Total									Home					Away					Greek Cup	Greek Super Cup	Europe
Season/Div.	Pos	Pts	Pld	W	D	L	F	A	GD	W	D	L	F	A	W	D	L	F	A	Greek Cup	Greek Super Cup	Europe
1960 B
1961 B
1962 B
1962–63 B
1963–64 B
1964–65 B
1965–66 B
1966–67 B
1967–68 B
1968–69 A	12	64	34	12	6	16	37	45	-8	10	3	4	28	14	2	3	12	9	31	Quarter-finals		
1969–70 A	13	63	34	11	7	16	33	40	-7	10	5	2	27	12	1	2	14	6	28	Quarter-finals		
1970–71 A	17	55	34	5	11	18	28	61	-33	3	9	5	21	25	2	2	13	7	36			
1971–72 B
1972–73 B
1973–74 B
1974–75 B
1974–75 B
1976–77 A	6	33	34	14	5	15	57	51	+6	12	3	2	41	14	2	2	13	16	37			
1977–78 A	8	32	34	9	14	11	32	47	-15	9	8	0	23	10	0	6	11	9	37			
1978–79 A	7	34	34	14	6	14	37	42	-5	13	4	0	31	7	1	2	14	6	35			
1979–80 A	11	32	34	11	10	13	38	45	-7	10	6	1	28	12	1	4	12	10	33			
1980–81 A	10	32	34	11	10	13	33	37	-4	10	5	2	28	14	1	5	11	5	23			
1981–82 A	9	33	34	11	11	12	38	36	+2	10	3	4	25	12	1	8	8	13	24	Quarter-finals		
1982–83 A	7	37	34	14	9	11	53	48	+5	11	5	1	33	12	3	4	10	20	36			
1983–84 A	8	27	30	11	5	14	31	39	-8	10	2	3	25	14	1	3	11	6	25			
1984–85 A	10	26	30	10	6	14	46	49	-3	7	5	3	32	20	3	1	11	14	29			
1985–86 A	2	38	30	16	6	8	41	31	+10	11	2	2	22	8	5	4	6	19	23	Quarter-finals		
1986–87 A	3	38	30	17	4	9	44	27	+17	13	2	0	34	8	4	2	9	10	19	Winners	Runners-up	UC-R1
1987–88 A	4	37	30	17	3	10	54	41	+13	13	1	1	38	11	4	2	9	16	30	Semi-finals		CWC-R2
1988–89 A	5	34	30	13	8	9	45	36	+9	10	3	2	29	14	3	5	7	16	22	Quarter-finals		
1989–90 A	6	36	34	16	4	14	52	41	+11	12	2	3	38	14	4	2	11	14	27	Runners-up		
1990–91 A	8	34	34	11	12	11	37	38	-1	9	5	3	23	13	2	7	8	14	25	Quarter-finals		
1991–92 A	6	34	34	11	12	11	34	30	+4	9	7	1	25	11	2	5	10	9	19	Quarter-finals		
1992–93 A	4	66	34	19	9	6	64	32	+32	12	4	1	43	12	7	5	5	21	20	Quarter-finals		
1993–94 A	7	47	34	13	8	13	55	42	+13	13	3	1	44	12	0	5	12	11	30	Round of 32		UC-R3
1994–95 A	9	49	34	15	4	15	40	38	+2	11	1	5	26	14	4	3	10	14	24			
1995–96 A	5	57	34	17	6	11	57	52	+5	11	5	1	32	14	6	1	10	25	38	Round of 16		
1996–97 A	3	66	34	20	6	8	51	28	+23	14	2	1	34	9	6	4	7	17	19	Round of 16		
1997–98 A	7	49	34	15	4	15	45	53	-8	12	2	3	31	15	3	2	12	14	38	Fourth round		UC-R2
1998–99 A	8	51	34	16	3	15	50	44	+6	10	2	5	36	19	6	1	10	14	25	Second round		
1999–2000 A	4	63	34	18	9	7	60	44	+16	11	3	3	36	24	7	6	4	24	20	Quarter-finals		
2000–01 A	12	33	30	8	9	13	39	49	-10	3	8	4	22	21	5	1	9	17	28			UC-R2
2001–02 A	8	33	26	9	6	11	32	35	-3	6	3	4	18	10	3	3	7	14	25	Round of 16		
2002–03 A	8	44	30	12	8	10	39	34	+5	9	2	4	24	14	3	6	6	15	20	Round of 16		
2003–04 A	11	29	30	7	8	15	27	44	-17	4	5	6	16	19	3	3	9	11	25	Round of 16		
2004–05 A	13	32	30	8	8	14	36	44	-8	6	5	4	23	14	2	3	10	13	30	Round of 16		
2005–06 A	13	31	30	7	10	13	23	37	-14	6	5	4	17	13	1	5	9	6	24	Round of 32		
2006–07 A	7	42	30	12	6	12	41	45	-4	8	3	4	24	18	4	3	8	17	27	Round of 16		
2007–08 A	12	32	30	9	5	16	39	49	-10	7	1	7	23	18	2	4	9	16	31	Quarter-finals		

== Overall seasons table ==
Win	Draw	Loss
2 pts	1 pt	0 pt

Total										Home					Away				
Division	Seasons	Pts	Pld	W	D	L	F	A	GD	W	D	L	F	A	W	D	L	F	A
D1	35	1136	1130	439	258	433	1468	1454	+14	335	134	96	1000	491	104	124	337	468	963
