= Timis Bardis =

Greek footballer (born 1997)

Timis Bardis Τίμης Μπάρδης
Personal information
- Full name: Timis Bardis
- Date of birth: 1 July 1997 (age 29)
- Place of birth: Gjirokastër, Albania
- Position: Midfielder

Team information
- Current team: Maccabi Ahi Nazareth

Senior career*
Years	Team	Apps	(Gls)
2014–2016	Diagoras		
2015	→ Kleovoulos Lindos (loan)		
2016	Iraklis Lardou		
2017	Asteras Pastida		
2017	AER Afantou		
2018	Apollon Kalythies		
2018	Phoebus Kremasti		
2019	Ialysos		
2019	AER Afantou		
2020	Ialysos		
2021	Maccabi Ahi Nazareth	18	(1)
2021	Egnatia	7	(0)
2022	Maccabi Ahi Nazareth	7	(0)
2022–	Ialysos	0	(0)
- * Club domestic league appearances and goals as of 1 June 2022

Timis Bardis (Greek: Τίμης Μπάρδης; born 1 July 1997) is a Greek professional footballer who plays as a midfielder for Greek club Ialysos.
