= Albert Roussos =

Greek footballer

Personal information
- Date of birth: 22 February 1996 (age 30)
- Place of birth: Rhodes, Greece
- Height: 1.84 m (6 ft 1/2 in)
- Position: Defender

Team information
- Current team: Ialysos

Youth career
- –2011: Diagoras
- 2012–2015: Juventus

Senior career*
Years	Team	Apps	(Gls)
2011	Diagoras	13	(0)
2015–2016	Juventus	0	(0)
2015–2016	→ Cercle Brugge (loan)	1	(0)
2016	→ Panthrakikos (loan)	3	(0)
2016–2017	Iraklis	16	(0)
2017–2018	OFI	5	(0)
2018	Panserraikos	13	(0)
2018–2019	Volos	2	(0)
2019–2020	AER Afantou		
2020–2021	Pyli Kos		
2021	Ialysos	12	(1)
2021–2022	Diagoras	0	(0)
2022	Rodos	0	(0)
2022	Ialysos		
2023	AER Afantou		
2023–2025	Iraklis Maritsa		
2025–	Ialysos		

International career
2013–2015	Greece U19	20	(0)
2016	Greece U21	2	(0)
- * Club domestic league appearances and goals as of 21:00, 1 January 2022 (UTC)

Albert Roussos (Greek: Άλμπερτ Ρούσσος; born 22 February 1996) is a Greek professional footballer who plays as a defender for Gamma Ethniki club Ialysos.

== Career ==
He made his Football League debut for Diagoras on 28 October 2011 in a game against Kallithea.

After a short spell at AERA Afantou, Roussos joined AO Pyliou at the end of January 2020.

== Honours ==
Volos

- Football League: 2018–19
