= Dionysis Makrydimitris =

Greek footballer

Personal information
- Full name: Dionysios Makrydimitris
- Date of birth: 26 January 1985 (age 41)
- Place of birth: Rhodes, Greece
- Height: 1.80 m (5 ft 11 in)
- Positions: Defender; midfielder

Youth career
- –2003: OF Istrou

Senior career*
Years	Team	Apps	(Gls)
2003–2008	Rodos	76	(1)
2008–2011	Kerkyra	26	(1)
2011–2014	Panthrakikos	39	(1)
2014–2015	Olympiacos Volos	26	(2)
2015–2016	Agrotikos Asteras	26	(0)
2016–2018	Panachaiki	16	(0)
2018–2020	Ialysos	19	(2)
2020–2022	Rodos	7	(1)
2022–2023	AER Afantou		
2023–2025	Kleovoulos Lindos		
- * Club domestic league appearances and goals as of 26 June 2021

Dionysis Makrydimitris (Greek: Διονύσης Μακρυδημήτρης; born 26 January 1985) is a Greek professional footballer who plays as a defender or a defensive midfielder.

== Career ==
Born in Rhodes, Makrydimitris began playing football with local side Rodos F.C. in the Delta Ethniki. He helped the club to gain promotion to the Gamma Ethniki, before signing with Kerkyra in 2008. Since the summer of 2011, he plays for Panthrakikos.
