= Thomas Bibiris =

Greek footballer

Personal information
- Date of birth: 7 March 1985 (age 41)
- Place of birth: Kozani, Greece
- Height: 1.85 m (6 ft 1 in)
- Position: Midfielder

Team information
- Current team: Rodos
- Number: 4

Senior career*
Years	Team	Apps	(Gls)
2003–2005	Akratitos	4	(0)
2005–2007	Vyzas Megara	67	(5)
2007–2008	Aias Salamina	19	(0)
2008–	Rodos	67	(5)
- * Club domestic league appearances and goals as of 1 July 2011

Thomas Bibiris (Greek: Θωμάς Μπιμπίρης; born 7 March 1985) is a Greek footballer who plays for Rodos F.C. in the Beta Ethniki.

== Career ==
Born in Kozani, Bibiris began his professional career with Akratitos, where he appeared in four Super League Greece matches.
