= 1969–70 Beta Ethniki =

Beta Ethniki
- Season: 1969–70
- Dates: 5 October 1969 – 14 June 1970
- Champions: Apollon Athens (Group 1); Fostiras (Group 2); Veria (Group 3)
- Promoted: Apollon Athens; Fostiras; Veria
- Relegated: Irodotos; Preveza; Leonidas Sparta; Orchomenos; Apollon Mytilene; Thiva; Orestis Orestiada; Megas Alexandros Thessaloniki; Thermaikos Thermis
- Top goalscorer: Kostas Papageorgiou (41 goals)

Beta Ethniki 1969–70 complete season.

== Group 1 ==
=== League table ===
Pos	Team	Pld	W	D	L	GF	GA	GD	Pts	Promotion or relegation
1	Apollon Athens (C, P)	34	28	5	1	100	17	+83	95	Promotion to Alpha Ethniki
2	Korinthos	34	19	6	9	58	28	+30	78	
3	Anagennisi Arta	34	16	12	6	46	28	+18	78	
4	Kallithea	34	16	10	8	72	23	+49	76	
5	Kalamata	34	15	9	10	43	32	+11	72 (Note: Kalamata had 1 point deducted.)	
6	Panetolikos	34	15	7	12	47	33	+14	71	
7	PAS Giannina	34	14	9	11	38	27	+11	71	
8	Chania	34	11	11	12	46	38	+8	67	
9	Koropi	34	10	13	11	45	40	+5	67	
10	Ethnikos Asteras	34	11	11	12	43	48	−5	67	
11	Kerkyra	34	12	8	14	47	45	+2	66	
12	AFC Patra	34	12	8	14	36	37	−1	66	
13	Panegialios	34	9	12	13	34	46	−12	64	
14	Pannafpliakos	34	11	7	16	36	53	−17	63	
15	Panarkadikos	34	8	12	14	30	52	−22	62	
16	Irodotos (R)	34	7	13	14	32	39	−7	61	Relegation to C National Amateur Division
17	Preveza (R)	34	8	7	19	28	71	−43	57	Relegation to C National Amateur Division
18	Leonidas Sparta (R)	36	3	4	29	24	116	−92	42 (Note: ?4 points deducted?)	Relegation to C National Amateur Division

(C) Champions; (P) Promoted; (R) Relegated

== Group 2 ==
=== League table ===
Pos	Team	Pld	W	D	L	GF	GA	GD	Pts	Promotion or relegation
1	Fostiras (C, P)	34	21	8	5	63	19	+44	84	Promotion to Alpha Ethniki
2	Trikala	34	18	10	6	55	26	+29	80	
3	Chalkida	34	18	10	6	48	25	+23	80	
4	Atromitos	34	15	8	11	44	31	+13	72	
5	Levadiakos	34	13	11	10	34	34	0	71	
6	Ikaros Athens	34	13	10	11	38	26	+12	70	
7	Aias Salamina	34	14	8	12	41	30	+11	70	
8	Anagennisi Karditsa	34	14	8	12	47	42	+5	70	
9	Atromitos Piraeus	34	11	14	9	33	34	−1	69 (Note: Atromitos Piraeus, Ionikos and Orchomenos had 1 point deducted.)	
10	Rodos	34	15	3	16	48	36	+12	67	
11	Panelefsiniakos	34	9	14	11	39	32	+7	66	
12	Argonaftis Piraeus	34	10	12	12	39	39	0	66	
13	Lamia	34	7	16	11	41	38	+3	64	
14	Ionikos	34	11	7	16	26	47	−21	62	
15	Niki Volos	34	15	5	14	31	32	−1	61 (Note: Niki Volos had 8 points deducted.)	
16	Orchomenos (R)	34	10	5	19	29	53	−24	58	Relegation to C National Amateur Division
17	Apollon Mytilene (R)	34	8	5	21	30	62	−32	55	Relegation to C National Amateur Division
18	Thiva (R)	34	4	6	24	28	98	−70	48	Relegation to C National Amateur Division

(C) Champions; (P) Promoted; (R) Relegated

== Group 3 ==
=== League table ===
Pos	Team	Pld	W	D	L	GF	GA	GD	Pts	Promotion or relegation
1	Veria (C, P)	34	25	6	3	75	19	+56	90	Promotion to Alpha Ethniki
2	Doxa Drama	34	24	5	5	66	21	+45	87	
3	Edessaikos	34	21	8	5	55	26	+29	84 (Note: ?0 or 1 point deducted?)	
4	Kastoria	34	17	8	9	56	34	+22	76	
5	Kilkisiakos	34	13	11	10	34	32	+2	71	
6	Ethnikos Alexandroupoli	34	14	7	13	38	46	−8	69	
7	Xanthi	34	13	8	13	34	31	+3	68	
8	Anagennisi Giannitsa	34	13	7	14	36	38	−2	67	
9	Makedonikos	34	8	15	11	31	34	−3	65	
10	Aris Ptolemaida	34	9	13	12	28	41	−13	65	
11	Kozani	34	10	10	14	36	36	0	64	
12	Apollon Kalamarias	34	8	14	12	34	40	−6	64	
13	AEL	34	9	11	14	34	45	−11	63	
14	Panthrakikos	34	7	12	15	26	47	−21	60	
15	AE Florina	34	7	11	16	32	44	−12	59	
16	Orestis Orestiada (R)	34	11	3	20	35	56	−21	59	Relegation to C National Amateur Division
17	Megas Alexandros Thessaloniki (R)	34	6	10	18	34	67	−33	56	Relegation to C National Amateur Division
18	Thermaikos Thermis (R)	34	6	8	20	25	52	−27	54	Relegation to C National Amateur Division

(C) Champions; (P) Promoted; (R) Relegated
