= 1971–72 Beta Ethniki =

Beta Ethniki
- Season: 1971–72
- Dates: 3 October 1971 – 25 June 1972
- Champions: Kalamata (Group 1); Atromitos (Group 2); Panserraikos (Group 3)
- Promoted: Kalamata; Atromitos; Panserraikos
- Relegated: Panetolikos; Panarkadikos; Leonidas Sparta; Lamia; Orchomenos; Apollon Mytilene; Kozani; Aris Ptolemaida; Orestis Orestiada

Beta Ethniki 1971–72 complete season.

== Group 1 ==
=== League table ===
Pos	Team	Pld	W	D	L	GF	GA	GD	Pts	Promotion or relegation
1	Kalamata (C, P)	38	20	11	7	59	25	+34	89	Promotion to Alpha Ethniki
2	Ikaros Athens	38	19	10	9	39	19	+20	86	
3	Chania	38	20	7	11	42	32	+10	85	
4	OFI	38	20	3	15	58	42	+16	81	
5	Kallithea	38	14	14	10	30	22	+8	80	
6	Pannafpliakos	38	15	10	13	43	38	+5	78	
7	Korinthos	38	15	10	13	39	34	+5	78	
8	Argonaftis Piraeus	38	16	7	15	46	41	+5	77	
9	Aias Salamina	38	14	11	13	50	37	+13	76 (Note: Aias Salamina and Leonidas Sparta had 1 point deducted.)	
10	Anagennisi Arta	38	15	8	15	44	38	+6	76	
11	Paniliakos	38	14	10	14	30	37	−7	76	
12	Panargiakos	38	13	11	14	44	47	−3	75	
13	PAS Giannina	38	13	10	15	38	36	+2	74	
14	Kerkyra	38	14	7	17	45	47	−2	73	
15	Panegialios	38	13	9	16	33	37	−4	73	
16	Panaspropyrgiakos	38	12	11	15	30	36	−6	73	
17	Orfeas Egaleo	38	11	13	14	26	41	−15	73	
18	Panetolikos (R)	38	11	11	16	28	40	−12	70 (Note: ?1 point deducted?)	Qualification for Relegation play-off
19	Panarkadikos (R)	38	10	11	17	31	47	−16	69	Relegation to C National Amateur Division
20	Leonidas Sparta (R)	38	6	6	26	21	80	−59	55	Relegation to C National Amateur Division

(C) Champions; (P) Promoted; (R) Relegated

== Group 2 ==
=== League table ===
Pos	Team	Pld	W	D	L	GF	GA	GD	Pts	Promotion or relegation
1	Atromitos (C, P)	38	24	10	4	58	21	+37	96	Promotion to Alpha Ethniki
2	Proodeftiki	38	23	11	4	68	25	+43	95	
3	APO Rouf	38	20	13	5	51	26	+25	91	
4	Lamia (R)	38	21	7	10	49	25	+24	87	Relegation to C National Amateur Division
5	Rodos	38	16	13	9	45	30	+15	83	
6	Anagennisi Karditsa	38	18	9	11	59	31	+28	82 (Note: Anagennisi Karditsa had 1 point deducted.)	
7	Acharnaikos	38	14	12	12	39	36	+3	78	
8	Chalkida	38	13	13	12	38	36	+2	77	
9	Panelefsiniakos	38	15	7	16	33	32	+1	75	
10	Koropi	38	11	13	14	36	27	+9	73	
11	Vyzas	38	11	14	13	49	49	0	73 (Note: ?1 or 2 points deducted?)	
12	Niki Volos	38	9	16	13	39	38	+1	72	
13	AO Karditsa	38	13	8	17	34	45	−11	72	
14	Ethnikos Asteras	38	13	8	17	40	52	−12	72	
15	Levadiakos	38	11	11	16	21	37	−16	71	
16	Ionikos	38	9	15	14	25	41	−16	71	
17	Atromitos Piraeus	38	8	15	15	36	49	−13	69	
18	AFC Patra (O)	38	8	12	18	25	55	−30	66	Qualification for Relegation play-off
19	Orchomenos (R)	38	6	11	21	27	76	−49	60 (Note: ?1 point deducted?)	Relegation to C National Amateur Division
20	Apollon Mytilene (R)	38	5	6	27	28	69	−41	51 (Note: ?3 points deducted?)	Relegation to C National Amateur Division

(C) Champions; (O) Play-off winners; (P) Promoted; (R) Relegated

== Group 3 ==
=== League table ===
Pos	Team	Pld	W	D	L	GF	GA	GD	Pts	Promotion or relegation
1	Panserraikos (C, P)	38	24	11	3	58	14	+44	97	Promotion to Alpha Ethniki
2	AEL	38	26	6	6	71	25	+46	96	
3	Apollon Kalamarias	38	17	16	5	52	21	+31	87 (Note: ?1 point deducted?)	
4	Doxa Drama	38	17	11	10	64	43	+21	83	
5	Kastoria	38	17	9	12	50	29	+21	81	
6	Naoussa	38	15	12	11	58	43	+15	80	
7	Panthrakikos	38	17	7	14	45	44	+1	79	
8	Apollon Krya Vrysi	38	12	13	13	40	51	−11	75	
9	Foinikas Polichni	38	13	10	15	37	42	−5	74	
10	Edessaikos	38	10	15	13	29	34	−5	73	
11	Anagennisi Giannitsa	38	11	12	15	39	48	−9	72	
12	Pyrsos Grevena	38	12	10	16	36	45	−9	72	
13	Makedonikos	38	7	20	11	28	37	−9	72	
14	Kilkisiakos	38	12	10	16	32	47	−15	72	
15	Xanthi	38	9	15	14	32	42	−10	71	
16	Pandramaikos	38	9	15	14	26	39	−13	71	
17	AE Florina	38	10	12	16	33	39	−6	70	
18	Kozani (R)	38	12	7	19	38	54	−16	69	Qualification for Relegation play-off
19	Aris Ptolemaida (R)	38	11	9	18	31	48	−17	69	Relegation to C National Amateur Division
20	Orestis Orestiada (R)	38	4	10	24	22	76	−54	56	Relegation to C National Amateur Division

(C) Champions; (P) Promoted; (R) Relegated

== Relegation play-off ==
Team 1	Score	Team 2
Panetolikos	1–0	Kozani
Panetolikos	0–0	AFC Patra
AFC Patra	3–0	Kozani

Pos	Team	Pld	W	D	L	GF	GA	GD	Pts	Relegation
1	AFC Patra	2	1	1	0	3	0	+3	5	
2	Panetolikos (R)	2	1	1	0	1	0	+1	5	Relegation to C National Amateur Division
3	Kozani (R)	2	0	0	2	0	4	−4	2	Relegation to C National Amateur Division

(R) Relegated
