= 1972–73 Beta Ethniki =

Beta Ethniki
- Season: 1972–73
- Dates: 1 October 1972 – 24 June 1973
- Champions: Apollon Athens (Group 1); AEL (Group 2); Apollon Kalamarias (Group 3)
- Promoted: Apollon Athens; AEL; Apollon Kalamarias
- Relegated: Asteras Amaliada; Pannemeatikos Nemea; Ethnikos Asteras; AFC Patra; Orfeas Egaleo; Thiva; Pyrsos Grevena; Apollon Krya Vrysi; AE Florina

Beta Ethniki 1972–73 complete season.

== Group 1 ==
=== League table ===
Pos	Team	Pld	W	D	L	GF	GA	GD	Pts	Promotion or relegation
1	Apollon Athens (C, P)	38	27	7	4	83	29	+54	99	Promotion to Alpha Ethniki
2	PAS Giannina	38	23	9	6	81	27	+54	93	
3	APO Rouf	38	19	9	10	51	27	+24	85	
4	Korinthos	38	17	11	10	54	45	+9	83	
5	Pannafpliakos	38	18	8	12	50	44	+6	82	
6	Anagennisi Arta	38	16	11	11	52	47	+5	81	
7	Panegialios	38	15	10	13	47	48	−1	78	
8	Acharnaikos	38	12	15	11	40	36	+4	77	
9	Ionikos	38	13	12	13	55	42	+13	76	
10	Panargiakos	38	13	12	13	49	47	+2	76	
11	Aias Salamina	38	13	12	13	40	41	−1	76	
12	OFI	38	13	11	14	44	41	+3	75	
13	Koropi	38	13	11	14	36	38	−2	75	
14	Chania	38	14	10	14	50	53	−3	75 (Note: Chania had 1 point deducted.)	
15	Panelefsiniakos	38	13	10	15	41	42	−1	74	
16	Kerkyra	38	13	8	17	49	62	−13	72	
17	Paniliakos	38	9	12	17	24	40	−16	68	
18	Asteras Amaliada (R)	38	7	12	19	36	70	−34	64	Relegation to C National Amateur Division
19	Pannemeatikos Nemea (R)	38	4	12	22	36	81	−45	58	Relegation to C National Amateur Division
20	Ethnikos Asteras (R)	38	5	4	29	28	86	−58	51 (Note: ?1 point deducted?)	Relegation to C National Amateur Division

(C) Champions; (P) Promoted; (R) Relegated

== Group 2 ==
=== League table ===
Pos	Team	Pld	W	D	L	GF	GA	GD	Pts	Promotion or relegation
1	AEL (C, P)	38	27	6	5	68	19	+49	98	Promotion to Alpha Ethniki
2	Anagennisi Karditsa	38	19	13	6	44	22	+22	89	
3	Chalkida	38	19	13	6	49	32	+17	89	
4	Atromitos Piraeus	38	14	17	7	41	31	+10	83	
5	Proodeftiki	38	15	14	9	40	26	+14	82 (Note: ?6 or 0 points deducted?)	
6	Kallithea	38	12	16	10	44	35	+9	78	
7	Vyzas	38	16	7	15	44	29	+15	77	
8	Panaspropyrgiakos	38	16	7	15	34	31	+3	77	
9	Levadiakos	38	13	11	14	41	34	+7	75	
10	AO Karditsa	38	12	13	13	44	39	+5	75	
11	Rodos	38	14	9	15	42	43	−1	75	
12	Phoebus Kremasti	38	13	10	15	41	63	−22	74	
13	Ilisiakos	38	10	15	13	26	38	−12	73	
14	Niki Volos	38	13	9	16	47	63	−16	73	
15	AO Petralona	38	11	12	15	33	38	−5	72	
16	Argonaftis Piraeus	38	11	12	15	33	46	−13	72	
17	Ikaros Athens	38	11	11	16	34	38	−4	71	
18	AFC Patra (R)	38	12	8	18	35	46	−11	70	Relegation to C National Amateur Division
19	Orfeas Egaleo (R)	38	9	10	19	39	54	−15	65 (Note: Orfeas Egaleo had 1 point deducted.)	Relegation to C National Amateur Division
20	Thiva (R)	38	4	5	29	24	76	−52	51	Relegation to C National Amateur Division

(C) Champions; (P) Promoted; (R) Relegated

== Group 3 ==
=== League table ===
Pos	Team	Pld	W	D	L	GF	GA	GD	Pts	Promotion or relegation
1	Apollon Kalamarias (C, P)	38	22	12	4	41	12	+29	94	Promotion to Alpha Ethniki
2	Kastoria	38	20	10	8	49	24	+25	88	
3	Naoussa	38	19	9	10	53	37	+16	85	
4	Pierikos	38	15	15	8	49	32	+17	83	
5	Doxa Drama	38	16	9	13	58	37	+21	79	
6	Pandramaikos	38	14	13	11	32	26	+6	79	
7	Veria	38	15	10	13	42	31	+11	78	
8	Anagennisi Epanomi	38	16	8	14	44	47	−3	78	
9	Panthrakikos	38	14	10	14	34	31	+3	76	
10	Anagennisi Giannitsa	38	14	10	14	34	40	−6	76	
11	Xanthi	38	12	13	13	39	35	+4	75	
12	Moudania	38	12	13	13	32	31	+1	75	
13	Makedonikos	38	13	11	14	38	33	+5	74 (Note: Makedonikos had 1 point deducted.)	
14	Almopos Aridea	38	13	10	15	33	38	−5	74	
15	Kilkisiakos	38	12	11	15	31	36	−5	73	
16	Edessaikos	38	13	9	16	31	38	−7	73	
17	Foinikas Polichni	38	13	9	16	37	46	−9	73	
18	Pyrsos Grevena (R)	38	10	13	15	33	44	−11	71	Relegation to C National Amateur Division
19	Apollon Krya Vrysi (R)	38	11	9	18	38	47	−9	69	Relegation to C National Amateur Division
20	AE Florina (R)	38	2	4	32	13	96	−83	40 (Note: ?2 or 6 points deducted?)	Relegation to C National Amateur Division

(C) Champions; (P) Promoted; (R) Relegated
