= Petros Routzieris =

Greek footballer

Personal information
- Date of birth: 4 January 1973 (age 53)
- Place of birth: Rhodes, Greece
- Height: 1.85 m (6 ft 1 in)
- Position: Defender

Senior career*
Years	Team	Apps	(Gls)
–1996	Proodeftiki		
1996–1998	Athinaikos		
1999–2001	Proodeftiki		
2001–2002	Chalkidona		
2002–2007	Diagoras		

Managerial career
- 2009: Diagoras (caretaker)
- 2010–2011: Diagoras
- 2018–2019: Diagoras
- 2019: Diagoras (technical director)
- 2019–2020: Diagoras
- 2021–2022: Ialysos
- 2024: Apollon Kalythies
- 2025: Diagoras
- * Club domestic league appearances and goals

Petros Routzieris (Greek: Πέτρος Ρουτζιέρης; born 4 January 1973) is a Greek professional football manager and former player.
