= 1973–74 Alpha Ethniki =

38th season of top-tier football league in Greece

Alpha Ethniki
- Season: 1973–74
- Champions: Olympiacos; 19th Greek title
- Relegated: Fostiras; Apollon Athens; Apollon Kalamarias
- European Cup: Olympiacos
- UEFA Cup: Panathinaikos; Aris
- Cup Winners' Cup: PAOK
- Matches: 306
- Goals: 760 (2.48 per match)
- Top goalscorer: Antonis Antoniadis (26 goals)

The 1973–74 Alpha Ethniki was the 38th season of the highest football league of Greece. The season began on 23 September 1973 and ended on 22 June 1974. Olympiacos won their second consecutive and 19th Greek title. That was the last season in which Cypriot teams took part, while this season a new 2-1-0 point system was introduced, replacing the corresponding 3–2–1.

The point system was: Win: 2 points - Draw: 1 point - Loss: 0 points.

== Teams ==
Promoted from 1972–73 Beta Ethniki	Relegated from 1972–73 Alpha Ethniki
Apollon Athens; AEL; Apollon Kalamarias	Kalamata; Atromitos; Trikala; Omonia
Promoted from 1972–73 Cypriot First Division	Kalamata; Atromitos; Trikala; Omonia
APOEL	Kalamata; Atromitos; Trikala; Omonia

Location of teams in 1973–74 Alpha Ethniki

== League table ==
Pos	Team	Pld	W	D	L	GF	GA	GD	Pts	Qualification or relegation
1	Olympiacos (C)	34	26	7	1	102	14	+88	59	Qualification for European Cup first round
2	Panathinaikos	34	24	6	4	76	27	+49	54	Qualification for UEFA Cup first round
3	Aris	34	21	6	7	49	29	+20	48	Qualification for UEFA Cup first round
4	PAOK	34	16	11	7	62	32	+30	43	Qualification for Cup Winners' Cup first round
5	AEK Athens	34	16	8	10	53	36	+17	40	
6	Panachaiki	34	13	12	9	42	37	+5	38	
7	Iraklis	34	10	13	11	40	37	+3	33	
8	Panionios	34	13	7	14	41	44	−3	33	
9	AEL	34	11	10	13	31	40	−9	32	
10	Ethnikos Piraeus	34	11	9	14	38	42	−4	31	
11	Egaleo	34	11	7	16	28	44	−16	29	
12	Kavala	34	11	6	17	32	44	−12	28	
13	APOEL (Note: APOEL qualified to remain in the league, but were later withdrawn from the Greek league due to the Turkish invasion of Cyprus.) (W)	34	11	5	18	39	48	−9	27 (Note: 13th–15th place play-off: Panserraikos–Olympiacos Volos 1–0, APOEL–Panserraikos 5–1, APOEL–Olympiacos Volos 1–2.)	Moving to Cypriot First Division
14	Panserraikos	34	11	5	18	28	54	−26	27	
15	Olympiacos Volos	34	9	9	16	28	44	−16	27	
16	Fostiras (R)	34	7	9	18	24	63	−39	23	Relegation to Beta Ethniki
17	Apollon Athens (R)	34	7	8	19	30	66	−36	22	Relegation to Beta Ethniki
18	Apollon Kalamarias (R)	34	5	8	21	17	59	−42	18	Relegation to Beta Ethniki

Source: RSSSF
Rules for classification: 1st points; 2nd decision match; 3rd head-to-head goal difference.
(C) Champions; (R) Relegated; (W) ?

== Results ==
Home \ Away	AEK	AEL	APO	APA	APK	ARIS	EGA	ETH	FOS	IRA	KAV	OLY	OLV	PNC	PAO	PAN	PNS	PAOK
AEK Athens		1–0	3–1	4–1	4–1	1–1	4–0	3–1	2–0	1–2	1–0	0–0	3–1	1–1	0–2	4–1	3–0	0–0
AEL	2–1		1–0	3–1	2–0	2–1	1–0	1–0	1–0	1–1	0–0	0–3	2–0	1–0	2–2	1–3	1–1	1–1
APOEL	2–1	0–0		2–1	2–0	0–1	1–0	1–0	5–1	2–1	4–1	0–1	2–0	0–2	2–2	4–1	2–1	2–3
Apollon Athens	0–1	0–1	2–1		2–0	2–4	1–0	1–1	0–0	0–0	1–1	0–4	2–0	0–0	0–1	2–6	3–0	0–1
Apollon Kalamarias	1–0	1–1	0–0	0–0		0–0	0–0	0–2	1–1	1–0	0–1	2–3	1–0	1–1	0–2	1–0	1–0	1–2
Aris	1–0	2–0	1–0	4–1	2–1		2–0	2–1	3–0	1–0	1–0	2–4	0–0	3–0	0–2	3–1	4–2	1–0
Egaleo	2–3	0–0	1–0	0–0	3–0	1–1		2–1	0–0	1–0	1–0	0–6	0–1	1–1	1–2	2–0	1–0	3–1
Ethnikos Piraeus	1–2	1–1	1–0	1–0	4–1	0–0	2–2		4–0	2–1	3–2	1–1	3–0	1–1	0–2	0–2	0–0	0–0
Fostiras	1–4	3–1	2–0	1–0	2–0	0–2	1–0	1–2		1–0	0–0	1–1	0–0	1–1	2–3	0–0	2–1	1–1
Iraklis	1–1	6–1	3–1	4–2	2–2	0–1	0–1	0–0	3–1		1–0	0–0	3–2	1–0	1–1	1–1	2–1	1–1
Kavala	1–1	1–0	2–1	1–2	2–0	0–1	1–2	2–0	1–0	1–1		0–2	4–0	2–2	1–0	2–1	1–0	1–0
Olympiacos	4–0	2–1	3–0	8–2	5–1	4–0	5–0	2–1	11–0	3–0	4–0		3–0	3–0	1–1	2–0	6–0	3–0
Olympiacos Volos	2–1	0–0	3–1	1–1	2–0	0–0	0–1	2–0	2–0	1–1	3–1	0–2		0–1	1–0	1–0	1–1	2–2
Panachaiki	1–1	1–0	2–1	2–0	1–0	2–0	3–2	1–2	2–0	2–2	4–2	0–3	2–0		2–3	1–0	3–0	1–1
Panathinaikos	1–0	2–1	3–0	5–0	5–0	3–1	2–0	3–0	4–1	2–0	3–1	1–1	2–1	2–0		6–2	4–0	3–2
Panionios	1–1	1–0	1–1	2–3	1–0	2–0	1–0	0–1	2–0	0–0	2–0	0–0	3–1	2–1	1–0		2–0	1–1
Panserraikos	0–1	2–1	0–0	3–0	2–0	0–3	1–0	3–1	2–1	1–0	1–0	0–2	1–0	0–0	2–1	2–1		1–4
PAOK	3–0	3–1	4–1	4–0	5–0	0–1	3–1	3–1	4–0	1–2	2–0	1–0	1–1	1–1	1–1	3–0	3–0	

Source: RSSSF
Legend: Blue = home team win; Yellow = draw; Red = away team win.

== Top scorers ==
Rank	Player	Club	Goals
1	(Greece) Antonis Antoniadis	Panathinaikos	26
2	(France) Yves Triantafyllos	Olympiacos	23
3	(Greece) Michalis Kritikopoulos	Olympiacos	19
4	(Greece) Alekos Alexiadis	Aris	17
5	(Greece) Achilleas Aslanidis	PAOK	15
6	(Cyprus) Tasos Konstantinou	AEK Athens	14
7	(Greece) Stamatis Vourdamis	Panionios	12
7	(Greece) Stavros Sarafis	PAOK	12
7	(Greece) Dimitris Gesios	Iraklis	12
7	(Greece) Vasilis Karaiskos	Olympiacos Volos	12

== Attendances ==
Olympiacos drew the highest average home attendance in the 1973–74 Alpha Ethniki.

#	Team	Average attendance
1	Olympiacos	29,526
2	PAOK	19,681
3	AEK Athens	17,837
4	Panathinaikos	17,649
5	Iraklis	10,655
6	Aris	10,624
7	AEL	8,177
8	Ethnikos Piraeus	7,657
9	Panachaiki	7,212
10	Panionios	6,989
11	Olympiacos Volos	5,195
12	Egaleo	5,070
13	APOEL	5,002
14	Kavala	4,975
15	Apollon Athens	4,676
16	Panserraikos	4,027
17	Apollon Kalamarias	3,963
18	Fostiras	3,623
