= 1933 Greek Football Cup final =

1933 Greek Cup final
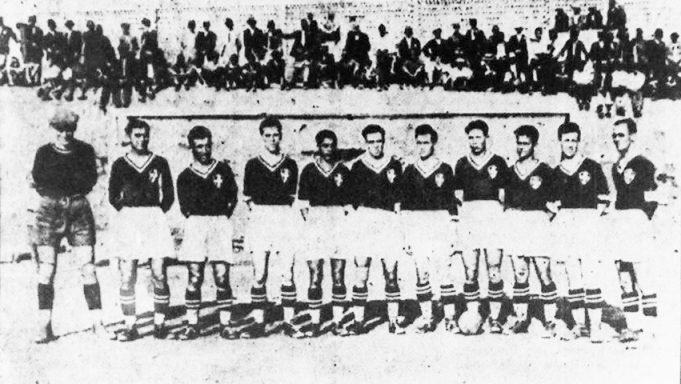
- Ethnikos Piraeus' squad
- Event: 1932–33 Greek Football Cup
Aris	Ethnikos Piraeus
- Ethnikos Piraeus won after a replay
Aris	Ethnikos Piraeus
2	2
- After extra time
- Date: 5 February 1933
- Venue: Aris Stadium, Thessaloniki
- Referee: Takis Douskas
- Attendance: 7,000

Replay
Ethnikos Piraeus	Aris
2	1
- Date: 25 March 1933
- Venue: Leoforos Alexandras Stadium, Ampelokipoi, Athens
- Referee: Kostas Oikonomopoulos (Athens)

The 1933 Greek Cup final was the 2nd final of the Greek Cup. The initial match took place on 5 February 1933 at Aris Stadium. The replay match took place on 25 March 1933 at Leoforos Alexandras Stadium. The contesting teams were Aris and Ethnikos Piraeus. It was Aris' second Greek Cup final in their 19 years of existence and Ethnikos Piraeus' first ever Greek Cup final in their 10-year history. The HFF, intending for maximum incomes, initially scheduled the match at Leoforos Alexandras Stadium, which was the largest stadium of the country at the time, but Aris requested for the match to be played at their home ground, as the proclamation dictated. Eventually a draw for the venue of the match took place, which selected Aris Stadium. After the end of the tournament, the HFF temporarily suspended the institution "until it became possible to get it better organized".

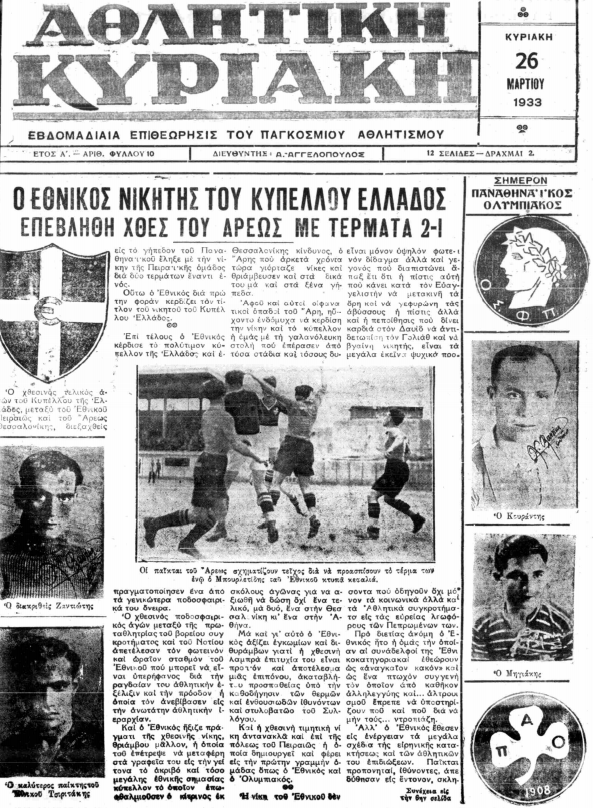
A highlight of the final

== Venue ==
This was the first Greek Cup final held at Aris Stadium.

Aris Stadium was built in 1914. The stadium is used as a venue for Aris. Its current capacity is 7,000.

== Background ==
Aris had reached the Greek Cup final once in 1932, where they had lost AEK Athens by 5–3.

Ethnikos Piraeus had never competed in a Cup final.

The two teams had never met each other in a Cup final.

== Route to the final ==
Aris				Round	Ethnikos Piraeus			
Opponent	Agg.	1st leg	2nd leg		Opponent	Agg.	1st leg	2nd leg
AEK Athens	2–1	1–1 (a.e.t.) (A)	1–0 (H)	Second round	Thermaikos	3–0 (H)		
Apollon Athens	2–1 (H)			Quarter-finals	bye			
Olympiacos	2–1 (H)			Semi-finals	Iraklis	3–1 (A)		

== Match ==
=== Details ===
5 February 1933

Aris	2–2 (a.e.t.)	Ethnikos Piraeus
Angelakis 25'; Kitsos 65'	Report	Tsiritakis 30'; Deligiorgis 47'

Aris Stadium, Thessaloniki
Attendance: 7,000
Referee: Takis Douskas

GK	(Greece) Kostas Koumplis
DF	(Greece) Kostas Vikelidis (c)
DF	(Greece) Charalambos Paschalidis
MF	(Greece) Panagiotis Katsaounis
MF	(Greece) Daniil Danelian
MF	(Greece) Nikiforos Vikelidis
FW	(Greece) Iordanis Vogdanou
FW	(Greece) Nikolaos Angelakis
FW	(Greece) Nikos Kitsos
FW	(Greece) Dionysis Kaltekis
FW	(Greece) Argyris Argyriadis
Manager:
(Hungary) Gyula Antal

GK	(Greece) Zantiotis
DF	(Greece) Dimitris Zourdos
DF	(Greece) Konstantoudakis
MF	(Greece) Frangakis
MF	(Greece) Vangelis Chelmis
MF	(Greece) Giannis Chelmis
FW	(Greece) Deligiorgis
FW	(Greece) I. Tsiritakis
FW	(Greece) Nikos Tsiritakis
FW	(Greece) Bourletidis
FW	(Greece) Petroutsos
Manager:
(Czech Republic) Jan Kopřiva

Match rules

- 90 minutes
- 30 minutes of extra time if necessary
- Replay match if scores still level

== Replay ==
=== Details ===
25 March 1933
16:00 EET

Ethnikos Piraeus	2–1	Aris
Tsiritakis 54' (pen.); Alexopoulos 55'	Report	Kaltekis 48'

Leoforos Alexandras Stadium, Athens
Referee: Kostas Oikonomopoulos (Athens)

GK	(Greece) Zantiotis
DF	(Greece) Dimitris Zourdos
DF	(Greece) Konstantoudakis
MF	(Greece) Giannis Chelmis
MF	(Greece) I. Tsiritakis
MF	(Greece) Vangelis Chelmis
FW	(Greece) Deligiorgis
FW	(Greece) Alexopoulos
FW	(Greece) P. Tsiritakis
FW	(Greece) Bourletidis
FW	(Greece) Lapatos
Manager:
(Czech Republic) Jan Kopřiva

GK	(Greece) Kostas Koumplis
DF	(Greece) Kostas Vikelidis (c)
DF	(Greece) Kostas Gikopoulos
MF	(Greece) Panagiotis Katsaounis
MF	(Greece) Nikiforos Vikelidis
MF	(Greece) Iordanis Vogdanou
FW	(Greece) Romilios Yetion
FW	(Greece) Nikos Kitsos
FW	(Greece) Paschalidis
FW	(Greece) Dionysis Kaltekis
FW	(Greece) Argyris Argyriadis
Manager:
(Hungary) Gyula Antal

Match rules

- 90 minutes
- 30 minutes of extra time if necessary
- Coin toss if scores still level

== See also ==
- 1932–33 Greek Football Cup
