= Dodecanese Football Clubs Association =

Association football governing body in Dodecanese Prefecture, Greece

- Full name: Dodecanese Football Clubs Association; Greek: Ένωση Ποδοσφαιρικών Σωματείων Δωδεκανήσου
- Short name: Dodecanese F.C.A.; Greek: Ε.Π.Σ. Δωδεκανήσου
- Founded: 1947; 79 years ago
- Headquarters: Rhodes, Greece
- FIFA affiliation: Hellenic Football Federation
- President: Panagiotis Diakofotis
- Website: epsdod.gr

Dodecanese Football Clubs Association (Greek: Ένωση Ποδοσφαιρικών Σωματείων Δωδεκανήσου) is the organization that is responsible for football in the prefecture of Dodecanese in Greece. In the jurisdiction of E.P.S. Dodecanese are clubs from the islands of Rhodes, Kos, Patmos, Karpathos, Leipsoi, Leros, Kalymnos, Astypalaia, Nisyros, Tilos, Halki, Simi, Kasos and Kastellorizo. Its offices are housed in Rhodes and it is a member of the HFF. It is responsible for running the local league and cup, as well as the youth and children's divisions. It also coordinates the activities of the mixed youth and children's groups, which represent the county at national level.

== History ==
It was founded in 1947, two years after the liberation of the Dodecanese and their integration into Greece, it took over the organization of the championship that previously existed from 1932 to 1933 and was organized by the Rhodian Federation of Tourism, Leisure and Sports Associations that had been founded by the Italian authorities and was recognized by the respective Italian federations. Founding members are the unions Dorieas, Diagoras, Ialysos and Phoebus Kremasti, with Gavriil Misios, founder of Dorieas and later of ARS, as its first president.

== League ==
=== Organization ===
The structure of the leagues of the Dodecanese FCA is as follows:

- First Division
- Second Division (3 Groups)
- Third Division

=== Champions ===
Season	Winners
1947–48	Diagoras
1948–49	Diagoras
1949–50	Diagoras
1950–51	Diagoras
1951–52	Diagoras
1952–53	Diagoras
1953–54	Diagoras
1954–55	Diagoras
1955–56	Diagoras
1956–57	Diagoras
1957–58	Diagoras
1958–59	Diagoras
1959–60	A.E.P. Rodos
1960–61	Diagoras
1961–62	Rodiakos
1962–63	Dorieas
1963–64	Phoebus Kremasti
1964–65	Ialysos
1965–66	Rodiakos
1966–67	Phoebus Kremasti
1967–68	Dorieas
1968–69	Antagoras Kos
1969–70	Digenis Koskinou
1970–71	Phoebus Kremasti
1971–72	Phoebus Kremasti
1972–73	Antagoras Kos
1973–74	Diagoras
1974–75	AER Afantou
1975–76	Phoebus Kremasti
1976–77	Antagoras Kos
1977–78	Diagoras
1978–79	Phoebus Kremasti
1979–80	Apollon Kalythies
1980–81	Antagoras Kos
1981–82	Ialysos
1982–83	Apollon Kalythies
1983–84	Dorieas
1984–85	Apollon Kalythies
1985–86	Kalymniakos
1986–87	Phoebus Kremasti
1987–88	A.E. Kos
1988–89	Kalymniakos
1989–90	Apollon Kalythies
1990–91	Diagoras Vati
1991–92	Kalymniakos
1992–93	Aris Archangelos
1993–94	Digenis Koskinou
1994–95	Aris Archangelos
1995–96	Phoebus Kremasti
1996–97	A.E. Kos
1997–98	Iraklis Maritsa
1998–99	Apollon Kalythies
1999–2000	A.E. Kos
2000–01	Rodos
2001–02	Diagoras
2002–03	Digenis Koskinou
2003–04	Ialysos
2004–05	AER Afantou
2005–06	Kleanthis Paradisi Rodos
2006–07	AER Afantou
2007–08	Diagoras Vati
2008–09	Ialysos
2009–10	Antagoras Kos
2010–11	A.E. Kos
2011–12	A.O. Dikaio Kos
2012–13	Phoebus Kremasti
2013–14	Ialysos
2014–15	Ialysos
2015–16	Rodos
2016–17	Diagoras
2017–18	Phoebus Kremasti
2018–19	Rodos
2019–20	A.O. Pyli Kos
2020–21	Suspended
2021–22	Ialysos
2022–23	AER Afantou
2023–24	Phoebus Kremasti
2024–25	Apollon Kalythies
2025–26	Ialysos

=== Titles ===
Club	Winner	Seasons
Diagoras	17	1948, 1949, 1950, 1951, 1952, 1953, 1954, 1955, 1956, 1957, 1958, 1959, 1961, 1974, 1978, 2002, 2017
Phoebus Kremasti	11	1964, 1967, 1971, 1972, 1976, 1979, 1987, 1996, 2013, 2018, 2024
Ialysos	8	1965, 1982, 2004, 2009, 2014, 2015, 2022, 2026
Apollon Kalythies	6	1980, 1983, 1985, 1990, 1999, 2025
Antagoras Kos	5	1969, 1973, 1977, 1981, 2010
AER Afantou	4	1975, 2005, 2007, 2023
A.E. Kos	4	1988, 1997, 2000, 2011
Digenis Koskinou	3	1970, 1994, 2003
Kalymniakos	3	1986, 1989, 1992
Rodos	3	2001, 2016, 2019
Rodiakos	2	1962, 1966
Dorieas	2	1963, 1984
Diagoras Vati	2	1991, 2008
Aris Archangelos	2	1993, 1995
A.O. Dikaio Kos/A.O. Pyli Kos	2	2012, 2020
A.E.P. Rodos	1	1960
Iraklis Maritsa	1	1998
Kleanthis Paradisi Rodos	1	2006

== Cup ==
The Dodecanese FCA Cup was instituted in the 1971–72 season. Until the 1970-71 season, the Dodecanese FCA as well as the other Local football championships of Greece participated in the organization of the Greek Cup. From the 1971–72 season, the local FCA’s amateur cups and the Greek Amateur Cup were established, where and participate the clubs that compete in the local amateur championships of the FCAs, the clubs that compete in the respective national amateur championships and the amateur teams of the clubs that compete in the national professional championships.

From the 1971–72 season up to and including the 2017–18 season, the local cup winners of the FCA qualified for the Greek Amateur Cup, while from the 2018–19 season to the 2020–21 season and from the 2022–23 season they qualify for the next season's Greek Cup.

=== Winners ===
Season	Winners
1971–72	Phoebus Kremasti
1972–73	Digenis Koskinou
1973–74	Diagoras
1974–75	Anagennisi Emponas
1975–76	Aris Archangelos
1976–77	Antagoras Kos
1977–78	Ialysos
1978–79	Phoebus Kremasti
1979–80	Apollon Kalythies
1980–81	Kleanthis Paradisi Rodos
1981–82	Dorieas
1982–83	Aris Archangelos
1983–84	Phoebus Kremasti
1984–85	Akousilaos Fanes
1985–86	Rodiakos
1986–87	Phoebus Kremasti
1987–88	Phoebus Kremasti
1988–89	Akousilaos Fanes
1989–90	A.E. Kos
1990–91	Rodos
1991–92	Diagoras Vati
1992–93	A.E. Kos
1993–94	Phoebus Kremasti
1994–95	Rodos-Diagoras Union
1995–96	Aris Archangelos
1996–97	Aris Archangelos
1997–98	A.S. Agios Georgios Malona
1998–99	A.S. Agios Georgios Malona
1999–2000	A.E. Kos
2000–01	Apollon Kalythies
2001–02	Digenis Koskinou
2002–03	Apollon Kalythies
2003–04	Diagoras
2004–05	Antagoras Kos
2005–06	A.E. Kos
2006–07	Aris Archangelos
2007–08	Antagoras Kos
2008–09	Ermis Kalythies
2009–10	Anagennisi Nisos Rodos
2010–11	Anagennisi/Ialysos
2011–12	Aris Archangelos
2012–13	Phoebus Kremasti
2013–14	Phoebus Kremasti
2014–15	Ialysos
2015–16	Ialysos
2016–17	Diagoras
2017–18	A.E. Dikaios-Antimachos Kos
2018–19	Diagoras
2019–20	Aris Archangelos
2020–21	Suspended
2021–22	AER Afantou
2022–23	Ialysos
2023–24	AER Afantou
2024–25	Apollon Kalythies
2025–26	Phoebus Kremasti

Source: news12.gr

=== Finals ===
Season	Winner	Result	Runner-up
1971–72	Phoebus Kremasti	2–0 (w/o)	Antagoras Kos
1972–73	Digenis Koskinou	2–1	Apollon Kalythies
1973–74	Diagoras	6–0	Digenis Koskinou
1974–75	Anagennisi Emponas	1–1 (4–2 p)	AER Afantou
1975–76	Aris Archangelos	1–0	Antagoras Kos
1976–77	Antagoras Kos	1–1 (6–4 p)	Anagennisi Emponas
1977–78	Ialysos	2–1	Aris Archangelos
1978–79	Phoebus Kremasti	0–0 (5–4 p)	Diagoras
1979–80	Apollon Kalythies	1–0	Phoebus Kremasti
1980–81	Kleanthis Paradisi	1–1 (4–2 p)	Phoebus Kremasti
1981–82	Dorieas	3–1	AER Afantou
1982–83	Aris Archangelos	2–1	Ialysos
1983–84	Phoebus Kremasti	1–1 (4–3 p)	Antagoras Kos
1984–85	Akousilaos Fanes	1–0	Kleanthis Paradisi
1985–86	Rodiakos	1–0	AER Afantou
1986–87	Phoebus Kremasti	3–1	A.E. Kos
1987–88	Phoebus Kremasti	1–0	A.E. Kattavia
1988–89	Akousilaos Fanes	3–1	Kalymniakos
1989–90	A.E. Kos	3–0	Phoebus Kremasti
1990–91	Rodos	3–0	Phoebus Kremasti
1991–92	Diagoras Vati	2–0	A.E. Kos
1992–93	A.E. Kos	3–3 (4–3 p)	Ialysos
1993–94	Phoebus Kremasti	1–1 (2–1 p)	Diagoras
1994–95	Rodos-Diagoras Union	2–0	Diagoras Vati
1995–96	Aris Archangelos	1–0	Digenis Koskinou
1996–97	Aris Archangelos	1–0	Phoebus Kremasti
1997–98	A.S. Agios Georgios Malona	2–1	Phoebus Kremasti
1998–99	A.S. Agios Georgios Malona	0–0 (4–3 p)	Apollon Kalythies
1999–2000	A.E. Kos	3–0	Aspida Salakos
2000–01	Apollon Kalythies	2–0	A.E. Kos
2001–02	Digenis Koskinou	0–0 (4–3 p)	A.E. Kos
2002–03	Apollon Kalythies	1–0	A.E. Kos
2003–04	Diagoras	0–0 (4–2 p)	A.E. Kos
2004–05	Antagoras Kos	1–0	Kleanthis Paradisi
2005–06	A.E. Kos	2–1	AER Afantou
2006–07	Aris Archangelos	0–0 (4–3 p)	Ialysos
2007–08	Antagoras Kos	3–2 (a.e.t.)	AER Afantou
2008–09	Ermis Kalythies	1-0 (a.e.t.)	Kleanthis Paradisi
2009–10	Anagennisi Nisos Rodos	5–2	A.E. Kos
2010–11	Anagennisi/Ialysos	2–1	A.O. Dikaio Kos
2011–12	Aris Archangelos	0–0 (7–6 p)	A.O. Dikaio Kos
2012–13	Phoebus Kremasti	1–0	Apollon Kalythies
2013–14	Phoebus Kremasti	2–0	Iraklis Maritsa
2014–15	Ialysos	2–0	Rodos
2015–16	Ialysos	1–1 (6–5 p)	Diagoras
2016–17	Diagoras	1–0	Aris Archangelos
2017–18	A.E. Dikaios-Antimachos Kos	4–0	Doxa Kardamena
2018–19	Diagoras	2–0	Apollon Kalythies
2019–20	Aris Archangelos	After draw	
2020–21	Suspended due to the COVID-19 pandemic		
2021–22	AER Afantou	2–1	Phoebus Kremasti
2022–23	Ialysos	2–2 (4–3 p)	AER Afantou
2023–24	AER Afantou	1–0	Ialysos
2024–25	Apollon Kalythies	4–0	Doxa Kardamena
2025–26	Phoebus Kremasti	2–0	Euclis Soroni

=== Performance by club ===
Club	Titles	Season
Phoebus Kremasti	9	1972, 1979, 1984, 1987, 1988, 1994, 2013, 2014, 2026
Aris Archangelos	7	1976, 1983, 1996, 1997, 2007, 2012, 2020
Ialysos	5	1978, 2011, 2015, 2016, 2023
Diagoras	4	1974, 2004, 2017, 2019
A.E. Kos	4	1990, 1993, 2000, 2006
Apollon Kalythies	4	1980, 2001, 2003, 2025
Antagoras Kos	3	1977, 2005, 2008
Akousilaos Fanes	2	1985, 1989
Rodos	2	1991, 1995
A.S. Agios Georgios Malona	2	1998, 1999
Digenis Koskinou	2	1973, 2002
AER Afantou	2	2022, 2024
Anagennisi Emponas	1	1975
Kleanthis Paradisi Rodos	1	1981
Dorieas	1	1982
Rodiakos	1	1986
Diagoras Vati	1	1992
Ermis Kalythies	1	2009
Anagennisi Nisos Rodos	1	2010
A.E. Dikaios-Antimachos Kos	1	2018

== Super Cup ==
The Dodecanese Super Cup "Georgios Tsopanakis" is a football match between the champion and the cup winner of the previous season. It is dedicated to the memory of the former Dodecanese Football Clubs Association president.

=== Finals ===
Season	Winner	Runner-up	Result
2010	Antagoras Kos	Anagennisi/Ialysos	1–1 (4–1 p)
2011	Anagennisi/Ialysos	A.E. Kos	4–0
2012	Aris Archangelos	A.O. Dikaio Kos	2–0
2014	Ialysos	Phoebus Kremasti	1–0
2018	Phoebus Kremasti	A.E. DI.AS	Suspended
2019	Diagoras	Rodos	2–0
2022	AER Afantou	Ialysos	2–1

== Sources ==
- Athletic Almanak of Dodecanese 1945–1960, Georgios M. Sentakis, Rhodes 2006, ISBN 9606310876
