= Gabriel Misios =

- Γαβριήλ Μίσιος
- Born: 1902; Symi, Ottoman Empire
- Died: 1968 (aged 65–66); Rhodes, Greece
- Occupations: Sports administrator, community leader, journalist
- Years active: 1924–1968
- Known for: Founder of Dodecanesian Athletic and Nautical Club Dorieas; First president of the Dodecanese Football Clubs Association
- Spouse: Alkmini Nikolaou
- Children: 6

Gabriel Misios (Greek: Γαβριήλ Μίσιος; 1902–1968) was a Greek sports administrator, community leader, journalist, and resistance figure on the island of Rhodes during the Italian occupation of the Dodecanese and the subsequent German control during the Second World War.

Misios founded the Dodecanesian Athletic and Nautical Club Dorieas (Δ.Α.Ν.Σ. Δωριεύς) in 1924, the first organised football and multi-sport club in the Dodecanese, and through it built much of the region's athletic infrastructure. He used sport as a form of cultural resistance under Fascist rule, instilling patriotism among Rhodian youth and preserving Greek identity. His activities led to his arrest and exile during the war for fostering Greek national sentiment. After liberation, he remained active in sports administration, journalism, and public service.

== Early life and education ==
Misios was born on the island of Symi in 1902. He enlisted in the Hellenic Navy, serving aboard the armoured cruiser Elli before the Asia Minor Catastrophe of 1922. After his discharge from the navy, he settled in the city of Rhodes, then under Italian rule, and became known as an organiser, sportsman, and writer.

== Career ==
In August 1924, during Italian rule, Misios founded Dans Dorieas (named after Dorieus of Rhodes, the son of the ancient Olympic victor Diagoras of Rhodes) and became its first president at the age of 22. He expanded the club beyond football to basketball, athletics, cycling, boxing, rowing and sailing, making it a centre of social life in Rhodes. Following incidents during the 1929 Mayor's Cup race between Dorieas and rival club Diagoras, the Italian authorities ordered the dissolution of Greek clubs in the Dodecanese. In response, in 1931 Misios founded the clandestine Athletic Rhodian Club (Αθλητικός Ροδιακός Σύλλογος, ΑΡΣ) to continue sporting activities for Greek athletes left without a club. Further Fascist decrees in 1934–35, issued under Cesare Maria De Vecchi who succeeded Lago as governor, suspended Dorieas and Diagoras by police order and replaced them with four ethnically segregated teams.

During World War II, Italian authorities arrested him for nationalist activity and exiled him to the island of Tilos, where he remained from 1940 to 1942. After liberation, he re‑established Dorieas, which later reached the Greek Second Division In 1947, helped found the Dodecanese Football Clubs Association (ΕΠΣΔ) and served as its first president. That same year, he was appointed General Secretary of the Municipality of Rhodes and witnessed the Greek flag‑raising ceremony of 31 March 1947.

During the Cyprus Emergency, Misios returned a ceremonial flag of HMS London to the British consul (22 March 1956) in protest of British policy.

From the late 1940s to the 1960s, Misios wrote extensively for local newspapers, documenting Dodecanesian social history.

== Personal life ==
Misios was married and had six children. His son George Misios contributed to the design of Dorieus' symbols.

== Awards and honours ==
- Honorary president of the Dodecanese Football Clubs Association (1947).
- The Municipality of Rhodes named Odós Gavriil Misiou in his honour.

== See also ==
- Dodecanese campaign
