= 1970–71 Alpha Ethniki =

35th season of top-tier football league in Greece

Alpha Ethniki
- Season: 1970–71
- Champions: AEK Athens; 5th Greek title
- Relegated: Panserraikos; Proodeftiki; OFI; EPA Larnaca
- European Cup: AEK Athens
- UEFA Cup: Panionios
- Cup Winners' Cup: Olympiacos
- Matches: 306
- Goals: 690 (2.25 per match)
- Top goalscorer: Georgios Dedes (28 goals)

The 1970–71 Alpha Ethniki was the 35th season of the highest football league of Greece. The season began on 20 September 1970 and ended on 13 June 1971. AEK Athens won their fifth Greek title and their first one in three years.

The point system was: Win: 3 points - Draw: 2 points - Loss: 1 point.

== Teams ==
Promoted from 1969–70 Beta Ethniki	Relegated from 1969–70 Alpha Ethniki
Apollon Athens; Fostiras; Veria	Vyzas Megara; Olympiacos Volos; Olympiakos Nicosia; Panachaiki
Promoted from 1969–70 Cypriot First Division	Vyzas Megara; Olympiacos Volos; Olympiakos Nicosia; Panachaiki
EPA Larnaca	Vyzas Megara; Olympiacos Volos; Olympiakos Nicosia; Panachaiki

Location of teams in 1970–71 Alpha Ethniki

== League table ==
Pos	Team	Pld	W	D	L	GF	GA	GD	Pts	Qualification or relegation
1	AEK Athens (C)	34	23	8	3	67	18	+49	88	Qualification for European Cup first round
2	Panionios	34	21	7	6	61	34	+27	83	Qualification for UEFA Cup first round
3	Panathinaikos	34	19	10	5	62	26	+36	82	
4	Egaleo	34	15	11	8	31	24	+7	75	
5	Iraklis	34	13	15	6	40	30	+10	75	
6	Apollon Athens	34	12	13	9	30	27	+3	71	
7	Olympiacos	34	13	11	10	44	24	+20	71	Qualification for Cup Winners' Cup first round
8	PAOK	34	12	10	12	38	32	+6	68	
9	Ethnikos Piraeus	34	10	14	10	45	37	+8	68	
10	Aris	34	10	13	11	45	39	+6	67	
11	Kavala	34	10	11	13	25	35	−10	65	
12	Fostiras	34	8	14	12	31	47	−16	64	
13	Veria	34	9	12	13	28	47	−19	64	
14	Pierikos	34	8	14	12	31	43	−12	64	
15	Panserraikos (R)	34	9	10	15	32	38	−6	62	Relegation to Beta Ethniki
16	Proodeftiki (R)	34	5	14	15	29	52	−23	58	Relegation to Beta Ethniki
17	OFI (R)	34	5	11	18	28	61	−33	55	Relegation to Beta Ethniki
18	EPA Larnaca (Note: EPA Larnaca were deducted 1 point.) (R)	34	3	4	27	23	76	−53	43	Moving to Cypriot First Division

Source: RSSSF
Rules for classification: 1st points; 2nd decision match; 3rd head-to-head goal difference.
(C) Champions; (R) Relegated

== Results ==
Home \ Away	AEK	APA	ARIS	EGA	EPA	ETH	FOS	IRA	KAV	OFI	OLY	PAO	PAN	PNS	PAOK	PIE	PRO	VER
AEK Athens		2–0	2–0	2–0	3–0	2–1	2–0	2–0	4–0	4–0	2–0	1–1	1–0	2–0	2–0	3–1	6–0	8–2
Apollon Athens	2–1		2–0	0–0	1–0	1–1	1–0	0–0	1–0	3–0	1–0	0–1	1–1	2–1	1–0	0–0	1–1	2–0
Aris	1–1	3–0		2–0	2–1	0–1	1–1	1–1	4–0	3–0	0–0	1–1	1–1	4–1	1–0	1–0	3–0	1–0
Egaleo	0–2	0–2	2–1		0–0	1–0	2–1	0–0	2–1	2–0	1–0	2–0	0–1	2–1	1–0	1–1	2–0	1–0
EPA Larnaca	0–1	0–0	2–1	0–1		0–6	0–2 (Note: EPA Larnaca-Fostiras 0-2 awarded.)	0–1	2–0	1–3	1–2	1–6	1–3	0–2	1–2	2–1	1–1	0–2
Ethnikos Piraeus	1–3	1–0	1–1	1–1	1–0		0–0	1–1	2–1	6–0	0–2	2–2	1–3	1–1	0–0	1–1	1–0	3–1
Fostiras	0–2	2–1	2–2	0–0	3–1	1–1		1–4	1–1	1–1	1–0	0–4	1–2	1–0	1–0	4–2	1–2	1–0
Iraklis	0–1	1–0	1–1	0–0	3–0	1–1	3–0		0–0	3–1	0–0	1–0	2–2	1–1	0–4	1–0	3–1	1–1
Kavala	0–0	1–1	2–1	1–0	2–1	2–1	0–0	1–1		2–0	0–0	1–0	0–1	0–0	1–0	1–0	1–1	3–0
OFI	1–1	2–2	2–2	0–2	3–1	0–0	2–2	1–2	1–0		0–0	2–2	0–2	1–3	2–2	3–2	0–0	1–2
Olympiacos	2–0	0–1	4–1	2–2	3–1	0–1	4–0	1–1	3–0	1–0		0–1	2–1	2–0	1–0	4–0	1–2	5–0
Panathinaikos	2–1	3–1	3–1	0–0	5–1	3–0	1–1	3–1	2–0	1–0	2–2		2–2	2–0	3–0	1–0	2–0	2–0
Panionios	2–2	2–1	2–1	1–2	4–1	0–3	2–0	1–0	3–1	4–0	1–1	2–1		4–1	3–1	1–0	2–1	2–0
Panserraikos	0–1	0–0	1–1	0–0	3–0	2–1	1–1	1–1	0–2	0–1	2–1	0–2	1–0		0–1	4–0	1–0	4–0
PAOK	0–0	0–0	2–2	1–0	3–1	1–0	3–0	0–1	1–0	2–0	0–0	3–2	3–1	1–1		1–2	6–3	0–0
Pierikos	0–0	1–1	0–0	2–1	2–2	2–1	1–1	2–1	2–1	2–1	1–0	0–0	2–2	1–0	0–0		2–2	0–0
Proodeftiki	1–2	1–1	2–1	1–2	2–0	2–2	0–0	1–2	0–0	0–0	1–1	0–2	0–1	0–0	1–1	1–0		1–1
Veria	1–1	2–0	1–0	1–1	2–1	2–2	1–1	1–2	0–0	1–0	0–0	0–0	0–2	2–0	1–0	1–1	3–1	

Source: RSSSF
Legend: Blue = home team win; Yellow = draw; Red = away team win.

== Top scorers ==
Rank	Player	Club	Goals
1	(Greece) Georgios Dedes	Panionios	28
2	(Greece) Mimis Papaioannou	AEK Athens	27
3	(Greece) Mimis Domazos	Panathinaikos	20
4	(Greece) Nikos Gioutsos	Olympiacos	15
4	(Greece) Kostas Nikolaidis	AEK Athens	15
6	(Greece) Alekos Alexiadis	Aris	14
6	(Greece) Antonis Antoniadis	Panathinaikos	14
8	(Cyprus) Pamboullis Papadopoulos	Olympiacos	12
8	(Greece) Dimitris Remoundos	Fostiras	12

== Attendances ==
Olympiacos drew the highest average home attendance in the 1970–71 Alpha Ethniki.

#	Team	Average attendance
1	Olympiacos	27,640
2	Panathinaikos	19,251
3	AEK Athens	19,015
4	PAOK	16,166
5	Iraklis	13,883
6	Ethnikos Piraeus	12,645
7	Aris	10,893
8	Panionios	8,983
9	Proodeftiki	8,199
10	Kavala	7,953
11	Egaleo	6,624
12	Fostiras	6,042
13	Apollon Athens	5,885
14	Panserraikos	5,214
15	OFI	4,210
16	Veria	4,187
17	Pierikos	2,925
18	EPA Larnaca	2,052
