= 1973–74 Beta Ethniki =

Beta Ethniki
- Season: 1973–74
- Dates: 7 October 1973 – 30 June 1974
- Champions: PAS Giannina (Group 1); Kalamata (Group 2); Kastoria (Group 3)
- Promoted: PAS Giannina; Kalamata; Atromitos; Kastoria
- Relegated: Pannafpliakos; Panegialios; AO Petralona; Argonaftis Piraeus; Apollon Mytilene; Anagennisi Giannitsa; Niki Polygyros; Ethnikos Alexandroupoli

Beta Ethniki 1973–74 complete season.

== Group 1 ==
=== League table ===
| Pos | Team | Pld | W | D | L | GF | GA | GD | Pts | Promotion or relegation |
|---|---|---|---|---|---|---|---|---|---|---|
| 1 | PAS Giannina (C, P) | 38 | 25 | 8 | 5 | 76 | 20 | +56 | 58 | Promotion to Alpha Ethniki |
| 2 | Korinthos | 38 | 18 | 12 | 8 | 62 | 37 | +25 | 48 | Qualification for Promotion play-off |
| 3 | Rodos | 38 | 20 | 6 | 12 | 59 | 42 | +17 | 46 | |
| 4 | Ilisiakos | 38 | 18 | 10 | 10 | 40 | 23 | +17 | 46 | |
| 5 | Anagennisi Arta | 38 | 17 | 10 | 11 | 47 | 39 | +8 | 44 | |
| 6 | OFI | 38 | 16 | 11 | 11 | 54 | 35 | +19 | 43 | |
| 7 | Panelefsiniakos | 38 | 15 | 13 | 10 | 33 | 24 | +9 | 43 | |
| 8 | Panetolikos | 38 | 17 | 8 | 13 | 47 | 31 | +16 | 42 | |
| 9 | APO Rouf | 38 | 16 | 7 | 15 | 45 | 34 | +11 | 39 | |
| 10 | Vyzas | 38 | 13 | 12 | 13 | 37 | 37 | 0 | 38 | |
| 11 | Panarkadikos | 38 | 15 | 7 | 16 | 37 | 35 | +2 | 37 | |
| 12 | Atromitos Piraeus | 38 | 15 | 7 | 16 | 49 | 52 | −3 | 37 | |
| 13 | Panargiakos | 38 | 15 | 5 | 18 | 35 | 39 | −4 | 35 | |
| 14 | Kerkyra | 38 | 14 | 7 | 17 | 37 | 45 | −8 | 35 | |
| 15 | Ikaros Athens | 38 | 13 | 8 | 17 | 44 | 55 | −11 | 34 | |
| 16 | Paniliakos | 38 | 12 | 10 | 16 | 34 | 45 | −11 | 34 | |
| 17 | Panaspropyrgiakos | 38 | 9 | 15 | 14 | 30 | 44 | −14 | 33 | |
| 18 | Aias Salamina (O) | 38 | 9 | 13 | 16 | 40 | 50 | −10 | 31 | Qualification for Relegation play-off |
| 19 | Pannafpliakos (R) | 38 | 9 | 10 | 19 | 29 | 51 | −22 | 28 | Relegation to C National Amateur Division |
| 20 | Panegialios (R) | 38 | 2 | 5 | 31 | 14 | 111 | −97 | 9 | Relegation to C National Amateur Division |

(C) Champions; (O) Play-off winners; (P) Promoted; (R) Relegated

== Group 2 ==
=== League table ===
| Pos | Team | Pld | W | D | L | GF | GA | GD | Pts | Promotion or relegation |
|---|---|---|---|---|---|---|---|---|---|---|
| 1 | Kalamata (C, P) | 38 | 24 | 9 | 5 | 70 | 23 | +47 | 57 | Promotion to Alpha Ethniki |
| 2 | Atromitos (P) | 38 | 24 | 9 | 5 | 67 | 19 | +48 | 57 | Qualification for Promotion play-off |
| 3 | Proodeftiki | 38 | 20 | 13 | 5 | 48 | 23 | +25 | 53 | |
| 4 | Chalkida | 38 | 20 | 11 | 7 | 64 | 24 | +40 | 51 | |
| 5 | Anagennisi Karditsa | 38 | 20 | 11 | 7 | 46 | 25 | +21 | 51 | |
| 6 | AO Karditsa | 38 | 15 | 14 | 9 | 44 | 31 | +13 | 44 | |
| 7 | Chania | 38 | 20 | 4 | 14 | 52 | 51 | +1 | 44 | |
| 8 | Ionikos | 38 | 16 | 10 | 12 | 39 | 29 | +10 | 42 | |
| 9 | Olympiacos Liosia | 38 | 15 | 12 | 11 | 48 | 46 | +2 | 42 | |
| 10 | Levadiakos | 38 | 16 | 6 | 16 | 34 | 33 | +1 | 38 | |
| 11 | Acharnaikos | 38 | 15 | 9 | 14 | 45 | 34 | +11 | 37 (Note: 2 points deducted) | |
| 12 | AO Syros | 38 | 14 | 9 | 15 | 47 | 50 | −3 | 37 | |
| 13 | Lamia | 38 | 10 | 14 | 14 | 40 | 38 | +2 | 34 | |
| 14 | Kallithea | 38 | 10 | 12 | 16 | 28 | 37 | −9 | 29 (Note: ?3 points deducted?) | |
| 15 | Achilleas Farsala | 38 | 9 | 11 | 18 | 29 | 53 | −24 | 29 | |
| 16 | Koropi | 38 | 8 | 11 | 19 | 29 | 44 | −15 | 27 | |
| 17 | Phoebus Kremasti | 38 | 9 | 9 | 20 | 33 | 65 | −32 | 27 | |
| 18 | AO Petralona (R) | 38 | 6 | 10 | 22 | 25 | 55 | −30 | 22 | Qualification for Relegation play-off |
| 19 | Argonaftis Piraeus (R) | 38 | 5 | 8 | 25 | 34 | 60 | −26 | 18 | Relegation to C National Amateur Division |
| 20 | Apollon Mytilene (R) | 38 | 2 | 12 | 24 | 19 | 101 | −82 | 16 | Relegation to C National Amateur Division |

(C) Champions; (P) Promoted; (R) Relegated

=== First place play-off ===
| Team 1 | Score | Team 2 |
|---|---|---|
| Kalamata | 1–0 | Atromitos |

== Group 3 ==
=== League table ===
| Pos | Team | Pld | W | D | L | GF | GA | GD | Pts | Promotion or relegation |
|---|---|---|---|---|---|---|---|---|---|---|
| 1 | Kastoria (C, P) | 40 | 28 | 5 | 7 | 83 | 29 | +54 | 61 | Promotion to Alpha Ethniki |
| 2 | Pierikos | 40 | 23 | 7 | 10 | 67 | 21 | +46 | 53 | Qualification for Promotion play-off |
| 3 | Doxa Drama | 40 | 21 | 10 | 9 | 51 | 30 | +21 | 52 | |
| 4 | Naoussa | 40 | 20 | 8 | 12 | 60 | 35 | +25 | 48 | |
| 5 | Trikala | 40 | 16 | 16 | 8 | 55 | 38 | +17 | 48 | |
| 6 | Veria | 40 | 16 | 15 | 9 | 48 | 31 | +17 | 47 | |
| 7 | Almopos Aridea | 40 | 14 | 16 | 10 | 50 | 41 | +9 | 44 | |
| 8 | Panthrakikos | 40 | 16 | 12 | 12 | 43 | 39 | +4 | 44 | |
| 9 | Kilkisiakos | 40 | 14 | 16 | 10 | 36 | 32 | +4 | 44 | |
| 10 | Pandramaikos | 40 | 17 | 7 | 16 | 39 | 44 | −5 | 41 | |
| 11 | Nestos Chrysoupoli | 40 | 13 | 10 | 17 | 40 | 46 | −6 | 36 | |
| 12 | Moudania | 40 | 11 | 13 | 16 | 43 | 49 | −6 | 35 | |
| 13 | Makedonikos | 40 | 10 | 15 | 15 | 33 | 40 | −7 | 35 | |
| 14 | Xanthi | 40 | 13 | 9 | 18 | 30 | 45 | −15 | 35 | |
| 15 | Anagennisi Epanomi | 40 | 12 | 10 | 18 | 39 | 45 | −6 | 34 | |
| 16 | Niki Volos | 40 | 12 | 10 | 18 | 33 | 45 | −12 | 34 | |
| 17 | Foinikas Polichni | 40 | 14 | 6 | 20 | 43 | 58 | −15 | 34 | |
| 18 | Edessaikos | 40 | 10 | 14 | 16 | 26 | 47 | −21 | 34 | |
| 19 | Anagennisi Giannitsa (R) | 40 | 14 | 6 | 20 | 43 | 55 | −12 | 31 (Note: ?3 points deducted?) | Qualification for Relegation play-off |
| 20 | Niki Polygyros (R) | 40 | 8 | 11 | 21 | 27 | 62 | −35 | 27 | Relegation to C National Amateur Division |
| 21 | Ethnikos Alexandroupoli (R) | 40 | 6 | 8 | 26 | 33 | 90 | −57 | 20 | Relegation to C National Amateur Division |

(C) Champions; (P) Promoted; (R) Relegated

== Promotion play-off ==
| Team 1 | Score | Team 2 |
|---|---|---|
| Atromitos | 2–1 | Pierikos |
| Atromitos | 2–1 | Korinthos |
| Pierikos | 1–0 | Korinthos |

| Pos | Team | Pld | W | D | L | GF | GA | GD | Pts | Promotion |
|---|---|---|---|---|---|---|---|---|---|---|
| 1 | Atromitos (P) | 2 | 2 | 0 | 0 | 4 | 2 | +2 | 4 | Promotion to Alpha Ethniki |
| 2 | Pierikos | 2 | 1 | 0 | 1 | 2 | 2 | 0 | 2 | |
| 3 | Korinthos | 2 | 0 | 0 | 2 | 1 | 3 | −2 | 0 | |

(P) Promoted

== Relegation play-off ==
| Team 1 | Score | Team 2 |
|---|---|---|
| Aias Salamina | 6–1 | AO Petralona |
| Aias Salamina | 2–2 | Anagennisi Giannitsa |
| Anagennisi Giannitsa | 1–0 | AO Petralona |

| Pos | Team | Pld | W | D | L | GF | GA | GD | Pts | Relegation |
|---|---|---|---|---|---|---|---|---|---|---|
| 1 | Aias Salamina | 2 | 1 | 1 | 0 | 8 | 3 | +5 | 3 | |
| 2 | Anagennisi Giannitsa (R) | 2 | 1 | 1 | 0 | 3 | 2 | +1 | 3 | Relegation to C National Amateur Division |
| 3 | AO Petralona (R) | 2 | 0 | 0 | 2 | 1 | 7 | −6 | 0 | Relegation to C National Amateur Division |

(R) Relegated
