= G.S. Phoebus Kremasti F.C. =

Greek football club

G.S. Phoebus Kremasti
- Full name: Gymnastikos Philekpaideutikos Syllogos Kremastis "Phoebus"
- Founded: 1927; 99 years ago
- Ground: Kremasti Municipal Stadium, Kremasti, Greece
- Capacity: 2,000
- Chairman: Athina Delaporta
- Manager: Nikolaos Orfanidis
- League: Dodecanese FCA First Division
- 2025–26: Dodecanese FCA First Division, 7th
Home colours	Away colours

G.S. Phoebus Kremasti Football Club is a Greek football club, based in Kremasti, Rhodes, Greece.

== History ==
The club is the successor to G.S. Elpis (Greek: Γ.Σ. Ελπίς), which was founded in 1927. The association was approved by the Italian governor Mario Lago on 28 February, and on 2 March, the first board meeting took place, consisting of Kostis Michalakis (president), Anastasios Anastasiadis (vice president), Ioannis Papanikolaou (secretary), Nikolaos Chalkitis (treasurer), and Michalis Papakonstantinou and Dimitris "Mimikos" K. Paraskevas (board members). On 20 August 1933, the inauguration of the new stadium took place at the Kato Ampela location, where the Municipal Stadium stands today.

Later, "Elpis" was renamed to the Italian equivalent "Speranza". With the arrival of Cesare Maria De Vecchi and the implementation of strict measures aimed at the Italianization of the Dodecanese population, local Greek sports clubs were abolished and Speranza was replaced by "GIL". When football activities were suspended, the locals converted the pitch back into farmland. The club was revived in 1945, with G.S. Kremasti "Foivos" succeeding Elpis. The feast day of Saint Constantine and Helen on 21 May was subsequently established as the club's official celebration day.

In 1964, Phoebus won the Dodecanese FCA First Division championship for the first time and earned a historic promotion to the Beta Ethniki, becoming the fourth club from Rhodes—following Rodiakos, Dorieas, and Diagoras—to represent the island and the Dodecanese in the second tier. The club competed in the Beta Ethniki during the 1964–65 season, but was unable to avoid relegation.

In 1972, Phoebus won the Dodecanese FCA A' Division title once again and qualified for the promotion play-offs. Finishing 1st in Group 5, the club secured its return to the Beta Ethniki, where it competed for three consecutive seasons: 1972–73, 1973–74, and 1974–75.

During the same year, Phoebus also won the Dodecanese FCA Cup and qualified for the Greek Football Amateur Cup. After eliminating A.S. Pontioi Drapetsona (3–0 in Rhodes), A.O. Rethymno (2–0 in Rhodes), A.O. Thiva (1–0 in Thiva), and A.O.N. Argyroupoli (1–0 in Rhodes), the club reached the final. On 29 June 1972, Phoebus defeated G.S. Alexandroupoli 3–2 at the Apostolos Nikolaidis Stadium in Athens, winning the Greek Amateur Cup.

== Stadium ==
The club plays its home matches at the Filippos Delaportas Municipal Stadium in Kremasti, which has a capacity of 2,000 spectators.

== Honours ==
=== Domestic Titles and honours ===
  - Gamma Ethniki champion: 1
    - 1971–72
  - Greek Football Amateur Cup Winners: 2
    - 1971–72, 2012–13
  - Dodecanese FCA champion: 11
    - 1963–64, 1966–67, 1970–71, 1971–72, 1975–76, 1978–79, 1986–87, 1995–96, 2012–13, 2017–18, 2023–24
  - Dodecanese FCA Cup Winners: 9
    - 1971–72, 1978–79, 1983–84, 1986–87, 1987–88, 1993–94, 2012–13, 2013–14, 2025–26
