= Aias Salamina F.C. =

Aias Salamina
- Full name: Aias Salamina Football Club
- Nickname: Ajax
- Founded: 1931; 95 years ago
- Ground: Municipal Stadium of Salamina
- Capacity: 1,500
- Chairman: Panagiotis Papadimitriou
- Manager: Evangelos Laiveras
- League: Pireaus FCA First Division
- 2025–26: Gamma Ethniki (Group 6), 11th (relegated)
Home colours	Away colours

Aias Salamina Football Club (Ajax of Salamis in English, Greek: Αίας Σαλαμίνας) is a Greek football club based in Salamina, Salamis Island. The association was founded in 1931.

== History ==
Aias Salamina was officially founded on February 17, 1931.

In the 1960s and 1970s it played in high leagues against the likes of Olympiacos, Panathinaikos, AEK Athens or PAOK, and many others . After many years in the lower tiers, Aias secured promotion to the third, professional, league of the Greek pyramid in 2007. The pitch is on the road between Salamis city and Aianteio and seats 1500 visitors. The team colours are blue and white.

In the past Aias had gained many championships and cups in lower Hellenic divisions . The club had many emerging players who, after successful stints with Aias, eventually moved to larger Greek teams.

Aias Salaminas derives its name from the Salaminan king Ajax the Great.

== Honours ==
=== Domestic ===
League

- Delta Ethniki
  - Winners (2): 1983–84, 2006–07
- Piraeus FCA Championship
  - Winners (9): 1964–65, 1975–76, 1979–80, 1990–91, 1998–99, 1999–00, 2001–02, 2019–20, 2024–25

Cup

- Piraeus FCA Cup
  - Winners (2): 1990–91, 2006–07

== Positions ==
- 1959–60: Piraeus FCA First Division: 4th
- 1960–61: Piraeus FCA First Division: 6th
- 1961–62: Piraeus FCA First Division: 6th
- 1962–63: Piraeus FCA First Division: 2nd
- 1963–64: Beta Ethniki: 12th
- 1964–65: Piraeus FCA First Division: 1st
- 1965–66: Beta Ethniki: 9th
- 1966–67: Beta Ethniki: 8th
- 1967–68: Beta Ethniki: 15th
- 1968–69: Beta Ethniki: 15th
- 1969–70: Beta Ethniki: 7th
- 1970–71: Beta Ethniki: 10th
- 1971–72: Beta Ethniki: 9th
- 1972–73: Beta Ethniki: 11th
- 1973–74: Beta Ethniki: 18th
- 1974–75: Beta Ethniki: 12th
- 1975–76: Piraeus FCA First Division: 1st
- 1976–77: Piraeus FCA First Division
- 1977–78: Piraeus FCA First Division: 2nd
- 1978–79: Piraeus FCA First Division: 5th
- 1979–80: Piraeus FCA First Division: 1st
- 1980–81: Gamma Ethniki: 3rd
- 1981–82: Gamma Ethniki: 5th
- 1982–83: Delta Ethniki: 2nd
- 1983–84: Delta Ethniki: 1st
- 1984–85: Gamma Ethniki: 21st
- 1985–86: Delta Ethniki: 14th
- 1986–87: Piraeus FCA First Division: 8th
- 1987–88: Piraeus FCA First Division: 6th
- 1988–89: Piraeus FCA First Division: 10th
- 1989–90: Piraeus FCA First Division: 6th
- 1990–91: Piraeus FCA First Division: 1st
- 1991–92: Delta Ethniki: 10th
- 1992–93: Delta Ethniki: 13th
- 1993–94: Delta Ethniki: 17th
- 1994–95: Piraeus FCA First Division: 8th
- 1995–96: Piraeus FCA First Division: 8th
- 1996–97: Piraeus FCA First Division
- 1997–98: Piraeus FCA First Division: 2nd
- 1998–99: Piraeus FCA First Division: 1st
- 1999–2000: Piraeus FCA First Division: 1st
- 2000–01: Delta Ethniki: 14th
- 2001–02: Piraeus FCA First Division: 1st
- 2002–03: Delta Ethniki: 7th
- 2003–04: Delta Ethniki: 3rd
- 2004–05: Delta Ethniki: 3rd
- 2005–06: Delta Ethniki: 5th
- 2006–07: Delta Ethniki: 1st
- 2007–08: Gamma Ethniki: 8th
- 2008–09: Gamma Ethniki: 13th
- 2009–10: Gamma Ethniki: 12th
- 2010–11: Football League 2: 10th
- 2011–12: Delta Ethniki: 12th
- 2012–13: Piraeus FCA First Division: 16th
- 2013–14: Piraeus FCA Second Division: 2nd
- 2014–15: Piraeus FCA First Division: 9th
- 2015–16: Piraeus FCA First Division: 16th
- 2016–17: Piraeus FCA Second Division: 2nd
- 2017–18: Piraeus FCA First Division: 6th
- 2018–19: Piraeus FCA First Division: 3rd
- 2019–20: Piraeus FCA First Division: 1st
- 2020–21: Delta Ethniki: 4th
- 2021–22: Gamma Ethniki: 9th
- 2022–23: Piraeus FCA First Division: 3rd
- 2023–24: Piraeus FCA First Division: 2nd
- 2024-25: Piraeus FCA first Division: 1st
- 2025–26: Gamma Ethniki: 11th

Since 1959–60:

- 11 seasons in Beta Ethniki
- 9 seasons in Gamma Ethniki
- 14 seasons in Delta Ethniki
- 31 seasons in Piraeus FCA First Division
- 2 seasons in Piraeus FCA Second Division
