= S.F.K. Pierikos (football) =

Football club in Katerini, Greece

Pierikos
- Full name: Σύνδεσμος Φιλάθλων Κατερίνης Πιερικός; Sýndesmos Filáthlo̱n Katerínis Pierikós (Pierian Supporters' Association of Katerini)
- Nicknames: Ο Άρχοντας του Βορρά; O Árchontas toú Vorrá (The Lord of the North)
- Founded: 1928; 98 years ago, as Megas Alexandros Katerini 11 April 1961; 65 years ago, as S.F.K. Pierikos
- Ground: Municipal Stadium of Katerini
- Capacity: 4,995 (all seated)
- Investor: Parent Club
- President: Fotis Theos
- Manager: Stefanos Tavouktsis
- League: Gamma Ethniki
- 2025–26: Gamma Ethniki (Group 2), 6th
- Website: https://www.pierikosfc.gr/
Home colours	Away colours	Third colours

P.A.E. Pierikos (Greek: Π.Α.Ε. Πιερικός) is a Greek football club based in Katerini, Greece, part of the major multi-sport club S.F.K. Pierikos (Greek: Σ.Φ.Κ. Πιερικός). Their name was inspired from the State's name of Pieria. The club competes in Gamma Ethniki.

== History of the club ==
=== The foundation ===
The club was founded on 11 April 1961 from the merger between Megas Alexandros (meaning Alexander the Great) Katerinis and Olympos Katerinis. Megas Alexandros had played in the 1st Division of Greek football in its first season (1959–60) but finished in the 15th position and thus relegated in the 2nd Division. Neither Megas Alexandros nor Olympos gained promotion in the following season. Unification of the two clubs has seen as the only way for the city of Katerini to have a team in the 1st Division. Therefore, Pierikos was born.

=== History ===
In 1963, Pierikos played for the first time in the First National Division where he stayed for 9 whole years, while in the same year reached the final of the Greek Cup facing Olympiakos. Club's performances were often impressive, as it consistently finished in the top 10 of scoreboard of the league. In 1972 was demoted but returned soon. In 1975 the team got promoted to the First Division again and remained for 3 years. The club was then demoted again. Pierikos was promoted three more times to the First National, but never managed to establish itself again in the 1st Division. The biggest distinction of the club was to finish 3 times in the 5th place of the championship, but also the Cup final against Olympiakos in 1963 where it was defeated 3–0.

=== The 1960s ===
- In its first season (1961–62) Pierikos took the place of Megas Alexandros in the 2nd Division. It played in the Group of Western and Central Macedonia and finished 1st. Therefore, it was able to play in the 2nd Division play-offs. In the final Pierikos won 2–0 in a match against Olympiakos Kozanis and gained promotion to the 1st Division. In this season Pierikos scored 108 goals and conceded 28.
- In its first season (1962–63), in the 1st division Pierikos finished in the 9th position scoring 36 goals and conceding 37. His biggest win was a 4–0 against Aris Pierikos also played in the Greek Cup final this season. The club suffered a 3–0 defeat by Olympiacos.
- In the 1963–64 season, Pierikos finished in the 7th position. Their biggest wins were, a 5–1 against Doxa Drama and a 4–0 against Ethnikos Piraeus. The club scored 34 and conceded 42 goals. Pierikos also played in the Greek Cup semi-final, where they suffered a 3–1 defeat by AEK Athens. By that victory AEK essentially won the trophy, because the other semi-final between Olympiacos and Panathinaikos never ended and they were both injected from the tournament. Thus AEK were awarded the Greek Cup by the HFF.
- The 1964–65 season is, probably, the best season in the history of Pierikos. Pierikos finished in the 5th position scoring 39 and conceding 39. Its biggest win was a 4–0 against Niki Volos.
- In the 1965–66 season, Pierikos finished in the 8th position. Its biggest win was a 5–1 against AO Trikala. The club scored 40 and conceded 40 goals.
- In the 1966–67 season, Pierikos finished in the 14th position. Its biggest win was a 4–1 against Vyzas Megaron. The club scored 36 and conceded 51 goals.
- In the 1967–68 season, Pierikos finished in the 5th position. Its biggest win was a 9–1 against Olympiakos Nicosia. This is the biggest victory of the club, in the 1st Division, ever. The club scored 42 and conceded 46 goals.
- In the 1968–69 season, Pierikos finished in the 9th position. Its biggest win was a 5–1 against Apollon Athens. The club scored 31 and conceded 37 goals.

=== The 1970s ===
- In the 1969–70 season, Pierikos finished in the 7th position. Its biggest win was a 3–0 against Olympiakos Nicosia. The club scored 45 and conceded 44 goals.
- In the 1970–71 season, Pierikos finished in the 14th position. The club didn't manage to win any single game by more than one goal. The club scored 31 and conceded 43 goals. The club started showing signs of fatigue.
- And these signs became totally clear in the 1971–72 season. Pierikos finished in the 16th position (out of 18 clubs) and thus relegated from the 1st Division. Its biggest wins were a 3–0 against Olympiakos Nicosia, a 3–0 against Panionios and a 3–0 against Olympiacos Volos. The club scored 26 and conceded 48 goals.
- In the 1972–73 season, Pierikos participated in the Northern Group of the 2nd Division (the 2nd division was then divided into 3 groups). The club finished in the 4th position of the group managing to score 49 goals and conceding 32.
- In the 1973–74 season, Pierikos participated in the Northern Group of the 2nd Division again. The club finished in the 2nd position of the group. Its biggest win was a 6–0 versus Doxa Drama.
- In the 1974–75 season, Pierikos participated in the 2nd division and gained promotion to the 1st Division.
- In the 1975–76 season, Pierikos participated in the 1st Division. The club finished in the 11th position. It scored 26 and conceded 38 goals. Its biggest wins were a 3–0 against PAS Giannina and a 4–1 against Iraklis.
- In the 1976–77 season, Pierikos finished in the 12th position. Its biggest wins were a 4–1 against Aris, a 4–1 against Panserraikos and a 5–2 against Apollon Athens.
- In the 1977–78 season, Pierikos finished in the 17th position and relegated from the 1st Division. Its biggest wins were a 4–0 against Panachaiki and a 4–0 against Egaleo. In this season Pierikos scored 46 goals and conceded 56. The club had the 4th best offense in the division but also the worst defense by far.
- The 1978–79 season, is a black page in the history of the club. Pierikos plays in the Northern Group of the 2nd Division (the 2nd Division was then divided in two groups, each one having 20 clubs). The club finished in the 3rd position having lost a lot of games without match. In that season Pierikos scored a fantastic 10–1 victory against Makedonikos Siatista But in the end of the season, Pierikos was accused of bribing players of Niki Volos in a 3–0 away victory. After these claims, the club was relegated to the National Amateur Division (3rd Division) instead of getting promotion to the 1st Division.

=== The 1980s ===
- In the 1979–80 season, Pierikos played in Group C of the National Amateur Division (3rd Division). The club finished in the 1st position of Group C and gained promotion to the 2nd Division. In that season Pierikos won 12–0 in a home game against AO Artaki, which is the biggest league victory of the club ever. In the Greek Cup scores an amazing 16–0 against minnows Arahos. This is the biggest victory of the club ever.
- In the 1980–81 season, Pierikos played in the Northern Group of the 2nd Division. Unfortunately for Pierikos, Iraklis played in the same group. Iraklis are one of the biggest clubs in Greece, and that was the only season that Iraklis didn't play in the 1st Division. Iraklis were relegated because of accusations of bribing. Pierikos finally finished in the 2nd position with 58 points. In that season Pierikos scored 50 and conceded 34 goals. Its biggest win was a 4–0 against Agrotikos Asteras.
- In the 1981–82 season, played in the 2nd Division.
- In the 1982–83 season, Pierikos played in the 2nd Division. The club finished in the 7th position scoring 52 goals and conceding 42.
- In the 1983–84 season, Pierikos played in the 2nd Division. Pierikos finished in the 2nd position and got promoted to the 1st Division. The club collected 49 points out of 38 games by winning 22 of its 38 games, drawing 5 and losing 11. It collected the same points with Panachaiki but Panachaiki won the title on aggregate. The club scored 71 goals and conceded 45.
- In the 1984–85 season, Pierikos plays in the 1st Division. The never managed to play near an acceptable level through the whole season. It only managed to win 3 games in 30 games and finally it finished in the 16th (and last) position and got relegated It scored 29 and conceded 77 goals.
- In the rest of the decade, the club managed nothing more than middle-table mediocrity in the 2nd Division. In some seasons the club managed to avoid relegation in the last match.

=== The 1990s ===
- In the 1989–90 season, Pierikos had another mediocre season in the 2nd Division.
- But in the 1990–91 season, the club finished in the 3rd position of the 2nd Division and won promotion to the 1st Division. The club grabbed the 3rd position on the last matchday of the championship, after a 3–0 home win against Proodeftiki. In that season Pierikos scored 52 and conceded 31 goals. The club managed to win 15 of its games drawn 10 and lost 10. The season-high win was an 8–0 home win against Kavala.
- In the 1991–92 season, the club finished in the 11th position in the 1st Division. The club scored 41 and conceded 56, while collecting 30 points out of 34 games.
- In the 1992–93 season, the club finished in the 16th position in the 1st Division and thus relegated. Pierikos won its last game by a 3–2 scoreline against AO Skoda Xanthi. Edessaikos, another relegation candidate club, also won its last match against AS PAOK Salonica in the home of PAOK. It was PAOK's first home defeat of the season.
- In the rest of the 1990s, Pierikos experienced, middle-table mediocrity in the 2nd Division and even managed to get relegated to the 3rd Division by the end of the decade.

=== The 2000s ===
- In the 2000–01 season, Pierikos was relegated in the 2nd division for the first time in the history of the club.
- The next three seasons, Pierikos played in the Delta Ethniki (4th Division – 10 Groups) and struggled to get promotion to the 3rd Division. The club finally made it in the Gamma Ethniki when it finished 1st in the 3rd Group (football clubs from Florina, Grevena, Imathia, Kozani, Kastoria and Pieria) of the Regional Championship and won promotion to the 3rd Division.
- In the 2005–06 season, Pierikos played in the Northern Group of the 3rd Division. The club finished in the 4th position of the group.
- In the 2006–07 season, Pierikos played in the Northern Group of the 3rd Division. The club finished in the 1st position of the group and after collecting 75 points out of 32 games. The club got promoted to the 2nd division. The biggest win of the season was a 4–0 encounter against title contenders Lamia. The club scored 64 goals and conceded 23.
- In the 2007–08 season, Pierikos played in the Northern Group of the 3rd Division. The club finished in the 13th position of the group.
- In the 2008–09 season, Pierikos played in the Northern Group of the 3rd Division. The club finished in the 10th position of the group.

=== The 2010s ===
- In the 2009–10 season, Pierikos finished in the 6th position of the 2nd Division. The club scored 41 and conceded 31.
- In the 2010–11 season, Pierikos finished in the 9th position of the 2nd Division.The club scored 39 and conceded 43.
- In the 2011–12 season, Pierikos finished in the 8th position of the 2nd Division. The club scored 41 and conceded 30.
- In the 2012–13 season, Pierikos finished in the 19th position of the 2nd Division. The club scored 33 and conceded 61.
- In the 2013–14 season, Pierikos finished in the 11th position of the 2nd Division. The club scored 20 and conceded 34.
- In the 2014–15 season, Pierikos finished in the 8th position of the Northern Group of 2nd Division and 10 points subtraction and thus relegated due to debts to the players. The club scored 19 and conceded 29.
- In the 2015–16 season, Pierikos played in the 2nd Group of the 3rd Division. The club finished in the 5th position of the group. The club scored 35 and conceded 24.
- In the 2016–17 season, Pierikos played in the 2nd Group of the 3rd Division. The club finished in the 10th position of the group. The club scored 21 and conceded 35.
- In the 2017–18 season, Pierikos played in the 2nd Group of the 3rd Division. The club finished in the 6th position of the group. The club scored 25 and conceded 29.
- In the 2018–19 season, Pierikos plays in the 4th Group of the 3rd Division.The club finished in the 7th position of the group. The club scored 31 and conceded 37.

=== Modern history ===
- In the 2019–20 season, Pierikos plays in the 3rd Group of the 4th Division.The club finished in the 1st position of the group and got promoted to Football League. The club scored 45 and conceded 6 having the best defense of the division at that season.
- In the 2020–21 season, Pierikos plays in the Northern Group of the 3rd Division.The club finished in the 5th position of the group and got promoted to SL2 due to merge of 2nd and 3rd Division. The club scored 23 and conceded 22 goals at that season.
- In the 2021-22 season Pierikos plays in Super League 2.The club finished in the 14th position of the group, gathering 32 pts and got relegated to Gamma Ethniki.The club scored 36 and conceded 49 goals at that season.
- For the season 2022–23 Pierikos will play at the Gamma Ethniki.

== 2007–2008 season ==
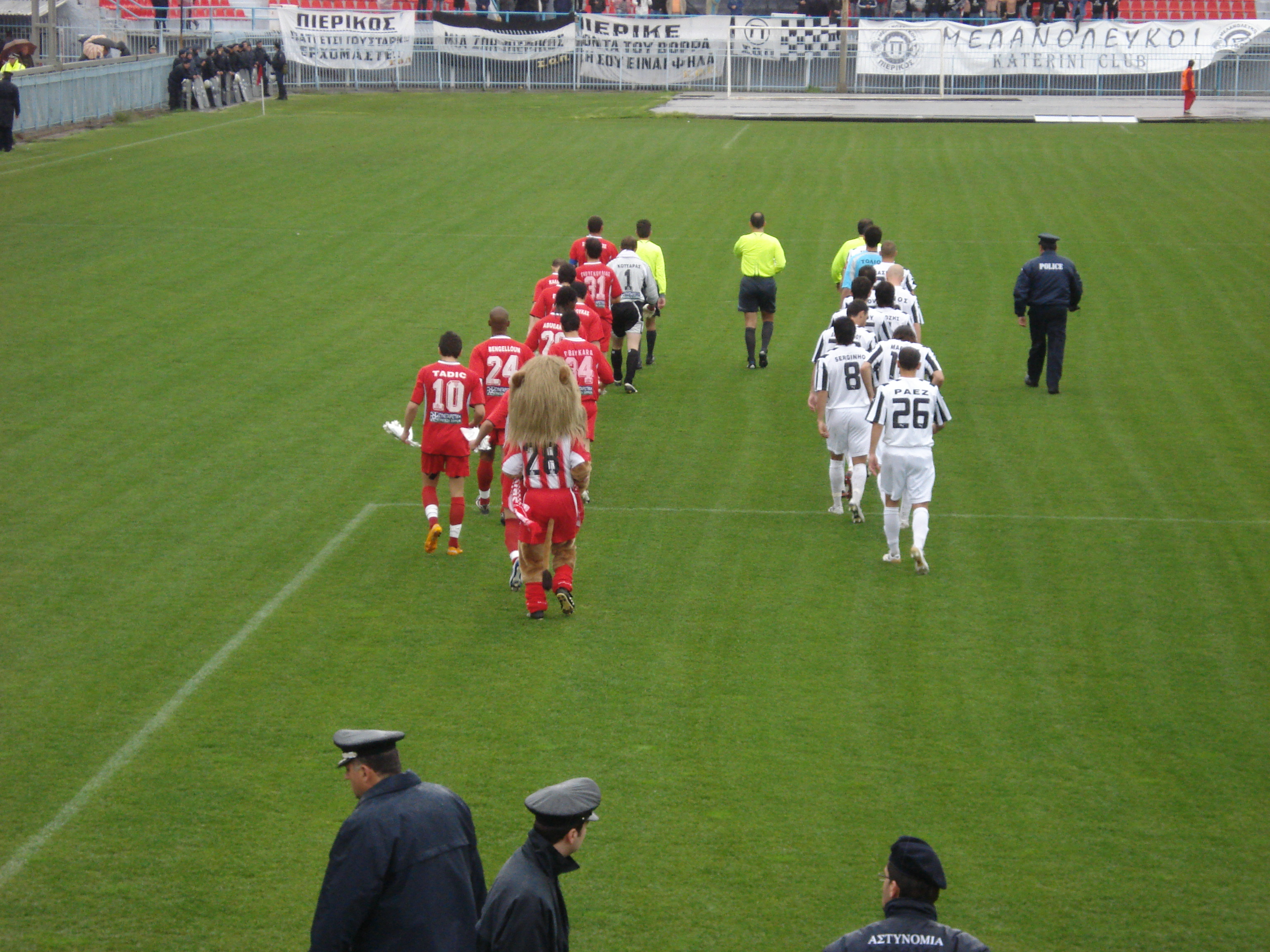
Pierikos team 2008 (right) in match with Panserraikos (left)

- Pierikos started in fascinating manner in the 2007–08 season. In the first matchday Pierikos won Kastoria by 3–0 (Pierikos' biggest win in the season) at home. In the second matchday Pierikos played again at home and won 2–1 versus PAS Giannina. After that Pierikos' manager Giorgos Vazakas resigned and the team was unable to find its starting form under guidance of German manager Thomas Kost.
- In a game against Olympiacos Volos the match referee showed 9 yellow cards, 2 red cards to the players of Pierikos plus a dubious penalty for Olympiacos Volos (saved by the goalkeeper of Pierikos). Besides the team playing with 9 players, almost all of them having yellow cards, Pierikos was able to hold the match in a 0–0 score until the 68th minute. Then the referee Sidiropoulos gave a dubious foul, just outside the Pierikos area which ended up in the net making the score 1–0. After the 80th minute 3 players of Pierikos got out of the game for getting injured (Serginho 82', Garozis 84', Kalambakas 89') and thus Pierikos had just 3 players on field. The final whistle had gone in the 89th minute of the game. In the end 48 fouls were given against Pierikos, while only 8 against Olympiacos Volos.
- A disciplinary committee decided that the game should be recorded as a 3–0 win by Olympiacos Volos, plus Pierikos should have 3 points deducted. Their decision was based on the assumption that the Pierikos players were making up their injuries in their game against Olympiacos Volos.
- Pierikos struggled until the end of the season to avoid relegation to the 3rd Division, and finally managed it after an away win against Ionikos in the last matchday with a score of 1–0.
- The team finally ended the league in the 13th position (out of 18 teams) gathering 42 points. The team scored 28 goals (the league's 3rd worst scoring record) and conceded 31 This was the 3rd best defence after the league champions Panserraikos (conceded 19 goals) and the league runner-up Thrasyvoulos (conceded 27).

== Crest and colours ==
=== Emblem ===
1970's
(never used)

Middle 90's

Pierikos' classical encircled letter Π

2015–present

=== Home kit ===
1960s
1970s
1980s
1990s
2000s
2010s

== Grounds ==
Municipal Stadium of Katerini
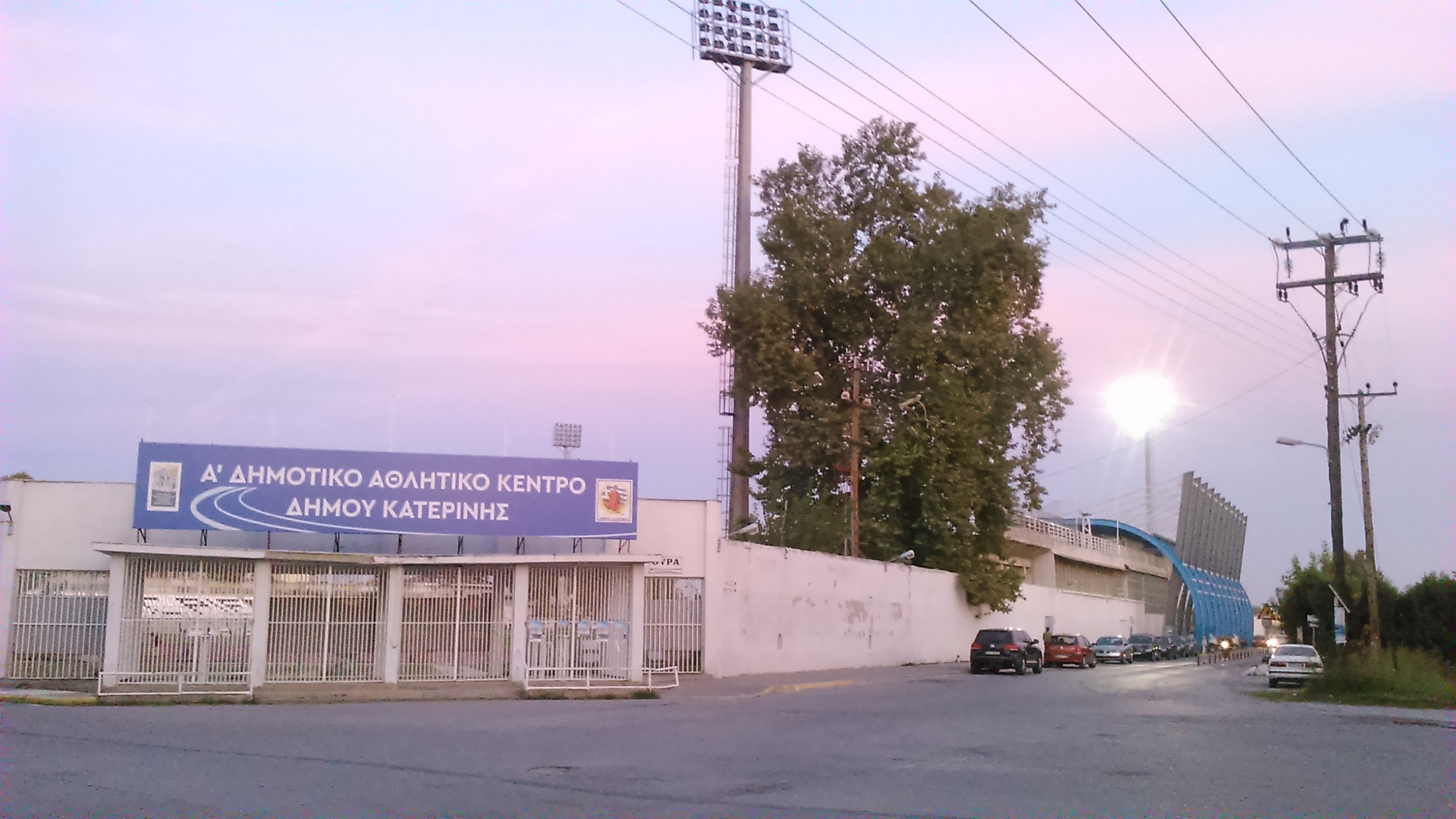
- Capacity: 4.995
- Field size: 105 m × 68 m (344 ft × 223 ft)

Construction
- Groundbreaking: 1961
- Opened: 1964

The Municipal Stadium of Katerini (or better 1st Municipal Athletic Center of Katerini), which was recently renamed, since it was previously National Stadium of Katerini, is located at the National Stadium District in the city of Katerini. It has a capacity of 4,956 spectators. It has two stands (there are no petals behind the hearths). The central part of one radius is covered. It also features projectors for night races. There are 8 lanes with tartan and other spaces for classic sports.

It is the headquarters of the Pierikos team, although it has occasionally hosted other teams such as Vataniakos and Ethnikos Katerini's due to the lack of another stadium in Katerini that would qualify for the accusations.

== Staff ==
=== Notable former managers ===
- Harry Aurednik
- Alex Petrovič
- Panos Markovič
- Nikos Alefantos
- Dezső Bundzsák
- Rudolf Ilovsky
- Makis Katsavakis
- Giannis Matzourakis
- Soulis Papadopoulos
- Georgios Chatzaras
- Michalis Ziogas
- Giorgos Foiros

== Management ==
Position	Staff
President	
CEO	
Parent Club's Representative	
Members	

=== Former presidents ===
(as professional team)

Years	Name
1984–1985	(Greece) Evangelos Mitras
1989–1991	(Greece) Giannis Felekidis
1991–1994	(Greece) Ilias Ioannidis
1994–1996	(Greece) Polis Sidiropoulos
2007–2011	(Greece) Giannis Ntoumos
2011–2015	(Greece) Konstantinos Papadopoulos
2021-2022	(Greece) Stavros Natsiavas

== Finances and ownership ==
Pierikos F.C. is fully owned by the parent club S.F.K. Pierikos.

== Honours ==
- Second Division
  - Winner (2): 1961–62, 1974–75,
  - Runner-up (3): 1973–74, 1980–81, 1983–84
- Third Division
  - Winner (3): 1979–80, 2006–07
  - Runner-up (1): 1997–98
- Fourth Division
  - Winner (3): 2002–03, 2004–05, 2019–20
- Greek Cup
  - Runner-up (1): 1962–63

== League participation ==
- First Division (16): 1962–1972, 1975–1978, 1984–1985, 1991–1993
- Second Division (29): 1961–1962, 1972–1975, 1978–1979, 1980–1984, 1985–1991, 1993–1996, 1998–2000, 2007–2015, 2021–2022
- Third Division (16): 1979–1980, 1996–1998, 2000–2001, 2005–2007, 2015–2019, 2020–2021, 2022–present
- Fourth Division (5): 2001–2005, 2019–2020
