= 1974–75 Beta Ethniki =

Beta Ethniki
- Season: 1974–75
- Dates: 29 September 1974 – 29 June 1975
- Champions: Panetolikos (Group 1); Apollon Athens (Group 2); Pierikos (Group 3)
- Promoted: Panetolikos; Apollon Athens; Pierikos
- Relegated: Anagennisi Arta; Kallithea; APO Rouf; Vyzas; Panargiakos; Paniliakos; Ikaros Athens; AO Syros; Kerkyra; AO Karditsa; Aias Salamina; Acharnaikos; Dimitra Trikala; Panaspropyrgiakos; Niki Volos; Phoebus Kremasti; Diagoras; AE Moschato; Doxa Vyronas; Apollon Kalamarias; Kilkisiakos; Makedonikos; Nestos Chrysoupoli; Foinikas Polichni; Moudania; Achilleas Farsala; Makedonikos Siatista; Ethnikos Sidirokastro; Edessaikos

Beta Ethniki 1974–75 complete season.

== Group 1 ==
=== League table ===
| Pos | Team | Pld | W | D | L | GF | GA | GD | Pts | Promotion or relegation |
|---|---|---|---|---|---|---|---|---|---|---|
| 1 | Panetolikos (C, P) | 38 | 22 | 10 | 6 | 75 | 27 | +48 | 54 | Promotion to Alpha Ethniki |
| 2 | Panelefsiniakos | 38 | 19 | 15 | 4 | 49 | 24 | +25 | 53 | |
| 3 | Chalkida | 38 | 22 | 6 | 10 | 70 | 31 | +39 | 50 | |
| 4 | Chania | 38 | 19 | 10 | 9 | 51 | 27 | +24 | 48 | |
| 5 | OFI | 38 | 17 | 9 | 12 | 58 | 38 | +20 | 43 | |
| 6 | Fostiras | 38 | 14 | 14 | 10 | 37 | 33 | +4 | 42 | |
| 7 | Korinthos | 34 | 17 | 7 | 10 | 54 | 38 | +16 | 41 | |
| 8 | Olympiacos Liosia | 38 | 15 | 11 | 12 | 51 | 47 | +4 | 41 | |
| 9 | Ionikos | 38 | 12 | 16 | 10 | 54 | 36 | +18 | 40 | |
| 10 | AFC Patra | 38 | 15 | 10 | 13 | 46 | 47 | −1 | 40 | |
| 11 | Panarkadikos (O) | 38 | 15 | 9 | 14 | 44 | 48 | −4 | 39 | Qualification for Relegation play-off |
| 12 | Anagennisi Arta (R) | 38 | 12 | 11 | 15 | 36 | 58 | −22 | 35 | Relegation to C National Amateur Division |
| 13 | Kallithea (R) | 38 | 12 | 12 | 14 | 36 | 33 | +3 | 33 (Note: ?3 points deducted?) | Relegation to C National Amateur Division |
| 14 | APO Rouf (R) | 38 | 10 | 14 | 14 | 40 | 42 | −2 | 31 (Note: APO Rouf had 3 points deducted.) | Relegation to C National Amateur Division |
| 15 | Vyzas (R) | 38 | 10 | 10 | 18 | 34 | 51 | −17 | 30 | Relegation to C National Amateur Division |
| 16 | Panargiakos (R) | 38 | 10 | 9 | 19 | 42 | 59 | −17 | 29 | Relegation to C National Amateur Division |
| 17 | Paniliakos (R) | 38 | 12 | 5 | 21 | 33 | 74 | −41 | 29 | Relegation to C National Amateur Division |
| 18 | Ikaros Athens (R) | 38 | 8 | 12 | 18 | 30 | 61 | −31 | 28 | Relegation to C National Amateur Division |
| 19 | AO Syros (R) | 38 | 9 | 9 | 20 | 24 | 45 | −21 | 27 | Relegation to C National Amateur Division |
| 20 | Kerkyra (R) | 38 | 8 | 5 | 25 | 29 | 74 | −45 | 16 (Note: Kerkyra had 5 points deducted.) | Relegation to C National Amateur Division |

(C) Champions; (O) Play-off winners; (P) Promoted; (R) Relegated

== Group 2 ==
=== League table ===
| Pos | Team | Pld | W | D | L | GF | GA | GD | Pts | Promotion or relegation |
|---|---|---|---|---|---|---|---|---|---|---|
| 1 | Apollon Athens (C, P) | 38 | 25 | 5 | 8 | 69 | 31 | +38 | 55 | Promotion to Alpha Ethniki |
| 2 | Proodeftiki | 38 | 19 | 8 | 11 | 66 | 41 | +25 | 46 | |
| 3 | Anagennisi Karditsa | 38 | 20 | 6 | 12 | 58 | 33 | +25 | 46 | |
| 4 | Rodos | 38 | 21 | 6 | 11 | 63 | 34 | +29 | 45 (Note: Rodos, Trikala and Phoebus Kremasti had 3 points deducted.) | |
| 5 | Ilisiakos | 38 | 16 | 12 | 10 | 39 | 33 | +6 | 44 | |
| 6 | Lamia | 38 | 16 | 11 | 11 | 44 | 32 | +12 | 43 | |
| 7 | Atromitos Piraeus | 38 | 15 | 13 | 10 | 54 | 45 | +9 | 43 | |
| 8 | Trikala | 38 | 16 | 13 | 9 | 72 | 36 | +36 | 42 | |
| 9 | Levadiakos | 38 | 14 | 14 | 10 | 38 | 29 | +9 | 42 | |
| 10 | Koropi | 38 | 17 | 8 | 13 | 46 | 47 | −1 | 42 | |
| 11 | AO Karditsa (R) | 38 | 15 | 10 | 13 | 57 | 42 | +15 | 40 | Qualification for Relegation play-off |
| 12 | Aias Salamina (R) | 38 | 14 | 12 | 12 | 38 | 47 | −9 | 40 | Relegation to C National Amateur Division |
| 13 | Acharnaikos (R) | 38 | 13 | 10 | 15 | 43 | 44 | −1 | 36 | Relegation to C National Amateur Division |
| 14 | Dimitra Trikala (R) | 38 | 14 | 7 | 17 | 50 | 50 | 0 | 35 | Relegation to C National Amateur Division |
| 15 | Panaspropyrgiakos (R) | 38 | 14 | 7 | 17 | 42 | 53 | −11 | 35 | Relegation to C National Amateur Division |
| 16 | Niki Volos (R) | 38 | 8 | 15 | 15 | 41 | 45 | −4 | 31 | Relegation to C National Amateur Division |
| 17 | Phoebus Kremasti (R) | 38 | 12 | 8 | 18 | 48 | 79 | −31 | 29 | Relegation to C National Amateur Division |
| 18 | Diagoras (R) | 38 | 9 | 8 | 21 | 40 | 69 | −29 | 26 | Relegation to C National Amateur Division |
| 19 | AE Moschato (R) | 38 | 3 | 11 | 24 | 24 | 69 | −45 | 17 | Relegation to C National Amateur Division |
| 20 | Doxa Vyronas (R) | 38 | 4 | 6 | 28 | 36 | 109 | −73 | 14 | Relegation to C National Amateur Division |

(C) Champions; (P) Promoted; (R) Relegated

=== Eleventh place play-off ===
| Team 1 | Score | Team 2 |
|---|---|---|
| AO Karditsa | 2–0 | Aias Salamina |

== Group 3 ==
=== League table ===
| Pos | Team | Pld | W | D | L | GF | GA | GD | Pts | Promotion or relegation |
|---|---|---|---|---|---|---|---|---|---|---|
| 1 | Pierikos (C, P) | 38 | 25 | 9 | 4 | 84 | 27 | +57 | 59 | Promotion to Alpha Ethniki |
| 2 | Naoussa | 38 | 20 | 10 | 8 | 54 | 34 | +20 | 50 | |
| 3 | Doxa Drama | 38 | 19 | 10 | 9 | 59 | 28 | +31 | 48 | |
| 4 | Veria | 38 | 18 | 11 | 9 | 49 | 24 | +25 | 47 | |
| 5 | Panthrakikos | 38 | 16 | 11 | 11 | 43 | 35 | +8 | 43 | |
| 6 | Almopos Aridea | 38 | 14 | 11 | 13 | 48 | 35 | +13 | 39 | |
| 7 | Apollon Kalamarias (Note: Apollon Kalamarias was demoted due to the corruption.) (R) | 38 | 13 | 13 | 12 | 38 | 29 | +9 | 39 | Relegation to C National Amateur Division |
| 8 | Anagennisi Epanomi | 38 | 16 | 7 | 15 | 34 | 37 | −3 | 39 | |
| 9 | Xanthi | 38 | 15 | 9 | 14 | 32 | 38 | −6 | 39 | |
| 10 | Pandramaikos | 38 | 11 | 16 | 11 | 39 | 31 | +8 | 38 | |
| 11 | Kozani | 38 | 17 | 4 | 17 | 34 | 39 | −5 | 38 | Qualification for Relegation play-off |
| 12 | Kilkisiakos (R) | 38 | 15 | 7 | 16 | 41 | 55 | −14 | 37 | Relegation to C National Amateur Division |
| 13 | Makedonikos (R) | 38 | 15 | 6 | 17 | 44 | 41 | +3 | 36 | Relegation to C National Amateur Division |
| 14 | Nestos Chrysoupoli (R) | 38 | 11 | 14 | 13 | 36 | 39 | −3 | 36 | Relegation to C National Amateur Division |
| 15 | Foinikas Polichni (R) | 38 | 10 | 13 | 15 | 40 | 47 | −7 | 33 | Relegation to C National Amateur Division |
| 16 | Moudania (R) | 38 | 10 | 12 | 16 | 29 | 44 | −15 | 32 | Relegation to C National Amateur Division |
| 17 | Achilleas Farsala (R) | 38 | 10 | 11 | 17 | 30 | 57 | −27 | 31 | Relegation to C National Amateur Division |
| 18 | Makedonikos Siatista (R) | 38 | 13 | 5 | 20 | 38 | 68 | −30 | 28 (Note: Makedonikos Siatista and Edessaikos had 3 points deducted.) | Relegation to C National Amateur Division |
| 19 | Ethnikos Sidirokastro (R) | 39 | 5 | 13 | 21 | 26 | 56 | −30 | 21 (Note: Ethnikos Sidirokastro had 2 points deducted.) | Relegation to C National Amateur Division |
| 20 | Edessaikos (R) | 38 | 6 | 12 | 20 | 26 | 60 | −34 | 21 | Relegation to C National Amateur Division |

(C) Champions; (P) Promoted; (R) Relegated

=== Eleventh place play-off ===
| Team 1 | Score | Team 2 |
|---|---|---|
| Pandramaikos | 2–1 | Kozani |

== Relegation play-off ==
| Team 1 | Score | Team 2 |
|---|---|---|
| Panarkadikos | 2–0 | AO Karditsa |
| Panarkadikos | 2–1 | Kozani |
| AO Karditsa | 4–1 | Kozani |

| Pos | Team | Pld | W | D | L | GF | GA | GD | Pts | Relegation |
|---|---|---|---|---|---|---|---|---|---|---|
| 1 | Panarkadikos | 2 | 2 | 0 | 0 | 4 | 1 | +3 | 4 | |
| 2 | AO Karditsa (R) | 2 | 1 | 0 | 1 | 4 | 3 | +1 | 2 | Relegation to C National Amateur Division |
| 3 | Kozani (Note: Kozani were spared from relegation due to the demotion of Apollon Kalamarias.) | 2 | 0 | 0 | 2 | 2 | 6 | −4 | 0 | Relegation to C National Amateur Division |

(R) Relegated
