= 1932–33 Greek Football Cup =

1932–33 Greek Cup
Tournament details
- Country: Greece
- Teams: 19

Final positions
- Champions: Ethnikos Piraeus (1st title)
- Runners-up: Aris

Tournament statistics
- Matches played: 19
- Goals scored: 78 (4.11 per match)
- Top goal scorer(s): Vasilios Andrianopoulos (3 goals)

The 1932–33 Greek Football Cup was the second edition of the Greek Football Cup contested by 19 teams. AEK Athens unsuccessfully defended their 1932 title losing to Ethnikos Piraeus in the knock out second round. Aris would unsuccessfully defend their tournament winning streak, losing by 2–1 to Ethnikos Piraeus in the final replay on March 5, at Leoforos Alexandras Stadium against Aris.

== Calendar ==
Round	Date(s)	Fixtures	Clubs	New entries
First Round	30 October 1932	5	19 → 13	19
Second Round	6, 13 November 1932	7	13 → 7	none
Third Round	13, 20 November, 6 December 1932	3	7 → 4	none
Semi-finals	18 December 1932, 29 January 1933	2	4 → 2	none
Final	5 February, 25 March 1933	2	2 → 1	none

== First round ==
Team 1	Score	Team 2
Panathinaikos	5–0	Argonaftis
AEK Athens	3–1	Atromitos
Ethnikos Piraeus	bye	Amina Kokkinia
Apollon Athens	2–1	Asteras Athens
Aris	4–2	Meliteus
Megas Alexandros	1–4	Thermaikos
Attikos	bye	
Goudi	bye	
Olympiacos	bye	
Falirikos Syndesmos	bye	
Iraklis	bye	
Prosfygiki Enosi	bye	

== Knockout phase ==
In the knockout phase, teams play against each other over a single match. If the match ends up as a draw, extra time will be played and if the match remains a draw at the end of the extra time a replay match is set. That procedure will be repeated until a winner occurs. There are no seedings, any teams can be drawn against each other.

== Bracket ==
Second round
Iraklis	3
PAOK	1
Prosfygiki Enosi (bye)
Aris	3
Thermaikos	0
AEK Athens	1	0
Ethnikos Piraeus	1	1
Apollon Athens	2
Attikos	0
Panathinaikos	6
Goudi	1
Olympiacos	4
Falirikos Syndesmos	1

Quarter-finals
Iraklis	6
Prosfygiki Enosi	1
Aris (bye)
Ethnikos Piraeus	2
Apollon Athens	1
Panathinaikos	1
Olympiacos	6

Semi-finals
Iraklis	1
Aris	3
Ethnikos Piraeus	2
Olympiacos	1

Final
Aris	2	1
Ethnikos Piraeus	2	2

== Second round ==
Team 1	Score/Agg.	Team 2	Match	Replay
Olympiacos	4–1	Falirikos Syndesmos		
Panathinaikos	6–1	Goudi		
AEK Athens	1–2	Ethnikos Piraeus	1–1 (a.e.t.)	0–1
Apollon Athens	2–0	Attikos		
Aris	3–0	Thermaikos		
Iraklis	3–1	PAOK		
Prosfygiki Enosi	bye			

== Quarter-finals ==
Team 1	Score	Team 2
Ethnikos Piraeus	2–1	Apollon Athens
Panathinaikos	1–6	Olympiacos
Iraklis	6–1	Prosfygiki Enosi
Aris	bye	

== Semi-finals ==
Team 1	Score	Team 2
Ethnikos Piraeus	2–1	Olympiacos
Iraklis	1–3	Aris

== Final ==
5 February 1933

Aris	2–2 (a.e.t.)	Ethnikos Piraeus
Angelakis 25'; Kitsos 65'	Report	Tsiritakis 30'; Deligiorgis 47'

Aris Stadium, Thessaloniki
Attendance: 7,000
Referee: Takis Douskas

=== Replay match ===
25 March 1933
16:00 EET

Ethnikos Piraeus	2–1	Aris
Tsiritakis 54' (pen.); Alexopoulos 55'	Report	Kaltekis 48'

Leoforos Alexandras Stadium, Athens
Referee: Oikonomopoulos

According to Greek FA's official site, there was only one match.
