= Leonidas Sparta FC =

Greek football club

Leonidas Sparta
- Full name: Π.Α.Σ. Λεωνίδας Σπάρτης
- Founded: 1965; 61 years ago
- Dissolved: 2018; 8 years ago
- Ground: Sparta Municipal Stadium
- Capacity: 1,500

Leonidas Sparta FC (Greek: Π.Α.Σ. Λεωνίδας Σπάρτης) was established in 1965 in Sparta, the capital of Laconia.

Leonidas Sparta played as high as the second tier, the Football League, in 1969–70 season and 1971–72 season.

== History ==
Leonidas Sparta FC has a long history in the field of Laconian and Greek soccer both at amateur and professional level. He was the first professional team of the prefecture of Laconia to compete in the Football League.

== Honours ==
=== Domestic Titles and honours ===
  - Laconia FCA First Division: 8
    - 1968, 1973, 1974, 1983, 1985, 1987, 1991, 1994
  - Laconia FCA Cup: 4
    - 1973, 1992, 1993, 1999
