= A.P.O. Orfeas Egaleo =

Orfeas Egaleo
- Full name: Athlitikos Podosfairikos Omilos Orfeas Egaleo
- Founded: 1928; 98 years ago
- Ground: Egaleo Municipal Stadium
- Chairman: Athanasios Titonis
- Manager: Takis Triantafyllou
- League: Athens FCA Third Division
- 2025–26: Athens FCA Third Division (Group 1), 16th (relegated)

A.P.O. Orfeas Egaleo (or Orpheus) (Greek: Ορφέας Αιγάλεω), is a Greek football club, firstly established in 1928 under the name "Olympias" (Greek: Ολυμπιάς), located in Egaleo, Athens.

== History ==
In 1968 Olympias merged with the local clubs "Ierapolis" (Greek: Ιεράπολις) and "Defence" (Greek: Άμυνα), so Orfeas was ever born. The club took the name of Orfeas Tzanetopoulos who was appointed as mayor without been elected, by the Greek military government (1967–74).

The team took part in the local Athenian leagues until, in 1971, was firstly promoted for the Beta Ethniki playing there for most of the next years (1971–73, 1975–77).

Orfeas also participated in Gamma Ethniki (later Delta Ethniki), in 1970–71, 1974–75 and 1977–78 periods.

== Notable former managers ==
- Sofoklis Koulidis
- Nikolaos Bairaktaris
- Savvas Papazoglou

== Sources ==
- Nikos Dim. Nikolaidis, "50 years Aegaleo" (Greek: 50 χρόνια Αιγάλεω)-Published by Aegaleo Municipality-1998
