= AER Afantou F.C. =

AER Afantou
- Full name: Athlitiki Enosi Rodion Afantou
- Founded: 1946; 80 years ago
- Ground: Afantou Municipal Stadium
- Capacity: 1,500
- Chairman: Evangelia Pavlous
- Manager: Petros Routzieris
- League: Gamma Ethniki
- 2025–26: Gamma Ethniki (Group 5), 5th
Home colours	Away colours

Athlitiki Enosi Rodion Afantou (Greek: Αθλητική Ένωση Ροδίων Αφάντου) is a football club based in Afantou, Rhodes, Greece. Its official colours are red and white.

== History ==
Athlitiki Enosi Rodion Afantou was founded in 1946 and became a founding member of the Dodecanese Football Clubs Association in 1947. In 1975, the club won the Dodecanese FCA championship for the first time and qualified for the 1975 Greek FCA Winners' Championship promotion play-offs, competing in Group 7 where it narrowly missed a historic promotion to the Beta Ethniki.

In 2005, the club once again won the Dodecanese FCA championship and earned promotion for the first time to the Delta Ethniki, where it competed during the 2005–06 season.

In 2007, the club won the Dodecanese FCA championship for a third time and competed once again in the Delta Ethniki, from the 2007–08 until the 2009–10 season, when it finished 15th in Group 8 and was relegated back to the local league.

In 2023, the club was crowned Dodecanese FCA champion and qualified for the 2023 Greek FCA Winners' Championship promotion play-offs, through which it earned promotion to the Gamma Ethniki.

== Stadium ==
The club plays its home matches at the Afantou Municipal Stadium, which has a seating capacity of 1,500.

== Honours ==
=== Regional titles ===
- Dodecanese FCA Championship: 4
  - 1974–75, 2004–05, 2006–07, 2022–23
- Dodecanese FCA Cup: 2
  - 2021–22, 2023–24
- Dodecanese FCA Super Cup: 1
  - 2022–23
