= Apollon Kalythies F.C. =

Association football club in Greece

Apollon Kalythies
- Full name: Athlitikos Syllogos Apollon Kalythies
- Founded: 1947; 79 years ago
- Ground: Kalythies Municipal Stadium
- Capacity: 1,200
- Chairman: Michalis Kafetzis
- Manager: Thanasis Kolitsidakis
- League: Gamma Ethniki
- 2025–26: Gamma Ethniki (Group 5), 9th
Home colours

Athlitikos Syllogos Apollon Kalythies (Greek: Αθλητικός Σύλλογος Απόλλων Καλυθιών) is a football club based in Kalythies, Rhodes, Greece. Founded in 1947, its official colours are yellow and blue.

== History ==
Apollon Kalythies has numerous appearances in the National Amateur Division as well as the Regional Championship of Delta Ethniki, particularly during the 1980s and 1990s. In fact, during the early 1980s, the club contended for promotion to the professional divisions, albeit unsuccessfully. More specifically, during the 1980–81 and 1981–82 seasons, they competed in the Gamma Ethniki, which served as the third tier of Greek football. In 1983–84, 1985–86, and 1986–87, they played in the Delta Ethniki as the fourth tier, whereas in 1987–88, 1990–91, and continuously from the 1999–2000 to the 2003–04 season, they competed in the Delta Ethniki.

In recent years, the club competed in the local Dodecanese FCA First Division. In the 2024–25 season, they won the Dodecanese FCA championship and secured promotion to the national divisions after 21 years via the 2025 Greek Football Clubs Association Winners' Championship special promotion championship. During the same season, Apollon Kalythies completed a domestic double by capturing the Dodecanese FCA Cup, securing a 4–0 victory over Doxa Kardamaina in the final.

During the 2025–26 season, Apollon Kalythies finished in 9th place and subsequently entered the relegation play-outs. In the play-outs, the club secured its division status following a crucial 1–0 victory over Amarynthiakos on matchday 4, with Papourdanos scoring the decisive goal.

== Honours ==
=== Regional ===
- Dodecanese FCA First Division (6): 1979–80, 1982–83, 1984–85, 1989–90, 1998–99, 2024–25
- Dodecanese FCA Cup (4): 1979–80, 2000–01, 2002–03, 2024–25
