= Ialysos F.C. =

Ialysos
- Full name: Gymnastic Athletic Club Ialysos 1948
- Nickname: Τριαντενοί (Trinity)
- Founded: 1948; 78 years ago
- Ground: Municipal Stadium Ekonomideio
- Capacity: 2,000
- Chairman: Georgios Paraskevas
- Manager: Panagiotis Spartalis
- League: Gamma Ethniki
- 2025–26: Dodecanese FCA First Division, 1st (promoted)
Home colours	Away colours

Gymnastic Athletic Club Ialysos Rhodes 1948 (Greek: Γυμναστικός Αθλητικός Σύλλογος Ιάλυσος Ρόδου 1948) is a Greek professional football club based in Ialysos, Dodecanese, Greece. Founded in 1948, the club's official colors are red and yellow. Its name refers to Ialysus, a hero of Greek mythology.

== History ==
The club was originally founded in 1925, during which the Dodecanese belonged to the Kingdom of Italy. GAS Ialysos was officially established in 1948, during which the Dodecanese arrived in the Kingdom of Greece.

In 1992–93, the team won the first place in its group, in the National Division IV, thus winning the promotion to the National Division III. In the following period, 1993–94, they joined the 1st Group finishing second with 67 points, leading to the promotion to 2nd National. During the period 1994–95, they made an impressive run, finishing 3rd with 57 points, 2 points behind Kalamata, losing briefly to the country's top division.

The 1995–96 season was not commensurate, as the team experienced relegation, finishing 15th with 44 points, 1 point behind Panargiakos, just below the relegation zone. After two seasons in the 3rd National, in 1998, the team returned to the 2nd National Division to return to the 2nd National two seasons later, in 2000. Within a year, the team found itself in the 4th National, after 8 seasons. The following season, they were relegated to the local FCA Championships. Dodecanese.

In 2004, Ialysos returned to the Delta Ethniki to return to the local division again in 2007. In 2009, they returned to the National Division for a year and again relegated to the local championships. In 2010, it was announced the merger of the team with "AS". Rhodes Island Revival", creating the "GAS" Renaissance / Ialysos". A year later, in 2011, it was renamed "GAS". Ialysos 1948".

In the 2014–15 season, the club won the Dodecanese FCA First Division championship, which earned them a spot in the 2015 FCA Winners' Championship. Competing in Group 11, they finished in first place and secured promotion to the Gamma Ethniki.

== Stadium ==
The club uses the Ekonomideio Municipal Stadium in Ialysos as its home ground, which has a capacity of 2,000 seats.

== Honours ==
=== Domestic ===
==== League titles ====
- Third Division

Winners (2): 1997–98, 2018–19

- Fourth Division

Winners (1): 1992–93

- Dodecanese FCA Championship (Local Championship)

Winners (8): 1964–65, 1981–82, 2003–04, 2008–09, 2013–14, 2014–15, 2021–22, 2025–26

==== Cups ====
- Dodecanese FCA Cup (Local Cup)

Winners (5): 1957–58, 1977–78, 2014–15, 2015–16, 2022–23
