= A.S. Rodos =

Greek sports club

Rodos
- Full name: Athlitikos Syllogos Rodos; Αθλητικός Σύλλογος Ρόδος
- Nicknames: Ελάφια (Deers); Πράσινοι (Greens)
- Founded: 8 August 1968; 58 years ago
- Ground: Diagoras Stadium
- Capacity: 3,693
- Chairman: Georgios Theodosiou
- Manager: Dimitrios Gaidas
- League: Dodecanese FCA First Division
- 2025–26: Gamma Ethniki (Group 5), 12th (relegated)
Home colours

Athlitikos Syllogos Rodos (Greek: Αθλητικός Σύλλογος Ρόδος; lit. 'Athletic Club Rodos') is a Greek sports club based in the city of Rhodes, Greece. It is active in the sport of football. Its official year of establishment is 1968.

Its football department is the most successful, having made its own mark on Greek football, as it was the first Dodecanese and, more generally, island team (apart from Crete) to compete in the Super League. It uses the Municipal Stadium of Rhodes "Diagoras" as its home ground.

In the past, it had volleyball and judo sections.

== History ==
=== A.S. Rodos (1968–1994) ===
Athlitikos Syllogos Rodos was founded in 1968 by decree of the military junta, which enforced the dissolution and merger of three local clubs in the city of Rhodes—G.S. Diagoras Rodos, A.S. Rodiakos, and D.A.N.S. Dorieus Rodos—in order to create a single unified team. It begins the following season in the Beta Ethniki championship and is promoted to the Alpha Ethniki in 1978. From 1968 to 1974, it records modest campaigns, before its upward trajectory begins in 1975. In 1975, 1976, and 1977, it misses out on first place due to last-minute circumstances. However, in the 1977–78 season, it finishes in 1st place in the Southern Group with 59 points, ahead of its main co-contender, Atromitos, which finished with 52.

In 1980, it is relegated to the Beta Ethniki, but following a playoff match in Heraklion where it defeated Egaleo 1–0, it returns to the Alpha Ethniki, where it competes until 1983. From 1983 to 1985, it plays in the Beta Ethniki, before being relegated to the Gamma Ethniki in 1985 and to the Delta Ethniki in 1988.

=== Enosi Rodos–Diagoras (1994–1998) ===
In 1994, it merges with local rival Diagoras—which had been re-established in 1970—giving rise to Enosi Rodos–Diagoras (Rhodes-Diagoras Union). In 1998, this union is dissolved, and A.S. Rodos is re-established.

=== A.S. Rodos (1998–Present) ===
In the 1999–00 season, in order to strengthen its football department, it merges with the Athlitiki Enosi Panoyannia. The new team competes in the First Division of the Dodecanese FCA. In 2001, it earns promotion to the Delta Ethniki and in 2003 to the Gamma Ethniki, following a playoff match against Pierikos (0–2). The highlight of the new effort that began in 2000 was its pursuit of promotion to the Beta Ethniki during the 2006–07 season, which was narrowly missed in a playoff match against Olympiacos Volos where it was defeated 2–1, remaining in the Gamma Ethniki.

In the 2008–09 season, it finishes as runner-up in the Southern Group of the Gamma Ethniki for yet another year, breaking a European record by remaining undefeated in all matches except for the opening fixture. In a playoff match, A.S. Rodos is defeated 2–1 by the runner-up of the Northern Group, Panetolikos. Immediately following the playoff, the team experienced a month of complete neglect. Antonis Martinis assumed club management, breathing new life into it and proceeding with its squad composition. Approximately two months later, it earns promotion to the Beta Ethniki as a replacement team taking the spot of Apollon Kalamarias, which was relegated to the Delta Ethniki due to failing to submit a participation entry for the 2009–10 championship.

During the presidency of Martinis, A.S. Rodos acquired a squad in the Beta Ethniki featuring players such as Pedro Irala and Žarko Lazetić. This team secured victories against Olympiacos Volos and A.O. Kerkyra during the first half of the championship. The team was later relegated from the Beta Ethniki after participating in the relegation playoff matches.

In the Beta Ethniki championship, A.S. Rodos finishes in 16th place in the standings and is relegated once again to the Gamma Ethniki, having earned the reputation of being the cleanest team in the national championships for refusing to yield to the system of betting and match-fixing. It is well known that during the team's stint in the Beta Ethniki, the match-fixing system that ultimately condemned the club to a return to the Gamma Ethniki grew entrenched, as A.S. Rodos was the sole club that refused to become part of the illicit schemes that later came to light and led Greek football officials to prison.

Due to financial problems and a lack of executives participating in the management of F.C. Rodos, although it finished the championship in 2nd place, it was deducted points and forced to drop to the Delta Ethniki, where it competed in the 2011–12 season. In this championship, the team fell into complete neglect and failed to maintain its place in the division. From 2012 onwards, A.S. Rodos has been a leading contender in the Dodecanese FCA First Division championship, with its primary goal being its return to the country's national divisions.

In the 2015–16 season, it staged a remarkable campaign in the local championships, emerging as champion of the Dodecanese FCA. More specifically, Rodos fielded an impressive squad in the First Division that managed to break every record. In 32 matches played, "the Stags" recorded 30 wins, 1 draw, and 1 defeat against 2nd-placed Antimachos Kos. A.S. Rodos remained undefeated for 30 consecutive matchdays. Additionally, A.S. Rodos scored 134 goals—a record performance for the division—and conceded 17, boasting both the best attack and defense in the championship. As Dodecanese FCA champion, A.S. Rodos participates in the promotion playoffs for the Gamma Ethniki. Its opponents in the 10th Group are Panthiraikos from the Cyclades FCA, Aigeiros Mystegna from the Lesbos FCA, and Poseidon Kardamyla from the Chios FCA. A.S. Rodos literally overwhelms its opponents. It finishes first in its group and is the only team nationwide to achieve a 100% win record, managing to secure the ticket to the Gamma Ethniki first chronologically. At the same time, it records the best offensive performance, scoring 19 goals, which translates to an average of 3.1 goals per match.

For two seasons, 2016–17 and 2017–18, A.S. Rodos remains in the Gamma Ethniki under Avgoustinos Giakai. In the 2018–19 season, returning to the local league, a run of successes begins—initially under the management of Antonis Martinis and Douroutlis—starting a frantic push toward a major comeback. On 13 April 2019, it completes the Dodecanese FCA First Division championship having suffered only two defeats, defeating all opponents along the way with resounding scores.

The 2019–20 season finds A.S. Rodos in the Gamma Ethniki championship (4th tier in the league system). The team makes an exceptional run, recording 18 wins, 2 draws, and 1 defeat, scoring 44 goals while conceding 9. The league's suspension finds the team sitting in 1st place in the standings.

The team's first season in the professional divisions (2020–21) after nearly a decade is considered one of its most successful yet tumultuous. This was because, although A.S. Rodos finished in 3rd place in the championship—securing a ticket to the new two-group Super League Greece 2—it risked relegation at the end of the season due to a serious case regarding the validity of its players' health cards. Relegation ultimately came the following season (2021–22). Despite making a promising start, A.S. Rodos eventually flirted with total dissolution after a disappointing campaign by then-current standards, finishing in 16th and penultimate place in the table with 8 wins, 6 draws, and 18 defeats, alongside a 12-point deduction (6 points for the previous season's fake health cards case and 6 points for overdue financial liabilities).

In the 2022–23 season, A.S. Rodos reorganized following the previous tumultuous years with the clear goal of returning to the professional national divisions, this time building solid foundations. It finished in 2nd place in the standings, missing out by just 3 points on the 1st-place finish that led to the playoffs for promotion to Super League 2. The match against Pangytheatikos on the penultimate matchday, which A.S. Rodos lost 2–1, was one of the key fixtures that determined the champion. The following year (2023–24), A.S. Rodos had a mediocre campaign and finished in mid-table. It had a similar run in the 2024–25 season.

In November 2025, the Hellenic Football Federation announced the expulsion of Rodos from the 2025–26 championship, following three walkover losses (forfeits) in its home matches against AER Afantou, Apollon Kalythies, and Amarynthiakos due to administrative issues.

== Crest and colours ==
Old logo of the team

A.S. Rodos logo is a galloping deer. Its official colours are green and white.

== Rivalries ==
The contest between the teams of Diagoras and A.S. Rodos, exclusively in the sport of association football in which both clubs operate, is known as the Rhodes derby. The two clubs share the same stadium in the city of Rhodes.

== League history ==
- First Division (4): 1978–1980, 1981–1983
- Second Division (15): 1968–1978, 1980–1981, 1983–1985, 2009–2010, 2021–2022
- Third Division (21): 1985–1988, 1989–1990, 1991–1994, 2003–2009, 2010–2011, 2016–2018, 2020–2021, 2022–2026
- Fourth Division (7): 1988–1989, 1990–1991, 1994–1995, 2001–2003, 2011–2012, 2019–2020
- Local Championships (9): 1998–2001, 2012–2016, 2018–2019, 2026–present

== Honours ==
A.S. Rodos honours
Type	Competition	Titles	Winners	Runners-up
Domestic	Beta Ethniki (Second-tier)	2	1977–78, 1980–81	1963–64, 1965–66, 1966–67, 1982–83
Domestic	Gamma Ethniki (Third-tier)	3	2006–07, 2008–09, 2019–20	
Domestic	Delta Ethniki (Fourth-tier)	3	1988–89, 1990–91, 2002–03	
Regional	Dodecanese FCA Championship	3	2000–01, 2015–16, 2018–19	
Regional	Dodecanese FCA Cup	2	1968–69, 1990–91	

- record
- ^{S} Shared record
