= List of Athens Tram stops =

The Athens Tram is a modern tram system that serves the Greek capital of Athens. The current system is operated by STASY, who also manages the Athens Metro, and is part of the Transport for Athens network.

The initial network opened on 19 July 2004, a few weeks prior to the 2004 Summer Olympics in Athens, and was the first since the closure of the original system in October 1960, and the Piraeus-Perama light railway in April 1977. The initial network consisted of three branches, each of them reaching Syntagma to the north, Kolymvitirio to the south, and Stadio Irinis & Filias (SEF) to the west. The system later saw extensions to Asklipiio Voulas in November 2007, Gipedo Karaiskaki in November 2019, and then Agia Triada via the Piraeus loop in December 2021.

Since 18 February 2026, the system consists of 60 tram stops. A majority of the stops are within the South and Central Athens regional units: thirteen are in Piraeus, and one is in Voula, an Athenian suburb in the East Attica regional unit. There are many proposals to extend the Athens Tram, but because many of the stops associated with the proposals are unconfirmed, they are not included here until construction begins.

== Current tram stops ==
Unless indicated, the spelling of the tram stop names on this table, in English and Greek, are according to the signage.

†	Terminal station
#	Interchange station

=== Stops on the Piraeus branch ===
The following is a list of tram stops on the Piraeus branch, from the junction of Poseidonos Avenue and Achilleos to Omiridou Skylitsi, via the Piraeus loop.

Services on this branch were suspended from 16 March 2020 to 21 January 2021, due to realignment works associated with the Faliro Waterfront regeneration project: Tzitzifies, Kallithea and Moschato were also rebuilt during the realignment works.

Stop English	Stop Greek	Image	Opened	Stop type	Interchanges and notes	Coordinates
To Asklipiio Voulas
Batis	Μπάτης		19 July 2004	Side platforms; Reserved track		37.921595°N 23.696225°E
Flisvos	Φλοίσβος		19 July 2004	Side platforms; Reserved track		37.923360°N 23.692890°E
Parko Flisvou	Πάρκο Φλοίσβου		19 July 2004	Side platforms; Reserved track		37.927820°N 23.688380°E
Trocadero	Τροκαντερό		19 July 2004	Side platforms; Reserved track		37.931215°N 23.687140°E
Aghia Skepi	Αγία Σκέπη		19 July 2004	Side platforms; Reserved track		37.933810°N 23.693760°E
Delta Falirou	Δέλτα Φαλήρου		19 July 2004	Island platform; Reserved track		37.937450°N 23.692095°E
Tzitzifies	Τζιτζιφιές		19 July 2004	Island platform; Reserved track		37.940770°N 23.687915°E
Kallithea	Καλλιθέα		19 July 2004	Side platforms; Reserved track	The metro station of the same name is about 2.3 kilometres (1.4 miles) north north-east of the tram stop. Trolley stop Tzitzifies.	37.942610°N 23.684220°E
Moschato	Μοσχάτο		19 July 2004	Side platforms; Reserved track	The metro station of the same name is about 1.2 kilometres (1,300 yards) north of the tram stop.	37.944220°N 23.678130°E
Neo Faliro	Νέο Φάληρο		19 July 2004	Side platforms; Reserved track	The metro station of the same name is about 320 metres (350 yards) west of the tram stop.	37.944565°N 23.668775°E
Gipedo Karaiskaki^{#}	Γήπεδο Καραϊσκάκη		28 November 2019	One-way for trams to Piraeus; Single platform; On-street	Interchange with Athens Metro Line 1 at Faliro, via a pedestrian subway.	37.944410°N 23.664965°E
Mikras Asias	Μικράς Ασίας		15 December 2021	One-way for trams to Piraeus; Single platform; On-street		37.945770°N 23.660180°E
Lambraki	Λαμπράκη		15 December 2021	One-way for trams to Piraeus; Single platform; Reserved track		37.948050°N 23.656155°E
Evangelistria	Ευαγγελίστρια		15 December 2021	One-way for trams to Piraeus; Single platform; Reserved track		37.944955°N 23.653520°E
Plateia Deligianni	Πλατεία Δεληγιάννη		15 December 2021	One-way for trams to Piraeus; Single platform; Reserved track		37.941635°N 23.650670°E
Dimarcheio^{#}	Δημαρχείο		15 December 2021	One-way for trams to Piraeus; Single platform; Reserved track	Interchange with Athens Metro Line 3 at Dimotiko Theatro. The tram stop is named after the nearby town hall of the Piraeus Municipality, and is located between the two halves of Korai Square.	37.942485°N 23.647625°E
Akti Poseidonos^{†}	Ακτή Ποσειδώνος		18 February 2026	Terminus of Line 7; Side platforms; Reserved track	According to STASY, the opening of Akti Poseidonos required the removal of overhead trolleybus wires, despite the intersection of tram and trolleybus wires being common in many cities. Akti Poseidonos is within walking distance of the Port of Piraeus to the south, and Piraeus Tower to the east.	37.944815°N 23.643140°E
Agia Triada^{†}	Αγία Τριάδα		15 December 2021	One-way for trams to Glyfada; Single platform; On-street	Agia Triada is named after the Holy Trinity Cathedral (Greek: Καθεδρικός Ναός Αγίας Τριάδος), and was the terminus of Line 7 from 2021 to 2026. It is located on the right side of Ethiki Antistaseos Street and directly in front of the cathedral, and is within walking distance of Themistokleous Square to the south.	37.944835°N 23.645100°E
Plateia Ippodameias	Πλατεία Ιπποδαμείας		15 December 2021	One-way for trams to Glyfada; Single platform; Reserved track		37.947405°N 23.647450°E
34 Syntagmatos Pezikou (Note: Signed as 34 Synt. Pezikou (Greek: 34ου Συντ. Πεζικού).)	34ου Συντάγματος Πεζικού		15 December 2021	One-way for trams to Glyfada; Single platform; On-street		37.948510°N 23.652060°E
Androutsou	Ανδρούτσου		15 December 2021	One-way for trams to Glyfada; Single platform; On-street		37.947820°N 23.655885°E
Omiridou Skylitsi	Ομηρίδου Σκυλίτση		15 December 2021	One-way for trams to Glyfada; Single platform; On-street		37.945060°N 23.660780°E
Stadio Irinis & Filias–S.E.F.^{#}	Στάδιο Ειρήνης & Φιλίας–Σ.Ε.Φ.		19 July 2004	One-way for trams to Glyfada; Two island platforms; Reserved track	Interchange with Athens Metro Line 1 at Faliro, via a footbridge over Poseidonos Avenue. SEF was the western terminus of the initial network for the 2004 Summer Olympics in Athens. It has a set of crossovers to the east, allowing trams to turn back in case of disruption on the Piraeus loop: the crossovers were also in regular use during SEF's time as a terminus.	37.943780°N 23.664010°E

=== Stops on the Syntagma branch ===
The following is a list of tram stops on the Syntagma branch, from the junction of Poseidonos Avenue and Achilleos to Syntagma.

The branch was cut back to Kassomouli from 19 October 2018 to 20 November 2020, due to concerns over subsidence in the underground riverbed of the Ilisos.

Stop English	Stop Greek	Image	Opened	Stop type	Interchanges and notes	Coordinates
To Agia Triada or Asklipiio Voulas
Mousson	Μουσών		19 July 2004	Island platform; Reserved track	Mousson is named after a residential street, which crosses Achilleos Street at the southern end of this tram stop. To the north, the tram line splits and wrap around the Holy Church of the Dormition of the Mother of God (Greek: Ιερός Ναός Κοιμήσεως Θεοτόκου), which is halfway between this tram stop and Panaghitsa.	37.922105°N 23.699845°E
Panaghitsa	Παναγίτσα		19 July 2004	Island platform; Reserved track		37.925070°N 23.701785°E
Amfitheas	Αμφιθέας		19 July 2004	Island platform; Staggered platforms; Reserved track	Amfitheas is located at the junction of Achilleos Street and Dimokratias Street: the northbound platform is on the eastern side, and the southbound platform to the west.	37.928170°N 23.705490°E
Achilleos	Αχιλλέως		19 July 2004	Island platform; Reserved track		37.929870°N 23.709835°E
Evangeliki Scholi	Ευαγγελική Σχολή		19 July 2004	Island platform; Reserved track		37.933070°N 23.710810°E
Medeas–Mykalis	Μηδείας–Μυκάλης		19 July 2004	Island platform; Reserved track		37.936900°N 23.712015°E
Aghia Paraskevi	Αγία Παρασκευή		19 July 2004	Island platform; Reserved track	Aghia Paraskevi is named after a Greek Orthodox church to the south, halfway between this tram stop and Medeas–Mykalis: the unrelated metro station of the same name is about 12.2 kilometres (7.6 miles) north east of the tram stop.	37.940005°N 23.712990°E
Megalou Alexandrou	Μεγάλου Αλεξάνδρου		19 July 2004	Island platform; Reserved track		37.942775°N 23.713860°E
Aghias Fotinis–Platia	Αγίας Φωτεινής–Πλατεία		19 July 2004	Island platform; Reserved track	Nea Smyrni	37.946530°N 23.715015°E
Aegeou	Αιγαίου		19 July 2004	Island platform; Reserved track		37.950145°N 23.719050°E
Baknana	Μπακνανά		19 July 2004	Island platform; Reserved track		37.954465°N 23.723780°E
Neos Kosmos^{#} Northbound	Νέος Κόσμος; Βόρεια		19 July 2004	Staggered platforms; On-street	Interchange with Athens Metro Line 2. Although Neos Kosmos' platforms are about 93 metres (102 yards) apart, the southbound platform is on Gouveli Street, while the northbound platform is on Kasomouli Street.	37.957830°N 23.727225°E
Neos Kosmos^{#} Southbound	Νέος Κόσμος; Νότια		19 July 2004	Staggered platforms; On-street	Interchange with Athens Metro Line 2. Although Neos Kosmos' platforms are about 93 metres (102 yards) apart, the southbound platform is on Gouveli Street, while the northbound platform is on Kasomouli Street.	37.957005°N 23.727085°E
Kassomouli	Κασομούλη		19 July 2004	Side platforms; Reserved track		37.960200°N 23.723470°E
Fix^{#}	Φίξ		19 July 2004	Side platforms; Reserved track	Interchange with Athens Metro Line 2 at Syngrou–Fix. The stop is located on the northeastern side of the road junction with Kallirois Avenue and Irakleous Street.	37.964555°N 23.727430°E
Leoforos Vouliagmenis	Λεωφόρος Βουλιαγμένης		19 July 2004	Island platform; Reserved track	Leoforos Vouliagmenis was the northern terminus for Tram Lines 1 and 2, during the Olympic Games and until early-2005. The stop is located about 200 metres (220 yards) west of Vouliagmenis Avenue in the Neos Kosmos neighbourhood, at the junction with Kallirois Avenue and Vourvachi Street. There is a single crossover to the south of the tram stop, which allows trams to turn back in case of disruption.	37.966520°N 23.731645°E
Zappio	Ζάππειο		19 July 2004	Side platforms; On-street	Zappio's platforms used to be about 164 metres (179 yards) apart, with the southbound platform on Vasilissis Olgas Avenue, in front of the Zappeion, and the northbound platform on Ardittou Avenue (at coordinates 37.968630°N 23.737915°E). On 15 May 2026, both platforms were merged into a single tram stop at Vasilissis Olgas Avenue: the tram stop is within walking distance of both the Zappeion and the Panathenaic Stadium.	37.969325°N 23.736270°E
Syntagma^{†#}	Σύνταγμα		19 July 2004	Terminus of Line 6; Island platform; Reserved track	Interchange with Athens Metro Lines 2 and 3. Syntagma was the northern terminus of the initial network for the 2004 Summer Olympics in Athens: the tram stop was a single-track terminus and a side platform until 10 December 2018, and reopened on 14 March 2018 with a dual-track layout and an island platform.	37.974505°N 23.735370°E

=== Stops on the Glyfada branch ===
The following is a list of tram stops on the Glyfada branch, from the junction of Poseidonos Avenue and Achilleos to Asklipiio Voulas: tram stops between Edem and Kentro Istioploias are located west of Poseidonos Avenue.

Stop English	Stop Greek	Image	Opened	Stop type	Interchanges and notes	Coordinates
To Agia Triada or Syntagma
Edem	Έδεμ		19 July 2004	Side platforms; Reserved track	Edem is located about 100 metres (110 yards) north of the Pikrodafni stream, and next to a local beach of the same name (Greek: Παραλία Εδέμ).	37.918560°N 23.700750°E
Pikrodafni^{†}	Πικροδάφνη		19 July 2004	Terminus of Line 6; Two island platforms; Reserved track	Line 6 (from Syntagma) terminates on the middle track, while Line 7 (from Agia Triada and Asklepieio Voulas) uses the outer tracks.	37.915770°N 23.705615°E
Marina Alimou	Μαρίνα Αλίμου		19 July 2004	Side platforms; Reserved track		37.913120°N 23.708605°E
Kalamaki	Καλαμάκι		19 July 2004	Side platforms; Reserved track		37.909560°N 23.713045°E
Zefyros	Ζέφυρος		19 July 2004	Side platforms; Reserved track		37.906535°N 23.716890°E
Loutra Alimou	Λουτρά Αλίμου		19 July 2004	Side platforms; Reserved track		37.902360°N 23.719530°E
Elliniko	Ελληνικό		19 July 2004	Side platforms; Reserved track	Elliniko is named after the former airport: the metro station of the same name is about 2.4 kilometres (1.5 miles) east of the tram stop.	37.897370°N 23.720225°E
1st Aghiou Kosma	1η Αγίου Κοσμά		19 July 2004	Side platforms; Reserved track		37.894400°N 23.721115°E
2nd Aghiou Kosma	2η Αγίου Κοσμά		19 July 2004	Side platforms; Reserved track		37.890865°N 23.723105°E
Aghios Alexandros	Άγιος Αλέξανδρος		19 July 2004	Side platforms; Reserved track		37.885115°N 23.726855°E
Ellinon Olymbionikon	Ελλήνων Ολυμπιονικών		19 July 2004	Side platforms; Reserved track		37.880970°N 23.729550°E
Kentro Istioploias	Κέντρο Ιστιοπλοΐας		19 July 2004	Side platforms; Reserved track		37.875760°N 23.731905°E
Platia Vergoti	Πλατεία Βεργωτή		19 July 2004	Side platforms; Reserved track		37.871556°N 23.735055°E
Paralia Glyfadas	Παραλία Γλυφάδας		19 July 2004	Side platforms; Reserved track		37.867640°N 23.738585°E
Paleo Demarhio	Παλαιό Δημαρχείο		19 July 2004	Side platforms; Reserved track		37.864545°N 23.743370°E
Platia Vaso Katraki	Πλατεία Βάσω Κατράκη		19 July 2004	Side platforms; Reserved track		37.863410°N 23.747320°E
Aghelou Metaxa	Άγγελου Μεταξά		19 July 2004	Island platform; Reserved track		37.862770°N 23.751175°E
Platia Esperidon	Πλατεία Εσπερίδων		19 July 2004	Island platform; Reserved track		37.860205°N 23.754140°E
Kolymvitirio	Κολυμβητήριο		19 July 2004	Island platform; Reserved track	Kolymvitirio was the southern terminus of the initial network for the 2004 Summer Olympics in Athens. Named after a local swimming pool, the tram stop is located on the central reservation of Dimarchou Angelou Mextaxa, and serves a residential area in Glyfada. There is a crossover to the south of the tram stop, which allows trams to turn back in case of disruption at Asklepieio Voulas: the crossover was in regular use when Kolymvitirio was the terminus.	37.856195°N 23.754320°E
Asklipiio Voulas^{†}	Ασκληπιείο Βούλας		15 November 2007	Terminus of Line 7; Two island platforms; Reserved track	Asklepieio Voulas is the only tram stop in the East Attica regional unit. The tram stop is located west of Konstantinou Karamanli Avenue, and is named after a nearby hospital.	37.849745°N 23.752510°E

== See also ==
- Rolling stock section of Athens tram
- List of Athens Metro stations
