= Drapetsona =

Drapetsona Δραπετσώνα
- Municipal unit
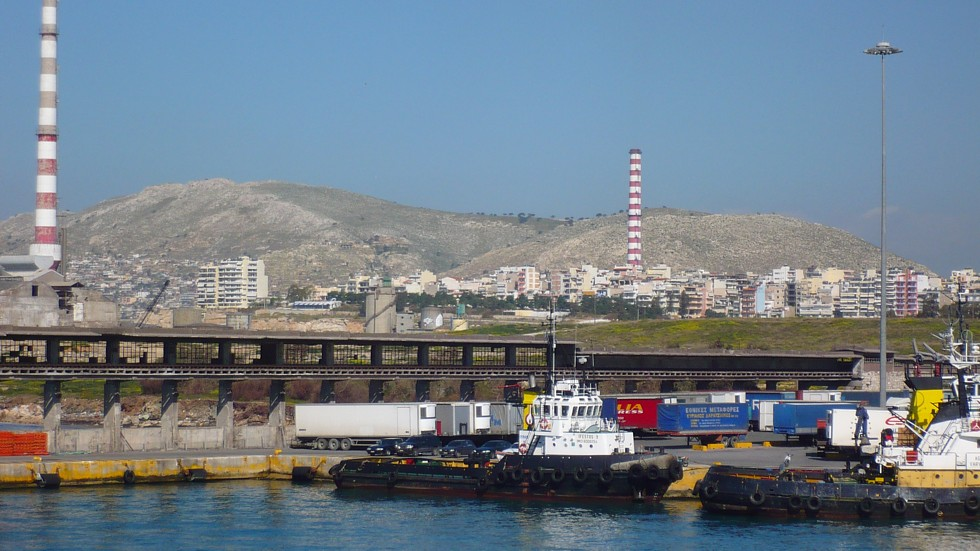
- Port of Drapetsona

- Location within the regional unit

- Location within Greece
- Coordinates: 37°56.8′N 23°37.5′E
- Country: Greece
- Administrative region: Attica
- Regional unit: Piraeus
- Municipality: Keratsini-Drapetsona

Area
  - Municipal unit: 1.725 km^{2} (0.666 sq mi)
- Elevation: 20 m (66 ft)

Population (2021)
  - Municipal unit: 13,815
  - Municipal unit density: 8,009/km^{2} (20,740/sq mi)
- Time zone: UTC+2 (EET)
  - Summer (DST): UTC+3 (EEST)
- Postal code: 186 xx
- Area code: 210
- Vehicle registration: Z

Drapetsona (Greek: Δραπετσώνα) is a coastal town, a suburb and a former municipality in the southwestern part of the Piraeus regional unit in the Athens Urban Area. Since the 2011 local government reform, it is part of the municipality Keratsini-Drapetsona, of which it is a municipal unit.

== Geography ==
Drapetsona is situated on the north side of the inlet to the Port of Piraeus. The northwestern part of the port is on the territory of Drapetsona. Drapetsona lies 2 km west of Piraeus, and 10 km southwest of Athens city centre. The municipal unit has an area of 1.725 km^{2}. Its built-up area is continuous with those of neighbouring cities of Piraeus and Keratsini.

== History ==
In 1805 the first church, Saint Dionysios was built. In the 1830s Drapetsona was constituted of people who moved from Greek islands and settled near Saint Dionysios church in the area called Vourla. In 1834 a part of the region was given to Piraeus in order to become a cemetery under the term of churches’ reconstruction. Also a great number of brothels was established in 1873 to the west of Saint Dionysios. After the 1922 Asia Minor Catastrophe there was a notable population increase.

Drapetsona was part of the municipality of Piraeus until 1950, when it became a separate community. It was elevated to municipality status in 1951.

Since 19th century Drapetsona has become an important part of the Piraeus industrial area. The first major port facility was the Vasileiadis Shipyard, founded in 1898. Subsequently, other industries were established: a fertilizer factory, a plaster factory, a cement factory, a tannery and more recently installations of petroleum companies (Shell, Mobil, BP).

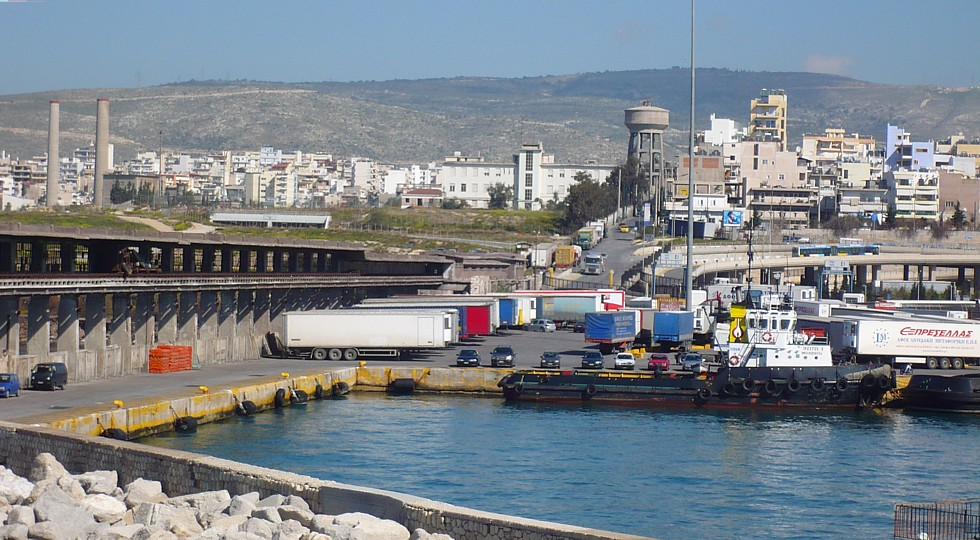
Drapetsona

There are plans to redevelop a 64 hectares (160 acres) section of the Drapetsona seafront on the Saronic Gulf, the location of the former Greek Company of Chemicals and Fertilisers industrial complex, including the now abandoned Kanellopoulos Institute of Chemistry and Agriculture. The plans call for utilisation of the area for tourism, business and water sports, including a maritime business centre, a convention centre, a technology museum and two marinas.

"Drapetsona" is also the subject of a popular rebetiko song performed by folk singer Grigoris Bithikotsis in 1961 (Politia Vol.1).

== Historical population ==
Year	Municipality
1981	14,767
1991	13,094
2001	13,399
2011	13,968
2021	13,815
