= Athens Tram =

Public tram network in Athens

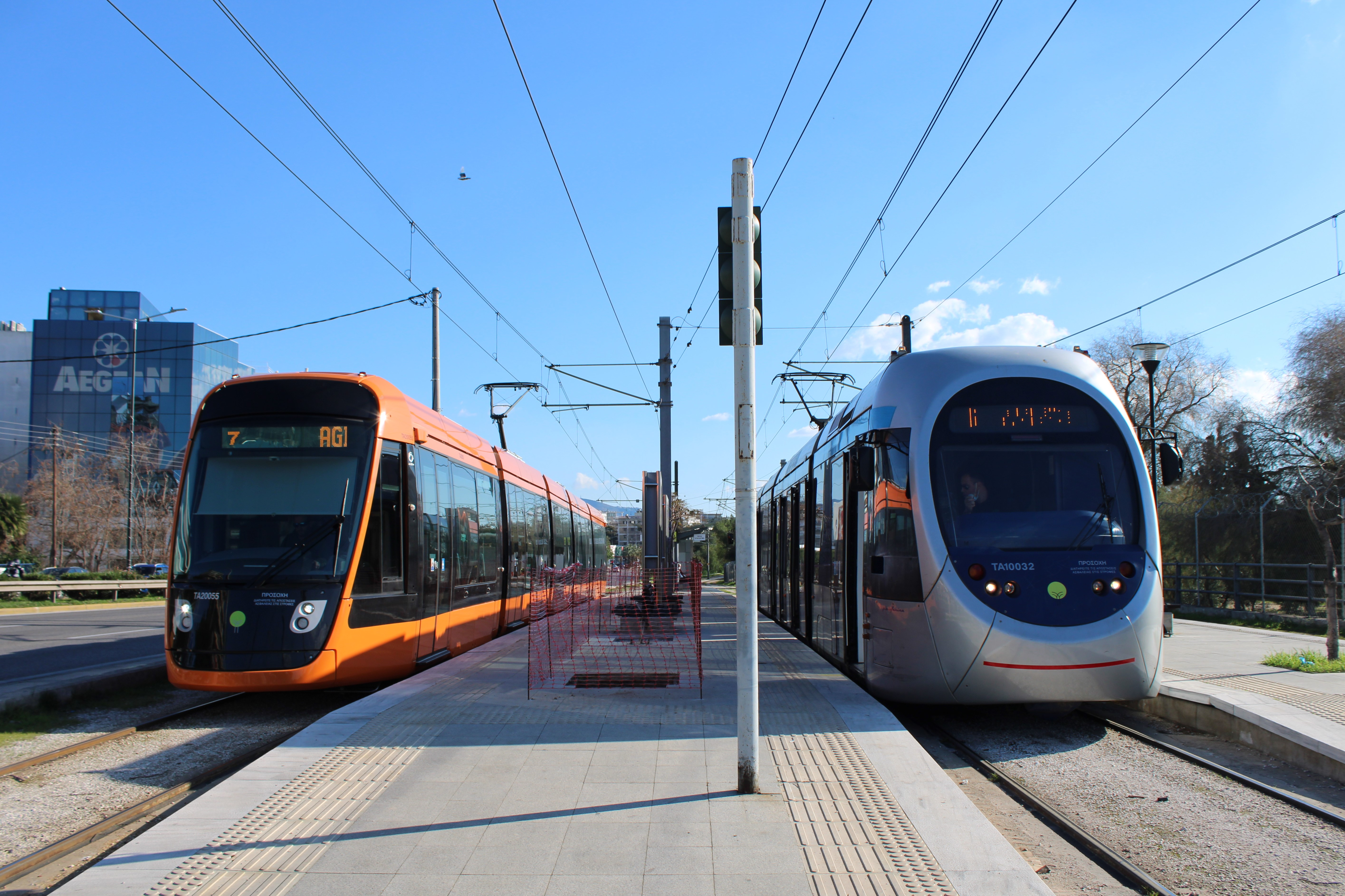
- Sirio and Citadis trams at Pikrodafni tram stop

Overview
- Native name: Τραμ Αθήνας
- Area served: Central Athens, South Athens, Piraeus, Voula
- Locale: Greater Athens
- Transit type: Tram
- Number of lines: 2
- Number of stops: 60
- Website: Official website

Operation
- Began operation: 19 July 2004; 22 years ago
- Operator: STASY
- Number of vehicles: 35 AnsaldoBreda Sirio; 25 Alstom Citadis 305

Technical
- System length: 31.3 km (19.4 mi)
- Track gauge: 1,435 mm (4 ft 8 1/2 in) standard gauge
- Electrification: 750 V DC overhead line
- Average speed: 22 km/h (14 mph)
- Top speed: 70 km/h (43 mph)

The Athens Tram is the modern public tram network system serving Athens, Greece. The system is owned and operated by STASY, which replaced Tram S.A. in June 2011.

STASY operates a fleet of 25 Alstom Citadis and 35 Sirio vehicles, which serve two tram lines and 60 stops. The tram network spans a total length of 27 kilometres (16.8 mi) throughout ten Athenian suburbs. This network runs from Syntagma (central Athens) to the coastal suburb of Palaio Faliro, where the line splits in two branches: the first ends as soon as it meets the Athens coastline at Pikrodafni Station (where it meets the other line), while the other exclusively runs between the Athens riviera (toward the southern suburb of Voula) and the port of Piraeus. The network covers the majority of the city's Saronic Gulf coastline. Athens' tram system provides average daily service to 65,000 passengers, and employs 345 people.

== History ==
=== Old tram networks (1908-1960) ===
Athens Tram began its operations in 1882 with horse tramways. After 1908, the metre gauge tram network was electrified and was extended to 21 lines. The original Athens tram system ceased operations in 1960 and was replaced by trolleybuses and motorbuses. A standard gauge tram system was built by the Hellenic Electric Railways, from the perimeter of the Piraeus Harbour to Perama.

=== Modern tram system ===
In March 2001, Tram S.A. was established as a public utility company under the supervision of the Ministry of Transport and Communications, as a subsidiary company of Attiko Metro S.A., the state company which developed the Athens Metro network. The company started the construction of the initial network in the beginning of 2002, and was opened by Michalis Liapis (Minister for Transport and Communications) on 19 July 2004, a few weeks prior to the 2004 Summer Olympics in Athens. The construction of the tram network was financed by the Third European Regional Development Fund and Greek state funds.

In March 2011, the Greek Government passed Law 3920 to allow the Athens–Piraeus Electric Railways and Tram S.A. to be absorbed by AMEL. The resulting company was renamed STASY S.A. (Greek: ΣΤΑΣΥ Α.Ε.) and is a subsidiary of OASA S.A. The merger was officially announced on 10 June 2011.

From 19 October 2018 to 20 November 2020, tram services were suspended between Syntagma and Kasomouli, due to concerns over subsidence in the underground riverbed of the Ilisos: services from Stadio Irinis & Filias to Edem and Mousson were also suspended from 16 March 2020 to 21 January 2021, due to realignment works associated with the Faliro Waterfront regeneration project.

=== Extensions ===
The first extension of the Athens Tram, consisting of a single-stop 700-metre (2,300 ft) line from Kolymvitirio to Asklepieio Voulas in North Voula, opened on 15 November 2007.

The second extension consists of a one-way loop from Stadio Irinis & Filias to Akti Poseidonos, along with twelve new stops: construction work started in 2013, and the first test run of the extension took place on 7 February 2019. From 28 November 2019, trams heading towards Faliro terminated at Gipedo Karaiskaki instead of Stadio Irinis & Filias, before running out of service towards Agia Triada: the loop opened to the public on 15 December 2021, with Agia Triada as the provisional terminus for Line 7.

The final terminus of the extension, Akti Poseidonos, opened on 18 February 2026: according to STASY, the opening of Akti Poseidonos required the removal of overhead trolleybus wires, despite the intersection of tram and trolleybus wires being common in many cities.

In the early 2000s there was proposal for the tram lines to be extended towards Keratsini, Perama and Salamina. With a large part of the lines being underground, especially in Keratsini. With around an estimated 8,9 km the cost was expected to be around 180 million euros. But in 2018 a combined backlash by both local organisations and municipal governments halted the aforementioned plans, with now a new metro line being suggested instead.

== Ticketing policy ==
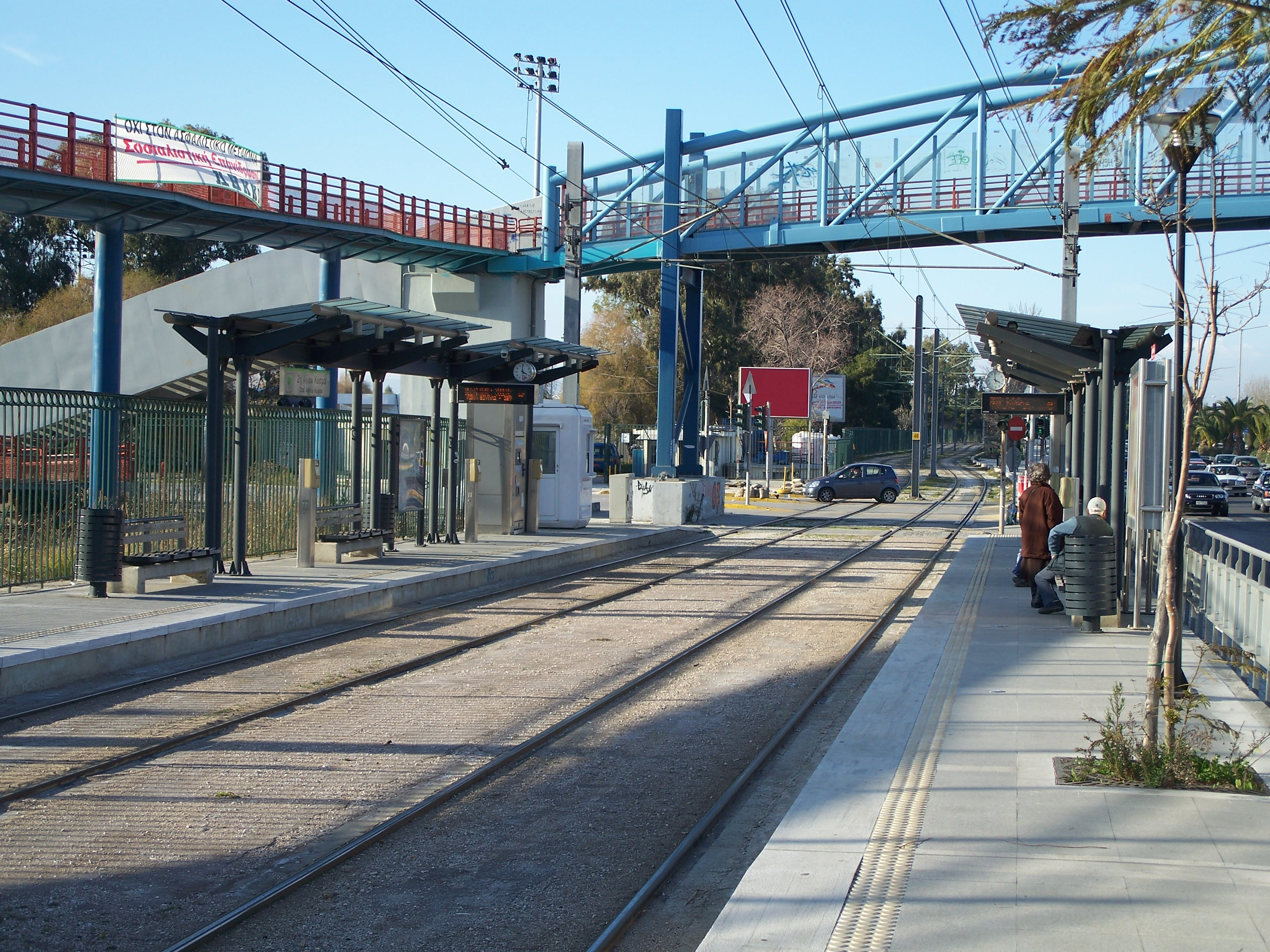
Typical tram station

Ticket counters and automatic ticket machines with touch screens are available in some of the stations.

Purchased tickets are valid for 90 minutes (1 hour 30 minutes) after validation and can be used for several rides for all means of public transport in Athens including the metro, buses, and the urban part of the suburban railway (between Piraeus, Magoula and Koropi stations, excluding the airport). Passengers must validate their tickets at the electronic validating machines inside the tram vehicle at the start of their ride. The normal adult flat fare is €1.20 (valid for 90 minutes).

There are daily and weekly tickets, as well as monthly cards which also apply for all means of public transport in Athens. Fares are checked frequently; passengers who fail to show a validated ticket or a monthly card are penalised by a fine of 60 times the price of a standard ticket.

Children under 6, the handicapped, and persons currently enlisted in the military are eligible for free transportation.

== Network ==
=== Current routes ===
The Athens Tram currently consists of two routes, Lines 6 and 7:

- Line 6 starts at Syntagma Square in Central Athens, and runs south west towards the coast, before turning south east at the junction of Poseidonos Avenue and Achilleos towards Pikrodafni in Kalamaki.
- Line 7 starts at Asklepieio Voulas in Voula, running north west along the coast towards Akti Poseidonos in Piraeus, operating in a one-way loop west of Neo Faliro.

Lines 6 and 7 (also known occasionally as T6 and T7 respectively) were introduced on 6 December 2021, replacing Lines 3, 4 and 5. Line 7 was extended from Stadio Irinis & Filias to Agia Triada on 15 December the same year. The two lines share tram tracks from Pikrodafni to the junction of Poseidonos Avenue and Achilleos.

Athens Tram routes
Line	Colour^{a}	Opening date	Last extended	Length	Route	Stops
Athens Tram Line 6	Green	2004	2004	18.2 km (11.3 mi)	Syntagma – Pikrodafni	19
Athens Tram Line 7	Green	2004	2026	16.1 km (10.0 mi)	Akti Poseidonos – Asklepieio Voulas	43

=== Former routes ===
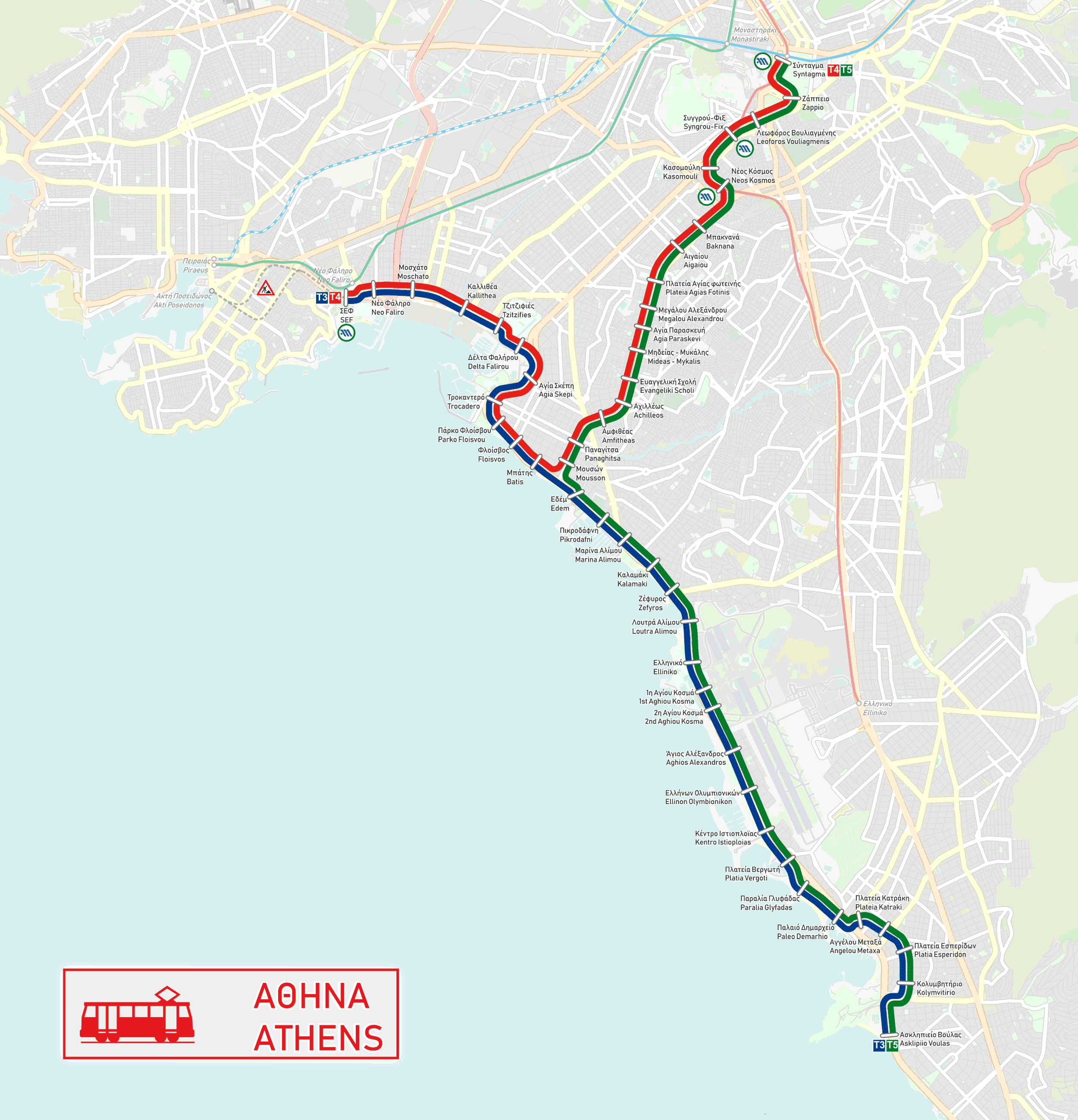
Route map showing the three original Athens Tram lines.

The present Athens Tram opened with five lines, which were named after ancient Greeks: Aristophanes (Line 1), Aeschylus (Line 2), Thucydides (Line 3), Aristotle (Line 4), and Plato (Line 5). Line 3 ran between Stadio Irinis & Filias (SEF) and Kolymvitirio, Line 4 ran between Syntagma and SEF, and Line 5 ran between Syntagma and Kolymvitirio. Lines 1 and 2 were shortened versions of Lines 4 and 5 respectively, terminating at Leoforos Vouliagmenis instead of Syntagma: Lines 1 and 2 were discontinued in early-2005.

Lines 3 and 5 were extended to Asklepieio Voulas on 15 November 2007. From 28 November 2019, westbound trams of Lines 3 and 4 terminated at Gipedo Karaiskaki instead of Stadio Irinis & Filias.

Former Athens Tram routes
Line	Colour (Note: As of October 2012, none of the organisations behind the construction or operation of the Athens Metro specify the exact line colour values for web or print, but they agree on a general colour scheme for identifying lines.)	Opening date	Last extended	Length	Route	Stops
Athens Tram Line 1	Red	2004	—N/a	18.0 km (11.2 mi)	Stadio Irinis & Filias – Leoforos Vouliagmenis	26
Athens Tram Line 2	Green	2004	—N/a	16.6 km (10.3 mi)	Leoforos Vouliagmenis – Kolymvitirio	35
Athens Tram Line 3	Blue	2004	2007	21.5 km (13.4 mi)	Stadio Irinis & Filias – Asklepieio Voulas	31
Athens Tram Line 4	Red	2004	—N/a	19.6 km (12.2 mi)	Stadio Irinis & Filias – Syntagma	28
Athens Tram Line 5	Green	2004	2007	18.2 km (11.3 mi)	Syntagma – Asklepieio Voulas	37

=== Stops ===
Since February 2026, the system consists of 60 tram stops. A majority of the stops are within the South and Central Athens regional units: thirteen are in Piraeus, and one is in Voula.

== Rolling stock ==
The Athens Tram opened in 2004 with 35 Sirio trams from AnsaldoBreda. To support the extension of the system into the centre of Piraeus, an order was placed in July 2018 for 25 Alstom Citadis 305 trams, delivery of which began in September 2020 and ended in December 2021. The tram depot is in Elliniko.

Athens Tram rolling stock
Year built	Manufacturer	Model	Image	Length	Quantity	Ref(s).
2004	AnsaldoBreda	Sirio		31.9 m (105 ft)	35	
2020–2021	Alstom	Citadis 305		33 m (108 ft)	25	

== See also ==
- Transport for Athens
- Piraeus-Perama light railway
- Railway Museum of Athens
- List of rapid transit systems
