= Moschato =

Moschato Μοσχάτο
- Municipal unit
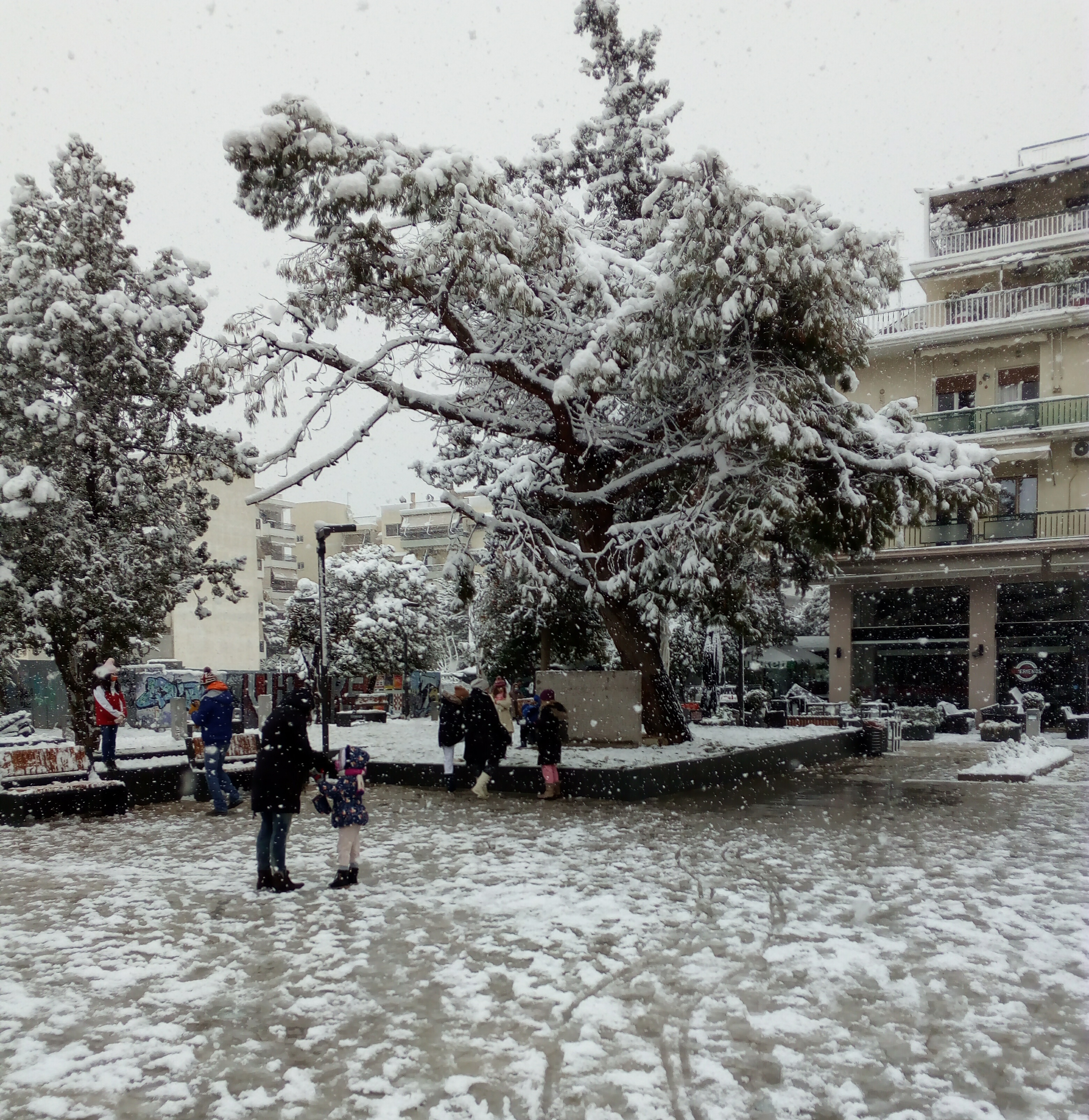
- View of the central square (2021)

- Location within Athens

- Location within Greece
- Coordinates: 37°57′N 23°40′E
- Country: Greece
- Administrative region: Attica
- Regional unit: South Athens
- Municipality: Moschato-Tavros

Area
  - Municipal unit: 2.325 km^{2} (0.898 sq mi)
- Elevation: 10 m (33 ft)

Population (2021)
  - Municipal unit: 25,322
  - Municipal unit density: 10,890/km^{2} (28,210/sq mi)
- Time zone: UTC+2 (EET)
  - Summer (DST): UTC+3 (EEST)
- Postal code: 183 xx
- Area code: 210
- Vehicle registration: Z
- Website: www.dimosmoschatou.gr

Moschato (Greek: Μοσχάτο, romanized: Moskháto) is a town and a suburb in the southwestern part of the Athens agglomeration, Greece. Since the 2011 local government reform it is part of the municipality Moschato-Tavros, of which it is the seat and a municipal unit.

== Geography ==
Moschato is situated on the Phaleron Bay coast, east of the mouth of the river Cephissus. The municipal unit has an area of 2.325 km^{2}. It is 6 km southwest of Athens city centre and 3 km east of Piraeus. The southern end of the A1 motorway (Athens–Thessaloniki–Evzonoi) is in Moschato. Other important roads are Poseidonos Avenue along the coast and Peiraios Street in the north. The main squares of Moschato are Metamorfoseos Sotiros Square on Makrygianni Avenue, with the eponymous church, and Iroon Polytechneiou Square with the City Hall.

=== Climate ===
Moschato which is located in the Athens Riviera, has a hot semi-arid climate. It has mild winters and hot summers, with particularly warm summer nights.

Climate data for Moschato 20 m a.s.l.
Month	Jan	Feb	Mar	Apr	May	Jun	Jul	Aug	Sep	Oct	Nov	Dec	Year
Record high °C (°F)	21.1 (70.0)	20.8 (69.4)	25.0 (77.0)	28.9 (84.0)	29.9 (85.8)	35.8 (96.4)	39.7 (103.5)	38.3 (100.9)	33.7 (92.7)	31.4 (88.5)	27.1 (80.8)	22.3 (72.1)	39.7 (103.5)
Mean daily maximum °C (°F)	16.0 (60.8)	16.3 (61.3)	17.5 (63.5)	20.7 (69.3)	24.9 (76.8)	30.8 (87.4)	34.9 (94.8)	33.5 (92.3)	29.4 (84.9)	25.8 (78.4)	22.0 (71.6)	18.7 (65.7)	24.2 (75.6)
Daily mean °C (°F)	12.7 (54.9)	12.6 (54.7)	13.7 (56.7)	17.2 (63.0)	21.2 (70.2)	27.0 (80.6)	30.9 (87.6)	30.0 (86.0)	25.7 (78.3)	22.0 (71.6)	18.2 (64.8)	15.1 (59.2)	20.5 (69.0)
Mean daily minimum °C (°F)	9.4 (48.9)	8.9 (48.0)	9.9 (49.8)	13.7 (56.7)	17.5 (63.5)	23.1 (73.6)	26.9 (80.4)	26.4 (79.5)	22.0 (71.6)	18.1 (64.6)	14.4 (57.9)	11.5 (52.7)	16.8 (62.3)
Record low °C (°F)	3.7 (38.7)	0.7 (33.3)	1.3 (34.3)	10.3 (50.5)	13.3 (55.9)	17.7 (63.9)	19.8 (67.6)	20.7 (69.3)	14.8 (58.6)	13.8 (56.8)	6.3 (43.3)	6.0 (42.8)	0.7 (33.3)
Average rainfall mm (inches)	57.4 (2.26)	28.6 (1.13)	24.9 (0.98)	9.9 (0.39)	13.8 (0.54)	18.6 (0.73)	2.2 (0.09)	9.7 (0.38)	71.2 (2.80)	5.1 (0.20)	32.9 (1.30)	39.2 (1.54)	313.5 (12.34)
Source 1: National Observatory of Athens Monthly Bulletins (Mar 2022 - Mar 2024)
Source 2: Moschato N.O.A station

== Transport ==
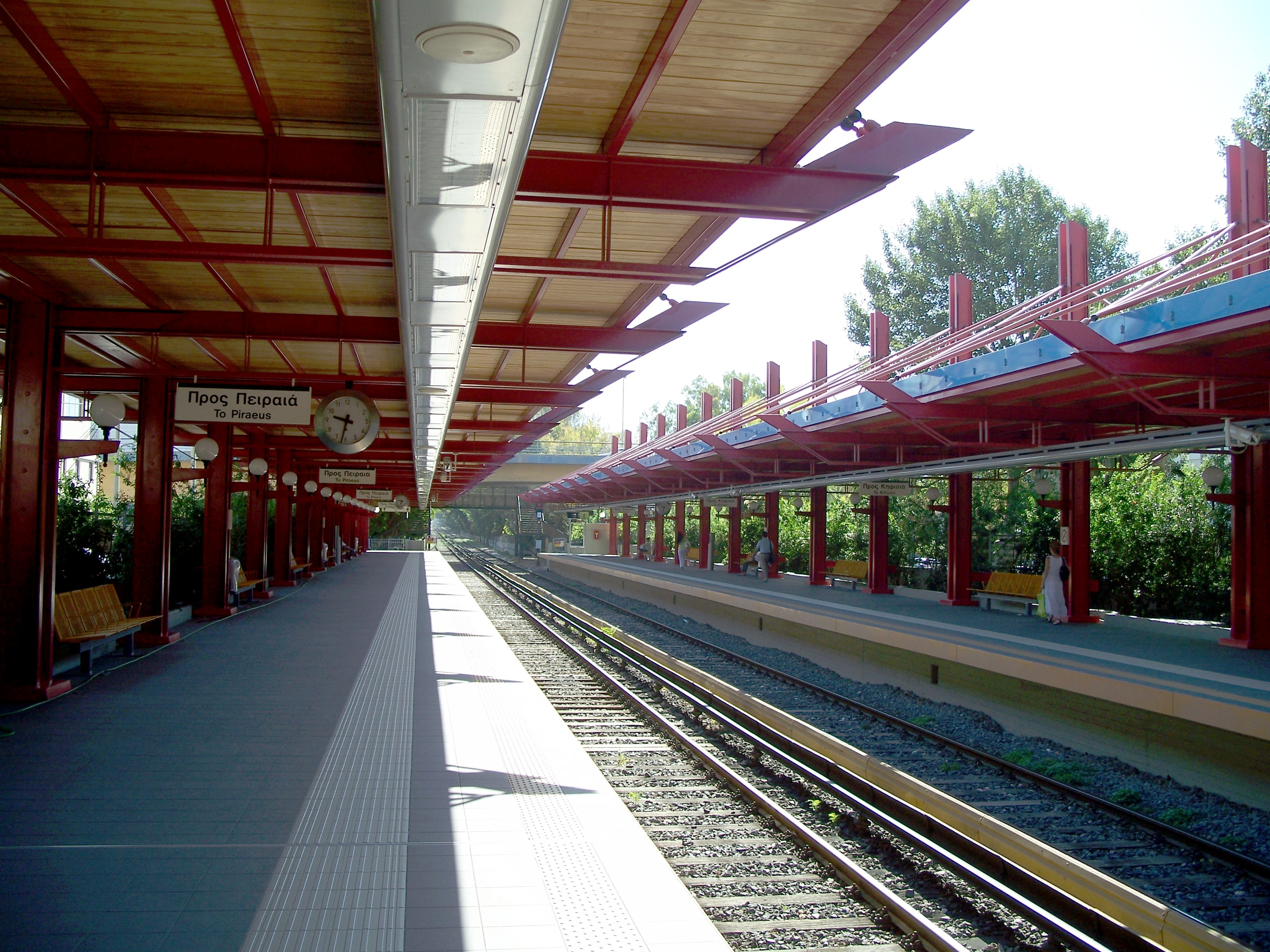
Moschato metro station

The Moschato metro station is served by Athens Metro Line 1, which connects it with Piraeus and central Athens. Moschato is also served by the Athens Tram network, and by the bus routes 1 (trolley), 914, 860, 229, 217, 101, B1, 500, 130, 049, 040, 232, 218, 0420 and A1. The routes 860, 500, 1 and 218 go only in the city centre the other just pass through Poseidononos and Pireaus ave.

== Culture ==
The local fair is held on 6 August every year, festivities starting from the 5th, when the cathedral of Aghia Sotira (Our Christ Saviour) has its religious holiday.

Moschato is known for its Carnival celebrations held every year approximately two weeks before Clean Monday (Kathara Deytera). Festivities for all ages are held throughout the town and more specific at the Tent (Tenta) that the municipal puts up at the Korai Str. square. Delegations from many cities across Greece as well as foreign communities take part in this two week festivity. Teenagers have the opportunity to take part in a large Treasure/Scavenger Hunt (Kinigi tou Chamenou Thisavrou) which takes place in all of Moschato and lasts for the entire two weeks, engaging into games, singing contests, citywide treasure hunts, masquerade competitions and with the chance of winning prizes, trips, and many other gifts.

== Historical population ==
Year	Population
1941	12,913
1981	21,138
1991	22,039
2001	23,153
2011	25,441
2021	25,322
