= Moschato metro station =

Athens Metro station

Μοσχάτο Moschato
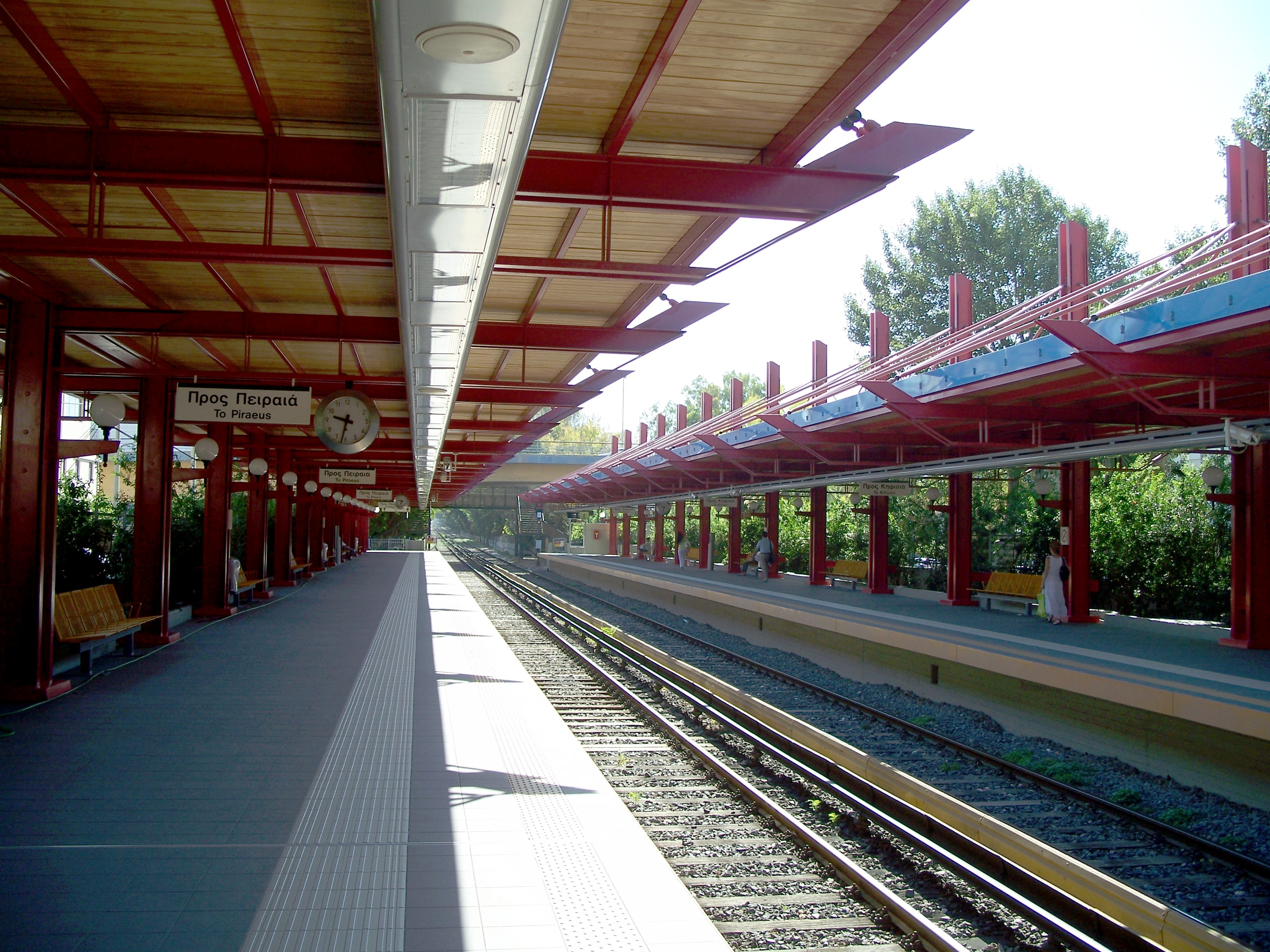
- Station platform

General information
- Location: 183 45 Moschato; Greece
- Coordinates: 37.955250°N 23.680465°E
- Manager: STASY
- Line: Athens Metro Line 1
- Platforms: 2
- Tracks: 2

Construction
- Structure type: At-grade
- Accessible: Yes

Key dates
- 27 February 1869: Line opened
- 9 August 1882: Station opened
- 13 June 2003: Station rebuilt

Services
Preceding station	Athens Metro	Following station
Faliro towards Piraeus	Line 1	Kallithea towards Kifissia
Location

Moschato (Greek: Μοσχάτο) is on the Athens Metro Line 1, located in the municipality of Moschato-Tavros in the regional unit of South Athens, Attica, Greece. It is marked at the 3.982 km from the starting point in Piraeus station of Line 1. The station was opened in 1882 and was renovated in 2003, it features two platforms.

== History ==
The station was opened in 1880 by SAP. Originally its location was just west of today, at the point where even today we can see the old low stone dock on the side towards Kifissia. At that time, the bridge of Chrysostomos Smyrna did not yet exist, while Str. Makrigianni was of course two-way. Makrygianni still has a small pedestrian section today, which continues north of the station and exits in Piraeus. So in those years, since Chrysostomou Smyrnis did not go out to Piraeus and was not used as an ascent/descent pair with Makrygianni, the entire connection of Moschato with Piraeus in both directions was made from Makrygianni, which crossed the train tracks vertically with a level crossing (since the line was still steam powered).

So the station was built right next to this crossing to Piraeus and initially it was only the simple stone platform that we still see today, since Moschato was very sparsely populated. It was even optional for all the years of steam propulsion, while even after electrification not all trains stopped. The trains stopping had a large sign reading «Muscat», while those passing it had «Muscat» with a deletion. The station was placed where it still stands today in 1904, when the line was electrified and all level crossings were replaced by bridges.

Makrygianni was of course still two-way and connected to Piraeus, but the bridge built over the lines needed some space to reach the appropriate height and thus a P-type layout was used, similar to the current bridge of the Neratziotissa church in Marousi.

Finally, in the 1930s all trains begin to stop in Moschato, since the surrounding area is rapidly being rebuilt. In 1977, Makrygianni/Chrys. Smyrnis were finally one-way and the bridge that circled the station was demolished, because even as a one-way station, it was judged to be too narrow for the needs of the time and impractical. It is decided to build a new two-way one at the height of Chrys. Smyrna (completed in 1980) and those heading to Poseidonos to use Korai Street to get out to Makrygianni. With the demolition of the bridge, the station is also rebuilt, which now has the entire space to be developed.

The current format of the station dates back to 2003, with the opening on June 26, as the then ISAP carried out upgrading works for all the stations of line 1 in view of the 2004 Olympic games. Moschato station was completely renovated, with new docks and copper canopies, creation of two additional entrances and new areas for staff.

== Station Layout ==
L1
Mezzanine
Overpass between platforms
G
- Customer service
- Tickets
- Entry/Exit
Side platform
Westbound
← towards Piraeus (Faliro)
Eastbound
towards Kifissia (Kallithea) →
Side platform
