= Agios Ioannis Renti =

Agios Ioannis Renti Άγιος Ιωάννης Ρέντη
- Municipal unit
- Location within the regional unit

- Location within Greece
- Coordinates: 37°58′N 23°40′E
- Country: Greece
- Administrative region: Attica
- Regional unit: Piraeus
- Municipality: Nikaia-Agios Ioannis Renti

Area
  - Municipal unit: 4.524 km^{2} (1.747 sq mi)
- Elevation: 10 m (33 ft)

Population (2021)
  - Municipal unit: 15,411
  - Municipal unit density: 3,406/km^{2} (8,823/sq mi)
- Time zone: UTC+2 (EET)
  - Summer (DST): UTC+3 (EEST)
- Postal code: 182 xx
- Area code: 21
- Website: www.nikaia-rentis.gov.gr

Agios Ioannis Renti (Greek: Άγιος Ιωάννης Ρέντη) is a suburb and a former municipality in the Piraeus regional unit, lying in the western part of the Athens agglomeration in Greece. Since the 2011 local government reform it is part of the municipality Nikaia-Agios Ioannis Renti, of which it is a municipal unit.

== Geography ==
Agios Ioannis Renti is part of Piraeus regional unit, part of Athens urban area, located about 4.5 km (3 mi) west of central Athens and 4 km (2 mi) northeast of Piraeus. The municipal unit has an area of 4.524 km^{2}. The small river Cephissus runs through it. Two important transport axes pass through the municipality: the A1 motorway (Athens–Thessaloniki–Evzonoi) and the Piraeus–Platy railway, on which it has a passenger station (Rentis) and a large marshalling yard. The Olympiacos training center is in this area. The Olympiacos Volleyball stadium is also nearby.

== History ==
Agios Ioannis Renti was part of the municipality of Athens until 1925 when it became a separate community. It was elevated to municipality status in 1946.

== Economy ==
The Central Market of Athens is located in Agios Ioannis Renti. It is the largest central market of vegetables, meat, and other foods in Greece. In Agios Ioannis Renti is located one of the most important industrial areas of Athens, in which factories of important companies are based, such as Rolco (Biggest detergent manufacturing company in Greece), Mietsel, Pharmasept, and others.

== Education ==
The Athens School of Fine Arts is located in Agios Ioannis Renti.

== Historical population ==
| Year | Municipality population |
|---|---|
| 1981 | 16,276 |
| 1991 | 14,218 |
| 2001 | 15,060 |
| 2011 | 16,050 |
| 2021 | 15,411 |

== International relations ==
Agios Ioannis Renti is twinned with Kadıköy, Turkey, since 2003.

== See also ==
- List of municipalities of Attica
