= Tambouria =

Tambouria (in Greek "Ταμπούρια") is a suburb that lies north-west of Piraeus in Athens, Greece. A part of it belongs to the municipality of Piraeus and another part of it to the municipality of Keratsini-Drapetsona. It took its name from the redoubts that the Greeks made there during the Greek Revolution (the word "tambouria" is Turkish and means "redoubts").
