= Faliro metro station =

Athens Metro station and tram stop

Νέο Φάληρο Neo Faliro Γήπεδο Καραϊσκάκη Gipedo Karaiskaki Στάδιο Ειρήνης & Φιλίας Stadio Irinis & Filias
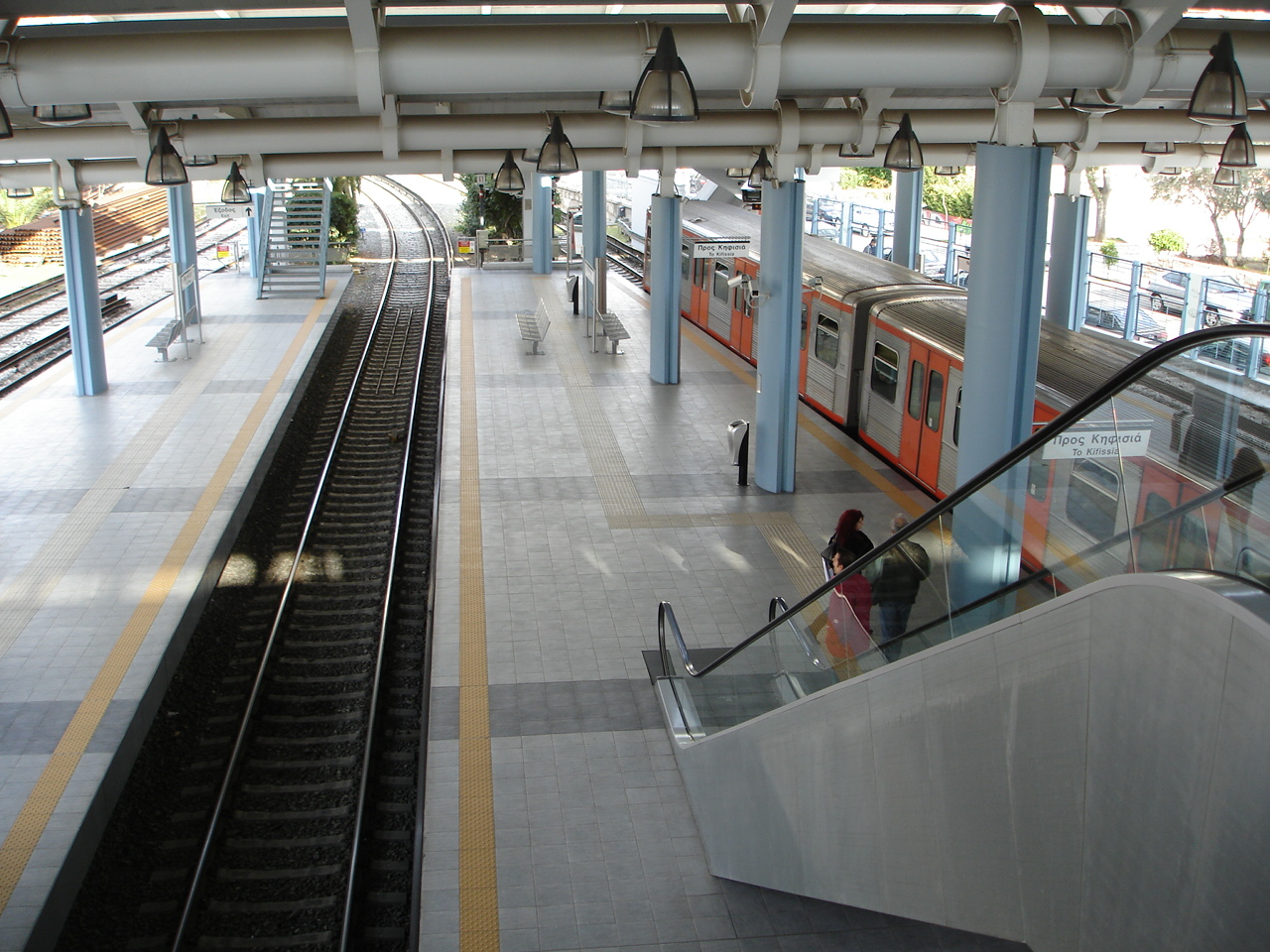
- Metro station platforms

General information
- Other names: Neo Faliro
- Location: Neo Faliro; 185 47 Piraeus; Greece
- Coordinates: 37.944960°N 23.665285°E
- Manager: STASY
- Line: Athens Metro Athens Metro Line 1
- Platforms: 3 ESP sol. (Line 1); 4 island (Tram, SEF); 1 side (Tram, Gipedo Karaiskaki)
- Tracks: 8
- Connections: Athens Tram Athens Tram Line 7

Construction
- Structure type: At-grade
- Platform levels: 2
- Accessible: Yes

Key dates
- 27 February 1869: Line 1 opened
- 9 August 1882: Line 1 station opened
- 16 February 1887: Line 1 station resited
- 14 June 2004: Line 1 station rebuilt
- 19 July 2004: SEF tram stop opened
- 28 November 2019: Gipedo tram stop opened

Services
| Preceding station | Athens Metro | Following station |
|---|---|---|
| Piraeus Terminus | Line 1 | Moschato towards Kifissia |
| Preceding station | Athens Tram | Following station |
| Mikras Asias towards Akti Poseidonos | Line 7 westbound only transfer at Gipedo Karaiskaki | Neo Faliro towards Asklepieio Voulas |
| Omiridou Skylitsi One-way operation | Line 7 eastbound only transfer at Stadio Irinis & Filias | Neo Faliro towards Asklepieio Voulas |
Location

Faliro (Greek: Φάληρο), also known as Neo Faliro (Greek: Νέο Φάληρο) on signage and maps, is a station on Athens Metro Line 1. It is near the Faliro Coastal Zone Olympic Complex (Peace and Friendship Stadium and the Karaiskakis Stadium). The station is also adjacent to a rolling stock depot.

== Tram stops ==
Two tram stops serve Faliro metro station, both of which are located next to Poseidonos Avenue:

- Gipedo Karaiskaki (Greek: Γήπεδο Καραϊσκάκη) serves westbound Line 7 trams heading towards Akti Poseidonos in Piraeus, and is connected to the metro station via a pedestrian underpass.
- Stadio Irinis & Filias (Greek: Στάδιο Ειρήνης & Φιλίας), abbreviated to as SEF, serves eastbound Line 7 trams heading towards Asklepieio Voulas, and is connected to the metro station with a footbridge over Poseidonos Avenue.

Stadio Irinis & Filias opened on 19 July 2004, as the western terminus of the initial network for the 2004 Summer Olympics in Athens. Gipedo Karaiskaki opened on 28 November 2019, originally as an alighting point for trams heading towards the Port of Piraeus. Both stops were closed from 16 March 2020 to 21 January 2021, due to realignment works associated with the Faliro Waterfront regeneration project.

Stadio Irinis & Filias consists of two island platforms and four tracks, and has a set of crossovers to the east, allowing trams to turn back in case of disruption on the Piraeus loop: the crossovers were also in regular use when Stadio Irinis & Filias was the terminus.

== Station layout ==
L1
Concourse
- Customer service
- Tickets
- Entry/Exit
- Stadium
G
North track
No regular service
Island platform (Spanish solution)
Westbound
← towards Piraeus (terminus)
Island platform (Spanish solution)
Eastbound
towards Kifissia (Moschato) →
Side platform (Spanish solution)

← Ethnarchou Makariou
G
Westbound
← towards Akti Poseidonos (Mikras Asias)
Side platform

← Poseidonos Avenue →
G
Eastbound
towards Asklepieio Voulas (Neo Faliro) →
Island platform
Eastbound
towards Asklepieio Voulas (Neo Faliro) →
Terminus track
No regular service
Island platform
Terminus track
No regular service
B1
Subway
Underpass between and westbound
