= Trams in Athens (1882-1960) =

Operation
- Locale: Athens, Greece
- Status: Closed (first generation); Operational (modern system)

Statistics
Horsecar era: 1882–1908
- Status: Converted to electricity
- Track gauge: 1,000 mm (3 ft 3 3/8 in) metre gauge
- Propulsion system: Horses
Steam engine era: 1887–1908
- Status: Converted to electricity
- Lines: 1
- Track gauge: 1,000 mm (3 ft 3 3/8 in) metre gauge
- Propulsion system: Steam engine
Electric tram era: 1908–1960
- Status: Closed
- Lines: 21
- Track gauge: 1,000 mm (3 ft 3 3/8 in) metre gauge
- Propulsion system: Electric
- Depot: Aghia Triada Keramikou
Modern tram era: Since 19 July 2004
- Status: Operational
- Lines: 3
- Owner: Urban Rail Transport S.A. (STASY)
- Operator: Urban Rail Transport S.A. (STASY)
- Track gauge: 1,435 mm (4 ft 8 1/2 in) standard gauge
- Propulsion system: Electric
- Stock: 35 Sirio vehicles
- Route length: 27 km (16.8 mi)
- Stops: 48
- Website: http://www.stasy.gr/index.php?id=343&L=1 STASY Tramway

Trams in Athens have existed in two separate generations, the first from 1882 to 1960, and the second since 2004. There were no trams at all in Athens between 1960 and 2004, though the separate Piraeus-Perama light railway remained in operation between nearby Perama and Piraeus until 1977.

Athens' first-generation metre gauge tram network began operation as a horse tram system, before being converted to electric trams in the early twentieth century. The original Athens tram network completely closed by 1960.

Trams returned in 2004 with the opening of a standard gauge modern tram network in Athens just prior to the 2004 Summer Olympics.

== History ==
=== Horse trams ===
Trams made their first appearance on the streets of Athens in 1882. As with the first tram systems in most cities, these were horsecars pulled by three horses. The tram system ran on metre gauge rails. The first 16 tram vehicles were lightweight vehicles, using covered tops for the winter and providing 16 seats, and using open tops for the summer which provided 20 seats. The 800 horses that were used for the early tram network were from Asia Minor, and their relatively small size were appropriate for the sloping streets of Athens and the tramway's continuous stops.

The first tramlines connected the center of Athens with the suburbs (as they were at that time) such as Patissia, Ampelokipi and Kolokinthou. Other lines connected Omonoia Square with Syntagma, Gkazi, Keramiko Dipilo. By 1902, tramlines served Ippokratous, Mitropoleos and Acharnon streets as well.

=== Steam tram ===
The steam-powered tram of Faliro started its operation in 1887. Having its starting point in front of the Academy of Athens it traversed Panepistimiou street, Amalias and Thisseos avenues, traveling to Tzitzifies and from there along the coastal road to end up at Faliro, which at that time was the location of seaside resorts and sea baths. This line was converted to electricity when the rest of the tram network was.

=== Electrified trams ===
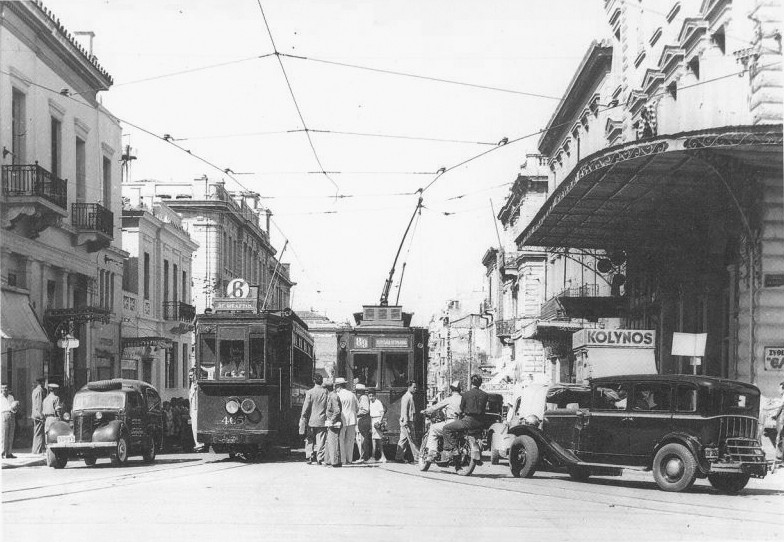
Trams in Athens in the 1950s at Omonoia Square.

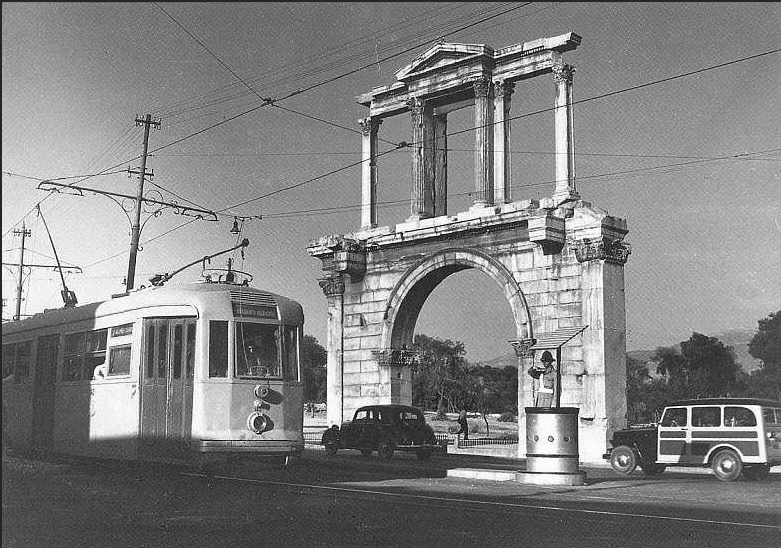
A tram passing in front of the Hadrian's Gate, sometime in the early 1950s.

On 30 October 1908, the operation of the first metre gauge electric tramways began in Athens, which would gradually replace the horsecar trams. In the two years that followed, the tram network acquired 257 vehicles – 150 of them were motored while the other 107 were trailers – along with the previous tramcars, which were reused as trailers. These new tram vehicles for use on Athens' electric tramways were built in Belgium and had a beige livery; they were closed-top, had electric lighting, and comfortable seats with a prediction of 16 seats for sitting patrons and 14 places for standing patrons. The motorized trams had two motors which were ideal for the lines on the slopes of Athens. At that time, the cost of the trip was just one penny.

With electrification, the tram system expanded until the network consisted of 21 lines.

In 1939, a large number of the Belgian-built tramcars that had been in operation on the Athens tramway since its electrification were sold, while the remaining tram vehicles in use were renovated and their livery was changed to dark green. In the following year, Athens received 60 large, modern tram vehicles which were included in a supplementary contract that had been signed by the Greek government in 1937. The new vehicles were constructed by the Italian consortium ΟΜ/CGE/Breda of Milan, and had a yellow livery, and the same aerodynamic design as the tram model used on the tramways of Milan.

=== Decline of Athens tramway ===
On 28 October 1940, the tramways of Athens participated in recruitment for the war. After the Occupation started, the decline of Athens' tramway began, as some tramlines were abolished. However, the real decline of the network took place when the crews of Ministry of Public Works dramatically dismantled the tracks at the Haftia node during the first morning hours of 16 November 1953, resulting in the decommissioning of the lines Patisia–Ampelokipi and Kipseli–Pagrati.

The last jingle from a bell of an Athens tram was heard outside of the depot at Aghia Triada Keramikou, at midnight of 15/16 October 1960. Trams, green or yellow, which during their 52 years of operation had transported around 3 billion passengers, would not travel again on the streets of Athens.

=== Piraeus-Perama light railway ===
However, one tram-like railway, the standard gauge Piraeus-Perama light railway, remained in operation. However, on the afternoon of Holy Monday, 4 April 1977, the Piraeus-Perama light railway, decorated with flowers and banners, began its last run from Perama to Piraeus and completed its final journey. The driver Yannis Kostopoulos rang the bell for the last time and directed Vehicle 77 to the depot of street Kononos. At that moment, the epilogue was written for the first generation of Greek tram and light railways.

== Modern Athens Tram ==
In 2004, 44 years after the last tram operated in Athens proper, trams returned to the streets of the capital, in the form of modern and technologically advanced tram vehicles running on a standard gauge rail network. Operation of the modern Athens Tram system began on 19 July 2004, just a month before the 2004 Summer Olympics were held in Athens.

== See also ==
- Athens Metro
