= Nikaia-Agios Ioannis Renti =

Nikaia-Agios Ioannis Renti Νίκαια-Άγιος Ιωάννης Ρέντη
- Municipality
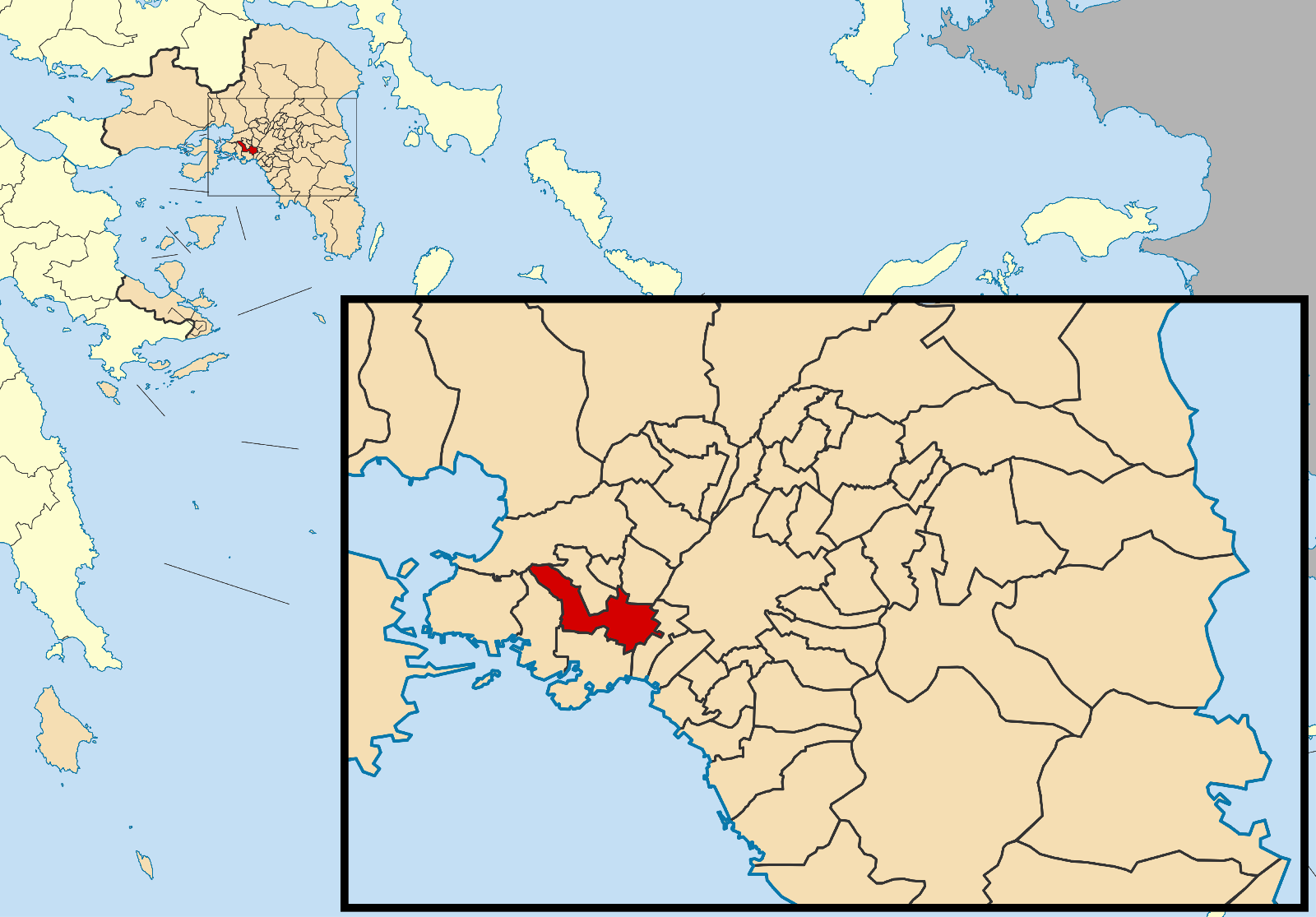

- Location within Greece
- Coordinates: 37°58′N 23°38′E
- Country: Greece
- Administrative region: Attica
- Regional unit: Piraeus

Government
  - Mayor: Konstantinos Maragkakis (since 2023)

Area
  - Municipality: 11.173 km^{2} (4.314 sq mi)

Population (2021)
  - Municipality: 103,488
  - Density: 9,262.3/km^{2} (23,989/sq mi)
- Time zone: UTC+2 (EET)
  - Summer (DST): UTC+3 (EEST)
- Website: nikaia-rentis.gov.gr

Nikaia-Agios Ioannis Renti (Greek: Νίκαια-Άγιος Ιωάννης Ρέντη) is a municipality in the Piraeus regional unit, Attica, Greece. The seat of the municipality is the town Nikaia. The municipality has an area of 11.173 km^{2}.

== Municipality ==
The municipality Nikaia-Agios Ioannis Renti was formed at the 2011 local government reform by the merger of the following 2 former municipalities, that became municipal units:

- Agios Ioannis Renti
- Nikaia
