= Railway Museum of Athens =

Railway museum in Athens, Greece

Coordinates: 38°00′35.3″N 23°43′14.3″E

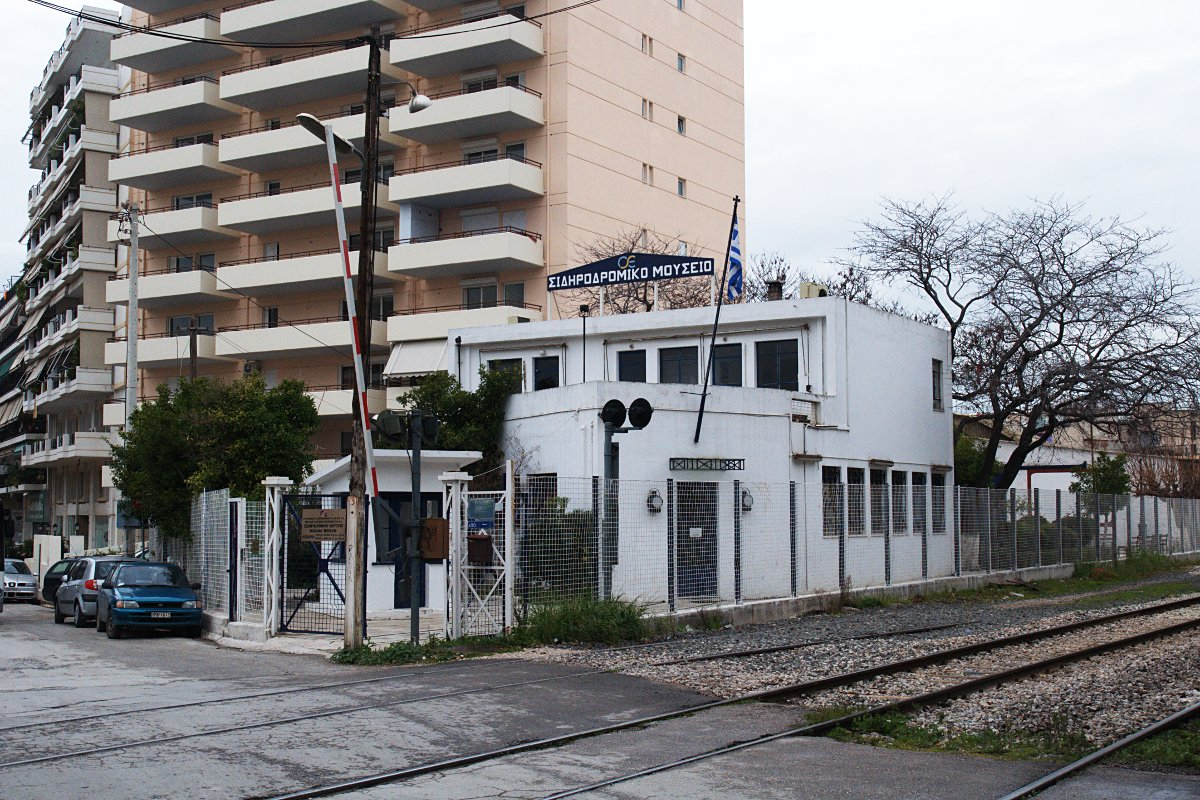
Former museum front building

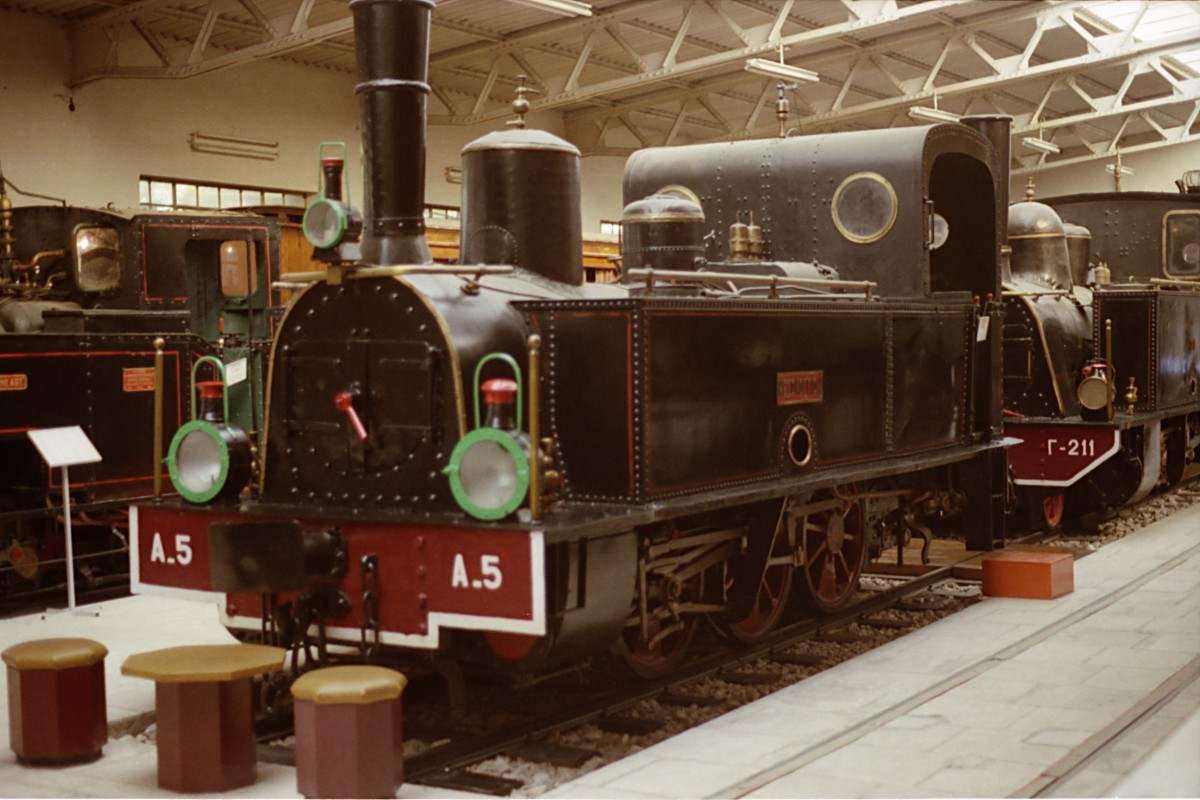
Couillet 0-6-0T locomotive A-5.

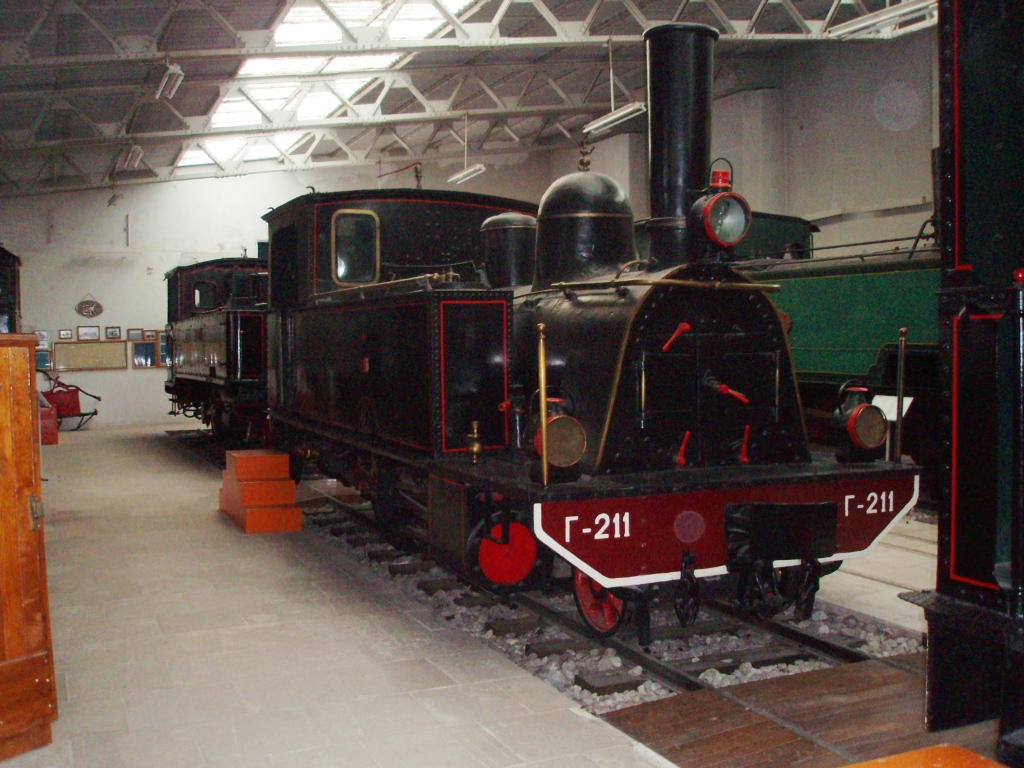
Couillet 2-6-0T locomotive Γ-211.

The Railway Museum of Athens, Greece, was founded by the Hellenic Railways Organisation (OSE) in 1978.

It was located at 4 Siokou Street in Athens, but the collection has since been moved to the former MPR Depot site in Lefka, Piraeus in 2019 (not to be confused with the Electric Railways Museum of Piraeus. The museum has a collection of items related to the history of rail transport in Greece, it is now (2022) closed for public.

== Notable exhibits ==
The rolling stock in the museum's collection includes the following:

- Krauss 0-4-0T metre gauge steam locomotive 4, Tiryns (1884).
- Couillet 0-6-0T metre gauge steam locomotive A-5, Messolongion, of the former Northeastern Greece Railways (1888).
- Couillet 2-6-0T metre gauge steam locomotive Γ-211 (1890).
- 2-6-0 metre gauge locomotive Z-7505 of SPAP, Societé Alscacienne de Constructions Mechaniques Grafenstaden (1890).
- Cail 0-6-2RT 750 mm (2 ft 5 1/2 in) steam locomotive no 4 of Diakofto Kalavrita Railway (1899) with ΔΚ-111 3rd class passenger coach.
- Β 151 2-4-0 metre gauge steam locomotive made by Henschel & Sohn, Cassel, S/N 11135 (1912).
- Εα 204 Batignolles 2-6-0T standard gauge steam locomotive (1903), converted to a snowplough.
- Royal saloon (standard gauge) of Athens-Piraeus Railway. Built at Piraeus Works of Athens & Piraeus Railway (predecessor of EIS and ISAP) as a gift to King George I for the 25 anniversary of his reign. It was first exhibited at the Olympia International Exhibition of Athens (1888).
- Open coach (standard gauge), a present of Oriental Railways to Sultan Abdul Aziz of the Ottoman Empire.
- MAN/EIS standard gauge tram vehicle 63 of the former Piraeus Harbour Tram (1935) of Hellenic Electric Railways S.A. (EIS).

Three industrial locomotives from Eretria Chrome Mines:

- An 0-2-0T industrial 600 mm (1 ft 11 5/8 in) steam locomotive made by Jung (1927).
- An 0-2-0T industrial 600 mm (1 ft 11 5/8 in) steam locomotive made by Orenstein & Koppel (1904).
- An industrial 600 mm (1 ft 11 5/8 in) diesel locomotive made by Klöckner-Humboldt-Deutz AG (1957).

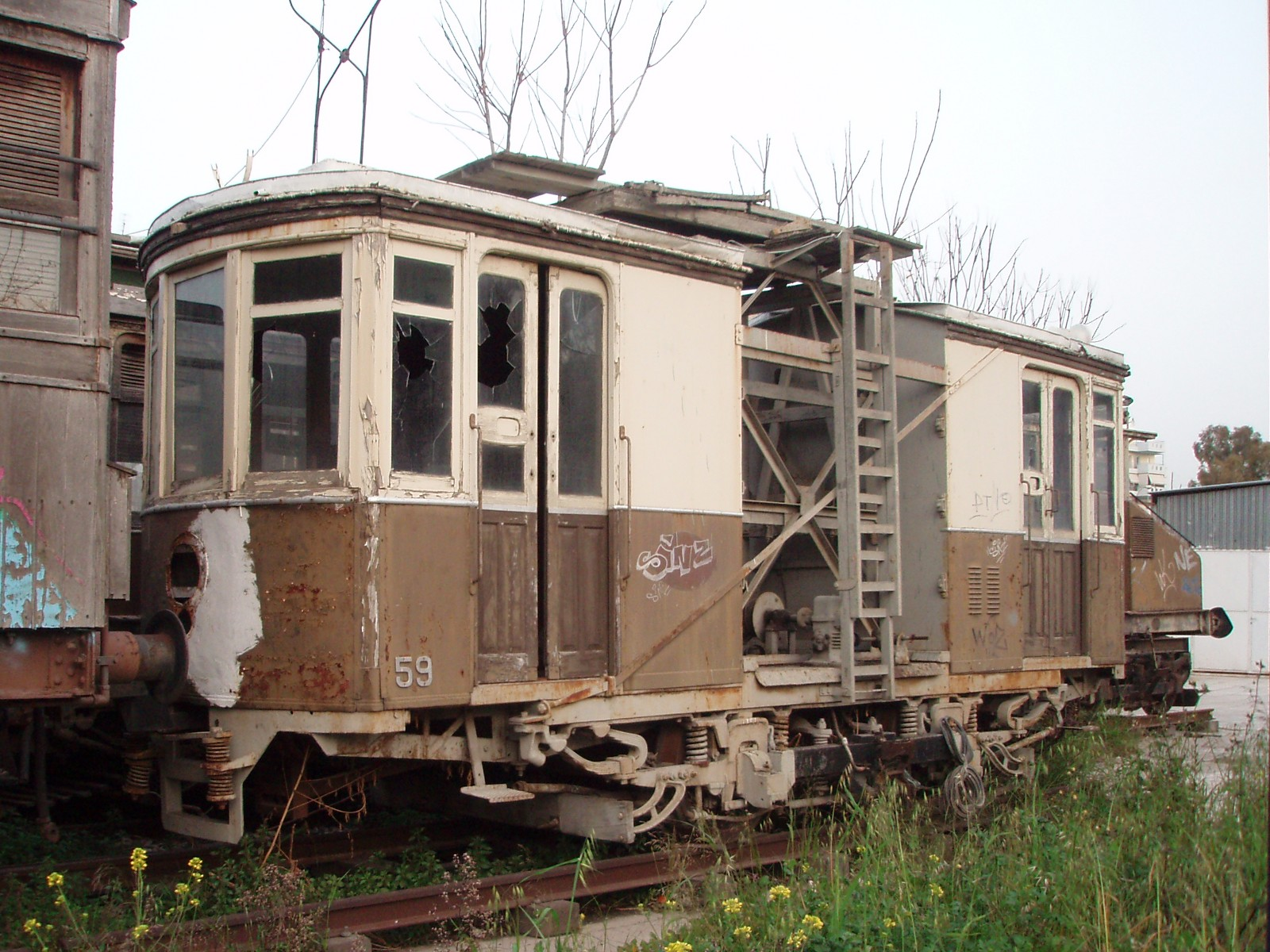
Overhead line maintenance vehicle of Piraeus Harbour tram

In poor condition, the following 1,435 mm (4 ft 8 1/2 in) EIS/ISAP rolling stock is in open air storage awaiting renovation:

- Tram car EIS 54 of Piraeus Harbour tram.
- EIS 59 overhead line maintenance vehicle of Piraeus Harbour Tram.
- EIS 31 Goossens steeple-cab electric locomotive.
- EIS 501A trailer for first generation EMU.
- An electric railcar of Piraeus-Perama light railway.

== See also ==
- Electric Railways Museum of Piraeus
