= Kallithea metro station =

Athens Metro station

Καλλιθέα Kallithea
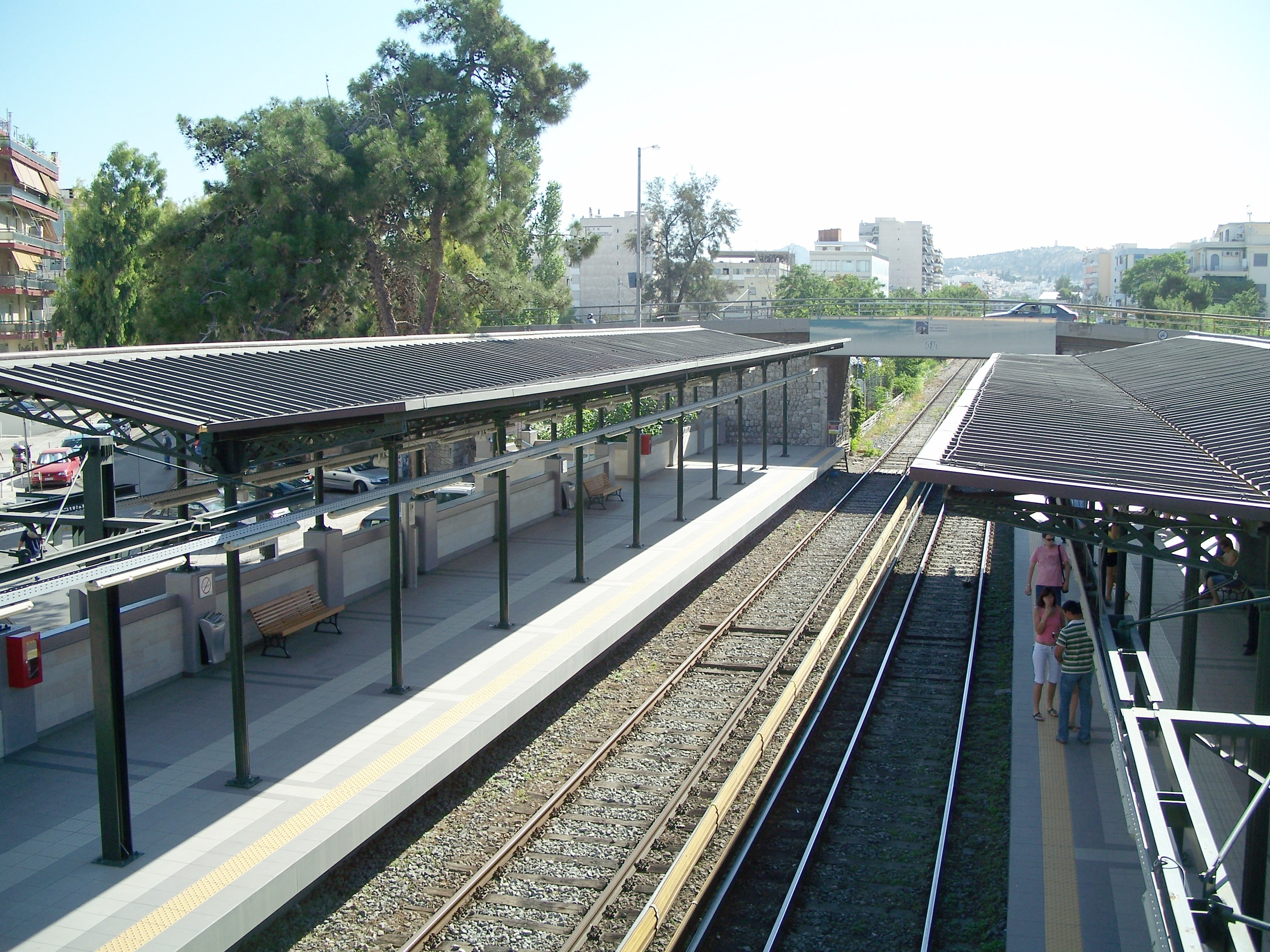
- Station view

General information
- Location: Kallithea; Greece
- Coordinates: 37.960395°N 23.697005°E
- Manager: STASY
- Line: Athens Metro Line 1
- Platforms: 2
- Tracks: 2

Construction
- Structure type: At-grade
- Accessible: Yes

Key dates
- 27 February 1869: Line opened
- 1 July 1928: Station opened
- 17 October 2003: Station rebuilt

Services
Preceding station	Athens Metro	Following station
Moschato towards Piraeus	Line 1	Tavros towards Kifissia
Location

Kallithea (Greek: Καλλιθέα) is an Athens Metro Line 1 station, located in the municipality of Kallithea in the regional unit of South Athens, Attica, and is also named after, 5.558 km from Piraeus. It is located in by the boundary with Kallithea. The station was opened by the Hellenic Electric Railways on 1 July 1928, and was renovated in 2004. The station contains two platforms. Its nearest station is 600 metres (2,000 ft) to the east.

== Station Layout ==
L1
Footbridge
Overpass between platforms
G
- Customer service
- Tickets
- Entry/Exit
Side platform
Westbound
← towards Piraeus (Moschato)
Eastbound
towards Kifissia (Tavros) →
Side platform
