= Moschato-Tavros =

Moschato-Tavros Μοσχάτο-Ταύρος
- Municipality
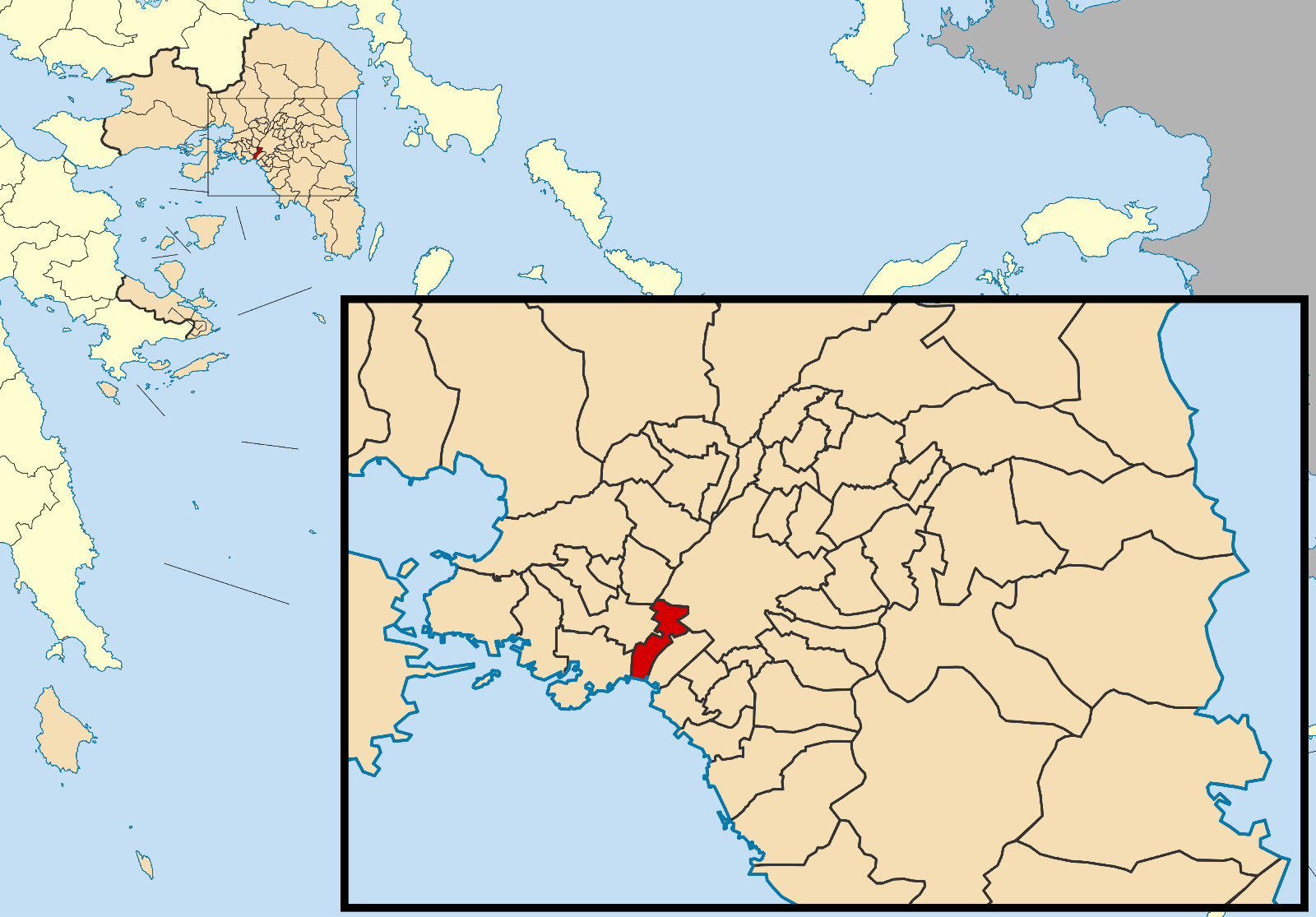

- Location within Greece
- Coordinates: 37°54′N 23°45′E
- Country: Greece
- Administrative region: Attica
- Regional unit: South Athens

Government
  - Mayor: Andreas Efthymiou (since 2011)

Area
  - Municipality: 4.45 km^{2} (1.72 sq mi)

Population (2021)
  - Municipality: 39,661
  - Density: 8,910/km^{2} (23,100/sq mi)
- Time zone: UTC+2 (EET)
  - Summer (DST): UTC+3 (EEST)
- Website: dimosmoschatou-tavrou.gr

Moschato-Tavros (Greek: Μοσχάτο-Ταύρος) is a municipality in the South Athens regional unit, Attica, Greece. The seat of the municipality is the town Moschato. The municipality has an area of 4.450 km^{2}.

== Municipality ==
The municipality Moschato-Tavros was formed at the 2011 local government reform by the merger of two former municipalities, that became municipal units:

- Moschato
- Tavros
