= Keratsini-Drapetsona =

Keratsini-Drapetsona Κερατσίνι-Δραπετσώνα
- Municipality

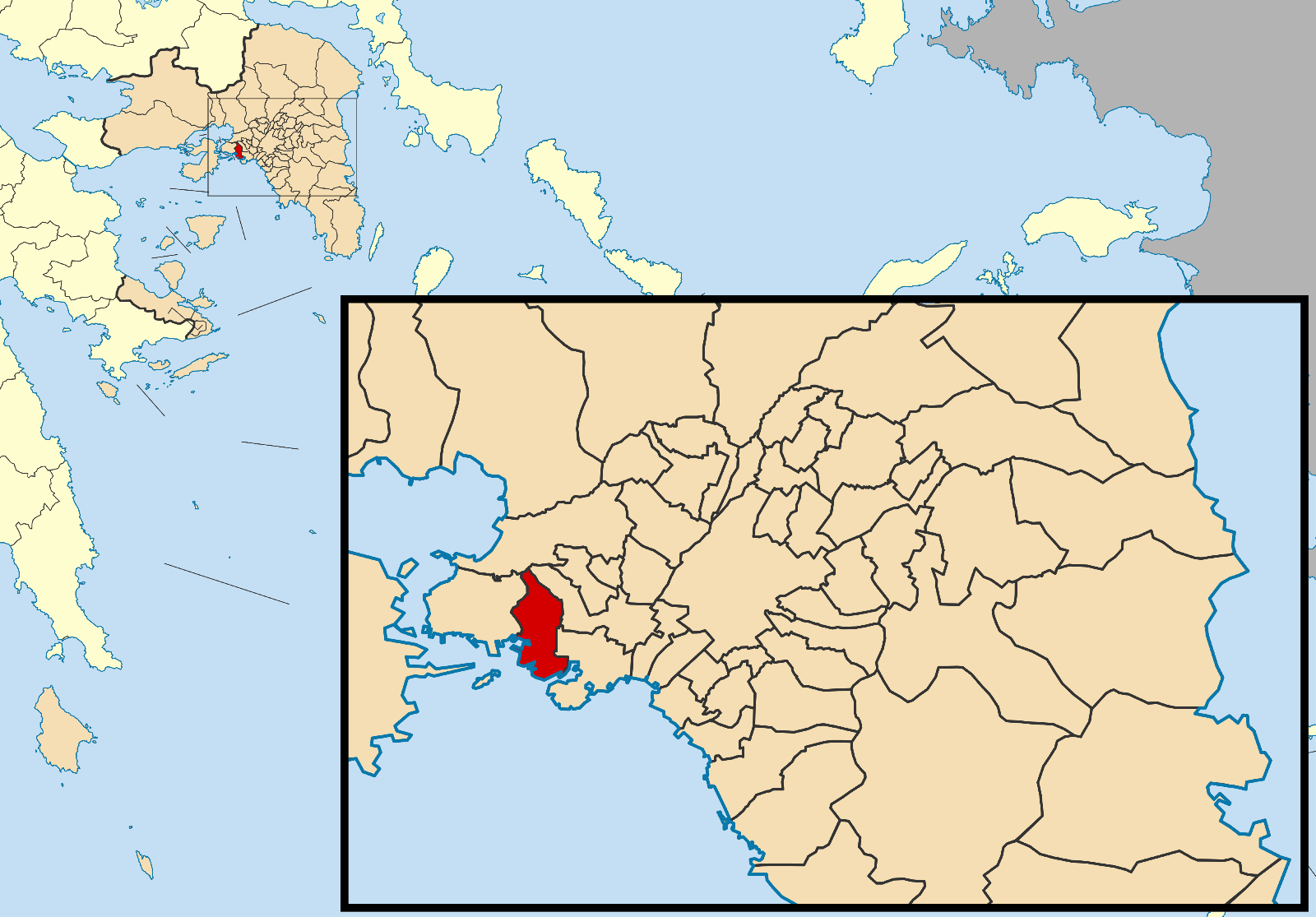

- Location within Greece
- Coordinates: 37°58′N 23°37′E
- Country: Greece
- Administrative region: Attica
- Regional unit: Piraeus

Government
  - Mayor: Christos Vrettakos (since 2014)

Area
  - Municipality: 9.326 km^{2} (3.601 sq mi)

Population (2021)
  - Municipality: 89,536
  - Density: 9,601/km^{2} (24,870/sq mi)
- Time zone: UTC+2 (EET)
  - Summer (DST): UTC+3 (EEST)

Keratsini-Drapetsona (Greek: Κερατσίνι-Δραπετσώνα) is a municipality in the Piraeus regional unit, Attica, Greece. The seat of the municipality is the town of Keratsini. The municipality has a population of 89,386 inhabitants, according to the 2021 census and an area of 9.326 square kilometres (3.601 sq mi).

The municipality was formed at the 2011 local government reform by the merger of the two former municipalities Drapetsona and Keratsini, which became municipal units.
