= Piraeus-Perama light railway =

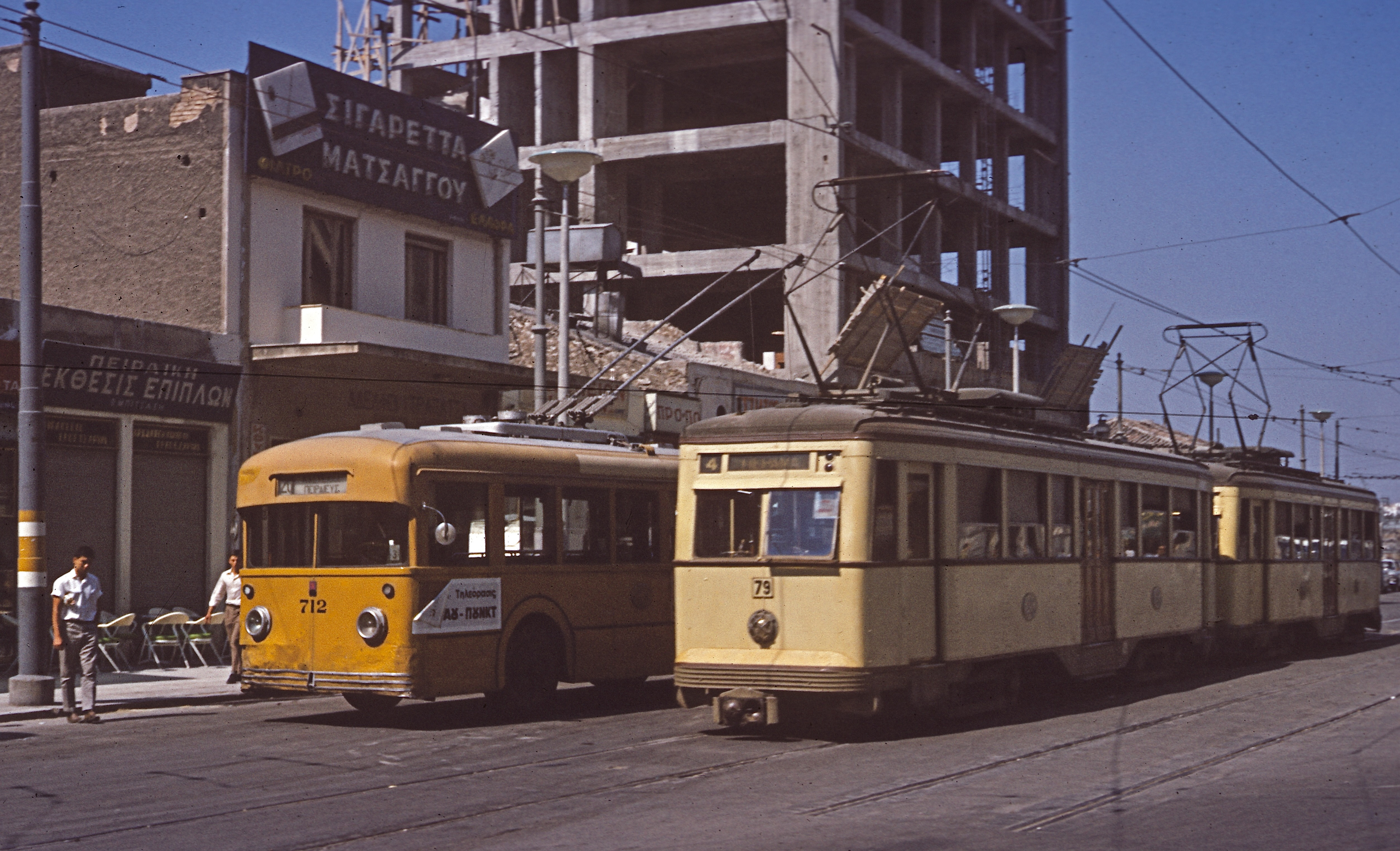
- A tram at the line's Piraeus terminus in 1968

Overview
- Native name: Τραμ Περάματος
- Status: closed
- Owner: EIS
- Locale: Piraeus, Greece
- Termini: Piraeus; Salamis Naval Base
- Stations: 21

Service
- Type: suburban light railway
- Services: 2
- Route number: 3 & 4
- Rolling stock: Breda

History
- Commenced: 1930
- Opened: 20 July 1936
- Completed: 1935
- Suspended: 11 January 1944
- Reopened: April 1945
- Closed: 23 March 1977

Technical
- Line length: 9.7 km (6.0 mi)
- Number of tracks: single, with passing loops
- Track gauge: 1,435 mm (4 ft 8 1/2 in) standard gauge
- Electrification: 600 V DC overhead line
- Operating speed: 50 km/h (30 mph)
- Signalling: none

The Piraeus-Perama light railway (Greek: Τραμ Περάματος) was a standard gauge suburban light railway line in Greece which connected Piraeus with Perama and Salamis Naval Base. The line was owned by the Hellenic Electric Railways private company and operated from 1936 to 1977.

== History ==
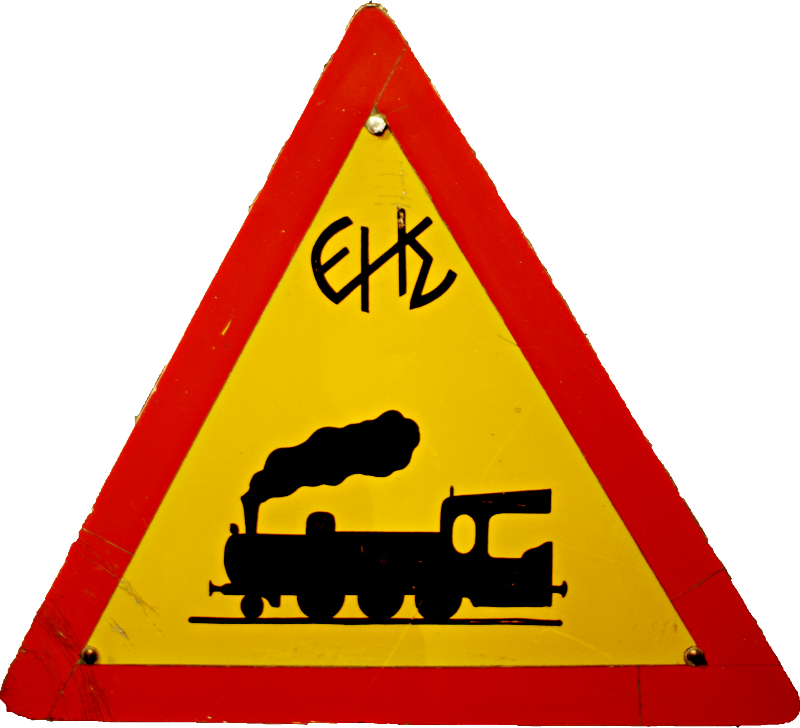
Piraeus-Perama level crossing sign (1935)

The construction of a railway line connecting Piraeus to Perama was decided when the Hellenic Navy developed Salamis Naval Base as their main naval facility in the 1890s. The right to build the line was given to the former "Athens-Piraeus Railway company S.A.". However no action was taken until 1930, when the successor company "Hellenic Electric Railways" member of British company "Power and Traction Finance Ltd" decided to start construction of the line. Construction was finished in 1935 but services did not start until 20 July 1936, when rolling stock became available by Breda Costruzioni Ferroviarie.

The line was standard gauge, electrified at 600 V DC by an overhead line system. The first 710 metres (780 yd) of the line operated as a street running tramway along Kondyli Coast, using the existing Piraeus Harbour tramway tracks. After this point the line was separated from road traffic, running on its own railway type right-of-way, laid with Vignoles rail having a mass of 34 kg/m (68.5 lb/yd), thus allowing even standard railway rolling stock to use the line. As the line was single-track, seven passing loops were constructed along its length to allow a frequent service in both directions. No signal system was ever installed and safe circulation was achieved by the use of predefined passing loops per each service. The last 800 metres (870 yd) section of the line was located within the naval base area and only Navy personnel bearing a pass, controlled by Naval Police, was allowed to continue.

During the World War II German occupation the line was connected to the mainline of the Hellenic State Railways with a curve at Methonis street, allowing freight trains to access Keratsini Port. At Keratsini a short branch was constructed leading to one of the jetties. Due to serious damages on infrastructure and rolling stock caused by Allied bombing of Piraeus on 11 January 1944 the line paused service until April 1945.

Most of its time the line was run with two kind of regular services: one full length service from Piraeus to the Naval Base, operating every 15 minutes with two car sets (line number 4) and in between, 7 1/2 minutes after, a short service from Piraeus to St. George at Keratsini aerea with single cars (line number 3). Services continued in the 1960s, surviving the anti-tramway fashion of the era that resulted in the total closure of the Athenian and Piraeus metre gauge network owned by the Electric Company of Transports (in Greek Ηλεκτρική Εταιρεία Μεταφορών – Η.Ε.Μ.) and in the discontinuation of the rest of the standard-gauge Piraeus Harbour tramway. Plans for renovation of the line and a further extension to Eleusis were announced in the mid-1970s but never came to life and neither the line was modernized as promised nor new rolling stock was acquired. Therefore, due to the shortage of operational rolling stock in regard with the age of the vehicles (almost 40 years old), by 1975 the short service to Keratsini was discontinued and only service on line 4 was provided every 20 minutes using single cars. Eventually the line was closed on 23 March 1977.

Most of the right of way of the light railway was finally paved over and became a pedestrianised street. At Thermopylon street, near the church of Ayios Dionysios (St. Dennis) in Piraeus, the tracks survive intact. At several level crossings, the rails were never removed and are still visible today. A tram car survives in Perama on the old right of way, albeit in a dilapidated condition. Between Tsorpatzoglou Square in Perama (where civilians should alight) and the Naval Base itself, most of the infrastructure, including the tracks, platform, shelter and masts, remains intact. Plans are to re-instate the line and connect it to the modern Athens Tram system, running underground because the narrowness of the old right of way makes it unsuitable for laying double track on the surface, and because of the heavy motor vehicle traffic in the area.

== Rolling stock ==
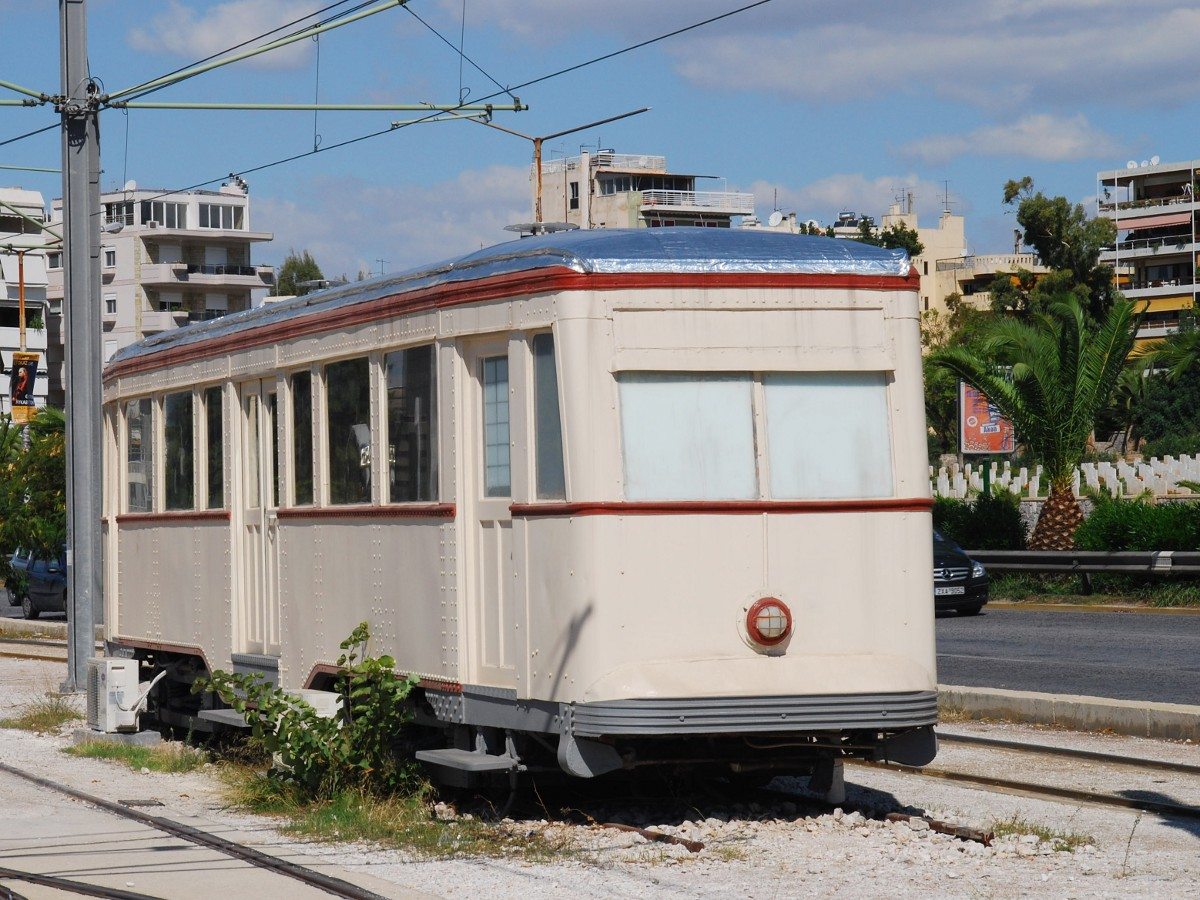
Railcar no 82 of the defunct Piraeus-Perama suburban light railway (1936–1977) at Pikrodaphni tram station

The rolling stock was made in Italy by OM-CGE-Breda Costruzioni Ferroviarie. It consisted of 12 (numbered from 71 to 82) very innovative for the time electric vehicles, fitted with pantograph, Scharfenberg couplers and driver operated pneumatic doors. The vehicles could reach a speed of 50 kilometres per hour (30 mph) and had enough space for about 100 passengers. The "little trains", as the locals affectionally called them, were stored and serviced in the depot located in the Hellenic Electric Railways premises, next to Piraeus station. Some survive at various locations e.g. Kasomouli and Pikrodaphne tram stop used as rest places for the tramway drivers, STASY S.A. children's camp at Varybobi, Thission depot of ex ISAP, Greek Railway Museum but none are in good condition.

The section between Methonis street and Keratsini harbour was used by a wide variety of freight trains using steam and diesel traction.

== See also ==
- Electric Railways Museum of Piraeus
- Athens Tram
