= Electric Railways Museum of Piraeus =

Museum in Piraeus, Greece

Coordinates: 37°56′53.3″N 23°38′33.4″E

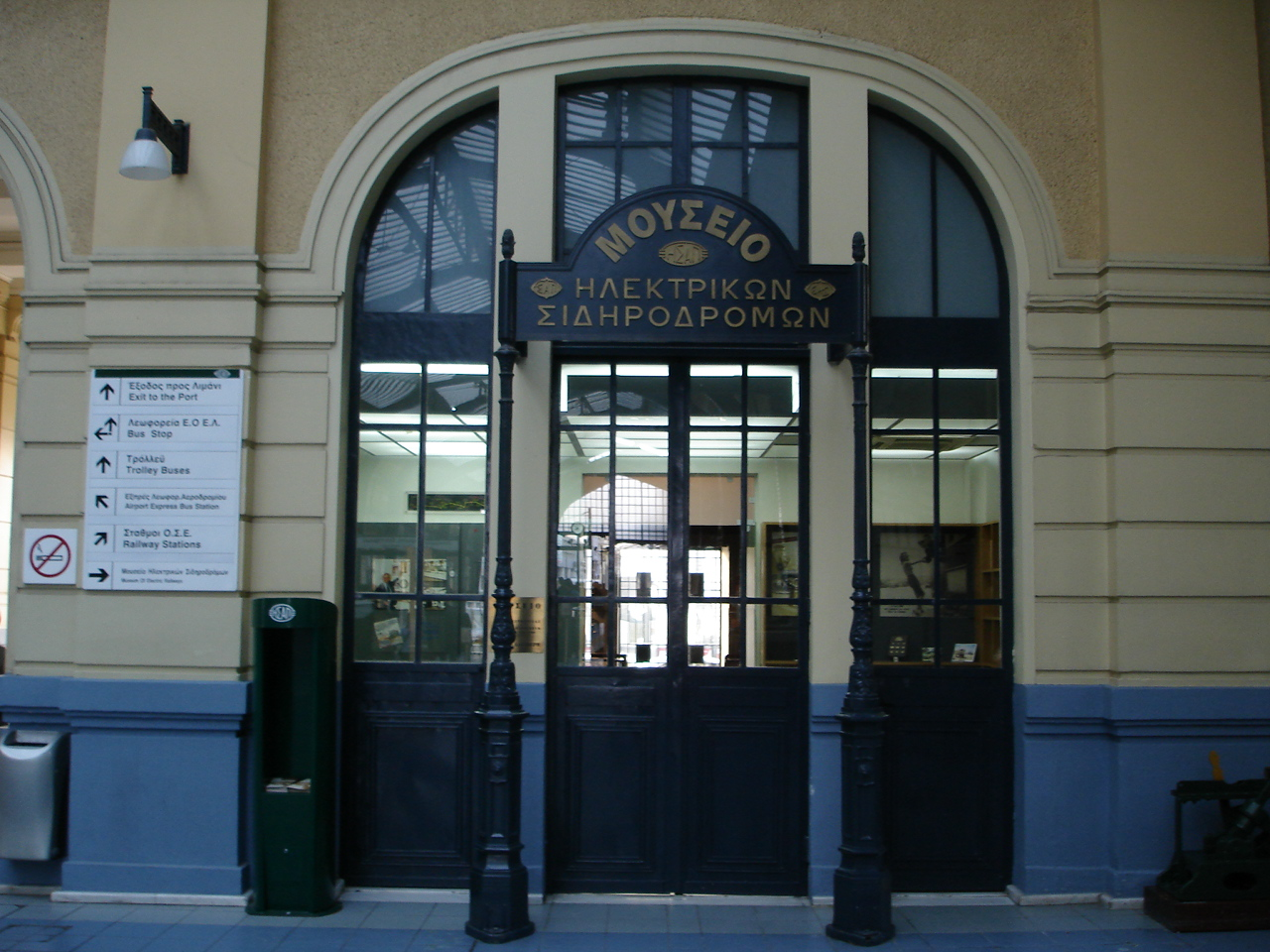
Museum front.

The Electric Railways Museum of Piraeus (Greek: Μουσείο Ηλεκτρικών Σιδηροδρόμων) is a railway museum in Piraeus, Athens, Greece. The museum opened in 2005, displaying the personal collection of a former railway employee.

== History ==
The museum was established in November 2005 in the space of the former Post Office in Piraeus railway station. The museum was founded by Mr Manolis Fotopoulos, a former employee of the Athens–Piraeus Electric Railways (ISAP) since 1990. He started gathering items for the museum in 1995 after his retirement, searching in old warehouses and junkyards for interesting items, before the collection was opened to the public in 2005. The museum displays a collection of small size items, photographs and documents related to the history of Athens-Piraeus Railway, Hellenic Electric Railways (EIS), Piraeus-Perama light railway, Piraeus Harbour tramway, Electric Transport Company (IEM) and ISAP. The museum also owns a collection of approximately 6000 items, and 3000 books, leaflets and other documents, currently in storage. There are plans to extend the museum to add a library to display this collection. In addition to this, they own one of the first twelve wagons in operation on this railway. The museum's collection is labelled in Greek, but leaflets are available in English to aid visitors who do not speak the language. The museum is currently managed by Pavlos Koulovassilopoulos.
