= Keratsini =

Keratsini Κερατσίνι
- Municipal unit
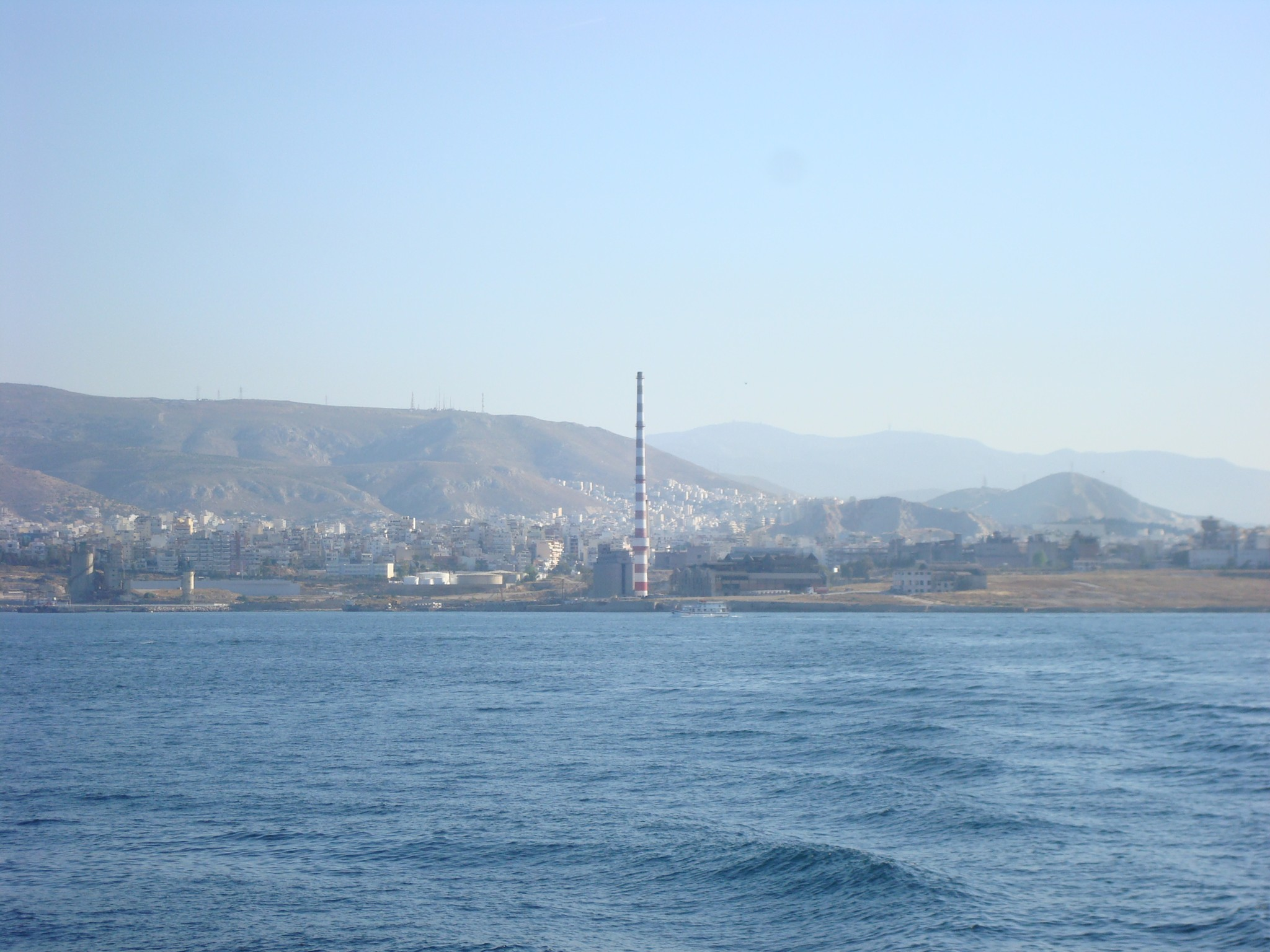
- View of Keratsini power station

- Location within the regional unit

- Location within Greece
- Coordinates: 37°58′N 23°37′E
- Country: Greece
- Administrative region: Attica
- Regional unit: Piraeus
- Municipality: Keratsini-Drapetsona

Area
  - Municipal unit: 7.601 km^{2} (2.935 sq mi)
- Elevation: 40 m (130 ft)

Population (2021)
  - Municipal unit: 75,721
  - Municipal unit density: 9,962/km^{2} (25,800/sq mi)
- Time zone: UTC+2 (EET)
  - Summer (DST): UTC+3 (EEST)
- Postal code: 187 xx
- Area code: 210
- Vehicle registration: Z
- Website: www.keratsini.gr

Keratsini (Greek: Κερατσίνι) is a suburban town in the western part of the Piraeus regional unit, which in turn is a part of the Athens Urban Area. Since the 2011 local government reform it is part of the municipality Keratsini-Drapetsona, of which it is the seat and a municipal unit.

== Geography ==
Keratsini is situated on the Saronic Gulf coast, 3 km (1.9 mi) northwest of Piraeus and about 9.5 kilometres (6 miles) west of Athens. The municipal unit has an area of 7.601 km^{2}. The coastal area consists mainly of port facilities, part of the Port of Piraeus.

== Culture ==
Keratsini has its own non-professional choir (mixed voices, SATB). It has participated many times in festivals all around Greece. The town has its own choir festival called international song festival.

=== Sports ===
Keratsini hosts the football club Keratsini FC with earlier presence in Gamma Ethniki and the basketball club Faros Keratsiniou B.C. with presence in A2 Ethniki basketball.

Sport clubs based in Keratsini
Club	Founded	Sports	Achievements
Keratsini FC	1926	Football	Earlier presence in Gamma Ethniki.
Faros Keratsiniou B.C.	1971	Basketball	Presence in A2 Ethniki.

== Historical population ==
Year	Municipality
1981	74,179
1991	71,982
2001	76,102
2011	77,077
2021	75,721

== International relations ==
Keratsini is twinned with Prešov, Slovakia, since 1994.
