= Piraeus (regional unit) =

Piraeus Περιφερειακή ενότητα Πειραιώς
- Regional unit
- Municipalities of Piraeus

- Piraeus within Greece

- Location within Greece
- Coordinates: 37°58′N 23°38′E
- Country: Greece
- Administrative region: Attica
- Seat: Piraeus

Area
  - Total: 50.4 km^{2} (19.5 sq mi)

Population (2021)
  - Total: 448,051
  - Density: 8,890/km^{2} (23,000/sq mi)
- Time zone: UTC+2 (EET)
  - Summer (DST): UTC+3 (EEST)
- Area code: 210

Piraeus (/paɪˈriːəs, pɪˈreɪəs/ py-REE-əs, pirr-AY-əs; Greek: Περιφερειακή ενότητα Πειραιώς, romanized: Perifereiakí enótita Peiraiós), also sometimes called Greater Piraeus (as distinct from the City of Piraeus; Ευρύτερος Πειραιάς Evrýteros Peiraiás), is one of the regional units of Greece. It is part of the region of Attica. The regional unit covers the west-central part of the Athens urban area (or agglomeration).

== Administration ==
As a part of the 2011 Kallikratis government reform, the regional unit Piraeus was created out of part of the former Piraeus Prefecture. It is subdivided into 5 municipalities. These are:

- Keratsini-Drapetsona
- Korydallos
- Nikaia - Agios Ioannis Rentis
- Perama
- Piraeus

== See also ==
- List of settlements in Attica
