= Poseidonos Avenue =

Coastal avenue of Athens, Greece

Poseidonos Avenue (Greek: Λεωφόρος Ποσειδώνος), also known as Paraliaki (Παραλιακή), is the main coastal road of the Athens agglomeration, Greece. It runs from new Faliro in Piraeus to Glyfada and beyond, traversing all the coastaline of Athens; thus it is the major highway in the southern part of the Greek capital and one of the largest in the Athens urban area.

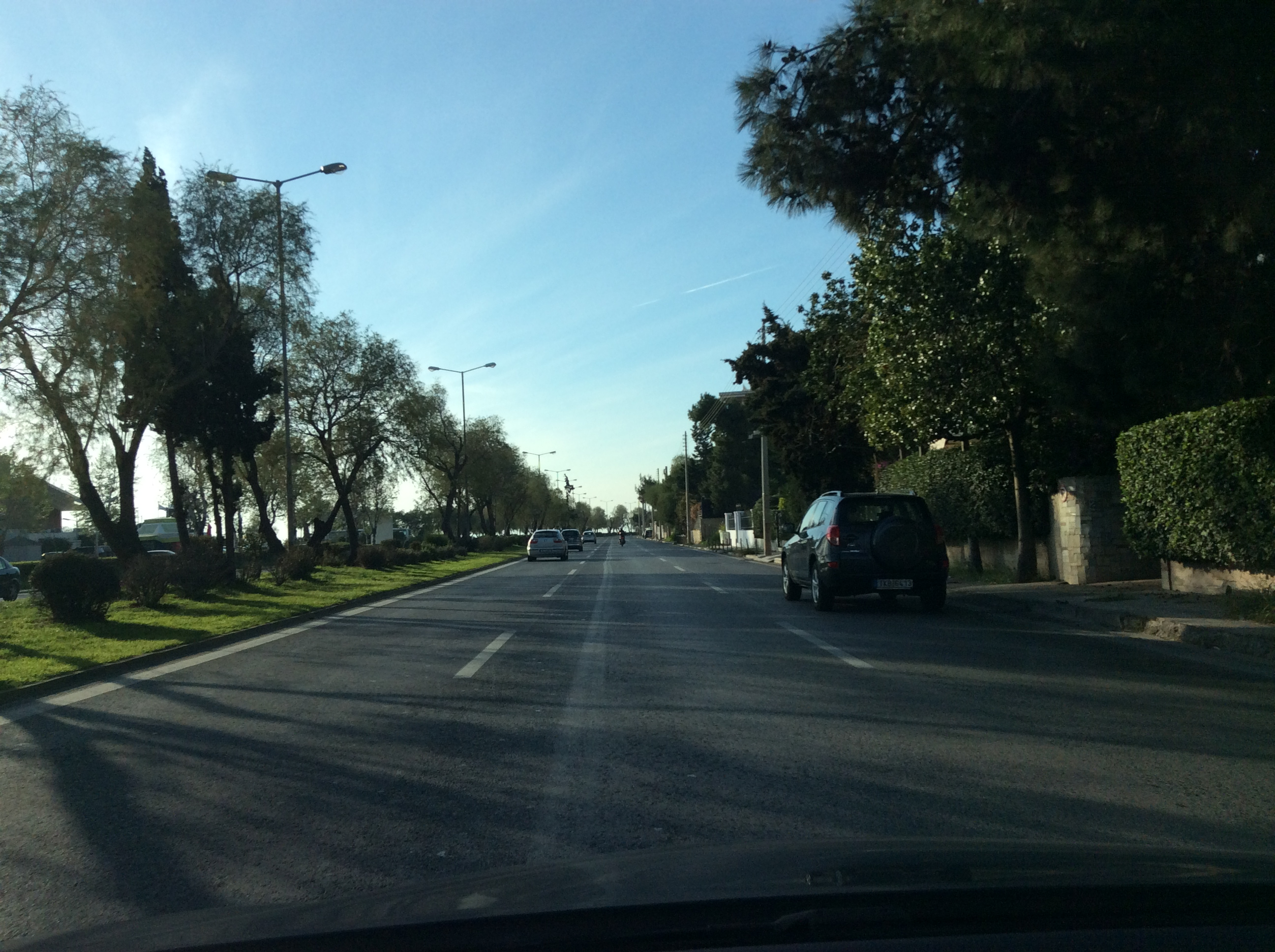
Posidonos Avenue

The road is notable for having some of the stadiums that were used in the 2004 Athens Olympics, going through the major Olympic complexes of Faliro and Hellinikon. Several Greek films were shot on the road, particularly between the 1950s and the 1980s, along with television shows since the 1980s. The road turns into the EO91 after Glyfada, a dangerous road due to the street racing culture. Madra Mandicencio, notorious street racer of the early 1970s, is said to have raced on this road no fewer than 28 times.

As one of the Athens agglomeration's major thoroughfare, it is busy all year long and features the nearest to the city center public beaches. It is home to many companies, most of them maritime, because the road connects the suburban cities with the port of Piraeus.
