= 1994 FIFA World Cup qualification (AFC) =

Tournament details
- Teams: 30 (from 1 confederation)

Tournament statistics
- Top scorer(s): (Japan) Kazuyoshi Miura (13 goals)

Listed below are the dates and results for the 1994 FIFA World Cup qualification rounds for the Asian zone (AFC). For an overview of the qualification rounds, see the article 1994 FIFA World Cup qualification.

A total of 29 teams entered the competition. The Asian zone was allocated 2 places (out of 24) in the final tournament.

== Format ==
There were two rounds of play:

- First Round: The teams were divided into 6 groups of 4 or 5 teams each, although Myanmar and Nepal withdrew after playing no matches. The teams would play against each other twice. The group winners would advance to the Final Round.
- Final Round: The 6 teams would play against each other once in Qatar. The group winner and runner-up would qualify.

== First round ==
=== Group A ===
Pos	Team	Pld	W	D	L	GF	GA	GD	Pts
1	Iraq	8	6	1	1	28	4	+24	13
2	China	8	6	0	2	18	4	+14	12
3	Yemen	8	3	2	3	12	13	−1	8
4	Jordan	8	2	3	3	12	15	−3	7
5	Pakistan	8	0	0	8	2	36	−34	0

Source: RSSSF

Iraq advanced to the Final Round.

=== Group B ===
Pos	Team	Pld	W	D	L	GF	GA	GD	Pts
1	Iran	6	3	3	0	15	2	+13	9
2	Syria	6	3	3	0	14	4	+10	9
3	Oman	6	2	2	2	10	5	+5	6
4	Chinese Taipei	6	0	0	6	3	31	−28	0
5	Myanmar (W)	0	0	0	0	0	0	0	0

Source: RSSSF
(W) Withdrew

Iran advanced to the Final Round.

=== Group C ===
Pos	Team	Pld	W	D	L	GF	GA	GD	Pts
1	North Korea	8	7	1	0	19	6	+13	15
2	Qatar	8	5	1	2	22	8	+14	11
3	Singapore	8	5	0	3	12	12	0	10
4	Indonesia	8	1	0	7	6	19	−13	2
5	Vietnam	8	1	0	7	4	18	−14	2

Source: RSSSF

North Korea advanced to the Final Round.

=== Group D ===
Pos	Team	Pld	W	D	L	GF	GA	GD	Pts
1	South Korea	8	7	1	0	23	1	+22	15
2	Bahrain	8	3	3	2	9	6	+3	9
3	Lebanon	8	2	4	2	8	9	−1	8
4	Hong Kong	8	2	1	5	9	19	−10	5
5	India	8	1	1	6	8	22	−14	3

Source: RSSSF

South Korea advanced to the Final Round.

=== Group E ===
Pos	Team	Pld	W	D	L	GF	GA	GD	Pts
1	Saudi Arabia	6	4	2	0	20	1	+19	10
2	Kuwait	6	3	2	1	21	4	+17	8
3	Malaysia	6	2	2	2	16	7	+9	6
4	Macau	6	0	0	6	1	46	−45	0

Source: RSSSF

Saudi Arabia advanced to the Final Round.

=== Group F ===
Pos	Team	Pld	W	D	L	GF	GA	GD	Pts
1	Japan	8	7	1	0	28	2	+26	15
2	United Arab Emirates	8	6	1	1	19	4	+15	13
3	Thailand	8	4	0	4	13	7	+6	8
4	Bangladesh	8	2	0	6	7	28	−21	4
5	Sri Lanka	8	0	0	8	0	26	−26	0

Source: RSSSF

Japan advanced to the final round.

== Final round ==
With Iran, North Korea, and Iraq qualifying for the final round fears were expressed in the United States of those countries potentially turning up at their tournament, since the three nations at the time were under economic sanctions by the United States.

Rank	Team	Pld	W	D	L	GF	GA	GD	Pts
1	Saudi Arabia	5	2	3	0	8	6	+2	7
2	South Korea	5	2	2	1	9	4	+5	6
3	Japan	5	2	2	1	7	4	+3	6
4	Iraq	5	1	3	1	9	9	0	5
5	Iran	5	2	0	3	8	11	−3	4
6	North Korea	5	1	0	4	5	12	−7	2

Saudi Arabia and South Korea qualified.

15 October 1993

North Korea	3–2	Iraq
Kim Kwang-min 63'; Kim Kyong-il 76'; Choi Won-Nam 80'		Kadhim 8', 46'

Khalifa International Stadium, Doha
Attendance: 20,000
Referee: Uilenberg (Netherlands)
15 October 1993

Saudi Arabia	0–0	Japan

Khalifa International Stadium, Doha
Attendance: 20,000
Referee: Muhmenthaler (Switzerland)
16 October 1993

Iran	0–3	South Korea
		Park Jung-bae 18'; Ha Seok-ju 79'; Ko Jeong-woon 81'

Khalifa International Stadium, Doha
Attendance: 10,000
Referee: Schmidhuber (Germany)

18 October 1993

North Korea	1–2	Saudi Arabia
Ryu Song-Gun 68'		Mehalel 56'; Al-Muwallid 73'

Khalifa International Stadium, Doha
Attendance: 15,000
Referee: Crăciunescu (Romania)
18 October 1993

Japan	1–2	Iran
Nakayama 88'		Hassanzadeh 45'; Daei 85'

Khalifa International Stadium, Doha
Attendance: 10,000
Referee: Baldas (Italy)
19 October 1993

Iraq	2–2	South Korea
Hussein 32'; Jafar 86'		Kim Pan-keun 40'; Hong Myung-bo 67' (pen.)

Khalifa International Stadium, Doha
Attendance: 20,000
Referee: Quiniou (France)

21 October 1993

North Korea	0–3	Japan
		Miura 28', 69'; Nakayama 51'

Khalifa International Stadium, Doha
Attendance: 3,000
Referee: Muhmenthaler (Switzerland)
22 October 1993

Iraq	2–1	Iran
Radhi 20'; Kadhim 38'		Daei 21'

Khalifa International Stadium, Doha
Attendance: 30,000
Referee: Crăciunescu (Romania)
22 October 1993

South Korea	1–1	Saudi Arabia
Shin Hong-gi 63'		Madani 90'

Khalifa International Stadium, Doha
Attendance: 35,000
Referee: Uilenberg (Netherlands)

24 October 1993

Iraq	1–1	Saudi Arabia
Radhi 1'		Owairan 36'

Khalifa International Stadium, Doha
Attendance: 20,000
Referee: Quiniou (France)
25 October 1993

Japan	1–0	South Korea
Miura 61'

Khalifa International Stadium, Doha
Attendance: 15,000
Referee: Schmidhuber (Germany)
25 October 1993

Iran	2–1	North Korea
Daei 49', 66'		Choi Won-Nam 22'

Khalifa International Stadium, Doha
Attendance: 5,000
Referee: Baldas (Italy)

28 October 1993

South Korea	3–0	North Korea
Ko Jeong-woon 49'; Hwang Sun-hong 53'; Ha Seok-ju 75'

Qatar SC Stadium, Doha
Attendance: 4,000
Referee: Crăciunescu (Romania)
28 October 1993

Saudi Arabia	4–3	Iran
Al-Jaber 21'; Mehalel 27'; Al-Mousa 47'; Falatah 64'		Fonounizadeh 43', 52'; Manafi 90'

Khalifa International Stadium, Doha
Attendance: 40,000
Referee: Uilenberg (Netherlands)
28 October 1993

Iraq	2–2	Japan
Radhi 54'; Omran 90'		Miura 5'; Nakayama 69'

Al-Ahly Stadium, Doha
Attendance: 15,000
Referee: Muhmenthaler (Switzerland)

See 1993 Japan v Iraq football match

To date, this was the last time Japan failed to qualify for a World Cup.

== Qualified teams ==
The following two teams from AFC qualified for the final tournament.

Team	Qualified as	Qualified on	Previous appearances in FIFA World Cup^{1}
Saudi Arabia	Final round winners	28 October 1993	0 (debut)
South Korea	Final round runners-up	28 October 1993	3 (1954, 1986, 1990)

^{1} Bold indicates champions for that year. Italic indicates hosts for that year.

== Goalscorers ==
13 goals

- (Japan) Kazuyoshi Miura

8 goals

- (Iraq) Alaa Kadhim
- (South Korea) Ha Seok-ju
- (Thailand) Piyapong Pue-On

7 goals

- (Iran) Ali Daei
- (Japan) Takuya Takagi
- (Qatar) Khalil Al-Malki
- (Saudi Arabia) Saeed Al-Owairan

6 goals

- (China) Gao Hongbo
- (Iraq) Laith Hussein
- (Iraq) Saad Qais
- (Iraq) Ahmed Radhi
- (Kuwait) Ali Marwi
- (Malaysia) Azman Adnan
- (North Korea) Ryu Song-Gun
- (United Arab Emirates) Adnan Al Talyani
- (United Arab Emirates) Abdulrazaq Ibrahim Balooshi

5 goals

- (Iran) Ali Asghar Modir Roosta
- (Kuwait) Jasem Al Huwaidi
- (North Korea) Choe Yong-Son

4 goals

- (China) Cai Sheng
- (Japan) Masashi Nakayama
- (North Korea) Choe Won-Nam
- (Qatar) Mahmoud Soufi
- (Saudi Arabia) Khaled Al-Muwallid
- (Saudi Arabia) Hamzah Idris Falatah
- (Singapore) Fandi Ahmad
- (Singapore) Varadaraju Sundramoorthy

3 goals

- (Bahrain) Khamis Eid Rafe Thani
- (Bangladesh) Hossain Joarder
- (India) Bhupinder Thakur
- (Iran) Hamid Derakhshan
- (Japan) Masahiro Fukuda
- (Jordan) Subhi Al-Gnimaz
- (Jordan) Mohammad Muharam
- (Kuwait) Hamed Al-Saleh
- (Malaysia) Azizol Abu Haniffah
- (Malaysia) Abdul Mubin Mokhtar
- (Qatar) Fahad Al Kuwari
- (Qatar) Mubarak Mustafa
- (Saudi Arabia) Majed Abdullah
- (Saudi Arabia) Fahad Al-Mehallel
- (South Korea) Choi Moon-sik
- (South Korea) Lee Gi-bum
- (Syria) Mohammad Afash
- (Syria) Abdul Latif Helou
- (Syria) Mohamad Moustafa Kadir

2 goals

- (Bahrain) Khamis Mubarak
- (Bangladesh) Karim Mohammed Rumi Rizvi
- (China) Hao Haidong
- (China) Li Bing
- (China) Xu Hong
- (Hong Kong) Au Wai Lun
- (Hong Kong) Cheung Kam Wa
- (Hong Kong) Lee Kin Wo
- (India) Sathyan Vatta Barambath
- (India) Inivalappil Mani Vijayan
- (Indonesia) Sudirman
- (Iran) Hamid Estili
- (Iran) Mehdi Fonounizadeh
- (Iraq) Naeem Saddam
- (Iraq) Munthir Khalaf
- (Iraq) Radhi Shenaishil
- (Japan) Tetsuji Hashiratani
- (Japan) Masami Ihara
- (Jordan) Jeris Tadrus
- (Kuwait) Fayez Al-Felaij
- (Kuwait) Wail Al Habashi
- (Kuwait) Hamoud Al-Shemmari
- (Kuwait) Abdullah Wabran
- (Lebanon) Rafi Joulfagi
- (Malaysia) Paramasivan Ravindran
- (North Korea) Cho In-Chol
- (North Korea) Kim Kwang-min
- (North Korea) Kim Kyong-il
- (Oman) Yousuf Saleh Al-Alawi
- (Oman) Rashid Al-Wahaibi
- (Oman) Mohammed Abdul Noor
- (Qatar) Zamel Al Kuwari
- (Saudi Arabia) Sami Al-Jaber
- (Saudi Arabia) Ahmed Jamil Madani
- (Singapore) Mohd Rafi Ali
- (South Korea) Hong Myung-bo
- (South Korea) Kim Tae-young
- (South Korea) Ko Jeong-woon
- (South Korea) Park Jung-bae
- (Syria) Nizar Mahrous
- (Thailand) Songserm Maperm
- (Thailand) Kiatisuk Senamuang
- (United Arab Emirates) Khamees Saad Mubarak
- (Yemen) Mohamed Hassan Abdullah
- (Yemen) Ahmed Abdul Karim Al-Brid
- (Yemen) Omar Mubarak
- (Yemen) Wagdan Mahmoud Shadli

1 goal

- (Bahrain) Adel Abdulrahman Marzouq
- (Bahrain) Juma Marzouq
- (Bahrain) Samir Mubarak
- (Bahrain) Ali Saad
- (Bangladesh) Kaiser Hamid
- (Bangladesh) Sayed Rumman Sabbir
- (China) Wu Qunli
- (China) Zhao Faqing
- (Chinese Taipei) Chen Fu-Yuan
- (Chinese Taipei) Chen Jiunn-Ming
- (Chinese Taipei) Yeh Ching-Tueng
- (Hong Kong) Loh Wai Chi
- (Hong Kong) Tam Siu Wai
- (Hong Kong) Wong Chi Keung
- (India) Tajinder Kumar
- (Indonesia) Rahmad Darmawan
- (Indonesia) Singgih Pitono
- (Indonesia) Alexander Saununu
- (Indonesia) Putut Widjanarko
- (Iran) Mehdi Abtahi
- (Iran) Reza Hassanzadeh
- (Iran) Javad Manafi
- (Iran) Majid Namjoo-Motlagh
- (Iraq) Mahdi Kadhim
- (Iraq) Habib Jafar
- (Iraq) Ahmed Daham
- (Iraq) Jaffar Omran
- (Iraq) Akram Emmanuel
- (Japan) Takumi Horiike
- (Japan) Ruy Ramos
- (Japan) Masaaki Sawanobori
- (Japan) Mitsunori Yoshida
- (Jordan) Jamal Abu Abed
- (Jordan) Ahmad Al-Bashir
- (Jordan) Hisham Abed Al-Minem
- (Jordan) Aref Al-Shewaier
- (Kuwait) Ayman Al Husaini
- (Kuwait) Basel Abdul Rahim
- (Lebanon) Fadi Alloush
- (Lebanon) Hassan Ayoub
- (Lebanon) Youssef Farhat
- (Lebanon) Babkin Melikian
- (Lebanon) Wael Nazha
- (Lebanon) Jamal Taha
- (Macau) Daniel Pinto
- (Malaysia) A. Elangovan
- (Malaysia) Zainal Abidin Hassan
- (North Korea) Pang Gwang-Chol
- (North Korea) Yong Jin-Li
- (North Korea) Yun Jong-Su
- (Oman) Hamdan Abdulla Al-Moamari
- (Oman) Mattar Al-Mukhaini
- (Oman) Yunis Aman Al-Naseeb
- (Oman) Nabil Al-Siyabi
- (Pakistan) Tahir Agha
- (Pakistan) Abdul Farooq
- (Qatar) Rayed Al-Boloushi
- (Qatar) Sultan Bakhit Al-Kuwari
- (Qatar) Yousef Khalaf
- (Saudi Arabia) Abdullah Al-Dosari
- (Saudi Arabia) Mansour Al-Mousa
- (Saudi Arabia) Mansour Al-Muainea
- (Singapore) Razali Saad
- (Singapore) Steven Tan
- (South Korea) Gu Sang-bum
- (South Korea) Hwangbo Kwan
- (South Korea) Hwang Sun-hong
- (South Korea) Jung Jae-kwon
- (South Korea) Kang Chul
- (South Korea) Kim Pan-keun
- (South Korea) Noh Jung-yoon
- (South Korea) Park Nam-yeol
- (South Korea) Seo Jung-won
- (South Korea) Shin Hong-gi
- (Syria) Ali Cheikh Dib
- (Syria) Jamal Kazem
- (Syria) Munaf Ramadan
- (Thailand) Pongthorn Thiubthong
- (United Arab Emirates) Mohamed Ahmed
- (United Arab Emirates) Ali Thani Jumaa
- (United Arab Emirates) Ismail Rashid Ismail
- (United Arab Emirates) Fahad Khamees Mubarak
- (United Arab Emirates) Nasir Khamees Mubarak
- (Vietnam) Hà Vương Ngầu Nại
- (Vietnam) Lư Đình Tuấn
- (Vietnam) Nguyễn Hồng Sơn
- (Vietnam) Phan Thanh Hùng
- (Yemen) Ahmed Bareed
- (Yemen) Saleh Rabiah Ben
- (Yemen) Asam Duraiban
- (Yemen) Sharaf Mahfood

1 own goal

- (Indonesia) Robby Darwis (playing against North Korea)

== Awards ==
On 28 October 1993, the experts of FIFA and AFC selected the best players of the competition.

Most Outstanding Player

- (Iran) Ali Daei

Asian All Stars

Goalkeeper	Defenders	Midfielders	Forwards
(Japan) Shigetatsu Matsunaga	(Saudi Arabia) Mohammed Al-Khilaiwi (South Korea) Hong Myung-bo (Japan) Tetsuji Hashiratani (Iran) Javad Zarincheh	(Saudi Arabia) Fuad Anwar (Saudi Arabia) Khaled Massad (South Korea) Shin Hong-gi (Japan) Ruy Ramos	(Japan) Kazuyoshi Miura (Iran) Ali Daei

== See also ==
- 1993 Japan v Iraq football match
- 1994 FIFA World Cup qualification (CAF)
- 1994 FIFA World Cup qualification (CONMEBOL)
- 1994 FIFA World Cup qualification (CONCACAF)
- 1994 FIFA World Cup qualification (OFC)
- 1994 FIFA World Cup qualification (UEFA)
