= 1994 FIFA World Cup qualification – AFC first round =

International football competition

The first round of AFC matches for 1994 FIFA World Cup qualification was played from 9 April to 7 July 1993, to determine the six teams which would play for the two available 1994 FIFA World Cup slots for AFC.

== Group stage ==
=== Group A ===
Pos	Team	Pld	W	D	L	GF	GA	GD	Pts
1	Iraq	8	6	1	1	28	4	+24	13
2	China	8	6	0	2	18	4	+14	12
3	Yemen	8	3	2	3	12	13	−1	8
4	Jordan	8	2	3	3	12	15	−3	7
5	Pakistan	8	0	0	8	2	36	−34	0

Iraq advanced to the Final Round.

22 May 1993

Jordan	1–1	Yemen
Subhi Al-Gnimaz 65'		Wagdan Mahmoud Shadli 72'

Al-Hassan Stadium, Irbid
Referee: Mohamed Al-Mulla Abdalaziz (United Arab Emirates)

22 May 1993

Pakistan	0–5	China
		Gao Hongbo 38'; Cai Sheng 55', 59', 82'; Hao Haidong 71'

Al-Hassan Stadium, Irbid
Attendance: 10,000
Referee: Ammar Ammar (Lebanon)

24 May 1993

Jordan	1–1	Iraq
Jeris Tadrus 16'		Khalaf 75'

Al-Hassan Stadium, Irbid
Referee: Pirom Anprasert (Thailand)

24 May 1993

Yemen	5–1	Pakistan
Omar Mubarak 20', 53'; Ahmed Bareed 77'; Wagdan Mahmoud Shadli 80'; Mohamed Hassan Abdullah 82'		Tahir Agha 12'

Al-Hassan Stadium, Irbid
Referee: Hossein Askari Milajerdi (Iran)

26 May 1993

Jordan	0–3	China
		Gao Hongbo 61'; Wu Qunli 66'; Cai Sheng 89'

Al-Hassan Stadium, Irbid
Referee: Hossein Askari Milajerdi (Iran)

26 May 1993

Yemen	1–6	Iraq
Asam Duraiban 16'		Hussein 1'; A.Kadhim 22', 76'; M.Kadhim 35'; Radhi 55'; Qais 73'

Al-Hassan Stadium, Irbid
Referee: Ammar Ammar (Lebanon)

28 May 1993

Pakistan	0–8	Iraq
		Hussein 12'; Qais 21', 70'; A.Kadhim 27', 75'; Radhi 44'; Khalaf 77'; Saddam 88'

Al-Hassan Stadium, Irbid
Referee: Mohamed Al-Mulla Abdalaziz (United Arab Emirates)

28 May 1993

Yemen	1–0	China
Saleh Rabiah Ben 62'

Al-Hassan Stadium, Irbid
Attendance: 800
Referee: Jamal Al Sharif (Syria)

30 May 1993

Jordan	3–1	Pakistan
Mohammad Muharam 8', 89'; Hisham Abdul-Munam 90'		Abdul Farooq 80'

Al-Hassan Stadium, Irbid
Referee: Jamal Al Sharif (Syria)

30 May 1993

Iraq	1–0	China
Radhi 55'

Al-Hassan Stadium, Irbid
Referee: Pirom Anprasert (Thailand)

12 June 1993

Yemen	1–1	Jordan
Sharaf Mahfood 52'		Aref Al-Shewaier 73'

Chengdu Sports Centre, Chengdu
Referee: Ali Mohamed Bujsaim (United Arab Emirates)

12 June 1993

China	3–0	Pakistan
Gao Hongbo 60', 89'; Hao Haidong 62'

Chengdu Sports Centre, Chengdu
Referee: Kim Jong Sik (North Korea)

14 June 1993

Iraq	4–0	Jordan
Hussein 3', 17'; Kadhim 25'; Radhi 52'

Chengdu Sports Centre, Chengdu
Referee: Masayoshi Okada (Japan)

14 June 1993

Pakistan	0–3	Yemen
		Ahmed Abdul Karim Al-Brid 39', 72'; Mohamed Hassan Abdullah 77'

Chengdu Sports Centre, Chengdu
Referee: An Bong-ki (South Korea)

16 June 1993

China	4–1	Jordan
Li Bing 16', 76'; Gao Hongbo 50', 80'		Jamal Abu Abed 56'

Chengdu Sports Centre, Chengdu
Referee: An Bong-ki (South Korea)

16 June 1993

Iraq	3–0	Yemen
Saddam 46'; Qais 64'; Hussein 80'

Chengdu Sports Centre, Chengdu
Referee: Santos Jose Manuel (Macau)

18 June 1993

Iraq	4–0	Pakistan
Qais 16', 67'; Shenaishil 37'; Daham 64'

Chengdu Sports Centre, Chengdu
Referee: Kim Jong Sik (North Korea)

18 June 1993

China	1–0	Yemen
Xu Hong 73'

Chengdu Sports Centre, Chengdu
Referee: Masayoshi Okada (Japan)

20 June 1993

Pakistan	0–5	Jordan
		Subhi Al-Gnimaz 14', 70'; Jeris Tadrus 28'; Mohammad Muharam 43'; Ahmad Al-Bashir 44'

Chengdu Sports Centre, Chengdu
Referee: Santos Jose Manuel (Macau)

20 June 1993

China	2–1	Iraq
Xu Hong 63'; Zhao Faqing 89'		Emmanuel 47'

Chengdu Sports Centre, Chengdu
Referee: Ali Mohamed Bujsaim (United Arab Emirates)

=== Group B ===
Pos	Team	Pld	W	D	L	GF	GA	GD	Pts
1	Iran	6	3	3	0	15	2	+13	9
2	Syria	6	3	3	0	14	4	+10	9
3	Oman	6	2	2	2	10	5	+5	6
4	Chinese Taipei	6	0	0	6	3	31	−28	0
5	Myanmar (W)	0	0	0	0	0	0	0	0

(W) Withdrew

Iran advanced to the Final Round.

23 June 1993

Iran	0–0	Oman

Azadi Stadium, Tehran, Iran

23 June 1993

Chinese Taipei	0–2	Syria
		Mohammad Afash 15'; Mohamad Moustafa Kadir 42'

Azadi Stadium, Tehran, Iran

25 June 1993

Oman	0–0	Syria

Tehran, Iran

25 June 1993

Iran	6–0	Chinese Taipei
Hamid Estili 18'; Modir Roosta 40', 46', 50', 75'; Ali Daei 43'

Tehran, Iran

27 June 1993

Oman	2–1	Chinese Taipei
Yousuf Saleh Al-Alawi 29'; Yunis Aman Al-Naseeb 35'		Chen Fu-Yuan 78'

Tehran, Iran

27 June 1993

Iran	1–1	Syria
Modir Roosta 63'		Abdul Latif Helou 82'

Tehran, Iran

2 July 1993

Oman	0–1	Iran
		Hamid Derakhshan 36'

Tehran, Iran

2 July 1993

Syria	8–1	Chinese Taipei
Abdul Latif Helou 3', 71'; Jamal Kazem 6'; Munaf Ramadan 12'; Ali Cheikh Dib 19' (pen.); Mohammad Afash 23', 45'; Nizar Mahrous 80'		Chen Jiunn-ming 39'

4 July 1993

Syria	2–1	Oman
Nizar Mahrous 45'; Mohamad Moustafa Kadir 62' (pen.)		Hamdan Abdulla Al-Moamari 57'

4 July 1993

Chinese Taipei	0–6	Iran
		Hamid Derakhshan 8'; Majid Namjoo-Motlagh 15' (pen.); Ali Daei 19', 48'; Mehdi Abtahi 22'; Hamid Estili 74'

7 July 1993

Chinese Taipei	1–7	Oman
Yeh Ching-Tueng 66'		Yousuf Saleh Al-Alawi 6'; Mohammed Abdul Noor 15', 88'; Rashid Al-Wahaibi 34', 82'; Mattar Al-Mukhaini 64'; Nabil Al-Siyabi 74'

7 July 1993

Syria	1–1	Iran
Mohamad Moustafa Kadir 89' (pen.)		Hamid Derakhshan 15'

=== Group C ===
Pos	Team	Pld	W	D	L	GF	GA	GD	Pts
1	North Korea	8	7	1	0	19	6	+13	15
2	Qatar	8	5	1	2	22	8	+14	11
3	Singapore	8	5	0	3	12	12	0	10
4	Indonesia	8	1	0	7	6	19	−13	2
5	Vietnam	8	1	0	7	4	18	−14	2

North Korea advanced to the Final Round.

9 April 1993

Qatar	3–1	Indonesia
Soufi 51', 79'; Al-Kuwari 55'		Singgih Pitono 85'

9 April 1993

North Korea	3–0	Vietnam
Yun Jong-Su 29'; Choe Yong-Son 85'; Ryu Song-Gun 86'

11 April 1993

North Korea	2–1	Singapore
Cho In-Chol 64'; Choe Won-Nam 75'		Sundramoorthy 33'

11 April 1993

Qatar	4–0	Vietnam
Mustafa 34'; Soufi 37'; Khalaf 50'; Al-Kuwari 60'

13 April 1993

North Korea	4–0	Indonesia
Ryu Song-Gun 19'; Choe Yong-Son 42', 58'; Robby Darwis 77' (o.g.)

13 April 1993

Vietnam	2–3	Singapore
Lư Đình Tuấn 14'; Phan Thanh Hùng 77'		Fandi Ahmad 19'; Steven Tan 35' (pen.); Sundramoorthy 73'

16 April 1993

Qatar	4–1	Singapore
Mustafa 70', 90' (pen.); Soufi 84'; Al-Malki 89'		Fandi Ahmad 58'

16 April 1993

Vietnam	1–0	Indonesia
Hà Vương Ngầu Nại 61'

18 April 1993

Indonesia	0–2	Singapore
		Mohd Rafi Ali 75'; Sundramoorthy 83'

18 April 1993

Qatar	1–2	North Korea
Al-Malki 89'		Ryu Song-Gun 49', 57'

24 April 1993

Indonesia	1–4	Qatar
Sudirman 28' (pen.)		Al-Malki 35', 61'; Al-Kuwari 75'; Z. Al Kuwari 83'

24 April 1993

Vietnam	0–1	North Korea
		Yong Jin-Li 61'

26 April 1993

Singapore	1–3	North Korea
Razali Saad 72'		Choe Won-Nam 26'; Choe Yong-Son 41', 76'

26 April 1993

Vietnam	0–4	Qatar
		Al-Malki 7'; Z. Al-Kuwari 13'; Al-Kuwari 52' (pen.); Al-Boloushi 65'

28 April 1993

Indonesia	1–2	North Korea
Rahmad Darmawan 35'		Pang Gwang-Chol 4'; Ryu Song-Gun 68'

28 April 1993

Singapore	1–0	Vietnam
Mohd Rafi Ali 54'

30 April 1993

Singapore	1–0	Qatar
Fandi Ahmad 80'

30 April 1993

Indonesia	2–1	Vietnam
Putut Widjanarko 55'; Sudirman 75'		Nguyễn Hồng Sơn 30'

2 May 1993

Singapore	2–1	Indonesia
Fandi Ahmad 70'; Sundramoorthy 85'		Alexander Saununu 2'

2 May 1993

North Korea	2–2	Qatar
Cho In-Chol 40'; Kim Kyong-Il 55'		Al-Malki 1', 86'

=== Group D ===
Pos	Team	Pld	W	D	L	GF	GA	GD	Pts
1	South Korea	8	7	1	0	23	1	+22	15
2	Bahrain	8	3	3	2	9	6	+3	9
3	Lebanon	8	2	4	2	8	9	−1	8
4	Hong Kong	8	2	1	5	9	19	−10	5
5	India	8	1	1	6	8	22	−14	3

South Korea advanced to the Final Round.

7 May 1993

Lebanon	2–2	India
Babkin Melikian 37'; Jamal Taha 53'		Tejinder Kumar 68'; V. P. Sathyan 82'

Bourj Hammoud Stadium, Beirut, Lebanon
Referee: Nizar Watti (Syria)

7 May 1993

Hong Kong	2–1	Bahrain
Cheung Kam Wa 20'; Au Wai Lun 57'		Juma Marzouq 44'

Bourj Hammoud Stadium, Beirut, Lebanon

9 May 1993

Bahrain	0–0	South Korea

Bourj Hammoud Stadium, Beirut, Lebanon

9 May 1993

Lebanon	2–2	Hong Kong
Rafi Joulfagi 43'; Fadi Alloush 80' (pen.)		Tam Siu Wai 13'; Cheung Kam Wa 19'

Bourj Hammoud Stadium, Beirut, Lebanon

11 May 1993

India	1–2	Hong Kong
Bhupinder Thakur 54'		Loh Wai Chi 15'; Lee Kin Wo 59'

Bourj Hammoud Stadium, Beirut, Lebanon
Referee: Qazi Asif (Pakistan)

11 May 1993

Lebanon	0–1	South Korea
		Ha Seok-ju 17'

Bourj Hammoud Stadium, Beirut, Lebanon

13 May 1993

Lebanon	0–0	Bahrain

Bourj Hammoud Stadium, Beirut, Lebanon

13 May 1993

India	0–3	South Korea
		Hong Myung-bo 19' (pen.); Choi Moon-sik 70'; Ha Seok-ju 89'

Bourj Hammoud Stadium, Beirut, Lebanon
Referee: Al-Hindyani (Kuwait)

15 May 1993

Hong Kong	0–3	South Korea
		Ha Seok-ju 21'; Seo Jung-won 50'; Choi Moon-sik 73'

Bourj Hammoud Stadium, Beirut, Lebanon

15 May 1993

Bahrain	2–1	India
Khamis Thani 4'; Saad 31'		V. P. Sathyan 90' (pen.)

Bourj Hammoud Stadium, Beirut, Lebanon
Referee: Qazi Asif (Pakistan)

5 June 1993

South Korea	4–1	Hong Kong
Choi Moon-sik 12'; Jung Jae-kwon 76'; Ha Seok-ju 81'; Noh Jung-yoon 85'		Au Wai Lun 21'

5 June 1993

Bahrain	0–0	Lebanon

7 June 1993

India	0–3	Bahrain
		Khamis Mubarak 20', 53'; Khamis Thani 54'

Referee: Shariff (Singapore)

7 June 1993

South Korea	2–0	Lebanon
Ha Seok-ju 31'; Hwangbo Kwan 56'

9 June 1993

Hong Kong	1–2	Lebanon
Lee Kin Wo 17'		Youssef Farhat 38'; Wael Nazha 76'

9 June 1993

South Korea	7–0	India
Lee Gi-bum 5', 25', 49'; Kim Tae-young 37', 70'; Park Jung-bae 39'; Ha Seok-ju 68'

Referee: Al-Yenbua'awy (Saudi Arabia)

11 June 1993

India	1–2	Lebanon
Bhupinder Thakur 34'		Hassan Ayoub 41'; Rafi Joulfagi 79'

Referee: Wei Jihong (China)

11 June 1993

Bahrain	3–0	Hong Kong
Adel Abdulrahman Marzouq 1'; Samir Mubarak 46'; Khamis Thani 49'

13 June 1993

South Korea	3–0	Bahrain
Kang Chul 51'; Park Nam-yeol 63'; Gu Sang-bum 85'

13 June 1993

Hong Kong	1–3	India
Wong Chi Keung 66'		I. M. Vijayan 6', 77'; Bhupinder Thakur 55'

Referee: Ali (Iraq)

=== Group E ===
Pos	Team	Pld	W	D	L	GF	GA	GD	Pts
1	Saudi Arabia	6	4	2	0	20	1	+19	10
2	Kuwait	6	3	2	1	21	4	+17	8
3	Malaysia	6	2	2	2	16	7	+9	6
4	Macau	6	0	0	6	1	46	−45	0
5	Nepal (W)	0	0	0	0	0	0	0	0

(W) Withdrew

Saudi Arabia advanced to the Final Round.

1 May 1993

Macau	0–6	Saudi Arabia
		Sami Al-Jaber 12'; Saeed Al-Owairan 21', 24'; Abdullah Al-Dosari 65'; Fahad Al-Mehallel 68'; Khaled Al-Muwallid 79' (pen.)

1 May 1993

Malaysia	1–1	Kuwait
Azman Adnan 59'		Ayman Al Husaini 8'

3 May 1993

Macau	1–10	Kuwait
Daniel Pinto 76'		Ali Marwi 22', 24', 55', 87'; Hamed Al-Saleh 61', 65'; Jasem Al Huwaidi 71', 72', 81'; Basel Abdul Rahim 84' (pen.)

3 May 1993

Malaysia	1–1	Saudi Arabia
Abdul Mubin Mokhtar 31'		Khaled Al-Muwallid 88' (pen.)

5 May 1993

Kuwait	0–0	Saudi Arabia

5 May 1993

Malaysia	9–0	Macau
Azman Adnan 6', 14', 74'; Azizol Abu Haniffah 32', 75'; A. Elangovan 42'; Abdul Mubin Mokhtar 47', 54'; Zainal Abidin Hassan 87'

14 May 1993

Kuwait	2–0	Malaysia
Abdullah Saihan 11'; Ali Marwi 18'

14 May 1993

Saudi Arabia	8–0	Macau
Hamzah Idris Falatah 8', 25', 85'; Khaled Al-Muwallid 22' (pen.); Saeed Owairan 37', 56', 79'; Mansour Al-Muainea 40'

16 May 1993

Kuwait	8–0	Macau
Ali Marwi 11'; Abdullah Saihan 44'; Jasem Al Huwaidi 52', 60'; Hamed Al-Saleh 54'; Wail Al Habashi 81'; Hamoud Al-Shemmari 84'; Fayez Al-Felaij 90'

16 May 1993

Saudi Arabia	3–0	Malaysia
Majed Abdullah 9', 64'; Ahmad Jamil Madani 58'

18 May 1993

Macau	0–5	Malaysia
		Azman Adnan 10', 43'; Azizol Abu Haniffah 74'; Paramasivan Ravindran 77', 85'

18 May 1993

Saudi Arabia	2–0	Kuwait
Saeed Owairan 23'; Majed Abdullah 89'

=== Group F ===
Pos	Team	Pld	W	D	L	GF	GA	GD	Pts
1	Japan	8	7	1	0	28	2	+26	15
2	United Arab Emirates	8	6	1	1	19	4	+15	13
3	Thailand	8	4	0	4	13	7	+6	8
4	Bangladesh	8	2	0	6	7	28	−21	4
5	Sri Lanka	8	0	0	8	0	26	−26	0

Japan advanced to the Final Round.

8 April 1993

Japan	1–0	Thailand
Miura 29'

Kobe Universiade Memorial Stadium, Kobe, Japan

8 April 1993

Sri Lanka	0–4	United Arab Emirates
		Ali Thani Jumaa 21'; Adnan Al Talyani 24'; Khamees Mubarak 56', 88'

11 April 1993

Japan	8–0	Bangladesh
Miura 18', 44', 52', 53'; Takagi 25', 57'; Fukuda 58', 88'

Tokyo National Stadium, Tokyo, Japan

11 April 1993

Thailand	1–0	Sri Lanka
Kiatisuk 62'

13 April 1993

Sri Lanka	0–1	Bangladesh
		Rizvi Karim Rumi 69'

13 April 1993

Thailand	0–1	United Arab Emirates
		Abdulrazaq Balooshi 86'

15 April 1993

Japan	5–0	Sri Lanka
Takagi 10', 49'; Hashiratani 18'; Miura 34', 51'

Tokyo National Stadium, Tokyo, Japan

15 April 1993

Bangladesh	0–1	United Arab Emirates
		Abdulrazaq Balooshi 56'

18 April 1993

Japan	2–0	United Arab Emirates
Hashiratani 20'; Takagi 76'

Tokyo National Stadium, Tokyo, Japan

18 April 1993

Thailand	4–1	Bangladesh
Songserm 20'; Piyapong 21', 58', 88'		Mamun Joarder 84'

28 April 1993

Thailand	0–1	Japan
		Horiike 49'

Al Maktoum Stadium, Dubai, United Arab Emirates

28 April 1993

United Arab Emirates	3–0	Sri Lanka
Adnan Al Talyani 40', 54'; Ismail Rashid Ismail 89'

30 April 1993

Bangladesh	1–4	Japan
Rumi 11'		Fukuda 2'; Miura 30'; Yoshida 36'; Takagi 61'

Al Maktoum Stadium, Dubai, United Arab Emirates

30 April 1993

United Arab Emirates	2–1	Thailand
Abdulrazaq Balooshi 10' (pen.); Adnan Al Talyani 63'		Songserm 90'

3 May 1993

United Arab Emirates	7–0	Bangladesh
Adnan Al Talyani 4', 65'; Abdulrazaq Balooshi 26', 59'; Fahad Khamees 28'; Nasir Khamees 38'; Mohamed Ahmed 74'

3 May 1993

Sri Lanka	0–3	Thailand
		Piyapong 27', 37', 71' (pen.)

5 May 1993

Bangladesh	1–4	Thailand
Sayed Rumman Sabbir 72'		Piyapong 20', 52'; Kiatisuk 26'; Pongthorn 54'

5 May 1993

Sri Lanka	0–6	Japan
		Ramos 31'; Ihara 42', 56'; Takagi 61'; Miura 80'; Nakayama 82'

Al Maktoum Stadium, Dubai, United Arab Emirates

7 May 1993

Bangladesh	3–0	Sri Lanka
Mamun Joarder 8', 78'; Kaiser Hamid 73' (pen.)

7 May 1993

United Arab Emirates	1–1	Japan
Balooshi 83'		Sawanobori 84'

Khalifa bin Zayed Stadium, Dubai, United Arab Emirates

== Teams qualified for final round ==
With all of Iran, North Korea and Iraq qualifying for the final round fears were expressed in the United States of those countries potentially turning up at their tournament, since the three nations at the time were under economic sanctions by the United States.

- Saudi Arabia
- South Korea
- Japan
- Iraq
- Iran
- North Korea
