= Japan v Iraq (1994 FIFA World Cup qualification) =

Coordinates: 25°15′06″N 51°32′07″E

Japan v Iraq (1993)
Agony of Doha (ドーハの悲劇) Miracle of Doha (도하의 기적)
- Event: 1994 FIFA World Cup Asian qualifiers Matchday 5
Japan	Iraq
(Japan)	(Iraq)
2	2
- Japan and Iraq failed to qualify for the 1994 FIFA World Cup, allowing South Korea to qualify instead.
- Date: 28 October 1993; 33 years ago
- Venue: Al-Ahli Stadium, Doha
- Referee: Serge Muhmenthaler (Switzerland)
- Attendance: 4,000

In the final round of matches of the final round of Asian qualification for the 1994 FIFA World Cup, Japan and Iraq drew 2–2 in Doha, Qatar. If Japan had won the match, they would have qualified for the World Cup for the first time. Instead, Japan finished third in their group, allowing their arch-rivals South Korea to qualify instead. The Japanese refer to the match as the "Agony of Doha" (Japanese: ドーハの悲劇, romanized: Dōha no higeki), (Note: The word-for-word translation of Dōha no higeki would be "Tragedy of Doha", but the "agony" translation is used more commonly in English-language commentary.) whereas South Koreans, because the country only qualified in the final minutes of this match, refer to it as the "Miracle of Doha" (Korean: 도하의 기적, romanized: Doha-ui gijeok).

The failure to qualify for the World Cup and the dramatic way in which it happened caused great disappointment for Japanese fans. Football had become popular in Japan with the launch of the professional J.League earlier that year and the team had never been that close to qualifying for the World Cup. Although Japan has since qualified for eight consecutive World Cup finals (even co-hosting one), team members from this match are still known as the "Class of Doha" (ドーハ組, Dōha gumi) and the phrase "Never forget Doha" (ドーハを忘れるな, Dōha o wasureruna) remains a rallying cry for fans.

== Before the match ==
Six nations (Japan, South Korea, Saudi Arabia, Iraq, Iran, and North Korea) competed in the final round of Asian qualification for two places at the 1994 World Cup in the United States. The six finalists played each other in Doha, Qatar in a round robin format of matches that were held between 15 and 28 October 1993. After four rounds of matches and with two points for a victory (instead of three) for each team, the standings were as follows:

Team	Pts	Pld	W	D	L	GF	GA	GD
Japan	5	4	2	1	1	5	2	3
Saudi Arabia	5	4	1	3	0	4	3	1
South Korea	4	4	1	2	1	6	4	2
Iraq	4	4	1	2	1	7	7	0
Iran	4	4	2	0	2	5	7	–2
North Korea	2	4	1	0	3	5	9	–4

(Win = 2 points, draw = 1 point, loss = 0 points; tie broken by goal difference)

In the 4th round of matches, Japan defeated South Korea 1–0 taking first place in the standings going into the final match. Although just one point separated the 1st and 5th spots and only North Korea had been eliminated, Japan would have qualified for the finals with a win regardless of any other results. Japan still would have qualified with a draw as long as either South Korea or Saudi Arabia failed to win its last match and Iran did not defeat Saudi Arabia by more than four goals.

== Match ==
=== Summary ===
The match was held on 28 October 1993, simultaneously with the rest of the fifth round of matches, South Korea vs North Korea and Saudi Arabia vs Iran, held in other venues in Doha.

Japan opened the scoring from a first-half goal by Kazuyoshi Miura, but Iraq's Ahmed Radhi scored the equaliser ten minutes into the second half. Japan again took the lead with a goal from Masashi Nakayama. The 2–1 score stood as the match approached the 90th minute.

The matches at the other venues had ended earlier, with South Korea beating North Korea 3–0 and Saudi Arabia beating Iran 4–3. This meant Japan would have to hold onto the score in order to qualify for the World Cup, with the combination of results eliminating South Korea.

However, Japan gave the ball up to Iraq, and just after the match entered stoppage time, Jaffar Omran scored a goal through a corner kick, tying the score at 2–2. The referee blew the final whistle and finished the match moments after this, eliminating both teams.

=== Details ===
28 October 1993
16:15 UTC+03:00

Japan	2–2	Iraq
Miura 5'; Nakayama 69'	(FIFA Report)	Radhi 55'; Omran 90+1'

Al-Ahli Stadium, Doha
Attendance: 4,000
Referee: Serge Muhmenthaler (Switzerland)

Japan	Iraq

GK	1	Shigetatsu Matsunaga	(yellow card) 84'
RB	4	Takumi Horiike
CB	7	Masami Ihara
CB	3	Toshinobu Katsuya	(yellow card) 10'
LB	5	Tetsuji Hashiratani (c)
CM	17	Hajime Moriyasu
CM	15	Mitsunori Yoshida
RW	16	Masashi Nakayama		(substituted off) 81'
AM	10	Ruy Ramos
LW	12	Kenta Hasegawa		(substituted off) 59'
CF	11	Kazuyoshi Miura
Substitutes:
FW	8	Masahiro Fukuda		(substituted on) 59'
FW	9	Nobuhiro Takeda		(substituted on) 81'
Manager:
(Netherlands) Hans Ooft

GK	21	Ibrahim Salim Saad
RB	2	Samir Kadhim
CB	4	Radhi Shenaishil	(yellow card) 23'
CB	14	Salim Hussein
LB	3	Saad Abdul-Hameed	(yellow card) 80'
MF	12	Mohamed Jassim Mahdi		(substituted off) 46'
MF	17	Laith Hussein
MF	18	Munthir Khalaf
MF	22	Bassam Raouf		(substituted off) 71'
SS	9	Alaa Kadhim
CF	8	Ahmed Radhi (c)
Substitutes:
FW	16	Jaffar Omran		(substituted on) 46'
DF	5	Jabbar Hashim		(substituted on) 71'
Manager:
Ammo Baba

== Results ==
After the final round of matches, the standings looked as follows:

Team	Pts	Pld	W	D	L	GF	GA	GD
Saudi Arabia	7	5	2	3	0	8	6	2
South Korea	6	5	2	2	1	9	4	5
Japan	6	5	2	2	1	7	4	3
Iraq	5	5	1	3	1	9	9	0
Iran	4	5	2	0	3	8	11	–3
North Korea	2	5	1	0	4	5	12	–7

Saudi Arabia took first place with their 4–3 victory over Iran. Japan and South Korea were even on points, but South Korea held the goal difference advantage after the three-goal victory over North Korea, winning the tie-breaker.

South Korea would tie in subsequent matches against Iraq (2–2) and Saudi Arabia (1–1) and lost a match against Japan (0–1). Had Japan won this match against Iraq, South Korea would have been eliminated even if they won the match against North Korea held on the same day. But as Japan and Iraq tied in the last minute, South Korea qualified and the match was dubbed a "miracle" by South Korean media.

Dutch coach Hans Ooft was sacked weeks after the match and the elimination effectively ended World Cup aspirations for the majority of the team, most notably Ruy Ramos and Miura, Japan's top scorer in the campaign, even though the latter would play an important part in the following qualifying campaign as well, scoring 14 goals in 13 matches. Only two Japanese players who appeared in the match, Nakayama and Masami Ihara, would go on to appear in Japan's 1998 FIFA World Cup squad, with the former appearing in the 2002 edition on home soil as well.

== Aftermath ==
After missing the 1994 edition, Japan eventually qualified for the 1998 FIFA World Cup, before hosting the 2002 FIFA World Cup along with their rival South Korea. The South Koreans dramatically beat Portugal, Italy, and Spain and ended in 4th place while Japan was eliminated in the Round of 16. Both teams lost to Turkey. It was the first time for both teams to reach the knockout phase.

Having since consolidated themselves as powerhouses of Asian football, they also qualified for every single FIFA World Cup edition since then, reaching the Round of 16 in four editions: in 2010, 2018, 2022 and 2026. However, in each of these occasions, Japan got eliminated in dramatic fashion. They first lost to Paraguay in 2010 in a penalty shoot-out, and then lost to Belgium in 2018 by 3-2 after conceding in the fourth minute of stoppage time after a Belgian counter-attack following a Japanese corner kick; the Japanese were leading 2–0 until the 69th minute. In 2022, Japan returned to Qatar to the 2022 FIFA World Cup and qualified in the group stage defeating Germany and Spain, however they got knocked out again in the Round of 16, this time taking the lead against Croatia but falling in another penalty shoot-out that ensued after a 1–1 draw.

For Iraq, this failure is just one part of the much larger World Cup drought. In comparison to the increasing success of the Japanese side, Iraq has repeatedly missed the opportunity to qualify for every World Cup until finally succeeding in 2026 by defeating Bolivia in the inter-confederation play-offs in Monterrey, Mexico, ending a 40-year drought (since 1986). In addition, sectarian conflicts and internal turmoil have prevented Iraq from achieving a greater status in Asian football. Since this game as well, Iraq has not beaten Japan in a competitive match until 2024, when Iraq beat Japan 2-1 at the 2023 AFC Asian Cup. Iraq also suffered a losing streak to Japan since this game, starting with a 1–4 defeat at the 2000 AFC Asian Cup (which was Japan's first win over Iraq), until 2017 when Iraq drew Japan 1–1 to end the country's losing streak.

=== Japan in neutral site qualifiers ===
Beginning with qualifiers for the 1998 World Cup, AFC has used home-and-away round robin format for its final qualifying round, instead of the single-venue format used in 1993. However, in two of the subsequent World Cup qualifying campaigns, Japan have determined its World Cup fate in neutral site matches.

In 1997, Japan and Iran finished second in their respective qualifying groups for the 1998 World Cup and met in the third round play-off on 16 November 1997 in Johor Bahru, Malaysia. The match would decide the third and last automatic qualifying spot for Asian teams and the loser would face Oceania's representative Australia in a two-legged play-off. Unlike the match four years before, Japan fell behind in the second half, but scored a late equaliser and eventually won 3–2 through a golden goal in extra time, earning the nation its ticket to France. This match was known as the "Joy of Johor Bahru" (ジョホール・バルの歓喜, Johōru Baru no kanki) in reference to the Agony of Doha.

On 8 June 2005, Japan defeated North Korea 2–0 to qualify for the 2006 World Cup in Germany. Although this match was scheduled as a home match for North Korea, it was moved to Bangkok, Thailand and held behind closed doors as punishment for crowd violence in a previous match held in Pyongyang.
