= Football derbies in Greece =

This is a list of the main association football rivalries in Greece.

- Athens derbies
  - Derbies between 'The Big Three'
    - Derby of the eternal enemies: Olympiacos vs. Panathinaikos
    - Athenian derby: AEK Athens vs. Panathinaikos
    - A.E.K.–Olympiacos rivalry: AEK Athens vs. Olympiacos
  - West Athens derby: Egaleo vs. Atromitos
  - Smyrna derby: Apollon Smyrnis vs. Panionios
  - South Athens derby: Athens Kallithea vs. Panionios
  - Panionios-Atromitos derby: Panionios vs. Atromitos Peristeri
  - AEK Athens-Apollon rivalry: Apollon Smyrnis vs. AEK Athens
  - Any match between Panionios and either AEK Athens or Panathinaikos.
  - Piraeus derbies:
    - Piraeus Derby: Ethnikos Piraeus vs. Olympiacos
    - Kokkinia derby: Proodeftiki vs. Ionikos
    - Ethnikos-Proodeftiki rivalry: Ethnikos Piraeus vs. Proodeftiki
- Thessaloniki Derbies
  - Derby of Thessaloniki: Aris vs. PAOK
  - Iraklis vs. Aris or PAOK
  - Apollon Kalamarias vs. Agrotikos Asteras
- Athens-Thessaloniki rivalry
  - Double-headed eagles derby: AEK Athens vs. PAOK
  - Olympiacos–PAOK rivalry: PAOK vs. Olympiacos
  - Panathinaikos–PAOK rivalry: Panathinaikos vs. PAOK
  - Aris vs. AEK Athens or Olympiacos or Panathinaikos
- Larissa Derbies
  - AEL vs. Apollon Larissa or Iraklis Larissa
- Volos derby: Niki Volos vs. Olympiacos Volos
- Cretan derby: Ergotelis vs. OFI
- West Thessaly derby: Anagennisi Karditsa vs. Trikala F.C.
- Thessaly derby: AEL vs. Niki Volos or Olympiacos Volos
- Karditsa derby: A.O. Karditsa vs. Anagennisi Karditsa
- West Peloponnese derby: Kalamata vs. Paniliakos or Messiniakos
- East Macedonia derby: Doxa Drama vs. Kavala
- Rhodes derby: Rodos vs. Diagoras
- Imathia derby: Veria vs. Naoussa or Pontioi Veria
- Epirus derby: PAS Giannina vs. Anagennisi Arta or Kerkyra or Preveza or Panetolikos
- Aetolia Akarnania derby: Panetolikos vs. A.E. Messolonghi
- Arcadia derby: Astera Tripolis vs. Panarkadikos
- East Peloponnese derby: Panargiakos vs. Panarkadikos
- Drama derby: Doxa Drama vs. Pandramaikos
- Achaea derby: Panachaiki vs. Panegialios
- Pieria derby: Pierikos vs. A.E. Karitsa or Ethnikos Katerini
- Chania derby: Chania vs. Platanias
- Messinia derby: Erani Filiatra vs Pamisos Messini
