= Qazi Asif =

Pakistani former footballer and FIFA referee

Personal information
- Full name: Qazi Muhammad Asif
- Date of birth: 7 May 1950 (age 76)
- Place of birth: Peshawar, Pakistan
- Position: Midfielder

Senior career*
Years	Team	Apps	(Gls)
1973	Kickers Club		
1973–1978	Warsak FC		
1978–1985	National Bank		

International career
1981–1985	Pakistan		
- * Club domestic league appearances and goals

Qazi Muhammad Asif (born 7 May 1950) is a Pakistani former footballer who played as midfielder, and former FIFA referee. Asif played for the Pakistan national football team from 1981 to 1985, and was a member of the FIFA refereeing panel from 1988 to 1996.

== Early life ==
Asif was born on 7 May 1950 in Peshawar, Pakistan.

== Playing career ==
After representing his school and college football teams, Asif joined Kickers Club in 1973, and later represented Warsak FC Peshawar for five years.

At domestic level, Asif played for National Bank from 1978 to 1985 at the National Football Championship. He first received his international call up from Pakistan for the 1981 King's Cup held in Thailand, and featured at the 1982 Quaid-e-Azam International Tournament the next year, where he played as starter against Nepal. He was again called for the 1985 Quaid-e-Azam International Tournament held in Peshawar.

== Refereeing career ==
Asif was a member of the FIFA refereeing panel for eight years, from 1988 to 1996. In 1993, he was also present at the 1994 FIFA World Cup qualification, where he was the head referee in two matches of India against Hong Kong and Bahrain in 11 May and 15 May respectively. He also controlled women football matches at the 1990 Asian Games in Beijing. Asif has supervised 43 international matches including women matches throughout his career.

== Post-retirement ==
After his retirement as referee, Asif remained unopposed chairman of the Pakistan Football Referee Association (PFRA) for 24 years. He also served as chief match commissioner for domestic matches in Pakistan. In 2018, he was removed from his post as chairman through no-confidence motion.

== Awards ==
In 2013, Asif was awarded honorary AFC Gold Service award by the Pakistan Football Federation, on behalf of the Asian Football Confederation (AFC) for his contributions to the game as a player and referee.
