= Mohammad Afash =

Syrian footballer (born 1966)

Personal information
- Full name: Mohammad Nasser Afash
- Date of birth: 31 October 1966 (age 59)
- Place of birth: Aleppo, Syria
- Position: Midfielder

Senior career*
| Years | Team | Apps | (Gls) |
| 1988–1993 | Al-Ittihad Aleppo | | |
| 1993–1996 | Proodeftiki | 89 | (28) |
| 1996–2004 | Ionikos | 196 | (19) |
| 2004–2005 | Al-Ittihad Aleppo | | |

International career
| 1989–2004 | Syria | 27 | (9) |
- * Club domestic league appearances and goals

Mohammad Nasser Afash (Arabic: محمد عفش; born 31 October 1966) is a Syrian retired footballer, who played as a midfielder. He started his career for Al-Ittihad Aleppo, before moving to Greece, where he spent 11 years for rivals Proodeftiki and Ionikos. He finished his career with Al-Ittihad Aleppo. Afash has represented Syria, getting capped 27 times and scoring 9 goals.

== Club career ==
Afash is one of the most notable Syrian football exports. Beginning his career with Al-Ittihad, he moved to Greece in 1993 to play for Proodeftiki before joining Ionikos in the 1996–97 season. He returned to Al-Ittihad in 2004.

== International career ==
Afash made seven appearances for the senior Syria national football team in qualifying matches for the 1994 and 1998 FIFA World Cup. He was a member of the Syria squad at the 1996 AFC Asian Cup finals.

He also played for Syria at the 1989 and 1991 FIFA World Youth Championship

== Career statistics ==
=== International ===
Scores and results list Syria's goal tally first, score column indicates score after each Afash goal.

List of international goals scored by Mohammad Afash
| No. | Date | Venue | Opponent | Score | Result | Competition |
|---|---|---|---|---|---|---|
| 1 | 2 July 1993 | Abbasiyyin Stadium, Damascus, Syria | Taiwan | 5–0 | 8–1 | 1994 FIFA World Cup qualification |
| 2 | 2 July 1993 | Abbasiyyin Stadium, Damascus, Syria | Taiwan | 6–0 | 8–1 | 1994 FIFA World Cup qualification |
| 3 | 19 August 1999 | Amman International Stadium, Amman, Jordan | Oman | 1–0 | 1–1 | 1999 Arab Games |
| 4 | 23 August 1999 | Amman International Stadium, Amman, Jordan | Libya | 1–0 | 1–1 | 1999 Arab Games |
| 5 | 25 August 1999 | Amman International Stadium, Amman, Jordan | United Arab Emirates | 2–1 | 2–2 | 1999 Arab Games |
| 6 | 30 April 2001 | Al-Hamadaniah Stadium, Aleppo, Syria | Philippines | 9–0 | 12–0 | 2002 FIFA World Cup qualification |
| 7 | 7 May 2001 | Al-Hamadaniah Stadium, Aleppo, Syria | Laos | 1–0 | 11–0 | 2002 FIFA World Cup qualification |
| 8 | 7 May 2001 | Al-Hamadaniah Stadium, Aleppo, Syria | Laos | 10–0 | 11–0 | 2002 FIFA World Cup qualification |
| 9 | 18 May 2001 | Al-Hamadaniah Stadium, Allepo, Syria | Oman | 2–2 | 3–3 | 2002 FIFA World Cup qualification |
