= Mansour Al-Mousa =

Saudi Arabian footballer

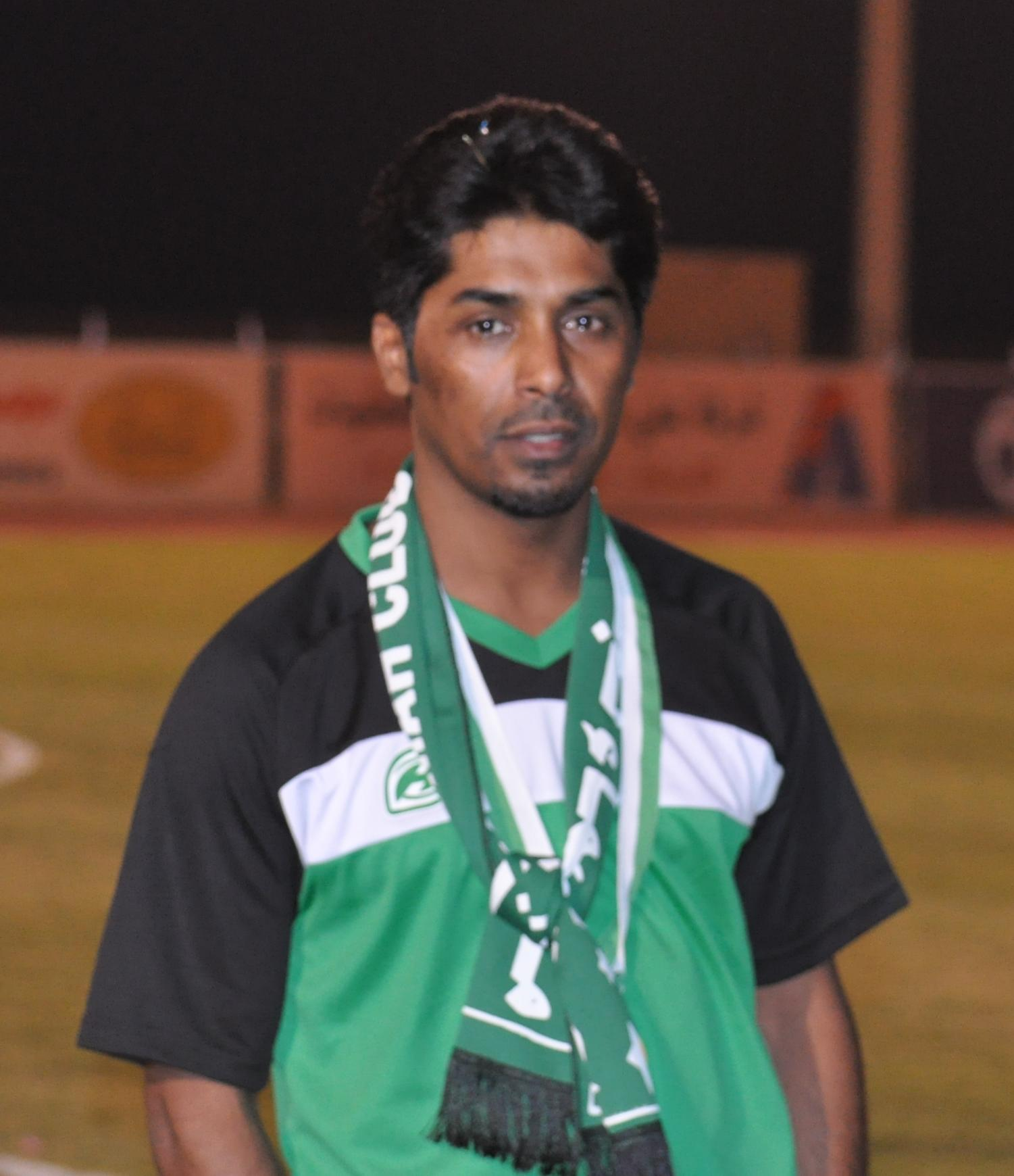

Personal information
- Full name: Mansour Abdulrahman Al-Mousa
- Date of birth: October 29, 1972 (age 54)
- Place of birth: Unaizah, Saudi Arabia
- Height: 1.68 m (5 ft 6 in)
- Position: Midfielder

Team information
- Current team: Al-Najma (Director of Football)

Youth career
- Al-Najma

Senior career*
Years	Team	Apps	(Gls)
1990–1999	Al-Najma		
1999–2002	Al-Nassr		
2002–2002	Al-Najma		

International career
1989	Saudi Arabia U17		
Medal record
Representing Saudi Arabia
Men's football
FIFA U-17 World Cup
Winner	1989 Scotland
- * Club domestic league appearances and goals

Mansour Al-Mousa (Arabic: منصور الموسى) is a Saudi Arabian former professional footballer who played as a striker. He was born on October 29, 1972, in Unaizah, Saudi Arabia. He played for Al-Najma from 1990, and he was one of the winners of the 1989 FIFA U-17 World Championship.

== International goals ==
#	Date	Venue	Opponent	Score	Result	Competition
.	October 28, 1993	Doha, Qatar	Iran	4-3	Won	1994 FIFA World Cup qualification (AFC) Group Stages
