= Derby of Kokkinia =

- Fans of Proodeftiki in a match against Ionikos in 2017
- Native name: Ντέρμπι της Κοκκινιάς
- Other names: Barca-Real of Grigoriou Lampraki
- Sport: Association football
- Location: Piraeus
- Teams: Ionikos; Proodeftiki
- First meeting: Ionikos - Proodeftiki 0-0, 29 December 1968, Beta Ethniki
- Latest meeting: Proodeftiki - Ionikos 2-0, 11 October 2026, Gamma Ethniki
- Stadiums: Neapoli Stadium, Nikaia Municipal Gymnasium

Statistics
- Total meetings: 39 (Official)
- Most wins: Proodeftiki (10)

The Derby of Kokkinia is an association football derby contested between Ionikos from Nikaia and Proodeftiki from Korydallos, the two most known clubs from the wider Nikaia-Korydallos area. It has been characterized as the "Barca-Real" of Grigoriou Lampraki.

== History ==
The derby was initially between Proodeftiki and one of the predecessor teams of Ionikos, Aris Piraeus.

In 1965, Aris and another team from Nikaia, A.E. Nikaia, merged into Ionikos. The first meeting between Ionikos and Proodeftiki took place on 5 September 1965 in a friendly match that resulted in a scoreless tie, which took place in the Neapoli stadium. The first official match took place in the Beta Ethniki championship in the 1968-69 season. The first meeting in the Alpha Ethniki took place in 1997-98.

The supporters of Ionikos often place chickens with the colors of Proodeftiki in the stadium to mock the supporters of Proodeftiki, a practice which the supporters of Proodeftiki have also adopted by placing chickens with the colors of Ionikos in the stadium.
