= Cai Sheng =

Chinese football manager and former player

Cai Sheng 蔡晟
Personal information
- Date of birth: 12 November 1971 (age 54)
- Place of birth: Wuhan, Hubei, China
- Height: 1.94 m (6 ft 4 1/2 in)
- Position: Forward

Youth career
- 1988–1989: Chinese National B Team
- 1990–1992: Chinese Olympic Development Team

Senior career*
Years	Team	Apps	(Gls)
1993–2001	Wuhan Hongjinlong		
2002–2003	Qingdao Hailifeng		

International career
1992–1994	China	11	(4)

Managerial career
- 2007–2008: Wenzhou Tomorrow
- 2009: Qingdao Hailifeng
Medal record
Men's football
Representing China
AFC Asian Cup
Bronze medal – third place	1992 Japan	Team
- * Club domestic league appearances and goals

Cai Sheng (Chinese: 蔡晟; born 12 November 1971) is a Chinese football manager and a former international forward. He represented Wuhan and Qingdao in his club career while internationally he played for China in 1992 Asian Cup.

== Career statistics ==
=== International ===
Year	Competition	Apps	Goal
1992–1994	Friendly	3	0
1992	Dynasty Cup	2	0
1992	Asian Cup	1	0
1993	FIFA World Cup qualification	5	4
Total		11	4

Scores and results list China's goal tally first, score column indicates score after each Cai goal.

List of international goals scored by Cai Sheng
No.	Date	Venue	Opponent	Score	Result	Competition
1	22 May 1993	Al-Hassan Stadium, Irbin, Jordan	Pakistan	2–0	5–0	1994 FIFA World Cup qualification
2	22 May 1993	Al-Hassan Stadium, Irbin, Jordan	Pakistan	3–0	5–0	1994 FIFA World Cup qualification
3	22 May 1993	Al-Hassan Stadium, Irbin, Jordan	Pakistan	5–0	5–0	1994 FIFA World Cup qualification
4	26 May 1993	Al-Hassan Stadium, Irbin, Jordan	Jordan	3–0	3–0	1994 FIFA World Cup qualification

== Honours ==
=== Player ===
==== Club ====
China national football B team

- Chinese Jia-A League: 1989

Wuhan

- Chinese Jia-B League: 1997
