= Jaffar Omran =

Iraqi football striker

Personal information
- Full name: Jaffar Omran Salman
- Date of birth: 1 July 1966 (age 60)
- Place of birth: Iraq
- Position: Forward

Senior career*
Years	Team	Apps	(Gls)
1985–1992	Al-Naft SC		
1992–1998	Al-Quwa Al-Jawiya		

International career
1989–1993	Iraq		
- * Club domestic league appearances and goals

Jaffar Omran Salman (Arabic: خَعْفَر عِمْرَان سَلْمَان; born 1 July 1966) is a former Iraqi football forward who played for Iraq in the 1994 FIFA World Cup qualification. He played for the national team between 1989 and 1993.

In a World Cup qualification match in 1993, Jaffar scored the last minute equalising goal which denied Japan a spot at the 1994 FIFA World Cup.

== Career statistics ==
=== International goals ===
Scores and results list Iraq's goal tally first.

No	Date	Venue	Opponent	Score	Result	Competition
1.	28 October 1993	Al-Ahli Stadium, Doha, Qatar	Japan	2–2	2–2	1994 FIFA World Cup qualification
