= Proodeftiki F.C. =

Greek football club

Proodeftiki
- Full name: Αθλητικός Όμιλος Προοδευτική Νεολαία; Athlitikós Όmilos Proodeftiki Neolea (Athletic Club Progressive Youth)
- Nicknames: Vyssiní (The Crimsons); Vasílissa tou Peiraia (The Queen of Piraeus)
- Short name: PROO
- Founded: 1927; 99 years ago
- Stadium: Nikaia Municipal Stadium
- Capacity: 5,000
- Chairman: Manousos Georgitsakis
- Manager: Vasilis Spathas
- League: Gamma Ethniki
- 2025–26: Piraeus FCA First Division (Group 1), 1st (promoted)
Home colours

Proodeftiki Football Club, also known as Proodeftiki Piraeus, simply as Proodeftiki, or with its full name as A.O. Proodeftiki Neolea (Greek: Αθλητικός Όμιλος Προοδευτική Νεολαία, transliterated "Athlitikós Όmilos Proodeftiki Neolea", Athletic Club Progressive Youth), is a Greek football club, part of the major multi-sport club A.O. Proodeftiki Neolea, based in Korydallos, Piraeus – Attica.

The club has a longstanding presence in Super League, having participated so far 15 times.

== History ==
=== Formation and early years ===
The club exists since 1925. The official year of its foundation is 1927. Founded in Kokkinia, a suburb of Piraeus, which is the older name of Nikaia, a few years later by the "Asia Minor Catastrophe". Kokkinia, the older name of Nikaia, inhabited mainly by Greeks and Armenians refugees who inhabited the coast of Asia Minor. Hellenic Football Federation was founded on 1926. Proodeftiki, one of the older members of Hellenic Football Federation, became its member with Registration Number 31.

The founders of Proodeftiki, Korais, Verzopoulos and Metaxas, laid the foundations for an association that is almost approaching a century of invaluable social and sporting action and offer. It is characteristic that the idea of setting up a sports club was associated with the effort to reconstruct and regenerate the place after the Asia Minor catastrophe. The founders established as the motto of the club's emblem is the mythical long-lived bird, the Phoenix, which is reborn from its ashes in crimson and white, and as the football headquarters was chosen the then Grass Municipal Gym of Nikaia, the historical seat of the association.

=== Pre-war period and first steps ===
"Proodeftiki Youth", also referred to as "Proodeftiki", officially participated in the competitions of the National Technical University of Athens. Piraeus from the period 1928–29, whenever it belongs to Gamma Ethniki. Since October 1926, and even before it was active in official competitions, she was initially joined by the Piraeus Association of Football Associations, also giving friendly matches. In November 1926 the Piraeus Association of Football Associations joins with the Piraeus Football Association, where the team is finally included. Also, in November 1926, the Hellenic Football Federation is founded, where Progressive is registered, being the first of its football clubs, under the Hellenic Football Federation Registration Number 31. In February 1927, with the start of the 1926–27 Championship of the National Technical University of Athens, Piraeus, seems to be included in the official events, but without ending it, and even up to the official championships, and more specifically in the 3rd Division between 1928–29, he continued to give friendly matches as an independent team. In the 3rd category of the National Technical University of Athens Piraeus continued to struggle until the period 1933–34, as the next one seems to have not been established, and then continued into the second category. Thus, from the period 1934-35, in the mid-1930s, he took part in the second category, which was the last hierarchical class for that period. In the period 1935–36 he finished in 1st position of the second category, equalizing with Aris Piraeus (Kokkinias), but in a match between them, to secure the position and at the same time to climb, he was defeated by 1–0 and remained in the second half, category. Over the next two seasons (1936–37 and 1937–38) he continued to claim the rise to the top class of the FCA Piraeus, finishing in 3rd and 2nd place respectively. Eventually, the next one, 1938–39, became the champion and was promoted to the first class of the Piraeus championship for the first time. In her last match for the championship, and while mathematics had already been declared champion, 3-0 won the defense of Red Kokkinia (after Nikaias SA) in a match that took place at the Georgios Karaiskakis Stadium. The home games, both official and non-official, took place in the former Cycling Stadium (afterwards the Georgios Karaiskakis Stadium) in Neo Faliro, which the team used until the 1970s. In 1939, at the border with the Korydallos area, New Kokkinia (since 1940 Nice) was built at the current Nice Municipal Stadium, which has since started to use it from time to time and since the mid-1970s it has become the permanent seat of.

=== First important pre-war distinctions ===
In the 1939–40 season, with the coach of the veteran international player Filippos Kourantis, Proodeftiki finished 3rd in the A' Category, behind Ethnikos Piraeus and Olympiacos, which gave him the right, as a third player Piraeus, to qualify for Panhellenic championship for the first time in its history. Notable were her wins in the Piraeus Championship on Piraeus Thesis with 4–1 and on Argonaut Piraeus 7–2. In the 1939–40 Greek Championship, he finished last in the 8th place of the South Group, behind Athens Stars, while his only victory was the 2–1 win over Athinaikos. At the same time, Proodeftiki managed to overtake the qualifying phase of the Piraeus Cup region of Greece for the first time in its history, dominating the Keramikos Kaminis (champion B) with 4–1 in a repetitive match (the first match ended 0–0) at the Georgios Karaiskakis Stadium with over 2000 spectators. Proodeftiki was then eliminated from AEK (Athens champion and subsequent champion of Greece) with –-1 at Nikos Goumas Stadium.

In the first years of World War II and with the outbreak of the Greek-Italian war, the 1940–41 league was interrupted only in its third game, whereas Proodeftiki was in 2nd place after the 2–2 with Ethnikos Piraeus, winning 6–2 on Argonauts and defeating 1–0 from Keramikos Kaminis respectively. It was followed by the Occupation period, throughout which the official championships were not held, but he took part in the unofficial Athens-Piraeus Championship that was held in 1943–44, during the difficult years of the occupied war, from the forces of the axis, Greece.

=== 1945–1959: Postwar period, major distinctions and successes ===
==== 1945–1955: First post-war years and downward course ====
After the reunification of the official championships, he continued for 8 consecutive years in the top Piraeus championship category (from 1945–46 to 1952–53), but did not manage to qualify for the Panhellenic Championship, finishing not more than the 3rd position occupied in the periods 1945–46 and 1947–48. In the period 1952–53 he finished last in the 6th place of the 1st Division of the EPI Piraeus Championship, which led her to claim her stay, through a barrage fight with the champion of the A2 'class and coopitos, Aris Piraeus. In the first match, they scored 1–1 in the Nikea Stadium, before some 5,000 spectators and in the second and repetitive games they were re-scored, but no goals were scored this time (0–0). Thus, in the third game, Proodeftiki was defeated by 2–1 and temporarily deferred to the A2 'category. In the A2 'category he played temporarily for two seasons (1953–54 and 1954–55) when the latter finished at the top, in front of the Piraeus Glory and won the championship. So, as a champion, she had to claim her return to the first class, through a grading match, with the latter, Panelefsiniakos. In the first match, it won 5–3 away in Elefsina and in the second one they scored with 1–1 home in the Nikaia Stadium and secured her return to the top of the Piraeus championship.

==== 1955–1959: Great course and distinction and rise in the newly established Alpha Ethniki ====
Then, in the second half of the 1950s, the club began its most important career and was established as the third force of Piraeus. Initially, between 1955–56 he finished third, behind Ethnikos Piraeus and Olympiacos and in front of Atromitos Piraeus. In the following two seasons, 1956–57 and 1957–58, he finished second and highest ever in the Piraeus Championship, behind Olympiacos and in front of the National League, winning as a secondary her participation in the respective championships (1956–57 and 1957–58) of the Panhellenic Championship. In the 1956–57 Greek Championship, Proodeftiki finished in the 9th and penultimate positions, ahead of the Panagiersakos beat and behind Panionios and remarkable victories was the prevailing on Panargiakos with 5–1 in and 0–4 away, while Petros Christofidis, one of the team's top players, scored 15 goals and was the top scorer of the championship. In the 1957–58 Greek Championship, it made its best, finishing in 6th place in a total of 12 teams, while the victories over Panathinaikos (1–2 with 1–0 in home) and home wins against PAOK (3–1) and OFI (4–0) respectively, and also the away wins against Panionios and Apollon Kalamarias with 1–2 respectively. In the period 1958–59 however, Proodeftiki finished in 4th place in the Piraeus Championship, behind SA. Nice and ahead of the Panelefsiniakos, Piraeus, Atromitos and Argonauts, thus losing to one place the qualification for the barrage participation in the Pahellenic Championship 1958–59. In the following period, 1959–60, Proodeftiki continued its racing obligations in the Piraeus Championship and in the first 5 games, Aris Piraeus prevailed 4–0, 1–1 with Atromitos Piraeus, 1–0 from Panelefsiniakos, he scored 0–0 with the National and finally he was also equalized, this time 1–1 with Argonaut. However, in October 1959, Proodeftiki was decided to establish the permanent 1st National Division to replace the Pahellenic Championship and, as a Piraeus quadrant of the previous period (1958–59), was entitled to participate.

Proodeftiki participation in the newly-established championship of the permanent Alpha Ethniki, Proodeftiki had to claim through a barrage struggle, where Proodeftiki faced Olympiacos Chalkis, who had in the meantime imposed and displaced OFI. In the first match between them in Chalkida, they scored 2–2, while a draw (0–0) was the result in the repeat at the Georgios Karaiskakis Stadium. In the third most, after two consecutive draws, played in Nea Philadelphia's neutral stadium, Proodeftiki prevailed 3–0, with two goals scored by Petros Christofidis (9', 11') and one by Nikos Mitosis (58') and has secured, before 10,000 spectators, its historical prestige in the first league of the First National Championship.

=== 1959–1971: In Alpha Ethniki, distinctions and relegations in Beta Ethniki ===
Proodeftiki fought in 10 of the first 12 championships of the newly established Alpha Ethniki and more specifically from 1959–60 until 1970–71, with the exception of the 1963–64 and 1968–69 years that he played in Beta Ethniki. In the period 1959–60 he was one of the four piratical teams that formed the 16th overall, the first championship of the First National. At the premiere of the Championship and at the same time in the first game of its history in Alpha Ethniki Championship, Apollon Kalamarias prevailed 1–0 at the Karaiskakis Stadium, with the only goal of Nikos Mitosis (67'), which was the first and the first goal chronologically, which occurred in the history of Alpha Ethniki. At the end of the championship he found Progressive in 9th place, ranking with Iraklis of Thessaloniki, leading to a classification match, to formally secure the score, defeating 2–0 and eventually taking the 10th place, leaving behind them Apollon Kalamaria, National, Panayalioio, Pankorinthos, Megas Alexandros Katerinis and AE Nikaias. The home team suffered a total of just 2 defeats, from Olympiacos (1–2) and Doxa Drama (0–1) respectively, among other things notable were the home win against Panagiiletos (2–0), Pankorinthos (3–1), Aris and Panionios with 2–1 respectively and the away games against Doxa Drama (2–4) and AE Nikaias with 0–4. At the same time, excluding Panaginthiakos (2–2 and 5–0) in the quarter-finals, he qualified for the semifinals of the Greek Cup for the first time in his history, where he met Panathinaikos and after two draws (1–1 and 3–3 respectively) was excluded from the currency twist.

In the following period, 1960–61, after a tie, again with a team from Thessaloniki, participated for the second consecutive time in a classification match to secure a ranking position in Alpha Ethniki. This time with Mars, with which he ranked in 11th place and in the classification match between them, Proodeftiki 2–0 prevailed, formally securing 11th place, behind PAOK and ahead in turn from the 12th, Mars and the Apollon Kalamarias, Panegialios, Thermaikos and Atromitos Piraeus. Among other things, remarkable was the home win against AEK (4–2) and homeless victories on National (0–3) and PAOK (1–3) respectively. In the 1961–62 season he finished in 10th place on the scoreboard, behind Fostas and ahead in a row by Niki Volos, Apollon Kalamarias, Aris, Egaleo, Panelefsiniakos and Doxa Dramas, while the home win was remarkable Niki Volos (4–2) and the victory over Egaleo (1–4) away. In the following period, 1962–63, he finished two places down on the scoreboard, in 12th place, where he equalized with Aris, Apollon Kalamarias and Panegialios, led to ranking games to secure the privileged positions of the stay. In the first match, 3–1 they were defeated by Aris, the second one was scored 1–1 with Apollon and the third was defeated 1–0 by Panegialios and eventually ranked 15th and deferred to Beta Ethniki for the first time.

Then, for the first time in 1963–64, he was second in Beta Ethniki, where he was a champion in the second group with 22 wins, 9 draws and only 1 defeat, while at the same time he succeeded 82 goals and it was only 20. Its only defeat, throughout the championship, was the away defeat in Crete with 3–1 from Herodotus, while on the contrary it crushed almost all other opponents, distinguishing among others the home wins on Atromitos Piraeus (5–1) and Aias Salamina (5–0) instead respectively, on OFI (4–2), RFO (4–0) and Irodotos (3–0) respectively, and on the Olympiacos Loutraki 7–0. The leading person was Giannis Frantzis, who scored 40 of the 82 teams in total and was the top scorer of all four (4) teams. At the same time, she proved her potential in the Greek Cup, where she eliminated in the 16th stage Panionios away from home in Nea Smyrni with 1–2 and qualified in the quarter-finals, from which he was hardly blocked by AEK (0–1) at Georgios Karaiskakis Stadium. She had to win through a special championship, among the champions of the other three clubs (Panachaiki, Philippi of Kavala and Trikala, respectively), from which the first two were promoted to the 1st National. Initially, he was home to AOT, where he scored 1–1 in the Nikaia Stadium before 6,000 spectators and then defeated Philippos Kavalas, AOT and Panachaiki, with 2–4 at home in Kavala, defeated 2–1 in Trikala and was 1–1 in a draw in Patras. He then faced Filipe Kavalas at home in Karaiskakis Stadium, where he was 2–1 in the last and most crucial match, while Proposedetika was in the second privileged position with 11 points, at home in Georgios Karaiskakis Stadium in Panachaiki, who was in 3rd place, with a difference of one point and with 3–0, with two goals from Frantzis (34', 48' pence) and one from Panagiotis Skoufou (66'), secured 2nd place and its return in Alpha Ethniki, before 22,000 spectators who had attended to par monitoring the decisive match. In the 1964–65 season, having just returned to Alpha Ethniki, he made his most successful presence so far with a total of 11 wins, 12 draws and 7 defeats in the 4th place, behind Olympiacos, AEK and Panathinaikos (teams of the so-called POK), which is the highest position to date in the championship. It remained unbeaten by the PAOK teams of Thessaloniki (whose home away from Toumba was home to 1–0) and Mars (with 1–1 away from home and away) and Olympiacos 0–3 and 1–1 draws), while in the league, only 2 times, AEK and Panionios were defeated by 0–2, respectively. Meanwhile, during the same period, excluding Panagialeios (3–0) and the quarter-finals of Egaleo (3–2) respectively, he reached the semi-finals of the Greek Cup for the second time in his history, new from Panathinaikos with difficulty, after defeating 0–1 in Karaiskakis Stadium. In the following three years, he played a race course without any stability. Initially, in the 1965–66 period, he finished in 13th place, tied with Panserraikos and Panayalioyos, with whom he was led to ranking matches for the stay. In the first match he was defeated by 0–1 from Panayalio in New Philadelphia and in the second match was imposed with 2–1 of Panserraikos in the Trikala Stadium with the goals of Panagiotis Skoufos and Giorgos Grypaiou. However, after equalizing and in the league matches, the goal scorer of the regular season of the championship, where Progressive had a great lead, having achieved a total of 42 goals, while Panserraikos and Panayihelos from 29 and 27 respectively secured the stay in Alpha Ethniki. At the same time, excluding Atromitos Piraeus (2–4) from the 16th round, he reached the quarter-finals of the Greek Cup where he was eliminated from Kavala away from home. In the following period, 1966–67, he finished in 8th place in the scoreboard, in front of Hercules and behind the National Piraeus, being the second highest ranked (after 4th place) in the first league, 1967–68, finished in 16th place in a total of 18 teams and departed in Second National for a second time in its history, after 4 consecutive years and 8 in total, in the top class. In the meantime, with the advent of the 1967 dictatorship in the country's political leadership and throughout its seven-year period until 1974, Proodeftiki, because it was composed of human progressive beliefs, something that was not liked by members of the dictatorial regime, it became a target and there was a great deal of controversy between them and specific players and managers of Proodeftiki. More specifically, members of the regime "forced" in 1967 to leave one of the most important football players of the group, Charalampos Vergidis. Also, upon request of the regime, the Federation of Supporters closed. Defeated in the 2nd National for the second time in its history, 1968–69 finished in the second privileged position of the South Group, 54 behind Panachai and in front of Fosta, with 19 wins, 9 draws and 6 defeats. Inside it suffered just 1 defeat from Ethnikos Asteras 0–2, while on the contrary it remained unbeaten by the champion Panachaiki, with which they managed to score 1–1 home and home away from Proodeftiki with 1–2. As a secondary student, she claimed her return to the top category, through a special match with the 14th grade of the 1st National Championship, Apollo Athinon. In the first decisive match at the G. Karaiskakis stadium, it prevailed with 1–0, with the same result defeated in the second match at the Georgios Kamaras Stadium and the teams then the tie between them, with a result of 1–1, were led in third match to the neutral the stadium of Avenue , where again 1–1 draws. Finally, then the tie between them, with a total score of 2–2, was the solution given in the paradoxical way of turning the coin, which used to be in those years, finding Proodeftiki lucky, where Proodeftiki won her return to the top class. In the period 1969–70, the Portuguese manager Severiano Correia took over the club, under the guidance of which the team performed relatively well. With 9 wins, 13 draws and 12 defeats, Proodeftiki finished 12th in front of OFI. Of the total of 12 defeats, home defeated only 2 times, AEK and Panathinaikos with 0–2, respectively. Characteristic of the season was mainly the home win against Cyprus champion of the previous year, Olympiakos Nicosia with 9–0, as it was the biggest victory in the history of the National League at that time and at the same time the biggest home Proodeftiki victory in the top class to date. In the following period, 1970–71, Proodeftiki did not appear to be competitive at all, with just 5 wins, 14 draws and 15 defeats in 16th place in a total of 18 teams, ahead of OFI and EPA Larnaca and redeployed to B National. Inside it suffered 5 defeats, while from 5 of its total victories in the league, the 3 were home, where Aris (2–1), Pierikos (1–0) and EPA Larnaca (2–0) respectively prevailed, while outside home of Olympiacos and Fostiras with 1–2 respectively.

=== 1971–1997: Between Beta and Gamma Ethniki and a return to Alpha Ethniki, after 26 years ===
==== 1971–1987: 15 consecutive years in Beta Ethniki and first relegation in Gamma Ethniki ====
After relegation from the big category, which already had 10 total stakes, Proodeftiki continued 15 consecutive races (from 1971–72 to 1986–87) in Beta Ethniki. During their first years at Beta Ethniki in the early 1970s, she had very good presences, approaching the return to Alpha Ethniki. More specifically, in 1971–72, Proodeftiki finished in 2nd place, with only 1 degree difference from the Atromitos champion in Athens, in 1973–74 in the 3rd place behind the champion Atromitos of Athens and the second place Kalamata, next 1974–75, 2nd place behind the champion Apollon Athens, a position which after reorganization of the class no longer allowed her to go as a secondary school student, while in the period 1976–77 he claimed again the return, which was finally wrongly denied, due to a 4-point deduction, accused of freezing expectation in A.P.S. Patras. He continued in Beta Ethniki and although most of the time it consisted of very good players, he failed to win the rally, ending not more than the 4th place, which he occupied in the 1978–79 and 1980–81 seasons, while the 1986–87, after removing the 1st Grade, which essentially deprived her stay, finished in 15th place (first place in the relegation zone) and was demoted to the 3rd National for the first time in the club's history. At the same time, their best course in the Greek Cup during their 15-year presence in the 2nd National Division was during the period 1982-83, when Athens, Rodos and Doxas Drama (National Team A group) until the quarter-finals, and was blocked from Rodos (Group A National).

==== 1987–1992: First years in Gamma Ethniki ====
In Gamma Ethniki, originally played three consecutive seasons (1987–88, 1988–89 and 1989–90), when the last won the championship and promoted to Beta Ethniki, but on which the next, 1990–91 demoted new in Gamma Ethniki. 1991–92, under the technical leadership of Giannis Kyrastas finished in 2nd place in the standings of the South Group, tying with Ilisiakos, which consequently led to a classification match to ensure the second privileged position giving the right to rise. In this race, held at the neutral Olympic Stadium, emerged tied 0–0 in regular time and extra time and led to a penalty shootout, where main protagonist of Giannis Papamichail goalkeeper who parried two penalties and targeted killings of Thanasis Sfetsas, Simou Karagiannidis, Ball and Taki Mandrafli prevailed 4–2 and secured the second privileged location and coveted return the Second Division as defterathlitria before about 6,000 fans of which followed in this critical match.

==== 1992–1997: In Beta Ethniki, the creation of professional club and the return to Alpha Ethniki, after 26 whole years ====
With Proodeftiki's return to Beta Ethniki and while Greek football had been introduced to professionalism since 1979, Proodeftiki acquired a professional form and was later transformed into a Soccer Societe Anonyme, under the name "PAE Proodeftiki". In Beta Ethniki, Proodeftiki competed for the next 5 consecutive years (from 1992–93 to 1996–97), when the latter finished in second place and secured her return to the top class. In the last game, 0–2 away with goals scored by Isaak Almanidis (3rd pen.) and Nikos Fouskas (73') of the indifferent Grass Dragos of Drama and mathematically secured the second privileged position claimed by Panetolikos, which led to Alpha Ethniki, after 26 years of absence, before her 1,000 fans who traveled to Drama to watch the decisive race for the much-awaited rally.

=== 1997–2004: Between Alpha and Beta Ethniki ===
==== 1997–2000: In Alpha Ethniki ====
In Alpha Ethniki, after 26 consecutive years of absence, and for the first time the professionalization of the category in 1979, Proodeftiki played for three consecutive years. Initially, in the 1997–98 season, the first year of the club in the 1st National as a professional, finished in 14th place, ahead of Ethnikos Piraeus and just two points, over the relegation zone. At the championship premiere, 3–0 was home to Athenian, which was also the first "professional" victory of the club as the FCA in Alpha Ethniki, followed by other remarkable victories, with a more distinctive, home winning at the then strong AEK with 3–2 and also home winning 1–0 at the derby with Ionic in the first showdown of the two clubs in the top division. In the following season, 1998–99, he finished two places on top of 12, and again he had great victories like PAOK and Aris with 2–1 respectively and the away games against both National and Hercules with 0–2 and 0–1. In the 1999–2000 season, with just 7 wins and draws and 20 defeats, finished in 16th place and temporarily deferred, after three consecutive years in the top division, but from just 7 wins, they stood 1–0 Panathinaikos and PAOK at home respectively.

==== 2000–2004: Between Alpha and Beta Ethniki and relegation ====
In Beta Ethniki, Proodeftiki fought for two years (2000–01 and 2001–02), when she finished in the 3rd privileged position and as a third player returned immediately after 2 years of absence to A Ethniki, where she also fought for two years. Initially, in the 2002–03 season he finished in 11th place, making a remarkable presence and achieving great victories, such as away from Panathinaikos and Ionikos with 0–1 respectively, and home games against Akratitos, Aris and Iraklis with 5–1, 3–1 and 1–0 respectively. In the 2003–04 season, with only 4 wins (all home), 8 draws and 18 defeats, he finished in the 16th and final position, behind Paniliakos and Akratitos, thus knowing the relegation to the second class. More special, out of 4 in total, was the win for the 3rd game, Olympiacos with 1–0 and the other 3, Panelioukos and OFI prevailed with 2–0 respectively and Iraklis with 3–2. On the contrary, despite the team's poor performance in the championship, the Greek Cup of the same period (2003–04) made a decent course, in which Kassandra and Akratite reached out to the quarter-finals, with difficulty (4–3 in the penalty shootout) from Kastoria.

=== 2004–present: Economic problems and low categories ===
==== 2004–2007: Beta Ethniki, debts of the club, economic impasse and first demotion in Delta Ethniki ====
Then downgrading to the 2nd National and the financial problems he was facing began a downward period for the history of Progressive. In the Second National, he played three consecutive bouts (2004–05, 2005–06 and 2006–07) when he finished in 16th place and deferred. The financial problems and debts of the FCE, which had in the meantime arisen, led initially to Yannis Karras's chairman in thoughts about a merger with Hermes Korydallos, something that never happened after the strong reaction and denial of the veteran footballers and fans of the club. Finally, he decided not to take part in the Third National Championship, since he was unable, but to be downgraded directly to the lowest and first amateur category, Delta Ethniki, for the first time in the club's history, to bankrupt as a club and consequently to get rid of its debts, as provided by the Sporting Law, resulting in intense controversy, with many protests and complaints from the side of organized supporters to the President of the Club and for 21 consecutive years financier of Progressive, Ioannis Karras, who became responsible for this team's progress, and eventually resigned, in the middle of summer 2007. With the demotion to D Ethniki and the dissolution of the FC, he turned into an amateur form, as "Α.Ο. Proodeftiki Youth ", relying on the amateur club.

==== 2007–2011: Delta Ethniki ====
In the 4th National, an unprecedented category for Proodeftiki, where they were first found due to financial problems, he played four consecutive bouts. In the first three periods and first in history in Delta Ethniki (2007–08, 2008–09 and 2009–10), it failed to conquer the rise in professional categories. At the same time, the failure for a win during this three-year period was accompanied by the amateur competition of the Piraeus Cup, where it also participated for the first time, as its best course in the tournament was until the semi-finals of 2009–10, where it was difficulty in the penalty shootout - from the adjacent APO Keratsini (also the 4th National Team). On the contrary, during the 2010–11 season its racing course was quite successful, as with enough ease and just 6 games before the end of the championship it became a mathematical champion in the 9th group of the 4th National Championship, whenever it prevailed with 2–0 in the home of Triglia Rafina and also won the Piraeus Cup for the first time in its history, ensuring as a Damblouhos amateur the return to the professional categories and more specifically in the 3rd National.

==== 2011–2014: Gamma Ethniki, economic problems and downgrading ====
With its rise to Gamma Ethniki and the financial problems, however, continue to oscillate the club, it gained a semi-professional form after being unable to turn into a professional (PAE) and subsequently turned into a Paying Players' Division (T.P.), under the name "TAP". Α.Ο. Proodeftiki Youth". In the 2011–12 season, Proodeftiki finished 9th in the first group, which forced her to take part in a barrage struggle that took place in the neutral stadium of Trikala and prevailed 1–0 of Alexandros Hercules Grand, ensuring her stay. At the same time, in the Greek Cup, they retired the Renaissance Giannitson (2nd National Team) in the 2nd round and then was eliminated by the upper Asteras Tripolis (Super League team).

In the 2012–13 season he was in seventh position in the first group with 36 points, a position that gave him the right to be promoted to Football League. However, due to the punishment imposed on her, she was stripped of 2 points, leading her to tie in seventh place with Paniliakos and A.O. Glyfada, who excelled and eventually Proodeftiki was ranked 9th, failing to promote. At the same time, in the Greek Cup, he excluded Heracles of Thessaloniki (Group B Ethnikis) in the first round and then in the 32 phase he was eliminated with 2 defeats (4–0 and 1–2) from Panathinaikos.

==== Downgrading to FCA Piraeus ====
In the next period 2013–14 after a restructuring of Greek football, Gamma Ethniki merges with the 4th National and acquires an amateur form, while the second one ceases to exist. Subsequently, the group continues as an amateur, under the name "A.O. Proodeftiki Youth". However, with economic weaknesses remaining and rising, hurting the club and thus the football division, the team, unlike the previous year, is not at all competitive, with a total of 15 teams finishing in the 12th place of the 5th and deferred. But as Delta Ethniki no longer exists, it was deferred directly to the local Piraeus league for the first time in the history of the group, then the introduction of the national categories where it participated. At the same time, during the same period he participated in the first time of the Gamma Ethniki Cup, where he was eliminated away from Panelefsiniakos (3–2), just in the first match of the 5th group.

==== 2014–2016: In FCA Piraeus Championship and return to the National Divisions ====
Following the demotion from Gamma Division, the team fought for the next two years in the championship of the 1st FCA of Piraeus. In July 2014, after the vote, the football club's president was taken over by the veteran footballer Dimitris Hortsas and in November of the same year, the businessman Vassilis Katsaros took over his chair with his close associate and also the main financier Nikos Leisure, aiming at immediate return. However, in the period 2014–15 they finished 2nd in the 1st group of the 1st FCA Piraeus, behind the APO Keratsini, eventually failing to conquer their return to Gamma Ethniki. At the same time, they won the Piraeus Cup, for the second time in its history, winning 0–2 of SA Moschato in the final cup of Piraeus, at the Georgios Karaiskakis Stadium. On the contrary, during the period 2015–16, Katsaros presidency, she was the champion of the 2 nd group of Piraeus Football Clubs Association, winning the unbeaten championship for the first time in its history with a total of 27 wins and 3 draws and 118 goals in favor and 6 against, securing mathematics to win the championship since the last game, which was won by the club's off-home team. Nikaia with 0–10. As a champion of the second group of 1st FCA of Piraeus, she won her participation in the Championship Championship, where she participated in the 9th group together with the same champion of AIPP Piraeus (1st group) Aetos Korydallos, from which she was excluded in the quarter-finals stage of the Piraeus Cup and the respective champions of Athens, Egaleo and Agios Ierotheos. They continued to be unbeaten in this challenge, where she won her third place in the Third National Division, finishing in the 9th place with 4 victories and 2 draws, with a special victory, winning 4–1 at Egaleo, headquarters, at the premiere of the event.

== Crest and colours ==
=== Crest ===
The emblem of the football club of Proodeftiki is the "Phoenix". It has similarities to that of the founding association, and over the years it has been printed in many variations.

=== Colours ===
The colours of the football club are the same as the founding association, the crimson and the white. However, they have been used, mainly in away kits and other colours such as gray and black.

== Stadium ==
Proodeftiki plays its home matches at Nikaia Municipal Gymnasium, located in Nikaia, a suburb of Piraeus. The stadium was complete in 1937 and its latest refresh done in 2000. It currently has a seating capacity of 5,500.

== Honours ==
=== Titles ===
==== National ====
- Second Division
  - Winners: (1) 1963–64
- Third Division
  - Winners: (1) 2021–22 (6th Group)
- Fourth Division
  - Winners: (1) 2010–11 (9th Group)

==== Regional ====
- Piraeus FCA First Division
  - Winners: (3) 2015–16, 2019–20, 2025–26
- Piraeus FCA Cup
  - Winners: (2) 2010–11, 2014–15
- Piraeus FCA Second Division
  - Winners: (1) 1938–39

=== Achievements ===
- Best club's position: 4th in Super League 1964 – 1965
- Greek Cup semi-finals: 2 - 1959 – 1960, 1964–1965
- Greek Cup quarter-finals: 3 - 1963 – 1964, 1982–1983, 2003–2004
- Super League appearances: 15 - 1959–1960, 1960–1961, 1961–1962, 1962–1963, 1964–1965, 1965–1966, 1966–1967, 1967–1968, 1969–1970, 1970–1971, 1997–1998, 1998–1999, 1999–2000, 2002–2003, 2003–2004.

== The Derby of Kokkinia ==
The football matches between Proodeftiki F.C. and Ionikos F.C. are called "The Derby of Kokkinia" or "The Derby of Nikaia".

== Notable players ==
The following Proodeftiki players have been capped at senior international level, with their respective countries. Years in brackets indicate their spells at the club.

=== Greece ===
- (Greece) Lakis Glezos
- (Greece) Christos Xanthopoulos
- (Greece) Panagiotis Ikonomopoulos
- (Greece) Dionysis Chiotis
- (Greece) Dimitrios Eleftheropoulos
- (Greece) Konstantinos Frantzeskos
- (Greece) Sotirios Leontiou
- (Greece) Christos Patsatzoglou
- (Greece) Evaggelos Moras
- (Greece) Anastasios Pantos
- (Greece) Paraskevas Andralas

=== Albania ===
- (Albania) Foto Strakosha
- (Albania) Roland Zajmi

=== Syria ===
- (Syria) Mohammad Nasser Afash
- (Syria) Said Bayazid
- (Syria) Ahmed Kurdughli
- (Syria) Khaled Al Zaher

=== Other countries ===
- (Liberia) Oliver Makor
- (Ukraine) Oleh Protasov
- (Uzbekistan) Stepan Atayan
