= Javad Manafi =

Iranian footballer

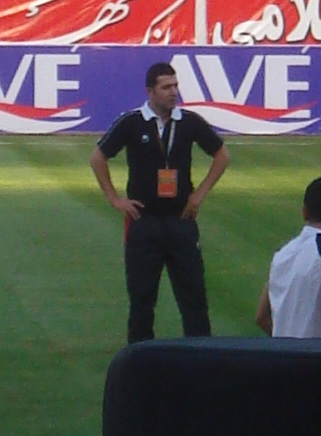

Personal information
- Full name: Seyyed Javad Manafi
- Date of birth: 23 September 1970 (age 56)
- Place of birth: Behshahr, Iran
- Position: Left back

Youth career
- Esteghlal Behshahr
- Mazandaran XI

Senior career*
Years	Team	Apps	(Gls)
1990–1991	Poora		
1991–1992	Fath Tehran		
1992–1994	Persepolis		

International career
1990–1991	Iran U23		
1993–1994	Iran	8	(2)

Managerial career
- 1999–2002: Persepolis U23 (assistant)
- 2002–2003: Persepolis U20
- 2003–2004: Sorkhpooshan (assistant)
- 2006–2007: Saipa U23
- 2007–2008: Saipa (analyzor)
- 2009–2010: Islamic Azad University of Zanjan
- 2010–2011: Nassaji (assistant)
- 2011–2013: Rah Ahan (analyzor)
- 2013–2014: Persepolis (analyzor)
- 2017–2018: Tractor Sazi (assistant)
- * Club domestic league appearances and goals

Javad Manafi (Persian: جواد منافی; born September 23, 1970) is an Iranian retired association footballer and coach. He has represented Iran national football team 8 times, scoring twice.

In 1994, he was badly injured in a car crash, forcing him to retire at age 24.
