= Munthir Khalaf =

Iraqi footballer

Personal information
- Full name: Munthir Khalaf Muhsin
- Date of birth: 1 July 1970
- Place of birth: Iraq
- Date of death: 14 March 2008 (aged 37)
- Place of death: Baghdad, Iraq
- Position: Midfielder

International career
Years	Team	Apps	(Gls)
1992–1993	Iraq		(2)

Munthir Khalaf Muhsin (Arabic: مُنْذِر خَلَف مُحْسِن; 1 July 1970 – 14 March 2008) was an Iraqi football midfielder who played for Iraq at the 1994 World Cup qualification. He played for the national team between 1992 and 1993.

Khalaf was assassinated in front of his home at the Yarmouk area in Baghdad on 14 March 2008.

== Career statistics ==
=== International goals ===
Scores and results list Iraq's goal tally first.

No	Date	Venue	Opponent	Score	Result	Competition
1.	24 May 1993	Al-Hassan Stadium, Irbid	Jordan	1–1	1–1	1994 FIFA World Cup qualification
2.	28 May 1993	Al-Hassan Stadium, Irbid	Pakistan	7–0	8–0	1994 FIFA World Cup qualification
