= 2005–06 AEK Athens F.C. season =

AEK Athens
2005–06 season
- Chairman: Demis Nikolaidis
- Manager: Fernando Santos
- Stadium: Athens Olympic Stadium
- Alpha Ethniki: 2nd
- Greek Cup: Runners-up
- UEFA Cup: First round
- Top goalscorer: League: Nikos Liberopoulos (14); All: Nikos Liberopoulos (16)
- Highest home attendance: 34,842 vs Olympiacos (2 October 2005)
- Lowest home attendance: 4,102 vs Agrotikos Asteras (22 February 2006)
- Average home league attendance: 16,166
- Biggest win: Kallithea 1–4 AEK Athens; PAS Giannina 0–3 AEK Athens; AEK Athens 3–0 Panathinaikos; AEK Athens 3–0 Agrotikos Asteras
- Biggest defeat: Iraklis 4–0 AEK Athens
Home colours	Away colours	Third colours

The 2005–06 season was the 82nd season in the existence of AEK Athens F.C. and the 47th consecutive season in the top flight of Greek football. They competed in the Alpha Ethniki, the Greek Cup and the UEFA Cup. The season began on 29 August 2005 and finished on 14 May 2006.

== Kits ==
Supplier: Adidas
Sponsor(s): TIM
Features: Diners Club, Galaxias Asfalistiki

Home	Away	Third

== Overview ==
Second season in a row for the administration of Demis Nikolaidis and for Fernando Santos on the team's bench. The plan was the same as that of the previous season, the tight budget and step by step for the team to finish as high as possible. However, in relation to the previous year, the enthusiasm and above all the same-mindedness was lacking. A huge role for the lack of unity was played by the events of the first match, in the away match against Atromitos, where, after incidents, Nikolaidis turned against with some of the ultras of AEK and since then nothing has interfered in the same way in the relations between Demis and a portion of the fans. In the summer transfer window, AEK made some useful additions, mainly those of the two Italians, Bruno Cirillo and Stefano Sorrentino, but also of the Ukrainian Oleh Venhlinskyi.

The team, with Nikos Liberopoulos and Kostas Katsouranis as their main players, even though they went for the championship, but it did not seem at any stage of the season to be able to displace Olympiacos from the top. In the end, he finished in 2nd place in a tie with Panathinaikos, 3 points behind the red and whites, but he took the ticket for the Champions League qualifiers of the next season. Also, there began to be a questioning of a part of the world and also of the management towards Fernando Santos, not so much for the efficiency, but for the defensive way the team was playing.

Just one year after the first meeting between the two teams, fortune again brought Zenit Saint Petersburg to the road of AEK in the UEFA Cup. This time, AEK were much more careful in defense and managed to leave St. Petersburg's Petrovsky Stadium with a goalless draw that gave them plenty of chances to qualify. The rematch of Olympic Stadium was expected to be difficult from the start and AEK again approached the game in the same way they faced Zenit in Russia. In the second half, AEK tried to take a little more risk by raising the lines, they had some good phases, but very soon the pace dropped again and while the game was heading to extra time, Andrey Arshavin, in the 89th minute, raced from the left, converged to the center and unleashed a powerful right-footed shot into Sorrentino's corner that touched of the ball but failed to clear the goal. The final result was 0–1 and AEK were left out of European competitions.

In the Greek Cup, AEK initially eliminated PAS Giannina with 0–3 in a single match. He then eliminated Ethnikos Piraeus in the penalty shoot-out and in the quarter-finals he eliminated Niki Volos. In the semi-finals, they played against Agrotikos Asteras, where they eliminated easily and thus advanced to the final against Olympiacos. On May 10 at the Pankritio Stadium, after a poor performance, AEK were defeated with their "hands down" by 3–0 and lost the title.

== Management team ==
Position	Staff
Manager	(Portugal) Fernando Santos
Assistant manager	(Portugal) João Aroso
Assistant manager	(Portugal) Jorge Rosário
Assistant manager	(Portugal) Ricardo Santos
Assistant manager	(Greece) Antonis Minou
Goalkeeping coach	(Serbia and Montenegro) Slobodan Šujica
Director of Football	(Serbia and Montenegro) Ilija Ivić
Technical director	(Netherlands) Eugène Gerards
Academy director	(North Macedonia) Toni Savevski
Academy manager	(Albania) Bledar Kola
Scout	(Netherlands) Eugène Gerards
Scout	(Greece) Dimitris Markos
Head of Medical	(Greece) Lakis Nikolaou

== Players ==
=== Squad information ===
NOTE: The players are the ones that have been announced by the AEK Athens' press release. No edits should be made unless a player arrival or exit is announced. Updated 14 May 2006, 23:59 UTC+3.

No.	Player	Nat.	Position(s)	Date of birth (Age)	Signed	Previous club	Transfer fee	Contract until
Goalkeepers
1	Stefano Sorrentino	(Italy)	GK	28 March 1979 (aged 27)	2005	(Italy) Torino	Free	2010
12	Giannis Arabatzis	(Greece)	GK	28 May 1984 (aged 22)	2002	(Greece) Enosi Apostolou Pavlou	€22,000	2007
22	Dionysis Chiotis (Vice-captain 3)	(Greece)	GK	4 June 1977 (aged 29)	1995	(Greece) AEK Athens U20	—	2007
Defenders
3	Nikola Malbaša	(Serbia and Montenegro)	LB / LM	12 September 1977 (aged 28)	2004	(Russia) Terek Grozny	Free	2007
5	Bruno Cirillo	(Italy)	CB / RB	21 March 1977 (aged 29)	2005	(Italy) Lecce	Free	2008
6	Georgios Alexopoulos	(Greece)	CB / RB	7 February 1977 (aged 29)	2005	(Greece) Egaleo	Free	2008
14	Stavros Tziortziopoulos	(Greece)	LB / CB / LM	15 August 1978 (aged 27)	2004	(Greece) Panionios	Free	2007
18	Vangelis Moras	(Greece)	CB / DM / RB	26 August 1981 (aged 24)	2003	(Greece) Proodeftiki	€260,000	2007
19	Dimitrios Koutromanos	(Greece)	RB / LB / DM	25 February 1987 (aged 19)	2005	(Greece) Panetolikos	€50,000	2010
24	Christos Kontis	(Greece)	RB / CB / LB	13 May 1975 (aged 31)	2004	(Greece) Panionios	Free	2007
31	Nikolaos Georgeas	(Greece)	RB / LB / DM	27 December 1976 (aged 29)	2001	(Greece) Kalamata	€1,500,000	2008
55	Traianos Dellas (Vice-captain)	(Greece)	CB	31 January 1976 (aged 30)	2005	(Italy) Roma	Free	2007
Midfielders
8	Miltiadis Sapanis	(Greece)	CM / LM / AM	28 January 1976 (aged 30)	2005	(Greece) Panathinaikos	Free	2008
10	Panagiotis Kone	(Greece) (Albania)	AM / RM / LM / RW / LW / CM	26 July 1987 (aged 18)	2005	(France) Lens U19	Free	2010
17	Vladan Ivić	(Serbia and Montenegro)	AM / CM / RM / LM	7 May 1977 (aged 29)	2004	(Germany) Borussia Mönchengladbach	Free	2007
20	Vasilios Pliatsikas	(Greece)	DM / CM / RB / CB	20 April 1988 (aged 18)	2005	(Greece) Chaidari	Free	2010
21	Kostas Katsouranis (Captain)	(Greece)	CM / DM / RM / LM / AM / CB / RB / LB	21 June 1979 (aged 27)	2002	(Greece) Panachaiki	Free	2007
23	Vasilios Lakis	(Greece)	RM / RW / AM / CM / RB	10 September 1976 (aged 29)	2005	(England) Crystal Palace	Free	2008
25	Emerson	(Brazil)	DM / CM	12 April 1972 (aged 34)	2006	(Greece) Skoda Xanthi	€150,000	2007
26	Ilias Kyriakidis	(Greece)	DM / CM / AM	5 August 1985 (aged 20)	2004	(Greece) Ionikos	€200,000	2009
27	Louay Chanko	(Sweden) (Syria)	DM / CM / AM / RM	29 November 1979 (aged 26)	2005	(Sweden) Malmö	€250,000	2008
28	Christos Bourbos	(Greece)	RM / RB / LM / LB / RW / DM	1 June 1983 (aged 23)	2004	(Greece) PAS Giannina	Free	2008
—	Panagiotis Zorbas	(Greece)	AM / RW / LM / LW / CM	21 April 1987 (aged 19)	2005	(Germany) Bayer 04 Leverkusen U19	Free	2011
Forwards
7	Alessandro Soares	(Brazil)	RW / SS / ST / LW	5 February 1973 (aged 33)	2005	(Greece) OFI	€150,000	2006
9	Angelos Komvolidis	(Greece) (Germany)	LW / ST	14 March 1988 (aged 18)	2005	(Germany) VfB Stuttgart U19	€50,000	2010
11	Oleh Venhlinskyi	(Ukraine)	ST / SS / RW	21 March 1978 (aged 28)	2005	(Ukraine) Dnipro	€850,000	2007
33	Nikos Liberopoulos (Vice-captain 2)	(Greece)	SS / ST / AM	4 August 1975 (aged 30)	2003	(Greece) Panathinaikos	Free	2007
35	Pantelis Kapetanos	(Greece)	ST / RW	8 June 1983 (aged 23)	2006	(Greece) Iraklis	€400,000	2011
99	Júlio César	(Brazil)	LW / SS / AM / RW / ST	26 February 1980 (aged 26)	2005	(Portugal) Gil Vicente	€540,000	2009
Left during Winter Transfer Window
15	Sokratis Papastathopoulos	(Greece)	CB / RB / LB / DM	9 June 1988 (aged 18)	2005	(Greece) Apollon Petalidiou	Free	2008
30	Simos Krassas	(Cyprus) (Greece)	RW / LW / RM / LM	10 June 1982 (aged 24)	2004	(Cyprus) AEL Limassol	€120,000	2008

== Transfers ==
=== In ===
==== Summer ====
No.	Pos.	Player	From	Fee	Date	Contract Until	Source
1	GK	(Italy) Stefano Sorrentino	(Italy) Torino	Free transfer	7 July 2005	30 June 2008	
5	DF	(Italy) Bruno Cirillo	(Italy) Lecce	Free transfer	13 July 2005	30 June 2008	
6	DF	(Greece) Georgios Alexopoulos	(Greece) Egaleo	Free transfer	1 July 2005	30 June 2008	
7	FW	(Brazil) Alessandro Soares	(Greece) OFI	€150,000	6 June 2005	30 June 2006	
8	MF	(Greece) Miltiadis Sapanis	(Greece) Panathinaikos	Free transfer	1 June 2005	30 June 2008	
9	FW	(Greece) Angelos Komvolidis	(Germany) VfB Stuttgart U19	€50,000	26 May 2005	30 June 2010	
10	MF	(Greece) Panagiotis Kone	(France) Lens U19	Free transfer	29 July 2005	30 June 2010	
11	FW	(Ukraine) Oleh Venhlinskyi	(Ukraine) Dnipro	€850,000	21 June 2005	30 June 2007	
15	DF	(Greece) Sokratis Papastathopoulos	(Greece) Apollon Petalidiou	Free transfer	21 June 2005	30 June 2008	
19	DF	(Greece) Dimitrios Koutromanos	(Greece) Panetolikos	€50,000	3 June 2005	30 June 2010	
20	MF	(Greece) Vasilios Pliatsikas	(Greece) Chaidari	Free transfer	1 June 2005	30 June 2008	
23	MF	(Greece) Vasilios Lakis	(England) Crystal Palace	Free transfer	1 July 2005	30 June 2008	
27	MF	(Sweden) Louay Chanko	(Sweden) Malmö	€250,000	3 August 2005	30 June 2008	
55	DF	(Greece) Traianos Dellas	(Italy) Roma	Free transfer	19 September 2005	30 June 2007	
—	MF	(Greece) Nikos Pourtoulidis	(Greece) Thrasyvoulos	Loan return	1 July 2005	30 June 2006	
—	MF	(Greece) Dimitris Karameris	(Greece) Levadiakos	Loan return	1 July 2005	30 June 2009	
—	MF	(Greece) Panagiotis Zorbas	(Germany) Bayer 04 Leverkusen U19	Free transfer	1 July 2005	30 June 2011	

==== Winter ====
No.	Pos.	Player	From	Fee	Date	Contract Until	Source
25	MF	(Brazil) Emerson	(Greece) Skoda Xanthi	€150,000	23 January 2006	30 June 2007	
35	FW	(Greece) Pantelis Kapetanos	(Greece) Iraklis	€400,000	19 January 2006	30 June 2011	
—	FW	(Greece) Leonidas Kampantais	(Cyprus) Anorthosis Famagusta	Loan return	1 January 2006	30 June 2007	

=== Out ===
==== Summer ====
No.	Pos.	Player	To	Fee	Date	Source
1	GK	(Greece) Chrysostomos Michailidis	(Greece) Atromitos	End of contract	1 July 2005	
4	DF	(Portugal) Bruno Alves	(Portugal) Porto	Loan return	30 June 2005	
5	DF	(Greece) Nikos Kostenoglou	Retired		1 July 2005	
7	FW	(Brazil) Alessandro Soares	(Greece) OFI	Loan return	1 July 2005	
8	MF	(Bulgaria) Ivan Rusev	(Greece) Levadiakos	End of contract	1 July 2005	
9	MF	(Bulgaria) Milen Petkov	(Greece) Atromitos	End of contract	1 July 2005	
10	FW	(Greece) Sotiris Konstantinidis	(Greece) Ionikos	End of contract	8 July 2005	
15	DF	(Greece) Dimitris Koutsikos	(Greece) Agios Dimitrios	End of contract	1 July 2005	
20	FW	(Greece) Ilias Solakis	(Greece) Doxa Drama	Free transfer	26 August 2005	
29	FW	(Sweden) Christos Christoforidis	(Greece) Apollon Kalamarias	Contract termintion	21 July 2005	
39	DF	(Greece) Grigoris Toskas	(Greece) Kerkyra	End of contract	4 July 2005	
44	FW	(Greece) Nikos Voulgaris	(Greece) Kerkyra	End of contract	9 July 2005	
77	MF	(Brazil) Paulo Assunção	(Portugal) Porto	Loan return	30 June 2005	
—	FW	(Greece) Christos Kostis	(Cyprus) Alki Larnaca	End of contract	1 July 2005	

=== Loan out ===
==== Summer ====
No.	Pos.	Player	To	Fee	Date	Until	Option to buy	Source
11	FW	(Greece) Leonidas Kampantais	(Cyprus) Anorthosis Famagusta	Free	6 June 2005	30 June 2006	✗	
27	DF	(Greece) Panagiotis Stergiatos	(Greece) Doxa Drama	Free	1 July 2005	30 June 2006	✗	
—	MF	(Greece) Dimitris Karameris	(Greece) Apollon Smyrnis	Free	29 July 2005	30 June 2006	✗	
—	MF	(Greece) Nikos Pourtoulidis	(Greece) Thrasyvoulos	Free	17 June 2005	30 June 2006	✗	

==== Winter ====
No.	Pos.	Player	To	Fee	Date	Until	Option to buy	Source
15	DF	(Greece) Sokratis Papastathopoulos	(Greece) Niki Volos	Free	20 January 2006	30 June 2006	✗	
30	FW	(Cyprus) Simos Krassas	(Greece) Panionios	€75,000	5 January 2006	30 June 2006	✓	
—	FW	(Greece) Leonidas Kampantais	(Greece) Panionios	€50,000	3 January 2006	30 June 2006	✓	

=== Contract renewals ===
No.	Pos.	Player	Date	Former Exp. Date	New Exp. Date	Source
1	GK	(Italy) Stefano Sorrentino	2 November 2005	30 June 2008	30 June 2010	
99	FW	(Brazil) Júlio César	31 December 2005	31 December 2005	30 June 2008	

Notes

a. AEK Athens enabled the player's buy-out clause, prematurely. The player's loan was expiring at 30 June 2006.

=== Overall transfer activity ===
==== Expenditure ====
Summer: ▼€1,350,000

Winter: ▼€550,000

Total: ▼€1,900,000

==== Income ====
Summer: ▲€0

Winter: ▲€150,000

Total: ▲€0

==== Net Totals ====
Summer: ▼€1,350,000

Winter: ▼€400,000

Total: ▼€1,750,000

== Pre-season and friendlies ==
20 July 2005 Friendly	AEK Athens	0–4	Paris Saint-Germain	Thonon-les-Bains
20:30 EEST (UTC+3)		Report	Cissé 6'; Pauleta 11', 52' (pen.); Rozehnal 73'	Stadium: Stade Joseph-Moynat

23 July 2005 Friendly	AEK Athens	2–0	Rapid București	Cogne
19:00 EEST (UTC+3)	Venhlinskyi 40'; Krassas 52'	Report		Stadium: Cogne training center

27 July 2005 Friendly	AEK Athens	1–0	Reggina	Cogne
19:00 EEST (UTC+3)	Komvolidis 77'	Report		Stadium: Cogne training center Referee: Giorgio Lops (Italy)

6 August 2005 Friendly	Charlton Athletic	1–3	AEK Athens	London
17:00 EEST (UTC+3)	Rommedahl 33'; Jeffers (penalty missed) 62'	Report	Liberopoulos 20' (pen.); Lakis 47'; Krassas 90+1'	Stadium: The Valley; Attendance: 10,000

8 August 2005 Friendly	Chaidari	1–0	AEK Athens	Haidari
	Tsoukalidis 59'	Report		Stadium: Takis Charalambidis Stadium; Attendance: 2,000; Referee: Giannis Flabouris (Athens)

13 August 2005 Friendly	OFI	0–1	AEK Athens	Heraklion
20:30 EEST (UTC+3)		Report	Ivić 59'	Stadium: Theodoros Vardinogiannis Stadium; Attendance: 4,807; Referee: Michael Koukoulakis (Heraklion)

21 August 2005 Friendly	PAOK	2–0	AEK Athens	Thessaloniki
20:30 EEST (UTC+3)	Feutchine 48'; Christodoulopoulos 75'	Report		Stadium: Toumba Stadium; Attendance: 9,371; Referee: Dimitris Kalopoulos (Thessaloniki)

2 September 2005 Friendly	Thrasyvoulos	1–2	AEK Athens	Fyli
18:00 EEST (UTC+3)	Giannakidis 1'	Report	Papastathopoulos 26'; César 52'	Stadium: Fyli Municipal Stadium

8 October 2005 Friendly	AEK Athens	1–4	Ilisiakos	Thrakomakedones
11:00 EEST (UTC+3)	Kontis 5'	Report	Goal	Stadium: AEK Athens' training complex

== Competitions ==
=== Overall record ===
Competition	First match	Last match	Starting round	Final position	Record							
Competition	First match	Last match	Starting round	Final position	Pld	W	D	L	GF	GA	GD	Win %
Alpha Ethniki	29 August 2005	14 May 2006	Matchday 1	2nd	30	21	4	5	42	20	+22	70.00
Greek Cup	26 October 2005	10 May 2006	Round of 32	Runners-up	8	3	3	2	10	6	+4	37.50
UEFA Cup	15 September 2005	29 September 2005	First round	First round	2	0	1	1	0	1	−1	0.00
Total					40	24	8	8	52	27	+25	60.00

Last updated: 14 May 2006
Source: Competitions

=== Alpha Ethniki ===
==== League table ====
Pos	Team	Pld	W	D	L	GF	GA	GD	Pts	Qualification or relegation
1	Olympiacos (C)	30	23	1	6	63	23	+40	70	Qualification for Champions League group stage
2	AEK Athens	30	21	4	5	42	20	+22	67 (Note: Head-to-head points (goal difference): AEK 3 (+2), Panathinaikos 3 (-2).)	Qualification for Champions League third qualifying round
3	Panathinaikos	30	21	4	5	55	23	+32	67	Qualification for UEFA Cup first round
4	Iraklis	30	15	6	9	39	31	+8	51	Qualification for UEFA Cup first round
5	Skoda Xanthi	30	13	8	9	31	25	+6	47	Qualification for UEFA Cup first round

Source: Galanis Sports Data
Rules for classification: 1) Points; 2) Head-to-head points; 3) Head-to-head goal difference; 4) Goal difference; 5) Goals scored; 6) Goals against; 7) Play-offs (neutral ground); 8) Draw.
(Note: Criterion 7 is only used if needed to decide champion, teams for relegation or teams for UEFA competitions).
(C) Champions

==== Results summary ====
Overall								Home						Away					
Pld	W	D	L	GF	GA	GD	Pts	W	D	L	GF	GA	GD	W	D	L	GF	GA	GD
30	21	4	5	42	20	+22	67	12	2	1	26	8	+18	9	2	4	16	12	+4

Source: Competitive matches

==== Results by Matchday ====
Round	1	2	3	4	5	6	7	8	9	10	11	12	13	14	15	16	17	18	19	20	21	22	23	24	25	26	27	28	29	30
Ground	A	H	H	A	H	A	H	A	H	A	A	H	A	H	A	H	A	A	H	A	H	A	H	A	H	H	A	H	A	H
Result	D	W	D	W	L	W	W	W	W	W	W	W	W	W	D	W	L	W	W	L	W	L	W	W	W	W	L	W	W	D
Position	11	6	6	4	4	4	3	3	2	2	2	2	2	2	2	2	2	2	2	2	2	2	2	2	2	2	3	2	2	2

Source: Competitive matches
A = Away; H = Home; W = Win; D = Draw; L = Loss; P = Postponed

==== Matches ====
29 August 2005 1	Atromitos	0–0	AEK Athens	Peristeri
21:00 EEST (UTC+3)	Dagas (yellow card) 56'; Mikes (yellow card) 81'		Malbaša (yellow card) 16'; Georgeas (yellow card) 65'	Stadium: Peristeri Stadium; Attendance: 6,883; Referee: Michael Koukoulakis (Heraklion)

11 September 2005 2	AEK Athens	2–0	Iraklis	Marousi
20:00 EEST (UTC+3)	Liberopoulos 18'; César (yellow card) 27', (goal) 44'; Malbaša (yellow card) 38'; Venhlinskyi (yellow card) 70'; Moras (yellow card) 73'		Alemão (yellow card) 32'	Stadium: Olympic Stadium; Attendance: Behind closed doors Referee: Ilias Mazarakos (Arta)

18 September 2005 3	AEK Athens	1–1	Egaleo	Marousi
20:00 EEST (UTC+3)	Liberopoulos (yellow card) 20', (goal) 77'		Tsatsos (yellow card) 43'; Nikolopoulos (yellow card) 56'; Cesarec 71'	Stadium: Olympic Stadium; Attendance: 19,680; Referee: Michalis Germanakos (Athens)

25 September 2005 4	AEL	0–1	AEK Athens	Larissa
15:30 EEST (UTC+3)	Gavrilopoulos (yellow card) 27'; Dabizas (yellow card) 30'		Venhlinskyi 58', (yellow card) 59'; Kontis (yellow card) 73'; Soares (yellow card) 88'; Katsouranis (yellow card) 90+5'	Stadium: Alcazar Stadium; Attendance: 11,763; Referee: Thanasis Briakos (Epirus)

2 October 2005 5	AEK Athens	1–3	Olympiacos	Marousi
20:00 EEST (UTC+3)	Alexopoulos 41'; Malbaša (yellow card) 53'		Pantos (yellow card) 40'; Đorđević 54' (pen.); Georgatos (yellow card) 58'; Okkas (yellow card) 68', (goal) 88'; Konstantinou 87'	Stadium: Olympic Stadium; Attendance: 34,842; Referee: Iraklis Tsikinis (Messinia)

16 October 2005 6	Ionikos	0–1	AEK Athens	Nikaia
20:00 EEST (UTC+3)	Poulopoulos (yellow card) 36'; Melabianakis (yellow card) 36'; Tsiblidis (yellow card) 65'; King (yellow card) 86'		Kontis (yellow card) 27'; Liberopoulos 32', (yellow card) 45'; Katsouranis (penalty missed) 37'; Kyriakidis (yellow card) 85'	Stadium: Neapolis Municipal Stadium; Attendance: 1,890; Referee: Anastasios Kakos (Corfu)

23 October 2005 7	AEK Athens	3–0	Panathinaikos	Marousi
21:00 EEST (UTC+3)	Malbaša (yellow card) 39'; Lakis (yellow card) 47', (goal) 90+1'; Alexopoulos (yellow card) 78'; Liberopoulos 83'; Chanko 88'		Darlas (yellow card) 20'; González (yellow card) 40'; Vyntra (yellow card) 86'	Stadium: Olympic Stadium; Attendance: 28,623; Referee: Kyros Vassaras (Thessaloniki)

31 October 2005 8	Panionios	0–2	AEK Athens	Nea Smyrni
21:00 EET (UTC+2)	Exouzidis (yellow card) 5'; Kiassos (yellow card) 54'		Chanko (yellow card) 21'; Liberopoulos 86'; Soares 85'; Georgeas (yellow card) 86'	Stadium: Nea Smyrni Stadium; Attendance: 3,778; Referee: Christos Vasileiou (Thessaly)

5 November 2005 9	AEK Athens	2–0	Kallithea	Marousi
19:15 EET (UTC+2)	Lakis 21'; Georgeas (yellow card) 50'; Liberopoulos 52'		Venetis (yellow card) 26'	Stadium: Olympic Stadium; Attendance: 15,057; Referee: Vasilis Skoufitsas (Athens)

21 November 2005 10	Akratitos	1–2	AEK Athens	Ano Liosia
21:00 EET (UTC+2)	Aravidis (yellow card) 58'; Marinescu (yellow card) 79'; Gustavinho 83'		Lakis 10'; Sapanis (yellow card) 60'; Liberopoulos 80'; Chanko (yellow card) 90+1'	Stadium: Giannis Pathiakakis Stadium; Attendance: 1,869; Referee: Giorgos Kasnaferis (Argolida)

27 November 2005 11	Levadiakos	0–1	AEK Athens	Livadeia
19:00 EET (UTC+2)	Touré (yellow card) 56'		Kontis (yellow card) 23'; Katsouranis 29'; Georgeas (yellow card) 52'	Stadium: Levadia Municipal Stadium; Attendance: 6,000; Referee: Dimitris Kalopoulos (Thessaloniki)

4 December 2005 12	AEK Athens	2–1	PAOK	Marousi
19:15 EET (UTC+2)	Cirillo 26', (yellow card) 53'; Katsouranis (yellow card) 44'; Chanko (yellow card) 67'; Soares 90+1'		Mięciel 20'; Charalambous (yellow card) 41'; Balafas (yellow card) 48'; Vangelis (yellow card) 66'	Stadium: Olympic Stadium; Attendance: 27,247; Referee: Thanasis Briakos (Epirus)

10 December 2005 13	OFI	0–1	AEK Athens	Heraklion
16:00 EET (UTC+2)	Khachatryan (yellow card) 55' (yellow-red card) 75'; Sfakianakis (yellow card) 83'		Ivić (yellow card) 22'; Chanko (yellow card) 45+2'; Cirillo (yellow card) 52'; Katsouranis (yellow card) 64'; César 71', (yellow card) 81'	Stadium: Pankritio Stadium; Attendance: 4,993; Referee: Dimitris Kalopoulos (Thessaloniki)

17 December 2005 14	AEK Athens	2–1	Apollon Kalamarias	Marousi
19:00 EET (UTC+2)	Katsouranis (yellow card) 63'; Liberopoulos 77'; Malbaša (yellow card) 79'; Alexopoulos 90'		Papadopoulos (yellow card) 75'; Orfanos 87'	Stadium: Olympic Stadium; Attendance: Behind closed doors Referee: Vasilis Paboridis (Kilkis)

8 January 2006 15	Skoda Xanthi	0–0	AEK Athens	Xanthi
19:00 EET (UTC+2)	Fliskas (yellow card) 25'; Labriakos (yellow card) 47'		Liberopoulos (yellow card) 21'; Alexopoulos (yellow card) 27'; Soares (yellow card) 41'; Ivić (yellow card) 56'; Moras (yellow card) 75'	Stadium: Skoda Xanthi Arena; Attendance: 5,332; Referee: Dimitris Dabosis (Pieria)

14 January 2006 16	AEK Athens	2–1	Atromitos	Marousi
19:30 EET (UTC+2)	Liberopoulos 31'; Georgeas (red card) 44'; Venhlinskyi 89', (yellow card) 90'; Kontis (yellow card) 90+1'		Zacharopoulos 45' (pen.), (yellow card) 75'; Raguel (yellow card) 47'; Doe (yellow card) 69'; Pappas (yellow card) 83'	Stadium: Olympic Stadium; Attendance: 10,443; Referee: Apostolos Nikolaidis (Thessaloniki)

29 January 2006 17	Iraklis	4–0	AEK Athens	Thessaloniki
19:00 EET (UTC+2)	Lagos 14', 74', (yellow card) 81'; Epalle (yellow card) 52', (goal) 83'; Herrera 62'		Cirillo (yellow card) 52'	Stadium: Kaftanzoglio Stadium; Attendance: 9,490; Referee: Vasilis Terovitsas (Aetoloacarnania)

4 February 2006 18	Egaleo	0–2	AEK Athens	Egaleo
17:45 EET (UTC+2)	Omo (yellow card) 60' (yellow-red card) 71'		Emerson (yellow card) 38'; Liberopoulos 84'; Cirillo 90+1'	Stadium: Stavros Mavrothalassitis Stadium; Attendance: 2,969; Referee: Giorgos Kasnaferis (Argolida)

12 February 2006 19	AEK Athens	1–0	AEL	Marousi
19:30 EET (UTC+2)	Katsouranis 13'; Kontis (yellow card) 42'		Galitsios (yellow card) 37'	Stadium: Olympic Stadium; Attendance: 18,646; Referee: Anastasios Kakos (Corfu)

19 February 2006 20	Olympiacos	3–0	AEK Athens	Piraeus
20:00 EET (UTC+2)	Georgatos (yellow card) 60'; Stoltidis (red card) 78'; Okkas 88'; Rivaldo 65', 90+3', (yellow card) 66'		Cirillo (yellow card) 19'; Lakis (yellow card) 34'; Georgeas (yellow card) 39'; Ivić (yellow card) 79'; Venhlinskyi (yellow card) 82'; Kontis (yellow card) 83'	Stadium: Karaiskakis Stadium; Attendance: 31,127; Referee: Iraklis Tsikinis (Messinia)

26 February 2006 21	AEK Athens	2–0	Ionikos	Marousi
19:30 EET (UTC+2)	Venhlinskyi 21'; Lakis (yellow card) 35'; Moras (yellow card) 84'; Ivić (yellow card) 87'; Katsouranis 90+8'		Perrone 39', (yellow card) 86'; Gutman (yellow card) 76'; Vourexakis (yellow card) 81'; Onwuachi (yellow card) 84'; Ucar (yellow card) 90'	Stadium: Olympic Stadium; Attendance: 11,591; Referee: Dimitris Kalopoulos (Thessaloniki)

5 March 2006 22	Panathinaikos	1–0	AEK Athens	Marousi
19:15 EET (UTC+2)	Charalambidis (yellow card) 44'; Morris (yellow card) 51'; Bišćan 52'; Gekas (penalty missed) 90+2'		Liberopoulos (yellow card) 39'; Katsouranis (yellow card) 47'; Kontis (yellow card) 90+1'	Stadium: Olympic Stadium; Attendance: 31,446; Referee: Giorgos Kasnaferis (Argolida)

12 March 2006 23	AEK Athens	2–0	Panionios	Marousi
19:30 EET (UTC+2)	Katsouranis 20'; Ivić (yellow card) 27', (goal) 71'; Cirillo (yellow card) 53'			Stadium: Olympic Stadium; Attendance: 8,353; Referee: Antonis Kouklakis (Chania)

18 March 2006 24	Kallithea	1–4	AEK Athens	Kallithea
19:00 EET (UTC+2)	Cléber (yellow card) 53'; Tsigas 83'		Ivić 11'; Katsouranis (yellow card) 28'; Alexopoulos 44'; Georgeas (yellow card) 73'; Emerson 77'; Kapetanos 90+3'	Stadium: Grigoris Lambrakis Stadium; Attendance: 2,805; Referee: Giorgos Kasnaferis (Argolida)

26 March 2006 25	AEK Athens	2–0	Akratitos	Marousi
19:00 EEST (UTC+3)	Liberopoulos 18', 37'; Emerson (yellow card) 22'		Apostolakis (yellow card) 7'	Stadium: Olympic Stadium; Attendance: 11,894; Referee: Dimitris Detsis (Athens)

2 April 2006 26	AEK Athens	2–0	Levadiakos	Marousi
19:00 EEST (UTC+3)	Ivić 36'; Georgeas (yellow card) 55'; Liberopoulos 59'		Anderson (yellow card) 90+2'	Stadium: Olympic Stadium; Attendance: 14,140; Referee: Theofilos Fotiadis (Thessaloniki)

9 April 2006 27	PAOK	2–1	AEK Athens	Thessaloniki
19:00 EEST (UTC+3)	Alexopoulos 73' (o.g.); Salpingidis 79'; Konstantinidis (yellow card) 90+3'		Katsouranis 90+1' (pen.); Cirillo (yellow card) 90+3'	Stadium: Toumba Stadium; Attendance: 10,300; Referee: Michael Koukoulakis (Heraklion)

16 April 2006 28	AEK Athens	2–0	OFI	Marousi
19:00 EEST (UTC+3)	Katsouranis 7'; Liberopoulos 34', (yellow card) 47'		Konstantinidis (yellow card) 19'; Dentsas (yellow card) 60'; Ednilson (yellow card) 87'	Stadium: Olympic Stadium; Attendance: 13,882; Referee: Dimitris Kalopoulos (Thessaloniki)

30 April 2006 29	Apollon Kalamarias	0–1	AEK Athens	Thessaloniki
20:00 EEST (UTC+3)	Orfanos (yellow card) 65'		Alexopoulos (yellow card) 23'; Lakis 62'	Stadium: Kalamaria Stadium; Attendance: 2,144; Referee: Ilias Mazarakos (Arta)

14 May 2006 30	AEK Athens	0–0	Skoda Xanthi	Marousi
20:00 EEST (UTC+3)	Katsouranis (yellow card) 26'		Paviot (yellow card) 47'	Stadium: Olympic Stadium; Attendance: 21,779; Referee: Dimitris Dabosis (Pieria)

=== Greek Cup ===
AEK Athens entered the Greek Cup at the round of 32.

==== Round of 32 ====
26 October 2005 Round of 32	PAS Giannina	0–3	AEK Athens	Ioannina
16:00 EET (UTC+2)	Singbo (yellow card) 6' (yellow-red card) 35'; Dasios (yellow card) 40'; Mangos (yellow card) 42'; Bellaj (yellow card) 47'	Report	Papastathopoulos 7'; Soares 29'; Moras 41', (yellow card) 69'; Sapanis (yellow card) 61'; Bourbos (yellow card) 90+2'	Stadium: Zosimades Stadium; Attendance: 5,000; Referee: Vasilis Terovitsas (Aetoloacarnania)

==== Round of 16 ====
21 December 2005 Round of 16	AEK Athens	1–1	Ethnikos Piraeus	Marousi
16:00 EET (UTC+2)	Pliatsikas (yellow card) 80'; Soares 90+1'; Liberopoulos (yellow card) 90+3'	Report	Tzimas (yellow card) 82'; Da Silva 90+3'	Stadium: Olympic Stadium; Attendance: Behind closed doors Referee: Michael Koukoulakis (Heraklion)

11 January 2006 Replay match	Ethnikos Piraeus	1–1 (a.e.t.) (2–2 agg.) (3–4 p)	AEK Athens	Rizoupoli
19:00 EET (UTC+2)	Papapanagiotou (yellow card) 67'; Karamalikis (yellow card) 112'; Petrov 119'	Report	Pliatsikas (yellow card) 90+1'; Kyriakidis (yellow card) 103'; Cirillo 113', (yellow card) 114'	Stadium: Georgios Kamaras Stadium; Attendance: 3,000; Referee: Anastasios Kakos (Corfu)
	Penalties
	Morales (penalty missed); Da Silva (penalty scored); Dovas (penalty scored); Petrov (penalty scored); Kouboulis (penalty missed)		(penalty scored) Katsouranis; (penalty scored) Dellas; (penalty scored) Kontis; (penalty missed) Júlio César; (penalty scored) Cirillo

==== Quarter-finals ====
8 February 2006 First leg	Niki Volos	0–0	AEK Athens	Volos
19:00 EET (UTC+2)		Report	Pliatsikas (yellow card) 22'; Moras (yellow card) 49'	Stadium: Panthessaliko Stadium; Attendance: 3,000; Referee: Lazaros Polatian (Pella)

22 February 2006 Second leg	AEK Athens	2–0 (2–0 agg.)	Niki Volos	Marousi
19:30 EET (UTC+2)	Liberopoulos 26'; Katsouranis (yellow card) 30', (goal) 68' (pen.); Ivić (yellow card) 65'	Report	Balafas (yellow card) 15'; Koutsogiannis (yellow card) 61'	Stadium: Olympic Stadium; Attendance: 4,629; Referee: Vasilis Terovitsas (Aetoloacarnania)

==== Semi-finals ====
21 March 2006 First leg	AEK Athens	3–0	Agrotikos Asteras	Marousi
19:00 EET (UTC+2)	Chiotis (yellow card) 27'; Emerson (yellow card) 57'; Liberopoulos 59'; Moras 80'; Sapanis 85'	Report	Papadopoulos (yellow card) 25'; Tsouklis (yellow card) 29'; Kosmidis (yellow card) 42'; Kalliakis (yellow card) 45+1'	Stadium: Olympic Stadium; Attendance: 4,102; Referee: Romanos Kontogiannidis (Xanthi)

12 April 2006 Second leg	Agrotikos Asteras	1–0 (1–3 agg.)	AEK Athens	Thessaloniki
16:00 EEST (UTC+3)	Tziokas (yellow card) 42'; Tsouklis 90'	Report	Malbaša (yellow card) 55'	Stadium: Agrotikos Asteras Stadium; Attendance: 5,000; Referee: Lazaros Polatian (Pella)

==== Final ====
10 May 2006 Final	Olympiacos	3–0	AEK Athens	Heraklion
18:30 EEST (UTC+3)	Touré (yellow card) 32'; Konstantinou (yellow card) 41', (goal) 61'; Ivić 70' (o.g.); Kafes (yellow card) 83'; Castillo 90'	Report	Cirillo (yellow card) 29'; Emerson (yellow card) 34'; Georgeas (yellow card) 46'; Dellas (yellow card) 50'; Katsouranis (yellow card) 78'	Stadium: Pankritio Stadium; Attendance: 22,079; Referee: Vasilis Terovitsas (Aetoloacarnania)

=== UEFA Cup ===
==== First round ====
15 September 2005 First leg	Zenit Saint Petersburg (Russia)	0–0	(Greece) AEK Athens	Saint Petersburg, Russia
18:00 EEST (UTC+3)	Anyukov (yellow card) 57'	Report	Katsouranis (yellow card) 12'; Alexopoulos (yellow card) 53'; Kontis (yellow card) 70'	Stadium: Petrovsky Stadium; Attendance: 25,000; Referee: Tommy Skjerven (Norway)

29 September 2005 Second leg	AEK Athens (Greece)	0–1 (0–1 agg.)	(Russia) Zenit Saint Petersburg	Athens, Greece
21:45 EEST (UTC+3)	Kontis (yellow card) 78'	Report	Mareš (yellow card) 82'; Arshavin 89', (yellow card) 90+3'	Stadium: Olympic Stadium; Attendance: 23,121; Referee: Florian Meyer (Germany)

== Statistics ==
=== Squad statistics ===
As of 14 May 2006

No.	Pos	Player	Alpha Ethniki		Greek Cup		UEFA Cup		Total	
No.	Pos	Player	Apps	Goals	Apps	Goals	Apps	Goals	Apps	Goals
Goalkeepers
1	GK	(Italy) Stefano Sorrentino	25	0	3	0	2	0	30	0
12	GK	(Greece) Giannis Arabatzis	0	0	0	0	0	0	0	0
22	GK	(Greece) Dionysis Chiotis	5	0	5	0	0	0	10	0
Defenders
3	DF	(Serbia and Montenegro) Nikola Malbaša	16	0	3	0	2	0	21	0
5	DF	(Italy) Bruno Cirillo	24	2	2	1	2	0	28	3
6	DF	(Greece) Georgios Alexopoulos	30	3	3	0	2	0	35	3
14	DF	(Greece) Stavros Tziortziopoulos	9	0	4	0	0	0	13	0
18	DF	(Greece) Vangelis Moras	13	0	6	2	1	0	20	2
19	DF	(Greece) Dimitrios Koutromanos	0	0	1	0	0	0	1	0
24	DF	(Greece) Christos Kontis	15	0	4	0	2	0	21	0
31	DF	(Greece) Nikolaos Georgeas	25	0	5	0	0	0	30	0
55	DF	(Greece) Traianos Dellas	6	0	6	0	0	0	12	0
Midfielders
8	MF	(Greece) Miltiadis Sapanis	12	0	3	1	0	0	15	1
10	MF	(Greece) Panagiotis Kone	0	0	1	0	0	0	1	0
17	MF	(Serbia and Montenegro) Vladan Ivić	27	3	5	0	2	0	34	3
20	MF	(Greece) Vasilios Pliatsikas	3	0	4	0	0	0	7	0
21	MF	(Greece) Kostas Katsouranis	29	6	4	1	2	0	35	7
23	MF	(Greece) Vasilios Lakis	28	4	5	0	1	0	34	4
25	MF	(Brazil) Emerson	13	1	4	0	0	0	17	1
26	MF	(Greece) Ilias Kyriakidis	3	0	7	0	1	0	11	0
27	MF	(Sweden) Louay Chanko	21	1	4	0	1	0	26	1
28	MF	(Greece) Christos Bourbos	0	0	1	0	0	0	1	0
—	MF	(Greece) Panagiotis Zorbas	0	0	0	0	0	0	0	0
Forwards
7	FW	(Brazil) Alessandro Soares	28	2	8	2	2	0	38	4
9	FW	(Greece) Angelos Komvolidis	0	0	0	0	0	0	0	0
11	FW	(Ukraine) Oleh Venhlinskyi	15	3	4	0	2	0	21	3
33	FW	(Greece) Nikos Liberopoulos	27	14	5	2	2	0	34	16
35	FW	(Greece) Pantelis Kapetanos	10	1	4	0	0	0	14	1
99	FW	(Brazil) Júlio César	28	2	7	0	2	0	37	2
Left during Winter Transfer Window
15	DF	(Greece) Sokratis Papastathopoulos	0	0	2	1	0	0	2	1
30	FW	(Cyprus) Simos Krassas	3	0	1	0	1	0	5	0

=== Goalscorers ===
As of 14 May 2006
The list is sorted by competition order when total goals are equal, then by position and then by squad number.

Rank	No.	Pos.	Player	Alpha Ethniki	Greek Cup	UEFA Cup	Total
1	33	FW	(Greece) Nikos Liberopoulos	14	2	0	16
2	21	MF	(Greece) Kostas Katsouranis	6	1	0	7
3	23	MF	(Greece) Vasilios Lakis	4	0	0	4
3	7	FW	(Brazil) Alessandro Soares	2	2	0	4
5	6	DF	(Greece) Georgios Alexopoulos	3	0	0	3
5	17	MF	(Serbia and Montenegro) Vladan Ivić	3	0	0	3
5	11	FW	(Ukraine) Oleh Venhlinskyi	3	0	0	3
5	5	DF	(Italy) Bruno Cirillo	2	1	0	3
9	99	FW	(Brazil) Júlio César	2	0	0	2
9	18	DF	(Greece) Vangelis Moras	0	2	0	2
11	25	MF	(Brazil) Emerson	1	0	0	1
11	27	MF	(Sweden) Louay Chanko	1	0	0	1
11	35	FW	(Greece) Pantelis Kapetanos	1	0	0	1
11	15	DF	(Greece) Sokratis Papastathopoulos	0	1	0	1
11	8	MF	(Greece) Miltiadis Sapanis	0	1	0	1
Own goals				0	0	0	0
Totals				42	10	0	52

=== Assists ===
As of 14 May 2006
The list is sorted by competition order when total assists are equal, then by position and then by squad number.

Rank	No.	Pos.	Player	Alpha Ethniki	Greek Cup	UEFA Cup	Total
1	99	FW	(Brazil) Júlio César	10	0	0	10
2	21	MF	(Greece) Kostas Katsouranis	4	0	0	4
2	23	MF	(Greece) Vasilios Lakis	4	0	0	4
4	31	DF	(Greece) Nikolaos Georgeas	3	0	0	3
4	17	MF	(Serbia and Montenegro) Vladan Ivić	3	0	0	3
4	33	FW	(Greece) Nikos Liberopoulos	3	0	0	3
7	3	DF	(Serbia and Montenegro) Nikola Malbaša	2	0	0	2
7	7	FW	(Brazil) Alessandro Soares	2	0	0	2
9	18	DF	(Greece) Vangelis Moras	1	0	0	1
Totals				32	0	0	32

=== Clean sheets ===
As of 14 May 2006
The list is sorted by competition order when total clean sheets are equal and then by squad number. Clean sheets in games where both goalkeepers participated are awarded to the goalkeeper who started the game. Goalkeepers with no appearances are not included.

Rank	No.	Player	Alpha Ethniki	Greek Cup	UEFA Cup	Total
1	28	(Italy) Stefano Sorrentino	15	1	1	17
2	22	(Greece) Dionysis Chiotis	3	3	0	6
Totals			18	4	1	23

=== Disciplinary record ===
As of 14 May 2006

N	P	Nat.	Name	Alpha Ethniki			Greek Cup			UEFA Cup			Total			Notes
N	P	Nat.	Name	Yellow card	Second yellow card	Red card	Yellow card	Second yellow card	Red card	Yellow card	Second yellow card	Red card	Yellow card	Second yellow card	Red card	Notes
Goalkeepers
1	GK	(Italy)	Stefano Sorrentino													
12	GK	(Greece)	Giannis Arabatzis													
22	GK	(Greece)	Dionysis Chiotis				1						1			
Defenders
3	DF	(Serbia and Montenegro)	Nikola Malbaša	5			1						6			
5	DF	(Italy)	Bruno Cirillo	7			2						9			
6	DF	(Greece)	Georgios Alexopoulos	3						1			4			
14	DF	(Greece)	Stavros Tziortziopoulos													
18	DF	(Greece)	Vangelis Moras	3			2						5			
19	DF	(Greece)	Dimitrios Koutromanos													
24	DF	(Greece)	Christos Kontis	7						2			9			
31	DF	(Greece)	Nikolaos Georgeas	6		1	1						7		1	
55	DF	(Greece)	Traianos Dellas				1						1			
Midfielders
8	MF	(Greece)	Miltiadis Sapanis	1			1						2			
10	MF	(Greece)	Panagiotis Kone													
17	MF	(Serbia and Montenegro)	Vladan Ivić	5			1						6			
20	MF	(Greece)	Vasilios Pliatsikas				3						3			
21	MF	(Greece)	Kostas Katsouranis	7			2			1			10			
23	MF	(Greece)	Vasilios Lakis	3									3			
25	MF	(Brazil)	Emerson	2			2						4			
26	MF	(Greece)	Ilias Kyriakidis	1			1						2			
27	MF	(Sweden)	Louay Chanko	4									4			
28	MF	(Greece)	Christos Bourbos				1						1			
—	MF	(Greece)	Panagiotis Zorbas													
Forwards
7	FW	(Brazil)	Alessandro Soares	2			1						3			
9	FW	(Greece)	Angelos Komvolidis													
11	FW	(Ukraine)	Oleh Venhlinskyi	3									3			
33	FW	(Greece)	Nikos Liberopoulos	5			1						6			
35	FW	(Greece)	Pantelis Kapetanos													
99	FW	(Brazil)	Júlio César	3									3			
Left during Winter Transfer window
15	DF	(Greece)	Sokratis Papastathopoulos													
30	FW	(Cyprus)	Simos Krassas													

=== Starting 11 ===
This section presents the most frequently used formation along with the players with the most starts across all competitions.

N.	Formation	Matchday(s)
27	4–4–2	1,2 4–6, 8–16, 18–30
6	4–3–3
4	4–2–1–3	3, 7, 17
2	4–4–2 (D)
1	5–4–1

No.	Nat.	Player	Pos.
28	(Italy)	Stefano Sorrentino	GK
5	(Italy)	Bruno Cirillo	RCB
6	(Greece)	Georgios Alexopoulos	LCB
21	(Greece)	Kostas Katsouranis (C)	RB
31	(Greece)	Nikolaos Georgeas	LB
25	(Brazil)	Emerson	DM
17	(Serbia and Montenegro)	Vladan Ivić	CM
23	(Greece)	Vasilios Lakis	RM
99	(Brazil)	Júlio César	LM
7	(Brazil)	Alessandro Soares	SS
33	(Greece)	Nikos Liberopoulos	CF

Last updated: 2006-05-14

=== UEFA rankings ===
UEFA team ranking

#	Form	Previous	Country	Team	Ranking
54		49	(Spain)	Mallorca	40.006
—		49	(Spain)	Málaga	40.006
56		78	(France)	Lens	39.757
57		38	(Greece)	AEK Athens	39.587
58		39	(Belgium)	Anderlecht	38.981
59		55	(Turkey)	Beşiktaş	38.634

UEFA country ranking

#	Form	Previous	Country	League	Ranking
6		6	(Portugal)	Liga Sagres	44.041
7		7	(Netherlands)	Eredivisie	41.331
8		8	(Greece)	Alpha Ethniki	32.081
9		13	(Russia)	Russian Premier League	31.833
10		25	(Romania)	Liga I	31.457

== Awards ==
Player	Pos.	Award	Source
(Greece) Nikos Liberopoulos	FW	Greek Player of the Season (shared)	
