= 2006 Greek Football Cup final =

2006 Greek Cup final
- Event: 2005–06 Greek Football Cup
Olympiacos	AEK Athens
3	0
- Date: 10 May 2006
- Venue: Pankritio Stadium, Heraklion
- Man of the Match: Michalis Konstantinou (Olympiacos)
- Referee: Vasilis Terovitsas (Aetoloacarnania)
- Attendance: 22,079
- Weather: Fair; 18 °C (64 °F); 73% humidity

The 2006 Greek Cup final was the 62nd final of the Greek Cup. The match took place on 10 May 2006 at Pankritio Stadium. The contesting teams were Olympiacos and AEK Athens. It was Olympiacos' thirty-second Greek Cup final and third consecutive in their 81 years of existence and AEK Athens' eighteenth Greek Cup final in their 82-year history.

== Venue ==
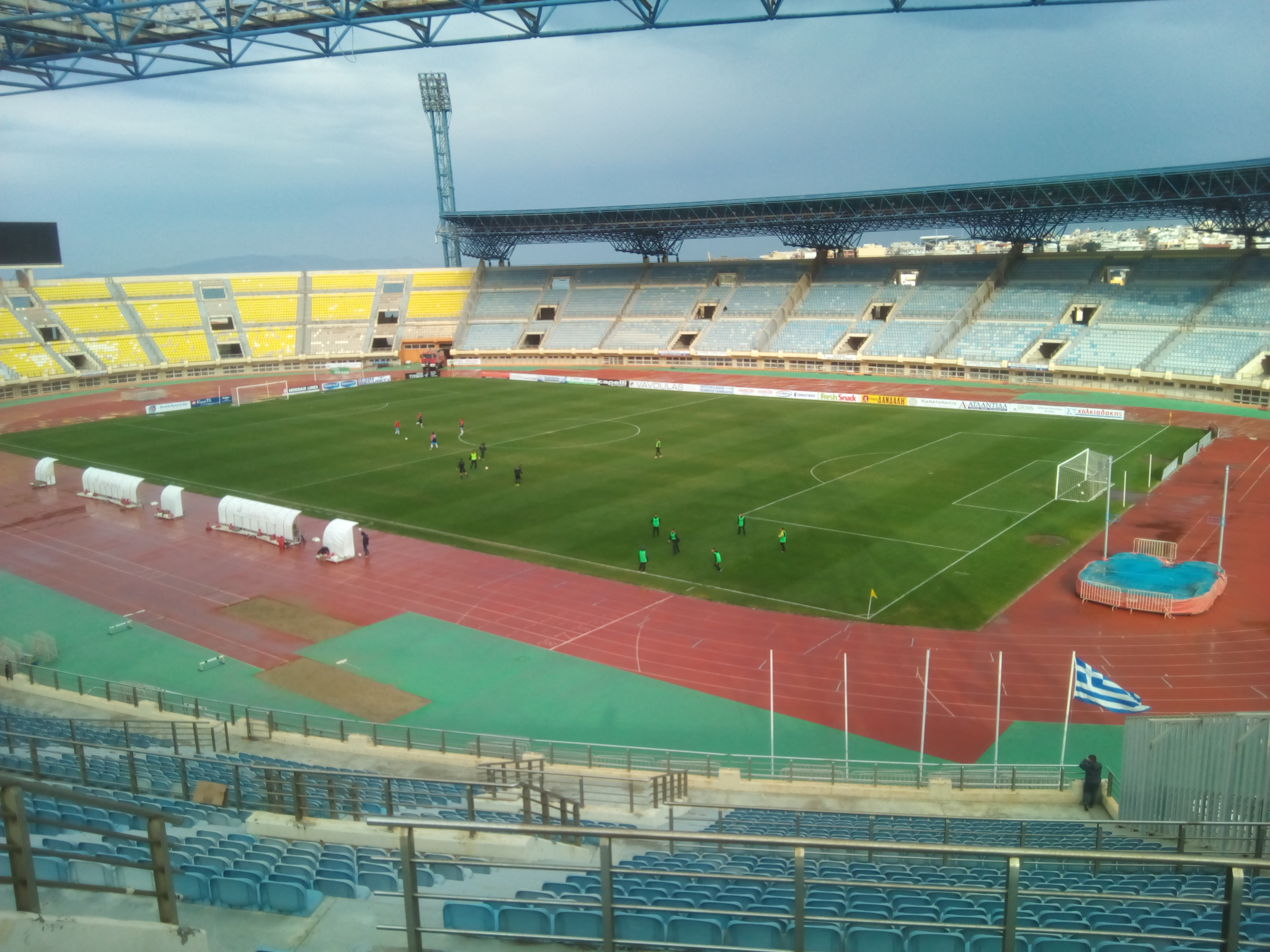
Pankritio Stadium.

This was the first Greek Cup final held at Pankritio Stadium.

Pankritio Stadium was built in 2003. The stadium is used as a venue for Ergotelis and OFI and was used for Greece in 2004. Its current capacity is 26,240.

== Background ==
Olympiacos had reached the Greek Cup final thirty one times, winning twenty one of them. The last time that they had played in a final was in 2005, where they had won against Aris by 3–0.

AEK Athens had reached the Greek Cup final seventeen times, winning eleven of them. The last time that they had played in a final was in 2002, where they had won against Olympiacos by 2–1.

The two teams had met each other in a Cup final three times in the 1953, 1956 and 2002 finals.

== Route to the final ==
Olympiacos				Round	AEK Athens			
Opponent	Agg.	1st leg	2nd leg		Opponent	Agg.	1st leg	2nd leg
Paniliakos	4–0 (A)			Round of 32	PAS Giannina	3–0 (A)		
Thrasyvoulos	2–0 (A)			Round of 16	Ethnikos Piraeus	2–2 (4–3 p)	1–1 (H)	1–1 (a.e.t.) (A)
Skoda Xanthi	2–1	1–1 (H)	1–0 (A)	Quarter-finals	Niki Volos	2–0	0–0 (A)	2–0 (H)
AEL	4–1	3–1 (H)	1–0 (A)	Semi-finals	Agrotikos Asteras	3–1	3–0 (H)	0–1 (A)

== Match ==
=== Details ===
10 May 2006
20:30 EEST

Olympiacos	3–0	AEK Athens
Konstantinou 61'; Ivić 70' (o.g.); Castillo 90'	Report

Pankritio Stadium, Heraklion
Attendance: 22,079
Referee: Vasilis Terovitsas (Aetoloacarnania)

Olympiacos	AEK Athens

GK	71	(Greece) Antonios Nikopolidis
RB	14	(Greece) Dimitrios Mavrogenidis
CB	32	(Greece) Georgios Anatolakis
CB	12	(Argentina) Gabriel Schürrer
LB	22	(Turkey) Erol Bulut
DM	6	(Greece) Ieroklis Stoltidis
CM	15	(Ivory Coast) Yaya Touré	(yellow card) 32'	(substituted off) 67'
AM	1	(Greece) Pantelis Kafes	(yellow card) 83'
RW	9	(Cyprus) Ioannis Okkas		(substituted off) 77'
LW	11	(Serbia and Montenegro) Predrag Đorđević (c)
CF	23	(Cyprus) Michalis Konstantinou	(yellow card) 41'	(substituted off) 90+2'
Substitutes:
GK	33	(Belgium) Erwin Lemmens
DF	19	(Greece) Athanasios Kostoulas
DF	21	(Greece) Grigoris Georgatos
MF	8	(Serbia and Montenegro) Miloš Marić		(substituted on) 67'
FW	7	(Mexico) Nery Castillo		(substituted on) 77'
FW	20	(Spain) Dani Garcia		(substituted on) 90+2'
FW	40	(Nigeria) Haruna Babangida
Manager:
(Norway) Trond Sollied

GK	1	(Italy) Stefano Sorrentino
RB	31	(Greece) Nikolaos Georgeas	(yellow card) 46'
CB	5	(Italy) Bruno Cirillo	(yellow card) 29'
CB	55	(Greece) Traianos Dellas	(yellow card) 50'	(substituted off) 71'
LB	14	(Greece) Stavros Tziortziopoulos
CM	21	(Greece) Kostas Katsouranis (c)	(yellow card) 78'
DM	25	(Brazil) Emerson	(yellow card) 34'
AM	17	(Serbia and Montenegro) Vladimir Ivić
RW	23	(Greece) Vasilios Lakis
LW	99	(Brazil) Júlio César		(substituted off) 76'
CF	33	(Greece) Nikos Liberopoulos		(substituted off) 84'
Substitutes:
GK	22	(Greece) Dionisis Chiotis
DF	6	(Greece) Georgios Alexopoulos		(substituted on) 84'
DF	24	(Greece) Christos Kontis
MF	20	(Greece) Vasilios Pliatsikas
MF	26	(Greece) Ilias Kyriakidis
FW	7	(Brazil) Alessandro Soares		(substituted on) 71'
FW	35	(Greece) Pantelis Kapetanos		(substituted on) 76'
Manager:
(Portugal) Fernando Santos

Man of the Match:
(Cyprus) Michalis Konstantinou (Olympiacos)

Assistant referees:
Dimitris Saraidaris (Thessaloniki)
Konstantinos Panou (Thessaloniki)

Match rules

- 90 minutes
- 30 minutes of extra time if necessary
- Penalty shootout if scores still level
- Seven named substitutes
- Maximum of three substitutions

== See also ==
- 2005–06 Greek Football Cup
