= Sokratis Papastathopoulos =

Greek footballer (born 1988)

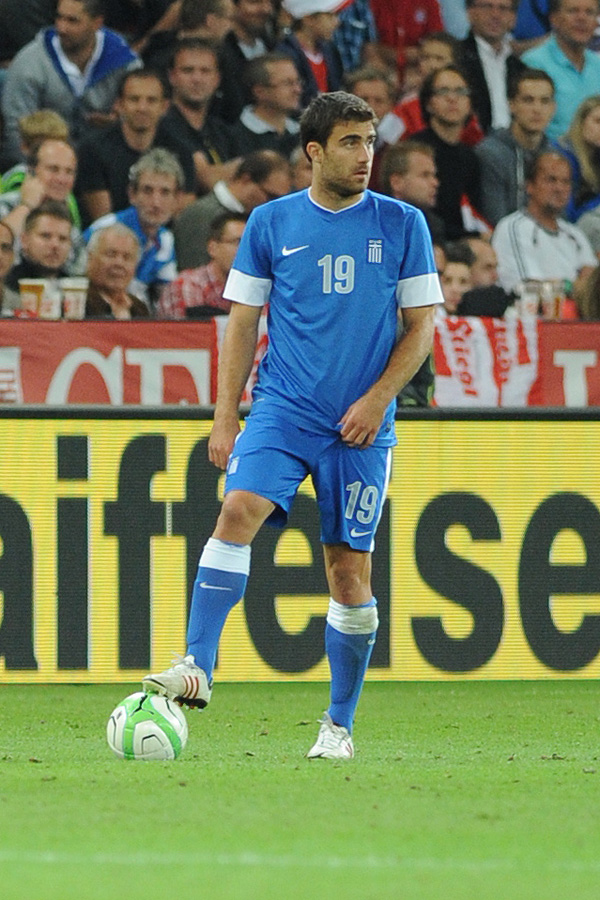
- Papastathopoulos playing for Greece in 2013

Personal information
- Full name: Sokratis Papastathopoulos
- Date of birth: 9 June 1988 (age 38)
- Place of birth: Kalamata, Greece
- Height: 1.86 m (6 ft 1 in)
- Position: Centre-back

Youth career
- Eantas Kalamatas
- –2005: Apollon Petalidiou

Senior career*
Years	Team	Apps	(Gls)
2005–2008	AEK Athens	42	(1)
2006	→ Niki Volos (loan)	11	(0)
2008–2010	Genoa	51	(2)
2010–2011	AC Milan	5	(0)
2011–2012	Genoa	0	(0)
2011–2012	→ Werder Bremen (loan)	30	(1)
2012–2013	Werder Bremen	29	(1)
2013–2018	Borussia Dortmund	130	(7)
2018–2021	Arsenal	44	(3)
2021–2023	Olympiacos	66	(4)
2023–2024	Real Betis	15	(0)
Total		423	(19)

International career
2003–2005	Greece U17	11	(2)
2005–2007	Greece U19	13	(2)
2007–2010	Greece U21	7	(2)
2008–2019	Greece	90	(3)
Medal record
Men's football
Representing Greece
UEFA European Under-19 Championship
Runner-up	2007 Austria
- * Club domestic league appearances and goals

Sokratis Papastathopoulos (Greek: Σωκράτης Παπασταθόπουλος; born 9 June 1988), also known mononymously as Sokratis, is a Greek former professional footballer who played as a centre-back.

== Club career ==
=== AEK Athens ===
On 21 June 2005, Papastathopoulos joined AEK Athens from Apollon Petalidiou after being scouted by Toni Savevski. On 26 October 2005, he made his debut for AEK in a Greek Cup match against PAS Giannina, scoring in the seventh minute of the game to help lead AEK to a 3–0 win.

In January 2006, he was loaned to Beta Ethniki club Niki Volos for six months to gain first-team football experience. He made 15 appearances for Niki Volos.

During the 2006–07 Super League Greece, Papastathopoulos managed to make 14 appearances whilst competing against the likes of Bruno Cirillo, Traianos Dellas and Vangelis Moras. In AEK Athens' 2006–07 UEFA Champions League campaign, Papastathopoulos managed to play in three out of six group games. In these three games, AEK managed one win (the famous 1–0 victory over A.C. Milan, where he man-marked Filippo Inzaghi), one draw (the 2–2 away draw with Anderlecht) and one loss (the 3–1 away defeat to Lille). During the 2007–08 Super League Greece, he was a mainstay in AEK's defence, keeping out competition from Geraldo Alves. He also played in the 2007–08 Champions League campaign, and in a Super League match, he became AEK's youngest-ever captain (age 19) in a game against Athens' local rival Panathinaikos in 2008.

=== Genoa ===
On 1 August 2008, Papastathopoulos agreed to transfer to Genoa of the Italian Serie A for €4 million. He also played a club friendly against Genoa on the same day.

He made his debut for Genoa on 27 September 2008 against Fiorentina, followed by a start against Ravenna in the Coppa Italia a few days later. His first goal for Genoa came on 5 October 2008 at home against Napoli. Genoa won the game 3–2, but Papastathopoulos was sent off in the 89th minute During the 2009–10 season, he managed to play in most games and gained a following.

=== AC Milan ===
On 20 July 2010, the AC Milan website confirmed that Papastathopoulos had joined the team, after Genoa and Milan reached an agreement to transfer Papastathopoulos to the club for €14 million, with the following payment schedule: Gianmarco Zigoni (half of his registration rights, valued at €3.75 million), Nnamdi Oduamadi (half of his rights, valued at €3.5 million) and Rodney Strasser (half of his rights, valued at €2.25 million) in a co-ownership deal, plus €4.5 million. Papastathopoulos was the club's first arrival under new manager Massimiliano Allegri.

On 24 May 2011, Milan and Genoa executives Adriano Galliani and Enrico Preziosi, respectively, verbally agreed to settle the player ownerships (subject to player agreements) of Kevin-Prince Boateng, Alberto Paloschi, Marco Amelia and Giacomo Beretta. The deal entailed that Milan buy back Gianmarco Zigoni, Rodney Strasser and Nnamdi Oduamadi (all under original price), while Genoa buy back Papastathopoulos for €13 million, which effectively made the de facto loan cost for Milan €1 million.

=== Werder Bremen ===
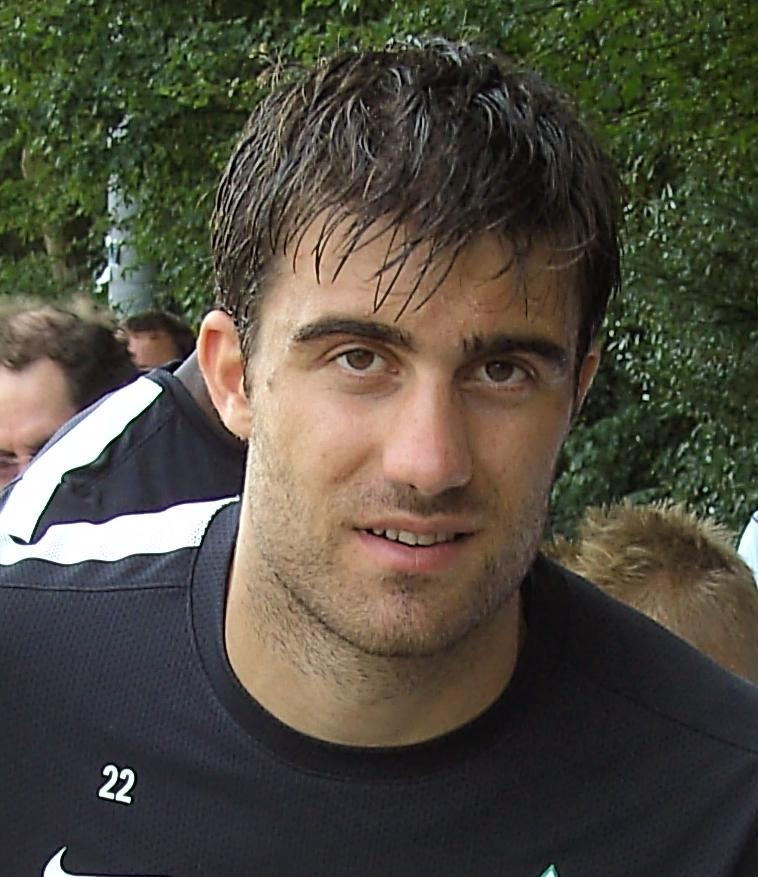
Papastathopoulos with Werder Bremen in 2012

On 21 July 2011, Papastathopoulos moved to the Germany club Werder Bremen on a loan deal until the end of the 2011–12 season, with the option to purchase outright. Following impressive performances on loan, on 16 April 2012, it was announced that Papastathopoulos would join Bremen on a permanent basis for a €5 million transfer fee. The 2012–13 season, however, was not a good one for the club. In March 2013, in the midst of a relegation battle and with tensions high, Papastathopoulos engaged in a training ground brawl with teammate Marko Arnautović. Bremen would ultimately finish the year in 14th, staving-off relegation.

=== Borussia Dortmund ===
On 24 May 2013, the eve of the 2013 Champions League Final between Bayern Munich and Borussia Dortmund, Papastathopoulos completed a €9.5 million transfer to Dortmund, agreeing to a five-year contract through to 2018. Upon signing, he spoke about the deal, saying, "Money did not play a role in my decision to join Dortmund. My own future was all that mattered and I am convinced that I made the right decision." With centre-back Felipe Santana departing Dortmund for Schalke 04, Papastathopoulos began as the effective third-choice behind tandem Neven Subotić and Mats Hummels. Borussia Dortmund Sporting Director Michael Zorc expressed his satisfaction with the deal: "We are delighted that Sokratis has decided to join Borussia Dortmund. He is a flexible player capable to play in a variety of positions in defence who we believe has tremendous potential."

On 10 July 2013, Papastathopoulos made his debut for Dortmund in a pre-season friendly away to Swiss club Basel at St. Jakob-Park, along with fellow BVB debutants (and future Arsenal teammates) Pierre-Emerick Aubameyang and Henrikh Mkhitaryan. On 27 July, he won his first title with the club after entering the match as a substitute in a 4–2 win over Bayern Munich for the 2013 DFL-Supercup. On 1 November 2013, he scored his debut goal for Dortmund in a win over VfB Stuttgart in the Bundesliga, 6–1.

Papastathopoulos' strong first year with Dortmund was rewarded with his selection to the best XI of the 2013–14 Bundesliga campaign. The selection was organised in a worldwide fan vote by the governing body of the Bundesliga through its official website. The description of his play following his nomination was, "The definition of defense falls on him. The Greek stopper took advantage of the opportunities given to him by the absence of Neven Subotić and Mats Hummels. Stable, with leadership characteristics and tendency to win the ball without making easily a mistake."

In November 2014, Papastathopoulos was out of action for two weeks diagnosed with a broken fibula. He suffered the injury to his right leg in Dortmund's 1–0 win over Borussia Mönchengladbach, a result that ended a five-match Bundesliga losing streak for the club. After an early recovery, he was deemed fit for BVB's Champions League match against Arsenal on 26 November. On 3 January 2015, football news website Goal.com assessed statistics to determine which players maintained the highest tackle success rate in the first half of the 2014–15 season across Europe's top five leagues; Papastathopoulos finished joint-third, alongside Hamburger SV's Matthias Ostrzolek, having won 92.59 per cent of all tackles.

In the summer of 2015, Papastathopoulos was linked with moves to various English Premier League clubs as Dortmund prepared for a new start following long-time manager Jürgen Klopp's departure. Dortmund Sporting Director Michael Zorc, however, said Papastathopoulos would still have a part to play for BVB in new manager Thomas Tuchel's debut season with the club. On 26 October 2015, Papastathopoulos extended his contract with Borussia Dortmund until 2019.

"The defensive work that Sokratis puts in is just unbelievable."

— German defender Mats Hummels on Papastathopoulos

After the extension, Zorc said, "We are very pleased that we have been able to sign with Sokratis, another top performer, on a long term." During Tuchel's tenure, Papastathopoulos was promoted to be partner-in-chief to Mats Hummels over Neven Subotic.

On 19 December 2015, Papastathopoulos scored his first goal in the 2015–16 Bundesliga in an eventual 2–1 away loss to 1. FC Köln, giving his club the lead in the first-half from a header from a corner. On 30 January 2016, in a league game against Ingolstadt 04, Papastathopoulos reached his 100th Bundesliga appearance with Dortmund. On 22 February 2016, Papastathopoulos missed the second leg of the UEFA Europa League round-of-32 tie against FC Porto and the Bundesliga clash with Bayern Munich due to an adductor injury, as tests confirmed that the 27-year-old would be out for up to three weeks. The Greek centre back picked up the injury during Dortmund's 1–0 win against Bayer Leverkusen and was replaced 13 minutes from time at the BayArena. On 21 May 2016, Papastathopoulos featured in his third DFB-Pokal final in a row, putting in a tremendous performance despite a missed penalty, but he did not succeed in winning the DFB-Pokal for first time in his career.

He started the 2016–17 season as the undisputed leader in BVB defence. On 15 September 2016, he netted the second goal in an away crashing 6–0 against Legia Warsaw on a Group UEFA Champions League match. On 4 January 2017, the German magazine "kicker" listed the Greek international as one of the best players in the German Bundesliga. The magazine paid a tribute to the best players currently playing in the German Bundesliga, separating them out into different categories. In the first category (World Class) no defenders were listed, however, Papastathopoulos was one of three defenders listed in the second category, International Class. The other two defenders included Mats Hummels of Bayern Munich and Jonathan Tah of Bayer Leverkusen.

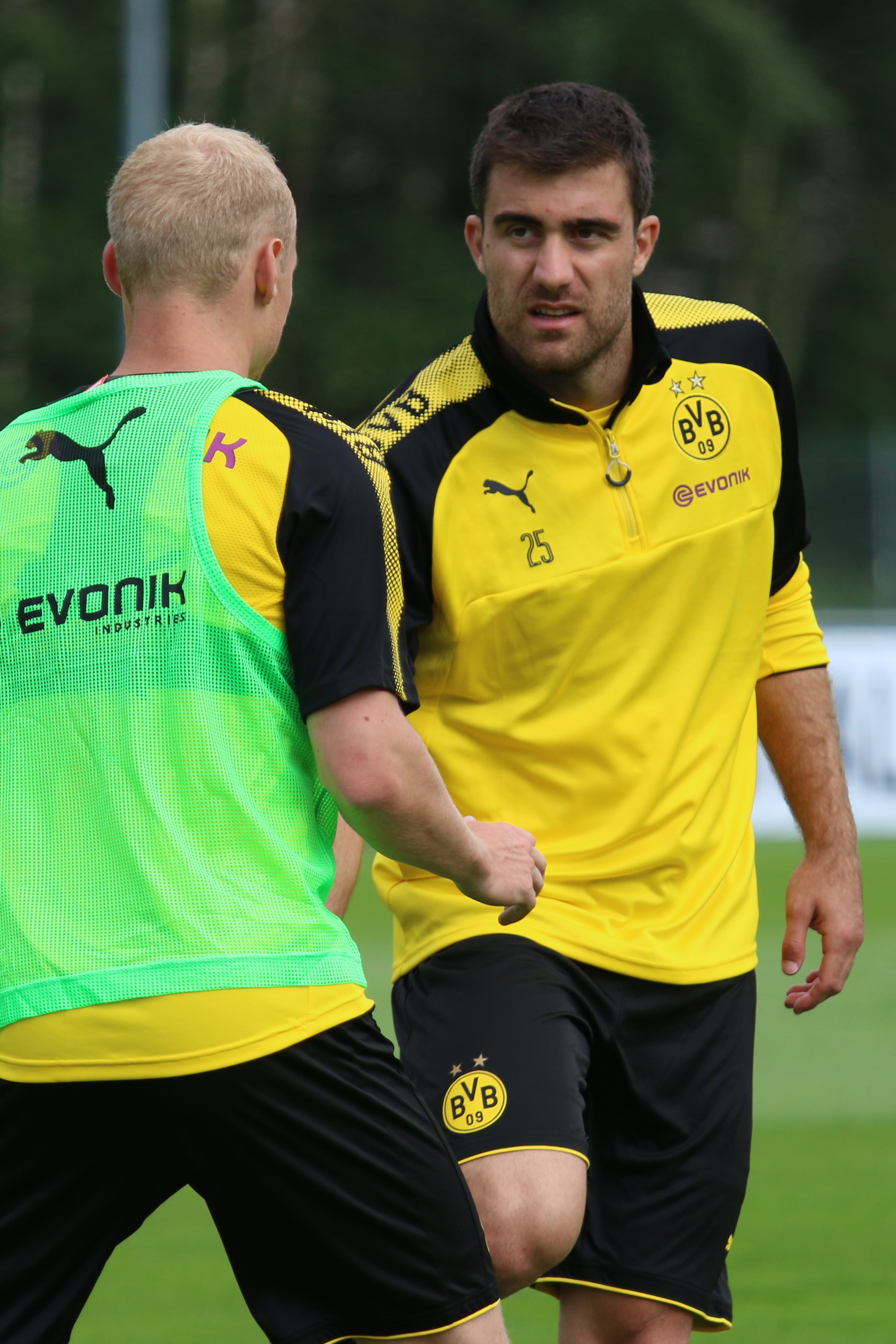
Papastathopoulos (right) training with Borussia Dortmund in 2017

On 8 February 2017, in a DFB-Pokal home win on penalties' game against Hertha Berlin, Papastathopoulos' two quickfire (in a minute) bookings for dissent saw Dortmund finish extra time with 10 men before Fabian Lustenberger, Vladimír Darida and Salomon Kalou all missed from the spot, rendering Christian Pulisic's miss irrelevant. On 25 February 2017, Dortmund made three changes from last weekend's 3–0 win over VfL Wolfsburg and it was two of those, Papastathopoulos and Raphaël Guerreiro, who combined to open the scoring in the 13th minute in a 3–0 away win against SC Freiburg. Papastathopoulos looked to be offside as Guerreiro swung in a free-kick from the right, which the Greece defender met with a header planted inside the right-hand post. On 16 April 2017, Papastathopoulos was the one who had a quick reaction to an Eintracht Frankfurt equalising, by scoring a goal after Sven Bender's assist giving a lead to the score in his team in a final 3–1 home win. On 26 April 2017, helped Borussia Dortmund to a 3–2 win over Bayern Munich and their fourth consecutive DFB-Pokal final. On 20 May 2017, Papastathopoulos reached 100 appearances with Dortmund in Bundesliga in a home game against Werder Bremen and secured automatic qualification to the group stage of next season's UEFA Champions League. On 27 May 2017, in his fourth DFB-Pokal final in a row, Borussia Dortmund claimed a first DFB-Pokal win since 2012 as Pierre-Emerick Aubameyang's penalty defeated Eintracht Frankfurt 2–1.

On 5 August 2017, as the captain of the club, he lost the 2017 DFL-Supercup on penalties' game against Bayern Munich. On 17 September 2017, he scored at the end of the first half against 1. FC Köln, giving a lead of two goals in his club. It was his first goal for the 2017–18 season and was secured with the use of VAR (Video Assistant Referee) method. On 14 October 2017, Borussia Dortmund's unbeaten start to the season was ended by RB Leipzig's 3–2 away win, as the Greek defender initially in trying to push the ball away helped Leipzig winger Yussuf Poulsen to score, while at the beginning of second half, was sent off for a foul in the box and Jean-Kévin Augustin scored the penalty. On 17 October 2017, after losing its UEFA Champions League opening games in Group H to Tottenham Hotspur and Real Madrid, Dortmund needed a win to kick-start its campaign in Europe's premier club competition, but they succeeded only to seal an away draw against Cypriot champions APOEL, as the Greek defender equalised with a header to Mario Götze's cross. On 4 November 2017, in the derby against rivals Bayern Munich he suffered a leg injury, during the first half, and was substituted by Jeremy Toljan, and two weeks later in an away game against VfB Stuttgart has received a heavy blow and replaced at the end of the first half from Dan-Axel Zagadou.

=== Arsenal ===
On 2 July 2018, Arsenal announced that Papastathopoulos had agreed a long-term contract with the club for a reported fee £17.6 million and would wear the number 5 shirt. On 12 August 2018, he made his official debut with the club as a starter at Emirates Stadium, in a 2–0 loss against champions Manchester City. On 4 October 2018, Papastathopoulos scored his first goal for the club, setting the Gunners on their way to a comfortable 3–0 victory over Qarabag in the 2018–19 UEFA Europa League group stage: after just four minutes of play in Baku, the centre-back was left unmarked inside the opposing penalty area, deflecting the ball home after an initial header fell into his path. Papastathopoulos was named to the UEFA Europa League Team of the Week.

On 15 October 2018, Papastathopoulos was forced off during Greece's 2–0 defeat to Finland and was believed to have sprained his ankle. Papastathopoulos was at the heart of Unai Emery's defence since the Spaniard took over the reins in the summer and a fixture in a winning run of nine matches. On 21 February 2019, he netted his second goal as an Arsenal player, taking advantage of a missed punch from BATE Borisov's goalie Denis Scherbitskiy to head the ball into an empty net following a corner kick from Granit Xhaka, to seal a 3–0 home win for Arsenal and send them through to the Round of 32 in the 2018–19 UEFA Europa League.

On 12 April 2019, Papastathopoulos was named to the UEFA Europa League's 'Team of the week' after playing a vital role in Arsenal's 2–0 win over Napoli in the first leg of the quarter-finals. He was one of four Arsenal players selected along with Petr Čech, Ainsley Maitland-Niles, and Aaron Ramsey. On 24 April 2019, Papastathopoulos scored his maiden goal in the English Premier League via a close-range header from a corner kick, but Arsenal slipped to a 3–1 defeat against Wolverhampton Wanderers. On 29 May 2019, he started in the 2019 UEFA Europa League Final against Chelsea which Arsenal lost 4–1. This was the first time Arsenal had conceded four goals in a European match since a 5–1 loss to Bayern Munich in March 2017.

On 27 October 2019, Papastathopoulos – marking his 50th appearance – scored his first goal of the season, after Crystal Palace failed to clear Nicolas Pépé's corner in a 2–2 draw at home. On 1 January 2020, he scored a close-range finish to seal a 2–0 win over Manchester United, securing Mikel Arteta his first victory in charge of the Gunners. He was named Sky Sports Man of the match. On 2 March 2020, he scored with a volley to give Arsenal the lead in a 2–0 away win against Portsmouth, helping Arsenal to be the first team in the FA Cup quarter-finals. On 1 August 2020, Papastathopoulos played as a late substitute in the 2020 FA Cup Final against Chelsea, as Arsenal won the trophy for the 14th time.

Papastathopoulos and Mesut Özil were notably excluded from Arsenal's Premier League and Europa League squads for 2020–21, leaving them only eligible for one League Cup game between October and January.

On 20 January 2021, Arsenal announced that Papastathopoulos would be leaving the club after his contract was cancelled "by mutual consent."

=== Olympiacos ===
On 25 January 2021, Papastathopoulos joined Greek side Olympiacos on a two-and-a-half-year contract. On 21 April 2021, he scored his first goal with the club, in a 1–0 home win game against Asteras Tripolis.

=== Real Betis and retirement ===
On 26 October 2023, Papastathopoulos signed a one-year deal with Spanish La Liga club Real Betis.

On 19 May 2024, Papastathopoulos announced that he would retire from professional football at the end of the season. He played his last professional game against Real Madrid on 25 May in a 0–0 draw.

== International career ==
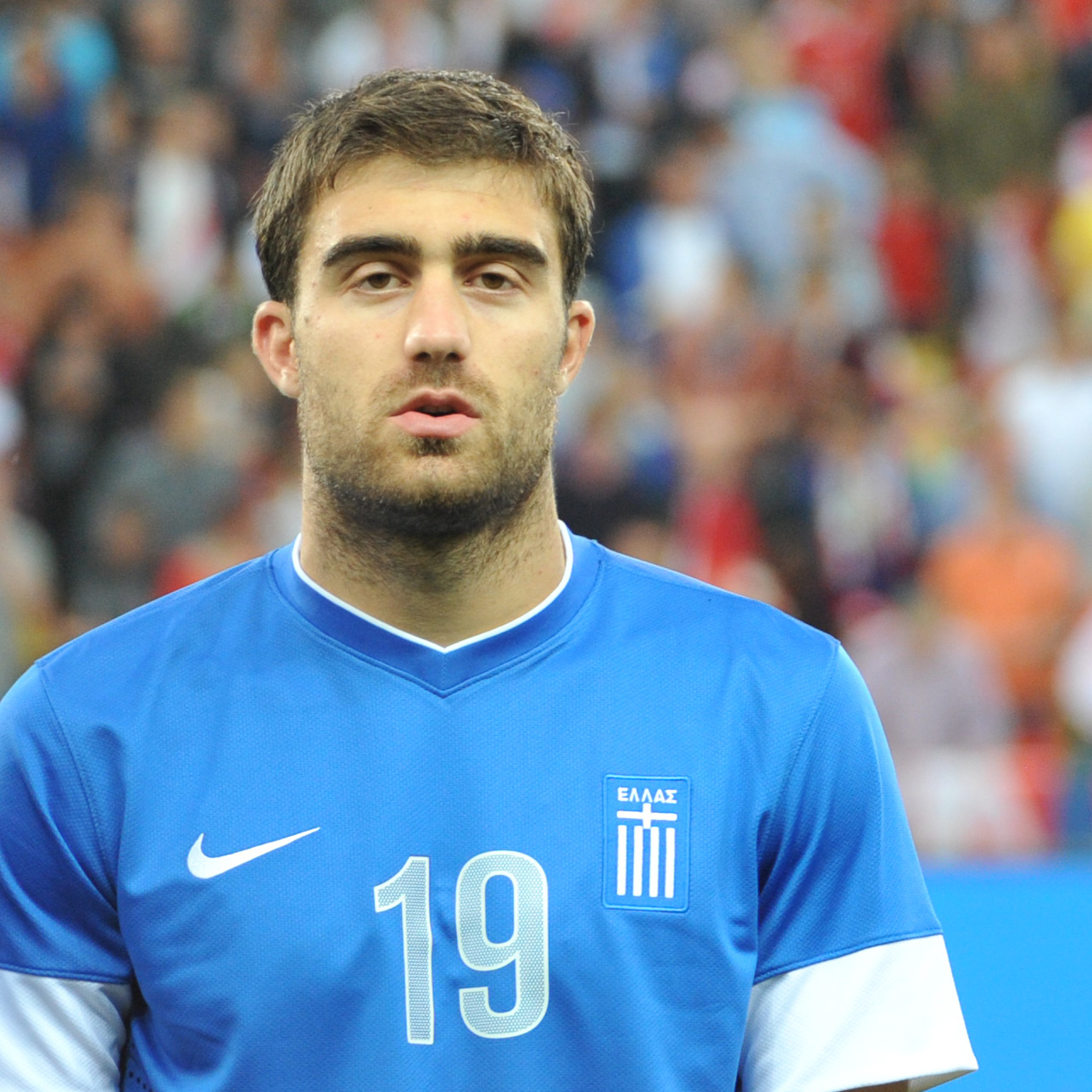
Papastathopoulos with Greece in 2013

Papastathopoulos was called up for the Greek senior team on 1 February 2008 and made his debut on 5 February 2008 in the 1–0 friendly victory against the Czech Republic. The Greece squad for UEFA Euro 2008 was announced by Otto Rehhagel on 27 May 2008, and Papastathopoulos was the unfortunate player to be cut from the provisional squad of 24 to the final 23-man selection.

Papastathopoulos became the first player to be sent off at UEFA Euro 2012 during the opening game of the tournament against co-hosts Poland after receiving two yellow cards, following what pundits decried as two poor decisions by referee Carlos Velasco Carballo.

In June 2014, Papastathopoulos was named to the Greece national team for the 2014 FIFA World Cup. He started in each of the team's group matches, helping them to a clean sheet against Japan. In the round of 16, Papastathopoulos scored his first international goal, equalising in second half stoppage time against Costa Rica. However, the Greeks were eventually defeated 5–3 in a penalty shoot-out by the Central American champions.

On 11 June 2019, following the loss to Armenia at the Olympic Stadium, Papastathopoulos called for immediate changes to be made to the Greece national squad set-up, and he allegedly requested for Angelos Anastasiadis to be removed from his role of head coach when speaking to EPO president, Evangelos Grammenos.

== Personal life ==
Papastathopoulos was born in Kalamata, Peloponnese. He married Xanthippi Stamoulaki in 2014. Together they have three children.

== Career statistics ==
=== Club ===
Appearances and goals by club, season and competition
Club	Season	League			National cup (Note: Includes Greek Cup, Coppa Italia, DFB-Pokal, FA Cup, Copa del Rey)		Europe		Other		Total	
Club	Season	Division	Apps	Goals	Apps	Goals	Apps	Goals	Apps	Goals	Apps	Goals
AEK Athens	2005–06	Alpha Ethniki	0	0	2	1	0	0	—		2	1
AEK Athens	2006–07	Super League Greece	14	0	1	0	4 (Note: Three appearances in UEFA Champions League, one appearance in UEFA Cup)	0	—		19	0
AEK Athens	2007–08	Super League Greece	28	1	1	0	8 (Note: One appearance in UEFA Champions League, seven appearances in UEFA Cup)	0	—		37	1
AEK Athens	Total		42	1	4	1	12	0	0	0	58	2
Niki Volos (loan)	2005–06	Beta Ethniki	11	0	0	0	—		—		11	0
Genoa	2008–09	Serie A	21	2	2	0	—		—		23	2
Genoa	2009–10	Serie A	30	0	1	0	5	0	—		36	0
Genoa	Total		51	2	3	0	5	0	0	0	59	2
A.C. Milan	2010–11	Serie A	5	0	2	0	0	0	—		7	0
Werder Bremen (loan)	2011–12	Bundesliga	30	1	1	0	0	0	—		31	1
Werder Bremen	2012–13	Bundesliga	29	1	1	0	0	0	—		30	1
Werder Bremen	Total		59	2	2	0	0	0	0	0	61	2
Borussia Dortmund	2013–14	Bundesliga	28	1	5	0	8 (Note: Appearances in UEFA Champions League)	0	1 (Note: Appearance in DFL-Supercup)	0	42	1
Borussia Dortmund	2014–15	Bundesliga	21	1	4	0	6	1	1	0	32	2
Borussia Dortmund	2015–16	Bundesliga	25	1	5	0	10 (Note: Appearances in UEFA Europa League)	0	0	0	40	1
Borussia Dortmund	2016–17	Bundesliga	26	2	5	0	9	1	1	0	41	3
Borussia Dortmund	2017–18	Bundesliga	30	2	3	0	9 (Note: Five appearances and one goal in UEFA Champions League, four appearances in UEFA Europa League)	1	1	0	43	3
Borussia Dortmund	Total		130	7	22	0	42	3	4	0	198	10
Arsenal	2018–19	Premier League	25	1	2	0	12	2	1 (Note: Appearance in EFL Cup)	0	40	3
Arsenal	2019–20	Premier League	19	2	5	1	5	0	0	0	29	3
Arsenal	2020–21	Premier League	0	0	0	0	0	0	0	0	0	0
Arsenal	Total		44	3	7	1	17	2	1	0	69	6
Olympiacos	2020–21	Super League Greece	14	1	5	0	4	0	—		23	1
Olympiacos	2021–22	Super League Greece	25	1	3	0	11 (Note: One appearance in UEFA Champions League, ten appearances in UEFA Europa League)	0	—		39	1
Olympiacos	2022–23	Super League Greece	27	2	2	0	3 (Note: One appearance in UEFA Champions League, two appearances in UEFA Europa League)	0	—		32	2
Olympiacos	Total		66	4	10	0	18	0	0	0	94	4
Real Betis	2023–24	La Liga	15	0	1	0	0	0	—		16	0
Career total			423	19	51	2	94	5	5	0	575	26

=== International ===
Appearances and goals by national team and year
National team	Year	Apps	Goals
Greece	2008	5	0
Greece	2009	5	0
Greece	2010	8	0
Greece	2011	7	0
Greece	2012	12	0
Greece	2013	9	0
Greece	2014	8	1
Greece	2015	8	1
Greece	2016	9	0
Greece	2017	7	1
Greece	2018	7	0
Greece	2019	5	0
Total		90	3

Greece score listed first, score column indicates score after each Papastathopoulos goal.

List of international goals scored by Sokratis Papastathopoulos
No.	Date	Venue	Opponent	Score	Result	Competition
1	29 June 2014	Arena Pernambuco, Recife, Brazil	Costa Rica	1–1	1–1	2014 FIFA World Cup
2	13 June 2015	Tórsvøllur, Tórshavn, Faroe Islands	Faroe Islands	1–2	1–2	UEFA Euro 2016 qualifying
3	9 November 2017	Stadion Maksimir, Zagreb, Croatia	Croatia	1–2	1–4	2018 FIFA World Cup qualification

== Honours ==
AC Milan

- Serie A: 2010–11

Borussia Dortmund

- DFB-Pokal: 2016–17; runner-up: 2013–14, 2014–15, 2015–16
- DFL-Supercup: 2013, 2014

Arsenal

- FA Cup: 2019–20
- UEFA Europa League runner-up: 2018–19

Olympiacos

- Super League Greece: 2020–21, 2021–22
- Greek Football Cup runner-up: 2020–21

Greece U19

- UEFA European Under-19 Championship runner-up: 2007

Individual

- Super League Greece Young Player of the Season: 2007–08
- Bundesliga Team of the Year: 2013–14
- Bundesliga Team of the Half-Season: 2016–17
- Bundesliga Defender of the Half-Season: 2016–17
- Best Greek Player playing Abroad: 2016–17, 2018–19
