= Kostas Katsouranis =

Greek footballer (born 1979)

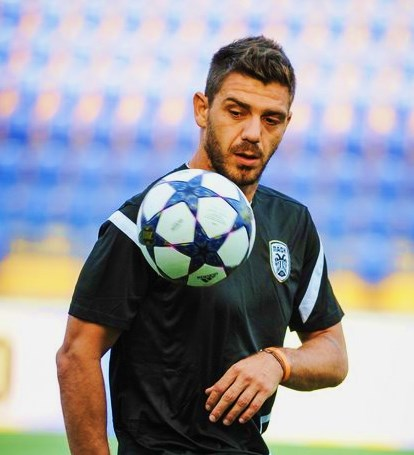
- Katsouranis with PAOK in 2013

Personal information
- Full name: Konstantinos Katsouranis
- Date of birth: 21 June 1979 (age 47)
- Place of birth: Patras, Greece
- Height: 1.83 m (6 ft 0 in)
- Positions: Midfielder; defender

Youth career
- –1994: Panachaikos Neo Souli
- 1994–1996: Doxa Chalandritsa

Senior career*
Years	Team	Apps	(Gls)
1996–2002	Panachaiki	123	(14)
2002–2006	AEK Athens	110	(29)
2006–2009	Benfica	80	(10)
2009–2012	Panathinaikos	88	(18)
2012–2014	PAOK	47	(6)
2014	Pune City	14	(4)
2014–2015	Atromitos	22	(3)
2015	Heidelberg United	0	(0)
Total		484	(85)

International career
2000–2002	Greece U21	22	(1)
2003–2015	Greece	116	(10)
Medal record
Men's football
Representing Greece
UEFA European Championship
Winner	2004
- * Club domestic league appearances and goals

Kostas Katsouranis (Greek: Κώστας Κατσουράνης; born 21 June 1979) is a Greek former professional footballer. A versatile midfielder, who won the Super League Greek Footballer of the Year Award in 2005 and 2013, as well as the Cosme Damião Award for Footballer of the Year in 2008.

Katsouranis qualified with Greece for international play between 2002 and 2015. They won the UEFA Euro 2004, and played in the UEFA Euro 2008, 2010 FIFA World Cup, UEFA Euro 2012 and 2014 FIFA World Cup tournaments. With 116 appearances, he is a member of a close club of players who had more than 100 caps in the history of Greece.

== Club career ==
=== Panachaiki ===
Katsouranis was not even 17 years old when he debuted in 1996 for the Patras-based club Panachaiki. In his first season, Panachaiki reached the Greek Cup semi-finals, tying an all-time best result in the competition. In the following season, Katsouranis made three appearances in the Intertoto Cup, scoring one goal as Panachaiki finished fourth out of five in their group. He spent six seasons in Patras and by the third, he was a regular.

In the summer of 2002, when his contract with Panachaiki expired, Katsouranis opened negotiations with Panathinaikos. However the manager Fernando Santos, decided to sign Portuguese Carlos Chaínho, a player he knew when at Porto. Katsouranis was then approached by Olympiacos. The talks with the vice-president of the club, Giorgos Louvaris, seemed final, but Louvaris asked Katsouranis to wait until the president, Sokratis Kokkalis, returned from a business trip to the United States for the final negotiations. However, the boss of AEK Athens Chrarilaos Psomiadis took advantage of the situation and convinced the Katsouranis to sign a three-year contract with AEK Athens.

=== AEK Athens ===
Coming off the bench and making an impressive debut for the club, Katsouranis immediately became an integral part of the club. His continuing progress in the top-level rapidly made him one of the team's best players with great performances, both domestically and internationally. He was used mainly as a central midfielder but also can be used in the wings. In his first season, alongside his teammate in the national team, Thodoris Zagorakis he formed an amazing "duo" in the midfield of AEK. In fact, he had an excellent performance in the UEFA Champions League group stage matches of that season and also scored a historic goal against Real Madrid at the Santiago Bernabéu Stadium. He also scored the winning goal against Olympiacos in Rizoupoli Stadium at the stoppage time.

In the summer of 2004, Katsouranis remained at AEK, despite several offers, having agreed a new three-year contract, while most of his teammates from the previous campaign had acted on their frustration and left. In the fevered atmosphere that saw AEK's gates quadruple as fans flocked to support the club under new president and former teammate, Demis Nikolaidis, Katsouranis adopted a special place in supporters' hearts. That season was one of greatest seasons of Katsouranis with the club, as under Fernando Santos he scored 10 times in 28 appearances despite playing in the midfield, leading the club for the title race, while he was voted as the best Greek footballer of the championship. AEK managed to finish third despite the big cut in the team's budget. Werder Bremen expressed strong interest for the Greek international, but both Katsouranis and Nikolaidis decided to reject the offer.

Despite radical changes to the squad in the first season under the management of Nikolaidis, the supporters and staff came together and created an electrified atmosphere at every home match of AEK. Led by captain Katsouranis, the team responded with great performances, only missing the championship on the final day of the campaign. Everyone connected with the club was united for one purpose: the team, said Katsouranis. First we had to make the club financially healthy, and then to make sure everything was well organised. In the following season, Katsouranis was among the key players of the club that achieved a second-place finish in the league, which brought them to the UEFA Champions League.

=== Benfica ===
At the end of the season, Santos left the club and Katsouranis wanted to play to a bigger club and further his career abroad. The Portuguese manager was signed by Benfica and indicated to the management the acquisition of Katsouranis. Thus on Katsouranis signed a four-year contract for the Portuguese club in a transfer that cost €2.3 million plus the proceeds of friendly match in Athens between the two clubs. Apart from Santos, Katsouranis was also reunited with his teammate at Greece, Giorgos Karagounis. When he arrived in June, he said "Even if Fernando Santos or Karagounis were not here, I still would have joined. Benfica to me is one of Europe's top clubs and they proved that in the UEFA Champions League. I am here to achieve that same objective and joining Benfica can also help my international career." In his first Clássico against Porto, he followed on to score for Benfica with a header following a corner kick, the second goal he has scored for Benfica in the league in just a few matches. Katsouranis quickly became a key player for Benfica, scoring some important goals and also captaining the team on a few occasions. He proved to be one of the most important imports into the 2006–07 Portuguese Liga, playing in 29 league matches and scoring six goals.

Despite interest from Valencia, Werder Bremen, Tottenham, and Juventus, Benfica refused to sell the player, despite Juventus willing to trade Tiago for the Greek international. Benfica were reluctant to sell and, on 14 September 2007, Katsouranis agreed to a contract extension with Benfica for another two years. During his last season there, he was given a chance to captain the side, which was a huge honour. On 2 March 2009, Katsouranis was named "Benfica Player of the Year".

=== Panathinaikos ===
Katsouranis returned to Greece and signed a four-year contract with Panathinaikos, on 1 July 2009 on a fee of €3.5 million. He has stated that it's the team he supported since childhood. He scored his first goal against Sparta Prague for the Champions League. He scored his first league goal against Skoda Xanthi on the 2nd matchday of the 2009–10 season. Katsouranis scoring abilities were a key part of Panathinaikos' good run during the first half of the season, as the defensive midfielder scored 8 goals in just half a season. In his first season with Panathinaikos, he managed to win the domestic double with the 2009–10 Greek Cup final against Aris Thessaloniki. Katsouranis was the team's second top scorer behind Djibril Cissé with eight goals in the Super League Greece triumph.

In October 2012, Panathinaikos president Giannis Alafouzos terminated his contract with the club, with Katsouranis paying the price for team's bad performances at the start of the 2012–13 season. Katsouranis has been serving a six-match suspension for verbally abusing a referee in a Greek Super League match in August. Alafouzos reportedly told the rest of the squad that the player was "history" at Panathinaikos, whilst also expressing his displeasure about "two or three other(s)", without going into specifics. Katsouranis left Panathinaikos with rumours for a lot of problems with foreign players and the accusation of controlling the changing rooms. Katsouranis never replied to a series of miseries which were released and related to him.

=== PAOK ===
On 11 December 2012 he agreed with PAOK, not only because he wanted to prove that it can be helpful to club plans to become a champion, but also because he wanted to make it clear that working with people who trust him and with a serious administration, he will never be a problem for those who want to hide in the seatbacks and ask severe criticism. He succeeded in both. In fact few people know that he went to PAOK without the blessing of his former manager Georgios Donis and needed only a few weeks to become one of his favourites. Katsouranis would get €700,000 for a year and a half, plus any bonuses. It formed part of the policy of the new PAOK owner, Ivan Savvidis, who insisted on the acquisition of Greek internationals in order to boost both the strength of the roster and the prestige of the club.

He made his debut with his new club on 6 January 2013 against Panthrakikos. On 24 January, he scored his first goal with PAOK in the cup against Kallithea. On 3 March 2013 Katsouranis scored his first goal in the Greek Super League with PAOK in a 4–2 win against Panionios. He formed a strong partnership with Gordon Schildenfeld in the defence reducing to a great extent the goals which PAOK conceded. On 27 August 2013 Katsouranis scored against Schalke 04 in the Champions League playoff in a 2–3 loss.

In the following season he was named vice-captain of the club behind Dimitris Salpingidis. He believed that PAOK needed time and patience to identify changes to a club that really tries to make a break with problematic situations and detach from stereotypical stories. He said, "What I see is that there is a plan. The fact that acquires so many Greek international footballers, shows in itself that is aiming a target. The challenge is to remain faithful to it and not skewed along the way. I have lived the same with AEK in summer of 2004. Then was not given so much money to the extent that PAOK does by acquiring reputable players. Along the way in AEK made other things than those envisaged in the initial plan leading the team to tabefaction. This should avoid PAOK. To remain faithful to the plan is the key not to lose the opportunity to build something big." On 27 February 2014, he was sent off in the 69th minute in a 3–0 UEFA Europa League loss against Benfica, and he received a standing ovation from the Benfica fans as he exited the field in recognition for the seasons he spent with Benfica.

On 16 April 2014, in an episodic semi-final game for the cup, where fans of both Olympiacos and PAOK put the mental in monumental as they greeted their heroes with a ring of fire, he had a key role in helping PAOK eventually went through on away goals after a 1–0 win following a 2–1 defeat in the first leg in Athens. It was a tremendous game as the fans then use the pitch as a giant ashtray by throwing their flares onto the grass and set fire to one of the dug outs. Five minutes before the end of the game for the sake of a ball he falling out with his team player in Greece, Giannis Maniatis leading to his drop-off from the game.

=== Pune City ===
In September he signed a contract with Pune City, the team of Bruno Cirillo and David Trezeguet coached by the Italian coach Franco Colomba. Speaking on Kostas' arrival, Gaurav Modwel, CEO, FC Pune City said, "We would like to extend our heartiest welcome to Kostas. Apart from being a great player, he is an amazing human being his passion for football, down to earth personality and desire to learn and share sets him apart. His vast experience as a midfielder shall bring great balance to the FC Pune City team."

Katsouranis became the first player and captain of this year's FIFA World Cup to feature in the ISL. He played the first mach with the new club against Delhi Dynamos who contained Alessandro Del Piero in an away draw which ended 0–0. In a match against FC Goa, Katsouranis scored his first goal for the club and put in a man of the match performance in a 2–0 home win. Kostas made a very impressive play along with the Dutchman John Goossens and scored a beautiful goal in the away match in Kolkata against Atlético de Kolkata with the final result of 1–3 in favour of Katsouranis's club. This goal was awarded as the goal of the ISL's first season.

In its inaugural season, the Indian football league featured several internationally experienced players. Katsouranis, scored four goals in the season emerging as the club's top scorer and in the sixth place of the league’s goalscorers, four goals behind the top scorer, Elano.

=== Atromitos ===
On 26 December 2014, he signed a six-month contract with Atromitos with an option to extend it by one year. Undoubtedly he was the most impressive transfer of this winter's window, the signing of former Greece skipper. "I will give it all for Atromitos", stated Katsouranis who in the first half of the season plied his trade in India, with remarkable success in that up and coming mini-league that lasts only a few months. The 35-year-old has made no secret of his aspiration to return to the national team, too, as former Greece manager Claudio Ranieri had not called him up for any of the five matches Greece played after the 2014 World Cup. On 3 January 2015, he played the first match with the new club at home against AEL Kalloni. He signed for Atromitos in a six-month deal with an option for one year more, however, the Athens club decided not to keep Katsouranis in their squad ahead of next season.

=== Heidelberg United ===
On 15 September 2015, Katsouranis signed with NPL Victoria club Heidelberg United on a one-match contract, with the option to extend it should they win their following FFA Cup match. Heidelberg United coach George Katsakis summed it up by commenting: "When you start to put things into perspective, he played for S.L. Benfica, all over the world, to come to the Olympic Village for Heidelberg, it's amazing."

"Katsouranis is one of the best players I ever trained in my professional career"

— Fernando Santos about Katsouranis.

=== Retirement ===
On 29 September 2015, Katsouranis officially announced his retirement from professional football.

In August 2016, after his retirement from professional football, has appointed as a Technical Director of Football League club Panachaiki. On 28 November 2018, he resigned from the position. From 2016 to 2018, he was giving Master Classes of Football at the Institute of Vocational Training (ΙΕΚ) “ΑΚΜΗ”, Athens (Greece) and "ΙΠΠΟΚΡΑΤΕΙΟΣ", Athens (Greece)

On 14 November 2017, Katsouranis was appointed as Ambassador of the United Nations. The announcement stated: "The European Champion and Technical Director of Panachaiki F.C. Kostas Katsouranis was delighted to participate in the information campaign on the 17 UN Sustainable Development Goals. Sport and Athletes around the world play a very important role in achieving the Goals, Development, Peace and Human Rights. We like to thank Kostas Katsouranis for his participation and his substantial contribution to the success of their efforts."

From April 2021 to June 2021 (about 2.5 months), he was the sporting director of Greek club Niki Volos.

In the TV season 2018/19 he participated as a Commentator in the Sports TV show Total Football on the OPEN TV Greek channel. During the 2021/22 season he started working as a commentator and analyst of the Greek Super League 1matches, in the show of the YouTube channel "Betarades".

== International career ==
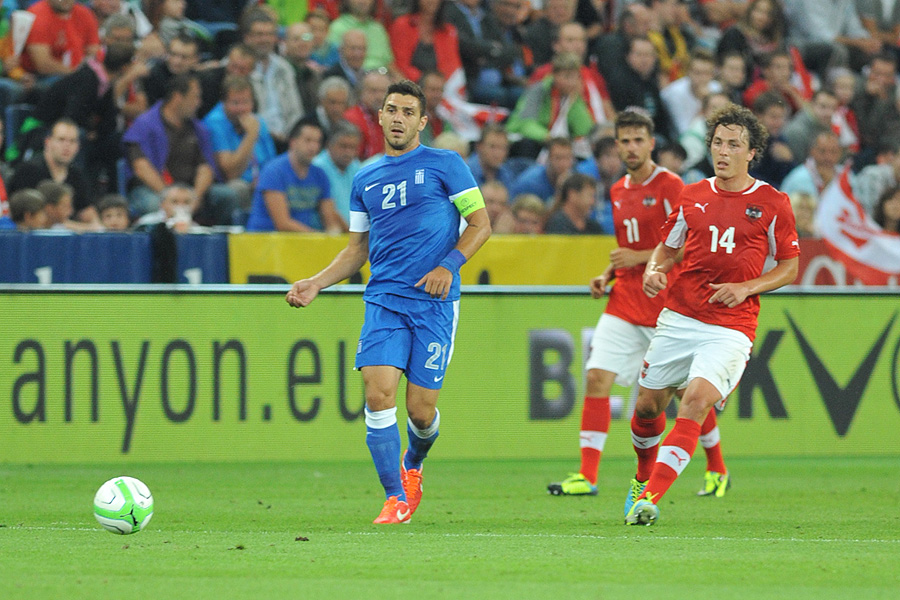
Katsouranis with Greece in 2013

Katsouranis made his international debut for Greece on 20 August 2003 against Sweden and scored his first goal against Kazakhstan in a 2006 FIFA World Cup qualifier. Katsouranis was one of the key factors in Greece's triumph at UEFA Euro 2004, beating Portugal in his own "home" (Benfica's Estádio da Luz) and, following Greece's success at the tournament, was on the starting XI after coming off the bench for the opening game of the tournament. He was an important part of a three-man midfield that also included Theodoros Zagorakis and Angelos Basinas. It was in Portugal that Katsouranis really made a name for himself, delivering consistent performances culminating with that famous final in Lisbon. Lifting the Henri Delaunay trophy represents the pinnacle of a national-team career.

Katsouranis was a regular for Greece in their unsuccessful 2006 FIFA World Cup qualification campaign. He believes that the worse moment of the Greece national team was the elimination from the 2006 World Cup, realizing his own percentage in this unsuccessful tournament in a game against Albania national football team.

Katsouranis became one of Greece's impact players in their UEFA Euro 2008 qualifiers when he helped Greece consecutively qualify for the finals to defend their crown. Their UEFA Euro 2008 campaign resulted in poor fashion as Greece failed to pick up a point. Katsouranis has captained Greece on several occasions and was selected for his country in the 2010 FIFA World Cup qualification. Together with Angelos Charisteas, Giourkas Seitaridis, Georgios Karagounis, Kostas Chalkias who all participated in Greece's UEFA Euro 2004 triumph, he led Greece to its first win World Cup against Nigeria, 2–1.

On 17 October 2012, Katsouranis reached a milestone on the international level as he made his 100th appearance in a Greece shirt. A 1–0 win over Slovakia in Bratislava certainly stole the headlines, but Katsouranis became the fourth Greece player to make a century of appearances for Greece just days after teammate Giorgos Karagounis set the sport record for all-over appearances.

Katsouranis's exceptional leader characteristics along with experience and the huge influence on the pitch saw him stand-in as captain for Greece at the 2014 FIFA World Cup, with the team's regular captain, the veteran Karagounis, restricted to substitute appearances at the age of 37. On 19 June 2014, Katsouranis became the first Greek player in World Cup history to be shown a red card. He was dismissed in the 38th minute of the group match against Japan for committing two bookable offences.

After the draw for UEFA Euro 2016, Katsouranis stated that he was confident of reaching the finals due to a lack of "powerhouses" in their qualifying group. Katsouranis believes Greece face a tricky task to reach the tournament, which will be held in France, but believes the side are well prepared for the challenge. "It's a good draw for us but we have to prove that on the pitch as well," he said. "I believe we have what it takes to be among the final 24 teams. There are no powerhouses in our group, but there are dangerous rivals." However, Greece would finish bottom of their qualifying group, winning just once, on the final matchday.

== Style of play ==
Katsouranis could play in various positions, as a result of the combination of his technique, speed and strength. He has been described as "a reasonable goal threat despite being notionally a midfielder". A technically gifted passer, Katsouranis was also strong in aerial duels and noted for his defensive positioning. Although primarily deployed in a deep-lying midfield role, he possessed strong attacking instincts and frequently made late runs into the penalty area. Throughout his club career, and at times with the Greece national team, he demonstrated an eye for goal, scoring a variety of important goals. His ability to contribute offensively without neglecting his defensive responsibilities led to him being regarded as a complete box-to-box midfielder.

== Career statistics ==
=== Club ===
Appearances and goals by club, season and competition
Club	Season	League			Cup		League Cup		Europe		Total	
Club	Season	Division	Apps	Goals	Apps	Goals	Apps	Goals	Apps	Goals	Apps	Goals
Panachaiki	1996–97	Super League Greece	14	2	2	1	—	—	3	1	19	4
Panachaiki	1997–98	Super League Greece	4	1	—	—	—	—	0	0	4	1
Panachaiki	1998–99	Super League Greece	28	1	4	2	—	—	0	0	32	3
Panachaiki	1999–00	Super League Greece	27	6	3	0	—	—	0	0	30	6
Panachaiki	2000–01	Super League Greece	25	2	1	0	—	—	0	0	26	2
Panachaiki	2001–02	Super League Greece	25	3	2	0	—	—	0	0	27	3
AEK Athens	2002–03	Super League Greece	26	6	2	1	—	—	8	2	36	9
AEK Athens	2003–04	Super League Greece	27	7	3	1	—	—	6	0	36	8
AEK Athens	2004–05	Super League Greece	28	10	2	1	—	—	8	2	38	13
AEK Athens	2005–06	Super League Greece	29	6	4	2	—	—	4	0	37	8
Benfica	2006–07	Primeira Liga	29	6	2	1	—	—	12	1	43	8
Benfica	2007–08	Primeira Liga	27	2	2	0	1	0	12	1	42	3
Benfica	2008–09	Primeira Liga	24	2	1	0	5	2	4	0	34	4
Panathinaikos	2009–10	Super League Greece	28	8	5	0	—	—	13	2	46	10
Panathinaikos	2010–11	Super League Greece	32	6	3	0	—	—	5	0	40	6
Panathinaikos	2011–12	Super League Greece	27	4	1	0	—	—	4	0	32	4
Panathinaikos	2012–13	Super League Greece	1	0	0	0	—	—	5	0	6	0
PAOK	2012–13	Super League Greece	18	4	6	1	—	—	—	—	24	5
PAOK	2013–14	Super League Greece	29	2	5	0	—	—	12	1	46	3
Pune City	2014	Indian Super League	14	4	—	—	—	—	—	—	14	4
Atromitos	2015	Super League Greece	22	3	1	0	—	—	—	—	23	3
Heidelberg United	2015	National Premier Leagues Victoria	—	—	1	0	—	—	—	—	1	0
Career total			484	85	50	10	6	2	96	10	636	107

=== International goals ===
Scores and results list Greece's goal tally first, score column indicates score after each Katsouranis goal.

List of international goals scored by Kostas Katsouranis
No.	Date	Venue	Opponent	Score	Result	Competition
1	17 November 2004	Karaiskakis Stadium, Piraeus, Greece	Kazakhstan		3–1	2006 FIFA World Cup qualification
2	7 October 2006	Karaiskakis Stadium, Piraeus, Greece	Norway		1–0	UEFA Euro 2008 qualifier
3	11 October 2006	Bilino Polje, Zenica, Bosnia and Herzegovina	Bosnia and Herzegovina		4–0	UEFA Euro 2008 qualifier
4	22 August 2007	Toumba Stadium, Thessaloniki, Greece	Spain		2–3	Friendly
5	6 February 2008	GSP Stadium, Nicosia, Cyprus	Finland		2–1	Friendly
6	19 May 2008	Pampeloponisiako Stadium, Patras, Greece	Cyprus		2–0	Friendly
7	11 October 2008	Karaiskakis Stadium, Piraeus, Greece	Moldova		3–0	2010 FIFA World Cup qualifier
8	25 May 2010	Stadion Schnabelholz, Altach, Austria	North Korea		2–2	Friendly
9	11 November 2011	Karaiskakis Stadium, Piraeus, Greece	Russia		1–1	Friendly
10	7 June 2014	Red Bull Arena, Harrison, United States	Bolivia		2–1	Friendly

== Honours ==
Benfica

- Taça da Liga: 2008–09

Panathinaikos

- Super League Greece: 2009–10
- Greek Cup: 2009–10

Greece

- European Championship: 2004

Individual

- Super League Greece Greek Footballer of the Year: 2004–05, 2012–13
- Cosme Damião Awards – Footballer of the Year: 2008
- Greek Best Young Player of the year: 2000 (Panachaiki FC)
- Indian Super League goal of the season: 2014

== See also ==
- List of men's footballers with 100 or more international caps
