= Nikola Malbaša =

Serbian footballer

Personal information
- Full name: Nikola Malbaša
- Date of birth: 12 September 1977 (age 49)
- Place of birth: Zemun, SR Serbia, SFR Yugoslavia
- Height: 1.79 m (5 ft 10 in)
- Position: Left-back

Youth career
- Zemun

Senior career*
Years	Team	Apps	(Gls)
1997–1998	Mladost Apatin	21	(0)
1998–2002	Hajduk Kula	100	(7)
2003–2004	Partizan	42	(1)
2004	Terek Grozny	0	(0)
2005–2006	AEK Athens	29	(0)
2006	TuS Koblenz	0	(0)
2007	Shandong Luneng	21	(0)
Total		213	(8)

International career
2003	Serbia and Montenegro	5	(0)
- * Club domestic league appearances and goals

Nikola Malbaša (Serbian Cyrillic: Никола Малбаша; born 12 September 1977) is a Serbian former professional footballer who played as a defender.

== Club career ==
In the 2003 winter transfer window, Malbaša was transferred to Partizan, signing a four-year contract with the club. He helped them qualify for the UEFA Champions League in the 2003–04 season.

In 18 January 2005, Malbaša signed with Greek club AEK Athens on a 2.5-year deal. In the summer of 2006 his contract was terminated and signed for the German side, TuS Koblenz.

== International career ==
Malbaša was capped five times for Serbia and Montenegro, making his international debut in a 2–1 home friendly loss to Bulgaria on 27 March 2003. His last cap for the national team came in a 4–3 away friendly loss against Poland on 16 November of that year.

== Career statistics ==
=== Club ===
Club	Season	League	
Club	Season	Apps	Goals
Hajduk Kula	1998–99	3	0
Hajduk Kula	1999–2000	25	0
Hajduk Kula	2000–01	27	1
Hajduk Kula	2001–02	29	2
Hajduk Kula	2002–03	16	4
Hajduk Kula	Total	100	7
Partizan	2002–03	15	1
Partizan	2003–04	27	0
Partizan	Total	42	1

=== International ===
National team	Year	Apps	Goals
Serbia and Montenegro	2003	5	0
Total		5	0

== Honours ==
Partizan

- First League of Serbia and Montenegro: 2002–03
