= Angelos Komvolidis =

German-born Greek footballer

Personal information
- Full name: Angelos Komvolidis
- Date of birth: 14 March 1988 (age 38)
- Place of birth: Stuttgart, West Germany
- Height: 1.83 m (6 ft 0 in)
- Position: Forward

Team information
- Current team: Enosis Leonberg

Youth career
- 1994–1999: TSV Eltingen
- 1999–2005: VfB Stuttgart

Senior career*
Years	Team	Apps	(Gls)
2005–2007	AEK Athens	0	(0)
2006	→ Thrasyvoulos (loan)		
2007	→ Ethnikos Piraeus (loan)	9	(0)
2007–2009	Iraklis	7	(2)
2009–2010	Anagennisi Karditsa	8	(0)
2010–2011	Kavala		
2011	Pontioi Katerini	6	(1)
2011–	Enosis Leonberg		
- * Club domestic league appearances and goals as of 1 July 2011

Angelos Komvolidis (Greek: Άγγελος Κομβολίδης; born 14 March 1988) is a Germany-born, Greek footballer plays for Enosis Leonberg.

== Club career ==
Komvolidis took his first steps as a footballer in the academies of TSV Eltingen at the age of 6. In 1999, he moved to the academies of VfB Stuttgart, where he was called to the Germany U16 and then to the Greece U19. On 26 May 2005 he was transferred to the Greek side, AEK Athens for a fee of €50,000. Even though Komvolidis left positive impressions in the pre-season matches, he eventually failed to gain the trust of the manager Fernando Santos. This and an injury to the medial meniscus, in January 2006, resulted in the player not making any official appearance in his first season. On 17 August 2006, he was loaned to Thrasyvoulos, but his loan was teminated mid-season and on 6 January 2007 he was loaned again at Ethnikos Piraeus alongside his teammate Dimitrios Koutromanos.

On 24 July 2007 Komvolidis was released from the club and signed for Iraklis, where he played for two seasons. Aftwerwards he spent a season at Anagennisi Karditsa and Kavala. In 2011 he moved to Pontioi Katerini for a brief spell and then to Enosis Leonberg.
