= Dimitrios Koutromanos =

Greek footballer

Personal information
- Full name: Dimitrios Koutromanos
- Date of birth: 25 February 1987 (age 39)
- Place of birth: Agrinio, Greece
- Height: 1.77 m (5 ft 10 in)
- Position: Right back

Youth career
- 1996–2001: Panetolikos

Senior career*
Years	Team	Apps	(Gls)
2004–2005	Panetolikos	29	(0)
2005–2011	AEK Athens	15	(0)
2006	→ Thrasyvoulos (loan)	2	(0)
2007	→ Ethnikos Piraeus (loan)	13	(0)
2007–2008	→ Anagennisi Karditsa (loan)	25	(1)
2010–2011	→ Anagennisi Karditsa (loan)	14	(0)
2011–2017	Panetolikos	72	(0)
2017–2018	Lamia	16	(0)
2018–2019	Iraklis	26	(0)
2020–2022	Anagennisi Karditsa	5	(0)
2022–2024	Asteras Karditsa		
2024–2026	AE Mouzaki		

International career
2005	Greece U19	5	(0)
- * Club domestic league appearances and goals as of 18:23, 7 November 2021 (UTC)

Dimitrios Koutromanos (Greek: Δημήτριος Κουτρομάνος; born 25 February 1987) is a Greek professional footballer who plays as a right back.

== Club career ==
Koutromanos began his professional career in 2004 at Panetolikos, where he played for a season. On 3 June 2005 he was transferred to AEK Athens for a fee of €50,000. On 17 August 2006, he was loaned to Thrasyvoulos, but his loan was teminated mid-season and on 6 January 2007 he was loaned again at Ethnikos Piraeus alongside his teammate Angelos Komvolidis. In the following season he was loaned at Anagennisi Karditsa. Afterwards he returned to AEK, where he spent a season as a back-up choice, but an injury in the following season resulted in losing his place in the squad. Thus, on 30 August 2010 he was loaned again to Anagennisi Karditsa. In the summer of 2011 his contract expired and Koutromanos returned to Panetolikos, where he played for 6 years. Afterwards he played a season at Lamia and Iraklis. In 2019 he left the club and after a season without a team he returned for a third time to Anagennisi Karditsa, where he became their captain. On 20 October 2022 he moved to Asteras Karditsa, where he spent two seasons, before joining AE Mouzakiou.

== International career ==
Koutromanos represented Greece U19 in 2005 making 5 appearnces.
