= Vasilios Pliatsikas =

Greek footballer

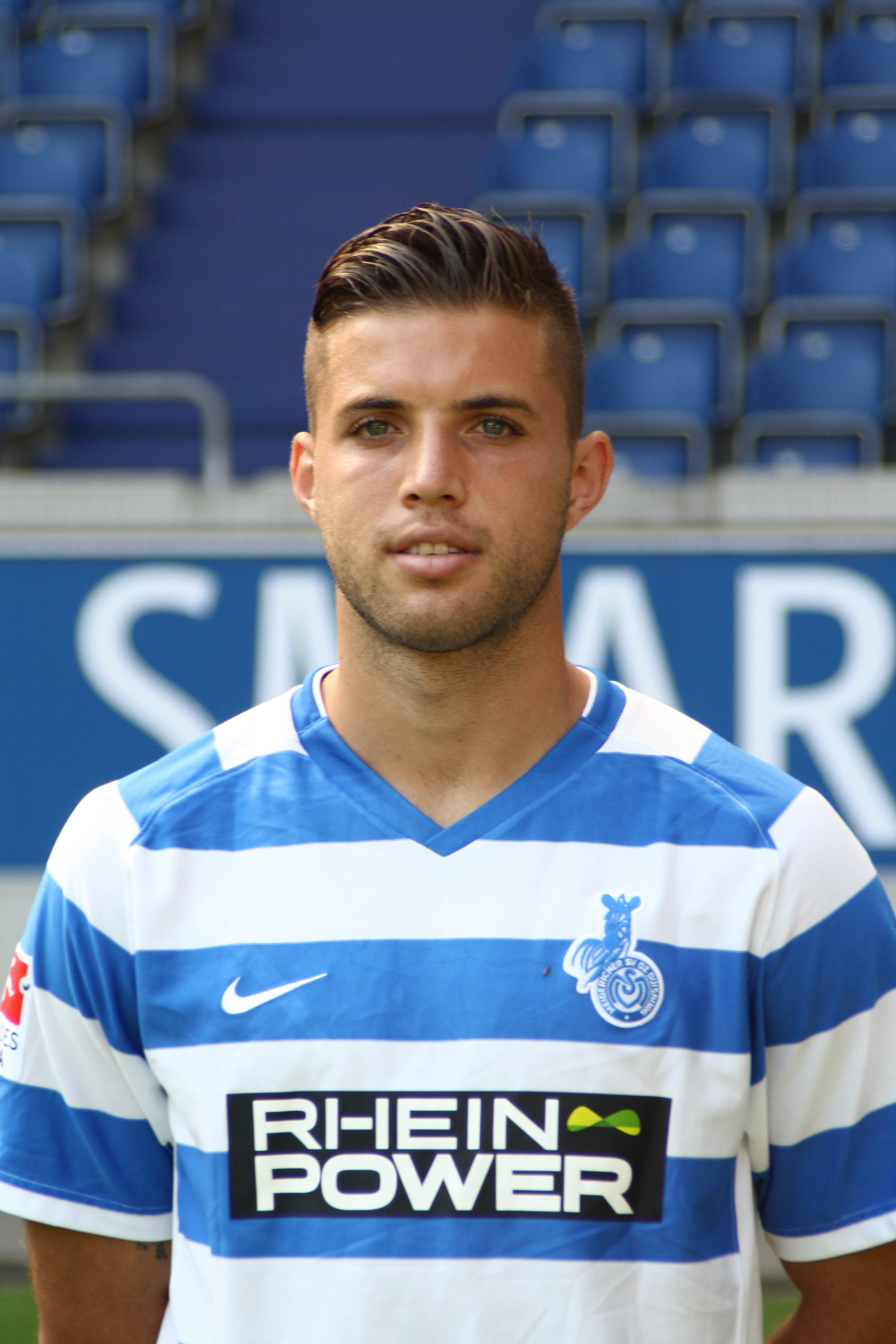

Personal information
- Full name: Vasilios Pliatsikas
- Date of birth: 14 April 1988 (age 38)
- Place of birth: Athens, Greece
- Height: 1.77 m (5 ft 10 in)
- Position: Centre-back

Youth career
- 2001–2002: Argolida 2000
- 2002–2003: Diovouniotis
- 2003–2004: Chaidari

Senior career*
Years	Team	Apps	(Gls)
2004–2005	Chaidari	5	(0)
2005–2009	AEK Athens	37	(0)
2009–2012	Schalke 04	9	(0)
2010–2013	Schalke 04 II	11	(1)
2011–2012	→ MSV Duisburg (loan)	22	(1)
2014	Metalurh Donetsk	10	(0)
2014–2015	Astra Giurgiu	11	(0)
2015–2016	Metalurh Donetsk	3	(0)
2016–2017	Slovan Bratislava	16	(0)
2017	Panionios	1	(0)
2017–2018	Platanias	14	(0)
2018–2020	Lamia	40	(0)
2020–2021	Panachaiki	14	(0)

International career^{‡}
2005–2007	Greece U19	20	(5)
2007–2010	Greece U21	12	(1)
2008–2011	Greece	5	(0)
- * Club domestic league appearances and goals as of 21 April 2021 ‡ National team caps and goals as of 31 December 2010

Vasilios Pliatsikas (Greek: Βασίλειος Πλιάτσικας; born 14 April 1988) is a Greek former professional footballer who played as a centre-back.

== Club career ==
=== AEK Athens ===
Pliatsikas began his professional career in 2004 at Chaidari. On 1 June 2005 he signed for AEK Athens.Making his way up from the reserve team, he ended up making 37 league appearances for AEK.

=== Schalke ===
On 30 June 2009, Pliatsikas was trasnferred to German club Schalke 04 for a fee of €300,000 and signed a four-year contract. The beginning of 2010 was not good as Pliatsikas tore his knee ligaments during a training session. This was a major blow as he was beginning to get consistent game time with his club and was in the reckoning for a starting place with his national team. He missed the rest of Schalke's season and also the FIFA World Cup with Greece. After a very difficult year for the defender marred by injury (149 days to be exact), Pliatsikas returned to action.

=== Loan to Duisburg ===
On 1 June 2011, Pliatsikas was loaned to MSV Duisburg for the upcoming season. In 2010–11, he could play only one match for Schalke because of his injury problems and so he should gain playing experiences in the 2. Bundesliga. In 2011, he agreed to be loaned from Schalke for a year to the second division MSV Duisburg. "I wanted to play. After the long period of injury, the season in Duisburg was a very good opportunity to stabilize and find myself playfully." Pliatsikas, was meanwhile converted by MSV coach Oliver Reck to a left-wing defender.

He made his debut in the opening game against Karlsruhe on 17 August, being in the starting line-up in Duisburg's 2–3 defeat. After several fouls, he was forced to leave the field with a yellow-red card in the 76th minute. In his fourth league match for Duisburg against St. Pauli, he was sent off with a yellow-red card again.

=== Metalurh Donetsk ===
Pliatsikas participated in the preparation of the club in Turkey, leaving a positive impression and convinced the technical staff to offer him a contract. Pliatsikas, who had become free since last summer from Schalke 04, signed a contract until the end of the season 2013/14 with a renewal option for three more years.

=== Astra Giurgiu ===
On 23 July 2014, Pliatsikas signed a 2-year contract with Astra Giurgiu. On 25 July 2014, he made his debut with a club in a 2–0 away win against Concordia Chiajna.

=== Second spell in Metalurh Donetsk ===
At the end of 2014 he returned to his former club Metalurh Donetsk. He released his contract at the end of 2014–15 season.

=== Slovan Bratislava ===
After six months as a free agent, on 26 January 2016, he signed a six months contract with Slovan Bratislava. He made his debut a month later in a 2–0 away win against AS Trenčín.

=== Return to Greece ===
Following a troublesome departure from Slovan, Pliatsikas returned to Greece to play for Panionios, with whom he had been training in the previous 3 months. During this six months he played only one game with the club. On 17 June 2017 Platanias announced the signing of Pliatsikas on a two-year contract. On 1 April 2018, due to imminent demotion to Football League experienced defensive midfielder is expected to be released from struggling Platanias, even before the end of 2017–18 Super League. On 4 June 2018, Lamia officially announced the signing of experienced right defender / defensive midfielder, until the summer of 2019.

== International career ==
=== Greece U19 ===
He was part of the Greek squad that reached the final of the 2007 UEFA European Under-19 Football Championship and went on to captain the U19 team the following year which reached the final eight this time round in the 2008 UEFA European Under-19 Football Championship.

=== Greece ===
He made his national team debut on 19 November 2008, coming on as an 87th-minute substitute against Italy in a 1–1 draw.

Greece's manager Otto Rehhagel called Pliatsikas for the three 2010 FIFA World Cup qualification matches against Luxembourg, Ukraine and Latvia where he played a pivotal role.

== Honours ==
Astra Giurgiu

- Supercupa României: 2014

Schalke 04

- DFB-Pokal: 2010–11
