= Ilias Kyriakidis =

Greek footballer

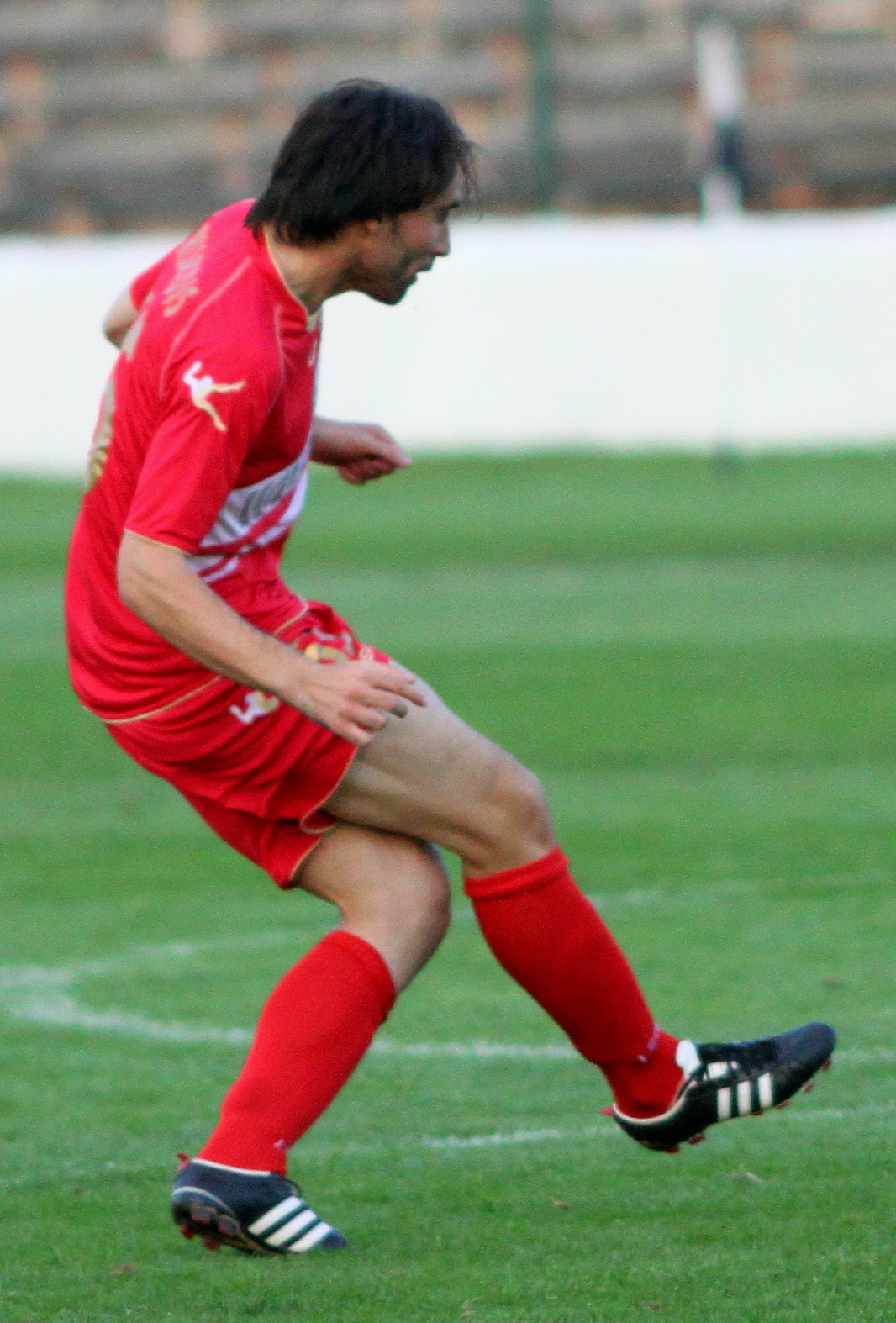

Personal information
- Date of birth: 5 August 1985 (age 41)
- Place of birth: Athens, Greece
- Height: 1.79 m (5 ft 10 1/2 in)
- Position: Midfielder

Team information
- Current team: AEK Athens (assistant manager)

Senior career*
Years	Team	Apps	(Gls)
2003–2004	Ionikos	9	(0)
2004–2007	AEK Athens	21	(0)
2007–2011	AEL	66	(2)
2011–2012	Ergotelis	28	(0)
2012	Lokomotiv Plovdiv	0	(0)
2012–2013	CSKA Sofia	4	(0)
2013–2014	AEL	0	(0)
2014–2017	Ionikos	0	(0)

International career^{‡}
2006	Greece U21	6	(0)

Managerial career
- 2025–: AEK Athens (assistant)
- * Club domestic league appearances and goals as of 18 August 2013 ‡ National team caps and goals as of 18 August 2013

Ilias Kyriakidis (Greek: Ηλίας Κυριακίδης; born 5 August 1985) is a Greek football manager and a former footballer who played as a midfielder. He is an assistant manager for AEK Athens.

== Club career ==
Kyriakidis started his professional career in 2003 at Ionikos. On 28 December 2004 he was transferred to AEK Athens for a fee of €200,000. There he played for 3.5 seasons and was primarily used as a back up choice, while he also competed in the Champions League. On 16 June 2007 Kyriakidis was transdferred to AEL for a fee of €225,000. In his first season he earned 24 caps for the league. After 3 seasons with the Thessalian club, he decided to continue his career elsewhere, having plans to move away from Greece. His next team however, was Greek side Ergotelis. On 2 January 2011 he signed a new contract for two years and a half with the club.

In the summer of 2012, Kyriakidis dissolved his contract with Ergotelis and sign for free with the Bulgarian Lokomotiv Plovdiv. During Lokomotiv pre-season preparation, the owner of the club – Konstantin Dinev decided to resign and left the team in bad financial situation.

CSKA Sofia took advantage of the situation and on 27 July 2012 they signed Kyriakidis as a free agent. On 30 September 2012 he made his debut for CSKA in 3–1 home win against Etar Veliko Tarnovo. In August 2013, he returned to Greece and signed once more with AEL.

== International career ==
Kyriakidis represented Greece U21 in 2006 making 6 appearnces.

== Managerial career ==
On 17 July 2024 Kyriakidis returned to AEK Athens and assumed the position of Sport Development and Education Manager. On 23 June 2025 he remained at the club and became the assistant manager of Marko Nikolić.
