= Júlio César (footballer, born February 1980) =

Brazilian footballer (born 1980)

Personal information
- Full name: Júlio César da Silva e Souza
- Date of birth: 26 February 1980 (age 46)
- Place of birth: Itaguaí, Brazil
- Height: 1.78 m (5 ft 10 in)
- Position: Forward

Senior career*
Years	Team	Apps	(Gls)
1997–2002	Fluminense	80	(14)
2002–2004	Lokomotiv Moscow	21	(4)
2004	Estrela da Amadora	30	(10)
2004–2005	Gil Vicente	16	(2)
2005–2008	AEK Athens	88	(18)
2008–2009	Rapid București	15	(2)
2009–2011	Gaziantepspor	50	(16)
2011–2012	Figueirense	51	(16)
2013–2015	Coritiba	29	(3)
2015–2016	Ceará	17	(3)
2016	Mirassol	0	(0)
2016	FC Goa	11	(1)
2017–2018	Madureira	0	(0)
Total		408	(89)
- * Club domestic league appearances and goals

Júlio César da Silva e Souza (born 26 February 1980) is a Brazilian former professional footballer who played as a forward.

== Club career ==
César started his career in 1997 at Fluminense. During his five-year spell at the club he won the Campeonato Carioca in 2002. Afterwards he moved to Russia and signed for Lokomotiv Moscow. There he won the Russian Championship in 2002 and the Russian Super Cup in 2003. In 2004 he traveled to Portugal and played for Estrela da Amadora and then Gil Vicente. On 17 January 2005 César was transferred to the Greek side AEK Athens for a fee of €540,000. He scored the goal in the famous 1–0 win for AEK against AC Milan in front of over 69.000 spectators in the Athens Olympic Stadium with a direct free kick.

In the summer of 2008 his contract was expired and César signed for the Romanian Rapid București. He was released by Rapid București during the winter break because he did not play as good as expected for the money spent on him, he was the highest paid member of the squad and also Rapid had financial problems. In the following season he played for Turkish side Gaziantepspor. In the 2009–10 season he scored 13 goals for Gaziantepspor, making him the top goalscorer of the team and the second goalscorer of the Turkish Süper Lig, after Ariza Makukula.

== Honours ==
Fluminense

- Campeonato Carioca: 2002

Lokomotiv Moscow

- Russian Premier League: 2002
- Russian Super Cup: 2003

Coritiba

- Campeonato Paranaense: 2013
