= Georgios Alexopoulos =

Greek footballer and manager (born 1977)

Giorgos Alexopoulos
Personal information
- Full name: Georgios Alexopoulos
- Date of birth: 7 February 1977 (age 49)
- Place of birth: Athens, Greece
- Height: 1.84 m (6 ft 0 in)
- Position: Centre-back

Youth career
- 1994–1996: Panathinaikos

Senior career*
Years	Team	Apps	(Gls)
1996–2000	Panathinaikos	45	(3)
2000–2001	Iraklis	16	(1)
2001–2005	Egaleo	90	(3)
2005–2010	AEK Athens	48	(3)
2010–2011	Ergotelis	10	(0)
Total		209	(10)

International career^{‡}
–1998	Greece U21	33	(0)
2005–2006	Greece	4	(0)

Managerial career
- 2011–2012: AEK Athens (assistant)
- 2012: Xanthi (assistant)
- 2014: Anorthosis Famagusta (assistant)
- 2014: Apollon Smyrnis (assistant)
- 2016–2017: PAO Kamatero
- 2017–2018: AEK Athens U20 (assistant)
- 2018–2019: AEK Athens U17
- 2019: AEK Athens U19
- 2019: AEK Athens (assistant)
- 2021–2022: Egaleo
- 2023: Proodeftiki (assistant)
- 2023: Proodeftiki (caretaker)
- * Club domestic league appearances and goals as of 9 June 2011 ‡ National team caps and goals as of 1 September 2006

Georgios Alexopoulos (Greek: Γεώργιος Αλεξόπουλος; born 7 February 1977) is a Greek former professional footballer who played as a centre-back. He also played for Greece U21 and the Greece national team.

== Club career ==
Alexopoulos began his career in the academy of Panathinaikos, where in 1996 was promoted to the men's team. He played at the club for 7 seasons, without being able to win any titles with the club. In 2000 transferred to Iraklis, where he played for a year and then he moved to Egaleo, where he became a leading figure. In the summer of 2005 he signed for AEK Athens. Alexopoulos made 30 appearances in Greek League and also scored 3 goals until he was seriously injured. On 16 April 2008, he returned to full training and was expected to be ready for the next season. In the 2008–09 season he returned and made 12 appearances serving as back-up choice to Daniel Majstorović and Sotirios Kyrgiakos. On 15 July 2010 after his contract with AEK was expired Alexopoulos moved to Ergotelis where he played for a season. On 31 August 2011 he decided to retire as a footballer after series of serious injuries.
