= Alessandro Soares =

Brazilian footballer (born 1973)

Personal information
- Date of birth: 5 February 1973 (age 53)
- Place of birth: Rio de Janeiro, Brazil
- Height: 1.74 m (5 ft 9 in)
- Position: Forward

Senior career*
Years	Team	Apps	(Gls)
1996–1997	Montes Claros		
1997–2001	Kalamata	98	(26)
2001–2004	OFI	84	(20)
2004–2005	→ AEK Athens (loan)	25	(11)
2005–2006	AEK Athens	28	(2)
2006–2007	Anorthosis Famagusta	23	(3)
2007–2008	Alki Larnaca	23	(5)
2008–2009	Ermis Aradippou		(7)
2009–2010	Chalkanoras Idaliou		(18)
2011–2013	Funorte		
2013–2014	Montes Claros		
- * Club domestic league appearances and goals

Alessandro Soares (born 5 February 1973) is a former Brazilian professional footballer who played as a forward. He is known in Greece by the nickname "Giannis" which given to him by his then coach in Kalamata, Jacek Gmoch. He himself was so "tied" to this nickname that he baptized his little son who was born in Greece with the name "Giannis".

== Club career ==
Soares started his professional career in Montes Claros. In 1997, the contacts and connections of the then major shareholder of Kalamata, Stavros Papadopoulos, with the Brazilian market of football players, and suggested hid transfer to Greece. After a tryout by the then coach of the Messinians, Babis Tennes, he signed for the club playing with the team for four seasons.

In 2001 he was signed by OFI, where he played until 2004. In the summer of 2004, he caught the interest of Panathinaikos and AEK Athens. Eventually, the manager of the "greens", Zdeněk Ščasný suggested the acquisition of another striker, thus on 23 July 2004 he was signed by AEK, with a season-long loan for a fee of €60,000 and a buy-out option. On his first season with the yellow-blacks he emerged as the club's top scorer, while playing 7 matches in the UEFA Cup scoring once against Gorica on 30 September 2004. His performances with the club resulted in the enable of his buy-out option of €150,000 on 6 June 2005. He repeatedly tried to obtain Greek citizenship but three times he fell victim to the change in legislation and the increase of the years of residence required for its granting.

In the summer of 2006 after the end of his contract he moved to Cyprus and joined Anorthosis Famagusta. On 12 May 2007, he won Cypriot Cup scoring in the 3–2 final against Omonia. In the summer of 2007 he signed for Alki Larnaca, where he played for a season. In 2008 he also played for Cypriot Second Division side, Ermis Aradippou, helping them win promotion to the Cypriot First Division in 2009. Afterwards, he moved to Chalkanoras Idaliou, where he helped them win the Cypriot Third Division in 2010 by finishing as first scorer of the league with 17 goals.

== Honours ==
Anorthosis Famagusta

- Cypriot First Division: 2006–07
- Cypriot Cup: 2006–07

Alki Larnaca

- Cypriot Second Division: 2008–09

Chalkanoras Idaliou

- Cypriot Third Division: 2009–10

Individual

- Cypriot Third Division top scorer: 2009–10
