= Bruno Cirillo =

Italian footballer (born 1977)

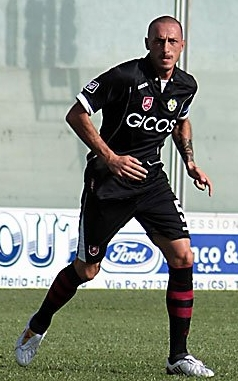
- Cirillo playing for Reggina in 2008

Personal information
- Date of birth: 21 March 1977 (age 49)
- Place of birth: Castellammare di Stabia, Italy
- Height: 1.86 m (6 ft 1 in)
- Position: Centre-back

Youth career
- Reggina

Senior career*
Years	Team	Apps	(Gls)
1994–2000	Reggina	49	(2)
1996–1998	→ Tricase Calcio (loan)	54	(4)
2000–2001	Internazionale	17	(0)
2001–2005	Lecce	32	(4)
2002	→ Reggina (loan)	10	(0)
2003–2005	→ Siena (loan)	54	(0)
2005–2007	AEK Athens	50	(2)
2007–2008	Levante	16	(0)
2008	→ Reggina (loan)	18	(0)
2008–2009	Reggina	31	(0)
2009–2012	PAOK	74	(4)
2012	Alki Larnaca	7	(0)
2013	Metz	15	(0)
2013–2014	AEK Athens	12	(0)
2014	Pune City	14	(0)
2015	Reggina	16	(0)
Total		469	(16)

International career
1999–2000	Italy U21	11	(0)
2000	Italy Olympic	4	(0)
- * Club domestic league appearances and goals

Bruno Cirillo (born 21 March 1977) is an Italian former professional footballer who played as a centre-back.

He moved clubs frequently throughout his career, spending two spells at AEK Athens and a further three years at PAOK, both in Greece, in addition to brief spells in Spain, Cyprus, France and India.

Cirillo played for Italy at under-21 level and was included in their squad for the 2000 Olympics.

== Club career ==
=== Italy ===
Born in Castellammare di Stabia, Cirillo started his career in the ranks of Reggina, and started enjoying regular first-team football after a 1996–97 switch to Serie C2 Tricase Calcio. In the summer of 1998, he returned to Reggina and helped them to promotion to Serie A. The following season was even better, with Cirillo scoring twice in 32 matches and catching the eye of FC Internazionale Milano, joining in 2000. He appeared 24 times in his sole season in Milan before moving to U.S. Lecce for 6,000 million lire in co-ownership deal along with Giorgio Frezzolini for 2,500 million lire in co-ownership deal (swapped with Erminio Rullo of Lecce for 3,000 million lire in co-ownership deal and 5,500 million lire cash). In June 2002, Lecce acquired Cirillo (€306,000), Frezzolini (free) and Rullo (€151,000) outright.

Cirillo then returned to Reggina in 2002–03, rejoined Lecce and was loaned to AC Siena in quick succession.

=== AEK Athens ===
On 13 July 2005 Cirillo signed for the Greek club, AEK Athens. He proved influential for the Greek runners-up spot in 2006 and 2007. On 29 April 2007, Cirillo played his last match with AEK against Skoda Xanthi in the Super League Greece, where he was given the Man of the Match award. After the end of the season his contract was terminated.

=== Later career ===
On 4 July 2007, Cirillo signed a two-year deal for Spanish outfit Levante UD. In January 2008, due to Levante's inability to pay agreed wages he, alongside countryman Marco Storari left the club, with Cirillo signing for Reggina, the club where he grew as a player. Cirillo mutually terminated his contract with Reggina in June 2009, and later that month PAOK FC signed him until June 2011 on free transfer.

On 28 January 2013, Cirillo signed a six-month deal for French club Metz, with the option of a further year. This option was not taken, and on 26 August 2013, Cirillo signed a one-year private agreement for AEK Athens, returning to the club after six years.

On 21 August 2014, Cirillo was the first pick in the Indian Super League Inaugural International Draft, signed by Pune City.

In 2015, he returned to Reggina, the club in which he started his career, to finish his career there. He retired in 2015 and now he plans on becoming a manager in the future.

== International career ==
Cirillo played every second of Italy's campaign at the 2000 Olympics in Australia, in which they reached the quarter-finals before elimination by Spain.

== Personal life ==
In 2007, Cirillo began dating Greek actress and model Elena Asimakopoulou. On October 4, 2010, the couple got married in a civil ceremony, and two months later, on December 13, their daughter, Maria-Rosaria Cirillo, was born. They also married in a religious ceremony on May 19, 2018. Τhey separated in 2022.

== Career statistics ==
Appearances and goals by club, season and competition
Club	Season	League			Cup (Note: Includes two appearances in the semi-professional Gamma Ethniki Cup)		Europe		Other		Total	
Club	Season	Division	Apps	Goals	Apps	Goals	Apps	Goals	Apps	Goals	Apps	Goals
Reggina	1994-95	Serie C1 Girone B	1	0	—		—		—		1	0
Reggina	1995–96	Serie B	0	0	—		—		0	0	0	0
Reggina	1998–99	Serie B	16	0	2	0	—		—		18	0
Reggina	1999–2000	Serie A	32	2	4	0	—		—		36	2
Reggina	Total		49	2	6	0	0	0	0	0	55	2
Tricase Calcio (loan)	1996–97	Serie C2	24	2	—		—		—		24	2
Tricase Calcio (loan)	1997–98	Serie C2	30	2	—		—		—		30	2
Tricase Calcio (loan)	Total		54	4	—		—		0	0	54	4
Inter Milan	2000–01	Serie A	17	0	2	0	7	0	0	0	26	0
Lecce	2001–02	Serie A	18	3	2	0	—		—		20	3
Lecce	2002–03	Serie B	14	1	0	0	—		—		14	1
Lecce	Total		32	4	2	0	0	0	0	0	36	2
Reggina (loan)	2002–03	Serie A	10	0	6	0	—		—		16	0
Siena (loan)	2003–04	Serie A	23	0	2	0	—		—		25	0
Siena (loan)	2004–05	Serie A	31	0	3	1	—		0	0	34	1
Siena (loan)	Total		54	0	5	1	0	0	0	0	59	1
AEK Athens	2005–06	Super League Greece	24	2	2	1	2	0	0	0	28	3
AEK Athens	2006–07	Super League Greece	26	0	0	0	10	1	0	0	36	1
AEK Athens	Total		50	2	2	1	12	1	0	0	64	4
Levante	2007–08	La Liga	16	0	2	0	—		—		18	0
Reggina (loan)	2007–08	Serie A	18	0	0	0	—		—		18	0
Reggina	2008–09	Serie A	32	0	0	0	—		—		32	0
PAOK	2009–10	Super League Greece	25	2	0	0	4	0	0	0	29	2
PAOK	2010–11	Super League Greece	25	1	5	0	9	0	0	0	39	1
PAOK	2011–12	Super League Greece	23	1	2	0	10	0	0	0	35	1
PAOK	Total		73	4	7	0	23	0	0	0	103	4
Alki Larnaca	2012–13	Cypriot First Division	7	0	0	0	0	0	0	0	7	0
Metz	2012–13	Championnat National	15	0	0	0	0	0	0	0	15	0
AEK Athens	2013–14	Gamma Ethniki	11	0	2	0	—		—		13	0
Pune City	2014	Indian Super League	14	0	0	0	—		—		14	0
Reggina	2014–15	Serie C	16	0	0	0	—		—		16	0
Career total			468	16	34	2	42	1	0	0	544	19

== Honours ==
Reggina

- Serie C1 Girone B: 1994–95

AEK Athens

- Football League 2: 2014 (6th Group)

Italy U21

- UEFA European Under-21 Championship: 2000
