= 2004–05 AEK Athens F.C. season =

AEK Athens
2004–05 season
- Chairman: Alexis Kougias (until 8 July); Andreas Dimitrelos (until 3 August); Demis Nikolaidis
- Manager: Fernando Santos
- Stadium: Athens Olympic Stadium
- Alpha Ethniki: 3rd
- Greek Cup: Semi-finals
- UEFA Cup: Group stage
- Top goalscorer: League: Alessandro Soares (11); All: Alessandro Soares (15)
- Highest home attendance: 63,129 vs Olympiacos (7 November 2004)
- Lowest home attendance: 763 vs Agios Dimitrios (22 December 2004)
- Average home league attendance: 27,647
- Biggest win: Agios Dimitrios 1–4 AEK Athens; AEK Athens 4–1 Kallithea; AEK Athens 3–0 Agios Dimitrios; AEK Athens 3–0 Apollon Kalamarias
- Biggest defeat: Zenit Saint Petersburg 5–1 AEK Athens
Home colours	Away colours	Third colours

The 2004–05 season was the 81st season in the existence of AEK Athens F.C. and the 46th consecutive season in the top flight of Greek football. They competed in the Alpha Ethniki, the Greek Cup and the UEFA Cup. The season began on 11 September 2004 and finished on 25 May 2005.

== Kits ==
Supplier: Adidas / Nike
Sponsor(s): TIM

Home	Away	Third	Home 2004	Away 2004	Third 2004

== Overview ==
The season found AEK faced with annihilation, since their debts were unmanageable and unmanageable for anyone. The former star of the team, Demis Nikolaidis and a group of partners and friends of the club, put on the carpet the plan of being included in the article 44 of the bankruptcy law and on 7 July he took over the administration. The article 44 was an inspiration of the economist Giorgos Kintis, who elaborated the plan and as soon as the first financiers and the leader Nikolaidis were found, hope began to fade. AEK went to court, but its first application in May was rejected. In the meantime, Nikolaidis, having the full support of the club's supporters, came to an agreement with the majority of the footballers for part of the dues and planned as best he could the continuation of the team's competition. Nikolaidis proceeded with some partial agreements, managed and set up a budget and mainly persuaded the team's former coach Fernando Santos to return to Greece, with a clause that if the team went bankrupt, he would be free. The roster that the Portuguese had in his hands to work with was lacking, since the big stars had left with the only remaining ones being Kostas Katsouranis and Nikos Liberopoulos as well as the veterans, Nikos Kostenoglou and Nikolaos Georgeas, while at the end of the transfer period, with personal actions of Santos, they acquired Bruno Alves and Paulo Assunção on loan from Porto. Meanwhile, the article 44 legal battle continued and the season of uncertainty began with the world turning its attention to the very existence of AEK, which depended on the court's final verdict. The fans of AEK showed their opposition to the annihilation of the team in every way either with a banner in Rizoupoli or with the historic rally of October 2004 in the centor of Athens, where more than 10 thousand people demonstrated in favor of saving the team. On 18 November the club was vindicated and the team looked to the future with optimism.

Freed from the stress of existence itself and in an unprecedented climate of rallying and unity, AEK began a run in the league with back-to-back victories and April found them equal contenders for the championship. AEK became the favorite, since in front of them is the easy game against Ionikos at the Olympic Stadium, but the team from Nikaia with a goal at the end, cut the hopes for the championship in history and the 0–0 draw in the game against Panathinaikos at Leoforos Alexandras Stadium, in a match where AEK had many complaints from the referee, limited them in the third place.

The participation in the groups of the UEFA Cup was of vital importance for AEK, who were in dire need of the income from the European participation, which was barely secured from UEFA. The Slovenians from Gorica seemed like an easy opponent, but for AEK, which were in the uncertainty of bankruptcy, they turned out to be difficult. The game at Sports Park went wrong from the beginning, as AEK conceded a goal, but luckily, they equalized by the end of the half-time. The score did not change despite the pressure from the Slovenians, AEK stood up and became the favorite. The tense rematch was played in an intense atmosphere in Georgios Kamaras Stadium, after AEK fans turned it into a sustained protest against the negative decision of the article 44. The team in the first half tried, but in the second half they were in serious danger even with exclusion from the Slovenians, but with a goal at the end of the game, AEK advanced to the group stage. There, in a relatively difficult draw, they found themselves in the same group as Sevilla, Lille, Zenit Saint Petersburg and Alemannia Aachen, where they had a very bad campaign with 4 defeats in equal matches, thus staying out of the continuation of the tournament.

The course of the team in the Cup was similar, where after eliminating PANO Malia and Agios Dimitrios, they found in front of them the double winner of the previous season, Panathinaikos. The first leg ended in a draw at the Olympic Stadium, after Liberopoulos equalized the goal of Konstantinou. Panathinaikos confirmed the title of favourite, until the return leg, on a big night for AEK, who opened the scoring through Katsouranis early on, but were equalized after heavy pressure from Panathinaikos. Somewhere there the team of Santos woke up and immediately took the lead again, until in the 77th minute Vladimir Ivić in his most important goal with AEK, sealed an emphatic qualification calling the fans of the host to be quiet. The quarter-finals seemed like an easy mission for AEK and indeed Panionios turned out to be an easy opponent, since after the indifferent 0–0 at Nea Smyrni, prevailed easyly by 2–0. AEK were in the semi-finals and they were going for the double. Their opponent were Olympiacos who had re-hired Dušan Bajević, whom they dominated at the Olympic Stadium, despite the final loss with 0–1. The rematch at Karaiskakis Stadium seemed difficult, but AEK scored and the match went to extra time. The referee and his assistants were doing everything they could to push Olympiacos to qualify and thus with the expulsion of Júlio César the game turned into a monologue for Olympiacos who was redeemed by an own from Moras and while the attacks of AEK were cut as allegedly offside, Okkas sealed his team's qualification 2 minutes before the end of extra time. AEK were eliminated in the semi-finals that were admittedly better than their opponent.

== Management team ==
Position	Staff
Manager	(Portugal) Fernando Santos
Assistant manager	(Bosnia and Herzegovina) Jasminko Velić
Assistant manager	(Portugal) Jorge Rosário
Assistant manager	(Greece) Antonis Minou
Goalkeeping coach	(Serbia and Montenegro) Slobodan Šujica
Fitness coach	(Cyprus) Antonis Kezos
Director of Football	(Serbia and Montenegro) Ilija Ivić
Technical director	(Netherlands) Eugène Gerards
Academy director	(North Macedonia) Toni Savevski
U17 Manager	(Greece) Charis Kopitsis
Academy manager	(Albania) Bledar Kola
Scout	(Netherlands) Eugène Gerards
Head of Medical	(Greece) Lakis Nikolaou

== Players ==
=== Squad information ===
NOTE: The players are the ones that have been announced by the AEK Athens' press release. No edits should be made unless a player arrival or exit is announced. Updated 25 May 2005, 23:59 UTC+3.

No.	Player	Nat.	Position(s)	Date of birth (Age)	Signed	Previous club	Transfer fee	Contract until
Goalkeepers
1	Chrysostomos Michailidis	(Greece)	GK	15 January 1975 (aged 30)	1997	(Greece) Eordaikos	Free	2005
12	Giannis Arabatzis	(Greece)	GK	28 May 1984 (aged 21)	2002	(Greece) Enosi Apostolou Pavlou	€22,000	2007
22	Dionysis Chiotis (Vice-captain 2)	(Greece)	GK	4 June 1977 (aged 28)	1995	(Greece) AEK Athens U20	—	2007
Defenders
3	Nikola Malbaša	(Serbia and Montenegro)	LB / LM	12 September 1977 (aged 27)	2004	(Russia) Terek Grozny	Free	2007
4	Bruno Alves	(Portugal)	CB / DM	27 November 1981 (aged 23)	2004	(Portugal) Porto	Free	2005
5	Nikos Kostenoglou (Vice-captain)	(Greece)	CB / RB	3 October 1970 (aged 34)	1994	(Greece) Skoda Xanthi	€200,000	2005
14	Stavros Tziortziopoulos	(Greece)	LB / CB / LM	15 August 1978 (aged 26)	2004	(Greece) Panionios	Free	2007
15	Dimitris Koutsikos	(Greece)	RB / DM	20 April 1988 (aged 17)	2004	(Greece) AEK Athens U20	—	2006
16	Nikolaos Georgeas	(Greece)	RB / LB / DM	27 December 1976 (aged 28)	2001	(Greece) Kalamata	€1,500,000	2008
18	Vangelis Moras	(Greece)	CB / DM / RB	26 August 1981 (aged 23)	2003	(Greece) Proodeftiki	€260,000	2007
24	Christos Kontis	(Greece)	RB / CB / LB	13 May 1975 (aged 30)	2004	(Greece) Panionios	Free	2007
27	Panagiotis Stergiatos	(Greece)	CB	3 March 1986 (aged 19)	2003	(Greece) AEK Athens U20	—	2008
39	Grigoris Toskas	(Greece)	CB	8 January 1983 (aged 22)	2000	(Greece) AEK Athens U20	—	2005
Midfielders
8	Ivan Rusev	(Bulgaria)	AM / RM / LM / CM	10 May 1979 (aged 26)	2001	(Bulgaria) Spartak Varna	Free	2005
9	Milen Petkov	(Bulgaria)	DM / CM / AM / RM / LM	12 January 1974 (aged 31)	2000	(Bulgaria) CSKA Sofia	€800,000	2005
17	Vladan Ivić	(Serbia and Montenegro)	AM / CM / RM / LM	7 May 1977 (aged 28)	2004	(Germany) Borussia Mönchengladbach	Free	2007
21	Kostas Katsouranis (Captain)	(Greece)	CM / DM / RM / LM / AM / CB / RB / LB	21 June 1979 (aged 26)	2002	(Greece) Panachaiki	Free	2007
26	Ilias Kyriakidis	(Greece)	DM / CM / AM	5 August 1985 (aged 19)	2004	(Greece) Ionikos	€200,000	2009
28	Christos Bourbos	(Greece)	RM / RB / LM / LB / RW / DM	1 June 1983 (aged 22)	2004	(Greece) PAS Giannina	Free	2008
77	Paulo Assunção	(Brazil)	DM / CM	25 January 1980 (aged 25)	2004	(Portugal) Porto	Free	2005
Forwards
7	Alessandro Soares	(Brazil)	RW / SS / ST / LW	5 February 1973 (aged 32)	2004	(Greece) OFI	€60,000	2005
10	Sotiris Konstantinidis	(Greece)	RW / LW / RM / LM / AM	19 April 1979 (aged 26)	1999	(Greece) Iraklis	Free	2005
11	Leonidas Kampantais	(Greece)	ST / SS / RW	8 March 1982 (aged 23)	2004	(Greece) Aris	Free	2007
20	Ilias Solakis	(Greece)	ST	15 December 1974 (aged 28)	2002	(Cyprus) APOEL	Free	2007
29	Christos Christoforidis	(Sweden) (Greece)	LW / ST / SS	31 December 1981 (aged 23)	2005	(Sweden) Assyriska FF	Free	2005
30	Simos Krassas	(Cyprus) (Greece)	RW / LW / RM / LM	10 June 1982 (aged 23)	2004	(Cyprus) AEL Limassol	€120,000	2008
33	Nikos Liberopoulos	(Greece)	SS / ST / AM	4 August 1975 (aged 29)	2003	(Greece) Panathinaikos	Free	2007
44	Nikos Voulgaris	(Greece)	ST	30 August 1985 (aged 19)	2004	(Italy) Torino Primavera	€100,000	2005
99	Júlio César	(Brazil)	LW / SS / AM / RW / ST	26 February 1980 (aged 25)	2005	(Portugal) Gil Vicente	€540,000	2005
—	Christos Kostis	(Greece)	SS / ST / AM / RW / LW	15 January 1972 (aged 33)	2000	(Belgium) Anderlecht	Free	2005
Left during Winter Transfer Window
2	Stathis Kappos	(Greece) (Canada)	RB	31 July 1979 (aged 25)	2001	(Greece) Kalamata	Free	2005
6	Stelios Maistrellis	(Greece)	CB	10 November 1979 (aged 25)	2002	(Greece) Aiolikos	Free	2006
25	Kofi Amponsah	(Ghana)	CB / LB	19 April 1978 (aged 27)	2003	(Greece) PAOK	Free	2006
19	Manolis Tsagarogiannakis	(Greece)	AM	30 January 1986 (aged 19)	2004	(Greece) Gyziakos	Free	2009
32	Christos Tsevas	(Greece)	AM	8 June 1985 (aged 20)	2003	(Greece) AEK Athens U20	—	2008

== Transfers ==
=== In ===
==== Summer ====
No.	Pos.	Player	From	Fee	Date	Contract Until	Source
6	DF	(Greece) Stelios Maistrellis	(Greece) Akratitos	Loan return	1 July 2004	30 June 2006	
11	FW	(Greece) Leonidas Kampantais	(Greece) Aris	Free transfer	30 July 2004	30 June 2007	
14	DF	(Greece) Stavros Tziortziopoulos	(Greece) Panionios	Free transfer	14 July 2004	30 June 2007	
15	DF	(Greece) Dimitris Koutsikos	(Greece) AEK Athens U20	Promotion	30 July 2004	30 June 2006	
19	MF	(Greece) Manolis Tsagarogiannakis	(Greece) Gyziakos	Free transfer	2 August 2004	30 June 2009	
20	FW	(Greece) Ilias Solakis	(Greece) Niki Volos	Loan return	1 July 2004	30 June 2006	
24	DF	(Greece) Christos Kontis	(Greece) Panionios	Free transfer	19 July 2004	30 June 2007	
28	MF	(Greece) Christos Bourbos	(Greece) PAS Giannina	Free transfer	30 July 2004	30 June 2008	
30	FW	(Cyprus) Simos Krassas	(Cyprus) AEL Limassol	€120,000	30 July 2004	30 June 2008	
44	FW	(Greece) Nikos Voulgaris	(Italy) Torino Primavera	€100,000	30 July 2004	30 June 2005	

==== Winter ====
No.	Pos.	Player	From	Fee	Date	Contract Until	Source
3	DF	(Serbia and Montenegro) Nikola Malbaša	(Russia) Terek Grozny	Free transfer	18 December 2004	30 June 2007	
17	MF	(Serbia and Montenegro) Vladan Ivić	(Germany) Borussia Mönchengladbach	Free transfer	21 December 2004	31 December 2007	
26	MF	(Greece) Ilias Kyriakidis	(Greece) Ionikos	€200,000	28 December 2004	31 December 2009	
29	FW	(Sweden) Christos Christoforidis	(Sweden) Assyriska FF	Free transfer	18 January 2005	31 December 2005	
99	FW	(Brazil) Júlio César	(Portugal) Gil Vicente	€540,000	17 January 2005	31 December 2005	

=== Out ===
==== Summer ====
No.	Pos.	Player	To	Fee	Date	Source
2	DF	(Greece) Vasilios Borbokis	(Cyprus) Anorthosis Famagusta	End of contract	3 August 2004	
6	MF	(Greece) Theodoros Zagorakis	(Italy) Bologna	Contract termination	24 July 2004	
8	DF	(Netherlands) Michel Kreek	(Netherlands) Willem II	End of contract	1 July 2004	
9	FW	(Cyprus) Ioannis Okkas	(Greece) Olympiacos	Contract termination	2 August 2004	
10	MF	(Greece) Vasilios Tsiartas	(Germany) 1. FC Köln	Contract termination	30 November 2004	
12	GK	(Greece) Sotiris Liberopoulos	(Greece) Aris	Contract termination	20 July 2004	
17	DF	(Greece) Michalis Kasapis	Retired		4 August 2004	
23	MF	(Greece) Vasilios Lakis	(England) Crystal Palace	Contract termination	29 September 2004	
25	DF	(North Macedonia) Goran Popov	(North Macedonia) Belasica	Loan return	1 July 2004	
30	FW	(Serbia and Montenegro) Ilija Ivić	Retired		11 July 2004	
32	DF	(Greece) Michalis Kapsis	(France) Bordeaux	€500,000	26 July 2004	
88	FW	(Greece) Dimitris Nalitzis	(Greece) Kerkyra	Contract termination	28 July 2004	
—	MF	(United States) Peter Philipakos	(Greece) Olympiacos	Contract termination	31 July 2004	

==== Winter ====
No.	Pos.	Player	To	Fee	Date	Source
2	DF	(Canada) Stathis Kappos	(Greece) Aris	Contract termination	14 January 2005	
6	DF	(Greece) Stelios Maistrellis	(Greece) Levadiakos	Contract termination	31 January 2005	
19	DF	(Ghana) Kofi Amponsah	(Greece) Egaleo	Contract termination	29 January 2005	
32	MF	(Greece) Christos Tsevas	(Greece) Akratitos	Contract termination	12 January 2005	

=== Loan in ===
==== Summer ====
No.	Pos.	Player	From	Fee	Date	Until	Option to buy	Source
4	DF	(Portugal) Bruno Alves	(Portugal) Porto	Free	2 August 2004	30 June 2005	✗	
7	FW	(Brazil) Alessandro Soares	(Greece) OFI	€60,000	23 July 2004	30 June 2005	✓	
77	MF	(Brazil) Paulo Assunção	(Portugal) Porto	Free	2 August 2004	30 June 2005	✗	

=== Loan out ===
==== Summer ====
No.	Pos.	Player	To	Fee	Date	Until	Option to buy	Source
35	MF	(Greece) Dimitris Karameris	(Greece) Levadiakos	Free	31 July 2004	30 June 2005	✗	

==== Winter ====
No.	Pos.	Player	To	Fee	Date	Until	Option to buy	Source
19	MF	(Greece) Manolis Tsagarogiannakis	(Greece) Agia Paraskevi	Free	1 January 2005	30 June 2006	✗	

=== Contract renewals ===
No.	Pos.	Player	Date	Former Exp. Date	New Exp. Date	Source
9	MF	(Bulgaria) Milen Petkov	22 July 2004	30 June 2004	30 June 2005	
10	FW	(Greece) Sotiris Konstantinidis	22 July 2004	30 June 2007	30 June 2005	
16	DF	(Greece) Nikolaos Georgeas	16 July 2004	31 December 2007	30 June 2008	
21	MF	(Greece) Kostas Katsouranis	24 July 2004	30 June 2005	30 June 2007	
22	GK	(Greece) Dionysis Chiotis	1 June 2005	30 June 2005	30 June 2007	
33	FW	(Greece) Nikos Liberopoulos	21 July 2004	30 June 2006	30 June 2007	

=== Overall transfer activity ===
==== Expenditure ====
Summer: ▼€280,000

Winter: ▼€740,000

Total: ▼€1,020,000

==== Income ====
Summer: ▲€500,000

Winter: ▲€0

Total: ▲€500,000

==== Net Totals ====
Summer: ▲€220,000

Winter: ▼€740,000

Total: ▼€520,000

== Pre-season and friendlies ==
31 July 2004 Friendly	AEK Athens	3–0	Chaidari	Thrakomakedones
	Soares 23'; Rusev 29'; Kontis 45'	Report		Stadium: AEK Athens' training complex Referee: 1,500

6 August 2004 Friendly	Marko	1–2	AEK Athens	Markopoulo
18:30 EEST (UTC+3)	Zaradoukas 74'	Report	Rusev 63' (pen.); Kampantais 81'	Stadium: Municipal Markopoulo Stadium; Attendance: 3,000

11 August 2004 Friendly	Mantova	2–0	AEK Athens	Verona
21:30 EEST (UTC+3)	Hübner (penalty missed) 54', (penalty missed) 88', 89'; Noselli 54'	Report		Stadium: Centro Sportivo Veronello

14 August 2004 Troffeo Sky	Internazionale	5–1	AEK Athens	Pisa
21:45 EEST (UTC+3)	Stanković 11', 45'; Materazzi 40'; Mihajlović 47'; Cruz 69'	Report	Soares 53'	Stadium: Arena Garibaldi; Referee: Matteo Trefoloni (Italy)

18 August 2004 Friendly	AEK Athens	2–3	Al Shabab	Verona
19:00 EEST (UTC+3)	Kontis (yellow card); Amponsah (yellow card); Liberopoulos (penalty missed) 19'; Petkov 39'; Konstantinidis 87'	Report	Salem 44'; Geraldo 53' (pen.); Da Silva 81'	Stadium: Centro Sportivo Veronello; Referee: Soraorni (Italy)

21 August 2004 Friendly	Brescia	1–2	AEK Athens	Ospitaletto
19:00 EEST (UTC+3)	Bachini 3' (pen.); Caracciolo 47' (pen.)	Report	Liberopoulos 78'	Stadium: Stadio Comunale Ospitaletto; Referee: Mario Mazzoleni (Italy)

27 August 2004 Friendly	Apollon Limassol	3–3	AEK Athens	Limassol
20:00 EEST (UTC+3)	Sosin 25', 60' (pen.); Pittas 78'	Report (page 10)	Soares 22'; Liberopoulos 47'; Katsouranis 80' (pen.)	Stadium: Tsirio Stadium; Referee: Kostas Theodotou (Cyprus)

29 August 2004 Friendly	Anorthosis	0–4	AEK Athens	Larnaca
		Report	Krassas 15'; Petkov 20'; Kampantais 49'; Soares 58'	Stadium: Antonis Papadopoulos Stadium

4 September 2004 Trofeo Hellboy	Deportivo La Coruña	1–1 (2–4 p)	AEK Athens	Madrid
23:00 EEST (UTC+3)	Munitis 7'	Report	Soares 45'	Stadium: Vicente Calderón Stadium; Attendance: 4,000; Referee: Victor José Esquinas Torres (Spain)
	Penalties
	Tristán (penalty missed); Capdevila (penalty missed); Munitis (penalty scored); Changui (penalty scored); Duscher (penalty missed)		(penalty scored) Bruno Alves; (penalty scored) Kontis; (penalty scored) Soares; (penalty missed) Kampantais; (penalty scored) Liberopoulos
Note: 45-minute match.

5 September 2004 Trofeo Hellboy	Atlético Madrid	0–0 (3–2 p)	AEK Athens	Madrid
1:00 EEST (UTC+3)		Report	Kostenoglou (yellow card)	Stadium: Vicente Calderón Stadium; Attendance: 4,000; Referee: Victor José Esquinas Torres (Spain)
	Penalties
	Luccin (penalty scored); Sergi (penalty scored); Jorge (penalty scored); Musampa (penalty missed); Simeone (penalty missed)		(penalty missed) Bruno Alves; (penalty scored) Kontis; (penalty missed) Soares; (penalty scored) Kampantais; (penalty missed) Liberopoulos
Note: 45-minute match.

12 October 2004 Friendly	Galatasaray	2–1	AEK Athens	Istanbul
20:00 EEST (UTC+3)	Akman 62'; Uçar 66'	Report	Soares 41'	Stadium: Ali Sami Yen Stadi; Attendance: 7,000; Referee: Hüseyin Göçek (Turkey)

13 November 2004 Friendly	AEK Athens	0–0	Galatasaray	Marousi
19:00 EEST (UTC+3)		Report		Stadium: Olympic Stadium; Attendance: 13,399

== Competitions ==
=== Overall record ===
Competition	First match	Last match	Starting round	Final position	Record							
Competition	First match	Last match	Starting round	Final position	Pld	W	D	L	GF	GA	GD	Win %
Alpha Ethniki	19 September 2004	25 May 2005	Matchday 1	3rd	30	17	11	2	46	22	+24	56.67
Greek Cup	11 September 2004	27 April 2005	First round	Semi-finals	10	5	3	2	17	8	+9	50.00
UEFA Cup	16 September 2004	15 December 2004	First round	Group stage	6	1	1	4	6	13	−7	16.67
Total					46	23	15	8	69	43	+26	50.00

Last updated: 25 May 2005
Source: Competitions

=== Alpha Ethniki ===
==== League table ====
Pos	Team	Pld	W	D	L	GF	GA	GD	Pts	Qualification or relegation
1	Olympiacos (Note: Olympiacos and Panionios originally had three points deducted for the incidents before their match in the round 16 but these deductions were cancelled on appeal.) (C)	30	19	8	3	54	18	+36	65	Qualification for Champions League group stage
2	Panathinaikos	30	19	7	4	51	18	+33	64	Qualification for Champions League third qualifying round
3	AEK Athens	30	17	11	2	46	22	+24	62	Qualification for UEFA Cup first round
4	Skoda Xanthi	30	14	8	8	43	29	+14	50	Qualification for UEFA Cup first round
5	PAOK	30	13	7	10	43	39	+4	46	Qualification for UEFA Cup first round

Source: Galanis Sports Data
Rules for classification: 1st points; 2nd head-to-head points; 3rd head-to-head goal difference; 4th decision match.
(C) Champions

==== Results summary ====
Overall								Home						Away					
Pld	W	D	L	GF	GA	GD	Pts	W	D	L	GF	GA	GD	W	D	L	GF	GA	GD
30	17	11	2	46	22	+24	62	12	2	1	25	5	+20	5	9	1	21	17	+4

Source: Competitive matches

==== Results by Matchday ====
Round	1	2	3	4	5	6	7	8	9	10	11	12	13	14	15	16	17	18	19	20	21	22	23	24	25	26	27	28	29	30
Ground	A	H	H	A	H	A	H	A	H	A	A	H	A	H	A	H	A	A	H	A	H	A	H	A	H	H	A	H	A	H
Result	D	W	W	W	W	D	D	W	W	D	D	D	W	W	L	W	D	D	W	W	W	D	W	D	W	W	W	L	D	W
Position	8	4	2	2	1	1	2	2	1	2	3	3	3	2	3	3	2	3	3	3	3	3	2	3	2	2	2	3	3	3

Updated to match(es) played on 25 May 2005. Source: Competitive matches
A = Away; H = Home; W = Win; D = Draw; L = Loss; P = Postponed

==== Matches ====
19 September 2004 1	Egaleo	1–1	AEK Athens	Egaleo
19:00 EEST (UTC+3)	Fotakis 57'; Psomas (yellow card) 90+6'		Amponsah (yellow card) 37'; Liberopoulos 59'; Katsouranis (yellow card) 82'	Stadium: Stavros Mavrothalassitis Stadium; Attendance: 2,969; Referee: Fragiskos Somarakakis (Athens)

26 September 2004 2	AEK Athens	2–0	Kerkyra	Rizoupoli
21:00 EEST (UTC+3)	Rusev 8'; Kontis (yellow card) 79'; Kampantais 89'		Amanatidis (yellow card) 45'; Garozis (yellow card) 61'; Sfakianakis (yellow card) 81'; Koltzos (yellow card) 85'; N'Diaye (yellow card) 90+1'	Stadium: Georgios Kamaras Stadium; Attendance: 11,136; Referee: Avraam Kebaridis (Thessaloniki)

3 October 2004 3	AEK Athens	2–0	Panionios	Rizoupoli
21:00 EEST (UTC+3)	Katsouranis (yellow card) 23'; Soares 48', 90+1', (yellow card) 75'; Kostenoglou (yellow card) 62'; Liberopoulos (penalty missed) 70'; Amponsah (yellow card) 83'		Vlček (yellow card) 3'; Drobný (yellow card) 45'; Parodi (yellow card) 47'; Lagonikakis (yellow card) 71'	Stadium: Georgios Kamaras Stadium; Attendance: 11,820; Referee: Christoforos Zografos (Athens)

17 October 2004 4	Iraklis	1–2	AEK Athens	Thessaloniki
20:00 EEST (UTC+3)	Katsabis (yellow card) 19'; Keita (yellow card) 44', (goal) 44'; Nebegleras (yellow card) 51'; Ioannou (yellow card) 59'		Krassas (yellow card) 11'; Soares (yellow card) 31', (goal) 90+1'; Alves (yellow card) 68'; Kontis (yellow card) 83'; Katsouranis 85' (pen.), (yellow card) 87'	Stadium: Kaftanzoglio Stadium; Attendance: 10,100; Referee: Giorgos Douros (Corinthia)

24 October 2004 5	AEK Athens	4–1	Kallithea	Marousi
20:30 EEST (UTC+3)	Assunção (yellow card) 12'; Liberopoulos 18', 72', (yellow card) 45+1'; Soares 60', 67'		Sheta (yellow card) 33'; Kyriakos 66'	Stadium: Olympic Stadium; Attendance: 27,325; Referee: Dimitris Takidis (Kilkis)

31 October 2004 6	Aris	1–1	AEK Athens	Thessaloniki
19:00 EET (UTC+2)	Sanjurjo 10'; Murawski (yellow card) 34'; Papadopoulos (yellow card) 40'; Chrysafis (yellow card) 45+1'; Gogolos (yellow card) 56'		Tziortziopoulos (yellow card) 14'; Soares 61'	Stadium: Kleanthis Vikelidis Stadium; Attendance: 10,900; Referee: Iraklis Tsikinis (Messinia)

7 November 2004 7	AEK Athens	0–0	Olympiacos	Marousi
19:30 EET (UTC+2)	Assunção (yellow card) 40'; Kostenoglou (yellow card) 75'; Kontis (yellow card) 90+2'		Marić (yellow card) 41'	Stadium: Olympic Stadium; Attendance: 63,129; Referee: Giorgos Douros (Corinthia)

21 November 2004 8	Ergotelis	0–1	AEK Athens	Heraklion
17:00 EET (UTC+2)	Dimitris (yellow card) 27'; Oikonomakis (yellow card) 32'; Pârvu (yellow card) 45+1'; Argyrakis (red card) 81'; Soutzis (yellow card) 90+1'; Sylla (yellow card) 90+4'		Tziortziopoulos (yellow card) 55'; Soares (yellow card) 58'; Kampantais (yellow card) 62'; Katsouranis 74'; Krassas (yellow card) 90+2'	Stadium: Pankritio Stadium; Attendance: 16,850; Referee: Dimitris Kalopoulos (Thessaloniki)

28 November 2004 9	AEK Athens	1–0	Chalkidona	Marousi
19:00 EET (UTC+2)	Soares 20'; Krassas (yellow card) 74'		Korakakis (yellow card) 55'	Stadium: Olympic Stadium; Attendance: 21,877; Referee: Giorgos Kasnaferis (Argolida)

5 December 2004 10	PAOK	1–1	AEK Athens	Thessaloniki
17:00 EET (UTC+2)	Zisopoulos (yellow card) 29'; Feutchine 80'		Tziortziopoulos (yellow card) 47'; Krassas 57'; Alves (yellow card) 62'	Stadium: Toumba Stadium; Attendance: 9,568; Referee: Giannis Tsachilidis (Piraeus)

11 December 2004 11	Skoda Xanthi	1–1	AEK Athens	Xanthi
16:45 EET (UTC+2)	Luciano 46'; Torosidis (yellow card) 71'		Kampantais 72'; Konstantinidis (yellow card) 88'; Alves (yellow card) 90'; Liberopoulos (yellow card) 90+1'	Stadium: Skoda Xanthi Arena; Attendance: 5,383; Referee: Avraam Kebaridis (Thessaloniki)

19 December 2004 12	AEK Athens	1–1	OFI	Marousi
19:00 EET (UTC+2)	Assunção (yellow card) 48'; Katsouranis 74'; Liberopoulos (yellow card) 84'		Nwafor 36', (yellow card) 69'; Koutsoures (yellow card) 61'; Kolitsidakis (yellow card) 90+5'	Stadium: Olympic Stadium; Attendance: 10,458; Referee: Thanasis Briakos (Epirus)

29 December 2004 13	Ionikos	2–3	AEK Athens	Nikaia
17:00 EET (UTC+2)	Makor 18', 57'; Mangos (yellow card) 40'; Vourexakis (yellow card) 49'; Beqaj (yellow card) 71'		Moras (yellow card) 11'; Soares 14'; Rusev (yellow card) 27'; Katsouranis 38'; Kontis 70'	Stadium: Neapolis Municipal Stadium; Attendance: 1,925; Referee: Gerasimos Mazarakis (Kefalonia)

9 January 2005 14	AEK Athens	1–0	Panathinaikos	Marousi
19:30 EET (UTC+2)	Papadopoulos (yellow card) 32'; González (yellow card) 52'; Basinas (yellow card) 71'		Liberopoulos (yellow card) 11'	Stadium: Olympic Stadium; Attendance: 44,193; Referee: Kyros Vassaras (Thessaloniki)

15 January 2005 15	Apollon Kalamarias	2–1	AEK Athens	Thessaloniki
17:45 EET (UTC+2)	Spyropoulos 15'; Cleyton 31' (pen.), (yellow card) 34'; Genitsaridis (yellow card) 52'		Alves (yellow card) 39'; Assunção (yellow card) 63'; Ivić 78'; Bourbos (yellow card) 88'	Stadium: Kalamaria Stadium; Attendance: 1,695; Referee: Vasilis Terovitsas (Aetoloacarnania)

23 January 2005 16	AEK Athens	1–0	Egaleo	Marousi
19:00 EET (UTC+2)	Katsouranis (yellow card) 43', (goal) 50'		Chloros (yellow card) 34'; Papoutsis (yellow card) 47'; Fotakis (yellow card) 68'	Stadium: Olympic Stadium; Attendance: 21,230; Referee: Kyros Vassaras (Thessaloniki)

30 January 2005 17	Kerkyra	2–2	AEK Athens	Corfu
17:00 EET (UTC+2)	Fofonka 8'; N'Diaye (yellow card) 33'; Niniadis 63'; Gittas (yellow card) 76'; Koltzos (yellow card) 90+1' (yellow-red card) 90+1'		Syros 2' (o.g.); Toskas (yellow card) 29'; Soares (yellow card) 41'; Ivić 58'; Malbasa (yellow card) 79'	Stadium: Kerkyra Stadium; Attendance: 2,642; Referee: Giannis Spyropoulos (Phthiotis)

13 February 2005 18	Panionios	1–1	AEK Athens	Nea Smyrni
19:00 EET (UTC+2)	Kiassos 8'; Salihi (yellow card) 18'		Bourbos (yellow card) 7'; Moras (yellow card) 22'; Katsouranis 58'	Stadium: Nea Smyrni Stadium; Attendance: 834; Referee: Dimitris Styliaras (Aetoloacarnania)

19 February 2005 19	AEK Athens	2–1	Iraklis	Marousi
19:30 EET (UTC+2)	Kontis (yellow card) 40'; Katsouranis (yellow card) 63', (goal) 71', 78'; Soares (yellow card) 80'		Kapetanos (yellow card) 40'; Fortuzi 47'; Abaris (yellow card) 56'; Seghiri (yellow card) 70'; Papazacharias (yellow card) 77'	Stadium: Olympic Stadium; Attendance: 18,859; Referee: Vasilis Terovitsas (Aetoloacarnania)

26 February 2005 20	Kallithea	1–2	AEK Athens	Kallithea
19:30 EET (UTC+2)	Kyriakos 68'; Dragićević (yellow card) 72'; Vokolos (yellow card) 75'; Tsigas (yellow card) 84'		César 2'; Ivić 8'; Alves (yellow card) 81'	Stadium: Grigoris Lambrakis Stadium; Attendance: 2,439; Referee: Charalampos Karatzas (Euboea)

6 March 2005 21	AEK Athens	1–0	Aris	Marousi
17:30 EET (UTC+2)	César (yellow card) 62'; Bourbos (yellow card) 65'; Liberopoulos 74'; Malbasa (yellow card) 89'		Murawski (yellow card) 27'; Kouemaha (yellow card) 33'; Lazanas (yellow card) 60'	Stadium: Olympic Stadium; Attendance: 23,213; Referee: Vasilis Terovitsas (Aetoloacarnania)

13 March 2005 22	Olympiacos	1–1	AEK Athens	Piraeus
20:00 EET (UTC+2)	Schürrer (yellow card) 16'; Okkas 19'; Marić (yellow card) 29'; Stoltidis (yellow card) 56'; Mavrogenidis (yellow card) 81'; Anatolakis (yellow card) 85'		Alves (yellow card) 27'; Katsouranis 71' (pen.); Assunção (yellow card) 57'; Liberopoulos (yellow card) 90'	Stadium: Karaiskakis Stadium; Attendance: Behind closed doors Referee: Giorgos Kasnaferis (Argolida)

20 March 2005 23	AEK Athens	3–0	Ergotelis	Marousi
15:30 EET (UTC+2)	Petkov (yellow card) 16', (goal) 37'; Liberopoulos 49', 55'		Argyrakis (yellow card) 35'; Fileković (yellow card) 39'	Stadium: Olympic Stadium; Attendance: 30,273; Referee: Christos Vasileiou (Thessaly)

2 April 2005 24	Chalkidona	1–1	AEK Athens	Nikaia
17:45 EEST (UTC+3)	Koutsis (yellow card) 7'; Iliopoulos 15' (pen.); Geladaris (yellow card) 17'; Al Zaher (yellow card) 20'; Pappas (yellow card) 38'; Sotirhos (yellow card) 55' (yellow-red card) 90+1'; Koutsokostas (yellow card) 82'		Chiotis (yellow card) 14'; Katsouranis 67'; Kontis (yellow card) 88'	Stadium: Nikaia Municipal Stadium; Attendance: 2,972; Referee: Thanasis Briakos (Epirus)

10 April 2005 25	AEK Athens	2–0	PAOK	Marousi
19:30 EEST (UTC+3)	Chiotis (yellow card) 3'; Liberopoulos (red card) 28'; Soares 37', 58'; Assunção (yellow card) 54'; Petkov (yellow card) 62'		Salpingidis (penalty missed) 4'; Zografakis (red card) 28'; Andralas (yellow card) 44'	Stadium: Olympic Stadium; Attendance: 35,994; Referee: Charalampos Karatzas (Euboea)

17 April 2005 26	AEK Athens	2–1	Skoda Xanthi	Marousi
18:15 EEST (UTC+3)	Moras (yellow card) 16'; Soares 19'; Ivić (yellow card) 44'; Katsouranis (penalty missed) 45+1', (yellow card) 50'; César 46'; Alves (yellow card) 86'		Torosidis (yellow card) 18'; Luciano 39' (pen.); Labriakos (yellow card) 45+2'; Papadimitriou (yellow card) 75'	Stadium: Olympic Stadium; Attendance: 31,525; Referee: Iraklis Tsikinis (Messinia)

24 April 2005 27	OFI	2–3	AEK Athens	Heraklion
20:00 EEST (UTC+3)	Arvanitis (yellow card) 47'; Pitsos (yellow card) 54'; Machlas 71'; Kazantzis 89'		Ivić 59'; César 69'; Liberopoulos 90+4'	Stadium: Pankritio Stadium; Attendance: 5,537; Referee: Vasilis Terovitsas (Aetoloacarnania)

8 May 2005 28	AEK Athens	0–1	Ionikos	Marousi
19:00 EEST (UTC+3)	Krassas 55'		Tsiblidis (yellow card) 31'; Natsouras (yellow card) 54', (goal) 87'; Makor (yellow card) 85'	Stadium: Olympic Stadium; Attendance: 41,331; Referee: Spyros Vasileiou (Elis)

15 May 2005 29	Panathinaikos	0–0	AEK Athens	Ampelokipoi
18:45 EEST (UTC+3)	Kotsios (yellow card) 45'; González (yellow card) 58'		Assunção (yellow card) 33'; Kontis (yellow card) 62'	Stadium: Leoforos Alexandras Stadium; Attendance: Behind closed doors Referee: Kyros Vassaras (Thessaloniki)

25 May 2005 30	AEK Athens	3–0	Apollon Kalamarias	Marousi
18:30 EEST (UTC+3)	César 71'; Petkov (yellow card) 77'; Krassas 81'; Liberopoulos 85'		Papadopoulos (yellow card) 74'	Stadium: Olympic Stadium; Attendance: 18,327; Referee: Michael Koukoulakis (Heraklion)

=== Greek Cup ===
==== First round ====
11 September 2004 First leg	PANO Malia	1–1	AEK Athens	Chania
17:00 EEST (UTC+3)	Katsoulis (yellow card) 60'; Dermitzakis 85'	Report	Soares 7'	Stadium: Perivolia Municipal Stadium; Attendance: 3,000; Referee: Antonis Kouklakis (Chania)

6 October 2004 Second leg	AEK Athens	2–1 (3–2 agg.)	PANO Malia	Rizoupoli
16:00 EEST (UTC+3)	Kampantais 66'; Petkov 89'	Report	Katsoulis (yellow card) 57'; Ieronimakis (yellow card) 63'; Tsafantakis 78'; Marris (red card) 89'	Stadium: Georgios Kamaras Stadium; Attendance: 1,120; Referee: Vasilis Terovitsas (Aetoloacarnania)

==== Round of 32 ====
22 December 2004 First leg	AEK Athens	3–0	Agios Dimitrios	Marousi
15:00 EET (UTC+2)	Alves 74'; Konstantinidis 75', 90+2'	Report		Stadium: Olympic Stadium; Attendance: 763; Referee: Michael Koukoulakis (Heraklion)

11 January 2005 Second leg	Agios Dimitrios	1–4 (1–7 agg.)	AEK Athens	Agios Dimitrios
19:00 EET (UTC+2)	Buyse (yellow card); Kontopoulos (yellow card); Rosales 5' (pen.)	Report	Soares 42'; Kampantais 64'; Bourbos 78'; Moras 85'	Stadium: Agios Dimitrios Municipal Stadium; Attendance: 2,000; Referee: Antonis Kouklakis (Chania)

==== Round of 16 ====
27 January 2005 First leg	AEK Athens	1–1	Panathinaikos	Marousi
19:00 EET (UTC+2)	Ivić (yellow card) 37'; Alves (yellow card) 58'; Liberopoulos 90+4'	Report	Konstantinou (yellow card) 25', (goal) 47'; González (yellow card) 79'; Goumas (yellow card) 86'	Stadium: Olympic Stadium; Attendance: 17,280; Referee: Iraklis Tsikinis (Messinia)

3 February 2005 Second leg	Panathinaikos	1–3 (2–4 agg.)	AEK Athens	Ampelokipoi
19:00 EET (UTC+2)	Goumas (yellow card) 6'; Basinas (yellow card) 8'; Konstantinou (yellow card) 45+1', (goal) 51'; Vyntra (yellow card) 47'	Report	Katsouranis 7' (pen.), (yellow card) 23'; Rusev (yellow card) 8'; Soares (yellow card) 45+3', (goal) 55'; Kontis (yellow card) 44'; Liberopoulos (yellow card) 75'; Ivić 77'	Stadium: Leoforos Alexandras Stadium; Attendance: 5,153; Referee: Vasilis Terovitsas (Aetoloacarnania)

==== Quarter-finals ====
2 March 2005 First leg	Panionios	0–0	AEK Athens	Nea Smyrni
19:00 EET (UTC+2)		Report	Katsouranis (yellow card) 62'	Stadium: Nea Smyrni Stadium; Attendance: 3,000; Referee: Giorgos Kasnaferis (Argolida)

16 March 2005 Second leg	AEK Athens	2–0 (2–0 agg.)	Panionios	Marousi
19:00 EET (UTC+2)	César 10'; Liberopoulos 23', (yellow card) 65'; Assunção (yellow card) 85'	Report	Maniatis (yellow card) 56'	Stadium: Olympic Stadium; Attendance: 8,000; Referee: Kyros Vassaras (Thessaloniki)

==== Semi-finals ====
20 April 2005 First leg	AEK Athens	0–1	Olympiacos	Marousi
19:00 EEST (UTC+3)	Petkov (yellow card) 42'; Malbaša (yellow card) 81'	Report	Đorđević 8'; Pantos (yellow card) 33'; Anatolakis (yellow card) 40'; Mavrogenidis (yellow card) 73'; Giovanni (yellow card) 90+3'	Stadium: Olympic Stadium; Attendance: 29,851; Referee: Dimitris Takidis (Kilkis)
Note: AEK had five attempts hit the crossbar during the 2nd half, three of which in the same play.

27 April 2005 Second leg	Olympiacos	2–1 (a.e.t.) (3–1 agg.)	AEK Athens	Piraeus
19:00 EEST (UTC+3)	Castillo (yellow card) 60'; Moras 97' (o.g.); Đorđević (yellow card) 117'; Okkas 118'	Report	Ivić (yellow card) 16'; Petkov (yellow card) 23'; César (yellow card) 32' (yellow-red card) 55'; Liberopoulos 42'; Georgeas (yellow card) 43'; Soares (yellow card) 45'; Alves (yellow card) 71'; Assunção (yellow card) 94'	Stadium: Karaiskakis Stadium; Attendance: 27,441; Referee: Charalampos Karatzas (Euboea)

=== UEFA Cup ===
==== First round ====
16 September 2004 First leg	Gorica (Slovenia)	1–1	(Greece) AEK Athens	Nova Gorica, Slovenia
19:30 EEST (UTC+3)	Rodić 1'; Lungu (yellow card) 25'; Srebrnič (yellow card) 89'	Report	Toskas (yellow card) 37'; Katsouranis 41' (pen.), (yellow card) 77', (penalty missed) 90'; Alves (yellow card) 45'	Stadium: Sports Park; Attendance: 3,000; Referee: Carlos Megía Dávila (Spain)

30 September 2004 Second leg	AEK Athens (Greece)	1–0 (2–1 agg.)	(Slovenia) Gorica	Athens, Greece
21:30 EEST (UTC+3)	Assunção (yellow card) 49'; Soares 90', (yellow card) 90'	Report	Kršić (yellow card) 49'; Rodić (yellow card) 62'	Stadium: Georgios Kamaras Stadium; Attendance: 11,550; Referee: Pedro Proença (Portugal)

==== Group stage ====
Pos	Team	Pld	W	D	L	GF	GA	GD	Pts	Qualification	LIL	SEV	AAC	ZEN	AEK
1	(France) Lille	4	3	0	1	5	3	+2	9	Advance to knockout stage	—	1–0	—	2–1	—
2	(Spain) Sevilla	4	2	1	1	6	4	+2	7	Advance to knockout stage	—	—	2–0	—	3–2
3	(Germany) Alemannia Aachen	4	2	1	1	5	4	+1	7	Advance to knockout stage	1–0	—	—	2–2	—
4	(Russia) Zenit Saint Petersburg	4	1	2	1	9	6	+3	5		—	1–1	—	—	5–1
5	(Greece) AEK Athens	4	0	0	4	4	12	−8	0		1–2	—	0–2	—	—

Source: RSSSF

===== Matches =====
21 October 2004 1	Zenit Saint Petersburg (Russia)	5–1	(Greece) AEK Athens	Saint Petersburg, Russia
19:00 EEST (UTC+3)	Arshavin 44'; Kerzhakov 48', 54', 78'; Denisov 86'	Report	Krassas 3'; Katsouranis (yellow card) 50'; Alves (yellow card) 65'	Stadium: Petrovsky Stadium; Attendance: 29,500; Referee: Antonio Costa (Portugal)

25 November 2004 2	AEK Athens (Greece)	1–2	(France) Lille	Athens, Greece
20:00 EET (UTC+2)	Amponsah (yellow card) 28', (goal) 72'; Alves (yellow card) 37'	Report	Vitakić 26'; Angbwa (yellow card) 55'; Debuchy 63'	Stadium: Olympic Stadium; Attendance: 22,015; Referee: Bernhard Brugger (Austria)

2 December 2004 3	Sevilla (Spain)	3–2	(Greece) AEK Athens	Seville, Spain
20:45 EET (UTC+2)	Baptista 19', 89' (pen.); Antoñito 29'; Navarro (yellow card) 38'	Report	Amponsah (yellow card) 7'; Liberopoulos 10'; Tziortziopoulos (yellow card) 34', (goal) 47'; Georgeas (yellow card) 35'	Stadium: Ramón Sánchez Pizjuán Stadium; Attendance: 30,000; Referee: Eric Braamhaar (Netherlands)

15 December 2004 4	AEK Athens (Greece)	0–2	(Germany) Alemannia Aachen	Athens, Greece
20:45 EET (UTC+2)	Toskas (yellow card) 28'	Report	Fiél (yellow card) 18'; Blank (yellow card) 29'; Sichone (yellow card) 47'; Meijer 57'; Gomez 84'	Stadium: Olympic Stadium; Attendance: 3,000; Referee: Serhiy Shebek (Ukraine)

== Statistics ==
=== Squad statistics ===
As of 25 May 2005

No.	Pos	Player	Alpha Ethniki		Greek Cup		UEFA Cup		Total	
No.	Pos	Player	Apps	Goals	Apps	Goals	Apps	Goals	Apps	Goals
Goalkeepers
1	GK	(Greece) Chrysostomos Michailidis	13	0	4	0	4	0	21	0
12	GK	(Greece) Giannis Arabatzis	0	0	0	0	0	0	0	0
22	GK	(Greece) Dionysis Chiotis	18	0	6	0	2	0	26	0
Defenders
3	DF	(Serbia and Montenegro) Nikola Malbaša	13	0	4	0	0	0	17	0
4	DF	(Portugal) Bruno Alves	27	0	10	1	5	0	42	1
5	DF	(Greece) Nikos Kostenoglou	21	0	3	0	5	0	29	0
14	DF	(Greece) Stavros Tziortziopoulos	11	0	2	0	5	1	18	1
15	DF	(Greece) Dimitris Koutsikos	0	0	0	0	0	0	0	0
16	DF	(Greece) Nikolaos Georgeas	6	0	1	0	2	0	9	0
18	DF	(Greece) Vangelis Moras	19	0	8	1	2	0	29	1
24	DF	(Greece) Christos Kontis	25	1	8	0	4	0	37	1
27	DF	(Greece) Panagiotis Stergiatos	0	0	0	0	0	0	0	0
39	DF	(Greece) Grigoris Toskas	6	0	3	0	3	0	12	0
Midfielders
8	MF	(Bulgaria) Ivan Rusev	9	1	3	0	2	0	14	1
9	MF	(Bulgaria) Milen Petkov	15	1	6	0	4	0	25	1
17	MF	(Serbia and Montenegro) Vladan Ivić	17	4	6	1	0	0	23	5
21	MF	(Greece) Kostas Katsouranis	28	10	7	1	6	1	41	12
26	MF	(Greece) Ilias Kyriakidis	11	0	5	0	0	0	16	0
28	MF	(Greece) Christos Bourbos	15	0	6	1	2	0	23	1
77	MF	(Brazil) Paulo Assunção	24	0	8	0	5	0	37	0
Forwards
7	FW	(Brazil) Alessandro Soares	25	11	9	3	5	1	39	15
10	FW	(Greece) Sotiris Konstantinidis	22	0	8	2	3	0	33	2
11	FW	(Greece) Leonidas Kampantais	11	2	3	2	4	0	18	4
20	FW	(Greece) Ilias Solakis	6	0	2	0	1	0	9	0
29	FW	(Sweden) Christos Christoforidis	1	0	1	0	0	0	2	0
30	FW	(Cyprus) Simos Krassas	24	2	6	0	6	1	36	3
33	FW	(Greece) Nikos Liberopoulos	28	9	9	3	6	1	43	13
44	FW	(Greece) Nikos Voulgaris	0	0	0	0	0	0	0	0
99	FW	(Brazil) Júlio César	13	4	6	1	0	0	19	5
—	FW	(Greece) Christos Kostis	0	0	0	0	0	0	0	0
Left during Winter Transfer Window
2	DF	(Greece) Stathis Kappos	0	0	1	0	0	0	1	0
6	DF	(Greece) Stelios Maistrellis	0	0	1	0	0	0	1	0
25	DF	(Ghana) Kofi Amponsah	5	0	1	0	4	1	10	1
19	MF	(Greece) Manolis Tsagarogiannakis	0	0	1	0	0	0	1	0
32	MF	(Greece) Christos Tsevas	0	0	2	0	1	0	3	0

=== Goalscorers ===
As of 25 May 2005
The list is sorted by competition order when total goals are equal, then by position and then by squad number.

Rank	No.	Pos.	Player	Alpha Ethniki	Greek Cup	UEFA Cup	Total
1	7	FW	(Brazil) Alessandro Soares	11	3	1	15
2	33	FW	(Greece) Nikos Liberopoulos	9	3	1	13
3	21	MF	(Greece) Kostas Katsouranis	10	1	1	12
4	17	MF	(Serbia and Montenegro) Vladan Ivić	4	1	0	5
4	99	FW	(Brazil) Júlio César	4	1	0	5
6	11	FW	(Greece) Leonidas Kampantais	2	2	0	4
7	30	FW	(Cyprus) Simos Krassas	2	0	1	3
8	10	FW	(Greece) Sotiris Konstantinidis	0	2	0	2
9	24	DF	(Greece) Christos Kontis	1	0	0	1
9	9	MF	(Bulgaria) Milen Petkov	1	0	0	1
9	8	MF	(Bulgaria) Ivan Rusev	1	0	0	1
9	4	DF	(Portugal) Bruno Alves	0	1	0	1
9	18	DF	(Greece) Vangelis Moras	0	1	0	1
9	28	MF	(Greece) Christos Bourbos	0	1	0	1
9	25	DF	(Ghana) Kofi Amponsah	0	0	1	1
9	14	DF	(Greece) Stavros Tziortziopoulos	0	0	1	1
Own goals				1	0	0	1
Totals				46	16	6	68

=== Assists ===
As of 25 May 2005
The list is sorted by competition order when total assists are equal, then by position and then by squad number.

Rank	No.	Pos.	Player	Alpha Ethniki	Greek Cup	UEFA Cup	Total
1	99	FW	(Brazil) Júlio César	4	0	0	4
1	33	FW	(Greece) Nikos Liberopoulos	4	0	0	4
3	9	MF	(Bulgaria) Milen Petkov	2	1	0	3
4	18	DF	(Greece) Vangelis Moras	2	0	0	2
4	77	MF	(Brazil) Paulo Assunção	2	0	0	2
4	28	MF	(Greece) Christos Bourbos	2	0	0	2
4	7	FW	(Brazil) Alessandro Soares	2	0	0	2
4	10	FW	(Greece) Sotiris Konstantinidis	2	0	0	2
4	30	FW	(Cyprus) Simos Krassas	2	0	0	2
11	22	GK	(Greece) Dionysis Chiotis	1	0	0	1
11	4	DF	(Portugal) Bruno Alves	1	0	0	1
11	25	DF	(Ghana) Kofi Amponsah	1	0	0	1
11	3	DF	(Serbia and Montenegro) Nikola Malbaša	1	0	0	1
11	21	MF	(Greece) Kostas Katsouranis	1	0	0	1
11	17	MF	(Serbia and Montenegro) Vladan Ivić	1	0	0	1
11	20	FW	(Greece) Ilias Solakis	1	0	0	1
Totals				29	1	0	30

=== Clean sheets ===
As of 25 May 2005
The list is sorted by competition order when total clean sheets are equal and then by squad number. Clean sheets in games where both goalkeepers participated are awarded to the goalkeeper who started the game. Goalkeepers with no appearances are not included.

Rank	No.	Player	Alpha Ethniki	Greek Cup	UEFA Cup	Total
1	22	(Greece) Dionysis Chiotis	7	1	0	8
2	1	(Greece) Chrysostomos Michailidis	5	2	1	8
Totals			12	3	1	16

=== Disciplinary record ===
As of 25 May 2005

N	P	Nat.	Name	Alpha Ethniki			Greek Cup			UEFA Cup			Total			Notes
N	P	Nat.	Name	Yellow card	Second yellow card	Red card	Yellow card	Second yellow card	Red card	Yellow card	Second yellow card	Red card	Yellow card	Second yellow card	Red card	Notes
Goalkeepers
1	GK	(Greece)	Chrysostomos Michailidis													
12	GK	(Greece)	Giannis Arabatzis													
22	GK	(Greece)	Dionysis Chiotis	2									2			
Defenders
3	DF	(Serbia and Montenegro)	Nikola Malbaša	3			1						4			
4	DF	(Portugal)	Bruno Alves	7			1			3			11			
5	DF	(Greece)	Nikos Kostenoglou	2									2			
14	DF	(Greece)	Stavros Tziortziopoulos	3						1			4			
15	DF	(Greece)	Dimitris Koutsikos													
16	DF	(Greece)	Nikolaos Georgeas				1			1			2			
18	DF	(Greece)	Vangelis Moras	3									3			
24	DF	(Greece)	Christos Kontis	6			1						7			
27	DF	(Greece)	Panagiotis Stergiatos													
39	DF	(Greece)	Grigoris Toskas	1						2			3			
Midfielders
8	MF	(Bulgaria)	Ivan Rusev	1			1						2			
9	MF	(Bulgaria)	Milen Petkov	3			2						5			
17	MF	(Serbia and Montenegro)	Vladan Ivić	1			2						3			
21	MF	(Greece)	Kostas Katsouranis	6			2			2			10			
26	MF	(Greece)	Ilias Kyriakidis													
28	MF	(Greece)	Christos Bourbos	3									3			
77	MF	(Brazil)	Paulo Assunção	8			3			1			12			
Forwards
7	FW	(Brazil)	Alessandro Soares	4			2			1			7			
10	FW	(Greece)	Sotiris Konstantinidis	1									1			
11	FW	(Greece)	Leonidas Kampantais	1									1			
20	FW	(Greece)	Ilias Solakis													
29	FW	(Sweden)	Christos Christoforidis													
30	FW	(Cyprus)	Simos Krassas	4									4			
33	FW	(Greece)	Nikos Liberopoulos	5		1	2						7		1	
44	FW	(Greece)	Nikos Voulgaris													
99	FW	(Brazil)	Júlio César	1			1	1					2	1		
—	FW	(Greece)	Christos Kostis													
Left during Winter Transfer window
2	DF	(Greece)	Stathis Kappos													
6	DF	(Greece)	Stelios Maistrellis													
25	DF	(Ghana)	Kofi Amponsah	2						2			4			
19	MF	(Greece)	Manolis Tsagarogiannakis													
32	MF	(Greece)	Christos Tsevas													

=== Starting 11 ===
N.	Formation	Matchday(s)
35	4–4–2	1–30
11	4–3–3

No.	Nat.	Player	Pos.
22	(Greece)	Dionysis Chiotis	GK
18	(Greece)	Vangelis Moras	RCB
4	(Portugal)	Bruno Alves	LCB
5	(Greece)	Nikos Kostenoglou	RB
24	(Greece)	Christos Kontis	LB
77	(Greece)	Paulo Assunção	DM
21	(Greece)	Kostas Katsouranis (C)	CM
30	(Cyprus)	Simos Krassas	RM
99	(Brazil)	Júlio César	LM
7	(Brazil)	Alessandro Soares	SS
33	(Greece)	Nikos Liberopoulos	CF

Last updated: 2005-05-25

=== UEFA rankings ===
UEFA team ranking

#	Form	Previous	Country	Team	Ranking
36		44	(Belgium)	Club Brugge	50.476
37		32	(Spain)	Deportivo Alavés	50.326
38		34	(Greece)	AEK Athens	47.715
39		38	(Belgium)	Anderlecht	47.476
40		54	(Greece)	Olympiacos	46.715

UEFA country ranking

#	Form	Previous	Country	League	Ranking
6		6	(Portugal)	Liga Sagres	44.666
7		8	(Netherlands)	Eredivisie	39.831
8		7	(Greece)	Alpha Ethniki	35.498
9		12	(Belgium)	Jupiler Pro League	31.750
10		11	(Scotland)	Clydesdale Bank Premier League	31.750

== Awards ==
Player	Pos.	Award	Source
(Greece) Kostas Katsouranis	MF	Greek Player of the Season	
(Portugal) Fernando Santos	—	Manager of the Season	
