= 2004–05 Lille OSC season =

Lille
2004–05 season
- President: Michel Seydoux
- Head coach: Claude Puel
- Stadium: Stade Grimonprez-Jooris
- Ligue 1: 2nd
- Coupe de France: Round of 16
- Coupe de la Ligue: Third round
- UEFA Intertoto Cup: Winners
- UEFA Cup: Round of 16
- Top goalscorer: League: Matt Moussilou (12); All: Matt Moussilou (22)
- Average home league attendance: 13,676
Home colours	Away colours

The 2004–05 season was the 60th season in the existence of Lille OSC and the club's fifth consecutive season in the top flight of French football. In addition to the domestic league, Lille participated in this season's editions of the Coupe de France, Coupe de la Ligue, the UEFA Intertoto Cup and UEFA Cup. The season covered the period from 1 July 2004 to 30 June 2005.

== Competitions ==
=== Overview ===
Competition	First match	Last match	Starting round	Final position	Record							
Competition	First match	Last match	Starting round	Final position	Pld	W	D	L	GF	GA	GD	Win %
Ligue 1	7 August 2004	28 May 2005	Matchday 1	2nd	38	18	13	7	52	29	+23	47.37
Coupe de France	7 January 2005	2 March 2005	Round of 64	Round of 16	3	2	0	1	6	6	+0	66.67
Coupe de la Ligue	10 November 2004	21 December 2004	Second round	Third round	2	1	1	0	4	3	+1	50.00
UEFA Intertoto Cup	17 July 2004	24 August 2004	Third round	Winners	6	3	3	0	10	4	+6	50.00
UEFA Cup	16 September 2004	17 March 2005	First round	Round of 16	10	5	3	2	11	6	+5	50.00
Total					59	29	20	10	83	48	+35	49.15

Source: Competitions

=== Ligue 1 ===
==== League table ====
Pos	Team	Pld	W	D	L	GF	GA	GD	Pts	Qualification or relegation
1	Lyon (C)	38	22	13	3	56	22	+34	79	Qualification to Champions League group stage
2	Lille	38	18	13	7	52	29	+23	67	Qualification to Champions League group stage
3	Monaco	38	15	18	5	52	35	+17	63	Qualification to Champions League third qualifying round
4	Rennes	38	15	10	13	49	42	+7	55	Qualification to UEFA Cup first round
5	Marseille	38	15	10	13	47	42	+5	55	Qualification to Intertoto Cup third round

Source: Ligue 1
Rules for classification: 1) points; 2) goal difference; 3) number of goals scored.
(C) Champions

==== Results summary ====
Overall								Home						Away					
Pld	W	D	L	GF	GA	GD	Pts	W	D	L	GF	GA	GD	W	D	L	GF	GA	GD
38	18	13	7	52	29	+23	67	11	6	2	31	11	+20	7	7	5	21	18	+3

==== Results by round ====
Round	1	2	3	4	5	6	7	8	9	10	11	12	13	14	15	16	17	18	19	20	21	22	23	24	25	26	27	28	29	30	31	32	33	34	35	36	37	38
Ground	H	A	H	A	H	H	A	H	A	H	A	H	A	H	A	H	A	H	A	H	A	H	A	A	H	A	H	A	H	A	H	A	H	A	H	A	H	A
Result	W	L	D	L	W	W	W	W	W	W	L	W	W	D	D	D	D	W	D	L	W	W	D	D	D	D	D	L	D	D	W	L	W	W	W	W	L	W
Position	1	12	13	13	13	8	3	2	1	2	2	2	2	2	2	2	2	2	2	2	2	2	2	2	2	3	3	3	3	4	2	3	2	2	2	2	2	2

A = Away; H = Home; W = Win; D = Draw; L = Loss

==== Matches ====
7 August 2004 1	Lille	2–0	Auxerre	Villeneuve d'Ascq
20:00	Brunel 42'; Dernis 46'			Stadium: Stadium Lille Métropole; Attendance: 12,013

15 August 2004 2	Marseille	3–0	Lille	Marseille
21:00	Bamogo 39'; Marlet 89'; Costa 90'			Stadium: Stade Vélodrome; Attendance: 55,689

21 August 2004 3	Lille	0–0	Bordeaux	Villeneuve d'Ascq
20:00				Stadium: Stadium Lille Métropole; Attendance: 10,841

28 August 2004 4	Lyon	1–0	Lille	Lyon
20:00	Frau 8'			Stadium: Stade de Gerland; Attendance: 34,107

11 September 2004 5	Lille	1–0	Nice	Villeneuve d'Ascq
20:00	Brunel 90'			Stadium: Stadium Lille Métropole; Attendance: 9,279

19 September 2004 6	Lille	2–0	Caen	Villeneuve d'Ascq
19:00	Ačimovič 24'; Brunel 88'			Stadium: Stadium Lille Métropole; Attendance: 10,428

22 September 2004 7	Sochaux	0–2	Lille	Montbéliard
20:30			Potillon 53' (o.g.); Brunel 90' (pen.)	Stadium: Stade Auguste Bonal; Attendance: 11,905

25 September 2004 8	Lille	4–0	Metz	Villeneuve d'Ascq
19:00	Ačimovič 17' (pen.); Moussilou 51', 71'; Audel 80'			Stadium: Stadium Lille Métropole; Attendance: 11,701

3 October 2004 9	Rennes	0–1	Lille	Rennes
18:00			Moussilou 65'	Stadium: Stade de la Route de Lorient; Attendance: 21,258

16 October 2004 10	Lille	2–1	Bastia	Villeneuve d'Ascq
20:00	Bodmer 4'; Dernis 83'		Ben Saada 21'	Stadium: Stadium Lille Métropole; Attendance: 13,102

24 October 2004 11	Toulouse	1–0	Lille	Toulouse
18:00	Eduardo 89'			Stadium: Stade du Toulouse; Attendance: 22,056

30 October 2004 12	Lille	1–0	Saint-Étienne	Villeneuve d'Ascq
20:00	Dumont 9'			Stadium: Stadium Lille Métropole; Attendance: 14,902

7 November 2004 13	Istres	0–2	Lille	Nîmes
18:00			Odemwingie 38'; Brunel 51' (pen.)	Stadium: Stade des Costières; Attendance: 6,745

14 November 2004 14	Lille	1–1	Monaco	Villeneuve d'Ascq
21:00	Landrin 43'		Chevantón 30'	Stadium: Stadium Lille Métropole; Attendance: 13,577

20 November 2004 15	Lens	1–1	Lille	Lens
17:15	Thomert 45'		Landrin 58'	Stadium: Stade Félix-Bollaert; Attendance: 38,828

28 November 2004 16	Lille	1–1	Strasbourg	Villeneuve d'Ascq
18:00	Odemwingie 84'		Niang 55'	Stadium: Stadium Lille Métropole; Attendance: 11,715

4 December 2004 17	Paris Saint-Germain	1–1	Lille	Paris
17:15	Reinaldo 34'		Bodmer 17'	Stadium: Parc des Princes; Attendance: 36,940

11 December 2004 18	Lille	2–1	Nantes	Villeneuve d'Ascq
20:00	Dernis 50'; Moussilou 52'		N'Zigou 33'	Stadium: Stadium Lille Métropole; Attendance: 13,856

18 December 2004 19	Ajaccio	0–0	Lille	Ajaccio
20:00				Stadium: Stade François Coty; Attendance: 2,112

11 January 2005 20	Lille	1–2	Marseille	Villeneuve d'Ascq
21:00	Brunel 53' (pen.)		Marlet 2'; Nasri 22'	Stadium: Stadium Lille Métropole; Attendance: 16,388

15 January 2005 21	Bordeaux	1–3	Lille	Bordeaux
20:00	Chamakh 85'		Debuchy 1'; Brunel 44'; Audel 80'	Stadium: Stade Chaban-Delmas; Attendance: 21,819

23 January 2005 22	Lille	2–1	Lyon	Villeneuve d'Ascq
21:00	Moussilou 3', 68'		Juninho Pernambucano 77' (pen.)	Stadium: Stadium Lille Métropole; Attendance: 14,899

26 January 2005 23	Nice	1–1	Lille	Nice
20:30	Cobos 90'		Ačimovič 38' (pen.)	Stadium: Stade du Ray; Attendance: 9,625

29 January 2005 24	Caen	0–0	Lille	Caen
20:00				Stadium: Stade Michel d'Ornano; Attendance: 18,295

5 February 2005 25	Lille	0–0	Sochaux	Villeneuve d'Ascq
17:15				Stadium: Stadium Lille Métropole; Attendance: 11,088

20 February 2005 26	Metz	1–1	Lille	Metz
18:00	Obraniak 50' (pen.)		Ačimovič 7'	Stadium: Stade Saint-Symphorien; Attendance: 14,698

27 February 2005 27	Lille	0–0	Rennes	Villeneuve d'Ascq
18:00				Stadium: Stadium Lille Métropole; Attendance: 12,014

5 March 2005 28	Bastia	3–1	Lille	Furiani
20:00	Hadji 22'; Ziani 29'; Rocchi 40'		Debuchy 19'	Stadium: Stade Armand Cesari; Attendance: 3,720

13 March 2005 29	Lille	1–1	Toulouse	Villeneuve d'Ascq
18:00	Odemwingie 61'		Moreira 75'	Stadium: Stadium Lille Métropole; Attendance: 12,820

20 March 2005 30	Saint-Étienne	0–0	Lille	Saint-Étienne
18:00				Stadium: Stade Geoffroy-Guichard; Attendance: 28,708

2 April 2005 31	Lille	8–0	Istres	Villeneuve d'Ascq
20:00	Moussilou 12', 16', 18', 56'; Bodmer 22'; Brunel 27', 60'; Thiam 66' (o.g.)			Stadium: Stadium Lille Métropole; Attendance: 14,756

16 April 2005 33	Lille	2–1	Lens	Villeneuve d'Ascq
17:15	Moussilou 39'; Fauvergue 89'		Leroy 43'	Stadium: Stadium Lille Métropole; Attendance: 16,178

23 April 2005 34	Strasbourg	1–2	Lille	Strasbourg
20:00	Niang 70'		Moussilou 34'; Dumont 63'	Stadium: Stade de la Meinau; Attendance: 15,920

1 May 2005 32	Monaco	2–0	Lille	Monaco
21:00	Squillaci 65'; Adebayor 90'			Stadium: Stade Louis II; Attendance: 11,594

7 May 2005 35	Lille	1–0	Paris Saint-Germain	Villeneuve d'Ascq
20:00	Mirallas 85'			Stadium: Stadium Lille Métropole; Attendance: 16,823

14 May 2005 36	Nantes	1–3	Lille	Nantes
17:15	Savinaud 19'		Dumont 9'; Schmitz 51'; Debuchy 73'	Stadium: Stade de la Beaujoire; Attendance: 31,456

21 May 2005 37	Lille	0–2	Ajaccio	Villeneuve d'Ascq
20:45			Ouadah 11'; Robin 71'	Stadium: Stadium Lille Métropole; Attendance: 16,891; Referee: Thierry Auriac

28 May 2005 38	Auxerre	1–3	Lille	Auxerre
20:00	Kalou 28'		Odemwingie 25'; Bodmer 48' (pen.); Moussilou 86'	Stadium: Stade de l'Abbé Deschamps; Attendance: 13,679; Referee: Gilles Veissière

=== Coupe de France ===
7 January 2005 Round of 64	Lille	2–1	Le Mans	Villeneuve d'Ascq
19:00	Ačimovič 20'; Brunel 81'		Boutabout 56'	Stadium: Stadium Lille Métropole; Attendance: 4,315; Referee: Gaël Lecellier

12 February 2005 Round of 32	Lille	3–2	Lens	Villeneuve d'Ascq
20:45	Brunel 58' (pen.); Bodmer 67'; Odemwingie 88'		Utaka 16'; Cousin 84'	Stadium: Stadium Lille Métropole; Attendance: 18,000; Referee: Pascal Garibian

2 March 2005 Round of 16	Lille	1–3 (a.e.t.)	Grenoble	Villeneuve d'Ascq
19:00	Fauvergue 32.'		Danic 47', 105'; Akrour 120'	Stadium: Stadium Lille Métropole; Attendance: 3,465; Referee: Stéphane Moulin

=== Coupe de la Ligue ===
10 November 2004 Second round	Lille	3–2 (a.e.t.)	Lyon	Villeneuve d'Ascq
19:00	Moussilou 56'; Dernis 110'; Dumont 120'		Abidal 89'; Ben Arfa 101' (pen.)	Stadium: Stadium Lille Métropole; Attendance: 15,015; Referee: Bertrand Layec

21 December 2004 Third round	Strasbourg	1–1 (a.e.t.) (4–2 p)	Lille	Strasbourg
21:00	Farnerud 71'		Makoun 46'	Stadium: Stade de la Meinau; Attendance: 7,844; Referee: Hervé Piccirillo

=== UEFA Cup ===
==== First round ====
16 September 2004 First leg	Shelbourne (Republic of Ireland)	2–2	(France) Lille	Dublin, Republic of Ireland
20:00	Fitzpatrick 80', 83'		Bodmer 20'; Landrin 45'	Stadium: Lansdowne Road

30 September 2004 Second leg	Lille (France)	2–0 (4–2 agg.)	(Republic of Ireland) Shelbourne	Villeneuve d'Ascq, France
19:30	Ačimovič 18'; Moussilou 27'			Stadium: Stadium Lille Métropole

==== Group stage ====
The group stage draw was held on 5 October 2004.

Pos	Team	Pld	W	D	L	GF	GA	GD	Pts	Qualification	LIL	SEV	AAC	ZEN	AEK
1	(France) Lille	4	3	0	1	5	3	+2	9	Advance to knockout stage	—	1–0	—	2–1	—
2	(Spain) Sevilla	4	2	1	1	6	4	+2	7	Advance to knockout stage	—	—	2–0	—	3–2
3	(Germany) Alemannia Aachen	4	2	1	1	5	4	+1	7	Advance to knockout stage	1–0	—	—	2–2	—
4	(Russia) Zenit Saint Petersburg	4	1	2	1	9	6	+3	5		—	1–1	—	—	5–1
5	(Greece) AEK Athens	4	0	0	4	4	12	−8	0		1–2	—	0–2	—	—

Source: RSSSF

21 October 2004 1	Alemannia Aachen (Germany)	1–0	(France) Lille	Cologne, Germany
18:15	Meijer 66'			Stadium: RheinEnergieStadion; Attendance: 20,350; Referee: Edo Trivković (Croatia)

4 November 2004 2	Lille (France)	2–1	(Russia) Zenit Saint Petersburg	Villeneuve d'Ascq, France
20:45	Tafforeau 34'; Moussilou 41'		Kerzhakov 38'	Stadium: Stadium Lille Métropole; Attendance: 9,100; Referee: Philippe Leuba (Switzerland)

25 November 2004 3	AEK Athens (Greece)	1–2	(France) Lille	Athens, Greece
20:00	Amponsah 72'		Vitakić 26'; Debuchy 63'	Stadium: Olympic Stadium; Attendance: 22,000

15 December 2004 4	Lille (France)	1–0	(Spain) Sevilla	Villeneuve d'Ascq, France
20:45	Moussilou 77'			Stadium: Stadium Lille Métropole; Attendance: 11,000

==== Knockout phase ====
===== Round of 32 =====
18 February 2005 First leg	Basel (Switzerland)	0–0	(France) Lille	Basel, Switzerland
20:30				Stadium: St. Jakob-Park; Attendance: 20,000

24 February 2005 Second leg	Lille (France)	2–0 (2–0 agg.)	(Switzerland) Basel	Villeneuve d'Ascq, France
21:00	Moussilou 37'; Ačimovič 78' (pen.)			Stadium: Stadium Lille Métropole; Attendance: 12,000

===== Round of 16 =====
10 March 2005 First leg	Lille (France)	0–1	(France) Auxerre	Villeneuve d'Ascq, France
20:30			Akalé 45'	Stadium: Stadium Lille Métropole; Attendance: 8,100

17 March 2005 Second leg	Auxerre (France)	0–0 (1–0 agg.)	(France) Lille	Auxerre, France
20:45				Stadium: Stade de l'Abbé-Deschamps; Attendance: 14,000
