= 2004–05 UEFA Cup group stage =

International football competition

The group stage of the 2004–05 UEFA Cup is the second stage of the competition proper. Group stage matches began on 21 October 2004 and concluded on 16 December 2004. The top three teams in each group progressed to the Round of 32, to be joined by the eight third-place finishers from the Champions League group stage.

== Teams ==
The group stage draw took place on 5 October 2004. The 40 teams were divided into five pots. Pot 1 comprised the top eight clubs in the team ranking. Pot 2 contained the following eight clubs in the rankings and likewise for Pots 3, 4 and 5. Each group contained one team from each pot. A team's seeding was determined by the UEFA coefficients.

Key to colours
Group winners, runners-up and third-placed teams advanced to round of 32

Pot 1
Team	Coeff.
(Italy) Lazio	83.531
(Italy) Parma	66.531
(Netherlands) Feyenoord	65.247
(England) Newcastle United	61.511
(Greece) AEK Athens	51.467
(Germany) VfB Stuttgart	47.331
(Belgium) Club Brugge	43.528
(Scotland) Rangers	42.600

Pot 2
Team	Coeff.
(Spain) Villarreal	42.350
(France) Auxerre	34.947
(Germany) Schalke 04	34.331
(Portugal) Sporting CP	33.969
(Spain) Zaragoza	33.350
(Turkey) Beşiktaş	32.656
(Portugal) Benfica	29.969
(France) Lille	27.947

Pot 3
Team	Coeff.
(Spain) Athletic Bilbao	26.350
(Spain) Sevilla	26.350
(Croatia) Dinamo Zagreb	25.733
(Switzerland) Basel	25.382
(France) Sochaux	24.947
(England) Middlesbrough	20.511
(Netherlands) Utrecht	20.247
(Austria) GAK	19.970

Pot 4
Team	Coeff.
(Serbia and Montenegro) Partizan	18.655
(Romania) Steaua București	17.881
(Scotland) Heart of Midlothian	17.600
(Netherlands) Heerenveen	17.247
(Germany) Alemannia Aachen	16.331
(Poland) Amica Wronki	16.176
(Greece) Panionios	15.467
(Ukraine) Dnipro Dnipropetrovsk	14.300

Pot 5
Team	Coeff.
(Hungary) Ferencváros	13.046
(Belgium) Standard Liège	12.528
(Greece) Egaleo	11.467
(Netherlands) AZ	11.247
(Russia) Zenit Saint Petersburg	9.572
(Belgium) Beveren	9.528
Austria Wien	8.970
(Georgia (country)) Dinamo Tbilisi	1.650

== Groups ==
Times are CET/CEST, (Note: CEST (UTC+2) for dates up to 30 October 2004 (matchday 1), and CET (UTC+1) for dates thereafter (matchdays 2–5).) as listed by UEFA.

=== Group A ===
Pos	Team	Pld	W	D	L	GF	GA	GD	Pts	Qualification	FEY	SCH	BSL	FER	HOM
1	(Netherlands) Feyenoord	4	2	1	1	6	3	+3	7	Advance to knockout stage	—	2–1	—	—	3–0
2	(Germany) Schalke 04	4	2	1	1	5	3	+2	7	Advance to knockout stage	—	—	1–1	2–0	—
3	(Switzerland) Basel	4	2	1	1	5	4	+1	7	Advance to knockout stage	1–0	—	—	—	1–2
4	(Hungary) Ferencváros	4	1	1	2	3	5	−2	4		1–1	—	1–2	—	—
5	(Scotland) Heart of Midlothian	4	1	0	3	2	6	−4	3		—	0–1	—	0–1	—

Source: RSSSF
21 October 2004
20:05

Feyenoord (Netherlands)	3–0	(Scotland) Heart of Midlothian
Kuyt 22', 83'; Goor 57'	Report

Feijenoord Stadion, Rotterdam
Attendance: 28,645
Referee: Tonny Kolbech Poulsen (Denmark)
21 October 2004
20:30

Schalke 04 (Germany)	1–1	(Switzerland) Basel
Kobiashvili 8'	Report	Delgado 82'

Arena AufSchalke, Gelsenkirchen
Attendance: 52,870
Referee: Johan Verbist (Belgium)

4 November 2004
20:30

Heart of Midlothian (Scotland)	0–1	(Germany) Schalke 04
	Report	Lincoln 73'

Murrayfield, Edinburgh
Attendance: 27,272
Referee: Nikolai Ivanov (Russia)
4 November 2004
20:45

Ferencváros (Hungary)	1–1	(Netherlands) Feyenoord
Tőzsér 27'	Report	Kalou 62'

Ferenc Puskás, Budapest
Attendance: 39,111
Referee: Darko Čeferin (Slovenia)

25 November 2004
18:15

Schalke 04 (Germany)	2–0	(Hungary) Ferencváros
Gyepes 16' (o.g.); Kobiashvili 40'	Report

Arena AufSchalke, Gelsenkirchen
Attendance: 51,179
Referee: Claude Colombo (France)
25 November 2004
20:15

Basel (Switzerland)	1–2	(Scotland) Heart of Midlothian
Carignano 77'	Report	Wyness 31'; Neilson 89'

St. Jakob-Park, Basel
Attendance: 21,645
Referee: Kristinn Jakobsson (Iceland)

1 December 2004
20:45

Ferencváros (Hungary)	1–2	(Switzerland) Basel
Rósa 22'	Report	Rossi 59'; Huggel 78'

Ferenc Puskás, Budapest
Attendance: 11,600
Referee: Vitaliy Godulyan (Ukraine)
1 December 2004
20:45

Feyenoord (Netherlands)	2–1	(Germany) Schalke 04
Kalou 32', 40'	Report	Hanke 6'

Feijenoord Stadion, Rotterdam
Attendance: 36,700
Referee: Matt Messias (England)

16 December 2004
20:45

Basel (Switzerland)	1–0	(Netherlands) Feyenoord
Carignano 53'	Report

St. Jakob-Park, Basel
Attendance: 26,876
Referee: Carlos Megía Dávila (Spain)
16 December 2004
20:45

Heart of Midlothian (Scotland)	0–1	(Hungary) Ferencváros
	Report	Rósa 30'

Murrayfield, Edinburgh
Attendance: 26,182
Referee: Levan Paniashvili (Georgia)

=== Group B ===
Pos	Team	Pld	W	D	L	GF	GA	GD	Pts	Qualification	ATH	STE	PAR	BJK	STD
1	(Spain) Athletic Bilbao	4	3	0	1	11	4	+7	9	Advance to knockout stage	—	1–0	2–0	—	—
2	(Romania) Steaua București	4	2	0	2	4	3	+1	6	Advance to knockout stage	—	—	—	2–1	2–0
3	(Italy) Parma	4	2	0	2	5	6	−1	6	Advance to knockout stage	—	1–0	—	3–2	—
4	(Turkey) Beşiktaş	4	1	1	2	7	7	0	4		3–1	—	—	—	1–1
5	(Belgium) Standard Liège	4	1	1	2	4	11	−7	4		1–7	—	2–1	—	—

Source: RSSSF
21 October 2004
19:15

Steaua București (Romania)	2–0	(Belgium) Standard Liège
Dragutinović 68' (o.g.); Neaga 81'	Report

Stadionul Steaua, Bucharest
Attendance: 12,728
Referee: Tomasz Mikulski (Poland)
21 October 2004
21:00

Athletic Bilbao (Spain)	2–0	(Italy) Parma
Gurpegi 8'; Del Horno 49'	Report

San Mamés Stadium, Bilbao
Attendance: 24,000
Referee: Zsolt Szabó (Hungary)

4 November 2004
19:00

Parma (Italy)	1–0	(Romania) Steaua București
Budel 80'	Report

Stadio Ennio Tardini, Parma
Attendance: 3,949
Referee: Ruud Bossen (Netherlands)
4 November 2004
19:30

Beşiktaş (Turkey)	3–1	(Spain) Athletic Bilbao
Güneş 26'; Carew 63'; Akın 89'	Report	Ezquerro 49'

BJK İnönü Stadium, Istanbul
Attendance: 20,250
Referee: Florian Meyer (Germany)

25 November 2004
19:15

Steaua București (Romania)	2–1	(Turkey) Beşiktaş
Neaga 3'; Ciocoiu 19'	Report	Akın 88'

Stadionul Steaua, Bucharest
Attendance: 12,100
Referee: Željko Širić (Croatia)
25 November 2004
19:30

Standard Liège (Belgium)	2–1	(Italy) Parma
Geraerts 54'; Michel 90+4'	Report	Pisanu 44'

Stade Maurice Dufrasne, Liège
Attendance: 22,123
Referee: Mark Halsey (England)

1 December 2004
20:45

Beşiktaş (Turkey)	1–1	(Belgium) Standard Liège
Buruk 30'	Report	Bangoura 81'

BJK İnönü Stadium, Istanbul
Attendance: 11,000
Referee: Pedro Proença (Portugal)
1 December 2004
20:45

Athletic Bilbao (Spain)	1–0	(Romania) Steaua București
Etxeberria 45'	Report

San Mamés Stadium, Bilbao
Attendance: 27,315
Referee: Georgios Kasnaferis (Greece)

16 December 2004
20:45

Standard Liège (Belgium)	1–7	(Spain) Athletic Bilbao
Onyewu 15'	Report	Ezquerro 6', 9', 54'; Yeste 35'; Iraola 58'; del Horno 63'; Etxeberria 71'

Stade Maurice Dufrasne, Liège
Attendance: 26,282
Referee: Martin Ingvarsson (Sweden)
16 December 2004
20:45

Parma (Italy)	3–2	(Turkey) Beşiktaş
Gilardino 17'; Cardone 36'; Degano 60'	Report	Buruk 6'; Metin 89'

Stadio Ennio Tardini, Parma
Attendance: 1,834
Referee: Laurent Duhamel (France)

=== Group C ===
Pos	Team	Pld	W	D	L	GF	GA	GD	Pts	Qualification	DNI	ZAR	AUS	BRU	UTR
1	(Ukraine) Dnipro Dnipropetrovsk	4	3	0	1	7	5	+2	9	Advance to knockout stage	—	—	1–0	3–2	—
2	(Spain) Zaragoza	4	2	1	1	5	3	+2	7	Advance to knockout stage	2–1	—	—	—	2–0
3	Austria Wien	4	2	1	1	4	3	+1	7	Advance to knockout stage	—	1–0	—	1–1	—
4	(Belgium) Club Brugge	4	1	2	1	5	5	0	5		—	1–1	—	—	1–0
5	(Netherlands) Utrecht	4	0	0	4	2	7	−5	0		1–2	—	1–2	—	—

Source: RSSSF
21 October 2004
18:30

Dnipro Dnipropetrovsk (Ukraine)	3–2	(Belgium) Club Brugge
Venhlynskyi 14', 62'; Rykun 45'	Report	Čeh 37'; Balaban 43'

Meteor Stadium, Dnipropetrovsk
Attendance: 18,000
Referee: Jaroslav Jára (Czech Republic)
21 October 2004
20:45

Zaragoza (Spain)	2–0	(Netherlands) Utrecht
Villa 77', 82'	Report

La Romareda, Zaragoza
Attendance: 13,000
Referee: Peter Sippel (Germany)

4 November 2004
19:15

Utrecht (Netherlands)	1–2	(Ukraine) Dnipro Dnipropetrovsk
Douglas 88'	Report	Rotan 11'; Semochko 83'

Stadion Galgenwaard, Utrecht
Attendance: 14,150
Referee: Costas Kapitanis (Cyprus)
4 November 2004
20:45

Austria Wien	1–0	(Spain) Zaragoza
Gilewicz 70'	Report

Ernst-Happel-Stadion, Vienna
Attendance: 18,800
Referee: Paolo Bertini (Italy)

25 November 2004
18:45

Dnipro Dnipropetrovsk (Ukraine)	1–0	Austria Wien
Nazarenko 19'	Report

Meteor Stadium, Dnipropetrovsk
Attendance: 17,052
Referee: Krzysztof Slupik (Poland)
25 November 2004
19:30

Club Brugge (Belgium)	1–0	(Netherlands) Utrecht
Lange 62'	Report

Jan Breydel Stadium, Bruges
Attendance: 21,561
Referee: Knud Erik Fisker (Denmark)

1 December 2004
20:45

Austria Wien	1–1	(Belgium) Club Brugge
Gilewicz 50'	Report	Lange 90'

Ernst-Happel-Stadion, Vienna
Attendance: 19,500
Referee: Rob Styles (England)
1 December 2004
20:45

Zaragoza (Spain)	2–1	(Ukraine) Dnipro Dnipropetrovsk
Sávio 9'; Generelo 73'	Report	Yezerskiy 2'

La Romareda, Zaragoza
Attendance: 9,315
Referee: Emil Božinovski (Macedonia)

16 December 2004
20:45

Club Brugge (Belgium)	1–1	(Spain) Zaragoza
Čeh 67'	Report	Sávio 39'

Jan Breydel Stadium, Bruges
Attendance: 20,690
Referee: Florian Meyer (Germany)
16 December 2004
20:45

Utrecht (Netherlands)	1–2	Austria Wien
Douglas 54'	Report	Sionko 14'; Rushfeldt 78'

Stadion Galgenwaard, Utrecht
Attendance: 13,320
Referee: Athanassios Briakos (Greece)

=== Group D ===
Pos	Team	Pld	W	D	L	GF	GA	GD	Pts	Qualification	NEW	SOC	SCP	PAN	DTB
1	(England) Newcastle United	4	3	1	0	8	1	+7	10	Advance to knockout stage	—	—	1–1	—	2–0
2	(France) Sochaux	4	3	0	1	4	4	0	9	Advance to knockout stage	0–4	—	—	1–0	—
3	(Portugal) Sporting CP	4	2	1	1	9	3	+6	7	Advance to knockout stage	—	0–1	—	4–1	—
4	(Greece) Panionios	4	1	0	3	6	8	−2	3		0–1	—	—	—	5–2
5	(Georgia (country)) Dinamo Tbilisi	4	0	0	4	2	13	−11	0		—	0–2	0–4	—	—

Source: RSSSF
21 October 2004
20:00

Dinamo Tbilisi (Georgia (country))	0–2	(France) Sochaux
	Report	Ilan 17'; Paisley 37'

Mikheil Meskhi Stadium, Tbilisi
Attendance: 18,000
Referee: Stefan Messner (Austria)
21 October 2004
20:30

Panionios (Greece)	0–1	(England) Newcastle United
	Report	Shearer 86'

Nea Smyrni Stadium, Athens
Attendance: 6,042
Referee: Roberto Rosetti (Italy)

4 November 2004
20:30

Newcastle United (England)	2–0	(Georgia (country)) Dinamo Tbilisi
Shearer 37'; Bellamy 56'	Report

St James' Park, Newcastle
Attendance: 27,218
Referee: Espen Berntsen (Norway)
4 November 2004
22:15

Sporting CP (Portugal)	4–1	(Greece) Panionios
Custódio 5'; Douala 38'; Liédson 79'; Viana 81'	Report	Marcora 35'

Estádio José Alvalade, Lisbon
Attendance: 19,000
Referee: Markus Nobs (Switzerland)

25 November 2004
17:00

Dinamo Tbilisi (Georgia (country))	0–4	(Portugal) Sporting CP
	Report	Liédson 6', 28', 59'; Viana 90'

Mikheil Meskhi Stadium, Tbilisi
Attendance: 7,000
Referee: Ceri Richards (Wales)
25 November 2004
20:45

Sochaux (France)	0–4	(England) Newcastle United
	Report	Bowyer 62'; Ameobi 46'; Bellamy 76'; Robert 90'

Stade Auguste Bonal, Montbéliard
Attendance: 15,713
Referee: Carlos Megía Dávila (Spain)

1 December 2004
20:45

Sporting CP (Portugal)	0–1	(France) Sochaux
	Report	Lonfat 2'

Estádio José Alvalade, Lisbon
Attendance: 21,349
Referee: Helmut Fleischer (Germany)
1 December 2004
20:45

Panionios (Greece)	5–2	(Georgia (country)) Dinamo Tbilisi
Mantzios 58', 67', 77'; Breška 90+2'; Marcora 90+3'	Report	Kakaladze 38'; Akhalaia 59'

Nea Smyrni Stadium, Athens
Attendance: 4,500
Referee: Alexandru Tudor (Romania)

16 December 2004
20:45

Sochaux (France)	1–0	(Greece) Panionios
Isabey 86'	Report

Stade Auguste Bonal, Montbéliard
Attendance: 10,479
Referee: Dick van Egmond (Netherlands)
16 December 2004
20:45

Newcastle United (England)	1–1	(Portugal) Sporting CP
Bellamy 5'	Report	Custódio 40'

St James' Park, Newcastle
Attendance: 28,017
Referee: Paul Allaerts (Belgium)

=== Group E ===
Pos	Team	Pld	W	D	L	GF	GA	GD	Pts	Qualification	MID	VIL	PTZ	LAZ	EGA
1	(England) Middlesbrough	4	3	0	1	6	2	+4	9	Advance to knockout stage	—	—	3–0	2–0	—
2	(Spain) Villarreal	4	2	2	0	8	2	+6	8	Advance to knockout stage	2–0	—	—	—	4–0
3	(Serbia and Montenegro) Partizan	4	1	2	1	7	6	+1	5	Advance to knockout stage	—	1–1	—	—	4–0
4	(Italy) Lazio	4	0	3	1	5	7	−2	3		—	1–1	2–2	—	—
5	(Greece) Egaleo	4	0	1	3	2	11	−9	1		0–1	—	—	2–2	—

Source: RSSSF
21 October 2004
18:15

Egaleo (Greece)	0–1	(England) Middlesbrough
	Report	Downing 78'

Georgios Kamaras Stadium, Athens
Attendance: 2,689
Referee: Attila Hanacsek (Hungary)
21 October 2004
21:00

Lazio (Italy)	1–1	(Spain) Villarreal
Rocchi 85'	Report	José Mari 4'

Stadio Olimpico, Rome
Attendance: 12,195
Referee: Michael Weiner (Germany)

4 November 2004
19:00

Partizan (Serbia and Montenegro)	4–0	(Greece) Egaleo
Christou 22' (o.g.); Ilić 55', 60'; Vukčević 68'	Report

Partizan Stadium, Belgrade
Attendance: 11,000
Referee: Paulo Costa (Portugal)
4 November 2004
21:00

Middlesbrough (England)	2–0	(Italy) Lazio
Zenden 16', 71'	Report

Riverside Stadium, Middlesbrough
Attendance: 33,991
Referee: Yuri Baskakov (Russia)

25 November 2004
21:00

Villarreal (Spain)	2–0	(England) Middlesbrough
Guayre 36'; Javi Venta 75'	Report

Estadio El Madrigal, Villarreal
Attendance: 10,326
Referee: Jan Wegereef (Netherlands)
25 November 2004
21:00

Lazio (Italy)	2–2	(Serbia and Montenegro) Partizan
Di Canio 52'; Inzaghi 73'	Report	Boya 6', 24'

Stadio Olimpico, Rome
Attendance: 11,566
Referee: Anton Stredak (Slovakia)

2 December 2004
20:45

Partizan (Serbia and Montenegro)	1–1	(Spain) Villarreal
Tomić 65' (pen.)	Report	Cazorla 17'

Partizan Stadium, Belgrade
Attendance: 18,950
Referee: Nicolai Vollquartz (Denmark)
2 December 2004
20:45

Egaleo (Greece)	2–2	(Italy) Lazio
Chloros 9'; Agritis 54'	Report	Muzzi 13', 36'

Georgios Kamaras Stadium, Athens
Attendance: 1,574
Referee: Bertrand Layec (France)

15 December 2004
20:45

Villarreal (Spain)	4–0	(Greece) Egaleo
Font 13'; Guayre 39'; Venta 52'; Cazorla 63'	Report

Estadio El Madrigal, Villarreal
Attendance: 9,534
Referee: Mike McCurry (Scotland)
15 December 2004
20:45

Middlesbrough (England)	3–0	(Serbia and Montenegro) Partizan
Németh 10'; Job 22'; Morrison 90'	Report

Riverside Stadium, Middlesbrough
Attendance: 20,856
Referee: Grzegorz Gilewski (Poland)

=== Group F ===
Pos	Team	Pld	W	D	L	GF	GA	GD	Pts	Qualification	AZ	AUX	GAK	RAN	AMC
1	(Netherlands) AZ	4	3	0	1	6	3	+3	9	Advance to knockout stage	—	2–0	—	1–0	—
2	(France) Auxerre	4	2	1	1	7	3	+4	7	Advance to knockout stage	—	—	0–0	—	5–1
3	(Austria) GAK	4	2	1	1	5	4	+1	7	Advance to knockout stage	2–0	—	—	—	3–1
4	(Scotland) Rangers	4	2	0	2	8	3	+5	6		—	0–2	3–0	—	—
5	(Poland) Amica Wronki	4	0	0	4	3	16	−13	0		1–3	—	—	0–5	—

Source: RSSSF
21 October 2004
20:30

Amica Wronki (Poland)	0–5	(Scotland) Rangers
	Report	Løvenkrands 18'; Novo 58'; Ricksen 70'; Arveladze 73' (pen.); Thompson 88'

Stadion Amica, Wronki
Attendance: 3,100
Referee: Julián Rodríguez Santiago (Spain)
21 October 2004
20:45

Auxerre (France)	0–0	(Austria) GAK
	Report

Stade de l'Abbé-Deschamps, Auxerre
Attendance: 3,772
Referee: Fernando Carmona Méndez (Spain)

4 November 2004
18:45

GAK (Austria)	3–1	(Poland) Amica Wronki
Kollmann 32', 61' (pen.), 72'	Report	Dembiński 27'

Stadion Graz-Liebenau, Graz
Attendance: 6,000
Referee: Jouni Hyytiä (Finland)
4 November 2004
21:15

AZ (Netherlands)	2–0	(France) Auxerre
Huysegems 2', 18'	Report

Alkmaarderhout, Alkmaar
Attendance: 8,123
Referee: Andy D'Urso (England)

25 November 2004
17:30

Amica Wronki (Poland)	1–3	(Netherlands) AZ
Dembiński 58' (pen.)	Report	Van Galen 13'; Meerdink 37'; Huysegems 39'

Stadion Amica, Wronki
Attendance: 1,397
Referee: Romāns Lajuks (Latvia)
25 November 2004
20:45

Rangers (Scotland)	3–0	(Austria) GAK
Novo 58'; Arveladze 85'; Namouchi 90+3'	Report

Ibrox Stadium, Glasgow
Attendance: 44,453
Referee: Olegário Benquerença (Portugal)

2 December 2004
20:45

AZ (Netherlands)	1–0	(Scotland) Rangers
Landzaat 7'	Report

Alkmaarderhout, Alkmaar
Attendance: 8,343
Referee: Alon Yefet (Israel)
2 December 2004
20:45

Auxerre (France)	5–1	(Poland) Amica Wronki
Mignot 1'; Pieroni 5', 24', 26'; Kalou 56'	Report	Kryszałowicz 14'

Stade de l'Abbé-Deschamps, Auxerre
Attendance: 2,977
Referee: Georgios Douros (Greece)

15 December 2004
20:45

GAK (Austria)	2–0	(Netherlands) AZ
Aufhauser 41'; Kollmann 54' (pen.)	Report

Stadion Graz-Liebenau, Graz
Attendance: 8,667
Referee: Anton Genov (Bulgaria)
15 December 2004
20:45

Rangers (Scotland)	0–2	(France) Auxerre
	Report	Kalou 9', 46'

Ibrox Stadium, Glasgow
Attendance: 48,847
Referee: Franz-Xaver Wack (Germany)

=== Group G ===
Pos	Team	Pld	W	D	L	GF	GA	GD	Pts	Qualification	STU	BEN	HVN	DZ	BEV
1	(Germany) VfB Stuttgart	4	3	0	1	10	3	+7	9	Advance to knockout stage	—	3–0	—	2–1	—
2	(Portugal) Benfica	4	3	0	1	9	5	+4	9	Advance to knockout stage	—	—	4–2	2–0	—
3	(Netherlands) Heerenveen	4	2	1	1	6	6	0	7	Advance to knockout stage	1–0	—	—	—	1–0
4	(Croatia) Dinamo Zagreb	4	1	1	2	9	7	+2	4		—	—	2–2	—	6–1
5	(Belgium) Beveren	4	0	0	4	2	15	−13	0		1–5	0–3	—	—	—

Source: RSSSF
21 October 2004
20:45

Beveren (Belgium)	1–5	(Germany) VfB Stuttgart
Romaric 86'	Report	Cacau 9', 52'; Kurányi 39'; Lahm 76'; Szabics 90+1'

Freethiel Stadion, Beveren
Attendance: 5,650
Referee: Steve Bennett (England)
21 October 2004
22:15

Benfica (Portugal)	4–2	(Netherlands) Heerenveen
Manuel Fernandes 14'; Nuno Gomes 32', 78'; Karadas 73'	Report	Yıldırım 49'; Huntelaar 53' (pen.)

Estádio da Luz, Lisbon
Attendance: 16,080
Referee: Jacek Granat (Poland)

4 November 2004
18:15

VfB Stuttgart (Germany)	3–0	(Portugal) Benfica
Cacau 31'; Lahm 52'; Kurányi 72'	Report

Gottlieb-Daimler-Stadion, Stuttgart
Attendance: 44,000
Referee: Bertrand Layec (France)
4 November 2004
18:30

Dinamo Zagreb (Croatia)	6–1	(Belgium) Beveren
Eduardo 18'; Mijatović 21'; Zahora 35', 41'; Kranjčar 55'; Mujčin 67'	Report	Vleminckx 81'

Stadion Maksimir, Zagreb
Attendance: 7,156
Referee: Kenny Clark (Scotland)

25 November 2004
21:00

Benfica (Portugal)	2–0	(Croatia) Dinamo Zagreb
Šokota 11'; Simão 29' (pen.)	Report

Estádio da Luz, Lisbon
Attendance: 14,000
Referee: Gianluca Paparesta (Italy)
25 November 2004
21:30

Heerenveen (Netherlands)	1–0	(Germany) VfB Stuttgart
Yıldırım 65'	Report

Abe Lenstra Stadion, Heerenveen
Attendance: 17,200
Referee: Michal Beneš (Czech Republic)

2 December 2004
20:45

Dinamo Zagreb (Croatia)	2–2	(Netherlands) Heerenveen
Bošnjak 14'; Pranjić 57'	Report	Yıldırım 84'; Huntelaar 88' (pen.)

Stadion Maksimir, Zagreb
Attendance: 7,154
Referee: Fritz Stuchlik (Austria)
2 December 2004
20:45

Beveren (Belgium)	0–3	(Portugal) Benfica
	Report	Simão 5' (pen.); Zahovič 21', 59'

Freethiel Stadion, Beveren
Attendance: 6,646
Referee: Martin Hansson (Sweden)

15 December 2004
20:45

VfB Stuttgart (Germany)	2–1	(Croatia) Dinamo Zagreb
Tiffert 14'; Meira 74'	Report	Bošnjak 65'

Gottlieb-Daimler-Stadion, Stuttgart
Attendance: 41,000
Referee: Eduardo Iturralde González (Spain)
15 December 2004
20:45

Heerenveen (Netherlands)	1–0	(Belgium) Beveren
Bruggink 26'	Report

Abe Lenstra Stadion, Heerenveen
Attendance: 17,660
Referee: Tommy Skjerven (Norway)

=== Group H ===
Pos	Team	Pld	W	D	L	GF	GA	GD	Pts	Qualification	LIL	SEV	AAC	ZEN	AEK
1	(France) Lille	4	3	0	1	5	3	+2	9	Advance to knockout stage	—	1–0	—	2–1	—
2	(Spain) Sevilla	4	2	1	1	6	4	+2	7	Advance to knockout stage	—	—	2–0	—	3–2
3	(Germany) Alemannia Aachen	4	2	1	1	5	4	+1	7	Advance to knockout stage	1–0	—	—	2–2	—
4	(Russia) Zenit Saint Petersburg	4	1	2	1	9	6	+3	5		—	1–1	—	—	5–1
5	(Greece) AEK Athens	4	0	0	4	4	12	−8	0		1–2	—	0–2	—	—

Source: RSSSF
21 October 2004
18:00

Zenit Saint Petersburg (Russia)	5–1	(Greece) AEK Athens
Arshavin 44'; Kerzhakov 48', 54', 78'; Denisov 86'	Report	Krassas 3'

Petrovsky Stadium, Saint Petersburg
Attendance: 21,500
Referee: Antonio Costa (Portugal)
21 October 2004
18:15

Alemannia Aachen (Germany)	1–0	(France) Lille
Meijer 67'	Report

RheinEnergieStadion, Cologne
Attendance: 20,352
Referee: Edo Trivković (Croatia)

4 November 2004
20:45

Lille (France)	2–1	(Russia) Zenit Saint Petersburg
Tafforeau 35'; Moussilou 41'	Report	Kerzhakov 38'

Stadium Lille Métropole, Villeneuve-d'Ascq
Attendance: 9,109
Referee: Philippe Leuba (Switzerland)
4 November 2004
21:30

Sevilla (Spain)	2–0	(Germany) Alemannia Aachen
Aranda 8'; Baptista 77' (pen.)	Report

Ramón Sánchez Pizjuán Stadium, Seville
Attendance: 28,024
Referee: Dejan Delević (Serbia and Montenegro)

25 November 2004
18:00

Zenit Saint Petersburg (Russia)	1–1	(Spain) Sevilla
Arshavin 35'	Report	Baptista 71'

Petrovsky Stadium, Saint Petersburg
Attendance: 21,300
Referee: Dougie McDonald (Scotland)
25 November 2004
20:00

AEK Athens (Greece)	1–2	(France) Lille
Amponsah 72'	Report	Vitakić 26'; Debuchy 63'

Olympic Stadium, Athens
Attendance: 22,015
Referee: Bernhard Brugger (Austria)

2 December 2004
20:45

Sevilla (Spain)	3–2	(Greece) AEK Athens
Baptista 19', 89' (pen.); Antoñito 29'	Report	Liberopoulos 10'; Tziortziopoulos 47'

Ramón Sánchez Pizjuán Stadium, Seville
Attendance: 23,641
Referee: Eric Braamhaar (Netherlands)
2 December 2004
20:45

Alemannia Aachen (Germany)	2–2	(Russia) Zenit Saint Petersburg
Meijer 25'; Blank 88' (pen.)	Report	Radimov 37' (pen.); Horshkov 75'

RheinEnergieStadion, Cologne
Attendance: 25,300
Referee: Sorin Carpodean (Romania)

15 December 2004
20:45

Lille (France)	1–0	(Spain) Sevilla
Moussilou 77'	Report

Stadium Lille Métropole, Villeneuve-d'Ascq
Attendance: 10,747
Referee: Domenico Messina (Italy)
15 December 2004
20:45

AEK Athens (Greece)	0–2	(Germany) Alemannia Aachen
	Report	Meijer 57'; Gomez 84'

Olympic Stadium, Athens
Attendance: 4,711
Referee: Serhiy Shebek (Ukraine)
