= Christos Christoforidis =

Swedish footballer

Personal information
- Full name: Christos Christoforidis
- Date of birth: 31 December 1981 (age 44)
- Place of birth: Norrköping, Sweden
- Height: 1.79 m (5 ft 10 in)
- Position: Forward

Senior career*
Years	Team	Apps	(Gls)
2000–2002	IF Sylvia	30	(2)
2002–2005	Assyriska FF	51	(22)
2005	AEK Athens	1	(0)
2005–2006	Apollon Kalamarias	5	(0)
2006–2007	Messiniakos	23	(5)
2007–2009	GAIS	11	(3)
2008	→ Syrianska FC (loan)	6	(1)
2009–2010	Syrianska FC		
2010–2011	FK Linköping		
2011–2016	Assyriska IF		
- * Club domestic league appearances and goals

Christos Christoforidis (Greek: Χρήστος Χρηστοφορίδης; born 31 December 1981) is a Swedish former professional footballer who played as a forward.

== Club career ==
Christoforidis started his football career at the local IF Sylvia in 2000 and played with them for two seasons. In 2002 he was transferred to Assyriska FF, where he played for three seasons. In July 2004 he was injured and underwent surgery on his adductors and missed the rest of the Swedish championship which ended in October. In January 2005 and after eight months of absence from competitive action he moved to Greece to be tested by the manager of AEK Athens, Fernando Santos. He left a good impression and on 18 January 2005 he signed a 1+3 year contract with the club.

With AEK, he played in one league match as a starter against Kerkyra and one cup match coming on as a substitute against Panathinaikos. His many months of abstinence resulted Christoforidis not being able to adapt to the team and thus on 21 July he was released from the club. The following two seasons he played at Apollon Kalamarias and Messiniakos, before returning to Sweden in 2007 to play for GAIS.

In 2008 he was loaned to Syrianska FC, before joining them with a permanent transfer in 2009. In 2010 he joined FK Linköping for a season before moving to Assyriska IF where he played until 2016 when he ended his football career.
