= Grigoris Toskas =

Greek footballer

Personal information
- Full name: Grigorios Toskas
- Date of birth: 8 January 1983 (age 43)
- Place of birth: Athens, Greece
- Height: 1.81 m (5 ft 11 1/2 in)
- Position: Defender

Youth career
- 2000: AEK Athens

Senior career*
Years	Team	Apps	(Gls)
2000–2005	AEK Athens	7	(0)
2005–2007	Kerkyra	45	(0)
2007–2008	Ionikos	28	(0)
2008–2009	Kallithea	28	(0)
2009–2010	Kalamata	11	(0)
2010–2011	Egaleo	3	(0)
2011	Elpidoforos		
2011–2013	Pannaxiakos		
2013–2014	Triglia Rafinas		
Total		122	(0)
- * Club domestic league appearances and goals

Grigoris Toskas (Greek: Γρηγόρης Τόσκας; born 8 January 1983) is a former Greek footballer. Toskas played for AEK Athens, Kerkyra, Ionikos, Kallithea, Egaleo, and Pannaxiakos.

== Club career ==
Toskas began his career at the age of 17, joining the academies, of AEK Athens. In 2000 he signed a professional contract and was promoted to the men's team. In his five seasons at the club he managed to make a few appearances, winning the Cup in 2002. On 4 July 2005 after his contract with AEK had expired he joined Kerkyra, where he played 2 seasons as a regular. Afterwards, he played a season in both Ionikos and Kallithea. In 2009 he signed for Kalamata, where he played for a season. Afterwards he moved to Egaleo and from the following season he played for the lower division clubs, Elpidoforos and Pannaxiakos. In the summer of 2013, he moved to Triglia Rafinas, where he retired in 2014.

== Personal life ==
His father, Apostolos was a former international defender that also played for AEK Athens. He participates in the Veterans Association of AEK Athens.

== Honours ==
AEK Athens

- Greek Cup: 2001–02
