= 2004–05 UEFA Cup knockout stage =

International football competition

The knockout stage of the 2004–05 UEFA Cup began on 16 February 2005, and concluded with the final at the Estádio José Alvalade in Lisbon on 18 May 2005. The final phase involved the 24 teams that finished in the top three in each group in the group stage and the eight teams that finished in third place in the UEFA Champions League group stage.

Times are CET/CEST, (Note: CET (UTC+1) for dates up to 26 March 2005 (round of 32 and round of 16), and CEST (UTC+2) for dates thereafter (quarter-finals, semi-finals and final).) as listed by UEFA.

== Qualified teams ==
The knockout stage involved 32 teams: the 24 teams which qualified as the winners, runners-up and third-placed teams of each of the eight groups in the group stage, and the eight third-placed teams from the Champions League group stage.

=== UEFA Cup group stage top-three teams ===
Group	Winners	Runners-up	Third-placed teams
A	(Netherlands) Feyenoord	(Germany) Schalke 04	(Switzerland) Basel
B	(Spain) Athletic Bilbao	(Romania) Steaua București	(Italy) Parma
C	(Ukraine) Dnipro Dnipropetrovsk	(Spain) Zaragoza	Austria Wien
D	(England) Newcastle United	(France) Sochaux	(Portugal) Sporting CP
E	(England) Middlesbrough	(Spain) Villarreal	(Serbia and Montenegro) Partizan
F	(Netherlands) AZ	(France) Auxerre	(Austria) GAK
G	(Germany) VfB Stuttgart	(Portugal) Benfica	(Netherlands) Heerenveen
H	(France) Lille	(Spain) Sevilla	(Germany) Alemannia Aachen

=== Champions League group stage third-placed teams ===
Group	Third-placed teams
A	(Greece) Olympiacos
B	(Ukraine) Dynamo Kyiv
C	(Netherlands) Ajax
D	(Turkey) Fenerbahçe
E	(Greece) Panathinaikos
F	(Ukraine) Shakhtar Donetsk
G	(Spain) Valencia
H	(Russia) CSKA Moscow

== Format ==
Each tie in the final phase, apart from the final, was played over two legs, with each team playing one leg at home. The team that had the higher aggregate score over the two legs progressed to the next round. In the event that aggregate scores finished level, the team that scored more goals away from home over the two legs progressed. If away goals are also equal, 30 minutes of extra time were played. If goals were scored during extra time and the aggregate score was still level, the visiting team qualified by virtue of more away goals scored. If no goals were scored during extra time, there would be a penalty shoot-out after extra time.

In the final, the tie was played over just one leg at a neutral venue. If scores were level at the end of normal time in the final, extra time was played, followed by penalties if scores had remained tied.

== Bracket ==
Round of 32
(Greece) Olympiacos	1	1	2
(France) Sochaux	0	0	0
(Netherlands) Heerenveen	1	1	2
(England) Newcastle United	2	2	4
(Austria) GAK	2	1	3
(England) Middlesbrough	2	2	4
(Portugal) Sporting CP	2	2	4
(Netherlands) Feyenoord	1	1	2
(Spain) Valencia	2	0	2 (3)
(Romania) Steaua București (p)	0	2	2 (4)
(Ukraine) Dynamo Kyiv	0	0	0
(Spain) Villarreal	0	2	2
(Ukraine) Shakhtar Donetsk	1	1	2
(Germany) Schalke 04	1	0	1
(Germany) Alemannia Aachen	0	1	1
(Netherlands) AZ	0	2	2
Austria Wien	0	2	2
(Spain) Athletic Bilbao	0	1	1
(Turkey) Fenerbahçe	0	1	1
(Spain) Zaragoza	1	2	3
(Greece) Panathinaikos	1	0	1
(Spain) Sevilla	0	2	2
(Italy) Parma (a.e.t.)	0	2	2
(Germany) VfB Stuttgart	0	0	0
(Serbia and Montenegro) Partizan	2	1	3
(Ukraine) Dnipro Dnipropetrovsk	2	0	2
(Russia) CSKA Moscow	2	1	3
(Portugal) Benfica	0	1	1
(Switzerland) Basel	0	0	0
(France) Lille	0	2	2
(Netherlands) Ajax	1	1	2
(France) Auxerre	0	3	3

Round of 16
(Greece) Olympiacos	1	0	1
(England) Newcastle United	3	4	7
(England) Middlesbrough	2	0	2
(Portugal) Sporting CP	3	1	4
(Romania) Steaua București	0	0	0
(Spain) Villarreal	0	2	2
(Ukraine) Shakhtar Donetsk	1	1	2
(Netherlands) AZ	3	2	5
Austria Wien (a)	1	2	3
(Spain) Zaragoza	1	2	3
(Spain) Sevilla	0	0	0
(Italy) Parma	0	1	1
(Serbia and Montenegro) Partizan	1	0	1
(Russia) CSKA Moscow	1	2	3
(France) Lille	0	0	0
(France) Auxerre	1	0	1

Quarter-finals
(England) Newcastle United	1	1	2
(Portugal) Sporting CP	0	4	4
(Spain) Villarreal	1	1	2
(Netherlands) AZ	2	1	3
Austria Wien	1	0	1
(Italy) Parma (a)	1	0	1
(Russia) CSKA Moscow	4	0	4
(France) Auxerre	0	2	2

Semi-finals
(Portugal) Sporting CP (a.e.t.; a)	2	2	4
(Netherlands) AZ	1	3	4
(Italy) Parma	0	0	0
(Russia) CSKA Moscow	0	3	3

Final
18 May – Lisbon
(Portugal) Sporting CP	1
(Russia) CSKA Moscow	3

== Round of 32 ==
=== Summary ===
Team 1	Agg.	Team 2	1st leg	2nd leg
Olympiacos (Greece)	2–0	(France) Sochaux	1–0	1–0
Heerenveen (Netherlands)	2–4	(England) Newcastle United	1–2	1–2
GAK (Austria)	3–4	(England) Middlesbrough	2–2	1–2
Sporting CP (Portugal)	4–2	(Netherlands) Feyenoord	2–1	2–1
Valencia (Spain)	2–2 (3–4 p)	(Romania) Steaua București	2–0	0–2 (a.e.t.)
Dynamo Kyiv (Ukraine)	0–2	(Spain) Villarreal	0–0	0–2
Shakhtar Donetsk (Ukraine)	2–1	(Germany) Schalke 04	1–1	1–0
Alemannia Aachen (Germany)	1–2	(Netherlands) AZ	0–0	1–2
Austria Wien	2–1	(Spain) Athletic Bilbao	0–0	2–1
Fenerbahçe (Turkey)	1–3	(Spain) Zaragoza	0–1	1–2
Panathinaikos (Greece)	1–2	(Spain) Sevilla	1–0	0–2
Parma (Italy)	2–0	(Germany) VfB Stuttgart	0–0	2–0 (a.e.t.)
Partizan (Serbia and Montenegro)	3–2	(Ukraine) Dnipro Dnipropetrovsk	2–2	1–0
CSKA Moscow (Russia)	3–1	(Portugal) Benfica	2–0	1–1
Basel (Switzerland)	0–2	(France) Lille	0–0	0–2
Ajax (Netherlands)	2–3	(France) Auxerre	1–0	1–3

=== Matches ===
17 February 2005
20:45

Olympiacos (Greece)	1–0	(France) Sochaux
Okkas 29'	Report

Georgios Karaiskakis Stadium, Piraeus
Attendance: 29,634
Referee: Nikolai Ivanov (Russia)
24 February 2005
19:00

Sochaux (France)	0–1	(Greece) Olympiacos
	Report	Stoltidis 67'

Stade Auguste Bonal, Montbéliard
Attendance: 10,962
Referee: Markus Nobs (Switzerland)

Olympiacos won 2–0 on aggregate.

17 February 2005
20:45

Heerenveen (Netherlands)	1–2	(England) Newcastle United
Huntelaar 24'	Report	Shearer 68'; Bowyer 82'

Abe Lenstra Stadion, Heerenveen
Attendance: 19,700
Referee: Zsolt Szabó (Hungary)
24 February 2005
20:45

Newcastle United (England)	2–1	(Netherlands) Heerenveen
Breuer 10' (o.g.); Shearer 25'	Report	Bruggink 18' (pen.)

St James' Park, Newcastle upon Tyne
Attendance: 26,156
Referee: Dejan Delević (Serbia and Montenegro)

Newcastle United won 4–2 on aggregate.

17 February 2005
18:30

GAK (Austria)	2–2	(England) Middlesbrough
Bazina 64'; Kollmann 79'	Report	Zenden 52'; Hasselbaink 66'

Stadion Graz-Liebenau, Graz
Attendance: 12,614
Referee: Edo Trivković (Croatia)
24 February 2005
20:45

Middlesbrough (England)	2–1	(Austria) GAK
Morrison 18'; Hasselbaink 60'	Report	Bazina 79'

Riverside Stadium, Middlesbrough
Attendance: 20,371
Referee: Eduardo Iturralde González (Spain)

Middlesbrough won 4–3 on aggregate.

16 February 2005
22:15

Sporting CP (Portugal)	2–1	(Netherlands) Feyenoord
Custódio 22'; Liédson 36'	Report	Goor 11'

Estádio José Alvalade, Lisbon
Attendance: 19,091
Referee: Stefan Messner (Austria)
24 February 2005
20:45

Feyenoord (Netherlands)	1–2	(Portugal) Sporting CP
Hofs 89'	Report	Liédson 62'; Rochemback 83'

De Kuip, Rotterdam
Attendance: 31,000
Referee: Florian Meyer (Germany)

Sporting CP won 4–2 on aggregate.

16 February 2005
21:30

Valencia (Spain)	2–0	(Romania) Steaua București
Di Vaio 39'; Aimar 55'	Report

Mestalla Stadium, Valencia
Attendance: 22,932
Referee: Domenico Messina (Italy)
24 February 2005
19:00

Steaua București (Romania)	2–0 (a.e.t.)	(Spain) Valencia
Cristea 50', 71'	Report
Penalties
Rădoi (penalty scored); Munteanu (penalty missed); Lovin (penalty scored); Boștină (penalty scored); Dică (penalty scored)	4–3	(penalty scored) Aimar; (penalty scored) Mista; (penalty scored) Rufete; (penalty missed) Baraja; (penalty missed) Di Vaio

Stadionul Steaua, Bucharest
Attendance: 18,848
Referee: Johan Verbist (Belgium)

2–2 on aggregate; Steaua București won 4–3 on penalties.

17 February 2005
17:00

Dynamo Kyiv (Ukraine)	0–0	(Spain) Villarreal
	Report

Valeriy Lobanovskyi Dynamo Stadium, Kyiv
Attendance: 8,000
Referee: Laurent Duhamel (France)
24 February 2005
21:30

Villarreal (Spain)	2–0	(Ukraine) Dynamo Kyiv
Figueroa 20'; Cazorla 31'	Report

Estadio El Madrigal, Villarreal
Attendance: 6,118
Referee: Matt Messias (England)

Villarreal won 2–0 on aggregate.

16 February 2005
18:15

Shakhtar Donetsk (Ukraine)	1–1	(Germany) Schalke 04
Brandão 86'	Report	Aílton 7'

RSC Olimpiyskiy, Donetsk
Attendance: 25,066
Referee: Espen Berntsen (Norway)
24 February 2005
18:00

Schalke 04 (Germany)	0–1	(Ukraine) Shakhtar Donetsk
	Report	Aghahowa 22'

Arena AufSchalke, Gelsenkirchen
Attendance: 51,180
Referee: Vladimír Hriňák (Slovakia)

Shakhtar Donetsk won 2–1 on aggregate.

17 February 2005
20:30

Alemannia Aachen (Germany)	0–0	(Netherlands) AZ
	Report

RheinEnergieStadion, Cologne
Attendance: 38,034
Referee: Georgios Kasnaferis (Greece)
24 February 2005
18:30

AZ (Netherlands)	2–1	(Germany) Alemannia Aachen
Van Galen 62'; Mathijsen 80'	Report	Meijer 31'

Alkmaarderhout, Alkmaar
Attendance: 7,980
Referee: Darko Čeferin (Slovenia)

AZ won 2–1 on aggregate.

24 February 2005
19:30

Austria Wien	0–0	(Spain) Athletic Bilbao
	Report

Ernst-Happel-Stadion, Vienna
Attendance: 17,400
Referee: Alon Yefet (Israel)
27 February 2005
18:00

Athletic Bilbao (Spain)	1–2	Austria Wien
Yeste 19' (pen.)	Report	Sionko 35', 70'

San Mamés Stadium, Bilbao
Attendance: 30,535
Referee: Grzegorz Gilewski (Poland)

Austria Wien won 2–1 on aggregate.

17 February 2005
19:00

Fenerbahçe (Turkey)	0–1	(Spain) Zaragoza
	Report	Álvaro 72'

Şükrü Saracoğlu Stadium, Istanbul
Attendance: 37,000
Referee: Nicolai Vollquartz (Denmark)
24 February 2005
20:45

Zaragoza (Spain)	2–1	(Turkey) Fenerbahçe
Galletti 11'; Sávio 71'	Report	Alex 88'

La Romareda, Zaragoza
Attendance: 13,555
Referee: Eric Braamhaar (Netherlands)

Zaragoza won 3–1 on aggregate.

16 February 2005
19:00

Panathinaikos (Greece)	1–0	(Spain) Sevilla
Vyntra 75'	Report

Leoforos Alexandras Stadium, Athens
Attendance: 7,145
Referee: Claude Colombo (France)
24 February 2005
21:30

Sevilla (Spain)	2–0	(Greece) Panathinaikos
Makukula 83'; Adriano 90+2'	Report

Ramón Sánchez Pizjuán Stadium, Seville
Attendance: 32,449
Referee: Tom Henning Øvrebø (Norway)

Sevilla won 2–1 on aggregate.

16 February 2005
20:30

Parma (Italy)	0–0	(Germany) VfB Stuttgart
	Report

Stadio Ennio Tardini, Parma
Attendance: 3,912
Referee: Paul Allaerts (Belgium)
24 February 2005
20:30

VfB Stuttgart (Germany)	0–2 (a.e.t.)	(Italy) Parma
	Report	Marchionni 100'; Pisanu 116'

Gottlieb-Daimler-Stadion, Stuttgart
Attendance: 33,843
Referee: Kenny Clark (Scotland)

Parma won 2–0 on aggregate.

16 February 2005
17:00

Partizan (Serbia and Montenegro)	2–2	(Ukraine) Dnipro Dnipropetrovsk
Odita 12', 45'	Report	Nazarenko 28'; Rusol 57'

Partizan Stadium, Belgrade
Attendance: 10,923
Referee: Martin Hansson (Sweden)
24 February 2005
17:00

Dnipro Dnipropetrovsk (Ukraine)	0–1	(Serbia and Montenegro) Partizan
	Report	Radović 88'

Meteor Stadium, Dnipropetrovsk
Attendance: 14,000
Referee: Helmut Fleischer (Germany)

Partizan won 3–2 on aggregate.

17 February 2005
19:00

CSKA Moscow (Russia)	2–0	(Portugal) Benfica
V. Berezutski 12'; Vágner Love 60'	Report

Kuban Stadium, Krasnodar
Attendance: 25,500
Referee: Alexandru Tudor (Romania)
24 February 2005
21:30

Benfica (Portugal)	1–1	(Russia) CSKA Moscow
Karadas 63'	Report	Ignashevich 49'

Estádio da Luz, Lisbon
Attendance: 23,732
Referee: Dougie McDonald (Scotland)

CSKA Moscow won 3–1 on aggregate.

17 February 2005
20:30

Basel (Switzerland)	0–0	(France) Lille
	Report

St. Jakob-Park, Basel
Attendance: 19,029
Referee: Anton Genov (Bulgaria)
24 February 2005
21:00

Lille (France)	2–0	(Switzerland) Basel
Moussilou 37'; Ačimovič 78' (pen.)	Report

Stadium Lille Métropole, Villeneuve-d'Ascq
Attendance: 8,832
Referee: Pedro Proença (Portugal)

Lille won 2–0 on aggregate.

16 February 2005
20:00

Ajax (Netherlands)	1–0	(France) Auxerre
Maxwell 36'	Report

Amsterdam Arena, Amsterdam
Attendance: 42,313
Referee: Jaroslav Jára (Czech Republic)
24 February 2005
20:45

Auxerre (France)	3–1	(Netherlands) Ajax
Kalou 31'; Cheyrou 55'; Mathis 86'	Report	Babel 36'

Stade de l'Abbé-Deschamps, Auxerre
Attendance: 13,752
Referee: Olegário Benquerença (Portugal)

Auxerre won 3–2 on aggregate.

== Round of 16 ==
=== Summary ===
Team 1	Agg.	Team 2	1st leg	2nd leg
Olympiacos (Greece)	1–7	(England) Newcastle United	1–3	0–4
Middlesbrough (England)	2–4	(Portugal) Sporting CP	2–3	0–1
Steaua București (Romania)	0–2	(Spain) Villarreal	0–0	0–2
Shakhtar Donetsk (Ukraine)	2–5	(Netherlands) AZ	1–3	1–2
Austria Wien	3–3 (a)	(Spain) Zaragoza	1–1	2–2
Sevilla (Spain)	0–1	(Italy) Parma	0–0	0–1
Partizan (Serbia and Montenegro)	1–3	(Russia) CSKA Moscow	1–1	0–2
Lille (France)	0–1	(France) Auxerre	0–1	0–0

=== Matches ===
10 March 2005
18:00

Olympiacos (Greece)	1–3	(England) Newcastle United
Đorđević 14' (pen.)	Report	Shearer 12' (pen.); Robert 33'; Kluivert 68'

Georgios Karaiskakis Stadium, Piraeus
Attendance: 30,595
Referee: Arturo Daudén Ibáñez (Spain)
16 March 2005
20:45

Newcastle United (England)	4–0	(Greece) Olympiacos
Dyer 18'; Shearer 45', 69'; Bowyer 54'	Report

St James' Park, Newcastle upon Tyne
Attendance: 32,163
Referee: Konrad Plautz (Austria)

Newcastle United won 7–1 on aggregate.

10 March 2005
21:10

Middlesbrough (England)	2–3	(Portugal) Sporting CP
Job 79'; Riggott 86'	Report	Barbosa 49'; Liédson 53'; Douala 65'

Riverside Stadium, Middlesbrough
Attendance: 23,739
Referee: Stefano Farina (Italy)
17 March 2005
20:45

Sporting CP (Portugal)	1–0	(England) Middlesbrough
Barbosa 69'	Report

Estádio José Alvalade, Lisbon
Attendance: 21,217
Referee: Éric Poulat (France)

Sporting CP won 4–2 on aggregate.

16 March 2005
19:00

Steaua București (Romania)	0–0	(Spain) Villarreal
	Report

Stadionul Steaua, Bucharest
Attendance: 24,000
Referee: Massimo Busacca (Switzerland)
20 March 2005
20:00

Villarreal (Spain)	2–0	(Romania) Steaua București
José Mari 6'; Riquelme 62' (pen.)	Report

Estadio El Madrigal, Villarreal
Attendance: 15,364
Referee: Wolfgang Stark (Germany)

Villarreal won 2–0 on aggregate.

10 March 2005
18:00

Shakhtar Donetsk (Ukraine)	1–3	(Netherlands) AZ
Matuzalém 45+1'	Report	Nelisse 27'; Mathijsen 51'; Perez 90+2'

RSC Olimpiyskiy, Donetsk
Attendance: 24,327
Referee: Bertrand Layec (France)
16 March 2005
20:30

AZ (Netherlands)	2–1	(Ukraine) Shakhtar Donetsk
Van Galen 9'; Meerdink 65'	Report	Elano 66'

Alkmaarderhout, Alkmaar
Attendance: 8,300
Referee: Lucílio Batista (Portugal)

AZ won 5–2 on aggregate.

10 March 2005
19:30

Austria Wien	1–1	(Spain) Zaragoza
Rushfeldt 32'	Report	Sávio 74'

Ernst-Happel-Stadion, Vienna
Attendance: 21,000
Referee: Peter Fröjdfeldt (Sweden)
17 March 2005
20:45

Zaragoza (Spain)	2–2	Austria Wien
Villa 59'; Galletti 63'	Report	Papac 6'; Dosunmu 12'

La Romareda, Zaragoza
Attendance: 21,600
Referee: Alain Hamer (Luxembourg)

3–3 on aggregate; Austria Wien won on away goals.

10 March 2005
21:30

Sevilla (Spain)	0–0	(Italy) Parma
	Report

Ramón Sánchez Pizjuán Stadium, Seville
Attendance: 27,816
Referee: René Temmink (Netherlands)
17 March 2005
20:45

Parma (Italy)	1–0	(Spain) Sevilla
Cardone 19'	Report

Stadio Ennio Tardini, Parma
Attendance: 7,650
Referee: Claus Bo Larsen (Denmark)

Parma won 1–0 on aggregate.

10 March 2005
17:00

Partizan (Serbia and Montenegro)	1–1	(Russia) CSKA Moscow
Tomić 83' (pen.)	Report	Aldonin 17'

Partizan Stadium, Belgrade
Attendance: 15,700
Referee: Jan Wegereef (Netherlands)
17 March 2005
17:00

CSKA Moscow (Russia)	2–0	(Serbia and Montenegro) Partizan
Carvalho 68'; Vágner Love 84' (pen.)	Report

Kuban Stadium, Krasnodar
Attendance: 23,800
Referee: Gianluca Paparesta (Italy)

CSKA Moscow won 3–1 on aggregate.

10 March 2005
20:30

Lille (France)	0–1	(France) Auxerre
	Report	Akalé 45'

Stadium Lille Métropole, Villeneuve-d'Ascq
Attendance: 8,080
Referee: Yuri Baskakov (Russia)
17 March 2005
20:45

Auxerre (France)	0–0	(France) Lille
	Report

Stade de l'Abbé-Deschamps, Auxerre
Attendance: 8,629
Referee: Mike Riley (England)

Auxerre won 1–0 on aggregate.

== Quarter-finals ==
=== Summary ===
Team 1	Agg.	Team 2	1st leg	2nd leg
Newcastle United (England)	2–4	(Portugal) Sporting CP	1–0	1–4
Villarreal (Spain)	2–3	(Netherlands) AZ	1–2	1–1
Austria Wien	1–1 (a)	(Italy) Parma	1–1	0–0
CSKA Moscow (Russia)	4–2	(France) Auxerre	4–0	0–2

=== Matches ===
7 April 2005
20:45

Newcastle United (England)	1–0	(Portugal) Sporting CP
Shearer 37'	Report

St James' Park, Newcastle upon Tyne
Attendance: 36,753
Referee: Yuri Baskakov (Russia)
14 April 2005
21:15

Sporting CP (Portugal)	4–1	(England) Newcastle United
Niculae 40'; Sá Pinto 71'; Beto 76'; Rochemback 90+1'	Report	Dyer 20'

Estádio José Alvalade, Lisbon
Attendance: 33,309
Referee: Peter Fröjdfeldt (Sweden)

Sporting CP won 4–2 on aggregate.

7 April 2005
20:45

Villarreal (Spain)	1–2	(Netherlands) AZ
Riquelme 13'	Report	Landzaat 11'; Nelisse 74'

Estadio El Madrigal, Villarreal
Attendance: 9,973
Referee: Konrad Plautz (Austria)
14 April 2005
20:30

AZ (Netherlands)	1–1	(Spain) Villarreal
Perez 8'	Report	Figueroa 72'

Alkmaarderhout, Alkmaar
Attendance: 8,618
Referee: Roberto Rosetti (Italy)

AZ won 3–2 on aggregate.

7 April 2005
20:45

Austria Wien	1–1	(Italy) Parma
Mila 61'	Report	Pisanu 34'

Ernst-Happel-Stadion, Vienna
Attendance: 39,600
Referee: Éric Poulat (France)
14 April 2005
20:45

Parma (Italy)	0–0	Austria Wien
	Report

Stadio Ennio Tardini, Parma
Attendance: 10,669
Referee: Steve Bennett (England)

1–1 on aggregate; Parma won on away goals.

7 April 2005
18:30

CSKA Moscow (Russia)	4–0	(France) Auxerre
Odiah 21'; Ignashevich 63' (pen.); Vágner Love 71'; Gusev 77'	Report

Lokomotiv Stadium, Moscow
Attendance: 19,300
Referee: Luis Medina Cantalejo (Spain)
14 April 2005
20:45

Auxerre (France)	2–0	(Russia) CSKA Moscow
Lachuer 9'; Kalou 78' (pen.)	Report

Stade de l'Abbé-Deschamps, Auxerre
Attendance: 12,600
Referee: Wolfgang Stark (Germany)

CSKA Moscow won 4–2 on aggregate.

== Semi-finals ==
=== Summary ===
Team 1	Agg.	Team 2	1st leg	2nd leg
Sporting CP (Portugal)	4–4 (a)	(Netherlands) AZ	2–1	2–3 (a.e.t.)
Parma (Italy)	0–3	(Russia) CSKA Moscow	0–0	0–3

=== Matches ===
28 April 2005
21:15

Sporting CP (Portugal)	2–1	(Netherlands) AZ
Douala 37'; Pinilla 80'	Report	Landzaat 36'

Estádio José Alvalade, Lisbon
Attendance: 34,776
Referee: Massimo De Santis (Italy)
5 May 2005
21:00

AZ (Netherlands)	3–2 (a.e.t.)	(Portugal) Sporting CP
Perez 6'; Huysegems 79'; Jaliens 109'	Report	Liédson 45+3'; Garcia 120+2'

Alkmaarderhout, Alkmaar
Attendance: 8,600
Referee: Claus Bo Larsen (Denmark)

4–4 on aggregate; Sporting CP won on away goals.

28 April 2005
21:00

Parma (Italy)	0–0	(Russia) CSKA Moscow
	Report

Stadio Ennio Tardini, Parma
Attendance: 7,298
Referee: Massimo Busacca (Switzerland)
5 May 2005
18:45

CSKA Moscow (Russia)	3–0	(Italy) Parma
Carvalho 10', 53'; V. Berezutski 60'	Report

Lokomotiv Stadium, Moscow
Attendance: 26,000
Referee: Alain Hamer (Luxembourg)

CSKA Moscow won 3–0 on aggregate.

== Final ==
The final was played on 18 May 2005 at the Estádio José Alvalade in Lisbon, Portugal.

18 May 2005
20:45 (19:45 UTC+1)

Sporting CP (Portugal)	1–3	(Russia) CSKA Moscow
Rogério 29'	Report	A. Berezutski 56'; Zhirkov 65'; Vágner Love 75'

Estádio José Alvalade, Lisbon
Attendance: 47,085
Referee: Graham Poll (England)
