= Daniel Gomez (footballer, born 1979) =

French footballer

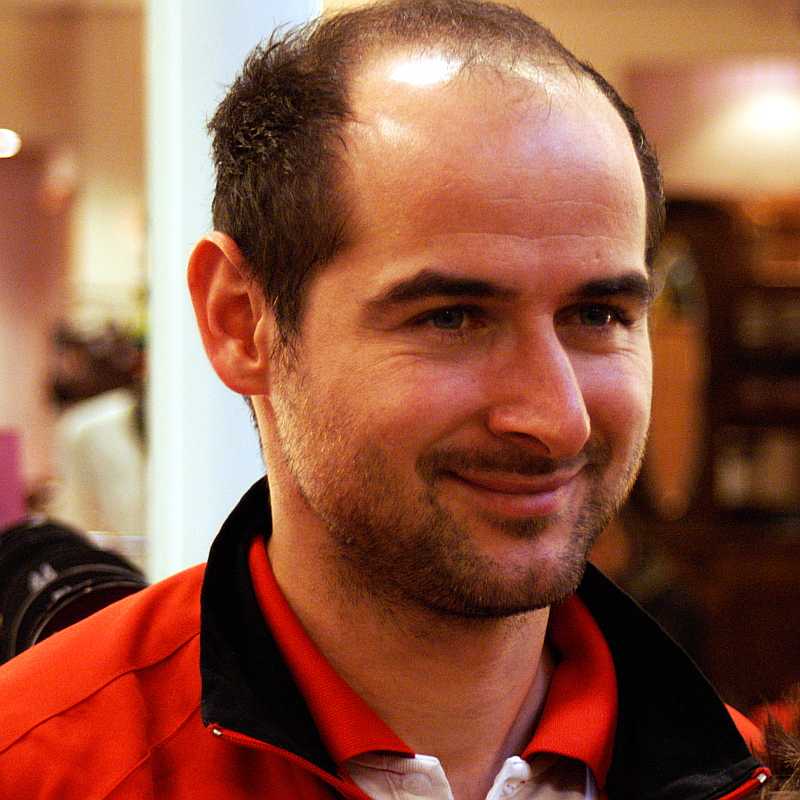

Personal information
- Date of birth: 16 March 1979 (age 47)
- Place of birth: Thionville, France
- Height: 1.77 m (5 ft 10 in)
- Position: Striker

Youth career
- FC Thionville

Senior career*
Years	Team	Apps	(Gls)
1997–2001	Metz B	40	(6)
2001–2003	Virton	63	(42)
2003–2005	Alemannia Aachen	41	(8)
2005–2006	Energie Cottbus	17	(1)
2006	Metz	4	(0)
2006–2010	MVV	104	(27)
2010–2011	Doxa Katokopias	17	(1)
2011–2012	Jeunesse d'Esch	24	(12)
2012–2013	F91 Dudelange	13	(0)
- * Club domestic league appearances and goals

Daniel Gomez (born 16 March 1979) is a French former professional footballer who played as a striker.

== Career ==
Gomez was born in Thionville, Moselle. He began his footballing career in his native France with Metz, and had stints in Belgium, Germany, Cyprus and finally Luxembourg. He last played for Luxembourg National Division side F91 Dudelange in the 2012–13 season.

On 9 November 2003, after the game he played for Alemannia Aachen against Arminia Bielefeld Gomez tested positive for methylprednisolone. While the German Football Association's sports acquitted him of doping he was sentenced to a ban totalling twelve league matches for violating the anti-doping guidelines.

== Honours ==
Alemannia Aachen

- DFB-Pokal finalist: 2003–04
