= Barry van Galen =

Dutch footballer (born 1970)

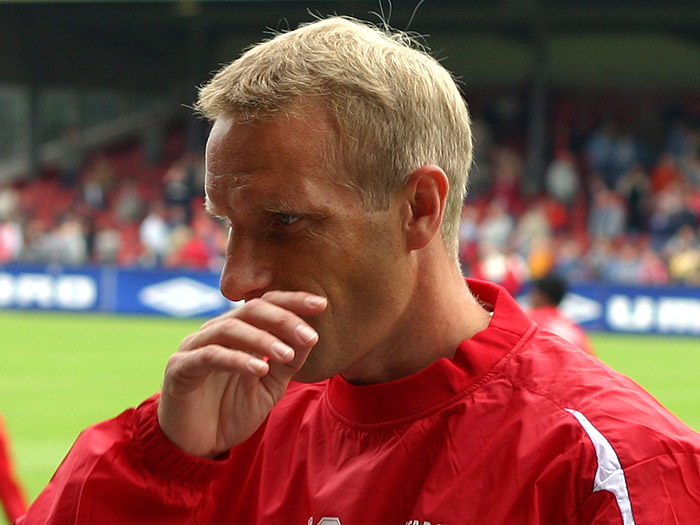
- Van Galen playing for AZ

Personal information
- Full name: Bart van Galen
- Date of birth: 4 April 1970 (age 56)
- Place of birth: Haarlem, Netherlands
- Height: 1.80 m (5 ft 11 in)
- Position: Midfielder

Youth career
- DSC '74
- RCH

Senior career*
| Years | Team | Apps | (Gls) |
| 1991–1993 | Haarlem | 57 | (26) |
| 1993–1996 | Roda JC | 77 | (17) |
| 1996–1997 | NAC | 28 | (3) |
| 1997–2006 | AZ | 246 | (54) |
| Total | | 408 | (100) |

International career
| 2004 | Netherlands | 1 | (0) |
- * Club domestic league appearances and goals

Bart "Barry" van Galen (Dutch pronunciation: [ˈbɑrd ˈbɑri vɑŋ ˈɣaːlə(n)]; born 4 April 1970, in Haarlem) is a Dutch retired footballer. He debuted in Dutch professional football on 17 August 1991 (Haarlem - Telstar 2–1). His playing career ended in 2006 and he scouted for AZ until 2019.

== Club career ==
Van Galen played youth football for amateur sides DSC '74 and RCH but started his professional career at hometown club Haarlem. He later played for Roda JC and NAC, but most prominently played for AZ with whom he won promotion to the Eredivisie and reached the 2004–05 UEFA Cup semi finals. After he retired, a bar in the AZ stadium was named after him.

== International career ==
Van Galen made one international appearance for the Netherlands national team in 2004 against Andorra.
