= Simos Krassas =

Cypriot footballer (born 1982)

Personal information
- Full name: Asimakis Krassas
- Date of birth: 10 July 1982 (age 44)
- Place of birth: Athens, Greece
- Height: 1.73 m (5 ft 8 in)
- Position: Winger

Youth career
- AEL Limassol

Senior career*
| Years | Team | Apps | (Gls) |
| 1994–2004 | AEL Limassol | 57 | (9) |
| 2004–2006 | AEK Athens | 27 | (2) |
| 2006 | → Panionios (loan) | 3 | (0) |
| 2006–2007 | Apollon Kalamarias | 10 | (0) |
| 2007–2010 | AEL Limassol | 60 | (7) |
| 2010–2012 | Alki Larnaca | 46 | (1) |
| 2012–2013 | Aris Limassol | 24 | (5) |
| 2014–2015 | Aris Limassol | 14 | (1) |
| 2015–2017 | AEZ Zakakiou | 0 | (0) |

International career^{‡}
| 2004–2008 | Cyprus | 17 | (1) |
- * Club domestic league appearances and goals as of October 13, 2014 ‡ National team caps and goals as of February 7, 2008

Asimakis "Simos" Krassas (Greek: Ασημάκης "Σίμος" Κρασσάς; born July 10, 1982, in Athens, Greece) is a Cypriot football midfielder.

== Club career ==
Krassas made his first football steps in AEL Limassol's Academy where served for many years as captain. On 30 July 2004, he moved to Greece and was transferred to AEK Athens for a fee of €120,000. In his first season at the club he was established as regular in the squad. On 5 January 2006 he was loand to Panionios for a fee of €75,000 and a buy-out option. On 26 July his contract was terminated and signed for Apollon Kalamarias, where he played for a season. In 2007 he returned to Cyprus and returned to AEL. He then continued his career playing Alki Larnaca and Aris Limassol until 2017 when he retired.

== International career ==
Krassas represented Cyprus from 2004 to 2008 making 17 appearnces and scoring once.
