= Stavros Tziortziopoulos =

Greek footballer and manager

Personal information
- Date of birth: 15 August 1978 (age 48)
- Place of birth: Athens, Greece
- Height: 1.85 m (6 ft 1 in)
- Position: Defender

Senior career*
Years	Team	Apps	(Gls)
1997–1998	Keratsini	20	(3)
1998–2002	Olympiacos	20	(1)
1999	→ Iraklis (loan)	14	(0)
2002–2003	Akratitos	17	(0)
2003–2004	Panionios	24	(1)
2004–2007	AEK Athens	35	(1)
2007	Omonia Nicosia	5	(0)
2008–2010	Skoda Xanthi	32	(1)
2010–2011	Panthrakikos	21	(1)
2011–2012	AEL Kalloni	14	(1)
2012–2013	Thrasyvoulos	25	(0)
2013–2014	A.E. Irakleio	23	(2)
2014–2015	Atromitos Chalandriou	2	(0)
2015–2017	A.P.S. Leon	0	(0)
- * Club domestic league appearances and goals as of 1 July 2011

Stavros Tziortziopoulos (Greek: Σταύρος Τζιωρτζιόπουλος; born 15 August 1978) is a Greek former professional footballer who played as a defender. He is the current manager of AEK Athens U12 team.

== Career ==
Tziortziopoulos started his career at third division side Keratsini. In 1997 and his performances caught the eye of Olympiacos, who signed him in the summer of 1998. Six months later he went on loan to Iraklis, where he played until January 2000, when he returned to Olympiacos to make his debut. The defender, a former Greece U21 international, played ten times as they won the league, but only made four more appearances in the following two triumphs.

In July 2002, he joined Akratitos and the following summer he signed for Panionios. After a fine season at the club, his career took off when on 14 July 2004 he signed for AEK Athens. When signing in AEK, Tziortziopoulos was among of the best Greek left-footed backs in the championship. After a few games with the team it was thought that he would be called to play for Greece. Unfortunately, he was injured in December 2004 and returned more than a year later. Since then, he has had his ups and downs, unable to stabilise his appearances with the team. On 12 November 2006, he scored for the first time for AEK Athens against AEL. On 7 June 2007, Tziortziopoulos was released by AEK Athens and immediately signed with the Cypriot side Omonia.
