= Kofi Amponsah =

Ghanaian footballer (born 1978)

Personal information
- Date of birth: 23 April 1978 (age 48)
- Place of birth: Accra, Ghana
- Height: 1.80 m (5 ft 11 in)
- Position: Centre-back

Senior career*
Years	Team	Apps	(Gls)
1997–1998	Ghapoha Readers	10	(0)
1998–1999	Panelefsiniakos	15	(1)
1999–2000	Olympiacos	10	(0)
2000–2003	PAOK	62	(2)
2003–2005	AEK Athens	20	(1)
2005	Egaleo	4	(0)
2005–2008	Apollon Kalamarias	46	(2)
2008–2009	Enosis Neon Paralimni	17	(0)
Total		184	(6)

International career
1998–2008	Ghana	19	(0)
- * Club domestic league appearances and goals

Kofi Amponsah (born 23 April 1978) is a Ghanaian former professional footballer who played as a centre-back.

== Club career ==
Amponsah began his career domestically in 1997 playing for Ghapoha Readers. In 1998 he moved to Greece and signed for Panelefsiniakos, where he spent half a season. He then moved to Olympiacos, where he played under Dušan Bajević. During his spell at the club he won two Greek Championships and a Greek Cup. In 2000 Bajević took charge of PAOK and brought Amponsah to the club. There he won another two Greek Cups. On 31 July 2003 Amponsah signed for AEK Athens, where Bajević was the manager. On 29 January 2005 his contract was terminated and Amponsah signed for Egaleo., where after a short spell at the club he moved to Apollon Kalamarias. In 2008 he moved to Cyprus and signed for Enosis Neon Paralimni. He spent a season at the club and ended his career in 2009.

== International career ==
Amponsah was part of the Ghana national team at the 2002 African Nations Cup, which exited in the quarter-finals after losing to Nigeria, having finished second in Group B.

== Honours ==
Ghapoha Readers

- Ghanaian FA Cup: 1996–97

Olympiacos

- Alpha Ethniki: 1998–99, 1999–2000
- Greek Cup: 1998–99

PAOK

- Greek Cup: 2000–01, 2002–03
