= Milivoje Vitakić =

Serbian footballer

Personal information
- Full name: Milivoje Vitakić
- Date of birth: 16 May 1977 (age 49)
- Place of birth: Čačak, SFR Yugoslavia
- Height: 1.85 m (6 ft 1 in)
- Position: Defender

Youth career
- Borac Čačak

Senior career*
Years	Team	Apps	(Gls)
1995–1997	Borac Čačak	46	(2)
1997–1998	Čukarički	24	(0)
1998–2004	Red Star Belgrade	98	(1)
2004–2007	Lille	44	(0)
2007–2010	Grenoble	78	(1)
Total		290	(4)

International career
1998–1999	FR Yugoslavia U21 (Note: Official UEFA matches only)	7	(0)
2004	Serbia and Montenegro	2	(0)
- * Club domestic league appearances and goals

Milivoje Vitakić (Serbian Cyrillic: Миливоје Витакић; born 16 May 1977) is a Serbian former footballer who played as a defender.

== Club career ==
Vitakić started out at his hometown club Borac Čačak, making his senior debut in 1995. He was acquired by Čukarički in 1997. In the summer of 1998, Vitakić was transferred to Red Star Belgrade. He spent the following six seasons with the Crveno-beli, winning three domestic league titles (2000, 2001 and 2004) and four national cups (1999, 2000, 2002 and 2004). In the summer of 2004, Vitakić moved abroad to France and signed with Lille. He stayed there for three years, before switching to fellow French club Grenoble.

== International career ==
At international level, Vitakić was capped twice for Serbia and Montenegro, making both appearances under manager Ilija Petković in 2004.

== Honours ==
Red Star Belgrade

- First League of Serbia and Montenegro: 1999–2000, 2000–01, 2003–04
- Serbia and Montenegro Cup: 1998–99, 1999–2000, 2001–02, 2003–04
