= AEK Athens F.C. in European football =

Greek club in European football

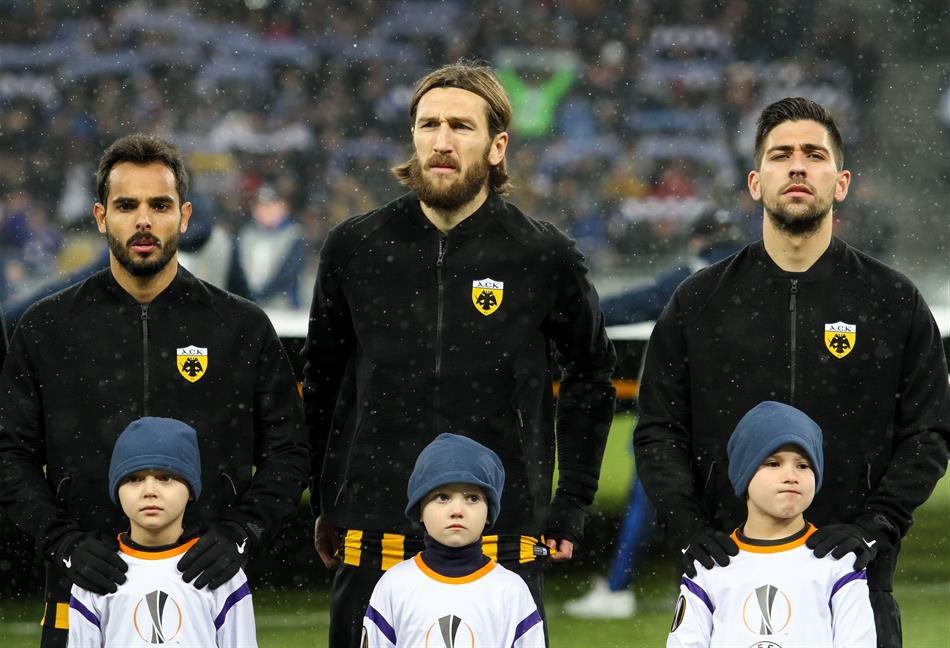
- AEK Athens' players lineup in the Europa League knockout match against Dynamo Kyiv.
- Club: AEK Athens
- Seasons played: 53
- Most appearances: Michalis Kasapis (67)
- Top scorer: Demis Nikolaidis (26)
- First entry: 1960–61 Balkans Cup
- Latest entry: 2026–27 UEFA Champions League

Titles
- Champions League: 0 (Best: Quarter-finals)
- Europa League: 0 (Best: Semi-finals)
- Cup Winners' Cup: 0 (Best: Quarter-finals - 1996–97, 1997–98)
- Conference League: 0 (Best: Quarter-finals)
- Super Cup: 0
- Inter-Cities Fairs Cup: 0 (Best: First round)

AEK Athens Football Club are a professional football club based in Nea Filadelfeia, Athens, Greece. The club first participated in a European competition on 15 February 1961. The club has gained entry to Union of European Football Associations (UEFA) competitions on multiple occasions. They have represented Greece in the European Cup (now the Champions League) on 14 occasions, the UEFA Cup (now the Europa League) on 24 occasions, the Conference League once, in the now-defunct Cup Winners' Cup on five occasions and in the now-defunct Inter-Cities Fairs Cup once. AEK have competed in every UEFA-organized competition, except the Intertoto Cup. They have also played in the now-defunct Balkans Cup on four occasions, where they reached its final in 1967.

AEK Athens are the first Greek club that reached the quarter-finals of the European Cup in 1968–69, the first Greek club that participated in the UEFA Champions League in 1992–93 and the first Greek club that participated its first group stage of the in 1994–95. In 2002–03 season, they became the only club to have drawn all their matches in the group stage of the UEFA Champions League, the only Greek club to have participated in the Champions League without losing a single match and the only club that has ever achieved six draws in six matches in a European competition. AEK Athens are the only Greek club to have reached the semi-finals of the UEFA Cup in 1976–77. AEK Athens are the only Greek club to have participated in the quarter-finals of all three European competitions at least once. AEK Athens is the only Greek club to have participated in the Europa League without losing a single match in 2017–18. They are the only Greek club to have advanced to the quarter-finals of European competitions 2 consecutive seasons in 1996–97 and 1997–98, the only Greek club to have advanced to the round of 16 in European competitions for 4 consecutive seasons in 1994–95, 1995–96, 1996–97 and 1997–98 and the only Greek club to have advanced to the round of 16 in the Cup Winners' Cup for 3 consecutive seasons 1995–96, 1996–97, 1997–98. They are also the only Greek club to have advanced to the round of 16 in the UEFA Cup for 3 consecutive seasons in 2000–01, 2001–02, 2002–03. AEK Athens hold the domestic record of the longest unbeaten streak in UEFA competitions with 14 consecutive games.

== History ==
=== First years ===
The first appearance of AEK Athens in European competitions was in the Balkans Cup of the 1960–61 season alongside Steagul Roșu Brașov, Levski Sofia, Partizani Tirana and Fenerbahçe. After 4 matchdays, they achieved 1 win 1 draw and 2 defeats, and when Steagul Roșu Brașov secured the title, AEK withdrew from the tournament, with the remaining games being awarded to their opponents.

Having won the championship of 1963, AEK competed for the first time in their history in UEFA competitions, playing in the preliminary round of the European Cup in 1963–64 season. The draw brought them against the French champions, Monaco. The first appearance in a UEFA match quickly turned into a nightmare, as they faced a 7–2 defeat at Stade Municipal du Ray, with a four-goal performance by Lucien Cossou and the goals of Yvon Douis and Karimou Djibrill with the Greek side reducing with Kostas Nestoridis and Fanis Tasinos. The rematch in Athens was purely procedural, as 1–1 draw with Theofanidis and Théodore couldn't change anything in the qualification outcome, as it was secured by the Monegasques from the first match.

In 1964, they played their first match in a final stage of a UEFA competition, competing in the first round of the European Cup Winners' Cup, which were drawn against Dinamo Zagreb. At AEK Stadium, both clubs started scared and harsh, with the Yugoslavs playing unsportsmanlike, as to kill the game off, while AEK pressed unorthodoxly. Eventually, the yellow-blacks scored twice with Mimis Papaioannou and Kostas Nestoridis and the game ended 2–0, achieving their first victory in UEFA competitions. In the rematch at Stadion Maksimir, Dynamo played offensively and managed to win by 3–0, which left AEK out of the tournament.

During the 1966–67 season AEK played in 2 European competitions. The first was the Cup Winners' Cup, with their opponent for its first round being Braga, who made their debut appearance in European competitions. The performance of the club in both legs was not enough as they were eliminated by 2 defeats with 0–1, in Athens and 3–2 in Braga. The second competition was the Balkans Cup, where they were placed in the Group B alongside Vardar, Lokomotiv Sofia and Farul Constanța. There, the team of Jenő Csaknády managed to finish first, undefeated, with 3 wins all of them at home and 3 draws away from home and were qualified for the 2-legged final, facing Fenerbahçe. In the first game at Nea Filadelfeia, AEK won by 2–1 thanks to the goals of Papaioannou and Sofianidis and went to Istanbul to defend their slight lead. The Turks managed to equalize the lead of the first leg, winning by 1–0 and since the away goals rule was not applied in the tournament, a third match was set. In order for a free date for the match to be found, 7 months had to pass and at Mithat Paşa, AEK were defeated by 3–1 and a lost a great opportunity to win an international trophy.

The following season they competed again in the Balkans Cup and with 1 win, 2 draws and 3 defeats they finished third in their respective group, behind Spartak Sofia, Olimpija Ljubljana, tied with Fenerbahçe.

=== 1968–69 European Cup quarter-finals campaign ===
As the 1968 champions, AEK played in the European Cup. The draw of the first round brought them against Jeunesse Esch. At Nea Filadelfeia, the yellow-blacks prevailed harder than the final 3–0 implied, with the goals of Papaioannou, Papageorgiou and Karafeskos and the rematch became purely procedural. At Luxembourg, the suspense of qualification didn't last long, since Ventouris equalized the quick goal of Hoffmann. AEK managed to take the lead with a second goal by Ventouris, but the players of Legrand showing character eventually turned the match again taking the victory. In the second round, AEK faced Akademisk Boldklub. At AEK Stadium, the yellow-blacks played defensively for the whole match and managed to take the draw by 0–0. In the rematch at Copenhagen, AEK started the match offensively and took the lead early on with Andreas Stamatiadis. The Danes started to press unbearably to equalize and the yellow-blacks took advantage of the open spaces left and played to extend their lead. Αt the 81st minute, after a cross by Sevastopoulos and Papaioannou beat everyone in the air and made the final 0–2. AEK became the first club in Greece to achieve an away victory in a European match and the first Greek team to reach the quarter-finals of a European competition. There, AEK avoided all the giants of the draw, as they faced Spartak Trnava. At the first match at Spartak Stadium, Branko Stanković set the team to maintain a favourable score for the rematch and despite withstanding the pressure by the Czechoslovaks, they conceded two goals with Jarábek and Kabát, but they managed to reduce their lead with Sevastopoulos and achieve their target. In the rematch at Athens, AEK seemed ready to take the qualification. Unfortunately, after a goal by Švec in the first half made the yellow-blacks chase the score, as the Czechoslovaks were closed behind. AEK attacked relentlessly, but the defense of Spartak seemed impenetrable, until Papaioannou managed to equalize. The team were left with only a few minutes to take the match to the extra time and despite their intensive pressure the ball eventually did not end up in the net and AEK were eliminated from the tournament achieving one of the greatest campaigns in their history.

=== Declining period and comeback ===
After an absence for a season from European football, in 1970 AEK Athens participated in the Inter-Cities Fairs Cup for the first time in their history, drawing for its first round against the newly-formed Twente and were eliminated with 2 goalless defeats at both legs, with 1–0 at home and 3–0 away from home. Despite the club winning the championship of that season, the issues which appeared within the club marked the beginning of a declining period.

Nevertheless, in the first round of the 1971–72 European Cup, AEK faced the great Internazionale of Ivano Bordon, Giacinto Facchetti and Sandro Mazzola. In the first match at San Siro, AEK managed to take the lead with Pomonis, but Inter's superiority was obvious and turned the game to 4–1 with Jair, Mazzola, Facchetti and Boninsegna. In the rematch at AEK Stadium everything started wrong for the yellow-blacks, as they were left behind with a goal by Mazzola, but Bertini's dismissal brought AEK in taking the lead at the half time with Ventouris and Papaioannou. The nerazzurri, wanting if nothing else not to lose, chased the goal and equalized with Boninsegna and the players of AEK, realizing that the qualification was lost definitively, sought the victory and achieved it with a goal by Kostas Nikolaidis, that made the final 3–2. This victory was widely celebrated as it was one of the greatest in Greek football at the time, while Inter eventually reached the final of the tournament.

In 1972, AEK participated in the UEFA Cup for the first time in their history. In the first round, they were drawn against the Salgótarján, where they easily prevailed with a 3–1 win at home and in a purely procedural rematch with a 1–1 draw away from home. In the second round, luck completely turned its back on AEK, bringing them against Liverpool of Bill Shankly. The first match at Anfield, the reds easily took the victory with 3–0 and finished the job with a 3–1 win in Athens, which sent them in the eventual conquest of the title.

As AEK were passing through their declining period, were out of claiming titles and were left out of the European competitions for 2 seasons. A new era begun at the club, when Loukas Barlos took over the presidency of the club and marked their return to European competitions in 1975. For the first round of UEFA Cup, AEK were drawn against Vojvodina and after the 0–0 away from home, they confirmed their superiority with the 3–1 win at home. In the second round, the draw brought AEK against Inter Bratislava, where they faced defeat by 2–0, while in the rematch at Nea Filadelfeia, the Czechoslovaks opened the score early on and even though the yellow-blacks turned the game, the three goals they scored, were not enough, as they were eliminated on away goals.

=== 1976–77 UEFA Cup semi-finals campaign ===
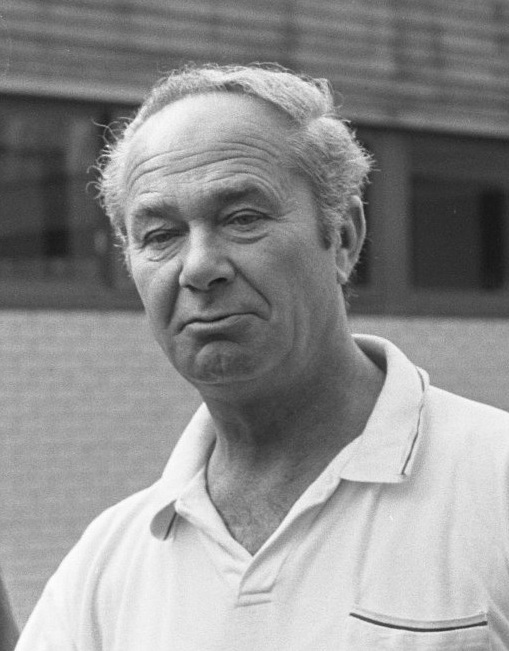
František Fadrhonc

Lineup against QPR (1977-03-02)

The club's most memorable moment in European competitions was their campaign in the UEFA Cup, of the 1976–77 season. In the first round they faced Soviet champions, Dynamo Moscow. In Athens, AEK won 2–0 with goals by Takis Nikoloudis and Mimis Papaioannou. In Moscow, Dynamo paid them back by equalizing the score of the first game, leading the match to extra time. In the last minute of extra time, AEK managed to score thanks to a penalty kick by Tasos Konstantinou and proceeded to the second round. They were drawn against Derby County. In Nea Filadelfeia, a goal by Wagner and an own goal by Thomas gave AEK the 2–0 win. At Derby, AEK found themselves behind in the score line, but responded by scoring three times with Nikoloudis, Konstantinou and Wagner. Derby Country only managed to score a consolation goal and the match ended in a 2–3 win for AEK. That marked the first away victory over an English club in European history. In the third round AEK faced Red Star Belgrade. In Athens, AEK was once again victorious by winning 2–0 with the goals of Mimis Papaioannou and Thomas Mavros. In Belgrade, Red Star took the lead with a goal by Baralić but Wagner quickly equalized. The two additional goals scored by Filipović and Savić were not enough and AEK were qualified on away goals. In the quarter-finals, AEK faced their greatest challenge to that moment, QPR. The first leg was played in London. The two penalty kick goals in the first ten minutes scored by Francis and another one scored by Bowles gave QPR the 3–0 win and what looked like a certain qualification. Nevertheless, AEK made an impossible comeback and with two goals by Mavros and one more by Papaioannou AEK sent the match to extra time and eventually to a penalty shoot-out. Three minutes before the final whistle, František Fadrhonc had Nikos Christidis substitute Lakis Stergioudas, the team's regular goalkeeper. His move proved vital as Christidis saved two penalties and gave AEK a 7–6 win. In the semi-finals draw, AEK came across the Italian league's runner-up side, Juventus. In Turin, Juventus scored first with Cuccureddu, but AEK responded with a goal by Papadopoulos. Two goals by Bettega and one by Causio followed, giving the bianconeri a 4–1 victory. La Vecchia Signora also won in AEK Stadium thanks to a goal by Boninsegna end went on to win their first European title.

=== Later Barlos years ===

Lineup against Porto (1978-09-13)

As the club experienced great success under the presidency of Barlos, maintained a steady presence in UEFA's institutions. In the following season's UEFA Cup, they faced ASA Târgu Mureș, for the first round. In Romania, AEK presented a mediocre appearance, which was largely due to the tragic condition of the field and lost by 1–0, but in the replay match with an imposing performance they were qualified with a 3–0 victory. The draw for the second round brought AEK facing Standard Liège. Under their new manager, Zlatko Čajkovski, they faced difficulties against the Belgians who managed to leave the AEK Stadium with a 2–2 draw. The replay match found AEK unlucky, as they were left behind 1–0 by an own goal and even though they equalized, the exhaustion and the effectiveness of Standard Liège's offense found them with defeated by 4–1 and out of the continuation of the tournament.

In 1978, AEK returned in the European Cup after 6 years and came across Porto. In the first leg at Nea Filadelfeia, the Greek side achieved their greatest ever victory in the tournament and tearing their opponents by 6–1 with a brace of Dušan Bajević and the goals of Christos Ardizoglou, Tasos Konstantinou, Lakis Nikolaou and Thomas Mavros, with the Portuguese reducing with António Oliveira. In the rematch, the double-headed eagle opened the score with Mavros, sealing the qualification and in the end of the game they lowered their tempo and the dragons seized the opportunity scoring four goals with Vital, Teixeira and Gomes. Their opponent for the second round was Nottingham Forest. In Athens, the reds did not underestimate their opponents and with AEK being out with 10 players after the suspension of Viera, won by 1–2. In the rematch, AEK faced a difficult night which ended in a 5–1 imposing defeat and were eliminated by the team of Brian Clough who eventually won the trophy.

Having won their second championship in a row in 1979, AEK competed again in the European Cup facing Argeș Pitești for its first round. At the Stadionul 1 Mai, AEK were left with ten men, due to the dismissal of Damianidis and the Romanians got the victory with a relative safe score of 3–0. Despite the loss of the first match, AEK opened the score early on an own goal by Ivan and a second goal by Vladić, but a third goal that would equalize the score of the first match never came with the referee denying them a penalty in various occasions and the possibility of the qualification. The anger of the players and staff of AEK overflowed and the incidents that followed brought the punishment of AEK with a one-year ban from the UEFA competitions.

The following season, did not qualify in any UEFA competitions, thus they competed in the Balkans Cup instead. In the group stage, they were placed with Velež Mostar and Flamurtari where all three clubs were tied with 2 wins and 2 defeats, thus Velež Mostar were qualified to the final of the institution, due to their better goal ratio.

=== The post-Barlos instability ===

Lineup against Real Madrid (1985-09-18)

After the departure of Barlos in 1981, AEK Athens entered in a strange period, which would be marked by administrative instability and successive changes of managers. Having served their ban in 1982, AEK returned to UEFA competitions after 2 years of absence, participating in the UEFA Cup, had an unlucky draw that brought them against Köln. The first match of Athens initially was not to be completed due to the fire at Tatoi and the inevitable power outage of the stadium at the 88th minute without AEK being responsible. In the game, AEK took the lead early on, however the Germans turned the tie with the yellow-blacks responding and making it 3–2, but almost immediately were equalized, before the stadium was sunk into darkness. The referee decided in suspension of the game, which was scheduled to be repeated two weeks later. In the replay of the first leg AEK were defeated by 0–1, which made the qualification even harder. At Müngersdorfer Stadion, the team of Michels dominated throughout the game scoring 5 goals with the yellow-blacks unable to respond, with the image of the team being extremely disappointing.

Having won the cup of the previous season, AEK qualified for the first round of the Cup Winners' Cup facing Újpest. Despite the yellow-black's win in the first leg with 2–0 with Kottis and Ross being the scorers, they were eliminated by the Hungarians with a 4–1 defeat at Megyeri úti Stadion.

In 1985, after a year of absence, AEK returned in the European competitions and the UEFA Cup with their opponents being Real Madrid. At the Athens Olympic Stadium, AEK achieved one of the historic victories, as they beat the merengues with 1–0, thanks to the goal of Papaioannou and the help of Esterházy who feinted on the course on the ball. AEK became the first Greek club to defeat Real Madrid. In the second leg, however things did not end up so good for the yellow-blacks, suffering a 5–0 defeat at Santiago Bernabéu and were eliminated, as Real Madrid went in the eventual conquest of the title.

In the following season's UEFA Cup, AEK were again unlucky since they were drawn against Internazionale, with players such as Passarella, Rummenigge and Bergomi. At San Siro, the team stood with the demands, but in the second half, they conceded the two goals that shaped the final result. At AEK Stadium, the team of Trapattoni took the lead very quickly and ended the qualifying case.

=== The Dušan Bajević era ===

Lineup against Dynamo Dresden (1989-09-27)

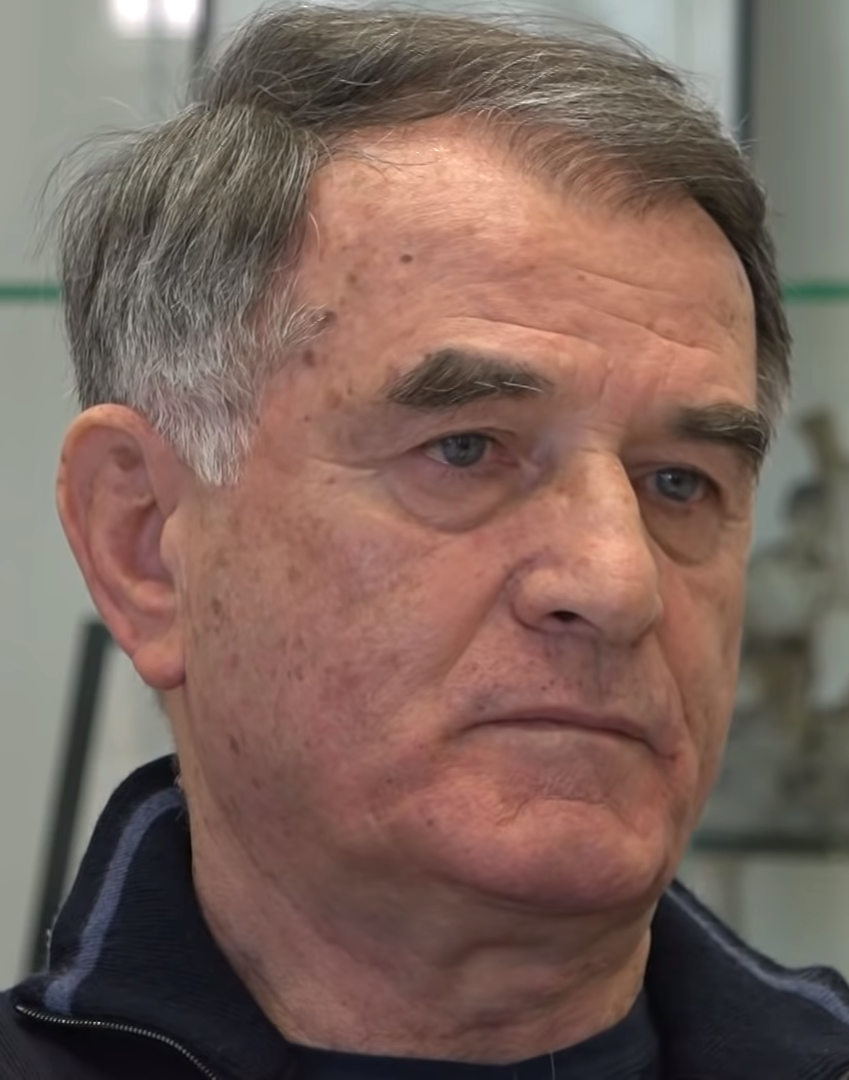
Dušan Bajević

With the arrival of the former player, Dušan Bajević as their new manager in 1988, AEK went back on track in stability on their European performances. The team returned in the UEFA Cup after a year of absence, where they played against Athletic Bilbao in the first round. In the first leg at AEK Stadium, AEK pressed from the start and managed to take an early lead with Pittas and the 1–0 remained until the final whistle. In the second leg, at San Mamès Stadium, AEK were stunned and conceded 2 quick goals by Uralde and by the end of the game the yellow-blacks were looking for the goal that would give them the qualification, which eventually never came. A highlight of the match was the human wall erected by the Basque fans to protect those of AEK from the Spanish police, a move that was appreciated by the Greek excursionists.

Lineup against PSV (1992-10-21)

In 1989, having won their first championship after 10 years, AEK returned in the European Cup playing against Dynamo Dresden where, despite the defeat in Germany by 1–0, with a magical performance in the rematch, were qualified with an incredible 5–3 victory with Manolas, Okoński, Savvidis and Savevski being the scorers for the Greek side. However, the draw for the second round brought them against Olympique de Marseille of Tapie. In the first match at Stade Vélodrome, the referee canceled a clean goal by Patikas and AEK lost 2–0 with Papin and an own goal by Manolas. In the rematch in Nea Filadelfeia the goals of Savevski and Papin formed the 1–1 draw, which left AEK out of the tournament. In addition the French reported an attack on their team bus and as a result UEFA punished AEK with one-year ban from all European competitions.

Lineup against Rangers (1994-08-24)

As soon as their ban was over, AEK returned to European competitions in 1991, participating in the UEFA Cup and were drawn for its first round with Vllaznia Shkodër. At Loro Boriçi Stadium, despite the pressure put by Vllaznia, AEK took the away victory by 0–1 with a goal by Dimitriadis, while the procedural rematch in Nikos Goumas Stadium ended 2–0 with Papaioannou and Batista being the scorers. The draw for the second round brought AEK against Spartak Moscow. In the first leg of Luzhniki Stadium they managed to achieve a difficult goalless draw against the Russians. In the second leg in Nea Filadelfeia, Spartak took the lead, but the yellow-blacks turned the game around with Batista and Dimitriadis and got away with the qualification. For the third round, AEK were drawn against Torino. In the first match at home, the team, despite taking the lead early on, found themselves behind before the end of the first half, but managed to equalize the game in the second half with Daniel Batista and Šabanadžović and the match ended at 2–2. AEK arrived in Turin pressing for a goal that would give them the qualification to the quarter-finals, however an impressive goal by Walter Casagrande, ended the qualification case. Several years later, the then general manager of Torino, was accused of having also influenced the referees in the club's European matches that season, securing favor for the Piedmontese club including the games against AEK.

In the summer of 1992 the European Cup changed their name to UEFA Champions League and AEK were the first Greek club to participate in it, facing APOEL for its first round. The Greek champions underestimated their opponents in the first leg at home and the goal of Alexandris being responded by that of Hadjiloukas in a 1–1 draw. In the second leg, AEK led relatively early by 2–0 with Šabanadžović and Alexandris, however, towards the end of the match they were equalized thanks to Gogić and Fasouliotis, but secured qualification to the second round on the away goals. AEK's next opponent was PSV Eindhoven of Romário. In the first leg in Greece, AEK took an impressive 1–0 win with a beautiful header by Dimitriadis. After the game, Romário declared that PSV would not face a problem in the rematch because he himself would score 3 goals and his "prophecy" came true at the Philips Stadion, as AEK were scattered with a score of 3–0, with the Brazilian scoring a hat-trick and the yellow-blacks were out of the tournament.

The next season, AEK were qualified again for the first round of the Champions League and were drawn against the Monaco. At Stade Louis II, the team of Wenger created many chances and got the win thanks to an own goal by Vlachos, while at Nikos Goumas Stadium, AEK found themselves back in the score with a goal by Djorkaeff, but managed to equalize with Slišković and they were eliminated from the tournament.

AEK, having won their third consecutive championship, entered the draw of the Champions League qualifiers in the summer of 1994, which brought them against Rangers. In Athens, Saravakos with two personal goals shaped the final 2–0. In the rematch at Ibrox Stadium, with a goal by Savevski, AEK achieved a historic victory and the qualification for the first appearance for a Greek club in the group stage of the tournament. AEK were placed in the very difficult group with Ajax, Milan and Casino Salzburg. AEK's journey to the Champions League begun with Casino Salzburg in Vienna. The Greek team played a closed match as did the Austrians and the match ended 0–0. In the next matchday Ajax came to Greece with all their stars and despite the pressure from the Dutch, AEK surprisingly took the lead with Savevski, however the team of Van Gaal quickly responded and eventually turned the game to the final 1–2 with Litmanen and Kluivert. In the next match it was the turn of Milan to visit Athens. AEK pressed hard the team of Capello, but several factors deprived them of the victory, sticking in the final 0–0. The now suspected Milan, welcomed AEK to the Stadio Nereo Rocco, due to punishment, with the yellow-blacks coming into the game again offensively and taking the lead thanks to the goal of Savevski. The rossoneri turned the game around with two set-pieces and the brace of Panucci and won the game with 2–1. In Athens, AEK lost any hopes of qualification in the following matchday, with an overall bad performance against Salzburg, as the Austrians took the lead twice with a brace of Pfeifenberger, the yellow-blacks responded with Vlachos but again the Austrians with the goal of Hasenhüttl made the final 1–3. In the final fixture against Ajax in Amsterdam, AEK were easily defeated with 2–0 with both goals scored by Oulida with the Dutch finishing in the top of the group undefeated. AEK finished fourth in the group with a total of 2 draws and 4 defeats, where Ajax and Milan who were qualified would eventually reach the final, with the former winning the trophy.

The following season, AEK participated in the UEFA Cup Winners' Cup after 12 years. In the first round, they were drawn against Sion, where they easily prevailed 2–0 at home thanks to the goals of Vlachos and Borbokis. In a procedural, but entertaining rematch at Stade Tourbillon the goals of Bonvin and Giallanza were responded with those of Ketsbaia and Batista in the final 2–2. In the second round, the draw brought the yellow-blacks against Borussia Mönchengladbach. The first match at Bökelbergstadion, Gladbach took a 4 goal lead with Dahlin, Pflipsen and Wynhoff with Maladenis reducing for AEK in a heavy 4–1 defeat. The Germans finished the job in Athens with a goal of Effenberg in a 0–1 win, which sent the Greek side out of the tournament.

=== Regular participation and notable campaigns ===
In 1996, with Bajević gone, AEK were redeeming their return to the elite of European football with good draws in the Cup Winners' Cup. For the first round their opponent were Chemlon Humenné and the yellow-blacks did not face any particular issues as they qualified with a 1–0 in Athens and 1–2 in Humenné. In the second round, AEK came across Olimpija Ljubljana and the team presented themselves extremely serious at the Bežigrad Stadium winning with 0–2 thanks to the goals of Christos Kostis and Temuri Ketsbaia. At Nea Filadelfeia they also prevailed with a spectacular 4–0 with Savevski, Maladenis, Batista and Kostis. AEK advanced to the quarter-finals and the draw brought the title holder, Paris Saint-Germain as their opponent. At Parc des Princes the Greek team managed to keep a clean sheet and got away with a 0–0. At Nikos Goumas Stadium, the yellow-blacks entered the match offensively, but in the 21st minute, the referee did not whistle Loko's foul on Vlachos and the Frenchman was left unmarked and scored. AEK tried to react, but the goal did not come and instead Loko sealed the qualification for PSG with 2 more goals, completing a hat-trick.

AEK, having won a second cup title in a row in 1997, played in the Cup Winners' Cup coming against Dinaburg. At Nikos Goumas Stadium, AEK easily prevailed with 5–0 with a brace of Charis Kopitsis and the goals of Evripidis Katsavos, Giannis Kalitzakis and Marcelo Veridiano and with the goals of Demis Nikolaidis, Michalis Vlachos and Christos Kostis, achieved a 4–2 win at Daugava Stadium and advanced to the next round. Their next opponent were Sturm Graz, where the yellow-blacks won with 2–0 at home with Marcelo and Batista, but at the expense of the serious injury of Christos Kostis, after a collision with Kazimierz Sidorczuk, effectively ending his career that night, as he never managed to return. The rematch at Arnold Schwarzenegger Stadium was difficult, as Sturm pressed, but managed nothing more than scoring a goal at the end of the match. AEK were in the quarter-finals for the second time in a row, where they faced Lokomotiv Moscow. At Nea Filadelfeia the team was not performing as expected and ended the match with 9 players with the match remaining at 0–0. AEK went to Moscow to qualify for the semi-finals and even though the hosts took the lead in the second half, they equalized a few minutes later. AEK had the qualification in their hands and had imposed themselves over Lokomotiv, as the Russians were pressing, they left their defense exposed, with the dangerous counterattacks of the yellow-blacks, not being converted into goals. At the 90th minute, Sebwe made a run with the ball at his feet, neutralized everyone and passed to Nikolaidis, who made a lifeless shot from the small area to an empty goal, which was caught by a Lokomotiv defender who came from behind and collected the ball. In the last chance of the match, Lokomotiv entered the area of AEK and after many counters, bad clearances and constant crosses the ball ended up in the net, leaving AEK unexpectedly out of the tournament in a qualification that would be historic.

In 1998, AEK Athens played for the second qualifying round of the UEFA Cup and were drawn against Ferencváros. At Stadion Albert Flórián, the yellow-blacks were swept away by the Magyars' pace and went the locker room with 2 goals behind with the continuation being as equally bad, as the score became 4–0. Nevertheless, AEK pulled off a reaction in the stoppage time and responded with two goals by Nikolaidis and Sebwe that allowed them not only to avoid humiliation, but also claiming the chances of qualifying in the rematch. In Nea Filadelfeia, AEK, led by Nikolaidis, who achieved a quick hat-trick, made the game take on a procedural nature and after the qualification was decided, the Greek side scored a fourth goal with Donis. The first round of the UEFA Cup brought AEK against the Vitesse of Nikos Machlas. At the GelreDome the yellow-blacks controlled the game in the first half, however a bad second half began with a missed penalty by Machlas, which Laros converted into a goal on the rebound, while three minutes later the Dutch made it 2–0 and afterwards Kasapis was sent-off. Machlas destroyed any hopes of qualification in stoppage time scoring Vitesse's third goal and AEK had their backs against the wall ahead of the rematch. In the Nea Filadelfeia Stadium, Machlas quickly put an end to the qualification case, Nikolaidis responded with a goal almost immediately, but again Machlas gave the Dutch the lead. Afterwards the game opened up and despite the dismissal of Westerfeld, Vitesse reached a third goal. AEK avoided defeat with the match ending in 3–3 draw with a second goal from Nikolaidis and the other from Kopitsis.

In the summer of 1999, amidst an atmosphere of excitement for the Champions League, AEK were drawn against AIK. The team of Ljubiša Tumbaković was not presented ready for the first leg at Nikos Goumas Stadium and the Swedish champions left with a 0–0 draw. In the second leg at Råsunda Stadium, AEK were more offensive, but an inactivity of Ilias Atmatsidis, costed them the presence in the group stage, as they conceded a goal by Nebojša Novaković, which made the final 1–0.

The disappointed AEK continued their European campaign in the UEFA Cup. They were drawn with Torpedo Kutaisi and in a bad match at Ramaz Shengelia Stadium, the yellow-blacks got the 1–0 victory, thanks to a goal by Akis Zikos. The rematch was a chance to cool off with a satisfying 6–1 with the goals of Ćirić, Bjeković, Maladenis, Kopitsis and Nikolaidis. Next stop for AEK was MTK Budapest and at the Hidegkuti Nándor Stadium were stymied by the Hungarians and fortunately after the goal of Ćirić, a nightmarish 2–0, turned into an attractive 2–1 defeat. The rematch in Nea Smyrni Stadium almost turned out to be a nightmare for AEK, since the well-prepared MTK, playing hard, managed to stress AEK, but Ćirić scored again, before the qualification was lost. Eventually, AEK entered the draw for the third round and came across Monaco. In a difficult match Monaco with the help of the referee, left Nea Filadelfeia with the precious 2–2 with a brace of Nikolaidis and the goals of Ludovic Giuly and Marco Simone for the Monégasques. In Louis De's second leg, AEK were as good as in the first game, as they fought and created the chances, but a miscalculation by Atmatsidis, brought the goal by Simone, with the rest of the game continued with yellow-blacks trying to equalize and Monaco limiting themselves to drugged counter-attacks to seal qualification. In the end, the 1–0 remained as it was and the new millennium found AEK out of the European competitions.

Lineup against Bayer Leverkusen (2000-11-23)

The next season AEK participated the first round of the UEFA Cup and were drawn against Vasas. At Ferenc Puskás Stadium, AEK scored 2 goals, while in the last minutes of the match were equalized. At Nikos Goumas Stadium, AEK appeared more serious and with Maladenis, being the protagonist of the match, scoring a goal and winning a penalty scored by Nikolaidis, won by 2–0. Their next opponent were Herfølge. First match in Athens, where Nikolaidis scored an impressive of 4 goals and Zikos scored another and AEK achieved an emphatic 5–0 victory. In the rematch, the Danes took the lead from early on with Jakobsen, AEK equalized with Petkov, but Herfølge again took the lead with a penalty and the match ended 2–1 with the Greek club taking the qualification. In the round of 32, AEK were drawn with Bayer Leverkusen, were in the top of the Bundesliga at that time. The first match at BayArena, the Greek team took the lead early on with Vasilios Lakis, but then conceded 2 goals thanks to Ulf Kirsten, they equalized with Fernando Navas, only for Bayer to made it 3–2 with Robert Kovač and the yellow-blacks equalizing again with a penalty of Vasilios Tsiartas. AEK made it 3–4 with the second goal by Navas and while the Germans continued to press hard, scoring a goal with Ramelow in the impressive 4–4 draw. The rematch of Nikos Goumas was an even more impressive night for AEK, who scored at the beginning of the match with Navas, while in the second half they doubled their lead with a direct free kick from Tsiartas and achieved a huge qualification win. In the round of 16, things became more difficult since AEK were drawn with Barcelona of Rivaldo, Patrick Kluivert, Overmars, Enrique, Guardiola and De Boer. In the first leg at Nea Filadelfeia, a mistake by the yellow-black defense in the first half was enough for the Blaugrana to score, where it remained until the end of the match. In the rematch at Camp Nou the Catalans crushed the Greek side with a wide score of 5–0 and ended their European run.

In 2001, AEK played for a third season in a row in the first round of the UEFA Cup and had a theoretically easy task, facing Grevenmacher. The first match took place at Nea Filadelfeia and AEK were storming and the 2 goals in the first half by Vasilios Tsiartas and Theodoros Zagorakis and another 4 in the second half by Demis Nikolaidis, Vasilios Lakis and Sotiris Konstantinidis, gave them an impressive 6–0 victory. In the rematch in Luxembourg, AEK didn't struggle at all with a goal in each half by Lakis and Konstantinidis. In the second round, AEK found the obstacle of Hibernian. The first match was played at home AEK took the lead with a penalty of Tsiartas and Nikolaidis doubled the lead in the final 2–0. At the Easter Road, Hibernian pressed AEK and with 2 goals by Luna equalized the score of the first match and the game went to extra-time, where Tsiartas showed his class and with 2 personal goals with a shot and a direct corner kick, gave AEK the qualification. All the Scots managed to do was to score a third goal with Zitelli, getting an honorable victory with 3–2. In the third round, the draw again favored AEK, who found in front of them Osijek. In the first match in Croatia, AEK entered the game strongly and took the lead with Zagorakis, while Nikolaidis made it 0–2, but immediately after that the Croatians reduced it to 1–2 with Mijatović. In the second leg in Athens, the team of Fernando Santos found themselves behind with an own goal by Ferrugem, but turned the score around with Lakis and Tsiartas to be leveled by the Croatians at 2–2 before half-time with the goal of Mitu. Eventually, a goal by Konstantinidis gave the yellow-blacks the 3–2 win and the qualification. In the next round, another theoretically passable opponent, Litex Lovech, was drawn against AEK. In the first match at Nikos Goumas Stadium, AEK came in impressively and scored 3 goals and with the Bulgarians reducing it to the final 3–2. In the rematch of Lovech Stadium, a goal by Carlos Gamarra brought AEK close to the qualification, who despite conceding a goal at the stoppage time by Stefan Yurukov, were already qualified. AEK reached the round of 16 for a second consecutive time and were drawn against Internazionale. The first match at Giuseppe Meazza started impressively for AEK, who took the lead with Zagorakis, but Inter quickly recovered and with two goals from Zanetti and Kallon, while their superiority was then sealed with another goal by Ventola in the final 3–1 and rematch became very difficult. In a packed Nikos Goumas Stadium, the yellow-blacks tried to press, but the nerazzurri in their first chance scored a goal with free-kick by Greško. The Greek club equalized with a header by Konstantinidis and overturned the score with Nikolaidis and brought the team just one goal away from extra-time, but the nerazzurri immediately equalized with Ventola, which shaped the final 2–2 and AEK's European course ended there.

=== 2002–03 UEFA Champions League unbeaten campaign ===

Lineup against Real Madrid (2002-10-02)

In the summer of 2002 they played against Cypriot champions, APOEL in the third qualifying round of the Champions League. In the first leg at Nicosia, the Cypriots scored first with Marinos Ouzounidis, but the yellow-blacks managed to take the lead with Vasilios Borbokis scoring twice. A late equalizer by Malekkos did not prove enough for APOEL, as Nikolaidis scored during stoppage time, giving his club the win. In Athens, AEK won thanks to a header by Mauricio Wright and entered the group stage, where they were drawn against the title holders, Real Madrid, Roma and Genk. AEK secured two goalless draws against Genk at Cristal Arena and against Roma at home before confronting Real Madrid. The defending champions were twice behind against the Greek side, as Vasilios Tsiartas became the first player to score against the Spanish side in this season's competition with a free-kick. However, the merengues were soon back on level thanks to Zidane's goal, before further goals from Maladenis and Nikolaidis put the hosts in the driving seat. However, another strike from Zidane and a third by Guti ensured Madrid left with a point in the final 3–3. An in a way opposite match was played in Madrid where Steve McManaman's two goals put Real in front during half time, but AEK equalized with goals by Kostas Katsouranis and Walter Centeno. In the next match in Athens, Genk scored first and AEK responded with Lakis, making the final 1–1. The group stage was concluded at Stadio Olimpico against Roma, where AEK was once again behind in the scoreline by a goal scored by Delvecchio, but managed to score a late equalizer with Centeno. The six draws AEK secured is a feat no other club has ever accomplished.

The team continued in the round of 32 of the UEFA Cup and smashed Israeli champions, Maccabi Haifa by achieving two of their biggest wins ever in European competitions. A 4–0 win with goals by Grigoris Georgatos, Demis Nikolaidis, Milen Petkov and Theodoros Zagorakis and the a 1–4 in Nicosia with the braces of Vasilios Lakis and Kostas Katsouranis and another by Dimitris Nalitzis. Walid Badir had earlier scored with a penalty for Maccabi. AEK's undefeated run was brought to an end in the round of 16 by Málaga, even though they drew 0–0 at La Rosaleda Stadium, lost by 0–1 at Nea Filadelfeia with a goal from Manu.

=== A new start ===
AEK, struggling with financial issues, had the opportunity to compete for the second consecutive season in the Champions League group stage, with Grasshopper standing on their way. At the Hardturm, the AEK did not appear ready and the Swiss had the upper hand and the match ended 1–0, with the things becoming difficult for the Greek team. The rematch at Leoforos Alexandras Stadium, AEK entered the match strongly and with 2 goals and an own goal got a qualifying score with all Grasshoppers could do was to score once. AEK were placed in the Group C alongside Monaco, Deportivo La Coruña and PSV Eindhoven. The first fixture was against the Spaniards in Athens. Deportivo entered the pitch better and took the lead with Pandiani, but in the end AEK responded with Tsiartas in the final 1-1. The next match in Monaco, the yellow-blacks were a mess and a result they lost with 4–0 with the goals of Giuly, Morientes and Pršo. For the third matchday, AEK faced PSV at Leoforos Alexandras and in a problematic game, the Greek side lost with 0–1. Next game against Eindhoven at Philips Stadium, AEK appeared again in a tragic situation and conceded 2 goals by Bouma and Robben and with the final 2–0 defeat were essentially out of the Champions League. For the 5th matchday on, the yellow-blacks were claiming their chances to continue in UEFA, however another terrible performance led them to a 3–0 defeat by La Coruña at Estadio Riazor. Being out of Europe, AEK welcomed Monaco for the final fixture in a goalless draw, with the yellow-blacks finishing 4th in their group without a win and the Monégasques eventually reaching the final of the tournament.

Barely securing their licence by UEFA, AEK had the chance to play in the group stage of the UEFA Cup facing the obstacle of Gorica. The game at Sports Park went wrong from the beginning, as AEK conceded a goal with Rodić, but equalized in the final 1–1 with Katsouranis. The rematch was played in Georgios Kamaras Stadium, the yellow-blacks won with 1–0 thanks to a goal by Soares and advanced to the group stage. There, in a relatively difficult draw, they found themselves in the same group as Sevilla, Lille, Zenit Saint Petersburg and Alemannia Aachen, where they had a very bad campaign with 4 defeats in equal matches, thus stayed out of the continuation of the tournament.

Just one year after the first meeting between the two teams, fortune again brought Zenit Saint Petersburg to the road of AEK in 2005 for the UEFA Cup. This time, AEK were careful defensively and managed to leave Petrovsky Stadium with a goalless draw. The rematch of Olympic Stadium the yellow-blacks again approached the game in the same way as the first leg and as the game was heading to extra time, Andrey Arshavin, with a solo effort scored for the Russians. The final result was 0–1 and AEK were out of European competitions.

Lineup against Milan (2006-11-21)

In the summer of 2006, AEK's chance for participation in the groups of the Champions League passed through the matches with Hearts. At Murrayfield Stadium, AEK entered offensively and despite conceding a goal with Saulius Mikoliūnas, they made the comeback thanks to the goals of Pantelis Kapetanos and Nikos Liberopoulos. In Athens, AEK's superiority was clear from the start and with a goal of Liberopoulos and a brace by César sealed qualification with a 3–0 win. AEK competed again in Champions League group stage after 3 years and were drawn in the Group H with Milan, Lille and Anderlecht. The first game was extremely difficult against Milan at San Siro, were the yellow-blacks couldn't do more that a 3–0 defeat with the goals of Filippo Inzaghi, Yoann Gourcuff and Kaká. For the second matchday, AEK faced Anderlecht at the Athens Olympic Stadium. The Greek club played with many absences and conceded a goal with Frutos, but quickly responded with César in the final 1–1. Next match against Lille in France, where AEK faced a 3–1 defeat. The following fixture was the turn of AEK to face Lille in Athens. The yellow-blacks with a passionate performance and combined with the dismissal of Tavlaridis, made their first win in the group stage of the tournament thanks to a goal by Liberopoulos. A big night awaited AEK, who faced Milan at home for the next match. In an electrified atmosphere and with an excellent appearance, AEK got the huge win by 1–0 with a free-kick by Júlio César, while Stefano Sorrentino with an amazing performance kept the clean seat. The Greek club traveled to Belgium to face Anderlecht for the last game of the group stage in order to qualify for the next round. AEK entered the match better, however Anderlecht woke-up and scored twice with Vanden Borre and Frutos. Afterwards, AEK took their risks and eventually equalized the game with Lakis and Cirillo. Unfortunately for AEK, in the other match of the group, the indidderent Milan lost to Lille at home, leaving AEK with a marginal elimination from the next phase of the Champions League and in the UEFA Cup. There, AEK were drawn with Paris Saint-Germain for the round of 32. They suffered 2 defeats with the same score of 2–0 in both legs and were eliminated.

The following summer, the draw for the third qualifying round of the Champions League brought the Sevilla against AEK. AEK had a positive presence at Ramón Sánchez Pizjuán Stadium, but lost with the goals of Fabiano and Kanouté. The rematch was overshadowed by the tragedy of the death of Antonio Puerta. In the game, AEK put a lot of pressure on Sevilla, eventually conceded 4 goals Fabiano, Keita and Kerzhakov, only to reduce with Rivaldo in the heavy 1–4 defeat and continued in the UEFA Cup. There, AEK were drawn with Red Bull Salzburg. In Athens, AEK took the lead early in the match with Geraldo Alves and later on AEK doubled the lead the goal-poem from Rivaldo and secured the qualification with a third goal by Kone. At the Red Bull Arena, Salzburg's goal put the qualification in danger, but AEK defended properly, kept the difference from the first leg and advanced to the group stage. There, they met Villarreal, Fiorentina, Mladá Boleslav and Elfsborg. A poor and lackluster AEK lined up at Boras Arena, where they found themselves back on the scoresheet, but managed to equalize in the final 1–1. In the second matchday, it is time for Fiorentina, to visit Athens. The Viola took advantage an error of the yellow-blacks and took the lead, but they were quickly equalized with the score remaining as it was until the end. The penultimate matchday against was Mladá Boleslav at Městský stadion and in a bad game AEK emerged victorious with 0–1 thanks to Nsaliwa. The last matchday of the group and AEK welcomed the indifferent Villarreal. The submarines were better throughout the match and took the lead with Mavuba with AEK reacting with a goal from direct free-kick by Rivaldo, but almost immediately were behind with the goal of Tomasson. Despite the 1–2 loss, Fiorentina beat Mladá as expected in the other match and AEK were qualified for the next stage as third in the group. In the round of 32 of the UEFA Cup, AEK were drawn against Getafe. In Athens, Getafe took the lead with Rubén de la Red with AEK closing the Spaniards in their area, reaching an equalizer with a back-heel goal from Ismael Blanco. At the Coliseum Alfonso Pérez, AEK in one of their worst nights, were easily defeated by 3–0 and ended their European campaign.

In August 2008, AEK played against Omonia for the second qualifying round of the UEFA Cup. In Athens, the Cypriots took the lead and eventually the victory against a mediocre AEK. The elimination for the yellow-blacks was completed in the second leg at GSP Stadium, where Omonia limited them again, taking the lead with Duro and despite being equalized by a goal of Blanco, did not lose control of the match, regaining the lead with the same scorer. AEK only managed to avoid a second defeat by equalizing at the end of the match with Pavlis.

=== Financial struggle and regeneration ===

Lineup against Benfica (2010-01-09)

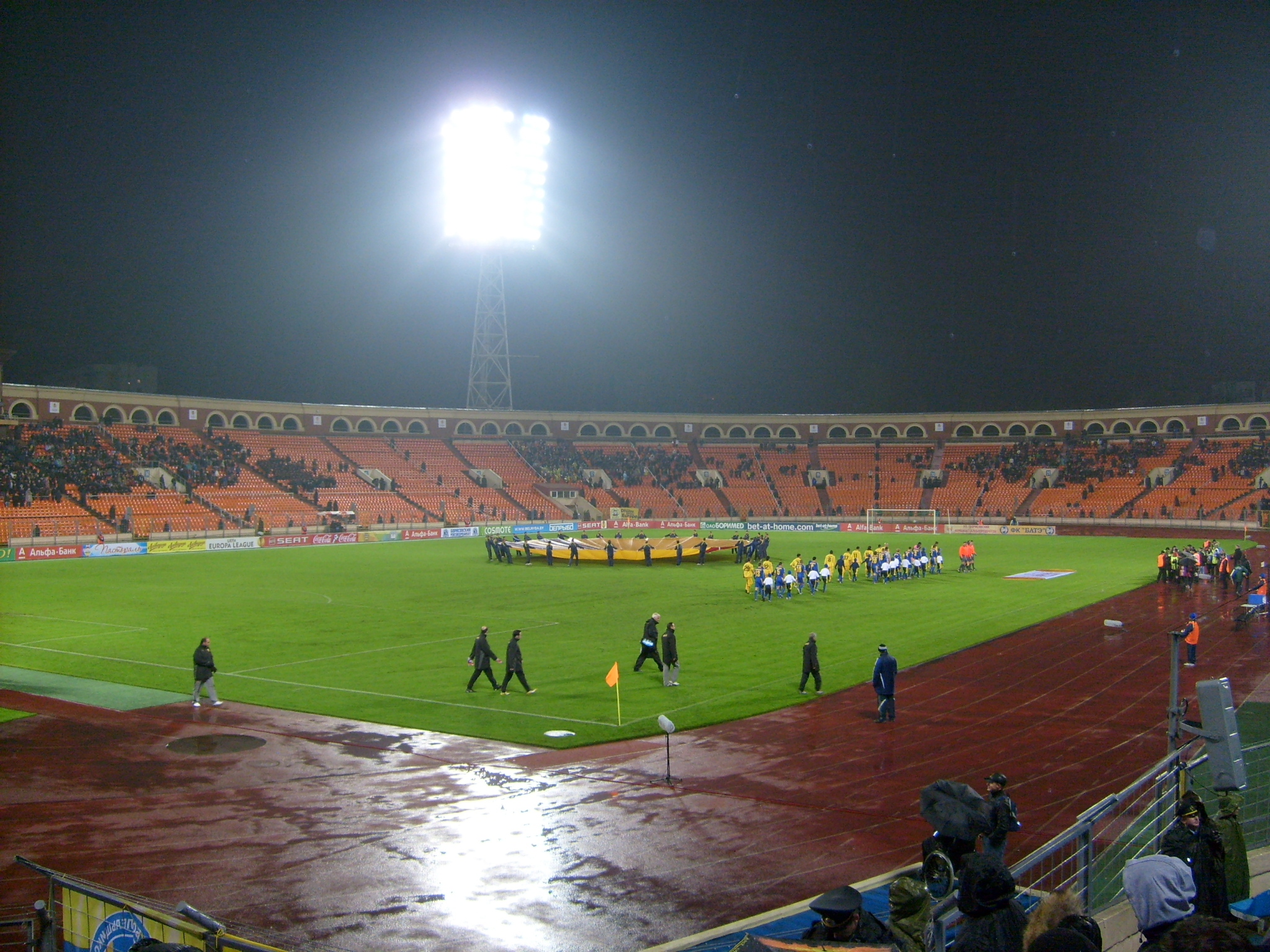
AEK Athens at Dinamo Stadium, Minsk

In 2009, AEK participated in the qualifiers of the newly-formed UEFA Europa League, facing Vaslui. At the Municipal Vaslui, AEK started by controlling the tempo and ended the half trailing with 1–0. Afterwards, they increased their tempo and equalized, but the issues in their transition cost them, as Vaslui scored in the final minutes to make the final 2–1. At the Olympic Stadium the Romanians played defensively, but when AEK opened the score and the visitors were forced to play out in front. From that moment on, Scocco with 2 beautiful goals formed the emphatic 3–0, giving AEK the ticket to the group stage. There, AEK were placed in the Group I, with Benfica, Everton and BATE Borisov. The Union began their journey by traveling to Goodison Park to face Everton. AEK failed to do anything in the match and lost hands down with 4―0. In the following fixture AEK welcomed Benfica. After an ambiguous game the Greek club achieved a great 1–0 victory with a header by Majstorović. In the third matchday and the yellow-blacks faced BATE at Belarus, in a game that, in addition to the cold and bad pitch, had to deal with bad refereeing and bad luck, ended in a 2–1 loss for the Greek side. Afterwards in Athens, AEK, who took the lead against Bate at 14 seconds of the game with Blanco, but the Belarusians turned the tie with Rodionov and Volodko, with all the yellow-blacks could do was to equalize in 2–2 with Manduca. At the Olympic Stadium, Everton took the lead early on with a goal by Bilyaletdinov and that remained as the final score and AEK were mathematically out of the tournament. Last match for the indifferent AEK at Estádio da Luz. The eagles of Benfica took the lead with a brace from Di María and the double-headed eagle responded with Blanco forming the final 2–1, ending their season in Europe with a defeat.

The next season, AEK played for the Europa League's play-off round against the Dundee United. At Tannadice Park AEK, despite their mediocre performance, came away with a 1―0 win, with a quick goal by Djebbour. After a strange course of events the rematch was played at Karaiskakis Stadium, with the presence of only the Dundee fans, where, AEK took the lead with Diop. With the team's performance dropping increasingly, the Scots equalized with Daly and the Greek team marginally took the qualification. AEK were drawn in Group G alongside Zenit Saint Petersburg, Anderlecht and Hajduk Split. Hajduk came to the Olympic Stadium for the first matchday, where AEK started strong and took the lead. Afterwards the Croatians equalized, but the response was immense as the Greek club cleared the match with 3–1. For the second matchday AEK traveled to St. Petersburg to face Zenit. The performance of the yellow-blacks was bad and they conclusively lost by 4–2. AEK went to the Constant Vanden Stock Stadium, to play for the qualification against Anderlecht. Everything went wrong in the game, AEK were defeated by 3–0 and the qualification became difficult. AEK welcomed the Belgians in the 4th matchday. They started the game offensively, took the lead but Anderlecht managed to equalized with the score remaining as it was. With their backs against the wall, AEK entered the Stadion Poljud. AEK imposed their game and scored with Scocco, Manolas and Blanco. All the Croatians manage to achieve was to reduce in the final 1–3. The qualification has come closer, since Zenit beat Anderlecht 3–1 in the other game and AEK were looking for a point in the last matchday. In Athens against Zenit, AEK entered the match offensively, missing a penalty, with the Russians scoring in their first chance. The game continued with the desperate attacks of the yellow-blacks, which Zenit took advantage and scored twice in the counter. Their 0–3 defeat combimbined with the Anderlecht's victory in the other match, resulted in the elimination of AEK on the tie with the Belgians.

In the following season's Europa League, AEK were drawn with Dinamo Tbilisi, for its play-off round. In the first match at the Olympic Stadium, the yellow-blacks missed several chances, until José Carlos redeemed the team in the last minutes of the match, making the final 1–0. In the replay at the Boris Paichadze National Stadium, AEK entered the match badly and conceded a goal in the first minute and the match eventually went to the extra time. There, Guðjohnsen was tackled inside the area and the referee indicated a penalty, where Leonardo converted into a goal and formed the final 1–1, which gave AEK the qualification. In the group stage, AEK were drawn along with Anderlecht, Lokomotiv Moscow and Sturm Graz. After a terrible run with 5 consecutive defeats, all they managed was to finish third on the tie, with their only victory in the indifferent game in the last matchday against Strum.

In the summer of 2012, AEK, in the brink of bankruptcy, despite they secured their participation to the Europa League, the non-licensing by UEFA resulted in their absence from Europe after 21 years. At the end of the season, AEK were relegated and declared bankruptcy in order to be cleared of their debts and played in the third division. Thus the club was not able to qualify for any UEFA competition for another 3 seasons.

AEK's comeback in the top division was combined with the conquest of the cup, meaning their return to the third qualifying round of the Europa League as well, facing Saint-Étienne. In the first leg at the Stade Geoffroy-Guichard, AEK fought the game to a 0–0, while in the second leg at the Olympic Stadium, they conceded an early goal and they were eliminated, since the stéphanois kept the score until the end.

=== 2017–18 UEFA Europa League unbeaten campaign ===

Lineup against Club Brugge (2017-08-24)

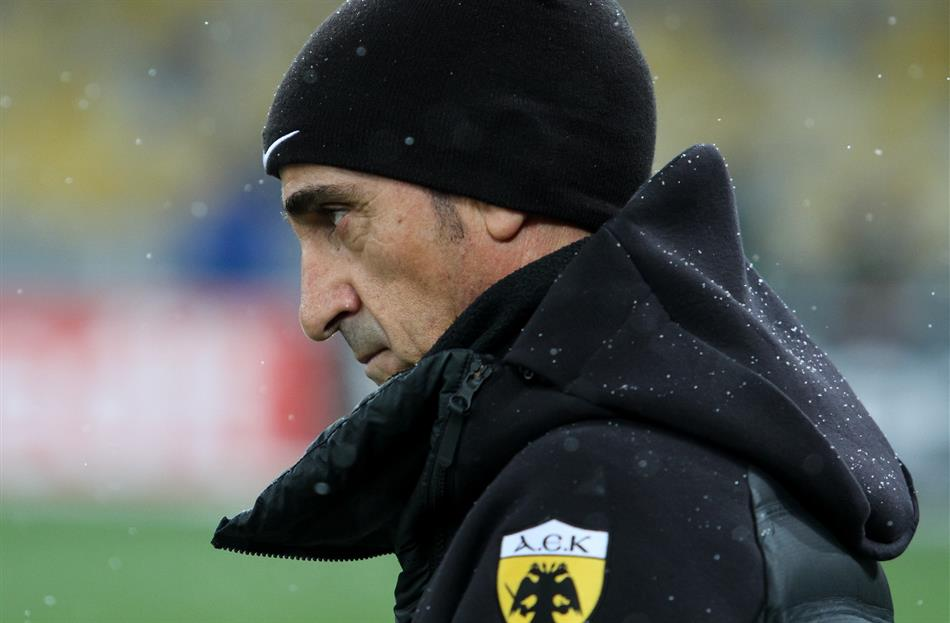
Manolo Jiménez

In the summer of 2017, after getting eliminated by CSKA Moscow with 2 goalless defeats for the third qualifying round of the UEFA Champions League, AEK Athens were drawn in the play-off round of the UEFA Europa League against Club Brugge. They appeared well-prepared against their opponent and in the first match at the Jan Breydel Stadium they easily held the 0–0, despite being down to 10 men during the second half, due the suspension of Livaja. In the rematch at the Olympic Stadium, AEK in one of their best European appearances in recent years turned the qualifying event into a triumph, by winning by 3–0 with a goal by Christodoulopoulos and two more by Simões, dominating their opponents throughout the match. Thus, the team made their return to the group stage of the Europa League after 6 years.

AEK were placed in Group D, alongside Milan, Rijeka and Austria Wien. In the first matchday at Stadion Rujevica, the yellow-blacks took the lead early on with Mantalos, but in the only chance found in the game Rijeka equalized with Elez only for Christodoulopoulos to form the final 1–2 win with a free-kick. In Athens, the Greek club again were ahead early on with Livaja, but this time Austria Wien managed to turn the game with Monschein and Tajouri-Shradi. AEK pressed hard and a second goal by Livaja at the end of the game made the final 2–2. The following matchday, AEK visited San Siro and with an impressive defensive performance escaped with a goalless draw, with Anestis making it to the team of the week. In the rematch at the Olympic Stadium, the yellow-blacks managed to lock the rossoneri with the match again ending 0–0. In the same stadium against Rijeka, AEK entered the pitch numbly and were punished with 2 goals by Gorgon. After that the yellow-blacks "woke-up" and pressed hard finding a goal with Araujo at the end of the first half and refusing to lose, scored another with Lazaros Christodoulopoulos and despite pressing for a third, the match ended 2–2. In the final matchday, AEK went to Ernst-Happel-Stadion with the purpose of not losing in order to advance to next phase. After a very anxious match, the yellow-blacks managed again another clean seat after a 0–0 and were qualified undefeated to the round of 32 after ten years.

In the round of 32, they were drawn against Dynamo Kyiv. In the first game in Athens, AEK entered strongly, but they conceded a goal by Tsyhankov in the only chance of Dynamo in the match and then the Ukrainians were closed in their area with the yellow-blacks pressing relentlessly and equalizing at the end of the match with Christodoulopoulos. With no easy task, AEK traveled to NSC Olimpiyskiy, where they pressed Dynamo, who were playing to keep the qualification score. The yellow-blacks missed big chances, but the goal never came and AEK were eliminated undefeated with a 10-match unbeaten run in the UEFA competitions.

=== Later years ===
As the last year's champions, AEK returned in the Champions League qualifiers, where they were drawn against Celtic. At Celtic Park the yellow-blacks found themselves behind early on with McGregor, but managed to level the game with Klonaridis and despite the dismissal of Galanopoulos, they managed to keep the final 1–1. In the rematch at the Olympic Stadium, AEK managed to dominate the game, quickly took the lead with 2 goals at the beginning of each half and played to keep the score with the Scots pressing, but all they managed was to go down in the final 2–1. AEK were a breath away from the group stage with their only obstacle being the Hungarian champions, MOL Vidi. In the match of Groupama Arena, AEK pressed their opponent, managing to take an easy lead with 2 goals by Klonaridis and Bakasetas, with the later being sent-off minutes later and from there on the roles were reversed with Vidi constantly pressing and scoring a goal with Lazović that put them back in the qualification game. With AEK having a favorable 2–1 score from the first leg, they went into the second leg playing conservatively and at a low tempo, keeping control of the game, where they won a penalty and Mantalos made the 1–0, with the Hungarians then gaining ground on the pitch and equalizing with Nego in a moment of inactivity of the Greek defense. AEK continued to freeze the tempo and after were left with 10 players, they just waited for the match to end. The final whistle found AEK in the Champions' League group stage and Livaja receiving an unacceptable red card for attacking an opponent player, as well as a 4-match ban. After that match, AEK completed a 14-game unbeaten streak in the UEFA competitions, breaking their previous record for the longest unbeaten run in Europe for a Greek team. They were placed in Group E along with Bayern Munich, Benfica and Ajax. Having an impossible task, AEK lost all six matches and ended their European campaign.

In the following season's Europa League, AEK passed for the third qualifying round facing Universitatea Craiova. Both matches were played behind closed doors as punishment for incidents. In an empty Stadionul Ion Oblemenco AEK initially could not threaten the Romanians, but with the entrance of Livaja, who with one goal and one assist made the final 0–2 win. In the empty as well Olympic Stadium, due to the club's punishment for the previous season's incidents, AEK took the lead early on, but afterwards there everyone eased up, with Craiova not only managing to equalize, but missing a lot of opportunities to take the lead, with the score eventually remaining at 1–1. In the play-offs, AEK were drawn against the Trabzonspor. In Athens, AEK made dream start with an early goal by Livaja, with the Turks equalizing later on, resulting the collapsed of the yellow-blacks and an easy 1–3 defeat. The crushing failure in the match combined with the second consecutive home defeat in the league, resulted in the sacking the manager Miguel Cardoso, who was replaced by Nikos Kostenoglou. Thus, AEK went to Şenol Güneş Stadium and after a great performance, dominated their opponents and won by 0–2, losing the qualification on away goals.

In the summer of 2020, due to a busy schedule and the consequences of the COVID-19 pandemic, UEFA decided that the matches of the qualifying rounds as well as the play-off rounds of their competitions would be single-legged, while all the games of the season were in front of empty stands. Thus, the draw for the third qualifying round of the Europa League brought AEK facing St. Gallen. The match was set to be played at Kybunpark and in an uneventful match, AEK had the initiative, while García's entrance in gave them a boost they needed and at the 73rd minute the Greek club won a penalty, which was taken by Oliveira. The goalkeeper saved the penalty, but in the rebound the Portoguese striker scored with a header, making the final 0–1. In the play-off round, AEK were drawn to face Wolfsburg at home. The yellow-blacks started well, missing a penalty, after that the Germans started to press and took the lead by the end of half-time. AEK did not give up the match and equalized with a stunning shot from Simões, while in the last counterattack of the match, Livaja served a precision ball to Ansarifard, who made the 2–1, giving AEK the qualification to the group stage. UEFA's draw placed AEK Athens in Group G, alongside Braga, Leicester City and Zorya Luhansk. In the first match at Estadio Municipal de Braga. AEK lasted for 44 minutes before collapsing and eventually lost 3–0 by Braga with their hands down. In Athens they faced Leicester and despite their bad start, where they conceded two goals, the yellow-blacks pressed hard making the final 1–2, losing chances to equalize. AEK played one of the best games of their season with an imposing performance against Zorya, who defeated by 1–4 at Slavutych-Arena, keeping alive the hopes of qualification. The Ukrainians took their revenge against AEK in the following fixture by repaying them with a 0–3 at the Olympic Stadium and ended their hopes of qualification. The Greek side faced another terrible home defeat at the hands of Braga, losing by 2–4. In the final matchday, AEK traveled to King Power Stadium to make a "chore" of the match, losing by 2–0 and finishing last in their group.

The next season found AEK in the second qualifying round of the Europa Conference League, facing Velež Mostar, a relative "unknown" club in Europe. The first leg took place at Stadion Grbavica, AEK entered the match well and managed to take an early lead with Ansarifard, but a mistake by Tsintotas brought the quick equalization for Velež. AEK looked superior and should have taken the lead again, but a second goal by Ansarifard was wrongly ruled out for offside. As time went on, the Bosnians started to increase their performance and eventually made the final 2–1, that put AEK in trouble. It was the first season that UEFA approved the proposal to abolish the away goals rule in all their competitions, thus the Greek club needed two goals to qualify at the normal time. The rematch from the beginning was a monologue for AEK, but the Bosnians did not leave any free spaces, but in the final minutes of the stoppage time a goal by Mantalos, sent the match went to extra time. Without anything changing, the match eventually went to penalty shootout, where one of the most humiliating eliminations in the European history of AEK took place, as they lost 2–3.

In the summer of 2023, having won the domestic double, AEK returned in the European comptetitons, playing in third qualifying round of the Champions League, where they were drawn against Dinamo Zagreb. On the eve of the first leg at Nea Filadelfeia, 100 ultras of the Croatian team, joined by Greek ultras, crossed the country unmolested and attacked the fans of AEK outside the stadium, which resulted in the murder of a supporter of AEK. In the aftermath of these events, UEFA decided not to impose sanctions on the Croatian team, but to postpone the match, which was moved as the second leg of the tie. Thus, in a state of shock, AEK played their first match at Stadion Maksimir and after a sluggish first half they were left behind by 1–0. However, in the second half they played decisively, equalized with Steven Zuber and in the final minutes of the match they managed to complete the comeback with Galanopoulos, who scored the winning goal and raised the black armband towards the Croatian ultras. At Agia Sophia Stadium, they were again left behind 0–2 by the 65th minute. AEK pressed and managed to score with Araujo and as the match was leading to extra time the yellow-blacks won a penalty, which was the last chance of the match. Livaković saved the penalty by García, however Vida scored on the rebound and AEK snatched the qualification. Since UEFA did not accept any changes to their schedule, AEK traveled to Bosuilstadion three days later to face Royal Antwerp for the play-off round. Even though they created several chances, they were defeated by 1–0, due to an early goal by the Belgian champions. In the second leg, at Agia Sophia Stadium, AEK had the upper hand for most of the game, but Antwerp managed to keep the pressure on and eventually got away with a 1–2 win, which sent the yellow-blacks to the group stage of the Europa League.

Lineup against Brighton (2023-09-21)

AEK were placed in Group B, with Ajax, Marseille and Brighton & Hove Albion. Firstly they travelled to Falmer Stadium to face Brighton, who at that time were the most in-form club in the Premier League, who played their first European match. AEK had to compete with only one central defender due to absences. The yellow-blacks entered the match aggressively and they opened the score early on with an impressive header by Sidibé. Brighton managed to equalize with a penalty, but AEK was in control of the match and took the lead again with Gaćinović. In the second half, the Englishmen again managed to equalize with a penalty, but the Greek club managed to win the match after a goal by Ponce. Afterwards, AEK were imposing on Ajax at Nea Filadelfia, but failed to capitalize on their opportunities. The Dutch took the lead in the first half with a penalty, the yellow-blacks equalized with Vida and a miss by Jønsson kept the final 1–1. In the following matchday at Velodrome, Marseille pressed and took the lead with Vitinha. AEK responded with Pineda, but a mistake by Stanković resulted in a penalty and red card. Marseille eventually won by 3–1. In the rematch, Marseille took control of the match and won by 0–2. In Nea Filadelfeia AEK hosted Brighton and were superior to the English team, but once again failed lost 0–1 by yet another penalty of João Pedro. Thus, AEK had to not lose at Amsterdam in order to continue in the Conference League. The match went wrong from the start, as the team of Almeyda found themselves behind and despite finding a quick equalizer they were eliminated by losing 3–1.

Ιn the following season, AEK played in the Conference League facing Inter Club d'Escaldes. In Athens, AEK entered the game strongly scored four goals, however, the club from Andorra took advantage of their mistakes and made it 4–3. At Estadi Nacional, prevailed by 0–3 with a hat-trick by García. In the following round, AEK traveled to Armavir City Stadium facing Noah. The yellow-blacks underestimated the Armenian club and even though they took the lead, Noah took advantage of the mistakes in the defense and the strong wind and took a 3–1 win. After their humiliating defeat they played at Nea Filadelfeia without any striker. Despite dominating the match, AEK won by a poor 1–0 which resulted in another painful elimination for the club.

== Overall record ==
Competition	Total								Home								Away							
Competition	Pld	W	D	L	GF	GA	GD	Win%	Pld	W	D	L	GF	GA	GD	Win%	Pld	W	D	L	GF	GA	GD	Win%
European Cup / UEFA Champions League	84	21	24	39	93	135	−42	25.00	42	15	16	11	61	48	+13	35.71	42	6	8	28	32	87	−55	14.29
European Cup (up to 1991–92)	20	6	4	10	33	42	−9	30.00	10	5	4	1	23	11	+12	50.00	10	1	0	9	10	31	−21	10.00
UEFA Champions League (since 1992–93)	64	15	20	29	60	93	−33	23.44	32	10	12	10	38	37	+1	31.25	32	5	8	19	22	56	−34	15.63
European Cup Winners' Cup / UEFA Cup Winners' Cup	22	10	3	9	33	27	+6	45.45	11	7	1	3	18	5	+13	63.64	11	3	2	6	15	22	−7	27.27
European Cup Winners' Cup (up to 1993–94)	6	2	0	4	7	11	−4	33.33	3	2	0	1	4	1	+3	66.67	3	0	0	3	3	10	−7	0.00
UEFA Cup Winners' Cup (since 1994–95)	16	8	3	5	26	16	+10	50.00	8	5	1	2	14	4	+10	62.50	8	3	2	3	12	12	+0	37.50
UEFA Cup / UEFA Europa League	142	47	33	62	187	212	−25	33.10	71	31	16	24	115	79	+36	43.66	71	16	17	38	72	133	−61	22.54
UEFA Cup (up to 2008–09)	88	32	18	38	125	130	−5	36.36	44	25	7	12	84	39	+45	56.82	44	7	11	26	41	91	−50	15.91
UEFA Europa League (since 2009–10)	54	15	15	24	62	82	−20	27.78	27	6	9	12	31	40	−9	22.22	27	9	6	12	31	42	−11	33.33
UEFA Europa Conference League (since 2021–22)	22	13	4	5	42	25	+17	59.09	11	9	1	1	25	10	+15	81.82	11	4	3	4	17	15	+2	36.36
Inter-Cities Fairs Cup (up to 1970–71)	2	0	0	2	0	4	−4	0.00	1	0	0	1	0	1	−1	0.00	1	0	0	1	0	3	−3	0.00
Balkans Cup (up to 1980–81)	27	8	6	13	35	53	−18	29.63	13	8	2	3	23	18	+5	61.54	14	0	4	10	12	35	−23	0.00
Total	299	99	70	130	390	456	−66	33.11	149	70	36	43	242	161	+81	46.98	150	29	34	87	148	295	−147	19.33

Last updated: 4 November 2026
Source: aekfc.gr

- Last entry is the match against Real Madrid for the 2026–27 Champions League league phase.
- The record after the last entry is 299 matches in total (99W, 70D, 130L, GF390, GA456), with 149 home matches (70W, 36D, 43L, GF242, GA161) and 150 away matches (29W, 34D, 87L, GF148, GA295).

=== Historical progression by competition ===
Historical progression by competition
Stage qualification
Stage elimination
Stage in progress

European Cup / UEFA Champions League
Season	Preliminary round				First round	Quarter-finals	Semi-finals	Final
1963–64	(France) Monaco							
Season	Preliminary round			First round	Second round	Quarter-finals	Semi-finals	Final
1968–69				(Luxembourg) Jeunesse Esch	(Denmark) AB	(Czechoslovakia) Spartak Trnava		
1971–72			(Italy) Internazionale					
1978–79			(Portugal) Porto	(England) Nottingham Forest				
1979–80			(Romania) Argeş Piteşti					
1989–90			(East Germany) Dynamo Dresden	(France) Marseille				
1992–93			(Cyprus) APOEL	(Netherlands) PSV Eindhoven				
1993–94			(France) Monaco					
Season	Qualifying round		Group stage			Quarter-finals	Semi-finals	Final
1994–95	(Scotland) Rangers		(Netherlands) Ajax (Italy) Milan (Austria) Casino Salzburg					
Season	Qualifying rounds		Group stage		Round of 16	Quarter-finals	Semi-finals	Final
2002–03		(Cyprus) APOEL	(Spain) Real Madrid (Italy) Roma (Belgium) Genk					
2003–04		(Switzerland) Grasshopper	(France) Monaco (Spain) Deportivo La Coruña (Netherlands) PSV Eindhoven					
2006–07		(Scotland) Hearts	(Italy) Milan (France) Lille (Belgium) Anderlecht					
2007–08		(Spain) Sevilla						
Season	Qualifying rounds	Play-off round	Group stage		Round of 16	Quarter-finals	Semi-finals	Final
2017–18	(Russia) CSKA Moscow							
2018–19	(Scotland) Celtic	(Hungary) MOL Vidi	(Germany) Bayern Munich (Netherlands) Ajax (Portugal) Benfica					
2023–24	(Croatia) Dinamo Zagreb	(Belgium) Antwerp						
Season	Qualifying rounds	Play-off round	League Phase	Knockout phase play-offs	Round of 16	Quarter-finals	Semi-finals	Final
2026–27		(Bulgaria) Levski Sofia	(Spain) Real Madrid (England) Manchester City (Germany) Borussia Dortmund (Italy) Roma (Ukraine) Shakhtar Donetsk (Turkey) Galatasaray (Austria) LASK (Italy) Como					

European Cup Winners' Cup / UEFA Cup Winners' Cup
Season	Qualifying round	First round	Second round	Quarter-finals	Semi-finals	Final
1964–65		(Socialist Federal Republic of Yugoslavia) Dinamo Zagreb				
1966–67		(Portugal) Braga				
1983–84		(Hungary) Újpest				
1995–96		(Switzerland) Sion	(Germany) Borussia M'gladbach			
1996–97		(Slovakia) Chemlon Humenné	(Slovenia) Olimpija Ljubljana	(France) PSG		
1997–98		(Latvia) Dinaburg	(Austria) Sturm Graz	(Russia) Lokomotiv Moscow		

Inter-Cities Fairs Cup / UEFA Cup / UEFA Europa League
Season	Qualifying round				First round	Second round	Third round	Quarter-finals	Semi-finals	Final
1970–71					(Netherlands) Twente					
1972–73					(Hungary) Salgótarján	(England) Liverpool				
1975–76					(Socialist Federal Republic of Yugoslavia) Vojvodina	(Czechoslovakia) Inter Bratislava				
1976–77					(Soviet Union) Dynamo Moscow	(England) Derby County	(Socialist Federal Republic of Yugoslavia) Red Star Belgrade	(England) Queens Park Rangers	(Italy) Juventus	
1977–78					(Romania) ASA Târgu Mureş	(Belgium) Standard Liège				
1982–83					(Germany) Köln					
1985–86					(Spain) Real Madrid					
1986–87					(Italy) Internazionale					
1988–89					(Spain) Athletic Bilbao					
1991–92					(Albania) Vllaznia Shkodër	(Soviet Union) Spartak Moscow	(Italy) Torino			
1998–99				(Hungary) Ferencváros	(Netherlands) Vitesse					
Season	Qualifying round			First round	Second round	Third round	Fourth round	Quarter-finals	Semi-finals	Final
1999–00				(Georgia (country)) Torpedo Kutaisi	(Hungary) MTK Budapest	(France) Monaco				
2000–01				(Hungary) Vasas	(Denmark) Herfølge Boldklub	(Germany) Bayer Leverkusen	(Spain) Barcelona			
2001–02	(Luxembourg) Grevenmacher			(Scotland) Hibernian	(Croatia) Osijek	(Bulgaria) Litex Lovech	(Italy) Internazionale			
2002–03						(Israel) Maccabi Haifa	(Spain) Málaga			
Season	First qualifying round		Second qualifying round	First round	Group stage	Round of 32	Round of 16	Quarter-finals	Semi-finals	Final
2004–05				(Slovenia) Gorica	(France) Lille (Spain) Sevilla (Germany) Alemannia Aachen (Russia) Zenit Saint Petersburg					
2005–06				(Russia) Zenit Saint Petersburg						
2006–07						(France) PSG				
2007–08				(Austria) Red Bull Salzburg	(Spain) Villarreal (Italy) Fiorentina (Czech Republic) Mladá Boleslav (Sweden) Elfsborg	(Spain) Getafe				
2008–09			(Cyprus) Omonia							
Season	First qualifying round	Second qualifying round	Third qualifying round	Play-off round	Group stage	Round of 32	Round of 16	Quarter-finals	Semi-finals	Final
2009–10				(Romania) Vaslui	(Portugal) Benfica (England) Everton (Belarus) BATE Borisov					
2010–11				(Scotland) Dundee United	(Russia) Zenit Saint Petersburg (Belgium) Anderlecht (Croatia) Hajduk Split					
2011–12				(Georgia (country)) Dinamo Tbilisi	(Belgium) Anderlecht (Russia) Lokomotiv Moscow (Austria) Sturm Graz					
2016–17			(France) Saint-Étienne							
2017–18				(Belgium) Club Brugge	(Italy) Milan (Croatia) Rijeka; Austria Wien	(Ukraine) Dynamo Kyiv				
2019–20			(Romania) Universitatea Craiova	(Turkey) Trabzonspor						
2020–21			(Switzerland) St. Gallen	(Germany) VfL Wolfsburg	(England) Leicester City (Portugal) Braga (Ukraine) Zorya Luhansk					
Season	First qualifying round	Second qualifying round	Third qualifying round	Play-off round	Group stage	Knockout round play-offs	Round of 16	Quarter-finals	Semi-finals	Final
2023–24					(England) Brighton & Hove Albion (France) Marseille (Netherlands) Ajax					

UEFA Conference League
Season	First qualifying round	Second qualifying round	Third qualifying round	Play-off round	Group stage	Knockout round play-offs	Round of 16	Quarter-finals	Semi-finals	Final
2021–22		(Bosnia and Herzegovina) Velež Mostar								
2024–25		(Andorra) Inter Club d'Escaldes	(Armenia) Noah							
Season	First qualifying round	Second qualifying round	Third qualifying round	Play-off round	League phase	Knockout round play-offs	Round of 16	Quarter-finals	Semi-finals	Final
2025–26		(Israel) Hapoel Be'er Sheva	(Cyprus) Aris Limassol	(Belgium) Anderlecht	(Italy) Fiorentina (Republic of Ireland) Shamrock Rovers (Slovenia) Celje (Scotland) Aberdeen (Turkey) Samsunspor (Romania) Universitatea Craiova	Bye	(Slovenia) Celje	(Spain) Rayo Vallecano		

Balkans Cup
Season	Group stage	Final
1960–61	(Romania) Steagul Roșu Brașov (Bulgaria) Levski Sofia (Albania) Partizani Tirana (Turkey) Fenerbahçe	
1966–67	(Bulgaria) Lokomotiv Sofia (Romania) Farul Constanța (Socialist Federal Republic of Yugoslavia) Vardar	(Turkey) Fenerbahçe
1967–68	(Bulgaria) Spartak Sofia (Socialist Federal Republic of Yugoslavia) Olimpija Ljubljana (Turkey) Fenerbahçe	
1980–81	(Socialist Federal Republic of Yugoslavia) Velež Mostar (Albania) Flamurtari	

== Match table ==
Season	Competition	Round	Opponent	Home	Away	Agg.	Qual.
1960–61	Balkans Cup	Group stage	(Romania) Brașov	2–4	3–0	5th	
1960–61	Balkans Cup	Group stage	(Turkey) Fenerbahçe	2–2	5–1	5th	
1960–61	Balkans Cup	Group stage	(Albania) Partizani	0–3	3–0	5th	
1960–61	Balkans Cup	Group stage	(Bulgaria) Levski Sofia	3–1	3–0	5th	
1963–64	European Cup	Preliminary round	(France) Monaco	1–1	7–2	3–8	
1964–65	European Cup Winners' Cup	First round	(Socialist Federal Republic of Yugoslavia) Dinamo Zagreb	2–0	3–0	2–3	
1966–67	European Cup Winners' Cup	First round	(Portugal) Braga	0–1	3–2	2–4	
1966–67	Balkans Cup	Group B	(Bulgaria) Lokomotiv Sofia	1–0	3–3	1st	
1966–67	Balkans Cup	Group B	(Romania) Farul Constanța	3–0	1–1	1st	
1966–67	Balkans Cup	Group B	(Socialist Federal Republic of Yugoslavia) Vardar	1–0	1–1	1st	
1966–67	Balkans Cup	Final	(Turkey) Fenerbahçe	2–1	1–0	3–5	
1967–68	Balkans Cup	Group B	(Bulgaria) Spartak Sofia	0–3	2–1	3rd	
1967–68	Balkans Cup	Group B	(Socialist Federal Republic of Yugoslavia) Olimpija Ljubljana	0–0	3–3	3rd	
1967–68	Balkans Cup	Group B	(Turkey) Fenerbahçe	3–1	3–0	3rd	
1968–69	European Cup	First round	(Luxembourg) Jeunesse Esch	3–0	3–2	5–3	
1968–69	European Cup	Second round	(Denmark) AB	0–0	0–2	2–0	
1968–69	European Cup	Quarter-finals	(Czechoslovakia) Spartak Trnava	1–1	2–1	2–3	
1970–71	Inter-Cities Fairs Cup	First round	(Netherlands) Twente	0–1	3–0	0–4	
1971–72	European Cup	First round	(Italy) Internazionale	3–2	4–1	4–6	
1972–73	UEFA Cup	First round	(Hungary) Salgótarján	3–1	1–1	4–2	
1972–73	UEFA Cup	Second round	(England) Liverpool	1–3	3–0	1–6	
1975–76	UEFA Cup	First round	(Socialist Federal Republic of Yugoslavia) Vojvodina	3–1	0–0	3–1	
1975–76	UEFA Cup	Second round	(Czechoslovakia) Inter Bratislava	3–1	2–0	3–3 (a)	
1976–77	UEFA Cup	First round	(Soviet Union) Dynamo Moscow	2–0	2–1	3–2 (a.e.t.)	
1976–77	UEFA Cup	Second round	(England) Derby County	2–0	2–3	5–2	
1976–77	UEFA Cup	Third round	(Socialist Federal Republic of Yugoslavia) Red Star Belgrade	2–0	3–1	3–3 (a)	
1976–77	UEFA Cup	Quarter-finals	(England) QPR	3–0	3–0	3–3 (7–6 p)	
1976–77	UEFA Cup	Semi-finals	(Italy) Juventus	0–1	4–1	1–5	
1977–78	UEFA Cup	First round	(Romania) ASA Târgu Mureş	3–0	1–0	3–1	
1977–78	UEFA Cup	Second round	(Belgium) Standard Liège	2–2	4–1	3–6	
1978–79	European Cup	First round	(Portugal) Porto	6–1	4–1	7–5	
1978–79	European Cup	Second round	(England) Nottingham Forest	1–2	5–1	2–7	
1979–80	European Cup	First round	(Romania) Argeş Piteşti	2–0	3–0	2–3	
1980–81	Balkans Cup	Group A	(Socialist Federal Republic of Yugoslavia) Velež Mostar	3–1	2–0	2nd	
1980–81	Balkans Cup	Group A	(Albania) Flamurtari	3–2	2–1	2nd	
1982–83	UEFA Cup	First round	(Germany) Köln	0–1	5–0	0–6	
1983–84	European Cup Winners' Cup	First round	(Hungary) Újpest	2–0	4–1	3–4	
1985–86	UEFA Cup	First round	(Spain) Real Madrid	1–0	5–0	1–5	
1986–87	UEFA Cup	First round	(Italy) Internazionale	0–1	2–0	0–3	
1988–89	UEFA Cup	First round	(Spain) Athletic Bilbao	1–0	2–0	1–2	
1989–90	European Cup	First round	(East Germany) Dynamo Dresden	5–3	1–0	5–4	
1989–90	European Cup	Second round	(France) Marseille	1–1	2–0	1–3	
1991–92	UEFA Cup	First round	(Albania) Vllaznia	2–0	0–1	3–0	
1991–92	UEFA Cup	Second round	(Soviet Union) Spartak Moscow	2–1	0–0	2–1	
1991–92	UEFA Cup	Third round	(Italy) Torino	2–2	1–0	2–3	
1992–93	UEFA Champions League	First round	(Cyprus) APOEL	1–1	2–2	3–3 (a)	
1992–93	UEFA Champions League	Second round	(Netherlands) PSV Eindhoven	1–0	3–0	1–3	
1993–94	UEFA Champions League	First round	(France) Monaco	1–1	1–0	1–2	
1994–95	UEFA Champions League	Qualifying round	(Scotland) Rangers	2–0	0–1	3–0	
1994–95	UEFA Champions League	Group D	(Austria) Casino Salzburg	1–3	0–0	4th	
1994–95	UEFA Champions League	Group D	(Netherlands) Ajax	1–2	2–0	4th	
1994–95	UEFA Champions League	Group D	(Italy) Milan	0–0	2–1	4th	
1995–96	UEFA Cup Winners' Cup	First round	(Switzerland) Sion	2–0	2–2	4–2	
1995–96	UEFA Cup Winners' Cup	Second round	(Germany) Borussia Mönchengladbach	0–1	4–1	1–5	
1996–97	UEFA Cup Winners' Cup	First round	(Slovakia) Humenné	1–0	1–2	3–1	
1996–97	UEFA Cup Winners' Cup	Second round	(Slovenia) Olimpija Ljubljana	4–0	0–2	6–0	
1996–97	UEFA Cup Winners' Cup	Quarter-finals	(France) Paris Saint-Germain	0–3	0–0	0–3	
1997–98	UEFA Cup Winners' Cup	First round	(Latvia) Dinaburg	5–0	2–4	9–2	
1997–98	UEFA Cup Winners' Cup	Second round	(Austria) Sturm Graz	2–0	1–0	2–1	
1997–98	UEFA Cup Winners' Cup	Quarter-finals	(Russia) Lokomotiv Moscow	0–0	2–1	1–2	
1998–99	UEFA Cup	Second qualifying round	(Hungary) Ferencváros	4–0	4–2	6–4	
1998–99	UEFA Cup	First round	(Netherlands) Vitesse	3–3	3–0	3–6	
1999–2000	UEFA Champions League	Third qualifying round	(Sweden) AIK	0–0	1–0	0–1	
1999–2000	UEFA Cup	First round	(Georgia (country)) Torpedo Kutaisi	6–1	0–1	7–1	
1999–2000	UEFA Cup	Second round	(Hungary) MTK	1–0	2–1	2–2 (a)	
1999–2000	UEFA Cup	Third round	(France) Monaco	2–2	1–0	2–3	
2000–01	UEFA Cup	First round	(Hungary) Vasas	2–0	2–2	4–2	
2000–01	UEFA Cup	Second round	(Denmark) Herfølge	5–0	2–1	6–2	
2000–01	UEFA Cup	Third round	(Germany) Bayer Leverkusen	2–0	4–4	6–4	
2000–01	UEFA Cup	Fourth round	(Spain) Barcelona	0–1	5–0	0–6	
2001–02	UEFA Cup	Qualifying round	(Luxembourg) Grevenmacher	6–0	0–2	8–0	
2001–02	UEFA Cup	First round	(Scotland) Hibernian	2–0	3–2	4–3 (a.e.t.)	
2001–02	UEFA Cup	Second round	(Croatia) Osijek	3–2	1–2	5–3	
2001–02	UEFA Cup	Third round	(Bulgaria) Litex Lovech	3–2	1–1	4–3	
2001–02	UEFA Cup	Fourth round	(Italy) Internazionale	2–2	3–1	3–5	
2002–03	UEFA Champions League	Third qualifying round	(Cyprus) APOEL	1–0	2–3	4–2	
2002–03	UEFA Champions League	Group C	(Belgium) Genk	1–1	0–0	3rd	
2002–03	UEFA Champions League	Group C	(Italy) Roma	0–0	1–1	3rd	
2002–03	UEFA Champions League	Group C	(Spain) Real Madrid	3–3	2–2	3rd	
2002–03	UEFA Cup	Third round	(Israel) Maccabi Haifa	4–0	1–4	8–1	
2002–03	UEFA Cup	Fourth round	(Spain) Málaga	0–1	0–0	0–1	
2003–04	UEFA Champions League	Third qualifying round	(Switzerland) Grasshopper	3–1	1–0	3–2	
2003–04	UEFA Champions League	Group C	(Spain) Deportivo La Coruña	1–1	3–0	4th	
2003–04	UEFA Champions League	Group C	(France) Monaco	0–0	4–0	4th	
2003–04	UEFA Champions League	Group C	(Netherlands) PSV Eindhoven	0–1	2–0	4th	
2004–05	UEFA Cup	First round	(Slovenia) Gorica	1–0	1–1	2–1	
2004–05	UEFA Cup	Group H	(Russia) Zenit Saint Petersburg	—	5–1	5th	
2004–05	UEFA Cup	Group H	(France) Lille	1–2	—	5th	
2004–05	UEFA Cup	Group H	(Spain) Sevilla	—	3–2	5th	
2004–05	UEFA Cup	Group H	(Germany) Alemannia Aachen	0–2	—	5th	
2005–06	UEFA Cup	First round	(Russia) Zenit Saint Petersburg	0–1	0–0	0–1	
2006–07	UEFA Champions League	Third qualifying round	(Scotland) Hearts	3–0	1–2	5–1	
2006–07	UEFA Champions League	Group H	(Italy) Milan	1–0	3–0	3rd	
2006–07	UEFA Champions League	Group H	(Belgium) Anderlecht	1–1	2–2	3rd	
2006–07	UEFA Champions League	Group H	(France) Lille	1–0	3–1	3rd	
2006–07	UEFA Cup	Round of 32	(France) Paris Saint-Germain	0–2	2–0	0–4	
2007–08	UEFA Champions League	Third qualifying round	(Spain) Sevilla	1–4	2–0	1–6	
2007–08	UEFA Cup	First round	(Austria) Red Bull Salzburg	3–0	1–0	3–1	
2007–08	UEFA Cup	Group C	(Sweden) IF Elfsborg	—	1–1	3rd	
2007–08	UEFA Cup	Group C	(Italy) Fiorentina	1–1	—	3rd	
2007–08	UEFA Cup	Group C	(Czech Republic) Mladá Boleslav	—	0–1	3rd	
2007–08	UEFA Cup	Group C	(Spain) Villarreal	1–2	—	3rd	
2007–08	UEFA Cup	Round of 32	(Spain) Getafe	1–1	3–0	1–4	
2008–09	UEFA Cup	Second qualifying round	(Cyprus) Omonia	0–1	2–2	2–3	
2009–10	UEFA Europa League	Play-off round	(Romania) Vaslui	3–0	2–1	4–2	
2009–10	UEFA Europa League	Group I	(England) Everton	0–1	4–0	4th	
2009–10	UEFA Europa League	Group I	(Portugal) Benfica	1–0	2–1	4th	
2009–10	UEFA Europa League	Group I	(Belarus) BATE Borisov	2–2	2–1	4th	
2010–11	UEFA Europa League	Play-off round	(Scotland) Dundee United	1–1	0–1	2–1	
2010–11	UEFA Europa League	Group G	(Russia) Zenit Saint Petersburg	0–3	4–2	3rd	
2010–11	UEFA Europa League	Group G	(Belgium) Anderlecht	1–1	3–0	3rd	
2010–11	UEFA Europa League	Group G	(Croatia) Hajduk Split	3–1	1–3	3rd	
2011–12	UEFA Europa League	Play-off round	(Georgia (country)) Dinamo Tbilisi	1–0	1–1	2–1 (a.e.t.)	
2011–12	UEFA Europa League	Group L	(Belgium) Anderlecht	1–2	4–1	3rd	
2011–12	UEFA Europa League	Group L	(Austria) Sturm Graz	1–2	1–3	3rd	
2011–12	UEFA Europa League	Group L	(Russia) Lokomotiv Moscow	1–3	3–1	3rd	
2016–17	UEFA Europa League	Third qualifying round	(France) Saint-Étienne	0–1	0–0	0–1	
2017–18	UEFA Champions League	Third qualifying round	(Russia) CSKA Moscow	0–2	1–0	0–3	
2017–18	UEFA Europa League	Play-off round	(Belgium) Club Brugge	3–0	0–0	3–0	
2017–18	UEFA Europa League	Group D	(Italy) Milan	0–0	0–0	2nd	
2017–18	UEFA Europa League	Group D	Austria Wien	2–2	0–0	2nd	
2017–18	UEFA Europa League	Group D	(Croatia) Rijeka	2–2	1–2	2nd	
2017–18	UEFA Europa League	Round of 32	(Ukraine) Dynamo Kyiv	1–1	0–0	1–1 (a)	
2018–19	UEFA Champions League	Third qualifying round	(Scotland) Celtic	2–1	1–1	3–2	
2018–19	UEFA Champions League	Play-off round	(Hungary) MOL Vidi	1–1	1–2	3–2	
2018–19	UEFA Champions League	Group E	(Germany) Bayern Munich	0–2	2–0	4th	
2018–19	UEFA Champions League	Group E	(Portugal) Benfica	2–3	1–0	4th	
2018–19	UEFA Champions League	Group E	(Netherlands) Ajax	0–2	3–0	4th	
2019–20	UEFA Europa League	Third qualifying round	(Romania) Universitatea Craiova	1–1	0–2	3–1	
2019–20	UEFA Europa League	Play-off round	(Turkey) Trabzonspor	1–3	0–2	3–3 (a)	
2020–21	UEFA Europa League	Third qualifying round	(Switzerland) St. Gallen	—	0–1	0–1	
2020–21	UEFA Europa League	Play-off round	(Germany) VfL Wolfsburg	2–1	—	2–1	
2020–21	UEFA Europa League	Group G	(England) Leicester City	1–2	2–0	4th	
2020–21	UEFA Europa League	Group G	(Portugal) Braga	2–4	3–0	4th	
2020–21	UEFA Europa League	Group G	(Ukraine) Zorya Luhansk	0–3	1–4	4th	
2021–22	UEFA Europa Conference League	Second qualifying round	(Bosnia and Herzegovina) Velež Mostar	1–0	2–1	2–2 (2–3 p)	
2023–24	UEFA Champions League	Third qualifying round	(Croatia) Dinamo Zagreb	2–2	1–2	4–3	
2023–24	UEFA Champions League	Play-off round	(Belgium) Antwerp	1–2	1–0	1–3	
2023–24	UEFA Europa League	Group B	(France) Marseille	0–2	3–1	4th	
2023–24	UEFA Europa League	Group B	(Netherlands) Ajax	1–1	3–1	4th	
2023–24	UEFA Europa League	Group B	(England) Brighton & Hove Albion	0–1	2–3	4th	
2024–25	UEFA Conference League	Second qualifying round	(Andorra) Inter Club d'Escaldes	4–3	0−4	8−3	
2024–25	UEFA Conference League	Third qualifying round	(Armenia) Noah	1−0	3−1	2−3	
2025–26	UEFA Conference League	Second qualifying round	(Israel) Hapoel Be'er Sheva	1–0	0–0	1−0	
2025–26	UEFA Conference League	Third qualifying round	(Cyprus) Aris Limassol	3–1	2–2	5−3 (a.e.t.)	
2025–26	UEFA Conference League	Play-off round	(Belgium) Anderlecht	2–0	1–1	3−1	
2025–26	UEFA Conference League	League phase	(Italy) Fiorentina	—	0–1	3rd	
2025–26	UEFA Conference League	League phase	(Republic of Ireland) Shamrock Rovers	1–1	—	3rd	
2025–26	UEFA Conference League	League phase	(Slovenia) Celje	—	3–1	3rd	
2025–26	UEFA Conference League	League phase	(Scotland) Aberdeen	6–0	—	3rd	
2025–26	UEFA Conference League	League phase	(Turkey) Samsunspor	—	1–2	3rd	
2025–26	UEFA Conference League	League phase	(Romania) Universitatea Craiova	3–2	—	3rd	
2025–26	UEFA Conference League	Round of 16	(Slovenia) Celje	0–2	0–4	4−2	
2025–26	UEFA Conference League	Quarter-finals	(Spain) Rayo Vallecano	3–1	3–0	3−4	
2026–27	UEFA Champions League	Play-off round	(Bulgaria) Levski Sofia	4–0	0–0	4–0	
2026–27	UEFA Champions League	League phase	(Austria) LASK	1–0	—		
2026–27	UEFA Champions League	League phase	(Ukraine) Shakhtar Donetsk	—	3–1		
2026–27	UEFA Champions League	League phase	(England) Manchester City	—	5–1		
2026–27	UEFA Champions League	League phase	(Spain) Real Madrid	2–3	—		
2026–27	UEFA Champions League	League phase	(Italy) Como	—	24 Nov		
2026–27	UEFA Champions League	League phase	(Turkey) Galatasaray	8 Dec	—		
2026–27	UEFA Champions League	League phase	(Italy) Roma	19 Jan	—		
2026–27	UEFA Champions League	League phase	(Germany) Borussia Dortmund	—	27 Jan		

Last updated: 4 November 2026
Source: aekfc.gr

== Record by country of opposition ==
Country	Home							Away							Total							
Country	Pld	W	D	L	GF	GA	GD	Pld	W	D	L	GF	GA	GD	Pld	W	D	L	GF	GA	GD	Win%
Albania	3	2	0	1	5	5	0	3	1	0	2	2	5	−3	6	3	0	3	7	10	−3	50.00
Andorra	1	1	0	0	4	3	+1	1	1	0	0	4	0	+4	2	2	0	0	8	3	+5	100.00
Armenia	1	1	0	0	1	0	+1	1	0	0	1	1	3	−2	2	1	0	1	2	3	−1	50.00
Austria	6	3	1	2	10	7	+3	5	1	2	2	3	3	0	11	4	3	4	13	10	+3	36.36
Belgium	8	2	4	2	12	9	+3	8	0	4	4	5	15	−10	16	2	8	6	17	24	−7	12.50
Belarus	1	0	1	0	2	2	0	1	0	0	1	1	2	−1	2	0	1	1	3	4	−1	0.00
Bosnia & Herzegovina	2	2	0	0	4	1	+3	2	0	0	2	1	4	−3	4	2	0	2	5	5	0	50.00
Bulgaria	5	4	0	1	11	6	+5	5	0	3	2	5	9	−4	10	4	3	3	16	15	+1	40.00
Croatia	5	3	2	0	11	6	+5	5	4	0	1	10	8	+2	10	7	2	1	21	14	+7	70.00
Cyprus	4	2	1	1	5	3	+2	4	1	3	0	9	8	+1	8	3	4	1	14	11	+3	37.50
Czech Republic	0	0	0	0	0	0	0	1	1	0	0	1	0	+1	1	1	0	0	1	0	+1	100.00
Denmark	2	1	1	0	5	0	+5	2	1	0	1	3	2	+1	4	2	1	1	8	2	+6	50.00
England	7	2	0	5	8	9	−1	8	2	0	6	8	26	−18	15	4	0	11	16	35	−19	26.67
France	11	1	5	5	7	15	−8	10	0	2	8	4	23	−19	21	1	7	13	11	38	−27	4.76
Georgia	2	2	0	0	7	1	+6	2	1	1	0	2	1	+1	4	3	1	0	9	2	+8	75.00
Germany	7	3	0	4	9	10	−1	5	0	1	4	5	16	−11	12	3	1	8	14	26	−12	25.00
Hungary	6	5	1	0	13	2	+11	6	1	2	3	9	14	−5	12	6	3	3	22	16	+6	50.00
Ireland	1	0	1	0	1	1	0	0	0	0	0	0	0	0	1	0	1	0	1	1	0	0.00
Israel	2	2	0	0	5	0	+5	2	1	1	0	4	1	+3	4	3	1	0	9	1	+8	75.00
Italy	10	2	6	2	9	9	0	10	1	2	7	6	20	−14	20	3	8	9	15	29	−14	15.00
Latvia	1	1	0	0	5	0	+5	1	1	0	0	4	2	+2	2	2	0	0	9	2	+7	100.00
Luxembourg	2	2	0	0	9	0	+9	2	1	0	1	4	3	+1	4	3	0	1	13	3	+10	75.00
North Macedonia	1	1	0	0	1	0	+1	1	0	1	0	1	1	0	2	1	1	0	2	1	+1	50.00
Netherlands	7	1	2	4	6	10	−4	7	0	0	7	1	19	−18	14	1	2	11	7	29	−22	7.14
Portugal	5	2	0	3	11	9	+2	5	0	0	5	4	13	−9	10	2	0	8	15	22	−7	20.00
Romania	7	5	1	1	17	7	+10	6	1	1	4	4	10	−6	13	6	2	5	21	17	+4	46.15
Russia	7	2	1	4	5	10	−5	8	0	2	6	6	17	−11	15	2	3	10	11	27	−16	13.33
Scotland	6	5	1	0	16	2	+14	5	3	1	1	7	5	+2	11	8	2	1	23	7	+16	72.73
Serbia	2	2	0	0	5	1	+4	2	0	1	1	1	3	−2	4	2	1	1	6	4	+2	50.00
Slovakia	3	2	1	0	5	2	+3	3	1	0	2	3	5	−2	6	3	1	2	8	7	+1	50.00
Slovenia	4	2	1	1	5	2	+3	5	2	2	1	11	7	+4	9	4	3	2	16	9	+7	44.44
Spain	11	3	3	5	14	17	−3	10	0	2	8	4	28	−24	21	3	5	13	18	45	−27	14.29
Sweden	1	0	1	0	0	0	0	2	0	1	1	1	2	−1	3	0	2	1	1	2	−1	0.00
Switzerland	2	2	0	0	5	1	+4	3	1	1	1	3	3	0	5	3	1	1	8	4	+4	60.00
Turkey	4	2	1	1	8	7	+1	6	2	0	4	6	13	−7	10	4	1	5	14	20	−6	40.00
Ukraine	2	0	1	1	1	4	−3	3	1	1	1	5	4	+1	5	1	2	2	6	8	-2	20.00
Europe	149	70	36	43	242	161	+81	150	29	34	87	148	295	−147	299	99	70	130	390	456	−66	33.11

Last updated: 4 November 2026
Source: aekfc.gr

- 1970–71 Inter-Cities Fairs Cup matches against Twente are included.
- 1960–61, 1966–67, 1967–68, and 1980–81 Balkans Cup matches are included.
- Last entry is the match against Real Madrid for the 2026–27 Champions League league phase.
- The record after the last entry is 299 matches in total (99W, 70D, 130L, GF390, GA456), with 149 home matches (70W, 36D, 43L, GF242, GA161) and 150 away matches (29W, 34D, 87L, GF148, GA295).

=== UEFA ranking ===
Rank	Team	Country	Points
64	Red Star Belgrade	Serbia	31.500
65	Bologna	Italy	30.750
66	AEK Athens	Greece	30.500
67	Newcastle United	England	29.750
68	Panathinaikos	Greece	29.250

Last update: 11 September 2026

Source: UEFA.com

== Players ==
=== Most appearances ===
#	Name	Apps				
#	Name	Total	UCL	CWC	UEL	UECL
1	(Greece) Michalis Kasapis	67	23	16	28	0
2	(Greece) Petros Mantalos	60	17	0	24	19
3	(Greece) Ilias Atmatsidis	51	12	16	23	0
3	(Greece) Demis Nikolaidis	51	10	11	30	0
5	(Greece) Vasilios Lakis	50	19	0	31	0
5	(Greece) Nikos Kostenoglou	50	13	13	24	0
7	(Greece) Vasilios Tsiartas	49	26	4	19	0
8	(North Macedonia) Toni Savevski	48	18	16	14	0
8	(Greece) Christos Maladenis	48	11	14	23	0
10	(Greece) Nikos Liberopoulos	40	16	0	24	0
11	(Greece) Stelios Manolas	38	14	13	11	0
12	(Greece) Akis Zikos	37	8	0	29	0
13	(Greece) Theodoros Zagorakis	36	15	0	21	0
14	(Greece) Nikolaos Georgeas	35	13	0	22	0
14	(Greece) Charis Kopitsis	35	10	15	10	0
14	(Greece) Mimis Papaioannou	35	9	5	21	0
17	(Greece) Konstantinos Galanopoulos	32	12	0	19	1
17	(Cameroon) Harold Moukoudi	32	10	0	5	17
19	(Greece) Lazaros Rota	31	8	0	3	20
20	(Portugal) André Simões	30	10	0	20	0
20	(Serbia) Mijat Gaćinović	30	9	0	4	17
20	(Greece) Lakis Nikolaou	30	8	0	22	0
23	(Greece) Traianos Dellas	29	7	0	22	0
23	(Greece) Sotiris Konstantinidis	29	6	0	23	0
23	(Greece) Pantelis Kafes	29	1	0	28	0
26	(Greece) Michalis Bakakis	28	12	0	14	2
27	(Bulgaria) Milen Petkov	27	5	0	22	0
27	(Mexico) Orbelín Pineda	27	4	0	5	18
29	(Greece) Kostas Katsouranis	26	16	0	10	0
29	(Greece) Michalis Kapsis	26	14	0	12	0
29	(Croatia) Marko Livaja	26	7	0	19	0
29	(Mauritania) Aboubakary Koïta	26	6	0	0	20
33	(Greece) Thomas Mavros	25	6	2	17	0
34	(Greece) Vasilios Borbokis	24	12	10	2	0
34	(Greece) Petros Ravousis	24	6	1	17	0
34	(Greece) Stefanos Theodoridis	24	2	0	22	0
34	(Argentina) Ismael Blanco	24	0	0	24	0
38	(Greece) Dionysis Chiotis	23	13	0	10	0
39	(Belgium) Viktor Klonaridis	22	11	0	11	0
39	(Greece) Michalis Vlachos	22	10	12	0	0
39	(Greece) Vaios Karagiannis	22	10	3	9	0
39	(Albania) Stavros Pilios	22	6	0	0	16
39	(Portugal) Filipe Relvas	22	6	0	0	16
39	(Cyprus) Tasos Konstantinou	22	5	0	17	0
39	(Brazil) Gustavo Manduca	22	5	0	17	0
39	(Albania) Thomas Strakosha	22	2	0	0	20
47	(Greece) Pavlos Papaioannou	21	8	2	11	0
47	(Greece) Takis Nikoloudis	21	6	0	15	0
47	(Romania) Răzvan Marin	21	6	0	0	15
47	(Sweden) Niclas Eliasson	21	4	0	6	11
47	(Brazil) Leonardo	21	0	0	21	0
52	(Bosnia and Herzegovina) Refik Šabanadžović	20	11	3	6	0
52	(Ukraine) Dmytro Chyhrynskyi	20	7	0	13	0
52	(Greece) Lakis Stergioudas	20	4	0	16	0
52	(Greece) Panagiotis Lagos	20	4	0	16	0
56	(Brazil) Júlio César	19	10	0	9	0
56	(Greece) Daniel Batista	19	3	11	5	0
58	(Hungary) Dániel Tőzsér	18	10	0	8	0
58	(Greece) Christos Kostis	18	8	10	0	0
58	(Brazil) Rodrigo Galo	18	8	0	10	0
58	(Portugal) Hélder Lopes	18	4	0	12	2
58	(Argentina) Sergio Araujo	18	4	0	12	2
58	(Croatia) Domagoj Vida	18	4	0	5	9
58	(Greece) Dionysis Tsamis	18	1	0	17	0
58	(Greece) Grigoris Makos	18	0	0	18	0
66	(Serbia) Luka Jović	17	6	0	0	11
67	(Argentina) Ezequiel Ponce	16	11	0	5	0
67	(Greece) Vasilios Barkas	16	10	0	6	0
67	(Greece) Georgios Koutoulas	16	8	1	7	0
67	(Greece) Babis Intzoglou	16	6	0	10	0
67	(Poland) Damian Szymański	16	4	0	6	6
67	(Canada) Tam Nsaliwa	16	2	0	10	0
67	(Bosnia and Herzegovina) Ognjen Vranješ	16	2	0	13	1
67	(Argentina) Sebastián Saja	16	0	0	16	0
75	(Greece) Vasilis Dimitriadis	15	8	2	5	0
75	(Angola) Zini	15	6	0	0	9
75	(Georgia (country)) Temur Ketsbaia	15	5	10	0	0
75	(Greece) Anastasios Bakasetas	15	5	10	0	0
75	(Trinidad and Tobago) Levi García	15	3	0	7	5
75	(Brazil) Ferrugem	15	0	0	15	0
75	(Argentina) Ignacio Scocco	15	0	0	15	0
82	(Serbia) Ilija Ivić	14	10	0	4	0
82	(Greece) Vangelis Moras	14	9	0	5	0
82	(Greece) Stelios Skevofilakas	14	8	4	2	0
82	(Greece) Christos Vasilopoulos	14	7	0	7	0
82	(Greece) Spyros Pomonis	14	5	3	6	0
82	(Iran) Ehsan Hajsafi	14	4	0	6	4
82	(Germany) Walter Wagner	14	0	0	14	0
82	(Greece) Savvas Gentsoglou	14	0	0	14	0
90	(Greece) Christos Ardizoglou	13	6	2	5	0
90	(Greece) Kostas Nikolaidis	13	6	1	6	0
90	(Morocco) Nordin Amrabat	13	4	0	6	3
90	(Greece) Apostolos Toskas	13	2	0	11	0
90	(Greece) Kostas Manolas	13	0	0	13	0
90	(Switzerland) Dereck Kutesa	13	0	0	0	13
96	(Greece) Georgios Agorogiannis	12	12	0	0	0
96	(Costa Rica) Mauricio Wright	12	8	0	4	0
96	(Italy) Bruno Cirillo	12	8	0	4	0
96	(Serbia) Uroš Ćosić	12	7	0	5	0
96	(Greece) Stavros Stamatis	12	6	0	6	0
96	(Greece) Alexis Alexandris	12	6	0	6	0
96	(Greece) Sokratis Papastathopoulos	12	4	0	8	0
96	(Denmark) Jens Jønsson	12	4	0	4	4
96	(Greece) Lazaros Papadopoulos	12	2	0	10	0
96	(Portugal) Geraldo Alves	12	2	0	10	0
96	(Greece) Lazaros Christodoulopoulos	12	2	0	10	0
96	(Iceland) Arnar Grétarsson	12	0	6	6	0
96	(Greece) Nikolaos Karabelas	12	0	0	12	0
96	(Greece) Stratos Svarnas	12	0	0	10	2
96	(Argentina) Roberto Pereyra	12	0	0	0	12
111	(Sweden) Niklas Hult	11	10	0	1	0
111	(Greece) Dimitris Saravakos	11	8	3	0	0
111	(Greece) Grigoris Georgatos	11	8	0	3	0
111	(Italy) Stefano Sorrentino	11	7	0	4	0
111	(Australia) Jim Patikas	11	5	0	6	0
111	(Greece) Dimitris Markos	11	2	0	9	0
111	(Greece) Giannis Anestis	11	2	0	9	0
111	(Greece) Takis Karagiozopoulos	11	1	2	8	0
111	(Greece) Giannis Kalitzakis	11	0	5	6	0
111	(Bosnia and Herzegovina) Sanel Jahić	11	0	0	11	0
111	(Serbia) Nenad Krstičić	11	0	0	11	0
111	(Croatia) Robert Ljubičić	11	0	0	0	11
123	(Greece) Giorgos Karafeskos	10	8	2	0	0
123	(Greece) Dimitris Nalitzis	10	7	0	3	0
123	(Greece) Vasilios Lampropoulos	10	7	0	3	0
123	(Greece) Giorgos Kefalidis	10	6	2	2	0
123	(Greece) Antonis Minou	10	4	0	6	0
123	(Switzerland) Steven Zuber	10	4	0	5	1
123	(Greece) Stavros Tziortziopoulos	10	3	0	7	0
123	(Brazil) Edson Ratinho	10	2	0	8	0
123	(Portugal) Nélson Oliveira	10	0	0	10	0
123	(Iran) Karim Ansarifard	10	0	0	8	2

Last updated: 2026-11-04
Source: football.aek.com

=== Top scorers ===
#	Name	Goals				
#	Name	Total	UCL	CWC	UEL	UECL
1	(Greece) Demis Nikolaidis	26	2	3	21	0
2	(Greece) Mimis Papaioannou	11	4	2	5	0
3	(Greece) Vasilios Tsiartas	10	2	0	8	0
4	(Greece) Vasilios Lakis	8	2	0	6	0
4	(Croatia) Marko Livaja	8	1	0	7	0
4	(Greece) Daniel Batista	8	0	5	3	0
4	(Argentina) Ismael Blanco	8	0	0	8	0
8	(Greece) Nikos Liberopoulos	7	4	0	3	0
8	(Greece) Petros Mantalos	7	1	0	5	1
10	(North Macedonia) Toni Savevski	6	5	1	0	0
10	(Cyprus) Tasos Konstantinou	6	2	0	4	0
10	(Greece) Thomas Mavros	6	2	0	4	0
10	(Romania) Răzvan Marin	6	2	0	0	4
10	(Mauritania) Aboubakary Koïta	6	1	0	0	5
10	(Greece) Charis Kopitsis	6	0	3	3	0
10	(Trinidad and Tobago) Levi García	6	0	0	1	5
17	(Belgium) Viktor Klonaridis	5	4	0	1	0
17	(Greece) Christos Maladenis	5	1	2	2	0
17	(Serbia) Luka Jović	5	1	0	0	4
17	(Greece) Sotiris Konstantinidis	5	0	0	5	0
17	(West Germany) Walter Wagner	5	0	0	5	0
17	(Greece) Theodoros Zagorakis	5	0	0	5	0
17	(Switzerland) Dereck Kutesa	5	0	0	0	5
24	(Brazil) Júlio César	4	4	0	0	0
24	(Greece) Vasilis Dimitriadis	4	2	0	2	0
24	(Greece) Kostas Katsouranis	4	2	0	2	0
24	(Argentina) Ignacio Scocco	4	0	0	4	0
24	(Serbia) Mijat Gaćinović	4	0	0	1	3
29	(Greece) Panagiotis Ventouris	3	3	0	0	0
29	(Bosnia and Herzegovina) Dušan Bajević	3	3	0	0	0
29	(Greece) Vasilios Borbokis	3	2	1	0	0
29	(Argentina) Sergio Araujo	3	2	0	1	0
29	(Hungary) Barnabás Varga	3	2	0	0	1
29	(Greece) Michalis Vlachos	3	1	2	0	0
29	(Greece) Kostas Nikolaidis	3	1	0	2	0
29	(Greece) Lakis Nikolaou	3	1	0	2	0
29	(Brazil) Rivaldo	3	1	0	2	0
29	(Croatia) Domagoj Vida	3	1	0	1	1
29	(Greece) Christos Kostis	3	0	3	0	0
29	(Greece) Takis Nikoloudis	3	0	0	3	0
29	(Serbia) Dragan Ćirić	3	0	0	3	0
29	(Argentina) Fernando Navas	3	0	0	3	0
29	(Brazil) Leonardo	3	0	0	3	0
29	(Greece) Lazaros Christodoulopoulos	3	0	0	3	0
29	(Portugal) André Simões	3	0	0	3	0
46	(Greece) Alexis Alexandris	2	2	0	0	0
46	(Cyprus) Giorgos Savvidis	2	2	0	0	0
46	(Greece) Dimitris Saravakos	2	2	0	0	0
46	(Costa Rica) Walter Centeno	2	2	0	0	0
46	(Albania) Stavros Pilios	2	2	0	0	0
46	(Greece) Kostas Nestoridis	2	1	1	0	0
46	(Greece) Christos Ardizoglou	2	1	0	1	0
46	(Bosnia and Herzegovina) Refik Šabanadžović	2	1	0	1	0
46	(Georgia (country)) Temur Ketsbaia	2	0	2	0	0
46	(Brazil) Veridiano Marcelo	2	0	2	0	0
46	(Greece) Lazaros Papadopoulos	2	0	0	2	0
46	(Greece) Pavlos Papaioannou	2	0	0	2	0
46	(Greece) Akis Zikos	2	0	0	2	0
46	(Bulgaria) Milen Petkov	2	0	0	2	0
46	(Brazil) Gustavo Manduca	2	0	0	2	0
46	(Algeria) Rafik Djebbour	2	0	0	2	0
46	(Greece) Kostas Manolas	2	0	0	2	0
46	(Greece) Dimitrios Sialmas	2	0	0	2	0
46	(Portugal) Nélson Oliveira	2	0	0	2	0
46	(Sweden) Muamer Tanković	2	0	0	2	0
46	(Iran) Karim Ansarifard	2	0	0	1	1
46	(Switzerland) Steven Zuber	2	1	0	0	1
46	(Portugal) Filipe Relvas	2	0	0	0	2
46	(Sweden) Niclas Eliasson	2	0	0	0	2
46	(Cameroon) Harold Moukoudi	2	0	0	0	2
46	(Angola) Zini	2	0	0	0	2
72	(Greece) Andreas Stamatiadis	1	1	0	0	0
72	(Greece) Fanis Tasinos	1	1	0	0	0
72	(Greece) Emilios Theofanidis	1	1	0	0	0
72	(Greece) Kostas Papageorgiou	1	1	0	0	0
72	(Greece) Spyros Pomonis	1	1	0	0	0
72	(Greece) Giorgos Karafeskos	1	1	0	0	0
72	(Greece) Nikos Sevastopoulos	1	1	0	0	0
72	(Greece) Stelios Manolas	1	1	0	0	0
72	(Bosnia and Herzegovina) Franjo Vladić	1	1	0	0	0
72	(Poland) Mirosław Okoński	1	1	0	0	0
72	(Croatia) Zoran Slišković	1	1	0	0	0
72	(Italy) Bruno Cirillo	1	1	0	0	0
72	(Serbia) Vladan Ivić	1	1	0	0	0
72	(Greece) Pantelis Kapetanos	1	1	0	0	0
72	(Costa Rica) Mauricio Wright	1	1	0	0	0
72	(Brazil) Rodrigo Galo	1	1	0	0	0
72	(Greece) Anastasios Bakasetas	1	1	0	0	0
72	(Greece) Konstantinos Galanopoulos	1	1	0	0	0
72	(Croatia) Lovro Majer	1	1	0	0	0
72	(Greece) Manolis Kottis	1	0	1	0	0
72	(Greece) Vangelis Vlachos	1	0	1	0	0
72	(Scotland) Trevor Ross	1	0	1	0	0
72	(Greece) Ioannis Kalitzakis	1	0	1	0	0
72	(Greece) Evripidis Katsavos	1	0	1	0	0
72	(Argentina) Rodolfo Vicente	1	0	0	1	0
72	(Uruguay) Milton Viera	1	0	0	1	0
72	(Greece) Giannis Mousouris	1	0	0	1	0
72	(Greece) Dimitris Pittas	1	0	0	1	0
72	(Greece) Georgios Donis	1	0	0	1	0
72	(Liberia) Kelvin Sebwe	1	0	0	1	0
72	(Paraguay) Carlos Gamarra	1	0	0	1	0
72	(Greece) Grigoris Georgatos	1	0	0	1	0
72	(Greece) Dimitris Nalitzis	1	0	0	1	0
72	(Ghana) Koffi Amponsah	1	0	0	1	0
72	(Serbia) Nenad Bjeković	1	0	0	1	0
72	(Cyprus) Simos Krassas	1	0	0	1	0
72	(Greece) Stavros Tziortziopoulos	1	0	0	1	0
72	(Brazil) Alessandro Soares	1	0	0	1	0
72	(Greece) Panagiotis Kone	1	0	0	1	0
72	(Canada) Tam Nsaliwa	1	0	0	1	0
72	(Greece) Charilaos Pappas	1	0	0	1	0
72	(Greece) Michalis Pavlis	1	0	0	1	0
72	(Australia) Nathan Burns	1	0	0	1	0
72	(Portugal) Geraldo Alves	1	0	0	1	0
72	(Greece) Pantelis Kafes	1	0	0	1	0
72	(Sweden) Daniel Majstorović	1	0	0	1	0
72	(Senegal) Papa Bouba Diop	1	0	0	1	0
72	(Spain) José Carlos	1	0	0	1	0
72	(Albania) Astrit Ajdarević	1	0	0	1	0
72	(Greece) Stavros Vasilantonopoulos	1	0	0	1	0
72	(France) Djibril Sidibé	1	0	0	1	0
72	(Argentina) Ezequiel Ponce	1	0	0	1	0
72	(Mexico) Orbelín Pineda	1	0	0	1	0
72	(Croatia) Robert Ljubičić	1	0	0	0	1
72	(Morocco) Nordin Amrabat	1	0	0	0	1
72	(Argentina) Roberto Pereyra	1	0	0	0	1
Own goals		9	4	1	4	0
Total		358	96	33	187	42

Last updated: 2026-11-04
Source: football.aek.com

== Notable matches ==
=== Notable wins ===
Season	Match	Score
European Cup / UEFA Champions League
1971–72	AEK Athens – (Italy) Internazionale (Note: Internazionale were the eventual runners-up.)	3–2
1978–79	AEK Athens – (Portugal) Porto	6–1
1989–90	AEK Athens – (East Germany) Dynamo Dresden	5–3
1992–93	AEK Athens – (Netherlands) PSV Eindhoven	1–0
1994–95	AEK Athens – (Scotland) Rangers	2–0
1994–95	(Scotland) Rangers – AEK Athens	0–1
2006–07	AEK Athens – (Italy) Milan (Note: Milan were the eventual winners.)	1–0
2006–07	AEK Athens – (France) Lille	1–0
2018–19	AEK Athens – (Scotland) Celtic	2–1
2023–24	(Croatia) Dinamo Zagreb – AEK Athens	1–2
UEFA Cup Winners' Cup
1964–65	AEK Athens – (Socialist Federal Republic of Yugoslavia) Dinamo Zagreb	2–0
UEFA Cup / UEFA Europa League
1976–77	AEK Athens – (Soviet Union) Dynamo Moscow	2–0
1976–77	(England) Derby County - AEK Athens	2–3
1976–77	AEK Athens – (England) Derby County	2–0
1976–77	AEK Athens – (Socialist Federal Republic of Yugoslavia) Red Star Belgrade	2–0
1976–77	AEK Athens – (England) QPR	3–0
1985–86	AEK Athens – (Spain) Real Madrid (Note: Real Madrid were the defending champions and the eventual winners.)	1–0
1988–89	AEK Athens – (Spain) Athletic Bilbao	1–0
1991–92	AEK Athens – (Soviet Union) Spartak Moscow	2–1
2000–01	AEK Athens – (Germany) Bayer Leverkusen	2–0
2009–10	AEK Athens – (Portugal) Benfica	1–0
2020–21	AEK Athens – (Germany) VfL Wolfsburg	2–1
2023–24	(England) Brighton & Hove Albion - AEK Athens	2–3
UEFA Conference League
2025–26	AEK Athens – (Belgium) Anderlecht	2–0
2025–26	AEK Athens – (Scotland) Aberdeen	6–0
2025–26	(Italy) Fiorentina – AEK Athens	0–1
2025–26	AEK Athens - (Spain) Rayo Vallecano	3–1

=== Biggest wins ===
Season	Match	Score
European Cup / UEFA Champions League
1968–69	AEK Athens – (Luxembourg) Jeunesse Esch	3–0
1978–79	AEK Athens – (Portugal) Porto	6–1
2006–07	AEK Athens – (Scotland) Hearts	3–0
2026–27	AEK Athens – (Bulgaria) Levski Sofia	4–0
UEFA Cup Winners' Cup
1996–97	AEK Athens – (Slovenia) Olimpija Ljubljana	4–0
1997–98	AEK Athens – (Latvia) Dinaburg	5–0
UEFA Cup / UEFA Europa League
1976–77	AEK Athens – (England) QPR	3–0
1977–78	AEK Athens – (Romania) ASA Târgu Mureș	3–0
1998–99	AEK Athens – (Hungary) Ferencváros	4–0
1999–00	AEK Athens – (Georgia (country)) Torpedo Kutaisi	6–1
2000–01	AEK Athens – (Denmark) Herfølge	5–0
2001–02	AEK Athens – (Luxembourg) Grevenmacher	6–0
2002–03	AEK Athens – (Israel) Maccabi Haifa	4–0
2002–03	(Israel) Maccabi Haifa - AEK Athens	1–4
2007–08	AEK Athens – (Austria) Red Bull Salzburg	3–0
2009–10	AEK Athens – (Romania) Vaslui	3–0
2017–18	AEK Athens – (Belgium) Club Brugge	3–0
2020–21	(Ukraine) Zorya Luhansk - AEK Athens	1–4
UEFA Conference League
2024–25	(Andorra) Inter Club d'Escaldes – AEK Athens	0–4
2025–26	AEK Athens – (Scotland) Aberdeen	6–0
2025–26	(Slovenia) Celje – AEK Athens	0–4

== Records ==
- AEK Athens are the only club to have drawn all their games in the group stage of the Champions League (2002–03). It is the only club that has ever achieved six draws in six matches in a European competition.
- AEK Athens are the only Greek club to have participated in the quarter-finals round of all three European competitions at least once.
- AEK Athens are the only Greek club to have reached the semi-finals of the UEFA Cup (1976–77).
- AEK Athens are the only Greek club to have participated in the Champions League without losing a single game (2002–03).
- AEK Athens are the only Greek club to have participated in the Europa League without losing a single game (2017–18).
- AEK Athens are the only Greek club to have advanced to the quarter-final of European competitions 2 consecutive seasons (1996–97, 1997–98).
- AEK Athens are the only Greek club to have advanced to the round of 16 in European competitions for 4 consecutive seasons (1994–95, 1995–96, 1996–97, 1997–98).
- AEK Athens are the only Greek club to have advanced to the round of 16 in the Cup Winners' Cup for 3 consecutive seasons (1995–96, 1996–97, 1997–98).
- AEK Athens are the only Greek club to have advanced to the round of 16 in the UEFA Cup for 3 consecutive seasons (2000–01, 2001–02, 2002–03).
- AEK Athens are the only Greek club that has remained unbeaten for 14 consecutive European matches.
- AEK Athens are the first Greek club that reached the quarter-finals of the European Cup (1968–69).
- AEK Athens are the first Greek club that participated in the Champions League (1992–93).
- AEK Athens are the first Greek club that participated in the group stage of the Champions League (1994–95).
- AEK Athens are the first Greek club that reached the quarter-finals of all four European competitions.

== Runs ==
- Consecutive European games won: 4 (1996–97)
- Consecutive European games drawn: 6 (2002–03)
- Consecutive European games lost: 6 (2018–19)
- Consecutive European games without a win: 7 (2003–04)
- Consecutive European games without a draw: 20 (1977–89)
- Consecutive European games without a loss: 14 (2017–18) (domestic record)
- Consecutive European home games won: 6 (1975–77)
- Consecutive European home games drawn: 4 (2017–18)
- Consecutive European home games lost: 5 (2011–18)
- Consecutive European home games without a win: 6 (2018–19)
- Consecutive European home games without a draw: 12 (1970–77)
- Consecutive European home games without a loss: 12 (1997–2000)
- Consecutive European away games won: 2 (1996–97 and 2019–20)
- Consecutive European away games drawn: 3 (2002–03 and 2017–18)
- Consecutive European away games lost: 15 (1976–89)
- Consecutive European away games without a win: 15 (1976–89)
- Consecutive European away games without a draw: 19 (1975–91)
- Consecutive European away games without a loss: 7 (2017–18)
- Consecutive European games in which AEK scored: 12
- Consecutive European games in which AEK conceded: 8
- Consecutive European games without scoring: 5
- Consecutive European games without conceding: 3
