= 1959–60 Beşiktaş J.K. season =

Beşiktaş J.K.
1959–60 season
- President: (Turkey) Nuri Togay
- Manager: (Italy) Sandro Puppo
- National League: 1st

The 1959–60 season, was the second season of the Turkish First Football League. Beşiktaş finished first place, winning their first League title. Beşiktaş also qualified for the UEFA Champions League for the third time.

== Season ==
=== Turkish First Football League ===
Pos	Team	Pld	W	D	L	GF	GA	GD	Pts	Qualification
1	Beşiktaş (C)	38	29	7	2	68	15	+53	65	Qualification to European Cup preliminary round
2	Fenerbahçe	38	27	6	5	88	38	+50	60	Invitation to Balkans Cup
3	Galatasaray	38	24	10	4	74	23	+51	58	
4	İzmirspor	38	17	13	8	62	44	+18	47	
5	Ankara Demirspor	38	17	11	10	49	40	+9	45	

Source: rsssf.com
(C) Champions

== UEFA Ranking ==
Club Ranking for 1960 (UEFA Club Coefficients in parentheses)

- 53 (Denmark) København XI (0.500)
- 53 (Portugal) Sporting CP (0.500)
- 53 (Turkey) Beşiktaş J.K. (0.500)
- 53 (Poland) Gwardia Warsaw (0.500)
- 53 (Hungary) Honvéd Budapest (0.500)

Source: Full List
