= Iuliu Năftănăilă =

Romanian footballer

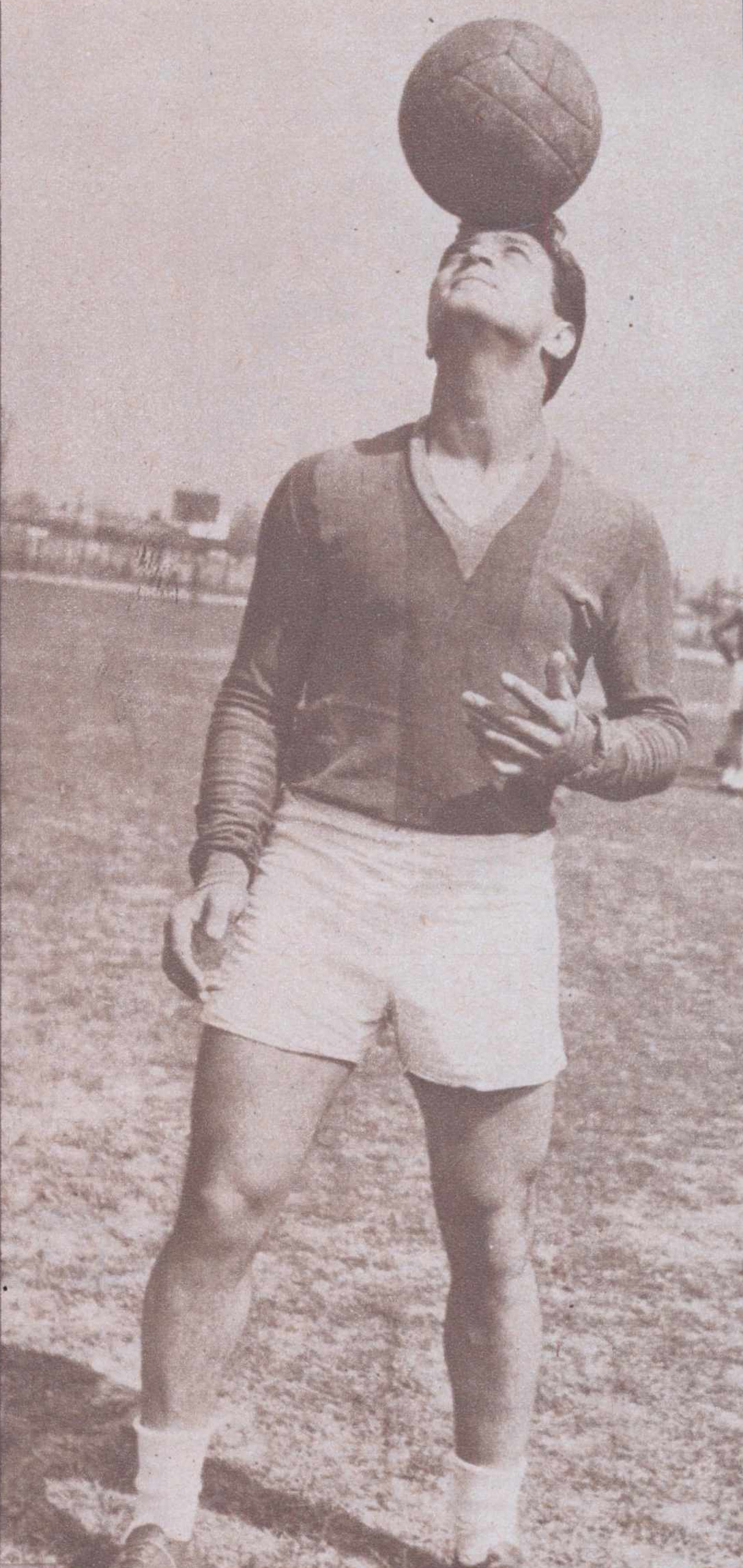
- Năftănăilă in 1963

Personal information
- Date of birth: 25 August 1942
- Place of birth: Făgăraș, Romania
- Date of death: 28 August 1967 (aged 25)
- Place of death: Făgăraș, Romania
- Height: 1.73 m (5 ft 8 in)
- Position: Central midfielder

Senior career*
Years	Team	Apps	(Gls)
1959–1961	Chimia Făgăraș		
1961–1967	Steagul Roșu Brașov	150	(37)

International career
1962–1966	Romania U23	12	(2)
1963–1965	Romania B	2	(0)
1967	Romania	3	(0)
- * Club domestic league appearances and goals

Iuliu Năftănăilă (25 August 1942 – 28 August 1967) was a Romanian football midfielder.

== Club career ==
Năftănăilă was born on 25 August 1942 in Făgăraș, Romania and began playing football in 1959 at local club Chimia in Divizia B. Two years later he was brought to Steagul Roșu Brașov by coach Silviu Ploeșteanu who gave him his Divizia A debut on 20 August 1961 in a 3–1 victory against Știința Cluj where he scored two goals. He netted a total of 11 goals until the end of the season as the club finished in fourth place. He remained at Steagul over the course of seven seasons, the highlights of this period included another fourth place in the 1964–65 Divizia A season and the winning of the 1960–61 Balkans Cup. Năftănăilă made his last Divizia A appearance on 27 August 1967 in a 0–0 draw against Argeș Pitești, totaling 150 matches with 37 goals in the competition. He also has a total of five matches and one goal scored in the Inter-Cities Fairs Cup, nine games with three goals in Cupa României and 11 appearances with three goals in the Balkans Cup.

== International career ==
Between 1962 and 1966, Năftănăilă made several appearances for Romania's under-23 and B squads.

Năftănăilă played three matches for Romania, making his debut on 4 January 1947 under coach Bazil Marian in a 1–1 friendly draw against Uruguay in Montevideo at Estadio Gran Parque Central. His second game was also a friendly which ended with a 2–1 away win over Greece. Năftănăilă's last appearance for the national team was in a 1–0 loss to Italy in the Euro 1968 qualifiers.

== Death ==
Năftănăilă died on 28 August 1967 at age 25 while driving his car and crashing into a tree on the side of the Brașov – Făgăraș road.

== Honours ==
Steagul Roșu Brașov

- Balkans Cup: 1960–61
