= Alexandru Meszaros =

Romanian footballer

Personal information
- Date of birth: 26 May 1933
- Place of birth: Târgu Mureș, Romania
- Date of death: 4 August 2016 (aged 83)
- Height: 1.72 m (5 ft 8 in)
- Position: Striker

Youth career
- 1946–1949: RATA Târgu Mureș
- 1950–1953: Voința Târgu Mureș

Senior career*
Years	Team	Apps	(Gls)
1953–1959	CS Târgu Mureș (Note: The 1957 championship called Cupa Primăverii is unofficial, so the appearances and goals scored at that competition for CS Târgu Mureș are not official, also the statistics for the 1953, 1954, 1955 Divizia A and the 1956, 1958–59 Divizia B seasons are unavailable.)	22	(1)
1959–1964	Steagul Roșu Brașov	97	(25)
Total		119	(26)

International career
1959	Romania Olympic	2	(0)

Managerial career
- 1975: Steagul Roșu Brașov
- * Club domestic league appearances and goals

Alexandru Meszaros (26 May 1933 - 4 August 2016) was a Romanian footballer who played as a striker.

== International career ==
Alexandru Meszaros played two games for Romania's Olympic team at the 1960 Summer Olympics qualifiers.

== Honours ==
Steagul Roșu Brașov

- Balkans Cup: 1960–61
