= 1960–61 Balkans Cup =

Tournament details
- Country: Balkans
- Teams: 5

Final positions
- Champions: (Romania) Steagul Roșu Brașov
- Runners-up: (Bulgaria) Levski Sofia

Tournament statistics
- Matches played: 20
- Goals scored: 59 (2.95 per match)

The 1960–61 Balkans Cup was the first edition of the Balkans Cup, a football competition for representative clubs from the Balkan states.

Yugoslavian runner-up Dinamo Zagreb chose to play in the first edition of the European Cup Winners' Cup, and no other Yugoslav team replaced them. The tournament was contested by 5 teams and Steagul Roșu Brașov won the trophy.

== Standings ==
Pos	Team	Pld	W	D	L	GF	GA	GR	Pts	Qualification
1	(Romania) Steagul Roșu Brașov (C)	8	5	3	0	18	7	2.571	13	Winners
2	(Bulgaria) Levski Sofia	8	3	2	3	16	11	1.455	8	
3	(Albania) Partizani Tirana	8	3	2	3	8	6	1.333	8	
4	(Turkey) Fenerbahçe	8	2	4	2	9	11	0.818	8	
5	(Greece) AEK Athens	8	1	1	6	8	24	0.333	3	

Source: rsssf.com
Rules for classification: 1) points; 2) goal average; 3) number of goals scored
(C) Champions

== Matches ==
8 January 1961

Fenerbahçe (Turkey)	0–0	(Bulgaria) Levski Sofia

Şükrü Saracoğlu, Istanbul

15 February 1961

AEK Athens (Greece)	2–4	(Romania) Steagul Roșu Brașov
Nestoridis 24'; Petridis 81'	Report	Năftănăilă 29'; Meszaros 36'; Szigeti 50'; Nagy 64' (pen.)

AEK Stadium, Athens
Attendance: 25,000
Referee: Mustafa Gerceker (Turkey)

9 March 1961

Steagul Roșu Brașov (Romania)	1–0	(Albania) Partizani Tirana
Haşoti 5'

Tractorul, Brașov
Attendance: 18,000

29 March 1961

AEK Athens (Greece)	2–2	(Turkey) Fenerbahçe
Nestoridis 39' (pen.); Petridis 40'	Report	Aytaç 13'; Gündüz 61'

Nea Filadelfeia, Athens
Attendance: 18,500
Referee: Konstantin Dinov (Bulgaria)

29 March 1961

Partizani Tirana (Albania)	2–0	(Bulgaria) Levski Sofia

Dinamo, Tirana

12 April 1961

Levski Sofia (Bulgaria)	4–0	(Turkey) Fenerbahçe
Peev 19'; Dirimlili 24' (o.g.); Iordanov 51' (pen.); Abadjev 70'

Rakovski, Sofia

21 April 1961

Fenerbahçe (Turkey)	1–1	(Romania) Steagul Roșu Brașov
Gündüz 44'		David 51'

Ankara 19 Mayıs, Ankara
Attendance: 65,000

26 April 1961

Fenerbahçe (Turkey)	5–1	(Greece) AEK Athens
Küçükandonyadis 3', 26'; Gündüz 17'; Bartu 20'; Has 41'	Report	Tsachouridis 49'

Şükrü Saracoğlu, Istanbul
Attendance: 20,000
Referee: Stelian Mataiser (Romania)

17 May 1961

AEK Athens (Greece)	3–1	(Bulgaria) Levski Sofia
Nestoridis 44', 66'; Gouvas 74'	Report	Sokolov 32'

Nea Filadelfeia, Athens
Attendance: 15,000
Referee: Cezmi Basar (Turkey)

20 August 1961

Fenerbahçe (Turkey)	1–0	(Albania) Partizani Tirana
Doğan 13'

Şükrü Saracoğlu, Istanbul

28 September 1961

Steagul Roșu Brașov (Romania)	2–2	(Bulgaria) Levski Sofia

Tineretului, Brașov

30 September 1961

Partizani Tirana (Albania)	0–0	(Turkey) Fenerbahçe

Dinamo, Tirana

12 October 1961

Levski Sofia (Bulgaria)	4–0	(Albania) Partizani Tirana

Rakovski, Sofia

22 October 1961

Steagul Roșu Brașov (Romania)	3–0	(Turkey) Fenerbahçe
Nagy 8'; Meszaros 11', 37'

Tineretului, Brașov

5 November 1961

Partizani Tirana (Albania)	0–0	(Romania) Steagul Roșu Brașov

Dinamo, Tirana

15 November 1961

Levski Sofia (Bulgaria)	2–4	(Romania) Steagul Roșu Brașov
Szeredai		Meszaros; David

Rakovski, Sofia
Attendance: 20,000

Steagul Roșu Brașov (Romania)	2–0 (Awarded)^{1}	(Greece) AEK Athens

Levski Sofia (Bulgaria)	2–0 (Awarded)^{1}	(Greece) AEK Athens

Partizani Tirana (Albania)	2–0 (Awarded)^{1}	(Greece) AEK Athens

AEK Athens (Greece)	0–2 (Awarded)^{1}	(Albania) Partizani Tirana

Notes

- Note 1: After Steagul Roșu Brașov won the trophy on 15 November 1961, AEK Athens withdrew from the tournament.
