= 2006–07 AEK Athens F.C. season =

AEK Athens
2006–07 season
- Chairman: Demis Nikolaidis
- Manager: Lorenzo Serra Ferrer
- Stadium: Athens Olympic Stadium
- Super League: 2nd
- Greek Cup: Round of 32
- UEFA Champions League: Group stage
- UEFA Cup: Round of 32
- Top goalscorer: League: Nikos Liberopoulos (18); All: Nikos Liberopoulos (20)
- Highest home attendance: 56,203 vs Milan (21 November 2006)
- Lowest home attendance: 12,992 vs Ergotelis (30 September 2006)
- Average home league attendance: 17,244
- Biggest win: AEK Athens 5–0 AEL
- Biggest defeat: AEK Athens 1–4 Panathinaikos; Milan 3–0 AEK Athens
Home colours	Away colours	Third colours

The 2006–07 season was the 83rd season in the existence of AEK Athens F.C. and the 48th consecutive season in the top flight of Greek football. They competed in the Super League, the Greek Cup, the UEFA Champions League and the UEFA Cup. The season began on 9 August 2006 and finished on 13 May 2007.

== Kits ==
Supplier: Adidas
Sponsor(s): LG Corp
Features: Diners Club, Forthnet

Home	Away	Third

== Overview ==
The third season in a row for the presidency of Demis Nikolaidis, who decided at the end of the previous season that it was time to part ways with the team with Fernando Santos, despite the good presence of the Portuguese technician on the team's bench. The reason was that the president of AEK was looking for a coach who played more offensive style and gave a lot of weight to young players and the team's academies. Nikolaidis ended up with the acclaimed Spanish coach Lorenzo Serra Ferrer, who, among other things, has served in the academies and in the first team of the great Barcelona. One of the team's key leaders, Kostas Katsouranis, left AEK, following Santos to Benfica. On the other hand, Akis Zikos returned after a four-year absence in Monaco.

AEK started the season relatively "numb", but then recovered and especially from the 7th matchday onwards when they makes 7 consecutive victories. Another streak of 6 wins later in the 2nd round, but those were not enough to achieve more than the eventual second place finish. They finished 8 points above Panathinaikos, but another 9 below the champion Olympiacos. For yet another season, however, there were complaints from many teams in the league about the treatment of the red and whites by the referees.

In the Greek Cup, AEK was a surprise victim, eliminated in the first round by the team of Chaidari in a single match, after the 0–0 in regular time, a score that did not change even in extra time, despite the expulsion of 2 players of Chaidari, while in the penalty shootout Chaidari won by 5–4.

AEK's chance for their fourth participation in the groups of the Champions League passed through the matches with the Scottish Hearts, an opponent that was not easy, but certainly not intimidating either. First match at Murrayfield Stadium, Serra Ferrer showed a super attacking AEK, who missed many chances in the first half. In the replay, Serra Ferrer's team slowed down and Hearts made it 1–0. Finally, the Greek team found the way to the net at the end of the game and in the overtime they made their big comeback. The final score was 1–2 and qualification was very close for the yellow-blacks. In the second leg in Athens in front of over 45,000 people, AEK's superiority was clear again from the start of the match had the full control, missed some chances, but failed to score. With 3 goals towards the end of the game, AEK finally got a very nice qualification with two wins. AEK competed again in Champions League groups after 3 years and were drawn in the 8th group with the eventual winner of the institution, Milan, Lille and Anderlecht. There, AEK with a total of 2 wins, including a home win against the great Milan, 2 draws and 2 losses they finished 3rd and were out of the competition, continuing in the UEFA Cup.

AEK were drawn with Paris Saint-Germain for the round of 32 and their task was certainly not easy at all. First match on February 14 at Olympic Stadium in front of around 30,000 spectators, Ferrer in a rather incomprehensible decision, decided to rest some players. However, Paul Le Guen was doing something similar by leaving some of his key players on the bench. At the end of the first half, Paris opened the score, while in the replay, AEK again conceded a goal at the end of the game. The qualification was already essentially over for AEK, while it was noteworthy that during the match Demis Nikolaidis was strongly disapproved of by a large part of the world for the relaxed attitude shown by AEK in the match. The rematch at the Parc des Princes was more formal than essential and Le Guen decided to start with a line-up with several reserves, while Ferrer on the other hand made a mix-up in the line-up. The French once again scored at the end of each half and won with the same score and the European campaign of the yellow-blacks ended there.

The greatest wins of the season were a 5–0 against AEL, a 4–0 against Panionios and a 1–2 victory over Panathinaikos, away from home. The top scorer of the team and of the league was Nikos Liberopoulos with 18 goals.

== Management team ==
Position	Staff
Manager	(Spain) Lorenzo Serra Ferrer
Assistant manager	(Spain) Pep Segura
Goalkeeping coach	(Serbia and Montenegro) Slobodan Šujica
Fitness coach	(Spain) Pep Alomar
Director of Football	(Serbia and Montenegro) Ilija Ivić
Technical director	(Netherlands) Eugène Gerards
Academy director	(North Macedonia) Toni Savevski
Academy manager	(Albania) Bledar Kola
Scout	(Netherlands) Eugène Gerards
Scout	(Greece) Dimitris Markos
Head of Medical	(Greece) Lakis Nikolaou

== Players ==
=== Squad information ===
NOTE: The players are the ones that have been announced by the AEK Athens' press release. No edits should be made unless a player arrival or exit is announced. Updated 13 May 2007, 23:59 UTC+3.

No.	Player	Nat.	Position(s)	Date of birth (Age)	Signed	Previous club	Transfer fee	Contract until
Goalkeepers
22	Dionysis Chiotis (Vice-captain 2)	(Greece)	GK	4 June 1977 (aged 30)	1995	(Greece) AEK Athens U20	—	2007
28	Stefano Sorrentino	(Italy)	GK	28 March 1979 (aged 28)	2005	(Italy) Torino	Free	2010
84	Giannis Arabatzis	(Greece)	GK	28 May 1984 (aged 23)	2002	(Greece) Enosi Apostolou Pavlou	€22,000	2007
—	Antonis Lykouris	(Greece)	GK	13 January 1986 (aged 21)	2006	(Greece) AEK Athens U20	—	2009
Defenders
4	Vangelis Moras	(Greece)	CB / DM / RB	26 August 1981 (aged 25)	2003	(Greece) Proodeftiki	€260,000	2007
5	Bruno Cirillo	(Italy)	CB / RB	21 March 1977 (aged 30)	2005	(Italy) Lecce	Free	2008
6	Georgios Alexopoulos	(Greece)	CB / RB	7 February 1977 (aged 30)	2005	(Greece) Egaleo	Free	2008
13	Martin Pautasso	(Argentina)	RB / RM	17 May 1979 (aged 28)	2006	(Argentina) Independiente	Free	2010
14	Stavros Tziortziopoulos	(Greece)	LB / CB / LM	15 August 1978 (aged 28)	2004	(Greece) Panionios	Free	2007
15	Sokratis Papastathopoulos	(Greece)	CB / RB / LB / DM	9 June 1988 (aged 19)	2005	(Greece) Apollon Petalidiou	Free	2008
31	Nikolaos Georgeas	(Greece)	RB / LB / DM	27 December 1976 (aged 30)	2001	(Greece) Kalamata	€1,500,000	2008
55	Traianos Dellas (Captain)	(Greece)	CB	31 January 1976 (aged 31)	2005	(Italy) Roma	Free	2007
81	Nikolaos Kourkoulas	(Greece)	CB	11 March 1989 (aged 18)	2006	(Greece) AEK Athens U20	—	2009
90	Savvas Gentsoglou	(Greece)	CB / DM / CM	19 September 1990 (aged 16)	2006	(Greece) AEK Athens U20	—	2009
Midfielders
1	Pantelis Kafes	(Greece)	CM / DM / AM / RM / LM	24 June 1978 (aged 29)	2007	(Greece) Olympiacos	Free	2009
7	Ilias Kyriakidis	(Greece)	DM / CM / AM	5 August 1985 (aged 21)	2004	(Greece) Ionikos	€200,000	2009
10	Panagiotis Kone	(Greece) (Albania)	AM / RM / LM / RW / LW / CM	26 July 1987 (aged 19)	2005	(France) Lens U19	Free	2010
11	Gustavo Manduca	(Brazil)	RM / AM / RW / LM / LW / CM / SS / ST	8 June 1980 (aged 27)	2006	(Portugal) Benfica	Free	2007
16	Akis Zikos	(Greece)	DM / CM	1 June 1974 (aged 33)	2006	(France) Monaco	Free	2008
17	Vladan Ivić	(Serbia and Montenegro)	AM / CM / RM / LM	7 May 1977 (aged 30)	2004	(Germany) Borussia Mönchengladbach	Free	2007
19	Panagiotis Lagos	(Greece)	LM / LW / LB / CM / DM	18 July 1985 (aged 21)	2006	(Greece) Iraklis	€900,000	2010
20	Vasilios Pliatsikas	(Greece)	DM / CM / RB / CB	20 April 1988 (aged 19)	2005	(Greece) Chaidari	Free	2010
23	Vasilios Lakis	(Greece)	RM / RW / AM / CM / RB	10 September 1976 (aged 30)	2005	(England) Crystal Palace	Free	2008
25	Emerson	(Brazil)	DM / CM	12 April 1972 (aged 35)	2006	(Greece) Skoda Xanthi	€150,000	2007
56	Përparim Hetemaj	(Finland) (Serbia)	CM / DM / AM / RM / LM / RW / LW	12 December 1986 (aged 20)	2006	(Finland) HJK Helsinki	€450,000	2010
88	Dániel Tőzsér	(Hungary)	AM / CM / DM / LM	12 May 1985 (aged 22)	2006	(Hungary) Ferencváros	€150,000	2010
92	Georgios Paligeorgos	(Greece)	DM / CM	9 February 1990 (aged 17)	2006	(Greece) AEK Athens U20	—	2011
Forwards
33	Nikos Liberopoulos (Vice-captain)	(Greece)	SS / ST / AM	4 August 1975 (aged 31)	2003	(Greece) Panathinaikos	Free	2009
35	Pantelis Kapetanos	(Greece)	ST / RW	8 June 1983 (aged 24)	2006	(Greece) Iraklis	€400,000	2011
79	Leonidas Kampantais	(Greece)	ST / SS / RW	8 March 1982 (aged 25)	2004	(Greece) Aris	Free	2007
83	Michalis Pavlis	(Greece)	SS / ST / RW / LW	22 September 1989 (aged 17)	2006	(Greece) AEK Athens U20	—	2011
99	Júlio César	(Brazil)	LW / SS / AM / RW / ST	26 February 1980 (aged 27)	2005	(Portugal) Gil Vicente	€540,000	2009
Left during Winter Transfer Window
24	Ifeanyi Udeze	(Nigeria)	LB / CB	21 July 1980 (aged 26)	2006	(Greece) PAOK	Free	2009
—	Panagiotis Stergiatos	(Greece)	CB	3 March 1986 (aged 21)	2003	(Greece) AEK Athens U20	—	2008
—	Vasilios Vallianos	(Greece)	LB	11 September 1988 (aged 18)	2006	(Greece) AEK Athens U20	—	2011
8	Miltiadis Sapanis	(Greece)	CM / LM / AM	28 January 1976 (aged 31)	2005	(Greece) Panathinaikos	Free	2008
—	Nikolaos Kaltsas	(Greece)	DM / CM / AM / RM	28 June 1989 (aged 18)	2006	(Greece) AEK Athens U20	—	2011
9	Andrija Delibašić	(Montenegro)	ST	24 April 1981 (aged 26)	2006	(Spain) Mallorca	Free	2007

== Transfers ==
=== In ===
==== Summer ====
No.	Pos.	Player	From	Fee	Date	Contract Until	Source
13	DF	(Argentina) Martin Pautasso	(Argentina) Independiente	Free transfer	5 July 2006	30 June 2010	
15	DF	(Greece) Sokratis Papastathopoulos	(Greece) Niki Volos	Loan return	1 July 2006	30 June 2011	
16	MF	(Greece) Akis Zikos	(France) Monaco	Free transfer	14 August 2006	30 June 2008	
19	MF	(Greece) Panagiotis Lagos	(Greece) Iraklis	€900,000	12 July 2006	30 June 2010	
24	DF	(Nigeria) Ifeanyi Udeze	(Greece) PAOK	Free transfer	11 August 2006	30 June 2009	
56	MF	(Finland) Përparim Hetemaj	(Finland) HJK Helsinki	€450,000	15 June 2006	30 June 2010	
79	FW	(Greece) Leonidas Kampantais	(Greece) Panionios	Loan return	1 July 2006	30 June 2007	
81	DF	(Greece) Nikolaos Kourkoulas	(Greece) AEK Athens U20	Promotion	1 July 2006	30 June 2010	
83	FW	(Greece) Michalis Pavlis	(Greece) AEK Athens U20	Promotion	1 July 2006	30 June 2011	
85	GK	(Greece) Giannis Fysekis	(Greece) Ethnikos Alexandroupoli	Free transfer	25 July 2006	30 June 2011	
88	MF	(Hungary) Dániel Tőzsér	(Hungary) Ferencváros	€150,000	8 June 2006	30 June 2010	
92	MF	(Greece) Georgios Paligeorgos	(Greece) AEK Athens U20	Promotion	1 July 2006	30 June 2011	
—	GK	(Greece) Antonis Lykouris	(Greece) AEK Athens U20	Promotion	1 July 2006	30 June 2009	
—	DF	(Greece) Panagiotis Stergiatos	(Greece) Doxa Drama	Loan return	1 July 2006	30 June 2008	
—	DF	(Greece) Vasilios Vallianos	(Greece) AEK Athens U20	Promotion	1 July 2006	30 June 2011	
—	MF	(Greece) Nikolaos Kaltsas	(Greece) AEK Athens U20	Promotion	1 July 2006	30 June 2011	
—	MF	(Greece) Nikos Pourtoulidis	(Greece) Thrasyvoulos	Loan return	1 July 2006	30 June 2006	
—	MF	(Greece) Dimitris Karameris	(Greece) Apollon Smyrnis	Loan return	1 July 2006	30 June 2010	
—	MF	(Greece) Manolis Tsagarogiannakis	(Greece) Agia Paraskevi	Loan return	1 July 2006	30 June 2009	
—	FW	(Cyprus) Simos Krassas	(Greece) Panionios	Loan return	1 July 2006	30 June 2008	

==== Winter ====
No.	Pos.	Player	From	Fee	Date	Contract Until	Source
1	MF	(Greece) Pantelis Kafes	(Greece) Olympiacos	Free transfer	29 January 2007	30 June 2009	
90	DF	(Greece) Savvas Gentsoglou	(Greece) AEK Athens U20	Promotion	31 November 2006	30 June 2009	
—	DF	(Greece) Dimitrios Koutromanos	(Greece) Thrasyvoulos	Loan termination	1 January 2007	30 June 2011	
—	MF	(Cyprus) Georgios Tofas	(Cyprus) Enosis Neon Paralimni	Free transfer	1 January 2007	30 June 2010	
—	FW	(Greece) Angelos Komvolidis	(Greece) Thrasyvoulos	Loan termination	1 January 2007	30 June 2010	

=== Out ===
==== Summer ====
No.	Pos.	Player	To	Fee	Date	Source
3	DF	(Serbia) Nikola Malbaša	(Germany) TuS Koblenz	Contract termination	1 July 2006	
7	FW	(Brazil) Alessandro Soares	(Cyprus) Anorthosis Famagusta	End of contract	1 July 2006	
11	FW	(Ukraine) Oleh Venhlinskyi	(Ukraine) Chornomorets Odesa	Contract termination	29 June 2006	
21	MF	(Greece) Kostas Katsouranis	(Portugal) Benfica	€2,300,000^{[a]}	22 June 2006	
24	DF	(Greece) Christos Kontis	(Cyprus) APOEL	Contract termination	1 July 2006	
27	MF	(Sweden) Louay Chanko	(Sweden) Hammarby	Contract termination	2 August 2006	
—	MF	(Greece) Nikos Pourtoulidis	(Greece) Asteras Tripolis	End of contract	1 July 2006	
—	MF	(Greece) Dimitris Karameris	(Greece) Thiva	End of contract	1 July 2006	
—	FW	(Cyprus) Simos Krassas	(Greece) Apollon Kalamarias	Contract termination	26 July 2006	

Notes

a. plus 25% of resale fee and the incomes from their scheduled friendly game which came to be €294,390.

==== Winter ====
No.	Pos.	Player	To	Fee	Date	Source
8	MF	(Greece) Miltiadis Sapanis	(Cyprus) APOEL	Free transfer	10 January 2007	
9	FW	(Montenegro) Andrija Delibašić	(Spain) Mallorca	Loan termintion	30 January 2007	
24	DF	(Nigeria) Ifeanyi Udeze	(Nigeria) Bendel Insurance	Contract termintion	30 January 2007	

=== Loan in ===
==== Summer ====
No.	Pos.	Player	From	Fee	Date	Until	Option to buy	Source
9	FW	(Montenegro) Andrija Delibašić	(Spain) Mallorca	Free	17 August 2006	30 June 2007	✓	
11	MF	(Brazil) Gustavo Manduca	(Portugal) Benfica	Free	4 August 2006	30 June 2007	✓	

=== Loan out ===
==== Summer ====
No.	Pos.	Player	To	Fee	Date	Until	Option to buy	Source
18	FW	(Greece) Angelos Komvolidis	(Greece) Thrasyvoulos	Free	17 August 2006	30 June 2007	✗	
27	MF	(Greece) Christos Bourbos	(Greece) Kerkyra	Free	17 August 2006	30 June 2007	✗	
85	GK	(Greece) Giannis Fysekis	(Greece) Anagennisi Karditsa	Free	1 August 2006	30 June 2007	✗	
87	DF	(Greece) Dimitrios Koutromanos	(Greece) Thrasyvoulos	Free	17 August 2006	30 June 2007	✗	
—	MF	(Greece) Manolis Tsagarogiannakis	(Greece) Thiva	Free	1 July 2006	30 June 2008	✗	
—	MF	(Greece) Panagiotis Zorbas	(Greece) Niki Volos	Free	17 August 2006	30 June 2007	✗	

==== Winter ====
No.	Pos.	Player	To	Fee	Date	Until	Option to buy	Source
—	DF	(Greece) Dimitrios Koutromanos	(Greece) Ethnikos Piraeus	Free	6 January 2007	30 June 2007	✗	
—	DF	(Greece) Panagiotis Stergiatos	(Greece) Anagennisi Karditsa	Free	27 December 2006	30 June 2007	✗	
—	DF	(Greece) Vasilios Vallianos	(Greece) Anagennisi Karditsa	Free	27 December 2006	30 June 2007	✗	
—	MF	(Greece) Nikolaos Kaltsas	(Greece) Anagennisi Karditsa	Free	27 December 2006	30 June 2007	✗	
—	MF	(Cyprus) Georgios Tofas	(Greece) Ethnikos Piraeus	Free	1 January 2007	30 June 2007	✗	
—	FW	(Greece) Angelos Komvolidis	(Greece) Ethnikos Piraeus	Free	6 January 2007	30 June 2007	✗	

=== Contract renewals ===
No.	Pos.	Player	Date	Former Exp. Date	New Exp. Date	Source
33	FW	(Greece) Nikos Liberopoulos	19 July 2006	30 June 2006	30 June 2009	

=== Overall transfer activity ===
==== Expenditure ====
Summer: ▼€1,500,000

Winter: ▼€0

Total: ▼€1,500,000

==== Income ====
Summer: ▲€2,300,000

Winter: ▲€0

Total: ▲€2,300,000

==== Net Totals ====
Summer: ▲€800,000

Winter: €0

Total: ▲€800,000

== Pre-season and friendlies ==
11 July 2006 Friendly	Grödig	0–5	AEK Athens	Flachau
19:30 EEST (UTC+3)		Report	Kampantais 19'; Liberopoulos 55', 82', 90'; Lakis 58'	Stadium: Sportplatz Flachau

15 July 2006 Friendly	Wacker Burghausen	0–4	AEK Athens	Flachau
19:00 EEST (UTC+3)		Report	César 9'; Kapetanos 26'; Kyriakidis 69'; Tőzsér 74'	Stadium: Sportplatz Flachau

19 July 2006 Friendly	Příbram	1–1	AEK Athens	Bischofshofen
19:30 EEST (UTC+3)	Penner (yellow card) (yellow card) (yellow card); Lesák 24'	Report	Pliatsikas 87'	Stadium: Sportplatz Bischofshofen

22 July 2006 Friendly	Napoli	0–1	AEK Athens	Flachau
20:00 EEST (UTC+3)		Report	Pliatsikas 69'	Stadium: Sportplatz Flachau; Attendance: 300
Note: The match ended at the 82nd minute due to darkness.

1 August 2006 Friendly	AEK Athens	3–1	Benfica	Marousi
20:00 EEST (UTC+3)	Georgeas (yellow card); Kapetanos 19', 40'; Liberopoulos 23'		Jorge 45'	Stadium: Olympic Stadium; Attendance: 20,183; Referee: Giorgos Kasnaferis (Argolida)

3 August 2006 Friendly	Chaidari	3–1	AEK Athens	Haidari
18:00 EEST (UTC+3)	Tsabouris 47'; Nedeljković 52' (pen.); Koukoutselas 67'	Report	Lakis 89'	Stadium: Takis Charalambidis Stadium

12 August 2006 Friendly	Ionikos	1–1	AEK Athens	Nikaia
21:00 EEST (UTC+3)	Onwuachi 32'	Report	Hetemaj 36'	Stadium: Neapoli Stadium

3 September 2006 Friendly	Niki Volos	2–2	AEK Athens	Volos
19:00 EEST (UTC+3)	Maceratesi 5'; Pavlidis 79'	Report	Cirillo 64'; César 85'	Stadium: Panthessaliko Stadium

17 May 2007 Friendly	AEK Athens	2–0	Anagennisi Karditsa	Thrakomakedones
17:00 EEST (UTC+3)	Tőzsér; Kampantais	Report		Stadium: AEK Athens' training complex

27 May 2007 Friendly	Benfica	2–1	AEK Athens	East Rutherford
21:15 EEST (UTC+3)	Nélson (yellow card) 8'; Rui Costa (yellow card) 15', (goal) 74'; Bourbos 34' (o.g.)	Report	Rovérsio (yellow card); Manduca 6'; Kyriakidis (yellow card) 23'; César (yellow card) 38'; Bourbos (yellow card) 65'	Stadium: Giants Stadium; Attendance: 20,000; Referee: Kevin Stott (USA)

== Competitions ==
=== Overall record ===
Competition	First match	Last match	Starting round	Final position	Record							
Competition	First match	Last match	Starting round	Final position	Pld	W	D	L	GF	GA	GD	Win %
Super League	19 August 2006	13 May 2007	Matchday 1	2nd	30	18	8	4	60	27	+33	60.00
Greek Cup	9 November 2006	9 November 2006	Round of 32	Round of 32	1	0	1	0	0	0	+0	0.00
UEFA Champions League	9 August 2006	6 December 2006	Third qualifying round	Group stage	8	4	2	2	11	10	+1	50.00
UEFA Cup	14 February 2007	22 February 2007	Round of 32	Round of 32	2	0	0	2	0	4	−4	0.00
Total					41	22	11	8	71	41	+30	53.66

Last updated: 13 May 2007
Source: Competitions

=== Super League Greece ===
==== League table ====
Pos	Team	Pld	W	D	L	GF	GA	GD	Pts	Qualification or relegation
1	Olympiacos (C)	30	22	5	3	62	23	+39	71	Qualification for the Champions League group stage
2	AEK Athens	30	18	8	4	60	27	+33	62	Qualification for the Champions League third qualifying round
3	Panathinaikos	30	16	6	8	47	28	+19	54	Qualification for the UEFA Cup first round
4	Aris	30	11	13	6	32	26	+6	46	Qualification for the UEFA Cup first round
5	Panionios	30	12	9	9	33	31	+2	45 (Note: Head-to-head record: PAOK–Panionios 1–1, Panionios–PAOK 3–1.)	Qualification for the UEFA Cup first round

Source: Super League Greece
Rules for classification: 1st points; 2nd head-to-head points; 3rd head-to-head goal difference; 4th decision match.
(C) Champions

==== Results summary ====
Overall								Home						Away					
Pld	W	D	L	GF	GA	GD	Pts	W	D	L	GF	GA	GD	W	D	L	GF	GA	GD
30	18	8	4	60	27	+33	62	11	3	1	40	13	+27	7	5	3	20	14	+6

Source: Super League Greece

==== Results by Matchday ====
Round	1	2	3	4	5	6	7	8	9	10	11	12	13	14	15	16	17	18	19	20	21	22	23	24	25	26	27	28	29	30
Ground	H	A	A	H	A	H	A	H	A	H	H	A	H	A	H	A	H	H	A	H	A	H	A	H	A	A	H	A	H	A
Result	D	D	D	W	L	W	W	W	W	W	W	W	W	D	W	L	W	W	D	D	D	L	W	W	W	W	W	W	D	L
Position	9	9	10	5	9	5	3	3	3	3	3	3	2	2	2	2	2	2	2	2	2	3	3	3	2	2	2	2	2	2

Updated to match(es) played on 13 May 2007. Source: slgr.gr
A = Away; H = Home; W = Win; D = Draw; L = Loss; P = Postponed

==== Matches ====
19 August 2006 1	AEK Athens	0–0	PAOK	Marousi
21:00 EEST (UTC+3)	Tziortziopoulos (yellow card) 41'; Kapetanos (yellow card) 79'; Cirillo (yellow card) 82'	Report	Rebosio (yellow card) 36'; Mięciel (yellow card) 37'; Arabatzis (yellow card) 67' (yellow-red card) 87'; Fernandes (yellow card) 79'; Zagorakis (yellow card) 89'	Stadium: Olympic Stadium; Attendance: 23,109; Referee: Iraklis Tsikinis (Messinia)

27 August 2006 2	OFI	1–1	AEK Athens	Heraklion
19:00 EEST (UTC+3)	Sifakis (yellow card) 42'; Kounenakis (yellow card) 70'; Nwafor 73'; Sylla (yellow card) 90+1'	Report	Delibašić 33'; Ivić (yellow card) 35'; Emerson (yellow card) 39'; Liberopoulos (yellow card) 69'	Stadium: Pankritio Stadium; Attendance: 6,628; Referee: Giannis Tsachilidis (Piraeus)

9 2006 3	Atromitos	1–1	AEK Athens	Peristeri
19:00 EEST (UTC+3)	Sanokho (yellow card) 48'; Koutsis 66'; Pagonis (yellow card) 84'; Koutsis (yellow card) 88'	Report	Emerson (yellow card) 74'; Pautasso 86'; Delibašić (yellow card) 90+2'	Stadium: Peristeri Stadium; Attendance: 2,620; Referee: Konstantinos Papastamatis (Athens)

18 September 2006 4	AEK Athens	3–0	Iraklis	Marousi
19:00 EEST (UTC+3)	Liberopoulos 5', 54'; Udeze (yellow card) 10'; Georgeas (yellow card) 39'; Lakis 90+1'	Report	Papasterianos (yellow card) 65'	Stadium: Olympic Stadium; Attendance: 16,029; Referee: Charalabos Karatzas (Euboea)

23 September 2006 5	Olympiacos	1–0	AEK Athens	Piraeus
19:00 EEST (UTC+3)	Đorđević (yellow card) 27' (yellow-red card) 47'; Emerson 45' (o.g.); Konstantinou (yellow card) 81'	Report	Zikos (yellow card) 16'; César (yellow card) 34'; Chiotis (yellow card) 45'; Liberopoulos (yellow card) 45+1'; Sorrentino (yellow card) 67'; Lakis (yellow card) 79'; Ivić (yellow card) 85'	Stadium: Karaiskakis Stadium; Attendance: 29,101; Referee: Kyros Vassaras (Thessaloniki)

30 September 2006 6	AEK Athens	3–1	Ergotelis	Marousi
21:00 EEST (UTC+3)	Tőzsér 51', (yellow card) 52'; Liberopoulos 61'; Kyriakidis (yellow card) 79'; Lakis 85'; Manduca (yellow card) 90+4'	Report	Hieblinger (yellow card) 28'; Iachtchouk 43', (yellow card) 76' (yellow-red card) 90'	Stadium: Olympic Stadium; Attendance: 12,992; Referee: Anastasios Kakos (Corfu)

23 October 2006 7	Panathinaikos	1–2	AEK Athens	Marousi
19:00 EEST (UTC+3)	Papadopoulos 25'; Goumas (yellow card) 27'; Salpingidis (yellow card) 44'; Šerić (yellow card) 47'	Report	Manduca 28' (pen.); Dellas 76'; Zikos (yellow card) 77'	Stadium: Olympic Stadium; Attendance: 33,199; Referee: Giorgos Kasnaferis (Argolida)

28 October 2006 8	AEK Athens	1–0	Apollon Kalamarias	Marousi
21:00 EEST (UTC+3)	César 28'	Report	El Halwani (yellow card) 21'; Fytanidis (yellow card) 69'	Stadium: Olympic Stadium; Attendance: 14,373; Referee: Romanos Kontogiannidis (Xanthi)

5 November 2006 9	Aris	1–3	AEK Athens	Thessaloniki
19:00 EET (UTC+2)	Kyriakos 5'; Chalkias (yellow card) 30'; Papadopoulos (yellow card) 32'; Kouloucheris (yellow card) 43'; Nebegleras (yellow card) 88'	Report	Dellas (yellow card) 8'; Sorrentino (yellow card) 38'; Liberopoulos 58'; César 69'; Kampantais 77'; Hetemaj (yellow card) 90+1'	Stadium: Kleanthis Vikelidis Stadium; Attendance: 6,718; Referee: Giannis Tsachilidis (Piraeus)

12 November 2006 10	AEK Athens	5–0	AEL	Marousi
19:00 EET (UTC+2)	Manduca 10'; Liberopoulos 57'; César (yellow card) 66'; Lagos 85'; Tziortziopoulos 87'; Kampantais 90+3'	Report	Galitsios (yellow card) 49'	Stadium: Olympic Stadium; Attendance: 14,929; Referee: Giannis Stavridis (Pieria)

18 November 2006 11	AEK Athens	4–1	Kerkyra	Marousi
15:00 EET (UTC+2)	César 23'; Liberopoulos 30' (pen.), 48'; Manduca 41' (pen.); Kone (yellow card) 60'; Tziortziopoulos (yellow card) 85'	Report	Gustavinho 2'; Toskas (yellow card) 20' (yellow-red card) 29'; Karadimos (yellow card) 36'; Anastasiadis (yellow card) 61'; Kagiouzis (yellow card) 81'; Zacharopoulos (yellow card) 84'	Stadium: Olympic Stadium; Attendance: 14,706; Referee: Ilias Mazarakos (Arta)

25 November 2006 12	Egaleo	1–2	AEK Athens	Egaleo
19:00 EET (UTC+2)	Psomas (yellow card) 30'; Nikolopoulos 33'; Edusei (yellow card) 39'; Agritis (yellow card) 63'; Szymanek (yellow card) 72'	Report	César 31' (pen.), 73' (pen.); Cirillo (red card) 35'; Kampantais (yellow card) 65' (yellow-red card) 83'	Stadium: Stavros Mavrothalassitis Stadium; Attendance: 2,882; Referee: Dimitris Kalopoulos (Thessaloniki)

2 December 2006 13	AEK Athens	2–0	Ionikos	Marousi
19:00 EET (UTC+2)	César 37', 75'	Report	Zavagno (yellow card) 9'; Vourexakis (yellow card) 50'	Stadium: Olympic Stadium; Attendance: 14,323; Referee: Theodoros Gaitatzis (Drama)

10 December 2006 14	Skoda Xanthi	0–0	AEK Athens	Xanthi
16:45 EET (UTC+2)	Zikos (yellow card) 34'; Tőzsér (yellow card) 57'; Papastathopoulos (yellow card) 71'	Report	Quintana (yellow card) 17'; Fliskas (yellow card) 64'; Vryzas (yellow card) 87'	Stadium: Skoda Xanthi Arena; Attendance: 4,967; Referee: Thanasis Briakos (Epirus)

17 December 2006 15	AEK Athens	4–0	Panionios	Marousi
19:00 EET (UTC+2)	Liberopoulos 24', 53', 70'; Kampantais (yellow card) 58', (goal) 77'; Zikos (yellow card) 67'	Report	Makos (yellow card) 40'; Berthé (yellow card) 51'	Stadium: Olympic Stadium; Attendance: 14,799; Referee: Giorgos Kasnaferis (Argolida)

6 January 2007 16	PAOK	2–0	AEK Athens	Thessaloniki
19:00 EET (UTC+2)	Charalambous (yellow card) 29'; Zagorakis (yellow card) 62'; Arabatzis 65'; Charalambidis 73'	Report	Tziortziopoulos (yellow card) 86'; Cirillo (yellow card) 90+3'	Stadium: Toumba Stadium; Attendance: 15,686; Referee: Giannis Tsachilidis (Piraeus)

14 January 2007 17	AEK Athens	3–1	OFI	Marousi
16:45 EET (UTC+2)	Tőzsér 31'; César (yellow card) 48'; Pliatsikas (yellow card) 63'; Wellington 75' (o.g.); Kampantais (yellow card) 77', (goal) 90'	Report	Drulić 18'; Ofori-Quaye (yellow card) 37'; Wellington (yellow card) 64'; Issa (yellow card) 77'	Stadium: Olympic Stadium; Attendance: 16,335; Referee: Michalis Germanakos (Athens)

21 January 2007 18	AEK Athens	3–0	Atromitos	Marousi
16:45 EET (UTC+2)	César (yellow card) 7', (goal) 80'; Liberopoulos 12', (yellow card) 43'; Pautasso (yellow card) 15'; Dellas (yellow card) 40'; Kone 90'	Report	Lima (yellow card) 11'; Rovas (yellow card) 42'; Katemis (yellow card) 43'; Ioannou (yellow card) 65'; Raguel (yellow card) 71'	Stadium: Olympic Stadium; Attendance: 16,335; Referee: Michalis Germanakos (Athens)

28 January 2007 19	Iraklis	1–1	AEK Athens	Thessaloniki
19:00 EET (UTC+2)	Aliuță (yellow card) 29'; Chloros (yellow card) 33'; Poursanidis (yellow card) 36'; Herrera 71'	Report	Emerson (yellow card) 29'; Liberopoulos 44'; Moras (yellow card) 56'	Stadium: Kaftanzoglio Stadium; Attendance: 4,105; Referee: Anastasios Kakos (Corfu)

4 February 2007 20	AEK Athens	3–3	Olympiacos	Marousi
19:00 EET (UTC+2)	Kampantais (yellow card) 11', (goal) 71'; Liberopoulos (yellow card) 21'; Nikopolidis 28' (o.g.); Konstantinou 48' (o.g.); Cirillo (yellow card) 90+3'	Report	Żewłakow (yellow card) 11' (yellow-red card) 56'; Nikopolidis (yellow card) 21'; Đorđević 45'; Rivaldo 45+2'; Torosidis (yellow card) 50'; César 62'	Stadium: Olympic Stadium; Attendance: 36,122; Referee: Thanasis Briakos (Epirus)

10 February 2007 21	Ergotelis	0–0	AEK Athens	Heraklion
16:45 EET (UTC+2)	Zapropoulos (yellow card) 48'; Tasić (yellow card) 58'; Júnior (yellow card) 87'; Fragoulakis (yellow card) 88'	Report	Cirillo (yellow card) 7'; Pliatsikas (yellow card) 64'; Tőzsér (yellow card) 90+3'	Stadium: Pankritio Stadium; Attendance: 5,217; Referee: Kyros Vassaras (Thessaloniki)

18 February 2007 22	AEK Athens	1–4	Panathinaikos	Marousi
19:00 EET (UTC+2)	Sorrentino (yellow card) 28'; Liberopoulos (yellow card) 52'; Kampantais (yellow card) 52'; César (yellow card) 54'; Kapetanos 89'	Report	Goumas 3'; Ninis 8'; Salpingidis 24'; Ivanschitz (yellow card) 32', (goal) 66'; Bóvio (yellow card) 44'	Stadium: Olympic Stadium; Attendance: 19,810; Referee: Vasilis Terovitsas (Aetoloacarnania)

25 February 2007 23	Apollon Kalamarias	1–2	AEK Athens	Thessaloniki
21:00 EET (UTC+2)	Sylla (yellow card) 11'; Wellington (yellow card) 12'; Bushi 17'; Karaliopoulos (yellow card) 54'; Fytanidis (yellow card) 58'	Report	Fytanidis 14' (o.g.); Moras (yellow card) 41'; Zikos (yellow card) 54'; César 58'; Manduca (yellow card) 85'	Stadium: Kalamaria Stadium; Attendance: 1,080; Referee: Giannis Tsachilidis (Piraeus)

3 March 2007 24	AEK Athens	3–1	Aris	Marousi
19:00 EET (UTC+2)	Papastathopoulos (yellow card) 29'; Manduca (yellow card) 44', (goal) 57' (pen.); Liberopoulos 74', (penalty missed) 78'; Kapetanos 89'	Report	Vangjeli (yellow card) 47'; Kouloucheris (yellow card) 56'; Papadopoulos (yellow card) 67' (yellow-red card) 76'; Belém 87'	Stadium: Olympic Stadium; Attendance: 14,688; Referee: Giorgos Daloukas (Thessaly)

11 March 2007 25	AEL	0–1	AEK Athens	Larissa
16:45 EET (UTC+2)	Antchouet (yellow card) 54'; Vallas (yellow card) 65'	Report	Ivić 13', (yellow card) 76'; Papastathopoulos (yellow card) 38'; Zikos (yellow card) 63'; Cirillo (yellow card) 74'	Stadium: Alkazar Stadium; Attendance: 8,210; Referee: Dimitris Kalopoulos (Thessaloniki)

18 March 2007 26	Kerkyra	0–1	AEK Athens	Corfu
16:45 EET (UTC+2)	Toskas (yellow card) 8'; Skoufalis (yellow card) 60'	Report	Kapetanos 1'; César (yellow card) 77'; Cirillo (yellow card) 86'	Stadium: Kerkyra Stadium; Attendance: 2,100; Referee: Christoforos Zografos (Athens)

15 April 2007 27	AEK Athens	5–2	Egaleo	Marousi
19:00 EEST (UTC+3)	Dellas (yellow card) 16'; Papastathopoulos (yellow card) 35'; Liberopoulos 43', 49', 53' (pen.); Kampantais 61', (yellow card) 88'; Ivić 66'; Zikos (yellow card) 84'	Report	Edusei 17'; Omo (yellow card) 39'; Tsatsos (yellow card) 45+2'; Kumordzi 85'	Stadium: Olympic Stadium; Attendance: 14,431; Referee: Konstantinos Papastamatis (Athens)

22 April 2007 28	Ionikos	1–5	AEK Athens	Piraeus
19:00 EEST (UTC+3)	Onwuachi 34'; Fabinho (yellow card) 38'	Report	Kafes 22'; Liberopoulos (yellow card) 50', (goal) 74', 90+3'; Cirillo (yellow card) 55'; Kampantais 62', 90'	Stadium: Neapolis Public Stadium; Attendance: 1,184; Referee: Kostas Zanetidis (Dodecanese)

29 April 2007 29	AEK Athens	0–0	Skoda Xanthi	Marousi
19:00 EEST (UTC+3)	Sorrentino (yellow card) 39'	Report	Kazakis (yellow card) 39'; Garpozis (yellow card) 66'	Stadium: Olympic Stadium; Attendance: 15,691; Referee: Giorgos Kasnaferis (Argolida)

13 May 2007 30	Panionios	3–1	AEK Athens	Nea Smyrni
19:00 EEST (UTC+3)	Lourenço 7'; Djebbour 69'; Nsaliwa 70'; Kondé (yellow card) 76'	Report	Tőzsér (yellow card) 20'; Pliatsikas (yellow card) 33'; Manduca 44'; Liberopoulos (yellow card) 86'	Stadium: Nea Smyrni Stadium; Attendance: 4,686; Referee: Dimitris Kalopoulos (Thessaloniki)

=== Greek Cup ===
9 November 2006 Round of 32	Chaidari	0–0 (a.e.t.) (5–4 p)	AEK Athens	Egaleo
19:00 EET (UTC+2)	Tournas (yellow card) 27' (yellow-red card) 94'; Lampropoulos (yellow card) 84' (yellow-red card) 101'	Report	Kapetanos (yellow card) 45'; Papastathopoulos (yellow card) 108'; Kyriakidis (red card) 118'	Stadium: Stavros Mavrothalassitis Stadium; Attendance: 2,000; Referee: Kostas Zanetidis (Dodecanese)
	Penalties
	Chorianopoulos (penalty scored); Tsabouris (penalty scored); Tsirogiannis (penalty missed); Tsibonias (penalty scored); Yfantis (penalty scored); Kripintiris (penalty scored)		(penalty scored) Delibašić; (penalty scored) Júlio César; (penalty scored) Georgeas; (penalty missed) Sapanis; (penalty scored) Liberopoulos; (penalty missed) Moras

=== UEFA Champions League ===
==== Third qualifying round ====
The draw for the third qualifying round was held on 28 July 2006.

9 August 2006 First leg	Hearts (Scotland)	1–2	(Greece) AEK Athens	Edinburgh, Scotland
21:45 EEST (UTC+3)	Aguiar (yellow card) 28' (yellow-red card) 66'; Mikoliūnas 62'; McCann (yellow card) 76'	Report	Georgeas (yellow card) 13'; Kapetanos 89'; Liberopoulos 90+2'	Stadium: Murrayfield Stadium; Attendance: 40,000; Referee: Nikolai Vollquartz (Denmark)
Note: The official report states that the second goal of AEK Athens at the stoppage time was an own goal by Fyssas, but in the highlights of the game it appears clearly that it was a goal by Liberopoulos.

23 August 2006 Second leg	AEK Athens (Greece)	3–0 (5–1 agg.)	(Scotland) Hearts	Athens, Greece
21:45 EEST (UTC+3)	Liberopoulos (yellow card) 16', (goal) 81'; Georgeas (yellow card) 74'; César 78' (pen.), 85', (yellow card) 80'	Report	Neilson (yellow card) 6'; Brellier (yellow card) 26' (yellow-red card) 29'; Mikoliūnas (yellow card) 40'; Fyssas (yellow card) 58'; McCann (red card) 63'	Stadium: Olympic Stadium; Attendance: 42,925; Referee: Yuri Baskakov (Russia)

==== Group stage ====
The draw for the group stage was held on 24 August 2006.

Pos	Team	Pld	W	D	L	GF	GA	GD	Pts	Qualification	MIL	LIL	AEK	AND
1	(Italy) Milan	6	3	1	2	8	4	+4	10	Advance to knockout stage	—	0–2	3–0	4–1
2	(France) Lille	6	2	3	1	8	5	+3	9	Advance to knockout stage	0–0	—	3–1	2–2
3	(Greece) AEK Athens	6	2	2	2	6	9	−3	8	Transfer to UEFA Cup	1–0	1–0	—	1–1
4	(Belgium) Anderlecht	6	0	4	2	7	11	−4	4		0–1	1–1	2–2	—

Source: RSSSF

===== Matches =====
13 September 2006 1	Milan (Italy)	3–0	(Greece) AEK Athens	Milan, Italy
21:45 EEST (UTC+3)	Inzaghi 17'; Maldini (yellow card) 23'; Gourcuff 41'; Kaká 76'	Report	Cirillo (yellow card) 27'; Moras (yellow card) 64'	Stadium: San Siro; Attendance: 31,836; Referee: Mike Riley (England)

26 September 2006 2	AEK Athens (Greece)	1–1	(Belgium) Anderlecht	Athens, Greece
21:45 EEST (UTC+3)	César (yellow card) 2', (goal) 28'; Cirillo (yellow card) 62'	Report	Frutos 25'; Vanden Borre (yellow card) 31'; Goor (yellow card) 67'; Tchité (yellow card) 78'	Stadium: Olympic Stadium; Attendance: 38,982; Referee: Claus Bo Larsen (Denmark)

17 October 2006 3	Lille (France)	3–1	(Greece) AEK Athens	Lens, France
21:45 EEST (UTC+3)	Plestan (yellow card) 45+2'; Tavlaridis (yellow card) 47'; Robail (yellow card) 61', (goal) 65'; Keïta (yellow card) 73'; Gygax 82'; Makoun 90+1'	Report	Udeze (yellow card) 10'; Papastathopoulos (yellow card) 38'; César (yellow card) 42'; Liberopoulos (yellow card) 62'; Emerson (yellow card) 70'; Ivić 68'	Stadium: Stade Félix-Bollaert; Attendance: 32,000; Referee: Florian Meyer (Germany)

1 November 2006 4	AEK Athens (Greece)	1–0	(France) Lille	Athens, Greece
21:45 EET (UTC+2)	Dellas (yellow card) 37'; Kapetanos (yellow card) 71'; Liberopoulos 74'	Report	Tavlaridis (yellow card) 3' (yellow-red card) 22'; Makoun (yellow card) 36'; Keïta (yellow card) 45+2'; Cabaye (yellow card) 77'	Stadium: Olympic Stadium; Attendance: 31,148; Referee: Steve Bennett (England)

21 November 2006 5	AEK Athens (Greece)	1–0	(Italy) Milan	Athens, Greece
21:45 EET (UTC+2)	César 32'; Tziortziopoulos (yellow card) 34'; Tőzsér (yellow card) 58'	Report	Oliveira (yellow card) 45'; Seedorf (yellow card) 75'	Stadium: Olympic Stadium; Attendance: 56,203; Referee: Eric Braamhaar (Netherlands)

6 December 2006 6	Anderlecht (Belgium)	2–2	(Greece) AEK Athens	Brussels, Belgium
21:45 EET (UTC+2)	Vanden Borre 38'; Frutos 63'	Report	Lakis 75'; Cirillo 81'	Stadium: Constant Vanden Stock Stadium; Attendance: 28,000; Referee: Peter Fröjdfeldt (Sweden)

=== UEFA Cup ===
==== Round of 32 ====
14 February 2007 First leg	AEK Athens (Greece)	0–2	(France) Paris Saint-Germain	Athens, Greece
21:45 EET (UTC+2)		Report	Sakho (yellow card) 20'; Mendy (yellow card) 41', (goal) 88'; Traoré 45+1'	Stadium: Olympic Stadium; Attendance: 26,120; Referee: Craig Thomson (Scotland)

22 February 2007 Second leg	Paris Saint-Germain (France)	2–0 (4–0 agg.)	(Greece) AEK Athens	Paris, France
21:45 EET (UTC+2)	Frau 42'; Mendy 90+1' (pen.)	Report	Kyriakidis (yellow card) 20'; Kapetanos (yellow card) 45+1'	Stadium: Parc des Princes; Attendance: 20,000; Referee: Gianluca Paparesta (Italy)

== Statistics ==
=== Squad statistics ===
As of 13 May 2007

No.	Pos	Player	Super League		Greek Cup		Champions League		UEFA Cup		Total	
No.	Pos	Player	Apps	Goals	Apps	Goals	Apps	Goals	Apps	Goals	Apps	Goals
Goalkeepers
22	GK	(Greece) Dionysis Chiotis	5	0	1	0	1	0	0	0	7	0
28	GK	(Italy) Stefano Sorrentino	25	0	0	0	7	0	2	0	34	0
84	GK	(Greece) Giannis Arabatzis	0	0	0	0	0	0	0	0	0	0
—	GK	(Greece) Antonis Lykouris	0	0	0	0	0	0	0	0	0	0
Defenders
4	DF	(Greece) Vangelis Moras	15	0	1	0	4	0	2	0	22	0
5	DF	(Italy) Bruno Cirillo	26	0	0	0	8	1	2	0	36	1
6	DF	(Greece) Georgios Alexopoulos	0	0	0	0	0	0	0	0	0	0
13	DF	(Argentina) Martin Pautasso	15	1	0	0	4	0	0	0	19	1
14	DF	(Greece) Stavros Tziortziopoulos	15	1	0	0	3	0	2	0	20	1
15	DF	(Greece) Sokratis Papastathopoulos	14	0	1	0	3	0	1	0	19	0
31	DF	(Greece) Nikolaos Georgeas	12	0	1	0	6	0	1	0	20	0
55	DF	(Greece) Traianos Dellas	15	1	0	0	5	0	0	0	20	1
81	DF	(Greece) Nikolaos Kourkoulas	0	0	0	0	0	0	0	0	0	0
90	DF	(Greece) Savvas Gentsoglou	0	0	0	0	0	0	0	0	0	0
Midfielders
1	MF	(Greece) Pantelis Kafes	7	1	0	0	0	0	2	0	9	1
7	MF	(Greece) Ilias Kyriakidis	7	0	1	0	5	0	2	0	15	0
10	MF	(Greece) Panagiotis Kone	12	1	0	0	0	0	1	0	13	1
11	MF	(Brazil) Gustavo Manduca	23	5	0	0	3	0	2	0	28	5
16	MF	(Greece) Akis Zikos	19	0	0	0	4	0	1	0	24	0
17	MF	(Serbia) Vladan Ivić	12	2	0	0	4	1	1	0	17	3
19	MF	(Greece) Panagiotis Lagos	10	1	1	0	4	0	0	0	15	1
20	MF	(Greece) Vasilios Pliatsikas	12	0	1	0	0	0	1	0	14	0
23	MF	(Greece) Vasilios Lakis	21	2	1	0	5	1	1	0	28	3
25	MF	(Brazil) Emerson	17	0	0	0	6	0	0	0	23	0
56	MF	(Finland) Përparim Hetemaj	7	0	1	0	4	0	0	0	12	0
88	MF	(Hungary) Dániel Tőzsér	23	2	0	0	8	0	2	0	33	2
92	MF	(Greece) Giorgos Paligeorgos	1	0	0	0	0	0	0	0	1	0
Forwards
33	FW	(Greece) Nikos Liberopoulos	29	18	1	0	8	3	1	0	39	21
35	FW	(Greece) Pantelis Kapetanos	15	3	1	0	5	1	2	0	23	4
79	FW	(Greece) Leonidas Kampantais	21	8	0	0	1	0	0	0	22	8
83	FW	(Greece) Michalis Pavlis	0	0	0	0	0	0	0	0	0	0
99	FW	(Brazil) Júlio César	28	9	1	0	8	4	2	0	39	13
Left during Winter Transfer Window
24	DF	(Nigeria) Ifeanyi Udeze	3	0	0	0	2	0	0	0	5	0
—	DF	(Greece) Panagiotis Stergiatos	0	0	0	0	0	0	0	0	0	0
—	DF	(Greece) Vasilios Vallianos	0	0	0	0	0	0	0	0	0	0
8	MF	(Greece) Miltiadis Sapanis	0	0	1	0	0	0	0	0	1	0
—	MF	(Greece) Nikolaos Kaltsas	0	0	0	0	0	0	0	0	0	0
9	FW	(Montenegro) Andrija Delibašić	10	1	1	0	4	0	0	0	15	1

=== Goalscorers ===
As of 13 May 2007
The list is sorted by competition order when total goals are equal, then by position and then by squad number.

Rank	No.	Pos.	Player	Super League	Greek Cup	Champions League	UEFA Cup	Total
1	33	FW	(Greece) Nikos Liberopoulos	18	0	3	0	21
2	99	FW	(Brazil) Júlio César	9	0	4	0	13
3	79	FW	(Greece) Leonidas Kampantais	8	0	0	0	8
4	11	MF	(Brazil) Gustavo Manduca	5	0	0	0	5
5	35	FW	(Greece) Pantelis Kapetanos	3	0	1	0	4
6	23	MF	(Greece) Vasilios Lakis	2	0	1	0	3
6	17	MF	(Serbia) Vladan Ivić	2	0	1	0	3
8	88	MF	(Hungary) Dániel Tőzsér	2	0	0	0	2
9	55	DF	(Greece) Traianos Dellas	1	0	0	0	1
9	13	DF	(Argentina) Martin Pautasso	1	0	0	0	1
9	14	DF	(Greece) Stavros Tziortziopoulos	1	0	0	0	1
9	1	MF	(Greece) Pantelis Kafes	1	0	0	0	1
9	19	MF	(Greece) Panagiotis Lagos	1	0	0	0	1
9	22	MF	(Greece) Panagiotis Kone	1	0	0	0	1
9	9	FW	(Montenegro) Andrija Delibašić	1	0	0	0	1
9	5	DF	(Italy) Bruno Cirillo	0	0	1	0	1
Own goals				4	0	0	0	4
Totals				60	0	11	0	71

=== Hat-tricks ===
Numbers in superscript represent the goals that the player scored.

Player	Against	Result	Date	Competition	Source
(Greece) Nikos Liberopoulos	(Greece) Panionios	4–0 (H)	17 December 2006	Super League	
(Greece) Nikos Liberopoulos	(Greece) Egaleo	5–2 (H)	15 April 2007	Super League	

=== Assists ===
As of 13 May 2007
The list is sorted by competition order when total assists are equal, then by position and then by squad number.

Rank	No.	Pos.	Player	Super League	Greek Cup	Champions League	UEFA Cup	Total
1	99	FW	(Brazil) Júlio César	10	0	0	0	10
2	33	FW	(Greece) Nikos Liberopoulos	6	0	2	0	8
3	23	MF	(Greece) Vasilios Lakis	6	0	0	0	6
3	88	MF	(Hungary) Dániel Tőzsér	6	0	0	0	6
5	11	MF	(Brazil) Gustavo Manduca	5	0	1	0	5
6	79	FW	(Greece) Leonidas Kampantais	4	0	0	0	4
7	5	DF	(Italy) Bruno Cirillo	2	0	0	0	2
7	35	FW	(Greece) Pantelis Kapetanos	2	0	0	0	2
9	55	DF	(Greece) Traianos Dellas	1	0	0	0	1
9	17	MF	(Serbia) Vladan Ivić	1	0	0	0	1
9	19	MF	(Greece) Panagiotis Lagos	1	0	0	0	1
9	9	FW	(Montenegro) Andrija Delibašić	1	0	0	0	1
9	31	DF	(Greece) Nikolaos Georgeas	0	0	1	0	1
9	56	MF	(Finland) Përparim Hetemaj	0	0	1	0	1
Totals				45	0	5	0	50

=== Clean sheets ===
As of 13 May 2007
The list is sorted by competition order when total clean sheets are equal and then by squad number. Clean sheets in games where both goalkeepers participated are awarded to the goalkeeper who started the game. Goalkeepers with no appearances are not included.

Rank	No.	Player	Super League	Greek Cup	Champions League	UEFA Cup	Total
1	28	(Italy) Stefano Sorrentino	10	0	2	0	12
2	22	(Greece) Dionysis Chiotis	2	1	1	0	4
Totals			12	1	3	0	16

=== Disciplinary record ===
As of 13 May 2007

N	P	Nat.	Name	Super League			Greek Cup			Champions League			UEFA Cup			Total			Notes
N	P	Nat.	Name	Yellow card	Second yellow card	Red card	Yellow card	Second yellow card	Red card	Yellow card	Second yellow card	Red card	Yellow card	Second yellow card	Red card	Yellow card	Second yellow card	Red card	Notes
Goalkeepers
22	GK	(Greece)	Dionysis Chiotis	1												1			
28	GK	(Italy)	Stefano Sorrentino	4												4			
84	GK	(Greece)	Giannis Arabatzis																
—	GK	(Greece)	Antonis Lykouris																
Defenders
4	DF	(Greece)	Vangelis Moras	2						1						3			
5	DF	(Italy)	Bruno Cirillo	8		1				2						10		1	
6	DF	(Greece)	Georgios Alexopoulos																
13	DF	(Argentina)	Martin Pautasso	1												1			
14	DF	(Greece)	Stavros Tziortziopoulos	3						1						4			
15	DF	(Greece)	Sokratis Papastathopoulos	4			1			1						6			
31	DF	(Greece)	Nikolaos Georgeas	1						2						3			
55	DF	(Greece)	Traianos Dellas	3						1						4			
81	DF	(Greece)	Nikolaos Kourkoulas																
90	DF	(Greece)	Savvas Gentsoglou																
Midfielders
1	MF	(Greece)	Pantelis Kafes																
7	MF	(Greece)	Ilias Kyriakidis	1					1				1			2		1	
10	MF	(Greece)	Panagiotis Kone	1												1			
11	MF	(Brazil)	Gustavo Manduca	3												3			
16	MF	(Greece)	Akis Zikos	7												7			
17	MF	(Serbia)	Vladan Ivić	2												2			
19	MF	(Greece)	Panagiotis Lagos																
20	MF	(Greece)	Vasilios Pliatsikas	4												4			
23	MF	(Greece)	Vasilios Lakis	1												1			
25	MF	(Brazil)	Emerson	3						1						4			
56	MF	(Finland)	Përparim Hetemaj	1												1			
88	MF	(Hungary)	Dániel Tőzsér	4						1						5			
92	MF	(Greece)	Giorgos Paligeorgos																
Forwards
33	FW	(Greece)	Nikos Liberopoulos	7						2						9			
35	FW	(Greece)	Pantelis Kapetanos	1			1			2			1			5			
79	FW	(Greece)	Leonidas Kampantais	6	1											6	1		
83	FW	(Greece)	Michalis Pavlis																
99	FW	(Brazil)	Júlio César	6						3						9			
Left during Winter Transfer window
24	DF	(Nigeria)	Ifeanyi Udeze	2						1						3			
—	DF	(Greece)	Panagiotis Stergiatos																
—	DF	(Greece)	Vasilios Vallianos																
8	MF	(Greece)	Miltiadis Sapanis																
—	MF	(Greece)	Nikolaos Kaltsas																
9	FW	(Montenegro)	Andrija Delibašić	1												1			

=== Starting 11 ===
This section presents the most frequently used formation along with the players with the most starts across all competitions.

N.	Formation	Matchday(s)
35	4–4–2	1–6, 8–30
3	4–4–2 (D)
2	4–2–3–1
1	4–3–3	7

No.	Nat.	Player	Pos.
28	(Italy)	Stefano Sorrentino	GK
5	(Italy)	Bruno Cirillo	RCB
55	(Greece)	Traianos Dellas (C)	LCB
88	(Hungary)	Dániel Tőzsér	RB
14	(Greece)	Stavros Tziortziopoulos	LB
16	(Greece)	Akis Zikos	RDM
25	(Brazil)	Emerson	LDM
11	(Brazil)	Gustavo Manduca	RM
99	(Brazil)	Júlio César	LM
79	(Greece)	Leonidas Kampantais	RCF
33	(Greece)	Nikos Liberopoulos	LCF

Last updated: 2007-05-13

=== UEFA rankings ===
UEFA team ranking

#	Form	Previous	Country	Team	Ranking
67		66	(France)	Sochaux	36.706
68		99	(England)	Blackburn Rovers	36.618
69		57	(Greece)	AEK Athens	36.415
70		79	(Netherlands)	Heerenveen	35.995
71		77	(Germany)	Hamburger SV	34.640
—		29	(Germany)	Borussia Dortmund	34.640

UEFA country ranking

#	Form	Previous	Country	League	Ranking
13		14	(Czech Republic)	1. Gambrinus Liga	26.825
14		15	(Turkey)	Turkcell Süper Lig	26.641
15		8	(Greece)	Super League Greece	25.497
16		17	(Bulgaria)	A PFG	24.582
17		16	(Switzerland)	Axpo Super League	23.850

== Awards ==
Player	Pos.	Award	Source
(Greece) Nikos Liberopoulos	FW	Super League Top Scorer	
(Greece) Nikos Liberopoulos	FW	Greek Player of the Season	
