= 2013–14 Greek Football Cup =

2013–14 Greek Cup

Tournament details
- Country: Greece
- Teams: 46

Final positions
- Champions: Panathinaikos (18th title)
- Runners-up: PAOK

Tournament statistics
- Matches played: 74
- Goals scored: 142 (1.92 per match)
- Top goal scorer(s): Marcus Berg (7 goals)

The 2013–14 Greek Football Cup was the 72nd edition of the Greek Football Cup. A total of 46 clubs, 16 less than last edition, were accepted to enter. The competition commenced on 14 September 2013 with the first round and concluded on 26 April 2014 with the final at the Olympic Stadium between Panathinaikos and PAOK, with Panathinaikos winning 4–1.

== Teams ==
Round	Clubs remaining	Clubs involved	Winners from previous round	New entries	Leagues entering
First Round	46	28	none	28	Football League
Round of 32	32	32	14	18	Super League
Round of 16	16	16	16	none	none
Quarter-Finals	8	8	8	none	none
Semi-Finals	4	4	4	none	none
Final	2	2	2	none	none

== Calendar ==
Round	Date(s)	Fixtures	Clubs	New entries
First Round	14, 15, 18 September 2013	13	46 → 32	28
Round of 32	25, 26 September & 30, 31 October 2013	32	32 → 16	18
Round of 16	4, 5 December 2013, 8, 9 & 15, 16, 22, 23 January 2014	16	16 → 8	none
Quarter-finals	29, 30 January & 12, 13 February 2014	8	8 → 4	none
Semi-finals	19, 20 March & 16, 17 April 2014	4	4 → 2	none
Final	26 April 2014	1	2 → 1	none

== Participating clubs ==
The following 46 teams competed in First Round:

2013–14 Super League	2013–14 Football League
AEL Kalloni; Apollon Smyrnis; Aris; Asteras Tripolis; Atromitos; Ergotelis; Levadiakos; OFI; Olympiacos; Panathinaikos; Panetolikos; Panionios; Panthrakikos; PAOK; PAS Giannina; Platanias; Skoda Xanthi; Veria	Acharnaikos; Aiginiakos; Anagennisi Giannitsa; Anagennisi Karditsa; Apollon Kalamarias; Asteras Magoula; Chania; Doxa Drama; Episkopi; Ethnikos Gazoros; Fokikos; Fostiras; Glyfada; Iraklis Psachna; Iraklis; Kallithea; Kavala; Kerkyra; Niki Volos; Olympiacos Volos; Panachaiki; Panegialios; Paniliakos; Pierikos; Tyrnavos; Vataniakos; Vyzas; Zakynthos

== Knockout phase ==
Each tie in the knockout phase, apart from the first two rounds and the final, was played over two legs, with each team playing one leg at home. The team that scored more goals on aggregate over the two legs advanced to the next round. If the aggregate score was level, the away goals rule was applied, i.e. the team that scored more goals away from home over the two legs advanced. If away goals were also equal, then extra time was played. The away goals rule was again applied after extra time, i.e. if there were goals scored during extra time and the aggregate score was still level, the visiting team advanced by virtue of more away goals scored. If no goals were scored during extra time, the winners were decided by a penalty shoot-out. In the first two rounds and the final, which were played as a single match, if the score was level at the end of normal time, extra time was played, followed by a penalty shoot-out if the score was still level.
The mechanism of the draws for each round is as follows:

- In the draw for the Round of 32, the teams from the first division are seeded and the winners from the first round were unseeded. The seeded teams are drawn against the unseeded teams with the exception of one draw.
- In the draws for the Round of 16 onwards, there are no seedings and teams from the different group can be drawn against each other.

== First round ==
The draw for this round took place on 10 September 2013.

=== Summary ===
Team 1	Score	Team 2
Fokikos	2–1 (a.e.t.)	Acharnaikos
Olympiacos Volos	2–0	Panachaiki
Glyfada	0–1	Kallithea
Vyzas Megara	1–2	Chania
Paniliakos	1–2	Fostiras
Iraklis Psachna	2–1 (a.e.t.)	Panegialios
Asteras Magoula	2–1	Episkopi
Kerkyra	2–2 (6–5 p)	Doxa Drama
Tyrnavos	1–1 (3–4 p)	Iraklis
Anagennisi Giannitsa	2–3 (a.e.t.)	Aiginiakos
Ethnikos Gazoros	1–2	Niki Volos
Apollon Kalamarias	3–0 (w/o)	Zakynthos
Anagennisi Karditsa	3–2	Kavala
Pierikos	3–0	Vataniakos

=== Matches ===
15 September 2013
16:00 EEST

Fokikos	2–1 (a.e.t.)	Acharnaikos
Skaribas 73' (pen.); Tzekos 114'	Report	Ogunsoto 9'

Itea Municipal Stadium
Referee: Angelos Evangelou (Athens)

14 September 2013
19:00 EEST

Olympiacos Volos	2–0	Panachaiki
Gurma 8'; Katsikis 88'	Report

Volos Municipal Stadium, Volos
Referee: Fotis Fotiadis (Kastoria)

15 September 2013
18:30 EEST

Glyfada	0–1	Kallithea
	Report	Galan 56'

Michalis Kritikopoulos Stadium, Kesariani
Referee: Giannis Mourtzakis (Heraklion)

15 September 2013
16:00 EEST

Vyzas Megara	1–2	Chania
Stamogiannos 50'	Report	Manolas 28'; Tsatsos 53'

Megara National Stadium, Megara
Referee: Christos Andronikidis (Piraeus)

18 September 2013
16:00 EEST

Paniliakos	1–2	Fostiras
Kalaitzidis 64'	Report	Vouzas 20'; Rodríguez 79' (o.g.)

Pyrgos Municipal Stadium, Elis
Referee: Aristidis Vatsios (West Attica)

14 September 2013
16:30 EEST

Iraklis Psachna	2–1 (a.e.t.)	Panegialios
Chimodzi 34'; Bakomitros 116'	Report	Goumas 73'

Psachna Municipal Stadium, Euboea
Referee: Nikos Papageorgiou (Athens)

15 September 2013
16:00 EEST

Asteras Magoula	2–1	Episkopi
Kapouranis 67'; Martínez 74'	Report	González 83' (pen.)

Eleusis Municipal Stadium, Eleusis
Referee: Simeon Kosikidis (Athens)

18 September 2013
16:00 EEST

Kerkyra	2–2 (a.e.t.)	Doxa Drama
Zorbas 24'; Venetis 105'	Report	Stoikos 22', 113' (pen.)
Penalties
Souanis (penalty scored); Karademitros (penalty scored); Kontos (penalty scored); Gomes (penalty scored); Gyftokostas (penalty scored); Andreopoulos (penalty scored)	6–5	(penalty scored) Stoikos; (penalty scored) Boutzikos; (penalty scored) Kikov; (penalty scored) Beka; (penalty scored) Amanatidis; (penalty missed) Routsis

Kerkyra Stadium, Corfu
Referee: Vassilis Panagiotopoulos (Aetolioacarnania)

15 September 2013
16:00 EEST

Tyrnavos	1–1 (a.e.t.)	Iraklis
Kourtesiotis 44' (pen.)	Report	Tsilianidis 90+6'
Penalties
Rodrigo (penalty scored); André (penalty missed); Galitsios (penalty scored); Skoupras (penalty scored); Kourtesiotis (penalty missed)	3–4	(penalty scored) Pourtoulidis; (penalty scored) Boukouvalas; (penalty scored) Huanderson; (penalty scored) Lima

Alcazar Stadium, Larissa
Referee: Vangelis Gratsanis (Trikala)

15 September 2013
16:00 EEST

Anagennisi Giannitsa	2–3 (a.e.t.)	Aiginiakos
Moschakis 7'; Jankulica 78'	Report	Milošković 8'; Karakatsanis 69'; Zourkos 115'

Neos Mylotopos Ground, Neos Mylotopos
Referee: Angelos Angelakis (Macedonia)

15 September 2013
16:00 EEST

Ethnikos Gazoros	1–2	Niki Volos
Gaidartzis 81'	Report	Isaac 23'; Tzioras 60'

Serres Municipal Stadium, Serres
Referee: Alexandros Katsikogiannis (Epirus)

14 September 2013
16:30 EEST

Apollon Kalamarias	3–0 (Awarded)	Zakynthos
	Report

Kalamaria Stadium, Thessaloniki

15 September 2013
16:00 EEST

Anagennisi Karditsa	3–2	Kavala
Bousinakis 27'; Chloros 37'; Chatzirizos 84'	Report	Kapnidis 48'; Alexiou 51'

Karditsa Municipal Stadium, Karditsa
Referee: Kostas Kariofillis (Piraeus)

15 September 2013
16:00 EEST

Pierikos	3–0	Vataniakos
Apostolidis 10'; Iordanidis 60'; Katharios 65'	Report

Katerini Municipal Stadium, Katerini
Referee: Thanasis Tzilos (Larissa)

== Bracket ==
Round of 32
Olympiacos	5	5	10
Fokikos	1	3	4
Asteras Tripolis	0	1	1
Chania	0	0	0
Kerkyra	0	0	0
Panetolikos	1	1	2
Fostiras	0	0	0
Atromitos	1	7	8
Iraklis	1	2	3
Skoda Xanthi	0	2	2
PAOK	3	1	4
Anagennisi Karditsa	0	0	0
Platanias	1	1	2
Apollon Smyrnis	1	2	3
Niki Volos (p)	2	1	3(4)
Panthrakikos	1	2	3(1)
Kallithea	0	1	1
OFI	1	1	2
Pierikos	1	2	3
AEL Kalloni	2	2	4
PAS Giannina	0	0	0
Aiginiakos	0	1	1
Panionios	3	0	3
Apollon Kalamarias	1	0	1
Panathinaikos	2	1	3
Ergotelis	1	0	1
Iraklis Psachna	3	1	4
Veria	1	2	3
Olympiacos Volos	1	0	1
Aris	0	0	0
Asteras Magoula (a)	2	2	4
Levadiakos	1	3	4

Round of 16
Olympiacos	4	1	5
Asteras Tripolis	0	0	0
Panetolikos	0	0	0
Atromitos	2	2	4
Iraklis	0	1	1
PAOK	1	5	6
Apollon Smyrnis	3	0	3
Niki Volos	1	1	2
OFI	0	2	2
AEL Kalloni	1	0	1
Aiginiakos	1	0	1
Panionios	0	3	3
Panathinaikos	3	1	4
Iraklis Psachna	0	0	0
Olympiacos Volos	2	2	4
Asteras Magoula	0	1	1

Quarter-finals
Olympiacos (a)	0	1	1
Atromitos	0	1	1
PAOK	3	3	6
Apollon Smyrnis	0	0	0
OFI	2	2	4
Panionios	0	1	1
Panathinaikos	4	0	4
Olympiacos Volos	0	1	1

Semi-finals
Olympiacos	2	0	2
PAOK (a)	1	1	2
OFI	1	0	1
Panathinaikos	0	3	3

Final
PAOK	1
Panathinaikos	4

== Round of 32 ==
The draw for this round took place on 10 September 2013, after the First Round draw.

=== Summary ===
Team 1	Agg.	Team 2	1st leg	2nd leg
PAOK	4–0	Anagennisi Karditsa	3–0	1–0
Panathinaikos	3–1	Ergotelis	2–1	1–0
Olympiacos	10–4	Fokikos	5–1	5–3
Asteras Tripolis	1–0	Chania	0–0	1–0
Niki Volos	2–2 (4–1 p)	Panthrakikos	2–1	1–2
Kallithea	1–2	OFI	0–1	1–1
Iraklis	3–2	Skoda Xanthi	1–0	2–2
Olympiacos Volos	1–0	Aris	1–0	0–0
Asteras Magoula	(a) 4–4	Levadiakos	2–1	2–3
Iraklis Psachna	4–3	Veria	3–1	1–2
Fostiras	0–8	Atromitos	0–1	0–7
Platanias	2–3	Apollon Smyrnis	1–1	1–2
PAS Giannina	0–1	Aiginiakos	0–0	0–1
Panionios	3–1	Apollon Kalamarias	3–1	0–0
Kerkyra	0–2	Panetolikos	0–1	0–1
Pierikos	3–4	AEL Kalloni	1–2	2–2

=== Matches ===
26 September 2013
20:30 EEST

PAOK	3–0	Anagennisi Karditsa
Georgiadis 45+1'; Vukić 75'; Necid 82'	Report

Toumba Stadium, Thessaloniki
Attendance: 9,452
Referee: Giannis Topouzis (Thrace)
30 October 2013
20:30 EET

Anagennisi Karditsa	0–1	PAOK
	Report	Oliseh 67'

Karditsa Municipal Stadium, Karditsa
Referee: Alexandros Katsikogiannis (Epirus)

PAOK won 4–0 on aggregate.

25 September 2013
20:30 EEST

Panathinaikos	2–1	Ergotelis
Klonaridis 41'; Schildenfeld 90'	Report	Diamantakos 59'

Leoforos Alexandras Stadium, Ampelokipoi
Referee: Giorgos Liachoudis (Macedonia)
30 October 2013
18:00 EET

Ergotelis	0–1	Panathinaikos
	Report	Berg 49'

Pankritio Stadium, Heraklion
Referee: Giorgos Kominis (Thesprotia)

Panathinaikos won 3–1 on aggregate.

25 September 2013
18:00 EEST

Olympiacos	5–1	Fokikos
Campbell 4'; Yatabaré 8'; Šćepović 52', 81'; Olaitan 63'	Report	Frangos 56'

Karaiskakis Stadium, Piraeus
Referee: Aristeidis Vatsios (West Attica)
30 October 2013
20:30 EET

Fokikos	3–5	Olympiacos
Frangos 9'; Randy 51'; Álvarez 76'	Report	Fuster 16'; Weiss 23'; Olaitan 25'; N'Dinga 33'; Papasavvas 86'

Amfissa Municipal Stadium, Amfissa
Referee: Anastasios Papapetrou (Athens)

Olympiacos won 10–4 on aggregate.

25 September 2013
18:00 EEST

Asteras Tripolis	0–0	Chania
	Report

Theodoros Kolokotronis Stadium, Tripoli
Referee: Angelos Evangelou (Athens)
31 October 2013
15:30 EET

Chania	0–1	Asteras Tripolis
	Report	De Blasis 79'

Perivolia Municipal Stadium, Chania
Referee: Praxitelis Zachariadis (Macedonia)

Asteras Tripolis won 1–0 on aggregate.

25 September 2013
15:30 EEST

Niki Volos	2–1	Panthrakikos
Isaac 40', 52'	Report	Romeu 12'

Panthessaliko Stadium, Volos
Referee: Giannis Papadopoulos (Macedonia)
30 October 2013
15:30 EET

Panthrakikos	2–1 (a.e.t.)	Niki Volos
Tzanis 16'; Igor 32'	Report	Añete 80'
Penalties
Popović (penalty missed); Papageorgiou (penalty scored); Igor (penalty missed)	1–4	(penalty scored) Añete; (penalty scored) Manousakis; (penalty scored) Rivera; (penalty scored) Papadopoulos

Komotini Municipal Stadium, Komotini
Referee: Giorgos Kyzas (Drama)

Niki Volos won 4–1 on penalties.

26 September 2013
15:30 EEST

Kallithea	0–1	OFI
	Report	Zoro 90+4'

Grigoris Lambrakis Stadium, Kallithea
Referee: Nikos Anousos (Laconia)
31 October 2013
18:00 EET

OFI	1–1	Kallithea
Papazoglou 9'	Report	Faye 90'

Theodoros Vardinogiannis Stadium, Heraklion
Referee: Giorgos Giannoulakis (Chania)

OFI won 2–1 on aggregate.

26 September 2013
15:30 EEST

Iraklis	1–0	Skoda Xanthi
Zahora 86'	Report

Kaftanzoglio Stadium, Thessaloniki
Referee: Stavros Mantalos (Athens)
31 October 2013
18:00 EET

Skoda Xanthi	2–2	Iraklis
Mandalos 30', 32'	Report	Siatravanis 78'; Pourtoulidis 90'

Skoda Xanthi Arena, Xanthi
Attendance: Giannis Delfakis (Arcadia)

Skoda Xanthi won 3–2 on aggregate.

26 September 2013
18:00 EEST

Olympiacos Volos	1–0	Aris
Katsikis 74'	Report

Volos Municipal Stadium, Volos
Referee: Alexandros Aretopoulos (Trikala)
31 October 2013
20:30 EET

Aris	0–0	Olympiacos Volos
	Report

Kleanthis Vikelidis Stadium, Thessaloniki
Referee: Anastasios Sidiropoulos (Dodecanese)

Olympiacos Volos won 1–0 on aggregate.

25 September 2013
15:30 EEST

Asteras Magoula	2–1	Levadiakos
Everet 2'; Almir 48' (pen.)	Report	Martínez 67'

Eleusis Municipal Stadium, Eleusis
Referee: Giannis Kabaxis (Euboea)
30 October 2013
15:30 EET

Levadiakos	3–2	Asteras Magoula
Armiche 27'; Rogério 47'; Busto 86'	Report	Nonis 83'; Kasmeridis 90+3'

Levadia Municipal Stadium, Levadia
Referee: Marios Lambropoulos (Elis)

Asteras Magoula won on away goals.

25 September 2013
15:30 EEST

Iraklis Psachna	3–1	Veria
Kritikos 37' (pen.), 54'; Kiliaras 84'	Report	Manos 72'

Psachna Municipal Stadium, Euboea
Referee: Charalambos Kalogeropoulos (Athens)
31 October 2013
15:30 EET

Veria	2–1	Iraklis Psachna
Mrdaković 13'; Kaltsas 87'	Report	Nikolopoulos 33'

Veria Stadium, Veria
Referee: Alexandros Aretopoulos (Trikala)

Iraklis Psachna won 4–3 on aggregate.

26 September 2013
18:00 EEST

Fostiras	0–1	Atromitos
	Report	Karamanos 77'

Tavros Stadium, Tavros
Referee: Spyros Selimos (Laconia)
31 October 2013
20:30 EET

Atromitos	7–0	Fostiras
Georgiou 6'; Karamanos 17', 30'; Kargas 34' (o.g.); Iglesias 41'; Karagounis 63'; Tavlaridis 70'	Report

Peristeri Stadium, Peristeri
Referee: Alexandros Dimitropoulos (Phthiotis)

Atromitos won 8–0 on aggregate.

26 September 2013
20:30 EEST

Platanias	1–1	Apollon Smyrnis
Torres 41'	Report	Panteliadis 45+2'

Perivolia Municipal Stadium, Chania
Referee: Kostas Ioannidis (Argolida)
30 October 2013
18:00 EET

Apollon Smyrnis	2–1	Platanias
Mingas 50'; Tsiliggiris 69'	Report	Rafael 85'

Georgios Kamaras Stadium, Rizoupoli
Referee: Dimitris Styliaras (Aetolioacarnania)

Apollon Smyrnis won 3–2 on aggregate.

25 September 2013
15:30 EEST

PAS Giannina	0–0	Aiginiakos
	Report

Zosimades Stadium, Ioannina
Referee: Fotis Fotiadis (Kastoria)
30 October 2013
15:00 EET

Aiginiakos	1–0	PAS Giannina
Čurlinov 24'	Report

Aiginio Municipal Stadium, Aiginio
Referee: Giannis Papadopoulos (Macedonia)

Aiginiakos won 1–0 on aggregate.

25 September 2013
20:30 EEST

Panionios	3–1	Apollon Kalamarias
Kampantais 31', 37'; Mendrinos 84'	Report	Ventzios 35'

Nea Smyrni Stadium, Nea Smyrni
Referee: Giorgos Foukakis (Heraklion)
30 October 2013
15:30 EET

Apollon Kalamarias	0–0	Panionios
	Report

Kalamaria Stadium, Thessaloniki
Referee: Kostas Balatsoukas (Thesprotia)

Panionios won 3–1 on aggregate.

26 September 2013
15:30 EEST

Kerkyra	0–1	Panetolikos
	Report	Pasas 60'

Kerkyra Stadium, Corfu
Referee: Gerasimos Ditsos (Preveza)
31 October 2013
15:30 EET

Panetolikos	1–0	Kerkyra
Bellón 88'	Report

Panetolikos Stadium, Agrinio
Referee: Spyros Selimos (Laconia)

Panetolikos won 2–0 on aggregate.

26 September 2013
15:30 EEST

Pierikos	1–2	AEL Kalloni
Katharios 32'	Report	Gašić 24'; Perrone 90+3'

Katerini Municipal Stadium, Katerini
Referee: Alexandros Katsikogiannis (Epirus)
31 October 2013
14:30 EET

AEL Kalloni	2–2	Pierikos
Manousos 19'; Kazakis 43'	Report	Brito 48', 68'

Kostas Kenteris Stadium, Lesbos
Referee: Andreas Pappas (Athens)

AEL Kalloni won 4–3 on aggregate.

== Round of 16 ==
The draw for this round took place on 11 November 2013.

=== Summary ===
'

Team 1	Agg.	Team 2	1st leg	2nd leg
Aiginiakos	1–3	Panionios	1–0	0–3
Panetolikos	0–4	Atromitos	0–2	0–2
Olympiacos	5–0	Asteras Tripolis	4–0	1–0
OFI	2–1	AEL Kalloni	0–1	2–0
Olympiacos Volos	4–1	Asteras Magoula	2–0	2–1
Iraklis	1–6	PAOK	0–1	1–5
Apollon Smyrnis	3–2	Niki Volos	3–1	0–1
Panathinaikos	4–0	Iraklis Psachna	3–0	1–0

=== Matches ===
8 January 2014
18:00 EET

Aiginiakos	1–0	Panionios
Giatsitzoglou 66' (pen.)	Report

Katerini Municipal Stadium, Katerini
Referee: Praxitelis Zachariadis (Macedonia)
23 January 2014
20:00 EET

Panionios	3–0	Aiginiakos
Giannou 17'; Lasnik 42'; Kurdi 86'	Report

Nea Smyrni Stadium, Nea Smyrni
Referee: Michalis Voskakis (Rethymnο)

Panionios won 3–1 on aggregate.

4 December 2013
20:00 EET

Panetolikos	0–2	Atromitos
	Report	Fábio 15'; Karamanos 18'

Panetolikos Stadium, Agrinio
Referee: Alexandros Aretopoulos (Trikala)
15 January 2014
20:00 EET

Atromitos	2–0	Panetolikos
Fytanidis 50'; Brito 80'	Report

Peristeri Stadium, Peristeri
Referee: Athanasios Giachos (Chios)

Atromitos won 4–0 on aggregate.

8 January 2014
20:00 EET

Olympiacos	4–0	Asteras Tripolis
Domínguez 17' (pen.); Campbell 35'; Bong 56'; Olaitan 60'	Report

Karaiskakis Stadium, Piraeus
Referee: Stavros Mantalos (Athens)
22 January 2014
20:00 EET

Asteras Tripolis	0–1	Olympiacos
	Report	Šćepović 79'

Theodoros Kolokotronis Stadium, Tripoli
Referee: Anastasios Sidiropoulos (Dodecanese)

Olympiacos won 5–0 on aggregate.

4 December 2013
18:00 EET

OFI	0–1	AEL Kalloni
	Report	Kazakis 83'

Theodoros Vardinogiannis Stadium, Heraklion
Referee: Athanasios Giachos (Chios)
16 January 2014
17:00 EET

AEL Kalloni	0–2	OFI
	Report	Perogamvrakis 80'; Papazoglou 107'

Olympic Stadium, Marousi
Referee: Stavros Tritsonis (Athens)

OFI won 2–1 on aggregate.

9 January 2014
18:00 EET

Olympiacos Volos	2–0	Asteras Magoula
Dinopapas 68'; Gurma 87'	Report

Volos Municipal Stadium, Volos
Referee: Giorgos Daskalopoulos (Corinthia)
23 January 2014
17:00 EET

Asteras Magoula	1–2	Olympiacos Volos
Dimitriadis 73'	Report	Nikolias 21'; Kapetanos 83'

Eleusis Municipal Stadium, Eleusis
Referee: Ioannis Delfakis (Arcadia)

Olympiacos Volos won 4–1 on aggregate.

9 January 2014
20:00 EET

Iraklis	0–1	PAOK
	Report	Athanasiadis 58'

Kaftanzoglio Stadium, Thessaloniki
Referee: Aristomenis Koutsiaftis (Arta)
22 January 2014
17:00 EET

PAOK	5–1	Iraklis
Athanasiadis 20'; Stoch 22', 55'; Oliseh 81'; Martens 90+3'	Report	Pourtoulidis 4'

Toumba Stadium, Thessaloniki
Attendance: 9,788
Referee: Apostolos Abarkiolis (Macedonia)

PAOK won 6–1 on aggregate.

5 December 2013
18:00 EET

Apollon Smyrnis	3–1	Niki Volos
Blažek 29'; Barkoglou 42', 64'	Report	Seymand 37'

Georgios Kamaras Stadium, Rizoupoli
Referee: Giorgos Daskalopoulos (Corinthia)
16 January 2014
20:00 EET

Niki Volos	1–0	Apollon Smyrnis
Tsitas 82'	Report

Panthessaliko Stadium, Volos
Referee: Apostolos Abarkiolis (Macedonia)

Apollon Smyrnis won 3–2 on aggregate.

5 December 2013
20:00 EET

Panathinaikos	3–0	Iraklis Psachna
Donis 35'; Klonaridis 58'; Karelis 59'	Report

Leoforos Alexandras Stadium, Ampelokipoi
Referee: Giannis Delfakis (Arcadia)
15 January 2014
17:00 EET

Iraklis Psachna	0–1	Panathinaikos
	Report	Ajagun 71'

Psachna Municipal Stadium, Euboea
Referee: Alexandros Dimitropoulos (Phthiotis)

Panathinaikos won 4–0 on aggregate.

== Quarter-finals ==
The draw for this round took place on 11 November 2013, after the Round of 16 draw.

=== Summary ===
Team 1	Agg.	Team 2	1st leg	2nd leg
PAOK	6–0	Apollon Smyrnis	3–0	3–0
OFI	4–1	Panionios	2–0	2–1
Olympiacos	(a) 1–1	Atromitos	0–0	1–1
Panathinaikos	4–1	Olympiacos Volos	4–0	0–1

=== Matches ===
30 January 2014
20:00 EET

PAOK	3–0	Apollon Smyrnis
Vukić 27', 35'; Maduro 76'	Report

Toumba Stadium, Thessaloniki
Attendance: 8,559
Referee: Giorgos Daskalopoulos (Corinthia)
13 February 2014
19:00 EET

Apollon Smyrnis	0–3	PAOK
	Report	Athanasiadis 42'; Koulouris 54', 90'

Georgios Kamaras Stadium, Rizoupoli
Referee: Gerasimos Ditsios (Preveza)

PAOK won 6–0 on aggregate.

29 January 2014
16:00 EET

OFI	2–0	Panionios
Papazoglou 61'; Kalajdžić 65' (pen.)	Report

Theodoros Vardinogiannis Stadium, Heraklion
Referee: Dimitris Thanos (Grevena)
13 February 2014
16:00 EET

Panionios	1–2	OFI
Kolovos 66'	Report	Makris 64'; Dudu 80'

Nea Smyrni Stadium, Nea Smyrni
Referee: Giannis Kabaxis (Euboea)

OFI won 4–1 on aggregate.

29 January 2014
20:00 EET

Olympiacos	0–0	Atromitos
	Report

Karaiskakis Stadium, Piraeus
Referee: Andreas Pappas (Athens)
12 February 2014
19:00 EET

Atromitos	1–1	Olympiacos
Tavlaridis 42'	Report	Domínguez 56' (pen.)

Peristeri Stadium, Peristeri
Referee: Stavros Mantalos (Kavala)

Olympiacos won on away goals.

29 January 2014
18:00 EET

Panathinaikos	4–0	Olympiacos Volos
Ajagun 48'; Bajrami 57'; Berg 73'; Karelis 89'	Report

Leoforos Alexandras Stadium, Ampelokipoi
Referee: Michael Koukoulakis (Heraklion)
12 February 2014
16:00 EET

Olympiacos Volos	1–0	Panathinaikos
Kapetanos 72'	Report

Volos Municipal Stadium, Volos
Referee: Stefanos Mandakis (Imathia)

Panathinaikos won 4–1 on aggregate.

== Semi-finals ==
The draw for this round took place on 11 November 2013, after the quarter-final draw.

=== Summary ===
Team 1	Agg.	Team 2	1st leg	2nd leg
OFI	1–3	Panathinaikos	1–0	0–3 (a.e.t.)
Olympiacos	2–2 (a)	PAOK	2–1	0–1

=== Matches ===
19 March 2014
19:00 EET

OFI	1–0	Panathinaikos
Papazoglou 69'	Report

Theodoros Vardinogiannis Stadium, Heraklion
Referee: Andreas Pappas (Athens)
16 April 2014
17:00 EEST

Panathinaikos	3–0 (a.e.t.)	OFI
Abeid 20'; Berg 96', 115' (pen.)	Report

Leoforos Alexandras Stadium, Ampelokipoi
Attendance: 16,003
Referee: Anastasios Sidiropoulos (Dodecanese)

Panathinaikos won 3–1 on aggregate.

2 April 2014
19:00 EEST

Olympiacos	2–1	PAOK
Domínguez 8'; Fuster 11'	Report	Athanasiadis 31'

Karaiskakis Stadium, Piraeus
Referee: Christos Kalogeropoulos (Athens)
16 April 2014
20:00 EEST

PAOK	1–0	Olympiacos
Athanasiadis 47'	Report

Toumba Stadium, Thessaloniki
Attendance: 28,703
Referee: Stavros Mantalos (Athens)

PAOK won on away goals.

== Final ==
26 April 2014
20:00 EEST

Panathinaikos	4–1	PAOK
Berg 15', 50', 88'; Karelis 54'	Report	Vukić 70' (pen.)

Athens Olympic Stadium, Marousi
Attendance: 44,356
Referee: Anastassios Kakos (Corfu)

== Top scorers ==
Rank	Player	Club	Goals
1	(Sweden) Marcus Berg	Panathinaikos	7
2	(Greece) Stefanos Athanasiadis	PAOK	5
3	(Greece) Anastasios Karamanos	Atromitos	4
3	(Serbia) Zvonimir Vukić	PAOK	4
3	(Greece) Thanasis Papazoglou	OFI	4
6	(Spain) Isaac Jové	Niki Volos	3
6	(Serbia) Marko Šćepović	Olympiacos	3
6	(Nigeria) Michael Olaitan	Olympiacos	3
6	(Argentina) Alejandro Domínguez	Olympiacos	3
6	(Greece) Nikos Karelis	Panathinaikos	3
