= Vallianos =

Vallianos is a surname. Notable people with the surname include:

- Kostas Vallianos (born 1937), Greek footballer
- Vasilios Vallianos (born 1988), Greek footballer
