= Pautasso =

Pautasso is a surname. Notable people with the surname include:

- Jorge Pautasso (born 1962), Argentine football manager and former player
- Martin Pautasso (born 1979), Argentine football player
