= Christos Bourbos =

Greek footballer (born 1983)

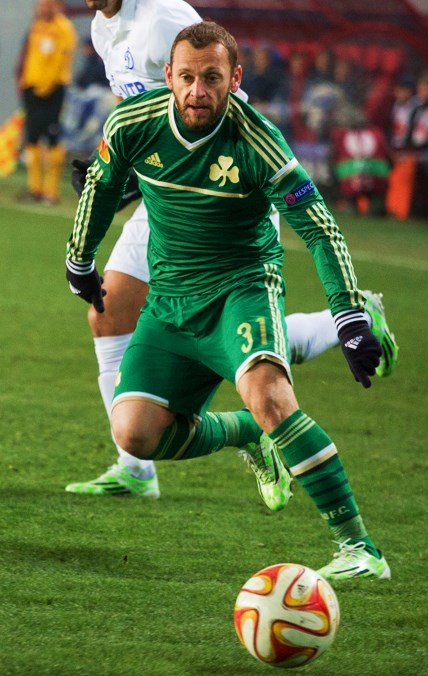

Personal information
- Full name: Christos Bourbos
- Date of birth: 1 June 1983 (age 43)
- Place of birth: Ioannina, Greece
- Height: 1.80 m (5 ft 11 in)
- Position: Right-back

Senior career*
Years	Team	Apps	(Gls)
2001–2004	PAS Giannina	31	(2)
2004–2008	AEK Athens	32	(0)
2006–2007	→ Kerkyra (loan)	14	(1)
2008–2009	Iraklis	15	(0)
2009–2014	OFI	95	(0)
2014–2016	Panathinaikos	25	(0)
2016–2018	Aris	37	(0)

International career^{‡}
2004–2006	Greece U21	8	(1)
- * Club domestic league appearances and goals as of 24 March 2018 ‡ National team caps and goals as of 6 April 2008

Christos Bourbos (Greek: Χρήστος Μπούρμπος; born 1 June 1983) is a Greek former professional footballer who played as a right-back.

== Club career ==
=== PAS Giannina ===
Bourbos started his professdional career in 2001 playing for PAS Giannina, where he was used as a striker. He made his first 7 appearances with the club in the 2001–02 season as a rising star, helping the club to be promoted in the first division. But the next year 2002–03 did not be among the first priorities of the manager, the club was relegated and started to play the year after (2003–04 season) when the club is playing in second division making 24 appearances. During these 3 periods he scored only two goals but he made 17 assists, being the first for his club.

=== AEK Athens ===
On 30 July 2004 Bourbos signed for AEK Athens. The manager Fernando Santos relocated him as a right back. In his first season in AEK Athens, he was an indispensable member of the club (as well in Greece under 21), contributing with many assists. He managed to being among the first priorities of Santos having 15 appearances in the League, 6 in the Greek Cup and two in UEFA Cup. An injury in 2005, deprived him from playing in the starting XI, hence in season 2005–2006 having just 2 appearances.

=== Kerkyra ===
In the summer of 2006 the manager Lorenzo Serra Ferrer having two other right-backs, Nikolaos Georgeas and Martin Albano Pautasso proposed him a loan move, to Niki Volos. However, Bourbos refused. But a few hours before the end transfer window deadline Kerkyra made an offer for Bourbos' loan, including the payment of his annual wage. Thus on 17 August he was eventually loaned to the club of Corfu. He returned to AEK Athens at the end of the season as he was not in the plans of the manager of Kerkyra, Babis Tennes.

=== Iraklis ===
On 27 June 2008, Bourbos signed with Iraklis on a two-year contract for an undisclosed fee. A day before his deal with the club Bourbos stated in Sports Metropolis: "I feel bitterness leaving AEK. I talked with the president, Antonis Remos but mostly Ilias Poursanidis. I will sign for two years. Iraklis wants to make a strong team. I did not play often with AEK and I expects to play with my new club. This is a reason why I decided to join the club, besides the fact that I will continue playing in the highest level (i.e. Super League)."

His career is declining and during 1,5-year in Iraklis did not succeed to make the difference. He made his debut with the club in a 2–1 home loss against Panserraikos. Eventually he left the club due to financial problems.

In April 2011, after his departure from the club, newspapers claimed that the club still owes him €35,580. The player expected to take legal action. This means that if the club continues to prove inconsistent with the player could face a deduction of points. Already spokesman footballer Lakis Simeoforidis an ex-player and advocate, has informed HFF and Super League Greece, in order to start all the necessary procedures and informing the Board of License Commission.

=== OFI ===
OFI did not actually being among his first priorities, but the club gave him the opportunity to celebrate another promotion to the Greek Super League and put him in the football 'map' again. On 26 September 2010, he made his debut with the club in a 0–0 home draw against Kallithea. In January 2012, he scored the only goal with the club in a 3–1 away win against Panetolikos for the Greek Football Cup. He made 99 appearances in all competitions with the club scoring one goal.

It seemed for long time that something's up with Bourbos and finally suspicions, took flesh and bones. Christos Bourbos filed an appeal to safeguard his salaries, which exceed €320,000! The player who has a contract with OFI, tried to come to an agreement with the president of the club Manthos Poulinakis, but this never happened. The 30-year-old right-back, took the decision to make the appeal as "I got tired of waiting and fooling him. The debts have to do with my presence in the club in the last three years, and each time, I did not take the money provided in my contract." the player said. In the 2013–14 season Bourbos was one of the best players of the club. The blow is economical for OFI and if the player is left free, the club loses a key member. The appeal of Bourbos added to that of Ricardo Verón, for a similar reason is clearly a big thorn for the club.

=== Panathinaikos ===
On 7 July 2014 Bourbos has signed a two years' contract with Panathinaikos. On 30 November 2015, according to newspapers' rumours Christos Bourbos is expected to leave Panathinaikos in January transfer window, because they are not in the plans of manager Andrea Stramaccioni, as he played only one match in 2015-16 season. The right defender is a transfer target of Veria. On 10 January 2016, Bourbos is finally expected to leave Panathinaikos within the month with a small compensation for his contract termination. On 3 February 2016,Panathinaikos terminated Bourbos's contract by immediate effect. The Greek right-back was not among Andrea Stramaccioni's plans and both sides took the decision to terminate his contract.

=== Aris ===
On 18 July 2016, Aris officially announced the signing of experienced right defender, who was recently released from Panathinaikos, until the summer of 2018.

== International career ==
Bourbos represented Greece U21 from 2004 to 2006 making 8 appearnces and scoring once.
