= Dániel Tőzsér =

Hungarian footballer (born 1985)

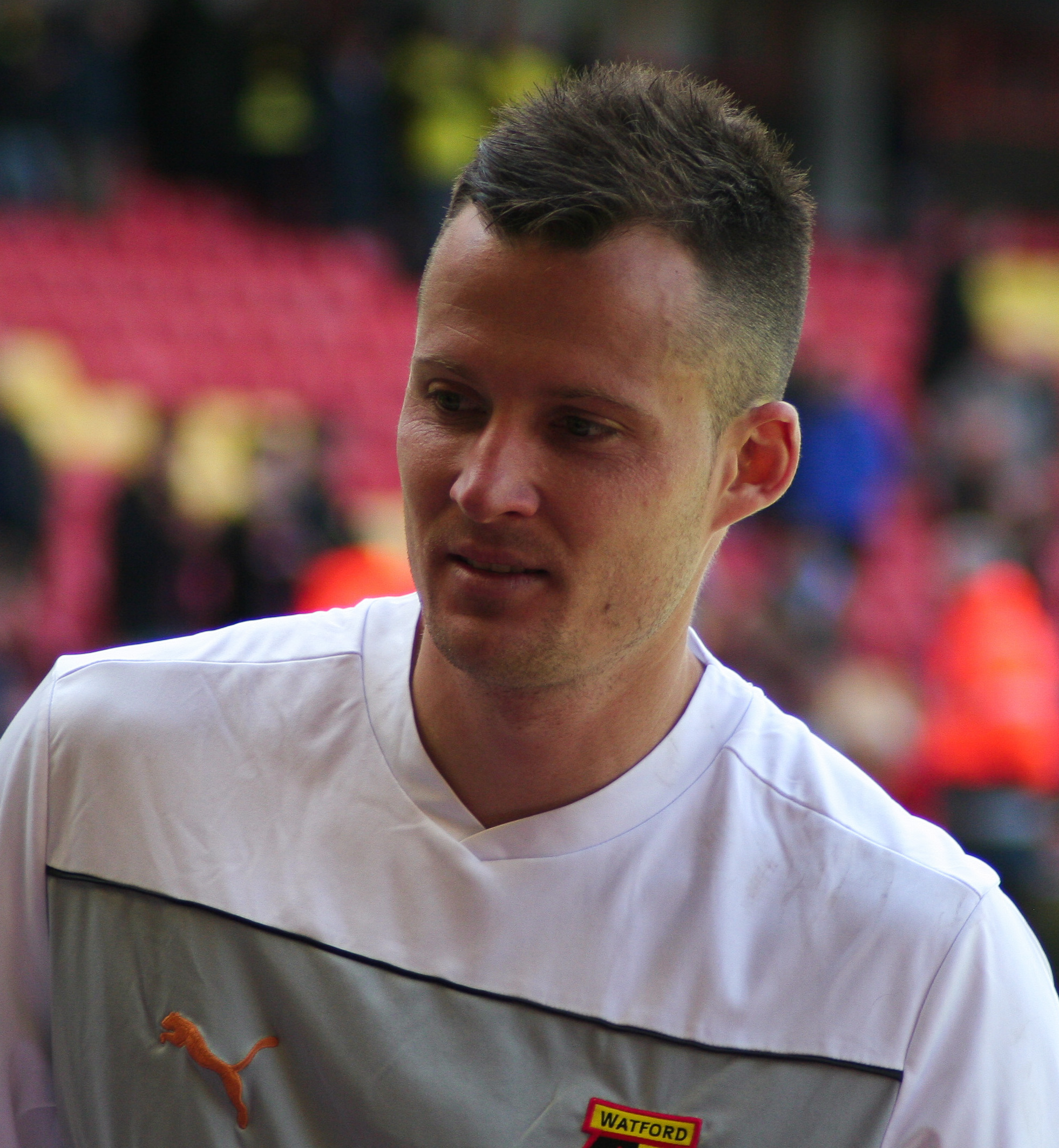
- Tőzsér with Watford in 2014

Personal information
- Date of birth: 12 May 1985 (age 41)
- Place of birth: Szolnok, Hungary
- Height: 1.87 m (6 ft 1 1/2 in)
- Position: Central midfielder

Youth career
- 2002–2003: Debrecen
- 2003–2004: Galatasaray

Senior career*
Years	Team	Apps	(Gls)
2004–2006	Ferencváros	54	(3)
2006–2008	AEK Athens	37	(3)
2008–2012	Racing Genk	132	(17)
2012–2014	Genoa	22	(0)
2014	→ Watford (loan)	20	(0)
2014–2015	Parma	0	(0)
2014–2015	→ Watford (loan)	45	(5)
2015–2016	Queens Park Rangers	16	(1)
2016–2020	Debrecen	104	(17)
Total		430	(46)

International career
1999–2000	Hungary U21	2	(0)
2006–2015	Hungary	31	(1)

Managerial career
- 2020–2022: Debrecen (sporting director)
- * Club domestic league appearances and goals

Dániel Tőzsér (Hungarian: [ˈdaːniɛl ˈtøːʒeːr]; born 12 May 1985) is a Hungarian professional football official and a former midfielder. He works as a sporting director for Debrecen. He also played for the Hungary national team. A left-footed player, he played on the central, defensive or the left side of midfield.

== Club career ==
Dániel Tőzsér graduated through the youth ranks at Debrecen. He managed 1 first team appearance for Debrecen. Tőzsér transferred to Turkey with Galatasaray youth team in 2003, aged 17, but didn't manage to make any appearances for the first team. After one year with the club, Tőzsér moved to Hungarian club Ferencváros.

=== Ferencváros ===
Tőzsér signed a professional contract with Ferencváros in what turned out to be a successful two years at the club. Club manager, Bobby Davison, called Tőzsér the Hungarian Frank Lampard. In total Tőzsér made 54 apps and scored 3 goals over 2 years with the club, before moving to AEK Athens in 2006.

=== AEK Athens ===
With AEK Athens, Tőzsér managed 35 appearances and 3 goals. AEK manager Llorenç Serra Ferrer said he had talent and a great future ahead of him. Tőzsér wore the number 88. He scored his first goal against OFI with a stunning strike. Tőzsér also played an important role in AEK's UEFA Champions League run and was voted man of the match against Anderlecht. Following the match and evidently impressed, Anderlecht attempted to sign Tőzsér, however AEK declined the offers. He also gave the assist for the goal of Nikos Liberopoulos against Hearts. After 2 years at the club, he departed to Belgian team Racing Genk.

=== Genk ===
On 5 June 2008, Genk announced the signing of Tőzsér on a four-year deal. According to several Greek newspapers the Belgian club paid around €1.500,000. In Genk, Dániel would play alongside fellow Hungarian, Balázs Tóth. He stated that he hoped by doing well at Genk he would regain his place in the Hungary national team. He also stated that he wanted to win the Belgian title with Genk. On 16 August, he captained his side against Porto in a 4–2 defeat. On 21 July 2011, Tőzsér won the Belgian Supercup beating Standard Liège. Tőzsér scored the only goal of the match. On 23 August 2011, Tőzsér and his Hungarian teammate László Köteles played an important role in qualifying for the group stages of the UEFA Champions League 2011–12 season. Genk beat Maccabi Haifa 4–1 on penalties. On 13 September 2011, Tőzsér debuted in the UEFA Champions League against Valencia. The result was a goalless draw.

=== Genoa ===
In February 2012, it was announced that Tözsér would be leaving Genk at the end of the season, with a four-year contract having been agreed with Italian side Genoa. Tözsér struggled for consistency in his first season, making only 22 appearances for the Serie A club. Having fallen out of favour with head coach Gian Piero Gasperini the following season, Tözsér joined long-term admirers Watford on loan.

==== Watford (loan) ====
On 29 January 2014, Tőzsér joined Watford on loan for the remainder of the 2013–14 season, with a view to signing a permanent deal. Tőzsér made his Watford debut in a 2–0 win over Brighton on 2 February 2014, playing the full 90 minutes.

=== Parma ===
After two years at Genoa, and a loan spell in 2014 with Watford, Tőzsér signed for fellow Serie A side Parma on 5 July 2014 signing a two-year contract.

==== Return to Watford (loan) ====
Following his move to Parma in early July as part of the deal that Aleandro Rosi moved to Genoa., Tőzsér returned to Watford on 7 July 2014 signing a two-year loan deal with the option of a third.

He scored his first goal for Watford in a 4–1 win against Leeds United on 23 August 2014.

On 1 November 2014, Tőzsér scored a superb free-kick in the 45th minute against Millwall in a 3–1 victory in the 2014–15 Football League Championship season.

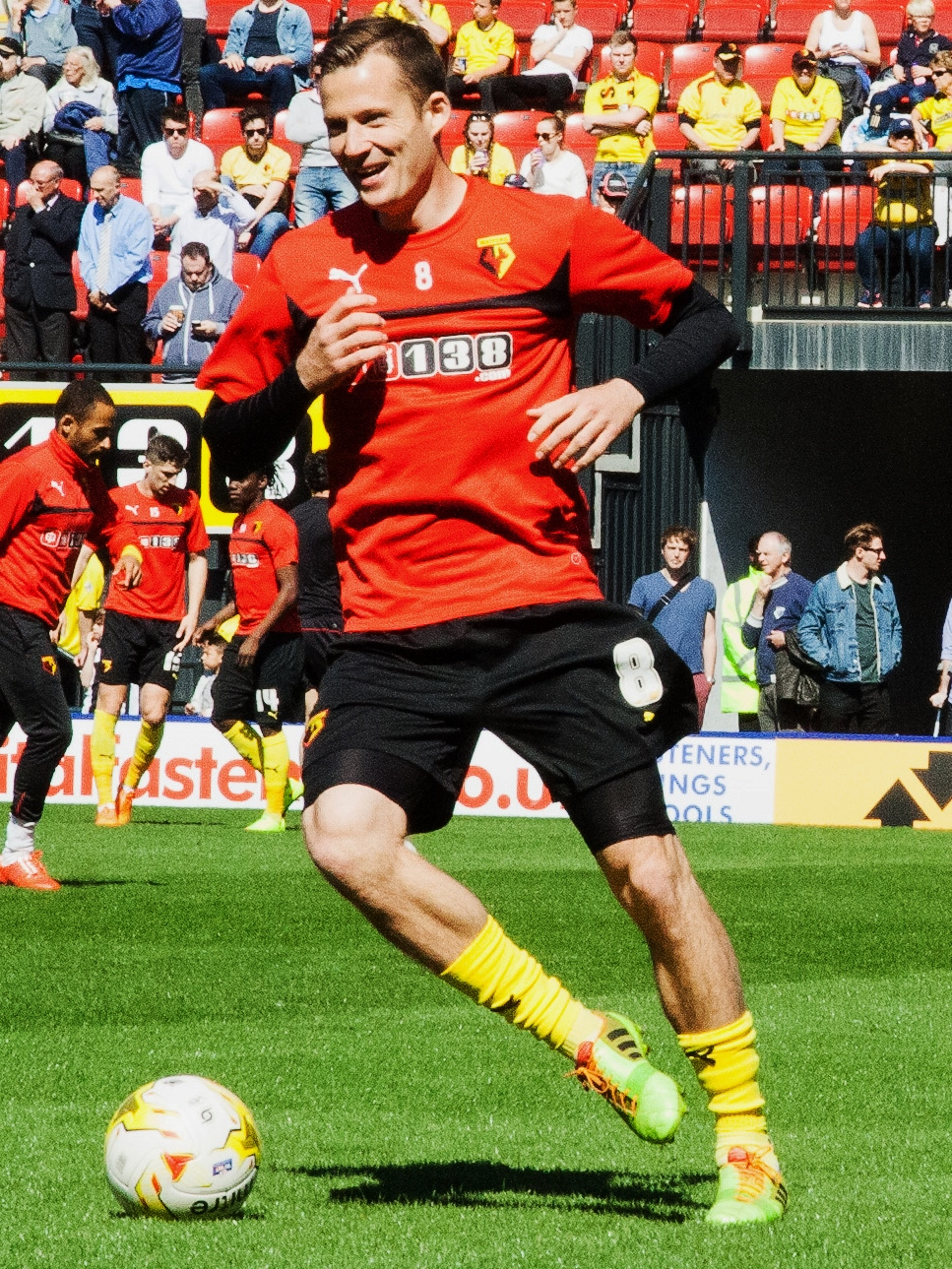
Tőzsér playing for Watford F.C.

Tőzsér was cited as the Watford's unsung hero of the 2014–15 Football League Championship by the journalist of Here Is The City.

Despite playing a crucial role in Watford's promotion to the Premier League, Tőzsér announced he would be leaving the club early, just one year into a two-year loan from Parma.

=== Queens Park Rangers ===
On 28 August 2015, Tőzsér completed a move to QPR on a two-year deal. The first of two of Watford's promotion winning side to sign for QPR during the summer transfer window. He scored his first goal for QPR in a 1–1 draw with Sheffield Wednesday on 23 February 2016.

== Career statistics ==
As of match played 27 June 2020

Club	Season	League			FA Cup		League Cup		Europe		Other		Total	
Club	Season	Division	Apps	Goals	Apps	Goals	Apps	Goals	Apps	Goals	Apps	Goals	Apps	Goals
Ferencváros	2004-05	Hungarian League	27	1	-				7 (Note: 1 Appearance in UEFA Champions League, 6 appearances in UEFA Cup)	1 (Note: Goal in UEFA Cup)			34	2
Ferencváros	2005-06	Hungarian League	27	2	-				2 (Note: 2 Appearances in UEFA Cup)	0			29	2
Ferencváros	Total		54	3					9	1			63	4
AEK	2006–07	Super League Greece	23	2	-		0	0	10 (Note: 8 Appearances in UEFA Champions League, 2 appearances in UEFA Europa League)	0	0	0	33	2
AEK	2007–08	Super League Greece	14	1	-		2	0	8 (Note: 2 Appearances in UEFA Champions League, 6 appearances in UEFA Europa League)	0	0	0	24	1
AEK	Total		37	3	0	0	2	0	18	0	0	0	57	3
Racing Genk	2008-09	Belgian Pro League	25	2	-		0	0	0	0	0	0	25	2
Racing Genk	2009-10	Belgian Pro League	38	5	-		2	0	2 (Note: Appearances in UEFA Europa League)	2	1 (Note: Appearances in Belgian Super Cup)	0	42	5
Racing Genk	2010-11	Belgian Pro League	39	8	-		1	0	4	1	0	0	44	9
Racing Genk	2011-12	Belgian Pro League	30	2	-		2	0	10 (Note: Appearances in UEFA Champions League)	0	1	1	43	3
Racing Genk	Total		132	17	0	0	5	0	16	3	2	1	154	19
Genoa	2012–13	Serie A	22	0	-		0	0	0	0	0	0	22	0
Watford (loan)	2013–14	Championship	20	0	0	0	0	0	0	0	0	0	20	0
Watford (loan)	2014–15	Championship	45	5	1	0	0	0	0	0	0	0	46	5
Watford (loan)	Total		65	5	1	0	0	0	0	0	0	0	88	5
Queens Park Rangers	2015–16	Championship	14	1	1	0	0	0	0	0	0	0	15	1
Debrecen	2016-17	Hungarian League	24	4	1	0	0	0	0	0	0	0	25	4
Debrecen	2017-18	Hungarian League	32	6	5	0	0	0	0	0	0	0	37	6
Debrecen	2018-19	Hungarian League	27	5	3	0	0	0	0	0	0	0	30	5
Debrecen	2019-20	Hungarian League	21	2	1	0	0	0	4	0	0	0	26	2
Debrecen	Total		104	17	10	0			4	0			118	17
Career total			406	46	12	0	7	0	39	3	2	1	495	49

== International career ==
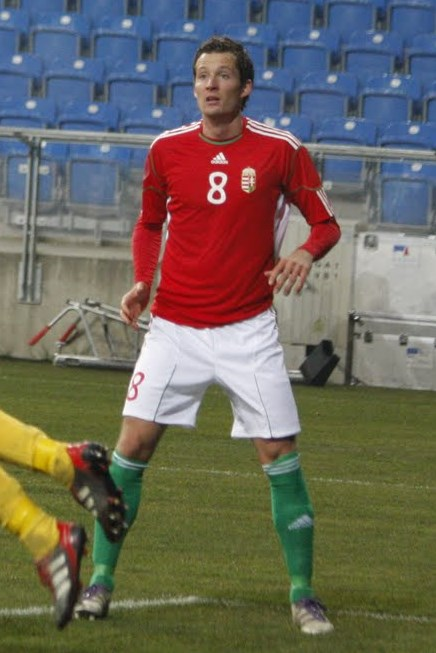
Tőzsér playing for Hungary in 2011.

Tőzsér made his international debut on 14 December 2005 against Mexico. Tőzsér scored his first international goal against Malta during a Euro 2008 Qualifier, putting Hungary two goals in front with a stunning free kick.

National team	Season	Apps	Goals
Hungary	2005	2	0
Hungary	2006	0	0
Hungary	2007	11	1
Hungary	2008	2	0
Hungary	2009	1	0
Hungary	2010	2	0
Hungary	2011	2	0
Hungary	2012	0	0
Hungary	2013	0	0
Hungary	2014	6	0
Hungary	2015	5	0
Total		31	1

=== International goals ===
Scores and results list Hungary's goal tally first.

#	Date	Venue	Opponent	Score	Result	Competition
1.	13 October 2007	Szusza Ferenc Stadium, Budapest, Hungary	Malta	2–0	2–0	UEFA Euro 2008 qualification

== Personal life ==
Tőzsér married on 21 June 2008 to Zsanett Lénárt. On 3 September 2011, Tőzsér appeared on the breakfast football show Soccer AM.

== Honours ==
- Belgian Cup: 2008–09
- Belgian Pro League: 2010–11
- Belgian Super Cup: 2011
