= Wellington (footballer, born June 1981) =

Brazilian footballer

Personal information
- Full name: Wellington Damião Nogueira Marinho
- Date of birth: 13 June 1981 (age 45)
- Place of birth: São Paulo, Brazil
- Height: 1.87 m (6 ft 2 in)
- Position: Centre-back

Team information
- Current team: São Bernardo FC

Senior career*
Years	Team	Apps	(Gls)
- ?
2004	Nacional (SP)		
2005	Oeste		
2006	Sporting Braga	4	(0)
2006–2007	OFI	22	(3)
2007–2008	Portimonense	25	(3)
2008–2009	Santa Clara	5	(0)
2010–	São Bernardo FC		
- * Club domestic league appearances and goals

Wellington Damião Nogueira Marinho (born 13 June 1981) is a Brazilian footballer. He plays for São Bernardo FC.

In February 2006, he was signed by Sporting Braga. He then spent 3 more seasons in Europe. After without a club for a season, he signed a 1-year contract with São Bernardo FC.
