= Christos Routsis =

Greek footballer

Personal information
- Date of birth: 26 October 1985 (age 41)
- Place of birth: Drama, Greece
- Height: 1.81 m (5 ft 11 1/2 in)
- Position: Midfielder

Youth career
- –2005: Anakalipsi Drama

Senior career*
Years	Team	Apps	(Gls)
2005–2010	Panserraikos	32	(0)
2008–2009	→ Doxa Drama (loan)	28	(2)
2010–2012	Doxa Drama	48	(2)
2012–2013	Iraklis Psachna	32	(2)
2013–2014	Doxa Drama	24	(1)
2014–2018	Panserraikos	100	(8)
2018	Agrotikos Asteras		
- * Club domestic league appearances and goals as of 6 July 2018

Christos Routsis (Greek: Χρήστος Ρούτσης, born 26 October 1985) is a professional Greek football player.

== Career ==
He started his career in 2005 for Panserraikos. In 2008, he moved in a season-long loan to Gamma Ethniki side Doxa Drama.

Routsis joined Doxa Drama permanently in 2010.
