= Michal Lesák =

Czech footballer (born 1975)

Personal information
- Date of birth: 18 August 1975 (age 51)
- Place of birth: Kutná Hora, Czechoslovakia
- Height: 1.83 m (6 ft 0 in)
- Position: Midfielder

Senior career*
Years	Team	Apps	(Gls)
1997–2003	FC Hradec Králové	37	(1)
2003–2005	FC Bohemians Praha	14	(1)
2005	FK Marila Příbram	11	(3)
2005–2006	FC Baník Ostrava	9	(0)
2006–2007	FK Marila Příbram	18	(0)
2007	FK AS Trenčín		
- * Club domestic league appearances and goals as of 7 October 2007

Michal Lesák (born 18 August 1975 in Kutná Hora) is a Czech former footballer who played as a defender.
