= Daniel Edusei =

Ghanaian International football defender

Personal information
- Date of birth: 2 September 1980 (age 46)
- Place of birth: Kumasi, Ghana
- Height: 1.68 m (5 ft 6 in)
- Position: Defender

Senior career*
| Years | Team | Apps | (Gls) |
| 1997–1998 | Ghapoha Readers | | |
| 1999–2001 | Athinaikos | 55 | (1) |
| 2001–2002 | Ethnikos Asteras | 21 | (1) |
| 2002–2008 | Egaleo | 130 | (1) |
| 2008–2009 | Ethnikos Achnas | 23 | (0) |

International career
| 1998–2006 | Ghana | 19 | (0) |
- * Club domestic league appearances and goals

Daniel Edusei (born 2 September 1980) is a Ghanaian former professional footballer who played as a defender. He represented the Ghana national team between 1998 and 2006.

== Career ==
Edusei was born in Kumasi. He signed a five-year contract with Egaleo in summer 2002. He played a season in Beta Ethniki before left for Ethnikos Achna in summer 2008.
