= Athanasios Stoikos =

Greek footballer

Thanasis Stoikos
Personal information
- Full name: Athanasios Stoikos
- Date of birth: 28 January 1988 (age 38)
- Place of birth: Serres, Greece
- Height: 1.82 m (5 ft 11 1/2 in)
- Position: Midfielder

Youth career
- 2005–2007: Brescia Calcio
- 2007–2008: Triestina Calcio

Senior career*
Years	Team	Apps	(Gls)
2008–2010	Panthrakikos	12	(0)
2010–2011	Iraklis	0	(0)
2011–2012	Fokikos	16	(0)
2012–2013	Ethnikos Sidirokastro	9	(2)
2013–2016	Doxa Drama	30	(1)
- * Club domestic league appearances and goals as of 22 August 2017

Athanasios Stoikos (Greek: Θανάσης Στόικος; born 28 January 1988) is a retired Greek footballer.

== Career ==
Born in Serres, Stoikos made his professional debut for Panthrakikos in the Super League Greece. After a knee injury he was forced to retire at the age of 28 in 2016.

== Personal life ==
He hails from Agio Pnevma, Serres.
