= Nikos Zourkos =

Greek footballer

Personal information
- Full name: Nikolaos Zourkos
- Date of birth: 27 October 1989 (age 37)
- Place of birth: Akrolimni, Pella, Greece
- Height: 1.80 m (5 ft 11 in)
- Position: Attacking midfielder

Team information
- Current team: Veria
- Number: 8

Senior career*
Years	Team	Apps	(Gls)
2010–2011	Naoussa		
2011–2012	Lefkadia		
2012–2018	Aiginiakos	123	(10)
2018–2019	Giannitsa		
2019–	Veria	16	(1)
- * Club domestic league appearances and goals as of 18 August 2020

Nikos Zourkos (Greek: Νίκος Ζούρκος; born 27 October 1989) is a Greek professional footballer who plays as an attacking midfielder for Football League club Veria.
