= Christos Nonis =

Greek footballer

Personal information
- Date of birth: 13 June 1991 (age 35)
- Place of birth: Larissa, Greece
- Height: 1.91 m (6 ft 3 in)
- Position: Centre-back

Team information
- Current team: Anagennisi Karditsa
- Number: 4

Youth career
- AEL

Senior career*
Years	Team	Apps	(Gls)
2011	SC Idar-Oberstein	4	(0)
2011–2013	Tyrnavos		
2013–2014	Asteras Magoula	21	(1)
2014–2015	Zakynthos	22	(0)
2015–2016	Kallithea	5	(0)
2016	Chalkida		
2016–2017	Thesprotos		
2017–2019	Olympiacos Volos		
2019–2020	Thesprotos	19	(1)
2020–2021	Pannafpliakos		
2021	Anagennisi Karditsa		
2021	Aias Salamina	1	(0)
2022	Irodotos	8	(0)
2022–2023	Zakynthos	22	(2)
2023	Nea Artaki	5	(0)
2023–2024	AER Afantou	13	(2)
2024–2025	Panthrakikos		
2025–2026	Ilioupoli	8	(0)
2026	Ethnikos Piraeus		
2026–	Anagennisi Karditsa	0	(0)
- * Club domestic league appearances and goals as of 21:00, 11 January 2026 (UTC)

Christos Nonis (Greek: Χρήστος Νόνης; born 13 June 1991) is a Greek professional footballer who plays as a centre-back for Super League 2 club Anagennisi Karditsa.
