= Pavlos Katharios =

Greek footballer

Personal information
- Date of birth: 11 March 1992 (age 34)
- Place of birth: Thessaloniki, Greece
- Height: 1.74 m (5 ft 9 in)
- Position: Midfielder

Team information
- Current team: Agrotikos Asteras

Youth career
- Agrotikos Asteras

Senior career*
Years	Team	Apps	(Gls)
2009–2010	Agrotikos Asteras		
2010–2013	Xanthi	2	(0)
2012	→ Agrotikos Asteras (loan)	14	(2)
2012–2013	→ Pierikos (loan)	15	(1)
2013–2014	Pierikos	29	(2)
2014	Apollon Kalamarias	7	(0)
2014–2016	Agrotikos Asteras	51	(2)
2016–2017	Panachaiki		
2017	Pydna Kitros		
2017–2018	Kilkisiakos		
2018–2019	Nestos		
2019–2020	Kavala		
2020–2021	Iraklis		
2021–2022	Agrotikos Asteras		
2022–2025	Kampaniakos	51	(0)
2026–	Agrotikos Asteras		

International career
2011	Greece U19	3	(0)
- * Club domestic league appearances and goals as of 21:00, 3 May 2025 (UTC)

Pavlos Katharios (Greek: Παύλος Καθάριος; born 11 March 1992) is a Greek professional footballer who plays as a midfielder for Agrotikos Asteras.
