= Kostas Vallianos =

Greek footballer

Personal information
- Date of birth: 1 March 1937 (age 89)

International career
Years	Team	Apps	(Gls)
1960–1965	Greece	11	(0)

Kostas Vallianos (born 1 March 1937) is a Greek footballer. He played in eleven matches for the Greece national football team from 1960 to 1965.
