= Thanasis Tribonias =

Greek footballer and policeman

Personal information
- Full name: Athanasios Tribonias
- Date of birth: 2 May 1984
- Place of birth: Agios Dimitrios, Argolis, Greece
- Date of death: 24 July 2012 (aged 28)
- Place of death: Athens, Greece
- Positions: Left back; centre back

Youth career
- Pammetohikos
- 2001–2005: Diovouniotis Nafplio

Senior career*
Years	Team	Apps	(Gls)
2005–2009	Haidari	81	(1)
2009–2010	Nea Ionia		
- * Club domestic league appearances and goals

Thanasis Tribonias (Greek: Θανάσης Τριμπόνιας, 2 May 1984 – 24 July 2012) was a Greek footballer and Special Guard of the Hellenic Police. He played professionally for Haidari FC in the Beta Ethniki.

== Playing career ==
Tribonias was born in Agios Dimitrios, a village in the Argolis prefecture of Greece. He started his career at his local team Pammetohikos and when he was 16 years old he joined Nafplio-based Diovouniotis.

In 2005, he moved to Haidari – there he managed to make a total of 81 appearances for the club, 52 of which in the Beta Ethniki, as well as 3 appearances in the Greek Cup. In September 2009, Tribonias was released from Haidari and joined Delta Ethniki side Nea Ionia for a year.

== Personal life ==
Tribonias was a member of the Hellenic Police's Motorcycle Patrol Unit (Greek: ΔΙ.Α.Σ.) in Athens. On 24 July 2012, he and childhood friend and colleague Nikos Piteros were fatally injured in a traffic accident on Mesogeion Avenue while on duty when they lost control of their motorcycle.
