= Georgios Tsirogiannis =

Greek footballer

Personal information
- Full name: Georgios Tsirogiannis
- Date of birth: 2 June 1983 (age 43)
- Place of birth: Greece
- Position: Midfielder

Senior career*
Years	Team	Apps	(Gls)
1999–2002	Paniliakos		
2003–2004	Chalkida F.C.		
2004–2012	Egaleo		
2005–2006	→ Ilisiakos (loan)		
2006–2007	→ Chaidari (loan)		
2007–2008	→ Panachaiki (loan)		
2008	→ Ilioupoli (loan)		
- * Club domestic league appearances and goals

Georgios Tsirogiannis (Greek: Γεώργιος Τσιρογιάννης; born 2 June 1983) is a Greek football player who plays as a midfielder for Egaleo F.C. in the Greek Beta Ethniki.

== Career ==
Tsirogiannis previously played for Paniliakos F.C., Panachaiki, Ilisiakos F.C. and Chaidari F.C.
