= Orestis Nikolopoulos =

Greek footballer

Personal information
- Date of birth: 26 August 1991 (age 35)
- Place of birth: Athens, Greece
- Height: 1.92 m (6 ft 4 in)
- Position: Centre-back

Youth career
- Fostiras

Senior career*
Years	Team	Apps	(Gls)
2006–2008	Fostiras		
2008–2009	Egaleo	0	(0)
2009–2010	Aittitos Spata		
2010–2011	Glyfada		
2011–2012	Chalkida		
2012–2013	Fostiras	5	(0)
2013	Vyzas Megara	22	(0)
2013–2014	Iraklis Psachna	17	(1)
2014	Aris		
2014–2015	Alimos	20	(0)
2015–2016	Olympiacos Volos	4	(0)
2016	Fostiras		
2016–2017	Omonia Aradippou	25	(0)
2017–2018	Kalamata		
2018	Karaiskakis	10	(0)
2018–2020	Ħamrun Spartans	31	(0)
2020	Ayia Napa		
2021	Puteolana	4	(0)
2021	Olympia Agnonese	16	(0)
2021–2023	Ethnikos Piraeus		
2023	Aspropyrgos		
2023–2024	Proodeftiki		
2024–2025	Keratsini		
- * Club domestic league appearances and goals as of 19 June 2021

Orestis Nikolopoulos (Greek: Ορέστης Νικολόπουλος; born 26 August 1991) is a Greek professional footballer who plays as a centre-back.
