= Leonidas Kampantais =

Greek footballer

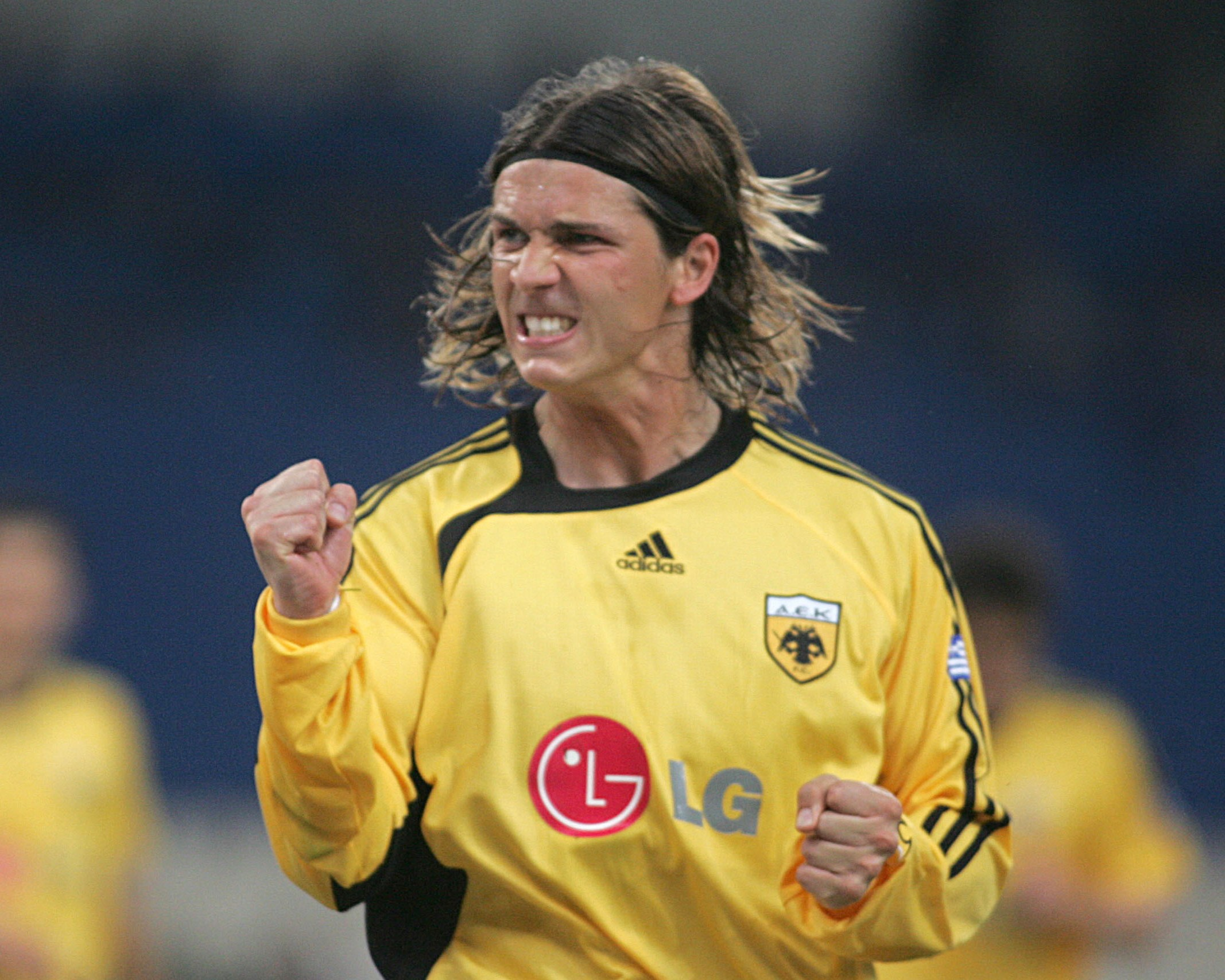

Personal information
- Full name: Leonidas Kampantais
- Date of birth: 8 March 1982 (age 44)
- Place of birth: Athens, Greece
- Height: 1.83 m (6 ft 0 in)
- Position: Striker

Youth career
- 1998–2000: Chaidari

Senior career*
Years	Team	Apps	(Gls)
2000–2004	Aris	18	(3)
2004–2007	AEK Athens	26	(8)
2005	→ Anorthosis Famagusta (loan)	9	(2)
2005–2006	→ Panionios (loan)	12	(2)
2007–2009	Arminia Bielefeld	8	(1)
2009–2010	Olympiacos Volos	19	(3)
2010–2012	OFI	35	(9)
2012–2014	Panionios	44	(5)
2015–2016	Kerkyra	9	(2)
2016–2018	Atlantis Anthoussa	0	(0)
- * Club domestic league appearances and goals as of 17 January 2016

Leonidas Kampantais (Greek: Λεωνίδας Καμπάνταης; born 8 March 1982) is a Greek professional footballer who last played as a striker for Atlantis Anthoussa.

== Career ==
=== Aris ===
Born in Athens, Greece, Kampantais began his professional career at Aris in 2002, appearing in 11 matches in Alpha Ethniki (in 2006 renamed to Super League), scoring two goals. He remained in Thessaloniki for another year, scoring one goal in seven appearances.

=== Move to AEK Athens ===
On 30 July 2004 joined AEK Athens in 2004. Kampantais picked number 11, which was used by Demis Nikolaidis, who was a fan favourite and the chairman of AEK Athens.

On 6 June 2005, after an indication of the manager, Fernando Santos he was loaned to Anorthosis Famagusta for a season. However, Kabantais returned after six months, in January 2006, after scoring only two goals and wasting numerous goal opportunities in 14 matches. Kampantais claimed that the reason Anorthosis released him due to personal problems he had with the manager Temur Ketsbaia. On 3 January 2006 he was loaned again to Panionios for six months.

In 2006, the club's director of football, Ilija Ivic adviced him to go on a loan again. However, Kampantais was unwilling to go, unless it was instructed by the new manager Lorenzo Serra Ferrer. Serra Ferrer gave him enough chances to prove his worth, but he did not register him for the UEFA Champions League matches, which upset Kampantais. Even though not considered as a first team regular, he was one of the best players in the friendly matches. Ferrer trusted him in the derby against Panathinaikos. Kampantais, even though he did not score, played a good match. The next matches in which Kampantais played were against Aris and AEL. These two matches were critical for AEK, and Kampantais managed to score in each game once (in both matches he was in the first team). Against Kerkyra, Kampantais was awarded two clear penalties. He was announced as Most Valuable Player in that match. That was the first time Kampantais was given this award. Since then, he appeared in every match and scored some goals. He was voted one of the two MVP in the big derby against Olympiacos in early February.

His contract with AEK expired in summer 2007 and on 21 May 2007 he signed by German club Arminia Bielefeld.

=== Arminia Bielefeld ===
Kampantais began his Bundesliga career with Arminia Bielefeld in 2007. On 30 June 2009, Bielefeld did not renew Kampantais's contract and so he was released.

=== Return to Greece ===
Kampantais began his Beta Ethniki career in Olympiacos Volos in summer 2009. After a year, he moved to Super League Greece, to play for OFI, and in June 2012 he signed a two-year contract with Panionios. On 10 September 2015, after a year as a free agent, he signed a year contract with Football League club Kerkyra for an undisclosed fee.
