= Vasilios Vallianos =

Greek footballer

Personal information
- Full name: Vasilios Vallianos
- Date of birth: 11 September 1988 (age 38)
- Place of birth: Agrinio, Greece
- Height: 1.74 m (5 ft 9 in)
- Position: Left-back

Youth career
- AEK Athens

Senior career*
Years	Team	Apps	(Gls)
2006–2008	AEK Athens	0	(0)
2007	→ Anagennisi Karditsa (loan)		
2007–2008	→ Nea Ionia (loan)		
2008–2010	Panachaiki		
2010–2011	FC St. Pauli II	12	(6)
2011–2013	VfB Lübeck	32	(2)
2013–2014	AO Chania	20	(0)
2014–2016	Enosis Neon Paralimni	26	(1)
2016–2017	OFI	20	(0)
2017–2018	Apollon Smyrnis	3	(0)
2018	Doxa Drama	10	(1)
2018–2020	Enosis Neon Paralimni	29	(2)
2020–2021	Ermis Aradippou	6	(0)
2021	ASIL Lysi	12	(1)
2021-2022	Anagennisi Deryneia	25	(2)
2022	Ermis Aradippou		
2023	Anagennisi Deryneia	6	(0)

International career
2006	Greece U19	3	(1)
- * Club domestic league appearances and goals as of 21:05, 2 November 2023 (UTC)

Vasilios Vallianos (Greek: Βασίλειος Βαλλιάνος; born 11 September 1988) is a Greek professional footballer who plays as a left-back.

== Honours ==
Enosis Neon Paralimni

- Cypriot Second Division: 2014–15
