= Martin Pautasso =

Argentine footballer

Martín Pautasso
Personal information
- Full name: Martín Albano Pautasso
- Date of birth: 17 May 1979 (age 47)
- Place of birth: Justiniano Posse, Argentina
- Height: 1.75 m (5 ft 9 in)
- Position: Defender

Senior career*
Years	Team	Apps	(Gls)
1998–2000	Banfield	35	(0)
2000–2005	Gimnasia y Esgrima (LP)	128	(3)
2005–2006	Independiente	21	(1)
2006–2007	AEK Athens	15	(1)
2008	Olimpia	?	(?)
2009–2010	Belgrano	35	(2)
2010–2012	Atlético Tucumán	28	(1)
2011–2012	→ Huracán (loan)	31	(1)
2012	Independiente Rivadavia	5	(0)
- * Club domestic league appearances and goals

Martín Albano Pautasso (born 17 May 1979, in Justiniano Posse, Córdoba) is an Argentine football player who usually plays as a full back.

Pautasso started his career at Argentine 2nd Division Banfield in 1998. Two years later he transferred to Club de Gimnasia y Esgrima La Plata in the Primera Division Argentina. In 2005, he moved to Club Atlético Independiente but was sold to AEK Athens after only one season in Avellaneda.

On 30 April 2007, Pautasso was released from AEK Athens as he did not manage to convince his manager Lorenzo Serra Ferrer of his ability. He played in 15 Greek Superleague games and scored 1 goal. He also played in 4 European matches, without scoring. Of the total 19 games that he played for AEK he was in the starting eleven 16 times.

Pautasso went on trial at Major League Soccer side FC Dallas in December 2007 and in January 2008, Pautasso signed a year contract with Olimpia of Asunción, Paraguay.
