= 2001–02 PAOK FC season =

PAOK
2001–02 season
- Chairman: Petros Kalafatis
- Manager: Dušan Bajević
- Stadium: Toumba Stadium
- Alpha Ethniki: 4th
- Greek Cup: Quarter-finals
- UEFA Cup: Third round
- Top goalscorer: League: Georgios Georgiadis (15); All: Georgios Georgiadis (17)
Home colours	Away colours

The 2001–02 season was PAOK Football Club's 76th in existence and the club's 43rd consecutive season in the top flight of Greek football. The team will enter the Greek Football Cup in the First round and will also enter in UEFA Cup starting from the First round.

== Players ==
=== Squad ===
Note: Flags indicate national team as defined under FIFA eligibility rules; some limited exceptions apply. Players may hold more than one non-FIFA nationality.

No.	Pos.	Nation	Player
15	GK	GRE	Vangelis Pourliotopoulos
16	GK	GRE	Apostolos Papadopoulos
33	GK	GRE	Kyriakos Tohouroglou
2	DF	GRE	Vasilios Borbokis
3	DF	GRE	Vangelis Koutsopoulos
4	DF	GRE	Anastasios Katsabis
5	DF	GRE	Georgios Koulakiotis
19	DF	GHA	Koffi Amponsah
21	DF	GRE	Vaggelis Nastos
23	DF	GRE	Dionysis Chasiotis
24	DF	NGR	Ifeanyi Udeze
25	DF	URU	Edgardo Adinolfi
26	DF	GRE	Petros Kanakoudis
27	DF	GRE	Georgios Chatzizisis
28	DF	SVK	Marian Zeman
31	DF	RUS	Omari Tetradze

No.	Pos.	Nation	Player
1	MF	GRE	Pantelis Kafes
6	MF	GRE	Dimitris Zavadias
14	MF	GRE	Giorgos Koutsis
20	MF	YUG	Sladan Spasic
22	MF	CMR	Guy Feutchine
30	MF	CYP	Panagiotis Engomitis
44	MF	GRE	Loukas Karadimos
99	MF	GRE	Pantelis Konstantinidis
8	FW	BRA	Luciano de Souza
9	FW	CYP	Ioannis Okkas
10	FW	GRE	Nikolaos Frousos
11	FW	GRE	Georgios Georgiadis
18	FW	CYP	Yiasoumis Yiasoumi
27	FW	CYP	Stefanos Voskaridis

== Transfers ==
Players transferred in

Transfer Window	Pos.	Name	Club	Fee
Summer	GK	(Greece) V. Pourliotopoulos	(Greece) Panionios	250k
Summer	DF	(Greece) V. Koutsopoulos	(Greece) Leonidio	100k
Summer	DF	(Greece) Georgios Chatzizisis	(Greece) Apollon Smyrnis	Free
Summer	MF	(Brazil) Luciano de Souza	(Greece) Olympiacos	Free
Summer	FW	(Cyprus) Yiasoumis Yiasoumi	(Cyprus) APOEL	Free
Summer	DF	(Greece) Vaggelis Nastos	(Greece) Kalamata	End of loan
Summer	DF	(Greece) Dimitrios Zavadias	(Greece) Athinaikos	End of loan
Summer	MF	(Greece) Fotis Kiskabanis	(Greece) AEL	End of loan
Summer	DF	(Greece) Petros Kanakoudis	(Greece) PAOK U20	
Winter	MF	(Greece) Giorgos Koutsis	(Greece) Aris	Free

Players transferred out

Transfer Window	Pos.	Name	Club	Fee
Summer	DF	(Greece) Stelios Venetidis	(Greece) Olympiacos	3.3M€
Summer	FW	(Greece) Dimitris Nalitzis	(Italy) Udinese	750k€
Summer	MF	(Greece) Dimitrios Orfanos	(Greece) Panserraikos	Free
Summer	MF	(Federal Republic of Yugoslavia) Vidak Bratić	(Federal Republic of Yugoslavia) Red Star	Free
Summer	DF	(Greece) Nikolaos Kolobourdas	(Greece) Iraklis	Free
Summer	DF	(Greece) Fotis Kiskabanis	(Greece) Olympiacos Volos	Loan
Summer	GK	(Australia) Ante Covic	(Croatia) Dinamo Zagreb	Free
Summer	MF	(Greece) Christos Karypidis	(Greece) Kavala	Loan
Winter	DF	(Georgia (country)) Omari Tetradze	(Russia) Spartak Vladikavkaz	Free

== Competitions ==
=== Overview ===
Competition	Record							
Competition	Pld	W	D	L	GF	GA	GD	Win %
Alpha Ethniki	26	14	6	6	55	45	+10	53.85
Greek Cup	10	7	1	2	21	12	+9	70.00
UEFA Cup	6	3	2	1	16	9	+7	50.00
Total	42	24	9	9	92	66	+26	57.14

Source: Competitions

== Alpha Ethniki ==
=== League table ===
Pos	Team	Pld	W	D	L	GF	GA	GD	Pts	Qualification or relegation
2	AEK Athens	26	19	1	6	65	28	+37	58 (Note: Head-to-head record: AEK Athens–Olympiacos 2–3, Olympiacos–AEK Athens 4–3.)	Qualification for Champions League third qualifying round
3	Panathinaikos	26	16	7	3	53	25	+28	55	Qualification for UEFA Cup first round
4	PAOK	26	14	6	6	55	45	+10	48	Qualification for UEFA Cup first round
5	Skoda Xanthi	26	12	6	8	34	26	+8	42	Qualification for UEFA Cup first round
6	Iraklis	26	9	9	8	32	35	−3	36	Qualification for UEFA Cup first round

Source: Galanis Sports Data
Rules for classification: 1st points; 2nd head-to-head points; 3rd head-to-head goal difference; 4th decision match.

==== Results summary ====
Overall								Home						Away					
Pld	W	D	L	GF	GA	GD	Pts	W	D	L	GF	GA	GD	W	D	L	GF	GA	GD
26	14	6	6	55	45	+10	48	10	3	0	33	16	+17	4	3	6	22	29	−7

Last updated: 8 May 2002.
Source: Competitive matches

==== Results by round ====
Round	1	2	3	4	5	6	7	8	9	10	11	12	13	14	15	16	17	18	19	20	21	22	23	24	25	26
Ground	H	A	H	H	A	H	A	H	A	H	A	A	H	A	H	A	A	H	A	H	A	H	A	H	H	A
Result	D	L	D	W	D	W	L	W	W	W	W	D	W	W	W	L	D	W	L	W	W	D	L	W	W	L
Position	8	11	11	8	9	5	8	6	5	4	3	3	3	3	2	4	5	4	4	4	4	4	4	4	4	4

Source: League matches
A = Away; H = Home; W = Win; D = Draw; L = Loss

==== Matches ====
Win Draw Loss

23 September 2001 1	PAOK	1–1	Aris	Thessaloniki
20:15 EET	Okkas 72'		Liolidis 67'	Stadium: Toumba Stadium

30 September 2001 2	Iraklis	3–1	PAOK	Thessaloniki
20:00 EET	Fofonka 63'; Koutsoures 69'; Kormaris 72'		Okkas 60'	Stadium: Kaftanzoglio Stadium

14 October 2001 3	PAOK	1–1	Olympiacos	Thessaloniki
19:00 EET	Spasic 64'		Giannakopoulos 55'	Stadium: Toumba Stadium

21 October 2001 4	PAOK	3–1	Panionios	Thessaloniki
18:45 EET	Borbokis 32'; Konstantinidis 57'; Okkas 85'		Mouzaoui 22'	Stadium: Toumba Stadium

4 November 2001 5	Ionikos	1–1	PAOK	Piraeus
16:00 EET	Tsakmakidis 18'		Kafes 44'	Stadium: Neapoli Stadium

18 November 2001 6	PAOK	3–1	Egaleo	Thessaloniki
16:00 EET	Okkas 44'; Yiasoumi 46'; Georgiadis 90+4' (pen.)		Nikolopoulos 1'	Stadium: Toumba Stadium

25 November 2001 7	Xanthi	1–0	PAOK	Xanthi
20:00 EET	Gager 89'			Stadium: Xanthi Ground

2 December 2001 8	PAOK	2–1	Ethnikos Asteras	Thessaloniki
16:00 EET	Basinas 43' (o.g.); Okkas 72'		Kontopoulos 34'	Stadium: Toumba Stadium

9 December 2001 9	Panathinaikos	1–2	PAOK	Athens
16:00 EET	Kolkka 7'		Okkas 69'; Pantelis Konstantinidis 84'	Stadium: Leoforos Alexandras Stadium

16 December 2001 10	PAOK	3–2	OFI	Thessaloniki
16:00 EET	Georgiadis (penalty missed) 13'; Konstantinidis 55'; Okkas 60'; Yiasoumi 67'		Adamos 5'; Soares 47'	Stadium: Toumba Stadium

13 January 2002 11	Akratitos	1–2	PAOK	Athens
16:00 EET	Semos 45'		Okkas 1'; Georgiadis 26'	Stadium: Yiannis Pathiakakis Stadium

20 January 2002 12	Panachaiki	3–3	PAOK	Patra
16:00 EET	Histilloles 65'; Borbokis 66' (o.g.); Cominges 75'		Yiasoumi 30'; Georgiadis 32', 57'	Stadium: Kostas Davourlis Stadium

27 January 2002 13	PAOK	3–2	AEK Athens	Thessaloniki
18:00 EET	Georgiadis 19'; Katsabis 41'; Okkas 75'		Nikolaidis 33'; Lakis 38'	Stadium: Toumba Stadium

2 February 2002 14	Aris	2–3	PAOK	Thessaloniki
18:00 EET	Charisteas 8'; Navas 90+3'		Yiasoumi 12'; Spasic 22', 59'	Stadium: Kleanthis Vikelidis Stadium

10 February 2002 15	PAOK	3–0	Iraklis	Thessaloniki
20:00 EET	Yiasoumi 38'; Okkas 84'; Kafes 90+3'			Stadium: Toumba Stadium

17 February 2002 16	Olympiacos	3–2	PAOK	Athens
20:00 EET	Giovanni 9'; Giannakopoulos 14'; Djordjevic 17'		Georgiadis 54', 58' (pen.)	Stadium: Olympic Stadium

24 February 2002 17	Panionios	1–1	PAOK	Nea Smyrni, Athens
16:00 EET	Mouzaoui 5'		Yiasoumi 15'	Stadium: Nea Smyrni Stadium

2 March 2002 18	PAOK	2–0	Ionikos	Thessaloniki
19:00 EET	Georgiadis 31' (pen.); Kafes 60'			Stadium: Toumba Stadium

10 March 2002 19	Egaleo	2–1	PAOK	Athens
18:00 EET	Papoutsis 57'; Chloros 88'		Georgiadis 45'	Stadium: Stavros Mavrothalassitis Stadium

17 March 2002 20	PAOK	1–0	Xanthi	Thessaloniki
20:00 EET	Spasic 44'			Stadium: Toumba Stadium

23 March 2002 21	Ethnikos Asteras	1–3	PAOK	Athens
18:30 EET	Berneanou 25'		Georgiadis 10', 28' (pen.); Borbokis 89'	Stadium: Michalis Kritikopoulos Stadium

31 March 2002 22	PAOK	2–2	Panathinaikos	Thessaloniki
19:00 EET	Spasic 23'; Frousos 51'		Karagounis 67'; Konstantinou 73'	Stadium: Toumba Stadium

7 April 2002 23	OFI	4–1	PAOK	Heraklion
16:15 EET	Stavrakakis 14'; Soares 28', 74'; Moschogiannis 71'		Georgiadis 23' (pen.)	Stadium: Theodoros Vardinogiannis Stadium

14 April 2002 24	PAOK	6–3	Akratitos	Thessaloniki
18:30 EET	Georgiadis 24', 61', 67' (pen.); Spasic 30', 33'; Engomitis 73'		Iliopoulos 22'; Ziakas 71' (pen.), 90+2'	Stadium: Toumba Stadium

21 April 2002 25	PAOK	3–2	Panachaiki	Thessaloniki
16:30 EET	Spasic 38'; Katsabis 41'; Kafes 89'		Kobayashi 74'; Gitsis 85'	Stadium: Toumba Stadium

8 May 2002 26	AEK Athens	6–2	PAOK	Athens
16:30 EET	Tsiartas 2'; Nikolaidis 24', 54'; Lakis 41'; Konstantinidis 63'; Ivić 90'		Georgiadis (penalty missed) 29'; Voskaridis 85', 89'	Stadium: Nikos Goumas Stadium

== Greek Cup ==
=== Group 8 ===
Pos	Team	Pld	W	D	L	GF	GA	GD	Pts	Qualification	PAOK	CHA	PNE	OLV
1	PAOK	6	5	1	0	16	6	+10	16	Second Round		4–1	2–2	5–2
2	Chalkidona	6	3	1	2	9	7	+2	10	Second Round	0–1		3–0	3–1
3	Panelefsiniakos	6	1	3	2	5	9	−4	6		0–2	1–1		1–0
4	Olympiacos Volos	6	0	1	5	5	13	−8	1		1–2	0–1	1–1	

Source: epo.gr

==== Matches ====
4 August 2001 Matchday 1	Olympiacos Volos	1–2	PAOK	Volos
13:00 EEST	Manda 81'	Report (page 21)	Okkas 34'; Kafes 44'	Stadium: Volos Municipal Stadium

13 August 2001 Matchday 2	Panelefsiniakos	0–2	PAOK	Elefsina
13:00 EEST		Report (page 22)	Spasić 7'; Luciano 65'	Stadium: Municipal Stadium of Eleusina

20 August 2001 Matchday 3	PAOK	4–1	Chalkidona	Thessaloniki
13:00 EEST	Kafes 14'; Georgiadis 37'; Okkas 59'; Luciano 65'	Report (page 22)	Athanasiadis 55'	Stadium: Toumba Stadium

26 August 2001 Matchday 4	PAOK	5–2	Olympiacos Volos	Thessaloniki
13:00 EEST	Yiasoumi 5', 78'; Engomitis 35'; Spasić 68'; Nastos 84'	Report (page 23)	Manda 22'; Pappas 22'	Stadium: Toumba Stadium

10 October 2001 Matchday 5	PAOK	2–2	Panelefsiniakos	Thessaloniki
13:00 EEST	Frousos 14'; Nastos 21'	Report (page 23)	Neofotistos 44'; Alexis 54'	Stadium: Municipal Stadium of Epanomi

8 November 2001 Matchday 6	Chalkidona	0–1	PAOK	Nikaia
13:00 EET		Report (page 24)	Koulakiotis 89'	Stadium: Pantelis Nikolaidis Stadium

=== Second round ===
bye

=== Third round ===
19 December 2001 1st leg	Chalkidona	0–3	PAOK	Nikaia
14:15 EET		Report (page 37)	Georgiadis 18'; Frousos 28'; Konstantinidis 69'	Stadium: Pantelis Nikolaidis Stadium

15 January 2002 2nd leg	PAOK	1–0 (4–0 agg.)	Chalkidona	Thessaloniki
16:00 EET	Kafes 28'	Report (page 38-39)		Stadium: Toumba Stadium

=== Quarter-finals ===
30 January 2002 1st leg	AEK Athens	2–1	PAOK	Nea Filadelfeia
19:00 EET	Tsiartas 36'; Maladenis 61'	Report (page 39)	Frousos 49'	Stadium: Nikos Goumas Stadium; Attendance: 6,310; Referee: Spyros Papadakos (Laconia)

6 February 2002 2nd leg	PAOK	0–4 (1–6 agg.)	AEK Athens	Thessaloniki
19:00 EET		Report (page 40)	Tsiartas 28' (pen.); Lakis 39'; Nikolaidis 48'; Ivić 89'	Stadium: Toumba Stadium; Attendance: 15,109; Referee: Giorgos Tsagarakis (Chania)

== UEFA Cup ==
=== First round ===
20 September 2001 1st leg	Kärnten (Austria)	0–0	(Greece) PAOK	Graz, Austria
20:30 CET		Report		Stadium: UPC-Arena; Referee: (Republic of Ireland) Paul McKeon

27 September 2001 2nd leg	PAOK (Greece)	4–0 (4–0 agg.)	(Austria) Kärnten	Thessaloniki, Greece
20:00 CET	Konstantinidis 24', 51'; Kafes 50'; Luciano 74'	Report		Stadium: Toumba Stadium; Referee: (Portugal) da Silva

=== Second round ===
18 October 2001 1st leg	PAOK (Greece)	6–1	(Czech Republic) Marila Příbram	Thessaloniki, Greece
20:00 CET	Yiasoumi 22', 27'; Okkas 37', 87'; Konstantinidis 50'; Luciano 75'	Report	Siegl 56'	Stadium: Toumba Stadium; Referee: (Spain) Victor Esquinas Torres

1 November 2001 2nd leg	Marila Příbram (Czech Republic)	2–2 (3–8 agg.)	(Greece) PAOK	Příbram, Czech Republic
14:00 CET	Čížek 36'; Kučera 61'	Report	Luciano 15'; Yiasoumi 61'	Stadium: Na Litavce; Referee: (Denmark) Nicolai Vollquartz

=== Third round ===
22 November 2001 1st leg	PAOK (Greece)	3–2	(Netherlands) PSV Eindhoven	Thessaloniki, Greece
18:30 CET	Yiasoumi 36', 69'; Udeze 44'	Report	de Jong 19'; Bruggink 81'	Stadium: Toumba Stadium; Referee: (France) Stéphane Bré

6 December 2001 2nd leg	PSV Eindhoven (Netherlands)	4–1 (6–4 agg.)	(Greece) PAOK	Eindhoven, Netherlands
19:30 CET	Vennegoor of Hesselink 2', 58'; Gakhokidze 33'; Van Bommel 90'	Report	Luciano 59'	Stadium: Philips Stadion; Referee: (Italy) Graziano Cesari

== Statistics ==
=== Squad statistics ===
As of 8 May 2002

Appearances denote players in the starting lineup, with the numbers in parentheses denoting appearances as substitute.

No.	Name	Alpha Ethniki		Greek Cup		UEFA Cup		Total	
No.	Name	Apps	Goals	Apps	Goals	Apps	Goals	Apps	Goals
Goalkeepers
15	(Greece) Vangelis Pourliotopoulos	11	0	6	0	0	0	17	0
16	(Greece) Apostolos Papadopoulos	0	0	1	0	0	0	1	0
33	(Greece) Kyriakos Tohouroglou	15	0	3	0	6	0	24	0
Defenders
2	(Greece) Vasilios Borbokis	19	2	1	0	4	0	24	2
3	(Greece) Vangelis Koutsopoulos	0	0	4 (2)	0	0	0	4 (2)	0
4	(Greece) Anastasios Katsabis	25	2	6	0	5	0	36	2
5	(Greece) Georgios Koulakiotis	10 (3)	0	9	1	3 (2)	0	22 (5)	1
19	(Ghana) Koffi Amponsah	16	0	6 (1)	0	4	0	26 (1)	0
21	(Greece) Vaggelis Nastos	18 (10)	0	7 (1)	2	2	0	27 (11)	2
23	(Greece) Dionysis Chasiotis	13 (3)	0	6 (3)	0	2	0	21 (6)	0
24	(Nigeria) Ifeanyi Udeze	14	0	2	0	5	1	21	1
25	(Uruguay) Edgardo Adinolfi	0	0	3	0	0	0	3	0
26	(Greece) Petros Kanakoudis	0	0	1	0	0	0	1	0
27	(Greece) Georgios Chatzizisis	0	0	3	0	0	0	3	0
28	(Slovakia) Marian Zeman	4 (2)	0	1 (1)	0	0	0	5 (3)	0
31	(Georgia (country)) Omari Tetradze	5 (1)	0	3	0	3 (1)	0	11 (2)	0
Midfielders
1	(Greece) Pantelis Kafes	23 (2)	4	7	3	6	1	36 (2)	8
6	(Greece) Dimitris Zavadias	7 (5)	0	7 (2)	0	1 (1)	0	15 (8)	0
8	(Brazil) Luciano de Souza	9 (4)	0	7 (2)	2	6 (1)	4	22 (7)	6
14	(Greece) Giorgos Koutsis	13 (1)	0	2 (1)	0	0	0	15 (2)	0
20	(Federal Republic of Yugoslavia) Sladan Spasic	20 (12)	8	8 (2)	2	2 (2)	0	30 (16)	10
22	(Cameroon) Guy Feutchine	8 (5)	0	3 (1)	0	5 (5)	0	16 (11)	0
30	(Cyprus) Panagiotis Engomitis	5	1	2	1	2	0	9	2
44	(Greece) Loukas Karadimos	12 (2)	0	8 (2)	0	1 (1)	0	21 (5)	0
99	(Greece) P. Konstantinidis	23	3	5	1	6	3	34	7
Forwards
7	(Cyprus) Stefanos Voskaridis	3 (3)	2	3 (2)	0	0	0	6 (5)	2
9	(Cyprus) Ioannis Okkas	25 (4)	10	7 (3)	2	6	2	38 (7)	14
10	(Greece) Nikolaos Frousos	17 (11)	1	6 (1)	3	2 (2)	0	25 (14)	4
11	(Greece) Georgios Georgiadis	25 (1)	15	5 (1)	2	6	0	36 (2)	17
18	(Cyprus) Yiasoumis Yiasoumi	21 (6)	6	5 (2)	2	6 (2)	5	32 (10)	13

Source: Match reports in competitive matches, uefa.com, epo.gr, rsssf.com

=== Goalscorers ===
Rank	No.	Pos.	Player	Alpha Ethniki	Greek Cup	UEFA Cup	Total
1	11	FW	(Greece) Georgios Georgiadis	15	2	0	17
2	9	FW	(Cyprus) Ioannis Okkas	10	2	2	14
3	18	FW	(Cyprus) Yiasoumis Yiasoumi	6	2	5	13
4	20	MF	(Federal Republic of Yugoslavia) Sladan Spasic	8	2	0	10
5	1	MF	(Greece) Pantelis Kafes	4	3	1	8
6	99	MF	(Greece) P. Konstantinidis	3	1	3	7
7	8	MF	(Brazil) Luciano de Souza	0	2	4	6
8	10	FW	(Greece) Nikolaos Frousos	1	3	0	4
9	7	FW	(Cyprus) Stefanos Voskaridis	2	0	0	2
10	4	DF	(Greece) Anastasios Katsabis	2	0	0	2
11	2	DF	(Greece) Vasilios Borbokis	2	0	0	2
12	30	MF	(Cyprus) Panagiotis Engomitis	1	1	0	2
13	21	DF	(Greece) Vaggelis Nastos	0	2	0	2
14	5	DF	(Greece) Georgios Koulakiotis	0	1	0	1
15	24	DF	(Nigeria) Ifeanyi Udeze	0	0	1	1
Own goals				1	0	0	1
TOTALS				55	21	16	92

Source: Match reports in competitive matches, uefa.com, epo.gr, rsssf.com
