= 2000–01 PAOK FC season =

PAOK
2000–01 season
- Chairman: Giorgos Batatoudis/Petros Kalafatis
- Manager: Dušan Bajević
- Alpha Ethniki: 4th
- Greek Cup: Winners
- UEFA Cup: Third round
- Top goalscorer: League: Dimitris Nalitzis (9); Nikolaos Frousos (9); All: Dimitris Nalitzis (19)
Home colours	Away colours

The 2000–01 season was PAOK Football Club’s 75th in existence and the club’s 43rd consecutive season in the top flight of Greek football. The team will enter the Greek Football Cup in the First round and will also enter in UEFA Cup starting from the First round.

== Players ==
=== Squad ===
Note: Flags indicate national team as defined under FIFA eligibility rules; some limited exceptions apply. Players may hold more than one non-FIFA nationality.

No.	Pos.	Nation	Player
16	GK	AUS	Ante Covic
26	GK	GRE	Apostolos Papadopoulos
33	GK	GRE	Kyriakos Tohouroglou
2	DF	GRE	Vasilios Borbokis
3	DF	GRE	Stelios Venetidis
4	DF	GRE	Anastasios Katsabis
6	DF	YUG	Vidak Bratić
19	DF	GHA	Koffi Amponsah
23	DF	GRE	Dionysis Chasiotis
24	DF	NGR	Ifeanyi Udeze
25	DF	GRE	Georgios Koulakiotis
31	DF	RUS	Omari Tetradze
55	DF	GRE	Christos Karypidis

No.	Pos.	Nation	Player
8	MF	YUG	Sladan Spasic
11	MF	GRE	Pantelis Konstantinidis
14	MF	GRE	Loukas Karadimos
28	MF	GRE	Pantelis Kafes
30	MF	CYP	Panagiotis Engomitis
35	DF	GRE	Dimitrios Orfanos
42	MF	CMR	Guy Feutchine
9	FW	CYP	Ioannis Okkas
10	FW	ARG	Patricio Camps
18	FW	GRE	Nikolaos Frousos
20	FW	GRE	Dimitris Nalitzis
21	FW	GRE	Georgios Georgiadis
7	FW	CYP	Stefanos Voskaridis

== Transfers ==
Players transferred in

Transfer Window	Pos.	Name	Club	Fee
Summer	MF	(Greece) Dimitrios Zavadias	(Greece) Kavala	End of loan
Summer	DF	(Greece) Vaggelis Nastos	(Greece) AEL	End of loan
Summer	GK	(Australia) Ante Covic	(Greece) Kavala	End of loan
Summer	FW	(Greece) Dimitris Salpingidis	(Greece) AEL	End of loan
Summer	FW	(Argentina) Patricio Camps	(Argentina) Vélez Sarsfield	1.85M€
Summer	MF	(Federal Republic of Yugoslavia) Slađan Spasić	(Federal Republic of Yugoslavia) Železnik	300k€
Summer	DF	(Nigeria) Ifeanyi Udeze	(Greece) Kavala	100k€
Summer	GK	(Greece) Kyriakos Tohouroglou	(Greece) Olympiacos	Free
Summer	MF	(Cyprus) Panagiotis Engomitis	(Cyprus) Anorthosis	900k€
Summer	FW	(Cyprus) Ioannis Okkas	(Cyprus) Anorthosis	900k€
Summer	DF	(Greece) Christos Karypidis	(Greece) PAOK U20	
Summer	MF	(Greece) Dimitrios Orfanos	(Greece) PAOK U20	
Winter	MF	(Cameroon) Guy Feutchine	(Greece) PAS Giannina	100k€

Players transferred out

Transfer Window	Pos.	Name	Club	Fee
Summer	FW	(Greece) Zisis Vryzas	(Italy) Perugia	1.5M€
Summer	GK	(Poland) Grzegorz Szamotulski	(Poland) Śląsk Wrocław	100k€
Summer	DF	(Greece) Vaggelis Nastos	(Greece) Kalamata	Loan
Summer	MF	(Greece) Dimitrios Zavadias	(Greece) Athinaikos	Loan
Summer	GK	(Greece) N. Anastasopoulos	(Greece) Xanthi	Free
Summer	DF	(Federal Republic of Yugoslavia) Božidar Bandović	(Greece) Paniliakos	Free
Summer	GK	(Greece) Nikolaos Michopoulos	(England) Burnley	Free
Summer	MF	(Greece) Spiros Marangos	(Cyprus) APOEL	Free
Summer	MF	(Greece) Kostas Frantzeskos	(Greece) Kalamata	Free
Summer	MF	(Liberia) Joe Nagbe	(Greece) Panionios	Free
Winter	FW	(Argentina) Patricio Camps	(Argentina) Vélez Sarsfield	Free
Winter	MF	(Greece) Dimitris Salpingidis	(Greece) Kavala	Loan
Winter	DF	(Argentina) Christian Dollberg	(Argentina) Defensores de Belgrano	Free

== Competitions ==
=== Overview ===
Competition	Record							
Competition	Pld	W	D	L	GF	GA	GD	Win %
Alpha Ethniki	30	14	9	7	66	48	+18	46.67
Greek Cup	17	14	2	1	51	17	+34	82.35
UEFA Cup	6	2	1	3	9	9	+0	33.33
Total	53	30	12	11	126	74	+52	56.60

Source: Competitions

== Alpha Ethniki ==
=== League table ===
Pos	Team	Pld	W	D	L	GF	GA	GD	Pts	Qualification or relegation
2	Panathinaikos	30	20	6	4	61	20	+41	66	Qualification for Champions League third qualifying round
3	AEK Athens	30	19	4	7	61	34	+27	61	Qualification for UEFA Cup qualifying round
4	PAOK	30	14	9	7	66	48	+18	51	Qualification for UEFA Cup first round (Note: PAOK were qualified for first round of the 2001–02 UEFA Cup as Greek Football Cup winners.)
5	Iraklis	30	14	4	12	45	40	+5	46	
6	Ionikos	30	12	8	10	46	46	0	44 (Note: Head-to-head points: Ionikos 4, Aris 1.)	

Source: Galanis Sports Data
Rules for classification: 1) Points; 2) Head-to-head points; 3) Head-to-head goal difference; 4) Goal difference; 5) Goals scored; 6) Goals against; 7) Play-offs (neutral ground); 8) Draw.
(Note: Criterion 7 is only used if needed to decide champion, teams for relegation or teams for UEFA competitions).

==== Results summary ====
Overall								Home						Away					
Pld	W	D	L	GF	GA	GD	Pts	W	D	L	GF	GA	GD	W	D	L	GF	GA	GD
30	14	9	7	66	48	+18	51	10	2	3	43	22	+21	4	7	4	23	26	−3

Last updated: 27 May 2001.
Source: Competitive matches

==== Results by round ====
Round	1	2	3	4	5	6	7	8	9	10	11	12	13	14	15	16	17	18	19	20	21	22	23	24	25	26	27	28	29	30
Ground	A	A	H	A	H	A	H	H	A	H	A	H	A	H	A	H	H	A	H	A	H	A	A	H	A	H	A	H	A	H
Result	D	W	D	L	W	D	D	L	W	W	W	W	D	W	W	W	L	D	W	D	W	L	L	W	D	W	D	L	L	W
Position	10	5	5	8	6	9	9	9	9	7	6	5	4	4	3	3	4	4	4	4	3	4	4	4	4	4	4	4	4	4

Source: League matches
A = Away; H = Home; W = Win; D = Draw; L = Loss

==== Matches ====
Win Draw Loss

17 September 2000 1	Kalamata	0–0	PAOK	Kalamata
21:15 EET				Stadium: Kalamata Metropolitan Stadium; Attendance: 2,388; Referee: Borovilos (Arcadia)

24 September 2000 2	PAS Giannina	1–3	PAOK	Patras
19:30 EET	Tsalikis 5'		Amponsah 24'; Okkas 38'; Tetradze 87'	Stadium: Kostas Davourlis Stadium; Attendance: 2,238; Referee: Dovas (Athens)

2 October 2000 3	PAOK	1–1	Panionios	Thessaloniki
19:00 EET	Tetradze 19'		Chasiotis 67'	Stadium: Toumba Stadium; Attendance: 6,455; Referee: Borovilos (Arcadia)

1 November 2000 4	Aris	4–0	PAOK	Thessaloniki
17:00 EET	Kyparissis 39'; Koutsis 45+1'; Koltsidas 49'; Charisteas 71'		Udeze (red card) 43'	Stadium: Kleanthis Vikelidis Stadium; Attendance: 12,890; Referee: Kasnaferis (Athens)

5 November 2000 5	PAOK	4–1	OFI	Thessaloniki
17:00 EET	Frousos 31' (pen.); Okkas 39'; Nalitzis 88'; Engomitis 90'		Mauro 71'	Stadium: Toumba Stadium; Attendance: 6,491; Referee: Papapanayiotou (Piraeus)

12 November 2000 6	Paniliakos	1–1	PAOK	Pyrgos, Elis
17:00 EET	Mandra 28' (pen.)		Venetidis 72'	Stadium: Pirgos Municipal Stadium; Attendance: 1,149; Referee: Finokaliotis (Athens)

18 November 2000 7	PAOK	2–2	Panathinaikos	Thessaloniki
19:00 EET	Nalitzis 11'; Karadimos 25'		Vlaović 57'; Sypniewski 78'	Stadium: Toumba Stadium; Attendance: 12,978; Referee: Nikou (Imathia)

27 November 2000 8	PAOK	2–4	Olympiacos	Thessaloniki
18:00 EET	Georgiadis (yellow card) 11' (yellow-red card) 39'; Nalitzis 56'; Frousos 68'		Georgatos 32'; Alexandris 66'; Đorđević 75', 90+3'	Stadium: Toumba Stadium; Attendance: 5,723; Referee: Kasnaferis (Athens)

3 December 2000 9	Xanthi	0–2	PAOK	Xanthi
17:00 EET			Okkas 68'; Frousos 81'	Stadium: Xanthi Ground; Attendance: 3,666; Referee: Papilias (Piraeus)

10 December 2000 10	PAOK	4–2	Iraklis	Thessaloniki
19:00 EET	Katsabis 10'; Frousos 45+3' (pen.); Kafes 48'; Konstantinidis 51'		Sapountzis 28'; Konstantinou 60'	Stadium: Toumba Stadium; Attendance: 6,492; Referee: Borovilos (Arcadia)

17 December 2000 11	Athinaikos	3–4	PAOK	Athens
17:00 EET	Buyse 8' (pen.); Papandreou 76' (pen.), 87'		Konstantinidis 4', 6'; Frousos 40' (pen.); Okkas 83'	Stadium: Vyronas National Stadium; Attendance: 1,038; Referee: Nikou (Imathia)

4 January 2001 12	PAOK	2–1	Ethnikos Asteras	Thessaloniki
16:00 EET	Frousos 9'; Georgiadis 50'		Kontopoulos 85'	Stadium: Toumba Stadium; Attendance: Closed doors Referee: Papilias (Piraeus)

8 January 2001 13	Ionikos	2–2	PAOK	Piraeus
18:00 EET	Afash 63'; Curbelo 70' (pen.)		Georgiadis 2'; Kafes 24'	Stadium: Neapoli Stadium; Attendance: 1,244; Referee: Borovilos (Arcadia)

14 January 2001 14	PAOK	2–1	AEK Athens	Thessaloniki
19:00 EET	Frousos 50', 80' (pen.)		Ruiz 36'	Stadium: Toumba Stadium; Attendance: 7,038; Referee: Papadakos (Laconia)

21 January 2001 15	Panachaiki	1–2	PAOK	Patras
19:00 EET	Solakis 62'		Konstantinidis 39'; Spasić 90+2'	Stadium: Kostas Davourlis Stadium; Attendance: 1,303; Referee: Papilias (Piraeus)

28 January 2001 16	PAOK	7–1	Kalamata	Thessaloniki
17:00 EET	Spasić 3'; Okkas 14'; Konstantinidis 30'; Koulakiotis 67'; Nalitzis 72', 83'; Engomitis 90+2'		Frantzeskos 62'	Stadium: Toumba Stadium; Attendance: 5,786; Referee: Tsigras (Athens)

4 February 2001 17	PAOK	2–3	PAS Giannina	Thessaloniki
17:00 EET	Kafes 30'; Spasić 57'		Élder 25' (pen.); Bletsas 51'; Kormaris 62'	Stadium: Toumba Stadium; Attendance: 7,065; Referee: Trikalis (Trikala)

12 February 2001 18	Panionios	1–1	PAOK	Nea Smyrni, Athens
17:00 EET	Efthimiadis 90'		Okkas 24'	Stadium: Nea Smyrni Stadium; Attendance: 1,189; Referee: Tsagarakis (Chania)

17 February 2001 19	PAOK	2–0	Aris	Thessaloniki
19:00 EET	Engomitis 37'; Okkas 83'			Stadium: Toumba Stadium; Attendance: 11,969; Referee: Kasnaferis (Athens)

25 February 2001 20	OFI	0–0	PAOK	Heraklion
15:00 EET				Stadium: Theodoros Vardinogiannis Stadium; Attendance: 2,134; Referee: Voulgaris (Piraeus)

4 March 2001 21	PAOK	3–2	Paniliakos	Thessaloniki
16:00 EET	Frousos 5'; Nalitzis 56'; Georgiadis 86'		Sapanis 50', 65'	Stadium: Toumba Stadium; Attendance: 4,128; Referee: Papapanayiotou (Piraeus)

10 March 2001 22	Panathinaikos	5–2	PAOK	Athens
19:00 EET	Warzycha 12'; Pflipsen 43' (pen.); Olisadebe 55'; Basinas 68'; Vlaović 78'		Georgiadis 45+2' (pen.); Nalitzis 85'	Stadium: Leoforos Alexandras Stadium; Attendance: 9,914; Referee: Tsagarakis (Chania)

17 March 2001 23	Olympiacos	1–0	PAOK	Athens
19:00 EET	Anatolakis 34'			Stadium: Olympic Stadium (Athens); Attendance: 12,925; Referee: Chelis (Kavala)

1 April 2001 24	PAOK	3–0	Xanthi	Thessaloniki
17:00 EET	Spasić 44'; Georgiadis 53'; Engomitis 60'			Stadium: Toumba Stadium; Attendance: 1,436; Referee: Tsigras (Athens)

8 April 2001 25	Iraklis	1–1	PAOK	Thessaloniki
19:00 EET	Konstantinou 16'		Georgiadis 69'	Stadium: Kaftanzoglio Stadium; Attendance: 11,752; Referee: Tsagarakis (Chania)

22 April 2001 26	PAOK	3–1	Athinaikos	Thessaloniki
17:30 EET	Georgiadis 11'; Spasić 61'; Kafes 69'		Buyse 17' (pen.)	Stadium: Toumba Stadium; Attendance: 1,403; Referee: Papilias (Piraeus)

29 April 2001 27	Ethnikos Asteras	3–3	PAOK	Athens
17:30 EET	Lagos 21', 62'; Segos 50'		Konstantinidis 12'; Nalitzis 34'; Katsabis 70'	Stadium: Michalis Kritikopoulos Stadium; Attendance: 2,250; Referee: Borovilos (Arcadia)

6 May 2001 28	PAOK	1–2	Ionikos	Thessaloniki
19:30 EET	Amponsah 47'		Curbelo 7', 45' (pen.)	Stadium: Toumba Stadium; Attendance: 1,492; Referee: Dovas (Athens)

19 May 2001 29	AEK Athens	3–2	PAOK	Athens
19:00 EET	Tsiartas 13' (pen.); Nikolaidis 26'; Konstantinidis 65'		Borbokis 35'; Spasić 43'	Stadium: Nikos Goumas Stadium; Attendance: 6,070; Referee: Chelis (Kavala)

27 May 2001 30	PAOK	5–1	Panachaiki	Thessaloniki
17:30 EET	Georgiadis 14' (pen.); Okkas 63'; Nalitzis 74'; Borbokis 80'; Engomitis 82'		Papadopoulos 77'	Stadium: Toumba Stadium; Attendance: 7,018; Referee: Briakos (Epirus)

== Greek Cup ==
=== Group 4 ===
Pos	Team	Pld	W	D	L	GF	GA	GD	Pts	Qualification	PAOK	PNC	KAV	ATR	NAF	AMP
1	PAOK	10	9	1	0	35	10	+25	28	Round of 16		2–0	3–1	1–0	4–0	6–1
2	Panachaiki	10	5	2	3	28	16	+12	17	Round of 16	2–3		4–1	1–2	2–2	6–0
3	Kavala	10	4	2	4	17	22	−5	14		1–5	2–6		3–1	1–0	4–0
4	Atromitos	10	3	2	5	15	17	−2	11		1–2	0–2	1–1		2–0	4–0
5	Nafpaktiakos Asteras	10	2	4	4	15	18	−3	10		3–3	2–2	1–1	5–2		0–1
6	A.S. Ampelokipoi	10	1	1	8	6	33	−27	4		1–6	1–2	1–2	1–1	0–2	

Source: epo.gr

==== Matches ====
7 August 2000 Matchday 1	PAOK	1–0	Atromitos	Thessaloniki
20:30 EEST	Frousos 80'	Report (page 18)		Stadium: Kalamaria Stadium; Attendance: 4,552; Referee: Makis Efthimiadis (Drama)

10 August 2000 Matchday 2	A.S. Ampelokipoi	1–6	PAOK	Thessaloniki
21:00 EEST	Miskos 50'	Report (page 19)	Camps 2', 45'; Amponsah 10'; Nalitzis 24'; Georgiadis 40' (pen.); Okkas 78'	Stadium: Kalamaria Stadium; Attendance: 1,576; Referee: Giorgos Fasolis (Athens)

13 August 2000 Matchday 3	Kavala	1–5	PAOK	Kavala
19:00 EEST	Katsabis 37' (o.g.)	Report (page 19)	Angos 9' (o.g.); Camps 34'; Katsabis 60'; Frousos 74', 90'	Stadium: Anthi Karagianni Stadium; Attendance: 1,797; Referee: Filippos Dovas (Phthiotis)

20 August 2000 Matchday 4	PAOK	2–0	Panachaiki	Thessaloniki
21:30 EEST	Okkas 3'; Vryzas 87'	Report (page 20)		Stadium: Kalamaria Stadium; Attendance: 3,616; Referee: Giorgos Borovilos (Arcadia)

23 August 2000 Matchday 5	Nafpaktiakos Asteras	3–3	PAOK	Nafpaktos
18:00 EEST	Loukopoulos 39'; Samlidis 64'; Kyparissis 81'	Report (page 21)	Spasić 6'; Nalitzis 60', 78'	Stadium: Papacharalambeio National Stadium; Attendance: 1,430; Referee: Stavros Flotsios (Boeotia)

26 August 2000 Matchday 6	Atromitos	1–2	PAOK	Piraeus
19:30 EEST	Vahirua 56'	Report (page 21)	Nalitzis 11', 81' (pen.)	Stadium: Nikaia Municipal Gymnasium; Attendance: 341; Referee: Theofilaktos Papapanagiotou (Piraeus)

4 September 2000 Matchday 7	PAOK	6–1	A.S. Ampelokipoi	Epanomi
17:00 EEST	Bratić 1', 39'; Spasić 26', 34'; Nalitzis 43'; Kafes 58'	Report (page 21-22)	Radoiković 53'	Stadium: Epanomi Municipal Stadium; Attendance: 570; Referee: Kyros Vassaras (Macedonia)

29 November 2000 Matchday 8	PAOK	3–1	Kavala	Thessaloniki
17:00 EET	Frousos 4', 70'; Orfanos 49'	Report (page 22)	Athanasiadis 73'	Stadium: Toumba Stadium; Attendance: 164; Referee: Manolis Giannadakis (Lasithi)
Note: The referee Giannadakis was replaced at the 27th minute by Zografos.

5 October 2000 Matchday 9	Panachaiki	2–3	PAOK	Patras
20:45 EEST	Natrosvili 16'; Vukčević 76'	Report (page 23)	Katsabis 31'; Camps 38' (pen.); Spasić 89'	Stadium: Kostas Davourlis Stadium; Referee: Manolis Giannadakis (Lasithi)

8 October 2000 Matchday 10	PAOK	4–0	Nafpaktiakos Asteras	Thessaloniki
16:00 EEST	Frousos 32', 73', 80'; Camps 47'	Report (page 23)		Stadium: Toumba Stadium; Attendance: 337; Referee: Vangelis Tsigras (Athens)

=== Second round ===
17 January 2001 1st leg	Aris	1–1	PAOK	Thessaloniki
20:00 EET	Katsiaros 37'	Report	Engomitis 41'	Stadium: Kleanthis Vikelidis Stadium; Attendance: 9,325; Referee: Chelis (Kavala)

31 January 2001 2nd leg	PAOK	2–0 (3–1 agg.)	Aris	Thessaloniki
20:00 EET	Koulakiotis 45+2'; Konstantinidis 82'	Report		Stadium: Toumba Stadium; Attendance: 18,564; Referee: Daglis (Macedonia)

=== Quarter-finals ===
21 February 2001 1st leg	PAOK	2–0	Xanthi	Thessaloniki
20:00 EET	Konstantinidis 26'; Georgiadis 52'	Report		Stadium: Toumba Stadium; Attendance: 7,168; Referee: Efthimiadis (Drama)

7 March 2001 2nd leg	Xanthi	1–2 (1–4 agg.)	PAOK	Xanthi
20:00 EET	Zapropoulos 65'	Report	Udeze 21'; Georgiadis 71'	Stadium: Xanthi Ground; Attendance: 2,246; Referee: Vallianos (Aetoloacarnania)

=== Semi-finals ===
4 April 2001 1st leg	PAOK	5–2	Apollon Athens	Thessaloniki
17:00 EEST	Georgiadis 22' (pen.), 83'; Amponsah 33'; Nalitzis 73'; Kafes 87'	Report	Chatzis 54'; Skarmoutsos 85'	Stadium: Toumba Stadium; Attendance: 9,263; Referee: Efthimiadis (Drama)

11 April 2001 2nd leg	Apollon Athens	1–0 (3–5 agg.)	PAOK	Athens
16:00 EEST	Papadimitriou 13'	Report		Stadium: Georgios Kamaras Stadium; Attendance: 640; Referee: Briakos (Epirus)

=== Final ===
12 May 2001	Olympiacos	2–4	PAOK	Athens
21:00 EEST	Anatolakis (yellow card) 36'; Georgatos (yellow card) 69'; Đorđević 78' (pen.); Choutos 90+2'		Engomitis 4' (yellow card) 29'; Borbokis 31'; Georgiadis 46'; Venetidis (yellow card) 51'; Okkas (yellow card) 62'; Nalitzis 85'; Udeze (yellow card) 88'	Stadium: Nikos Goumas Stadium; Attendance: 13,300; Referee: Giorgos Kasnaferis (Athens); Man of the Match: Panagiotis Engomitis

== UEFA Cup ==
=== First round ===
14 September 2000 1st leg	PAOK (Greece)	3–1	(Israel) Beitar Jerusalem	Thessaloniki, Greece
20:00 CET	Camps 45'; Cohen 49' (o.g.); Nalitzis 55'	Report	Hamar 39'	Stadium: Toumba Stadium; Attendance: 17,584; Referee: Fiorenzo Treossi (Italy)

28 September 2000 2nd leg	Beitar Jerusalem (Israel)	3–3 (4–6 agg.)	(Greece) PAOK	Jerusalem, Israel
17:45 CET	Sivilia 45', 61'; Abukasis 54' (pen.)	Report	Katsabis 16'; Nalitzis 43'; Konstantinidis 90'	Stadium: Teddy Stadium; Attendance: 9,600; Referee: Attila Juhos (Hungary)

=== Second round ===
24 October 2000 1st leg	Udinese (Italy)	1–0	(Greece) PAOK	Udine, Italy
16:00 CET	Margiotta 90+4'	Report		Stadium: Stadio Friuli; Attendance: 14,258; Referee: Juan Ansuátegui Roca (Spain)

9 November 2000 2nd leg	PAOK (Greece)	3–0 (a.e.t.) (3–1 agg.)	(Italy) Udinese	Thessaloniki, Greece
18:00 CET	Camps 73', 102'; Frousos 108'	Report		Stadium: Toumba Stadium; Attendance: 24,324; Referee: Lutz-Michael Fröhlich (Germany)

=== Third round ===
23 November 2000 1st leg	PSV Eindhoven (Netherlands)	3–0	(Greece) PAOK	Eindhoven, Netherlands
19:30 CET	Bruggink 5'; Kežman 15', 44'	Report		Stadium: Philips Stadion; Attendance: 28,000; Referee: Alfredo Trentalange (Italy)

7 December 2000 2nd leg	PAOK (Greece)	0–1 (0–4 agg.)	(Netherlands) PSV Eindhoven	Thessaloniki, Greece
20:15 CET		Report	Bruggink 43'	Stadium: Toumba Stadium; Attendance: 12,691; Referee: Stuart Dougal (Scotland)

== Statistics ==
=== Squad statistics ===
As of 27 May 2001

Appearances denote players in the starting lineup, with the numbers in parentheses denoting appearances as substitute.

No.	Name	Alpha Ethniki		Greek Cup		UEFA Cup		Total	
No.	Name	Apps	Goals	Apps	Goals	Apps	Goals	Apps	Goals
Goalkeepers
1	(Poland) Grzegorz Szamotulski	0	0	6	0	0	0	6	0
16	(Australia) Ante Covic	4 (1)	0	1	0	0	0	5 (1)	0
26	(Greece) Apostolos Papadopoulos	0	0	1 (1)	0	0	0	1 (1)	0
33	(Greece) Kyriakos Tohouroglou	27	0	10	0	6	0	43	0
Defenders
2	(Greece) Vasilios Borbokis	13 (1)	2	8 (1)	1	5	0	26 (2)	3
3	(Greece) Stelios Venetidis	28	1	12	0	6	0	46	1
4	(Greece) Anastasios Katsabis	23 (1)	2	14 (2)	3	4 (1)	1	41 (4)	6
6	(Federal Republic of Yugoslavia) Vidak Bratić	14 (3)	0	11 (2)	2	4 (1)	0	29 (6)	2
19	(Ghana) Koffi Amponsah	18	2	10 (2)	2	4	0	32 (2)	4
23	(Greece) Dionysis Chasiotis	13 (4)	0	11 (3)	0	2 (1)	0	26 (8)	0
24	(Nigeria) Ifeanyi Udeze	16	0	15 (1)	1	6	0	37 (1)	1
25	(Greece) Georgios Koulakiotis	21 (8)	1	10 (5)	1	2	0	33 (13)	2
31	(Georgia (country)) Omari Tetradze	22 (2)	2	6	0	5	0	33 (2)	2
	(Greece) Christos Karypidis	0	0	1 (1)	0	0	0	1 (1)	0
Midfielders
7	(Greece) Spiros Marangos	0	0	3 (3)	0	0	0	3 (3)	0
8	(Federal Republic of Yugoslavia) Sladan Spasic	23 (13)	6	12 (4)	4	2 (2)	0	37 (19)	10
11	(Greece) P. Konstantinidis	28 (2)	6	13 (2)	2	5	1	46 (4)	9
14	(Greece) Loukas Karadimos	9 (5)	1	11 (7)	0	1 (1)	0	21 (13)	1
28	(Greece) Pantelis Kafes	27 (6)	4	12 (3)	2	6 (6)	0	45 (15)	6
30	(Cyprus) Panagiotis Engomitis	15 (1)	5	11 (1)	2	3 (1)	0	29 (3)	7
35	(Greece) Dimitrios Orfanos	2 (2)	0	1 (1)	1	0	0	3 (3)	1
42	(Cameroon) Guy Feutchine	3 (2)	0	0	0	0	0	3 (2)	0
Forwards
10	(Argentina) Patricio Camps	9 (1)	0	7	5	6 (1)	3	22 (2)	8
18	(Greece) Nikolaos Frousos	19 (8)	9	11 (5)	8	2 (2)	1	32 (15)	18
20	(Greece) Dimitris Nalitzis	28 (15)	9	11 (3)	8	6	2	45 (18)	19
21	(Greece) Georgios Georgiadis	26 (5)	8	11 (3)	6	2 (1)	0	39 (9)	14
22	(Cyprus) Ioannis Okkas	26 (4)	8	13 (6)	2	6 (1)	0	45 (11)	10
27	(Cyprus) Stefanos Voskaridis	4 (4)	0	7 (1)	0	1 (1)	0	12 (6)	0
34	(Greece) Dimitris Salpingidis	0	0	2 (2)	0	0	0	2 (2)	0
	(Greece) Zisis Vryzas	0	0	6 (4)	1	0	0	6 (4)	1

Source: Match reports in competitive matches, uefa.com, epo.gr, RSSSF

=== Goalscorers ===
Rank	No.	Pos.	Player	Alpha Ethniki	Greek Cup	UEFA Cup	Total
1	20	FW	(Greece) Dimitris Nalitzis	9	8	2	19
2	18	FW	(Greece) Nikolaos Frousos	9	8	1	18
3	21	FW	(Greece) Georgios Georgiadis	8	6	0	14
4	22	FW	(Cyprus) Ioannis Okkas	8	2	0	10
5	8	MF	(Federal Republic of Yugoslavia) Sladan Spasic	6	4	0	10
6	11	MF	(Greece) P. Konstantinidis	6	2	1	9
7	10	FW	(Argentina) Patricio Camps	0	5	3	8
8	30	MF	(Cyprus) Panagiotis Engomitis	5	2	0	7
9	28	MF	(Greece) Pantelis Kafes	4	2	0	6
10	4	DF	(Greece) Anastasios Katsabis	2	3	1	6
11	19	DF	(Ghana) Koffi Amponsah	2	2	0	4
12	2	DF	(Greece) Vasilios Borbokis	2	1	0	3
13	31	DF	(Georgia (country)) Omari Tetradze	2	0	0	2
14	25	DF	(Greece) Georgios Koulakiotis	1	1	0	2
15	6	DF	(Federal Republic of Yugoslavia) Vidak Bratić	0	2	0	2
16	14	MF	(Greece) Loukas Karadimos	1	0	0	1
17	3	DF	(Greece) Stelios Venetidis	1	0	0	1
18	9	FW	(Greece) Zisis Vryzas	0	1	0	1
19	35	MF	(Greece) Dimitrios Orfanos	0	1	0	1
20	24	DF	(Nigeria) Ifeanyi Udeze	0	1	0	1
Own goals				0	0	1	1
TOTALS				66	51	9	126

Source: Match reports in competitive matches, uefa.com, epo.gr, RSSSF
