= 2005–06 PAOK FC season =

PAOK
2005–06 season
- Chairman: Giannis Goumenos
- Manager: Nikos Karageorgiou, Georgios Kostikos, Ilie Dumitrescu
- Stadium: Toumba Stadium
- Alpha Ethniki: 6th
- Greek Cup: Fourth round
- UEFA Cup: Group stage
- Top goalscorer: League: Dimitris Salpingidis (17); All: Dimitris Salpingidis (20)
Home colours	Away colours

The 2005–06 season was PAOK Football Club's 80th in existence and the club's 47th consecutive season in the top flight of Greek football. The team will enter the Greek Football Cup in the Fourth round and will also enter in 2005–06 UEFA Cup starting from the 1st Round.

== Players ==
=== Squad ===
Note: Flags indicate national team as defined under FIFA eligibility rules; some limited exceptions apply. Players may hold more than one non-FIFA nationality.

No.	Pos.	Nation	Player
1	GK	POR	Daniel Fernandes
33	GK	GRE	Kyriakos Tohouroglou
40	GK	GRE	Dimitris Kyriakidis
2	DF	TUR	Fatih Akyel
3	DF	GRE	Vangelis Koutsopoulos
4	DF	GRE	Christos Karipidis
6	DF	GRE	Paraskevas Andralas
13	DF	GRE	Stelios Malezas
19	DF	GRE	Petros Konteon
23	DF	GRE	Dionysis Chasiotis
24	DF	NGR	Ifeanyi Udeze
37	DF	GRE	Nikos Arabatzis
44	DF	CYP	Elias Charalambous
45	DF	GRE	Christos Melissis
5	MF	GRE	Christos Maladenis
7	MF	GRE	Theodoros Zagorakis

No.	Pos.	Nation	Player
8	MF	GRE	Dimitrios Zografakis
10	MF	EGY	Shikabala
18	MF	GRE	Lambros Vangelis
22	MF	CMR	Guy Feutchine
25	MF	GRE	Sotiris Balafas
27	MF	GRE	Chousein Moumin
28	MF	GRE	Stelios Iliadis
30	MF	CYP	Panagiotis Engomitis
31	MF	GRE	Pantelis Konstantinidis
77	MF	EGY	Amir Azmy
9	FW	GRE	Dimitris Salpingidis
11	FW	CYP	Yiasoumis Yiasoumi
20	FW	POL	Marcin Mieciel
29	FW	GRE	Lazaros Christodoulopoulos

== Transfers ==
Players transferred in

Transfer window	Pos.	Name	Club	Fee
Summer	DF	(Greece) Petros Konteon	(Greece) Niki Volos	End of loan
Summer	DF	(Greece) Stelios Malezas	(Greece) Irodotos	End of loan
Summer	MF	(Greece) Stelios Iliadis	(Greece) Apollon Kalamarias	250k
Summer	FW	(Serbia and Montenegro) Vladimir Karalic	(Bosnia and Herzegovina) Borac Banja Luka	150k
Summer	MF	(Greece) Sotiris Balafas	(Greece) Anagennisi Arta	80K
Summer	DF	(Cyprus) Elias Charalambous	(Cyprus) Omonia	Free
Summer	DF	(Greece) P. Konstantinidis	(Greece) Panathinaikos	Free
Summer	MF	(Greece) Theodoros Zagorakis	(Italy) Bologna	Free
Summer	MF	(Greece) Chousein Moumin	(Greece) Panthrakikos	50k
Summer	DF	(Turkey) Fatih Akyel	(Germany) Bochum	Free
Summer	FW	(Greece) L. Christodoulopoulos	(Greece) PAOK U20	
Winter	DF	(Greece) Nikos Arabatzis	(Greece) Panserraikos	150k
Winter	DF	(Greece) Christos Melissis	(Greece) Panserraikos	100k

Players transferred out

Transfer window	Pos.	Name	Club	Fee
Summer	MF	(Greece) Giorgos Theodoridis	(Greece) Panathinaikos	Free
Summer	MF	(Cyprus) Liasos Louka	(Cyprus) AEL	Free
Summer	MF	(Greece) Loukas Karadimos	(Greece) Atromitos	Free
Summer	FW	(Greece) Nikos Skarmoutsos	(Greece) Atromitos	Free
Summer	MF	(Greece) Dimitrios Zavadias	(Greece) Veria	Free
Summer	MF	(Serbia and Montenegro) Sladan Spasic	(Greece) AEL	Free
Summer	DF	(Greece) Giorgos Zisopoulos	(Greece) Levadiakos	Free
Summer	GK	(Greece) Ilias Atmatsidis	(Greece) Retired	
Winter	MF	(Greece) Dimitrios Zografakis	(Greece) Xanthi	Free
Winter	MF	(Greece) Petros Konteon	(Greece) Panserraikos	Free
Winter	DF	(Greece) Paraskevas Andralas	(Greece) Levadiakos	Free
Winter	FW	(Serbia and Montenegro) Vladimir Karalic	(Bosnia and Herzegovina) FK Sarajevo	Free
Winter	DF	(Turkey) Fatih Akyel	(Turkey) Trabzonspor	Free
Winter	DF	(Greece) V. Koutsopoulos	(Greece) Panionios	Free

== Competitions ==
=== Overview ===
Competition	Record							
Competition	Pld	W	D	L	GF	GA	GD	Win %
Alpha Ethniki	30	13	7	10	44	31	+13	43.33
Greek Cup	1	0	1	0	1	1	+0	0.00
UEFA Cup	6	1	2	3	9	8	+1	16.67
Total	37	14	10	13	54	40	+14	37.84

Source: Competitions

=== Managerial statistics ===
Head coach	From	To	Record							
Head coach	From	To	G	W	D	L	GF	GA	GD	Win %
(Greece) Nikos Karageorgiou	Start Season	16.09.2005	3	0	2	1	3	4	−1	0.00
(Greece) Georgios Kostikos (Interim)	17.09.2005	20.02.2006	24	9	7	8	36	25	+11	37.50
(Romania) Ilie Dumitrescu	21.02.2006	End season	10	5	1	4	15	11	+4	50.00

== Alpha Ethniki ==
=== League table ===
Pos	Team	Pld	W	D	L	GF	GA	GD	Pts	Qualification or relegation
4	Iraklis	30	15	6	9	39	31	+8	51	Qualification for UEFA Cup first round
5	Skoda Xanthi	30	13	8	9	31	25	+6	47	Qualification for UEFA Cup first round
6	PAOK	30	13	7	10	44	31	+13	46	Ineligible for 2006–07 European competitions (Note: PAOK were not licensed to play in the UEFA Cup therefore was replaced by the 7th placed team in the league table, Atromitos.)
7	Atromitos	30	12	6	12	36	37	−1	42	Qualification for UEFA Cup first round
8	AEL	30	10	9	11	31	37	−6	39	Qualification for Intertoto Cup third round

Source: Galanis Sports Data
Rules for classification: 1) Points; 2) Head-to-head points; 3) Head-to-head goal difference; 4) Goal difference; 5) Goals scored; 6) Goals against; 7) Play-offs (neutral ground); 8) Draw.
(Note: Criterion 7 is only used if needed to decide champion, teams for relegation or teams for UEFA competitions).

=== Results summary ===
Overall								Home						Away					
Pld	W	D	L	GF	GA	GD	Pts	W	D	L	GF	GA	GD	W	D	L	GF	GA	GD
30	13	7	10	44	31	+13	46	10	2	3	28	13	+15	3	5	7	16	18	−2

Last updated: 14 May 2006.
Source: Competitive matches

==== Results by round ====
Round	1	2	3	4	5	6	7	8	9	10	11	12	13	14	15	16	17	18	19	20	21	22	23	24	25	26	27	28	29	30
Ground	A	H	A	H	H	A	H	A	H	A	H	A	A	H	A	H	A	H	A	A	H	A	H	A	H	A	H	H	A	H
Result	L	D	D	W	D	W	W	L	W	D	W	L	D	W	D	W	L	W	L	L	L	D	L	W	W	W	W	W	L	L
Position	15	12	12	7	8	6	4	5	5	5	5	5	5	5	5	4	5	4	5	6	6	6	8	6	6	6	6	5	6	6

Source: League matches
A = Away; H = Home; W = Win; D = Draw; L = Loss

==== Matches ====
Win Draw Loss

27 August 2005 1	Xanthi	1–0	PAOK	Xanthi
19:00 EET	Paraskevas Antzas 37' Manager: (Greece) Giannis Matzourakis	Report	Manager: (Greece) Nikos Karageorgiou	Stadium: Xanthi FC Arena; Attendance: 6.410; Referee: Dimitrios Dabosis

10 September 2005 2	PAOK	2–2	Atromitos	Thessaloniki
16:45 EET	Marcin Mieciel 25'; Dimitris Salpingidis 35' Manager: (Greece) Nikos Karageorgiou	Report	60' Giorgos Zacharopoulos; 89' (o.g.) Ifeanyi Udeze Manager: (Greece) Georgios Paraschos	Stadium: Toumba Stadium; Attendance: Cl. doors Referee: Antonios Kouklakis

19 September 2005 3	Iraklis	0–0	PAOK	Thessaloniki
19:00 EET	Manager: (Greece) Savvas Kofidis	Report	Manager: (Greece) Georgios Kostikos	Stadium: Kaftanzoglio Stadium; Attendance: 7.180; Referee: Antonios Kouklakis

25 September 2005 4	PAOK	2–0	Egaleo	Thessaloniki
17:15 EET	Dimitris Salpingidis 12'; Guy Feutchine 20' Manager: (Greece) Georgios Kostikos	Report	Manager: (Greece) Georgios Vazakas	Stadium: Toumba Stadium; Attendance: 2.611; Referee: Basiliou Spyridon

2 October 2005 5	PAOK	2–2	AEL	Thessaloniki
17:30 EET	Dimitris Salpingidis 61' (pen.); Christos Maladenis 79' Manager: (Greece) Georgios Kostikos	Report	2' (o.g.) Christos Karipidis; 90' Thomas Kyparissis Manager: (Greece) Georgios Donis	Stadium: Toumba Stadium; Attendance: 15.324; Referee: Romanos Kontogiannidis

16 October 2005 6	Olympiacos	1–2	PAOK	Piraeus
17:00 EET	Yaya Touré 59' Manager: (Norway) Trond Sollied	Report	66', 71' Pantelis Konstantinidis Manager: (Greece) Georgios Kostikos	Stadium: Karaiskakis Stadium; Attendance: Cl. doors Referee: Basiliou Spyridon

23 October 2005 7	PAOK	6–1	Ionikos	Thessaloniki
17:00 EET	Ifeanyi Udeze 18'; Pantelis Konstantinidis 27'; Dimitris Salpingidis 36', 71'; Guy Feutchine 49'; Lazaros Christodoulopoulos 59' Manager: (Greece) Georgios Kostikos	Report	45' Oliver Makor Manager: (Greece) Sakis Tsiolis	Stadium: Toumba Stadium; Attendance: 6.100; Referee: Antonios Kouklakis

30 October 2005 8	Panathinaikos	1–0	PAOK	Athens
17:00 EET	Vangelis Mantzios 14' Manager: (Italy) Alberto Malesani	Report	Manager: (Greece) Georgios Kostikos	Stadium: Leoforos Alexandras Stadium; Attendance: 21.538; Referee: Vasileios Terovitsas

6 November 2005 9	PAOK	1–0	Panionios	Thessaloniki
17:00 EET	Dimitris Salpingidis 45' (pen.) Manager: (Greece) Georgios Kostikos	Report	Manager: (Slovakia) Jozef Bubenko	Stadium: Toumba Stadium; Attendance: 7.049; Referee: Lazaros Polatian

20 November 2005 10	Kallithea	1–1	PAOK	Athens
17:00 EET	Georgios Koulakiotis 65' Manager: (Romania) Ilie Dumitrescu	Report	21' Shikabala Manager: (Greece) Georgios Kostikos	Stadium: Grigoris Lambrakis Stadium; Attendance: 1.692; Referee: Giannis Tsachilidis

27 November 2005 11	PAOK	2–0	Akratitos	Thessaloniki
17:00 EET	Lazaros Christodoulopoulos 74'; Shikabala 90' Manager: (Greece) Georgios Kostikos	Report	Manager: (Greece) Evangelos Goutis	Stadium: Toumba Stadium; Attendance: 3.008; Referee: Anastasios Kakos

4 December 2005 12	AEK Athens	2–1	PAOK	Athens
17:15 EET	Bruno Cirillo 26'; Alessandro Soares 90' Manager: (Portugal) Fernando Santos	Report	20' Marcin Mięciel Manager: (Greece) Georgios Kostikos	Stadium: Olympic Stadium; Attendance: 27.257; Referee: Athanasios Briakos

10 December 2005 13	Levadiakos	2–2	PAOK	Livadeia
15:45 EET	Amir Azmy 5' (o.g.); Alex 58' Manager: (Greece) Takis Lemonis	Report	57' Dimitris Salpingidis; 88' Christos Maladenis Manager: (Greece) Georgios Kostikos	Stadium: Levadia Municipal Stadium; Attendance: 2.000; Referee: Ioannis Flambouris

18 December 2005 14	PAOK	2–0	OFI	Thessaloniki
18:00 EET	Lazaros Christodoulopoulos 37'; Dimitris Salpingidis 43' Manager: (Greece) Georgios Kostikos	Report	Manager: (Greece) Vangelis Vlachos	Stadium: Toumba Stadium; Attendance: 2.704; Referee: Vasileios Terovitsas

6 January 2006 15	Apollon Kalamarias	2–2	PAOK	Thessaloniki
19:00 EET	Theodoros Zagorakis 5' (o.g.); Charilaos Pappas 40' Manager: (Greece) Makis Katsavakis	Report	65' Yiasoumis Yiasoumi; 67' Elias Charalambous Manager: (Greece) Georgios Kostikos	Stadium: Kalamaria Stadium; Attendance: 1.757; Referee: Anastasios Kakos

15 January 2006 16	PAOK	1–0	Xanthi	Thessaloniki
17:45 EET	Dimitris Salpingidis 63' Manager: (Greece) Georgios Kostikos	Report	Manager: (Greece) Giannis Matzourakis	Stadium: Toumba Stadium; Attendance: 3.682; Referee: Georgios Kasnaferis

29 January 2006 17	Atromitos	2–1	PAOK	Peristeri, Athens
14:45 EET	Giannis Katemis 49'; Georgios Korakakis 83' Manager: (Greece) Georgios Paraschos	Report	43' (pen.) Dimitris Salpingidis Manager: (Greece) Georgios Kostikos	Stadium: Peristeri Stadium; Attendance: 2.450; Referee: Christos Basilou

5 February 2006 18	PAOK	1–0	Iraklis	Thessaloniki
17:30 EET	Marcin Mieciel 24' Manager: (Greece) Georgios Kostikos	Report	Manager: (Greece) Georgios Kostikos	Stadium: Toumba Stadium; Attendance: Cl. doors Referee: Konstantinos Finokaliotis

12 February 2006 19	Egaleo	1–0	PAOK	Athens
15:15 EET	Nikos Nikolopoulos 34' Manager: (Greece) Georgios Chatzaras	Report	Manager: (Greece) Georgios Kostikos	Stadium: Stavros Mavrothalassitis Stadium; Attendance: 1.186; Referee: Michail Koukoulakis

18 February 2006 20	AEL	2–1	PAOK	Larissa
15:45 EET	Giannis Chloros 43'; Christos Kalantzis 51' Manager: (Greece) Georgios Donis	Report	84' Marcin Mięciel Manager: (Greece) Georgios Kostikos	Stadium: Alcazar Stadium; Attendance: 8.906; Referee: Antonios Kouklakis

26 February 2006 21	PAOK	1–2	Olympiacos	Thessaloniki
15:15 EET	Shikabala 5' Manager: (Romania) Ilie Dumitrescu	Report	31' Ioannis Okkas; 77' Michalis Konstantinou Manager: (Norway) Trond Sollied	Stadium: Kalamaria Stadium; Attendance: 7.050; Referee: Athanassios Briakos

5 March 2006 22	Ionikos	1–1	PAOK	Piraeus
16:00 EET	Benjamin Onwuachi 61' Manager: (Greece) Sakis Tsiolis	Report	36' Shikabala Manager: (Romania) Ilie Dumitrescu	Stadium: Neapoli Stadium; Attendance: 1.001; Referee: Ioannis Flambouris

11 March 2006 23	PAOK	0–1	Panathinaikos	Thessaloniki
15:00 EET	Manager: (Romania) Ilie Dumitrescu	Report	65' Dimitrios Papadopoulos Manager: (Italy) Alberto Malesani	Stadium: Toumba Stadium; Attendance: Cl. doors Referee: Romanos Kontogiannidis

20 March 2006 24	Panionios	0–1	PAOK	Nea Smyrni, Athens
19:00 EET	Darío Fernández (penalty missed) 73' Manager: (Slovakia) Jozef Bubenko	Report	49' Dimitris Salpingidis Manager: (Romania) Ilie Dumitrescu	Stadium: Nea Smyrni Stadium; Attendance: 3.628; Referee: Ilias Mazarakos

25 March 2006 25	PAOK	2–1	Kallithea	Thessaloniki
16:45 EET	Dimitris Salpingidis 74' (pen.), 81' (pen.) Manager: (Romania) Ilie Dumitrescu	Report	54' Christos Koutsospyros Manager: (Greece) Antonis Manikas	Stadium: Toumba Stadium; Attendance: Cl. doors Referee: Christoforos Zografos

2 April 2006 26	Akratitos	0–3	PAOK	Athens
17:00 EET	Manager: (Greece) Evangelos Goutis	Report	6' Dimitris Salpingidis; 24', 45' Yiasoumis Yiasoumi Manager: (Romania) Ilie Dumitrescu	Stadium: Yiannis Pathiakakis Stadium; Attendance: 1.777; Referee: Romanos Kontogiannidis

9 April 2006 27	PAOK	2–1	AEK Athens	Thessaloniki
17:00 EET	Georgios Alexopoulos 74' (o.g.); Dimitris Salpingidis 79' Manager: (Romania) Ilie Dumitrescu	Report	90' (pen.) Kostas Katsouranis Manager: (Portugal) Fernando Santos	Stadium: Toumba Stadium; Attendance: 10.300; Referee: Antonis Kitsoukalis

16 April 2006 28	PAOK	3–1	Levadiakos	Thessaloniki
17:00 EET	Dimitris Salpingidis 20', 86'; Yiasoumis Yiasoumi 90' Manager: (Romania) Ilie Dumitrescu	Report	39' Anastasios Pantos Manager: (Greece) Takis Lemonis	Stadium: Toumba Stadium; Attendance: 4.011; Referee: Dimitrios Detsis

30 April 2006 29	OFI	2–1	PAOK	Heraklion
16:00 EET	Joseph Nwafor 43'; Davidson 60' Manager: (Greece) Myron Sifakis	Report	75' Yiasoumis Yiasoumi Manager: (Romania) Ilie Dumitrescu	Stadium: Theodoros Vardinogiannis Stadium; Attendance: 4.137; Referee: Iraklis Tsikinis

14 May 2006 30	PAOK	1–2	Apollon Kalamarias	Thessaloniki
15:45 EET	Marcin Mięciel 17' Manager: (Romania) Ilie Dumitrescu	Report	37' Wellington; 69' Cleyton Manager: (Greece) Makis Katsavakis	Stadium: Toumba Stadium; Attendance: 3.281; Referee: Iraklis Tsikinis

== Greek Cup ==
=== Fourth round ===
27 October 2005	Agrotikos Asteras	1–1 (a.e.t.) (5–4 p)	PAOK	Thessaloniki
	Giannis Mallous 53'	Report	1' (o.g.) Giannis Mallous Manager: (Greece) Georgios Kostikos	Stadium: Agrotikos Asteras Ground; Referee: Georgios Kaznaferis

== UEFA Cup ==
=== First round ===
15 September 2005 1st leg	PAOK (Greece)	1–1	(Ukraine) Metalurh Donetsk	Thessaloniki, Greece
19:30 CET	Salpingidis 25'	Report	66' Shyshchenko	Stadium: Toumba Stadium; Referee: (Spain) Julián Rodríguez Santiago

29 September 2005 2nd leg	Metalurh Donetsk (Ukraine)	2–2 (3–3a agg.)	(Greece) PAOK	Donetsk, Ukraine
18:00 CET	Kosyrin 39'; Shyshchenko 57'	https://www.uefa.com/uefaeuropaleague/match/81795--metalurh-donetsk-vs-paok/ Report	42' Salpingidis; 46' Konstantinidis	Stadium: Shakhtar Stadium; Referee: (Netherlands) Pieter Vink

PAOK advances to the UEFA Cup group stage.

=== Group stage ===
Pos	Team	Pld	W	D	L	GF	GA	GD	Pts	Qualification	RAP	SHK	STU	PAOK	REN
1	(Romania) Rapid București	4	3	0	1	5	2	+3	9	Advance to knockout stage	—	—	—	1–0	2–0
2	(Ukraine) Shakhtar Donetsk	4	3	0	1	4	1	+3	9	Advance to knockout stage	0–1	—	—	1–0	—
3	(Germany) VfB Stuttgart	4	3	0	1	6	4	+2	9	Advance to knockout stage	2–1	0–2	—	—	—
4	(Greece) PAOK	4	1	0	3	6	5	+1	3		—	—	1–2	—	5–1
5	(France) Rennes	4	0	0	4	1	10	−9	0		—	0–1	0–2	—	—

20 October 2005 1	Shakhtar Donetsk (Ukraine)	1–0	(Greece) PAOK	Donetsk, Ukraine
18:00 CEST (UTC+02:00)	Brandão 68' (pen.)	Report		Stadium: RSC Olimpiyskiy; Referee: (Republic of Ireland) Alan Kelly

24 November 2005 2	PAOK (Greece)	1–2	(Germany) Stuttgart	Thessaloniki, Greece
17:00 CEST (UTC+02:00)	Karipidis 48'	Report	Ljuboja 85', 90+1' (pen.)	Stadium: Toumba Stadium; Referee: (Spain) Carlos Megía Dávila

1 December 2005 3	Rapid București (Romania)	1–0	(Greece) PAOK	Bucharest, Romania
20:45 CEST (UTC+02:00)	Măldărăşanu 45+2'	Report		Stadium: Stadionul Giuleşti-Valentin Stănescu; Referee: (Switzerland) Markus Nobs

14 December 2005 4	PAOK (Greece)	5–1	(France) Rennes	Thessaloniki, Greece
20:45 CEST (UTC+02:00)	Rochat 3' (o.g.); Christodoulopoulos 38'; Yiasoumi 79', 89'; Salpingidis 83'	Report	70' Briand	Stadium: Toumba Stadium; Referee: (Portugal) Antonio Costa

== Statistics ==
=== Squad statistics ===
As of Full season 2005–2006

Appearances denote players in the starting lineup, with the numbers in parentheses denoting appearances as substitute.

No.	Name	Alpha Ethniki		Greek Cup		UEFA Cup		Total	
No.	Name	Apps	Goals	Apps	Goals	Apps	Goals	Apps	Goals
Goalkeepers
1	(Portugal) Daniel Fernandes	27	0	1	0	5	0	33	0
33	(Greece) Kyriakos Tohouroglou	3	0	0	0	1	0	4	0
Defenders
2	(Turkey) Fatih Akyel	6	0	0	0	2	0	8	0
3	(Greece) Vangelis Koutsopoulos	0	0	1	0	0	0	1	0
4	(Greece) Christos Karipidis	25 (2)	0	1	0	5	1	31 (2)	1
6	(Greece) Paraskevas Andralas	0	0	0	0	1 (1)	0	1 (1)	0
15	(Greece) Stelios Malezas	2 (2)	0	1 (1)	0	0	0	3 (3)	0
23	(Greece) Dionysis Chasiotis	21 (1)	0	0	0	4 (1)	0	25 (2)	0
24	(Nigeria) Ifeanyi Udeze	26 (1)	1	0	0	5	0	31 (1)	1
31	(Greece) Pantelis Konstantinidis	25 (2)	3	0	0	5	1	30 (2)	4
37	(Greece) Nikos Arabatzis	9 (2)	0	0	0	0	0	9 (2)	0
44	(Cyprus) Elias Charalambous	22 (3)	1	0	0	5	0	27 (3)	1
77	(Egypt) Amir Azmy	8 (3)	0	1	0	3 (1)	0	12 (4)	0
Midfielders
5	(Greece) Christos Maladenis	21 (5)	2	1 (1)	0	3 (2)	0	25 (8)	2
7	(Greece) Theodoros Zagorakis	22	0	0	0	5	0	27	0
8	(Greece) Dimitrios Zografakis	0	0	1	0	1 (1)	0	2 (1)	0
10	(Egypt) Shikabala	23 (7)	4	1	0	4 (3)	0	28 (10)	4
18	(Greece) Lambros Vangelis	14 (4)	0	0	0	2 (1)	0	16 (5)	0
22	(Cameroon) Guy Feutchine	18 (1)	2	0	0	5 (1)	0	23 (2)	2
25	(Greece) Sotiris Balafas	17 (5)	0	1	0	4 (1)	0	22 (6)	0
27	(Greece) Chousein Moumin	3 (3)	0	0	0	0	0	3 (3)	0
28	(Greece) Stelios Iliadis	21 (9)	0	1	0	4 (1)	0	26 (10)	0
30	(Cyprus) Panagiotis Engomitis	10 (8)	0	1	0	3 (1)	0	14 (9)	0
Forwards
9	(Greece) Dimitris Salpingidis	30 (1)	17	1 (1)	0	6 (1)	3	37 (3)	20
11	(Cyprus) Yiasoumis Yiasoumi	14 (7)	5	1	0	2 (1)	2	17 (8)	7
20	(Poland) Marcin Mieciel	25 (6)	5	0	0	5	0	30 (6)	5
29	(Greece) Christodoulopoulos	24 (14)	3	1	0	4 (2)	1	29 (16)	4

=== Goalscorers ===
Rank	No.	Pos.	Player	Alpha Ethniki	Greek Cup	UEFA Cup	Total
1	9	FW	(Greece) Dimitris Salpingidis	17	0	3	20
2	11	FW	(Cyprus) Yiasoumis Yiasoumi	5	0	2	7
3	20	FW	(Poland) Marcin Mieciel	5	0	0	5
4	10	MF	(Egypt) Shikabala	4	0	0	4
5	29	FW	(Greece) Christodoulopoulos	3	0	1	4
6	31	DF	(Greece) P. Konstantinidis	3	0	1	4
7	22	MF	(Cameroon) Guy Feutchine	2	0	0	2
8	5	MF	(Greece) Christos Maladenis	2	0	0	2
9	24	DF	(Nigeria) Ifeanyi Udeze	1	0	0	1
10	44	DF	(Cyprus) Elias Charalambous	1	0	0	1
11	4	DF	(Greece) Christos Karipidis	0	0	1	1
Own goals				1	1	1	3
TOTALS				44	1	9	54

Source: Match reports in competitive matches, uefa.com, worldfootball.net
