= 2003 Greek Football Cup final =

2003 Greek Cup final
- Event: 2002–03 Greek Football Cup
Aris	PAOK
0	1
- Date: 17 May 2003
- Venue: Toumba Stadium, Thessaloniki
- Man of the Match: Giorgos Georgiadis (PAOK)
- Referee: Giorgos Douros (Corinthia)
- Attendance: 18,703
- Weather: Fair; 21 °C (70 °F); 73% humidity

The 2003 Greek Cup final was the 59th final of the Greek Cup. The match took place on 17 May 2003, at Toumba Stadium. The contesting teams were PAOK and Aris. It was Aris' sixth Greek Cup final in their 89 years of existence and PAOK's sixteenth Greek Cup final in their 77-year history.

During the postgame press conference, the manager of Aris, Georgios Firos made a complaint that the final should have been a two-legged tie because PAOK had the advantage of playing on home ground. Kaftanzoglio Stadium, a neutral ground and Thessaloniki's largest stadium was under renovation for the 2004 Summer Olympic games. On 6 September 2002, the HFF Board decided that should the final be held in Thessaloniki—mandated if a local club qualified—Toumba Stadium would serve as the venue, being the second largest in the city. Nine days prior to the match, Aris submitted a request to the Federation demanding that the final be held at either the Kalamaria or Makedonikos stadium—both neutral venues with significantly lower capacities—or that a draw be held between Toumba Stadium and Kleanthis Vikelidis Stadium. Both proposals were rejected, as the HFF Board unanimously reaffirmed its September decision on the matter. The manager of PAOK, Angelos Anastasiadis, became the first in the club's history to win the Cup both as a player (in 1974) and manager.

== Venue ==
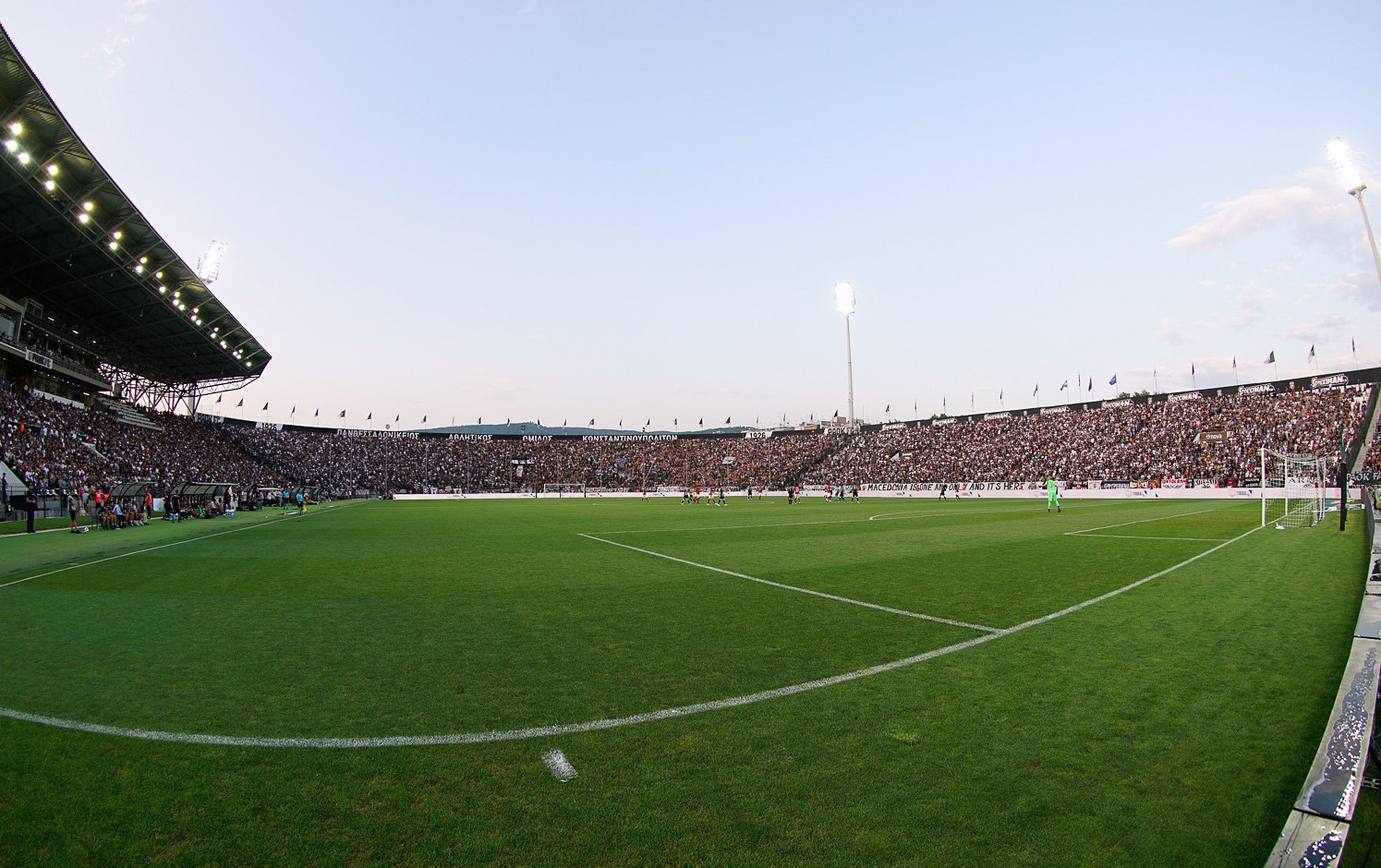
Toumba Stadium.

This was the first Greek Cup final held at Toumba Stadium (Toumba also hosted the first leg of the 1992 two-legged final between PAOK and Olympiacos).

Toumba Stadium was built in 1959 and was renovated five times, in 1998, 1962, 1965, 1972 and 2000. The stadium is used as a venue for PAOK and was used for Greece on various occasions. Its current capacity is 28,701.

== Background ==
Aris had reached the Greek Cup final five times, winning one of them. The last time that they had played in a final was in 1970, where they had won against PAOK by 1–0.

PAOK had reached the Greek Cup final fifteen times, winning three of them. The last time that they had played in a final was in 2001, where they had won against Olympiacos by 4–2.

The two teams had met each other in a Cup final one time in the 1970 final.

== Route to the final ==
Aris				Round	PAOK			
Opponent	Agg.	1st leg	2nd leg		Opponent	Agg.	1st leg	2nd leg
AO Chania	6–0	4–0 (A)	2–0 (H)	First round	Leonidio	1–0	1–0 (A)	0–0 (H)
Patraikos	4–1	1–0 (A)	3–1 (H)	Second round	Olympiacos Volos	2–0	2–0 (H)	0–0 (A)
PAS Giannina	4–0	3–0 (H)	1–0 (A)	Round of 16	OFI	1–1 (a)	0–0 (H)	1–1 (A)
Ethnikos Asteras	3–2	3–1 (H)	0–1 (A)	Quarter-finals	Olympiacos	5–2	3–1 (H)	2–1 (A)
Egaleo	1–1 (a)	1–1 (A)	0–0 (H)	Semi-finals	AEK Athens	2–1	1–0 (A)	1–1 (H)

== Match ==
=== Details ===
17 May 2003
21:15 EEST

Aris	0–1	PAOK
	Report	Georgiadis 24'

Toumba Stadium, Thessaloniki
Attendance: 18,703
Referee: Giorgos Douros (Corinthia)

Aris	PAOK

GK	31	(Greece) Christos Lambakis
RB	29	(South Africa) Nasief Morris
CB	23	(Greece) Giorgos Koltsidas	(yellow card) 20'
CB	21	(Greece) Nikos Papadopoulos (c)	(yellow card) 44'
LB	13	(Greece) Panagiotis Katsiaros
DM	8	(Sweden) Magnus Källander
CM	4	(Greece) Mike Panopoulos		(substituted off) 70'
CM	3	(Greece) Angelos Digozis		(substituted off) 46'
AM	17	(Netherlands) Richard Knopper
SS	10	(Cameroon) Joël Epalle
CF	99	(The Gambia) Njogu Demba-Nyrén		(substituted off) 46'
Substitutes:
GK	1	(Greece) Alexandros Dellios
DF	5	(Greece) Andreas Skentzos
DF	6	(Greece) Giannis Mallous
MF	7	(Greece) Nikos Kyzeridis
MF	20	(North Macedonia) Aguinaldo Braga		(substituted on) 46'
FW	11	(Greece) Leonidas Kampantais		(substituted on) 46'
FW	14	(Morocco) Salaheddine Bassir		(substituted on) 70'
Manager:
(Greece) Georgios Firos

GK	33	(Greece) Kyriakos Tochouroglou
RB	30	(Cyprus) Panagiotis Engomitis
CB	14	(Greece) Giorgos Koutsis		(substituted off) 70'
CB	19	(Ghana) Koffi Amponsah		(substituted off) 89'
LB	3	(Greece) Vangelis Koutsopoulos	(yellow card) 33'
DM	5	(Greece) Dimitris Markos
DM	77	(Poland) Mariusz Kukiełka
AM	1	(Greece) Pantelis Kafes (c)
RW	11	(Greece) Giorgos Georgiadis
LW	9	(Cyprus) Ioannis Okkas
CF	18	(Cyprus) Yiasoumis Yiasoumi	(yellow card) 56'	(substituted off) 74'
Substitutes:
GK	31	(Greece) Ilias Atmatsidis
DF	23	(Greece) Dionysis Chasiotis		(substituted on) 70'
DF	44	(Greece) Loukas Karadimos
DF	80	(Greece) Vangelis Nastos		(substituted on) 89'
MF	22	(Cameroon) Guy Feutchine
FW	8	(Greece) Dimitris Salpingidis
FW	20	(Serbia and Montenegro) Slađan Spasić		(substituted on) 74'
Manager:
(Greece) Angelos Anastasiadis

Man of the Match:
(Greece) Giorgos Georgiadis (PAOK)

Assistant referees:
Lykourgos Tsolakidis (Athens)
Dimitris Groutsis (Corinthia)
Fourth official:
Giorgos Borovilos (Arcadia)

Match rules

- 90 minutes
- 30 minutes of extra time if necessary
- Penalty shootout if scores still level
- Seven named substitutes
- Maximum of three substitutions

== See also ==
- 2002–03 Greek Football Cup
