= Argyronisos =

Island in Greece

Native name: Αργυρόνησος
- Interactive map of Argyronisos

Geography
- Coordinates: 39°00′30″N 23°04′12″E
- Archipelago: Aegean Sea

Administration
- Greece

Argyronisos (Greek: Αργυρόνησος - "silver island") is a privately owned island in the Aegean Sea. The island lies between Kanatadika on Euboea and the mainland near Achilleio, Magnesia. Administratively, it is part of the municipality Almyros. The most prominent landmark on the island is the lighthouse built in 1899.

Its highest point is 24 meters above sea level.
