= Apostolos Papadopoulos =

Apostolos Papadopoulos of George (Greek: Απόστολος Παπαδόπουλος του Γεωργίου; 1900 in Pteleos – 1983 in Thessaloniki) was a professor of theology, writer and preacher, with significant social action, who was awarded with the officium of teacher of the Great Church of Christ.

== Biography ==
=== Early life ===
He was born in Pteleos, Magnesia, in 1900. He was the son of the priest Georgios Papadopoulos, who built the church of St. Euthymios in Pigadi in Pteleos and of his wife Eleni. After 1907, when his father died, his mother raised him along with his five siblings, working as a practical midwife.

=== Education ===
He enrolled in the Theological Department of the University of Athens. He didn't graduate because he was conscripted during 1920 – 1922, participating in the Greco-Turkish war and being awarded the Cross of Valour. He returned to Athens and graduated in 1924.

=== Career and personal life ===
After graduation, he was appointed teacher of theology in various high schools in Lafko, Sourpi, Sofades, Tsaritsani, Karditsa, Almyros, and mainly Volos, where he settled after his marriage with Aspasia Tsaknaki in November 1935. During the Axis occupation of Greece, he participated in distributing food, medicine, clothes, and other help to those in need in Magnesia, as part of the Organisation of Christian Solidarity.
