= Panagiotis Engomitis =

Cypriot footballer and manager

Yiotis Engomitis
Personal information
- Full name: Panagiotis Engomitis
- Date of birth: May 26, 1972 (age 54)
- Place of birth: Famagusta, Cyprus
- Height: 1.75 m (5 ft 9 in)
- Positions: Right midfielder; right back

Youth career
- 1989–1992: Ethnikos Achna

Senior career*
| Years | Team | Apps | (Gls) |
| 1992–1997 | Ethnikos Achna | 118 | (33) |
| 1997–2000 | Anorthosis Famagusta | 61 | (28) |
| 2000–2006 | PAOK | 76 | (10) |
| 2006–2009 | Ethnikos Achna | 36 | (2) |
| Total | | 291 | (73) |

International career
| 1994–2003 | Cyprus | 45 | (7) |

Managerial career
- 2009–2017: Ethnikos Achna (assistant)
- 2016: Ethnikos Achna (caretaker)
- 2017: Ethnikos Achna (caretaker)
- 2017: Ethnikos Achna
- 2018: Ethnikos Achna (assistant)
- 2018–2019: Ethnikos Achna
- 2020–2021: Cyprus U17
- 2021–: Cyprus (assistant)
- * Club domestic league appearances and goals

Panagiotis "Yiotis" Engomitis (Greek: Παναγιώτης "Γιώτης" Εγκωμίτης; born 26 May 1972) is a former Cypriot international footballer who played as a right midfielder and is currently a football coach. He played for Ethnikos Achna, Anorthosis Famagusta and PAOK.

== Playing career ==
=== Club career ===
Engomitis began his football career at Ethnikos Achna. In the 1991–92 season, he was a member of the squad that won the Cypriot Second Division title and for the next five seasons, he competed with the club in the top-tier First Division.

In 1997, he was transferred to Anorthosis Famagusta and played for three seasons under manager Dušan Mitošević, winning three First Division titles (1997–98, 1998–99, 1999–2000), one Cup (1997–98) and two Super Cups (1998, 1999). In 1999, he was named Athlete of the Year by the Cyprus Sports Writers Association (Greek: Ένωση Αθλητικογράφων Κύπρου or ΕΑΚ), which is considered the top sports award in the country.

In 2000, he moved to Greece and was transferred along with his teammate Giannis Okkas to PAOK, following a recommendation for their acquisition by the then PAOK manager, Dušan Bajević. He played for PAOK until 2006, winning two Greek Cups (2000–01, 2002–03). On 12 May 2001, in the Greek Cup final held at Nikos Goumas Stadium, he opened the scoreline in the 4th minute and was named Most Valuable Player (MVP) of the match in a 4–2 win over Olympiacos. Engomitis played for PAOK mainly as a right midfielder and his contribution to the club would undoubtedly have been greater if he had not frequently suffered from muscle injuries. His virtue, talent and fighting spirit were appreciated by PAOK fans and in February 2015, he was honored by the PAOK FC management at the Toumba Stadium.

In 2006, he returned to Cyprus and played for Ethnikos Achna until 2009, when he retired from active football.

On 18 October 2009, a testimonial match was held in his honour at the Dasaki Stadium between Ethnikos and Anorthosis (1–1), where he was awarded by the Cyprus Football Association (CFA), the Cyprus Sports Writers' Association (EAK), the Cyprus Footballers' Association (PASP), the Coaches' Association and other bodies. The gate receipts were donated to charitable institutions, at his own request.

=== International career ===
Engomitis had 45 caps and scored 7 goals for the Cyprus national team between 1994 and 2003.

== Managerial career ==
After his retirement from active playing, Engomitis became involved in coaching and worked as an academy director and later as an assistant, caretaker and head coach at Ethnikos Achna. In the 2018–19 season, he led Ethnikos to promotion to the first division, winning the Second Division Championship. In 2020, he was appointed as Cyprus U17 National Team coach and since 2021 he has been an assistant coach of the Men's National Team.

== Career statistics ==
=== Club career ===
Appearances and goals by club, season and competition
| Club | Season | League | | | Cup | | Continental | | Total | |
| Club | Season | Division | Apps | Goals | Apps | Goals | Apps | Goals | Apps | Goals |
|---|---|---|---|---|---|---|---|---|---|---|
| Ethnikos Achna | 1992–93 | Cypriot League | 23 | 5 | | | – | | | |
| Ethnikos Achna | 1993–94 | Cypriot League | 24 | 2 | | | – | | | |
| Ethnikos Achna | 1994–95 | Cypriot League | 24 | 5 | | | – | | | |
| Ethnikos Achna | 1995–96 | Cypriot League | 25 | 11 | | | – | | | |
| Ethnikos Achna | 1996–97 | Cypriot League | 22 | 10 | | | – | | | |
| Ethnikos Achna | Total | | 118 | 33 | | | – | | | |
| Anorthosis Famagusta | 1997–98 | Cypriot League | 20 | 8 | | | 4 | 0 | | |
| Anorthosis Famagusta | 1998–99 | Cypriot League | 20 | 12 | | | 6 | 0 | | |
| Anorthosis Famagusta | 1999–2000 | Cypriot League | 21 | 8 | | | 6 | 1 | | |
| Anorthosis Famagusta | Total | | 61 | 28 | | | 16 | 1 | | |
| PAOK | 2000–01 | Greek League | 15 | 5 | 11 | 2 | 3 | 0 | 29 | 7 |
| PAOK | 2001–02 | Greek League | 5 | 1 | 2 | 1 | 2 | 0 | 9 | 2 |
| PAOK | 2002–03 | Greek League | 17 | 0 | 7 | 0 | 0 | 0 | 24 | 0 |
| PAOK | 2003–04 | Greek League | 8 | 3 | 2 | 0 | 1 | 0 | 11 | 3 |
| PAOK | 2004–05 | Greek League | 21 | 1 | 2 | 0 | 3 | 0 | 26 | 1 |
| PAOK | 2005–06 | Greek League | 10 | 0 | 1 | 0 | 3 | 0 | 14 | 0 |
| PAOK | Total | | 76 | 10 | 25 | 3 | 12 | 0 | 113 | 13 |
| Ethnikos Achna | 2006–07 | Cypriot League | 21 | 2 | | | 2 | 0 | | |
| Ethnikos Achna | 2007–08 | Cypriot League | 13 | 0 | | | 1 | 0 | | |
| Ethnikos Achna | 2008–09 | Cypriot League | 2 | 0 | | | 2 | 0 | | |
| Ethnikos Achna | Total | | 36 | 2 | | | 5 | 0 | | |
| Career total | | | 291 | 73 | | | 33 | 1 | | |

=== International career ===
| National team | Year | Caps | Goals |
|---|---|---|---|
Cyprus
| Cyprus | 1994 | 2 | 0 |
| Cyprus | 1995 | 8 | 2 |
| Cyprus | 1996 | 2 | 0 |
| Cyprus | 1997 | 8 | 1 |
| Cyprus | 1998 | 4 | 2 |
| Cyprus | 1999 | 4 | 1 |
| Cyprus | 2000 | 5 | 0 |
| Cyprus | 2001 | 5 | 1 |
| Cyprus | 2002 | 2 | 0 |
| Cyprus | 2003 | 5 | 0 |
| Total | | 45 | 7 |

List of international goals scored by Panagiotis Engomitis
| No. | Date | Venue | Opponent | Score | Result | Competition |
|---|---|---|---|---|---|---|
| 1 | 15 February 1995 | Tsirio Stadium, Limassol | Estonia | 2–1 | 3–1 | Friendly |
| 2 | 8 March 1995 | Tsirio Stadium, Limassol | Sweden | 3–3 | 3–3 | Friendly |
| 3 | 14 February 1997 | Paralimni Stadium, Paralimni | Latvia | 2–0 | 2–0 | Cyprus International Tournament |
| 4 | 19 August 1998 | Makario Stadium, Nicosia | Albania | 1–2 | 3–2 | Friendly |
| 5 | 5 September 1998 | Antonis Papadopoulos Stadium, Larnaca | Spain | 1–0 | 3–2 | UEFA Euro 2000 qualifying |
| 6 | 5 September 1999 | Tsirio Stadium, Limassol | Israel | 1–0 | 3–2 | UEFA Euro 2000 qualifying |
| 7 | 28 February 2001 | GSZ Stadium, Larnaca | Ukraine | 2–1 | 4–3 (a.e.t.) | Cyprus International Tournament |

== Honours ==
=== As a player ===
Ethnikos Achna

- Cypriot Second Division: 1991–92
- UEFA Intertoto Cup Joint Winner: 2006

Anorthosis Famagusta

- Cypriot First Division: 1997–98, 1998–99, 1999–2000
- Cypriot Cup: 1997–98
- Cypriot Super Cup: 1998, 1999

PAOK

- Greek Cup: 2000–01, 2002–03

Individual

- Cyprus Sports Writers' Association (EAK) Awards - Athlete of the year: 1999
- Greek Cup final MVP: 2001

=== As a manager ===
Ethnikos Achna

- Cypriot Second Division: 2018–19
