= Pteleos =

Pteleos Πτελεός
- Municipal unit
- Location within the regional unit

- Location within Greece
- Coordinates: 39°03′N 22°57′E
- Country: Greece
- Administrative region: Thessaly
- Regional unit: Magnesia
- Municipality: Almyros

Area
  - Municipal unit: 118 km^{2} (46 sq mi)

Population (2021)
  - Municipal unit: 1,990
  - Municipal unit density: 16.9/km^{2} (43.7/sq mi)
  - Community: 1,195
- Time zone: UTC+2 (EET)
  - Summer (DST): UTC+3 (EEST)
- Vehicle registration: ΒΟ

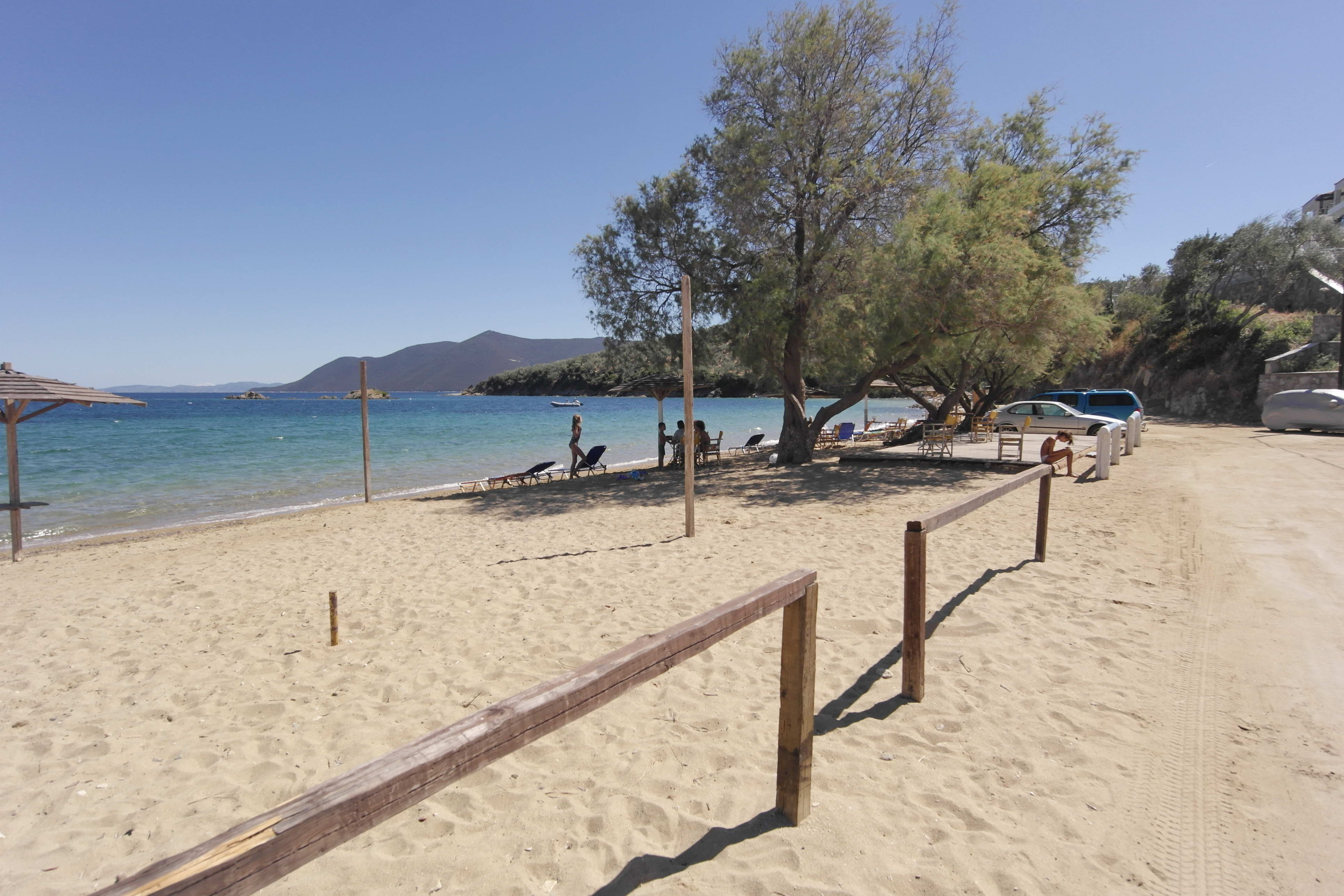
Agia Marina beach, Pteleos

Pteleos (Greek: Πτελεός) is a village and a former municipality in the southern part of Magnesia, Thessaly, Greece. Since the 2011 local government reform, it has been part of the municipality of Almyros, of which it is a municipal unit. The municipal unit has an area of 118.230 km^{2}, and a population of 1,990 in 2021.

== History ==
The area has been populated already since the prehistoric times, although not to be identified as the place Pteleum in ancient Elis that belonged to Nestor in the Catalogue of Ships in the Iliad. Several tombs from the Mycenean period survive between Pteleos (Pteleum) and Agioi Theodoroi.

The current settlement lies to the north and land-inward of the ancient and medieval settlements in the area. An ancient settlement, which survived until early Byzantine times, was located on the southern coast of the Bay of Pteleos near the modern village of Achilleion, where a mosaic floor and remains of two early Christian basilicas have been found. The medieval settlement was located on the northern part of the Bay, near the modern village of Pigadi, and is attested for the first time in 1192, when "wine from Pteleos" (οἶνος Πτελεατικός) is mentioned as being traded in Constantinople.

After the Fourth Crusade (1204), the area passed under the control of the Frankish Kingdom of Thessalonica, but in 1218 it was recovered by the Despotate of Epirus. Epirote rule continued until it was occupied by the Empire of Nicaea (and after 1261 by the restored Byzantine Empire) following the Battle of Pelagonia, but it probably was more often under the control or influence of the autonomous Greek rulers of Neopatras. When the Catalans occupied Neopatras in 1319, in 1322 the castrum Phtelei was taken over by the Republic of Venice, with the agreement of the Byzantines and the inhabitants. The Republic installed a rector (governor) and a castellan, and administered the fortress as part of its colony of Negroponte. In 1350 it was plundered by the Catalans and their Albanian allies, but remained in Venetian hands as an isolated outpost on the mainland until 1470, when it was surrendered to the Ottoman Empire following the loss of Negroponte. Its inhabitants were deported to repopulate Constantinople. Parts of the ruined medieval fortress survive to this day, southwest of Pigadi: a square donjon, a cistern, foundations of houses and a town wall, and the so-called Alatopyrgos ("salt tower"), a watchtower on the coast.
