= Xanthi Ground =

Football stadium in Xanthi, Greece

Coordinates: 41°8′38″N 24°53′38″E

- Gipedo Xanthis
- Interactive map of Xanthi Ground
- Location: Xanthi, Greece
- Owner: Xanthi F.C.
- Operator: Xanthi F.C.
- Capacity: 9,500
- Surface: Grass

Construction
- Built: 1970

Tenant
- Xanthi F.C. (1970-2004, 2022-current)

A.O. Xanthi Ground is a football stadium in Xanthi, Greece.It is currently used by Xanthi F.C. who play in the Gamma Ethniki. The stadium holds a capacity of 9,500 seats and was built in 1970.
