= Stylianos Venetidis =

Greek footballer

Stelios Venetidis
Personal information
- Full name: Stylianos Venetidis
- Date of birth: 19 November 1976 (age 49)
- Place of birth: Orestiada, Greece
- Height: 1.76 m (5 ft 9 in)
- Positions: Left back; left wing back; left midfielder

Team information
- Current team: OFI (Director of youth)

Senior career*
Years	Team	Apps	(Gls)
1994–1996	Orestis Orestiada	25	(3)
1996–1999	Skoda Xanthi	118	(2)
1999–2001	PAOK	55	(1)
2001–2006	Olympiacos	77	(0)
2006–2012	AEL	117	(3)
Total		392	(9)

International career
1999–2004	Greece	42	(0)

Managerial career
- 2015: Olympiacos Volos (assistant)
- 2015–2016: Panthrakikos (assistant)
- 2016: Veria (assistant)
- 2016–2017: Asteras Tripolis (assistant)
- 2017: Kerkyra (assistant)
- 2018: Iraklis (assistant)
- 2020: Panachaiki (assistant)
- 2022: Kifisia (assistant)
- 2022: Panserraikos (assistant)
- 2022–2024: Niki Volos (assistant)
Medal record
Men's football
Representing Greece
UEFA European Championship
Winner	2004
- * Club domestic league appearances and goals

Stelios Venetidis (Greek: Στέλιος Βενετίδης; born 19 November 1976 in Orestiada) is a Greek former professional footballer who played as a defender. He used to play in the left-back position, but could be also used on the left side of midfield.

Venetidis's career saw him with several Greek football teams, as well as a role in the Greece national team. He also played in three games at UEFA Euro 2004. In May 2012, he officially retired.

== Honours ==
PAOK

- Greek Cup: 2000–01

Olympiacos

- Alpha Ethniki: 2001–02, 2002–03, 2004–05, 2005–06
- Greek Cup: 2004–05, 2005–06

AEL

- Greek Cup: 2006–07

Greece

- UEFA European Championship: 2004
