= Ioannis Okkas =

Cypriot footballer and manager (born 1977)

Giannis Okkas
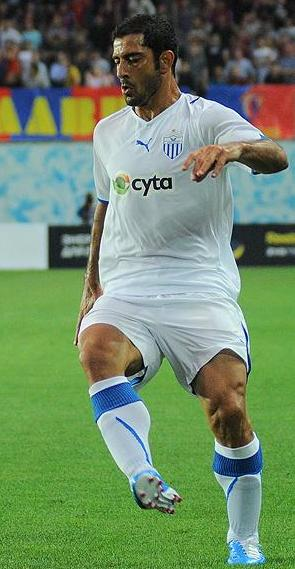
- Okkas with Anorthosis Famagusta in 2010

Personal information
- Full name: Ioannis Okkas
- Date of birth: 11 February 1977 (age 49)
- Place of birth: Larnaca, Cyprus
- Height: 1.76 m (5 ft 9 in)
- Positions: Forward; left winger

Team information
- Current team: Omonia Aradippou (manager)

Youth career
- –1993: Nea Salamina

Senior career*
Years	Team	Apps	(Gls)
1993–1997	Nea Salamina	53	(16)
1997–2000	Anorthosis Famagusta	72	(41)
2000–2003	PAOK	80	(29)
2003–2004	AEK Athens	24	(5)
2004–2007	Olympiacos	77	(15)
2007–2008	Celta Vigo	24	(6)
2008–2009	Omonia	23	(9)
2009–2014	Anorthosis Famagusta	119	(29)
2014	Ermis Aradippou	14	(2)
Total		486	(152)

International career
1997–2011	Cyprus	106	(27)

Managerial career
- 2015: Ermis Aradippou
- 2016–2019: Cyprus U17
- 2019–2021: Cyprus (assistant)
- 2021–2022: Cyprus U21
- 2022–2023: Olympiacos B
- 2023–2024: Anorthosis Famagusta
- 2026: Akritas Chlorakas
- 2026–: Omonia Aradippou
- * Club domestic league appearances and goals

Ioannis "Giannis" Okkas (Greek: Ιωάννης "Γιάννης" Οκκάς; born 11 February 1977) is a Cypriot football manager and former player, who is the current manager of Omonia Aradippou.

Okkas played as a forward and represented eight different clubs throughout his career, with his most successful spells being at Anorthosis Famagusta, PAOK and Olympiacos. Regarded as one of the greatest Cypriot footballers in history, he is the all-time appearance leader for the Cyprus national team and its second-highest goalscorer, having 106 caps and 27 goals.

== Club career ==
=== Early career in Cyprus (1993–2000) ===
Okkas started his career with Nea Salamis in the 1993–94 season, aged 17. In the summer of 1997, he was transferred to Anorthosis Famagusta for a reported fee of £350,000, and played for three seasons under manager Dušan Mitošević, winning three Cypriot First Division titles (1997–98, 1998–99, 1999–2000), one Cup (1997–98) and two Super Cups (1998, 1999). He scored the second goal in Anorthosis' 3–1 win against Apollon Limassol in the 1998 Cypriot Cup final.

=== Greece (2000–2007) ===
In the summer of 2000, Okkas was transferred along with his teammate Yiotis Engomitis to PAOK for a reported fee of 900 million drachmas. During his three-year stint, he won two Greek Cups (2000–01, 2002–03) and was named the club's season MVP in both 2002 and 2003. In the summer of 2003, PAOK who were struggling financially, did not meet his demands for a new contract and he signed for AEK Athens as a free agent. On 2 August 2004, after his release from AEK due to the club's financial issues, he signed for Olympiacos. Okkas' three transfers to Greek clubs all occurred under manager Dušan Bajević, who personally recommended his signings. On his league debut for Olympiacos he scored the very first goal of the club in the newly built Karaiskakis Stadium. Okkas won with Olympiacos three league titles (2004–05, 2005–06, 2006–07) and two Greek Cups (2004–05, 2005–06).

=== Later career (2007–2014) ===
In 2007, after trials at West Ham United and Derby County, Okkas became the first Cypriot player to move to Spain, signing a contract with Celta Vigo, who were playing in the Segunda División at the time. In 2008, he returned to Cyprus to play for Omonia. Okkas was released from Omonia, in June 2009, after confronting manager Takis Lemonis on his playing position. He returned to Anorthosis, signing a three-year contract with the club. In January 2014, after being released by Anorthosis, Ermis Aradippou became the fourth, and last, team, Okkas would play for in the Cypriot First Division. His last competitive game was the 2014 Cypriot Cup final, after which he ended his career.

== International career ==
Okkas debuted for the Cyprus national team on 15 February 1997 in a friendly 2–3 home loss against Poland. He made his competitive debut in a match against Russia, on 29 March 1997, for the 1998 World Cup qualifying stage. Four days later he scored his first goal for Cyprus in a 4–1 away defeat against Bulgaria.

He scored three goals in his side's failed attempts to qualify for the 2002 World Cup, and was also on target in Euro 2004's qualifying stage, notably against France, in which Cyprus lost 1–2, but with fine displays from Okkas, including a delicate chip that left French keeper Grégory Coupet completely stranded.

On 15 November 2006, Okkas netted in a surprising Euro 2008 qualifier draw with giants Germany. He started captaining the national squad since the 2006 FIFA World Cup qyalifying stage.

On 8 October 2010, Okkas made his 100th cap and scored his 26th goal for the Cyprus national team in a 1–2 home loss against Norway.

On 11 October 2011, he played for the last time with the national side, in a Euro 2012 qualifier against Norway at the Ullevaal Stadion, where he scored his last international goal. On 2 March 2012, Okkas announced his retirement from international football. At the time of his retirement, Okkas was the most-capped player for Cyprus and its second all-time scorer.

== Trivia ==
For two consecutive years, Okkas scored the first league goal of the season in Greece, with AEK in 2003–04 and Olympiacos the next season.

== Coaching career ==
After retiring as a professional football player, Okkas was appointed as an assistant manager in Ermis Aradippou. In March 2015, he replaced Mitchell van der Gaag as manager of Ermis Aradippou. He was dismissed from his position at Ermis on 11 May.

== Career statistics ==
=== Club career ===
Appearances and goals by club, season and competition
Club	Season	League			Cup		Continental		Total	
Club	Season	Division	Apps	Goals	Apps	Goals	Apps	Goals	Apps	Goals
Nea Salamis Famagusta	1993–94	Cypriot League	2	1			–			
Nea Salamis Famagusta	1994–95	Cypriot League	14	2			–			
Nea Salamis Famagusta	1995–96	Cypriot League	12	3			–			
Nea Salamis Famagusta	1996–97	Cypriot League	25	10			–			
Nea Salamis Famagusta	Total		53	16			–			
Anorthosis Famagusta	1997–98	Cypriot League	25	14			6	3		
Anorthosis Famagusta	1998–99	Cypriot League	25	15			5	2		
Anorthosis Famagusta	1999–2000	Cypriot League	22	12			6	0		
Anorthosis Famagusta	Total		72	41			17	5		
PAOK	2000–01	Greek League	26	8	13	2	6	0	45	10
PAOK	2001–02	Greek League	25	10	7	2	6	2	38	14
PAOK	2002–03	Greek League	29	11	8	3	6	2	43	16
PAOK	Total		80	29	28	7	18	4	126	40
AEK Athens	2003–04	Greek League	24	5	7	4	8	0	39	9
Olympiacos	2004–05	Greek League	25	5	8	4	10	2	43	11
Olympiacos	2005–06	Greek League	27	7	7	1	6	0	40	8
Olympiacos	2006–07	Greek League	25	3	3	1	3	0	31	4
Olympiacos	Total		77	15	18	6	19	2	114	23
Celta Vigo	2007–08	Segunda División	24	6	0	0	–		24	6
Omonia	2008–09	Cypriot League	23	9	3	0	4	0	30	9
Anorthosis Famagusta	2009–10	Cypriot League	28	8	4	0	0	0	32	8
Anorthosis Famagusta	2010–11	Cypriot League	25	8	3	1	8	2	36	11
Anorthosis Famagusta	2011–12	Cypriot League	31	6	3	2	4	0	38	8
Anorthosis Famagusta	2012–13	Cypriot League	28	7	2	1	4	2	34	10
Anorthosis Famagusta	2013–14 (i)	Cypriot League	7	0	0	0	2	0	9	0
Anorthosis Famagusta	Total		119	29	12	4	18	4	149	37
Ermis Aradippou	2013–14 (ii)	Cypriot League	14	2	2	0	–		16	2
Career total			486	152			84	15		

=== International career ===
National team	Year	Caps	Goals
Cyprus
Cyprus	1997	8	1
Cyprus	1998	7	1
Cyprus	1999	9	0
Cyprus	2000	9	3
Cyprus	2001	9	3
Cyprus	2002	7	2
Cyprus	2003	7	0
Cyprus	2004	5	2
Cyprus	2005	6	1
Cyprus	2006	7	3
Cyprus	2007	10	5
Cyprus	2008	5	0
Cyprus	2009	8	3
Cyprus	2010	4	2
Cyprus	2011	5	1
Total		106	27

Ioannis Okkas: International goals
No.	Date	Venue	Opponent	Score	Result	Competition
1	2 April 1997	Vasil Levski National Stadium, Sofia, Bulgaria	Bulgaria	3–1	4–1	1998 World Cup qualifying
2	5 February 1998	Tsirion Stadium, Limassol, Cyprus	Finland	1–1	1–1	Friendly
3	6 February 2000	GSP Stadium, Nicosia, Cyprus	Romania	1–0	3–2	Cyprus International Tournament
4	15 November 2000	Tsirion Stadium, Limassol, Cyprus	Andorra	1–0	5–0	2002 World Cup qualifying
5	15 November 2000	Tsirion Stadium, Limassol, Cyprus	Andorra	2–0	5–0	2002 World Cup qualifying
6	28 February 2001	GSZ Stadium, Larnaca, Cyprus	Ukraine	1–1	4–3	Cyprus International Tournament
7	28 March 2001	Tsirion Stadium, Limassol, Cyprus	Estonia	2–0	2–2	2002 World Cup qualifying
8	14 November 2001	Kesariani Stadium, Athens, Greece	Greece	0–1	1–2	Friendly
9	7 September 2002	GSP Stadium, Nicosia, Cyprus	France	1–0	1–2	Euro 2004 qualifying
10	20 November 2002	GSP Stadium, Nicosia, Cyprus	Malta	2–0	2–1	Euro 2004 qualifying
11	9 October 2004	GSP Stadium, Nicosia, Cyprus	Faroe Islands	2–2	2–2	2006 World Cup qualifying
12	17 November 2004	GSP Stadium, Nicosia, Cyprus	Israel	1–1	1–2	2006 World Cup qualifying
13	26 March 2005	GSZ Stadium, Larnaca, Cyprus	Jordan	2–0	2–1	Friendly
14	1 March 2006	Tsirion Stadium, Limassol, Cyprus	Armenia	1–0	2–0	Friendly
15	11 October 2006	Millennium Stadium, Cardiff, Wales	Wales	3–1	3–1	Euro 2008 qualifying
16	15 November 2006	GSP Stadium, Nicosia, Cyprus	Germany	1–1	1–1	Euro 2008 qualifying
17	6 February 2007	Tsirion Stadium, Limassol, Cyprus	Hungary	2–0	2–1	Cyprus International Tournament
18	22 August 2007	Stadio Olimpico (San Marino), Serravalle, San Marino	San Marino	0–1	0–1	Euro 2008 qualifying
19	8 September 2007	Dasaki Stadium, Achna, Cyprus	Armenia	2–1	3–1	Friendly
20	13 October 2007	GSP Stadium, Nicosia, Cyprus	Wales	1–1	3–1	Euro 2008 qualifying
21	13 October 2007	GSP Stadium, Nicosia, Cyprus	Wales	2–1	3–1	Euro 2008 qualifying
22	11 February 2009	Makario Stadium, Nicosia, Cyprus	Slovakia	3–0	3–2	Cyprus International Tournament
23	9 September 2009	Podgorica City Stadium, Podgorica, Montenegro	Montenegro	1–1	1–1	2010 World Cup qualifying
24	14 October 2009	Stadio Ennio Tardini, Parma, Italy	Italy	0–1	3–2	2010 World Cup qualifying
25	3 September 2010	Estádio D. Afonso Henriques, Guimarães, Portugal	Portugal	3–3	4–4	Euro 2012 qualifying
26	8 October 2010	Antonis Papadopoulos Stadium, Larnaca, Cyprus	Norway	1–2	1–2	Euro 2012 qualifying
27	11 October 2011	Ullevaal Stadion, Oslo, Norway	Norway	2–1	3–1	Euro 2012 qualifying

== Honours ==
Anorthosis Famagusta

- Cypriot First Division: 1997–98, 1998–99, 1999–2000
- Cypriot Cup: 1997–98
- Cypriot Super Cup: 1998, 1999

PAOK

- Greek Cup: 2000–01, 2002–03

Olympiacos

- Super League Greece: 2004–05, 2005–06, 2006–07
- Greek Cup: 2004–05, 2005–06

Individual

- Cyprus national team all-time most-capped player: 106 caps
- Cyprus national team second all-time scorer: 27 goals
- PAOK MVP of the Season: 2001–02, 2002–03

== See also ==
- List of men's footballers with 100 or more international caps
