= Georgios Georgiadis (footballer, born 1972) =

Greek footballer (born 1972)

Giorgos Georgiadis
Personal information
- Full name: Georgios Charalambous Georgiadis
- Date of birth: 8 March 1972 (age 54)
- Place of birth: Kavala, Greece
- Height: 1.73 m (5 ft 8 in)
- Positions: Right winger; forward

Youth career
- 1987–1990: Keravnos Krinidon

Senior career*
Years	Team	Apps	(Gls)
1990–1992	Doxa Drama	77	(17)
1992–1998	Panathinaikos	176	(60)
1998–1999	Newcastle United	10	(0)
1999–2003	PAOK	105	(42)
2003–2005	Olympiacos	44	(9)
2005–2007	Iraklis	36	(6)
2007–2008	PAOK	38	(3)
Total		486	(137)

International career
1993–2004	Greece	61	(11)

Managerial career
- 2009–2010: Greece U19
- 2010–2012: Greece U21
- 2012–2013: PAOK (Sporting Director)
- 2013: PAOK (caretaker)
- 2013–2014: PAOK (Assistant Manager)
- 2014: PAOK (caretaker)
- 2015: PAOK (caretaker)
- 2015–2016: Veria
- 2016–2017: Trikala
- 2017–2024: PAOK Academy (Sporting Director)
Medal record
Men's football
Representing Greece
UEFA European Championship
Winner	2004
- * Club domestic league appearances and goals

Georgios Charalambous Georgiadis (Greek: Γεώργιος Γεωργιάδης, born 8 March 1972) is a Greek former professional footballer, now a football coach. A former right winger, he made 61 appearances for the Greece national football team, and played for several Greek clubs including Panathinaikos and two spells at PAOK. He was also signed by the English club Newcastle for a season, where he quickly became known by the nickname Geordie Geordiadis. After retiring in 2008 he coached the Greece U21 side.

== Club career ==
Born in Kavala, Greece, Georgiadis' family, soon after his birth, left for Stuttgart, Germany, where young Giorgos first learned to play football. He returned to Greece, as a teenager and signed up for amateur side Keravnos Krinides. Soon he was discovered by Alpha Ethniki club Doxa Drama who signed him at age 17.

He was transferred to major club Panathinaikos and played for the Athens greens from the 1993–94 until the 1997–98 season. He was member of the squad who reached the Champions League semi finals in 1995–96. His exposure to European football brought an offer from English Premiership side, Newcastle United, for £420,000 and Georgiadis joined fellow Greek Nikos Dabizas at St James' Park in the 1999 season. During that year, Newcastle United made it to the FA Cup Final but lost out to Manchester United. It was in the FA Cup that Georgiadis scored his only Newcastle goal, in the 4–1 win over Everton.

Georgiadis returned to Greece to play for PAOK from 2000 until 2003 before transferring to Olympiacos.

He was released by Olympiacos after the 2004–05 season and was signed up by Iraklis. After one and a half seasons with Iraklis, Georgiadis left the club as a free transfer to PAOK in January 2007. On 1 July 2008, he retired from professional football as a player. Throughout his career, he won three Greek First Division with Panathinaikos and Olympiacos and six Greek Cups with Panathinaikos, Olympiacos and PAOK.

== International career ==
Georgiadis was capped 61 times and has scored 11 goals for Greece. He was also a member of the squad that won the UEFA Euro 2004.

== Managerial career ==
On 5 May, it was announced that Georgiadis was appointed as a scout at his former club. Georgiadis after was called up to coach the Greece U21, after the previous coach Nikos Nioplias was named to coach Panathinaikos. In May 2013, Georgiadis was appointed caretaker manager for PAOK in place of Georgios Donis successfully steering them to a first-place finish in the Super League playoffs. In March 2014, was appointed as caretaker manager of PAOK in place of Huub Stevens. In March 2015, he was appointed once again as caretaker manager for PAOK in place of Angelos Anastasiadis.

On 18 June 2015, he was appointed as Veria manager.

On 5 September 2016, he was appointed Trikala manager.

On 13 January 2018, he returned to PAOK after being appointed as a scout, working for Ľuboš Micheľ in finding young Greek talents.

== Career statistics ==
Appearances and goals by club, season and competition
Club	Season	League			Cup		Europe		Total	
Club	Season	Division	Apps	Goals	Apps	Goals	Apps	Goals	Apps	Goals
Doxa Drama	1990–91	Alpha Ethniki	31	7			–		31	7
Doxa Drama	1991–92	Alpha Ethniki	33	5			–		33	5
Doxa Drama	1992–93	Alpha Ethniki	13	5			–		13	5
Doxa Drama	Total		77	17						
Panathinaikos	1992–93	Alpha Ethniki	21	4					21	4
Panathinaikos	1993–94	Alpha Ethniki	31	6			4	2	35	8
Panathinaikos	1994–95	Alpha Ethniki	30	10			4	0	35	10
Panathinaikos	1995–96	Alpha Ethniki	31	10			8	1	39	11
Panathinaikos	1996–97	Alpha Ethniki	31	9			2	1	34	10
Panathinaikos	1997–98	Alpha Ethniki	32	21			–		32	21
Panathinaikos	Total		176	60						
Newcastle United	1998–99	Premier League	10	0	2	1	–		12	1
PAOK	1999–2000	Alpha Ethniki	26	5	4	2	2	2	32	9
PAOK	2000–01	Alpha Ethniki	26	8	11	6	2	0	39	14
PAOK	2001–02	Alpha Ethniki	25	15	5	2	6	0	36	17
PAOK	2002–03	Alpha Ethniki	28	14	9	3	6	1	43	18
PAOK	Total		105	42	29	13	16	3	150	58
Olympiacos	2003–04	Alpha Ethniki	28	6	7	3	6	0	41	9
Olympiacos	2004–05	Alpha Ethniki	16	3	0	0	5	0	21	3
Olympiacos	Total		44	9	7	3	11	0	62	12
Iraklis	2005–06	Alpha Ethniki	22	5	0	0	–		22	5
Iraklis	2006–07	Alpha Ethniki	14	1	2	0	2	0	18	1
Iraklis	Total		36	6	2	0	2	0	40	6
PAOK	2006–07	Alpha Ethniki	13	1	1	0	–		14	1
PAOK	2007–08	Alpha Ethniki	25	2	1	0	–		26	2
PAOK	Total		38	3	2	0	0	0	40	3
Career total			486	137	42	17	49	7	577	161

== Managerial statistics ==
As of 16 January 2017

Team	From	To	Record				
Team	From	To	G	W	D	L	Win %
Greece U19	1 July 2009	30 June 2010	4	2	2	0	50.00
Greece U21	21 January 2010	1 June 2012	19	10	2	7	52.63
PAOK	29 April 2013	14 June 2013	6	3	0	3	50.00
PAOK	3 March 2014	30 June 2014	16	8	4	4	50.00
PAOK	16 March 2015	30 June 2015	13	4	4	5	30.77
Veria	1 July 2015	19 January 2016	23	6	8	9	26.09
Trikala	5 September 2016	16 January 2017	13	5	4	4	38.46
Career totals			94	38	24	32	40.43

== Honours ==
Panathinaikos

- Super League Greece: 1994–95, 1995–96
- Greek Cup: 1992–93, 1993–94, 1994–95
- Greek Super Cup: 1993, 1994

PAOK

- Greek Cup: 2000–01, 2002–03

Olympiacos

- Super League Greece: 2004–05
- Greek Cup: 2004–05

Greece

- UEFA European Championship: 2004

Individual

- Greek Footballer of the Year: 1995
- Greek Cup final MVP: 2003
