= Neapoli Stadium =

Football stadium in Nikea, Piraeus, Greece

Coordinates: 37°58′37.64″N 23°38′6.00″E

- Interactive map of Neapoli Stadium
- Location: Nikaia, Attica, Greece
- Owner: Municipality of Nikaia-Agios Ioannis Renti
- Capacity: 5,500
- Surface: Grass

Tenants
- Ionikos; A.E. Kifisia (2025–2026)

Neapoli Stadium is a football stadium in Nikea, Piraeus, Attica.

The stadium was completed in 1965, and currently has a seating capacity of 5,500.

The stadium is mostly used for football matches and is the home stadium of Ionikos.

Record attendance is 6,565 for a match against Olympiacos in 1990. On June 13, 2009, it was also used as the field for the Rugby Sevens' finals of the Hellenic Rugby Federation.

== Members Club ==
While Ionikos was competing in the lower divisions there were two main supporters' groups—the Association of Ionikos Nikaias Supporters and the Fan Club of Agios Georgios.
