= Vangelis Koutsopoulos =

Greek footballer

Personal information
- Full name: Evangelos Koutsopoulos
- Date of birth: 2 February 1980 (age 46)
- Place of birth: Karditsa, Greece
- Height: 1.76 m (5 ft 9 1/2 in)
- Positions: Defender; left back

Youth career
- –1997: Iraklis Sofadon

Senior career*
Years	Team	Apps	(Gls)
1997–1998	Naoussa		
1998–1999	Anagennisi Karditsa	14	(1)
1999	Paniliakos	1	(0)
1999–2001	Leonidio	51	(2)
2001–2005	PAOK	67	(0)
2005–2009	Panionios	73	(2)
2009–2010	Atromitos	13	(0)
2010–2011	APOEL	9	(0)
2011	AEL Limassol	5	(0)
2011–2013	Levadiakos	28	(0)
2013–2014	PAE Kerkyra	28	(1)
2014–2015	Trikala		
- * Club domestic league appearances and goals

Vangelis Koutsopoulos (Greek: Βαγγέλης Κουτσόπουλος; born 2 February 1980) is a Greek former professional footballer.

== Career ==
Koutsopoulos was born in Karditsa. He played for clubs including PAOK, Panionios, Atromitos, APOEL, and AEL Limassol.

He was a member of the PAOK squad that won the 2002–03 Greek Cup. That season he also scored in the UEFA Cup against Leixões in a 4–1 victory.

== Personal life ==
His brother, Dimitrios is a goalkeeper.

== Honours ==
PAOK

- Greek Cup: 2002–03
