= Kyriakos Tohouroglou =

Greek-Australian footballer

Personal information
- Full name: Kyriakos Nektarios Tohouroglou
- Date of birth: 13 August 1972 (age 54)
- Place of birth: Sydney, Australia
- Height: 1.80 m (5 ft 11 in)
- Position: Goalkeeper

Youth career
- 1981–1983: Gladesville Ryde Magic

Senior career*
Years	Team	Apps	(Gls)
1992–1994	Doxa Drama	51	(0)
1994–1996	Olympiacos	17	(0)
1996–1997	Paniliakos	32	(0)
1997–2000	Olympiacos	38	(0)
2000–2008	PAOK	100	(0)
2011–2024	Gladesville Ryde Magic	276	(11)
Total		514	(11)
- * Club domestic league appearances and goals

Kyriakos Nektarios Tohouroglou (Greek: Κυριάκος Τοχούρογλου; alternatively spelt Tochouroglou) is a Greek-Australian former football player who played as a goalkeeper.

== Biography ==
Tohouroglou was born on 13 August 1972 in Sydney to parents from Greece. He joined his family when they returned to Greece in 1983. He played at three Greek teams as head goalkeeper and was goalkeeper coach at another. .

== Playing career ==
Tohouroglou was signed by Greek First Division team Doxa Drama in 1991. After two and a half years in Drama he moved to Olympiacos for the 1994/95 season. In 1996, he joined Paniliakos F.C.

Rejoining Olympiakos in 1997 Tohouroglou played 32 matches in his first season. He played six UEFA Champions League and two UEFA Cup matches for Olympiakos.

In 2000 Tohouroglou moved to PAOK Playing at PAOK he was part of the Greek Football Cup winning team in 2001 and 2003. After playing for 8 years at PAOK, he proceeded to acquire his coaching diploma.

He did his apprenticeship in Xanthi with the first team of "Skoda Xanthi" as goalkeepers coach and as assistant coach in 2008 where he stayed for two years until 2010.

In 2011 Tohouroglou returned to Australia to be a goalkeeper/concrete tester once again at the team in which he began his football career as a child, Gladesville Ryde Magic F.C., while at the same time coaching in Olympiakos's football academies in Sydney. He has been voted goalkeeper of the year for four consecutive seasons (2012 to 2015) and player of the year in 2012 and also won the NSW State League 1 Championship in 2012. In 2018, Tohouroglou was voted Goalkeeper of the Year for the 5th time in his career in Australia.

== Honours ==
=== Club ===
Olympiakos

- Alpha Ethniki: (3) 1997–98, 1998–99, 1999–2000
- Greek Cup: (1) 1998–99

PAOK

- Greek Cup: (2) 2000–01, 2002–03

Gladesville Ryde Magic

- State League 1 NSW Champions: 2012

=== Individual ===
Gladesville Ryde Magic

- Goalkeeper of the year: 2012, 2013, 2014, 2015, 2018, 2019
- Player of the year: 2012
