= Loukas Karadimos =

Greek footballer and manager

Personal information
- Date of birth: 6 August 1974 (age 52)
- Place of birth: Livadia, Greece
- Height: 1.75 m (5 ft 9 in)
- Position: Defensive midfielder

Team information
- Current team: Aris Voula (manager)

Senior career*
Years	Team	Apps	(Gls)
1990–1998	Kallithea	165	(17)
1998–1999	Kavala	27	(5)
1999–2005	PAOK	107	(3)
2005–2006	Atromitos	23	(0)
2006–2007	Kerkyra	23	(1)
2007–2011	Kallithea	86	(10)
Total		431	(36)

Managerial career
- 2011–2012: Kallithea (technical director)
- 2012: AEL Kalloni (technical director)
- 2012–2013: AEL Kalloni (caretaker)
- 2013–2016: Kallithea (technical director)
- 2015–2016: Kallithea
- 2016–2017: Atromitos (assistant)
- 2017: Ionikos
- 2017–2018: Proodeftiki
- 2018–2019: Ethnikos Piraeus
- 2019: Egaleo
- 2019–2020: Kallithea
- 2020–2021: Marko
- 2021–2022: Fostiras
- 2023: Aris Petroupolis
- 2023–2024: Keratea
- 2024–2025: Acharnaikos
- 2025–: Aris Voula
- * Club domestic league appearances and goals

Loukas Karadimos (Greek: Λουκάς Καραδήμος, born 6 August 1974) is a Greek professional football manager and former player.

In 2024, he was named the head coach at Acharnaikos F.C.
