= Slađan Spasić =

Serbian footballer (born 1973)

Personal information
- Full name: Slađan Spasić
- Date of birth: 15 June 1973 (age 53)
- Place of birth: Norrköping, Sweden
- Height: 1.74 m (5 ft 9 in)
- Position: Attacking midfielder

Youth career
- Radnik Surdulica

Senior career*
Years	Team	Apps	(Gls)
- Dinamo Vranje
1995–1997	Obilić	42	(9)
1997	Sloga Kraljevo		
1998	Borac Čačak	4	(2)
1998–2000	Železnik	51	(13)
2000–2005	PAOK	87	(22)
2005–2006	Larissa	16	(1)
2006	Niki Volos	6	(0)
2007	Olympiakos Nicosia	11	(2)
Total		217+	(49+)
- * Club domestic league appearances and goals

Slađan Spasić (Serbian Cyrillic: Слађан Спасић; born 15 June 1973) is a Serbian former professional footballer who played as an attacking midfielder.

== Career ==
In 1995, Spasić joined FR Yugoslavia Cup runners-up Obilić. He played two qualifier games in the 1995–96 UEFA Cup Winners' Cup. After brief stints at Sloga Kraljevo and Borac Čačak, Spasić signed with First League of FR Yugoslavia club Železnik in 1998. He was the team's joint top scorer in 1999–2000 with 12 goals.

Between 2000 and 2005, Spasić spent five seasons at PAOK, winning two Greek Cups (2001 and 2003). He played 87 games and scored 22 goals for the club in the top flight.

== Honours ==
PAOK

- Greek Cup: 2000–01, 2002–03
