= Guy Feutchine =

Cameroonian footballer (born 1976)

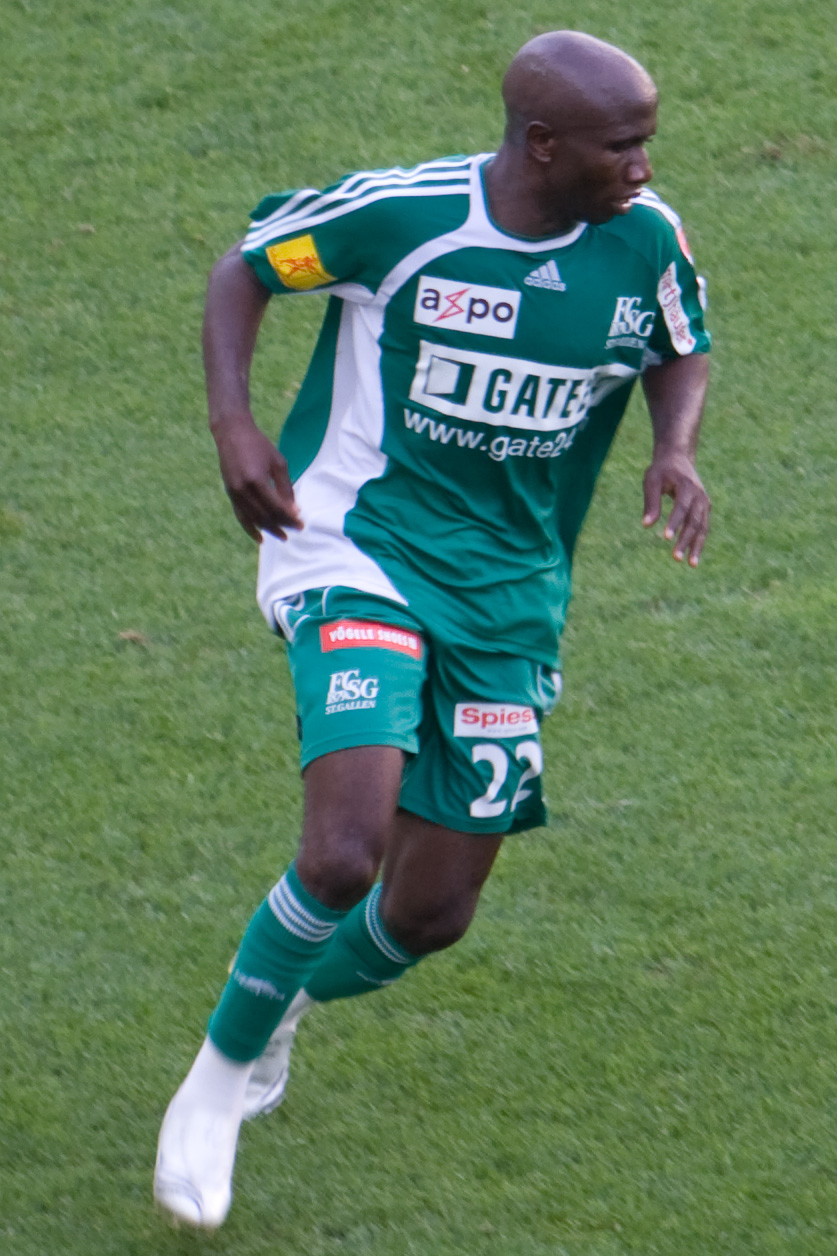
- Feutchine with St. Gallen in July 2007

Personal information
- Full name: Guy Armand Feutchine
- Date of birth: 18 November 1976 (age 49)
- Place of birth: Douala, Cameroon
- Height: 1.70 m (5 ft 7 in)
- Position: Midfielder

Senior career*
Years	Team	Apps	(Gls)
1994–1996	Union Douala		
1996–1997	Wisła Kraków	21	(3)
1997–1998	Cracovia	20	(1)
1998–2001	PAS Giannina	76	(10)
2001–2006	PAOK	95	(10)
2006–2008	St. Gallen	33	(1)
2008–2009	Diagoras Rodou	6	(0)
2009–2010	Colmar	14	(1)
2010–2013	Kapaz	74	(5)
2013	Kallithea	15	(0)
Total		354	(31)

International career
2001–2007	Cameroon	20	(2)

Managerial career
- 2018–2019: Irodotos
- 2021–2022: AO Trikala (assistant)
- 2022–2025: Cameroon U23
- 2025: Panargiakos
- * Club domestic league appearances and goals

Guy Armand Feutchine (French pronunciation: [gi futʃine]; born 18 November 1976) is a Cameroonian professional football manager and former player who played as a midfielder.

== Club career ==
Born in Douala, Feutchine started his career at Union Douala in 1994, before moving to Polish side Wisła Kraków in 1996. After 21 games and three goals in one and a half seasons, Feutchine moved to fellow Kraków club Cracovia for the rest of the 1997–98 season. Feutchine then moved to PAS Giannina in Greece where he won the Beta Ethniki in his second season, before moving to PAOK midway through his third season. Feutchine went on to play for PAOK for five and a half seasons before moving to St. Gallen for two seasons. Feutchine then returned to Greece in the summer of 2008, signing with Diagoras, and after 18 months to French side Colmar for the remainder of the 2009–10 season, winning the 2009–10 Championnat de France amateur Group A. Feutchine left France in the summer of 2010 and signed for Three Time Azerbaijan Premier League champions Kapaz, appearing 78 times for them in all competitions before leaving on 19 January,2013, to return to Greece with Kallithea. He made 15 appearances without scoring or assisting after retiring on 1 July 2013.

== International career ==
Feutchine was a Cameroonian international from 2001 to 2007, and was part of the 2006 Africa Cup of Nations squad, featuring in the 2–0 win over DR Congo. His first goal for Cameroon came in their 2–0 2006 World Cup qualifying win over the Ivory Coast on 4 July 2004. His second goal for Cameroon came in their 3–0 2008 Africa Cup of Nations qualification away victory over Rwanda on 3 September 2006.

== Managing career ==
He managed the Greek club Irodotos from 2018 to 2019. On 7 January 2021, he was appointed as a rehab coach for AO Trikala a club from Greece.

== Career statistics ==
=== Club ===
Appearances and goals by club, season and competition
Club	Season	League			Cup		Continental		Total	
Club	Season	Division	Apps	Goals	Apps	Goals	Apps	Goals	Apps	Goals
Wisła Kraków	1996–97	Ekstraklasa	14	3			—		14	3
Wisła Kraków	1997–98	Ekstraklasa	7	0			—		7	0
Wisła Kraków	Total		21	3			—		21	3
Cracovia	1997–98	I liga	20	1			—		20	1
PAS Giannina	1998–99	Beta Ethniki	33	5			—		33	5
PAS Giannina	1999–2000	Beta Ethniki	31	3			—		31	3
PAS Giannina	2000–01	Alpha Ethniki	12	2			—		12	2
PAS Giannina	Total		76	10			0	0	76	10
PAOK	2000–01	Alpha Ethniki	3	0			—		3	0
PAOK	2001–02	Alpha Ethniki	8	0			5	0	13	0
PAOK	2002–03	Alpha Ethniki	15	0			4	0	19	0
PAOK	2003–04	Alpha Ethniki	27	2			4	0	31	2
PAOK	2004–05	Alpha Ethniki	24	6			3	0	27	6
PAOK	2005–06	Alpha Ethniki	18	2			5	0	23	2
PAOK	Total		95	10			21	0	116	10
St. Gallen	2006–07	Swiss Super League	26	1			—		26	1
St. Gallen	2007–08	Swiss Super League	7	0			—		7	0
St. Gallen	Total		33	1			—		33	1
Diagoras	2008–09	Beta Ethniki	6	0			—		6	0
Colmar	2009–10	CFA	14	1	1	0	—		15	1
Kapaz	2010–11	Azerbaijan Premier League	28	2	1	0	—		29	2
Kapaz	2011–12	Azerbaijan Premier League	29	3	2	0	—		31	3
Kapaz	2012–13	Azerbaijan Premier League	17	0	1	0	—		18	0
Kapaz	Total		74	5	4	0	—		78	5
Kallithea	2012–13	Football League	15	0			—		15	0
Career total			354	31	5	0	21	0	380	31

=== International ===
Appearances and goals by national team and year
National team	Year	Apps	Goals
Cameroon	2001	1	0
Cameroon	2002	1	0
Cameroon	2003	0	0
Cameroon	2004	6	1
Cameroon	2005	3	0
Cameroon	2006	4	1
Cameroon	2007	5	0
Cameroon	Total	20	2

=== International goals ===
Scores and results list Cameroon's goal tally first, score column indicates score after each Feutchine goal.

List of international goals scored by Guy Feutchine
Goal	Date	Opponent	Score	Result	Competition
1.	4 July 2004	Ivory Coast	2–0	2–0	2006 FIFA World Cup qualifiers
2.	3 September 2006	Rwanda	1–0	3–0	2008 Africa Cup of Nations qualifiers

== Honours ==
PAOK

- Greek Cup: 2000–01, 2002–03

Colmar

- Championnat de France amateur: 2009–10 Group A
