= 2008–09 PAOK FC season =

PAOK
2008–09 season
- Chairman: Thodoris Zagorakis
- Manager: Fernando Santos
- Super League Greece: 2nd in regular season, 4th after play-offs
- Greek Cup: Quarter-finals
- Top goalscorer: League: Zlatan Muslimović; Ibrahima Bakayoko (7 each); All: Ibrahima Bakayoko (10 goals)
Home colours	Away colours	Third colours

The 2008–09 season is PAOK FC's 50th consecutive season in the Super League Greece.

== Players ==
=== Squad ===
No.	Name	Nationality	Position (s)	Date of Birth (Age)	Signed from	Notes
Goalkeepers
1	Konstantinos Chalkias	(Greece)	GK	30 May 1974 (aged 35)	(Greece) Aris	
50	Dimitris Rizos	(Greece)	GK	7 October 1976 (aged 32)	(Greece) Doxa Katokopias	
71	Panagiotis Glykos	(Greece)	GK	10 October 1986 (aged 22)	(Greece) Olympiacos Volos	
Defenders
2	Nikos Arabatzis	(Greece)	RB	10 March 1984 (aged 25)	Youth system	
3	Pantelis Konstantinidis	(Greece)	LB	16 August 1975 (aged 33)	(Greece) Panathinaikos	
4	Marcos António	(Brazil)	CB	25 May 1983 (aged 26)	(France) AJ Auxerre	
6	Filipos Darlas	(Greece)	LB	23 October 1983 (aged 25)	(Greece) Panathinaikos	
13	Stelios Malezas	(Greece)	CB	11 March 1985 (aged 24)	Youth system	
15	Pablo Contreras	(Chile)	CB	11 September 1978 (aged 30)	(Portugal) Braga	
16	Lino	(Brazil)	LB, LW	1 June 1977 (aged 32)	(Portugal) Porto	
27	Mirosław Sznaucner	(Poland)	RB / CB	9 September 1979 (aged 29)	(Greece) Iraklis	
34	Vangelis Georgiou	(Greece)	LB, LW	4 November 1988 (aged 20)	Youth system	
80	Joe Bizera	(Uruguay)	CB	17 May 1980 (aged 29)	(Italy) Cagliari	
Midfielders
5	Pablo García	(Uruguay)	DM	11 May 1977 (aged 32)	(Spain) Real Madrid	
8	Stelios Iliadis	(Greece)	DM	3 June 1986 (aged 23)	(Greece) Apollon Kalamarias	
18	Lambros Vangelis	(Greece)	M	10 February 1982 (aged 27)	(Italy) Siena	
20	Vieirinha	(Portugal)	AM / RW / LW	24 January 1986 (aged 23)	(Portugal) Porto	
21	Vladimir Ivic	(Serbia)	AM	7 May 1977 (aged 32)	(Greece) Aris	
22	Ricardo Verón	(Argentina)	DM	22 January 1981 (aged 28)	(Italy) Siena	
23	Vasilios Lakis	(Greece)	RM	10 September 1976 (aged 32)	(Greece) AEK Athens	
24	Olivier Sorlin	(France)	M	9 April 1979 (aged 30)	(France) Stade Rennais	
25	Sotiris Balafas	(Greece)	DM	19 August 1986 (aged 22)	(Greece) Anagennisi Arta	
Forwards
7	Sérgio Conceição	(Portugal)	RW	15 November 1974 (aged 34)	(Kuwait) Al-Qadisiyah FC	
9	Ilias Anastasakos	(Greece)	CF	3 March 1978 (aged 31)	(Greece) Thrasyvoulos	
10	Ibrahima Bakayoko	(Ivory Coast)	CF	31 December 1976 (aged 32)	(Greece) AEL	
11	Zlatan Muslimović	(Bosnia and Herzegovina)	CF	6 March 1981 (aged 28)	(Italy) Atalanta	
28	Stefanos Athanasiadis	(Greece)	CF	24 December 1988 (aged 20)	Youth system	
79	Labros Choutos	(Greece)	W / CF	7 December 1979 (aged 29)	(Greece) Panionios	

Last updated: 31 January 2013
Source: Squad at PAOK FC official website

=== Transfers ===
==== In ====
No.	Pos.	Nat.	Name	Age	EU	Moving from	Type	Transfer window	Ends	Transfer fee	Source
11	FW	(Bosnia and Herzegovina)	Zlatan Muslimović	27		(Italy) Atalanta	Transfer	Summer		0.6M€	
80	CB	(Uruguay)	Joe Bizera	28		(Italy) Cagliari	Transfer	Summer		0.3M€	
50	GK	(Greece)	Dimitris Rizos	31		(Greece) Doxa Katokopias	Free	Summer		Free	
1	GK	(Greece)	Kostas Chalkias	34		(Greece) Aris	Free	Summer		Free	
21	AM	(Serbia)	Vladimir Ivic	31		(Greece) Aris	Free	Summer		Free	
5	DM	(Uruguay)	Pablo García	31		(Spain) Real Madrid	Free	Summer		Free	
6	LB	(Greece)	Filipos Darlas	24		(Greece) Panathinaikos	Loan	Summer		Free	
10	CF	(Ivory Coast)	Ibrahima Bakayoko	31		(Greece) AEL	Free	Summer		Free	
20	AM	(Portugal)	Vieirinha	22		(Portugal) Porto	Loan	Summer		Free	
9	CF	(Greece)	Ilias Anastasakos	30		(Greece) Thrasyvoulos	Free	Summer		Free	
15	CB	(Chile)	Pablo Contreras	29		(Portugal) Braga	Free	Summer		Free	
4	CB	(Brazil)	Marcos António	25		(France) AJ Auxerre	Loan	Summer		Free	
	MF	(Greece)	Chousein Moumin	21		(Greece) Panserraikos	End of loan	Summer		Free	
79	CF	(Greece)	Labros Choutos	29		(Greece) Panionios	Transfer	Winter		0.15M€	
24	MF	(France)	Olivier Sorlin	29		(France) Stade Rennais	Loan	Winter		0.15M€	
16	LB	(Brazil)	Lino	31		(Portugal) Porto	Free	Winter		Free	
	DF	(Greece)	Aristotelis Karasalidis	17		PAOK U20	Free	Winter		Free	

Total spending: ▼€1.20M

==== Out ====
No.	Pos.	Nat.	Name	Age	EU	Moving to	Type	Transfer window	Transfer fee	Source
30	CB	(Croatia)	Goran Gavrančić	29		(Ukraine) Dynamo Kyiv	End of loan	Summer	Free	
33	GK	(Greece)	Kyriakos Tohouroglou	35			End of career	Summer		
43	AM	(Greece)	Georgios Georgiadis	36			End of career	Summer		
24	LB	(Nigeria)	Ifeanyi Udeze	27			End of career	Summer		
10	AM	(Greece)	Christodoulopoulos	21		(Greece) Panathinaikos	Transfer	Summer	2.2M€	
45	CB	(Greece)	Christos Melissis	25		(Greece) Panathinaikos	Transfer	Summer	1.8M€	
1	GK	(Portugal)	Daniel Fernandes	24		(Germany) Bochum	Transfer	Summer	1.1M€	
14	FW	(Serbia)	Ivica Iliev	28		(Germany) Cottbus	Free	Summer	Free	
21	DF	(Brazil)	Agenaldo Baiano	24		(Brazil) SE Gama	Free	Summer	Free	
44	CB	(Netherlands)	Ruud Knol	27		(Netherlands) Sparta Rotterdam	Free	Summer	Free	
19	AM	(Spain)	Toni González	26		(Greece) Ionikos	Free	Summer	Free	
31	GK	(Greece)	Kostas Paliouras	20		(Greece) AE Alexandrias	Free	Summer	Free	
29	CF	(South Africa)	Glen Salmon	30		(South Africa) SuperSport United	Free	Summer	Free	
4	LB	(Cyprus)	Elias Charalambous	27		(Cyprus) Omonia	Free	Summer	Free	
16	CF	(Greece)	Dimitrios Orfanos	25		(Greece) Ergotelis	Free	Summer	Free	
26	MF	(Greece)	Stelios Delibasis	20		(Greece) Agrotikos Asteras	Loan	Summer	Free	
95	DF	(Greece)	Panagiotis Kourdakis	19		(Greece) Thermaikos	Loan	Summer	Free	
66	CF	(Greece)	Stavros Tsoulakos	20		(Greece) Olympiacos Volos	Loan	Summer	Free	
88	MF	(Greece)	Giannis Pechlivanis	20		(Greece) Agrotikos Asteras	Loan	Summer	Free	
46	MF	(Greece)	Chousein Moumin	21		(Greece) Panetolikos	Loan	Summer	Free	
40	GK	(Greece)	Dimitris Kyriakidis	21		(Greece) Agrotikos Asteras	Loan	Summer	Free	
21	MF	(Greece)	Stavros Tsoukalas	20		(Greece) Doxa Dramas	Loan	Summer	Free	
20	DF	(Greece)	Vangelis Georgiou	20		(Greece) Kavala	Loan	Winter	Free	
66	CF	(Greece)	Stavros Tsoulakos	20		(Greece) Kalamata	Free	Winter	Free	

▲ Total Income: €5.1M

Net income: ▲€3.9M
Last updated: 31 January 2013

== Kit ==
Supplier: Puma
Sponsor(s): DEPA

Home	Away	Third

Source: paokfc.gr

== Competitions ==
=== Overview ===
Competition	Record							
Competition	Pld	W	D	L	GF	GA	GD	Win %
Super League Greece	30	18	9	3	39	16	+23	60.00
Greek Cup	5	2	2	1	3	3	+0	40.00
UEFA play-offs	6	2	0	4	5	9	−4	33.33
Total	41	22	11	8	47	28	+19	53.66

Source: Competitions

== Super League Greece ==
=== League table ===
Pos	Team	Pld	W	D	L	GF	GA	GD	Pts	Qualification or relegation
1	Olympiacos (C)	30	22	5	3	50	14	+36	71	Qualification for the Champions League third qualifying round
2	PAOK	30	18	9	3	39	16	+23	63	Qualification for the Play-offs
3	Panathinaikos	30	17	10	3	51	18	+33	61	Qualification for the Play-offs
4	AEK Athens	30	14	13	3	40	24	+16	55	Qualification for the Play-offs
5	AEL	30	12	13	5	36	26	+10	49	Qualification for the Play-offs

Source: Super League Greece
Rules for classification: 1) Points; 2) Head-to-head points; 3) Head-to-head goal difference; 4) Play-offs (neutral ground).
(Note: Criterion 4 is only used if needed to decide champion, teams for relegation or teams for UEFA competitions).
(C) Champions

According to the official Super League playoff regulation, the position after the playoffs replaces the regular season position.

=== Results summary ===
Overall								Home						Away					
Pld	W	D	L	GF	GA	GD	Pts	W	D	L	GF	GA	GD	W	D	L	GF	GA	GD
30	18	9	3	39	16	+23	63	11	4	0	23	5	+18	7	5	3	16	11	+5

Last updated: 31 May 2009.
Source: Competitive matches

=== Results by round ===
Round	1	2	3	4	5	6	7	8	9	10	11	12	13	14	15	16	17	18	19	20	21	22	23	24	25	26	27	28	29	30
Ground	A	H	A	H	A	H	H	A	H	A	H	A	H	H	A	H	A	H	A	H	A	A	H	A	H	A	H	A	A	H
Result	W	D	W	W	D	D	W	D	W	L	W	W	D	W	D	W	L	W	D	W	L	W	W	W	D	D	W	W	W	W
Position	3	3	2	3	3	3	2	3	2	2	2	2	2	2	2	2	3	3	2	2	3	3	3	2	3	3	3	3	2	2

Source: League matches
A = Away; H = Home; W = Win; D = Draw; L = Loss

=== Matches ===
Win Draw Loss

30 August 2008 1	OFI	0–2	PAOK	Heraklion
19:00 EET	Manager: (Czech Republic) František Straka	Report	8' Marcos António; 41' Sérgio Conceição Manager: (Portugal) Fernando Santos	Stadium: Theodoros Vardinogiannis Stadium; Referee: Dimitrios Kyrkos

14 September 2008 2	PAOK	1–1	AEK Athens	Thessaloniki
21:15 EET	Zlatan Muslimović 14' Manager: (Portugal) Fernando Santos	Report	45' Ismael Blanco Manager: (Greece) Georgios Donis	Stadium: Toumba Stadium; Attendance: 25.203; Referee: Vasilios Pamporidis

20 September 2008 3	Panthrakikos	0–1	PAOK	Komotini
19:00 EET	Manager: (Belgium) Emilio Ferrera	Report	65' Zlatan Muslimović Manager: (Portugal) Fernando Santos	Stadium: Komotini Municipal Stadium; Referee: Georgios Stathopoulos

28 September 2008 4	PAOK	1–0	Aris	Thessaloniki
21:15 EET	Pablo Contreras 68' Manager: (Portugal) Fernando Santos	Report	Manager: (Spain) Quique Hernández	Stadium: Toumba Stadium; Attendance: 26.019; Referee: Lazaros Polatian

4 October 2008 5	Ergotelis	0–0	PAOK	Heraklion
19:00 EET	Manager: (Greece) Nikos Karageorgiou	Report	Manager: (Portugal) Fernando Santos	Stadium: Pankritio Stadium; Referee: Georgios Daloukas

16 October 2008 6	PAOK	0–0	Panathinaikos	Thessaloniki
19:00 EET	Manager: (Portugal) Fernando Santos	Report	Manager: (Netherlands) Henk ten Cate	Stadium: Toumba Stadium; Attendance: 25.795; Referee: Dimitrios Kyrkos

25 October 2008 7	PAOK	3–1	Levadiakos	Thessaloniki
19:00 EET	Zlatan Muslimović 13', 52'; Ibrahima Bakayoko 19' Manager: (Portugal) Fernando Santos	Report	90' Eduardo Montoya Manager: (Serbia) Momčilo Vukotić	Stadium: Toumba Stadium; Attendance: 13.973; Referee: Evangelos Katsidonis

2 November 2008 8	Iraklis	1–1	PAOK	Thessaloniki
19:15 EET	Serge Dié 4' (pen.) Manager: (Spain) Ángel Pedraza	Report	71' Stelios Malezas Manager: (Portugal) Fernando Santos	Stadium: Kaftanzoglio Stadium; Referee: Konstantinos Papastamatis

8 November 2008 9	PAOK	2–0	Panionios	Thessaloniki
19:00 EET	Vladimir Ivic 36' (pen.); Zlatan Muslimović 90' Manager: (Portugal) Fernando Santos	Report	Manager: (Germany) Ewald Lienen	Stadium: Toumba Stadium; Attendance: 16.500; Referee: Vasilios Pamporidis

16 November 2008 10	Olympiacos	2–0	PAOK	Piraeus
19:00 EET	Christos Patsatzoglou 44'; Diogo 90' Manager: (Spain) Ernesto Valverde	Report	Manager: (Portugal) Fernando Santos	Stadium: Karaiskakis Stadium; Referee: Anastasios Kakos

23 November 2008 11	PAOK	1–0	AEL	Thessaloniki
19:00 EET	Ibrahima Bakayoko 74' Manager: (Portugal) Fernando Santos	Report	Manager: (Greece) Marinos Ouzounidis	Stadium: Toumba Stadium; Attendance: 15.728; Referee: Michalis Koukoulakis

29 November 2008 12	Thrasyvoulos	1–2	PAOK	Fyli
16:45 EET	Alves 85' Manager: (Greece) Sakis Tsiolis	Report	56' Sérgio Conceição; 90' Stefanos Athanasiadis Manager: (Portugal) Fernando Santos	Stadium: Fyli Municipal Stadium; Referee: Georgios Daloukas

7 December 2008 13	PAOK	1–1	Asteras Tripoli	Thessaloniki
16:45 EET	Ilias Anastasakos 16' Manager: (Portugal) Fernando Santos	Report	61' Danijel Cesarec Manager: (Portugal) Carlos Carvalhal	Stadium: Toumba Stadium; Attendance: 15.892; Referee: Nathanail Charalampidis

13 December 2008 14	PAOK	1–0	Xanthi	Thessaloniki
19:00 EET	Ibrahima Bakayoko 62' Manager: (Portugal) Fernando Santos	Report	Manager: (Greece) Georgios Paraschos	Stadium: Toumba Stadium; Attendance: 12.441; Referee: Georgios Stathopoulos

20 December 2008 15	Panserraikos	1–1	PAOK	Serres
16:45 EET	Sotiris Konstantinidis 55' Manager: (Belgium) Hugo Broos	Report	7' Ilias Anastasakos Manager: (Portugal) Fernando Santos	Stadium: Serres Municipal Stadium; Referee: Nikitas Datis

4 January 2009 16	PAOK	2–0	OFI	Thessaloniki
16:45 EET	Zlatan Muslimović 34'; Vladimir Ivic 42' Manager: (Portugal) Fernando Santos	Report	Manager: (Greece) Giannis Matzourakis	Stadium: Toumba Stadium; Attendance: 13.100; Referee: Lazaros Polatian

11 January 2009 17	AEK Athens	1–0	PAOK	Athens
20:15 EET	Rafik Djebbour 45' Manager: (Bosnia and Herzegovina) Dušan Bajević	Report	Manager: (Portugal) Fernando Santos	Stadium: Olympic Stadium; Referee: Dimitrios Kalopoulos

18 January 2009 18	PAOK	2–0	Panthrakikos	Thessaloniki
19:00 EET	Zlatan Muslimović 30'; Vieirinha 82' Manager: (Portugal) Fernando Santos	Report	Manager: (Belgium) Emilio Ferrera	Stadium: Toumba Stadium; Attendance: 10.590; Referee: Ilias Spathas

25 January 2009 19	Aris	0–0	PAOK	Thessaloniki
19:00 EET	Manager: (Brazil) Mazinho	Report	Manager: (Portugal) Fernando Santos	Stadium: Kleanthis Vikelidis Stadium; Referee: Dimitrios Kyrkos

1 February 2009 20	PAOK	2–0	Ergotelis	Thessaloniki
16:45 EET	Stefanos Athanasiadis 72'; Ilias Anastasakos 78' Manager: (Portugal) Fernando Santos	Report	Manager: (Greece) Nikos Karageorgiou	Stadium: Toumba Stadium; Attendance: 13.203; Referee: Christoforos Zografos

8 February 2009 21	Panathinaikos	3–0	PAOK	Athens
19:00 EET	Loukas Vyntra 49', 55'; Vangelis Mantzios 58' Manager: (Netherlands) Henk ten Cate	Report	Manager: (Portugal) Fernando Santos	Stadium: Leoforos Alexandras Stadium; Referee: Michalis Koukoulakis

14 February 2009 22	Levadiakos	0–3	PAOK	Livadeia
16:45 EET	Manager: (Serbia) Momčilo Vukotić	Report	9' Sérgio Conceição; 51' Olivier Sorlin; 58' (pen.) Vladimir Ivic Manager: (Portugal) Fernando Santos	Stadium: Levadia Municipal Stadium; Referee: Michalis Dakos

21 February 2009 23	PAOK	1–0	Iraklis	Thessaloniki
19:00 EET	Pablo Contreras 79'	Report		Stadium: Toumba Stadium; Attendance: 15.199; Referee: Ilias Spathas

1 March 2009 24	Panionios	1–2	PAOK	Nea Smyrni, Athens
16:45 EET	Luís Lourenço 57' Manager: (Greece) Joti Stamatopoulos	Report	75', 90' Ibrahima Bakayoko Manager: (Portugal) Fernando Santos	Stadium: Nea Smyrni Stadium; Referee: Konstantinos Papastamatis

8 March 2009 25	PAOK	0–0	Olympiacos	Thessaloniki
19:05 EET	Manager: (Portugal) Fernando Santos	Report	Manager: (Spain) Ernesto Valverde	Stadium: Toumba Stadium; Attendance: 27.803; Referee: Anastasios Kakos

14 March 2009 26	AEL	0–0	PAOK	Larissa
16:45 EET	Manager: (Greece) Marinos Ouzounidis	Report	Manager: (Portugal) Fernando Santos	Stadium: AEL FC Arena; Referee: Ilias Spathas

22 March 2009 27	PAOK	2–1	Thrasyvoulos	Thessaloniki
20:00 EET	Manolis Liapakis 46' (o.g.); Ibrahima Bakayoko 90' Manager: (Portugal) Fernando Santos	Report	36' Federico Martorell Manager: (Greece) Sakis Tsiolis	Stadium: Toumba Stadium; Attendance: 8.542; Referee: Georgios Stathopoulos

5 April 2009 28	Asteras Tripoli	0–2	PAOK	Tripoli
19:00 EET	Manager: (Greece) Nikos Kostenoglou	Report	15' Ilias Anastasakos; 80' Sérgio Conceição Manager: (Portugal) Fernando Santos	Stadium: Theodoros Kolokotronis Stadium; Referee: Michalis Dakos

12 April 2009 29	Xanthi	1–2	PAOK	Xanthi
19:00 EET	Victor Agali 61' Manager: (Greece) Panagiotis Goutsidis	Report	22', 90' (pen.) Vladimir Ivic Manager: (Portugal) Fernando Santos	Stadium: Skoda Xanthi Arena; Referee: Dimitrios Kyrkos

26 April 2009 30	PAOK	4–1	Panserraikos	Thessaloniki
19:00 EET	Vladimir Ivic 20' (pen.); Ilias Anastasakos 38'; Ibrahima Bakayoko 73' (pen.); Vasilios Lakis 90' Manager: (Portugal) Fernando Santos	Report	76' Dimitris Anakoglou Manager: (Belgium) Hugo Broos	Stadium: Toumba Stadium; Attendance: 10.672; Referee: Nathanail Charalampidis

=== Play-offs ===
Pos	Team	Pld	W	D	L	GF	GA	GD	Pts	Qualification
2	Panathinaikos	6	5	1	0	12	3	+9	18	Qualification for the Champions League third qualifying round
3	AEK Athens	6	3	2	1	8	6	+2	12	Qualification for the Europa League play-off round
4	PAOK	6	2	0	4	5	9	−4	9	Qualification for the Europa League third qualifying round
5	AEL	6	0	1	5	3	10	−7	1	Qualification for the Europa League second qualifying round

Source: Super League Greece and Worldfootball.net
Rules for classification: 1) points; 2) head-to-head points; 3) head-to-head goal difference; 4) head-to-head goals scored; 5) goal difference; 6) number of goals scored.

==== Matches ====
Win Draw Loss

10 May 2009 1	PAOK	0–1	Panathinaikos	Thessaloniki
19:00 EET	Manager: (Portugal) Fernando Santos	Report	88' Giorgos Karagounis Manager: (Netherlands) Henk ten Cate	Stadium: Toumba Stadium; Attendance: 27.703; Referee: Anastasios Kakos

13 May 2009 2	AEL	0–2	PAOK	Larissa
21:15 EET	Manager: (Greece) Marinos Ouzounidis	Report	9' Ibrahima Bakayoko; 80' Sérgio Conceição Manager: (Portugal) Fernando Santos	Stadium: AEL FC Arena; Referee: Petros Konstantineas

17 May 2009 3	PAOK	0–1	AEK Athens	Thessaloniki
21:15 EET	Manager: (Portugal) Fernando Santos	Report	40' Ismael Blanco Manager: (Bosnia and Herzegovina) Dušan Bajević	Stadium: Toumba Stadium; Attendance: 28.703; Referee: Georgios Daloukas

20 May 2009 4	AEK Athens	3–1	PAOK	Athens
19:00 EET	Rafik Djebbour 9'; Ismael Blanco 39'; Kostas Chalkias 60' (o.g.) Manager: (Bosnia and Herzegovina) Dušan Bajević	Report	35' Vladimir Ivic Manager: (Portugal) Fernando Santos	Stadium: Olympic Stadium; Referee: Anastasios Kakos

24 May 2009 5	Panathinaikos	4–1	PAOK	Athens
21:15 EET	Giorgos Karagounis 36' (pen.); Gabriel Rodrigues 40'; Dimitris Salpingidis 59'; Antonis Petropoulos 90' Manager: (Netherlands) Henk ten Cate	Report	63' Ilias Anastasakos Manager: (Portugal) Fernando Santos	Stadium: Leoforos Alexandras Stadium; Referee: Ilias Spathas

31 May 2009 6	PAOK	1–0	AEL	Thessaloniki
19:00 EET	Ilias Anastasakos 22' Manager: (Portugal) Fernando Santos	Report	Manager: (Greece) Marinos Ouzounidis	Stadium: Toumba Stadium; Attendance: 27.803; Referee: Vasilios Pamporidis

== Greek Football Cup ==
=== Fourth round ===
28 October 2008	Makedonikos	1–2	PAOK	Neapoli, Thessaloniki
14:15	Klokidis 6' Manager: (Greece) Dimitris Kalaitzidis	,	3', 45' Ibrahima Bakayoko Manager: (Portugal) Fernando Santos	Stadium: Makedonikos Stadium

=== Fifth round ===
14 January 2009 Original match	PAOK	0–0	Aris	Thessaloniki
21:10		Report		Stadium: Toumba Stadium; Attendance: 28,701; Referee: Anastasios Kakos

28 January 2009 Replay	Aris	0–0 (a.e.t.) (8–9 p)	PAOK	Thessaloniki
21:00		Report		Stadium: Kleanthis Vikelidis Stadium; Referee: Vasilios Pamporidis

=== Quarterfinals ===
4 February 2009 1st leg	PAOK	1–0	Olympiacos	Thessaloniki
21:10	Sérgio Conceição 30' Manager: (Portugal) Fernando Santos	Report	Manager: (Spain) Ernesto Valverde	Stadium: Toumba Stadium; Attendance: 28.701; Referee: Anastasios Kakos

4 March 2009 2nd leg	Olympiacos	2–0 (a.e.t.) (2–1 agg.)	PAOK	Piraeus
20:15	Diogo 46'; Matt Derbyshire 110' Manager: (Spain) Ernesto Valverde	Report	(red card) 73' Contreras; (red card) 79' Ivic Manager: (Portugal) Fernando Santos	Stadium: Karaiskakis Stadium; Referee: Michalis Koukoulakis

== Statistics ==
=== Squad statistics ===
As of Full season 2008–2009

Appearances denote players in the starting lineup, with the numbers in parentheses denoting appearances as substitute.

No.	Name	Super League		Greek Cup		Play-off		Total	
No.	Name	Apps	Goals	Apps	Goals	Apps	Goals	Apps	Goals
Goalkeepers
1	(Greece) Kostas Chalkias	29	0	4	0	6	0	39	0
71	(Greece) Panagiotis Glykos	1	0	1	0	0	0	2	0
Defenders
2	(Greece) Nikos Arabatzis	11 (2)	0	4 (1)	0	1	0	16 (3)	0
3	(Greece) Pantelis Konstantinidis	16 (7)	0	3 (3)	0	3 (3)	0	22 (13)	0
4	(Brazil) Marcos António	12 (1)	1	4	0	0	0	16 (1)	1
6	(Greece) Filipos Darlas	16 (1)	0	3	0	0	0	19 (1)	0
13	(Greece) Stelios Malezas	24 (2)	1	3	0	5 (1)	0	32 (3)	1
15	(Chile) Pablo Contreras	23	2	3 (1)	0	5	0	31 (1)	2
16	(Brazil) Lino	12	0	3	0	6	0	21	0
27	(Poland) Mirosław Sznaucner	24	0	4	0	5	0	33	0
34	(Greece) Vangelis Georgiou	1 (1)	0	1	0	0	0	2 (1)	0
80	(Uruguay) Joe Bizera	9 (4)	0	3 (2)	0	3	0	15 (6)	0
Midfielders
5	(Uruguay) Pablo García	18 (3)	0	3	0	2	0	23 (3)	0
7	(Portugal) Sérgio Conceição	24	4	3	1	4	1	31	6
8	(Greece) Stelios Iliadis	4 (2)	0	1	0	1	0	6 (2)	0
18	(Greece) Lambros Vangelis	0	0	0	0	1 (1)	0	1 (1)	0
20	(Portugal) Vieirinha	16 (6)	1	0	0	5 (2)	0	21 (8)	1
21	(Serbia) Vladimir Ivic	23 (2)	6	4	0	5	1	32 (2)	7
22	(Argentina) Ricardo Verón	25	0	4 (1)	0	6 (1)	0	35 (2)	0
23	(Greece) Vasilios Lakis	19 (9)	1	1	0	4 (3)	0	24 (12)	1
24	(France) Olivier Sorlin	12	1	3	0	5	0	20	1
25	(Greece) Sotiris Balafas	21 (13)	0	3 (2)	0	2 (1)	0	26 (16)	0
Forwards
9	(Greece) Ilias Anastasakos	12 (3)	5	1	0	4 (1)	2	17 (4)	7
10	(Ivory Coast) Ibrahima Bakayoko	24 (13)	7	3 (1)	2	6 (2)	1	33 (16)	10
11	(Bosnia and Herzegovina) Zlatan Muslimović	22 (1)	7	4 (1)	0	3	0	29 (2)	7
28	(Greece) Stefanos Athanasiadis	9 (9)	2	4 (3)	0	1 (1)	0	14 (13)	2
79	(Greece) Labros Choutos	8 (5)	0	0	0	0	0	8 (5)	0

=== Goalscorers ===
Rank	No.	Pos.	Player	Super League	Cup	Play-off	Total
1	10	FW	(Ivory Coast) Ibrahima Bakayoko	7	2	1	10
2	11	FW	(Bosnia and Herzegovina) Zlatan Muslimović	7	0	0	7
3	21	MF	(Serbia) Vladimir Ivic	6	0	1	7
4	9	FW	(Greece) Ilias Anastasakos	5	0	2	7
5	7	MF	(Portugal) Sérgio Conceição	4	1	1	6
6	28	FW	(Greece) Athanasiadis	2	0	0	2
7	15	MF	(Chile) Pablo Contreras	2	0	0	2
8	20	MF	(Portugal) Vieirinha	1	0	0	1
9	24	MF	(France) Olivier Sorlin	1	0	0	1
10	23	MF	(Greece) Vasilios Lakis	1	0	0	1
11	13	DF	(Greece) Stelios Malezas	1	0	0	1
12	4	DF	(Brazil) Marcos António	1	0	0	1
Own goals				1	0	0	0
TOTALS				39	3	5	47

=== Disciplinary record ===
No.	Pos	Nat	Name	Super League			Greek Cup			Play-off			Total			Notes
No.	Pos	Nat	Name	Yellow card	(yellow card) (yellow-red card)	Red card	Yellow card	(yellow card) (yellow-red card)	Red card	Yellow card	(yellow card) (yellow-red card)	Red card	Yellow card	(yellow card) (yellow-red card)	Red card	Notes
22	MF	(Argentina)	Ricardo Verón	7			2			2			11			
21	MF	(Serbia)	Vladimir Ivic	7			1	1		1			9	1		
6	DF	(Greece)	Filipos Darlas	7			2						9			
11	FW	(Bosnia and Herzegovina)	Zlatan Muslimović	6			1			2			9			
24	MF	(France)	Olivier Sorlin	4			3				1		7	1		
7	MF	(Portugal)	Sérgio Conceição	5		1				1			6		1	
25	MF	(Greece)	Sotiris Balafas	4			2	1					6	1		
27	DF	(Poland)	Mirosław Sznaucner	4			1			1			6			
5	MF	(Uruguay)	Pablo García	1	2		1					1	2	2	1	
15	DF	(Chile)	Pablo Contreras	2	1			1		1			3	2		
2	DF	(Greece)	Nikos Arabatzis	4						1			5			
20	MF	(Portugal)	Vieirinha	4						1			5			
1	GK	(Greece)	Kostas Chalkias	4						1			5			
10	FW	(Ivory Coast)	Ibrahima Bakayoko	2			1			1			4			
13	DF	(Greece)	Stelios Malezas	4									4			
80	DF	(Uruguay)	Joe Bizera	1		1	1						2		1	
4	DF	(Brazil)	Marcos António	2			1						3			
16	DF	(Brazil)	Lino	2									2			
28	FW	(Greece)	Stefanos Athanasiadis	2									2			
3	DF	(Greece)	Pantelis Konstantinidis	1									1			
23	MF	(Greece)	Vasilios Lakis	1									1			
79	FW	(Greece)	Labros Choutos	1									1			
9	FW	(Greece)	Ilias Anastasakos				1						1			
			TOTAL	75	3	2	17	3	0	12	1	1	104	7	3	

Only competitive matches
Ordered by (red card) , (yellow card) (yellow-red card) and (yellow card)
(yellow card) = Number of bookings; (yellow card) (yellow-red card) = Number of sending offs after a second yellow card; (red card) = Number of sending offs by a direct red card.
0 shown as blank

Source: Match reports in competitive matches, superleaguegreece.net
