= 2006–07 PAOK FC season =

PAOK
2006–07 season
- Chairman: Nikolaos Vezyrtzis
- Manager: Ilie Dumitrescu, Momčilo Vukotić, (Greece) Georgios Paraschos
- Stadium: Toumba Stadium
- Super League: 6th
- Greek Cup: Quarter-finals
- Top goalscorer: League: Marcin Mięciel (14); All: Marcin Mięciel (15)
Home colours	Away colours	Third colours

The 2006–07 season was PAOK Football Club’s 81st in existence and the club’s 48th consecutive season in the top flight of Greek football. The team will enter the Greek Football Cup in the Fourth round. PAOK will not be entitled to take part in the 2006–07 UEFA Cup. UEFA has confirmed to the Hellenic Football Federation that it is not in a position to admit PAOK to the competition as the club did not have a fixed licence by the deadline of the end of May 2006.

== Players ==
=== Squad ===
Note: Flags indicate national team as defined under FIFA eligibility rules; some limited exceptions apply. Players may hold more than one non-FIFA nationality.

No.	Pos.	Nation	Player
1	GK	POR	Daniel Fernandes
33	GK	GRE	Kyriakos Tohouroglou
40	GK	GRE	Dimitris Kyriakidis
2	DF	GRE	Nikos Arabatzis
3	DF	GRE	Pantelis Konstantinidis
4	DF	ROU	Cosmin Bărcăuan
5	DF	PER	Miguel Rebosio
15	DF	GRE	Stelios Malezas
16	DF	BRA	Índio
22	DF	GRE	Giannis Voskopoulos
23	DF	GRE	Dionysis Chasiotis
30	DF	GRE	Konstantinos Manousaridis
44	DF	CYP	Elias Charalambous
45	DF	GRE	Christos Melissis
77	DF	EGY	Amir Azmy
6	MF	PER	Carlos Zegarra
7	MF	GRE	Theodoros Zagorakis

No.	Pos.	Nation	Player
8	MF	GRE	Stelios Iliadis
9	MF	CYP	Constantinos Charalambidis
10	MF	ESP	Toni González
18	MF	GRE	Lambros Vangelis
24	MF	GRE	Giannis Pechlivanis
25	MF	GRE	Sotiris Balafas
27	MF	GRE	Stelios Delibasis
32	MF	SRB	Nenad Stojaković
43	MF	GRE	Georgios Georgiadis
46	MF	GRE	Chousein Moumin
52	MF	BRA	Piá
11	FW	CYP	Yiasoumis Yiasoumi
14	FW	GRE	Lazaros Christodoulopoulos
20	FW	POL	Marcin Mięciel
28	FW	GRE	Stefanos Athanasiadis
29	FW	HUN	Sándor Torghelle
31	FW	GRE	Athanasios Tsigas

== Transfers ==
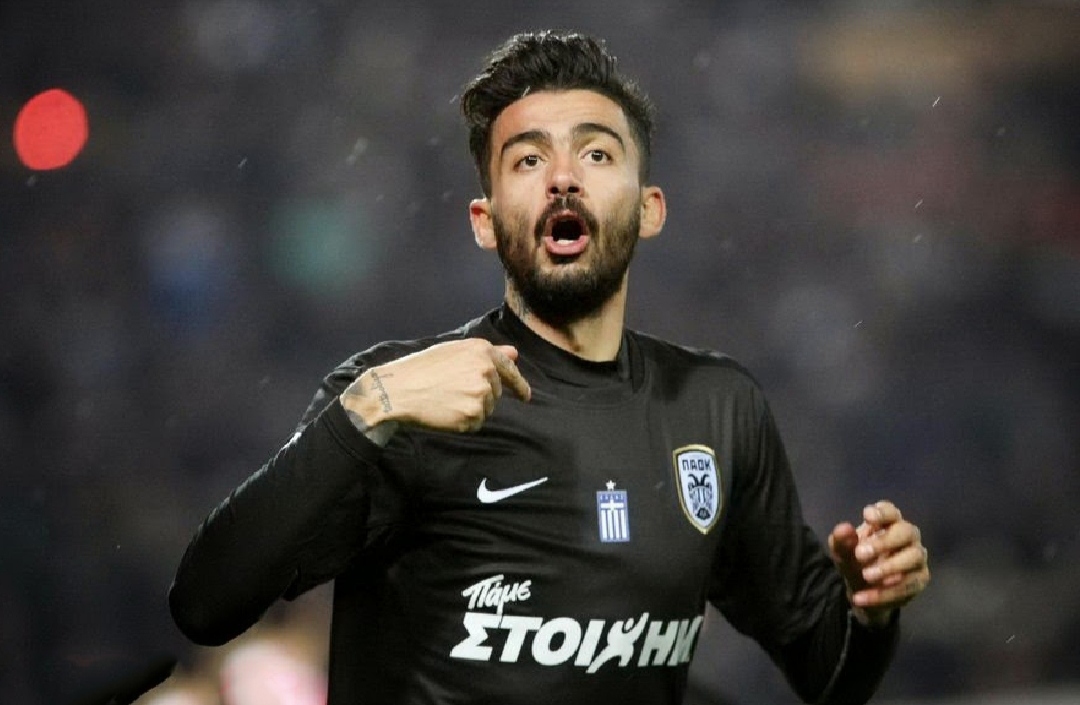
Stefanos klaus Athanasiadis make his debuted with the first team on 24 February 2007 in a home match against AEL

Players transferred in

Transfer Window	Pos.	Name	Club	Fee
Summer	DF	(Brazil) Índio	(South Korea) Daegu FC	Free
Summer	DF	(Romania) Cosmin Bărcăuan	(Ukraine) Shakhtar Donetsk	Free (Loan)
Summer	MF	(Spain) Toni González	(Spain) Mallorca	Free
Summer	FW	(Greece) Athanasios Tsigas	(Greece) Panathinaikos	Free (Loan)
Summer	FW	(Hungary) Sándor Torghelle	(Greece) Panathinaikos	Free
Summer	DF	(Peru) Miguel Rebosio	(Peru) Sport Boys	Free (Loan)
Summer	MF	(Cyprus) K. Charalambidis	(Greece) Panathinaikos	Free (Loan)
Summer	MF	(Serbia) Nenad Stojaković	(Serbia) Banat Zrenjanin	Free
Summer	MF	(Peru) Carlos Zegarra	(Peru) Sporting Cristal	Free
Summer	FW	(Greece) Athanasiadis	(Greece) PAOK U20	Free
Summer	MF	(Greece) Stelios Delibasis	(Greece) PAOK U20	Free
Summer	DF	(Greece) Giannis Voskopoulos	(Greece) PAOK U20	Free
Summer	MF	(Greece) Stavros Tsoukalas	(Greece) PAOK U20	Free
Winter	MF	(Brazil) Piá	(Brazil) União São João	Free
Winter	DF	(Greece) Georgios Georgiadis	(Greece) Iraklis	Free

Players transferred out

Transfer Window	Pos.	Name	Club	Fee
Summer	FW	(Greece) Dimitris Salpingidis	(Greece) Panathinaikos	1.8M€
Summer	MF	(Egypt) Shikabala	(Egypt) Zamalek	990k€
Summer	FW	(Greece) Christos Karipidis	(Scotland) Hearts	450K€
Summer	MF	(Cameroon) Guy Feutchine	(Switzerland) St. Gallen	Free
Summer	MF	(Cyprus) Panagiotis Engomitis	(Cyprus) Ethnikos Achna	Free
Summer	DF	(Nigeria) Ifeanyi Udeze	(Greece) AEK Athens	Free
Summer	MF	(Greece) Christos Maladenis	(Greece) Levadiakos	Free
Winter	DF	(Egypt) Amir Azmy	(Saudi Arabia) Al-Shabab	600K€
Winter	DF	(Greece) Dionysis Chasiotis	(Greece) Kastoria	Free
Winter	MF	(Peru) Carlos Zegarra	(Peru) Alianza Lima	Free
Winter	MF	(Brazil) Piá	(Brazil) União São João	Free
Winter	DF	(Peru) Miguel Rebosio	(Peru) Sport Boys	End of loan
Winter	MF	(Cyprus) K. Charalambidis	(Greece) Panathinaikos	End of loan
Winter	FW	(Greece) Athanasios Tsigas	(Greece) Panathinaikos	End of loan

== Competitions ==
=== Overview ===
Competition	Record							
Competition	Pld	W	D	L	GF	GA	GD	Win %
Super League Greece	30	13	6	11	32	29	+3	43.33
Greek Cup	4	3	0	1	5	4	+1	75.00
Total	34	16	6	12	37	33	+4	47.06

Last updated: 5 February 2017.
Source: Competitions

=== Managerial statistics ===
Head coach	From	To	Record							
Head coach	From	To	G	W	D	L	GF	GA	GD	Win %
(Romania) Ilie Dumitrescu	Start Season	03.10.2006	6	2	2	2	6	6	+0	33.33
(Greece) Stavros Sarafis (Interim)	03.10.2006	12.10.2006	0	0	0	0	0	0	+0	—
(Serbia) Momčilo Vukotić	13.10.2006	22.01.2007	15	8	2	5	17	12	+5	53.33
(Greece) Georgios Paraschos	22.01.2007	End season	13	6	2	5	14	15	−1	46.15

== Super League Greece ==
=== League table ===
Pos	Team	Pld	W	D	L	GF	GA	GD	Pts	Qualification or relegation
4	Aris	30	11	13	6	32	26	+6	46	Qualification for the UEFA Cup first round
5	Panionios	30	12	9	9	33	31	+2	45 (Note: Head-to-head record: PAOK–Panionios 1–1, Panionios–PAOK 3–1.)	Qualification for the UEFA Cup first round
6	PAOK	30	13	6	11	32	29	+3	45	
7	OFI	30	12	6	12	41	45	−4	42	Qualification for the Intertoto Cup third round (Note: PAOK turned down entry to the Intertoto Cup allowing OFI to accept the bid from Greece.)
8	Atromitos	30	10	10	10	40	44	−4	40	

Source: Super League Greece
Rules for classification: 1st points; 2nd head-to-head points; 3rd head-to-head goal difference; 4th decision match.

==== Results summary ====
Overall								Home						Away					
Pld	W	D	L	GF	GA	GD	Pts	W	D	L	GF	GA	GD	W	D	L	GF	GA	GD
30	13	6	11	32	29	+3	45	10	2	3	22	13	+9	3	4	8	10	16	−6

Last updated: 13 May 2007.
Source: Competitive matches

==== Results by round ====
Round	1	2	3	4	5	6	7	8	9	10	11	12	13	14	15	16	17	18	19	20	21	22	23	24	25	26	27	28	29	30
Ground	A	H	A	H	A	H	A	A	H	A	H	A	H	H	A	H	A	H	A	H	A	H	H	A	H	A	H	A	A	H
Result	D	W	L	W	L	D	D	W	W	W	W	L	D	L	L	W	L	L	D	W	L	W	L	D	W	W	W	L	L	W
Position	4	2	7	4	8	8	9	5	5	4	4	4	4	4	4	4	4	5	5	5	5	4	5	5	5	4	4	6	6	6

Source: League matches
A = Away; H = Home; W = Win; D = Draw; L = Loss

==== Matches ====
Win Draw Loss

19 August 2006 1	AEK Athens	0–0	PAOK	Athens
19:00 EET	Manager: (Spain) Lorenzo Serra Ferrer		Manager: (Romania) Ilie Dumitrescu	Stadium: Olympic Stadium; Attendance: 23.109; Referee: Iraklis Tsikinis

26 August 2006 2	PAOK	3–1	Iraklis	Thessaloniki
17:00 EET	Marcin Mięciel 27', 47', 64' Manager: (Romania) Ilie Dumitrescu		Esteban Herrera 55' Manager: (Greece) Savvas Kofidis	Stadium: Toumba Stadium; Attendance: 8.745; Referee: Georgios Kasnaferis

9 September 2006 3	Olympiacos	2–0	PAOK	Piraeus
17:00 EET	Michalis Konstantinou 7'; Nery Castillo 29' Manager: (Norway) Trond Sollied		Manager: (Romania) Ilie Dumitrescu	Stadium: Karaiskakis Stadium; Attendance: 29.140; Referee: Athanassios Briakos

16 September 2006 4	PAOK	1–0	Ergotelis	Thessaloniki
19:00 EET	Constantinos Charalambidis 47' Manager: (Romania) Ilie Dumitrescu		Manager: (Greece) Nikos Karageorgiou	Stadium: Toumba Stadium; Attendance: 3.778; Referee: Iraklis Tsikinis

24 September 2006 5	Panathinaikos	2–1	PAOK	Athens
19:00 EET	Andreas Ivanschitz 66'; Dimitrios Salpingidis 89' (pen.) Manager: (Spain) Víctor Muñoz		90' Carlos Zegarra Manager: (Romania) Ilie Dumitrescu	Stadium: Leoforos Alexandras Stadium; Attendance: 21.356; Referee: Vasileios Terovitsas

1 October 2006 6	PAOK	1–1	Apollon Kalamarias	Thessaloniki
17:00 EET	Sotiris Balafas 45' Manager: (Romania) Ilie Dumitrescu		83' Alban Bushi Manager: (Greece) Makis Katsavakis	Stadium: Toumba Stadium; Attendance: 4.892; Referee: Kyros Vassaras

21 October 2006 7	Aris	0–0	PAOK	Thessaloniki
17:00 EET	Manager: (Argentina) Guillermo Hoyos		Manager: (Serbia) Momčilo Vukotić	Stadium: Kleanthis Vikelidis Stadium; Attendance: 13.280; Referee: Kyros Vassaras

29 October 2006 8	AEL	1–2	PAOK	Larissa
14:45 EET	Christian Bassila 45' Manager: (Greece) Georgios Donis		65', 85' Marcin Mięciel Manager: (Serbia) Momčilo Vukotić	Stadium: Alcazar Stadium; Attendance: 7.358; Referee: Konstantinos Finokaliotis

4 November 2006 9	PAOK	1–0	Kerkyra	Thessaloniki
17:00 EET	Stelios Iliadis 40' Manager: (Serbia) Momčilo Vukotić		Manager: (Greece) Babis Tennes	Stadium: Toumba Stadium; Attendance: 2.168; Referee: Michalis Germanakos

11 November 2006 10	Egaleo	0–2	PAOK	Athens
17:00 EET	Manager: (Greece) Georgios Chatzaras		52' Marcin Mięciel; 57' Athanasios Tsigas Manager: (Serbia) Momčilo Vukotić	Stadium: Stavros Mavrothalassitis Stadium; Attendance: 2.059; Referee: Vasileios Terovitsas

19 November 2006 11	PAOK	3–0	Ionikos	Thessaloniki
17:00 EET	Marcin Mięciel 55', 73'; Stelios Iliadis 90' Manager: (Serbia) Momčilo Vukotić		Manager: (Portugal) Augusto Inácio	Stadium: Toumba Stadium; Attendance: 9.949; Referee: Vasileios Arguropoulos

26 November 2006 12	Xanthi	1–0	PAOK	Xanthi
14:45 EET	Vasilis Torosidis 90' Manager: (Greece) Takis Lemonis		Manager: (Serbia) Momčilo Vukotić	Stadium: Xanthi FC Arena; Attendance: 3.860; Referee: Georgios Kasnaferis

3 December 2006 13	PAOK	1–1	Panionios	Thessaloniki
17:00 EET	Marcin Mięciel 33' Manager: (Serbia) Momčilo Vukotić		44' Fanouris Goundoulakis Manager: (Germany) Ewald Lienen	Stadium: Toumba Stadium; Attendance: 11.979; Referee: Lazaros Polatian

10 December 2006 14	PAOK	0–3	Atromitos	Thessaloniki
17:00 EET	Manager: (Serbia) Momčilo Vukotić		11' Georgios Korakakis; 30' Anderson; 90' (pen.) Christos Koutsospyros Manager: (Greece) Georgios Paraschos	Stadium: Toumba Stadium; Attendance: 7.823; Referee: Ilias Mazarakos

17 December 2006 15	OFI	1–0	PAOK	Heraklion
15:00 EET	Metodi Deyanov 54' Manager: (Germany) Reiner Maurer		Manager: (Serbia) Momčilo Vukotić	Stadium: Theodoros Vardinogiannis Stadium; Attendance: 3.032; Referee: Konstantinos Finokaliotis

6 January 2007 16	PAOK	2–0	AEK Athens	Thessaloniki
17:00 EET	Nikos Arabatzis 65'; Marcin Mięciel 73' Manager: (Serbia) Momčilo Vukotić		Manager: (Spain) Lorenzo Serra Ferrer	Stadium: Toumba Stadium; Attendance: 15.686; Referee: Giannis Tsachilidis

14 January 2007 17	Iraklis	1–0	PAOK	Thessaloniki
15:00 EET	Marian Aliuță 64' Manager: (Slovakia) Jozef Bubenko		Manager: (Serbia) Momčilo Vukotić	Stadium: Kaftanzoglio Stadium; Attendance: 9.577; Referee: Konstantinos Finokaliotis

21 January 2007 18	PAOK	2–3	Olympiacos	Thessaloniki
17:00 EET	Marcin Mięciel 29'; Sándor Torghelle 89' Manager: (Serbia) Momčilo Vukotić		57' Vasilis Torosidis; 66' Rivaldo; 70' Nery Castillo Manager: (Greece) Takis Lemonis	Stadium: Toumba Stadium; Attendance: 23.483; Referee: Georgios Kasnaferis

28 January 2007 19	Ergotelis	0–0	PAOK	Heraklion
14:45 EET	Manager: (Greece) Nikos Karageorgiou		Manager: (Greece) Georgios Paraschos	Stadium: Pankritio Stadium; Attendance: 3.140; Referee: Romanos Kontogiannidis

3 February 2007 20	PAOK	2–1	Panathinaikos	Thessaloniki
17:00 EET	Georgios Georgiadis 18'; Sotiris Balafas 55' Manager: (Greece) Georgios Paraschos		35' (pen.) Dimitrios Papadopoulos Manager: (Spain) Víctor Muñoz	Stadium: Toumba Stadium; Attendance: 8.795; Referee: Giannis Tsachilidis

11 February 2007 21	Apollon Kalamarias	3–1	PAOK	Thessaloniki
14:45 EET	Lucas Favalli 47'; Alban Bushi 58'; Dimitrios Orfanos 83' Manager: (Greece) Makis Katsavakis		90' Marcin Mięciel Manager: (Greece) Georgios Paraschos	Stadium: Kalamaria Stadium; Attendance: 2.053; Referee: Vasilios Pamporidis

17 February 2007 22	PAOK	1–0	Aris	Thessaloniki
17:00 EET	Christos Melissis 22' Manager: (Greece) Georgios Paraschos		(penalty missed) 55' Avraam Papadopoulos Manager: (Spain) Quique Hernández	Stadium: Toumba Stadium; Attendance: 10.393; Referee: Georgios Kasnaferis

24 February 2007 23	PAOK	1–3	AEL	Thessaloniki
14:45 EET	Jozef Kožlej 3' (o.g.) Manager: (Greece) Georgios Paraschos		50' Georgios Fotakis; 54' Marco Förster; 68' Jozef Kožlej Manager: (Greece) Georgios Donis	Stadium: Toumba Stadium; Attendance: 4.057; Referee: Vasilios Skoufitsas

4 March 2007 24	Kerkyra	0–0	PAOK	Kerkyra
14:45 EET	Manager: (Greece) Babis Tennes		Manager: (Greece) Georgios Paraschos	Stadium: Kerkyra Stadium; Attendance: 1.200; Referee: Konstantinos Finokaliotis

10 March 2007 25	PAOK	2–0	Egaleo	Thessaloniki
17:00 EET	Elias Charalambous 18'; Kleopas Giannou 45' (o.g.) Manager: (Greece) Georgios Paraschos		Manager: (Greece) Stelios Poulos	Stadium: Toumba Stadium; Attendance: 2.893; Referee: Georgios Kasnaferis

17 March 2007 26	Ionikos	0–2	PAOK	Piraeus
17:00 EET	Manager: (Portugal) Augusto Inácio		Marcin Mięciel 12', 70' Manager: (Greece) Georgios Paraschos	Stadium: Neapoli Stadium; Attendance: 1.423; Referee: Michalis Germanakos

15 April 2007 27	PAOK	1–0	Xanthi	Thessaloniki
17:00 EET	Stelios Iliadis 82' Manager: (Greece) Georgios Paraschos		Manager: (Greece) Nikos Kehagias	Stadium: Toumba Stadium; Referee: Michail Koukoulakis

22 April 2007 28	Panionios	3–1	PAOK	Nea Smyrni, Athens
17:00 EET	Fanouris Goundoulakis 25'; Nikos Spyropoulos 42'; Grigoris Makos 90' Manager: (Germany) Ewald Lienen		90' Yiasemakis Manager: (Greece) Georgios Paraschos	Stadium: Nea Smyrni Stadium

29 April 2007 29	Atromitos	2–1	PAOK	Peristeri, Athens
17:00 EET	Georgios Korakakis 5'; Christos Koutsospyros 57' Manager: (Serbia) Dragan Kokotović		20' Christodoulopoulos Manager: (Greece) Georgios Paraschos	Stadium: Peristeri Stadium; Attendance: 1.638; Referee: Vasileios Terovitsas

13 May 2007 30	PAOK	1–0	OFI	Thessaloniki
17:00 EET	Christodoulopoulos 59' Manager: (Greece) Georgios Paraschos		Manager: (Germany) Reiner Maurer	Stadium: Toumba Stadium; Attendance: 5.721; Referee: Anastasios Kakos

== Greek Cup ==
=== Fourth round ===
7 November 2006	Panserraikos	0–1	PAOK	Serres
18:00	Manager: (Greece) Vasilios Antoniadis	Report	31' Nikos Arabatzis Manager: (Serbia) Momčilo Vukotić	Stadium: Serres Municipal Stadium

=== Fifth round ===
21 December 2006	PAOK	1–0	Ergotelis	Thessaloniki
17:45 EET	Athanasios Tsigas 55' Manager: (Serbia) Momčilo Vukotić	Report	Manager: (Greece) Nikos Karageorgiou	Stadium: Toumba Stadium; Referee: Vasilios Pamporidis

=== Quarter-finals ===
17 January 2007 1st leg	PAOK	2–1	Panathinaikos	Thessaloniki
18:00 EET	Pantelis Konstantinidis 31'; Marcin Mięciel 42' Manager: (Serbia) Momčilo Vukotić	Report	62' Vangelis Mantzios Manager: (Spain) Víctor Muñoz	Stadium: Toumba Stadium; Referee: Anastasios Kakos

31 January 2007 2nd leg	Panathinaikos	3–1 (a.e.t.) (4–3 agg.)	PAOK	Athens
19:00 EET	Andreas Ivanschitz 40'; Vangelis Mantzios 63', 95' Manager: (Spain) Víctor Muñoz	Report	90' Georgios Georgiadis Manager: (Greece) Georgios Paraschos	Stadium: Olympic Stadium; Referee: Georgios Kasnaferis

== Statistics ==
=== Squad statistics ===
As of Full season 2006-2007

Appearances denote players in the starting lineup, with the numbers in parentheses denoting appearances as substitute.

No.	Name	Super League		Greek Cup		Total	
No.	Name	Apps	Goals	Apps	Goals	Apps	Goals
Goalkeepers
1	(Portugal) Daniel Fernandes	29	0	3	0	32	0
33	(Greece) Kyriakos Tohouroglou	1	0	1	0	2	0
Defenders
2	(Greece) Nikos Arabatzis	27 (1)	1	4	1	31 (1)	2
3	(Greece) Pantelis Konstantinidis	24	0	4	1	28	1
4	(Romania) Cosmin Bărcăuan	26	0	4	0	30	0
5	(Peru) Miguel Rebosio	3	0	0	0	3	0
15	(Greece) Stelios Malezas	9 (6)	0	0	0	9 (6)	0
16	(Brazil) Índio	4 (3)	0	0	0	4 (3)	0
23	(Greece) Dionysis Chasiotis	2 (1)	0	1 (1)	0	3 (2)	0
44	(Cyprus) Elias Charalambous	21 (3)	1	4	0	25 (3)	1
45	(Greece) Christos Melissis	30 (1)	1	4	0	34 (1)	1
77	(Egypt) Amir Azmy	9 (1)	0	2	0	11 (1)	0
Midfielders
6	(Peru) Carlos Zegarra	4 (1)	1	0	0	4 (1)	1
7	(Greece) Theodoros Zagorakis	23	0	4	0	27	0
8	(Greece) Stelios Iliadis	23 (4)	3	4	0	27 (4)	3
9	(Cyprus) K. Charalambidis	16 (2)	1	1 (1)	0	17 (3)	1
10	(Spain) Toni González	20 (17)	0	2 (2)	0	22 (19)	0
18	(Greece) Lambros Vangelis	11 (6)	0	0	0	11 (6)	0
25	(Greece) Sotiris Balafas	23 (6)	2	3 (2)	0	26 (8)	2
43	(Greece) Georgios Georgiadis	13 (1)	1	1 (1)	1	14 (2)	2
46	(Greece) Chousein Moumin	15 (7)	0	3	0	18 (7)	0
Forwards
11	(Cyprus) Yiasoumis Yiasoumi	15 (10)	1	1	0	16 (10)	1
14	(Greece) L. Christodoulopoulos	7 (5)	2	0	0	7 (5)	2
20	(Poland) Marcin Mięciel	29	14	3	1	32	15
28	(Greece) Stefanos Athanasiadis	1 (1)	0	0	0	1 (1)	0
29	(Hungary) Sándor Torghelle	24 (9)	1	3 (1)	0	27 (10)	1
31	(Greece) Athanasios Tsigas	7 (4)	1	2 (2)	1	9 (6)	2

=== Goalscorers ===
Rank	No.	Pos.	Player	Super League	Cup	Total
1	20	FW	(Poland) Marcin Mięciel	14	1	15
2	8	MF	(Greece) Stelios Iliadis	3	0	3
3	14	FW	(Greece) Christodoulopoulos	2	0	2
4	25	MF	(Greece) Sotiris Balafas	2	0	2
5	31	FW	(Greece) Athanasios Tsigas	1	1	2
6	43	MF	(Greece) Georgios Georgiadis	1	1	2
7	2	DF	(Greece) Nikos Arabatzis	1	1	2
8	11	FW	(Cyprus) Yiasoumis Yiasoumi	1	0	1
9	29	FW	(Hungary) Sándor Torghelle	1	0	1
10	9	MF	(Cyprus) K. Charalambidis	1	0	1
11	6	DF	(Peru) Carlos Zegarra	1	0	1
12	45	DF	(Greece) Christos Melissis	1	0	1
13	44	DF	(Cyprus) Elias Charalambous	1	0	1
14	3	DF	(Greece) P. Konstantinidis	0	1	1
Own goals				2	0	2
TOTALS				32	5	37

=== Disciplinary record ===
No.	Pos	Nat	Name	Super League			Greek Cup			Total			Notes
No.	Pos	Nat	Name	Yellow card	(yellow card) (yellow-red card)	Red card	Yellow card	(yellow card) (yellow-red card)	Red card	Yellow card	(yellow card) (yellow-red card)	Red card	Notes
44	DF	(Cyprus)	Elias Charalambous	6	1	1		1		6	2	1	
4	DF	(Romania)	Cosmin Bărcăuan	9			1			10			
2	DF	(Greece)	Nikos Arabatzis	7	1					7	1		
7	MF	(Greece)	Theodoros Zagorakis	7			1			8			
25	MF	(Greece)	Sotiris Balafas	8						8			
8	MF	(Greece)	Stelios Iliadis	7						7			
3	DF	(Greece)	P. Konstantinidis	4	1		1			5	1		
29	FW	(Hungary)	Sándor Torghelle	6						6			
77	DF	(Egypt)	Amir Azmy	4	1					4	1		
18	MF	(Greece)	Lambros Vangelis	5						5			
9	MF	(Cyprus)	K. Charalambidis	4						4			
1	GK	(Portugal)	Daniel Fernandes	4						4			
45	DF	(Greece)	Christos Melissis	3						3			
10	MF	(Spain)	Toni González	3						3			
20	FW	(Poland)	Marcin Mięciel	3						3			
14	FW	(Greece)	L. Christodoulopoulos	3						3			
5	DF	(Peru)	Miguel Rebosio	1						1			
6	MF	(Peru)	Carlos Zegarra	1						1			
15	DF	(Greece)	Stelios Malezas	1						1			
23	DF	(Greece)	Dionysis Chasiotis	1						1			
46	MF	(Greece)	Chousein Moumin	1						1			
			TOTAL	88	4	1	3	1	0	91	5	1	

Only competitive matches

Ordered by (red card) , (yellow card) (yellow-red card) and (yellow card)
(yellow card) = Number of bookings; (yellow card) (yellow-red card) = Number of sending offs after a second yellow card; (red card) = Number of sending offs by a direct red card.
0 shown as blank

Source: Match reports in competitive matches, superleaguegreece.net, worldfootball.net
