= 2007–08 PAOK FC season =

PAOK
2007–08 season
- Chairman: Thodoris Zagorakis
- Manager: Georgios Paraschos, Fernando Santos
- Stadium: Toumba Stadium
- Super League: 9th
- Greek Cup: Fourth round
- Top goalscorer: League: Glen Salmon (4); All: Glen Salmon (5)
Home colours	Away colours	Third colours

The 2007–08 season was PAOK Football Club's 82nd in existence and the club's 49th consecutive season in the top flight of Greek football. The team entered the Greek Football Cup in the fourth round.

== Players ==
=== Squad ===
Note: Flags indicate national team as defined under FIFA eligibility rules; some limited exceptions apply. Players may hold more than one non-FIFA nationality.

No.	Pos.	Nation	Player
1	GK	POR	Daniel Fernandes
31	GK	GRE	Kostas Paliouras
33	GK	GRE	Kyriakos Tohouroglou
40	GK	GRE	Dimitris Kyriakidis
71	GK	GRE	Panagiotis Glykos
2	DF	GRE	Nikos Arabatzis
4	DF	CYP	Elias Charalambous
13	DF	GRE	Stelios Malezas
21	DF	BRA	Baiano
24	DF	NGR	Ifeanyi Udeze
25	DF	BRA	Allan
27	DF	POL	Mirosław Sznaucner
30	DF	CRO	Goran Gavrančić
34	DF	GRE	Vangelis Georgiou
44	DF	NED	Ruud Knol
45	DF	GRE	Christos Melissis
95	DF	GRE	Panagiotis Kourdakis

No.	Pos.	Nation	Player
3	MF	GRE	Pantelis Konstantinidis
18	MF	GRE	Lambros Vangelis
19	MF	ESP	Toni González
21	MF	GRE	Stavros Tsoukalas
22	MF	ARG	Ricardo Verón
23	MF	GRE	Vasilios Lakis
25	MF	GRE	Sotiris Balafas
26	MF	GRE	Stelios Delibasis
43	MF	GRE	Georgios Georgiadis
46	MF	GRE	Chousein Moumin
88	MF	GRE	Stelios Iliadis
7	FW	POR	Sérgio Conceição
9	FW	ROU	Viorel Frunză
10	FW	GRE	Lazaros Christodoulopoulos
11	FW	GRE	Zisis Vryzas
14	FW	SRB	Ivica Iliev
16	FW	GRE	Dimitrios Orfanos
28	FW	GRE	Stefanos Athanasiadis
29	FW	RSA	Glen Salmon

== Transfers ==
Players transferred in

Date	Pos.	Name	Club	Fee
	MF	(Argentina) Ricardo Verón	(Italy) Siena	200K
	DF	(Croatia) Goran Gavrančić	(Ukraine) Dynamo Kyiv	150K (Loan)
	MF	(Brazil) Baiano	(Brazil) Anápolis Futebol Clube	100K
	FW	(Moldova) Viorel Frunză	(Romania) CFR Cluj	75K (Loan)
	MF	(Greece) Vasilios Lakis	(Greece) AEL Athens	Free
	DF	(Poland) Mirosław Sznaucner	(Greece) Iraklis	Free
	DF	(Netherlands) Ruud Knol	(Netherlands) Vitesse	Free
	GK	(Greece) Panagiotis Glykos	(Greece) Olympiacos Volos	Free
	DF	(Nigeria) Ifeanyi Udeze	(Nigeria) Bendel Insurance	Free
	FW	(Serbia) Ivica Iliev	(Italy) Messina	Free
	FW	(Greece) Dimitrios Orfanos	(Greece) Apollon Kalamarias	Free
	FW	(South Africa) Glen Salmon	(Netherlands) NAC Breda	Free
	MF	(Portugal) Sérgio Conceição	(Kuwait) Al-Qadisiyah FC	Free
	FW	(Greece) Zisis Vryzas	(Greece) Xanthi F.C.	Free
	DF	(Greece) Vangelis Georgiou	(Greece) PAOK U20	
	GK	(Greece) Kostas Paliouras	(Greece) PAOK U20	
	MF	(Greece) Giannis Pechlivanis	(Greece) PAOK U20	
	DF	(Greece) Panagiotis Kourdakis	(Greece) PAOK U20	

Players transferred out

Date	Pos.	Name	Club	Fee
28 May 2007	DF	(Greece) Theodoros Zagorakis		End of career^{1}
1 Jun 2007	DF	(Romania) Cosmin Bărcăuan	(Ukraine) Shakhtar	End of loan
	FW	(Poland) Marcin Mięciel	(Germany) Bochum	250K
	DF	(Greece) Giannis Voskopoulos	(Greece) Panserraikos F.C.	Free
	FW	(Hungary) Sándor Torghelle	(Germany) Carl Zeiss Jena	Free
	DF	(Greece) Dimitrios Papastergiou	(Greece) Thermaikos F.C.	Free
	MF	(Serbia) Nenad Stojaković	(Iran) Shirin Faraz F.C.	Free
	FW	(Cyprus) Yiasoumis Yiasoumi	(Cyprus) Aris Limassol FC	Free
	DF	(Brazil) Índio	(Brazil) SE Gama	Free
1 Jan 2008	MF	(Greece) Chousein Moumin	(Greece) Panserraikos F.C.	Loan
6 Jan 2008	MF	(Greece) Zisis Vryzas		End of career^{2}

^{1} On 18 June 2007 become president.
^{2} On 6 January 2008, Vryzas played his last game. On 8 January 2008, Vryzas was officially appointed as the Technical Director of PAOK FC. He joined the club's board along with former teammate and current chairman of the club, Theodoros Zagorakis.

== Competitions ==
=== Overview ===
Competition	Record							
Competition	Pld	W	D	L	GF	GA	GD	Win %
Super League Greece	30	10	5	15	29	35	−6	33.33
Greek Cup	1	0	0	1	2	4	−2	0.00
Total	31	10	5	16	31	39	−8	32.26

Last updated: 5 February 2017.
Source: Competitions

=== Managerial statistics ===
Head coach	From	To	Record							
Head coach	From	To	G	W	D	L	GF	GA	GD	Win %
(Greece) Georgios Paraschos	Start Season	02.09.2007	1	0	0	1	0	1	−1	0.00
(Portugal) Fernando Santos	03.09.2007	End season	30	10	5	15	31	38	−7	33.33

== Super League Greece ==
=== League table ===
Pos	Team	Pld	W	D	L	GF	GA	GD	Pts
7	Asteras Tripolis	30	11	11	8	28	24	+4	44
8	Skoda Xanthi	30	10	6	14	33	39	−6	36
9	PAOK	30	10	5	15	29	35	−6	35 (Note: Head-to-head record: PAOK–Iraklis 3–0, Iraklis–PAOK 1–0.)
10	Iraklis	30	8	11	11	28	33	−5	35
11	Levadiakos	30	10	3	17	31	51	−20	33

Source: Super League Greece
Rules for classification: 1st points; 2nd head-to-head points; 3rd head-to-head goal difference; 4th decision match.
According to the official Super League playoff regulation, the position after the playoffs replaces the regular season position.

=== Results summary ===
Overall								Home						Away					
Pld	W	D	L	GF	GA	GD	Pts	W	D	L	GF	GA	GD	W	D	L	GF	GA	GD
30	10	5	15	29	35	−6	35	9	2	4	22	12	+10	1	3	11	7	23	−16

Last updated: 5 February 2017.
Source: Competitive matches

=== Results by round ===
Round	1	2	3	4	5	6	7	8	9	10	11	12	13	14	15	16	17	18	19	20	21	22	23	24	25	26	27	28	29	30
Ground	A	H	A	H	A	H	A	H	H	A	H	A	H	A	H	H	A	H	A	H	A	H	A	A	H	A	H	A	H	A
Result	L	W	L	D	L	W	L	W	W	L	W	D	W	L	W	L	L	L	L	W	W	D	L	D	L	D	W	L	L	L
Position	12	7	9	10	11	10	10	8	8	9	7	8	6	7	6	6	6	8	8	8	7	8	9	9	9	9	9	9	9	9

Source: League matches
A = Away; H = Home; W = Win; D = Draw; L = Loss

=== Matches ===
Win Draw Loss

1 September 2007 1	Xanthi	1–0	PAOK	Xanthi
20:15 EET	Mauro Poy 63' Manager: (Belgium) Emilio Ferrera		Manager: (Greece) Georgios Paraschos	Stadium: Xanthi FC Arena; Attendance: 2,139; Referee: Konstantinos Papastamatis

22 September 2007 2	PAOK	3–0	Iraklis	Thessaloniki
21:30 EET	Christos Melissis 6'; Lambros Vangelis 47'; Vasilios Lakis 64' Manager: (Portugal) Fernando Santos		Manager: (Serbia) Ivan Jovanović	Stadium: Toumba Stadium; Attendance: 11,637; Referee: Michalis Koukoulakis

29 September 2007 3	Panathinaikos	2–0	PAOK	Athens
19:00 EET	Giorgos Karagounis 43' (pen.); Dimitris Salpingidis 83' Manager: (Portugal) José Peseiro	Report	Manager: (Portugal) Fernando Santos	Stadium: Leoforos Alexandras Stadium; Referee: Vasilis Terovitsas

6 October 2007 4	PAOK	2–2	OFI	Thessaloniki
18:00 EET	Lambros Vangelis 8'; Pantelis Konstantinidis 9' Manager: (Portugal) Fernando Santos		6' Leozinho; 36' Nikos Kounenakis Manager: (Germany) Reiner Maurer	Stadium: Toumba Stadium; Attendance: 7,395; Referee: Theodoros Gaitatzis

21 October 2007 5	Aris	3–1	PAOK	Thessaloniki
18:00 EET	Koke 16', 57'; Ronald García 73'		23' Sotiris Balafas	Stadium: Kleanthis Vikelidis Stadium; Attendance: 11,565; Referee: Anastasios Kakos

21 October 2007 6	PAOK	4–1	Apollon Kalamarias	Thessaloniki
19:00 EET	Christos Melissis 26'; Lazaros Christodoulopoulos 70'; Glen Salmon 82'; Pantelis Konstantinidis 90' Manager: (Portugal) Fernando Santos		66' Emanuel Perrone Manager: (Greece) Makis Katsavakis	Stadium: Toumba Stadium; Attendance: 4,430; Referee: Lazaros Polatian

3 November 2007 7	Olympiacos	2–1	PAOK	Piraeus
20:30 EET	Vasilis Torosidis 51'; Darko Kovačević 66' Manager: (Greece) Takis Lemonis		42' Pantelis Konstantinidis Manager: (Portugal) Fernando Santos	Stadium: Karaiskakis Stadium; Attendance: 28,077; Referee: Konstantinos Papastamatis

11 November 2007 8	PAOK	1–0	Ergotelis	Thessaloniki
15:45 EET	Glen Salmon 87' Manager: (Portugal) Fernando Santos		Manager: (Greece) Nikos Karageorgiou	Stadium: Toumba Stadium; Attendance: 6,364; Referee: Romanos Kontogiannidis

25 November 2007 9	PAOK	3–1	Panionios	Thessaloniki
15:45 EET	Georgios Georgiadis 7'; Pantelis Konstantinidis 14'; Stelios Malezas 24' Manager: (Portugal) Fernando Santos		28' Marcelo Pletsch Manager: (Germany) Ewald Lienen	Stadium: Toumba Stadium; Attendance: 11,506; Referee: Christoforos Zografos

2 December 2007 10	Asteras Tripolis	2–0	PAOK	Tripoli
18:00 EET	Lucio Filomeno 14'; Danijel Cesarec 65' Manager: (Brazil) Paulo Campos		Manager: (Portugal) Fernando Santos	Stadium: Theodoros Kolokotronis Stadium; Attendance: 3,685; Referee: Michalis Germanakos

8 December 2007 11	PAOK	2–0	Veria	Thessaloniki
15:45 EET	Toni González 3'; Glen Salmon 52' Manager: (Portugal) Fernando Santos		Manager: (Serbia) Ratko Dostanić	Stadium: Toumba Stadium; Attendance: 3,261; Referee: Giannis Stavridis

15 December 2007 12	Atromitos	0–0	PAOK	Peristeri, Athens
15:45 EET	Manager: (Argentina) Guillermo Hoyos		Manager: (Portugal) Fernando Santos	Stadium: Peristeri Stadium; Attendance: 2,770; Referee: Michael Koukoulakis

22 December 2007 13	PAOK	1–0	Levadiakos	Thessaloniki
15:45 EET	Vasilios Lakis 88' Manager: (Portugal) Fernando Santos		Manager: (Bulgaria) Georgi Vasilev	Stadium: Toumba Stadium; Attendance: 7,297; Referee: Georgios Kaznaferis

30 December 2007 14	AEK Athens	2–0	PAOK	Athens
18:00 EET	Ismael Blanco 33'; Júlio César 90' Manager: (Spain) Lorenzo Serra Ferrer		Manager: (Portugal) Fernando Santos	Stadium: Olympic Stadium; Attendance: 24,257; Referee: Konstantinos Papastamatis

6 January 2008 15	PAOK	1–0	AEL	Thessaloniki
18:00 EET	Lazaros Christodoulopoulos 15' Manager: (Portugal) Fernando Santos		Manager: (Greece) Georgios Donis	Stadium: Toumba Stadium; Attendance: 9,726; Referee: Michael Koukoulakis

13 January 2008 16	PAOK	0–1	Skoda Xanthi	Thessaloniki
15:45 EET	Manager: (Portugal) Fernando Santos		35' Tomasz Radzinski Manager: (Greece) Nikos Kehagias	Stadium: Toumba Stadium; Attendance: 10,204; Referee: Anastasios Kakos

20 January 2008 17	Iraklis	1–0	PAOK	Thessaloniki
18:00 EET	Dimitris Giantsis 13' Manager: (Spain) Ángel Pedraza		Manager: (Portugal) Fernando Santos	Stadium: Kaftanzoglio Stadium; Attendance: 8,381; Referee: Michalis Germanakos

27 January 2008 18	PAOK	0–1	Panathinaikos	Thessaloniki
18:00 EET	Manager: (Portugal) Fernando Santos		34' Dimitris Salpingidis Manager: (Portugal) José Peseiro	Stadium: Toumba Stadium; Attendance: 19,000; Referee: Vasilios Pamporidis

3 February 2008 19	OFI	2–0	PAOK	Heraklion
15:45 EET	Nikos Kounenakis 20'; Joseph Obinna 90' Manager: (Greece) Georgios Paraschos		Manager: (Portugal) Fernando Santos	Stadium: Theodoros Vardinogiannis Stadium; Attendance: 2,540; Referee: Konstantinos Papastamatis

10 February 2008 20	PAOK	3–0	Aris	Thessaloniki
15:45 EET	Sotiris Balafas 32'; Lazaros Christodoulopoulos 37'; Glen Salmon 45'			Stadium: Toumba Stadium; Attendance: 22,000; Referee: Giannis Stavridis

17 February 2008 21	Apollon Kalamarias	0–2	PAOK	Thessaloniki
15:45 EET	Manager: (Greece) Makis Katsavakis		29' Vasilios Lakis; 85' Ivica Iliev Manager: (Portugal) Fernando Santos	Stadium: Kaftanzoglio Stadium; Attendance: 5,439; Referee: Dimitris Kalopoulos

23 February 2008 22	PAOK	1–1	Olympiacos	Thessaloniki
18:00 EET	Toni González 2' Manager: (Portugal) Fernando Santos		22' Darko Kovačević Manager: (Greece) Takis Lemonis	Stadium: Toumba Stadium; Attendance: 22,000; Referee: Vasilis Pamporidis

1 March 2008 23	Ergotelis	2–0	PAOK	Heraklion
15:45 EET	Júnior 60'; Dimitrios Grammozis 81' Manager: (Greece) Nikos Karageorgiou		Manager: (Portugal) Fernando Santos	Stadium: Pankritio Stadium; Attendance: 6,750; Referee: Stavros Tritsonis

8 March 2008 24	Panionios	0–0	PAOK	Nea Smyrni
18:00 EET	Manager: (Germany) Ewald Lienen		Manager: (Portugal) Fernando Santos	Stadium: Nea Smyrni Stadium; Attendance: 2,632; Referee: Georgios Daloukas

15 March 2008 25	PAOK	0–1	Asteras Tripolis	Thessaloniki
15:45 EET	Manager: (Portugal) Fernando Santos		90' Mauro Milano Manager: (Greece) Panagiotis Tzanavaras	Stadium: Toumba Stadium; Attendance: 12,796; Referee: Nathanail Charalampidis

22 March 2008 26	Veria	0–0	PAOK	Veria
18:00 EET	Manager: (Greece) Panagiotis Tsalouchidis		Manager: (Portugal) Fernando Santos	Stadium: Veria Stadium; Attendance: 3,481; Referee: Georgios Stathopoulos

30 March 2008 27	PAOK	1–0	Atromitos	Thessaloniki
17:00 EET	Georgios Georgiadis 43' Manager: (Portugal) Fernando Santos		Manager: (Argentina) Guillermo Hoyos	Stadium: Toumba Stadium; Attendance: 7,721; Referee: Panikos Kailis

6 April 2008 28	Levadiakos	2–0	PAOK	Livadeia
17:00 EET	Leonardo 12'; Paraskevas Andralas 70' Manager: (Greece) Babis Tennes		Manager: (Portugal) Fernando Santos	Stadium: Levadia Municipal StadiumLivadeia; Referee: Petros Konstantineas

13 April 2008 29	PAOK	0–4	AEK Athens	Thessaloniki
17:00 EET	Manager: (Portugal) Fernando Santos		20' Sokratis Papastathopoulos; 23' Ismael Blanco; 25' Nikos Liberopoulos; 82' Mohamed Kallon Manager: (Greece) Nikos Kostenoglou	Stadium: Toumba Stadium; Attendance: 11,569; Referee: Dimitrios Kyrkos

20 April 2008 30	AEL	4–3	PAOK	Larissa
17:00 EET	Ilias Kotsios 45'; Tümer Metin 59'; Maciej Żurawski 65', 72' (pen.) Manager: (Greece) Nikos Kostenoglou		8', 41' Stefanos Athanasiadis; 30' Sotiris Balafas Manager: (Portugal) Fernando Santos	Stadium: AEL FC Arena; Attendance: 6,428; Referee: Ioannis Giannopoulos

== Greek Football Cup ==
=== Fourth round ===
10 October 2007	Thrasyvoulos	4–2	PAOK	Fyli, Attica
20:30	Efstathios Rokas 3'; Manolis Liapakis 16'; Georgios Poulakos 54'; Giannis Katsikis 90' Manager: (Greece) Sakis Tsiolis		67' Lazaros Christodoulopoulos; 88' Glen Salmon Manager: (Portugal) Fernando Santos	Stadium: Fyli Municipal Stadium; Attendance: 534; Referee: Michael Koukoulakis

== Statistics ==
=== Squad statistics ===
As of Full season 2007-2008

Appearances denote players in the starting lineup, with the numbers in parentheses denoting appearances as substitute.

No.	Name	Super League		Greek Cup		Total	
No.	Name	Apps	Goals	Apps	Goals	Apps	Goals
Goalkeepers
1	(Portugal) Daniel Fernandes	30	0	0	0	30	0
44	(Greece) Dimitris Kyriakidis	0	0	1	0	1	0
Defenders
3	(Greece) Pantelis Konstantinidis	24 (6)	4	1	0	25 (6)	4
4	(Cyprus) Elias Charalambous	20 (1)	0	0	0	20 (1)	0
5	(Greece) Christos Melissis	24	2	0	0	24	2
13	(Greece) Stelios Malezas	11 (2)	1	0	0	11 (2)	1
21	(Brazil) Agenaldo Baiano	20 (1)	0	0	0	20 (1)	0
27	(Poland) Mirosław Sznaucner	19	0	0	0	19	0
30	(Croatia) Goran Gavrančić	7	0	0	0	7	0
34	(Greece) Vangelis Georgiou	2	0	0	0	2	0
44	(Netherlands) Ruud Knol	23	0	1	0	24	0
Midfielders
6	(Greece) Sotiris Balafas	24 (2)	3	1	0	25 (2)	3
7	(Portugal) Sérgio Conceição	7 (3)	0	0	0	7 (3)	0
8	(Greece) Stelios Iliadis	16 (4)	0	1	0	17 (4)	0
18	(Greece) Lambros Vangelis	16 (3)	2	0	0	16 (3)	2
19	(Spain) Toni González	16 (7)	2	1	0	17 (7)	2
22	(Argentina) Ricardo Verón	11 (1)	0	0	0	11 (1)	0
23	(Greece) Vasilios Lakis	22 (7)	3	1	0	23 (7)	3
43	(Greece) Georgios Georgiadis	25 (8)	2	1	0	26 (8)	2
46	(Greece) Chousein Moumin	6 (2)	0	1 (1)	0	7 (3)	0
88	(Greece) Giannis Pechlivanis	1	0	0	0	1	0
Forwards
9	(Moldova) Viorel Frunză	4 (3)	0	0	0	4 (3)	0
10	(Greece) Christodoulopoulos	25 (7)	3	1 (1)	1	26 (8)	4
14	(Serbia) Ivica Iliev	18 (11)	1	1	0	19 (11)	1
16	(Greece) Dimitrios Orfanos	5 (4)	0	1	0	6 (4)	0
28	(Greece) Stefanos Athanasiadis	4 (3)	2	0	0	4 (3)	2
29	(South Africa) Glen Salmon	24 (2)	4	1	1	25 (2)	5
	(Greece) Zisis Vryzas	13 (10)	0	1 (1)	0	14 (11)	0

=== Goalscorers ===
Rank	No.	Pos.	Player	Super League	Cup	Total
1	9	FW	(South Africa) Glen Salmon	4	1	5
2	3	DF	(Greece) Konstantinidis	4	0	4
3	10	FW	(Greece) Christodoulopoulos	3	1	4
4	6	MF	(Greece) Sotiris Balafas	3	0	3
5	23	MF	(Greece) Vasilios Lakis	3	0	3
6	28	FW	(Greece) Athanasiadis	2	0	2
7	43	MF	(Greece) Georgios Georgiadis	2	0	2
8	19	MF	(Spain) Toni González	2	0	2
9	18	MF	(Greece) Lambros Vangelis	2	0	2
10	5	DF	(Greece) Christos Melissis	2	0	2
11	14	FW	(Serbia) Ivica Iliev	1	0	1
12	13	DF	(Greece) Stelios Malezas	1	0	1
Own goals				0	0	0
TOTALS				29	2	31

=== Disciplinary record ===
No.	Pos	Nat	Name	Super League			Greek Cup			Total			Notes
No.	Pos	Nat	Name	Booked	(yellow card) (yellow-red card)	Sent off (straight red)	Booked	(yellow card) (yellow-red card)	Sent off (straight red)	Booked	(yellow card) (yellow-red card)	Sent off (straight red)	Notes
6	MF	(Greece)	Sotiris Balafas	8	1					8	1		
29	FW	(South Africa)	Glen Salmon	7						7			
43	MF	(Greece)	Georgios Georgiadis	6						6			
10	FW	(Greece)	Christodoulopoulos	5			1			6			
44	DF	(Netherlands)	Ruud Knol	4	1					4	1		
22	MF	(Argentina)	Ricardo Verón	5						5			
3	DF	(Greece)	Konstantinidis	4						4			
27	DF	(Poland)	Mirosław Sznaucner	4						4			
1	GK	(Portugal)	Daniel Fernandes	3						3			
5	DF	(Greece)	Christos Melissis	3						3			
4	DF	(Cyprus)	Elias Charalambous	3						3			
19	MF	(Spain)	Toni González	3						3			
18	MF	(Greece)	Lambros Vangelis	3						3			
14	FW	(Serbia)	Ivica Iliev	3						3			
21	DF	(Brazil)	Baiano	3						3			
8	MF	(Greece)	Stelios Iliadis	2						2			
23	MF	(Greece)	Vasilios Lakis	2						2			
7	DF	(Portugal)	Sérgio Conceição	1						1			
13	DF	(Greece)	Stelios Malezas	1						1			
34	DF	(Greece)	Vangelis Georgiou	1						1			
16	FW	(Greece)	Dimitrios Orfanos	1						1			
	FW	(Greece)	Zisis Vryzas	1						1			
			TOTAL	73	2	0	1	0	0	74	2	0	

Only competitive matches

Ordered by (red card) , (yellow card) (yellow-red card) and (yellow card)
(yellow card) = Number of bookings; (yellow card) (yellow-red card) = Number of sending offs after a second yellow card; (red card) = Number of sending offs by a direct red card.
0 shown as blank

Source: Match reports in competitive matches, superleaguegreece.net
