= Kiriakidis =

Kiriakidis or Kyriakidis is a patronymic surname that means "the son/daughter of Kiriakos (Kyriakos)". It may refer to the following notable people:

- Dimitris Kyriakidis (born 1986), Greek footballer playing for Panserraikos F.C.
- Ilias Kyriakidis (born 1985), Greek footballer playing for Ergotelis F.C.
- Kosmas Kiriakidis, former president of the Greek football club AEK Athens F.C.
- Pavlos Kyriakidis (born 1991), Greek footballer playing for Atromitos F.C.
- Pétros Kiriakídis, Greek sprinter, who specializes in the 400 metres
- Stefanos Kiriakidis, Greek film, stage and television actor
- Yannis Kyriakides, Cypriot composer residing in the Netherlands
