= 1999 Bob Save Superbowl =

South African football tournament season

1999 Bob Save Super Bowl
Tournament details
- Country: South Africa

Final positions
- Champions: Supersport United
- Runners-up: Kaizer Chiefs

The 1999 Bob Save Superbowl was the 1999 season of the South African club football (soccer) knockout tournament, then known as the Bob Save Superbowl for sponsorship reasons.

Supersport United defeated Kaizer Chiefs 2–1 in the final, the first time Supersport had won the cup.

Chiefs entered the final hoping to win a treble, having won the Rothmans Cup earlier in the season. A few days after losing the final, they missed out on the 1998–99 Premiership title on goal difference.

== Results ==
=== Final ===
29 May 1999

Supersport United	2–1	Kaizer Chiefs
Madigage 38' Salmon 77'		Ndlanya 90'
