= Azmi Mohamed Megahed =

Egyptian volleyball player (1950–2020)

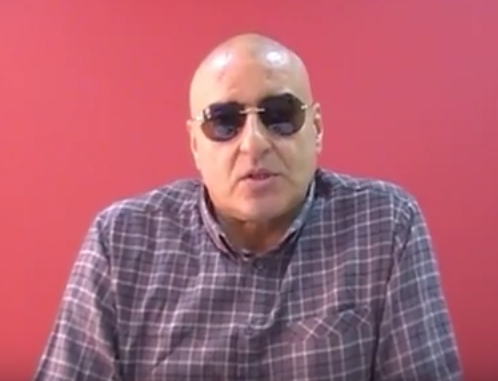
- Azmi Mohamed Megahed in 2014

Personal information
- Nationality: Egyptian
- Born: 15 April 1950; Dakahlia, Egypt
- Died: 12 September 2020 (aged 70); Cairo, Egypt
- Height: 1.89 m (6 ft 2 in)

Sport
- Sport: Volleyball

Azmi Mohamed Megahed (Arabic: عزمي محمد مجاهد; 15 April 1950 – 12 September 2020) was an Egyptian volleyball player. He competed in the men's tournament at the 1976 Summer Olympics.

== Biography ==
Born in Dakahlia, Megahed played for Zamalek SC and Egypt national team for 16 years. He won the best African player award in 1974. He also won many individual, domestic and continental awards as a player and manager. He later became a board member of Zamalek SC, then worked as a political commentator and TV presenter at "Al Assema TV". His son, Amir Azmy, became a footballer.

He died on 12 September 2020 in a hospital in Cairo due to COVID-19 during the pandemic in Egypt.
