= Lazaros Christodoulopoulos =

Greek former football player (born 1986)

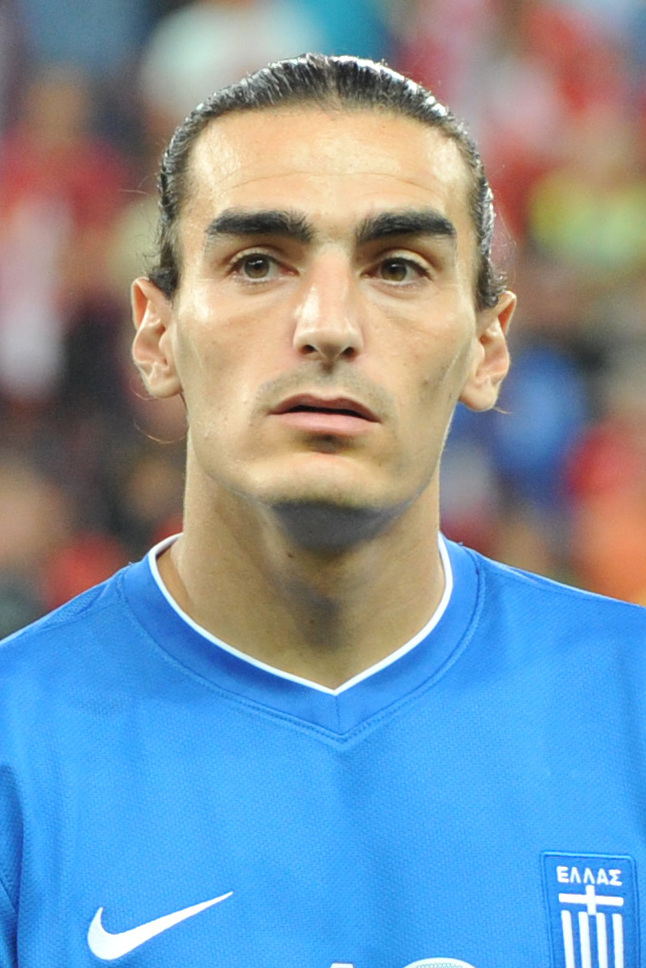
- Christodoulopoulos with Greece in 2013

Personal information
- Full name: Lazaros Christodoulopoulos
- Date of birth: 19 December 1986 (age 39)
- Place of birth: Diavata, Greece
- Height: 1.83 m (6 ft 0 in)
- Positions: Winger; attacking midfielder

Youth career
- 2000–2004: PAOK

Senior career*
Years	Team	Apps	(Gls)
2004–2008	PAOK	57	(8)
2008–2013	Panathinaikos	89	(15)
2013–2014	Bologna	39	(3)
2014–2016	Hellas Verona	22	(1)
2015–2016	→ Sampdoria (loan)	10	(1)
2016–2018	AEK Athens	57	(12)
2018–2020	Olympiacos	23	(4)
2020–2021	Atromitos	26	(4)
2021–2023	Anorthosis	38	(10)
2023–2024	Aris	19	(1)
2024–2025	Iraklis	16	(1)
Total		396	(60)

International career^{‡}
2005–2006	Greece U19	7	(2)
2006–2008	Greece U21	15	(7)
2008–2018	Greece	35	(1)
- * Club domestic league appearances and goals as of July 25, 2025 ‡ National team caps and goals as of January 22, 2019

Lazaros Christodoulopoulos (Greek: Λάζαρος Χριστοδουλόπουλος, born 19 December 1986), known mononymously as Lazaros due to his long surname, is a Greek former professional footballer who played as a winger.

== Club career ==
=== PAOK ===
Christodoulopoulos started his career when he was picked up by Omonoia Sindos (in Thessaloniki) at a young age, and then Neapoli. His impressive performances caught the eye of a PAOK scout, and joined PAOK in the summer of 2004. He has been a mainstay in the PAOK first team proving to be a vital team player.

As of 2008 many European clubs were interested in signing him. He was contracted to PAOK until 2008 with minimum fee release clause of €6 million.

In the summer of 2006 he was given a trial by English giants Liverpool but PAOK was reluctant to sell him at the time. This started a dispute that prevented him from playing for more than half of the 2006–07 season. He was nicknamed "The Builder" by the local media, because during his fall-out in relations with PAOK, he stated that he would be better off being a construction worker than playing for PAOK again.

=== Panathinaikos ===
On 20 June 2008, Christodoulopoulos agreed to a deal in principle to join Panathinaikos for €3.8 million. Christodoulopoulos signed a four-year contract with the club. On 18 February 2010, Christodoulopoulos scored against Roma after coming on in the UEFA Europa League round of 32.

The 2011–12 season didn't start well for him, as he faced a serious knee injury during pre-season which led him to surgery. The club doctors said that he would be expected to return after five months. After months of therapy and special treatment, he joined the rest of the team at training in December. On 29 December 2011, the club president announced that Christodoulopoulos had agreed to sign a new three-year contract until 2015 since his contract was going to expire during the end of the 2011–12 season. In January 2012, it was reported that Liverpool were interested in signing Christodoulopoulos, the former trialist at the club, for £2,000,000 (€4,500,000).

Christodoulopoulos began 2012–13 by scoring in European and championship matches. He was given the number "10". He and Ibrahim Sissoko were the most important players for the season. In December, in order for Panathinaikos' president, Giannis Alafouzos, to save money for the team, he released players with high-paying contacts; as a result Christodoulopoulos was released alongside Nikos Spyropoulos, Loukas Vyntra, Antonis Petropoulos and Sebastian Leto.

=== Bologna ===
On 31 January 2013, Lazaros was transferred to Bologna on a free transfer. On 26 February 2013, Lazaros made his debut against Fiorentina coming on as a substitute and scoring a goal in a 2–1 win.

The departure of Alessandro Diamanti in January has opened its doors as a starter for Christodoulopoulos. The Greek attacking midfielder has proved ready and able to take advantage of the chances he had, becoming one of the linchpins of the team coached by Davide Ballardini.

In March 2014, Christodoulopoulos netted a late consolation penalty in a 2–1 away loss against Livorno. It was his first goal in the season. A week later, he gave Bologna's survival hopes a massive boost with a crucial 1–0 win over Cagliari at the Dal’Ara. He was outstanding for the club and at the heart of the club's excellent attacking football so it was no surprise when he swept home the winner from the penalty spot. Lazaros curled a free kick over the top for Bologna before being denied by another brilliant save with 15 minutes to go after again jinking past defenders and letting loose. Two minutes afterwards, the man of the match involved in everything was at the centre of controversy when the referee adjudged Daniele Dessena to have pushed him to the ground inside the box. The spot kick was awarded and Lazaros stepped up to provide the cool conversion and give his side a priceless win.

On 16 May 2014, there was tension in the training campus at Bologna, a few days after the last challenge at the Olimpico against Lazio ending a disappointing season that led to relegation to Serie B. An entry of Cesare Natali's hard training on Lazaros Christodoulopoulos, sparked the reaction of the Greek midfielder. Lazaros is afraid to get hurt and jeopardize his participation at the 2014 World Cup.

Bologna, after relegation, proceeded with the disposal of some popular players. As reported by TuttoSport, one of the starters will be the Greek midfielder Christodoulopoulos. The player had become wanted in Italy especially for Torino, Palermo and Fiorentina. The key element in his game is that the Greek midfielder knows how to take responsibility when the team is in trouble.

=== Hellas Verona ===
Hellas Verona have officially signed a three-year contract with Christodoulopoulos from Bologna for €1.3 million. The deal had been in the works over the last few days and hit problems when Verona's player Domenico Maietta refused a move the other way. On 30 June 2014, Verona released a statement confirming Christodoulopoulos had been bought outright without the need for an exchange. In January 2015, the interest of Hellas Verona in signing Argentinian offensive midfielder and winger Juan Sánchez Miño from Torino, leads the Gialloblù to offer him to i Granata the loan of Greek international same role player Lazaros Christodoulopoulos in exchange, according to Sky Sport Italia.

==== Loan to Sampdoria ====
On 31 August 2015, Christodoulopoulos joined Sampdoria in a swap deal involving Paweł Wszołek with the latter leaving Sampdoria on loan for Hellas Verona. The Greek midfielder has joined the club on an initial loan with an option to make the switch permanent. On 5 March 2016, he scored the third goal with the club in a 3–0 away win against Verona, when Lorenzo De Silvestri had his cross slammed into the back of the net from Christodoulopoulos on the volley, his first for the club coming against his former side.

=== AEK Athens ===
==== 2016–17 season ====
On 27 August 2016, Christodoulopoulos signed a 3-season (2+1) contract for AEK Athens, as a free transfer, in order to return to his motherland after 3.5 years in Italy. On 25 October 2016, he scored his first goal with the club, in a 4–0 Cup home win game against Kerkyra. On 5 February 2017, he scored a brace in a 6–0 home Super League win against Veria and was named "Man of the Match". On 2 April he scored in his club 2–3 home loss Super League game against his former club, Panathinaikos. On 6 May 2017, in the 2016–17 Greek Cup final Lazaros had equalized after Diego Biseswar's opener for the home side PAOK, in a 2–1 loss.

==== 2017–18 season ====
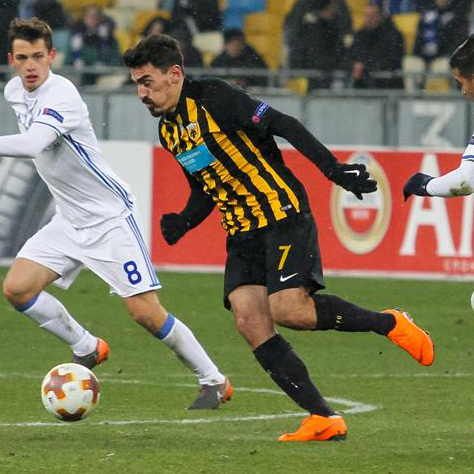
Christodoulopoulos with AEK Athens in 2017

Christodoulopoulos solidified his position as the team's main right winger during the 2017–18 preseason. On 14 September 2017, he sealed the score in the second half with a direct free kick as AEK won 2–1 after an impressive performance against Rijeka at his first matchday of 2017–18 UEFA Europa League group stage. On 18 September 2017, AEK won 1–0 against newly promoted Super League club Lamia, at Peristeri Stadium, thanks to Christodoulopoulos, coming from the bench, scoring the goal of the match at 81st minute, that brought the team on the top of the table, with 10 points after 4 games. It was his first Super League goal for the 2017–18 season. On 24 September 2017, he scored 2 goals, including an absolutely sensational free kick, helping his club come from behind and defeat Olympiacos with the score 3–2 against AEK. Petros Mantalos' goal on the 89th minute completed the comeback and the final whistle put AEK on the top of the table. It was named MVP of the game. On 23 November 2017, he heads leveller in a home 2–2 Europa League group stage home game against Rijeka, as Andrej Prskalo comes off his line to punch away Anastasios Bakasetas' free-kick, but his clearance falls kindly for Christodoulopoulos, who scored into the unguarded net.

On 27 January 2018, Christodoulopoulos opened the scoring for Manolo Jiménez's team after 40 minutes at the Olympic Stadium in a 2–0 home win against Lamia. On 7 February 2018, he opened the score in a 2–1 home Greek Cup win game against rivals Olympiacos, helping AEK to qualify to the semi-finals. On 11 February 2018, Christodoulopoulos scored the only goal with a penalty kick four minutes after he entered in the field, beating Asteras Tripolis 1–0 at the Olympic Stadium to move one point clear of PAOK at the summit. On 1 April 2018, in the derby against Panathinaikos, Christodoulopoulos reached 200 appearances with all his clubs in the Super League. On 15 April 2018, he scored a crucial goal sealing a 1–0 away win against Platanias, that helped Super League leaders AEK inched closer to the league title for the first time since 1994. Three days later, he scored a wonderful bicycle kick in the 94th minute of the Cup semi-final against AEL. It was the winning goal that helped AEK advance to the final against PAOK, with an aggregate score of 2–2. He finished his best season in his career having 47 appearances (16 goals, 4 assists) in all competitions.

On 14 May 2018, AEK decided to put Christodoulopoulos in the out-of-favour list due to the player perceiving the club's contract renewal talks as 'threats' and being in discussions with rivals Olympiacos over a potential career move. The club decided to settle the player's contract breach issues in the court of law, while Lazaros and the Reds retaliated by filing a lawsuit on grounds of the player's contract expiring in the summer of 2018, despite AEK claiming that the player had signed a mandatory one-year extension clause as part of the deal.

=== Olympiacos ===
Following his legal conflict with AEK, Olympiacos announced the acquisition of Christodoulopoulos on 15 May 2018, on a 2-year deal effective from the beginning of July. Lazaros thus became the first and only player in Greek football history to wear the shirt of all 'Big-4' teams of the country - the other two being Panathinaikos and PAOK.

In August 2018, at UEFA Europa League third qualifying round against FC Luzern, he was the man of the series as he scored both a brace in the first game after successive corners from young full-back Kostas Tsimikas in a 4–0 home win, as well as in the second in a 3–1 away win, for Olympiacos to rack up an impressive 7–1 aggregate victory over the Swiss. Christodoulopoulos opened the score by heading in brilliantly from a precise Omar Elabdellaoui cross, and in the second was in the right place to ram the ball home following Roderick Miranda’s header after Jagoš Vuković had hit the crossbar with a shot. On 26 August 2018, Christodoulopoulos scored with a superb free-kick sealing a 1–0 home win game against Levadiakos in the opening matchday of the 2018–19 season.

On 3 September 2018, Christodoulopoulos became a 2018 FIFA Puskas Award nominee for his stunning marker scored for previous club AEK Athens against his then club Olympiacos. The FIFA Puskas Award is given out to the player who scored the best goal of the season and the international winger struck a beautiful free-kick from distance into the top right corner, giving opposing goalkeeper Stefanos Kapino no chance whatsoever. On 8 November 2018, Christodoulopoulos scored with a right footed shot from the centre of the box to the bottom left corner, after an assist by Kostas Fortounis with a cross in a hammering 5–1 win game against F91 Dudelange in the Europa League group stage. On 23 November 2018, Christodoulopoulos received a knock in a training session and did not play again until the turn of the year. On 19 January 2019, he returned to the squad scoring the winning goal in a 2–1 away win against PAS Giannina after a remarkable Daniel Podence assist. On 2 February 2019, he scored a penalty kick in a hammering 4–0 home win game against Panionios. On 17 February 2019, after receiving an injury against rivals AEK Athens, Christodoulopoulos ruptured the anterior cruciate ligament in his left knee, meaning he sat on the sidelines for at least six months.

On 22 December 2019, after a very difficult year for the defender marred by injury (309 days to be exact), Christodoulopoulos returned to action in an away game against Volos. On 8 January 2020, Christodoulopoulos' goal in the 2–0 win over Kalamata in the Greek Cup helped him to become the only footballer to wear the jersey of the four biggest Greek teams (Olympiacos, AEK, Panathinaikos and PAOK) and score in all Greek and UEFA competitions, with all four teams. On 5 June 2020, two days before the restart of the Super League playoffs, after an 80-days COVID-19 break Lazaros Christodoulopoulos received yet another injury blow, with the Olympiacos winger suffering a ligament rupture in his right knee. The recovery process was expected to last six weeks.

=== Atromitos ===
On 28 September 2020, Atromitos completed a great transfer move, as it announced the acquisition of the 33-year-old midfielder, who had signed a year contract for an undisclosed fee. On 4 October 2020, he played his first match of the 2020–21 season against his former team AEK Athens replacing Konstantinos Kotsopoulos at 82 minutes. On 7 November 2020, he scored the winning goal giving his club a vital 1–0 away win against Panathinaikos.

=== Anorthosis Famagusta ===
From 25 June 2021, Christodoulopoulos began playing for Anorthosis Famagusta with a one-year for an undisclosed fee. On 26 August 2021, Christodoulopoulos helped Anorthosis Famagusta with two goals in seven minutes against Hapoel Beer Sheva, to qualify for the Europa Conference League group stage. With a 62nd-minute penalty and a 69-minute tap-in from a Hovhannes Hambardzumyan assist, the 35-year-old winger was man-of-the-match. At the same time, the Greek player became only the second to score in the Champions League, Europa League and UEFA Conference League, after Petros Mantalos. On 25 November 2021, Anorthosis achieved the historic first victory of a Cypriot team in the Conference League group stage, where thanks to an astonishing 27th-minute goal by Christodoulopoulos they prevailed 1–0 over undefeated Gent. On 9 December, he scored a penalty in an away Conference League match against FK Partizan that ended 1-1.

=== Aris ===
In February 2023 he moved to Aris until the end of the season, this becoming the only player to play for all of the big 5 Greek clubs.

=== Iraklis ===
On the 18th of August 2024 Christodoulopoulos accepted the offer to join Iraklis F.C.

Christodoulopoulos is the first player in Greek football to have played for the four biggest football clubs in Attica and the three biggest football clubs in Thessaloniki at a professional level.

== International career ==
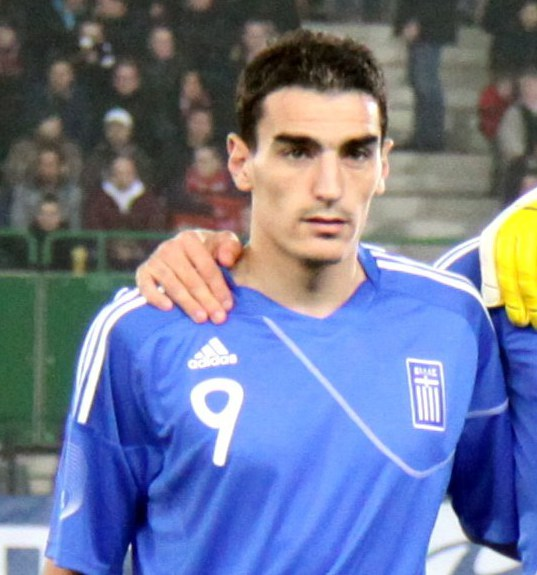
Christodoulopoulos with Greece in 2010

After impressing Greece coach Otto Rehhagel, he made his debut with Greece on 1 February 2008 and made his international debut in the win over the Czech Republic on 5 February. Fernando Santos' team went ahead in the 20th minute through Christodoulopoulos' strike who headed the only goal as Greece secured a well-deserved 1–0 victory over Lithuania in the 2014 World Cup qualifier which kept them in touching distance of Group G leaders Bosnia-Herzegovina.

== Career statistics ==
=== Club ===
As of match played 25 July 2025

Club	Season	League			National cup (Note: Includes Greek Cup, Coppa Italia, Cypriot Cup)		Europe		Other		Total	
Club	Season	Division	Apps	Goals	Apps	Goals	Apps	Goals	Apps	Goals	Apps	Goals
PAOK	2004–05	Super League Greece	1	0	1	0	–		–		2	0
PAOK	2005–06	Super League Greece	24	3	1	0	4 (Note: Appearances in UEFA Cup)	1	–		29	4
PAOK	2006–07	Super League Greece	7	2	0	0	–		–		7	2
PAOK	2007–08	Super League Greece	25	3	1	1	–		–		26	4
PAOK	Total		57	8	3	1	4	1	–		64	10
Panathinaikos	2008–09	Super League Greece	19	3	4	4	5 (Note: Appearances in UEFA Champions League)	0	–		28	7
Panathinaikos	2009–10	Super League Greece	16	1	5	0	9 (Note: Appearances in UEFA Europa League)	1	–		30	2
Panathinaikos	2010–11	Super League Greece	26	5	4	2	4	0	–		34	7
Panathinaikos	2011–12	Super League Greece	17	3	0	0	–		–		17	3
Panathinaikos	2012–13	Super League Greece	11	3	1	1	9 (Note: Four appearances and two goals in UEFA Champions League, five appearances in UEFA Europa League)	2	–		21	6
Panathinaikos	Total		89	15	14	7	27	3	–		130	25
Bologna	2012–13	Serie A	12	1	0	0	–		–		12	1
Bologna	2013–14	Serie A	27	2	2	0	–		–		29	2
Bologna	Total		39	3	2	0	–		–		41	3
Verona	2014–15	Serie A	22	1	2	1	–		–		24	2
Sampdoria	2015–16	Serie A	10	1	1	0	–		–		11	1
AEK	2016–17	Super League Greece	30	5	6	3	–		6	1	42	9
AEK	2017–18	Super League Greece	27	7	8	6	12	3	0	0	47	16
AEK	Total		57	12	14	9	12	3	6	1	89	25
Olympiacos	2018–19	Super League Greece	17	4	1	0	8	5	–		26	9
Olympiacos	2019–20	Super League Greece	6	0	2	1	0	0	–		8	1
Olympiacos	Total		23	4	3	1	8	5	–		34	10
Atromitos	2020–21	Super League Greece	26	4	0	0	–		–		26	4
Anorthosis	2021–22	Cypriot First Division	30	10	4	1	10	4	—		44	15
Anorthosis	2022–23	Cypriot First Division	8	0	1	0	—		—		9	0
Anorthosis	Total		38	10	5	1	10	4	–		53	15
Aris	2022–23	Super League Greece	13	0	—		—		—		13	0
Aris	2023–24	Super League Greece	6	1	1	0	2 (Note: Appearances in UEFA Europa Conference League)	0	—		9	1
Aris	Total		19	1	1	0	2	0	—		22	1
Iraklis	2024–25	Super League Greece 2	16	1	2	1	–		–		13	2
Career total			396	60	48	21	63	16	6	1	548	98

=== International ===
Scores and results list Greece's goal tally first

No	Date	Venue	Opponent	Score	Result	Competition
1.	7 June 2013	LFF Stadium, Vilnius, Lithuania	Lithuania	0–1	0–1	2014 FIFA World Cup qualification

== Honours ==
Panathinaikos

- Super League Greece: 2009–10
- Greek Cup: 2009–10

AEK Athens

- Super League Greece: 2017–18

Olympiacos

- Super League Greece: 2019–20
- Greek Cup: 2019–20

Individual

- Greek Cup top scorer: 2017–18 (together with Aleksandar Prijović, Pedro Conde)
- Super League Greece Greek Footballer of the Season: 2017–18
- Super League Team of the Season: 2017–18
