= Carlos Zegarra (footballer) =

Peruvian footballer (born 1977)

Personal information
- Full name: Carlos Alberto Zegarra Zamora
- Date of birth: 2 March 1977 (age 49)
- Place of birth: Lima, Peru
- Height: 1.83 m (6 ft 0 in)
- Position: Midfielder

Youth career
- Academia Cantolao
- Sporting Cristal

Senior career*
Years	Team	Apps	(Gls)
1997–1999	Sporting Cristal	47	(0)
2000–2002	Alianza Atlético	78	(26)
2002–2006	Sporting Cristal	143	(32)
2006	PAOK	5	(1)
2007	Alianza Lima	20	(2)
2008–2009	Juan Aurich	62	(12)
2010–2012	León de Huánuco	87	(21)
2013	Sport Huancayo	3	(0)
2013	Melgar	11	(1)
2014	San Simón	20	(2)
2015	Willy Serrato	9	(0)
Total		485	(97)

International career
2003–2012	Peru	24	(1)

Managerial career
- 2017: Sporting Cristal (assistant)
- * Club domestic league appearances and goals

Carlos Alberto Zegarra Zamora (born 2 March 1977) is a Peruvian former professional footballer who played as a midfielder. He gained 24 caps for Peru; his older brother Pablo also played for the national team.

== Club career ==
Zegarra was born in Lima. He started his youth career in the Academia Cantolao

He played in several Peruvian clubs including Alianza Lima and Sporting Cristal.

== International career ==
Zegarra made 24 appearances for the Peru national team.

He returned to the Peru national team after a six-year absence on 23 May 2012 in a friendly match at home against Nigeria, at the age of 35. Sergio Markarián substituted him in the match for Antonio Gonzales in the 72nd minute to secure the 1–0 win for Peru.
