= Ruud Knol =

Dutch football player and coach (born 1981)

Personal information
- Date of birth: 13 March 1981 (age 45)
- Place of birth: Zevenaar, Netherlands
- Height: 1.86 m (6 ft 1 in)
- Position: Centre-back

Youth career
- –1994: OBW
- 1994–2000: Vitesse

Senior career*
Years	Team	Apps	(Gls)
2000–2007	Vitesse	105	(9)
2007–2008	PAOK	23	(0)
2008–2011	Sparta Rotterdam	55	(8)
Total		183	(17)

Managerial career
- 2012–2013: Vitesse U17 (assistant)
- 2013–2014: Vitesse U14
- 2014–2016: Vitesse U15
- 2016–2017: Vitesse U16
- 2017–2019: Jong Vitesse (assistant)
- * Club domestic league appearances and goals

Ruud Knol (born 13 March 1981) is a Dutch professional football coach and former player. He most notably played as a centre-back for Vitesse between 2000 and 2007.

== Club career ==
Knol was born in Zevenaar, in the province of Gelderland and started his career at OBW, where he was spotted by Vitesse scouts. He made his professional debut for Vitesse on 8 September 2000, replacing Theo Janssen in the 80th minute of a 2–2 draw against Willem II. He played six years for Vitesse and was called up once by then Netherlands coach Louis van Gaal for the Netherlands national team. A serious injury threatened his career between 2002 and 2005 but he came back to play for Vitesse.

In December 2006, it was announced that Knol would be leaving Vitesse. His contract was set to expire, and was not renewed due to significant differences between the two parties. Furthermore, Knol expressed his desire for a fresh challenge. Some media speculated that his motivation was financial gain, which he denied. Despite receiving interest from various clubs, including 1. FC Köln and Southampton, Knol remained without a team for an extended period. Then, on 18 August, it was revealed that Knol had signed a two-year contract with Greek club PAOK. After one season in Greece, he returned to the Netherlands to play for Sparta Rotterdam.

Starting from the preseason of the 2011–12 season, Knol maintained his fitness at Vitesse while waiting for an attractive offer from abroad. Vitesse's coach, John van den Brom, had previously indicated that Knol was not in consideration for a contract with Vitesse. As a result, Knol made every effort to find a new club. However, after an unsuccessful trial at Coventry City and other attempts, he decided to retire from professional football.

== Coaching career ==
In July 2012, Knol returned to his former club, Vitesse, initially taking on the role of assistant coach for the under-17 team. However, in July 2013, he assumed the position of head coach for the under-14 team. On 16 January 2017, Vitesse announced that Theo Janssen would immediately become the coach of Vitesse O16. In response, Knol transitioned to the role of assistant coach for the reserve team, known as Jong Vitesse.

Jong Vitesse's stay in the Tweede Divisie was short-lived, lasting only one year. The team, under the leadership of John Lammers and Knol, finished seventeenth, which led to their relegation to the Derde Divisie. During the 2019–20 season, Knol worked as an analyst at De Graafschap.

== Career statistics ==
Appearances and goals by club, season and competition
Club	Season	League			KNVB Cup		Europe		Other		Total	
Club	Season	Division	Apps	Goals	Apps	Goals	Apps	Goals	Apps	Goals	Apps	Goals
Vitesse	2000–01	Eredivisie	14	0	0	0	1 (Note: Appearances in UEFA Cup)	0	—		15	0
Vitesse	2001–02	Eredivisie	24	3	3	0	—		—		27	3
Vitesse	2002–03	Eredivisie	2	0	0	0	—		—		2	0
Vitesse	2003–04	Eredivisie	12	2	0	0	—		4 (Note: Appearances in Eredivisie promotion/relegation playoffs)	1	16	3
Vitesse	2004–05	Eredivisie	3	0	1	0	—		—		4	0
Vitesse	2005–06	Eredivisie	27	1	0	0	—		6 (Note: Appearances in Eredivisie European play-offs)	0	33	1
Vitesse	2006–07	Eredivisie	23	3	0	0	—		6	1	29	4
Vitesse	Total		105	9	4	0	1	0	16	2	126	11
PAOK	2007–08	Super League	23	0	0	0	—		—		23	0
Sparta Rotterdam	2008–09	Eredivisie	26	5	2	0	—		—		28	5
Sparta Rotterdam	2009–10	Eredivisie	12	0	2	0	—		4	0	18	0
Sparta Rotterdam	2010–11	Eerste Divisie	17	3	1	0	—		—		18	3
Sparta Rotterdam	Total		55	8	5	0	—		4	0	64	8
Career total			183	17	9	0	1	0	20	2	213	19
