= Vasilios Antoniadis =

Greek football manager (born in 1960)

Personal information
- Full name: Vasilios Antoniadis
- Date of birth: 4 February 1960 (age 66)
- Place of birth: Kilkis, Greece

Managerial career
- Years: Team
- 1996: Iraklis
- 1997: Apollon Kalamarias
- 1997: Niki Volos
- 1998–2000: Pierikos
- 2000: Naoussa
- 2000: Trikala
- 2001: Panetolikos
- 2002: Kerkyra
- 2002–2003: Kalamata
- 2003: Kerkyra
- 2004: Agrotikos Asteras
- 2004–2005: Panserraikos
- 2005: Kastoria
- 2005–2006: Olympiacos Volos
- 2006: Panserraikos
- 2006–2007: Thrasyvoulos
- 2007: Kalamata
- 2008: Messiniakos
- 2011: Agrotikos Asteras

Vasilios Antoniadis (Greek: Βασίλειος Αντωνιάδης; born 4 February 1960) is a Greek football manager.
