= Dimitris Rizos =

Greek footballer

Personal information
- Full name: Dimitris Rizos
- Date of birth: 7 October 1976 (age 50)
- Place of birth: Lekani, Kavala, Greece
- Height: 1.90 m (6 ft 3 in)
- Position: Goalkeeper

Team information
- Current team: Keraunos Perni
- Number: 15

Senior career*
Years	Team	Apps	(Gls)
1999–2000	ILTEX Lykoi	9	(0)
2000–2003	Egaleo	41	(0)
2003	Leonidio	2	(0)
2004	Kilkisiakos	18	(0)
2004–2005	Agrotikos Asteras	15	(0)
2005–2006	Pierikos	19	(0)
2006–2008	Doxa Katokopias	34	(0)
2008–2009	PAOK	0	(0)
2009–2010	Olympiakos Nicosia	11	(0)
2010–2011	Anagennisi Karditsa	2	(0)
2012–2013	Panegialios	17	(0)
2013–2014	Kissamikos	10	(0)
2014–2015	Chania	11	(0)
- * Club domestic league appearances and goals

Dimitris Rizos (Greek: Δημήτρης Ρίζος; born 7 October 1976) is a Greek football goalkeeper. He currently playing for Keraunos Perni.

Rizos played for Egaleo F.C., appearing in five league matches during two seasons in the Super League Greece.
