= Amir Azmy =

Egyptian footballer (born 1983)

Personal information
- Full name: Amir Azmy Mohamed Megahed
- Date of birth: February 14, 1983 (age 43)
- Place of birth: Cairo, Egypt
- Height: 1.90 m (6 ft 3 in)
- Position: Centre back

Senior career*
| Years | Team | Apps | (Gls) |
| 2000–2004 | Zamalek | 12 | (0) |
| 2004–2006 | PAOK | 30 | (2) |
| 2006–2007 | Al-Shabab | 6 | (0) |
| 2007–2008 | Anorthosis Famagusta | 12 | (0) |
| 2008–2009 | Hacettepe | 10 | (0) |
| 2009–2009 | AEK Larnaca | 5 | (0) |
| 2009–2010 | Diyarbakırspor | 6 | (0) |
| 2010–2011 | Al-Taawoun | 10 | (0) |
| 2011–2011 | Astra II Ploiești | 1 | (0) |
| 2011–2013 | Misr El Makasa | 14 | (0) |
| 2013–2014 | Zugdidi | 6 | (0) |
| 2014–2015 | Al-Talaba | | |
| 2015–2016 | Enosis Neon Paralimni | 7 | (0) |
| 2016–2017 | AEL Kalloni | 8 | (0) |

International career
| 2005–2006 | Egypt | 5 | (1) |

Managerial career
- 2018–2019: Zamalek (assistant)
- 2021: Nogoom FC
- 2024–2024: Zamalek (assistant)
- * Club domestic league appearances and goals

Amir Azmy Megahed (Arabic: أمير عزمي مجاهد; born February 14, 1983) is an Egyptian football coach and retired player. He worked as assistant coach for Zamalek.

== Career ==
In December 2003, Azmy was suspended from football for 14 months following a positive doping test at the 2003 FIFA World Youth Championship. Azmy pledged not guilty for the dope found in his blood, and claimed that it was a component of a prescribed drug he took as part of his muscular enhancement training. He appealed for the suspension to be cancelled, but the appeal was not accepted.

After spending the suspension period, he signed for PAOK and was a regular starter before being transferred to Al-Shabab in KSA in what was eventually an unsuccessful experience for the player, where he featured very rarely as a starter.

As a result, Amir moved to the Cypriot League and joined Anorthosis Famagusta and was a key member of the team in their winning of the Cypriot title and qualifying as a result to the European Champions League.

After signing to Hacettepe Spor in June 2008, Azmy rapidly became a regular starter among the back four of the team. He featured as a starter in the first four games of the Turkish League, and made some decent displays, among which he was chosen as Man of the Match against Eskişehirspor.

In September 2008, Azmy started the match against Fenerbahçe, and was chosen to man-mark the Spanish international Daniel Güiza. He played a decent game, and well-managed to prevent the player's attacking chances, and helped his team to beat Fenerbahçe 1-0 for the first time in history.

On September 25, 2008, Amir Azmy was chosen among a list of seven players playing abroad to feature for Egypt in their last game of the World Cup 2010 Qualifiers first round against Djibouti on October 12.

== Personal life ==
His father, Azmi Mohamed Megahed, was a volleyball player.
