= Glen Salmon =

South African soccer player and manager (born 1977)

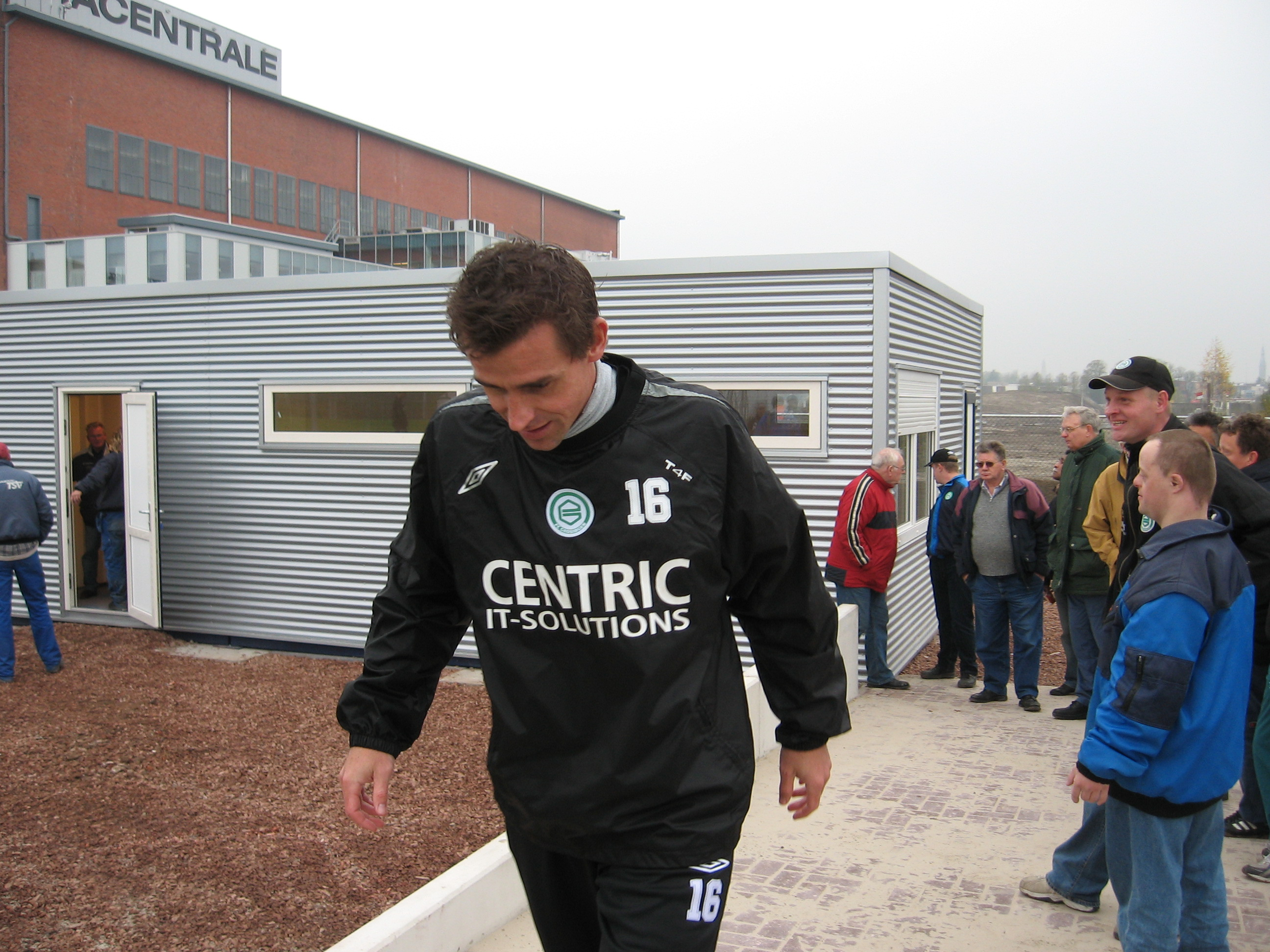
- Salmon training for FC Groningen

Personal information
- Full name: Glen George Salmon
- Date of birth: 24 December 1977 (age 48)
- Place of birth: Salisbury, Rhodesia (now Harare, Zimbabwe)
- Height: 1.80 m (5 ft 11 in)
- Position: Striker

Team information
- Current team: Orlando Pirates (reserves manager)

Youth career
- Chiltern Park
- Christian Brothers College
- Boksburg
- Alberton

Senior career*
Years	Team	Apps	(Gls)
1997–1999	Supersport United	31	(12)
1999–2002	NAC	82	(27)
2002–2007	Groningen	118	(25)
2007	→ NAC Breda (loan)	15	(8)
2007–2008	PAOK	24	(4)
2008–2012	Supersport United	62	(9)

International career
2000–2008	South Africa	3	(0)

Managerial career
- 2019–: Orlando Pirates (reserves manager)
- * Club domestic league appearances and goals

Glen George Salmon (born 24 December 1977) is a retired South African football forward and current manager of Orlando Pirates' B-team.

== Career ==
Salmon was born in the Rhodesian capital of Salisbury (now Harare, the capital of Zimbabwe) and grew up in South Africa.

Salmon's first professional team was Supersport United, where he scored one of the goals in the team's 2-1 win in the final of the 1999 Bob Save Superbowl.

He spent almost one decade playing in Europe for NAC Breda and FC Groningen in the Dutch Eredivisie and PAOK in Greece.

Salmon made his international debut against Algeria on 2 February 2000 and has been capped three times in total.

Scored on debut for Kempton Park in a 7–2 win over Luso Africa Stars .

== Coaching career ==
From the summer 2013 until the summer 2019, Salmon worked as an academy manager for Bidvest Wits. On 21 August 2019, he was appointed manager of Orlando Pirates' B-team.
