= Stelios Iliadis =

Greek footballer

Personal information
- Full name: Stylianos Iliadis
- Date of birth: 3 June 1986 (age 40)
- Place of birth: Thessaloniki, Greece
- Height: 1.80 m (5 ft 11 in)
- Position: Defensive midfielder

Senior career*
Years	Team	Apps	(Gls)
2002–2005	Apollon Kalamarias	59	(3)
2005–2009	PAOK	65	(3)
2009–2010	Iraklis	24	(2)
2011–2013	Kerkyra	33	(0)
2013–2014	Lokomotiv Plovdiv	18	(2)
2015–2017	Panthrakikos	35	(4)
2017	Veria	0	(0)
2018–2019	Agrotikos Asteras		
2022–2023	Asteras Karditsas		

International career
2004–2006	Greece U19	2	(0)
2006–2007	Greece U21	11	(0)
- * Club domestic league appearances and goals as of 17 January 2017

Stelios Iliadis (Greek: Στέλιος Ηλιάδης; born 3 June 1986) is a Greek former footballer who played as a midfielder.

== Club career ==
=== Apollon Kalamarias ===
He started his career in Apollon Kalamarias coming from the club's youth-system. Despite his relatively young age he played first-team football and appeared really mature which attracted the interest of bigger clubs.

=== PAOK ===
He was signed in the summer of 2005 by PAOK, for a fee of 250.000 euros and a percentage of his next sale. Shortly afterwards, he gained a starting spot in PAOK alongside club legend Theodoros Zagorakis. His best season to date is the 2006–2007 where he helped the team's cause scoring three goals also. In 2007–2008 season, and with new coach Fernando Santos preferring Sotiris Balafas and Lambros Vangelis at first and then Ricardo Matias Verón, he was restricted as a substitute but injury problems gave him the chance to play as a right defender where his performance regained his manager's faith in him.

The 2008–2009 season didn't start the best way for Iliadis. He played his first game coming as a late substitute against Levadiakos in the 7th matchday, wearing the PAOK captain's armband for the first time. He made his first start a few days later, in a game for the Greek Cup. He was released by PAOK after his contract expired.

=== Iraklis ===
On 5 August 2009, Iliadis signed a two-year contract with Iraklis, shortly after Nuno Piloto's (Iraklis' starting defensive midfielder) serious knee injury.

=== Kerkyra ===
On 2011 Iliadis signed with Kerkyra. Kerkyra on season 2012-2013 was relegated as finished on 16th position. The season 2013-2014 will be playing on Football League.

=== Lokomotiv Plovdiv ===
On 2013 he signed a one-year contract with the Bulgarian team Lokomotiv Plodviv. He made his debut with the team on 22 September in a 2–0 home victory against Pirin Gotse Delchev. He scored his first goal with the team on 31 October in a 2–3 home loss against Levski Sofia.

=== Panthrakikos ===
In January 2015 Iliadis signed with Panthrakikos. On 1 July 2015, he renew his contract with the club.

=== Veria ===
In the last day of the January 2017 transfer window, the experienced midfielder signed a six months contract with the Super League Greece club Veria after Panthrakikos administration's decision to withdraw from Football League due to financial reasons.

== International career ==
He was part of the Greece U19 while playing at Apollon Kalamarias and then of the Greece U21 earning more than 10 caps.
