= Stelios Delibasis =

Greek footballer

Personal information
- Full name: Stylianos Delibasis
- Date of birth: 4 December 1987 (age 38)
- Place of birth: Rethymno, Crete, Greece
- Height: 1.77 m (5 ft 10 in)
- Position: Midfielder

Team information
- Current team: Episkopi
- Number: 8

Youth career
- 1996–2002: EA Rethymno
- 2002–2004: EAR 2000
- 2004–2005: Doxa Platane
- 2005–2007: PAOK

Senior career*
Years	Team	Apps	(Gls)
2007–2010	PAOK	0	(0)
2008–2009	→ Agrotikos Asteras (loan)	18	(0)
2009–2010	→ Kozani (loan)	28	(1)
2010–2011	Ionikos	29	(1)
2011–2012	Iraklis Psachna	22	(1)
2012–	Episkopi	32	(3)
- * Club domestic league appearances and goals as of 20:00, 23 June 2019(UTC)

Stylianos "Stelios" Delibasis (Greek: Στέλιος Δελήμπασης; born 4 December 1987) is a Greek footballer who currently plays for Episkopi in the Football League 2. He has previously played for Agrotikos Asteras and Kozani on loan from PAOK, as well as Ionikos and Iraklis Psachna.

== Career ==
=== Early career ===
Born in Rethymno, Delibasis started his youth career at EAR 2000's academies in 1996 and was promoted to the first team in 2002. In 2004, he moved to Delta Ethniki side Doxa Platane and stayed there for a year, moving to the youth team of PAOK in 2005.

=== PAOK ===
He was promoted to the first team of PAOK in 2007, but despite good performances in pre-season friendly matches, he was not deemed fit to play in competitive matches. PAOK proposed a loan move to Thermaikos in August, but Delibasis denied, as he wanted to fight for a place in the starting lineup.

A first team opportunity never came by, so in 2008 he was loaned out to Agrotikos Asteras in the Football League, for which he appeared in 18 league matches. In 2009, he joined Football League 2 side Kozani, again on loan – he made 28 appearances for the club, scoring a goal.

=== Ionikos ===
Delibasis was released from PAOK in July 2010 and joined Ionikos, who were playing in the Football League at the time. There, he made 29 league appearances and scored the winning goal in a home match against Anagennisi Karditsa – in the season's end however, Ionikos were relegated to the Football League 2 due to forgery, and Delibasis was subsequently released.

=== Iraklis Psachna ===
In 2011, Delibasis joined Evia-based Iraklis Psachna, who were recently promoted to the Football League. He made 22 league appearances for the club, scoring one goal in an away game against Vyzas which ended 1–1.

=== Episkopi ===
After seven years away from Rethymno, Delibasis returned to his hometown in summer 2012 to play for local team Episkopi, who were promoted to the Football League 2 for the first time in history.
