= Ricardo Verón =

Argentine footballer

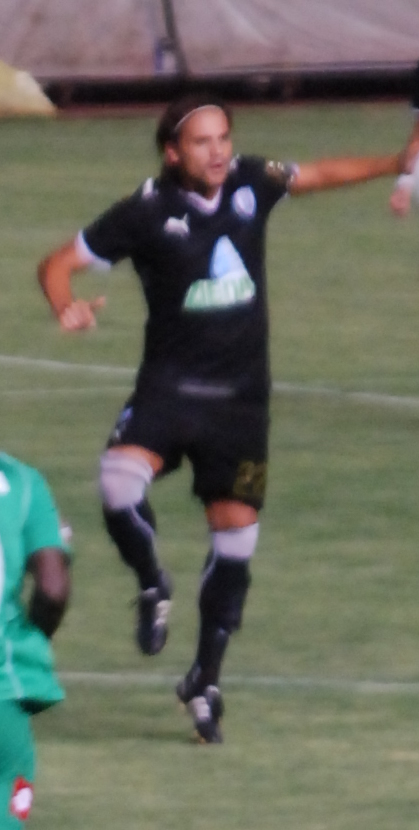
- Ricardo Verón with PAOK in 2009

Personal information
- Full name: Ricardo Matias Verón
- Date of birth: January 22, 1981 (age 45)
- Place of birth: Santa Fe, Argentina
- Height: 5 ft 8 in (1.73 m)
- Position: Defensive midfielder

Senior career*
Years	Team	Apps	(Gls)
1999–2001	San Lorenzo	17	(0)
2001–2003	Reggina	44	(0)
2003–2004	→ Salernitana (loan)	5	(0)
2004–2007	Reggina	1	(0)
2005	→ Lanús (loan)	10	(0)
2006	→ San Lorenzo (loan)	5	(0)
2006–2007	→ Crotone (loan)	25	(2)
2007	Siena	0	(0)
2008–2010	PAOK	43	(1)
2010–2014	OFI	88	(37)
2014	Kissamikos	0	(0)
Total		228	(50)
- * Club domestic league appearances and goals

Ricardo Matias Verón (born 22 January 1981 in Santa Fe) is an Argentine football midfielder.

== Career ==
Verón started his professional career at San Lorenzo in the Primera Division Argentina in 1999. In 2001, he was sold to Reggina. He has spent time on loan at Salernitana in Italy, at Lanús and San Lorenzo in Argentina, at Serie B side F.C. Crotone. He played in Siena on a co-ownership deal with Reggina.

On 22 January 2008, incidentally his birthday, Veron signed for Greek club PAOK on a loan deal. After a quite successful 6-month period, PAOK came to terms with Siena and Matias signed a new three-year contract, in the summer of 2008. He has gradually become a mainstay in the midfield, being one of the most-capped players of the 2008–09 season.

The 2009–10 season has not been equally successful though, as Veron has fallen out of favor and rarely makes any appearances, even as a substitute. In July 2010, a new chapter in Veron's career started, as he moved to OFI, the historic club from Crete, Greece.

== Clausura 2001 ==
The highlight of his career to date was being part of the San Lorenzo squad that won the 2001 Primera Division Clausura tournament.
