= Toni González =

Spanish footballer (born 1982)

Personal information
- Full name: Antonio González Rodríguez
- Date of birth: 7 January 1982 (age 44)
- Place of birth: Albacete, Spain
- Height: 1.76 m (5 ft 9 in)
- Positions: Attacking midfielder; winger

Youth career
- Mallorca

Senior career*
Years	Team	Apps	(Gls)
2001–2003	Mallorca B	59	(2)
2003–2006	Mallorca	14	(0)
2004–2005	→ Ciudad Murcia (loan)	24	(3)
2005–2006	→ Oviedo (loan)	20	(0)
2006–2008	PAOK	36	(2)
2008–2009	Ionikos	24	(5)
2009–2011	Doxa Drama	53	(3)
2011–2012	AEL	17	(0)
2012–2013	AEL Kalloni	14	(1)
Total		261	(16)
- * Club domestic league appearances and goals

Antonio "Toni" González Rodríguez (born 7 January 1982) is a Spanish retired footballer who played as an attacking midfielder.

== Football career ==
Born in Albacete, Castile-La Mancha, González made his professional debuts with RCD Mallorca in the 2003–04 season, playing in La Liga with the club and adding seven appearances in the campaign's UEFA Cup, scoring in away wins against APOEL FC (2–1) and FC Spartak Moscow (3–0) as the Balearic Islands side reached the last-16.

Subsequently, González spent several seasons loaned, with Ciudad de Murcia in the second division and Real Oviedo in the third. Released by Mallorca in 2006 he moved to Greece, playing with PAOK in the Super League and three teams in the second level, achieving promotion in the latter competition in 2011 with Doxa Drama.
