= Christos Melissis =

Greek footballer

Personal information
- Full name: Christos Melissis
- Date of birth: 1 December 1982 (age 43)
- Place of birth: Edessa, Greece
- Height: 1.84 m (6 ft 0 in)
- Position: Defender

Team information
- Current team: Thyella Sarakinon

Senior career*
Years	Team	Apps	(Gls)
2000–2001	Naoussa	31	(0)
2001–2006	Panserraikos	101	(4)
2006–2008	PAOK	54	(3)
2008–2012	Panathinaikos	10	(0)
2009–2010	→ AEL (loan)	28	(1)
2010–2011	→ Marítimo (loan)	0	(0)
2011	→ AEL (loan)	8	(0)
2012–2013	Panthrakikos	7	(0)
2013–2014	Olympiacos Volos	33	(1)
2014–2016	Panthrakikos	40	(1)
2016–2017	Veria	7	(0)
2017–2018	Al-Hilal Omdurman	?	(?)
2018–2019	Asteras Itea F.C.	?	(?)
2019–	Thyella Sarakinon	?	(?)

International career^{‡}
2008	Greece	2	(0)
- * Club domestic league appearances and goals as of 5 February 2017 ‡ National team caps and goals as of 18:06, 2 February 2017 (UTC)

Christos Melissis, (Greek: Χρήστος Μελίσσης; born 1 December 1982) is a Greek football player who played for Sudanese club Al-Hilal Omdurman. He has played in the past for Naoussa, Panserraikos, PAOK, Panathinaikos, AEL, Panthrakikos, Marítimo in Portugal and the Greek national team. He usually plays as a center back but when called upon he is used as a right back or a defensive midfielder.

== Club career ==
He started his career in Naoussa, and then played for five years in Panserraikos before attracting the interesting of PAOK. He was signed by PAOK in January 2006 and has become an important first team player ever since. He scored his first goal for PAOK in a home game versus Aris FC in 2007.

In the last games of the 2007–08 season, he was named captain of the PAOK squad, indicating his role for the years to come and rewarding his commitment.

On 28 July 2008 he was transferred from PAOK to Panathinaikos for a fee of €2,000,000 plus Filippos Darlas. He played in 11 games of the team's 2008–09 season but his appearances were not convincing and on 31 August 2009 he was loaned to AEL for one year, making a total of 29 appearances and scoring 1 goal.

On 31 September 2010, Melissis completed a loan move to the Portuguese Club Sport Marítimo, but failed to make a single appearance for the club. On 19 January 2011, he rejoined his old club Larissa on loan.

After having not appeared in a single league game for Panathinaikos during the 2011–12 season, Melissis left the club after his contract ran out in June 2012.

In summer 2013, Melissis signed a contract with Olympiacos Volos He made his debut against Glyfada and he scored his first goal against Fostiras in a 5–1 home win. In January 2015, he signed a 1,5-year contract with Panthrakikos returning to Super League Greece after a year. On 11 January 2015, he debuted with the club in a 1–1 home draw against Atromitos. On 28 November 2015, he scored in a surprise away victory for Panthrakikos, its first at 2015–16 season against Atromitos helping his club to escape with a 2–1 win.

On 24 June 2016, Melissis signed a one-year contract with Super League side Veria F.C.

On 26 October 2017, Melissis signed a two-years contract with Sudanese club Al-Hilal Omdurman

== International career ==
He was called to play for Greece for the first time on 1 February 2008, and made his debut against the Czech Republic on 5 February. He was recalled to the national team for a friendly against Cyprus and so on 19 May 2008, he earned his second cap coming on as a second-half substitute.
