= Nikos Arabatzis =

Greek footballer (born 1984)

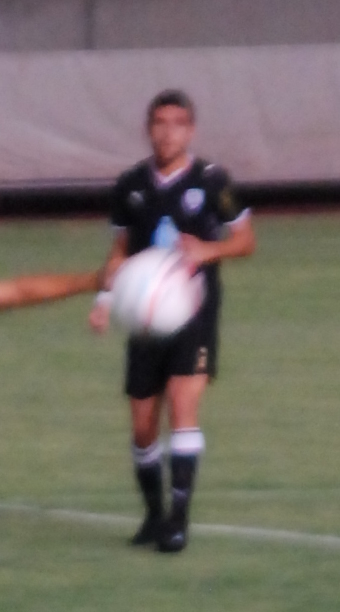

Personal information
- Full name: Nikolaos Arabatzis
- Date of birth: 10 March 1984 (age 42)
- Place of birth: Kato Mitrousi, Serres, Greece
- Height: 1.75 m (5 ft 9 in)
- Position: Right full back

Team information
- Current team: Hellas München

Youth career
- 1997–2000: Thrakikos Ano Mitrousi

Senior career*
Years	Team	Apps	(Gls)
2000–2005	Panserraikos	98	(8)
2006–2010	PAOK	69	(3)
2010–2011	Iraklis	26	(0)
2011–2012	AEL	12	(0)
2012–2013	Ethnikos Achnas	11	(0)
2013	Panetolikos	24	(0)
2013–2014	AEL	0	(0)
2014–2016	Aiginiakos	23	(0)
2016–2017	A.E. Lefkimmi	0	(0)
2017–2020	AEG Dachau		
2020–	Hellas München		

International career
2003	Greece U19	2	(1)
2006	Greece U21	7	(0)
- * Club domestic league appearances and goals as of 01:48, 18 August 2013 (UTC)

Nikos Arabatzis (Greek: Νίκος Αραμπατζής; born 10 March 1984) is a Greek footballer currently playing for Hellas München. He usually plays as a right defender but past coaches have also used him as a right midfielder, making him a modern full-back. He is known for his pace and crossing.

While still in Panserraikos he became member of Greece U21.

In the 2006 winter transfer window he was bought by PAOK and has made an instant impact. He attracted the interest of AEK Athens but the bid of 900.000 euros was rejected to the delight of PAOK fans. He was unlucky, as he had a serious knee injury in the summer of 2007 and had to undergo surgery, for the second time in his career in his right knee. He didn't manage to take part in any game of the 2007–8 season.

On 2 August 2010 he signed a two-year contract with Iraklis. Then, in August 2011 after good performances, he signed with AEL. In summer 2012 he tried his luck in Cyprus with Ethnikos Achnas where he had a successful season start. Later, In January 2013, he signed a 6-month contract with Panetolikos, helping the team gain the promotion to the Super League Greece. In August 2013, he returned once more to AEL.
