= Dimitrios Kyriakidis =

Greek footballer (born 1986)

Dimitris Kyriakidis
Personal information
- Full name: Dimitrios Kyriakidis
- Date of birth: 24 September 1986 (age 40)
- Place of birth: Kavala, Greece
- Height: 1.86 m (6 ft 1 in)
- Position: Goalkeeper

Youth career
- 2001–2004: Nestos Chrysoupolis

Senior career*
Years	Team	Apps	(Gls)
2004–2010	PAOK	0	(0)
2008–2009	→ Agrotikos Asteras (loan)	24	(0)
2009–2010	→ Panserraikos (loan)	15	(0)
2010–2013	Levadiakos	82	(0)
2013–2015	Skoda Xanthi	41	(0)
2015–2020	Panetolikos	102	(0)
2020–2021	Karmiotissa	13	(0)
2021–2022	Kozani	21	(0)
2022–2023	Poseidon Nea Michaniona		

International career
2007	Greece U21	1	(0)
- * Club domestic league appearances and goals

Dimitrios Kyriakidis (Greek: Δημήτριος Κυριακίδης; born 24 June 1986) is a Greek former professional footballer who played as a goalkeeper.

He previously played for PAOK, Agrotikos Asteras, Panserraikos, Levadiakos, Skoda Xanthi and Panetolikos.

== Club career ==
In the 2007–08 season he made his first appearance for PAOK in a Greek Cup game against Thraysvoulos.

At the end of the 2015–16 Super League regular season, Kyriakidis was voted as the second best goalkeeper in the league. On 29 January 2017, he renewed his contract with Panetolikos till the summer of 2020.

In the summer 2023, Kyriakidis announced his retirement.

== International career ==
He was part of the Greece national under-21 football team for two years earning 3 caps. In November 2016 Kyriakidis received his first call-up to the senior Greece squad for matches against Belarus and Bosnia and Herzegovina. He was a surprise call-up by Michael Skibbe for a World Cup qualifier in March 2017, but did not play.
