= 2003–04 PAOK FC season =

PAOK
2003–04 season
- Chairman: Giannis Goumenos
- Manager: Angelos Anastasiadis
- Stadium: Toumba Stadium
- Alpha Ethniki: 3rd
- Greek Cup: Third round
- UEFA Cup: Second round
- Top goalscorer: League: Dimitris Salpingidis (16); All: Dimitris Salpingidis (18)
Home colours	Away colours

The 2003–04 season was PAOK Football Club's 78th in existence and the club's 45th consecutive season in the top flight of Greek football. The team will enter the Greek Football Cup in the First round and will also enter in UEFA Cup starting from the First round.

== Players ==
=== Squad ===
Note: Flags indicate national team as defined under FIFA eligibility rules; some limited exceptions apply. Players may hold more than one non-FIFA nationality.

No.	Pos.	Nation	Player
1	GK	GRE	Ilias Atmatsidis
15	GK	GRE	Vangelis Pourliotopoulos
29	GK	GRE	Kostas Andriopoulos
33	GK	GRE	Kyriakos Tohouroglou
50	GK	GRE	Christos Lambakis
55	GK	POR	Daniel Fernandes
3	DF	GRE	Vangelis Koutsopoulos
4	DF	GRE	Leonidas Vokolos
5	DF	GRE	Vaggelis Nastos
16	DF	GRE	Fotis Kiskabanis
23	DF	GRE	Dionysis Chasiotis
24	DF	NGR	Ifeanyi Udeze
26	DF	GRE	Giorgos Zisopoulos
32	DF	GRE	Christos Karipidis
99	DF	GRE	Petros Konteon
5	MF	GRE	Christos Maladenis
6	MF	GRE	Dimitris Markos
8	MF	GRE	Dimitris Zavadias
13	MF	GRE	Giorgos Theodoridis

No.	Pos.	Nation	Player
14	MF	GRE	Giorgos Koutsis
16	MF	NGR	Napoleon Amaefule
18	MF	GRE	Lambros Vangelis
19	MF	GRE	Ilias Eleftheriadis
20	MF	SCG	Sladan Spasic
21	MF	GRE	Loukas Karadimos
22	MF	CMR	Guy Feutchine
28	MF	CYP	Alexandros Garpozis
30	MF	CYP	Panagiotis Engomitis
44	MF	GHA	Ebenezer Hagan
80	MF	CYP	Liasos Louka
84	MF	GRE	Georgios Makris
88	MF	GRE	Ryan Kapagiannidis
7	FW	CYP	Stefanos Voskaridis
9	FW	GRE	Dimitris Salpingidis
11	FW	CYP	Yiasoumis Yiasoumi
25	FW	NGR	Thankgod Amaefule
27	FW	GRE	Christos Balodimos
31	FW	GRE	Michalis Giannitsanakis

== Transfers ==
Players transferred in

Transfer Window	Pos.	Name	Club	Fee
Summer	DF	(Nigeria) Ifeanyi Udeze	(England) West Brom	End of loan
Summer	FW	(Greece) M. Giannitsanakis	(Greece) Aris Soudas	Free
Summer	FW	(Nigeria) Thankgod Amaefule	(Poland) Okęcie Warszawa	Free
Summer	FW	(Greece) Christos Balodimos	(Greece) Iraklis K20	Free
Summer	MF	(Ghana) Ebenezer Hagan	(Greece) Iraklis	Free
Summer	MF	(Greece) Lambros Vangelis	(Italy) Siena	Free
Summer	DF	(Greece) Leonidas Vokolos	(Greece) Panathinaikos	Free
Summer	MF	(Nigeria) Napoleon Amaefule	(Poland) Polonia Warsaw	Free
Summer	DF	(Greece) Stelios Malezas	(Greece) Pontioi Katerini	50K
Summer	DF	(Greece) Christos Karipidis	(Greece) Kerkyra	End of loan
Winter	MF	(Cyprus) Liasos Louka	(Cyprus) Nea Salamis	150K
Winter	GK	(Portugal) Daniel Fernandes	(Spain) Celta de Vigo B	Free
Winter	MF	(Cyprus) Alexandros Garpozis	(Cyprus) AEL Limassol	Free
Winter	DF	(Greece) Giorgos Zisopoulos	(Greece) Aris	Free
Winter	GK	(Greece) Christos Lambakis	(Greece) Aris	Free
Winter	MF	(Greece) Christos Maladenis	(Greece) AEK Athens	Free

Players transferred out

Transfer Window	Pos.	Name	Club	Fee
Summer	MF	(Greece) Georgios Georgiadis	(Greece) Olympiacos	Free
Summer	MF	(Greece) Pantelis Kafes	(Greece) Olympiacos	Free
Summer	FW	(Greece) Nikolaos Frousos	(Greece) Ionikos	Free
Summer	FW	(Greece) Ioannis Okkas	(Greece) AEK Athens	Free
Summer	DF	(Ghana) Koffi Amponsah	(Greece) AEK Athens	Free
Summer	MF	(Poland) Mariusz Kukiełka	(Germany) Nürnberg	Free
Summer	DF	(Greece) Petros Kanakoudis	(Greece) ILTEX Lykoi	Free
Summer	MF	(France) Aboubacar Fofana	(Italy) Juventus	End of Loan
Winter	DF	(Greece) Vaggelis Nastos	(Italy) Perugia	Free
Winter	MF	(Nigeria) Napoleon Amaefule	(Nigeria) Shooting Stars	Free

== Competitions ==
=== Overview ===
Competition	Record							
Competition	Pld	W	D	L	GF	GA	GD	Win %
Alpha Ethniki	30	18	6	6	47	27	+20	60.00
Greek Cup	6	2	3	1	7	4	+3	33.33
UEFA Cup	4	1	2	1	4	2	+2	25.00
Total	40	21	11	8	58	33	+25	52.50

Source: Competitions

== Alpha Ethniki ==
=== League table ===
Pos	Team	Pld	W	D	L	GF	GA	GD	Pts	Qualification or relegation
1	Panathinaikos (C)	30	24	5	1	62	18	+44	77	Qualification for Champions League group stage
2	Olympiacos	30	24	3	3	70	19	+51	75	Qualification for Champions League group stage
3	PAOK	30	18	6	6	47	27	+20	60	Qualification for Champions League third qualifying round
4	AEK Athens	30	16	7	7	57	32	+25	55	Qualification for UEFA Cup first round
5	Egaleo	30	15	7	8	37	26	+11	52	Qualification for UEFA Cup first round

Source: Galanis Sports Data
Rules for classification: 1st points; 2nd head-to-head points; 3rd head-to-head goal difference; 4th decision match.
(C) Champions

==== Results summary ====
Overall								Home						Away					
Pld	W	D	L	GF	GA	GD	Pts	W	D	L	GF	GA	GD	W	D	L	GF	GA	GD
30	18	6	6	47	27	+20	60	10	3	2	27	11	+16	8	3	4	20	16	+4

Last updated: 22 May 2004.
Source: Competitive matches

==== Results by round ====
Round	1	2	3	4	5	6	7	8	9	10	11	12	13	14	15	16	17	18	19	20	21	22	23	24	25	26	27	28	29	30
Ground	H	H	A	H	A	H	A	H	A	A	H	A	H	A	H	A	A	H	A	H	A	H	A	H	H	A	H	A	H	A
Result	L	W	W	D	W	D	W	W	L	W	W	L	W	W	W	W	D	D	W	W	D	W	W	W	W	L	L	L	W	D
Position	15	8	4	6	3	4	4	3	3	3	3	4	4	4	3	3	3	3	3	3	3	3	3	3	3	3	3	3	3	3

Source: League matches
A = Away; H = Home; W = Win; D = Draw; L = Loss

==== Matches ====
Win Draw Loss

24 August 2003 1	PAOK	0–2	Olympiacos	Thessaloniki
18:15 EET	(penalty missed) 66' Yiasoumis Yiasoumi		18' Georgios Georgiadis; 76' Pantelis Kafes	Stadium: Toumba Stadium; Attendance: Cl. doors

31 August 2003 2	PAOK	2–0	Egaleo	Thessaloniki
18:15 EET	Panagiotis Engomitis 24'; Dimitris Salpingidis 77'			Stadium: Toumba Stadium; Attendance: 7.368

14 September 2003 3	Akratitos	1–2	PAOK	Athens
18:00 EET	Panagiotis Gitsis 88'		22' Guy Feutchine; 87' Panagiotis Engomitis	Stadium: Yiannis Pathiakakis Stadium; Attendance: 2.180

21 September 2003 4	PAOK	0–0	Proodeftiki	Thessaloniki
18:00 EET				Stadium: Toumba Stadium; Attendance: 6.166

28 September 2003 5	Paniliakos	1–4	PAOK	Pyrgos
16:00 EET	Athanasios Tsigas 90'		18' Dimitris Markos; 21', 87' Dimitris Salpingidis; 60' Panagiotis Engomitis	Stadium: Pyrgos Stadium; Attendance: 2.320

4 October 2003 6	PAOK	1–1	Xanthi	Thessaloniki
18:00 EET	Dimitris Markos 5'		16' (pen.) Günter Friesenbichler	Stadium: Toumba Stadium; Attendance: 4.707

19 October 2003 7	OFI	0–3	PAOK	Heraklion
15:45 EET			45' Dimitris Salpingidis; 68' Michalis Giannitsanakis; 77' Ebenezer Hagan	Stadium: Theodoros Vardinogiannis Stadium; Attendance: 2.725

26 October 2003 8	PAOK	2–1	Kallithea	Thessaloniki
16:00 EET	Dimitris Zavadias 27' (pen.); Dimitris Salpingidis 32'		40' Giannis Tatsis	Stadium: Toumba Stadium; Attendance: Cl. doors

1 November 2003 9	AEK Athens	3–1	PAOK	Athens
18:00 EET	Nikos Liberopoulos 16'; Ioannis Okkas 63'; Vasilios Lakis 89'		83' Dimitris Salpingidis	Stadium: Yiannis Pathiakakis Stadium; Attendance: 2.134

9 November 2003 10	Ionikos	0–1	PAOK	Piraeus
18:00 EET			8' Giorgos Koutsis	Stadium: Neapoli Stadium; Attendance: 1.031

23 November 2003 11	PAOK	2–0	Iraklis	Thessaloniki
19:15 EET	Yiasoumis Yiasoumi 47'; Dimitris Salpingidis 73' (pen.)			Stadium: Toumba Stadium; Attendance: 12.284

30 November 2003 12	Panathinaikos	3–0	PAOK	Athens
19:00 EET	Dimitrios Papadopoulos 20'; Jan Michaelsen 37'; Giannis Goumas 45'			Stadium: Leoforos Alexandras Stadium; Attendance: 9.658

7 December 2003 13	PAOK	2–0	Panionios	Thessaloniki
19:00 EET	Giorgos Koutsis 2'; Yiasoumis Yiasoumi 58'			Stadium: Toumba Stadium; Attendance: 2.163

13 December 2003 14	Chalkidona	1–2	PAOK	Athens
18:00 EET	Guy Feutchine 13' (o.g.)		57' Giorgos Koutsis; 70' Yiasoumis Yiasoumi	Stadium: Nikaia Stadium; Attendance: 779

21 December 2003 15	PAOK	3–0	Aris	Thessaloniki
16:00 EET	Yiasoumis Yiasoumi 48'; Dimitris Salpingidis 54'; Giorgos Koutsis 86'			Stadium: Toumba Stadium; Attendance: 13.950

11 January 2004 16	Olympiacos	1–2	PAOK	Athens
18:00 EET	Nery Castillo 67'		68' Dimitris Salpingidis; 87' Sladan Spasic	Stadium: Georgios Kamaras Stadium; Attendance: 9.164

17 January 2004 17	Egaleo	0–0	PAOK	Athens
18:00 EET				Stadium: Stavros Mavrothalassitis Stadium; Attendance: 1.568

24 January 2004 18	PAOK	2–2	Akratitos	Thessaloniki
16:00 EET	Dimitris Salpingidis (penalty missed) 31' 89'; Guy Feutchine 73'		19' Panagiotis Gitsis; 80' Erik Lincar	Stadium: Toumba Stadium; Attendance: 3.393

1 February 2004 19	Proodeftiki	1–3	PAOK	Piraeus
15:45 EET	Vangelis Togias 36'		48' Dimitris Salpingidis; 58' Dionysis Chasiotis; 68' Ebenezer Hagan	Stadium: Nikaia Municipal Gymnasium; Attendance: 1.816

8 February 2004 20	PAOK	3–0	Paniliakos	Thessaloniki
18:00 EET	Dimitris Salpingidis 27'; Giorgos Koutsis 44'; Christos Maladenis 83'			Stadium: Toumba Stadium; Attendance: 12.331

21 February 2004 21	Xanthi	0–0	PAOK	Xanthi
15:00 EET		Report		Stadium: Xanthi Ground; Attendance: 7.052

29 February 2004 22	PAOK	2–0	OFI	Thessaloniki
15:00 EET	Yiasoumis Yiasoumi 29'; Dimitris Salpingidis 53'	Report		Stadium: Toumba Stadium; Attendance: 11.417

14 March 2004 23	Kallithea	0–1	PAOK	Athens
15:00 EET		Report	41' Sladan Spasic	Stadium: Grigoris Lambrakis Stadium; Attendance: 1.873

21 March 2004 24	PAOK	3–2	AEK Athens	Thessaloniki
17:00 EET	Yiasoumis Yiasoumi 44', 45'; Dimitris Salpingidis 57'	Report	34', 42' Nikos Liberopoulos	Stadium: Toumba Stadium; Attendance: 24.829

4 April 2004 25	PAOK	2–0	Ionikos	Thessaloniki
16:00 EET	Dimitris Salpingidis 33' (pen.), 84'	Report		Stadium: Toumba Stadium; Attendance: 6.687

18 April 2004 26	Iraklis	3–0	PAOK	Thessaloniki
17:00 EET	Marcin Mieciel 4'; Nikos Machlas 13'; Edvin Murati 23'	Report		Stadium: Makedonikos Stadium; Attendance: 4.824

25 April 2004 27	PAOK	1–2	Panathinaikos	Thessaloniki
17:00 EET	Ebenezer Hagan 7'	Report	48' Dimitrios Papadopoulos; 90' Emmanuel Olisadebe	Stadium: Toumba Stadium; Attendance: 17.805

2 May 2004 28	Panionios	1–0	PAOK	Nea Smyrni, Athens
17:00 EET	Alain Raguel 22'	Report		Stadium: Nea Smyrni Stadium; Attendance: 2.251

16 May 2004 29	PAOK	2–1	Chalkidona	Thessaloniki
17:00 EET	Ebenezer Hagan 50'; Sladan Spasic 86'	Report	76' Dimosthenis Manousakis	Stadium: Toumba Stadium; Attendance: 8.312

22 May 2004 30	Aris	1–1	PAOK	Thessaloniki
17:15 EET	Georgios Kousas 57'	Report	21' Lambros Vangelis	Stadium: Makedonikos Stadium; Attendance: 1.074

== Greek Cup ==
=== First round ===
9 August 2003 First leg	PAOK	1–1	AEL	Thessaloniki
13:00 EEST	Yiasoumi 9'	Report (page 4)	Tsakmakidis 41'	Stadium: Toumba Stadium; Referee: Dimitris Dabosis (Pieria)

19 August 2003 Second leg	AEL	0–3 (1–4 agg.)	PAOK	Kozani
13:00 EEST		Report (page 4-5)	Hagan 13'; Spasić 41'; Yiasoumi 70'	Stadium: Kozani Stadium; Referee: Makis Efthimiadis (Drama)

=== Second round ===
17 September 2003 First leg	Egaleo	1–1	PAOK	Aigaleo
16:45 EEST	Agritis 8'	Report (page 11)	Salpingidis 80'	Stadium: Stavros Mavrothalassitis Stadium; Referee: Giannis Spyropoulos (Phthiotis)

29 October 2003 Second leg	PAOK	1–0 (2–1 agg.)	Egaleo	Thessaloniki
19:00 EET	Salpingidis 14'	Report (page 11)		Stadium: Toumba Stadium; Referee: Giorgos Takidis (Kilkis)

=== Round of 16 ===
7 January 2004 First leg	PAOK	0–1	Kastoria	Thessaloniki
17:00 EET		Report (page 16)	Kapetanopoulos 23' (pen.)	Stadium: Toumba Stadium; Referee: Dimitris Dabosis (Pieria)

14 January 2004 Second leg	Kastoria	1–1 (2–1 agg.)	PAOK	Kastoria
14:30 EET	Panteliadis 62'	Report (page 16)	Yiasoumi 41'	Stadium: Municipal Stadium of Kastoria; Referee: Efthimios Damianos (Kozani)

== UEFA Cup ==
=== First round ===
24 September 2003 1st leg	PAOK (Greece)	0–1	(Norway) Lyn	Thessaloniki, Greece
20:30 CET		Report	39' Helgi Sigurðsson	Stadium: Toumba Stadium; Referee: (Hungary) Hanacsek

15 October 2003 2nd leg	Lyn (Norway)	0–3 (1–3 agg.)	(Greece) PAOK	Oslo, Norway
19:00 CET		Report	51' Yiasoumis Yiasoumi; 61' Giorgos Koutsis; 68' Leonidas Vokolos	Stadium: Ullevaal Stadion; Referee: (Slovakia) Darko Čeferin

=== Second round ===
6 November 2003 1st leg	PAOK (Greece)	1–1	(Hungary) Debrecen	Thessaloniki, Greece
20:30 CET	Karadimos 8'	Report	25' Bajzát	Stadium: Toumba Stadium; Referee: (Croatia) Edo Trivković

27 November 2003 2nd leg	Debrecen (Hungary)	0–0 (1a–1 agg.)	(Greece) PAOK	Debrecen, Hungary
17:00 CET		Report		Stadium: Stadion Oláh Gábor Út; Referee: (Israel) Alon Yefet

== Statistics ==
=== Squad statistics ===
As of 22 May 2004

Appearances denote players in the starting lineup, with the numbers in parentheses denoting appearances as substitute.

No.	Name	Alpha Ethniki		Greek Cup		UEFA Cup		Total	
No.	Name	Apps	Goals	Apps	Goals	Apps	Goals	Apps	Goals
Goalkeepers
1	(Greece) Ilias Atmatsidis	20 (2)	0	3	0	4	0	27 (2)	0
29	(Greece) Kostas Andriopoulos	1	0	0	0	0	0	1	0
33	(Greece) Kyriakos Tohouroglou	12 (1)	0	3	0	0	0	15 (1)	0
Defenders
3	(Greece) Vangelis Koutsopoulos	24 (4)	0	3	0	4 (1)	0	31 (5)	0
4	(Greece) Leonidas Vokolos	28	0	6	0	4	1	38	1
5	(Greece) Vaggelis Nastos	0	0	1 (1)	0	0	0	1 (1)	0
16	(Greece) Fotis Kiskabanis	1 (1)	0	0	0	0	0	1 (1)	0
23	(Greece) Dionysis Chasiotis	24 (2)	1	3	0	3	0	30 (2)	1
24	(Nigeria) Ifeanyi Udeze	17 (1)	0	2	0	4	0	23 (1)	0
26	(Greece) Giorgos Zisopoulos	1 (1)	0	0	0	0	0	1 (1)	0
32	(Greece) Christos Karipidis	15 (8)	0	5 (2)	0	1	0	21 (10)	0
99	(Greece) Petros Konteon	7 (6)	0	1 (1)	0	0	0	8 (7)	0
Midfielders
5	(Greece) Christos Maladenis	9	1	0	0	0	0	9	1
6	(Greece) Dimitris Markos	9 (1)	2	3	0	2	0	14 (1)	2
8	(Greece) Dimitris Zavadias	5 (2)	1	1	0	0	0	6 (2)	1
10	(Greece) Giorgos Theodoridis	20 (13)	0	6 (2)	0	0	0	26 (15)	0
14	(Greece) Giorgos Koutsis	25	5	3	0	2	1	30	6
16	(Nigeria) Napoleon Amaefule	8 (6)	0	1	0	0	0	9 (6)	0
18	(Greece) Lambros Vangelis	14 (4)	1	4 (1)	0	3 (1)	0	21 (6)	1
19	(Greece) Ilias Eleftheriadis	3 (2)	0	0	0	0	0	3 (2)	0
20	(Serbia and Montenegro) Sladan Spasic	17 (5)	3	4 (1)	1	4 (4)	0	25 (10)	4
21	(Greece) Loukas Karadimos	15 (3)	0	6 (2)	0	3 (1)	1	24 (6)	1
22	(Cameroon) Guy Feutchine	27	2	4	0	4	0	35	2
28	(Cyprus) Alexandros Garpozis	6 (5)	0	0	0	0	0	6 (5)	0
30	(Cyprus) Panagiotis Engomitis	8 (2)	3	2 (1)	0	1	0	11 (3)	3
44	(Ghana) Ebenezer Hagan	26 (2)	4	4	1	4	0	34 (2)	5
80	(Cyprus) Liasos Louka	2 (1)	0	0	0	0	0	2 (1)	0
84	(Greece) Georgios Makris	1 (1)	0	0	0	0	0	1 (1)	0
88	(Greece) Ryan Kapagiannidis	4 (2)	0	2	0	0	0	6 (2)	0
Forwards
7	(Cyprus) Stefanos Voskaridis	6 (6)	0	0	0	3 (3)	0	9 (9)	0
9	(Greece) Dimitris Salpingidis	29 (1)	16	4 (1)	2	4	0	37 (2)	18
11	(Cyprus) Yiasoumis Yiasoumi	26 (2)	7	6 (1)	3	4	1	36 (3)	11
27	(Greece) Christos Balodimos	1 (1)	0	1 (1)	0	0	0	2 (2)	0
31	(Greece) Michalis Giannitsanakis	8 (5)	1	4 (4)	0	2 (2)	0	14 (11)	1

Source: Match reports in competitive matches, uefa.com, epo.gr, worldfootball.net

=== Goalscorers ===
Rank	No.	Pos.	Player	Alpha Ethniki	Greek Cup	UEFA Cup	Total
1	9	FW	(Greece) Dimitris Salpingidis	16	2	0	18
2	11	FW	(Cyprus) Yiasoumis Yiasoumi	7	3	1	11
3	14	MF	(Greece) Giorgos Koutsis	5	0	1	6
4	44	MF	(Ghana) Ebenezer Hagan	4	1	0	5
5	20	MF	(Serbia and Montenegro) Sladan Spasic	3	1	0	4
6	30	MF	(Cyprus) Panagiotis Engomitis	3	0	0	3
7	22	MF	(Cameroon) Guy Feutchine	2	0	0	2
8	6	MF	(Greece) Dimitris Markos	2	0	0	2
9	31	FW	(Greece) M. Giannitsanakis	1	0	0	1
10	18	MF	(Greece) Lambros Vangelis	1	0	0	1
11	5	MF	(Greece) Christos Maladenis	1	0	0	1
12	23	DF	(Greece) Dionysis Chasiotis	1	0	0	1
13	8	MF	(Greece) Dimitris Zavadias	1	0	0	1
14	21	MF	(Greece) Loukas Karadimos	0	0	1	1
15	4	DF	(Greece) Leonidas Vokolos	0	0	1	1
Own goals				0	0	0	0
TOTALS				47	7	4	58

Source: Match reports in competitive matches, uefa.com, epo.gr, worldfootball.net
