= 2004–05 PAOK FC season =

PAOK
2004–05 season
- Chairman: Giannis Goumenos
- Manager: Angelos Anastasiadis, Rolf Fringer, Nikos Karageorgiou
- Stadium: Toumba Stadium
- Alpha Ethniki: 5th
- Greek Cup: Second round
- Champions League: Third qualifying round
- UEFA Cup: First round
- Top goalscorer: League: Dimitris Salpingidis (14); All: Dimitris Salpingidis (16)
Home colours	Away colours

The 2004–05 season was PAOK Football Club's 79th in existence and the club's 46th consecutive season in the top flight of Greek football. The team will enter the Greek Football Cup in the first round and will also enter in Champions League starting from the third qualifying round.

== Players ==
=== Squad ===
Note: Flags indicate national team as defined under FIFA eligibility rules; some limited exceptions apply. Players may hold more than one non-FIFA nationality.

No.	Pos.	Nation	Player
1	GK	GRE	Ilias Atmatsidis
33	GK	GRE	Kyriakos Tohouroglou
55	GK	POR	Daniel Fernandes
3	DF	GRE	Vangelis Koutsopoulos
4	DF	GRE	Leonidas Vokolos
13	DF	GRE	Giorgos Zisopoulos
16	DF	GRE	Paraskevas Andralas
23	DF	GRE	Dionysis Chasiotis
24	DF	NGR	Ifeanyi Udeze
32	DF	GRE	Christos Karipidis
66	DF	GRE	Petros Kanakoudis
77	DF	EGY	Amir Azmy
99	DF	GRE	Petros Konteon
5	MF	GRE	Christos Maladenis
6	MF	GRE	Dimitris Markos
8	MF	GRE	Dimitris Zavadias
10	MF	GRE	Giorgos Theodoridis

No.	Pos.	Nation	Player
14	MF	GRE	Giorgos Koutsis
16	MF	EGY	Shikabala
18	MF	GRE	Lambros Vangelis
19	MF	CYP	Alexandros Garpozis
20	MF	SCG	Sladan Spasic
21	MF	GRE	Loukas Karadimos
22	MF	CMR	Guy Feutchine
30	MF	CYP	Panagiotis Engomitis
31	MF	GRE	Dimitrios Zografakis
44	MF	GHA	Ebenezer Hagan
80	MF	CYP	Liasos Louka
7	FW	GRE	Nikos Skarmoutsos
9	FW	GRE	Dimitris Salpingidis
11	FW	CYP	Yiasoumis Yiasoumi
25	FW	NGR	Thankgod Amaefule
29	FW	GRE	Lazaros Christodoulopoulos
98	FW	POL	Marcin Mieciel

== Transfers ==
Players transferred in

Transfer window	Pos.	Name	Club	Fee
Summer	GK	(Greece) Dimitris Kyriakidis	(Greece) Νestos Hrisoupoli	Free
Summer	DF	(Greece) Paraskevas Andralas	(Greece) Proodeftiki	Free
Summer	FW	(Greece) Nikos Skarmoutsos	(Greece) Kallithea	100k
Winter	MF	(Egypt) Shikabala	(Egypt) Zamalek	250k
Winter	MF	(Egypt) Amir Azmy	(Egypt) Zamalek	150k
Winter	MF	(Greece) Dimitrios Zografakis	(Greece) Skoda Xanthi	250k
Winter	FW	(Poland) Marcin Mieciel	(Greece) Iraklis	Free

Players transferred out

Transfer window	Pos.	Name	Club	Fee
Summer	MF	(Greece) Georgios Makris	(Greece) Agrotikos Asteras	Free
Summer	MF	(Greece) Stelios Malezas	(Greece) Irodotos	Loan
Summer	FW	(Cyprus) Stefanos Voskaridis	(Greece) Ergotelis	Free
Summer	DF	(Greece) Petros Konteon	(Greece) Niki Volos	Loan
Summer	GK	(Greece) Pourliotopoulos	(Greece) Aris	Free
Summer	DF	(Greece) Fotis Kiskabanis	(Greece) Kastoria	Free
Summer	MF	(Greece) Ryan Kapagiannidis	(Greece) Agrotikos Asteras	Free
Summer	FW	(Greece) Giannitsanakis	(Greece) Proodeftiki	Loan
Summer	MF	(Greece) Ilias Eleftheriadis	(Greece) Ergotelis	Free
Summer	FW	(Greece) Christos Balodimos	(Greece) Thermaikos	Free
Winter	MF	(Cyprus) Alexandros Garpozis	(Greece) Xanthi	Free
Winter	FW	(Nigeria) Thankgod Amaefule	(Greece) Veria	Free
Winter	MF	(Ghana) Ebenezer Hagan	(Cyprus) APOEL	Free
Winter	DF	(Greece) Leonidas Vokolos	(Greece) Kallithea	Free
Winter	GK	(Greece) Christos Labakis	(Greece) Kerkyra	Free
Winter	MF	(Greece) Dimitris Markos		Free
Winter	MF	(Greece) Giorgos Koutsis	(Greece) Agrotikos Asteras	Free
Winter	FW	(Greece) Giannitsanakis	(Greece) Atsalenios	Free

== Competitions ==
=== Overview ===
Competition	Record							
Competition	Pld	W	D	L	GF	GA	GD	Win %
Alpha Ethniki	30	13	7	10	43	39	+4	43.33
Greek Cup	4	1	2	1	4	2	+2	25.00
UEFA Cup	2	0	0	2	3	5	−2	0.00
Champions League	2	0	0	2	0	4	−4	0.00
Total	38	14	9	15	50	50	+0	36.84

Source: Competitions

=== Managerial statistics ===
Head coach	From	To	Record							
Head coach	From	To	G	W	D	L	GF	GA	GD	Win %
(Greece) Angelos Anastasiadis	Start Season	26.09.2004	7	2	1	4	7	9	−2	28.57
(Austria) Rolf Fringer	27.09.2004	13.02.2005	19	6	5	8	23	26	−3	31.58
(Greece) Nikos Karageorgiou	17.02.2005	End season	12	6	3	3	20	15	+5	50.00

== Alpha Ethniki ==
=== League table ===
Pos	Team	Pld	W	D	L	GF	GA	GD	Pts	Qualification or relegation
3	AEK Athens	30	17	11	2	46	22	+24	62	Qualification for UEFA Cup first round
4	Skoda Xanthi	30	14	8	8	43	29	+14	50	Qualification for UEFA Cup first round
5	PAOK	30	13	7	10	43	39	+4	46	Qualification for UEFA Cup first round
6	Egaleo	30	11	12	7	31	26	+5	45	Qualification for Intertoto Cup third round
7	Iraklis	30	12	5	13	36	30	+6	41	

Source: Galanis Sports Data
Rules for classification: 1st points; 2nd head-to-head points; 3rd head-to-head goal difference; 4th decision match.

=== Results summary ===
Overall								Home						Away					
Pld	W	D	L	GF	GA	GD	Pts	W	D	L	GF	GA	GD	W	D	L	GF	GA	GD
30	13	7	10	43	39	+4	46	9	4	2	28	16	+12	4	3	8	15	23	−8

Last updated: 25 May 2005.
Source: Competitive matches

==== Results by round ====
Round	1	2	3	4	5	6	7	8	9	10	11	12	13	14	15	16	17	18	19	20	21	22	23	24	25	26	27	28	29	30
Ground	H	A	H	A	H	A	H	A	A	H	A	H	A	H	A	A	H	A	H	A	H	A	H	H	A	H	A	H	A	H
Result	W	L	W	D	D	L	L	L	W	D	D	W	L	W	L	W	W	L	W	W	D	W	W	W	L	W	D	D	L	L
Position	4	6	6	6	6	6	7	8	6	7	8	5	6	5	5	5	5	5	5	5	5	5	5	4	5	4	5	5	5	5

Source: League matches
A = Away; H = Home; W = Win; D = Draw; L = Loss

=== Matches ===
Win Draw Loss

19 September 2004 1	PAOK	1–0	Kerkyra	Thessaloniki
17:00 EET	Christos Maladenis 53' Manager: (Greece) Angelos Anastasiadis	Report	Manager: (Greece) Nikos Anastopoulos	Stadium: Toumba Stadium; Attendance: 3.369

26 September 2004 2	Panionios	2–0	PAOK	Nea Smyrni, Athens
17:00 EET	Mario Breska 53', 67' Manager: (Slovakia) Karol Pecze	Report	Manager: (Greece) Angelos Anastasiadis	Stadium: Nea Smyrni Stadium; Attendance: 2.335

3 October 2004 3	PAOK	1–0	Iraklis	Thessaloniki
19:00 EET	Guy Feutchine 45' Manager: (Austria) Rolf Fringer	Report	Manager: (Uruguay) Sergio Markarian	Stadium: Toumba Stadium; Attendance: 7.080

17 October 2004 4	Kallithea	1–1	PAOK	Athens
15:30 EET	Athanasios Tsigas 49' Manager: (Greece) Takis Lemonis	Report	61' Christos Karipidis Manager: (Austria) Rolf Fringer	Stadium: Grigoris Lambrakis Stadium; Attendance: 1.659

24 October 2004 5	PAOK	2–2	Aris	Thessaloniki
18:30 EET	Dimitris Salpingidis 28' (pen.); Christos Karipidis 80' Manager: (Austria) Rolf Fringer	Report	67' Fernando Sanjurjo; 82' Avraam Papadopoulos Manager: (Greece) Georgios Chatzaras	Stadium: Toumba Stadium; Attendance: 10.975

30 October 2004 6	Olympiacos	5–1	PAOK	Piraeus
17:00 EET	Giovanni 7'; Rivaldo 13', 26'; Predrag Dordevic 45'; Nery Castillo 90'	Report	65' Dimitris Salpingidis	Stadium: Georgios Karaiskakis Stadium; Attendance: 26.972

7 November 2004 7	PAOK	0–2	Ergotelis	Thessaloniki
15:00 EET	Manager: (Austria) Rolf Fringer	Report	63', 78' Patrick Ogunsoto Manager: (Greece) Myron Sifakis	Stadium: Toumba Stadium; Attendance: 1.561

21 November 2004 8	Chalkidona	2–0	PAOK	Athens
17:00 EET	Christos Iliopoulos 55'; Giorgos Zacharopoulos 90' Manager: (Greece) Georgios Paraschos	Report	Manager: (Austria) Rolf Fringer	Stadium: Peristeri Stadium; Attendance: 537

28 November 2004 9	Xanthi	0–2	PAOK	Xanthi
17:00 EET	Manager: (Greece) Giannis Matzourakis	Report	62' Christos Maladenis; 90' Dimitris Salpingidis Manager: (Austria) Rolf Fringer	Stadium: Xanthi FC Arena; Attendance: 3.335

5 December 2004 10	PAOK	1–1	AEK Athens	Thessaloniki
17:00 EET	Guy Feutchine 80' Manager: (Austria) Rolf Fringer	Report	57' Simos Krassas Manager: (Portugal) Fernando Santos	Stadium: Toumba Stadium; Attendance: 9.568

12 December 2004 11	OFI	2–2	PAOK	Heraklion
15:00 EET	Nikos Machlas 45'; Nikos Kounenakis 50' Manager: (Greece) Giannis Chatzinikolaou	Report	19' (pen.) Dimitris Salpingidis; 84' Christos Maladenis Manager: (Austria) Rolf Fringer	Stadium: Theodoros Vardinogiannis Stadium; Attendance: 3.010

19 December 2004 12	PAOK	3–0	Ionikos	Thessaloniki
15:00 EET	Guy Feutchine 30', 76'; Sladan Spasic 65' Manager: (Austria) Rolf Fringer	Report	Manager: (Greece) Vangelis Vlachos	Stadium: Toumba Stadium; Attendance: Cl. doors

29 December 2004 13	Panathinaikos	2–1	PAOK	Athens
17:30 EET	Giannis Goumas 38'; Michalis Konstantinou 86' Manager: (Czech Republic) Zdenek Scasny	Report	34' Paraskevas Andralas Manager: (Austria) Rolf Fringer	Stadium: Leoforos Alexandras Stadium; Attendance: 11.001

9 January 2005 14	PAOK	5–2	Apollon Kalamarias	Thessaloniki
15:00 EET	Dionysis Chasiotis 15'; Christos Maladenis 34', 42'; Sladan Spasic 40'; Dimitris Salpingidis 73' Manager: (Austria) Rolf Fringer	Report	23' Cleyton; 47' Stelios Iliadis Manager: (Serbia and Montenegro) Dragan Kokotovic	Stadium: Toumba Stadium; Attendance: 3.528

15 January 2005 15	Egaleo	2–1	PAOK	Athens
17:00 EET	Thomas Makris 65'; Nikos Nikolopoulos 70' Manager: (Greece) Telis Pistolis	Report	12' Dimitris Salpingidis Manager: (Austria) Rolf Fringer	Stadium: Stavros Mavrothalassitis Stadium; Attendance: 679

23 January 2005 16	Kerkyra	0–1	PAOK	Kerkyra
14:45 EET	Manager: (Greece) Manolis Papadopoulos	Report	74' Dimitris Salpingidis Manager: (Austria) Rolf Fringer	Stadium: Kerkyra Stadium; Attendance: 2.323

29 January 2005 17	PAOK	1–0	Panionios	Thessaloniki
15:00 EET	Dionysis Chasiotis 71' Manager: (Austria) Rolf Fringer	Report	Manager: (Greece) Georgios Vazakas	Stadium: Toumba Stadium; Attendance: 1.605

13 February 2005 18	Iraklis	1–0	PAOK	Thessaloniki
14:45 EET	Indrit Fortuzi 66' Manager: (Greece) Savvas Kofidis	Report	Manager: (Austria) Rolf Fringer	Stadium: Kaftanzoglio Stadium; Attendance: 7.519

20 February 2005 19	PAOK	3–1	Kallithea	Thessaloniki
16:30 EET	Loukas Karadimos 9'; Panagiotis Engomitis 68'; Sladan Spasic 90' Manager: (Greece) Nikos Karageorgiou	Report	34' Christos Koutsospyros Manager: (Greece) Takis Lemonis	Stadium: Toumba Stadium; Attendance: 2.810

27 February 2005 20	Aris	1–3	PAOK	Thessaloniki
17:00 EET	Emmanuel Ekwueme 63' Manager: (Greece) Georgios Chatzaras	Report	5', 37' Marcin Mieciel; 11' Christos Maladenis Manager: (Greece) Nikos Karageorgiou	Stadium: Kleanthis Vikelidis Stadium; Attendance: 10.202

6 March 2005 21	PAOK	1–1	Olympiacos	Thessaloniki
16:15 EET	Dimitris Salpingidis 47'	Report	21' (pen.) Predrag Dordevic	Stadium: Toumba Stadium; Attendance: 23.950

13 March 2005 22	Ergotelis	0–1	PAOK	Heraklion
15:30 EET	Manager: (Greece) Myron Sifakis	Report	52' Dimitris Salpingidis Manager: (Greece) Nikos Karageorgiou	Stadium: Pankritio Stadium; Attendance: 7.450

20 March 2005 23	PAOK	2–1	Chalkidona	Thessaloniki
15:30 EET	Guy Feutchine 15'; Giorgos Theodoridis 89' Manager: (Greece) Nikos Karageorgiou	Report	22' Christos Iliopoulos Manager: (Greece) Georgios Paraschos	Stadium: Toumba Stadium

2 April 2005 24	PAOK	1–0	Xanthi	Thessaloniki
17:30 EET	Guy Feutchine 62' Manager: (Greece) Nikos Karageorgiou	Report	Manager: (Greece) Giannis Matzourakis	Stadium: Toumba Stadium

10 April 2005 25	AEK Athens	2–0	PAOK	Athens
17:30 EET	Alessandro Soares 37', 58' Manager: (Portugal) Fernando Santos	Report	Manager: (Greece) Nikos Karageorgiou	Stadium: Olympic Stadium; Attendance: 40.094

17 April 2005 26	PAOK	4–1	OFI	Thessaloniki
18:30 EET	Marcin Mieciel 28'; Dimitris Salpingidis 35', 59'; Giorgos Theodoridis 48' Manager: (Greece) Nikos Karageorgiou	Report	5' Metodi Deyanov Manager: (Greece) Giannis Chatzinikolaou	Stadium: Toumba Stadium; Attendance: 3.279

23 April 2005 27	Ionikos	1–1	PAOK	Piraeus
15:00 EET	Marcelo Gutman 70' Manager: (Greece) Vangelis Vlachos	Report	7' Dimitrios Salpingidis Manager: (Greece) Nikos Karageorgiou	Stadium: Neapoli Stadium; Attendance: 1.071

8 May 2005 28	PAOK	1–1	Panathinaikos	Thessaloniki
17:00 EET	Dimitris Salpingidis 25' Manager: (Greece) Nikos Karageorgiou	Report	23' Dimitrios Papadopoulos Manager: (Italy) Alberto Malesani	Stadium: Toumba Stadium; Attendance: 17.845

15 May 2005 29	Apollon Kalamarias	2–1	PAOK	Thessaloniki
16:45 EET	Cleyton 64', 65' Manager: (Serbia and Montenegro) Dragan Kokotovic	Report	6' Marcin Mieciel Manager: (Greece) Nikos Karageorgiou	Stadium: Kalamaria Stadium; Attendance: 1.793

25 May 2005 30	PAOK	2–4	Egaleo	Thessaloniki
16:30 EET	Marcin Mieciel 20'; Dimitris Salpingidis 87' Manager: (Greece) Nikos Karageorgiou	Report	37', 50', 83' Nikos Nikolopoulos; 44' Giorgos Barkoglou Manager: (Romania) Ilie Dumitrescu	Stadium: Toumba Stadium

== Greek Cup ==
=== First round ===
11 September 2004 First leg	PAOK	4–0	Lilas Vasiliko	Thessaloniki
13:00 EEST	Theodoridis 36'; Salpingidis 61'; Spasić 72', 78'	Report		Stadium: Toumba Stadium; Referee: Giorgos Takidis (Kilkis)

22 September 2004 Second leg	Lilas Vasiliko	0–0 (4–0 agg.)	PAOK	Euboea
13:00 EEST		Report		Stadium: Vasiliko Municipal Stadium; Referee: Vasilis Skoufitsas (Athens)

=== Round of 32 ===
22 December 2004 First leg	PAOK	0–0	Egaleo	Thessaloniki
14:45 EET		Report		Stadium: Toumba Stadium; Referee: Iraklis Tsikinis (Messinia)

12 January 2005 Second leg	Egaleo	2–0 (2–0 agg.)	PAOK	Aigaleo
16:00 EET	Makris 76'; Barkoglou 83'	Report		Stadium: Stavros Mavrothalassitis Stadium; Referee: Giorgos Douros (Corinthia)

== UEFA Champions League ==
=== Third qualifying round ===
10 August 2004 1st leg	PAOK (Greece)	0–3; Awarded	(Israel) Maccabi Tel Aviv	Thessaloniki, Greece
20:45 CET	Yiasoumi 50'	Report	12' Addo; 42' Mesika	Stadium: Toumba Stadium; Attendance: 28,000; Referee: (Spain) Arturo Dauden Ibanez
Note: The match finished 2–1 to Maccabi Tel Aviv but was awarded 3–0 against PAOK for fielding a suspended player.

25 August 2004 2nd leg	Maccabi Tel Aviv (Israel)	1–0 (4–0 agg.)	(Greece) PAOK	Tel Aviv, Israel
18:00 CET	L. Cohen 8'	Report		Stadium: Bloomfield Stadium; Attendance: 12,000; Referee: (Slovakia) Lubos Michel

== UEFA Cup ==
=== First round ===
16 September 2004 1st leg	PAOK (Greece)	2–3	(Netherlands) AZ	Thessaloniki, Greece
21:00 CET	Salpingidis 26'; Vokolos 31'	Report	18' Van Galen; 36' Landzaat; 49' Meerdink	Stadium: Toumba Stadium; Attendance: 9,231; Referee: (Hungary) Zsolt Szabo

30 September 2004 2nd leg	AZ (Netherlands)	2–1 (5–3 agg.)	(Greece) PAOK	Alkmaar, Netherlands
20:00 CET	Buskermolen 10'; Mathijsen 72'	Report	8' Salpingidis	Stadium: Alkmaarderhout; Attendance: 7,923; Referee: (Austria) Bernhard Brugger

== Statistics ==
=== Squad statistics ===
As of 25 May 2005

Appearances denote players in the starting lineup, with the numbers in parentheses denoting appearances as substitute.

No.	Name	Alpha Ethniki		Greek Cup^{1}		UEFA Cup		Champions League		Total	
No.	Name	Apps	Goals	Apps	Goals	Apps	Goals	Apps	Goals	Apps	Goals
Goalkeepers
1	(Greece) Ilias Atmatsidis	8 (1)	0	0	0	1	0	2	0	11 (1)	0
33	(Greece) Kyriakos Tohouroglou	20	0	0	0	1	0	0	0	21	0
55	(Portugal) Daniel Fernandes	4 (1)	0	0	0	0	0	0	0	4 (1)	0
Defenders
3	(Greece) Vangelis Koutsopoulos	21 (5)	0	0	0	0	0	0	0	21 (5)	0
4	(Greece) Leonidas Vokolos	11	0	0	0	2	1	1	0	14	1
13	(Greece) Giorgos Zisopoulos	16 (5)	0	0	0	0	0	0	0	16 (5)	0
16	(Greece) Paraskevas Andralas	24 (8)	1	0	0	2	0	0	0	26 (8)	1
23	(Greece) Dionysis Chasiotis	21 (2)	2	0	0	2	0	1	0	24 (2)	2
24	(Nigeria) Ifeanyi Udeze	27	0	0	0	2	0	2	0	31	0
32	(Greece) Christos Karipidis	23 (3)	2	0	0	0	0	0	0	23 (3)	2
77	(Egypt) Amir Azmy	13	0	0	0	0	0	0	0	13	0
Midfielders
5	(Greece) Christos Maladenis	20 (2)	6	0	0	1	0	1	0	22 (2)	6
6	(Greece) Dimitris Markos	5 (2)	0	0	0	1	0	1	0	7 (2)	0
8	(Greece) Dimitris Zavadias	5 (4)	0	0	0	0	0	0	0	5 (4)	0
10	(Greece) Giorgos Theodoridis	11 (2)	2	0	0	2 (1)	0	1	0	14 (3)	2
14	(Greece) Giorgos Koutsis	10 (1)	0	0	0	1	0	2	0	13 (1)	0
18	(Greece) Lambros Vangelis	9 (2)	0	0	0	1	0	1 (1)	0	11 (3)	0
19	(Cyprus) Alexandros Garpozis	1 (1)	0	0	0	0	0	0	0	1 (1)	0
20	(Serbia and Montenegro) Sladan Spasic	18 (3)	3	0	0	1 (1)	0	2 (2)	0	21 (6)	3
21	(Greece) Loukas Karadimos	17 (8)	1	0	0	0	0	2	0	19 (8)	1
22	(Cameroon) Guy Feutchine	24 (2)	6	0	0	1	0	2	0	27 (2)	6
30	(Cyprus) Panagiotis Engomitis	21 (7)	1	0	0	1 (1)	0	2	0	24 (8)	1
31	(Greece) Dimitrios Zografakis	9 (1)	0	0	0	0	0	0	0	9 (1)	0
44	(Ghana) Ebenezer Hagan	4 (2)	0	0	0	2 (1)	0	1	0	7 (3)	0
80	(Cyprus) Liasos Louka	7 (7)	0	0	0	0	0	1 (1)	0	8 (8)	0
Forwards
7	(Greece) Nikos Skarmoutsos	7 (4)	0	0	0	2 (1)	0	2 (1)	0	11 (6)	0
9	(Greece) Dimitris Salpingidis	29	14	0	0	2	2	2	0	33	16
11	(Cyprus) Yiasoumis Yiasoumi	19 (13)	0	0	0	2	0	1	1	22 (13)	1
25	(Nigeria) Thankgod Amaefule	0	0	0	0	0	0	1 (1)	0	1 (1)	0
29	(Greece) Lazaros Christodoulopoulos	1	0	0	0	0	0	0	0	1	0
98	(Poland) Marcin Mieciel	13 (2)	5	0	0	0	0	0	0	13 (2)	5

^{1} Missing stats for Cup. PAOK played four games in competition. Please Help.

=== Goalscorers ===
Rank	No.	Pos.	Player	Alpha Ethniki	Greek Cup^{1}	UEFA Cup	Champions League	Total
1	9	FW	(Greece) Dimitris Salpingidis	14	0	2	0	16
2	22	MF	(Cameroon) Guy Feutchine	6	0	0	0	6
3	5	MF	(Greece) Christos Maladenis	6	0	0	0	6
4	98	FW	(Poland) Marcin Mieciel	5	0	0	0	5
5	20	MF	(Serbia and Montenegro) Sladan Spasic	3	0	0	0	3
6	10	MF	(Greece) Giorgos Theodoridis	2	0	0	0	2
7	23	DF	(Greece) Dionysis Chasiotis	2	0	0	0	2
8	32	DF	(Greece) Christos Karipidis	2	0	0	0	2
9	21	MF	(Greece) Loukas Karadimos	1	0	0	0	1
10	30	MF	(Cyprus) Panagiotis Engomitis	1	0	0	0	1
11	16	DF	(Greece) Paraskevas Andralas	1	0	0	0	1
12	11	FW	(Cyprus) Yiasoumis Yiasoumi	0	0	0	1	1
13	4	DF	(Greece) Leonidas Vokolos	0	0	1	0	1
Own goals				0	0	0	0	0
TOTALS				43	0	3	1	47
