= 2002–03 PAOK FC season =

PAOK
2002–03 season
- Chairman: Petros Kalafatis
- Manager: Angelos Anastasiadis
- Stadium: Toumba Stadium
- Alpha Ethniki: 4th
- Greek Cup: Winners
- UEFA Cup: Third round
- Top goalscorer: League: Georgios Georgiadis (14); All: Georgios Georgiadis (18)
Home colours	Away colours

The 2002–03 season was PAOK Football Club's 77th in existence and the club's 44th consecutive season in the top flight of Greek football. The team will enter the Greek Football Cup in the First round and will also enter in UEFA Cup starting from the First round.

== Players ==
=== Squad ===
Note: Flags indicate national team as defined under FIFA eligibility rules; some limited exceptions apply. Players may hold more than one non-FIFA nationality.

No.	Pos.	Nation	Player
1	MF	GRE	Pantelis Kafes (captain)
3	DF	GRE	Vangelis Koutsopoulos
4	MF	GRE	Ryan Kapagiannidis
5	MF	GRE	Dimitris Markos
6	MF	GRE	Dimitris Zavadias
7	FW	CYP	Stefanos Voskaridis
8	FW	GRE	Dimitris Salpingidis
9	FW	CYP	Ioannis Okkas
10	FW	GRE	Nikolaos Frousos
11	FW	GRE	Georgios Georgiadis
13	DF	ITA	Francesco Scardina
14	MF	GRE	Giorgos Koutsis
15	GK	GRE	Vangelis Pourliotopoulos
16	DF	GRE	Fotis Kiskabanis
17	MF	GRE	Giorgos Theodoridis
18	FW	CYP	Yiasoumis Yiasoumi
19	DF	GHA	Koffi Amponsah
20	MF	SCG	Sladan Spasic

No.	Pos.	Nation	Player
21	DF	POL	Marek Koźmiński
22	MF	CMR	Guy Feutchine
23	DF	GRE	Dionysis Chasiotis
24	DF	NGR	Ifeanyi Udeze
26	MF	FRA	Aboubacar Fofana
30	MF	CYP	Panagiotis Engomitis
31	GK	GRE	Ilias Atmatsidis
33	GK	GRE	Kyriakos Tohouroglou
37	DF	GRE	Petros Konteon
38	DF	GRE	Petros Kanakoudis
39	MF	GRE	Ilias Eleftheriadis
41	MF	GRE	Georgios Makris
44	MF	GRE	Loukas Karadimos
72	GK	POL	Radosław Majdan
77	MF	POL	Mariusz Kukiełka
80	DF	GRE	Vangelis Nastos
99	GK	SVK	Kamil Susko

== Transfers ==
Players transferred in

Transfer Window	Pos.	Name	Club	Fee
Summer	MF	(Greece) Dimitris Markos	(Greece) Aris	Free
Summer	GK	(Poland) Radosław Majdan	(Turkey) Göztepe	Free
Summer	MF	(France) Sakis Dione	(Greece) Panathinaikos	On loan
Summer	MF	(Germany) Georgios Theodoridis	(Greece) Aris	Free
Summer	MF	(Poland) Mariusz Kukiełka	(Poland) Amica Wronki	Free
Summer	MF	(Poland) Marek Koźmiński	(Italy) Ancona	Free
Summer	DF	(Italy) Francesco Scardina	(Italy) Juventus	Loan
Summer	MF	(France) Aboubacar Fofana	(Italy) Juventus	Loan
Summer	GK	(Slovakia) Kamil Susko	(Czech Republic) Baník Ostrava	Free
Summer	MF	(Greece) Ilias Eleftheriadis	(Greece) PAOK U20	
Summer	DF	(Greece) Petros Konteon	(Greece) PAOK U20	
Summer	DF	(Greece) Fotis Kiskabanis	(Greece) Olympiacos Volos	End of loan
Summer	DF	(Greece) Christos Karypidis	(Greece) Kavala	End of loan
Summer	FW	(Greece) Dimitris Salpingidis	(Greece) Kavala	End of loan
Winter	GK	(Greece) Ilias Atmatsidis	(Greece) AEK Athens	Free
Winter	MF	(Greece) Ryan Kapagiannidis	(Greece) AS Kassandra	Free
Winter	MF	(Greece) Georgios Makris	(Greece) PAOK U20	

Players transferred out

Transfer Window	Pos.	Name	Club	Fee
Summer	DF	(Greece) Georgios Koulakiotis	(Greece) Kallithea	Free
Summer	DF	(Greece) Anastasios Katsabis	(Greece) Iraklis	Free
Summer	DF	(Greece) Georgios Chatzizisis	(Greece) Apollon Kalamarias	Free
Summer	DF	(Greece) Vasilios Borbokis	(Greece) AEK Athens	Free
Summer	DF	(Greece) Christos Karipidis	(Greece) Kerkyra	Loan
Summer	DF	(Greece) P. Konstantinidis	(Greece) Panathinaikos	Free
Summer	MF	(Brazil) Luciano de Souza	(Cyprus) AEL Limassol	Free
Winter	DF	(Nigeria) Ifeanyi Udeze	(England) West Brom	Loan
Winter	GK	(Poland) Radosław Majdan	(Turkey) Bursaspor	Free
Winter	DF	(Poland) Marek Koźmiński	(Poland) Górnik Zabrze	Free
Winter	DF	(Italy) Francesco Scardina	(Italy) Juventus	End of loan

== Competitions ==
=== Overview ===
Competition	Record							
Competition	Pld	W	D	L	GF	GA	GD	Win %
Alpha Ethniki	30	16	5	9	59	38	+21	53.33
Greek Cup	11	6	5	0	12	4	+8	54.55
UEFA Cup	6	3	1	2	9	9	+0	50.00
Total	47	25	11	11	80	51	+29	53.19

Source: Competitions

=== Alpha Ethniki ===
==== League table ====
Pos	Team	Pld	W	D	L	GF	GA	GD	Pts	Qualification or relegation
2	Panathinaikos	30	22	4	4	50	19	+31	70 (Note: Head-to-head points (goal difference): Olympiacos 3 (+2), Panathinaikos 3 (-2).)	Qualification for Champions League group stage
3	AEK Athens	30	21	5	4	74	29	+45	68	Qualification for Champions League third qualifying round
4	PAOK	30	16	5	9	59	38	+21	53 (Note: Head-to-head points (goal difference): PAOK 3 (+1), Panionios 3 (-1).)	Qualification for UEFA Cup first round
5	Panionios	30	15	8	7	35	25	+10	53	Qualification for UEFA Cup first round
6	Aris	30	15	6	9	37	34	+3	51	Qualification for UEFA Cup first round

Source: Galanis Sports Data
Rules for classification: 1) Points; 2) Head-to-head points; 3) Head-to-head goal difference; 4) Goal difference; 5) Goals scored; 6) Goals against; 7) Play-offs (neutral ground); 8) Draw.
(Note: Criterion 7 is only used if needed to decide champion, teams for relegation or teams for UEFA competitions).

===== Results summary =====
Overall								Home						Away					
Pld	W	D	L	GF	GA	GD	Pts	W	D	L	GF	GA	GD	W	D	L	GF	GA	GD
30	16	5	9	59	38	+21	53	10	2	3	32	9	+23	6	3	6	27	29	−2

Last updated: 25 May 2003.
Source: Competitive matches

===== Results by round =====
Round	1	2	3	4	5	6	7	8	9	10	11	12	13	14	15	16	17	18	19	20	21	22	23	24	25	26	27	28	29	30
Ground	H	A	H	A	H	A	A	H	A	H	A	H	A	H	H	A	H	A	H	A	H	H	A	H	A	H	A	H	A	A
Result	W	D	L	W	D	W	D	W	W	W	L	W	L	W	W	L	W	W	W	L	D	L	W	L	L	W	D	W	W	L
Position	1	5	9	7	8	5	6	2	1	1	2	2	3	3	3	3	3	3	3	3	4	5	5	5	5	5	5	4	4	4

Source: League matches
A = Away; H = Home; W = Win; D = Draw; L = Loss

===== Matches =====
Win Draw Loss

25 August 2002 1	PAOK	4–1	Panathinaikos	Thessaloniki
EET	Georgios Georgiadis 9', 23' (pen.); Sladan Spasic 41'; René Henriksen 58' (o.g.)		33' (o.g.) Yiasoumis Yiasoumi	Stadium: Toumba Stadium

1 September 2002 2	Xanthi	1–1	PAOK	Xanthi
EET	Ismail Ba 38'		90' (pen.) Georgios Georgiadis	Stadium: Xanthi Ground

14 September 2002 3	PAOK	2–3	Kallithea	Thessaloniki
18:30 EET	Georgios Georgiadis 45' (pen.), 90'		16', 89' Theofanis Gekas; 66' Giannis Tatsis	Stadium: Toumba Stadium

22 September 2002 4	OFI	2–3	PAOK	Heraklion
20:00 EET	Mauricio Solís 83'; Rónald Gómez 88'		7' Pantelis Kafes; 36' Ioannis Okkas; 47' Dimitris Salpingidis	Stadium: Theodoros Vardinogiannis Stadium

26 October 2002 5	PAOK	1–1	Olympiacos	Thessaloniki
18:00 EET	Georgiadis 56' (pen.)		40' (pen.) Predrag Djordjevic	Stadium: Toumba Stadium

3 November 2002 6	Akratitos	1–3	PAOK	Athens
20:00 EET	Tomas Ražanauskas 4'		50' Ioannis Okkas; 57' Vaggelis Nastos; 72' Yiasoumis Yiasoumi	Stadium: Yiannis Pathiakakis Stadium

10 November 2002 7	Iraklis	1–1	PAOK	Thessaloniki
20:00 EET	Marcin Mieciel 37'		82' Nikolaos Frousos	Stadium: Makedonikos Stadium

24 November 2002 8	PAOK	4–1	Proodeftiki	Thessaloniki
16:00 EET	Georgios Georgiadis 39' (pen.); Yiasoumis Yiasoumi 51', 68'; Vangelis Moras 81' (o.g.)		90' (pen.) Konstantinos Mangos	Stadium: Toumba Stadium

1 December 2002 9	AEK Athens	3–4	PAOK	Athens
20:00 EET	Kostas Katsouranis 35'; Demis Nikolaidis 45' (pen.); Vassilios Borbokis 77'		2' Nikolaos Frousos; 18', 59' Ioannis Okkas; 28' Vaggelis Nastos	Stadium: Nikos Goumas Stadium

8 December 2002 10	PAOK	3–0	Ionikos	Thessaloniki
16:00 EET	Ioannis Okkas 5'; Nikolaos Frousos 55'; Yiasoumis Yiasoumi 90'			Stadium: Toumba Stadium

15 December 2002 11	Aris	2–0	PAOK	Thessaloniki
20:00 EET	Njogu Demba-Nyrén 85', 90+1'			Stadium: Kleanthis Vikelidis Stadium

22 December 2002 12	PAOK	4–0	Panachaiki	Thessaloniki
18:00 EET	Nikolaos Frousos 11' (pen.), 86'; Ioannis Okkas 34', 63'			Stadium: Toumba Stadium

4 January 2003 13	Panionios	2–0	PAOK	Nea Smyrni, Athens
18:00 EET	Ermin Šiljak 46'; Erol Bulut 66'			Stadium: Nea Smyrni Stadium

12 January 2003 14	PAOK	4–0	Egaleo	Thessaloniki
17:45 EET	Georgios Georgiadis 66', 83' (pen.); Dimitris Salpingidis 69'; Ioannis Okkas 90'			Stadium: Toumba Stadium

18 January 2003 15	PAOK	1–0	PAS Giannina	Kavala
18:00 EET	Georgios Georgiadis 22'			Stadium: Kavala Stadium

26 January 2003 16	Panathinaikos	1–0	PAOK	Athens
20:00 EET	Nikos Liberopoulos 52'			Stadium: Leoforos Alexandras Stadium

1 February 2003 17	PAOK	1–0	Xanthi	Thessaloniki
20:00 EET	Georgios Georgiadis 10'			Stadium: Toumba Stadium

9 February 2003 18	Kallithea	1–2	PAOK	Athens
18:00 EET	Theofanis Gekas 11'		22' Pantelis Kafes; 23' Ioannis Okkas	Stadium: Grigoris Lambrakis Stadium

16 February 2003 19	PAOK	2–0	OFI	Thessaloniki
16:00 EET	Giorgos Koutsis 2'; Sladan Spasic 90'			Stadium: Toumba Stadium

23 February 2003 20	Olympiacos	4–3	PAOK	Athens
20:00 EET	Zé Elias 4'; Predrag Djordjevic 17'; Giovanni 50'; Lampros Choutos 51'		27', 58', 63' Pantelis Kafes	Stadium: Georgios Kamaras Stadium

2 March 2003 21	PAOK	1–1	Akratitos	Thessaloniki
16:00 EET	Nikolaos Frousos 71'		78' Nikos Iordanidis	Stadium: Toumba Stadium

9 March 2003 22	PAOK	0–1	Iraklis	Thessaloniki
20:00 EET	Georgios Georgiadis (penalty missed) 8'		8' Ederson Fofonka	Stadium: Toumba Stadium

16 March 2003 23	Proodeftiki	0–3	PAOK	Piraeus
16:00 EET			53' Pantelis Kafes; 67' Ioannis Okkas; 90' Dimitris Salpingidis	Stadium: Nikaia Municipal Gymnasium

22 March 2003 24	PAOK	0–1	AEK Athens	Thessaloniki
19:00 EET			90' Dimitris Nalitzis	Stadium: Toumba Stadium

5 April 2003 25	Ionikos	4–0	PAOK	Piraeus
18:45 EET	Oliver Makor 28', 58'; Giannis Xanthopoulos 56', 62'		(penalty missed) 80' Georgios Georgiadis	Stadium: Neapoli Stadium

13 April 2003 26	PAOK	2–0	Aris	Trikala
18:45 EET	Yiasoumis Yiasoumi 50'; Giorgos Theodoridis 69'			Stadium: Trikala Municipal Stadium

20 April 2003 27	Panachaiki	2–2	PAOK	Patra
16:30 EET	Nikos Skarmoutsos 59'; Igor Budiša 90'		52' Giorgos Koutsis; 75' Ioannis Okkas	Stadium: Kostas Davourlis Stadium

3 May 2003 28	PAOK	3–0	Panionios	Kozani
18:00 EET	Yiasoumis Yiasoumi 35'; Georgios Georgiadis 88', 90'			Stadium: Kozani Stadium

11 May 2003 29	Egaleo	2–3	PAOK	Athens
18:15 EET	Georgios Fotakis 49'; Lefteris Velentzas 57'		25', 80' Pantelis Kafes; 55' Yiasoumis Yiasoumi	Stadium: Stavros Mavrothalassitis Stadium

25 May 2003 30	PAS Giannina	3–2	PAOK	Ioannina
19:30 EET	Samir Duro 28'; Vasilios Bletsas 86'; Gilles Domoraud 87'		17' Georgios Georgiadis; 43' Giorgos Theodoridis	Stadium: Zosimades Stadium

=== Greek Cup ===
==== First round ====
12 August 2002 1st leg	Leonidio	0–1	PAOK	Leonidio
		Report	Kafes 39'	Stadium: Municipal Stadium of Leonidio; Referee: Tsikinis (Messenia)

4 September 2002 2nd leg	PAOK	0–0 (1–0 agg.)	Leonidio	Thessaloniki
		Report		Stadium: Toumba Stadium; Attendance: 591; Referee: Damianos (Kozani)

==== Second round ====
23 October 2002 1st leg	PAOK	2–0	Olympiacos Volos	Thessaloniki
	Salpingidis 53'; Frousos 85'	Report		Stadium: Toumba Stadium; Referee: Kontogiannidis (Xanthi)

6 November 2002 2nd leg	Olympiacos Volos	0–0 (0–2 agg.)	PAOK	Volos
		Report		Stadium: Volos Municipal Stadium; Referee: Takidis (Kilkis)

==== Third round ====
19 December 2002 1st leg	PAOK	0–0	OFI	Thessaloniki
17:00 EET		Report		Stadium: Toumba Stadium; Referee: Kaznaferis (Athens)

8 January 2003 2nd leg	OFI	1–1 (1–1 (a) agg.)	PAOK	Heraklion
17:00 EET	Soares 23'	Report	Salpingidis 61'	Stadium: Theodoros Vardinogiannis Stadium; Referee: Douros (Corinthia)

==== Quarter-finals ====
26 February 2003 1st leg	PAOK	3–1	Olympiacos	Thessaloniki
19:00 EET	Georgiadis 10'; Markos 31'; Okkas 86'	Report	Giannakopoulos 44' (pen.)	Stadium: Toumba Stadium; Attendance: 17,647; Referee: Tsagarakis (Chania)

12 March 2003 2nd leg	Olympiacos	1–2 (2–5 agg.)	PAOK	Athens
19:00 EET	Choutos 76'	Report	Georgiadis 30'; Okkas 32'	Stadium: Georgios Kamaras Stadium; Attendance: 11,466; Referee: Douros (Corinthia)

==== Semi-finals ====
23 April 2003 1st leg	AEK Athens	0–1	PAOK	Athens
19:45 EEST		Report	Yiasoumi 40'	Stadium: Nikos Goumas Stadium; Attendance: 10,082; Referee: Borovilos (Arcadia)

7 May 2003 2nd leg	PAOK	1–1 (2–1 agg.)	AEK Athens	Thessaloniki
20:00 EEST	Okkas 88'	Report	Maladenis 8'	Stadium: Toumba Stadium; Attendance: 8,363; Referee: Briakos (Epirus)

==== Final ====
17 May 2003	PAOK	1–0	Aris	Thessaloniki
21:15 EEST	Georgiadis 24'; Koutsopoulos (yellow card) 33'; Yiasoumi (yellow card) 56'	Report	Koltsidas (yellow card) 20'; Papadopoulos (yellow card) 44'	Stadium: Toumba Stadium; Attendance: 18,703; Referee: Douros (Corinthia); Man of the Match: Georgiadis

=== UEFA Cup ===
==== First round ====
17 September 2002 1st leg	Leixões (Portugal)	2–1	(Greece) PAOK	Matosinhos, Portugal
18:00 CET	Carlos Brito 4'; Detinho 52'	Report	25' Mariusz Kukiełka	Stadium: Estádio do Mar; Referee: (Slovenia) Darko Čeferin

3 October 2002 2nd leg	PAOK (Greece)	4–1 (5–3 agg.)	(Portugal) Leixões	Thessaloniki, Greece
18:00 CET	Salpingidis 14'; Okkas 16', 80'; Koutsopoulos 56'	Report	81' Pedras	Stadium: Toumba Stadium; Referee: (Germany) Edgar Steinborn

==== Second round ====
31 October 2002 1st leg	PAOK (Greece)	2–1	(Switzerland) Grasshoppers	Thessaloniki, Greece
20:00 CET	Chasiotis 3'; Yiasoumi 48'	Report	64' (pen.) Núñez	Stadium: Toumba Stadium; Referee: (Belgium) Luc Huyghe

14 November 2002 2nd leg	Grasshoppers (Switzerland)	1–1 (2–3 agg.)	(Greece) PAOK	Zürich, Switzerland
20:15 CET	Cabanas 45+2'	Report	90+3' Markos	Stadium: Hardturm; Referee: (Sweden) Martin Hansson

==== Third round ====
28 November 2002 1st leg	PAOK (Greece)	1–0	(Czech Republic) Slavia Prague	Thessaloniki, Greece
20:00 CET	Georgiadis 51'	Report		Stadium: Toumba Stadium; Referee: (France) Alain Sars

12 December 2002 2nd leg	Slavia Prague (Czech Republic)	4–0 (4–1 agg.)	(Greece) PAOK	Prague, Czech Republic
20:30 CET	Skácel 13'; Vachoušek 51'; Kuka 89', 90+3'	Report		Stadium: Stadion Evžena Rošického; Referee: (Spain) Antonio López Nieto

== Statistics ==
=== Squad statistics ===
As of 25 May 2003

Appearances denote players in the starting lineup, with the numbers in parentheses denoting appearances as substitute.

No.	Name	Alpha Ethniki		Greek Cup		UEFA Cup		Total	
No.	Name	Apps	Goals	Apps	Goals	Apps	Goals	Apps	Goals
Goalkeepers
15	(Greece) Vangelis Pourliotopoulos	1	0	2	0	2	0	5	0
31	(Greece) Ilias Atmatsidis	5 (1)	0	3	0	0	0	8 (1)	0
33	(Greece) Kyriakos Tohouroglou	22	0	5	0	5 (1)	0	32 (1)	0
72	(Poland) Radosław Majdan	4 (1)	0	1	0	0	0	5 (1)	0
Defenders
3	(Greece) Vangelis Koutsopoulos	21 (5)	0	11 (3)	0	5 (1)	1	37 (9)	1
13	(Italy) Francesco Scardina	0	0	2	0	0	0	2	0
16	(Greece) Fotis Kiskabanis	1 (1)	0	0	0	0	0	1 (1)	0
19	(Ghana) Koffi Amponsah	21	0	6	0	5 (1)	0	32 (1)	0
21	(Poland) Marek Koźmiński	9 (5)	0	3	0	1	0	13 (5)	0
23	(Greece) Dionysis Chasiotis	26	0	10 (3)	0	5 (1)	1	41 (4)	1
24	(Nigeria) Ifeanyi Udeze	3 (1)	0	1	0	4	0	8 (1)	0
37	(Greece) Petros Konteon	1 (1)	0	0	0	0	0	1 (1)	0
38	(Greece) Petros Kanakoudis	1 (1)	0	0	0	0	0	1 (1)	0
80	(Greece) Vaggelis Nastos	19 (10)	2	9 (3)	0	4 (2)	0	32 (15)	2
Midfielders
1	(Greece) Pantelis Kafes	25	8	8	1	5	0	38	9
4	(Greece) Ryan Kapagiannidis	3 (2)	0	1 (1)	0	0	0	4 (3)	0
5	(Greece) Dimitris Markos	26 (2)	0	10 (2)	1	5	1	41 (4)	2
6	(Greece) Dimitris Zavadias	2 (2)	0	3	0	0	0	5 (2)	0
13	(Greece) Giorgos Theodoridis	6 (5)	2	0	0	0	0	6 (5)	2
14	(Greece) Giorgos Koutsis	25 (7)	2	9 (1)	0	4 (1)	0	38 (9)	2
20	(Serbia and Montenegro) Sladan Spasic	10 (1)	2	7 (4)	0	1 (1)	0	18 (6)	2
22	(Cameroon) Guy Feutchine	15 (5)	0	6 (4)	0	4	0	25 (9)	0
26	(France) Aboubacar Fofana	3 (3)	0	2 (1)	0	0	0	5 (4)	0
30	(Cyprus) Panagiotis Engomitis	17 (5)	0	7 (4)	0	0	0	24 (9)	0
39	(Greece) Ilias Eleftheriadis	0	0	1 (1)	0	0	0	1 (1)	0
41	(Greece) Georgios Makris	1 (1)	0	0	0	0	0	1 (1)	0
44	(Greece) Loukas Karadimos	14 (1)	0	6 (1)	0	1 (1)	0	21 (3)	0
77	(Poland) Mariusz Kukiełka	26	0	7 (1)	0	6	1	39 (1)	1
Forwards
7	(Cyprus) Stefanos Voskaridis	4 (4)	0	3 (1)	0	0	0	7 (5)	0
8	(Greece) Dimitris Salpingidis	15 (6)	3	4 (1)	2	4 (3)	1	23 (10)	6
9	(Cyprus) Ioannis Okkas	29 (2)	11	8	3	6	2	43 (2)	16
10	(Greece) Nikolaos Frousos	15 (8)	6	4 (2)	1	5 (4)	0	24 (14)	7
11	(Greece) Georgios Georgiadis	28	14	9	3	6	1	43	18
18	(Cyprus) Yiasoumis Yiasoumi	22 (10)	7	6	1	6 (2)	1	34 (12)	9

Source: Match reports in competitive matches, uefa.com, epo.gr, RSSSF

=== Goalscorers ===
Rank	No.	Pos.	Player	Alpha Ethniki	Greek Cup	UEFA Cup	Total
1	11	FW	(Greece) Georgios Georgiadis	14	3	1	18
2	9	FW	(Cyprus) Ioannis Okkas	11	3	2	16
3	1	MF	(Greece) Pantelis Kafes	8	1	0	9
4	18	FW	(Cyprus) Yiasoumis Yiasoumi	7	1	1	9
5	10	FW	(Greece) Nikolaos Frousos	6	1	0	7
6	8	FW	(Greece) Dimitris Salpingidis	3	2	1	6
7	20	MF	(Serbia and Montenegro) Sladan Spasic	2	0	0	2
8	14	MF	(Greece) Giorgos Koutsis	2	0	0	2
9	13	MF	(Greece) Giorgos Theodoridis	2	0	0	2
10	80	DF	(Greece) Vaggelis Nastos	2	0	0	2
11	5	MF	(Greece) Dimitris Markos	0	1	1	2
12	23	DF	(Greece) Dionysis Chasiotis	0	0	1	1
13	77	MF	(Poland) Mariusz Kukiełka	0	0	1	1
14	3	DF	(Greece) V. Koutsopoulos	0	0	1	1
Own goals				2	0	0	2
TOTALS				59	12	9	80

Source: Match reports in competitive matches, uefa.com, epo.gr, RSSSF
