= Amaefule =

Amaefule is a surname. Notable people with the surname include:

- Napoleon Amaefule (born 1980), Nigerian footballer
- Thankgod Amaefule (born 1984), Nigerian footballer
