= Dimitris Salpingidis =

Greek footballer

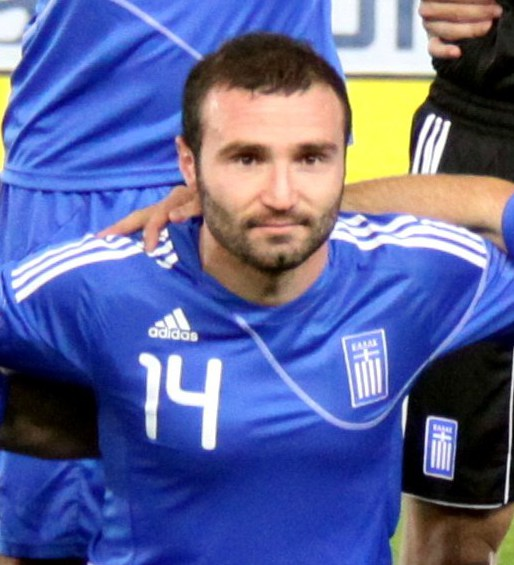
- Salpingidis with Greece in 2010

Personal information
- Full name: Dimitrios Salpingidis
- Date of birth: 18 August 1981 (age 45)
- Place of birth: Zagliveri, Greece
- Height: 1.72 m (5 ft 8 in)
- Position: Forward

Youth career
- 1995–1999: PAOK

Senior career*
Years	Team	Apps	(Gls)
1999–2006	PAOK	103	(50)
1999–2000	→ AEL (loan)	7	(0)
2000–2002	→ Kavala (loan)	43	(25)
2006–2010	Panathinaikos	119	(46)
2010–2015	PAOK	159	(40)
Total		431	(161)

International career
2004–2005	Greece U23	3	(0)
2005–2014	Greece	82	(13)
- * Club domestic league appearances and goals

Dimitris Salpingidis (Greek: Δημήτρης Σαλπιγγίδης pronounced [ðiˈmitris salpiɲˈɟiðis]; born 18 August 1981) is a Greek former professional footballer who played as a forward. He was known to be "a very quick and useful tool on the counter attack."

== Club career ==
=== PAOK ===
Born in Zagliveri, Salpingidis started out as a Greco-Roman wrestler before discovering his calling in football. Salpingidis began his football career through the youth ranks of PAOK. Before football Salpingidis was participating in wrestling in which he was very good at, with a dream of competing in the Olympics. He didn't make it as a wrestler but his dream came true as footballer in 2004. On 30 September 1999 he marked his official debut against Lokomotivi Tbilisi with a goal in a 2–0 win. Acknowledging his potential and in order to gain much needed experience, the team soon loaned him for two successive seasons to Kavala where he finished top scorer of the Second Division. His plea for a return to PAOK was granted by his mentor, Angelos Anastasiadis and he became an integral part of the team. On 25 August 2002 he made his league debut for PAOK in a 4–1 win against Panathinaikos. He scored his first league goal in 2–3 away win against OFI.

Despite playing out of position as a right midfielder he managed to earn a place in the starting line-up, just a few months after returning from loan. Plagued with financial problems, the next season saw the club experiencing an exodus of its top players such as striker Ioannis Okkas and ex-Newcastle United forward Giorgos Georgiadis, Salpingidis, at the age of 21, then became first-choice striker and captain of the team. The 2003–04 season proved to be the best in many years, as the club finished an unexpected 3rd, qualifying for the Champions league, despite running on a very low budget. His significance for PAOK was such that in the summer 2004 he was given permission to miss a match with the Greek Olympic team so that he could participate in the UEFA Champions League qualifiers against Maccabi Tel Aviv. The elimination at the hands of the Israeli team, followed by the sack of coach Anastasiadis and subsequent financial turmoil hit the team badly, resulting in his exodus less than 2 years later. In the 2005–06 season he was top-scorer in the league with 17 goals.

=== Panathinaikos ===
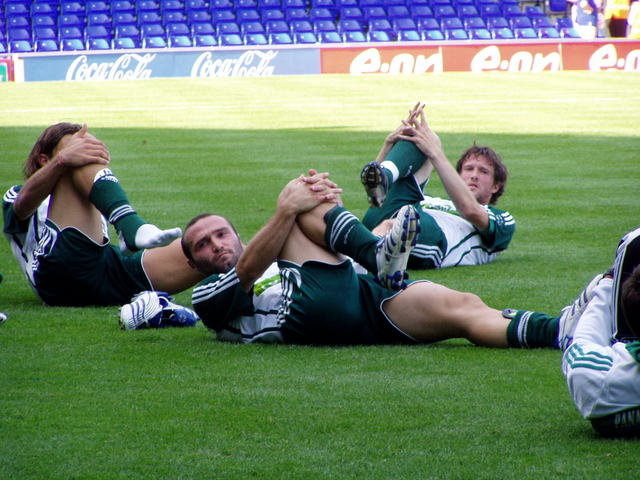
Dimitris Salpingidis before the match with Ipswich Town

In the summer of 2006, as the club's president Giannis Goumenos was desperate to cash in, he was openly chased by Olympiacos, AEK Athens and Panathinaikos. Salpingidis publicly refused the offer of bitter rivals Olympiacos, despite being the most profiting one among the three. On 16 August, after a lengthy negotiation period, he finally agreed to sign a four-year contract to Panathinaikos. He transferred for a fee of €1.8 million, with PAOK additionally receiving Sandor Torghelle, Kostas Chalarambidis and Athanasios Tsigas as an exchange. This was the third most expensive transfer between Greek teams at that time, estimated at €5 million. This transfer caused heavy turmoil amid PAOK fans, branding Salpingidis a traitor and ungrateful to the pains they had taken to keep him in the club. This tense situation brought about the demise of Goumenos' troubled presidency soon after. His debut with the greens was on 20 August 2006 in an away win with 4–1 against Egaleo where he scored three goals.

In the 2009–10 season, Salpingidis was a key player during the victorious march to the Greek championship.

=== Return to PAOK ===
After four very successful seasons with Panathinaikos (including a double-winning 2009–2010 season), in the summer of 2010 Salpingidis joined PAOK once again. On 16 June 2010, it was officially announced that he signed a four-year contract with PAOK, after his contract with Panathinaikos had expired. This club means everything for him as he explained : "I first played for the club in the 1990s and I feel very good there. My whole family and my childhood friends live in the town and I'm playing football for a team with big ambitions. PAOK are one of a select group of clubs with the most fanatical supporters in Europe. Throughout the whole of the north of Greece, people live for the team alone and nothing else."

On 9 January 2011, he scored his 100th goal in the Greek Super League against Asteras Tripolis with a header. On 3 November 2011, Salpingidis became the Greek player with the most goals in Europe. On 30 November he scored a header, beating Heurelho Gomes, in a 2–1 win against Tottenham Hotspur at White Hart Lane, after a cross from Giorgios Georgiadis, in the Europa League.

In the start of the 2012–13 season he changed his squad number from 9 to his favourite 14. In July 2012, Fortuna Düsseldorf are in the process of trying to sign Dimitris Salpingidis from PAOK. The newly promoted Bundesliga side's general manager, Werner Wolf, claimed last week that there would be no more new arrivals at the Esprit Arena before the start of the 2012–13 campaign. However, Goal.com has learned that Fortuna are currently trying to agree a fee with PAOK for Salpingidis, who was one of the stars of Greece's surprise run to the quarter-finals of Euro 2012. The versatile attacker is on a net salary of €800,000 with his hometown club and Fortuna are not in a position to match those terms. However, they are prepared to make Salpingidis one of their highest earners and it is believed that the player is willing to take a pay cut in order to at last try his luck in the Bundesliga, having been often linked with a move to Germany in recent seasons.

In late February and early March 2013 he was in superb form scoring 6 goals in 4 matches. On 17 March 2013 he put pen to paper on a 4-year deal to stay at the club until 2017, hoping to finish his career with his beloved team. He scored two scissor kicks on 23 February 2013 against Kerkyra in a 3–1 home win. On 20 March 2013 he assumed the team captaincy after Pablo Garcia left the club. For the first time in his career, he received a red card in an away match against Platanias in which PAOK won 1–2. On 17 April 2013 he went on to score the winning goal in a thrilling 2–1 victory over Asteras Tripoli in the first leg of the Greek Cup semi-finals.

On 12 December 2013, Salpingidis took the field in PAOK FC's final Group L game, at home to AZ Alkmaar on Thursday, making his 67th appearance in the UEFA Cup and UEFA Europa League. Not a particularly attractive number, but one that carries a certain significance for the 32-year-old forward since it will move him up to fourth place in the competition's all-time appearances list. Two more in the round of 32 would take him level with FC Internazionale Milano's two-time UEFA Cup-winning goalkeeper Walter Zenga in third. Moreover, a third group stage goal this season would lift him to seventh in the overall scorers rankings on 24 goals, alongside Mladen Petrić and Claudio Pizarro. The tournament has played a significant role in Salpingidis's career; his maiden goal for PAOK came on his first-team debut when he was introduced as a substitute for Zisis Vryzas – now PAOK's president – in a UEFA Cup game against FC Lokomotivi Tbilisi on 30 September 1999. Meanwhile, his 100th goal for the 'Two-Headed Eagle Of The North' arrived in PAOK's first meeting with AZ of the current campaign. Oddly enough, both landmark goals were scored under Dutch coaches: Arie Haan in 1999 and Huub Stevens in 2013.

On 26 April 2014, Salpingidis unsuccessfully tried to win his second trophy with PAOK in the Greek Cup final against Panathinaikos. PAOK settled, though, and with half-time their forward forays began to carry real menace. Salpingidis had twice gone close to an equaliser, rattling the bar with a header, and, right before the interval, was millimetres away from turning in Miroslav Stoch's cross with the goal at his mercy. Eventually his club defeated by 1–4.

The 2014–15 season did not start well for the Greek international. Salpingidis had an additional year contract with the club, but there are a few problems appeared in the season and it seems that the final discussion will take place at the end of it. On 29 May 2015, just before the Super League play-offs, the international striker made a special program due to the discomfort in his operated toe, but could not be ready to help his club in the remaining games. Salpingidis is added to the list of players who missed this season, having to play since mid-March. The 34-year-old striker was not in his best physical condition, but Giorgos Georgiadis, coach of PAOK hoped that he could be able to give some solutions, mainly because of his experience. Salpingidis will be ready to help his teammates from the beginning of next season.

On 24 August 2015, the 34-year-old Salpingidis contract at PAOK was terminated.

== International career ==
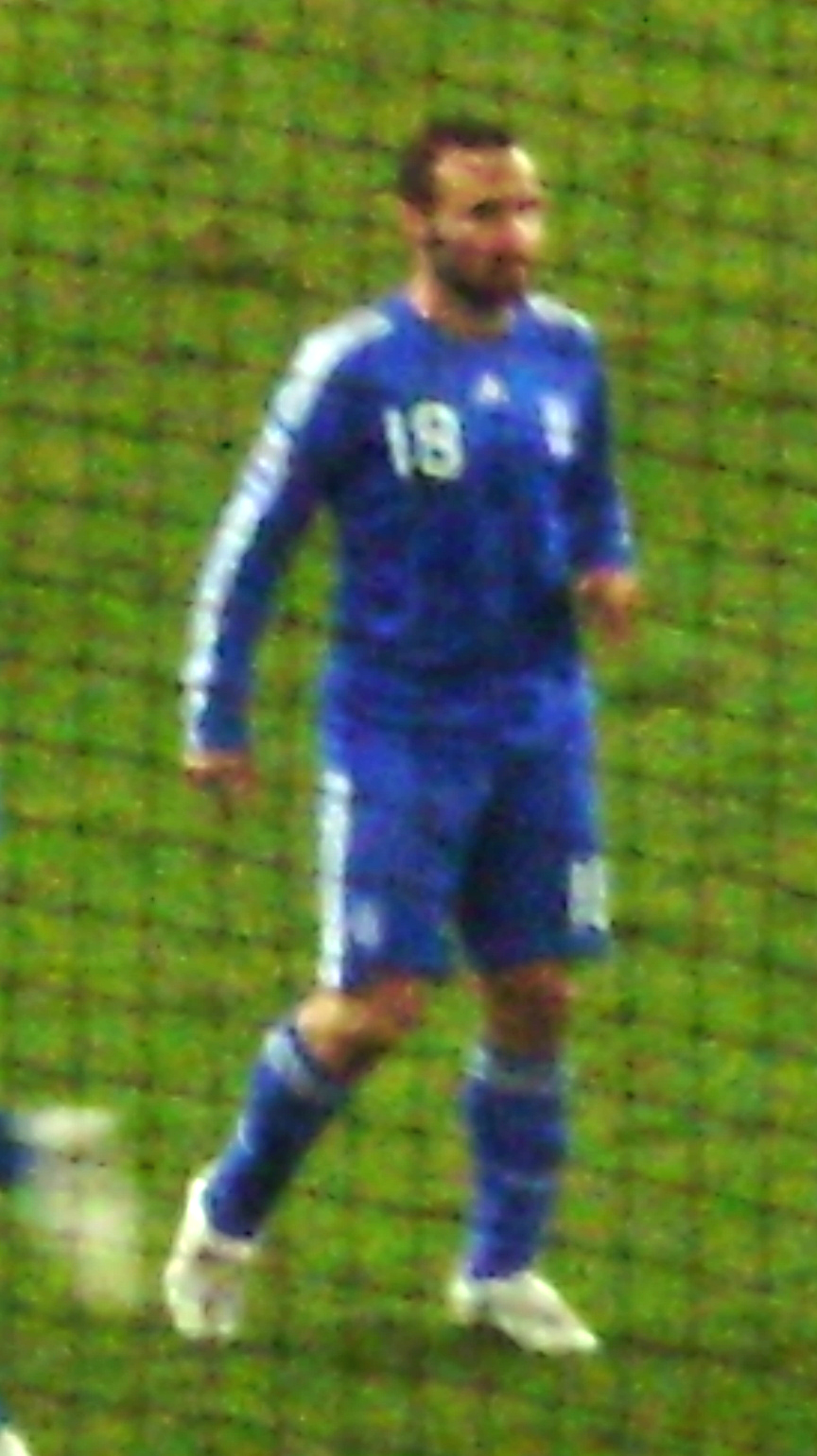
Dimitris Salpigidis Greece vs Moldova in 2008

Salpingidis has made 82 appearances and scored 13 times for the Greece national football team, including the winning goal in the away leg of the 2010 FIFA World Cup qualification play-offs against Ukraine, which sent Greece through to the final tournament. He made his debut for the national team on 17 August 2005 against Belgium. On 17 June 2010, in a 2010 FIFA World Cup group stage match against Nigeria, he scored Greece's first ever World Cup goal with a shot from outside the area deflected off in Lukman Haruna. On 8 June 2012, Salpingidis came on as a substitute and scored Greece's first goal in the Euro 2012 tournament, in the opening match, a 1–1 draw against Poland, becoming the first ever Greek player who scored in both the FIFA World Cup and the UEFA Euro. Later in the quarterfinals against Germany, he assisted Giorgos Samaras' goal and also scored the last goal with a penalty against Manuel Neuer, a match that ended 4–2, resulting Germany proceeding to the semi-finals.

Ahead of the 2014 FIFA World Cup, Salpingidis expressed optimism about Greece's prospects in the tournament. He noted that Greece's objective was to advance beyond the group stage after being eliminated in the first round of the 2010 FIFA World Cup, where the team recorded its first World Cup victory. Salpingidis described Group C, which included Colombia, Japan, and Ivory Coast, as competitive and stated that Greece was capable of reaching the round of 16. He also emphasized the team's collective approach, stating that success was based on teamwork rather than individual star players. During the qualification campaign, Salpingidis scored four goals in nine appearances, making him one of Greece's leading goalscorers in qualifying.

== Career statistics ==
=== Club ===
Appearances and goals by club, season and competition
Club	Season	League			Greek Cup		Continental		Total	
Club	Season	Division	Apps	Goals	Apps	Goals	Apps	Goals	Apps	Goals
PAOK	1999–2000	Alpha Ethniki	0	0	0	0	1 (Note: Appearances in UEFA Cup)	1	1	1
AEL (loan)	1999–2000	Football League Greece	7	0	0	0	–		7	0
Kavala (loan)	2000–01	Beta Ethniki	18	5	2	0	–		17	5
Kavala (loan)	2001–02	Gamma Ethniki	25	20	5	1	–		33	21
Kavala (loan)	Total		43	25	7	1	–		50	26
PAOK	2002–03	Alpha Ethniki	15	3	4	2	4	1	23	6
PAOK	2003–04	Alpha Ethniki	29	16	5	2	4	0	38	18
PAOK	2004–05	Alpha Ethniki	29	14	3	1	4	2	36	17
PAOK	2005–06	Alpha Ethniki	30	17	1	0	6	3	37	20
PAOK	Total		103	50	13	5	18	6	134	61
Panathinaikos	2006–07	Super League Greece	27	14	6	0	8	3	41	17
Panathinaikos	2007–08	Super League Greece	30	15	1	0	7	4	38	19
Panathinaikos	2008–09	Super League Greece	34	12	4	0	12 (Note: Appearances in UEFA Champions League)	3	50	15
Panathinaikos	2009–10	Super League Greece	28	5	4	1	13 (Note: Appearances in UEFA Europa League)	6	45	12
Panathinaikos	Total		119	46	15	1	40	16	174	63
PAOK	2010–11	Super League Greece	36	9	6	1	11	2	53	12
PAOK	2011–12	Super League Greece	35	7	3	0	8	3	46	10
PAOK	2012–13	Super League Greece	31	11	7	3	3	0	41	14
PAOK	2013–14	Super League Greece	35	10	4	0	10	2	49	12
PAOK	2014–15	Super League Greece	22	3	1	0	8	0	31	3
PAOK	2015–16	Super League Greece	0	0	0	0	1	0	1	0
PAOK	Total		159	40	21	4	41	7	222	51
Career total			431	161	56	11	100	30	587	202

=== International ===
Appearances and goals by national team and year
National team	Year	Apps	Goals
Greece	2005	4	0
Greece	2006	7	0
Greece	2007	4	0
Greece	2008	11	1
Greece	2009	7	2
Greece	2010	11	3
Greece	2011	10	0
Greece	2012	10	4
Greece	2013	8	3
Greece	2014	10	0
Total		82	13

Scores and results list Greece's goal tally first, score column indicates score after each Salpingidis goal.

List of international goals scored by Dimitris Salpingidis
No.	Date	Venue	Opponent	Score	Result	Competition
1	5 February 2008	GSP Stadium, Strovolos, Cyprus	Czech Republic	1–0	1–0	Friendly
2	1 April 2009	Pankritio Stadium, Heraklion, Greece	Israel	1–0	2–1	2010 FIFA World Cup qualification
3	18 November 2009	Donbas Arena, Donetsk, Ukraine	Ukraine	1–0	1–0	2010 FIFA World Cup qualification
4	17 June 2010	Free State Stadium, Bloemfontein, South Africa	Nigeria	1–1	2–1	2010 FIFA World Cup
5	11 August 2010	Partizan Stadium, Belgrade, Serbia	Serbia	1–0	1–0	Friendly
6	12 October 2010	Karaiskakis Stadium, Athens, Greece	Israel	1–0	2–1	UEFA Euro 2012 qualification
7	29 February 2012	Pankritio Stadium, Heraklion, Greece	Belgium	1–0	1–1	Friendly
8	8 June 2012	Stadion Narodowy, Warsaw, Poland	Poland	1–1	1–1	UEFA Euro 2012
9	22 June 2012	PGE Arena Gdańsk, Gdańsk, Poland	Germany	2–4	2–4	UEFA Euro 2012
10	16 October 2012	Štadión Pasienky, Bratislava, Slovakia	Slovakia	1–0	1–0	2014 FIFA World Cup qualification
11	10 September 2013	Karaiskakis Stadium, Athens, Greece	Latvia	1–0	1–0	2014 FIFA World Cup qualification
12	15 October 2013	Karaiskakis Stadium, Athens, Greece	Liechtenstein	1–0	2–0	2014 FIFA World Cup qualification
13	15 November 2013	Karaiskakis Stadium, Athens, Greece	Romania	2–1	3–1	2014 FIFA World Cup qualification

== Honours ==
=== Club ===
PAOK

- Greek Cup: 2002–03; runner-up: 2013–14

Panathinaikos

- Super League Greece: 2009–10
- Greek Cup: 2009–10; runner-up: 2006–07

=== Individual ===
- Gamma Ethniki top scorer: 2001–02
- Alpha Ethniki top scorer: 2005–06
- Greek Footballer of the year: 2007–08, 2008–09
- PAOK MVP of the Season: 2003–04, 2004–05, 2005–06
