= Georgios Theodoridis =

Georgios Theodoridis may refer to:

- Georgios Theodoridis (footballer, born 1973), Greek footballer
- Georgios Theodoridis (sprinter) (born 1972), Greek sprinter

== See also ==
- Giorgos Theodoridis (born 1980), Greek footballer
