= Konstantinos Andriopoulos =

Greek footballer (1984–2011)

Personal information
- Full name: Konstantinos Andriopoulos
- Date of birth: 12 May 1984
- Place of birth: Paralia, Greece
- Date of death: 26 February 2011 (aged 26)
- Place of death: Kozani, Greece
- Height: 1.86 m (6 ft 1 in)
- Position: Goalkeeper

Youth career
- 1998–2002: Panachaiki Patras

Senior career*
Years	Team	Apps	(Gls)
2002–2004	Panachaiki Patras		
2004	Marko F.C.		
2004	PAOK	1	(0)
2006–2007	AS Rodos		
2007	Nafpaktiakos Asteras		
2008	Niki Volos		
2008–2009	Olympiacos Volos	3	(0)
2009–2010	PAE Veria		
- * Club domestic league appearances and goals

Konstantinos Andriopoulos (Greek: Κωνσταντίνος Ανδριόπουλος; 12 May 1984 – 26 February 2011) was a Greek footballer who played as a goalkeeper.

== Career ==
Andriopoulos signed at PAOK in January 2003. In 2004–05 was on loan in GS Marko. In the summer of 2005 released from PAOK, he transferred in PAS Giannina but the transfer was cancelled. Finally he signed onto AS Rodos. In 2007–08 he played for Niki Volos GS and in 2008–09 he played for Olympiacos Volos. In 2009–10 he played for Veroia.

== Death ==
Andriopoulos died on 26 February 2011 of leukemia.
