= Francesco Scardina =

Italian footballer

Personal information
- Date of birth: 11 December 1981 (age 44)
- Place of birth: Rivalta di Torino, Italy
- Height: 1.81 m (5 ft 11 in)
- Position: Defender

Youth career
- 1998–1999: Juventus

Senior career*
Years	Team	Apps	(Gls)
1999–2003	Juventus	0	(0)
2001–2002	→ Cesena (loan)	6	(0)
2001–2002	Juventus	0	(0)
2002–2003	→ PAOK (loan)	0	(0)
2003	→ L'Aquila (loan)	10	(0)
2003–2006	Crotone	60	(1)
2006–2008	Vicenza	69	(4)
2008–2010	Chievo	14	(0)
2010–2012	Cittadella	40	(1)
2012–2013	Nocerina	11	(0)
2013–2015	Huesca	56	(1)

International career^{‡}
1998–1999	Italy U-18	9	(0)
- * Club domestic league appearances and goals as of 23 May 2023 ‡ National team caps and goals as of 23 May 2023

Francesco Scardina (born 11 December 1981 in Rivalta di Torino) is an Italian former footballer who played as a defender.

== Early life ==
Scardina was born in Turin to parents of Palermite origin and raised in Pasta, a small hamlet of the town of Rivalta di Torino.

His football legends are Paolo Montero and Carles Puyol.

In 2013 he obtained the UEFA B Licence, receiving the qualification to coach any amateur team or youth selection.

== Club career ==
He began his career in the youth team of Juventus, being called up for the first time by Marcello Lippi at the age of 16 for matches in Coppa Italia against Venice, without however starting.

In the winter transfer window of the 2001-2002 season he was sent on loan to Cesena in Serie C1, but after 6 appearances from the bench he was recalled by Juventus and joined the first team, being called up for some matches of 2000–01 UEFA Champions League and Serie A.

In the next year he initially played in the Super League Greece with a loan to PAOK where he played some matches of the Greek Football Cup (won in that season by the team from Thessaloniki), then returned to Italy on loan in the month of January and played the final part of the season in Serie C1 as a starter with the team L'Aquila Calcio, which in that season finished penultimate in the standings but then won the play-out against the Paternò team. At the end of that season he was lined up by the coach Augusto Gentilini also as a full-back, both left (his natural side) and right side, since he had a good ductility.

In the 2003–2004 season he was bought in co-ownership by Crotone, which in that season was coached by Gian Piero Gasperini, that had already been his coach in the Juventus youth team; and participated in the championship of Serie C1 in which he could play regularly as starter (34 matches, 1 assist and 1 goal against the Teramo team) and won promotion to Serie B. He stayed in Calabria for another season and a half, playing another 31 games before moving on in January 2006 with a co-ownership deal to Vicenza managed by Giancarlo Camolese. He initially struggled to find space with the red and white team, however ending the season as a starter also due to the numerous injuries of his teammates and taking the field on 12 games. His second season in Vicenza was undermined by some injuries, however he took the field in 23 games. The third season with the berici team he played games, confirming himself also in the penalty area with 3 goals in the league (including a brace against his ex-team Cesena) and 1 goal in Coppa Italia.

Released at the end of the season, in the summer of 2008 he was signed by ChievoVerona in Serie A. With head coach Giuseppe Iachini he earned a starting position until the match against Fiorentina, when he received a red card after a tackle on Franco Semioli. In the meantime the team changed the technical leadership (up to that moment ChievoVerona had earned only 6 points in ten games), and the new coach Domenico Di Carlo preferred to play with greater physical prowess' players, moving Scardina to not renew the expiring contract after two seasons and 16 appearances (and after having gone very close to score against Inter Milan that in that season completed an unprecedented Italian seasonal treble, goal that was however reported as own goal by Thiago Motta).

In the season 2010–2011 he moved on a free transfer to the Cittadella team in [Serie B]. After the first part of the season as a starter, in November he injured his calf, missing some matches, and then in January he suffered a knee injury in the warm-up before the match against Torino. After a three-week break he kept being deployed in an up-and-down manner until deciding to go for surgery, closing the season with 21 appearances and 1 goal scored. During his next season, already recovered from his knee injury, and after a good second half of the season and 21 appearances his contract with the Cittadella expired.

On 10 September 2012 he moved to Nocerina. With the "Molossi", he ends the season with 13 appearances to his credit, starting the games of the playoff semi-finals, in which, however, after the draw in the two matches, it was Latina who was promoted to the cadet series for the best position in the Lega Pro Prima Divisione.

At the end of the season, he was released as free agent and left for the Centro Tecnico Federale di Coverciano for the training camp of the Italian players released under the aegis of the Italian Footballers' Association. During that time, he passed the course organized by the AIC itself and by the Italian Football Federation, obtaining the UEFA B Licence.

On the last transfer market day he signed for the 2013 season by Huesca. He spent 2 excellent seasons with the Aragonese club, culminating with his presence at Camp Nou in King's Cup as captain against Barcelona of Iniesta, Pedro and Mascherano and the promotion to Liga Adelante, finishing first in the group 2 and winning the play-offs.

In July 2015, following a change of management in the Huesca Club, he decided to terminate his contract. On 9 September of the same year, through a public notice on his social media, he announced his retirement from football.

In 2016 he started working as an individual technique coach in Spain.

== International career ==
He played 9 matches with the Italy national under-18 football team, making his debut in the selection of Francesco Rocca on 10 May 2000 against Czech Republic U18 as substitute for Giuseppe Sculli.

== Player profile ==
=== Style of play ===
Central defender, occasionally adapted to the role of full back, he had good qualities both from a technical point of view (good at anticipating, marking, positioning) and personally as leader of the dressing room, becoming captain while playing for Cittadella and Huesca.
