= Napoleon Amaefule =

Nigerian footballer

Personal information
- Date of birth: 26 December 1980 (age 44)
- Place of birth: Nigeria
- Height: 1.78 m (5 ft 10 in)
- Position(s): Forward

Senior career*
Years	Team	Apps	(Gls)
1998–1999	Okęcie Warsaw		
1999	Hetman Zamość		
1999–2000	Odra Opole		
2000	Jeziorak Iława		
2000–2001	Lechia-Polonia Gdańsk	17	(1)
2001	Polar Wrocław		
2001–2003	Polonia Warsaw	2	(0)
2003–2004	PAOK	1	(0)
2004–2005	Shooting Stars		
2006	Promień Żary		
- *Club domestic league appearances and goals

Napoleon Amaefule (born 26 December 1980) is a Nigerian former professional footballer who played as a forward.

== Career ==
In 2001, Amaefule signed for Polish top flight side Polonia Warsaw after playing for Okęcie Warsaw, Hetman Zamość, Odra Opole, Jeziorak Iława, Lechia-Polonia Gdańsk and Polar Wrocław in Polish lower leagues, all for half a season.

In 2003, he joined his brother Thankgod at PAOK, one of the most successful Greek teams, as an emergency signing on the last day of the summer transfer window. However, Amaefule only made 2 appearances there.

== Personal life ==
His brother is Thankgod Amaefule.
