= Nikos Nikolopoulos (footballer) =

Greek footballer

Personal information
- Full name: Nikolaos Nikolopoulos
- Date of birth: 12 June 1999 (age 27)
- Place of birth: Athens, Greece
- Height: 1.83 m (6 ft 0 in)
- Position: Centre-back

Team information
- Current team: Campodarsego

Youth career
- PAS Giannina

Senior career*
Years	Team	Apps	(Gls)
2018–2019	Catanzaro	2	(0)
2019–	Campodarsego	19	(0)
- * Club domestic league appearances and goals as of 16 February 2020

Nikos Nikolopoulos (Greek: Νίκος Νικολόπουλος; born 12 June 1999) is a Greek professional footballer who plays as a centre-back for Italian club Campodarsego.
