= Ebenezer Hagan =

Ghanaian footballer

Personal information
- Full name: Ebenezer Benyarko Hagan
- Date of birth: 1 October 1975 (age 51)
- Place of birth: Kumasi, Ghana
- Height: 1.77 m (5 ft 9 1/2 in)
- Position: Midfielder

Team information
- Current team: PAOK (Youth Assistant U17)

Senior career*
Years	Team	Apps	(Gls)
1993–1995	Ashanti Gold	95	(9)
1995–1998	Kalamata	71	(9)
1998–2003	Iraklis	136	(15)
2003–2005	PAOK	30	(4)
2005	APOEL	10	(1)
2005–2006	Sekondi Hasaacas	14	(8)
2006–2007	PAONE	0	(0)
Total		356	(46)

International career
1994–1997	Ghana	12	(1)

Managerial career
- 2010: PAONE (Coach)
- 2011–2013: Iraklis (Technical Director)
- 2013–2015: Ethnikos Pyleas (Technical Director)
- 2015–2018: Megas Alexandros (Technical Director)
- 2018–: PAOK (Youth Assistant U17)
- * Club domestic league appearances and goals

Ebenezer Benyarko Hagan (born 1 October 1975 in Kumasi) is a former Ghanaian international footballer who last played for Sekondi Hasaacas F.C. in the Ghana Premier League.

== Career ==
He played eight years in Greece for Kalamata F.C., Iraklis Saloniki and PAOK FC and played 235 games and scored 31 goals. After 8 years in Greece he moved to APOEL in Nicosia, Cyprus, where he played for six months, appearing in 10 games and scoring 1 goal. On 1 September 2006 he moved to Sekondi Hasaacas F.C. in Ghana, where he ended his career in 2007.

== International ==
He was a member of the Ghana national football team at the 1996 Summer Olympics in Atlanta. He played 4 games and scored 1 goal.
