= Georgios Zisopoulos =

Greek footballer

Personal information
- Full name: Georgios Zisopoulos
- Date of birth: 23 May 1984 (age 42)
- Place of birth: Katerini, Greece
- Height: 1.82 m (5 ft 11 1/2 in)
- Position: Defensive midfielder

Youth career
- 1998–2002: Aris

Senior career*
Years	Team	Apps	(Gls)
2002–2003	Aris	0	(0)
2003–2005	PAOK	17	(0)
2005–2010	Levadiakos	128	(4)
2010–2011	Panthrakikos	32	(2)
2011–2013	Levadiakos	56	(5)
2013–2016	Asteras Tripolis	92	(1)
2016–2018	Atromitos	21	(0)
2018	Apollon Smyrnis	13	(0)
2018–2019	Levadiakos	29	(1)
2019–2020	Apollon Smyrnis	15	(0)

International career^{‡}
2004	Greece U21	1	(0)
- * Club domestic league appearances and goals as of 25 July 2020 ‡ National team caps and goals as of 18 August 2004

Georgios Zisopoulos (Greek: Γεώργιος Ζησόπουλος; born 23 May 1984) is a Greek former professional footballer who played as a defensive midfielder.

== Career ==
Born in Katerini, Zisopoulos began playing football for PAOK, signing a professional contract in December 2004. On 22 May 2004, he made his debut in the Super League Greece as a late substitute in an away game against rivals Aris. He would only make 18 league appearances for the club before moving to Levadiakos in August 2005. He stayed in the club for five consecutive years, before he joined Greek second division side Panthrakikos in August 2010. He returned to Levadiakos F.C. after a year playing for two years in Super League. On 11 June 2013 Zisopoulos signed for Asteras Tripolis. On 21 August 2014, he scored his first goal in international competition in a 2–0 home win against Maccabi Tel Aviv for the 1st leg qualification round of UEFA Europa League. According to a Greek newspaper, Israeli, Belgian and Turkish clubs are interested in signing the defensive midfielder and Israeli Premier League club Hapoel Be'er Sheva have made an official transfer offer, but he seems not willing to continue his career at Israel.

On 23 April 2016, he did not renew his contract with the club, seeking for his next destination in his career. On 14 June 2016, he signed a two years' contract with Atromitos for an undisclosed fee.
