= Leonidas Vokolos =

Greek footballer and manager

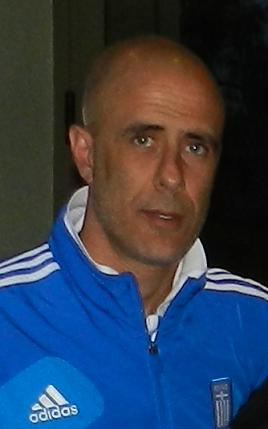

Personal information
- Full name: Leonidas Vokolos
- Date of birth: 31 August 1970 (age 56)
- Place of birth: Athens, Greece
- Height: 1.92 m (6 ft 3 1/2 in)
- Position: Defender

Senior career*
Years	Team	Apps	(Gls)
1986–1998	Panionios	203	(15)
1998–2003	Panathinaikos	90	(5)
2003–2005	PAOK	39	(0)
2005–2006	Kallithea	23	(1)
2006–2007	APOP Kinyras Peyias	12	(0)
Total		367	(21)

International career
1998–2001	Greece	7	(1)

Managerial career
- 2008–2009: Panathinaikos U20 (assistant)
- 2009–2010: Greece U17
- 2010–2011: Greece U19
- 2011–2014: Greece (assistant)
- 2014–2016: Panathinaikos (technical director)
- 2016: Panegialios
- 2017–2018: Sparta Prague (technical director)
- 2019: Kerkyra
- 2020: Olympiacos Volos
- 2020: Panionios
- 2021: Olympiakos Nicosia
- 2021–2022: Kallithea
- 2023–2024: Lamia
- 2024–2025: Lamia
- 2025: Atromitos
- * Club domestic league appearances and goals

Leonidas Vokolos (Greek: Λεωνίδας Βόκολος, born 31 August 1970) is a Greek professional football manager and former player.

== Playing career ==
He started his career playing for Panionios. Afterwards, he was transferred to Greek giants Panathinaikos, where he won the Double in 2004. He then played for PAOK, Kallithea in Greece and APOP Kinyras Peyias in Cyprus.

Vokolos was known for his reliability in defence and his very good heading and jumping ability. He played as well for the Greece national football team.

== Managerial career ==
As of May 2010, Vokolos is the coach of Greece's U-17 national team. As of 5 August 2011, Fernando Santos has appointed Vokolos as the assistant coach of the Greece national football team; he replaced Zisis Vryzas.

== Honours ==
Panionios

- Greek Cup: 1997–98
