= Thankgod Amaefule =

Nigerian footballer

Personal information
- Date of birth: 16 December 1984 (age 41)
- Place of birth: Port Harcourt, Nigeria
- Height: 1.86 m (6 ft 1 in)
- Position: Striker

Youth career
- 1994–1999: Veria

Senior career*
| Years | Team | Apps | (Gls) |
| 2000 | Jeziorak Iława | | |
| 2000–2003 | Okęcie Warsaw | | |
| 2003–2005 | PAOK | 8 | (0) |
| 2005–2007 | Veria | 35 | (8) |
| 2007–2008 | Dolphins | | |
| 2009–2012 | Sharks | | |
| 2012–2017 | Heartland | | |

International career
| 2010 | Nigeria | 1 | (0) |
- * Club domestic league appearances and goals

Thankgod Amaefule (born 16 December 1984 in Port Harcourt) is a Nigerian former professional footballer who played as a striker.

Amaefule joined Dolphins in the summer of 2007, after playing several seasons in Poland and Greece, including Veria in the Greek second level. He was excluded from the remainder of Dolphins' 2008 CAF Confederation Cup campaign because of insubordination and inciting disunity. He transferred to crosstown rival Sharks and was a part of their run to the FA Cup final. He played his only match for Nigeria on 3 March 2010 against DR Congo.

== Personal life ==
His brother is Napoleon Amaefule.
