= Liasos Louka =

Cypriot footballer and manager (born 1980)

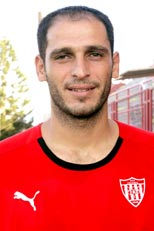

Personal information
- Full name: Liasos Louka
- Date of birth: 1 February 1980 (age 46)
- Place of birth: Limassol, Cyprus
- Height: 1.81 m (5 ft 11 in)
- Position: Midfielder

Team information
- Current team: Aris Limassol FC

Youth career
- Nea Salamina

Senior career*
Years	Team	Apps	(Gls)
1999–2003	Nea Salamina	66	(14)
2003–2005	PAOK	9	(0)
2005–2007	AEL Limassol	50	(5)
2007–2011	Nea Salamina	73	(9)
2011–2012	AEP Paphos	22	(1)
2012–2013	AEK Kouklia	25	(7)
2013–2017	Karmiotissa Polemidion	44	(13)

International career
- Cyprus

Managerial career
- 2015–2017: Karmiotissa Polemidion
- 2017: Nea Salamina
- 2018–2019: AEZ Zakakiou
- 2019–2022: Aris Limassol
- 2022: Achyronas-Onisilos
- 2022–2024: AEZ Zakakiou
- 2024–2025: Krasava ENY Ypsonas
- 2025–2026: Karmiotissa FC
- 2026–: Aris Limassol
- * Club domestic league appearances and goals as of 26 September 2015

Liasos Louka (Greek: Λιάσος Λουκά; born 1 February 1980) is a Cypriot football manager and former player. He is the current manager of Aris Limassol.

Louka started his career at Nea Salamina. He has also played for PAOK, AEL Limassol, AEP Paphos, AEK Kouklia before finishing his career at Karmiotissa, where he was a player-manager.

As a manager, he has led Karmiotissa, Aris Limassol, AEZ Zakakiou and Krasava ENY Ypsonas to promotion from Second to First Division, in 2016, 2021, 2023 and 2025 respectively.

== Honours ==
=== Player ===
Nea Salamina

- Cypriot Second Division (1) : 2001–02

Karmiotissa Polemidion

- Cypriot Second Division B2: 1

2013-14

=== Manager ===
Karmiotissa

- Cypriot Second Division (1) : 2015–2016

Krasava ENY Ypsonas

- Cypriot Second Division (1) : 2024–2025
