= Aboubacar Fofana =

French footballer (born 1982)

Personal information
- Full name: Aboubacar Fofana
- Date of birth: October 4, 1982 (age 44)
- Place of birth: France
- Height: 1.83 m (6 ft 0 in)
- Position: Midfielder

Senior career*
Years	Team	Apps	(Gls)
?–2003	Juventus	?	(?)
2002–2003	→ PAOK (loan)	2	(1)
2003–2004	Millwall	16	(0)
2005–2007	ASC Jeanne d'Arc	?	(?)
2007–2008	Dukla Banská Bystrica	?	(?)
2008–2012	Séwé Sports	?	(?)
2012–2013	K.F.C. Izegem	20	(8)
- * Club domestic league appearances and goals

Aboubacar Fofana (born October 4, 1982) is a French former footballer who played as a midfielder.

== Career ==
In August 2003, Fofana was signed for Mark McGhee's side Millwall; this was after being released by Italian giants Juventus after an unsuccessful one-year loan with Greek Super League side PAOK. He played his first game for The Lions when they played Gillingham on 6 September 2003, in which Gillingham won 4–3. Fofana played 16 more games after that and was released in 2004. He transferred to Malian side Jeanne d'Arc FC.

== Honours ==
Juventus

- Serie A: (1)

2002

- Coppa Italia: (1)

2002

PAOK

- Greek Cup: (1)

2003

Millwall

- FA Cup: (1) Finalists

2004

Séwé Sports

- Ligue 1: (1)

2012.

- Coupe Houphouët-Boigny: (1)

2012.
