= Alexandros Garpozis =

Cypriot footballer (born 1980)

Personal information
- Full name: Alexandros Garpozis
- Date of birth: 5 September 1980 (age 46)
- Place of birth: Limassol, Cyprus
- Height: 1.81 m (5 ft 11 in)
- Position: Midfielder

Team information
- Current team: Karmiotissa (manager)

Youth career
- AEL Limassol

Senior career*
Years	Team	Apps	(Gls)
1998–2004	AEL Limassol	98	(35)
2004–2005	PAOK	7	(0)
2005–2007	Skoda Xanthi	60	(9)
2007–2009	Apollon Limassol	43	(3)
2009	Anorthosis	15	(1)
2010–2011	AEL Limassol	22	(1)
2011–2013	AEP Paphos	48	(4)
2013–2014	AEK Kouklia	26	(2)
2014–2015	Pafos FC	20	(5)
2015–2016	AEZ Zakakiou	25	(2)
Total		364	(62)

International career^{‡}
2003–2011	Cyprus	35	(1)

Managerial career
- 2016: AEZ Zakakiou (assistant)
- 2016: AEZ Zakakiou (caretaker)
- 2017: AEL Limassol (assistant)
- 2018: Aris Limassol (assistant)
- 2019–2021: APEP
- 2021–2022: Peyia 2014
- 2023: Othellos Athienou
- 2024: AEL Limassol
- 2024–2025: Karmiotissa
- 2025: Akritas Chlorakas
- 2026–: Karmiotissa
- * Club domestic league appearances and goals as of 30 March 2016 ‡ National team caps and goals as of December 9, 2009

Alexandros Garpozis (Greek: Αλέξανδρος Γαρπόζης; born September 5, 1980) is retired Cypriot football midfielder. During his career he played for Anorthosis, Skoda Xanthi, PAOK, AEL Limassol, Apollon Limassol, AEZ Zakakiou, AEP Paphos and AEK Kouklia.
