= Christos Lambakis =

Greek footballer (born in 1979)

Personal information
- Date of birth: 19 February 1979 (age 47)
- Place of birth: Kozani, Greece
- Height: 1.91 m (6 ft 3 in)
- Position: Goalkeeper

Senior career*
Years	Team	Apps	(Gls)
1999–2004	Aris	21	(0)
2004	PAOK	0	(0)
2005	Kerkyra	1	(0)
2005–2006	APOP Kinyras	5	(0)
2006–2007	AEL Limassol	0	(0)
2010–2012	Agrotikos Asteras	26	(0)
2012–2013	Anagennisi Giannitsa	28	(0)
2013–2014	Pierikos	7	(0)
2014	Panachaiki	7	(0)
Total		95	(0)
- * Club domestic league appearances and goals

Christos Lambakis (Greek: Χρήστος Λαμπάκης; born 19 February 1979) is a Greek former professional footballer who played as a goalkeeper.
