= Okęcie Warsaw =

Polish sporting club

- Full name: Robotniczy Klub Sportowy; Okęcie Warsaw
- Founded: May 1929; 96 years ago
- Ground: Radarowa 1 Stadium
- Capacity: 900
- Chairman: Tomasz Janicki
- Manager: Adam Warszawski
- League: Regional league Warsaw I
- 2024–25: Regional league Warsaw I, 12th of 16
- Website: https://rksokecie.pl

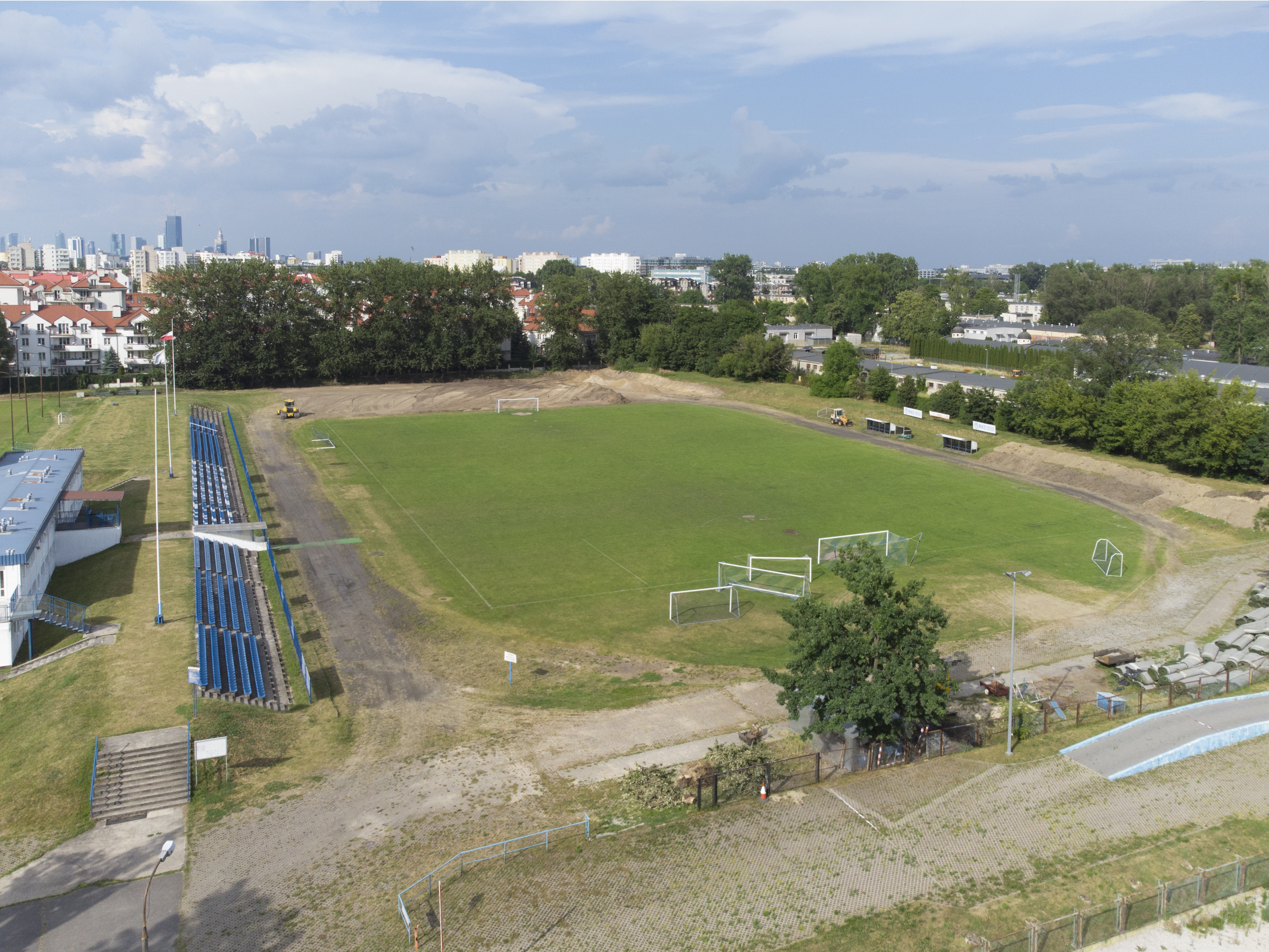
Aerial view of the stadium (2024)

Okęcie Warsaw is a Polish sports club from the Okęcie neighbourhood of Warsaw. Founded in 1929 as Skoda Warsaw, its name was changed to Okęcie in 1936. The club is located at 1 Radarowa Street in Warsaw. Its colors are blue-white. Their association football team currently competes in the Warsaw regional league.

Okęcie is most famous for its boxers (including Antoni Czortek), who in the 1930s were multiple champions of Poland, including at the team championship of the country (1934), and for its association football team. It also runs a tennis club.
