= Georgios Koutsis =

Greek footballer and manager

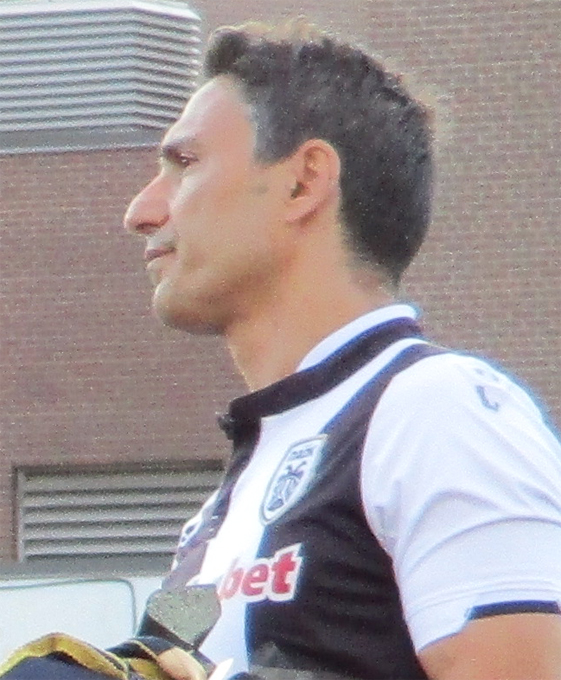
- Koutsis in 2017

Personal information
- Full name: Georgios Koutsis
- Date of birth: 10 September 1973 (age 53)
- Place of birth: Athens, Greece
- Height: 1.85 m (6 ft 1 in)
- Position: Central midfielder

Senior career*
Years	Team	Apps	(Gls)
1993–1995	Aris Petroupolis	33	(2)
1995–1996	Pannafpliakos		
1996–1999	Panelefsiniakos	78	(8)
1999–2002	Aris	76	(9)
2002–2005	PAOK	73	(7)
2005	Chalkidona	13	(0)
2005–2007	Atromitos	40	(2)
2007–2011	Agrotikos Asteras	100	(9)
Total		413	(37)

International career
1999	Greece	4	(0)

Managerial career
- 2011–2012: Agrotikos Asteras
- 2012–2013: Panachaiki
- 2013–2014: Fokikos
- 2014: Iraklis Psachna
- 2014–2015: Olympiacos Volos
- 2015: Agrotikos Asteras
- 2017–2018: Paniliakos
- 2018: Niki Volos
- 2018–2019: Panargiakos
- 2019–2020: Asteras Vlachioti
- 2021: Kallithea
- 2022: Paniliakos
- 2022–2023: Agios Nikolaos
- 2023: Thermaikos Thermis
- 2024: Nea Artaki
- 2024–2025: Thermaikos Thermis
- 2025: Kampaniakos
- * Club domestic league appearances and goals

Georgios Koutsis (Greek: Γεώργιος Κούτσης; born 10 September 1973) is a Greek professional football manager and former player.

== Career ==
Born in Athens, Koutsis began playing football as a midfielder for Pannafpliakos F.C. before joining Panelefsiniakos F.C. in 1995. He would play for Aris Thessaloniki F.C. and PAOK, where he would make over 100 Alpha Ethniki appearances. Koutsis won the 2002–03 Greek Cup with PAOK.

Koutsis retired from playing in the summer of 2011, and was immediately appointed manager of Agrotikos Asteras.

== Honours ==
PAOK

- Greek Cup: 2002–03
