= Yiasoumis Yiasoumi =

Cypriot footballer (born 1975)

Personal information
- Full name: Yiasoumis Yiasoumi
- Date of birth: 31 May 1975 (age 51)
- Place of birth: Larnaca, Cyprus
- Height: 1.85 m (6 ft 1 in)
- Position: Striker

Youth career
- 1989–1992: Enosis Neon Paralimni

Senior career*
Years	Team	Apps	(Gls)
1992–1998	Enosis Neon Paralimni	80	(13)
1998–2001	APOEL	70	(46)
2001–2007	PAOK	118	(27)
2007–2008	Aris Limassol	24	(3)
2008–2009	Ethnikos Achna	17	(11)
2009–2010	AEK Larnaca	23	(4)
Total		332	(104)

International career^{‡}
2000–2009	Cyprus	64	(8)

Managerial career
- 2020–: Enosis Neon Paralimni (Assistant Manager)
- * Club domestic league appearances and goals as of 17 November 2011 ‡ National team caps and goals as of 9 August 2025

Yiasoumis Yiasoumi (Greek: Γιασουμής Γιασουμή) or Yiasemakis Yiasemi (Greek: Γιασεμάκης Γιασεμή) (born 31 May 1975) is a retired Cypriot footballer who last played for AEK Larnaca. He was also a player for Enosis Neon Paralimni, APOEL, PAOK, Aris Limassol and Ethnikos Achna.

Yiasoumi has made 64 appearances for the Cyprus national football team in which he scored 8 goals.

== Career statistics ==
=== International ===
Appearances and goals by national team and year
National team	Year	Apps	Goals
Cyprus	1998	1	1
Cyprus	1999	1	0
Cyprus	2000	4	0
Cyprus	2001	6	1
Cyprus	2002	6	1
Cyprus	2003	6	1
Cyprus	2004	5	0
Cyprus	2005	10	2
Cyprus	2006	5	1
Cyprus	2007	11	1
Cyprus	2008	4	0
Cyprus	2009	5	0
Total		64	8

Scores and results list Cyprus' goal tally first, score column indicates score after each Yiasoumi goal.

List of international goals scored by Yiasoumis Yiasoumi
No.	Date	Venue	Opponent	Score	Result	Competition	Ref.
1	27 October 1998	Paralimni Stadium, Paralimni, Cyprus	Kuwait	–	5–3	Friendly	
2	26 February 2001	Tsirio Stadium, Limassol, Cyprus	Lithuania	1–0	1–2	Friendly	
3	13 February 2002	GSP Stadium, Nicosia, Cyprus	Czech Republic	1–0	3–4	Friendly	
4	11 October 2003	Tsirio Stadium, Limassol, Cyprus	Slovenia	2–2	2–2	UEFA Euro 2004 qualifying	
5	13 August 2005	Tsirio Stadium, Limassol, Cyprus	Iraq	1–1	2–1	Friendly	
6	13 August 2005	Tsirio Stadium, Limassol, Cyprus	Iraq	2–1	2–1	Friendly	
7	2 September 2006	Tehelné pole, Bratislava, Slovakia	Slovakia	1–6	1–6	UEFA Euro 2008 qualifying	
8	6 February 2007	Tsirio Stadium, Limassol, Cyprus	Hungary	1–0	2–1	Friendly	

== Honours ==
APOEL

- Cypriot Cup: 1998–99

PAOK

- Greek Cup: 2002–03
