= Athanasios Tsigas =

Greek footballer (born 1982)

Thanasis Tsigas
Personal information
- Full name: Athanasios Tsigas
- Date of birth: 20 September 1982 (age 44)
- Place of birth: Alexandroupoli, Greece
- Height: 1.86 m (6 ft 1 in)
- Position: Striker

Youth career
- 1999–2001: PAE Thraki

Senior career*
Years	Team	Apps	(Gls)
2001–2004	Paniliakos	63	(10)
2004–2006	Kallithea	36	(9)
2006–2008	Panathinaikos	4	(2)
2006	→ PAOK (loan)	9	(2)
2008	→ Atromitos (loan)	13	(3)
2008–2009	AEL	20	(2)
2009–2012	Kerkyra	59	(13)
2012–2013	AEL	29	(4)
2013	Glyfada	4	(1)
2014	Ionikos		
2015	Kallithea	11	(0)
- * Club domestic league appearances and goals as of 4 December 2013 ‡ National team caps and goals as of 8 July 2013

Thanasis Tsigas (Greek: Αθανάσιος Τσίγκας; born 20 September 1982) is a Greek former footballer, who played as a striker.

== Career ==
He is a professional since 2001 and he played for Paniliakos, Kallithea, PAOK, Panathinaikos and Atromitos. He was the first striker that Larissa signed in for 2008–09 season. On early August 2009, Panthrakikos expressed their interest on signing Tsigas but he was finally transferred to Beta Ethniki club Kerkyra, with which were promoted to the Super League.
