= Marcin Mięciel =

Polish footballer (born 1975)

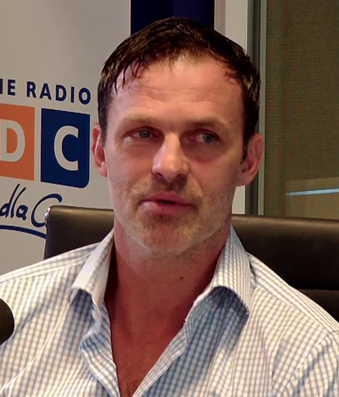

Personal information
- Date of birth: 22 December 1975 (age 50)
- Place of birth: Gdynia, Poland
- Height: 1.85 m (6 ft 1 in)
- Position: Striker

Youth career
- 1989–1990: Wisła Tczew
- 1990–1993: Lechia Gdańsk

Senior career*
Years	Team	Apps	(Gls)
1993–1994	Hutnik Warsaw	26	(4)
1994–2002	Legia Warsaw	173	(51)
1995	→ ŁKS Łódź (loan)	16	(6)
2001–2002	→ Borussia Mönchengladbach (loan)	18	(2)
2002–2005	Iraklis	64	(16)
2005–2007	PAOK	67	(24)
2007–2009	VfL Bochum	37	(6)
2009–2010	Legia Warsaw	23	(5)
2010–2012	ŁKS Łódź	47	(14)
2012	UKS Łady		
Total		467	(128)

International career
1996–2002	Poland	5	(1)
- * Club domestic league appearances and goals

Marcin Mięciel (born 22 December 1975) is a Polish former professional footballer who played as a striker. His trademark was the bicycle kick.

== Career ==
Born in Gdynia, Mięciel started his football career at Wisła Tczew for which he played until 1990. The next stop in his career was Lechia Gdańsk. In December 1993 he transferred to Hutnik Warsaw, but after only six months he moved on to local rivals Legia Warsaw where he played until 2001, only interrupted by a half-year loan to ŁKS Łódź in 1995).

After a disappointing season at Borussia Mönchengladbach Mięciel moved on to Greece and signed for Iraklis. After two and a half seasons, he moved to the local rivals, PAOK. He scored five goals in 13 games till the end of the 2004–05 season. In his second season, he scored five times in 25 matches. His most successful season was 2006–07: in 29 matches he netted 14 goals. He was one of the topscorers in the Greek league and PAOK's "most valuable player" of that season.

After his first disappointing attempt in the German Bundesliga with Borussia Mönchengladbach, Mięciel returned for the 2007–08 season, this time to play for VfL Bochum. The transfer fee was estimated at €250,000. For the 2009–10 season, he returned to Legia Warsaw on a free transfer. Ahead the 2010–11 season, he joined ŁKS Łódź on a free transfer.

== Honours ==
Legia Warsaw

- Ekstraklasa: 1994–95
- Polish Cup: 1994–95, 1996–97
- Polish Super Cup: 1994, 1997

ŁKS Łódź

- I liga: 2010–11

Individual

- PAOK MVP of the Season: 2006–07
