= Stavros Mavrothalassitis Stadium =

Football stadium in Aigaleo, Athens, Greece

- "Egaleo Stadium"
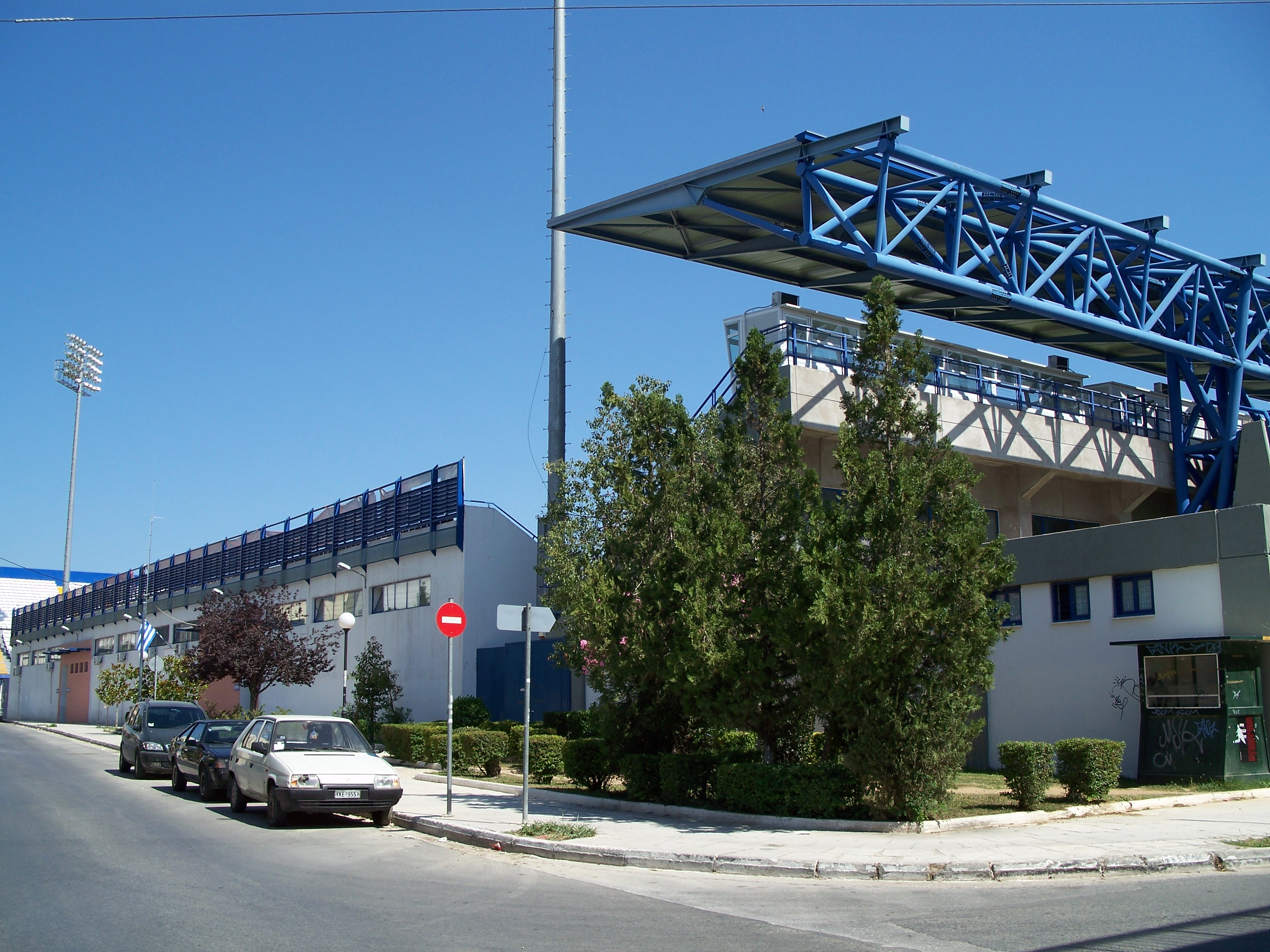
- Interactive map of Stavros Mavrothalassitis Stadium
- Location: Aigaleo, Athens, Greece
- Coordinates: 37°59′13.81″N 23°40′33.64″E
- Operator: Egaleo F.C.
- Capacity: 8,217
- Surface: Grass

Construction
- Built: 1968

Tenant
- Egaleo

Stavros Mavrothalassitis Stadium is a football stadium in Aigaleo, a town and a suburb within the Athens agglomeration, Greece. It is currently used mostly for football games and is the home stadium of Egaleo. it has an effective capacity of 8,217 people. It was built in 1968 and named after Stavros Mavrothalassitis, then mayor of Aigaleo, in the 1960s. Ilisiakos also use the stadium currently.
