= Dionysis Chasiotis =

Greek footballer (born in 1975)

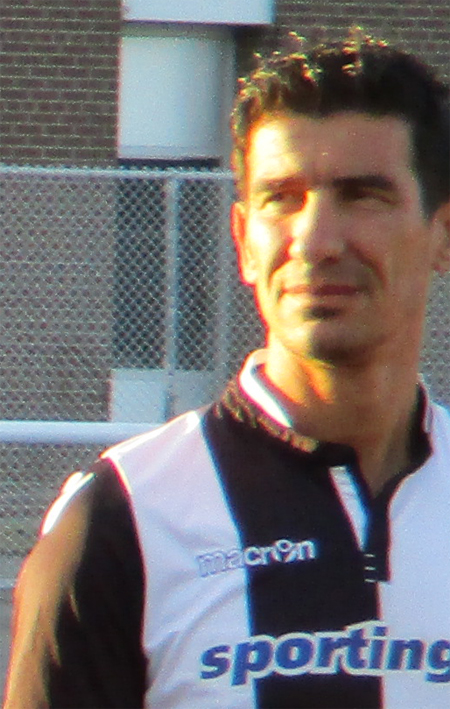
- Chasiotis in 2017

Personal information
- Full name: Dionysios Chasiotis
- Date of birth: 1 March 1975 (age 51)
- Place of birth: Katerini, Greece
- Height: 1.88 m (6 ft 2 in)
- Position: Defender

Youth career
- 1990–1995: Pierikos

Senior career*
Years	Team	Apps	(Gls)
1995–1998	Pierikos	53	(1)
1998–2007	PAOK	142	(3)
2007–2008	Kastoria	49	(3)
2008–2011	Agrotikos Asteras	78	(1)
2011–2012	Iraklis	20	(2)
Total		342	(10)

Managerial career
- 2017: Agrotikos Asteras
- 2018–: Kampaniakos
- * Club domestic league appearances and goals as of 1 July 2018

Dionysis Chasiotis (Greek: Διονύσης Χασιώτης; born 1 March 1975) is a Greek former footballer who played as a defender.

== Career ==
Born in Katerini, Chasiotis began his professional football career by joining local club Pierikos in July 1994. He later played for PAOK in the Super League Greece and Kastoria F.C. in the Football League (Greece).

== Honours ==
PAOK

- Greek Cup: 2000–01, 2002–03
