= Giorgos Theodoridis =

Greek footballer

Personal information
- Full name: Georgios Theodoridis
- Date of birth: 3 July 1980 (age 46)
- Place of birth: Frankfurt, West Germany
- Height: 1.77 m (5 ft 10 in)
- Position: Midfielder

Team information
- Current team: PAOK (Team Manager)

Youth career
- FV Biebrich

Senior career*
Years	Team	Apps	(Gls)
1997–2002	Aris	48	(3)
1999	→ Athinaikos (loan)	12	(0)
2003–2005	PAOK	36	(4)
2005–2007	Panathinaikos	13	(0)
2007–2008	Ergotelis	24	(1)
2008–2009	FSV Frankfurt	8	(1)
2009–2012	Panetolikos	87	(28)
2012–2013	Apollon Limassol	18	(4)
2013–2015	Panetolikos	37	(5)
2015	Agrotikos Asteras	0	(0)

International career^{‡}
2001–2002	Greece	2	(0)

Managerial career
- 2021–2024: PAOK U19 (Team Manager)
- 2024–: PAOK (Team Manager)
- * Club domestic league appearances and goals as of 15:37, 5 April 2015 (UTC) ‡ National team caps and goals as of 28 December 2008

Giorgos Theodoridis (Greek: Γιώργος Θεοδωρίδης; born 3 July 1980) is a Greek former professional footballer. After his retirement he follows his career as Team Manager in PAOK Academy and continues as a Team Manager at PAOK FC
