= 1994–95 PAOK FC season =

PAOK
1994–95 season
- President: Thomas Voulinos
- Manager: Arie Haan
- Stadium: Toumba Stadium
- Alpha Ethniki: 3rd
- Greek Cup: 2nd round
- Top goalscorer: League: Zouboulis (9); All: Zouboulis (10)
- Highest home attendance: 26,404 vs Olympiacos

The 1994–95 season was PAOK Football Club's 68th in existence and the club's 36th consecutive season in the top flight of Greek football. The team entered the Greek Football Cup in first round. By finishing 3rd in the league, PAOK would normally qualify for the next season's UEFA Cup, but Apollon Athens who finished 4th replaced them, because the club was carrying a 1-year ban from European competitions after being charged by UEFA for the eventful match against Paris Saint-Germain on 1 October 1992. PAOK conceded only 3 goals in 17 matches at home during the 1994–95 Alpha Ethniki.

== Players ==
=== Squad ===
Note: Flags indicate national team as defined under FIFA eligibility rules; some limited exceptions apply. Players may hold more than one non-FIFA nationality.

No.	Pos.	Nation	Player
—	GK	GRE	Nikolaos Michopoulos
—	GK	GRE	Vangelis Pourliotopoulos
—	DF	GRE	Alexis Alexiou (captain)
—	DF	GRE	Kostas Malioufas
—	DF	GRE	Makis Chavos
—	DF	GRE	Dimitrios Kapetanopoulos
—	DF	GRE	Nikos Panagiotidis
—	DF	GRE	Giannis Voltezos
—	MF	GRE	Kostas Lagonidis
—	MF	GRE	Theodoros Zagorakis
—	MF	GRE	Giorgos Toursounidis

No.	Pos.	Nation	Player
—	MF	NED	Frans van Rooy
—	MF	CRO	Goran Milanko
—	MF	GRE	Achilleas Zafiriou
—	MF	GRE	Giannis Antonas
—	MF	GRE	Kostas Oikonomidis
—	MF	GRE	Nikos Plitsis
—	FW	POL	Krzysztof Bociek
—	FW	AUS	John Anastasiadis
—	FW	GRE	Paraschos Zouboulis
—	FW	GRE	Pavlos Dermitzakis
—	FW	GRE	Antonis Gioukoudis
—	FW	GRE	Aris Karasavvidis

== Transfers ==
Players transferred in

Transfer Window	Pos.	Name	Club	Fee
Summer	MF	(Greece) Achilleas Zafiriou	(Greece) Kastoria	?
Summer	MF	(Croatia) Goran Milanko	(Portugal) Famalicão	Free
Summer	FW	(Greece) Paraschos Zouboulis	(Greece) Edessaikos	30 million Dr.
Summer	FW	(Poland) Krzysztof Bociek	(Poland) Stal Mielec	700.000 DM
Winter	MF	(Netherlands) Frans van Rooy	(Belgium) Standard Liège	?

Players transferred out

Transfer Window	Pos.	Name	Club	Fee
Summer	DF	(Greece) Kostas Iliadis		Retired
Summer	MF	(Greece) Vangelis Kalfadopoulos	?	Free
Summer	FW	(Greece) Stefanos Borbokis	(Greece) Edessaikos	Free
Summer	FW	(Slovakia) Milan Luhový	(Belgium) Sint-Truiden	Free
Summer	FW	(Romania) Gheorghe Ceaușilă	(Romania) Dinamo București	Free

== Pre-season ==
Win Draw Loss

21 July 1994 Friendly	Lieg	0–0	PAOK	Germany

22 July 1994 Friendly	FC Aarau	4–0	PAOK	Germany
	Ratinho 4'; Pavličević 13'; Fink 32'; Bader 89'

23 July 1994 Friendly	SpVgg Ludwigsburg	2–3	PAOK	Germany
	Granić 17' (pen.); Scheiffele 84'		Kapetanopoulos 49'; Zagorakis 53'; Toursounidis 66'

24 July 1994 Friendly	Lieg	0–2	PAOK	Germany
			Karasavvidis 9'; Dermitzakis 65'

27 July 1994 Friendly	VfB Stuttgart	1–0	PAOK	Germany
	Addo 85'

29 July 1994 Friendly	Buchenberg	0–12	PAOK	Germany
			Dermitzakis 5'; Antonas 16'; Karasavvidis 20'; Chavos 36'; Milanko 56', 63'; Toursounidis 58', 80'; Zouboulis 65', 87'; Kapetanopoulos 67'; Zagorakis 74'

30 July 1994 Friendly	Wolterdingen	1–15	PAOK	Germany
	Uwe 80' (pen.)		Zouboulis 1'; Karasavvidis 4', 18'; Milanko 27'; Toursounidis 36', 56', 60' (penalty missed) 66' 68'; Antonas 63'; Lagonidis 69', 76'; Plitsis 73'; Dermitzakis 75', 84'; Anastasiadis 89'

2 August 1994 Friendly	Nürnberg	2–0	PAOK	Germany
	Criens 15'; Böhme 85'

8 August 1994 Friendly	PAOK	3–0	Iraklis	Thessaloniki
	Gioukoudis 56'; Zouboulis 70', 80'			Stadium: Toumba Stadium; Attendance: 7,240

12 August 1994 Friendly	AEL	1–1	PAOK	Larissa
	Stoica 75'		Karasavvidis 81'	Stadium: Alcazar Stadium; Referee: Latsios

14 August 1994 Friendly	Edessaikos	0–1	PAOK	Giannitsa
			Anastasiadis 5'	Referee: Plevritis

16 August 1994 Friendly	PAOK	1–1	Apollon Kalamaria	Thessaloniki
	Zagorakis 41'		Dermentzoglou 79'	Stadium: Toumba Stadium; Referee: Plevritis

19 August 1994 Friendly	PAOK	3–0	Kastoria	Thessaloniki
	Kapetanopoulos 40'; Bociek 45'; Zouboulis 57'			Stadium: Toumba Stadium; Referee: Abatzis

== Competitions ==
=== Overview ===
Competition	Record							
Competition	Pld	W	D	L	GF	GA	GD	Win %
Alpha Ethniki	34	20	5	9	55	29	+26	58.82
Greek Cup	5	3	2	0	10	3	+7	60.00
Total	39	23	7	9	65	32	+33	58.97

Source: Competitions

== Alpha Ethniki ==
=== Standings ===
Pos	Team	Pld	W	D	L	GF	GA	GD	Pts	Qualification or relegation
1	Panathinaikos (C)	34	26	5	3	83	21	+62	83	Qualification for Champions League qualifying round
2	Olympiacos	34	20	7	7	69	31	+38	67	Qualification for UEFA Cup preliminary round
3	PAOK	34	20	5	9	55	29	+26	65	One-year ban from European competitions (Note: On 1 October 1992, PAOK vs Paris Saint-Germain UEFA Cup match was abandoned due to crowd violence and PAOK were punished with a two-year ban from all European competitions by the UEFA disciplinary committee. The sentence was later reduced to one year.)
4	Apollon Athens	34	20	3	11	61	37	+24	63	Qualification for UEFA Cup preliminary round
5	AEK Athens	34	17	11	6	61	33	+28	62	Qualification for Cup Winners' Cup first round (Note: Since Panathinaikos who were the 1994–95 Greek Football Cup winner, were qualified for the 1995–96 UEFA Champions League, the runner-up, AEK Athens took their place in the first round of the 1995–96 UEFA Cup Winners' Cup.)

Source: RSSSF
Rules for classification: 1st points; 2nd head-to-head points; 3rd head-to-head goal difference; 4th decision match.
(C) Champions

==== Results summary ====
Overall								Home						Away					
Pld	W	D	L	GF	GA	GD	Pts	W	D	L	GF	GA	GD	W	D	L	GF	GA	GD
34	20	5	9	55	29	+26	65	13	4	0	34	3	+31	7	1	9	21	26	−5

Last updated: 4 June 1995.
Source: Competitive matches

==== Results by round ====
Round	1	2	3	4	5	6	7	8	9	10	11	12	13	14	15	16	17	18	19	20	21	22	23	24	25	26	27	28	29	30	31	32	33	34
Ground	H	H	A	H	A	H	A	H	A	H	A	A	H	A	A	H	H	A	A	H	A	H	A	H	A	H	H	A	H	A	H	A	H	A
Result	W	W	L	W	W	D	L	W	L	W	W	D	D	L	L	W	W	W	L	D	L	D	W	W	L	W	W	W	W	L	W	W	W	W
Position	2	1	5	3	2	2	4	3	3	3	3	3	4	5	4	4	4	4	4	5	6	7	7	6	6	6	5	4	4	5	5	4	3	3

Source: League matches
A = Away; H = Home; W = Win; D = Draw; L = Loss

• Matches are in chronological order

==== Matches ====
Win Draw Loss

27 August 1994 1	PAOK	4–0	Kavala	Thessaloniki
	Lagonidis 16' (pen.); Milanko 36'; Bociek 55'; Zouboulis 88'			Stadium: Toumba Stadium; Attendance: 10,307; Referee: Lefakis

11 September 1994 2	PAOK	2–0	Xanthi	Thessaloniki
	Zouboulis 28'; Bociek 43'			Stadium: Toumba Stadium; Attendance: 11,608

18 September 1994 3	AEK Athens	4–3	PAOK	Athens
	Saravakos 5' (pen.), 45'; Kostis 52', 56'		Kapetanopoulos 61'; Zouboulis 79'; Lagonidis 86' (pen.)	Stadium: Nikos Goumas Stadium; Attendance: 11,517; Referee: Asteris

25 September 1994 4	PAOK	4–0	Ethnikos Piraeus	Thessaloniki
	Zagorakis 39'; Zouboulis 58', 81'; Kapetanopoulos 76'			Stadium: Toumba Stadium; Attendance: 13,135

2 October 1994 5	Iraklis	1–2	PAOK	Thessaloniki
	Jovanović 89'		Zagorakis 36'; Lagonidis 86' (pen.)	Stadium: Kaftanzoglio Stadium; Attendance: 22,731; Referee: Plevritis

26 October 1994 6	PAOK	0–0	Levadiakos	Thessaloniki
			Bletsas (red card) 27'	Stadium: Toumba Stadium; Attendance: 9,243; Referee: Giannopoulos

30 October 1994 7	Panathinaikos	3–0	PAOK	Athens
	Marangos 15', 51'; Christodoulou 45' (pen.)			Stadium: Athens Olympic Stadium; Attendance: 22,883; Referee: Charlavanis

6 November 1994 8	PAOK	3–0	Olympiacos	Thessaloniki
	Bociek 8', 32'; Lagonidis (yellow card) 43' (yellow-red card) 45'; Kapetanopoulos 52'			Stadium: Toumba Stadium; Attendance: 26,404; Referee: Giannopoulos

27 November 1994 10	Panionios	3–1	PAOK	Athens
	Pantić 33', 51'; Nalitzis 90+1'		Bociek 49'; Kapetanopoulos (red card) 53'	Stadium: Nea Smyrni Stadium; Attendance: 2,470; Referee: Konstantinidis

4 December 1994 11	PAOK	5–0	AEL	Thessaloniki
	Zafiriou 7'; Zagorakis 19'; Tziotzios 36' (o.g.); Zouboulis 74'; Karasavvidis 76'			Stadium: Toumba Stadium

7 December 1994 9	Aris	0–4	PAOK	Thessaloniki
			Toursounidis 22', 57'; Lagonidis 61'; Bociek 90+2'	Stadium: Kleanthis Vikelidis Stadium; Attendance: 3,587; Referee: Vellios
Note: Match was initially scheduled on 20 November, but was postponed due to crowd violence.

11 December 1994 12	Doxa Drama	0–0	PAOK	Drama
	Vasilakakis (red card) 63'		Zagorakis (red card) 72'	Stadium: Doxa Drama Stadium; Attendance: 5,144; Referee: Psychomanis

28 December 1994 13	PAOK	1–1	Apollon Athens	Thessaloniki
	Ioannou 22' (o.g.); Lagonidis (penalty missed) 60'		Nikolaidis 27'; Kefalas (red card) 51'	Stadium: Toumba Stadium; Attendance: 4,690; Referee: Chatzistavridis

8 January 1995 14	Edessaikos	2–0	PAOK	Edessa
	Čolaković 24', 86'			Stadium: Municipal Stadium of Edessa; Referee: Vorgias

22 January 1995 16	OFI	2–1	PAOK	Heraklion
	Frantzeskos 18', 54'		Karasavvidis 44'	Stadium: Theodoros Vardinogiannis Stadium; Attendance: 3,220; Referee: Zachilas

29 January 1995 17	PAOK	2–0	Athinaikos	Thessaloniki
	van Rooy 60' (pen.), 69'			Stadium: Toumba Stadium; Attendance: 3,385; Referee: Chatzis

1 February 1995 15	PAOK	2–0	Ionikos	Thessaloniki
	van Rooy 55' (pen.); Bociek 83'		Antić (red card) 60'	Stadium: Toumba Stadium; Attendance: 2,007; Referee: Kalogiannakis
Note: Match was initially scheduled on 15 January, but was postponed because of snow.

5 February 1995 18	Kavala	0–1	PAOK	Kavala
			Bociek 72'	Stadium: Anthi Karagianni Stadium; Attendance: 3,110; Referee: Kotsaris

12 February 1995 19	Xanthi	3–0	PAOK	Xanthi
	Marcelo 18'; Vilanakis 45'; Zikos (red card) 80'; Tengelidis 85'; Karageorgiou (red card) 89'		Panagiotidis (red card) 45'	Stadium: Xanthi Ground; Attendance: 7,189; Referee: Psychomanis

19 February 1995 20	PAOK	1–1	AEK Athens	Thessaloniki
	van Rooy 53'		Kostis 28'	Stadium: Toumba Stadium; Attendance: 13,509; Referee: Papadakos

26 February 1995 21	Ethnikos Piraeus	3–1	PAOK	Piraeus
	Jovičić 12'; Niniadis 34'; Kamitsis 80'		Lagonidis 32'	Stadium: Karaiskakis Stadium; Attendance: 813; Referee: Papapetrou

5 March 1995 22	PAOK	0–0	Iraklis	Thessaloniki
				Stadium: Toumba Stadium; Attendance: 5,305; Referee: Spaneas

12 March 1995 23	Levadiakos	0–1	PAOK	Livadeia
			Gioukoudis 25'	Stadium: Levadia Municipal Stadium; Attendance: 1,190

19 March 1995 24	PAOK	2–0	Panathinaikos	Thessaloniki
	Lagonidis 7'; Alexiou 44'			Stadium: Toumba Stadium; Attendance: 21,114

26 March 1995 25	Olympiacos	2–0	PAOK	Piraeus
	Batista 74'; Karapialis 86'			Stadium: Karaiskakis Stadium; Attendance: 16,497; Referee: Kalogiannakis

2 April 1995 26	PAOK	2–0	Aris	Thessaloniki
	Zouboulis 16', 37'			Stadium: Toumba Stadium; Attendance: 19,374; Referee: Fasolis

9 April 1995 27	PAOK	2–0	Panionios	Thessaloniki
	Anastasiadis 16'; Zagorakis 45'			Stadium: Toumba Stadium; Attendance: 4,475

16 April 1995 28	AEL	0–2	PAOK	Larissa
			Anastasiadis 15'; Kapetanopoulos 25'	Stadium: Alcazar Stadium; Referee: Giannopoulos

30 April 1995 29	PAOK	1–0	Doxa Drama	Thessaloniki
	Zouboulis 43'			Stadium: Toumba Stadium; Attendance: 3,264; Referee: Papapetrou

10 May 1995 30	Apollon Athens	2–1	PAOK	Athens
	Ioannou 39'; Velentzas 59' (pen.) (red card) 90'		Alexiou 32'	Stadium: Rizoupoli Stadium; Attendance: 2,766; Referee: Kalathenos

14 May 1995 31	PAOK	2–1	Edessaikos	Thessaloniki
	van Rooy 26' (pen.), 43'		Papadopoulos 44'	Stadium: Toumba Stadium; Attendance: 3,249; Referee: Mintiouris

21 May 1995 32	Ionikos	0–2	PAOK	Piraeus
			Zafiriou 57'; Anastasiadis 79'	Stadium: Neapoli Stadium; Attendance: 1,968; Referee: Chatzis

28 May 1995 33	PAOK	1–0	OFI	Thessaloniki
	van Rooy 55' (pen.)			Stadium: Toumba Stadium; Attendance: 8,727; Referee: Kefalas

4 June 1995 34	Athinaikos	1–2	PAOK	Athens
	Dabić 84'; Christinakis (red card) 88'		Toursounidis 17'; Kapetanopoulos 24'	Stadium: Vyronas National Stadium; Attendance: 1,667; Referee: Nikakis

== Greek Cup ==
=== First round (group stage) ===
24 August 1994	PAOK	3–0	Apollon Krya Vrysi	Thessaloniki
	Gioukoudis 13'; Milanko 26'; Alexiou 33'			Stadium: Toumba Stadium; Attendance: 1,019; Referee: Bentas

31 August 1994	Eordaikos	0–1	PAOK	Ptolemaida
			Milanko 24'	Stadium: Ptolemaida Municipal Stadium; Referee: Ntoutsias

14 September 1994	Acheron Kanalaki	2–5	PAOK	Preveza
	Kyriakidis 15'; Ziakas 71'		Antonas 42'; Oikonomidis 53'; Chavos 55'; Dermitzakis 62', 89'	Referee: Nikakis

=== Second round ===
9 November 1994 1st leg	PAOK	1–1	Agios Nikolaos	Thessaloniki
	Zouboulis 77'; Toursounidis (penalty missed) 78'		Inneh 89'	Stadium: Toumba Stadium; Attendance: 383; Referee: Mintiouris

30 November 1994 2nd leg	Agios Nikolaos	0–0 (1–1 (a) agg.)	PAOK	Agios Nikolaos
	Tsimbos (red card) 30'

== Statistics ==
=== Squad statistics ===
As of June 4, 1995

Appearances denote players in the starting lineup, with the numbers in parentheses denoting appearances as substitute.

No.	Name	Alpha Ethniki		Greek Cup		Total	
No.	Name	Apps	Goals	Apps	Goals	Apps	Goals
Goalkeepers
	(Greece) Nikolaos Michopoulos	29	0	3	0	32	0
	(Greece) Vangelis Pourliotopoulos	5	0	2	0	7	0
Defenders
	(Greece) Alexis Alexiou	33	2	5	1	38	3
	(Greece) Dimitrios Kapetanopoulos	27	5	3	0	30	5
	(Greece) Makis Chavos	22	0	4	1	26	1
	(Greece) Nikos Panagiotidis	13	0	3	0	16	0
	(Greece) Kostas Malioufas	2	0	2	0	4	0
	(Greece) Giannis Voltezos	1	0	1	0	2	0
Midfielders
	(Greece) Achilleas Zafiriou	33	2	4	0	37	2
	(Greece) Theodoros Zagorakis	31	4	4	0	35	4
	(Greece) Kostas Lagonidis	31	6	3	0	34	6
	(Greece) Giorgos Toursounidis	30	3	4	0	34	3
	(Netherlands) Frans van Rooy	21	7	0	0	21	7
	(Croatia) Goran Milanko	14	1	2	2	16	3
	(Greece) Giannis Antonas	13	0	3	1	16	1
	(Greece) Kostas Oikonomidis	4	0	2	1	6	1
	(Greece) Nikos Plitsis	0	0	1	0	1	0
Forwards
	(Greece) Antonis Gioukoudis	33	1	4	1	37	2
	(Greece) Paraschos Zouboulis	30	9	2	1	32	10
	(Poland) Krzysztof Bociek	27	8	3	0	30	8
	(Australia) John Anastasiadis	17	3	2	0	19	3
	(Greece) Aris Karasavvidis	12	2	3	0	15	2
	(Greece) Pavlos Dermitzakis	4	0	4	2	8	2

Source: Match reports in competitive matches, RSSSF

=== Goalscorers ===
Rank	No.	Pos.	Player	Alpha Ethniki	Greek Cup	Total
1		FW	(Greece) Paraschos Zouboulis	9	1	10
2		FW	(Poland) Krzysztof Bociek	8	0	8
3		MF	(Netherlands) Frans van Rooy	7	0	7
4		MF	(Greece) Kostas Lagonidis	6	0	6
5		DF	(Greece) Dimitrios Kapetanopoulos	5	0	5
6		MF	(Greece) Theodoros Zagorakis	4	0	4
7		MF	(Greece) Giorgos Toursounidis	3	0	3
7		FW	(Australia) John Anastasiadis	3	0	3
7		DF	(Greece) Alexis Alexiou	2	1	3
7		MF	(Croatia) Goran Milanko	1	2	3
11		MF	(Greece) Achilleas Zafiriou	2	0	2
11		FW	(Greece) Aris Karasavvidis	2	0	2
11		FW	(Greece) Antonis Gioukoudis	1	1	2
11		FW	(Greece) Pavlos Dermitzakis	0	2	2
15		DF	(Greece) Makis Chavos	0	1	1
15		MF	(Greece) Giannis Antonas	0	1	1
15		MF	(Greece) Kostas Oikonomidis	0	1	1
Own goals				2	0	2
TOTALS				55	10	65

Source: Match reports in competitive matches, RSSSF
