= 1995–96 PAOK FC season =

PAOK
1995–96 season
- President: Thomas Voulinos; Giorgos Kalyvas
- Manager: Arie Haan; Stavros Sarafis; Dragan Kokotović; Michalis Bellis; Gunder Bengtsson
- Stadium: Toumba Stadium
- Alpha Ethniki: 14th
- Greek Cup: Semi-finals
- Top goalscorer: League: Paraschos Zouboulis (13); All: Paraschos Zouboulis (18)
- Highest home attendance: 15,995 vs Aris

The 1995–96 season was PAOK Football Club's 69th in existence and the club's 37th consecutive season in the top flight of Greek football. The team entered the Greek Football Cup in first round.

== Players ==
=== Squad ===
Note: Flags indicate national team as defined under FIFA eligibility rules; some limited exceptions apply. Players may hold more than one non-FIFA nationality.

No.	Pos.	Nation	Player
—	GK	GRE	Nikolaos Michopoulos
—	GK	GRE	Vangelis Pourliotopoulos
—	GK	GRE	Asterios Themelis
—	DF	GRE	Alexis Alexiou (captain)
—	DF	GRE	Makis Chavos
—	DF	GRE	Dimitrios Kapetanopoulos
—	DF	GRE	Nikos Panagiotidis
—	DF	GRE	Giannis Voltezos
—	DF	GRE	Giorgos Koumaropoulos
—	DF	GRE	Giannis Tsoraklidis
—	MF	GRE	Theodoros Zagorakis
—	MF	GRE	Giorgos Toursounidis
—	MF	GRE	Achilleas Zafiriou

No.	Pos.	Nation	Player
—	MF	NED	Maurice van Ham
—	MF	DEN	Jesper Johansen
—	MF	GRE	Giannis Antonas
—	MF	GRE	Giotis Tsalouchidis
—	MF	GRE	Kostas Lagonidis
—	MF	YUG	Goran Aleksić
—	FW	GRE	Paraschos Zouboulis
—	FW	GRE	Antonis Gioukoudis
—	FW	AUS	John Anastasiadis
—	FW	ENG	Micky Quinn
—	FW	GRE	Dimitris Nolis
—	FW	YUG	Miroslav Jović

== Transfers ==
Players transferred in

Transfer Window	Pos.	Name	Club	Fee
Summer	GK	(Greece) Asterios Themelis	(Greece) AE Krini Thessaloniki	?
Summer	DF	(Greece) Giorgos Koumaropoulos	(Greece) PAOK U20	
Summer	DF	(Greece) Giannis Tsoraklidis	(Greece) PAOK U20	
Summer	MF	(Greece) Giotis Tsalouchidis	(Greece) Olympiacos	Free
Summer	MF	(Netherlands) Maurice van Ham	(Belgium) Beveren	Loan
Summer	MF	(Denmark) Jesper Johansen	(Denmark) BK Avarta	Free
Summer	FW	(England) Micky Quinn	(England) Coventry	Free
Summer	FW	(Greece) Dimitris Nolis	(Greece) Apollon Kalamaria	?
Winter	MF	(Federal Republic of Yugoslavia) Goran Aleksić	(Federal Republic of Yugoslavia) Radnički Beograd	?
Winter	FW	(Federal Republic of Yugoslavia) Miroslav Jović	(Federal Republic of Yugoslavia) Rad	?

Players transferred out

Transfer Window	Pos.	Name	Club	Fee
Summer	DF	(Greece) Kostas Malioufas	(Greece) Trikala	Free
Summer	MF	(Greece) Nikos Plitsis	(Greece) Panachaiki	Free
Summer	MF	(Greece) Kostas Oikonomidis	(Greece) Edessaikos	Free
Summer	MF	(Croatia) Goran Milanko	(Germany) Chemnitzer FC	Free
Summer	MF	(Netherlands) Frans van Rooy	(Belgium) Westerlo	Free
Summer	FW	(Poland) Krzysztof Bociek	(Poland) Stal Mielec	Free
Summer	FW	(Greece) Aris Karasavvidis	(Greece) Trikala	Free
Winter	MF	(Greece) Kostas Lagonidis	(Greece) Iraklis	Free
Winter	FW	(England) Micky Quinn		Retired

== Pre-season ==
Win Draw Loss

22 July 1995 Friendly	Frittlingen	1–4	PAOK	Germany
			Antonas; Zafiriou; Quinn; Tsalouchidis

23 July 1995 Friendly	TSV Meitingen	0–2	PAOK	Germany
			Anastasiadis 60'; Zouboulis 65'

25 July 1995 Friendly	VfB Stuttgart	5–1	PAOK	Germany
	Bobic 15', 34', 48'; Élber 32', 45'		Zouboulis 87'

27 July 1995 Friendly	Sportfreunde Siegen	1–2	PAOK	Germany
			Zouboulis 25'; Zagorakis 35'

29 July 1995 Friendly	SpVgg Renningen	0–6	PAOK	Germany
			Zouboulis; Toursounidis; Zagorakis; Tsalouchidis

31 July 1995 Friendly	Palingen	2–4	PAOK	Germany
			Zouboulis van Ham; Tsoraklidis; Toursounidis

2 August 1995 Friendly	Frauenfeld	0–2	PAOK	Germany
			Zouboulis; Toursounidis

3 August 1995 Friendly	VfR Engen	0–8	PAOK	Germany
			Zouboulis; Toursounidis; Kapetanopoulos; Chavos; Lagonidis; Antonas; Anastasiadis

4 August 1995 Friendly	Saulgau	0–6	PAOK	Germany

6 August 1995 Friendly	Esslingen	2–4	PAOK	Germany
			Nolis; Anastasiadis; Antonas; Toursounidis

8 August 1995 Friendly	TSV 1860 Munich	2–1	PAOK	Germany
	Nowak 15'; Leśniak 88'		Voltezos 89'

10 August 1995 Friendly	PAOK	0–0	AEL	Thessaloniki
				Stadium: Toumba Stadium

17 August 1995 Friendly	PAOK	5–3	Iraklis	Thessaloniki
	Zouboulis 5', 13'; Alexiou 40'; Kapetanopoulos 62'; Quinn 81'		Jovanović 24'; Mirtsekis 32'; Mebounou 74'	Stadium: Toumba Stadium; Referee: Chalkidikiotis

20 August 1995 Friendly	PAOK	5–2	Anagennisi Karditsa	Thessaloniki
	Zouboulis 10'; Tsalouchidis 30'; Antonas 36'; Gioukoudis 43' (pen.); Nolis 77'		Karalidis 6'; Spatharas 61'	Stadium: Toumba Stadium; Referee: Aggelakis

== Competitions ==
=== Overview ===
Competition	Record							
Competition	Pld	W	D	L	GF	GA	GD	Win %
Alpha Ethniki	34	10	11	13	42	46	−4	29.41
Greek Cup	12	10	1	1	28	6	+22	83.33
Total	46	20	12	14	70	52	+18	43.48

Source: Competitions

=== Managerial statistics ===
Head coach	From	To	Record							
Head coach	From	To	G	W	D	L	GF	GA	GD	Win %
(Netherlands) Arie Haan	Start of season	01.10.1995	6	3	2	1	8	5	+3	50.00
(Greece) Stavros Sarafis (Interim)	04.10.1995	26.11.1995	9	4	3	2	15	8	+7	44.44
(Federal Republic of Yugoslavia) Dragan Kokotović	29.11.1995	04.02.1996	13	6	2	5	23	15	+8	46.15
(Greece) Michalis Bellis	11.02.1996	05.05.1996	14	5	4	5	15	18	−3	35.71
(Sweden) Gunder Bengtsson	12.05.1996	End of season	4	2	1	1	9	6	+3	50.00

== Alpha Ethniki ==
=== Standings ===
Pos	Team	Pld	W	D	L	GF	GA	GD	Pts	Qualification or relegation
12	Paniliakos	34	10	10	14	46	51	−5	40 (Note: Head-to-head points (goal difference): Apollon Athens 3 (0), Paniliakos 3 (0).)	
13	Kalamata	34	9	12	13	41	46	−5	39	
14	PAOK (Note: PAOK were deducted 3 points.)	34	10	11	13	42	46	−4	38	
15	Panachaiki	34	10	6	18	27	47	−20	36	
16	AEL (R)	34	9	7	18	32	64	−32	34	Relegation to Beta Ethniki

Source: RSSSF
Rules for classification: 1st points; 2nd head-to-head points; 3rd head-to-head goal difference; 4th decision match.
(R) Relegated

==== Results summary ====
Overall								Home						Away					
Pld	W	D	L	GF	GA	GD	Pts	W	D	L	GF	GA	GD	W	D	L	GF	GA	GD
34	10	11	13	42	46	−4	41	8	4	5	23	17	+6	2	7	8	19	29	−10

Last updated: 29 May 1996.
Source: Competitive matches

==== Results by round ====
Round	1	2	3	4	5	6	7	8	9	10	11	12	13	14	15	16	17	18	19	20	21	22	23	24	25	26	27	28	29	30	31	32	33	34
Ground	A	H	A	A	H	A	H	A	H	A	H	H	A	H	A	H	A	H	A	H	H	A	H	A	H	A	H	A	A	H	A	H	A	H
Result	D	W	L	D	W	L	W	D	L	D	D	D	L	W	L	L	L	D	L	W	W	D	W	W	L	L	D	L	D	L	W	W	D	L
Position	8	6	10	9	7	10	8	7	14	14	14	14	14	14	15	16	16	15	15	15	15	15	12	10	12	12	13	13	14	14	14	12	14	14

Source: League matches
A = Away; H = Home; W = Win; D = Draw; L = Loss

==== Matches ====
Win Draw Loss

27 August 1995 1	Xanthi	2–2	PAOK	Xanthi
	Zekeridis 60'; Záleský 65'		Gioukoudis 48' (pen.); Lagonidis 90'	Stadium: Xanthi Ground; Attendance: 11,764; Referee: Fasolis

10 September 1995 2	PAOK	1–0	Athinaikos	Thessaloniki
	Zotalis 70' (o.g.)			Stadium: Toumba Stadium; Attendance: 14,607; Referee: Papatriantafyllou

17 September 1995 3	Panionios	2–1	PAOK	Athens
	Predatu 80'; Sapountzis 81'		Anastasiadis 34'	Stadium: Nea Smyrni Stadium; Attendance: 2,982; Referee: Vellios

24 September 1995 4	Paniliakos	1–1	PAOK	Pyrgos
	Armylagos 84'		Lagonidis 90'	Stadium: Pyrgos Stadium; Attendance: 6,064; Referee: Zacheilas

1 October 1995 5	PAOK	1–0	Aris	Thessaloniki
	Zouboulis 3'			Stadium: Toumba Stadium; Attendance: 15,995; Referee: Psychomanis

15 October 1995 6	Panachaiki	3–2	PAOK	Patras
	Karipov 32'; Georgatos 60'; Kyriakopoulos 90'		Zouboulis 30' van Ham (red card) 49'; Anastasiadis 81'	Stadium: Kostas Davourlis Stadium; Referee: Vellios

22 October 1995 7	PAOK	2–0	Ethnikos Piraeus	Thessaloniki
	Zouboulis 31'; Tsalouchidis 67'			Stadium: Toumba Stadium; Attendance: 2,360

29 October 1995 8	Iraklis	2–2	PAOK	Thessaloniki
	Borbokis 2'; Jovanović 55'		Lagonidis 66'; Quinn 82'	Stadium: Kaftanzoglio Stadium; Attendance: 8,673

6 November 1995 9	PAOK	1–3	AEK Athens	Thessaloniki
	Zouboulis 9'		Tsiartas 33'; Ketsbaia 45'; Kostis 61'	Stadium: Toumba Stadium; Attendance: 7,946; Referee: Vellios
Note: Match abandoned after 73 mins due to crowd violence, result remained. PAOK were sentenced with a 3pt deduction and a 5 home games stadium ban by court decision.

19 November 1995 10	Ionikos	0–0	PAOK	Piraeus
				Stadium: Neapoli Stadium; Attendance: 1,809; Referee: Papatriantafyllou

26 November 1995 11	PAOK	0–0	Olympiacos	Trikala
			Kalantzis (red card) 87'	Stadium: Trikala Municipal Stadium; Attendance: 6,699; Referee: Chatzis
Note: Game held at Trikala because PAOK had a stadium ban.

3 December 1995 12	PAOK	1–1	Kalamata	Livadeia
	Gioukoudis 10'		Hagan 81'	Stadium: Levadia Municipal Stadium; Attendance: 641; Referee: Mintiouris
Note: Game held at Livadeia because PAOK had a stadium ban.

10 December 1995 13	Panathinaikos	2–0	PAOK	Athens
	Borrelli 22'; Georgiadis 51'			Stadium: Athens Olympic Stadium; Attendance: 10,179; Referee: Kalathenos

17 December 1995 14	PAOK	2–1	Apollon Athens	Volos
	Kapetanopoulos 24'; Gioukoudis 51' (pen.); Zagorakis (red card) 56'		Xanthis (red card) 51'; Kola 64'	Stadium: Volos Municipal Stadium; Referee: Stefanopoulos
Note: Game held at Volos because PAOK had a stadium ban.

7 January 1996 15	OFI	2–1	PAOK	Heraklion
	Frantzeskos 41' (pen.), 62'		Gioukoudis 40' (pen.)	Stadium: Theodoros Vardinogiannis Stadium; Referee: Vorgias

14 January 1996 16	PAOK	0–1	Edessaikos	Thessaloniki
	Panagiotidis (red card) 7'		Kastaniotis 27'	Stadium: Toumba Stadium

21 January 1996 17	AEL	2–1	PAOK	Larissa
	Mitsibonas 42'; Embé 48'		Gioukoudis 61' (pen.)	Stadium: Alcazar Stadium; Attendance: 1,618; Referee: Kalathenos

27 January 1996 18	PAOK	3–3	Xanthi	Thessaloniki
	Jović 21'; Gioukoudis 31' (pen.); Kapetanopoulos 65'		Vryzas 41' (pen.); Vilanakis 53'; Zekeridis 75'	Stadium: Toumba Stadium; Attendance: 1,707; Referee: Vorgias

4 February 1996 19	Athinaikos	2–1	PAOK	Athens
	Alvertis 38'; Kaklamanos 79'		Alexiou (yellow card) 56' (yellow-red card) 62'; Tsalouchidis 71'	Stadium: Vyronas National Stadium; Attendance: 1,278; Referee: Mintiouris

11 February 1996 20	PAOK	2–0	Panionios	Thessaloniki
	Gioukoudis (penalty missed) 30'; Kapetanopoulos (red card) 45'; Zouboulis 65'; Tsalouchidis 77'		Kourbanas (red card) 45'	Stadium: Toumba Stadium; Attendance: 4,992

18 February 1996 21	PAOK	1–0	Paniliakos	Thessaloniki
	Zouboulis 1'			Stadium: Toumba Stadium; Attendance: 3,539; Referee: Fasolis

25 February 1996 22	Aris	0–0	PAOK	Thessaloniki
				Stadium: Kleanthis Vikelidis Stadium; Attendance: 6,978; Referee: Zachariadis

3 March 1996 23	PAOK	2–1	Panachaiki	Thessaloniki
	Anastasiadis 35'; Gioukoudis 44' (pen.)		Klejch 28'	Stadium: Toumba Stadium; Attendance: 3,687; Referee: Begos

10 March 1996 24	Ethnikos Piraeus	2–3	PAOK	Piraeus
	Anastasiou 26', 45'		Zouboulis 6'; Gioukoudis 62' (pen.); Alexiou 72'	Stadium: Karaiskakis Stadium; Attendance: 641

16 March 1996 25	PAOK	1–2	Iraklis	Thessaloniki
	Gioukoudis 35' (pen.)		Mirtsekis 65'; Lagonidis 81'	Stadium: Toumba Stadium; Attendance: 994; Referee: Latsios

23 March 1996 26	AEK Athens	4–0	PAOK	Athens
	Tsiartas 24' (pen.), 63'; Kostis 27', 66'			Stadium: Nikos Goumas Stadium; Attendance: 7,700; Referee: Giannadakis

31 March 1996 27	PAOK	1–1	Ionikos	Thessaloniki
	Zouboulis 21'		Xanthopoulos 1'	Stadium: Toumba Stadium; Attendance: 833

7 April 1996 28	Olympiacos	1–0	PAOK	Piraeus
	Karapialis 20'		Toursounidis (red card) 90'	Stadium: Karaiskakis Stadium; Attendance: 6,191; Referee: Pouflis

28 April 1996 29	Kalamata	1–1	PAOK	Kalamata
	Johnson 40'		Zouboulis 90'	Stadium: Kalamata Municipal Stadium; Attendance: 4,025; Referee: Pouflis

5 May 1996 30	PAOK	0–1	Panathinaikos	Thessaloniki
	Zagorakis (red card) 76'		Borrelli 43'	Stadium: Toumba Stadium; Attendance: 13,832; Referee: Begos

12 May 1996 31	Apollon Athens	0–1	PAOK	Athens
			Zouboulis 44' (red card) 77'	Stadium: Rizoupoli Stadium; Attendance: 1,186; Referee: Stefanopoulos

19 May 1996 32	PAOK	3–0	OFI	Thessaloniki
	Jović 65'; Anastasiadis 66'; Chavos 75' (red card) 84'		Mitić (red card) 84'	Stadium: Toumba Stadium; Attendance: 3,682; Referee: Asteris

26 May 1996 33	Edessaikos	3–3	PAOK	Edessa
	Kolev 2'; Andreadis 25' (pen.), 89' (pen.)		Zouboulis 24', 90+6'; Anastasiadis (red card) 68'; Antonas 73'; Alexiou (red card) 89'	Stadium: Municipal Stadium of Edessa; Attendance: 2,237; Referee: Fasolis

29 May 1996 34	PAOK	2–3	AEL	Thessaloniki
	Toursounidis 34'; Kapetanopoulos 64'		Embé 48'; Mitsibonas 68' (pen.); Tsakmakidis 87'	Stadium: Toumba Stadium; Attendance: 424; Referee: Chatzis

== Greek Cup ==
=== First round (group stage) ===
31 August 1995	Chania	0–2	PAOK	Chania
			Toursounidis 24'; Toninho 54' (o.g.)	Stadium: Perivolia Municipal Stadium; Referee: Vellios

4 October 1995	PAOK	5–0	Pierikos	Thessaloniki
	Toursounidis 16', 40'; Zouboulis 17'; Zagorakis 41'; Efthymiadis 86' (o.g.)			Stadium: Toumba Stadium; Attendance: 452

25 October 1995	Korinthos	0–2	PAOK	Corinth
	Palouzis (red card) 43'		Quinn 33'; Johansen 63'; Toursounidis (penalty missed) 79'	Stadium: Corinth Municipal Stadium; Referee: Zacheilas

22 November 1995	PAOK	1–0	Kozani	Ptolemaida
	Quinn 78'			Stadium: Ptolemaida Municipal Stadium
Note: Game held at Ptolemaida because PAOK had a stadium ban.

=== Second round ===
29 November 1995 1st leg	Fokikos	0–1	PAOK	Amfissa
			Gioukoudis 51' (pen.)	Stadium: Amfissa Municipal Stadium; Attendance: 376; Referee: Begos

13 December 1995 2nd leg	PAOK	5–0 (6–0 agg.)	Fokikos	Volos
	Gioukoudis 49' (pen.); Toursounidis 57'; Nolis 59', 78'; Zouboulis 73'			Stadium: Volos Municipal Stadium; Attendance: 49; Referee: Papatriantafyllou
Note: Game held at Volos because PAOK had a stadium ban.

=== Third round ===
3 January 1996 1st leg	PAOK	4–1	Ionikos	Thessaloniki
	Nolis 18'; Zagorakis 51'; Anastasiadis 64'; Zouboulis 66'		Daraklitsas 58'	Stadium: Toumba Stadium; Attendance: 621

17 January 1996 2nd leg	Ionikos	0–1 (1–5 agg.)	PAOK	Piraeus
	Novokhatsky (penalty missed) 55'; Gribilas (penalty missed) 73'		Zouboulis 25'	Stadium: Neapoli Stadium; Referee: Papapetrou

=== Quarter-finals ===
31 January 1996 1st leg	PAOK	3–0	Trikala	Thessaloniki
	Kapetanopoulos 68' (pen.); Nolis 75', 88'			Stadium: Toumba Stadium; Referee: Vlachos

14 February 1996 2nd leg	Trikala	1–2 (1–5 agg.)	PAOK	Trikala
	Karaiskos 77'		Jović 54'; Zouboulis 57'	Stadium: Trikala Municipal Stadium; Attendance: 1,232

=== Semi-finals ===
28 February 1996 1st leg	Apollon Athens	1–1	PAOK	Athens
	Nikolaidis 58'		Alexiou 12'	Stadium: Rizoupoli Stadium; Referee: Papatriantafyllou

13 March 1996 2nd leg	PAOK	1–3 (2–4 agg.)	Apollon Athens	Thessaloniki
	Gioukoudis 40' (pen.)		Kola 24'; Nikolaidis 67', 75'	Stadium: Toumba Stadium; Referee: Latsios

== Statistics ==
=== Squad statistics ===
As of May 29, 1996

Appearances denote players in the starting lineup, with the numbers in parentheses denoting appearances as substitute.

No.	Name	Alpha Ethniki		Greek Cup		Total	
No.	Name	Apps	Goals	Apps	Goals	Apps	Goals
Goalkeepers
	(Greece) Nikolaos Michopoulos	32	0	10	0	42	0
	(Greece) Vangelis Pourliotopoulos	2	0	2	0	4	0
Defenders
	(Greece) Makis Chavos	29	1	11	0	40	1
	(Greece) Alexis Alexiou	29	1	10	1	39	2
	(Greece) Dimitrios Kapetanopoulos	28	3	8	1	36	4
	(Greece) Nikos Panagiotidis	14	0	6	0	20	0
	(Greece) Giannis Voltezos	7	0	5	0	12	0
	(Greece) Giorgos Koumaropoulos	3	0	1	0	4	0
	(Greece) Giannis Tsoraklidis	0	0	1	0	1	0
Midfielders
	(Greece) Giorgos Toursounidis	33	1	10	4	43	5
	(Greece) Achilleas Zafiriou	29	0	10	0	39	0
	(Greece) Giotis Tsalouchidis	29	3	8	0	37	3
	(Greece) Theodoros Zagorakis	26	0	7	2	33	2
	(Netherlands) Maurice van Ham	23	0	7	0	30	0
	(Greece) Giannis Antonas	15	1	7	0	22	1
	(Denmark) Jesper Johansen	13	0	5	1	18	1
	(Greece) Kostas Lagonidis	11	3	3	0	14	3
	(Federal Republic of Yugoslavia) Goran Aleksić	8	0	3	0	11	0
Forwards
	(Greece) Antonis Gioukoudis	29	9	12	3	41	12
	(Australia) John Anastasiadis	30	3	11	1	41	4
	(Greece) Paraschos Zouboulis	31	13	9	5	40	18
	(Greece) Dimitris Nolis	17	0	9	5	26	5
	(Federal Republic of Yugoslavia) Miroslav Jović	12	2	4	1	16	3
	(England) Micky Quinn	9	1	4	2	13	3

Source: Match reports in competitive matches, RSSSF

=== Goalscorers ===
Rank	No.	Pos.	Player	Alpha Ethniki	Greek Cup	Total
1		FW	(Greece) Paraschos Zouboulis	13	5	18
2		FW	(Greece) Antonis Gioukoudis	9	3	12
3		MF	(Greece) Giorgos Toursounidis	1	4	5
3		FW	(Greece) Dimitris Nolis	0	5	5
5		DF	(Greece) Dimitrios Kapetanopoulos	3	1	4
5		FW	(Australia) John Anastasiadis	3	1	4
7		MF	(Greece) Giotis Tsalouchidis	3	0	3
7		MF	(Greece) Kostas Lagonidis	3	0	3
7		FW	(Federal Republic of Yugoslavia) Miroslav Jović	2	1	3
7		FW	(England) Micky Quinn	1	2	3
11		DF	(Greece) Alexis Alexiou	1	1	2
11		MF	(Greece) Theodoros Zagorakis	0	2	2
13		DF	(Greece) Makis Chavos	1	0	1
13		MF	(Greece) Giannis Antonas	1	0	1
13		MF	(Denmark) Jesper Johansen	0	1	1
Own goals				1	2	3
TOTALS				42	28	70

Source: Match reports in competitive matches, RSSSF
