= Derby of Thessaloniki =

Club football rivalry in Thessaloniki, Greece

- Other names: Derby of Northern Greece; Derby of Macedonia
- Location: Thessaloniki, Greece
- Teams: Aris; PAOK
- First meeting: 12 June 1927; MFCA Championship; PAOK 2–1 Aris
- Latest meeting: 13 September 2026; Super League Greece; PAOK 2–0 Aris
- Next meeting: 10 January 2027; Super League Greece; Aris – PAOK
- Stadiums: Charilaou Stadium (Aris); Toumba Stadium (PAOK)

Statistics
- Total meetings: 229
- Most wins: PAOK (81)
- Most player appearances: Giorgos Koudas (PAOK) (37)
- Top scorer: Nikos Angelakis (Aris) (14 goals)
- All-time series: Aris: 72; Drawn: 76; PAOK: 81
- Largest victory: 16 February 1975; Alpha Ethniki; PAOK 5–0 Aris
- Longest win streak: 9 games Aris (1929–1933)
- Longest unbeaten streak: 19 games Aris (1963–1972)
- Current win streak: 1 game PAOK (2026–present)
- Current unbeaten streak: 5 games PAOK (2025–present)
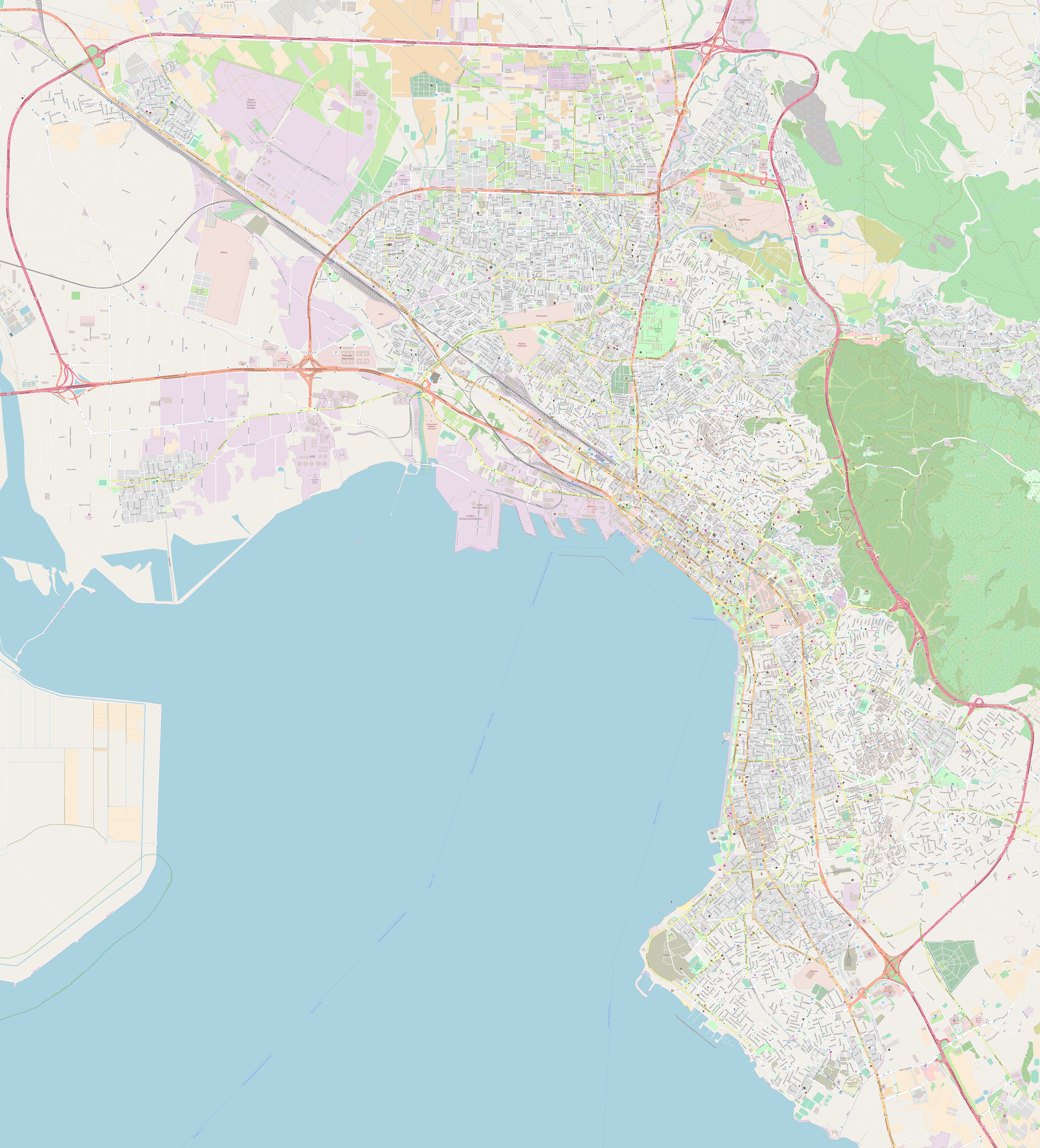

The Derby of Thessaloniki (Greek: Ντέρμπι Θεσσαλονίκης) is a football local rivalry between Aris and PAOK, both of which are based in Thessaloniki, Macedonia, Greece. Aris play their home games at the Kleanthis Vikelidis Stadium in Charilaou district of eastern Thessaloniki, while PAOK are based at the Toumba Stadium in the neighbouring Toumba district. The two stadiums are 1.54 km apart, straight-line distance.

== History ==
=== Social rivalry ===
The rivalry between these two Thessalonian clubs can be traced back to the interwar period. Upper class local Greeks supported Aris and Greek refugees supported PAOK. These refugees were mostly working class migrants from Asia Minor and Constantinople. They settled in the region of Macedonia after the population exchange between Greece and Turkey in 1923. The antagonism between those social groups has been expressed in many ways and one of them was football.

=== Football rivalry ===
Aris were founded in March 1914 and PAOK in April 1926. On 12 June 1927, the first derby of Thessaloniki took place, ending with a 2–1 PAOK victory. Up to 1959, the two clubs were fighting for the Macedonia Football Clubs Association (EPSM) (Greek: Ένωση Ποδοσφαιρικών Σωματείων Μακεδονίας or Ε.Π.Σ.Μ.) local championship title and they also met some times in the final stage of the Panhellenic Championship. In 1959, the Alpha Ethniki - the precursor of the current Super League - was set up as a national round-robin tournament. Aris vs PAOK rivalry has continued to escalate over the decades, with the two clubs in a persistent battle for supremacy in Northern Greece.

Honour	Aris	PAOK
Greek League Champions	3 (1928, 1932, 1946)	4 (1976, 1985, 2019, 2024)
Greek Cup Winners	1 (1970)	8 (1972, 1974, 2001, 2003, 2017, 2018, 2019, 2021)
Total	4	12

=== Other sports rivalries ===
Aris and PAOK rivalry extends to other sports as well, especially basketball, where from the mid-1980s until the early 1990s they were battling for the Greek Championship title, with both also achieving significant success in continental competitions. In volleyball, both teams competed for many years in the top-tier Greek Volley League. Aris had a strong side in the 1990s and PAOK has enjoyed domestic success since 2015.

== Statistics ==
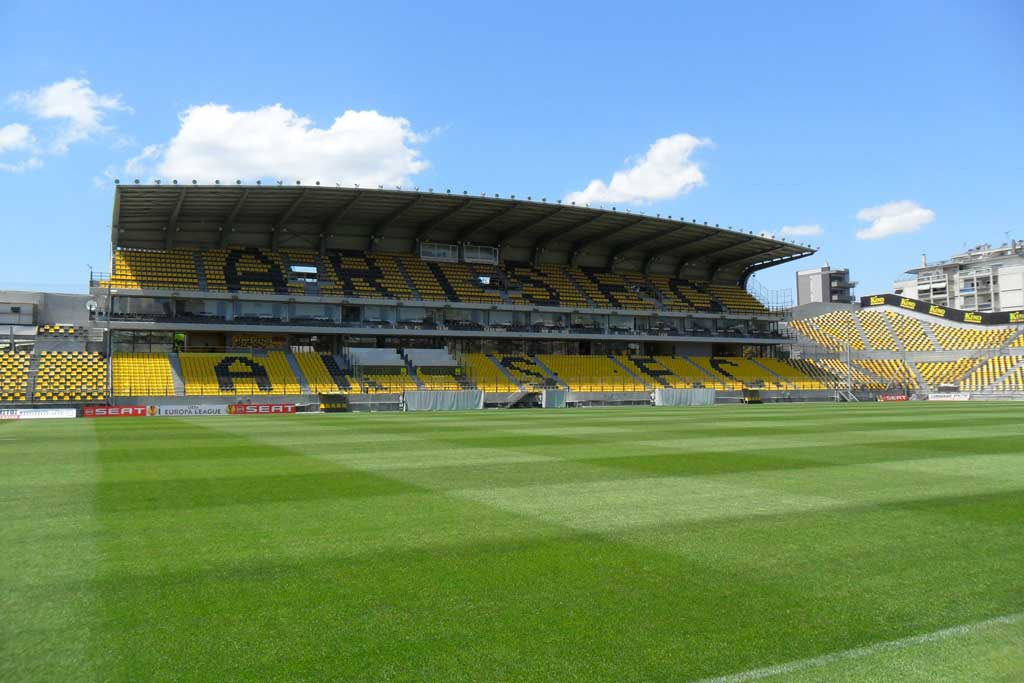
Kleanthis Vikelidis Stadium, home of Aris

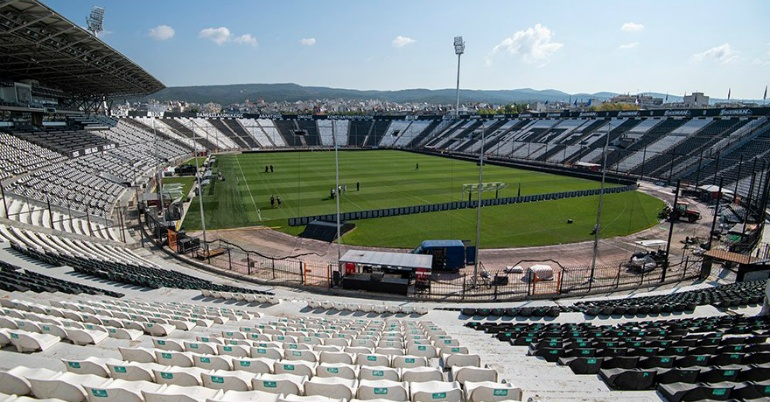
Toumba Stadium, home of PAOK

=== Head-to-head ===
	Aris wins	Draws	PAOK wins
Panhellenic Championship (1927–1959)
MFCA Championship^{1}	20	14	15
Qualifying stage	3	4	1
Final stage	5	2	5
Total	28	20	21
Alpha Ethniki / Super League (1959–present) ^{1}
At Aris home	23	28	17
At PAOK home	13	19	36
Total	36	47	53
Greek Cup
At Aris home	6	4	2
At PAOK home	1	5	5
Neutral field	1	0	0
Total	8	9	7
Official Matches Total
229	72	76	81

^{1} Including play-off games

Alpha Ethniki / SL goals	Aris	PAOK
At Aris home	72	57
At PAOK home	50	100
Total	122	157

- Record Alpha Ethniki / Super League win
  - Aris
    - Home: Aris – PAOK 5–1, Kleanthis Vikelidis Stadium (27 February 1966)
      (Alexiadis 24', Psifidis 43', Chatzikostas 65' pen., Syropoulos 69', 75' – Koudas 60' pen.)
    - Away: PAOK – Aris 1–4, Toumba Stadium (30 August 1998)
      (Kafes 63' – Charisteas 15', 54', Koulakiotis 68' o.g., Panopoulos 73')
  - PAOK
    - Home: PAOK – Aris 5–0, Toumba Stadium (16 February 1975)
      (Paridis 23', Koudas 28', 51', Tsilingiridis 68', Sarafis 87')
    - Away: Aris – PAOK 0–4, Kleanthis Vikelidis Stadium (7 December 1994)
      (Toursounidis 22', 57', Lagonidis 61', Bociek 90'+2')
- Bigger grade difference
  - Aris
    - Point system 3–2–1: +8 (75 vs 67), 1967–68
    - Point system 2–1–0: +6 (47 vs 41), 1979–80 and (33 vs 27), 1985–86
    - Point system 3–1–0: +15 (50 vs 35), 2007–08
  - PAOK
    - Point system 3–2–1: +23 (92 vs 69), 1972–73
    - Point system 2–1–0: +16 (46 vs 30), 1984-85
    - Point system 3–1–0: +47 (69 vs 22), 2013–14
- Attendance records in Alpha Ethniki
  - Aris home:
    - 27,000 Aris – PAOK 1–0, Kleanthis Vikelidis Stadium (25 March 1979)
    - 26,000 Aris – PAOK 0–1, Kleanthis Vikelidis Stadium (16 November 1980)
    - 24,589 Aris – PAOK 2–0, Kleanthis Vikelidis Stadium (7 October 1979)
  - PAOK home:
    - 44,486 PAOK – Aris 1–0, Toumba Stadium (28 January 1973)
    - 42,795 PAOK – Aris 2–0, Toumba Stadium (3 February 1980)
    - 42,296 PAOK – Aris 2–2, Toumba Stadium (22 February 1976)

== Match list ==
=== Alpha Ethniki / Super League Greece (1959 – present) ===
	Aris – PAOK					PAOK – Aris				
Season	R.	Date	Venue	Atten.	Score	R.	Date	Venue	Atten.	Score
1959–60	2	01–11–1959	Kleanthis Vikelidis Stadium	8,973	0–1	17	28–02–1960	Toumba Stadium	9,983	0–0
1959–60	p-o	31–07–1960	Kleanthis Vikelidis Stadium	N/A	0–0^{1}					
1960–61	20	05–03–1961	Kleanthis Vikelidis Stadium	N/A	1–1	5	16–10–1960	Toumba Stadium	N/A	3–0
1961–62	23	28–03–1962	Kleanthis Vikelidis Stadium	N/A	1–1	8	19–11–1961	Toumba Stadium	8,850	2–1
1962–63	12	16–12–1962	Kleanthis Vikelidis Stadium	9,223	0–3	27	12–05–1963	Toumba Stadium	N/A	3–0
1963–64	19	02–02–1964	Kleanthis Vikelidis Stadium	9,560	0–0	4	06–10–1963	Toumba Stadium	17,912	0–1
1964–65	25	09–05–1965	Kleanthis Vikelidis Stadium	8,791	0–0	10	13–12–1964	Toumba Stadium	21,655	0–2
1965–66	14	27–02–1966	Kleanthis Vikelidis Stadium	12,496	5–1	29	12–06–1966	Toumba Stadium	11,804	1–1
1966–67	28	04–06–1967	Kleanthis Vikelidis Stadium	12,421	1–0	13	22–01–1967	Toumba Stadium	20,177	0–0
1967–68	20	18–02–1968	Kleanthis Vikelidis Stadium	16,146	2–2	3	22–10–1967	Toumba Stadium	28,748	2–3
1968–69	8	17–11–1968	Kleanthis Vikelidis Stadium	20,123	2–0	25	23–03–1969	Toumba Stadium	29,442	0–0
1969–70	6	02–11–1969	Kleanthis Vikelidis Stadium	15,348	0–0	23	08–03–1970	Toumba Stadium	28,516	0–0
1970–71	4	04–11–1970	Kleanthis Vikelidis Stadium	16,475	1–0	21	21–02–1971	Toumba Stadium	29,890	2–2
1971–72	33	04–06–1972	Kleanthis Vikelidis Stadium	13,420	3–3	16	16–01–1972	Toumba Stadium	37,869	0–0
1972–73	34	03–06–1973	Kleanthis Vikelidis Stadium	22,648	1–2	17	28–01–1973	Toumba Stadium	44,486	1–0
1973–74	29	05–05–1974	Kleanthis Vikelidis Stadium	22,100	1–0	12	23–12–1973	Toumba Stadium	41,428	0–1
1974–75	2	06–10–1974	Kleanthis Vikelidis Stadium	18,246	2–1	19	16–02–1975	Toumba Stadium	36,025	5–0
1975–76	2	19–10–1975	Kleanthis Vikelidis Stadium	21,069	0–0	17	22–02–1976	Toumba Stadium	42,296	2–2
1976–77	6	14–11–1976	Kleanthis Vikelidis Stadium	21,500	1–2	23	13–03–1977	Toumba Stadium	41,950	2–0
1977–78	11	27–11–1977	Kleanthis Vikelidis Stadium	13,229	0–0	28	02–04–1978	Toumba Stadium	23,693	2–1
1978–79	25	25–03–1979	Kleanthis Vikelidis Stadium	27,000	1–0	8	12–11–1978	Toumba Stadium	36,567	1–0
1979–80	2	07–10–1979	Kleanthis Vikelidis Stadium	24,589	2–0	19	03–02–1980	Toumba Stadium	42,795	2–0
1980–81	10	16–11–1980	Kleanthis Vikelidis Stadium	26,000	0–1	27	12–04–1981	Toumba Stadium	28,157	1–1
1981–82	12	20–12–1981	Kleanthis Vikelidis Stadium	23,482	2–1	29	25–04–1982	Toumba Stadium	26,499	1–0
1982–83	21	06–03–1983	Kleanthis Vikelidis Stadium	18,699	0–0	4	31–10–1982	Toumba Stadium	21,026	0–2
1983–84	5	02–10–1983	Kleanthis Vikelidis Stadium	24,099	0–0	20	12–02–1984	Toumba Stadium	12,453	0–1
1984–85	17	03–02–1985	Kleanthis Vikelidis Stadium	20,280	3–0	2	30–09–1984	Toumba Stadium	30,890	2–0
1985–86	8	03–11–1985	Kleanthis Vikelidis Stadium	16,444	3–1	23	09–03–1986	Toumba Stadium	24,179	1–0
1986–87	4	20–09–1986	Kleanthis Vikelidis Stadium	20,968	0–1	19	22–02–1987	Toumba Stadium	26,282	2–0
1987–88	27	17–04–1988	Kleanthis Vikelidis Stadium	16,752	1–2	12	27–12–1987	Toumba Stadium	25,246	3–1
1988–89	9	20–11–1988	Kleanthis Vikelidis Stadium	12,947	0–0	24	19–03–1989	Toumba Stadium	14,663	1–1
1989–90	25	18–03–1990	Kleanthis Vikelidis Stadium	9,273	1–0	8	08–11–1989	Toumba Stadium	15,259	2–0
1990–91	14	06–01–1991	Kleanthis Vikelidis Stadium	13,827	0–1	31	12–05–1991	Toumba Stadium	10,505	2–1
1991–92	18	02–02–1992	Kleanthis Vikelidis Stadium	14,139	1–1	1	01–09–1991	Toumba Stadium	23,025	1–1
1992–93	15	23–12–1992	Kleanthis Vikelidis Stadium	4,145	1–2	32	15–05–1993	Toumba Stadium	1,554	2–0
1993–94	16	18–12–1993	Kleanthis Vikelidis Stadium	11,547	1–0	33	17–04–1994	Toumba Stadium	6,061	1–2
1994–95	9	07–12–1994	Kleanthis Vikelidis Stadium	3,587	0–4	26	02–04–1995	Toumba Stadium	19,374	2–0
1995–96	22	25-02-1996	Kleanthis Vikelidis Stadium	6,978	0–0	5	01–10–1995	Toumba Stadium	15,995	1–0
1996–97	8	18–11–1996	Kleanthis Vikelidis Stadium	11,462	0–0	25	16–03–1997	Toumba Stadium	28,038	2–1
1998–99	19	15–02–1999	Kleanthis Vikelidis Stadium	17,146	2–0	2	29–08–1998	Toumba Stadium	22,798	1–4
1999–2000	9	28–11–1999	Kleanthis Vikelidis Stadium	15,393	0–0	26	02–04–2000	Toumba Stadium	14,603	3–2
2000–01	4	01–11–2000	Kleanthis Vikelidis Stadium	12,890	4–0	19	17–02–2001	Toumba Stadium	11,969	2–0
2001–02	14	02–02–2002	Kleanthis Vikelidis Stadium	12,455	2–3	1	23–09–2001	Toumba Stadium	23,756	1–1
2002–03	11	15–12–2002	Kleanthis Vikelidis Stadium	9,897	2–0	26	13–04–2003	Trikala Municipal Stadium	3,339	2–0
2003–04	30	22–05–2004	Makedonikos Stadium	1,074	1–1	15	21–12–2003	Toumba Stadium	13,950	3–0
2004–05	20	27–02–2005	Kleanthis Vikelidis Stadium	10,202	1–3	5	24–10–2004	Toumba Stadium	10,975	2–2
2006–07	7	21–10–2006	Kleanthis Vikelidis Stadium	13,280	0–0	22	17–02–2007	Toumba Stadium	10,393	1–0
2007–08	5	21–10–2007	Kleanthis Vikelidis Stadium	11,565	3–1	20	10–02–2008	Toumba Stadium	22,000	3–0
2008–09	19	25–01–2009	Kleanthis Vikelidis Stadium	14,065	0–0	4	28–09–2008	Toumba Stadium	26,019	1–0
2009–10	26	14–03–2010	Kleanthis Vikelidis Stadium	17,353	2–0	11	22–11–2009	Toumba Stadium	23,034	4–1
2009–10	p-o	19–05–2010	Kleanthis Vikelidis Stadium	6,962	3–2	p-o	02–05–2010	Toumba Stadium	23,412	2–0
2010–11	20	30–01–2011	Kleanthis Vikelidis Stadium	13,234	0–0	5	03–10–2010	Toumba Stadium	20,084	0–1
2011–12	7	23–10–2011	Kleanthis Vikelidis Stadium	12,320	1–1	22	19–02–2012	Toumba Stadium	16,041	0–0
2012–13	20	03–02–2013	Kleanthis Vikelidis Stadium	12,673	2–2	5	30–09–2012	Toumba Stadium	20,440	4–1
2013–14	29	16–03–2014	Kleanthis Vikelidis Stadium	10,154	1–1	12	24–11–2013	Toumba Stadium	19,440	3–1
2018–19	7	21–10–2018	Kleanthis Vikelidis Stadium	16,434	1–2	22	24–02–2019	Toumba Stadium	22,544	1–1
2019–20	17	04–01–2020	Kleanthis Vikelidis Stadium	16,249	4–2	4	22–09–2019	Toumba Stadium	23,926	2–2
2019–20	p-o	28–06–2020	Kleanthis Vikelidis Stadium	Cl.doors	0–2	p-o	19–07–2020	Toumba Stadium	Cl.doors	0–0
2020–21	12	13–12–2020	Kleanthis Vikelidis Stadium	Cl.doors	1–0	25	07–03–2021	Toumba Stadium	Cl.doors	2–2
2020–21	p-o	21–04–2021	Kleanthis Vikelidis Stadium	Cl.doors	0–1	p-o	09–05–2021	Toumba Stadium	Cl.doors	2–0
2021–22	24	20–02–2022	Kleanthis Vikelidis Stadium	9,191	0–0	11	28–11–2021	Toumba Stadium	12,605	0–1
2021–22	p-o	17–04–2022	Kleanthis Vikelidis Stadium	7,902	1–0	p-o	11–05–2022	Toumba Stadium	6,932	0–1
2022–23	3	04–09–2022	Kleanthis Vikelidis Stadium	12,565	0–0	16	04–01–2023	Toumba Stadium	20,756	1–0
2022–23	p-o	19–03–2023	Kleanthis Vikelidis Stadium	11,165	1–2	p-o	30–04–2023	Toumba Stadium	8,905	3–2
2023–24	17	07–01–2024	Kleanthis Vikelidis Stadium	Cl.doors	2–1	4	17–09–2023	Toumba Stadium	17,731	0–0
2023–24	p-o	19–05–2024	Kleanthis Vikelidis Stadium	18,644	1–2	p-o	10–03–2024	Toumba Stadium	Cl.doors	0–1
2024–25	19	17–01–2025	Kleanthis Vikelidis Stadium	10,558	0–0	6	29–09–2024	Toumba Stadium	19,282	0–1
2025–26	20	08–02–2026	Kleanthis Vikelidis Stadium	8,946	0–0	13	07–12–2025	Toumba Stadium	24,636	3–1
2026–27	16	10–01–2027	Kleanthis Vikelidis Stadium		–	4	13–09–2026	Toumba Stadium	19,545	2–0

^{1} 7th-place playoff. PAOK finished 7th and Aris 8th, due to a better goal difference.

•There were no games in the 1997–98 and 2005–06 seasons, nor in the 2014–18 period due to the relegation of Aris to lower divisions.

=== Greek Cup ===
Season	Round	Leg	Venue	Date	Match	Score	Atten.	Winner
1939–40	Quarter final		Sintrivani Stadium	24 March 1940	PAOK – Aris	1–1 (aet)	N/A	Aris
1939–40	Quarter final	Replay	Iraklis Stadium	7 April 1940	Aris – PAOK	1–0	N/A	Aris
1947–48	2nd Round		Sintrivani Stadium	11 January 1948	PAOK – Aris	2–5	N/A	Aris
1949–50	Quarter final		Sintrivani Stadium	19 March 1950	PAOK – Aris	3–3 (aet)	N/A	Aris
1949–50	Quarter final	Replay ^{1}	Sintrivani Stadium	26 April 1950	Aris – PAOK	3–1	N/A	Aris
1950–51	Quarter final		Sintrivani Stadium	11 February 1951	PAOK – Aris	4–2 (aet)	N/A	PAOK
1951–52	Round of 16		Kleanthis Vikelidis Stadium	27 January 1952	Aris – PAOK	1–0	N/A	Aris
1957–58	Round of 16		Kleanthis Vikelidis Stadium	6 April 1958	Aris – PAOK	2–0	N/A	Aris
1961–62	Round of 16		Toumba Stadium	22 April 1962	PAOK – Aris	1–1 (aet)	N/A	Aris
1961–62	Round of 16	Replay	Kleanthis Vikelidis Stadium	9 May 1962	Aris – PAOK	1–1 (aet; draw)	2,062	Aris
1969–70	Final		Kaftanzoglio Stadium	28 June 1970	Aris – PAOK	1–0	46,695	Aris
1971–72	Quarter final		Kleanthis Vikelidis Stadium	7 June 1972	Aris – PAOK	1–2 ^{2}	13,919	PAOK
1977–78	Semifinal		Kleanthis Vikelidis Stadium	17 May 1978	Aris – PAOK	0–1 (aet)	22,900	PAOK
1979–80	Quarter final	1st Leg	Kleanthis Vikelidis Stadium	5 March 1980	Aris – PAOK	1–0	24,763	PAOK
1979–80	Quarter final	2nd Leg	Kaftanzoglio Stadium	30 April 1980	PAOK – Aris	2–0 (aet)	34,641	PAOK
1984–85	Round of 32	1st Leg	Toumba Stadium	26 December 1984	PAOK – Aris	2–0	23,827	PAOK
1984–85	Round of 32	2nd Leg	Kleanthis Vikelidis Stadium	16 January 1985	Aris – PAOK	3–1 (away)	14,639	PAOK
2000–01	Round of 16	1st Leg	Kleanthis Vikelidis Stadium	17 January 2001	Aris – PAOK	1–1	9,325	PAOK
2000–01	Round of 16	2nd Leg	Toumba Stadium	31 January 2001	PAOK – Aris	2–0	18,564	PAOK
2002–03	Final		Toumba Stadium	17 May 2003	PAOK – Aris	1–0	18,703	PAOK
2008–09	Round of 16		Toumba Stadium	14 January 2009	PAOK – Aris	0–0	14,870	PAOK
2008–09	Round of 16	Replay	Kleanthis Vikelidis Stadium	28 January 2009	Aris – PAOK	0–0 (aet; 8–9 p)	12,444	PAOK
2018–19	Group stage^{3}		Toumba Stadium	26 September 2018	PAOK – Aris	1–1	N/A	PAOK
2025–26	League phase		Kleanthis Vikelidis Stadium	3 December 2025	Aris – PAOK	1–1	N/A	Both

^{1} The original match was played on 26 March 1950 at Sintrivani Stadium. It was interrupted in the 85th minute, while Aris were leading by 1–0.

^{2} The match was abandoned in the 89th minute following an altercation between Aris players and the referee.

^{3} Final group standings: PAOK 7 (q), Ergotelis 4 (q), Aris 4, Aittitos Spata 1.
• Series won: Aris 7, PAOK 9.

== Significant games ==
=== First official match ===
12 June 1927
18:30 EEST
MFCA classification match

PAOK	2–1	Aris
Ventourelis 40' (pen.); Tsolakidis 75'		Vikelidis 80'

Iraklis Old Stadium, Thessaloniki
Referee: Dimitrios Douskas

The first-ever meeting between both clubs came in a Macedonia Football Clubs Association (MFCA) match on 12 June 1927. During the 1926–27 season, the newly established PAOK participated in the 2nd tier of the MFCA regional league and finished at the top, facing all four first-division teams (including Aris) in post-season classification matches. The game was held at Iraklis Old Stadium and ended with a 2–1 PAOK victory.

=== 1970 Greek Cup final ===
28 June 1970
20:30 EEST
Cup final

Aris	1–0	PAOK
Keramidas 8'		Koudas (penalty missed) 33'

Kaftanzoglio Stadium, Thessaloniki
Attendance: 46,695
Referee: Christos Michas (Athens)

In 1970, the two clubs met in a Cup final for the first time. The two teams took to the field at Kaftanzoglio Stadium on 28 June and Aris took the lead with Keramidas scoring early in the 8th minute. PAOK had a great chance to equalize from the penalty spot, but Koudas missed. Aris prevailed 1–0 and claimed the trophy which remains to this day their last domestic title.

=== 1972 Greek Cup quarter-final ===
7 June 1972
16:30 EEST
Cup quarter-final

Aris	1–2 (Abandoned in 89')	PAOK
Semertzis 16'; Balafas (red card) 43'		Apostolidis 5', 22'

Kleanthis Vikelidis Stadium, Thessaloniki
Attendance: 13,919
Referee: Christos Michas (Athens)

Aris had a 19-game unbeaten run against PAOK that lasted for nine years and ended in this eventful encounter. The match was abandoned in the 89th minute following an altercation between Aris players and the referee. Consequently, disciplinary action resulted in one-year bans for Alexiadis and Spyridon, an eight-month suspension for Syropoulos, and lesser penalties for Balafas and Semertzis. PAOK went on to win the 1972 Cup, which was their first domestic title.

=== 2003 Greek Cup final ===
17 May 2003
21:15 EEST
Cup final

PAOK	1–0	Aris
Georgiadis 24'	Report

Toumba Stadium, Thessaloniki
Attendance: 18,703
Referee: Giorgos Douros (Corinthia)

Second time that the two clubs met in a Cup final. Kaftanzoglio Stadium, a neutral ground and Thessaloniki's largest stadium was under renovation for the 2004 Summer Olympic games. On 6 September 2002, the HFF Board decided that should the final be held in Thessaloniki—mandated if a local club qualified—Toumba Stadium would serve as the venue, being the second largest in the city. Nine days prior to the match, Aris submitted a request to the Federation demanding that the final be held at either the Kalamaria or Makedonikos stadium—both neutral venues with significantly lower capacities—or that a draw be held between Toumba Stadium and Kleanthis Vikelidis Stadium. Both proposals were rejected, as the HFF Board unanimously reaffirmed its September decision on the matter. PAOK defeated Aris 1–0 with an excellent goal scored by Georgiadis and earned their fourth Greek Cup title. Aris had a great chance to equalize late at the game, but the ball hit the post on Morris' effort.

=== 2010 league game at Charilaou ===
14 March 2010
19:00 EET
Matchday 26

Aris	2–0	PAOK
Cámpora (penalty missed) 20' 22', 65'	Report	Sznaucner (yellow card) 63' (yellow-red card) 78'; Vieirinha (yellow card) 41' (yellow-red card) 80'

Kleanthis Vikelidis Stadium, Thessaloniki
Attendance: 17,353
Referee: Ilias Spathas (Piraeus)

In the 2009–10 season, Fernando Santos' PAOK were battling for the league title, trailing Panathinaikos by two points after 25 matches. Running a 13-game unbeaten streak, their title hopes ended on Matchday 26, when they lost 2–0 away to Héctor Cúper's Aris with Cámpora scoring both goals.

=== 2024 league title decider at Charilaou ===
19 May 2024
20:00 EEST
Matchday 10
(Play-off round)

Aris	1–2	PAOK
Morón 47'	Report	Michailidis (yellow card) 1' (yellow-red card) 78'; Brandon 30'; Taison 62'

Kleanthis Vikelidis Stadium, Thessaloniki
Attendance: 18,644
Referee: Orel Grinfeld (Israel)

Last Matchday of the 2023–24 season. PAOK were leading the table, being two points ahead of AEK Athens, and an away win against their city rivals was required to clinch the title. Aris were 5th on the table and had qualified for the Cup final, which was scheduled for the 25th of May. PAOK secured a 1–2 away victory to claim their fourth Greek championship. Aris had a great chance to equalize and deprive the title from their rivals, but Ansarifard headed the ball wide from close range on the last play of the game.

=== Other notable games ===
27 February 1966, Alpha Ethniki, Kleanthis Vikelidis Stadium, Aris – PAOK 5–1 (Alexiadis 24', Psifidis 43', Chatzikostas 65' pen., Syropoulos 69', 75' – Koudas 60' pen.). Aris record league home win against PAOK. PAOK goalkeeper Mouselemidis was injured early in the first half and he was replaced by defender Tatsis as substitutions in football had not been established at the time.

16 February 1975, Alpha Ethniki, Toumba Stadium, PAOK – Aris 5–0 (Paridis 23', Koudas 28', 51', Tsilingiridis 68', Sarafis 87'). Largest victory ever recorded in the Thessaloniki derby.

17 May 1978, Greek Cup, Kleanthis Vikelidis Stadium, Aris – PAOK 0–1 (aet, Orfanos 112'). First and only time to this day that the two clubs met in a Cup semi-final.

7 December 1994, Alpha Ethniki, Kleanthis Vikelidis Stadium, Aris – PAOK 0–4 (Toursounidis 22', 57', Lagonidis 61', Bociek 90'+2'). PAOK record league away win against Aris. Match was initially scheduled on 20 November, but was postponed due to crowd violence.

16 March 1997, Alpha Ethniki, Toumba Stadium, PAOK – Aris 2–1 (Vryzas 70', 75' – Mavrogenidis 82'). Crucial game for both clubs, as PAOK were battling for European qualification and Aris to avoid relegation. Season eventually concluded with PAOK qualifying for the next season's UEFA Cup and Aris being relegated to the second-tier Beta Ethniki for the first time in the club's history.

29 August 1998, Alpha Ethniki, Toumba Stadium, PAOK – Aris 1–4 (Kafes 63' – Charisteas 15', 54', Koulakiotis 68' o.g., Panopoulos 73'). Aris record league away win against PAOK, marking their emphatic return to the top-tier Alpha Ethniki with emerging talent Charisteas having his breakout game and scoring a brace.

28 January 2009, Greek Cup, Kleanthis Vikelidis Stadium, Aris – PAOK 0–0 (aet, 8–9 pen.). First and only time to this day that a Thessaloniki derby was decided by penalty shoot-out. Karabelas from Aris missed the last penalty sending the ball over the bar.

4 January 2020, Super League Greece, Kleanthis Vikelidis Stadium, Aris – PAOK 4–2 (Larsson 17', Vélez 41', Rose 47', Sasha 71' – Świderski 10', Matos 77'). Aris brought an end to PAOK’s 51-game unbeaten league run that began in March 2018, which ranks as the second-longest in Greek top-flight history, surpassed only by Olympiacos' 58-match record set from October 1972 to April 1974.

== Top scorers ==
Including all the Alpha Ethniki and Greek Cup games since 1959–60.

Aris	Total	PAOK	Total
(Greece) Alekos Alexiadis	7	(Greece) Giannis Giakoumis	5
(Greece) Kostas Papaioannou	6	(Greece) Giorgos Koudas	5
(Greece) Vangelis Syropoulos	4	(Greece) Georgios Skartados	5
(Greece) Vasilis Dimitriadis	4	(Greece) Apostolos Vasiliadis	4
(Greece) Angelos Charisteas	4	(Greece) Stavros Sarafis	4
		(Greece) Giorgos Kostikos	4

- Three goals for Aris: Petkakis, Pallas, Kouis, Zelilidis Cámpora and Aganzo.
- Three goals for PAOK: Fountoukidis, Apostolidis, Paridis, Orfanos, Borbokis, Lagonidis, Zouboulis, Yiasoumi and Athanasiadis.
- Giorgos Koutsis has scored once for Aris against PAOK and once for PAOK against Aris.

== Head-to-head ranking in Super League Greece ==
P.	60	61	62	63	64	65	66	67	68	69	70	71	72	73	74	75	76	77	78	79	80	81	82	83	84	85	86	87	88	89	90	91	92	93	94	95	96	97	98	99	00	01	02	03	04	05	06	07	08	09	10	11	12	13	14	15	16	17	18	19	20	21	22	23	24	25	26
1																	1									1																																		1					1		
2														2					2		2																														2			2			2		2		2	2	2				
3										3					3	3		3		3		3	3						3		3					3									3							3			3							3	3			3	3
4				4				4	4		4		4		4					4		4		4	4							4	4		4			4	4	4		4	4	4				4	4	4	4							4						4			
5							5	5		5	5		5					5			5		5	5	5			5						5	5						5					5							5			5				5	5			5	5	5	5
6			6		6		6									6			6																					6				6			6	6		6		6															
7	7					7											7									7	7			7	7					7	7				7	7																									
8	8				8	8																								8			8																																		
9									9			9		9															9			9		9									9						9				9														
10		10										10															10																																								
11																												11																																							
12		12																																																																	
13			13																																										13									13													
14				14																																	14									14																					
15																																																																			
16																																						16																													
17																																																																			
18																																																							18												
Beta Ethniki
1																																							1																												
2																																																											2								
3																																															3											3									
Gamma Ethniki
1																																																									1										
2																																																								2											

• Total: PΑΟΚ 49 times higher finishes, Aris 18 times higher finishes.

== European records ==
=== Aris ===
Competition	App	Pld	W	D	L	Goals
UEFA Cup / Europa League	13	53	21	15	17	69–75
UEFA Conference League	4	12	6	2	4	18–15
UEFA Cup Winners' Cup	1	2	0	1	1	2–6
Inter-Cities Fairs Cup	5	12	3	2	7	12–28
Total	23	79	30	20	29	101–124

=== PAOK ===
Competition	App	Pld	W	D	L	Goals
European Cup / Champions League	10	32	8	10	14	45–57
UEFA Cup / Europa League	31	178	68	49	61	254–209
UEFA Conference League	4	36	18	8	10	58–38
UEFA Cup Winners' Cup	6	18	8	5	5	24–23
Inter-Cities Fairs Cup	3	6	2	0	4	5–17
Total	54	270	104	72	94	386–344

Last updated: 27 August 2026

== Men in both teams ==
Players

- (Greece) Georgios Kalogiannis
- (Greece) Kostas Veliadis
- (Greece) Dimitris Raptopoulos
- (Greece) Dimitris Stavridis
- (Greece) Vasilis Lazos
- (Bosnia and Herzegovina) Nikola Nikić
- (Greece) Kyriakos Alexandridis
- (Greece) Apostolos Tsourelas
- (Greece) Kostas Ikonomidis
- (Greece) Antonis Gioukoudis
- (Greece) Michalis Gekas
- (Greece) Nikos Panagiotidis
- (Greece) Charalambos Nikolaou
- (Greece) Stefanos Borbokis
- (Greece) Dimitris Markos
- (Greece) Giorgos Koutsis
- (Greece) Giorgos Theodoridis
- (Greece) Christos Lambakis
- (Greece) Kostas Frantzeskos
- (Greece) Vangelis Pourliotopoulos
- (Greece) Nikos Skarmoutsos
- (Greece) Kostas Chalkias
- (Serbia) Vladan Ivić
- (Greece) Thanasis Papazoglou
- (Spain) Victor Vitolo
- (Greece) Aristotelis Karassalidis
- (Greece) Christos Intzidis
- (Greece) Dimitris Konstantinidis
- (Albania) Ergys Kaçe

Managers

- (Greece) Nikolaos Angelakis
- (Greece) Kleanthis Vikelidis
- (Socialist Federal Republic of Yugoslavia) Branko Stanković
- (Netherlands) Thijs Libregts
- (Greece) Georgios Paraschos
- (Bosnia and Herzegovina) Dušan Bajević
