= Milanko =

Milanko is both a given name and a surname. Notable people with the name include:

== Given name ==
- Milanko Petrović (born 1988), Serbian biathlete, 2010 Winter Olympics in Vancouver, Canada
- Milanko Rašković (born 1981), Serbian footballer
- Milanko Renovica (1928–2013), Bosnian and former Yugoslav politician

== Surname ==
- Goran Milanko (born 1968), Croatian footballer
