= Georgios Toursounidis =

Greek footballer

Giorgos Toursounidis
Personal information
- Full name: Georgios Toursounidis
- Date of birth: 21 August 1970 (age 56)
- Place of birth: Thessaloniki, Greece
- Height: 1.76 m (5 ft 9 in)
- Position: Right winger

Youth career
- 1978–1988: PAOK

Senior career*
Years	Team	Apps	(Gls)
1988–2000	PAOK	261	(35)
2000–2002	Xanthi	35	(0)
2002	PAOK	0	(0)
Total		296	(35)

International career
1990–1995	Greece	22	(1)
- * Club domestic league appearances and goals

Georgios Toursounidis (Greek: Γεώργιος Τουρσουνίδης; born 21 August 1970) is a Greek former international footballer who played as a right winger and spent most of his career at PAOK.

== Career ==
=== Club career ===
Toursounidis joined PAOK Academy at the age of 8 and his skills and talent quickly stood out and developed. His technical ability, dribbling and speed were at a high level and resulted in him being called as the successor of Giorgos Koudas, who had retired from active football a few years ago. On 2 April 1989, he made his league debut with the first team in a match against Levadiakos (2–0) held at Toumba Stadium. In the early 1990s, Panathinaikos president at the time, Giorgos Vardinogiannis, offered him 250 million drachmas to sign a five-year contract and his transfer to the Athenian club seemed almost certain. However, Toursounidis' emotional bond with the club, combined with the protests of PAOK fans, prevented the transfer from being completed. Toursounidis remained at his beloved PAOK and played for 11 years, recording a total of 341 appearances in all competitions (261 in the league, 62 in the Cup, 17 in European competitions and 1 in the League Cup) and he is currently PAOK 9th all-time appearance maker. He often performed well and played with passion in matches against Aris and Olympiacos and made his best performance on December 7, 1994, where he scored the first two goals of the Aris–PAOK derby that took place at Charilaou Stadium and ended with a huge 0–4 away victory.

In January 2000, he was informed by Dušan Bajević, who had recently taken over as PAOK's manager, that he was not in his plans and was transferred to Xanthi as a free agent. He made 35 league appearances with Xanthi and in January 2002 he requested to return to PAOK. In a private conversation with Bajević, he clarified that he had no demand from him to use him and his only desire was to return to the club he loved from young age and end his football career wearing the white-black jersey. Bajević gave his consent but never used him in a match until the summer when he completed his coaching career at PAOK. When Toursounidis realized that the team was not counting on him for the new season and did not offer him a new contract, he suddenly announced in a press conference his retirement from active football at the age of 32.

=== International career ===
Toursounidis made his international debut with the Greek national side on 30 May 1990, in an away friendly against Italy which ended 0–0. He had 22 caps and scored one goal for Greece between 1990 and 1995. He was unlucky and not included in the squad that participated in the 1994 FIFA World Cup, as he missed a large part of that season due to injury.

== Career statistics ==
=== Club career ===
Club	Season	Greek League		Greek Cup		Continental		Total	
Club	Season	Apps	Goals	Apps	Goals	Apps	Goals	Apps	Goals
PAOK	1988–89	2	0	0	0	0	0	2	0
PAOK	1989–90	23	3	4	0	–		28 (Note: Toursounidis had 1 additional appearance that season in the Greek League Cup.)	3
PAOK	1990–91	32	2	10	1	2	0	44	3
PAOK	1991–92	30	5	12	2	4	0	46	7
PAOK	1992–93	19	4	3	1	2	0	24	5
PAOK	1993–94	12	1	4	0	–		16	1
PAOK	1994–95	30	3	4	0	–		37	3
PAOK	1995–96	33	1	10	4	–		43	5
PAOK	1996–97	31	6	3	1	–		34	7
PAOK	1997–98	27	8	6	1	6	0	39	9
PAOK	1998–99	22	2	2	0	2	0	26	2
PAOK	1999–2000 (i)	0	0	4	0	1	0	5	0
PAOK	Total	261	35	62	10	17	0	341	45
Xanthi	1999–2000 (ii)	15	0	0	0	–		15	0
Xanthi	2000–01	20	0	10	2	–		30	2
Xanthi	2001–02 (i)	0	0	0	0	–		0	0
Xanthi	Total	35	0	10	2	–		45	2
PAOK	2001–02 (ii)	0	0	0	0	–		0	0
Career total		296	35	72	12	17	0	386	47

Source: RSSSF

=== International career ===
National team	Year	Caps	Goals
Greece
Greece	1990	1	0
Greece	1991	8	0
Greece	1992	5	1
Greece	1994	3	0
Greece	1995	5	0
Total		22	1

International goal scored by Giorgos Toursounidis
No.	Date	Venue	Opponent	Score	Result	Competition
1	25 March 1992	Tsirio Stadium, Limassol	Cyprus	1–0	3–1	Friendly
