= 1989–90 Newcastle United F.C. season =

Newcastle United
1989–90 season
- Chairman: Gordon McKeag
- Manager: Jim Smith
- Stadium: St James' Park
- Division Two: 3rd
- FA Cup: Fifth round
- League Cup: Third round
- Full Members Cup: Northern Area Semi-Final
- Top goalscorer: League: Quinn (32); All: Quinn (34)
- Highest home attendance: 32,216 (vs. Sunderland)
- Lowest home attendance: 6,167 (vs. Oldham Athletic)
- Average home league attendance: 21,579
Home colours	Away colours

During the 1989–90 season, Newcastle United participated in the Football League Division Two. After the disappointment of the previous season's relegation, the manager Jim Smith again dabbled in the transfer market, offloading the captain Kenny Sansom, the former captain Glenn Roeder, Denmark's Frank Pingel, Rob McDonald and the promising youngsters Michael O'Neill and Darren Jackson.

With new signings including their former player Mark McGhee, the team started the season with an emphatic 5–2 win over Leeds United at St. James' Park that saw another new signing, Micky Quinn, score four times on his debut. After a promising start, the team struggled until Smith signed the Scotland skipper, Roy Aitken, who instilled steel into a lightweight midfield of ball players Kevin Brock, Kevin Dillon and John Gallacher. United regained their momentum with a change of formation that saw Bjorn Kristensen switched to sweeper and the team returned to the top of the table, only to be overtaken by Leeds and Sheffield United. Left to compete in the promotion play-offs after finishing third, they lost to their local rivals Sunderland in the semi-finals. It was a disappointing end to a season that also saw unrest from the fans and talk of take-overs.

== League table ==
Pos	Team	Pld	W	D	L	GF	GA	GD	Pts	Qualification or relegation
1	Leeds United (C, P)	46	24	13	9	79	52	+27	85	Promotion to the First Division
2	Sheffield United (P)	46	24	13	9	78	58	+20	85	Promotion to the First Division
3	Newcastle United	46	22	14	10	80	55	+25	80	Qualification for the Second Division play-offs
4	Swindon Town (Note: Swindon Town were disqualified from promotion after being found guilty of making illegal payments, and the play-off runners-up Sunderland were promoted in their place.) (O)	46	20	14	12	79	59	+20	74	Qualification for the Second Division play-offs
5	Blackburn Rovers	46	19	17	10	74	59	+15	74	Qualification for the Second Division play-offs

Source: Statto
Rules for classification: 1) Points; 2) Goal difference; 3) Goals scored
(C) Champions; (O) Play-off winners; (P) Promoted

== Appearances, goals and cards ==
(Substitute appearances in brackets)

Pos.	Name	League		FA Cup		League Cup		ZDS Cup		Playoffs		Total	
Pos.	Name	Apps	Goals	Apps	Goals	Apps	Goals	Apps	Goals	Apps	Goals	Apps	Goals
GK	(England) John Burridge	28	0	4	0	2	0	3	0	2	0	39	0
GK	(Republic of Ireland) Gary Kelly	4	0	0	0	1	0	0	0	0	0	5	0
GK	(Northern Ireland) Tommy Wright	14	0	0	0	0	0	0	0	0	0	14	0
DF	(Scotland) Roy Aitken	44	1	4	0	3	0	3	0	2	0	56	1
DF	(Republic of Ireland) John Anderson	29 (8)	4	1	0	1	0	0 (1)	0	2	0	33 (9)	4
DF	(England) Darren Bradshaw	9 (3)	0	1 (1)	0	0	0	1	0	1	0	12 (4)	0
DF	(Denmark) Bjørn Kristensen	25 (8)	3	3	0	2	0	3	0	2	0	35 (8)	3
DF	(England) Ray Ranson	33	0	3	0	2	0	3	0	1	0	42	0
DF	(England) Kevin Scott	42	3	4	1	3	0	2	0	2	0	53	4
DF	(England) Mark Stimson	35 (2)	1	4	0	3	0	1	0	2	0	45 (2)	1
DF	(Scotland) Paul Sweeney	14 (5)	0	2	0	1	0	3 (2)	0	0	0	19 (6)	0
DF	(England) Andy Thorn	10	1	0	0	2	1	0	0	0	0	12	2
MF	(England) Billy Askew	4	0	0	0	0	0	0	0	2	0	6	0
MF	(England) Kevin Brock	43 (1)	2	2	0	3	1	2	0	2	0	52 (1)	3
MF	(England) Kevin Dillon	43	0	3 (1)	0	3	0	3	0	0 (1)	0	52 (2)	0
MF	(England) Wayne Fereday	21 (4)	0	1	0	1 (1)	0	1 (2)	0	0	0	24 (7)	0
MF	(Scotland) John Gallacher	21 (7)	6	2	0	3	1	3	1	0	0	29 (7)	8
MF	(Republic of Ireland) Liam O'Brien	14 (5)	2	2	1	1	0	3	1	0 (2)	0	20 (7)	4
FW	(England) Gary Brazil	4 (12)	2	0 (1)	0	1 (1)	1	0 (1)	0	0	0	5 (15)	3
FW	(Scotland) Mark McGhee	46	19	4	5	3	1	3	0	2	0	58	25
FW	(England) Micky Quinn	45	32	4	2	2	0	2	2	2	0	55	36
FW	(England) David Robinson	0 (1)	0	0 (1)	1	0	0	0	0	0	0	0 (2)	1

=== Coaching staff ===
Position	Staff
Manager	(England) Jim Smith
Assistant Manager	(England) Bobby Saxton
