= Who Ate All the Pies? =

Football chant

William "Fatty" Foulke, in whose honour the chant may have originated

"Who Ate All the Pies?" is a football chant sung by fans in the UK. It is usually sung to the tune of "Knees Up Mother Brown" and is aimed at overweight footballers, officials or other supporters.

== Background and origin ==
The chant was first sung in 1894 by Sheffield United supporters, and directed at the club's goalkeeper William "Fatty" Foulke, who weighed over 300 lb (140 kg). In his early career he played for Blackwell Colliery, subsequently playing for Sheffield United and Chelsea FC.

If the tune used was Knees up Mother Brown, then it is highly improbable that the chant originated with Foulke who retired in 1907 and died in 1916; Knees up Mother Brown originated in 1918. Also, Foulke weighed 178 pounds (81 kg) in 1894. According to sportswriters of the time, he was nicknamed "the lengthy one" or "the octopus"; his weight gain came later.

== The lyrics ==
The lyrics of the chant are:

Who ate all the pies?
Who ate all the pies?
You fat bastard,
You fat bastard,
You ate all the pies!

A variation replaces the second line with "The burgers and the fries."

== Adoption and inspiration ==
Part of the song (the third line – "You fat bastard") has been adopted by Roy "Chubby" Brown as his anthem and is enthusiastically chanted by the audiences during his stage performances.

This line was also chanted at gigs by 1990s indie band Carter The Unstoppable Sex Machine; it is also included as the intro on their album 30 Something. It was chanted at their manager Jon Fat Beast, who had a tendency to appear on stage stripped to the waist, displaying his ample abdomen.

American rock band Faith No More released a live album You Fat Bastards: Live at the Brixton Academy, so named after the crowd were heard singing the chant at the band's show in April 1990.

The Vegetarian Society have used a variant of this, "Who ate all the peas?", as a slogan. They displayed it on promotional hoardings in football grounds as part of their "Men and Meat Campaign", intended to combat the idea that vegetarianism is unmanly.

The chant has been associated with the striker Micky Quinn, who played for six football clubs in the 1980s and 1990s. He was particularly identified with the chant following an incident in a match between Quinn's then club Newcastle United and Grimsby Town in March 1992, in which a fan threw a pie onto the pitch which Quinn promptly picked up and ate. The chant even formed the title for Quinn's autobiography, which was published in 2003.

During cricket matches, the chant is known to have been directed at players such as Shane Warne, by spectators belonging to the Barmy Army.

== Wayne Shaw controversy ==
In a February 2017 incident dubbed "Piegate", 23-stone Sutton United goalkeeper Wayne Shaw was fined and suspended by the FA for breaching gambling laws, after he ate a pie during a match and then admitted he saw there were odds of 8/1 on him doing so and tipped off his friends.
