= Wayne Shaw (footballer) =

English footballer

Personal information
- Date of birth: 13 January 1972 (age 54)
- Place of birth: Millbrook, Southampton, England
- Position: Goalkeeper

Youth career
- 1985–1988: Southampton
- 1988–1990: Reading

Senior career*
Years	Team	Apps	(Gls)
1990	→ Basingstoke Town (loan)		
1990–1991	Gosport Borough		
1991–1996	Wimborne Town		
- Bashley
- Bournemouth FC
- Gosport Borough
- BAT Sports
1996–1997	AFC Lymington		
1998–1999	AFC Lymington		
1999–2003	AFC Totton		
2003–2009	Eastleigh	58	(0)
2007	→ Wimborne Town (loan)	0	(0)
2009–2012	Sutton United	5	(0)
2012	Fleet Town	3	(0)
2012	Eastleigh	0	(0)
2012–2013	Sutton United	2	(0)
2014–2015	Gosport Borough	0	(0)
2015–2017	Sutton United	1	(0)
2016	→ Alresford Town (loan)	1	(0)
Total		70	(0)
- * Club domestic league appearances and goals

Wayne Shaw (born 13 January 1972) is an English former semi-professional footballer who played as a goalkeeper.

Shaw was nicknamed "Roly Poly Goalie", owing to being 23 stone (150 kg; 320 lb).

== Career ==
Shaw started in football at Southampton's academy as a centre half, where he was teammates with future England internationals Alan Shearer and Matt Le Tissier. He was then sent on loan for two years to Reading. He was later released by Southampton for being overweight. He then moved to Basingstoke Town and was loaned to Bashley where he transitioned into a goalkeeper. From there he went to AFC Lymington and in 1999 moved to AFC Totton because of family commitments. By 2005, he had moved to Eastleigh where he saved a penalty during their Isthmian Premier League play-off final which helped Eastleigh get promoted into the Conference South for the first time. In 2010, he moved to Sutton United alongside Eastleigh's manager Paul Doswell but returned to Eastleigh as a player-coach two years later. During his career, Shaw would often be subject to the "Who ate all the pies?" football chant.

While playing for Sutton United, Shaw was involved in an altercation with fans of Kingstonian prior to a Surrey Senior Cup match in December 2013 where he jumped over advertising hoardings and headbutted a fan who was insulting him about his weight. He was released by Sutton following the incident. Following a brief period with Gosport Borough, where he was the goalkeeping coach for their FA Trophy final appearance against Cambridge United, he was re-signed by Sutton in February 2015 until his departure in February 2017. He subsequently retired after his departure.

== "Piegate" controversy ==
On 20 February 2017, Sutton lost 2–0 to Arsenal in the fifth round of the 2016–17 FA Cup. During the match, Shaw ate a pasty, described as a "pie" in reports, while sitting on the bench, even though he knew that a betting company was offering 8–1 odds against him eating a pie on television. The Football Association investigated a possible breach of their rules relating to betting, and the Gambling Commission investigated whether there were any unusual patterns of betting and whether the company had operated within its licence. Shaw resigned from Sutton United after the investigations were announced. Following his resignation, the supermarket chain Morrisons offered Shaw a job as an official "pie-taster". Later, a petition was launched by the political blogger Paul Staines for Shaw to be given his job at the club back. In Sutton United's first game after his departure, they were forced to use an outfield player in goal when their first choice goalkeeper was injured, having had no time to sign a replacement for Shaw.

On 6 September 2017 Shaw was fined £375 and banned for two months by the FA for breaching their betting rules.
