= Micky Quinn =

English footballer (born 1962)

Personal information
- Full name: Michael Quinn
- Date of birth: 2 May 1962 (age 64)
- Place of birth: Liverpool, England
- Height: 5 ft 9 in (1.75 m)
- Position: Centre forward

Youth career
- 1978–1979: Derby County

Senior career*
Years	Team	Apps	(Gls)
1979–1982	Wigan Athletic	69	(19)
1982–1983	Stockport County	63	(39)
1983–1986	Oldham Athletic	80	(34)
1986–1989	Portsmouth	121	(54)
1989–1992	Newcastle United	110	(57)
1992–1995	Coventry City	64	(25)
1994	→ Plymouth Argyle (loan)	3	(0)
1995	→ Watford (loan)	5	(0)
1995–1996	PAOK Thessaloniki	9	(1)
Total		524	(235)
- * Club domestic league appearances and goals

Michael Quinn (born 2 May 1962) is an English former professional footballer who played as a centre forward.

Quinn's playing career lasted from 1979 until 1996. He most notably played in the Premier League for Coventry City, although his previous spells with Portsmouth and Newcastle United brought his best goals tally and his most appearances for any one club. He also played in the Football League for Wigan Athletic, Stockport County, Oldham Athletic, Plymouth Argyle and Watford before finishing his career with a brief spell in Greece with PAOK, during a career in which he played in 524 league matches and scored 235 league goals.

== Early life ==
Quinn was born in the Everton area of Liverpool in Lancashire (now Merseyside) in 1962, the oldest of four children born to Michael Quinn and Patricia Silvano. From the age of five, he lived on the Cantril Farm estate and from that young age he has been a supporter of Liverpool. He is the grandson of Italian-born boxer Luigi Silvano (known professionally as Lou Sullivan).

== Club career ==
=== Early career ===
Quinn began his career as an apprentice with Derby County signing for the East Midlands club upon leaving school in 1978. However, Quinn only lasted four months at the Baseball Ground, and returned to his Merseyside home, suffering from homesickness. Eager to turn professional, Quinn joined Wigan Athletic in September 1979 as an apprentice and signed professional forms later in that season, being given his Fourth Division debut by manager Ian McNeill in April 1980, just prior to his 18th birthday. He went on to score 19 goals in 69 Fourth Division games for Wigan.

After helping Wigan gain promotion to the Third Division in 1982, manager Larry Lloyd considered Quinn too inexperienced for the higher level of league football and was given a free transfer to Stockport County, who were still in the Fourth Division, and it was at Stockport where Quinn established himself as a regular goalscorer. Now having proven his worth, Quinn attracted the interest of manager Joe Royle at Second Division Oldham Athletic and joined the club for £53,000 in January 1984. Quinn was at Boundary Park for just over two years and proved himself as a competent goalscorer at the higher level of football.

=== Portsmouth ===
After scoring 34 goals in 80 Second Division games for Oldham, Quinn joined Portsmouth in March 1986, with manager Alan Ball paying £150,000 for Quinn's services in an attempt to push for promotion to the First Division, but Portsmouth just missed automatic promotion on the final day of the season – just as had happened the previous season. In April 1986, Quinn was found guilty of drink-driving and received a £100 fine, as well as a one-year driving ban for a similar offence committed in Liverpool during 1985. Quinn breached the driving ban twice later in 1986, and in January 1987 he was sentenced to 21 days in prison but was freed after serving 14 days. At the end of Portsmouth's home fixture against West Bromwich Albion on 25 October 1986, Quinn and teammate Paul Wood were both ejected from the ground by police officers after being overheard swearing at a linesman during the second half of the game. Chief Inspector David Hanna of Hampshire Constabulary said they would have been ejected at half-time if the incident had happened in the first half.

Despite this, Quinn was Portsmouth's top goalscorer with 24 goals in all competitions, as they finished Second Division runners-up and reclaimed their First Division place that they had last held in the late 1950s. However, Portsmouth were relegated back to the Second Division after just one year, with Quinn scoring 11 goals that season. Weighing in at around 88 kilograms (194 lb), Quinn's goals were celebrated by Portsmouth fans with the chant: "He's fat, he's round, he's worth a million pound, Micky Quinn, Micky Quinn!" In August 1987, Quinn was fined £5,000 by The Football Association for declaring that he was "the hardest man in football."

Quinn stayed at Fratton Park for the 1988–89 season and scored 20 league goals, but Portsmouth finished 20th in the league and their good early season form was perhaps all that saved them from a second successive relegation. Midway through the season, Ball departed Fratton Park and was succeeded by John Gregory. This transition was largely blamed for Portsmouth's slump in form. Gregory did appoint Quinn as the new first-team captain and when his contract expired at the end of the season, Quinn was offered a new deal but rejected the offer and put in a transfer request, hoping for a transfer to a First Division club.

=== Newcastle United ===
Newcastle United manager Jim Smith paid £680,000 for Quinn in July 1989, just after their relegation to the Second Division. Portsmouth manager John Gregory had demanded £1.5 million for Quinn (an exceptionally large sum for a Second Division player at the time), but Smith had offered just £250,000 and the fee was set by a tribunal. At the time, Quinn was one of the most expensive players ever to be signed by the Magpies. Other clubs that were interested in signing Quinn at the time included Watford and Manchester City, who had just been promoted to the First Division.

Quinn scored four goals on his debut in a 5–2 home win over Leeds United on 19 August 1989 and finished as the Football League's top goalscorer for the 1989–90 season with 34 league goals. Quinn managed 39 goals in all competitions that season. The Magpies were beaten to one of the automatic promotion places by Leeds and Sheffield United, and their promotion hopes were ended when they lost to local rivals Sunderland in the play-offs. Quinn scored 20 goals for the Magpies the following season, but the club's league form slumped and they finished down in tenth position. Before the season ended, Quinn and his teammates had a new manager, when Smith resigned and was succeeded by Ossie Ardiles.

Quinn was ruled out of action for three months in October 1991, after he suffered a knee injury and managed just 7 goals in 22 matches. The 1991–92 season was arguably the worst season in Newcastle's history, as they only narrowly avoided relegation to the third tier of the English league. Ardiles was sacked on 5 February 1992 and was succeeded by Kevin Keegan, but Quinn fell out with Keegan soon afterwards over newspaper speculation that Quinn had condemned the set-up as a "shambles". When the 1992–93 season started, Quinn was no longer a first-choice player on Tyneside and on 20 November 1992, he was sold to Coventry City. Bobby Gould paid £250,000 for his services, after a bid from Aston Villa who were in the Premier League title race at the time was rejected by the North East England club. At the age of 30, Quinn would be playing in the top division of English football for only the second season in his career.

=== Coventry City ===
During his first six months at Highfield Road, Quinn scored 17 Premier League goals, 10 of which were in his first six games. Scoring in his first four games gives him the distinction of being one of only seven players to achieve this accolade, and this would not be matched in the Premier League for 22 years. His 13 goal involvements in his first ten matches is also a Premier League record, and was not matched until Bruno Fernandes in 2020. Quinn's run of goals included two goals each against Manchester City, Southampton, Liverpool and Aston Villa. Due to his goalscoring form, Coventry's supporters would amend the chant used by Portsmouth's fans by affectionately chanting: "he's fat, he's round; he scores on every ground". Quinn's performances were not enough to take Coventry City beyond 15th place in the final league table, although they had occupied fourth place at one stage during the season. He was nicknamed "Sumo" and famously quoted that he was the Premier League's "fastest player over a yard". Other nicknames included "Hippofatamus" and "Bob", the latter from supporters who claimed that he bore a physical resemblance to the television entertainer Bob Carolgees. Another nickname was the "Mighty Quinn", also a reference to his physique, from the song written by Bob Dylan.

The club improved to 11th place the following season with Quinn scoring eight league goals, starting the 1993–94 season with a hat-trick against Arsenal in a 3–0 away win at Highbury – the first game to be played at a remodelled all-seater Arsenal stadium. During the first half of the season, manager Bobby Gould, who had signed Quinn for Coventry, resigned and was succeeded by Phil Neal.

Quinn had been seriously considered for inclusion into the England squad in early 1993, at a time when Alan Shearer and David Hirst were both unavailable due to injury, but the rumoured international call up from Graham Taylor never materialised. Quinn had already been approached by Jack Charlton with a view to playing for the Republic of Ireland, but was not able to do so as his closest Irish-born relative was a great-grandfather and any player representing the Republic of Ireland would need at least one Irish-born grandparent. He was also eligible to play for the Italy national team, due to having an Italian-born grandfather.

However, Quinn was dropped just three games into the 1994–95 season after falling out with Neal, following his dismissal against Blackburn Rovers in the third game of the season and soon afterwards, Quinn was pushed further down the pecking order by the arrival of £2 million striker Dion Dublin, who had arrived from Manchester United. He then handed in a transfer request.

=== Later career ===
Quinn then had unproductive loan spells with Plymouth Argyle in November 1994, and Watford in March 1995, before newly appointed manager Ron Atkinson released him on 1 May 1995, the day before his 33rd birthday. After leaving Coventry, Quinn had a brief spell playing in Greece at PAOK. Shortly after signing for PAOK, his younger brother Sean died at the age of 25, and his mother died of cancer the following year.

Quinn left the Greek club in February 1996, and applied for the manager's job at Burnley, but it went to Adrian Heath instead, so he decided to retire from football.

== Media career ==
Quinn has since worked as a radio presenter on Talksport, where he covers both horse racing and football. Quinn appeared on the BBC's Football Focus as part of their "Cult Heroes" series in 2005, inspired by his relatively prolific two seasons at Highfield Road.

== Personal life ==
Quinn attracted the crowd chant of "Who Ate All the Pies?" due to his physique, which he used as the title of his 2003 autobiography.

In 1996, Quinn retired as a player and started a career as a racehorse trainer. He used to have stables at Newmarket in Suffolk, however had to retire due to it not being financially viable. Quinn was banned from training racehorses in 2001 after being found guilty of neglecting animals in his care. In June 2001, the Jockey Club inquiry found that three horses—Winsome George, Arab Gold, and Zola—were in poor condition with rain scald and were underweight, having been left out at grass near his Wantage stables. He was originally suspended for two and a half years, which would have kept him out of the sport until January 2004, Following an appeal, the ban was reduced to 18 months. The ban expired, and his licence was returned to him in January 2003, allowing him to resume training. Quinn returned to training, but later cited financial reasons for stepping down from the training ranks in December 2022, when his string was reduced to two horses.

== Honours ==
Individual

- PFA Team of the Year: 1986–87 Second Division, 1989–90 Second Division
- Newcastle United Player of the Year: 1989–90
