= Konstantinos Ioannou =

Greek footballer

Personal information
- Full name: Konstantinos Ioannou
- Date of birth: 5 May 1967 (age 59)
- Place of birth: Peristeri, Greece
- Position: Defender

Senior career*
Years	Team	Apps	(Gls)
–1991	Egaleo		
1991–1994	Atromitos		
1994–1999	Apollon Smyrnis		
2000	Kalamata		
2000–2002	Apollon Smyrnis		
- * Club domestic league appearances and goals

Konstantinos Ioannou (Greek: Κωνσταντίνος Ιωάννου; born 5 May 1967) is a retired Greek football defender.
