= John Gallacher (footballer, born 1969) =

Scottish footballer

Personal information
- Date of birth: 26 January 1969 (age 56)
- Place of birth: Scotland
- Position(s): Winger

Senior career*
Years	Team	Apps	(Gls)
-1989	Falkirk		
1989-1991	Newcastle United	29	(7)
- Hartlepool United
- *Club domestic league appearances and goals

John Gallacher (born 26 January 1969) is a Scottish retired footballer.

== Career ==
In 1989, Gallacher signed for Newcastle United in the English second division. However, he left because of injury and played for English lower league side Hartlepool United before retiring. He now works as a manager at the supermarket Aldi.
