= Alexandros Alexiou =

Greek footballer and manager

Alexis Alexiou
Personal information
- Full name: Alexandros Alexiou
- Date of birth: 8 September 1963 (age 63)
- Place of birth: Thessaloniki, Greece
- Height: 1.86 m (6 ft 1 in)
- Position: Defender

Senior career*
Years	Team	Apps	(Gls)
1983–1986	Apollon Kalamarias	70	(12)
1986–1990	Olympiacos	91	(12)
1990–1997	PAOK	176	(19)
Total		337	(43)

International career
1989–1995	Greece	10	(0)

Managerial career
- 2007–2009: Greece U19
- 2010–2011: Ilioupoli
- 2011–2012: Niki Volos
- 2012–2013: Odysseas Kordelio
- 2013: Anagennisi Giannitsa
- 2013–2014: Apollon Kalamarias
- 2015: Serres
- 2015: Pierikos
- 2015: Serres
- 2015–2016: Eordaikos
- * Club domestic league appearances and goals

Alexandros "Alexis" Alexiou (Greek: Αλέξανδρος "Αλέξης" Αλεξίου; born 8 September 1963) is a Greek former footballer and manager.

Alexiou played for Apollon Kalamarias, Olympiacos, and PAOK, as well as for the national side. He competed at the 1994 FIFA World Cup and he played in 2–0 defeat against Nigeria on 30 June.
