= Dimitrios Kapetanopoulos =

Greek footballer (born 1969)

Personal information
- Date of birth: 12 April 1969 (age 57)
- Place of birth: Argos, Greece
- Height: 1.80 m (5 ft 11 in)
- Position: Defender

Senior career*
Years	Team	Apps	(Gls)
1992–1999	PAOK	185	(11)
1999–2000	Iraklis	22	(0)
2000–2002	Kalamata	36	(1)
2002	AS Kassandra	11	(0)
2003–2005	Kastoria		
2005–2006	Trikala		
- * Club domestic league appearances and goals

Dimitrios Kapetanopoulos (Greek: Δημήτριος Καπετανόπουλος; born 12 April 1969) is a retired Greek football defender.
