= Frans van Rooy =

Dutch footballer

Personal information
- Date of birth: 3 July 1963 (age 63)
- Place of birth: Woensel, Netherlands
- Position: Midfielder

Youth career
- PSV

Senior career*
Years	Team	Apps	(Gls)
1983–1986	PSV	66	(9)
1986–1991	Royal Antwerp	152	(43)
1991–1994	Standard Liège	92	(16)
1994–1995	PAOK FC	21	(7)
1995–1996	KVC Westerlo	11	(2)
Total		342	(77)
- * Club domestic league appearances and goals

Frans van Rooy (born 3 July 1963) is a Dutch former professional footballer who played as a midfielder.

== Career ==
Beginning his career at PSV, van Rooy won the Dutch Football Talent of the Year Award in 1985. He moved to Belgian club Royal Antwerp during the 1986–87 season.
