= Krzysztof Bociek =

Polish association football player

Personal information
- Date of birth: 30 March 1974 (age 52)
- Place of birth: Mielec, Poland
- Height: 1.83 m (6 ft 0 in)
- Position: Forward

Senior career*
Years	Team	Apps	(Gls)
–1994	Stal Mielec	65	(19)
1994–1995	PAOK	24	(8)
1995–1996	Stal Mielec	9	(1)
1996	FC Volendam	12	(2)
1996–1997	AZ	19	(4)
1997–1999	NEC	12	(1)
1999	FC den Bosch	15	(0)
Total		156	(35)

International career
- Poland U18
- Poland U21
- Poland Olympic
- * Club domestic league appearances and goals

Krzysztof Bociek (born 30 March 1974) is a Polish former professional footballer who played as a forward.

== Career ==
Bociek started his career with Polish side Stal Mielec, where he made 65 league appearances and scored 19 goals. In 1994, Bociek signed for Greek top flight side PAOK. In 1995, he returned to Stal Mielec in Poland. In 1996, he signed for Dutch club FC Volendam.
