= Paraschos Zouboulis =

Greek footballer and manager (born 1970)

Paris Zouboulis
Personal information
- Full name: Paraschos Zouboulis
- Date of birth: 30 August 1970 (age 56)
- Place of birth: Aridaia, Greece
- Height: 1.76 m (5 ft 9 in)
- Position: Forward

Youth career
- Doxa Exaplatanos

Senior career*
Years	Team	Apps	(Gls)
1992–1994	Edessaikos	63	(17)
1994–1999	PAOK	113	(29)
1998–1999	→ AEK Athens (loan)	17	(6)
1999–2002	Skoda Xanthi	50	(17)
2002–2003	Apollon Kalamarias	23	(8)
2003	Kerkyra	9	(0)
2003–2004	Rodos	22	(5)
2004–2005	Levadiakos	5	(2)
2005–2007	Edessaikos		
Total		302	(84)

Managerial career
- 2013–2015: Panetolikos (assistant)
- 2015–2016: AEL Limassol (assistant)
- 2016: Asteras Tripolis (assistant)
- 2017–2018: Panetolikos (assistant)
- 2019–2020: Edessaikos
- * Club domestic league appearances and goals

Paraschos "Paris" Zouboulis (Greek: Πάρης Ζουμπούλης; born 30 August 1970) is a Greek former professional footballer who played as a forward and a manager.

== Club career ==
Zoumboulis started his career from Doxa Exaplatanos of Aridaia and was transferred to Edessaikos in 1992, where he played for two seasons in the first division. This was followed by the move to PAOK, where he played until 1998. In his first season with the club of Thessaloniki, he scored 9 league goals, including two against Aris, in a 2–0 home win. The following season he scored again in another PAOK victory over Aris at Toumba Stadium by 1–0. The completion of the competitive obligations found Zoumboulis again top scorer of the club with 13 goals, a performance that at the same time elevated him to the tenth place in the table of scorers of the league.

On 3 August 1998 Zoumboulis was loaned to AEK Athens for a season in an exchange with Triantafyllos Macheridis. Despite usually playing as a substitute, he scored 6 goals in 17 appearances. The following season he was transferred to Skoda Xanthi, where in his first season he scored 11 goals in the league, a performance that brought him to the eighth place in the table of scorers together with Saša Jovanović and Frousos. In December 2001, his contract with Xanthi was expiread and then he moved to Apollon Kalamarias where he played in the second division. He then played for Kerkyra in 2003 for a while, before moving to Rodos for a season and then to Levadiakos, where he played until 2005 before returning to Edessaikos, where he ended his career in 2007. At the first division, Zoumboulis scored 71 goals in 243 appearances.

== Managerial career ==
Zoumboulis coached for the first time at Doxa Exaplatanos which participated in the local championship of the Pella. Later he was an assistant coach at Panetolikos, AEL Limassol and Asteras Tripolis, while in the summer of 2019 he took over the technical leadership of Edessaikos, from which he left in January 2020 having 9 wins, 6 draws and 4 losses in the league.
