= Goran Milanko =

Croatian footballer (born 1968)

Personal information
- Date of birth: 30 October 1968 (age 58)
- Place of birth: Split, SR Croatia
- Height: 1.83 m (6 ft 0 in)
- Position: Midfielder

Senior career*
Years	Team	Apps	(Gls)
1985–1991	Hajduk Split		
1990–1991	→ Brest (loan)		
1991–1993	Cádiz	32	(1)
1993–1994	Famalicão	15	(1)
1994–1995	PAOK	14	(1)
1995–1996	Chemnitzer FC	24	(3)
1996–1997	Rot-Weiss Essen	26	(5)
1997–2000	Hapoel Haifa	68	(7)
2000–2001	Bnei Sakhnin		
- * Club domestic league appearances and goals

Goran Milanko (born 30 October 1968) is a Croatian former professional footballer who played as a midfielder.

== Career ==
Born in Split, Milanko played for Hajduk Split, Brest, Cádiz, Famalicão, PAOK, Chemnitzer FC, Rot-Weiss Essen, Hapoel Haifa and Bnei Sakhnin.
