= Vangelis Pourliotopoulos =

Greek footballer

Personal information
- Full name: Evangelos Pourliotopoulos
- Date of birth: 13 April 1969 (age 57)
- Place of birth: Thessaloniki, Greece
- Height: 1.93 m (6 ft 4 in)
- Position: Goalkeeper

Team information
- Current team: PAOK FC (Academy Director)

Senior career*
Years	Team	Apps	(Gls)
1989–1991	AO Panorama		
1991–1997	PAOK	41	(0)
1997–1999	Ionikos	66	(0)
1999–2001	Panionios	59	(0)
2001–2004	PAOK	12	(0)
2004–2006	Aris	12	(0)
2006–2007	Pierikos	0	(0)
Total		190	(0)

Managerial career
- 2016–: PAOK (Academy Director)
- * Club domestic league appearances and goals

Vangelis Pourliotopoulos (Greek: Βαγγέλης Πουρλιοτόπουλος, born 13 April 1969) is a retired Greek goalkeeper who played in the 1990s and 2000s. He played in Super League Greece for PAOK, Ionikos, Panionios and Aris. He had more than 180 appearances in the first division.

== Career ==
Pourliotopoulos was born in Thessaloniki. He started his career in the amateur club Panorama Thessaloniki. He moved to PAOK in 1992, where he played for the next five years. In 1997, he went to Ionikos, and two years later he moved to Panionios. In 2001, while he was playing in Panionios, he won the best goalkeeper award from PSAP. In summer of 2001 he returned to PAOK and played there for the next three years. The last station of his career was for Aris, in which he played during the 2004–05 season.

== Statistics by season ==
season	club	appearances
-1992	AO Panorama	
1992-93	PAOK	21
1993-94	PAOK	13
1994-95	PAOK	5
1995-96	PAOK	2
1996-97	PAOK	0
1997-98	Ionikos	33
1998-99	Ionikos	33
1999-2000	Panionios	31
2000-01	Panionios	28
2001-02	PAOK	11
2002-03	PAOK	1
2003-04	PAOK	0
2004-05	Aris	12
Total	A Ethniki	187

== Honours ==
PAOK

- Greek Cup: 2002–03

=== Individual ===
- Greek league Best Goalkeeper of the Season: 2001
