= Antonis Gioukoudis =

Greek footballer (born 1969)

Personal information
- Date of birth: 13 May 1969 (age 57)
- Place of birth: Epanomi, Thessaloniki, Greece
- Height: 1.81 m (5 ft 11 in)
- Position: Forward

Youth career
- –1987: Anagennisi Epanomi

Senior career*
Years	Team	Apps	(Gls)
1987–1993	Aris	162	(41)
1993–1997	PAOK	99	(12)
1997–1998	Poseidon Nea Michaniona		

International career
1992	Greece	1	(0)
- * Club domestic league appearances and goals

Antonis Gioukoudis (Greek: Αντώνης Γιουκούδης; born 13 May 1969) is a Greek former footballer who played as a forward. He spent ten years playing in the Alpha Ethniki for Aris Thessaloniki and PAOK, and made an appearance for the Greece national team.

== Career ==
Gioukoudis joined Aris Thessaloniki from Anagennisi Epanomi in 1987. He made his sole appearance for Greece in January 1992, in a friendly against Albania. In the summer of 1993 he joined PAOK, where he made 125 appearances. He finished his career at Poseidon in 1998.
