= Kleanthis Vikelidis Stadium =

Football stadium in Thessaloniki, Greece

Coordinates: 40°36′0″N 22°58′10″E

- Charilaou
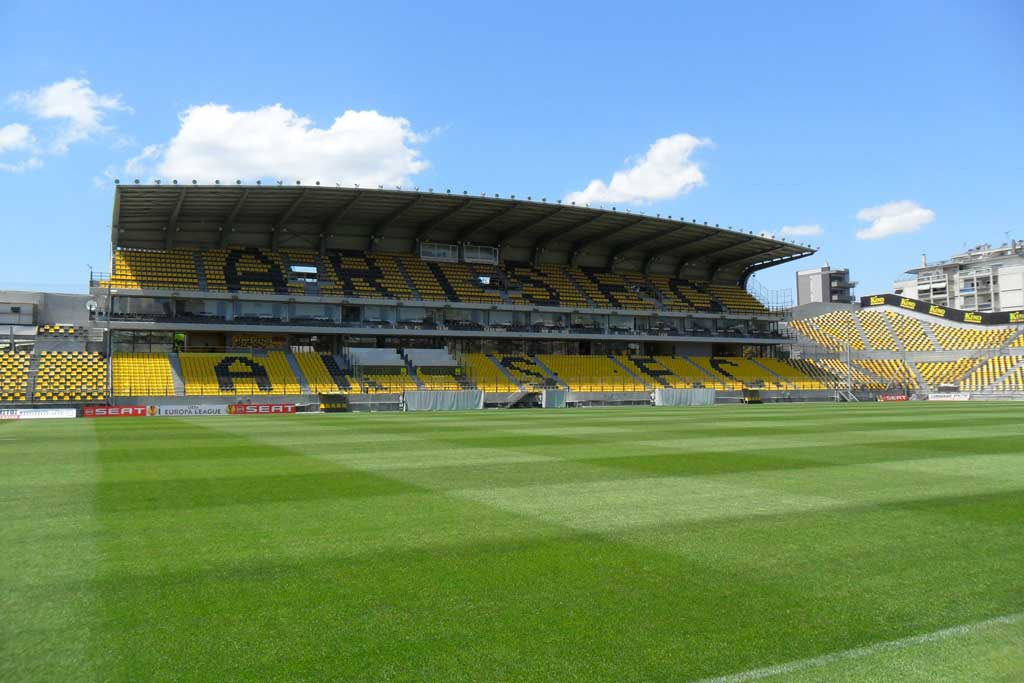
- Interactive map of Kleanthis Vikelidis Stadium
- Location: Thessaloniki, Greece
- Owner: AC Aris Thessaloniki
- Operator: Aris Thessaloniki FC
- Capacity: 22,800
- Surface: Hybrid Grass
- Scoreboard: Yes
- Public transit: Nea Elvetia metro station

Construction
- Groundbreaking: 1951
- Opened: 6 November 1951
- Renovated: 2004, 2019
- Architect: Kostas Philippou

Tenant
- Aris (1951–present)

The Kleanthis Vikelidis Stadium (Greek: Στάδιο Κλεάνθης Βικελίδης) or Charilaou Ground (Γήπεδο Χαριλάου) is a football stadium in Thessaloniki, Greece. It was built in 1951 as the home stadium of Aris, one of the most popular football clubs in Greece. For many years, the ground's official name was Aris Stadium, until it was renamed in honour of Kleanthis Vikelidis, a legendary player of Aris FC in the 1930s. However, most commonly referred to as "Charilaou Stadium", after the district in which it was built. The stadium's capacity was 23,200 although it got limited to 22,800 after the renovations for the 2004 Summer Olympics, where it served as a training ground for Football at the 2004 Summer Olympics. Its facilities include dressing rooms, a gym, a swimming pool, VIP boxes, a VIP lounge, a restaurant with pitch view and press rooms. The capacity of the stadium is 22,800.

== History ==
The football stadium opened in 1951. The expansion of the stadium took place in stages. In 1969 it was moved for the first time to a grass surface. In 1972, the grandstand was roofed in the West. The North Stand, which is the home crowd reserved, was completed 1975. During the Olympic football tournaments of the 2004 Summer Olympics, modernization measures were adopted.

== Architecture ==
The Charilaou is a pure football stadium without running track for athletics competitions. The most obvious change after the renovation of 2004 was the establishment of a new grandstand. This is in contrast to the old holding a top rank, is what defined by a tier of boxes from the lower part.

The stadium got new seats, which are the club colors of yellow and black. In addition, the grids were in front of the side stands, which separated the stands from the field, removed and, at the point where the local fans are housed by plexiglas.

The stadium sometimes is called by the Aris fans as "La Bombonera", inspired by the emblematic home ground of Boca Juniors, a friendly club of Aris, who play often friendly matches with. It is related also with the atmosphere created by Aris fans.

== Future development ==
Owner Karipidis plans to demolish the existing stands and rebuild the stadium to modern standards. The New capacity would be around 30,000 and the development in excess of €50 million.

== Other uses ==
Below the grandstand, is located -next to the dressing rooms- a sports hall and a sports pool, which serves the swimming department of Aris Thessaloniki as a training facility. In addition, the stadium has a restaurant, cafes and catering areas for VIPs.

== Gallery ==
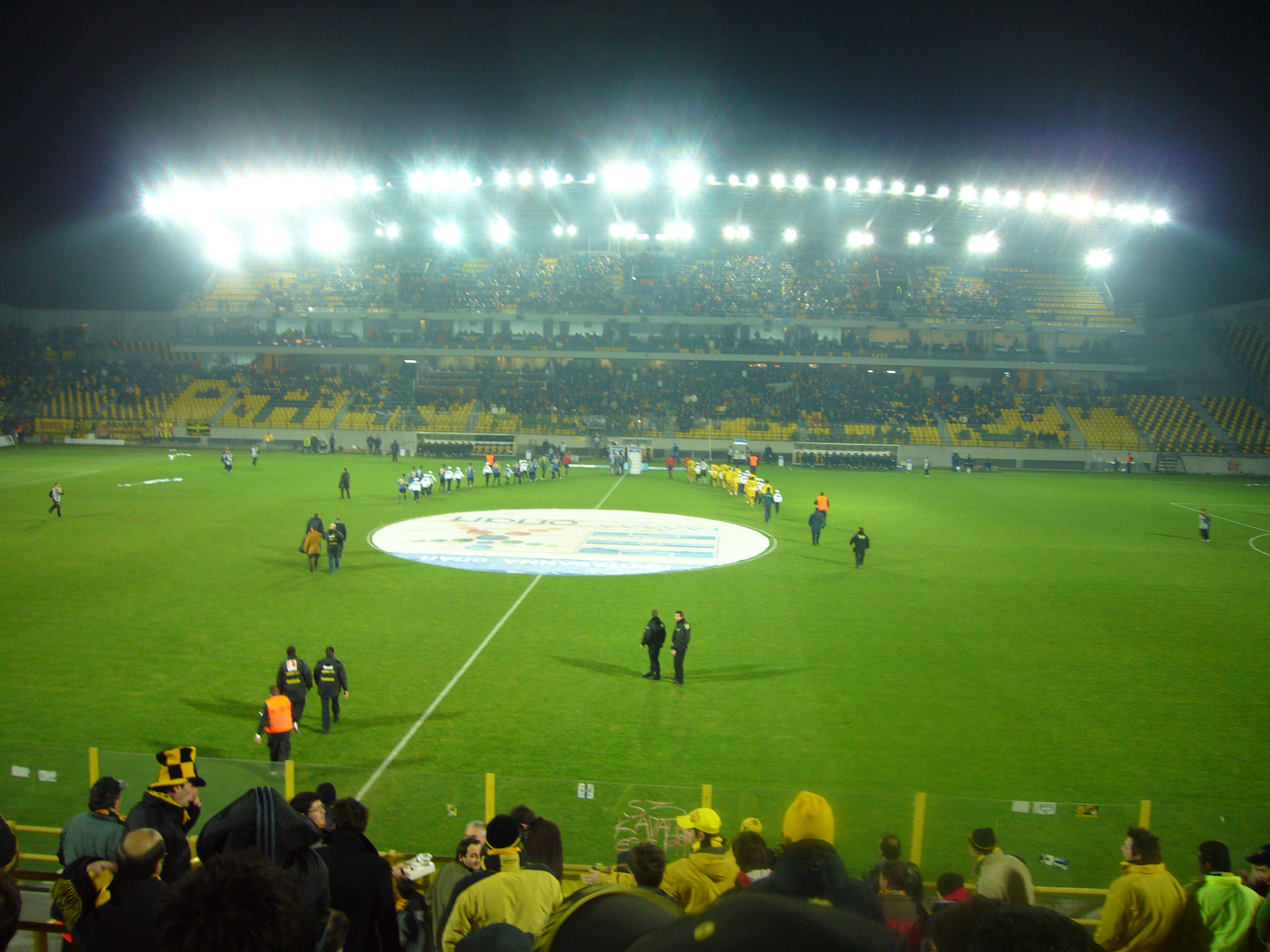
Kleanthis Vikelidis Stadium

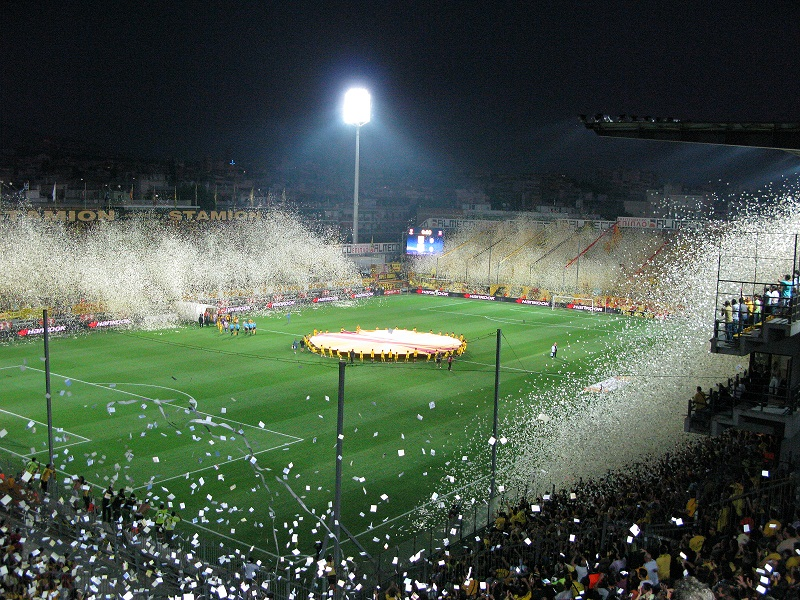
Kleanthis Vikelidis Stadium during Aris - Atlético Madrid game

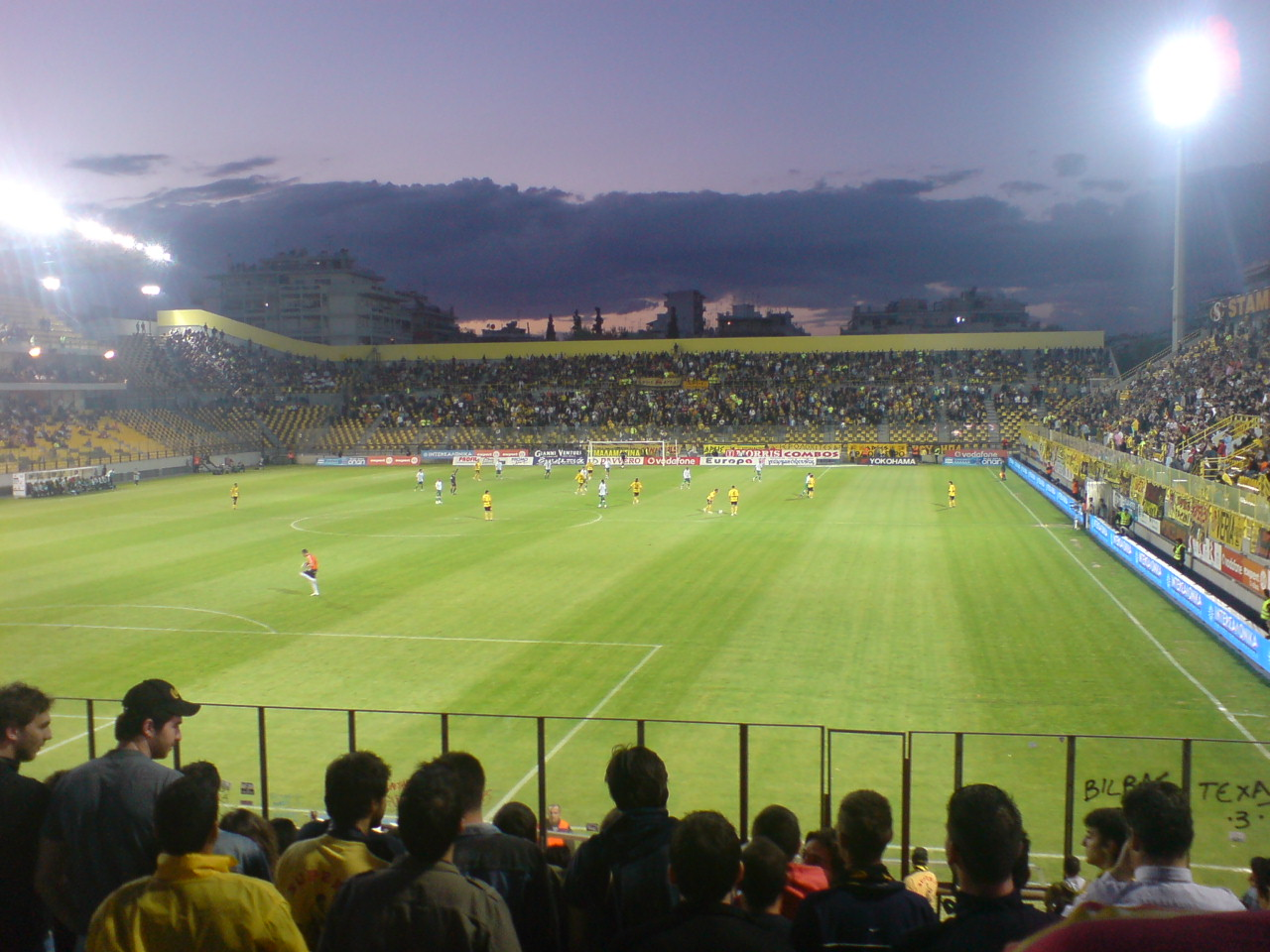
Kleanthis Vikelidis Stadium during a game of Aris at 2008

== See also ==
- List of football stadiums in Greece
- Lists of stadiums
