= 2003–04 AEK Athens F.C. season =

AEK Athens
2003–04 season
- Chairman: Giannis Granitsas (until 9 March); Kostas Generakis (until 28 May)
- Manager: Dušan Bajević (until 26 January); Dimitris Bouroutzikas (interim, until 1 February); Ilie Dumitrescu
- Stadium: Nea Smyrni Stadium; Giannis Pathiakakis Stadium; Leoforos Alexandras Stadium; Tavros Stadium; Grigoris Lambrakis Stadium
- Alpha Ethniki: 4th
- Greek Cup: Semi-finals
- UEFA Champions League: Group stage
- Top goalscorer: League: Nikos Liberopoulos (13); All: Nikos Liberopoulos (17)
- Highest home attendance: 16,045* vs Grasshopper (27 August 2003); *Leoforos Alexandras Stadium
- Lowest home attendance: 388** vs Doxa Drama (2 September 2003); **Nea Smyrni Stadium
- Average home league attendance: 2,012
- Biggest win: Akratitos 2–7 AEK Athens
- Biggest defeat: Monaco 4–0 AEK Athens
Home colours	Away colours	Third colours

The 2003–04 season was the 80th season in the existence of AEK Athens F.C. and the 45th consecutive season in the top flight of Greek football. They competed in the Alpha Ethniki, the Greek Cup and the UEFA Champions League. The season began on 17 August 2003 and finished on 22 May 2004.

== Kits ==
Supplier: Nike
Sponsor(s): Piraeus Bank
Features: TIM

Home	Away	Third

== Overview ==
The summer of 2003 started with severe financial and administrative problems for another season in the history of AEK. The administration of the court of first instance was trying to put the club in an order after the "mess" that was created by Makis Psomiadis and things were difficult, while the star player of the team, Demis Nikolaidis also left for Atlético Madrid. The situation seemed disappointing, but suddenly, in the summer, the climate reversed after some strong transfers were made with the acquisition of Nikos Liberopoulos and Ioannis Okkas with the help of the outsider, Dimitris Melissanidis, while almost all the main players of the previous season remained within the roster.

Despite the roster being capable, the atmosphere within the team was bad, which resulted in their display of a bad image in the season. The players were unpaid, Bajević was permanently at odds with some of the supporters, without showing that he was the manager he used to be, and as if all this was not enough, the team was roaming around various stadiums in Attica, since the Nikos Goumas Stadium was demolished. The result was the resignation of Bajević during the 18th matchday. With the assumption of the technical leadership by the Romanian Ilie Dumitrescu, AEK eventually finished at the 4th place of the league with the players presenting themselves far below their value and the team looking disjointed and weak throughout during the season.

AEK had the opportunity to compete for the second consecutive season in the Champions League group stage, and the need for this to happen became even more imperative for financial reasons, since the team was facing huge financial problems. On their way, the Swiss Grasshopper and the yellow-blacks were considered favorites for qualification. In the first match at the Hardturm, the AEK did not appear ready and the Swiss had the upper hand and even if they became more threatening offensively in the second half, the Swiss team scored, the match ended 1–0 and things became difficult for the Greek team. The rematch that took place at the Leoforos Alexandras Stadium with AEK entering the match very strongly and with 2 goals and an own goal were already getting a qualifying score by the 39th minute. In the second half, however, Grasshoppers scored and in the last minutes the Swiss team put a lot of pressure on the Greek team without finally being able to score the goal that would have given them qualification. Thus, AEK qualified for a second year in a row in the group stage of the Champions League and were drawn with Monaco, Deportivo La Coruña and PSV Eindhoven, where they finished last after 2 draws and 4 defeats.

In the Greek Cup, AEK first eliminated Doxa Drama then they qualified without an opponent to the Round of 16, where they also eliminated Agrotikos Asteras and then they faced Iraklis, where they also got an easy qualification. In the semi-finals AEK came across Panathinaikos. The first match at the Leoforos Alexandras Stadium ended 2–2 with both teams scoring one goal each towards the end of the match. In the rematch at Giannis Pathiakakis Stadium, the yellow-blacks appeared inferior to the circumstances, ultimately losing with 0–1 and thus they were eliminated from the final.

As the season progressed, the team's financial and administrative situation appeared to have reached their limits, with the result that the very existence of the club was threatened. Top scorer of this bad season in the league for AEK, Nikos Liberopoulos with 13 goals, while Vasilios Lakis scored 10 goals.

== Management team ==
Position	Staff
Manager	(Romania) Ilie Dumitrescu
Assistant manager	(Romania) Gheorghe Popescu
Fitness coach	(Cyprus) Antonis Kezos
Technical director	(Netherlands) Eugène Gerards
Academy director	(Greece) Andreas Stamatiadis
Academy manager	(Greece) Giorgos Karafeskos
Scout	(Netherlands) Eugène Gerards
Head of Medical	(Greece) Lakis Nikolaou

== Players ==
=== Squad information ===
NOTE: The players are the ones that have been announced by the AEK Athens' press release. No edits should be made unless a player arrival or exit is announced. Updated 22 May 2004, 23:59 UTC+3.

No.	Player	Nat.	Position(s)	Date of birth (Age)	Signed	Previous club	Transfer fee	Contract until
Goalkeepers
1	Chrysostomos Michailidis	(Greece)	GK	15 January 1975 (aged 29)	1997	(Greece) Eordaikos	Free	2005
12	Sotiris Liberopoulos	(Greece)	GK	29 June 1977 (aged 27)	2001	(Greece) Kalamata	Free	2005
22	Dionysis Chiotis	(Greece)	GK	4 June 1977 (aged 27)	1995	(Greece) AEK Athens U20	—	2005
41	Giannis Arabatzis	(Greece)	GK	28 May 1984 (aged 20)	2002	(Greece) Enosi Apostolou Pavlou	€22,000	2007
Defenders
2	Vasilios Borbokis	(Greece)	RB / RM	10 February 1969 (aged 35)	2002	(Greece) PAOK	Free	2004
5	Nikos Kostenoglou (Vice-captain 2)	(Greece)	CB / RB	3 October 1970 (aged 33)	1994	(Greece) Skoda Xanthi	€200,000	2005
8	Michel Kreek	(Netherlands)	LB / CB / LM / CM / DM	16 January 1971 (aged 33)	2002	(Netherlands) Vitesse	€500,000	2004
16	Nikolaos Georgeas	(Greece)	RB / LB / DM	27 December 1976 (aged 27)	2001	(Greece) Kalamata	€1,500,000	2007
17	Michalis Kasapis (Captain)	(Greece)	LB / LM	6 August 1971 (aged 32)	1993	(Greece) Levadiakos	€75,000	2006
18	Vangelis Moras	(Greece)	CB / DM / RB	26 August 1981 (aged 22)	2003	(Greece) Proodeftiki	€260,000	2007
19	Kofi Amponsah	(Ghana)	CB / LB	19 April 1978 (aged 26)	2003	(Greece) PAOK	Free	2006
25	Goran Popov	(North Macedonia)	LB / CB / RB	2 October 1984 (aged 19)	2004	(North Macedonia) Belasica	€50,000	2004
32	Michalis Kapsis	(Greece)	CB	18 October 1973 (aged 30)	1999	(Greece) Ethnikos Piraeus	€250,000	2007
38	Panagiotis Stergiatos	(Greece)	CB	3 March 1986 (aged 18)	2003	(Greece) AEK Athens U20	—	2008
39	Grigoris Toskas	(Greece)	CB	8 January 1983 (aged 21)	2000	(Greece) AEK Athens U20	—	2005
81	Stathis Kappos	(Greece) (Canada)	RB	31 July 1979 (aged 24)	2001	(Greece) Kalamata	Free	2005
Midfielders
3	Milen Petkov	(Bulgaria)	DM / CM / AM / RM / LM	12 January 1974 (aged 30)	2000	(Bulgaria) CSKA Sofia	€800,000	2004
6	Theodoros Zagorakis	(Greece)	CM / DM / AM / RM / CB / RB	27 October 1971 (aged 32)	2000	(England) Leicester City	Free	2005
10	Vasilios Tsiartas (Vice-captain)	(Greece)	AM / RM / LM / SS	12 November 1972 (aged 31)	2000	(Spain) Sevilla	€3,500,000	2006
14	Ivan Rusev	(Bulgaria)	AM / RM / LM / CM	10 May 1979 (aged 25)	2001	(Bulgaria) Spartak Varna	Free	2005
21	Kostas Katsouranis	(Greece)	CM / DM / RM / LM / AM / CB / RB / LB	21 June 1979 (aged 25)	2002	(Greece) Panachaiki	Free	2005
23	Vasilios Lakis	(Greece)	RM / RW / AM / CM / RB	10 September 1976 (aged 27)	1998	(Greece) Paniliakos	€1,000,000	2007
35	Dimitris Karameris	(Greece)	CM / DM	16 April 1983 (aged 21)	2000	(Greece) AEK Athens U20	—	2005
40	Christos Tsevas	(Greece)	AM	8 June 1985 (aged 19)	2003	(Greece) AEK Athens U20	—	2008
—	Peter Philipakos	(United States) (Greece)	RM / AM	21 January 1983 (aged 21)	2004	(United States) American Eagles	Free	2005
Forwards
9	Ioannis Okkas	(Cyprus)	ST / RW / LW / SS / AM	15 December 1974 (aged 29)	2003	(Greece) PAOK	Free	2005
20	Sotiris Konstantinidis	(Greece)	RW / LW / RM / LM / AM	19 April 1979 (aged 25)	1999	(Greece) Iraklis	Free	2007
26	Christos Kostis	(Greece)	SS / ST / AM / RW / LW	15 January 1972 (aged 32)	2000	(Belgium) Anderlecht	Free	2005
30	Ilija Ivić	(Serbia and Montenegro)	ST / LW	17 February 1971 (aged 33)	2002	(Greece) Aris	Free	2006
33	Nikos Liberopoulos	(Greece)	SS / ST / AM	4 August 1975 (aged 28)	2003	(Greece) Panathinaikos	Free	2006
88	Dimitris Nalitzis	(Greece)	ST	25 January 1976 (aged 28)	2003	(Italy) Udinese	€200,000	2007
Left during Winter Transfer Window
31	Grigoris Georgatos	(Greece)	LB / LM / LW / CM	31 October 1972 (aged 31)	2002	(Italy) Internazionale	€3,000,000	2005
—	Stelios Maistrellis	(Greece)	CB	10 November 1979 (aged 24)	2002	(Greece) Aiolikos	Free	2006
7	Christos Maladenis	(Greece)	CM / RM / LM / AM / DM / RW / LW / SS	23 May 1974 (aged 30)	1995	(Greece) Skoda Xanthi	€300,000	2005
34	Nikos Pourtoulidis	(Greece)	CM / AM	7 October 1983 (aged 20)	2002	(Greece) Nea Karvali	Free	2006
36	Anastasios Thanos	(Greece)	ST	1 April 1984 (aged 20)	2003	(Greece) AEK Athens U20	—	2004

== Transfers ==
=== In ===
==== Summer ====
No.	Pos.	Player	From	Fee	Date	Contract Until	Source
9	FW	(Cyprus) Ioannis Okkas	(Greece) PAOK	Free transfer	1 July 2003	30 June 2005	
18	DF	(Greece) Vangelis Moras	(Greece) Proodeftiki	€260,000^{[a]}	6 August 2003	30 June 2007	
19	DF	(Ghana) Kofi Amponsah	(Greece) PAOK	Free transfer	31 July 2003	30 June 2006	
33	FW	(Greece) Nikos Liberopoulos	(Greece) Panathinaikos	Free transfer	31 July 2003	30 June 2006	
36	FW	(Greece) Anastasios Thanos	(Greece) AEK Athens U20	Promotion	1 July 2003	30 June 2004	
38	DF	(Greece) Panagiotis Stergiatos	(Greece) AEK Athens U20	Promotion	24 June 2003	30 June 2008	
40	MF	(Greece) Christos Tsevas	(Greece) AEK Athens U20	Promotion	25 June 2003	30 June 2008	
88	FW	(Greece) Dimitris Nalitzis	(Italy) Udinese	€200,000	4 July 2003	30 June 2007	

==== Winter ====
No.	Pos.	Player	From	Fee	Date	Contract Until	Source
—	MF	(United States) Peter Philipakos	(United States) American Eagles	Free transfer	9 January 2004	30 June 2005	

=== Out ===
==== Summer ====
No.	Pos.	Player	To	Fee	Date	Source
11	FW	(Greece) Demis Nikolaidis	(Spain) Atlético Madrid	Contract termination	11 July 2003	
13	MF	(Greece) Giorgos Passios	Free agent	Contact termination	17 July 2003	
15	FW	(Argentina) Livio Prieto	(Argentina) Nueva Chicago	Contract termination	14 July 2003	
18	MF	(Costa Rica) Walter Centeno	(Costa Rica) Saprissa	Contract termination	14 July 2003	
19	DF	(Costa Rica) Mauricio Wright	(China) Shenyang Ginde	Contract termination	18 August 2003	
37	FW	(Greece) Dimitris Nalitzis	(Italy) Udinese	Loan return	1 July 2003	

==== Winter ====
No.	Pos.	Player	To	Fee	Date	Source
7	MF	(Greece) Christos Maladenis	(Greece) PAOK	Contract termination	30 January 2004	
31	DF	(Greece) Grigoris Georgatos	(Greece) Olympiacos	Contract termination^{[b]}	1 January 2004	
36	FW	(Greece) Anastasios Thanos	(Greece) Proodeftiki	Contract termination	13 January 2004	

Notes

a. Plus 25% of resale.

b. The player paid €400,000 to the club for his contract termination so he could rejoin Olympiacos.

=== Loan in ===
==== Winter ====
No.	Pos.	Player	From	Fee	Date	Until	Option to buy	Source
25	DF	(North Macedonia) Goran Popov	(North Macedonia) Belasica	€50,000	9 January 2004	30 June 2004	✓	

=== Loan out ===
==== Summer ====
No.	Pos.	Player	To	Fee	Date	Until	Option to buy	Source
20	FW	(Greece) Ilias Solakis	(Greece) Niki Volos	Free	1 July 2003	30 June 2004	✗	

==== Winter ====
No.	Pos.	Player	To	Fee	Date	Until	Option to buy	Source
34	MF	(Greece) Nikos Pourtoulidis	(Greece) Thrasyvoulos	Free	19 January 2004	30 June 2005	✗	
—	DF	(Greece) Stelios Maistrellis	(Greece) Akratitos	Free	26 January 2004	30 June 2004	✗	

=== Contract renewals ===
No.	Pos.	Player	Date	Former Exp. Date	New Exp. Date	Source
2	DF	(Greece) Vasilios Borbokis	11 June 2003	30 June 2003	30 June 2004	
3	MF	(Bulgaria) Milen Petkov	25 June 2003	30 June 2003	30 June 2004	
5	DF	(Greece) Nikos Kostenoglou	11 June 2003	30 June 2003	30 June 2005	
6	MF	(Greece) Theodoros Zagorakis	9 June 2003	30 June 2003	30 June 2005	
7	MF	(Greece) Christos Maladenis	11 June 2003	30 June 2003	30 June 2005	
10	MF	(Greece) Vasilios Tsiartas	2 July 2003	30 June 2003	30 June 2006	
16	DF	(Greece) Nikolaos Georgeas	4 January 2004	31 December 2004	31 December 2007	
20	FW	(Greece) Sotiris Konstantinidis	30 December 2003	30 June 2004	30 June 2007	
23	MF	(Greece) Vasilios Lakis	3 June 2003	30 June 2003	30 June 2007	
30	FW	(Serbia and Montenegro) Ilija Ivić	11 June 2003	30 June 2005	30 June 2006	
32	DF	(Greece) Michalis Kapsis	3 October 2003	31 December 2003	30 June 2007	

=== Overall transfer activity ===
==== Expenditure ====
Summer: ▼€460,000

Winter: ▼€50,000

Total: ▼€510,000

==== Income ====
Summer: ▲€0

Winter: ▲€0

Total: ▲€0

==== Net Totals ====
Summer: ▼€460,000

Winter: ▼€50,000

Total: ▼€510,000

== Pre-season and friendlies ==
9 July 2003 Friendly	Teplice	0–0	AEK Athens	Leutasch
19:30 EEST (UTC+3)	Rada (red card) 85'	Report		Stadium: Farchant Stadium

12 July 2003 Friendly	Axams	2–6	AEK Athens	Seefeld
19:30 EEST (UTC+3)	65'; 70'	Report	Tsevas 12'; Borbokis 21', (penalty missed) 44'; Tsiartas 73' (pen.), 84'; Georgatos 77'; Lakis 80'	Stadium: Axams Ruifach Stadium

15 July 2003 Friendly	Slavia Prague	1–0	AEK Athens	Leutasch
19:30 EEST (UTC+3)	Kincl 75'	Report		Stadium: Farchant Stadium

17 July 2003 Friendly	Maccabi Tel Aviv	1–3	AEK Athens	Seefeld
19:30 EEST (UTC+3)	Prohorenkovs 60'	Report	Nalitzis 10'; Maladenis 40'; Ivić 64'	Stadium: Axams Ruifach Stadium

21 July 2003 Friendly	AEK Athens	3–0	Steaua București	Ampelokipoi
21:30 EEST (UTC+3)	Katsouranis 16'; Stoica 34' (o.g.); Dumitru 59' (o.g.)	Report		Stadium: Leoforos Alexandras Stadium; Attendance: 9,400

24 July 2003 Friendly	AEK Athens	2–1	Chalkidona	Korydallos
18:30 EEST (UTC+3)	Okkas 18'; Georgatos 19'	Report	Drenova 65'	Stadium: Korydallos Stadium; Attendance: 700; Referee: Michalis Germanakos (Athens)

28 July 2003 Friendly	Proodeftiki	1–3	AEK Athens	Korydallos
18:30 EEST (UTC+3)	Rush 75'	Report	Tsiartas 17'; Georgatos 44', 64'	Stadium: Korydallos Stadium

1 August 2003 Friendly	Apollon Smyrnis	2–4	AEK Athens	Rizoupoli
21:00 EEST (UTC+3)	Stratis 32'; Karademitros 76'	Report	Maladenis 37'; Konstantinidis 77', 80'; Vitzekas 87' (o.g.)	Stadium: Georgios Kamaras Stadium; Attendance: 3,000

7 September 2003 Friendly	AEL Limassol	3–2	AEK Athens	Limassol
19:00 EEST (UTC+3)	Carabaș 51'; N'Diaye 59'; Christofi 89'	Report	Ivić 35'; Nalitzis 57'; Konstantinidis (penalty missed) 82'	Stadium: Tsirio Stadium

15 November 2003 Friendly	Fostiras	1–1	AEK Athens	Tavros
15:00 EET (UTC+2)	Ziokos 85'	Report	Tsevas 52'	Stadium: Tavros Stadium; Attendance: 1,000

== Competitions ==
=== Overall record ===
Competition	First match	Last match	Starting round	Final position	Record							
Competition	First match	Last match	Starting round	Final position	Pld	W	D	L	GF	GA	GD	Win %
Alpha Ethniki	23 August 2003	22 May 2004	Matchday 1	4th	30	16	7	7	57	32	+25	53.33
Greek Cup	17 August 2003	7 April 2004	First round	Semi-finals	8	5	2	1	17	7	+10	62.50
UEFA Champions League	13 August 2003	10 December 2003	Third qualifying round	Group stage	8	1	2	5	4	13	−9	12.50
Total					46	22	11	13	78	52	+26	47.83

Last updated: 22 May 2004
Source: Competitions

=== Alpha Ethniki ===
==== League table ====
Pos	Team	Pld	W	D	L	GF	GA	GD	Pts	Qualification or relegation
2	Olympiacos	30	24	3	3	70	19	+51	75	Qualification for Champions League group stage
3	PAOK	30	18	6	6	47	27	+20	60	Qualification for Champions League third qualifying round
4	AEK Athens	30	16	7	7	57	32	+25	55	Qualification for UEFA Cup first round
5	Egaleo	30	15	7	8	37	26	+11	52	Qualification for UEFA Cup first round
6	Panionios	30	12	11	7	40	29	+11	47	Qualification for UEFA Cup first round

Source: Galanis Sports Data
Rules for classification: 1st points; 2nd head-to-head points; 3rd head-to-head goal difference; 4th decision match.

==== Results summary ====
Overall								Home						Away					
Pld	W	D	L	GF	GA	GD	Pts	W	D	L	GF	GA	GD	W	D	L	GF	GA	GD
30	16	7	7	57	32	+25	55	7	5	3	27	13	+14	9	2	4	30	19	+11

Source: Competitive matches

==== Results by Matchday ====
Round	1	2	3	4	5	6	7	8	9	10	11	12	13	14	15	16	17	18	19	20	21	22	23	24	25	26	27	28	29	30
Ground	A	H	A	H	A	H	A	H	H	A	H	A	H	A	H	H	A	H	A	H	A	H	A	A	H	A	H	A	H	A
Result	W	W	D	D	D	L	W	L	W	W	W	L	W	W	D	D	W	W	L	L	L	W	W	L	D	W	W	W	D	W
Position	5	2	2	4	4	6	6	6	5	5	5	5	5	5	5	5	4	4	5	5	5	5	5	5	5	5	5	4	4	4

Source: Competitive matches
A = Away; H = Home; W = Win; D = Draw; L = Loss; P = Postponed

==== Matches ====
23 August 2003 1	Egaleo	0–1	AEK Athens	Egaleo
21:00 EEST (UTC+3)	Fotakis (yellow card) 73'; Psomas (yellow card) 73'		Amponsah (yellow card) 14'; Okkas 19'; Maladenis (yellow card) 61'; Liberopoulos (yellow card) 89'	Stadium: Stavros Mavrothalassitis Stadium; Attendance: 2,606; Referee: Vasilis Terovitsas (Aetoloacarnania)

31 August 2003 2	AEK Athens	3–0	Ionikos	Nea Smyrni
21:15 EEST (UTC+3)	Maladenis 20'; Katsouranis (yellow card) 21'; Borbokis (yellow card) 44'; Ivić 39', 79' (pen.)		Frousos (yellow card) 22'; Ferekidis (yellow card) 23'; Makor (yellow card) 25' (yellow-red card) 44'; Koné (yellow card) 89'	Stadium: Nea Smyrni Stadium; Attendance: 3,480; Referee: Avraam Kebaridis (Thessaloniki)

13 September 2003 3	Iraklis	2–2	AEK Athens	Thessaloniki
19:00 EEST (UTC+3)	Fofonka (yellow card) 11'; Ioannou (yellow card) 26' (yellow-red card) 62'; Katsabis (yellow card) 27'; Mięciel 77'; Drougas 84'		Georgatos 6'; Kapsis (yellow card) 23'; Kreek (yellow card) 26'; Katsouranis (yellow card) 38', (goal) 81'; Okkas (yellow card) 45+1'; Ivić (yellow card) 90+2'	Stadium: Makedonikos Stadium; Attendance: 4,677; Referee: Thanasis Briakos (Epirus)

21 September 2003 4	AEK Athens	2–2	Panathinaikos	Nea Smyrni
21:00 EEST (UTC+3)	Chiotis (yellow card) 29'; Georgatos 43', 88', (yellow card) 90+3'; Kostenoglou (yellow card) 45+3'; Moras (yellow card) 54'; Tsiartas (penalty missed) 84'		Kyrgiakos 20', (yellow card) 83'; Fyssas 28', (yellow card) 45+3'; Konstantinou (yellow card) 36'; Seitaridis (yellow card) 44' (yellow-red card) 45+1'; Henriksen (yellow card) 69'	Stadium: Nea Smyrni Stadium; Attendance: 9,472; Referee: Makis Efthimiadis (Drama)
Note: Both teams were punished due to fan incidents.

27 September 2003 5	Panionios	2–2	AEK Athens	Nea Smyrni
19:00 EEST (UTC+3)	Raguel 43'; Parodi (yellow card) 49'; Katsouranis 75' (o.g.)		Amponsah (yellow card) 34'; Borbokis (yellow card) 56'; Georgatos 60', 90+4'; Maladenis (yellow card) 66'	Stadium: Nea Smyrni Stadium; Attendance: 2,100; Referee: Giorgos Borovilos (Arcadia)

15 October 2003 6	AEK Athens	1–2	Chalkidona	Nea Smyrni
21:00 EEST (UTC+3)	Moras (yellow card) 86'; Kasapis (yellow card) 87'; Ivić 90+2'		Korakakis (yellow card) 31', (goal) 74'; Manousakis (yellow card) 32', (goal) 55'; Dimos (yellow card) 65'; Ebéde (yellow card) 90'	Stadium: Nea Smyrni Stadium; Attendance: Behind closed doors Referee: Efthimios Damianos (Kozani)
Note: The match was held behind closed doors, due to the punishment for the match against Panathinaikos.

18 October 2003 7	Aris	1–2	AEK Athens	Thessaloniki
17:00 EEST (UTC+3)	Lazanas (yellow card) 28', (goal) 49'; Koltsidas (yellow card) 69'		Georgeas (yellow card) 23'; Zagorakis (yellow card) 42'; Konstantinidis 45'; Liberopoulos 54'; Kasapis (yellow card) 80'; Okkas (yellow card) 90+4'	Stadium: Makedonikos Stadium; Attendance: 1,181; Referee: Giannis Spyropoulos (Phthiotis)

26 October 2003 8	AEK Athens	0–1	Olympiacos	Nea Smyrni
21:00 EET (UTC+2)	Maladenis (yellow card) 25'; Borbokis (yellow card) 45+1'; Okkas (yellow card) 80'; Georgeas (yellow card) 90'		Pantos (yellow card) 12' (yellow-red card) 61'; Antzas (yellow card) 23'; Stoltidis 67'; Gonias (yellow card) 77'; Karembeu (yellow card) 87'	Stadium: Nea Smyrni Stadium; Attendance: 8,310; Referee: Thanasis Briakos (Epirus)
Note: AEK was punished with 3 games behind closed doors due to fan incidents.

1 November 2003 9	AEK Athens	3–1	PAOK	Ano Liosia
19:30 EET (UTC+2)	Liberopoulos 16'; Okkas (yellow card) 25', (goal) 63'; Rusev (yellow card) 39'; Konstantinidis (yellow card) 50'; Lakis 90'		Koutsopoulos (yellow card) 49'; Zavantias (yellow card) 65'; Salpingidis 83'; Vangelis (yellow card) 84'	Stadium: Giannis Pathiakakis Stadium; Attendance: 2,134; Referee: Makis Efthimiadis (Drama)

9 November 2003 10	Akratitos	2–7	AEK Athens	Ano Liosia
17:00 EET (UTC+2)	Skoufalis 3', (yellow card) 8'; Iliopoulos 14'; Damigos (yellow card) 44'		Liberopoulos 26', 52', 64'; Bletsas 34' (o.g.); Lakis 57'; Konstantinidis 76'; Nalitzis 90+2'	Stadium: Giannis Pathiakakis Stadium; Attendance: 1,348; Referee: Kostas Finokaliotis (Athens)

22 November 2003 11	AEK Athens	3–0	Proodeftiki	Ano Liosia
17:00 EET (UTC+2)	Nalitzis 38'; Okkas 59'; Katsouranis 72'			Stadium: Giannis Pathiakakis Stadium; Attendance: Behind closed doors Referee: Efthimios Damianos (Kozani)
Note: The match was held behind closed doors, due to the punishment for the match against Olympiacos.

30 November 2003 12	Paniliakos	1–0	AEK Athens	Pyrgos
17:00 EET (UTC+2)	Moysiadis (yellow card) 18'; Vyntra (yellow card) 30'; Thomaidis 60'; Tasidis (yellow card) 63'		Michailidis (yellow card) 20'; Amponsah (yellow card) 32'	Stadium: Pyrgos Stadium; Attendance: 2,143; Referee: Giannis Kaminaris (Thessaly)

7 December 2003 13	AEK Athens	3–0	Skoda Xanthi	Ampelokipoi
17:00 EET (UTC+2)	Liberopoulos 16'; Okkas 31'; Lakis 74'		Pérez (yellow card) 86'	Stadium: Leoforos Alexandras Stadium; Attendance: Behind closed doors Referee: Giorgos Douros (Corinthia)
Note: The match was held behind closed doors, due to the punishment for the match against Olympiacos.

14 December 2003 14	OFI	0–2	AEK Athens	Heraklion
18:00 EET (UTC+2)			Zagorakis (yellow card) 53'; Rusev 68'; Tsiartas 72'	Stadium: Theodoros Vardinogiannis Stadium; Attendance: 3,950; Referee: Giorgos Douros (Corinthia)

20 December 2003 15	AEK Athens	1–1	Kallithea	Tavros
14:45 EET (UTC+2)	Liberopoulos 45+1'; Lakis (yellow card) 48'; Nalitzis (yellow card) 84'		Skarmoutsos 87'	Stadium: Tavros Stadium; Attendance: Behind closed doors Referee: Dimitris Kalopoulos (Thessaloniki)
Note: The match was held behind closed doors, due to the punishment for the match against Olympiacos.

11 January 2004 16	AEK Athens	2–2	Egaleo	Ano Liosia
17:00 EET (UTC+2)	Katsouranis 39'; Liberopoulos 71'		Chatzis (yellow card) 28'; Chloros (yellow card) 52'; Psomas 65', 75'; Moustogiannis (yellow card) 88'	Stadium: Giannis Pathiakakis Stadium; Attendance: 697; Referee: Makis Efthimiadis (Drama)

18 January 2004 17	Ionikos	0–1	AEK Athens	Nikaia
17:00 EET (UTC+2)	Frousos (yellow card) 19'; Vourexakis (yellow card) 41'; Makor (yellow card) 49'		Georgeas (yellow card) 9'; Moras (yellow card) 35'; Okkas 56', (yellow card) 85'; Zagorakis (yellow card) 59'	Stadium: Neapoli Municipal Stadium; Attendance: 1,355; Referee: Giorgos Douros (Corinthia)

25 January 2004 18	AEK Athens	4–0	Iraklis	Ano Liosia
17:00 EET (UTC+2)	Katsouranis 10'; Okkas (yellow card) 55'; Petkov 59'; Lakis 87', 90+2'		Poursanidis (yellow card) 7'; Xenidis (yellow card) 25'; Murati (yellow card) 28'	Stadium: Giannis Pathiakakis Stadium; Attendance: 1,023; Referee: Giorgos Borovilos (Arcadia)
Note: At the 30th minute of the match on the stands there was a well-known banner that disapproved the coach of AEK, Dušan Bajević and in those days the administration took measures to ban its hanging on the railings. Nevertheless that banner made its appearance on the pitch again, but Bajević was bothered by a slogan that mentioned his wife. Bajević left the pitch midgame, stating that it was his last match at the club and with him the vice president, Petros Stathis resigned, as well. Bajević's assistant, Takis Persias took over for the rest of the match.

1 February 2004 19	Panathinaikos	2–1	AEK Athens	Ampelokipoi
19:30 EET (UTC+2)	Basinas 18'; Goumas (yellow card) 28'; Sapanis 68'; Michaelsen (yellow card) 71'		Amponsah (yellow card) 10' (yellow-red card) 79'; Liberopoulos 78'; Nalitzis (yellow card) 81'	Stadium: Leoforos Alexandras Stadium; Attendance: 10,645; Referee: Kyros Vassaras (Thessaloniki)

7 February 2004 20	AEK Athens	0–1	Panionios	Ano Liosia
19:00 EET (UTC+2)	Konstantinidis (yellow card) 64'		Lagonikakis (yellow card) 30' (yellow-red card) 90+2'; Parodi 80'	Stadium: Giannis Pathiakakis Stadium; Attendance: 2,594; Referee: Makis Efthimiadis (Drama)
Note: AEK were punished with 2 games behind closed doors due to fan incidents.

22 February 2004 21	Chalkidona	2–0	AEK Athens	Nikaia
20:30 EET (UTC+2)	Kogioglou (yellow card) 28'; Katemis 35'; Zacharopoulos 59'; Dagas (yellow card) 65'		Liberopoulos (yellow card) 25'; Konstantinidis (yellow card) 61'	Stadium: Neapoli Municipal Stadium; Attendance: 859; Referee: Dimitris Kalopoulos (Thessaloniki)

28 February 2004 22	AEK Athens	1–0	Aris	Ano Liosia
17:00 EET (UTC+2)	Tsiartas (penalty missed) 55'; Amponsah 90+1'		Magalefa (yellow card) 67'; Abelas (yellow card) 83'	Stadium: Giannis Pathiakakis Stadium; Attendance: Behind closed doors Referee: Nikos Koulias (Thesprotia)
Note: The match was held behind closed doors, due to the punishment for the match against Panionios.

14 March 2004 23	Olympiacos	0–1	AEK Athens	Rizoupoli
19:00 EET (UTC+2)	Pantos (yellow card) 12'; Karembeu (yellow card) 70'; Castillo (yellow card) 71'		Popov (yellow card) 11'; Okkas (yellow card) 70'; Lakis 85'	Stadium: Georgios Kamaras Stadium; Attendance: 11,311; Referee: Giorgos Kasnaferis (Argolida)

21 March 2004 24	PAOK	3–2	AEK Athens	Thessaloniki
17:00 EET (UTC+2)	Yiasoumi 45', 45+2'; Salpingidis 57'		Liberopoulos 34', 42'; Kapsis (red card) 56'; Borbokis (yellow card) 88'	Stadium: Toumba Stadium; Attendance: 24,829; Referee: Iraklis Tsikinis (Messinia)

4 April 2004 25	AEK Athens	1–1	Akratitos	Ano Liosia
18:00 EEST (UTC+3)	Lakis 80'		Lincar (yellow card) 29'; Iliopoulos 40', (yellow card) 60'; Stefanidis (yellow card) 82'	Stadium: Giannis Pathiakakis Stadium; Attendance: Behind closed doors Referee: Nikos Koulias (Thesprotia)
Note: The match was held behind closed doors, due to the punishment for the match against Panionios.

17 April 2004 26	Proodeftiki	2–4	AEK Athens	Korydallos
19:00 EEST (UTC+3)	Frantzeskos (yellow card) 25', (goal) 50'; Sidiropoulos (yellow card) 29'; Kazantzis 37'; Togias (penalty missed) 40'		Okkas (yellow card) 31'; Tsiartas 33'; Borbokis 35'; Michailidis (yellow card) 39'; Liberopoulos 69'; Ivić 82'	Stadium: Korydallos Stadium; Attendance: 1,483; Referee: Dimitris Dabosis (Pieria)

24 April 2004 27	AEK Athens	1–0	Paniliakos	Ano Liosia
19:00 EEST (UTC+3)	Liberopoulos (yellow card) 16'; Lakis 54'		Spyropoulos (yellow card) 58'; Thomaidis (yellow card) 60'	Stadium: Giannis Pathiakakis Stadium; Attendance: 1,204; Referee: Giannis Tsachilidis (Piraeus)

1 May 2004 28	Skoda Xanthi	1–2	AEK Athens	Xanthi
18:00 EEST (UTC+3)	Papadimitriou (yellow card) 35', (goal) 89' (pen.)		Liberopoulos 25'; Katsouranis (yellow card) 44', (goal) 46'; Popov (yellow card) 88'	Stadium: A.O. Xanthi Stadium; Attendance: 1,699; Referee: Dimitris Dabosis (Pieria)

16 May 2004 29	AEK Athens	2–2	OFI	Kallithea
19:00 EEST (UTC+3)	Popov (yellow card) 28' (yellow-red card) 88'; Lakis 46'; Georgeas (yellow card) 60'; Katsouranis 67'; Zagorakis (yellow card) 81'; Ivić (yellow card) 90+1'		Bykowski 5'; Deyanov 52' (pen.); Dentsas (yellow card) 67'; Belevonis (yellow card) 83'; Tomash (yellow card) 84'; Oliveira (yellow card) 85'	Stadium: Grigoris Lambrakis Stadium; Attendance: 1,287; Referee: Giannis Tsachilidis (Piraeus)

22 May 2004 30	Kallithea	1–3	AEK Athens	Kallithea
17:15 EEST (UTC+3)	Skarmoutsos 52'; Koutsospyros (yellow card) 75'; Kyriakos (yellow card) 85'		Lakis 19'; Ivić 21', (yellow card) 76'; Kostenoglou (yellow card) 62'; Katsouranis (yellow card) 88', (goal) 90+2'	Stadium: Grigoris Lambrakis Stadium; Attendance: 1,480; Referee: Nikos Koulias (Thesprotia)

=== Greek Cup ===
==== First round ====
17 August 2003 First leg	Doxa Drama	0–4	AEK Athens	Drama
17:30 EEST (UTC+3)	Moutidis (yellow card) 45'; Theodorelis (yellow card) 45'; Macheridis (yellow card) 81'	Report (page 6)	Rusev 11'; Okkas 42', 89', 90'; Borbokis (yellow card) 44'; Liberopoulos (yellow card) 55'; Amponsah (yellow card) 68'; Kreek (yellow card) 55'	Stadium: Doxa Drama Stadium; Attendance: 5,684; Referee: Manolis Tapatzas (Thrace)

2 September 2003 Second leg	AEK Athens	3–0 (7–0 agg.)	Doxa Drama	Nea Smyrni
21:00 EEST (UTC+3)	Nalitzis (penalty missed) 13'; Rusev 50'; Konstantinidis 57' (pen.); Kostis 70'	Report (page 6)	Theodorelis (yellow card) 23'; Kosmidis (yellow card) 40'; Macheridis (yellow card) 56'; Baltimas (yellow card) 85'	Stadium: Nea Smyrni Stadium; Attendance: 388; Referee: Stavros Georgopoulos (Arcadia)

==== Second round ====
AEK Athens qualified to the Round of 16 without a match.

==== Round of 16 ====
7 January 2004 First leg	Agrotikos Asteras	0–2	AEK Athens	Thessaloniki
15:00 EET (UTC+2)	Moras (yellow card) 34'; Petkov 54'; Tsiartas 90'	Report (page 15)		Stadium: Agrotikos Asteras Stadium; Referee: Manolis Tapatzas (Thrace)

14 January 2004 Second leg	AEK Athens	2–2 (4–2 agg.)	Agrotikos Asteras	Ano Liosia
20:00 EET (UTC+2)	Katsouranis 27'; Liberopoulos 90+2'	Report (page 15)	Papagiannopoulos (yellow card) 54'; Karatziotis 17'; Bekiaris 41'; Kosmidis (yellow card) 85'	Stadium: Giannis Pathiakakis Stadium; Referee: Antonis Kouklakis (Chania)

==== Quarter-finals ====
4 March 2004 First leg	AEK Athens	1–0	Iraklis	Ano Liosia
19:00 EET (UTC+2)	Tsiartas 4' (pen.); Katsouranis (yellow card) 56'	Report (page 17)	Murati (yellow card) 10'; Mięciel (yellow card) 89'	Stadium: Giannis Pathiakakis Stadium; Attendance: Behind closed doors Referee: Giannis Tsacheilidis (Piraeus)

16 March 2004 Second leg	Iraklis	2–3 (2–4 agg.)	AEK Athens	Thessaloniki
19:00 EET (UTC+2)	Ioannou 36'; Kiassos (yellow card) 65'; Mięciel 86'	Report (page 17-18)	Okkas 28'; Petkov (yellow card) 45+1'; Liberopoulos 64', 77'	Stadium: Nea Efkarpia Stadium; Attendance: 4,594; Referee: Giorgos Douros (Corinthia)

==== Semi-finals ====
27 March 2004 First leg	Panathinaikos	2–2	AEK Athens	Ampelokipoi
20:00 EEST (UTC+3)	Basinas 29' (pen.), (yellow card) 36'; Goumas (yellow card) 53'; Henriksen (yellow card) 74'; Olisadebe 90+2'; Sapanis (yellow card) 90+3'	Report (page 18)	Katsouranis 20'; Petkov (yellow card) 27' (yellow-red card) 45'; Kreek (yellow card) 55' (yellow-red card) 90'; Lakis 88'	Stadium: Leoforos Alexandras Stadium; Attendance: 8,657; Referee: Thanasis Briakos (Epirus)

7 April 2004 Second leg	AEK Athens	0–1 (2–3 agg.)	Panathinaikos	Ano Liosia
20:00 EEST (UTC+3)	Liberopoulos (yellow card) 36'; Petkov (yellow card) 64'; Ivić (yellow card) 76'	Report (page 18)	Goumas 9'; Seitaridis (yellow card) 20'; Sapanis (yellow card) 45'; Konstantinidis (yellow card) 45'; Chalkias (yellow card) 76'	Stadium: Giannis Pathiakakis Stadium; Attendance: 5,000; Referee: Christoforos Zografos (Athens)

=== UEFA Champions League ===
==== Third qualifying round ====
The draw for the third qualifying round was held on 25 July 2003.

13 August 2003 First leg	Grasshopper (Switzerland)	1–0	(Greece) AEK Athens	Zürich, Switzerland
20:30 EEST (UTC+3)	Chatruc (yellow card) 37'; Núñez 83'; Petrić (yellow card) 90+2'	Report	Georgeas (yellow card) 45'; Kapsis (yellow card) 86'	Stadium: Hardturm; Attendance: 12,400; Referee: Éric Poulat (France)

27 August 2003 Second leg	AEK Athens (Greece)	3–1 (3–2 agg.)	(Switzerland) Grasshopper	Athens, Greece
21:30 EEST (UTC+3)	Katsouranis 20'; Liberopoulos 25', (penalty missed) 76'; Georgatos (yellow card) 26'; Castillo 39' (o.g.); Borbokis (yellow card) 77'; Zagorakis (yellow card) 90+3'	Report	Gamboa (yellow card) 17'; Tararache (yellow card) 40'; Núñez 68'; Emuejeraye (yellow card) 70'; Castillo (red card) 75'	Stadium: Leoforos Alexandras Stadium; Attendance: 16,045; Referee: Lucílio Batista (Portugal)

==== Group stage ====
The draw for the group stage was held on 28 August 2003.

Pos	Team	Pld	W	D	L	GF	GA	GD	Pts	Qualification	MON	DEP	PSV	AEK
1	(France) Monaco	6	3	2	1	15	6	+9	11	Advance to knockout stage	—	8–3	1–1	4–0
2	(Spain) Deportivo La Coruña	6	3	1	2	12	12	0	10	Advance to knockout stage	1–0	—	2–0	3–0
3	(Netherlands) PSV Eindhoven	6	3	1	2	8	7	+1	10	Transfer to UEFA Cup	1–2	3–2	—	2–0
4	(Greece) AEK Athens	6	0	2	4	1	11	−10	2		0–0	1–1	0–1	—

Source: RSSSF

===== Matches =====
17 September 2003 1	AEK Athens (Greece)	1–1	(Spain) Deportivo La Coruña	Athens, Greece
21:45 EEST (UTC+3)	Liberopoulos (yellow card) 33'; Tsiartas (yellow card) 82', (goal) 86'; Okkas (yellow card) 90+1'	Report	Pandiani 12'; Sergio (yellow card) 41'; Héctor (yellow card) 43'	Stadium: Leoforos Alexandras Stadium; Attendance: 13,583; Referee: Mike McCurry (Scotland)

30 September 2003 2	Monaco (France)	4–0	(Greece) AEK Athens	Fontvieille, Monaco
21:45 EEST (UTC+3)	Giuly 23'; Morientes 25', 56'; Pršo 86'	Report	Katsouranis (yellow card) 38'; Amponsah (yellow card) 71'	Stadium: Stade Louis II; Attendance: 11,790; Referee: Stefano Farina (Italy)

21 October 2003 3	AEK Athens (Greece)	0–1	(Netherlands) PSV Eindhoven	Athens, Greece
21:45 EEST (UTC+3)	Amponsah (red card) 65'	Report	Lucius 37'; Hofland (yellow card) 48'	Stadium: Leoforos Alexandras Stadium; Attendance: 7,290; Referee: Leslie Irvine (Northern Ireland)

5 November 2003 4	PSV Eindhoven (Netherlands)	2–0	(Greece) AEK Athens	Eindhoven, Netherlands
21:45 EET (UTC+2)	Robben (yellow card) 39', (goal) 63'; Bouma 51'; Hofland (yellow card) 70'	Report	Tsiartas (yellow card) 47'	Stadium: Philips Stadion; Attendance: 28,000; Referee: Konrad Plautz (Austria)

25 November 2003 5	Deportivo La Coruña (Spain)	3–0	(Greece) AEK Athens	A Coruña, Spain
21:45 EET (UTC+2)	Héctor 22'; Valerón 51'; Luque 71'	Report	Kasapis (yellow card) 24'; Okkas (yellow card) 35'; Kostenoglou (yellow card) 46'; Amponsah (yellow card) 86'	Stadium: Estadio Riazor; Attendance: 17,205; Referee: Mike Riley (England)

10 December 2003 6	AEK Athens (Greece)	0–0	(France) Monaco	Athens, Greece
21:45 EET (UTC+2)		Report		Stadium: Leoforos Alexandras Stadium; Attendance: 1,205; Referee: Wolfgang Stark (Germany)

== Statistics ==
=== Squad statistics ===
As of 22 May 2004

No.	Pos	Player	Alpha Ethniki		Greek Cup		Champions League		Total	
No.	Pos	Player	Apps	Goals	Apps	Goals	Apps	Goals	Apps	Goals
Goalkeepers
1	GK	(Greece) Chrysostomos Michailidis	19	0	2	0	4	0	25	0
12	GK	(Greece) Sotiris Liberopoulos	4	0	4	0	0	0	8	0
22	GK	(Greece) Dionysis Chiotis	7	0	2	0	4	0	13	0
41	GK	(Greece) Giannis Arabatzis	0	0	0	0	0	0	0	0
Defenders
2	DF	(Greece) Vasilios Borbokis	20	1	4	0	6	0	30	1
5	DF	(Greece) Nikos Kostenoglou	8	0	2	0	6	0	16	0
8	DF	(Netherlands) Michel Kreek	18	0	7	0	3	0	28	0
16	DF	(Greece) Nikolaos Georgeas	12	0	4	0	6	0	22	0
17	DF	(Greece) Michalis Kasapis	9	0	3	0	5	0	17	0
18	DF	(Greece) Vangelis Moras	25	0	5	0	5	0	35	0
19	DF	(Ghana) Kofi Amponsah	15	1	4	0	4	0	23	1
25	DF	(North Macedonia) Goran Popov	8	0	3	0	0	0	11	0
32	DF	(Greece) Michalis Kapsis	19	0	4	0	6	0	29	0
38	DF	(Greece) Panagiotis Stergiatos	0	0	0	0	0	0	0	0
39	DF	(Greece) Grigoris Toskas	1	0	2	0	0	0	3	0
81	DF	(Greece) Stathis Kappos	4	0	1	0	0	0	5	0
Midfielders
3	MF	(Bulgaria) Milen Petkov	15	1	7	1	1	0	23	2
6	MF	(Greece) Theodoros Zagorakis	27	0	5	0	8	0	40	0
10	MF	(Greece) Vasilios Tsiartas	26	2	6	2	8	1	40	5
14	MF	(Bulgaria) Ivan Rusev	10	1	2	2	2	0	14	3
21	MF	(Greece) Kostas Katsouranis	27	7	7	2	8	1	42	10
23	MF	(Greece) Vasilios Lakis	23	10	5	1	4	0	32	11
35	MF	(Greece) Dimitris Karameris	0	0	1	0	0	0	1	0
40	MF	(Greece) Christos Tsevas	1	0	1	0	0	0	2	0
—	MF	(United States) Peter Philipakos	0	0	0	0	0	0	0	0
Forwards
9	FW	(Cyprus) Ioannis Okkas	24	5	7	4	8	0	39	9
20	FW	(Greece) Sotiris Konstantinidis	18	2	4	1	3	0	25	3
26	FW	(Greece) Christos Kostis	0	0	1	1	0	0	1	1
30	FW	(Serbia and Montenegro) Ilija Ivić	13	5	2	0	4	0	19	5
33	FW	(Greece) Nikos Liberopoulos	27	13	7	3	6	1	40	17
88	FW	(Greece) Dimitris Nalitzis	23	2	5	0	4	0	32	2
Left during Winter Transfer Window
31	DF	(Greece) Grigoris Georgatos	6	5	0	0	3	0	9	5
—	DF	(Greece) Stelios Maistrellis	0	0	0	0	0	0	0	0
7	MF	(Greece) Christos Maladenis	8	1	2	0	4	0	14	1
34	MF	(Greece) Nikos Pourtoulidis	0	0	2	0	0	0	2	0
36	FW	(Greece) Anastasios Thanos	0	0	0	0	0	0	0	0

=== Goalscorers ===
As of 22 May 2004
The list is sorted by competition order when total goals are equal, then by position and then by squad number.

Rank	No.	Pos.	Player	Alpha Ethniki	Greek Cup	Champions League	Total
1	33	FW	(Greece) Nikos Liberopoulos	13	3	1	17
2	23	MF	(Greece) Vasilios Lakis	10	1	0	11
3	21	MF	(Greece) Kostas Katsouranis	7	2	1	10
4	9	FW	(Cyprus) Ioannis Okkas	5	4	0	9
5	31	DF	(Greece) Grigoris Georgatos	5	0	0	5
5	17	MF	(Serbia and Montenegro) Vladan Ivić	5	0	0	5
5	10	MF	(Greece) Vasilios Tsiartas	2	2	1	5
8	20	FW	(Greece) Sotiris Konstantinidis	2	1	0	3
8	14	MF	(Bulgaria) Ivan Rusev	1	2	0	3
10	88	FW	(Greece) Dimitris Nalitzis	2	0	0	2
10	3	MF	(Bulgaria) Milen Petkov	1	1	0	2
12	19	DF	(Ghana) Kofi Amponsah	1	0	0	1
12	2	DF	(Greece) Vasilios Borbokis	1	0	0	1
12	7	MF	(Greece) Christos Maladenis	1	0	0	1
12	26	FW	(Greece) Christos Kostis	0	1	0	1
Own goals				1	0	1	2
Totals				57	17	4	78

=== Hat-tricks ===
Numbers in superscript represent the goals that the player scored.

Player	Against	Result	Date	Competition	Source
(Greece) Nikos Liberopoulos	(Greece) Akratitos	7–2 (A)	9 November 2003	Alpha Ethniki	
(Cyprus) Ioannis Okkas	(Greece) Doxa Drama	4–0 (A)	17 August 2003	Greek Cup	

=== Assists ===
As of 22 May 2004
The list is sorted by competition order when total assists are equal, then by position and then by squad number.

Rank	No.	Pos.	Player	Alpha Ethniki	Greek Cup	Champions League	Total
1	10	MF	(Greece) Vasilios Tsiartas	13	2	1	16
2	20	FW	(Greece) Sotiris Konstantinidis	4	2	0	6
2	9	FW	(Cyprus) Ioannis Okkas	4	2	0	6
4	23	MF	(Greece) Vasilios Lakis	3	2	0	5
5	6	MF	(Greece) Theodoros Zagorakis	4	0	0	4
5	33	FW	(Greece) Nikos Liberopoulos	3	1	0	4
5	2	DF	(Greece) Vasilios Borbokis	3	0	1	4
8	14	MF	(Bulgaria) Ivan Rusev	2	1	0	3
8	88	FW	(Greece) Dimitris Nalitzis	2	0	1	3
10	21	MF	(Greece) Kostas Katsouranis	2	0	0	2
10	17	MF	(Serbia and Montenegro) Vladan Ivić	2	0	0	2
12	5	DF	(Greece) Nikos Kostenoglou	1	0	0	1
12	8	DF	(Netherlands) Michel Kreek	1	0	0	1
12	3	MF	(Bulgaria) Milen Petkov	1	0	0	1
12	7	MF	(Greece) Christos Maladenis	0	1	0	1
Totals				45	11	3	59

=== Clean sheets ===
As of 22 May 2004
The list is sorted by competition order when total clean sheets are equal and then by squad number. Clean sheets in games where both goalkeepers participated are awarded to the goalkeeper who started the game. Goalkeepers with no appearances are not included.

Rank	No.	Player	Alpha Ethniki	Greek Cup	Champions League	Total
1	1	(Greece) Chrysostomos Michailidis	6	2	1	9
2	12	(Greece) Sotiris Liberopoulos	2	1	0	3
2	22	(Greece) Dionysis Chiotis	2	1	0	3
Totals			10	4	1	15

=== Disciplinary record ===
As of 22 May 2004

N	P	Nat.	Name	Alpha Ethniki			Greek Cup			Champions League			Total			Notes
N	P	Nat.	Name	Yellow card	Second yellow card	Red card	Yellow card	Second yellow card	Red card	Yellow card	Second yellow card	Red card	Yellow card	Second yellow card	Red card	Notes
Goalkeepers
1	GK	(Greece)	Chrysostomos Michailidis	2									2			
12	GK	(Greece)	Sotiris Liberopoulos													
22	GK	(Greece)	Dionysis Chiotis	1									1			
41	GK	(Greece)	Giannis Arabatzis													
Defenders
2	DF	(Greece)	Vasilios Borbokis	4			1			1			6			
5	DF	(Greece)	Nikos Kostenoglou	2						1			3			
8	DF	(Netherlands)	Michel Kreek	2			2	1					4	1		
16	DF	(Greece)	Nikolaos Georgeas	4						1			5			
17	DF	(Greece)	Michalis Kasapis	2						1			3			
18	DF	(Greece)	Vangelis Moras	2			1						3			
19	DF	(Ghana)	Kofi Amponsah	4	1		1			2		1	7	1	1	
25	DF	(North Macedonia)	Goran Popov	3	1								3	1		
32	DF	(Greece)	Michalis Kapsis	1		1				1			2		1	
38	DF	(Greece)	Panagiotis Stergiatos													
39	DF	(Greece)	Grigoris Toskas													
81	DF	(Greece)	Stathis Kappos													
Midfielders
3	MF	(Bulgaria)	Milen Petkov				3	1					3	1		
6	MF	(Greece)	Theodoros Zagorakis	4						1			5			
10	MF	(Greece)	Vasilios Tsiartas							2			2			
14	MF	(Bulgaria)	Ivan Rusev	1									1			
21	MF	(Greece)	Kostas Katsouranis	6			1			1			8			
23	MF	(Greece)	Vasilios Lakis	1									1			
35	MF	(Greece)	Dimitris Karameris													
40	MF	(Greece)	Christos Tsevas													
—	MF	(United States)	Peter Philipakos													
Forwards
9	FW	(Cyprus)	Ioannis Okkas	8						2			10			
20	FW	(Greece)	Sotiris Konstantinidis	3									3			
26	FW	(Greece)	Christos Kostis													
30	FW	(Serbia and Montenegro)	Ilija Ivić	3									3			
33	FW	(Greece)	Nikos Liberopoulos	3			2			1			6			
88	FW	(Greece)	Dimitris Nalitzis	2									2			
Left during Winter Transfer window
31	DF	(Greece)	Grigoris Georgatos	1						1			2			
—	DF	(Greece)	Stelios Maistrellis													
7	MF	(Greece)	Christos Maladenis	3									3			
34	MF	(Greece)	Nikos Pourtoulidis													
36	FW	(Greece)	Anastasios Thanos													

=== Starting 11 ===
This section presents the most frequently used formation along with the players with the most starts across all competitions.

N.	Formation	Matchday(s)
39	4–4–2	1–2, 4–17, 19–30
3	4–2–3–1	3, 18
2	5–4–1

No.	Nat.	Player	Pos.
1	(Greece)	Chrysostomos Michailidis	GK
18	(Greece)	Vangelis Moras	RCB
32	(Greece)	Michalis Kapsis	LCB
2	(Greece)	Vasilios Borbokis	RB
8	(Netherlands)	Michel Kreek	LB
6	(Greece)	Theodoros Zagorakis (C)	DM
21	(Greece)	Kostas Katsouranis	CM
23	(Greece)	Vasilios Lakis	RM
10	(Greece)	Vasilios Tsiartas	LM
33	(Greece)	Nikos Liberopoulos	SS
9	(Cyprus)	Ioannis Okkas	CF

Last updated: 2004-05-22
