= List of football stadiums in Greece =

The following is a list of football stadiums in Greece, ranked in order of capacity, with the minimum capacity being 2,000.

== Current stadiums ==
| # | Image | Stadium | Capacity | City | Home team | Opened | UEFA rank |
|---|---|---|---|---|---|---|---|
| 1 | | Athens Olympic Sports Center "Spyros Louis" Central Olympic Stadium | 69,618 | Athens | Panathinaikos, Greece national team | 1982 | 4/4 stars |
| 2 | | Georgios Karaiskakis Stadium | 33,449 | Piraeus | Olympiacos, Greece national team | 2004 | 4/4 stars |
| 3 | | Agia Sophia Stadium | 31,100 | Athens | AEK Athens | 2022 | 4/4 stars |
| 4 | | Toumba Stadium | 28,703 | Thessaloniki | PAOK | 1959 | 4/4 stars |
| 5 | | Kaftanzoglio Stadium | 27,770 | Thessaloniki | Iraklis | 1960 | |
| 6 | | Pankritio Stadium | 26,240 | Heraklion | OFI | 2004 | |
| 7 | | Pampeloponnisiako Stadium | 23,588 | Patras | | 1981 | |
| 8 | | Kleanthis Vikelidis Stadium | 22,800 | Thessaloniki | Aris | 1951 | |
| 9 | | Panthessaliko Stadium | 22,700 | Volos | Volos | 2004 | |
| 10 | | AEL FC Arena | 17,118 | Larissa | AEL | 2010 | 3/4 stars |
| 11 | | Leoforos Alexandras Stadium | 16,003 | Athens | A.E. Kifisia | 1922 | |
| 12 | | Trikala Municipal Stadium | 15,000 | Trikala | Trikala | 1950 | |
| 13 | | Georgios Kamaras Stadium | 14,200 | Athens | Apollon Smyrnis | 1948 | |
| 14 | | Alcazar Stadium | 13,108 | Larissa | | 1965 | |
| 15 | | Nea Smyrni Stadium | 11,342 | Athens | Panionios | 1939 | |
| 16 | | Kostas Davourlis Stadium | 11,321 | Patras | Panachaiki | 1939 | |
| 17 | | Anthi Karagianni Stadium | 10,550 | Kavala | Kavala | 1970 | |
| 18 | | Serres Municipal Stadium | 9,500 | Serres | Panserraikos | 1926 | |
| 19 | | Xanthi Ground | 9,500 | Xanthi | Xanthi | 1970 | |
| 20 | | Municipal Stadium of Karditsa | 9,500 | Karditsa | Anagennisi Karditsa | 1930 | |
| 21 | | Theodoros Vardinogiannis Stadium | 9,088 | Heraklion | | 1951 | |
| 22 | | Peristeri Stadium | 9,050 | Athens | Atromitos | 1947 | |
| 23 | | Volos Municipal Stadium | 9,000 | Volos | Olympiacos Volos | 1968 | |
| 24 | | Stavros Mavrothalassitis Stadium | 8,217 | Athens | Egaleo | 1968 | |
| 25 | | Makedonikos Stadium | 8,100 | Thessaloniki | Makedonikos, PAOK B | 1967 | |
| 26 | | Municipal Stadium of Kastoria | 8,000 | Kastoria | Kastoria | 1990 | |
| 27 | | Zosimades Stadium | 7,652 | Ioannina | PAS Giannina | 1952 | |
| 28 | | Theodoros Kolokotronis Stadium | 7,442 | Tripoli | Asteras Tripolis | 1979 | |
| 29 | | Panetolikos Stadium | 7,321 | Agrinio | Panetolikos | 1930 | |
| 30 | | Xanthi FC Arena | 7,244 | Xanthi | Xanthi | 2004 | |
| 31 | | Doxa Drama Stadium | 7,000 | Drama | Doxa Drama | 1953 | |
| 32 | | Veria Stadium | 7,000 | Veria | Veria | 1925 | |
| 33 | | Pyrgos Stadium | 6,750 | Pyrgos | PAS Pyrgos | 1978 | |
| 34 | | Kalamaria Stadium | 6,500 | Thessaloniki | Apollon Kalamarias | 1973 | |
| 35 | | Komotini Municipal Stadium | 6,198 | Komotini | Panthrakikos | 1923 | |
| 36 | | Levadia Municipal Stadium | 5,915 | Livadeia | Levadiakos | 1952 | |
| 37 | | Messiniakos Stadium | 5,613 | Kalamata | Messiniakos | 1967 | |
| 38 | | Lamia Municipal Stadium | 5,500 | Lamia | Lamia | 1952 | |
| 39 | | Neapoli Stadium | 5,500 | Athens | Ionikos | 1965 | |
| 40 | | Argos Municipal Stadium | 5,000 | Argos | Panargiakos | | |
| 41 | | Pantelis Magoulas Stadium | 5,000 | Volos | Niki Volos | 1924 | |
| 42 | | Katerini Stadium | 4,995 | Katerini | Pierikos | 1964 | |
| 43 | | Yiannis Pathiakakis Stadium | 4,944 | Athens | Akratitos | 1965 | |
| 44 | | Perivolia Municipal Stadium | 4,527 | Chania | Chania | 1959 | |
| 45 | | Aigio National Stadium | 4,500 | Aigio | Panegialios | 1951 | |
| 46 | | Acharnes Stadium | 4,450 | Athens | Acharnaikos | 1953 | |
| 47 | | Nikaia Municipal Gymnasium | 4,361 | Athens | Proodeftiki | 1937 | |
| 48 | | Vyronas National Stadium | 4,340 | Athens | Athinaikos | 1990 | |
| 49 | | Grigoris Lambrakis Stadium | 4,200 | Athens | Athens Kallithea | 1970 | |
| 50 | | Fyli Municipal Stadium | 4,000 | Athens | Thrasyvoulos | 1989 | |
| 51 | | Kozani Stadium | 4,000 | Kozani | Kozani | 1955 | |
| 52 | | Tavros Stadium | 4,000 | Athens | Fostiras | 1969 | |
| 53 | | Diagoras Stadium | 3,693 | Rhodes | Diagoras, Rodos | 1932 | |
| 54 | | Agios Dimitrios Municipal Stadium | 3,100 | Athens | Agios Dimitrios | | |
| 55 | | Municipal Stadium of Markopoulo | 3,000 | Markopoulo Mesogeas | Marko | 1970 | |
| 56 | | Mytilene Municipal Stadium | 3,000 | Mytilene | Aiolikos | 1960 | |
| 57 | | Fafaleio Stadium | 3,000 | Chios | Lailapas | | |
| 58 | | Kerkyra Stadium | 3,000 | Corfu | Kerkyra | 1961 | |
| 59 | | Serafidio Stadium | 3,000 | Athens | | 2022 | |
| 60 | | Municipal Stadium of Zografou | 2,716 | Athens | Ilisiakos | 1972 | |
| 61 | | Prosfygika Stadium | 2,500 | Patras | Olympiacos Patras | 1925 | |
| 62 | | Paneipirotiko Stadium | 2,051 | Ioannina | AE Giannena | 2002 | |

=== Proposed stadiums ===
| Image | Stadium | Capacity | City | Club | Opening | UEFA rank |
|---|---|---|---|---|---|---|
| | New Karaiskakis Stadium | 52,000 | Piraeus | Olympiacos | 2028 | 4/4 stars |
| | New Toumba Stadium | 34,000-35,000 | Thessaloniki | PAOK | 2029 | 4/4 stars |
| | Votanikos Stadium | 40,000 | Athens | Panathinaikos | 2027 | 4/4 stars |
| | New Serres Municipal Stadium | 12,000 | Serres | Panserraikos | 2029 | 3/3 stars |
| | El Paso | 9,000 | Athens | Athens Kallithea | 2029 | 3/3 stars |

== See also ==
- List of European stadiums by capacity
- List of association football stadiums by capacity
- List of association football stadiums by country
- List of sports venues by capacity
- Lists of stadiums
