= Olympic Stadium (Athens) =

Part of the Athens Olympic Sports Complex

Olympic Stadium of Athens
- Ολυμπιακό Στάδιο της Αθήνας
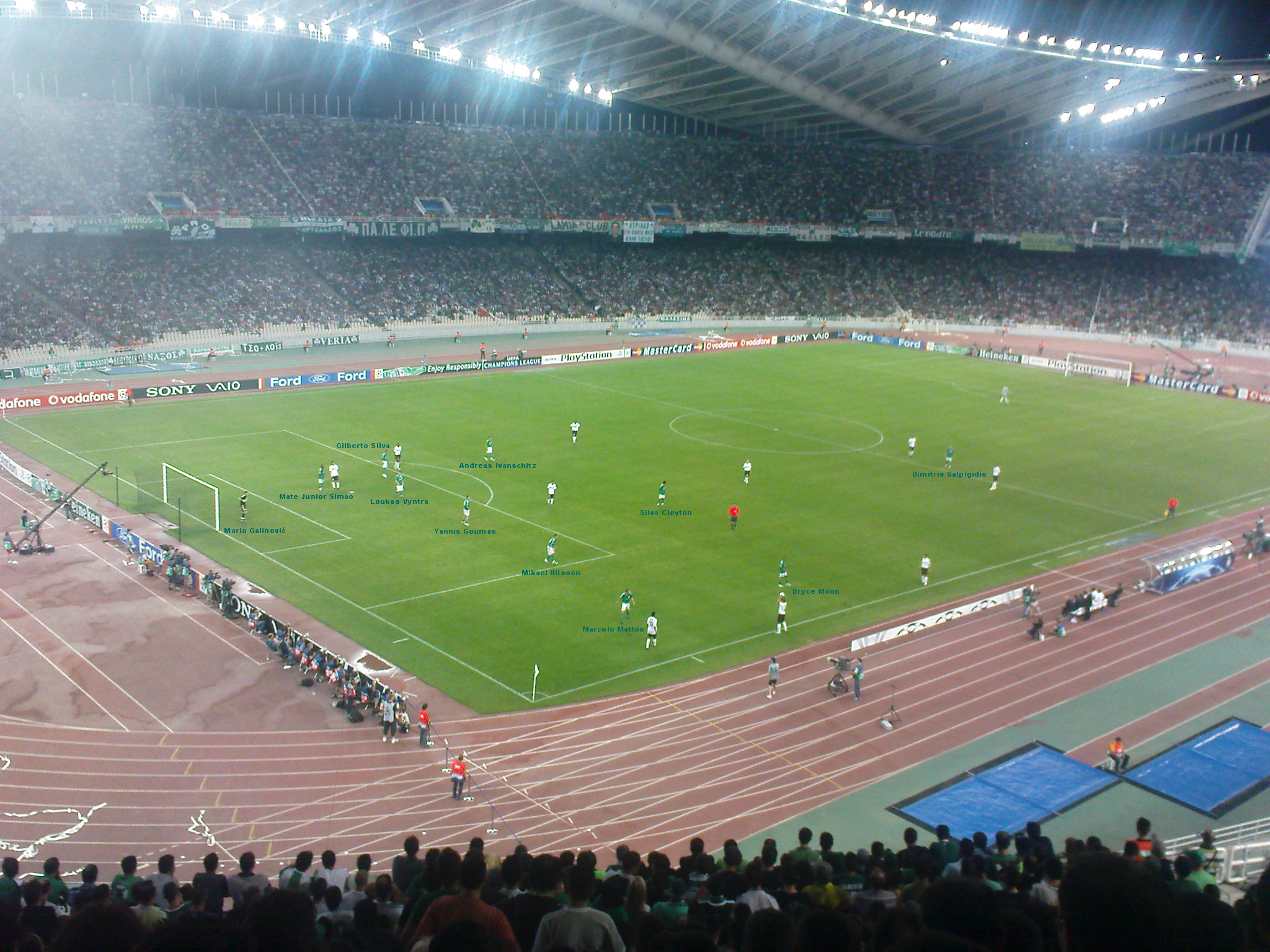
- UEFA
- Interactive map of Olympic Stadium of Athens
- Full name: Central Olympic Stadium of O.A.C.A. "Spyros Louis"
- Former names: Spyros Louis Stadium
- Location: Marousi, Athens, Greece
- Coordinates: 38°2′9.845″N 23°47′15.36″E
- Owner: Government of Greece
- Operator: OAKA S.A.
- Capacity: 69,618 (regulated capacity); 75,000 (total capacity)
- Executive suites: 17
- Surface: Grass, track
- Record attendance: 74,465 (AEK Athens vs Olympiacos 9 February 1986)
- Field size: 105 x 68 m
- Public transit: Eirini

Construction
- Groundbreaking: 1979
- Opened: 8 September 1982
- Renovated: 2002–2004; 2024–2026
- Cost: €265 million (2004) (€405 million in 2023 euros)
- Architects: Weidleplan (H. Stalhout, Frank Herre and Dimitris Andrikopoulos); Santiago Calatrava (renovation)

Tenants
- Panathinaikos (1984–2000, 2005–2007, 2008–2013, 2018–2020, 2023, 2024–present); AEK Athens (1985–1987, 2004–2022); Olympiacos (1984–1989, 1997–2002); Greece national football team (1983–2001, 2007, 2009–2010, 2018–2021, 2024)

Website
- oaka.com.gr

The Olympic Stadium of Athens "Spyros Louis" (Greek: Ολυμπιακό Στάδιο Αθηνών "Σπύρος Λούης", Olympiakó Stádio Athinón "Spýros Loúis") is a sports stadium in Marousi, in the north section of Athens, Greece. With a total capacity of 75,000, it is the largest sports venue in Greece. It is a part of the Athens Olympic Sports Complex (OAKA) and is named after the first modern Olympic marathon gold medalist in 1896, Spyros Louis. The stadium served as the main stadium during the 2004 Summer Olympics and the 2004 Summer Paralympics, including the opening and closing ceremonies. It is the current home ground of Panathinaikos for UEFA competition matches.

Built in 1982 for the 1982 European Athletics Championships and the Hellenic Football Federation's host bid for the 1990 FIFA World Cup, it became the national stadium of Greece. In its original iteration, it served as the home ground for football clubs Panathinaikos from 1984 to 2000, Olympiacos from 1984 to 1989 and again from 1997 to 2002, and AEK Athens from 1985 to 1987. Additionally, it became the main venue for athletics, as Greek track rose on the international stage, while it also hosted the Greek national football team. It served as the venue for the 1991 Mediterranean Games and the 1997 World Athletics Championships.

As part of the greater construction of the Olympic Sports Complex, the stadium was substantially renovated from 2002 to 2004, to some controversy, highlighted by its trademark roof, designed by Santiago Calatrava. The hosting of the 2004 Olympics and Paralympics became a huge success and was highly lucrative for Greece. After the Games, it hosted Panathinaikos on several occasions from 2005 to 2023 and AEK Athens from 2004 to 2022, while serving as the country's primary sports venue. By the early 2020s, it had become increasingly dilapidated and it was closed on safety grounds in October 2023. Following modifications on the roof, it reopened in May 2024.

The Olympic Stadium has hosted three European Cup/Champions League finals, in 1983, 1994 and 2007, the 1987 European Cup Winners' Cup Final and the men's final in the Summer Olympics.

== History ==
Exterior view of Olympic Stadium

Located in the suburb of Marousi in Athens, the Olympic Stadium was originally designed in 1980 and built in 1980–1982. At over 75,000 capacity, it became the biggest football and track stadium in Greece, well surpassing Thessaloniki's Kaftanzoglio Stadium, which stood at just below 45,000 capacity at the time, following the nationwide renovations after the Karaiskakis Stadium disaster.

It was completed in time to host the 1982 European Championships in Athletics. It was inaugurated by the President of Greece at the time, Konstantinos Karamanlis, on 8 September 1982. Considered an illustrious architectural achievement, it was dubbed by European media as "The modern Greek Wonder". One year later, in 1983, OAKA Stadium hosted the 1983 European Cup final between Hamburger SV and Juventus. In 1984, Panathinaikos took over the Olympic Stadium as their home ground after the Leoforos Alexandras Stadium, fell into disrepair. At the same year Olympiacos also decided to play their home games in the Olympic Stadium instead of the Karaiskakis Stadium, which they shared with city rivals until 1989. The club had successfully experimented with the stadium's usage in its 1982–83 and 1983–84 European campaigns, which included a 2–0 win against Dutch giants AFC Ajax in September 1983, and a 0–4 loss to eventual winners Hamburger in November 1982, which recorded the ground's highest official figures to date, at 75,223 spectators, although unofficial estimates for many events range higher.

In 1985 AEK Athens also moved to the Olympic Stadium until 1987, due to construction works at AEK Stadium. During the club's brief stay at the stadium's initial configuration, an official attendance record of 74,465 was set in a home league match versus Olympiacos in February 1986, which is an all-time record for a Greek football match.

In the 1980s, the three largest Greek football clubs temporarily played in the same stadium, so that during the 1985–86 season the most tickets were sold in one season in Greece, with 1,784,844 tickets sold in 45 games.

Olympiacos returned to the Karaiskakis Stadium in 1989, but as their contract for the stadium rent expired in 1997, the team returned to the Olympic Stadium, which ushered an era of unprecedented success, as the team would win five consecutive league titles and reach the quarter-finals of the UEFA Champions League in the 1998–99 season, establishing a long period of dominance in Greek football, characterised by famous club players such as Christian Karembeu and Giovanni, before departing in 2002 to make way for the Olympic renovations. As the plans for a total renovation of the aging Karaiskakis Stadium commenced, the team played in the Georgios Kamaras Stadium, commonly known as Rizoupoli, from 2002 to 2004, before settling in the rebuilt Karaiskakis, where the club has been situated since.

In 1987, the stadium hosted the 1986–87 European Cup Winners' Cup final between Ajax and Lokomotiv Leipzig. Olympic Stadium is an UEFA category four stadium and is the largest stadium in Greece. In 1994, the stadium hosted their second European Cup Final, this time contested between Milan and Barcelona. It also hosted several events of the 1991 Mediterranean Games and the 1997 World Championships in Athletics, sought in order to prove that it was capable of hosting major sporting events after the failure of Athens to win the 1996 Summer Olympics, but successfully hosting the 2004 Summer Olympics. As a result, the construction works for the stadium which begun in 2002 resulted in Panathinaikos and Olympiacos, who had returned to the Olympic Stadium in 1997, to return to their original homegrounds by the same year. In addition, every final of the Greek Football Cup between 1983 and 2002 took place in the arena intermittently, while it also hosted the only final of the Greek League Cup in 1990.

=== 2004 Summer Olympics ===
The Olympic flame at the 2004 Summer Olympics opening ceremony

It was extensively renovated in time for the 2004 Summer Olympics and the 2004 Summer Paralympics, including a roof designed by Santiago Calatrava, and innovatively positioned with Enerpac hydraulics. The roof was added atop the sidelines and completed just in time for the opening of the Games. The stadium was then officially re-opened on 30 July 2004. It hosted the athletics events and the football finals at the Olympics and the athletics at the Paralympics. It also hosted the opening ceremony on 13 August 2004, and the closing ceremony on 29 August 2004 along the Paralympics ceremonies on 17 and 28 September.

=== Aftermath ===
After the Olympic Games, AEK Athens and Panathinaikos, whose stadiums had become dilapidated and no longer met safety regulations, moved again to the Olympic Stadium. AEK's move back to the stadium after 17 years came as the Nikos Goumas Stadium, the club's traditional home ground since 1930, was demolished in 2003. After spending the first half of the 2003–04 season at the Nea Smyrni Stadium and then primarily at the Giannis Pathiakakis Stadium, due to fan incidents, the club completed its move at the end of the Olympic Games as a temporary stay, which became permanent as AEK's plans for a new stadium were put on halt in the 2000s, due to the club's financial condition.

In 2007, OAKA Stadium hosted the 2007 UEFA Champions League final between Milan and Liverpool. The stadium's attendance was reduced to 72,000 for the Olympics, the initial capacity was some 75,000, though only 69,618 seats were made publicly available for the track and field events and slightly more for the football final. The turf system consists of natural grass in modular containers which incorporate irrigation and drainage systems. Greece applied together with Turkey to host the 2008 and 2012 European Football Championships, with the finals supposed to have taken place in the Athens Olympic Stadium. However, the applications failed: in 2008 the competition went to Austria and Switzerland and for 2012 UEFA decided in favor of Poland and Ukraine.

On 18 March 2012, wild incidents occurred in the derby between Panathinaikos and Olympiacos, as after the goal from the red and whites at the eleventh minute, hooligans from the home team threw Molotov cocktails at the stands, which were filled with around 50,000 spectators, and the pitch. The game had to be abandoned and was awarded 3–0 to Olympiacos and Panathinaikos were deducted five points. There were 30 fires in the arena and 57 arrests. On 14 April 2013, several AEK Athens ultras stormed the pitch during the game against Panthrakikos, who had taken the lead in the 87th minute. The game was subsequently cancelled and awarded 0–3 for Panthrakikos, as AEK Athens were eventually relegated for the first time in their history after being deducted an additional three points. Nevertheless, they continued using the stadium as their home ground.

In 2013, Panathinaikos, unable to afford the rent for the Olympic Stadium, due to the club's deteriorating financial situation, returned in the renovated Leoforos Alexandras Stadium, however the green used again the Olympic Stadium as their home ground from 2018 to 2020. In 2022, as Agia Sophia Stadium was completed, AEK Athens left the Olympic Stadium, after a stay for nearly two decades characterised by major ups and downs for the club's history. After the Olympics, the Olympic Stadium hosted again the Greek Football Cup finals from 2009 to 2016 and in 2018, 2019, 2021 and 2022 respectively.

In 2023, an inspection of the stadium's roof and a preliminary study of upgrades were organized to prepare stadium for the first renovation since 2004. After the inspection, the stadium and the nearby Athens Olympic Velodrome were subsequently ordered to stop instituting any sort of organized events inside the venues and effectively shut down over safety failures.

Following the removal of unsafe panels on the roof, the stadium reopened in May 2024. The renovations are expected to be completed by 2026.

== Design ==
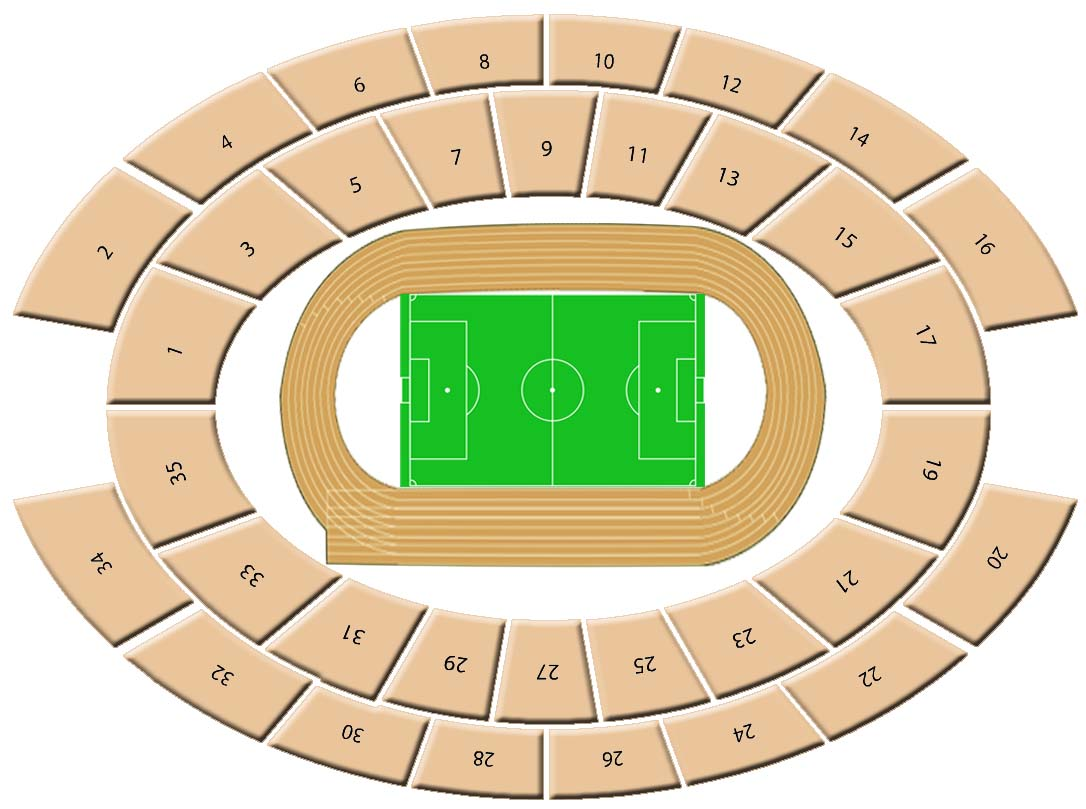

=== Construction ===
The foundation stone for the Olympic Stadium was laid on 7 January 1980. Its construction was revolutionary and involved the use of a prefabrication method for the 34 sets of pillars supporting the stands (each weighed 600 tons). About 26,000 seats of the lower tier were covered, while the stadium's most striking feature were the four leaning pillars that held its floodlights, each being 62 metres tall. The Athens Olympic Stadium was finally inaugurated in September 1982.

=== Renovation ===
The stadium was renovated from 2002 until 2004 adding the famous roof for the 2004 Summer Olympics. The central lawn of O.A.K.A consists of approximately 6.000 plastic capsules inside which thermophile lawn is grown. The capsules are adjoining, their size is 1.2*1.2m and are situated on a flat cement surface of two acres, flanked by two lateral drainage channels. The irrigation of the lawn is achieved by 35 automatically elevated water launchers with the use of programmed irrigation. This system allows the movement of the lawn to an area outside the stadium in order for the surface to be used for different events. Thirty-four entrance gates provide access to the stands. Odd gate numbers (1 to 35) lead to the lower and even numbers (2 to 34) to the upper tier. There are no gates numbered 18 and 36, since the two video-scoreboards are located in their place. Additionally, the stadium features 17 VIP boxes and 3 parking lots. Due to its design, the stadium's tribunes have the ability to empty within 7 minutes.

In July 2026, ERT reported that a renovation program was underway across the OAKA complex, with a total budget of approximately €173 million. Work at the Olympic Stadium included the restoration and structural reinforcement of the stadium's emblematic roof, the replacement of its 5,000 polycarbonate panels, upgraded energy efficient lighting, and the replacement of the pitch and running tracks. The program also included renovations to the stands and technical infrastructure, as well as a digital twin system designed to monitor the movement and structural behavior of the roof. The works at the main stadium are expected to be completed in October 2026.

Competition Area

- 105X68m football field
- 400m track of 9 lanes
- 4 pole vault boxes
- 4 circles for shot put
- 2 lanes for javelin
- 2 circles for discus throw (one of which is equipped with a safety net which can be transformed into a hammer circle)
- 6 lanes for long jump and triple jump
- 2 mattresses for high jump
- 2 electronic scoreboards

=== Roof ===
Designed by the Spanish architect Santiago Calatrava, the roof cost €256.2 million. The two giant arcs have a total span of 304m and a maximum height of 72m. The roof has a total weight of 18,700 tons covering by 5,000 polycarbonate panels which covers an area of 25,000 square metres. The west arc was assembled 72m from its final position and the east 65m - both later slid into place. The roof is designed to withstand winds up to 120 km/h and earthquakes up to magnitude 8.

=== Transport ===
Access by:

Car - Exit the city centre to the north via Kifissias Avenue and just follow the road signs to "OAKA". If you come from the Attiki Odos ring road, use exit 11 ("Kifissias - Ol. Stadium").

Bus - Use E14 from Syntagma Square in central Athens. It will take you directly to the Olympic Stadium in at least 30 minutes.

Metro - It is a 25-minute ride from the city centre. Use Line 1 and get off at "Irini" or "Neratziotissa". From there, it is a 10-minute walk from the Olympic Complex to the stadium.

== Events ==
- Dionysis Savvopoulos performed the first concert ever held at Olympic Stadium on 19 September 1983.
- George Dalaras performed two back to back sold-out concerts on 30 September and 3 October 1983, attended by more than 160,000 people. It is the biggest music event ever held in Greece. "Greek music enters the era of the big stadiums" stated the Rolling Stone magazine. On 28 September 1987, George Dalaras performed a third personal sold-out concert.
- Michael Jackson was booked to perform on a 75,000 sold-out concert as part of his Dangerous World Tour on 10 October 1992, but due to the singer's health problems, the show had to be canceled.
- The Olympic Stadium has been used as home ground in various times by the three big football clubs of Athens, Olympiacos, Panathinaikos and AEK Athens.
- Pink Floyd performed there on 31 May 1989 as part of their A Momentary Lapse of Reason Tour.
- It hosted the 2007 UEFA Champions League final on 23 May between AC Milan and Liverpool, which was won 2–1 by Milan, the 1994 final between Milan and Barcelona, which was also won by Milan, the 1983 final, as well as the 1987 UEFA Cup Winners' Cup final.
- The stadium played host to Amnesty International's Human Rights Now! Benefit Concert on 3 October 1988. The show was headlined by Bruce Springsteen & The E Street Band and also featured Sting and Peter Gabriel, Tracy Chapman, Youssou N'Dour, and George Dalaras.
- The 2004 Summer Olympics took place in Olympic Stadium. The stadium hosted the Ceremonies and the Athletics competitions.
- Shakira became the first female artist to perform at the stadium, attracting over 40,000 attendees on 20 July 2006, during her Oral Fixation Tour.
- Madonna performed before a sold-out crowd of 75,637 at the stadium on 27 September 2008, as part of her Sticky & Sweet Tour.
- U2 performed in front of a crowd of 82,662 during their U2 360° Tour on 3 September 2010.
- Pyx Lax performed also in front of a crowd of about 70,000, during their reunion tour on 13 July 2011.
- Bon Jovi performed during their Bon Jovi Live Tour on 20 July 2011. The show was successful and sold out.
- Red Hot Chili Peppers performed in front of a crowd of about 60,000, as part of their worldwide concert tour on 4 September 2012.
- Lady Gaga performed a show for her world tour, ArtRave: The Artpop Ball, in front of 26,860 people.
- Jehovah's Witnesses International Conventions 2014 and 2019. Attendees from all over the world.
- Iron Maiden performed a show during their Legacy of the Beast World Tour on 16 July 2022, in front of around 40,000 people.
- Coldplay performed during their Music of the Spheres World Tour on 8 and 9 June 2024. Both shows were instantly sold out.
- Metallica performed during their M72 World Tour on 9 May 2026. The show was an instant sold out and held the record for the biggest attendance with over 89,900 people until September 26th, 2026.
- Iron Maiden kicked off the European leg of their Run for Your Lives World Tour on 23 May 2026. Anthrax opened the show. This was their highest attended concert in Greece with over 50,000 people.
- Anna Vissi performed a sold-out concert on 26 September 2026. It currently holds the record for the most attended concert in the stadium's history with 95,000 people, using a 360 stage setup. The concert was opened by DJ Argy and Orianthi was a special guest. Vissi is the only female artist performing in the venue's history.

=== Association football finals ===
Date	Winners	Result	Runners-up	Round	Attendance
25 May 1983	(West Germany) Hamburger SV	1–0	(Italy) Juventus	1983 European Cup final	73,500
13 May 1987	(Netherlands) Ajax	1–0	(East Germany) Lokomotive Leipzig	1987 European Cup Winners' Cup final	35,000
18 May 1994	(Italy) Milan	4–0	(Spain) Barcelona	1994 UEFA Champions League final	70,000
23 May 2007	(Italy) Milan	2–1	(England) Liverpool	2007 UEFA Champions League final	63,000

== Concerts ==
List of concerts at Olympic Stadium "Spiros Louis", showing date, artist, tour and attendance
Date	Artist	Event	Attendance
19 September 1983	Dionysis Savvopoulos	—	80,000
30 September 1983	George Dalaras	—	160,000
3 October 1983	George Dalaras	—	160,000
13 September 1985	George Dalaras, Haris Alexiou, Dimitra Galani, Vasilis Papakonstantinou, Giannis Kalatzis	Tribute to Manos Loizos	70,000
28 September 1987	George Dalaras	—	74,000
3 October 1988	Sting, Peter Gabriel, Bruce Springsteen & the E Street Band, Tracy Chapman, Youssou N'Dour, George Dalaras	Human Rights Now!	70,000
31 May 1989	Pink Floyd	A Momentary Lapse of Reason	60,000
9 June 1992	Frank Sinatra	—	18,000
24 May 1993	Guns N' Roses	Use Your Illusion	55,000
16 September 1994	George Dalaras, Haris Alexiou, Dimitra Galani, Nana Mouskouri, Georges Moustaki, Stavros Xarchakos	Dedicated to Melina Merkouri	74,000
16 September 1998	The Rolling Stones	Bridges to Babylon	79,446
3 July 2001	Eros Ramazzotti	Stilelibero	—
11 July 2001	Sting, Robert Plant, guest star: George Dalaras	Brand New Day	—
20 July 2006	Shakira	Oral Fixation Tour	40,000
26 July 2007	George Michael	25 Live	40,000
27 September 2008	Madonna	Sticky & Sweet	75,637
28 May 2009	AC/DC	Black Ice World Tour	50,000
8 July 2009	Carlos Santana	Live Your Light	25,000
3 September 2010	U2	U2 360° Tour	82,662
13 July 2011	Pyx Lax	Concert in memory of Manos Xydous	70,000
20 July 2011	Bon Jovi	Open Air	60,652
4 September 2012	Red Hot Chili Peppers	I'm With You	~60,000
3 July 2014	Antonis Remos, Despoina Vandi, Melina Aslanidou, Michalis Kouinelis (Stavento)	One Country, One Voice	~50,000
19 September 2014	Lady Gaga	ArtRave: The Artpop Ball	26,860
6 July 2022	Scorpions, Alice Cooper	Rock Believer Tour 2022	~30,000
16 July 2022	Iron Maiden	Legacy of the Beast World Tour	40,000
22 July 2023	Guns N' Roses	Guns N' Roses 2023 Tour	45,000
30 May 2024	Rammstein	Europe Stadium Tour	~30,000
8 June 2024	Coldplay	Music of the Spheres World Tour	139,459
9 June 2024	Coldplay	Music of the Spheres World Tour	139,459
9 May 2026	Metallica	M72 World Tour	89,900
23 May 2026	Iron Maiden	Run for Your Lives World Tour	55,000
26 September 2026	Anna Vissi	Αnna Vissi Live at OAKA	95,000

== Gallery ==
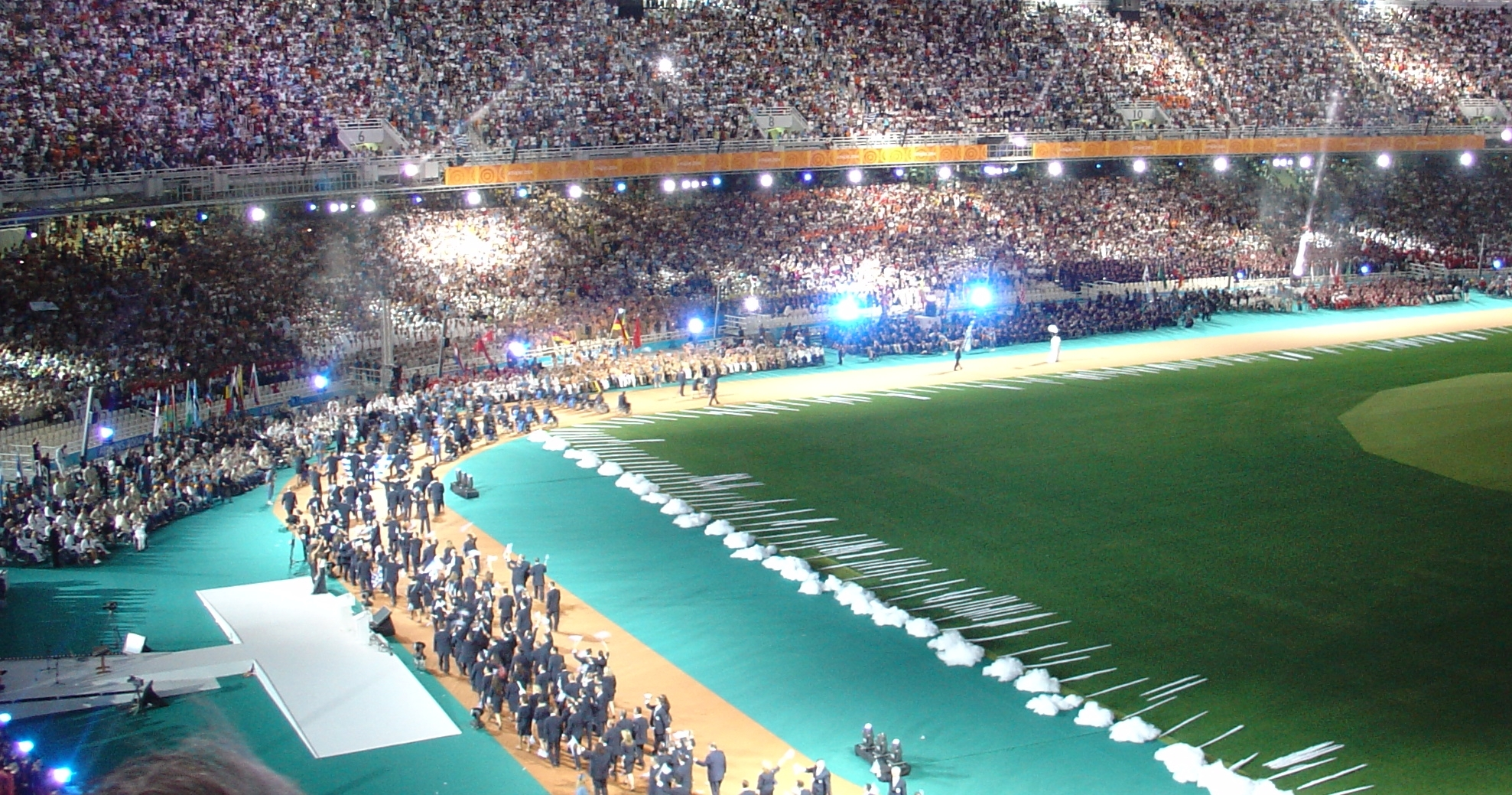
2004 Summer Paralympics opening ceremony

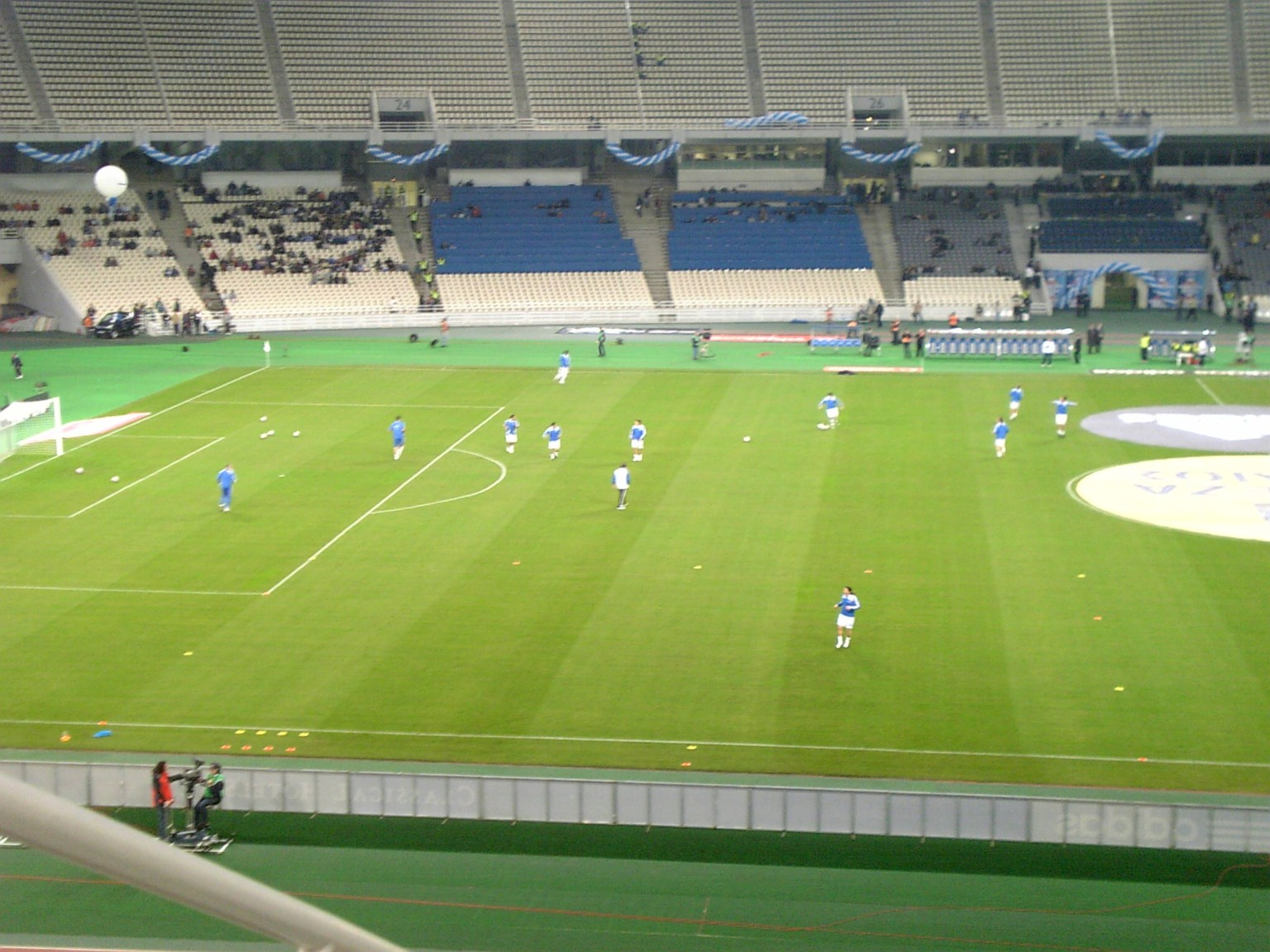
Greece vs Malta (2007)

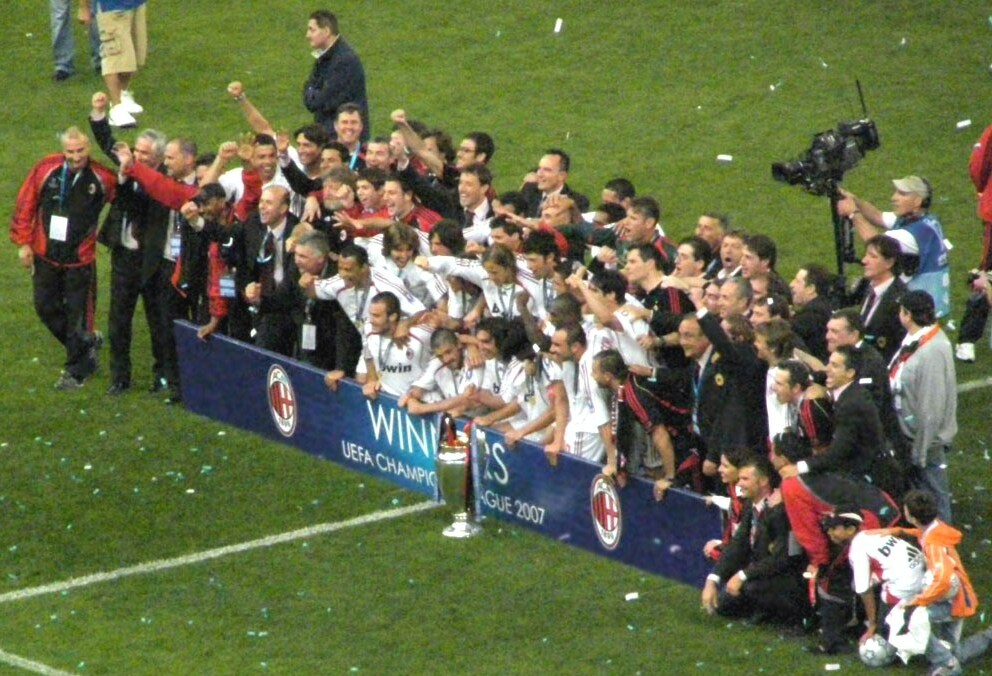
Players of A.C. Milan celebrate after the 2007 UEFA Champions League final

Panathinaikos fans at Olympic Stadium

== See also ==
- Athens Olympic Sports Complex
- List of music venues
- Lists of stadiums

Events and tenants
Preceded by Stadion Evžena Rošického; Prague	European Athletics Championships; Main venue 1982	Succeeded by Neckarstadion; Stuttgart
Preceded by De Kuip; Rotterdam	European Cup; Final venue 1983	Succeeded by Stadio Olimpico; Rome
Preceded by Stade de Gerland; Lyon	European Cup Winners' Cup; Final venue 1987	Succeeded by Stade de la Meinau; Strasbourg
Preceded by Olympiastadion; Munich	UEFA Champions League; Final venue 1994	Succeeded by Ernst-Happel-Stadion; Vienna
Preceded by Ullevi; Gothenburg	IAAF World Championships in Athletics; Main venue 1997	Succeeded by Estadio de La Cartuja; Seville
Preceded by Sydney Olympic Stadium; Sydney	Summer Olympics; Opening and closing ceremonies (Olympic Stadium); 2004	Succeeded by Beijing National Stadium; Beijing
Preceded by Sydney Olympic Stadium; Sydney	Summer Olympics; Olympic athletics competitions Main venue 2004	Succeeded by Beijing National Stadium; Beijing
Preceded by Sydney Olympic Stadium; Sydney	Summer Olympics; Men's football final 2004	Succeeded by Beijing National Stadium; Beijing
Preceded by Stade de France; Saint-Denis	UEFA Champions League; Final venue 2007	Succeeded by Luzhniki Stadium; Moscow
