= 87 Minutes Project =

The 87 Minutes Project
- Formation: October 2013
- Type: Non-profit
- Location(s): Greece and Turkey

The 87 Minutes Project (Greek: 87 Λεπτά; Turkish: 87 Dakika) is a Greco-Turkish initiative seeking to improve relations between the two nations through events, partnerships and dialogue. The project became internationally well known for the successful resurrection of an historic soccer match played between F.C. Lailapas of Greece and Karşıyaka S.K. of Turkey in December 1930, but abandoned after just three minutes due to bad weather.

== Background ==
Following decades of hostility between the two nations, the Ankara Convention of October 1930 ushered in a period of rapprochement, with Prime Minister of Greece Eleftherios Venizelos and President of Turkey Mustafa Kemal Atatürk signing agreements on a number of key questions, above all trade. It was suggested also that sporting and cultural initiatives ought to be pursued as a means of bringing people and organizations together from both sides. Against this backdrop, it was arranged that F.C. Lailapas and Karşıyaka S.K., champions of Chios and İzmir respectively, should meet in December 1930 for what would be the first match between Greek and Turkish football teams since the Treaty of Lausanne and subsequent population exchange. However, although the two teams took to the field of play on 8 December in Chios Town, torrential rain forced the match's abandonment after only three minutes. Further attempts to play the match were never made.

== 87 Minutes, 84 Years Later ==
In October 2013, the 87 Minutes Project was launched. On establishment, its stated aim was the revival of the abandoned match. Furthermore, it was symbolically proposed that the two teams play exactly eighty-seven minutes. Officials from both clubs met and a date of Saturday 10 May 2014 was agreed upon. As in 1930, Chios would be the venue for the match. The announcement generated considerable media interest in Greece and Turkey, with many national newspapers running the story.

The match was attended by a large number of dignitaries, including both ambassadors, the mayors of İzmir and Chios, the heads of both national Football Associations and other officials. In a symbolic gesture, former Turkish international and current Karşıyaka S.K. head coach, Yusuf Şimşek started the game for Lailapas whilst mayor of Karşıyaka, Huseyin Mutlu Akpinar played the opening fifteen minutes for Karşıyaka S.K. Both scored as the game ended 5-5. Before the end of the game however, Turkish fans invaded the pitch and stole the football. The fans requested that the match should remain unfinished in order that "the friendship between the people might continue forever". Both sides consented to end the match at this point, shortly before the eighty-seven minutes were completed.

In a ceremony that took place the following day, F.C. Lailapas and Karşıyaka S.K. officially became the first Greek and Turkish football teams to be twinned.

== Impact ==
The 87 Minutes Project was widely praised by media outlets around the globe, whilst Greek and Turkish newspapers heralded the event as a significant milestone in Greek-Turkish relations. That the match attracted such interest was seen as indicative of an increasing desire on both sides to reconcile long-held differences and establish closer ties. On the weekend of 10 May an unprecedented number of Turkish supporters and tourists visited the island for the match, while a large catamaran was chartered to carry the visitors back and forth from Çeşme. This represented a first for Chios which has since seen a marked rise in tourism from Turkey.

== Future ==
The 87 Minutes Project has declared that it will continue to pursue other initiatives with the aim of strengthening relations between the two nations. Recently, 87 Minutes proposed the twinning of the İzmir and Chios municipalities on the basis of common heritage.
