= AEK Arena =

AEK Arena may refer to:

- AEK Arena – Georgios Karapatakis, a sports venue in Larnaca, Cyprus
- Agia Sophia Stadium, a sports venue in Athens, Greece, also known as AEK Arena
- AEK Arena (cancelled project), a proposed sports venue in Athens, Greece
