= Ivan Rusev =

Ivan Rusev may refer to:

- Ivan Rusev (footballer) (born 1979), Bulgarian footballer
- Ivan Rusev (badminton) (born 1993), Bulgarian badminton player
