= Panepirotan National Athletic Center =

Sports venue in Ioannina, Greece

- Panepirotiko Stadio (Πανηπειρωτικό Στάδιο)
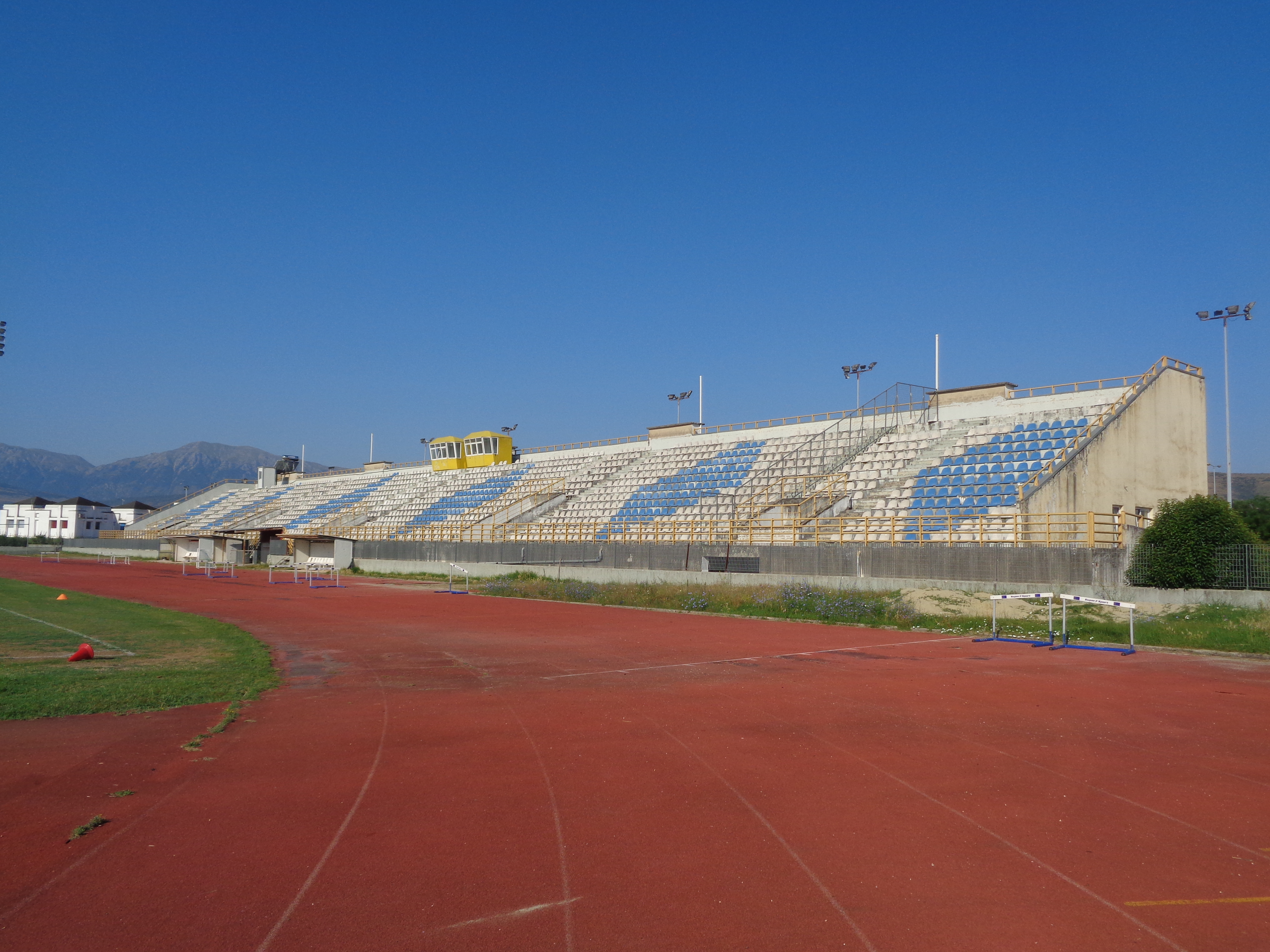
- Interactive map of Panepirotan National Athletic Center
- Location: Anatoli 452 21, Ioannina, Greece
- Coordinates: 39°37′20″N 20°51′49″E
- Owner: General Secretariat of Sports
- Operator: PAS Giannina; AE Giannena; AO Velissarios FC
- Capacity: 2,050 seats and Parkign 500 seats
- Surface: Grass
- Scoreboard: Yes

Construction
- Built: 2002

Tenants
- PAS Giannina: 2004–

Website
- PEAKI.gr

The Panepirotan National Athletic Center (Greek: ΠΕΑΚ Ιωαννίνων), more commonly known as Panepirotiko Stadio (Greek: "Πανηπειρωτικό Στάδιο") is a sports complex in Ioannina, Epirus, Greece.

== History ==
The facilities were opened in 2002. In 2004, PAS Giannina started using the facility fortraining sessions. On 20 July 2024 Konstantinos Argyros held a concert in the facility.

== Facilities ==
- 1 natural grass football pitch, with tartan and stands for 2,050 seats and a parking lot for 500
- 2 auxiliary natural grass football pitches
- 2 5x5 synthetic grass football pitches
- 5 outdoor basketball courts
- 2 outdoor tennis courts and 2 indoor
- 2 outdoor volleyball courts
- 1 outdoor handball court
- The only ice rink in Ioannina
- Refreshment - Pantry
- Weather station

== Use ==
The facilities are used by PAS Giannina as a training field. The Panepirotiko Stadium is the home stadium of the AE Giannena and AO Velissarios FC, which plays in local divisions. Many of the various sports clubs of the city use its facilities for training or matches.

== Other uses ==
=== Concerts ===
Date	Concert	Tour	Attendance	Notes:
20 July 2024	Konstantinos Argyros	Diamond Tour By Coca-Cola		

== Gallery ==
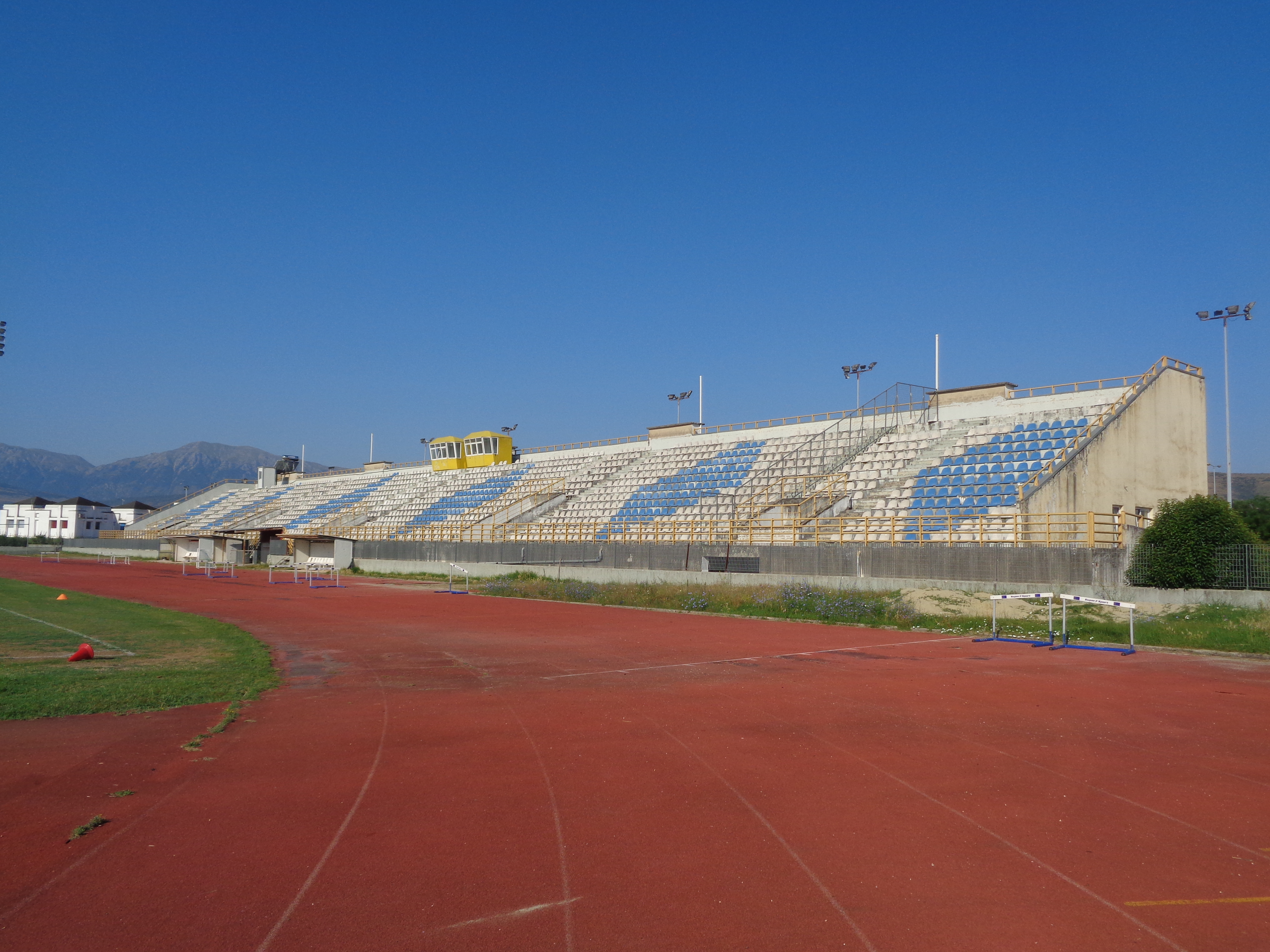
football pitch

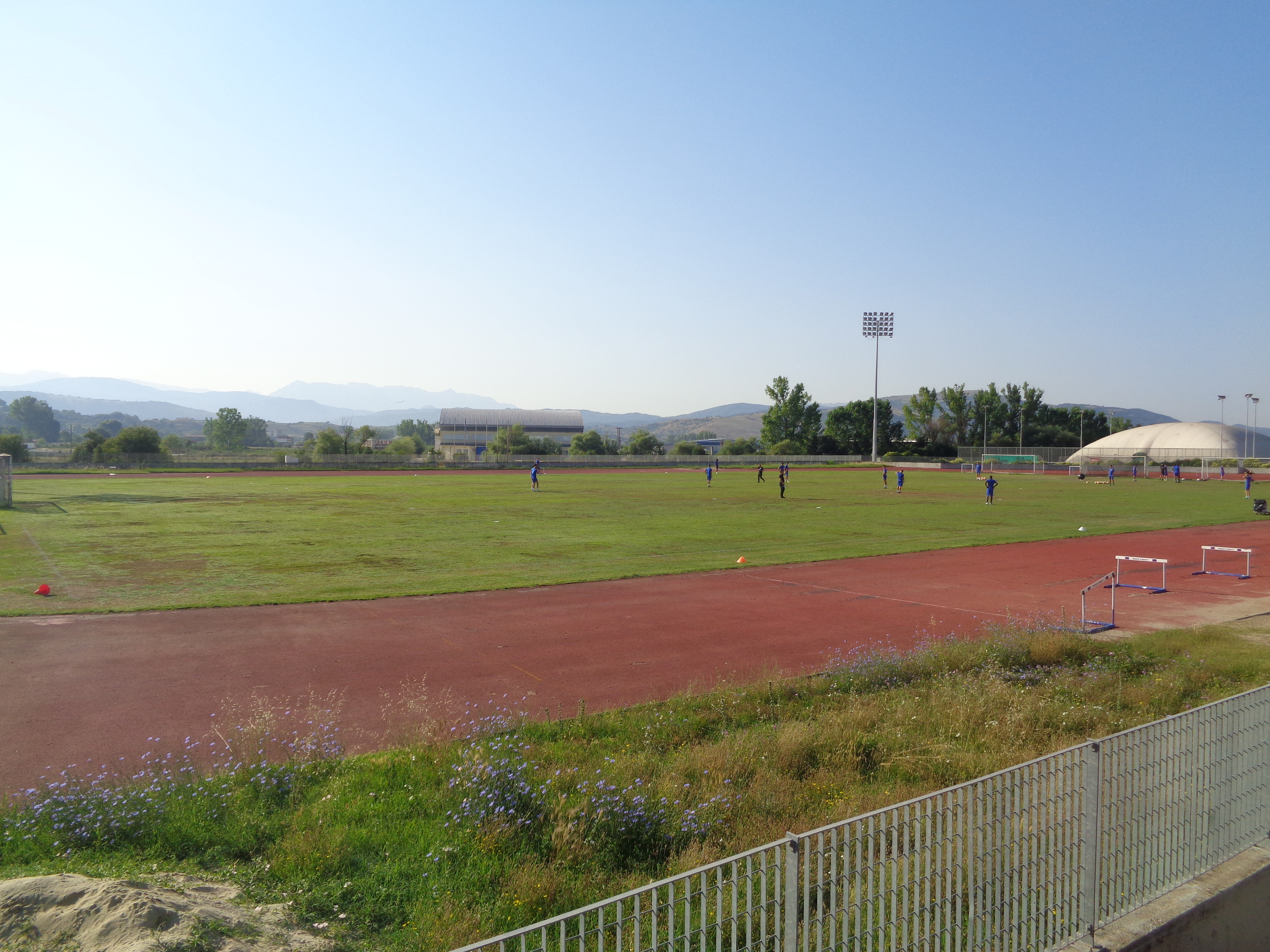
football pitch

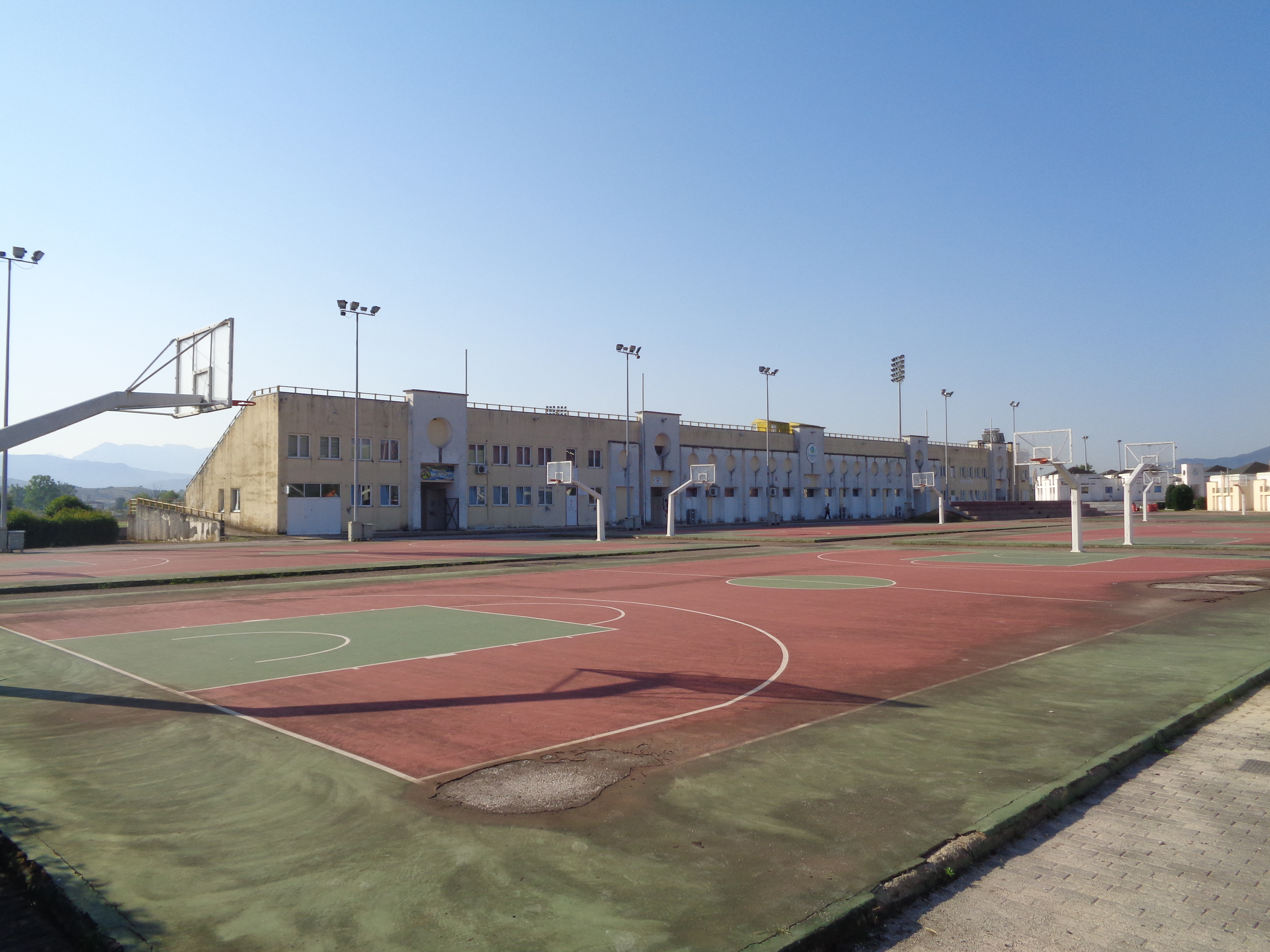
basketball court

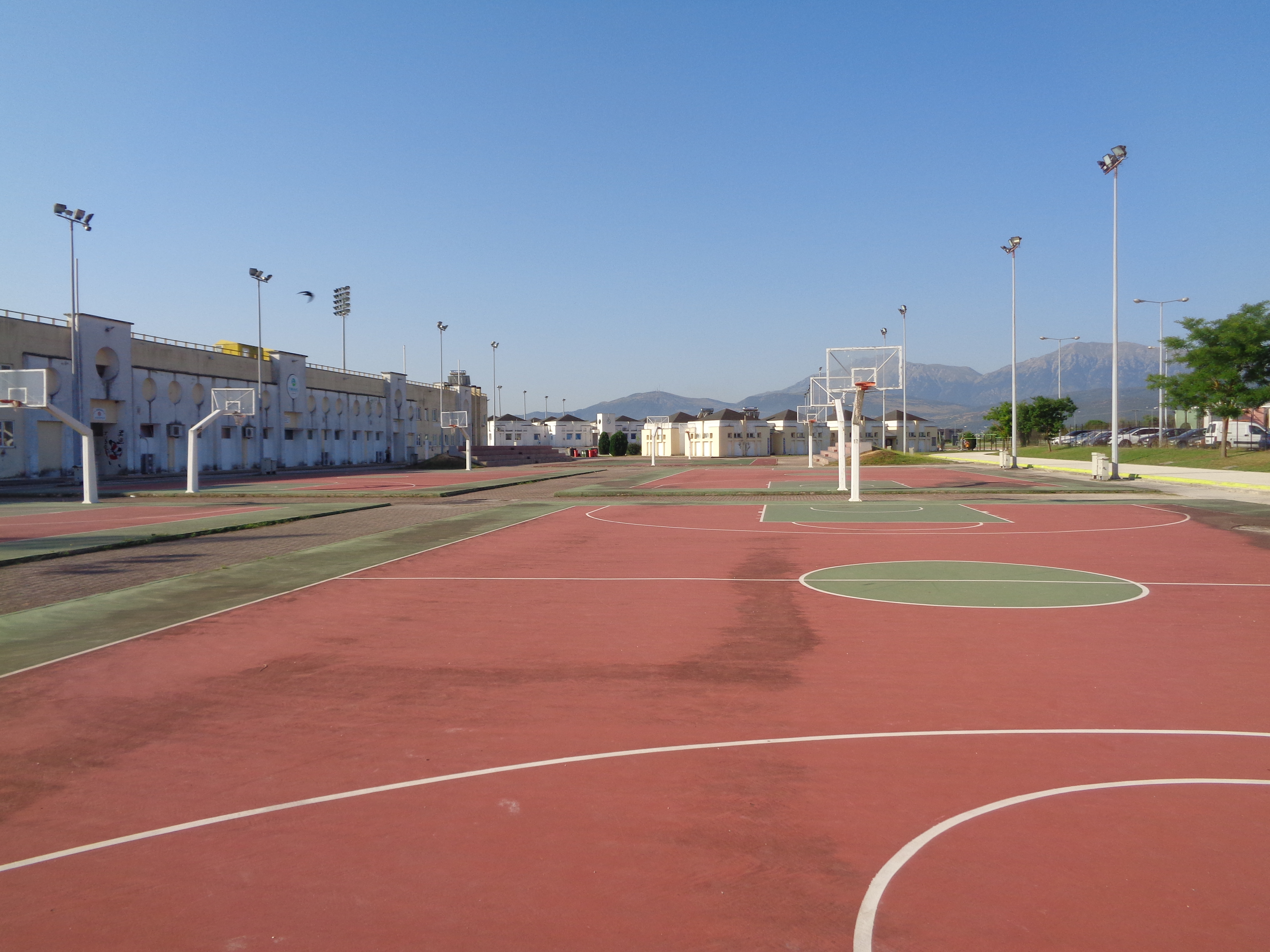
basketball court

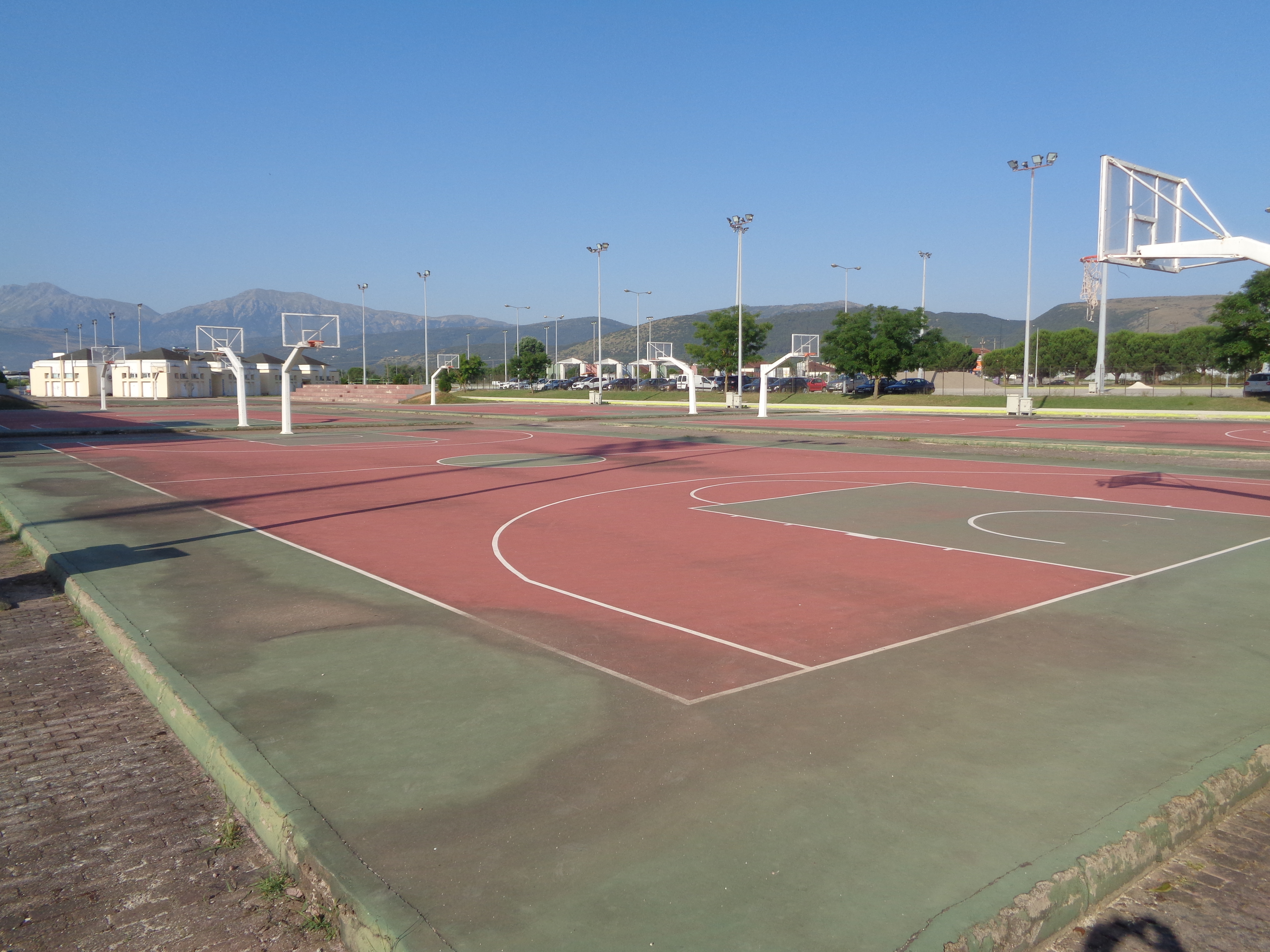
basketball court

== Links ==
- Profile at PEAKI.gr (in Greek)
- Panipeirotiko Stadium Profile at Stadia.gr (in English)
