= Dimitris Ioannou =

Greek footballer (born in 1977)

Personal information
- Full name: Dimitrios Ioannou
- Date of birth: 15 March 1977 (age 49)
- Place of birth: Athens, Greece
- Height: 1.88 m (6 ft 2 in)
- Position: Defender

Senior career*
Years	Team	Apps	(Gls)
1995–1997	Fokikos	28	(0)
1997–2003	Panachaiki	117	(7)
2003–2005	Iraklis	51	(1)
2005–2006	Apollon Kalamarias	22	(0)
2006–2009	Atromitos	67	(2)
2009–2011	Kerkyra	39	(0)
2011–2012	Levadiakos	5	(0)
2012–2013	AEP Paphos	25	(0)
- * Club domestic league appearances and goals as of 19 March 2018

Dimitris Ioannou (Greek: Δημήτρης Ιωάννου, born 15 March 1977) is a retired Greek football player.
