= Peter Philipakos =

American soccer player

- Philipakos playing for Olympiacos

Personal information
- Date of birth: 21 January 1983 (age 43)
- Place of birth: Glen Cove, New York, United States
- Height: 1.76 m (5 ft 9 in)
- Position: Midfielder

Youth career
- Hewlett-Lawrence Soccer Club
- 2001: St. John's University
- 2002–2003: American Eagles

Senior career*
Years	Team	Apps	(Gls)
2004	AEK Athens	0	(0)
2004–2006	Olympiacos	3	(0)
2006	Aris	6	(0)
2006–2007	Ethnikos Piraeus	3	(0)
2007–2008	FK SIAD Most	1	(0)
2008–2009	Ethnikos Piraeus	11	(0)
2010–2011	Chersonissos	26	(1)
2011–2012	Iraklis Psachna	5	(0)
2012	Vyzas Megara	2	(0)
Total		57	(1)
- * Club domestic league appearances and goals

Peter Philipakos (Greek: Πέτρος Φιλιππάκος; born 21 January 1983) is an American retired soccer player who played as a midfielder.

== Club career ==
=== Amateur ===
Philipakos was born in the United States and played youth club soccer for nationally ranked Hewlett NOGA / Hewlett Blue Streak of Hewlett-Lawrence Soccer Club in Five Towns, New York. Philipakos was a U.S. Youth Soccer Region I and Eastern New York Youth Soccer Association (ENYYSA) Olympic Development Program (ODP) player.

After graduating from Glen Cove High School in Glen Cove, New York, Peter matriculated to St. John's University in 2001. In his freshman year at St. John's, he played as a left-side attacking midfielder. In 23 appearances (18 starts) he scored 3 goals, helping St. John's win the 2001 Big East Conference Championship. They reached the 2001 NCAA Men's Soccer Championship College Cup (Semifinals). After the 2001 season, Philipakos transferred from St. John's to American University. He spent the 2002 and 2003 seasons playing as an outside-midfielder and second-striker, making 37 total appearances (35 starts), scoring 12 goals and adding 7 assists.

=== Professional ===
==== AEK Athens ====
In late December 2003, after completing his junior year, Philipakos tried out with the Greek side AEK Athens. On 9 January 2004 Philipakos then signed a 3.5-year professional contract with the club. He was ineligible to appear in competitive matches in the season, since AEK already had the maximum-allowed number of non-European Union players on their roster. The Greek citizenship papers of Philipakos could not be processed in time for the club to register him as a Greek player. Nevertheless, the player could train with the team until the start of the following season. Philipakos eventually never played for AEK, who by the end of the season they approached bankruptcy. Philipakos was among a host of players who left the club as a result.

==== Olympiacos ====
In July 2004 the manager of AEK Dušan Bajević controversially signed with their rivals, Olympiacos. He recruited Philipakos to sign a one-year contract with Olympiacos, Greece's most successful club, on 31 July 2004.

Philipakos took part in the pre-season tours of Olympiacos in Spain and Cyprus, but just before the 2004–05 season he suffered an inguinal hernia on his left side that required surgery and forced him to miss season's first half. Philipakos debuted for Olympiacos on January 19, 2005, in the Greek Cup against Iraklis at Kaftanzoglio Stadium. Philipakos made his league debut—and first start—on February 27, 2005, against Chalkidona (now called Atromitos) at Olympiacos’ Georgios Karaiskakis Stadium and he made his European debut on March 16, 2005, in the UEFA Cup Round of 16 against Newcastle United at St James' Park. During the season the Greek media continually compared Philipakos to former Olympiacos star winger Stelios Giannakopoulos. Olympiacos became A' Ethniki champions and Greek Cup winners in the 2004–05 season, with Philipakos making a total of 6 appearances (2 starts), playing primarily as a right-sided midfielder. At the end of the season, Olympiacos renewed Philipakos’ contract for 2 years.

Bajević resigned from Olympiacos in June 2005. In July, Olympiacos hired Norwegian manager Trond Sollied. Sollied and Philipakos experienced a tumultuous relationship. Sollied brought in Nigerian Haruna Babangida to play Philipakos’ position, making Philipakos of little use. In early September 2005, Peter requested to leave the club, and was made to train on the side at Olympiacos’ Renti training complex until a resolution could be found. On October 31, 2005, Philipakos was officially released.

Philipakos is the only Greek-American to have ever played in a league match for Olympiacos.

==== Aris ====
On January 25, 2006, Philipakos signed a 6-month contract with Aris to finish the 2005–06 season. That season Aris was playing in B' Ethniki for the just the second time in the club's long history, and during the winter transfer period manager Nikos Anastopoulos hired Philipakos and defender Efthimios Kouloucheris—who had also been recently released by Olympiacos. Philipakos made a total of 6 appearances for Aris—all as a substitute, in between injuries.

On April 16, 2006, Aris took on Ethnikos Asteras at Aris’ Kleanthis Vikelidis Stadium— Aris dominated the match but could not convert any of their chances to score, and the match ended 0-0. After the match, Philipakos grabbed his shirt and ripped it from the neck down as he left the field. Aris fans became outraged that he would do such a thing to the club symbol. Philipakos apologized, but was not forgiven. Less than a week later and a week before the contract expired, Philipakos and Aris agreed to terminate the contract early.

==== Ethnikos Piraeus ====
On July 26, 2006, Philipakos signed a 2-year contract with another B' Ethniki club, Piraeus-based Ethnikos Piraeus. Ethnikos had had one of the stronger teams in Greek football for decades, but after being relegated for the first time in 1990, the club bounced between A' and B' Ethniki for a few seasons and then stalled in B' Ethniki after 1999. Ahead of the 2006–07 season, ambitious Ethnikos signed up former Olympiacos and FC Barcelona star Giovanni and former AEK and Sevilla FC star Vasilios Tsiartas to lead the team and Philipakos joined as well. Philipakos’ experience with the club was a fiasco. Shortly after Philipakos signed, President Nikos Pirounias agreed to sell controlling interest to a group of investors fronted by Cypriot businessman Fivos Moridis. From the time of Moridis’ arrival, Philipakos was unpaid and sat on the bench. Giovanni and Tsiartas as well as several other summer signings all left the club in the middle of the season. In January 2007 Philipakos initially took legal action to receive his unpaid wages, but he dropped the case so that he could sign elsewhere. Philipakos officially cut ties with Ethnikos in February 2007, but because the release came after the close of the winter transfer period, he was unable to be registered by a European club for the remainder of the 2006–07 season. Philipakos made only 3 appearances for Ethnikos.

==== New York Red Bulls ====
Philipakos returned to his native New York and joined the New York Red Bulls of Major League Soccer at preseason training in Bradenton, Florida for a two-week trial. He did not play well and did not sign a contract. Bruce Arena, sporting director and head coach of New York, said, "I don't think he showed too well. He was pretty unfit and we just didn't have the time for him. He obviously is a player who has some potential there. We are not able to wait four to six weeks."

==== FK SIAD Most ====
In April 2007, he went on trial with FK SIAD Most of the Czech first division, the Gambrinus Liga. Philipakos signed a 1-year contract (with a 1-year option) with the club on May 9, 2007, under manager Zdeněk Ščasný.

In a friendly match against SK Slovan Varnsdorf just prior to the start of the 2007–08 season Philipakos suffered an athletic pubalgia (more commonly referred to as a "sports hernia") on his right side and tore his adductor longus muscle on the same side. His doctors did not detect the sports hernia. Once the adductor healed, Philipakos made his Gambrinus Liga debut against FK Mladá Boleslav on September 16, 2007. Philipakos struggled with pain and could not continue to play after his debut. Several more misdiagnoses left him in limbo for several weeks, but a trip to Germany finally revealed the hernia. In November 2007 Philipakos had the problem surgically repaired at the Hernienzentrum clinic in Munich by world-renowned hernia operation specialist Ulrike Muschaweck.

Philipakos fully recovered and returned to normal training in late November 2007, just prior to the beginning of the league's winter break; by that time though, Most was in last place and poised for relegation. In anticipation of the drop, Most cut layers, top scorer Goce Toleski was sold to Slavia Prague, Andrew Hainault was loaned to Sparta Prague, and the club offered to work out a release with several other players, including Philipakos. Philipakos went in January 2008.

==== Ethnikos Piraeus (second stint) ====
While Philipakos was in the Czech Republic, Nikos Pirounias retook control of Ethnikos. In February 2008, Pirounias called on the American to return to Ethnikos. Though unable to play league matches, since the transfer period had already closed, he rejoined the team in training and signed a 1-year contract with the club to play the 2008–09 season. Philipakos remained healthy throughout the 2008–09 season and appeared 12 in all matches, a career-high. Philipakos chose not to re-sign with Ethnikos.

==== Chersonissos ====
In August 2009, Philipakos accepted a trial invitation from Danish club Vejle, but he returned to Greece after only a few days, suffering from an ankle injury. In the next transfer window, in January 2010, Philipakos signed a 6-month contract with Greek Football League 2 club Chersonissos. Philipakos re-signed with Chersonissos for the 2010–11 season, returning as team captain.

==== Iraklis Psachna ====
On September 9, 2011, Philipakos signed a 1-year contract with Greek club Ionikos. In late September, Ionikos was found guilty of committing contract forgery during the 2010–11 season and was relegated to Football League 2. Soon after the club voluntarily switched to Delta Ethniki. As a result, Ionikos' players were free to sign with another club.

On October 14, 2011, Philipakos signed a 1-year contract with Football League club Iraklis Psachna.

On November 27, 2011, in the fourth week of the 2011-12 Football League season, Philipakos played in Iraklis Psaxna's first win in the Greek second tier in club history—a 2–0 defeat of Diagoras.

==== Vyzas Megara ====
On January 23, 2012, Philipakos completed a mid-season transfer to Greek Football League club Vyzas Megara. However, the club was unable to pay its players and Philipakos was one of several players to sue for unpaid wages.

== International career ==
On March 18, 2005, Philipakos was called by the Greek Under-21 National Team for UEFA European Under-21 Championship qualification matches against Georgia and Albania. Philipakos declined the invitation, citing a desire to focus on Olympiacos duties, while also adding he was not ready to close the door on the prospect of one day representing the United States.

== Honors ==
Olympiacos

- Alpha Ethniki: 2004–05
- Greek Cup: 2004–05
