= Lazaros Theodorelis =

Greek footballer (born 1982)

Personal information
- Date of birth: 14 January 1982 (age 44)
- Place of birth: Drama, Greece
- Height: 1.84 m (6 ft 0 in)
- Position: Centre-back

Senior career*
| Years | Team | Apps | (Gls) |
| 2003–2005 | Doxa Drama | 51 | (2) |
| 2005–2006 | Chalkida | - | (-) |
| 2006–2008 | Agios Dimitrios | - | (-) |
| 2008–2011 | Kavala | 71 | (3) |
| 2011–2012 | Panachaiki | 6 | (0) |
| 2012–2013 | Panachaiki | 0 | (0) |
| 2013– | Doxa Drama | | |
- * Club domestic league appearances and goals as of 23:23, 12 January 2012 (UTC)

Lazaros Theodorelis (Greek: Λάζαρος Θεοδωρέλης; born 14 January 1982) is a Greek former professional footballer who played as a centre-back.

== Career ==
Born in Drama, Theodorelis began his professional career with Doxa Drama F.C. in July 2003 and played for Super League Greece side Kavala during the three seasons, from 2008 to 2011.
