= Charalampos Moysiadis =

Greek footballer

Personal information
- Full name: Charalampos Moysiadis
- Date of birth: 28 February 1976 (age 50)
- Place of birth: Greece
- Height: 1.73 m (5 ft 8 in)
- Position: Midfielder

Senior career*
Years	Team	Apps	(Gls)
1997	Pierikos	10	(1)
1998–1999	Kerkyra	9	(0)
1999–2000	Poseidon Michaniona	30	(1)
2000–2002	Patraikos	27	(1)
2002–2003	Kerkyra	26	(0)
2003–2004	Paniliakos	25	(0)
2004–2006	Aris	27	(0)
2006–2007	Agrotikos Asteras		
2007–2008	Gloria Buzău		
2008–2009	Makedonikos		
2009–2010	Pyrsos Grevena		
- * Club domestic league appearances and goals as of 2 May 2008

Charalampos Moysiadis (Greek: Χαράλαμπος Μωυσιάδης; born 28 February 1976) is a Greek footballer who plays as a midfielder.

== Club career ==
Moysiadis previously played in the Super League Greece with Paniliakos and Aris
