= AE Giannena F.C. =

Greek football club

A.E. Giannena
- Full name: A.E. Giannena Football Club
- Founded: 2004; 22 years ago
- Ground: Panepirotan National Athletic Center, Zosimades Stadium,
- Capacity: 2,050
- Chairman: Andreas Kontogiannis
- Manager: Antonios Dimitriou
- League: Epirus FCA First Division
- 2025–26: Epirus FCA Second Division, 2nd (promoted)
- Website: https://web.archive.org/web/20070709072253/http://www.aegiannena.gr/
Home colours	Away colours

AE Giannena (Greek: Αθλητική Ένωση Γιάννενα) is a football club based in Ioannina, Greece. It was founded in 2004. The club was the winner of 5th Group of Delta Ethniki in 2005 and was promoted to Gamma Ethniki for first time in its history. AE Giannena remained two seasons in Gamma Ethniki and since then the club relegated to the local divisions.

== Crest ==
The emblem of AE Giannena features the symbol of Dodona and Emperor Justinian I.

== Stadium and facilities ==
AE Giannena normally plays in Panepirotan National Athletic Center but the team use Zosimades, the main stadium in Ioannina.

== Honours ==
- Delta Ethniki: 2005
