= Ermogenis Christofi =

Cypriot footballer (born 1974)

Personal information
- Date of birth: 21 September 1974 (age 52)
- Position: Midfielder

Senior career*
Years	Team	Apps	(Gls)
1998–2004	AEL Limassol FC		
2004	Anorthosis Famagusta FC		

International career
1999	Cyprus	1	(0)
- * Club domestic league appearances and goals

Ermogenis Christofi (born 21 September 1974) is a retired Cypriot football midfielder.
