= AEK Arena (cancelled project) =

Proposed football stadium in West Attica, Greece

Coordinates: 38.0965°N 23.7024°E

AEK Arena was a football stadium project in West Attica, Greece. The purpose of the project was the construction of a modern football stadium to be used by AEK Athens F.C..

== Location ==
As it was announced on September 6, 2007 the stadium would be built in Ano Liosia, a northwestern suburb of Athens. A contract was signed between the Greek State and AEK Athens F.C. and all the details of the project were finalised.

== Capacity and other facilities ==
The stadium was to have had a capacity of at least 50,000 spectators according to then AEK Athens F.C. chairman Demis Nikolaidis and it was to fulfill all the UEFA criteria in order to be regarded a 5-star venue. It was also to feature a shopping mall of around 50,000 square meters, a multiplex cinema as well as numerous cafes and restaurants.

== Stadium naming ==
The name "AEK Arena" was in use as a temporary name for the project and had never been confirmed as the official name of the stadium. Another name strongly contemplated for the stadium was "New Nikos Goumas Stadium", noting also the possibility for the stadium to have been eventually named "LG Stadium" or "LG Arena" after a sponsorship deal with electronics giant LG Corporation.

== Cancellation ==
The stadium was cancelled due to financial problems of the club and broad negative reaction from the fan base. On July 10, 2013, the new owner of AEK Athens F.C., Dimitris Melissanidis, announced that the club shall build a new stadium in Nea Filadelfia, at the spot where Nikos Goumas Stadium, the historic home ground of AEK Athens, was once situated.
