= Ivan Rusev (footballer) =

Bulgarian footballer

Personal information
- Full name: Ivan Nikolaev Rusev
- Date of birth: 10 May 1979 (age 47)
- Place of birth: Burgas, Bulgaria
- Height: 1.76 m (5 ft 9 in)
- Position: Midfielder

Youth career
- 1990–1998: Chernomorets Burgas

Senior career*
Years	Team	Apps	(Gls)
1996–1999	Chernomorets Burgas	34	(8)
1996–1997	→ Litex Lovech (loan)		
1999–2000	Litex Lovech		
2000	Spartak Varna	5	(2)
2000	→ Egaleo (loan)	16	(8)
2001–2005	AEK Athens	35	(4)
2001	→ Athinaikos (loan)	21	(7)
2001–2002	→ Apollon Smyrnis (loan)	23	(5)
2002	→ Athinaikos (loan)	14	(3)
2005–2008	Levadiakos	65	(13)
2008–2010	Diagoras	60	(16)
2010	Trikala	15	(3)
2011	OFI	16	(5)
2012	Pierikos	17	(3)
2012–2013	Doxa Drama	32	(4)
2013–2014	Panelefsiniakos		
2014–2015	AE Perama		
2015	Agioi Anargiroi	5	(6)
2016–2019	Diana Ilioupoli		
Total		358+	(87+)

International career
- Bulgaria U21
- * Club domestic league appearances and goals

Ivan Rusev (Bulgarian: Иван Русев; born 10 May 1979) is a Bulgarian former football player who played as a midfielder and manager. His nickname is "The Little Jangur" (Bulgarian: Малкия Джангър) due to his father's nickname. Since 2020, he has Hellenic citizenship.

== Club career ==
Rusev started his football career in 1990 at Chernomorets Burgas where he after brief spells at Litex Lovech in 1996 and 2000, he joined Spartak Varna, while in 1996 he was named the best young footballer in of the year. He moved to Greece in 2000 where he was loaned to Egaleo and stood out for 6 months, as a result of which attracted the interest of AEK Athens. Thus on 19 January 2001 he was transferred to AEK Athens, but on 30 January he was loaned to Athinaikos. Upon his return in the summer of 2001 he loaned again to Apollon Athens. The following seasons he emereged as a regular in the sqad of AEK. He started in both matches against Eindhoven for the group stage of the UEFA Champions League.

In the summer of 2005 after his contract was expired, Rusev joined Levadiakos, where he spent three years. Afterwards he moved to Diagoras for two season, where he had a successful spell, scoring the most goals of his career in a team. He then had brief spells at Trikala, OFI, Pierikos, Doxa Drama, while from 2013 to December 2014 he played at Panelefsiniakos. After a brief spell at AE Peramatos in 2015 he played at Agioi Anargiroi in the local divisions of Athens. He retired in 2019 at Diana Ilioupoli.

== Managerial career ==
In 2018, he started his career as a manager. He started in the youth sector of the club where he played last as a footballer.

== Personal life ==
Rusev is the son of PFC Nesebar legend, Nikolai who was nicknamed "The Jangur".
