= F.C. Lailapas =

Lailapas
- Full name: Αθλητικός Ποδοσφαιρικός Σύλλογος Λαίλαπας (Lailapas Football Club)
- Nickname: Λιοντάρια (Lions)
- Founded: 1925; refounded in 2009
- Ground: Fafalion Stadium, Chios (town)
- Capacity: 3,500
- Manager: Evgenios Kreatsoulas
- League: Chios FCA Second Division
- 2025–26: Chios FCA Second Division, 4th
Home colours	Away colours

Lailapas Football Club (Greek: Αθλητικός Ποδοσφαιρικός Σύλλογος Λαίλαπας; transliterated Athlitikos Podosfairikos Syllogos Lailapas), is a Greek football club based in Chios, Greece, competing in the Fourth Division of Greek football. The team play their home matches at the Fafalion Stadium in Vrontados.

== History ==
Having originally been founded as Λαίλαψ in 1925, F.C. Lailapas is one of Greece's oldest and formerly most competitive clubs. Its period of greatest success came in the 1920s, 1930s and 1940s during which it won an impressive number of titles. In December 1930, Lailapas hosted the then champion of İzmir, Karşıyaka S.K. in a match of great historical significance, given the state of Greco-Turkish relations over the previous decade. Due to bad weather however, the match was abandoned shortly after kick-off. It was widely heralded as the first meeting between Greek and Turkish football teams, competitive or otherwise in the wake of the Greco-Turkish War of 1919-1922.

In the post-war period, Lailapas experienced a period of decline and was eventually forced to close down following financial difficulties in the mid-1950s. The club has since been re-founded on two occasions, most recently in 2009.
