= 1999–2000 AEK Athens F.C. season =

AEK Athens
1999–2000 season
- Chairman: Kostas Generakis (until 11 November); Stefanos Mamatzis (until 11 January); Cornelius Sierhuis
- Manager: Ljubiša Tumbaković (until 7 January); Takis Karagiozopoulos (interim, until 9 January); Giannis Pathiakakis
- Stadium: Nikos Goumas Stadium (Main); Nea Smyrni Stadium (UEFA Cup)
- Alpha Ethniki: 3rd
- Greek Cup: Winners
- UEFA Champions League: Third qualifying round
- UEFA Cup: Round of 32
- Top goalscorer: League: Demis Nikolaidis (22); All: Demis Nikolaidis (36)
- Highest home attendance: 17,786 vs AIK (11 August 1999)
- Lowest home attendance: 364 vs Akratitos (13 October 1999)
- Average home league attendance: 4,668
- Biggest win: AEK Athens 6–0 Trikala
- Biggest defeat: Olympiacos 3–0 AEK Athens
Home colours	Away colours	Third colours

The 1999–2000 season was the 76th season in the existence of AEK Athens F.C. and the 41st consecutive season in the top flight of Greek football. They competed in the Alpha Ethniki, the Greek Cup, the UEFA Champions League and the UEFA Cup. The season began on 7 August 1999 and finished on 27 May 2000.

== Kits ==
Supplier: Kappa
Sponsor(s): Marfin

Home	Away	Third

== Overview ==
From the middle of the previous season, Dimitris Melissanidis had taken over the management of the club and was credited with the club's success in reaching the Champions League qualifiers. Melissanidis decided to follow the example of Dušan Bajević's success and turned to the Serbian market in order to build a title-winning team. The promising Serbian manager Ljubiša Tumbaković from Partizan was hired and brought Matijašević, Petrić and Bjeković with him. The highlight was the loan signing of Dragan Ćirić from Barcelona, which excited the supporters, who rushed to the airport to welcome him. At the beginning of September a major earthquake struck Parnitha, causing damage to part of Nikos Goumas Stadium, which was deemed unsuitable. As a result, AEK were forced to play most of their home matches at Nea Smyrni Stadium.

The season started with enthusiasm, title expectations and a draw in the Champions League qualifiers that gave AEK confidence in their chances of reaching the group stage, which would have secured financial independence and self-sufficiency. Amid an atmosphere of excitement surrounding the club's return to the Champions League, AEK were drawn against Swedish AIK. The team of Tumbaković did not appear ready for the first leg at Nikos Goumas Stadium in August and the Swedish champions left with a 0–0 draw. Tumbaković had assured that the team would be better prepared for the rematch. Indeed, AEK played more offensively and created chances, but an error by Atmatsidis resulted in conceding a goal which eventually cost them the qualification for the group stage. Thus, AEK continued their European campaign in the UEFA Cup.

Disappointed after their elimination, AEK were drawn against the Georgian Torpedo Kutaisi. In a poor match at Ramaz Shengelia Stadium, the yellow-blacks again appeared unmotivated, but secured a 1–0 victory in the end of the match thanks to a goal by Zikos. The rematch at Nea Smyrni, AEK secured qualification with a 6–1 victory against the Georgians. The next opponent for AEK was the Hungarian MTK Budapest. At the Hidegkuti Nándor Stadium AEK put in a poor performance and were stymied by Henk ten Cate's tactical approach. Fortunately Ćirić scored midway through the second half and reduced to 2–1, a scoreline that could be overturned in Athens. The rematch in Nea Smyrni almost turned out to be a nightmare for AEK, as the well-prepared MTK put them under pressure. Ćirić by scoring another penalty fifteen minutes before the end of the match, securing qualification for AEK. In the draw for the third round of the UEFA Cup AEK came across Monaco. On 23 November in a difficult match, Monaco left Nea Filadelfeia with a 2–2 draw. In the second leg at Stade Louis II, AEK chased the qualification, but a miscalculation by Atmatsidis, led to a goal by Simone just after half an hour. For the rest of the match AEK were searching for an equalizer and Monaco limited themselves to counter-attacks. In the end, the 1–0 scoreline remained and AEK exited to the European Cups and the new millennium found them participating only in domestic competitions.

In the league Tumbaković did not start well, losing both the derbies against Panathinaikos and Olympiacos, which led to protests from the supporters early in the season. Moreover, the elimination from the Champions League, led in Melissanidis gradual withdrawal from the management. The multinational owners of ENIC, took the matter into their hands and appointed the first foreign president in history of the club, Cornelius Sierhuis. In the competitive part, Tumbaković brought inconsistent results and after a home defeat by Panionios and since the club was also been eliminated from the UEFA Cup he was removed from the bench. Among other things, his transfers proved to be mediocre, with Ćirić not being able to live up to the expectations surrounding his reputation. The situation led to Takis Karagiozopoulos taking charge as an interim manager, before Giannis Pathiakakis was appointed as his successor. The new manager raised the morale of the team, but also lost the derbies and AEK finished in the third place, far from the first two places.

In the Cup, AEK were drawn in the 8th group with Trikala, Egaleo, Athinaikos, Akratitos and A.O. Karditsa and finished first after winning all of their matches. They advanced through the round of 32 without an opponent and in the round of 16 faced Trikala again, defeating them 6–0. The draw for the quarter-finals placed AEK against Olympiacos. At Olympic Stadium, AEK took the lead with Vasilios Lakis, but then came under pressure from Olympiacos, which resulted in an equaliser by Alexandris to make it 1–1. In the rematch at Nea Filadelfeia Olympiacos were swept aside, trailing 3–0 by the 48th minute. In the semi-finals with Panionios was a formality, as AEK won 4–1 and lost 2–1 at Nea Smyrni. AEK reached the final, where they faced Ionikos. On 10 May at the Olympic Stadium, Ionikos put up a relatively strong resistance and despite the goal by Nikolaidis in the first half, they maintained the narrow 1–0 scoreline until late in the match. Two goals by Petkov and Maladenis followed and AEK won the Cup amid celebrations, with Pathiakakis winning his first major title. Highlights of the match included the fair-play gesture by Nikolaidis, who after scoring a goal with his hand, asked the referee to disallow it. The gesture later led the International Olympic Committee to honour him for his sportsmanship.

Demis Nikolaidis who appeared to regain his form during the second half of the season, scored 22 league goals and was one of the positive elements of the season after winning the Cup, as the team failed to win any derby.

== Management team ==
Position	Staff
Manager	(Greece) Giannis Pathiakakis
Assistant manager	(Greece) Antonis Minou
Goalkeeping coach	(Greece) Lakis Stergioudas
Goalkeeping coach	(Greece) Antonis Minou
Fitness Coach	(Greece) Nikolaos Karydas
Academy director	(Greece) Andreas Stamatiadis
Academy manager	(Greece) Giorgos Karafeskos
Head of Medical	(Greece) Lakis Nikolaou

== Players ==
=== Squad information ===
NOTE: The players are the ones that have been announced by the AEK Athens' press release. No edits should be made unless a player arrival or exit is announced. Updated 27 May 2000, 23:59 UTC+3.

No.	Player	Nat.	Position(s)	Date of birth (Age)	Signed	Previous club	Transfer fee	Contract until
Goalkeepers
1	Ilias Atmatsidis (Captain)	(Greece)	GK	24 April 1969 (aged 31)	1992	(Greece) Pontioi Veria	₯40,000,000	2002
15	Chrysostomos Michailidis	(Greece)	GK	15 January 1975 (aged 25)	1997	(Greece) Eordaikos	Free	2002
22	Lefteris Petkaris	(Greece)	GK	5 March 1982 (aged 18)	1999	(Greece) Makedonikos	Free	2001
Defenders
2	Traianos Dellas	(Greece)	CB	31 January 1976 (aged 24)	1999	(England) Sheffield United	Free	2002
5	Nikos Kostenoglou	(Greece)	CB / RB	3 October 1970 (aged 29)	1994	(Greece) Skoda Xanthi	₯70,000,000	2003
12	Charis Kopitsis	(Greece)	RB / RM / LB / LM	5 March 1969 (aged 31)	1992	(Greece) Panionios	Free	2001
17	Michalis Kasapis (Vice-captain)	(Greece)	LB / LM	6 August 1971 (aged 28)	1993	(Greece) Levadiakos	₯25,000,000	2002
21	Vaios Karagiannis (Vice-captain 2)	(Greece)	LB / CB	25 June 1968 (aged 32)	1990	(Greece) A.O. Karditsa	₯11,000,000	2000
25	Giannis Kalitzakis	(Greece)	CB	10 February 1966 (aged 34)	1997	(Greece) Panathinaikos	₯23,800,000	2000
27	Filippo Dal Moro	(Italy)	LB	11 August 1970 (aged 29)	2000	(Italy) Roma	₯30,000,000	2000
29	Davide Belotti	(Italy)	RB / CB	24 May 1972 (aged 28)	2000	(Italy) Vicenza	₯30,000,000	2000
32	Michalis Kapsis	(Greece)	CB	18 October 1973 (aged 26)	1999	(Greece) Ethnikos Piraeus	₯80,000,000	2003
—	Georgios Paraskevaidis	(Greece)	CB	9 October 1982 (aged 17)	2000	(Greece) AEK Athens U20	—	2005
Midfielders
6	Dimitris Markos	(Greece)	CM / DM / LB / LM	31 January 1971 (aged 29)	1998	(Greece) Kalamata	Free	2001
7	Christos Maladenis	(Greece)	CM / RM / LM / AM / DM / RW / LW / SS	23 May 1974 (aged 26)	1995	(Greece) Skoda Xanthi	₯100,000,000	2003
8	Toni Savevski	(North Macedonia)	CM / LM / DM	14 July 1963 (aged 36)	1988	(North Macedonia) Vardar	₯34,000,000	2001
10	Dragan Ćirić	(Federal Republic of Yugoslavia)	AM	15 September 1974 (aged 25)	1999	(Spain) Barcelona	₯300,000,000	2002
14	Akis Zikos	(Greece)	DM / CM	1 June 1974 (aged 26)	1998	(Greece) Skoda Xanthi	₯130,000,000	2002
16	Arnar Grétarsson	(Iceland)	CM / DM	20 February 1972 (aged 28)	1997	(Iceland) Leiftur	Free	2000
18	Evripidis Katsavos	(Greece)	CM / DM / RM	14 September 1973 (aged 26)	1997	(Greece) Veria	Free	2001
23	Vasilios Lakis	(Greece)	RM / RW / AM / CM / RB	10 September 1976 (aged 23)	1998	(Greece) Paniliakos	₯320,000,000	2003
24	Vladimir Matijašević	(Federal Republic of Yugoslavia)	DM / CM / RB / LB / CB	10 May 1978 (aged 22)	1999	(Federal Republic of Yugoslavia) Vojvodina	₯400,000,000	2002
26	Giorgos Passios	(Greece) (Australia)	DM / CM / CB	4 May 1980 (aged 20)	1997	(Greece) AEK Athens U20	—	2003
28	Milen Petkov	(Bulgaria)	DM / CM / AM / RM / LM	12 January 1974 (aged 26)	2000	(Bulgaria) CSKA Sofia	₯260,000,000	2003
30	Pablo Cantero	(Argentina)	CM	30 October 1977 (aged 22)	2000	(Argentina) Estudiantes	₯500,000,000	2005
—	Mattheos Platakis	(Greece)	AM / ST / SS	30 June 1977 (aged 23)	1996	(Greece) Phinikas Polichini	Free	2000
Forwards
9	Nenad Bjeković	(Federal Republic of Yugoslavia)	ST	17 February 1974 (aged 26)	1999	(Federal Republic of Yugoslavia) Partizan	₯250,000,000	2001
11	Demis Nikolaidis (Vice-captain 3)	(Greece) (Germany)	ST / SS	17 September 1973 (aged 26)	1996	(Greece) Apollon Athens	₯330,000,000	2004
19	Giorgos Kavazis	(Cyprus)	ST	15 January 1980 (aged 20)	1999	(Cyprus) Apollon Limassol	₯40,000,000	2003
20	Sotiris Konstantinidis	(Greece)	RW / LW / RM / LM / AM	19 April 1979 (aged 21)	1999	(Greece) Iraklis	Free	2004
31	Ilias Anastasakos	(Greece)	ST / LW / LM	3 March 1978 (aged 22)	1995	(Greece) A.O. Dafniou	Free	2002
Left during Winter Transfer Window
3	Gordan Petrić	(Federal Republic of Yugoslavia)	CB	30 July 1969 (aged 30)	1999	(Scotland) Hearts	Free	2002

== Transfers ==
=== In ===
==== Summer ====
No.	Pos.	Player	From	Fee	Date	Contract Until	Source
2	DF	(Greece) Traianos Dellas	(England) Sheffield United	Free transfer	1 July 1999	30 June 2002	
3	DF	(Federal Republic of Yugoslavia) Gordan Petrić	(England) Crystal Palace	Free transfer	2 July 1999	30 June 2002	
9	FW	(Federal Republic of Yugoslavia) Nenad Bjeković	(Federal Republic of Yugoslavia) Partizan	₯250,000,000	5 July 1999	30 June 2001	
20	FW	(Greece) Sotiris Konstantinidis	(Greece) Iraklis	Free transfer	1 July 1999	30 June 2004	
22	GK	(Greece) Lefteris Petkaris	(Greece) Makedonikos	Free transfer	24 June 1999	30 June 2001	
24	MF	(Federal Republic of Yugoslavia) Vladimir Matijašević	(Federal Republic of Yugoslavia) Vojvodina	₯400,000,000	5 August 1999	30 June 2002	
—	GK	(Greece) Dionysis Chiotis	(Greece) Ethnikos Piraeus	Loan return	1 July 1999	30 June 2005	
—	DF	(Greece) Vangelis Kefalas	(Greece) Kavala	Loan return	1 July 1999	30 June 2000	
—	MF	(Greece) Triantafyllos Macheridis	(Greece) PAOK	Loan return	1 July 1999	30 June 2000	
—	MF	(Greece) Michalis Tzivelekis	(Greece) Panelefsiniakos	Free transfer	8 June 1999	30 June 2000	
—	MF	(Greece) Mattheos Platakis	(Greece) Ethnikos Piraeus	Loan return	1 July 1999	30 June 2000	
—	FW	(Greece) Paraschos Zouboulis	(Greece) PAOK	Free transfer	1 July 1999	30 June 2003	
—	FW	(Greece) Georgios Trichias	(Greece) Panelefsiniakos	Loan return	1 July 1999	31 December 2005	

==== Winter ====
No.	Pos.	Player	From	Fee	Date	Contract Until	Source
28	MF	(Bulgaria) Milen Petkov	(Bulgaria) CSKA Sofia	₯260,000,000	27 January 2000	30 June 2003	
30	MF	(Argentina) Pablo Cantero	(Argentina) Estudiantes	₯500,000,000	31 January 2000	30 June 2005	
31	FW	(Greece) Ilias Anastasakos	(Greece) Apollon Athens	Loan return	1 January 2000	30 June 2002	
—	DF	(Greece) Georgios Paraskevaidis	(Greece) AEK Athens U20	Promotion	1 January 2000	30 June 2005	

=== Out ===
==== Summer ====
No.	Pos.	Player	To	Fee	Date	Source
5	DF	(North Macedonia) Boban Babunski	(Spain) Logroñés	Free transfer	28 July 1999	
9	FW	(Greece) Paraschos Zouboulis	(Greece) PAOK	Loan return	1 July 1999	
10	FW	(Liberia) Christopher Wreh	(England) Arsenal	Loan return	1 July 1999	
17	GK	(Greece) Kostas Daditsos	Free agent	End of contract	1 July 1999	
19	MF	(Liberia) Kelvin Sebwe	(Greece) Iraklis	Free transfer	6 August 1999	
20	FW	(Greece) Daniel Batista	(Greece) Aris	Contract termination	30 July 1999	
22	GK	(Greece) Vasilis Karagiannis	(Greece) Ethnikos Piraeus	End of contract	30 July 1999	
23	MF	(Germany) Alberto Méndez	(England) Arsenal	Loan return	1 July 1999	
24	DF	(Australia) Alvin Ceccoli	(Australia) Wolves	Loan return	1 July 1999	
27	MF	(Federal Republic of Yugoslavia) Branko Milovanović	Free agent	Contract termination	7 October 1999	
31	DF	(Romania) Anton Doboș	(Greece) Ethnikos Piraeus	End of contract	2 August 1999	
—	DF	(Greece) Vangelis Kefalas	(Greece) Kavala	Free transfer	1 July 1999	
—	MF	(Greece) Triantafyllos Macheridis	(Greece) PAOK	₯100,000,000	1 July 1999	
—	MF	(Greece) Michalis Tzivelekis	(Greece) Panionios	Contract termination	14 July 1999	
—	FW	(Greece) Paraschos Zouboulis	(Greece) Skoda Xanthi	Contract termination	16 August 1999	

==== Winter ====
No.	Pos.	Player	To	Fee	Date	Source
3	DF	(Federal Republic of Yugoslavia) Gordan Petrić	(Scotland) Hearts	₯250,000,000	2 December 1999	

=== Loan in ===
==== Summer ====
No.	Pos.	Player	From	Fee	Date	Until	Option to buy	Source
10	MF	(Federal Republic of Yugoslavia) Dragan Ćirić	(Spain) Barcelona	₯300,000,000	25 June 1999	30 June 2000	✓	

==== Winter ====
No.	Pos.	Player	From	Fee	Date	Until	Option to buy	Source
27	DF	(Italy) Filippo Dal Moro	(Italy) Roma	₯30,000,000	31 January 2000	30 June 2000	✓	
29	DF	(Italy) Davide Belotti	(Italy) Vicenza	₯30,000,000	31 January 2000	30 June 2000	✓	

=== Loan out ===
==== Summer ====
No.	Pos.	Player	To	Fee	Date	Until	Option to buy	Source
26	FW	(Greece) Giorgos Kartalis	(Greece) Ethnikos Piraeus	Free	1 July 1999	30 June 2000	✗	
—	GK	(Greece) Dionysis Chiotis	(Greece) Proodeftiki	Free	1 July 1999	30 June 2000	✗	
—	FW	(Greece) Georgios Trichias	(Greece) Athinaikos	Free	1 July 1999	30 June 2000	✗	

=== Contract renewals ===
No.	Pos.	Player	Date	Former Exp. Date	New Exp. Date	Source
11	FW	(Greece) Demis Nikolaidis	30 July 1999	30 June 2001	30 June 2004	

=== Overall transfer activity ===
==== Expenditure ====
Summer: ▼ ₯950,000,000

Winter: ▼ ₯820,000,000

Total: ▼ ₯1,770,000,000

==== Income ====
Summer: ▲ ₯100,000,000

Winter: ▲ ₯250,000,000

Total: ▲ ₯350,000,000

==== Net Totals ====
Summer: ▼ ₯850,000,000

Winter: ▼ ₯570,000,000

Total: ▼ ₯1,420,000,000

== Pre-season and friendlies ==
8 July 1999 Friendly	Vichy	1–11	AEK Athens	Vichy
20:00 EEST (UTC+3)	Vilan 5'	Report	Zouboulis 39', 41'; Nikolaidis 45'; Konstantinidis 51', 88'; Bjeković 60', 74', 80'; Dellas 76'; Grétarsson 81'; Ćirić 86'	Attendance: 500
Note: Petkaris played for about 35 minutes with Vichy against his club, due to the injury of the goalkeeper of Vichy.

10 July 1999 Friendly	Saint-Étienne	1–0	AEK Athens	Chiquilín
19:30 EEST (UTC+3)	Alex 41'	Report	Nikolaidis (red card) 60'

13 July 1999 Friendly	Vichy / Clermon Feran (mixed)	4–12	AEK Athens	Vichy
20:00 EEST (UTC+3)	Cicard 42', 65', 84', 89'	Report	Nikolaidis 3', 31', 35'; Grétarsson 8'; Kavazis 11'; Maladenis 14', 34'; Lakis 30'; Konstantinidis 57', 86'; Bjeković 77'; Milovanović 79'

17 July 1999 Friendly	Bastia	0–1	AEK Athens	Avignon
19:00 EEST (UTC+3)		Report	Nikolaidis 27'	Stadium: Parc des Sports; Attendance: 5,000

18 July 1999 Friendly	Sfaxien	2–2	AEK Athens	Vichy
19:00 EEST (UTC+3)	Ben Khaled 70'; Ben Younes 77' (pen.)	Report	Zouboulis 44', 45'	Referee: Le Mouël (France)

21 July 1999 Friendly	Monaco	0–1	AEK Athens	Sisteron
19:15 EEST (UTC+3)		Report	Nikolaidis 3'	Attendance: 2,500

25 July 1999 Friendly	Marko	0–3	AEK Athens	Markopoulo
18:30 EEST (UTC+3)		Report	Maladenis 10'; Nikolaidis 21'; Grétarsson 81'	Stadium: Municipal Markopoulo Stadium; Attendance: 2,000; Referee: Giannis Papapetrou (Athens)

28 July 1999 Friendly	AEK Athens	7–0	Akratitos	Thrakomakedones
18:30 EEST (UTC+3)	Kasapis 4'; Bjeković 22'; Ćirić 33' (pen.), 44'; Maladenis 67'; Zouboulis 70', 75'	Report		Stadium: AEK Athens' Training Complex; Attendance: 700; Referee: Tasos Dimou
Note: The fitness coach of AEK, Tasos Dimou was the referee of the match.

31 July 1999 Nova Supersports Cup	AEK Athens	3–2	Leicester City	Nea Filadelfeia
22:00 EEST (UTC+3)	Ćirić 17'; Savevski 25'; Maladenis 44'	Report	Zagorakis 6', 60' (pen.); Heskey (yellow card); Elliott (yellow card)	Stadium: Nikos Goumas Stadium; Attendance: 10,000; Referee: Georgios Psychomanis (Athens)

1 August 1999 Nova Supersports Cup	AEK Athens	4–2	Hertha Berlin	Nea Filadelfeia
22:00 EEST (UTC+3)	Bjeković 44'; Nikolaidis 51', 66'; Ćirić 64' (pen.); Lakis (yellow card)	Report	Tretschok 15'; Neuendorf 50'; Sverison (yellow card); Dárdai (yellow card)	Stadium: Nikos Goumas Stadium; Attendance: 9,599; Referee: Giorgos Fasolis (Athens)

4 August 1999 Friendly	AEK Athens	13–0	Ilisiakos	Thrakomakedones
18:30 EEST (UTC+3)	Bjeković 16'; Milovanović 33'; Dellas 51'; Konstantinidis 54', 77', 80'; Sebwe 55', 58', 65'; Grétarsson 63', 66', 83'; Kavazis 68'	Report		Stadium: AEK Athens' Training Complex; Referee: Tasos Dimou
Note: The fitness coach of AEK, Tasos Dimou who was the referee of the match ended the match at the 84th minute.

1 September 1999 Friendly	Kallithea	2–3	AEK Athens	Kallithea
18:00 EEST (UTC+3)	Cerović 6'; Zacharopoulos 40'	Report	Grétarsson 26'; Kalitzakis 52'; Dellas 64'	Stadium: Grigoris Lambrakis Stadium

12 September 1999 Charity match	Panionios	1–2	AEK Athens	Nea Smyrni
17:00 EEST (UTC+3)	Pantić 21'	Report	Nikolaidis 35', 39'	Stadium: Nea Smyrni Stadium; Attendance: 2,056
Note: Charity match for the victims of the earthquake in Athens.

9 February 2000 Friendly	AEK Athens	6–2	Chaidari	Thrakomakedones
15:00 EET (UTC+2)	Kasapis 17'; Konstantinidis 59'; Ćirić 60', 62' (pen.); Anastasakos 65'; Platakis 67'	Report	Karagiannis 75'; Pirenis 77'	Stadium: AEK Athens' Training Complex; Attendance: Behind closed doors

== Competitions ==
=== Overall record ===
Competition	First match	Last match	Starting round	Final position	Record							
Competition	First match	Last match	Starting round	Final position	Pld	W	D	L	GF	GA	GD	Win %
Alpha Ethniki	20 September 1999	27 May 2000	Matchday 1	3rd	34	20	6	8	69	39	+30	58.82
Greek Cup	7 August 1999	10 May 2000	Group stage	Winners	11	9	1	1	38	7	+31	81.82
UEFA Champions League	11 August 1999	15 August 1999	Third qualifying round	Third qualifying round	2	0	1	1	0	1	−1	0.00
UEFA Cup	12 September 2000	22 February 2001	First round	Third round	6	3	1	2	11	6	+5	50.00
Total					53	32	9	12	118	53	+65	60.38

Last updated: 27 May 2000
Source: Competitions

=== Alpha Ethniki ===
==== League table ====
Pos	Team	Pld	W	D	L	GF	GA	GD	Pts	Qualification or relegation
1	Olympiacos (C)	34	30	2	2	86	18	+68	92	Qualification for Champions League first group stage
2	Panathinaikos	34	28	4	2	92	24	+68	88	Qualification for Champions League third qualifying round
3	AEK Athens	34	20	6	8	69	39	+30	66	Qualification for UEFA Cup first round
4	OFI	34	18	9	7	60	44	+16	63	Qualification for UEFA Cup first round
5	PAOK	34	15	10	9	64	44	+20	55	Qualification for UEFA Cup first round

Source: Galanis Sports Data
Rules for classification: 1) Points; 2) Head-to-head points; 3) Head-to-head goal difference; 4) Goal difference; 5) Goals scored; 6) Goals against; 7) Play-offs (neutral ground); 8) Draw.
(Note: Criterion 7 is only used if needed to decide champion, teams for relegation or teams for UEFA competitions).
(C) Champions

==== Results summary ====
Overall								Home						Away					
Pld	W	D	L	GF	GA	GD	Pts	W	D	L	GF	GA	GD	W	D	L	GF	GA	GD
34	20	6	8	69	39	+30	66	13	0	4	41	16	+25	7	6	4	28	23	+5

Source: Competitive matches

==== Results by Matchday ====
Round	1	2	3	4	5	6	7	8	9	10	11	12	13	14	15	16	17	18	19	20	21	22	23	24	25	26	27	28	29	30	31	32	33	34
Ground	A	H	A	H	A	H	A	H	H	A	H	A	H	A	H	A	A	H	A	H	A	H	A	H	A	A	H	A	H	A	H	A	H	H
Result	D	L	W	W	W	L	D	W	L	D	W	W	L	L	W	W	D	W	L	W	L	W	L	W	D	W	W	D	W	W	W	W	W	W
Position	6	11	11	6	4	6	6	6	6	6	5	4	7	8	5	5	6	4	5	4	6	5	5	4	4	4	4	4	4	4	4	3	3	3

Source: Competitive matches
A = Away; H = Home; W = Win; D = Draw; L = Loss; P = Postponed

==== Matches ====
20 September 1999 1	PAOK	4–4	AEK Athens	Thessaloniki
19:15 EEST (UTC+3)	Michopoulos (yellow card) 1'; Marangos 16'; Frousos (yellow card) 19'; Dollberg 36', (yellow card) 50'; Georgiadis (yellow card) 41', (goal) 65'; Valencia 89'		Ćirić 2' (pen.); Zikos (yellow card) 13'; Nikolaidis 20'; Dollberg 23' (o.g.); Kasapis (yellow card) 29'; Bjeković (yellow card) 45' (yellow-red card) 52'; Dellas 46'	Stadium: Toumba Stadium; Attendance: 22,226; Referee: Giorgos Douros (Corinthia)

26 September 1999 2	AEK Athens	1–2	Panathinaikos	Piraeus
19:00 EEST (UTC+3)	Zikos (yellow card) 29', (goal) 45'; Dellas (yellow card) 72'; Matijašević (yellow card) 88'		Goumas (yellow card) 19'; Mykland (yellow card) 32'; Pflipsen 42'; Henriksen (yellow card) 44'; Asanović 78', (yellow card) 79'	Stadium: Karaiskakis Stadium; Attendance: 17,619; Referee: Panagiotis Nikou (Imathia)

3 October 1999 3	Ethnikos Asteras	1–3	AEK Athens	Kaisariani
17:00 EEST (UTC+3)	Lagos (yellow card) 33'; Tešović (yellow card) 61'; Triantafyllou (yellow card) 65'; Xanthis 90+8'		Dellas (yellow card) 27'; Savevski (yellow card) 60'; Zikos (yellow card) 70'; Ćirić 77'; Konstantinidis 80'; Markos 90+4'	Stadium: Michalis Kritikopoulos Stadium; Attendance: 3,950; Referee: Pavlos Konstantinidis (Piraeus)

17 October 1999 4	AEK Athens	3–2	Iraklis	Nea Smyrni
18:00 EEST (UTC+3)	Ćirić 38', 45+3' (pen.), 90+1' (pen.); Atmatsidis (yellow card) 42'; Maladenis (yellow card) 45+4'; Dellas (yellow card) 49'		Konstantinou 3'; Sebwe 15'; Tavlaridis (yellow card) 18' (yellow-red card) 45+2'; Velis (yellow card) 27'; Dilberis (yellow card) 82'; Berneanou (yellow card) 90'; Tziortziopoulos (yellow card) 90+2'	Stadium: Nea Smyrni Stadium; Attendance: 7,712; Referee: Pavlos Papilias (Piraeus)

25 October 1999 5	Paniliakos	0–1	AEK Athens	Pyrgos
18:15 EEST (UTC+3)	Tasiopoulos (yellow card); Gonias (yellow card)		Bjeković 77', (yellow card)	Stadium: Pyrgos Stadium; Attendance: 4,887; Referee: Kostas Vallianos (Aetoloacarnania)

15 November 1999 6	AEK Athens	0–2	Olympiacos	Nea Filadelfeia
15:00 EET (UTC+2)	Maladenis (yellow card) 8'; Kalitzakis (yellow card) 56' (yellow-red card) 64'; Kasapis (yellow card) 58'; Atmatsidis (yellow card) 65'; Dellas (yellow card) 73'		Giovanni (yellow card) 9', (goal) 90+2'; Đorđević (yellow card) 50', (goal) 74' (pen.)	Stadium: Nikos Goumas Stadium; Attendance: Behind closed doors Referee: Vangelis Dimitropoulos (Patras)
Note: The match was postponed due to obligations of both teams in the European competitions.

6 November 1999 7	Ionikos	1–1	AEK Athens	Piraeus
17:00 EET (UTC+2)	Brewster (yellow card) 31'; Gyrichidis (yellow card) 45'; Pachatouridis (yellow card) 45+3'; Rodriguez (yellow card) 51'; Afash 58'; Udebuluzor (yellow card) 76'		Bjeković (yellow card) 17'; Xanthopoulos 39' (o.g.); Kasapis (yellow card) 57'; Zikos (yellow card) 76'	Stadium: Karaiskakis Stadium; Attendance: 6,429; Referee: Malamas Tevekelis (Thessaloniki)
Note: Ionikos played at Karaiskakis Stadium due to security requirements and higher ticket capacity compared to Neapoli Stadium.

20 November 1999 8	AEK Athens	2–0	Aris	Nea Filadelfeia
18:30 EET (UTC+2)	Kapsis 14'; Bjeković (yellow card) 28'; Nikolaidis 63'; Markos (yellow card) 67'; Petrić (yellow card) 71'; Konstantinidis (yellow card) 90+3'		Koutsis (yellow card) 2'	Stadium: Nikos Goumas Stadium; Attendance: 4,207; Referee: Giorgos Borovilos (Arcadia)

28 November 1999 9	AEK Athens	1–2	OFI	Rhodes
16:30 EET (UTC+2)	Bjeković (yellow card) 25'; Petrić (yellow card) 44'; Kopitsis (yellow card) 61'; Konstantinidis 90+1'		Kolitsidakis (yellow card) 8'; Gómez 45', 57', (yellow card) 72'; Stavrakakis (yellow card) 46'; Digozis (yellow card) 90+3'	Stadium: Diagoras Stadium; Attendance: 4,587; Referee: Giorgos Bikas (Chalkidiki)
Note: The match was held in Rhodes because AEK were punished with two matches away from home for fan invasion during the match against Olympiacos for the Cup.

5 December 1999 10	Skoda Xanthi	2–2	AEK Athens	Xanthi
16:15 EET (UTC+2)	Zouboulis 20', 43'; Prittas (yellow card) 30'; Kechagias (yellow card) 65'		Konstantinidis (yellow card) 35', (goal) 83'; Maladenis (yellow card) 40'; Markos 67'; Ćirić (yellow card) 90+1'	Stadium: A.O. Xanthi Stadium; Attendance: 2,767; Referee: Manolis Giannadakis (Lasithi)

13 December 1999 11	AEK Athens	3–0	Panachaiki	Rhodes
15:00 EET (UTC+2)	Kapsis 1'; Nikolaidis 25', 58'		Copertino (yellow card) 42'; Iakovou (yellow card) 79'	Stadium: Diagoras Stadium; Attendance: 2,313; Referee: Christos Daglis (Thessaloniki)
Note: The match was held in Rhodes because AEK were punished with two matches away from home for fan invasion during the match against Olympiacos for the Cup.

22 December 1999 12	Proodeftiki	1–4	AEK Athens	Nikaia
15:00 EET (UTC+2)	Pantelidis (yellow card) 24'; Angelopoulos (yellow card) 58'; Bayazid (penalty missed) 86'; Kazantzis 88'; Andralas (yellow card) 90+2'		Nikolaidis 39', (yellow card) 45+1'; Bjeković 45+2', 61'; Ćirić 65'; Atmatsidis (yellow card) 85'	Stadium: Nikaia Municipal Stadium; Attendance: 1,410; Referee: Spyros Pougakiotis (Phthiotis)

29 December 1999 13	AEK Athens	0–1	Panionios	Nea Filadelfeia
15:00 EET (UTC+2)	Nikolaidis (yellow card) 12'		Chasiotis (yellow card) 19'; Maqueda (yellow card) 63'; Sakellaridis (yellow card) 74'; Nalitzis 84'	Stadium: Nikos Goumas Stadium; Attendance: 4,653; Referee: Nikos Angelakis (Thessaloniki)

8 January 2000 14	Apollon Smyrnis	3–2	AEK Athens	Piraeus
16:30 EET (UTC+2)	Vourexakis (yellow card) 8' (yellow-red card) 39'; Papadimitriou (yellow card) 9'; Labriakos 26', (yellow card) 47', (penalty missed) 47'; Karanikolas 63', (yellow card) 83'; Roussos (yellow card) 68'; Z. Ćirić (yellow card) 30' (yellow-red card) 90+4', (goal) 90+4'		Bjeković 48', (yellow card) 84'; Zikos (yellow card) 59' (yellow-red card) 66'; Kalitzakis 90+1'	Stadium: Karaiskakis Stadium; Attendance: 1,827; Referee: Panagiotis Nikou (Imathia)

16 January 2000 15	AEK Athens	3–0	Kavala	Nea Filadelfeia
15:00 EET (UTC+2)	Maladenis 53', 73', 88'; Zikos (yellow card) 67'; Nikolaidis (yellow card) 73'		Pisz (yellow card) 48'; Kefalas (yellow card) 48'; Udeze (yellow card) 76'	Stadium: Nikos Goumas Stadium; Attendance: 4,326; Referee: Pavlos Konstantinidis (Piraeus)

23 January 2000 16	Trikala	0–1	AEK Athens	Trikala
17:00 EET (UTC+2)	Prekates (yellow card) 56'; Angelopoulos (yellow card) 84'; Kottaras (yellow card) 87'; Caprile (yellow card) 90'		Maladenis (yellow card) 36'; Konstantinidis (yellow card) 36'; Karagiannis (yellow card) 65'; Ćirić 87' (pen.); Kopitsis (yellow card) 90+1'	Stadium: Trikala Municipal Stadium; Attendance: 2,826; Referee: Panagiotis Nikou (Imathia)

31 January 2000 17	Kalamata	1–1	AEK Athens	Kalamata
15:00 EET (UTC+2)	Tzanetis (yellow card); Georgeas (yellow card); Bachramis 61', (yellow card)		Petkov (yellow card); Grétarsson (yellow card); Maladenis 50'; Kapsis (yellow card) 68'	Stadium: Messiniakos Stadium; Attendance: 3,211; Referee: Spyros Papadakos (Laconia)

5 February 2000 18	AEK Athens	2–0	PAOK	Nea Filadelfeia
17:00 EET (UTC+2)	Bjeković (yellow card) 27'; Dellas (yellow card) 28'; Nikolaidis 50', 84', (yellow card) 58'; Karagiannis (yellow card) 75'		Chasiotis (yellow card) 14'; P. Konstantinidis (yellow card) 22'; Amponsah (yellow card) 63'	Stadium: Nikos Goumas Stadium; Attendance: 10,082; Referee: Manolis Giannadakis (Lasithi)

13 February 2000 19	Panathinaikos	1–0	AEK Athens	Marousi
19:00 EET (UTC+2)	Mykland (yellow card) 76'; Asanović (yellow card) 85'; Kola 90+2'		Karagiannis (yellow card) 19'; Petkov (yellow card) 60'	Stadium: Olympic Stadium; Attendance: 23,880; Referee: Georgios Psychomanis (Athens)

20 February 2000 20	AEK Athens	2–1	Ethnikos Asteras	Nea Filadelfeia
15:00 EET (UTC+2)	Bjeković 30'; Ćirić 54' (pen.), (yellow card) 88'; Petkov (yellow card) 70'; Atmatsidis (yellow card) 85'; Dellas (yellow card) 90+1'		Milovanović 16'; Basinas (yellow card) 26'; Lagos (yellow card) 45+1' (yellow-red card) 53'	Stadium: Nikos Goumas Stadium; Attendance: 3,534; Referee: Filippos Dobas (Athens)

27 February 2000 21	Iraklis	3–1	AEK Athens	Thessaloniki
17:00 EET (UTC+2)	Stoltidis (yellow card) 18'; Xenidis 33', (yellow card) 61'; Konstantinou 41', 74' (pen.); Amankwah (yellow card) 50'; Bekiaris (yellow card) 83'		Savevski 7'; Kalitzakis (yellow card) 10'; Karagiannis (yellow card) 64'; Kostenoglou (yellow card) 73'	Stadium: Kaftanzoglio Stadium; Attendance: 9,575; Referee: Giorgos Borovilos (Arcadia)

5 March 2000 22	AEK Athens	1–0	Paniliakos	Nea Filadelfeia
16:00 EET (UTC+2)	Kapsis (yellow card) 52'; Ćirić 87'		Nousias (yellow card) 15'; Ferekidis (yellow card) 41'; Nebegleras (yellow card) 72'; Rosales (yellow card) 89'	Stadium: Nikos Goumas Stadium; Attendance: 3,689; Referee: Pavlos Papilias (Piraeus)

12 March 2000 23	Olympiacos	3–0	AEK Athens	Marousi
17:45 EET (UTC+2)	Eleftheropoulos (yellow card) 39'; Đorđević 44' (pen.), 81' (pen.); Zahovič 64'; Passalis (yellow card) 79'		Dellas (yellow card) 36'; Kostenoglou (yellow card) 45' (yellow-red card) 82'	Stadium: Olympic Stadium; Attendance: 14,121; Referee: Nikos Angelakis (Thessaloniki)

19 March 2000 24	AEK Athens	5–1	Ionikos	Nea Filadelfeia
16:00 EET (UTC+2)	Konstantinidis 1'; Nikolaidis 20', 25', 69', 75'		Brewster (yellow card) 14'; Gyrichidis (yellow card) 29'; Roberts 89'	Stadium: Nikos Goumas Stadium; Attendance: 2,511; Referee: Dimitris Kalyvas (Boeotia)

25 March 2000 25	Aris	1–1	AEK Athens	Thessaloniki
17:00 EET (UTC+2)	Mallous (yellow card) 18'; Charisteas (yellow card) 64'; Katsiaros (yellow card) 74'; Koltsidas (yellow card) 78'; Papadopoulos 79' (pen.)		Karagiannis (yellow card) 22'; Kalitzakis (yellow card) 45'; Nikolaidis 51'	Stadium: Aris Stadium; Attendance: 8,941; Referee: Dimitris Kalyvas (Boeotia)

1 April 2000 26	OFI	1–2	AEK Athens	Heraklion
17:00 EEST (UTC+3)	Adamos (yellow card) 20'; Digozis 29'; Nioplias (yellow card) 87'		Ćirić (penalty missed) 21', (yellow card) 67'; Lakis 23'; Petkov (yellow card) 33', (goal) 48'; Kostenoglou (yellow card) 72'	Stadium: Theodoros Vardinogiannis Stadium; Attendance: 4,448; Referee: Nikos Angelakis (Thessaloniki)

12 April 2000 27	AEK Athens	4–1	Skoda Xanthi	Nea Filadelfeia
16:30 EEST (UTC+3)	Nikolaidis 19', 45'; Maladenis 83', 90'		Zapropoulos (yellow card) 31'; Zouboulis 38'; Chavos (yellow card) 47'	Stadium: Nikos Goumas Stadium; Attendance: 3,028; Referee: Paraskevas Chelis (Kavala)

16 April 2000 28	Panachaiki	1–1	AEK Athens	Patras
17:00 EEST (UTC+3)	Epalle (yellow card) 54'; Miñarro (yellow card) 65'; Katsouranis 90'		Zikos (yellow card) 45'; Kostenoglou (yellow card) 60'; Konstantinidis 87'	Stadium: Kostas Davourlis Stadium; Attendance: 4,220; Referee: Panagiotis Nikou (Imathia)

23 April 2000 29	AEK Athens	3–2	Proodeftiki	Nea Filadelfeia
17:00 EEST (UTC+3)	Petkov 36'; Kasapis (yellow card) 38'; Lakis 43'; Nikolaidis 64' (pen.)		Kazantzis 60'; Fountoulakis (yellow card) 61'; Togias 68'; Angelopoulos (yellow card) 81'; Kurdughli (yellow card) 90+2'	Stadium: Nikos Goumas Stadium; Attendance: 3,371; Referee: Christos Daglis (Thessaloniki)

3 May 2000 30	Panionios	0–2	AEK Athens	Nea Smyrni
19:00 EEST (UTC+3)	Maqueda (yellow card) 70' (yellow-red card) 90+3'		Petkov (yellow card) 14'; Nikolaidis 22', 35'; Zikos (yellow card) 31'; Dellas (yellow card) 45+1'; Maladenis (yellow card) 83'	Stadium: Nea Smyrni Stadium; Attendance: 1,449; Referee: Giorgos Douros (Corinthia)

7 May 2000 31	AEK Athens	3–0	Apollon Smyrnis	Nea Filadelfeia
20:00 EEST (UTC+3)	Savevski (yellow card) 8'; Lakis (yellow card) 59', (goal) 89'; Nikolaidis 65' (pen.); Ćirić 90+1'		Vourexakis (yellow card) 50'; Belajić (yellow card) 85'	Stadium: Nikos Goumas Stadium; Attendance: 2,435; Referee: Makis Efthimiadis (Drama)

14 May 2000 32	Kavala	0–2	AEK Athens	Kavala
17:30 EEST (UTC+3)	Manalis (yellow card) 25'		Nikolaidis 56', 78', (yellow card) 66'; Konstantinidis (yellow card) 73'	Stadium: Kavala Municipal Stadium; Attendance: 2,115; Referee: Nikos Angelakis (Thessaloniki)

21 May 2000 33	AEK Athens	2–1	Trikala	Nea Filadelfeia
21:00 EEST (UTC+3)	Savevski 22'; Kasapis (yellow card) 30'; Dellas 44'		Caprile 45+1'	Stadium: Nikos Goumas Stadium; Attendance: 2,361; Referee: Thanasis Briakos (Epirus)

27 May 2000 34	AEK Athens	6–1	Kalamata	Nea Filadelfeia
20:00 EEST (UTC+3)	Nikolaidis 17' (pen.), 53' (pen.); Kasapis 35'; Zikos (yellow card) 39'; Konstantinidis 42'; Dellas 44'; Bjeković 77'		Kalantzis (yellow card) 10'; Kelpekis (yellow card) 17'; Georgeas (yellow card) 40'; Koutsoures 77'	Stadium: Nikos Goumas Stadium; Attendance: 2,925; Referee: Christos Daglis (Thessaloniki)

=== Greek Cup ===
==== Group 8 ====
Pos	Team	Pld	W	D	L	GF	GA	GD	Pts	Qualification	AEK	TRI	EGA	ATH	AKR	KAR
1	AEK Athens	5	5	0	0	20	3	+17	15	Round of 16		—	6–1	3–0	3–0	—
2	Trikala	5	4	0	1	9	5	+4	12	Round of 16	1–2		1–0	—	—	2–0
3	Egaleo	5	2	0	3	8	10	−2	6		—	—		—	4–1	2–0
4	Athinaikos	5	1	2	2	6	9	−3	5		—	2–3	2–1		—	—
5	Akratitos	5	1	1	3	5	11	−6	4		—	1–2	—	1–1		—
6	A.O.Karditsa	5	0	1	4	3	13	−10	1		1–6	—	—	1–1	1–2	

Source: epo.gr

==== Matches ====
7 August 1999 1	AEK Athens	6–1	Egaleo	Nea Filadelfeia
19:45 EEST (UTC+3)	Bjeković 20'; Ćirić 22', 58' (pen.), 75'; Nikolaidis 46'; Markos 90'	Report (page 24)	Makris 55'; Kogioglou (yellow card) 57'	Stadium: Nikos Goumas Stadium; Attendance: 2,797; Referee: Giorgos Fasolis (Athens)

21 August 1999 2	A.O. Karditsa	1–6	AEK Athens	Karditsa
13:00 EEST (UTC+3)	Letsios 76'	Report (page 24)	Zikos (yellow card); Lakis (yellow card); Petrić 15'; Markos 24'; Bountolos 37' (o.g.); Bjeković 41'; Ćirić 78', 87'	Stadium: Municipal Stadium of Karditsa; Referee: Paraskevas Chelis (Kavala)

27 October 1999 3	Trikala	1–2	AEK Athens	Trikala
18:15 EEST (UTC+3)	Angelopoulos (yellow card); Spyrakos (yellow card); Prekates (yellow card) (yellow-red card) 82'; Papasteriadis 32'	Report (page 25)	Kavazis (yellow card); Konstantinidis (yellow card); Vaios Karagiannis (yellow card); Kopitsis 84' (pen.); Markos 89'	Stadium: Trikala Municipal Stadium; Attendance: 1,877; Referee: Dimitris Pontikis (Thessaloniki)

29 August 1999 4	AEK Athens	3–0	Athinaikos	Nea Filadelfeia
20:00 EEST (UTC+3)	Nikolaidis 5', 30'; Kasapis (yellow card) 30'; Konstantinidis 57'; Ćirić (yellow card) 87'	Report (page 26)	Konstantinidis (yellow card) 17'; Veletakos (yellow card) 45'	Stadium: Nikos Goumas Stadium; Attendance: 1,709; Referee: Giorgos Douros (Corinthia)

13 October 1999 5	AEK Athens	3–0	Akratitos	Piraeus
20:00 EEST (UTC+3)	Katsavos (yellow card); Konstantinidis 40'; Lakis 60'; Maladenis 79'	Report (page 26)	Stoilov (yellow card); Pavlidis (yellow card)	Stadium: Karaiskakis Stadium; Attendance: 364; Referee: Kostas Finokaliotis (Athens)

===== Round of 16 =====
12 January 2000 Round of 16	AEK Athens	6–0	Trikala	Nea Filadelfeia
16:30 EET (UTC+2)	Vaios Karagiannis (yellow card); Maladenis 13', 24'; Nikolaidis 19', 82', 89'; Markos 21'	Report (page 31)	Ganas (yellow card); Ferreira (yellow card)	Stadium: Nikos Goumas Stadium; Attendance: 1,400; Referee: Dimitris Kalyvas (Boeotia)

===== Quarter-finals =====
6 February 2000 First leg	Olympiacos	1–1	AEK Athens	Marousi
18:30 EET (UTC+2)	Alexandris 75'; Kostoulas (yellow card) 78'	Report (page 33)	Petkov (yellow card) 29'; Lakis 32', (yellow card) 89'; Vaios Karagiannis (yellow card) 55'; Kopitsis (yellow card) 59'; Savevski (yellow card) 70'; Kostenoglou (yellow card) 29'	Stadium: Olympic Stadium; Referee: Dimitris Kalyvas (Boeotia)

8 March 2000 Second leg	AEK Athens	3–0 (4–1 agg.)	Olympiacos	Nea Filadelfeia
18:30 EET (UTC+2)	Nikolaidis 27', (yellow card) 27'; Kopitsis 31', (yellow card) 68'; Zikos (yellow card) 33'; Petkov 48'	Report (page 34)	Passalis (yellow card); Anatolakis (yellow card) 41'; Amanatidis (yellow card) 45+2'	Stadium: Nikos Goumas Stadium; Attendance: 14,400; Referee: Kyros Vassaras (Thessaloniki)

===== Semi-finals =====
5 April 2000 First leg	AEK Athens	4–1	Panionios	Nea Filadelfeia
19:30 EEST (UTC+3)	Konstantinidis (yellow card); Dellas (yellow card); Nikolaidis 24' (pen.), 45', 53'; Lakis 35'	Report (page 34)	Karaisaridis (yellow card); Kafalis (yellow card); Kljajević (yellow card); Gogolos (yellow card); Sapountzis 87' (pen.)	Stadium: Nikos Goumas Stadium; Attendance: 7,976; Referee: Giorgos Fasolis (Athens)

19 April 2000 Second leg	Panionios	2–1 (3–5 agg.)	AEK Athens	Nea Smyrni
19:30 EEST (UTC+3)	Karaisaridis (yellow card); Kientz (yellow card); Kafalis 74'; Krčmarević 90'	Report (page 35)	Kapsis (yellow card); Markos (yellow card); Ćirić 22'	Stadium: Nea Smyrni Stadium; Referee: Giorgos Kasnaferis (Athens)

===== Final =====
10 May 2000 Final	AEK Athens	3–0	Ionikos	Marousi
20:00 EEST (UTC+3)	Zikos (yellow card) 26'; Nikolaidis (yellow card) 33', (goal) 37'; Petkov 76'; Maladenis 81'	Report (page 35)	Haugland (yellow card) 12'; Afash (yellow card) 32'; Kobayashi (yellow card) 34'; Xanthopoulos (yellow card) 65'; Ofrydopoulos (yellow card) 72'; Leopaldi (yellow card) 89'	Stadium: Olympic Stadium; Attendance: 25,471; Referee: Giorgos Douros (Corinthia)
Note: In the 32nd minute and while the score was 0–0, Nikolaidis scored with his hand. The referee didn't realize the violation and showed goal, but Nikolaidis approached him and explained what happened. As a result the referee changed his decision, canceling the goal, whistling handball and showed Nikolaidis a yellow card. Nikolaidis was later honored by the International Olympic Committee for his fair play.

=== UEFA Champions League ===
==== Third qualifying round ====
The draw for the third qualifying round was held on 23 July 1999.

11 August 1999 First leg	AEK Athens (Greece)	0–0	(Sweden) AIK	Athens, Greece
21:15 EEST (UTC+3)	Kopitsis (yellow card) 35'; Kapsis (yellow card) 56'; Petrić (yellow card) 68'	Report	A. Andersson (yellow card) 8'; O. Andersson (yellow card) 62'; Nordin (yellow card) 69'; Gustafsson (yellow card) 74'	Stadium: Nikos Goumas Stadium; Attendance: 17,786; Referee: Juan Fernández Marin (Spain)

25 August 1999 Second leg	AIK (Sweden)	1−0 (1–0 agg.)	(Greece) AEK Athens	Solna, Sweden
20:00 EEST (UTC+3)	Novaković 57', (yellow card) 59'; Gustafsson (yellow card) 81'	Report	Ćirić (yellow card) 66'	Stadium: Råsunda Stadium; Attendance: 31,115; Referee: Graziano Cesari (Italy)

=== UEFA Cup ===
==== First round ====
16 September 1999 First leg	Torpedo Kutaisi (Georgia (country))	0–1	(Greece) AEK Athens	Kutaisi, Georgia
15:00 EEST (UTC+3)	Gogiashvili (yellow card) 15'; Chkhetiani (yellow card) 19'; Khvadagiani (yellow card) 56'	Report	Lakis (yellow card) 12'; Petrić (yellow card) 54'; Maladenis (yellow card) 65'; Bjeković (yellow card) 84'; Zikos 90+1'	Stadium: Ramaz Shengelia Stadium; Attendance: 10,000; Referee: John McDermott (Ireland)

30 September 1999 Second leg	AEK Athens (Greece)	6–1 (7–1 agg.)	(Georgia (country)) Torpedo Kutaisi	Athens, Greece
17:00 EEST (UTC+3)	Ćirić 8' (pen.); Bjeković 22', (yellow card) 49'; Maladenis 24'; Kopitsis 44', 88'; Nikolaidis 73'	Report	Megreladze 72'; Ionanidze (yellow card) 77'; Maglakelidze (yellow card) 87'	Stadium: Nea Smyrni Stadium; Attendance: 4,008; Referee: Miroslav Liba (Czech Republic)

==== Second round ====
21 October 1999 First leg	MTK Budapest (Hungary)	2–1	(Greece) AEK Athens	Budapest, Hungary
21:00 EEST (UTC+3)	Egressy 20'; Erős 34'; Madar (yellow card) 66'; Kovács (yellow card) 83'	Report	Ćirić 66'	Stadium: Hidegkuti Nándor Stadium; Attendance: 4,000; Referee: Dani Koren (Israel)

2 November 1999 Second leg	AEK Athens (Greece)	1–0 (2(a)–2 agg.)	(Hungary) MTK Budapest	Athens, Greece
18:00 EET (UTC+2)	Petrić (yellow card) 35'; Markos (yellow card) 40'; Ćirić 75' (pen.); Zikos (yellow card) 87'	Report	Fehér (yellow card) 28' (yellow-red card) 55'; Halmai (yellow card) 32' (red card) 60'; Kuttor (yellow card) 66'	Stadium: Nea Smyrni Stadium; Attendance: 7,288; Referee: Pascal Garibian (France)

==== Third round ====
23 November 1999 First leg	AEK Athens (Greece)	2–2	(France) Monaco	Athens, Greece
18:00 EET (UTC+2)	Nikolaidis (yellow card) 66', (goal) 45', 89'	Report	Giuly 26'; Gallardo (yellow card) 45'; Djetou (yellow card) 50'; Christanval (yellow card) 63'; Simone 78'; Lamouchi (yellow card) 84'	Stadium: Nikos Goumas Stadium; Attendance: 7,299; Referee: Claus Bo Larsen (Denmark)

9 December 1999 Second leg	Monaco (France)	1–0 (3–2 agg.)	(Greece) AEK Athens	Fontvieille, Monaco
20:30 EET (UTC+2)	Sagnol (yellow card) 24'; Simone 31'; Márquez (yellow card) 33'; Sylva (yellow card) 78'	Report	Grétarsson (yellow card) 42'; Kasapis (yellow card) 61'; Zikos (yellow card) 68'	Stadium: Stade Louis II; Attendance: 5,000; Referee: Dieter Schoch (Switzerland)

== Statistics ==
=== Squad statistics ===
As of 27 May 2000

No.	Pos	Player	Alpha Ethniki		Greek Cup		Champions League		UEFA Cup		Total	
No.	Pos	Player	Apps	Goals	Apps	Goals	Apps	Goals	Apps	Goals	Apps	Goals
Goalkeepers
1	GK	(Greece) Ilias Atmatsidis	33	0	9	0	2	0	6	0	50	0
15	GK	(Greece) Chrysostomos Michailidis	1	0	2	0	0	0	0	0	3	0
22	GK	(Greece) Lefteris Petkaris	0	0	0	0	0	0	0	0	0	0
Defenders
2	DF	(Greece) Traianos Dellas	21	3	7	0	1	0	4	0	33	3
5	DF	(Greece) Nikos Kostenoglou	20	0	7	0	0	0	2	0	29	0
12	DF	(Greece) Charis Kopitsis	28	0	7	2	1	0	4	2	40	4
17	DF	(Greece) Michalis Kasapis	13	1	5	0	1	0	5	0	24	1
21	DF	(Greece) Vaios Karagiannis	12	0	5	0	0	0	0	0	17	0
25	DF	(Greece) Giannis Kalitzakis	23	1	7	0	0	0	3	0	33	1
27	DF	(Italy) Filippo Dal Moro	0	0	0	0	0	0	0	0	0	0
29	DF	(Italy) Davide Belotti	1	0	0	0	0	0	0	0	1	0
32	DF	(Greece) Michalis Kapsis	26	2	10	0	1	0	2	0	39	2
—	DF	(Greece) Georgios Paraskevaidis	0	0	0	0	0	0	0	0	0	0
Midfielders
6	MF	(Greece) Dimitris Markos	29	2	9	4	2	0	5	0	45	6
7	MF	(Greece) Christos Maladenis	23	6	9	4	2	0	4	1	38	11
8	MF	(North Macedonia) Toni Savevski	31	2	10	0	2	0	4	0	47	2
10	MF	(Federal Republic of Yugoslavia) Dragan Ćirić	26	10	10	6	2	0	6	3	44	19
14	MF	(Greece) Akis Zikos	27	1	7	0	2	0	6	1	42	2
16	MF	(Iceland) Arnar Grétarsson	14	0	5	0	0	0	3	0	22	0
18	MF	(Greece) Evripidis Katsavos	10	0	4	0	0	0	1	0	15	0
23	MF	(Greece) Vasilios Lakis	17	3	9	3	2	0	3	0	31	6
24	MF	(Federal Republic of Yugoslavia) Vladimir Matijašević	3	0	1	0	2	0	2	0	8	0
26	MF	(Greece) Giorgos Passios	5	0	1	0	0	0	0	0	6	0
28	MF	(Bulgaria) Milen Petkov	15	2	5	2	0	0	0	0	20	4
30	MF	(Argentina) Pablo Cantero	1	0	0	0	0	0	0	0	1	0
—	MF	(Greece) Mattheos Platakis	0	0	0	0	0	0	0	0	0	0
Forwards
9	FW	(Federal Republic of Yugoslavia) Nenad Bjeković	20	6	4	2	1	0	6	1	31	9
11	FW	(Greece) Demis Nikolaidis	32	22	8	11	2	0	6	3	48	36
19	FW	(Cyprus) Giorgos Kavazis	3	0	1	0	0	0	0	0	4	0
20	FW	(Greece) Sotiris Konstantinidis	24	6	7	2	2	0	4	0	37	8
31	FW	(Greece) Ilias Anastasakos	1	0	0	0	0	0	0	0	1	0
Left during Winter Transfer Window
3	DF	(Federal Republic of Yugoslavia) Gordan Petrić	7	0	4	1	2	0	3	0	16	1

=== Goalscorers ===
As of 27 May 2000
The list is sorted by competition order when total goals are equal, then by position and then by squad number.

Rank	No.	Pos.	Player	Alpha Ethniki	Greek Cup	Champions League	UEFA Cup	Total
1	11	FW	(Greece) Demis Nikolaidis	22	11	0	3	36
2	10	MF	(Federal Republic of Yugoslavia) Dragan Ćirić	10	6	0	3	19
3	7	MF	(Greece) Christos Maladenis	6	4	0	1	11
4	9	FW	(Federal Republic of Yugoslavia) Nenad Bjeković	6	2	0	1	9
5	20	FW	(Greece) Sotiris Konstantinidis	6	2	0	0	8
6	23	MF	(Greece) Vasilios Lakis	3	3	0	0	6
6	6	MF	(Greece) Dimitris Markos	2	4	0	0	6
8	28	MF	(Bulgaria) Milen Petkov	2	2	0	0	4
8	12	DF	(Greece) Charis Kopitsis	0	2	0	2	4
10	2	DF	(Greece) Traianos Dellas	3	0	0	0	3
11	32	DF	(Greece) Michalis Kapsis	2	0	0	0	2
11	8	MF	(North Macedonia) Toni Savevski	2	0	0	0	2
11	14	MF	(Greece) Akis Zikos	1	0	0	1	2
14	25	DF	(Greece) Giannis Kalitzakis	1	0	0	0	1
14	17	DF	(Greece) Michalis Kasapis	1	0	0	0	1
14	3	DF	(Federal Republic of Yugoslavia) Gordan Petrić	0	0	0	1	1
Own goals				2	1	0	0	3
Totals				69	38	0	11	118

=== Hat-tricks ===
Numbers in superscript represent the goals that the player scored.

Player	Against	Result	Date	Competition	Source
(Federal Republic of Yugoslavia) Dragan Ćirić	(Greece) Egaleo	6–1 (H)	7 August 1999	Greek Cup	
(Federal Republic of Yugoslavia) Dragan Ćirić	(Greece) Iraklis	3–2 (H)	17 October 1999	Alpha Ethniki	
(Greece) Demis Nikolaidis	(Greece) Trikala	6–0 (H)	12 January 2000	Greek Cup	
(Greece) Christos Maladenis	(Greece) Kavala	3–0 (H)	16 January 2000	Alpha Ethniki	
(Greece) Demis Nikolaidis^{4}	(Greece) Ionikos	5–1 (H)	19 March 2000	Alpha Ethniki	
(Greece) Demis Nikolaidis	(Greece) Panionios	4–1 (H)	5 April 2000	Greek Cup	

=== Assist ===
As of 27 May 2000
The list is sorted by competition order when total assists are equal, then by position and then by squad number.

Rank	No.	Pos.	Player	Alpha Ethniki	Greek Cup	Champions League	UEFA Cup	Total
1	20	FW	(Greece) Sotiris Konstantinidis	6	2	0	1	9
1	11	FW	(Greece) Demis Nikolaidis	5	4	0	0	9
1	10	MF	(Federal Republic of Yugoslavia) Dragan Ćirić	2	5	0	2	9
4	6	MF	(Greece) Dimitris Markos	7	1	0	0	8
5	8	MF	(North Macedonia) Toni Savevski	2	3	1	0	6
6	9	FW	(Federal Republic of Yugoslavia) Nenad Bjeković	3	2	0	0	5
6	12	DF	(Greece) Charis Kopitsis	2	3	0	0	5
8	14	MF	(Greece) Akis Zikos	4	0	0	0	4
8	28	MF	(Bulgaria) Milen Petkov	4	0	0	0	4
8	2	DF	(Greece) Traianos Dellas	3	1	0	0	4
8	23	MF	(Greece) Vasilios Lakis	2	2	0	0	4
12	7	MF	(Greece) Christos Maladenis	2	1	0	0	3
13	17	DF	(Greece) Michalis Kasapis	0	1	0	1	2
14	3	DF	(Federal Republic of Yugoslavia) Gordan Petrić	1	0	0	0	1
14	5	DF	(Greece) Nikos Kostenoglou	1	0	0	0	1
14	26	MF	(Greece) Giorgos Passios	0	1	0	0	1
14	16	MF	(Iceland) Arnar Grétarsson	0	1	0	0	1
14	18	MF	(Greece) Evripidis Katsavos	0	1	0	0	1
Totals				44	28	1	4	77

=== Clean sheets ===
As of 27 May 2000
The list is sorted by competition order when total clean sheets are equal and then by squad number. Clean sheets in games where both goalkeepers participated are awarded to the goalkeeper who started the game. Goalkeepers with no appearances are not included.

Rank	No.	Player	Alpha Ethniki	Greek Cup	Champions League	UEFA Cup	Total
1	1	(Greece) Ilias Atmatsidis	10	4	1	2	17
2	15	(Greece) Chrysostomos Michailidis	0	1	0	0	1
Totals			10	5	1	2	18

=== Disciplinary record ===
As of 27 May 2000

N	P	Nat.	Name	Alpha Ethniki			Greek Cup			Champions League			UEFA Cup			Total			Notes
N	P	Nat.	Name	Yellow card	Second yellow card	Red card	Yellow card	Second yellow card	Red card	Yellow card	Second yellow card	Red card	Yellow card	Second yellow card	Red card	Yellow card	Second yellow card	Red card	Notes
Goalkeepers
1	GK	(Greece)	Ilias Atmatsidis	4												4			
15	GK	(Greece)	Chrysostomos Michailidis																
22	GK	(Greece)	Lefteris Petkaris																
Defenders
2	DF	(Greece)	Traianos Dellas	9			1									10			
5	DF	(Greece)	Nikos Kostenoglou	4	1		2									6	1		
12	DF	(Greece)	Charis Kopitsis	1			3			1						5			
17	DF	(Greece)	Michalis Kasapis	5			1									6			
21	DF	(Greece)	Vaios Karagiannis	6			3									9			
25	DF	(Greece)	Giannis Kalitzakis	3	1											3	1		
27	DF	(Italy)	Filippo Dal Moro																
29	DF	(Italy)	Davide Belotti																
32	DF	(Greece)	Michalis Kapsis	2			1			1						4			
—	DF	(Greece)	Georgios Paraskevaidis																
Midfielders
6	MF	(Greece)	Dimitris Markos	1			1						1			3			
7	MF	(Greece)	Christos Maladenis	5												5			
8	MF	(North Macedonia)	Toni Savevski	2			1									3			
10	MF	(Federal Republic of Yugoslavia)	Dragan Ćirić	3			1			1						5			
14	MF	(Greece)	Akis Zikos	9	1		3						1			13	1		
16	MF	(Iceland)	Arnar Grétarsson	1												1			
18	MF	(Greece)	Evripidis Katsavos				1									1			
23	MF	(Greece)	Vasilios Lakis	1			2						1			4			
24	MF	(Federal Republic of Yugoslavia)	Vladimir Matijašević	1												1			
26	MF	(Greece)	Giorgos Passios																
28	MF	(Bulgaria)	Milen Petkov	5			1									6			
30	MF	(Argentina)	Pablo Cantero																
—	MF	(Greece)	Mattheos Platakis																
Forwards
9	FW	(Federal Republic of Yugoslavia)	Nenad Bjeković	7	1											7	1		
11	FW	(Greece)	Demis Nikolaidis	5			2									7			
19	FW	(Cyprus)	Giorgos Kavazis				1									1			
20	FW	(Greece)	Sotiris Konstantinidis	4			2									6			
31	FW	(Greece)	Ilias Anastasakos																
Left during Winter Transfer window
3	DF	(Federal Republic of Yugoslavia)	Gordan Petrić	2						1			1			4			

=== Starting 11 ===
This section presents the most frequently used formation along with the players with the most starts across all competitions.

N.	Formation	Matchday(s)
20	4–2–3–1	2, 6, 15, 17, 21, 28–32
17	4–4–2 (D)	1, 3–5, 7–9, 11, 18, 19, 22
16	3–5–2	10, 12–14, 16, 20, 23–27, 33, 34

No.	Nat.	Player	Pos.
1	(Greece)	Ilias Atmatsidis (C)	GK
32	(Greece)	Michalis Kapsis	RCB
2	(Greece)	Traianos Dellas	LCB
5	(Greece)	Nikos Kostenoglou	RB
12	(Greece)	Charis Kopitsis	LB
14	(Greece)	Akis Zikos	DM
6	(Greece)	Dimitris Markos	CM
7	(Greece)	Christos Maladenis	RM
8	(North Macedonia)	Toni Savevski	LM
10	(Federal Republic of Yugoslavia)	Dragan Ćirić	AM
11	(Greece)	Demis Nikolaidis	CF

Last updated: 2000-05-27

== Awards ==
Player	Pos.	Award	Source
(Greece) Demis Nikolaidis	FW	Greek Cup Top Scorer	
