= 2000 Greek Football Cup final =

2000 Greek Cup final
- Event: 1999–2000 Greek Football Cup
AEK Athens	Ionikos
3	0
- Date: 10 May 2000
- Venue: Olympic Stadium, Marousi, Athens
- Man of the Match: Demis Nikolaidis (AEK Athens)
- Referee: Giorgos Douros (Corinthia)
- Attendance: 25,471

The 2000 Greek Cup final was the 56th final of the Greek Cup. The match took place on 10 May 2000 at the Olympic Stadium. The contesting teams were AEK Athens and Ionikos. It was AEK Athens' sixteenth Greek Cup final in their 76 years of existence and Ionikos' first-ever Greek Cup final of their 35-year history. A remarkable moment of the match was at 32nd minute while the score was 0–0, AEK Athens took the lead with Demis Nikolaidis scoring with his hand. The referee did not realize the violation and ran towards the center of the pitch, but the player approached him and told him that he should not count the goal, explaining what exactly had happened. As a result, the goal was canceled and Nikolaidis was shown a yellow card for handball. Nikolaidis was later honored for his fair play by the International Olympic Committee.

== Venue ==
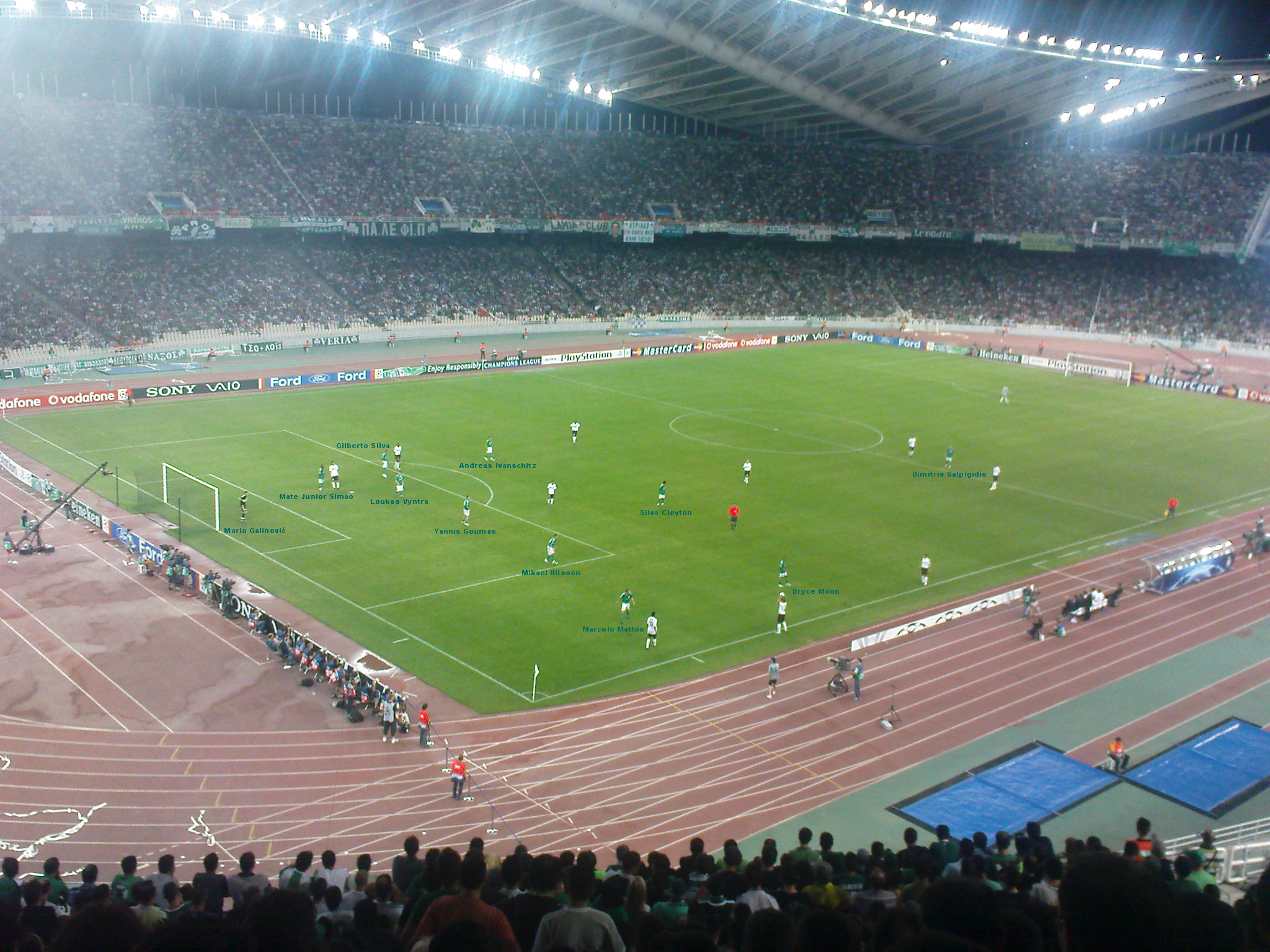
Athens Olympic Stadium.

This was the fourteenth Greek Cup final held at the Athens Olympic Stadium, after the 1983, 1984, 1985, 1986, 1987, 1988, 1989, 1990, 1993, 1994, 1995, 1996 and 1999 finals.

The Athens Olympic Stadium was built in 1982. The stadium is used as a venue for Olympiacos, Panathinaikos and Greece and was used for AEK Athens on various occasions. Its current capacity is 80,000 and hosted two European Cup/UEFA Champions League finals in 1983 and 1994, a UEFA Cup Winners' Cup final in 1987 and the 1991 Mediterranean Games.

== Background ==
AEK Athens had reached the Greek Cup final fifteen times, winning nine of them. The last time that they had played in a final was in 1997, where they had won against Panathinaikos by 5–3 on a penalty shootout, which came after a 0–0 draw at the end of the extra time.

Ionikos had never competed in a Cup final.

The two teams had never met each other in a Cup final.

== Route to the final ==
AEK Athens				Round	Ionikos			
Opponent	Result			Group stage	Opponent	Result		
Egaleo	6–1 (H)			Matchday 1	Panetolikos	3–0 (H)		
A.O. Karditsa	6–1 (A)			Matchday 2	Leonidio	2–1 (A)		
Trikala	2–1 (A)			Matchday 3	Panathinaikos	1–0 (A)		
Athinaikos	3–0 (H)			Matchday 4	Ialysos	6–0 (H)		
Akratitos	3–0 (H)			Matchday 5	Keratsini	3–2 (H)		
Group 8 winners: Pos / Team / Pld / Pts; 1 / AEK Athens / 5 / 15; 2 / Trikala / 5 / 12; 3 / Egaleo / 5 / 6; 4 / Athinaikos / 5 / 5; 5 / Akratitos / 5 / 4; 6 / A.O.Karditsa / 5 / 1; Source: epo.gr				Final standings	Group 1 runners-up: Pos / Team / Pld / Pts; 1 / Panathinaikos / 5 / 15; 2 / Ionikos / 5 / 9; 3 / Leonidio / 5 / 9; 4 / Panetolikos / 5 / 9; 5 / Keratsini / 5 / 3; 6 / Ialysos / 5 / 0; Source: epo.gr			
Opponent	Agg.	1st leg	2nd leg	Knockout phase	Opponent	Agg.	1st leg	2nd leg
Bye				Additional round	Marko	4–1 (H)		
Trikala	6–0 (H)			Round of 16	Iraklis	4–2 (H)		
Olympiacos	4–1	1–1 (A)	3–0 (H)	Quarter-finals	Nafpaktiakos Asteras	9–2	8–0 (H)	1–2 (A)
Panionios	5–3	4–1 (H)	1–2 (A)	Semi-finals	Kalamata	6–2	2–0 (A)	4–2 (H)

== Match ==
=== Details ===
10 May 2000
20:00 EEST

AEK Athens	3–0	Ionikos
Nikolaidis 37'; Petkov 76'; Maladenis 81'	Report (page 35)

Olympic Stadium, Marousi
Attendance: 25,471
Referee: Giorgos Douros (Corinthia)

AEK Athens	Ionikos

GK	1	(Greece) Ilias Atmatsidis (c)
CB	2	(Greece) Traianos Dellas
CB	32	(Greece) Michalis Kapsis
CB	25	(Greece) Giannis Kalitzakis		(substituted off) 85'
DM	14	(Greece) Akis Zikos	(yellow card) 25'
CM	28	(Bulgaria) Milen Petkov
RM	23	(Greece) Vasilios Lakis
LM	17	(Greece) Michalis Kasapis
AM	10	(Federal Republic of Yugoslavia) Dragan Ćirić		(substituted off) 70'
SS	20	(Greece) Sotiris Konstantinidis		(substituted off) 81'
CF	11	(Greece) Demis Nikolaidis	(yellow card) 35'
Substitutes:
GK	15	(Greece) Chrisostomos Michailidis
DF	12	(Greece) Charis Kopitsis
DF	21	(Greece) Vaios Karagiannis		(substituted on) 70'
MF	6	(Greece) Dimitris Markos
MF	7	(Greece) Christos Maladenis		(substituted on) 81'
MF	8	(North Macedonia) Toni Savevski		(substituted on) 85'
MF	18	(Greece) Evripidis Katsavos
Manager:
(Greece) Giannis Pathiakakis

GK	15	(Albania) Foto Strakosha
RB	3	(Greece) Theodoros Pachatouridis		(substituted off) 70'
CB	2	(Norway) Trond Inge Haugland	(yellow card) 11'
CB	5	(Greece) Giannis Xanthopoulos (c)	(yellow card) 65'
LB	7	(Greece) Georgios Daraklitsas
DM	21	(Greece) Dimitris Deligiannis
CM	8	(Syria) Mohammad Nasser Afash	(yellow card) 32'
CM	17	(Greece) Sokratis Ofrydopoulos	(yellow card) 70'	(substituted off) 75'
AM	10	(Brazil) Paulinho Kobayashi	(yellow card) 35'	(substituted off) 59'
CF	9	(Scotland) Craig Brewster
CF	23	(Liberia) Zizi Roberts
Substitutes:
GK	32	(Greece) Chrysostomos Veniamin
DF	12	(Greece) Apostolos Tsoptsis
DF	14	(Greece) Giannis Gyrichidis		(substituted on) 70'
MF	16	(Greece) Giorgos Staboulis
MF	20	(Peru) Martín Rodríguez
MF	37	(Argentina) Marcelo Leopaldi	(yellow card) 88'	(substituted on) 75'
FW	29	(Peru) Darío Muchotrigo		(substituted on) 59'
Manager:
(Ukraine) Oleg Blokhin

Man of the Match:
Demis Nikolaidis (AEK Athens)

Assistant referees:
Dimitris Groutsis (Corinthia)
Apostolos Kourkounas (Chania)

Match rules

- 90 minutes
- 30 minutes of extra time if necessary
- Penalty shootout if scores still level
- Seven named substitutes
- Maximum of three substitutions

== See also ==
- 1999–2000 Greek Football Cup
