= Iakovou =

Iakovou, or Iacovou, (Greek: Ιακώβου) is a surname of Greek-Cypriot origin, meaning "son of Jacob", that may refer to:

- Georgios Iacovou (born 1938), Cypriot diplomat and politician
- Hrisostomia Iakovou (born 1971), Greek distance runner at the 2000 Olympics
- Khristos Iakovou (born 1948), Greek weightlifter at the 1972 Olympics
- Lazaros Iakovou (born 1976), Cypriot footballer
