= 1999 Nova Supersports Cup =

Tournament details
- Host country: Greece
- Dates: 31 July to 1 August
- Teams: 4 (from 1 confederation)
- Venue: 1 (in 1 host city)

Final positions
- Champions: (Greece) AEK Athens (1st title)

Tournament statistics
- Matches played: 4
- Goals scored: 15 (3.75 per match)
- Attendance: 33.000 (8 per match)
- Top scorer(s): (Greece) Demis Nikolaidis (Federal Republic of Yugoslavia) Dragan Ćirić (Greece) Theodoros Zagorakis (2 goals)

The 1999 Nova Supersports Cup was an association football friendly tournament competition hosted by Greek premium sports network Nova Sports in 1999, held in Athens.

The tournament occurred from 31 July to 1 August 1999 with the participation of English Premier League club Leicester City, Hertha Berlin from the Bundesliga, Iraklis from the Alpha Ethniki and AEK Athens from the Alpha Ethniki, which eventually won the tournament.

== Teams ==
The teams who accepted the invitation are:

- (Greece) AEK Athens – Alpha Ethniki (host)
- (Greece) Iraklis – Alpha Ethniki
- (England) Leicester City – Premier League
- (Germany) Hertha Berlin – Bundesliga

Last updated: 6 December 2023.
Source: The Rec.Sport.Soccer Statistics Foundation

== Venue ==
All the games were played at the Nikos Goumas Stadium a 27,729-seat multi-use venue, home ground of hosts AEK Athens. The ground was demolished in June 2003.

== Matches ==
=== Semi-finals ===
31 July 1999
20:00 EET (UTC+2)

Iraklis (Greece)	0–1	(Germany) Hertha Berlin
		Rekdal 30' (pen.)

Nikos Goumas Stadium, Athens
Attendance: 8,000
Referee: Georgios Douros (Greece)
31 July 1999
22:00 EET (UTC+2)

AEK Athens (Greece)	3–2	(England) Leicester City
Ćirić 18'; Savevski 25'; Maladenis 44'	Report	Zagorakis 6' (pen.), 58'

Nikos Goumas Stadium, Athens
Attendance: 10,000
Referee: Georgios Psychomanis (Greece)

=== Match for third place ===
1 August 1999
20:00 EET (UTC+2)

Iraklis (Greece)	0–3	(England) Leicester City
	Report	Walsh 16'; Heskey 18'; Elliott 26'

Nikos Goumas Stadium, Athens
Referee: Georgios Kasnaferis (Greece)

=== Final ===
1 August 1999
22:00 EET (UTC+2)

AEK Athens (Greece)	4–2	(Germany) Hertha Berlin
Bjeković 44'; Nikolaidis 51', 66'; Ćirić 64' (pen.)	Report	Tretschok 15'; Neuendorf 50'

Nikos Goumas Stadium, Athens
Attendance: 15,000
Referee: Georgios Fasolis (Greece)

== Results ==
Year	Venue	Winner	Runners-up	3rd place	4th place
1999	Nikos Goumas Stadium	(Greece) AEK Athens	(Germany) Hertha Berlin	(England) Leicester City	(Greece) Iraklis

Last updated: 6 December 2023.
Source: The Rec.Sport.Soccer Statistics Foundation

== Scorers ==
Name	Club	Goals
(Greece) Demis Nikolaidis	AEK Athens	2
(Federal Republic of Yugoslavia) Dragan Ćirić	AEK Athens	2
(Greece) Theodoros Zagorakis	Leicester City	2
(North Macedonia) Toni Savevski	AEK Athens	1
(Greece) Christos Maladenis	AEK Athens	1
(Federal Republic of Yugoslavia) Nenad Bjeković	AEK Athens	1
(Germany) Andreas Neuendorf	Hertha Berlin	1
(Germany) René Tretschok	Hertha Berlin	1
(Norway) Kjetil Rekdal	Hertha Berlin	1
(England) Steve Walsh	Leicester City	1
(England) Matt Elliott	Leicester City	1
(England) Emile Heskey	Leicester City	1

Nova Supersports Cup
1999 Winners

AEK Athens
First Title

== Bibliography ==
- Συλλογικό έργο (2014). 90 ΧΡΟΝΙΑ, Η ΙΣΤΟΡΙΑ ΤΗΣ ΑΕΚ (in Greek). Αθήνα, Ελλάδα: Εκδοτικός Οίκος Α. Α. Λιβάνη. ISBN 978-960-14-2802-4.
- Παναγιωτακόπουλος, Παναγιώτης (2021). 1963-2021 Η ΕΥΡΩΠΑΪΚΗ ΙΣΤΟΡΙΑ ΤΗΣ Α.Ε.Κ. ΜΕΣΑ ΑΠΟ ΤΑ ΕΙΣΙΤΗΡΙΑ ΤΩΝ ΑΓΩΝΩΝ: το ταξίδι συνεχίζεται...!!! (in Greek). Αθήνα, Ελλάδα: ISBN 978-618-00-2832-4.
- Παναγιωτακόπουλος, Παναγιώτης (2022). 1979-2003 ΤΟ ΤΑΞΙΔΙ ΣΥΝΕΧΙΖΕΤΑΙ...Νο2: Οι επίσημοι αγώνες της Α.Ε.Κ. στο Ναό μέσα από τα εισιτήρια των αγώνων (in Greek). Αθήνα, Ελλάδα: ISBN 978-618-00-3993-1.
- Παναγιωτακόπουλος, Παναγιώτης (2023). 100 ΧΡΟΝΙΑ Α.Ε.Κ. - 100 ΣΤΙΓΜΕΣ ΔΟΞΑΣ μέσα από τα εισιτήρια των αγώνων: Το Ταξίδι Συνεχίζεται...!!! Νο3 (in Greek). Αθήνα, Ελλάδα: ISBN 978-618-00-4636-6.
