= Chasiotis =

Chasiotis is a surname. Notable people with the surname include:

- Stelios Chasiotis (born 1972), Greek footballer
- Dimitrios Chasiotis, Greek swimmer
- Dionysis Chasiotis (born in 1975), Greek footballer
