= Kazantzis =

Kazantzis is a Greek surname, from Turkish kazancı, "coppersmith". Notable people with the surname include:

- Georgios Kazantzis (born 1979), Greek footballer
- Judith Kazantzis (1940–2018), British poet
