= Giorgos Kavazis =

Cypriot footballer (born 1980)

Personal information
- Full name: Georgios Kavazis
- Date of birth: 15 January 1980 (age 46)
- Height: 1.83 m (6 ft 0 in)
- Position: Striker

Senior career*
Years	Team	Apps	(Gls)
1998–1999	Apollon Limassol		
1999–2000	AEK Athens	3	(0)
2000–2001	→ Kalamata (loan)	18	(1)
2001–2003	Apollon Limassol		
2003–2004	Ethnikos Asteras		
2004–2005	Agios Dimitrios		
2005–2006	AEL Limassol	4	(0)
2014–2015	Apollon Limassol		

International career
2001	Cyprus U21	1	(0)
- * Club domestic league appearances and goals

Giorgos Kavazis (Greek: Γιώργος Καβάζης; born 15 January 1980) is a retired Cypriot footballer who played as a striker.

== Club career ==
Kavazis began his career at Apollon Limassol in 1998. There he was spotted by AEK Athens, which resulted in his transfer to the Greek club on 5 February 1999 for a fee of 40 million drachmas. However Apollon appealed for the transfer, which resulted in the player not being able to compete with AEK until the summer 1999. He failed to establish himself in the squad, making only 3 appearances. At the end of the season he won the Cup. On 18 July 2000 he was loaned to Kalamata, but he did not manage to adapt there either. In the summer of 2001 he returned Apollon Limassol, where he stayed until the summer of 2003. Afterwards, he returned to Greece and playef for a season with Ethnikos Asteras and Agios Dimitrios. In 2005 he returned permanently to Cyprus on behalf of AEL Limassol. He continued to play football in lower-division clubs, such as PAEEK Kyrenia, Enosis Neon Parekklisia, AEZ Zakakiou. He finished his career in 2015 as a player of Apollon Limassol.

== Honours ==
AEK Athens

- Greek Cup: 1999–2000
