= Davide Belotti =

Italian footballer (born 1972)

Personal information
- Date of birth: 24 May 1972 (age 54)
- Place of birth: Bollate, Italy
- Height: 1.83 m (6 ft 0 in)
- Position: Defender

Team information
- Current team: Monza U19 (staff member)

Senior career*
Years	Team	Apps	(Gls)
1991–1992	Inter Milan	0	(0)
1992–1995	Nola	83	(2)
1995–1998	Vicenza	77	(0)
1998–1999	Treviso	13	(0)
1999–2002	Vicenza	6	(0)
2000	→ AEK Athens (loan)	1	(0)
2000–2001	→ Monza (loan)	19	(0)
2002–2003	Seregno	13	(0)
2003–2004	Lecco	28	(0)
2004–2008	Bellinzona	97	(1)
Total		277	(3)

Managerial career
- 2008–2010: Bellinzona (assistant)
- 2009: Bellinzona (caretaker)
- 2010–2012: Team Ticino U18 (assistant)
- 2013: GC Biaschesi
- 2014: Vllaznia (assistant)
- 2021–2022: Yverdon-Sport (assistant)
- * Club domestic league appearances and goals

Davide Belotti (born 24 May 1972) is an Italian football manager and former player who played as a defender.

== Club career ==
Belotti played for Italian clubs Inter Milan, Nola and Vicenza. Whilst at Vicenza he won the 1996–97 Coppa Italia. In 1998 he joined Treviso for a season before returining to Vicenza. On 31 January 2000 Belotti was loaned to the Greek side, AEK Athens for a fee of 30 million drachmas and a buy-out option. After his unsuccessful spell in Greece, he returned to Italy and was loaned at Monza for a season and then played for Seregno, Lecco and Bellinzona, where he retired in 2008.

== Managerial career ==
After the end of his career as a footballer, Belotti continued as an assistant manager at Bellinzona, where he stepped up as a caretaker in 2009. In 2010 he worked as an assistant manager on Team Ticino U18 for two years. In 2013 he became the manager of GC Biaschesi for two months. In 2014 he served as an assistant manager of Vllaznia for a year. In 2021 he assumed the position of the assistant manager at Yverdon-Sport for a season. From 2022 he works at the staff of Monza U19.

== Honours ==
Vicenza

- Coppa Italia: 1996–97
