= Ilias Triantafyllou =

Greek footballer

Personal information
- Date of birth: 14 August 1970 (age 56)
- Place of birth: Athens, Greece
- Height: 1.76 m (5 ft 9 in)
- Position: Defender

Senior career*
Years	Team	Apps	(Gls)
1986–1992	Ilisiakos		
1992–2002	Ethnikos Asteras		
2003	Marko		
- * Club domestic league appearances and goals

Ilias Triantafyllou (Greek: Ηλίας Τριανταφύλλου; born 14 August 1970) is a retired Greek football defender.
