= Pablo Cantero =

Argentinian association football player

Personal information
- Full name: Pablo Daniel Cantero
- Date of birth: 31 October 1977 (age 49)
- Place of birth: Rosario, Argentina
- Position: Midfielder

Senior career*
Years	Team	Apps	(Gls)
–1998	Central Córdoba		
1998–1999	Colón	28	(2)
1999–2000	Estudiantes	9	(0)
2000	AEK Athens	1	(0)
2000–2001	Central Córdoba		
2001–2002	Gimnasia La Plata	37	(2)
2002–2003	Arsenal Sarandí	24	(0)
2004	Olmedo		
2004	Defensores	6	(0)
2005	Central Córdoba		
2005	Oriente Petrolero		
2006–2013	San Martín de Tucumán	179	(2)
2013–2014	Tiro Federal	5	(0)
- * Club domestic league appearances and goals

Pablo Cantero (born 31 October 1977 in Argentina) is an Argentine retired footballer who played as a midfielder.

== Club career ==
Cantero started his football career at Central Córdoba and in 1998 he moved to Colón, where he played for a season. Afterwards, he signed for Estudiantes.

On 31 January 2000, he was transferred to the Greek side, AEK Athens for a fee of 500 million drachmas.

After his unsuccessful spell in Greece, he was released from the club and returned to Argentina and Central Córdoba for a season. Afterwards, he played successively for Gimnasia La Plata, Arsenal Sarandí and in 2004 he moved to Ecuador and joined Olmedo.

After playing for the Ecuadorian club, he returned to Rosario and in January 2005 he moved to Oriente Petrolero in Bolivia. He then returned to Argentina for San Martín de Tucumán, where he played for 5.5 years. In 2013 he moved to Tiro Federal, where he retired in 2014.
