= Fotis Lagos =

Greek footballer (born 1971)

Personal information
- Date of birth: 10 May 1971 (age 55)
- Place of birth: Athens, Greece
- Height: 1.88 m (6 ft 2 in)
- Position: Defender

Senior career*
Years	Team	Apps	(Gls)
–1993	Chaidari		
1993–1998	Levadiakos		
1998–2003	Ethnikos Asteras		
2003–2004	Chaidari		
- * Club domestic league appearances and goals

Fotis Lagos (Greek: Φώτης Λαγός; born 10 May 1971) is a retired Greek football defender.
