= Georgios Vourexakis =

Greek footballer

Personal information
- Full name: Georgios Nikolaos Vourexakis
- Date of birth: 1 April 1977 (age 49)
- Height: 1.82 m (6 ft 0 in)
- Position: Midfielder

Senior career*
Years	Team	Apps	(Gls)
1997–2003	Apollon Smyrnis		
2003–2008	Ionikos		
2009	Kavala		
2009	Platanias		
2010–2011	Aris Limassol		
2011–2012	Elpidoforos		
- * Club domestic league appearances and goals

Georgios Vourexakis (Greek: Γεώργιος Βουρεξάκης; born 1 April 1977) is a retired Greek football midfielder.
