= Marcelo Leopaldi =

Argentine footballer

Personal information
- Full name: Marcelo Fabián Leopaldi Ledesma
- Date of birth: 2 April 1972 (age 54)
- Place of birth: Santiago del Estero, Argentina
- Height: 1.82 m (6 ft 0 in)
- Position: Midfielder

Senior career*
Years	Team	Apps	(Gls)
1993–1994	Huracán	8	(0)
1994–1996	Deportivo Español	20	(0)
1996–1997	Banfield	27	(0)
1997–1998	Estudiantes	23	(1)
1999	Palestino	36	(0)
2000–2001	Ionikos	20	(1)
2001	→ Monza (loan)	6	(0)
2001–2002	Pro Sesto	15	(0)
2003–2004	Ariano Irpino	7	(0)
2004	Dock Sud	3	(0)
2006	Unión del Norte	–	(–)
- * Club domestic league appearances and goals

Marcelo Fabián Leopaldi Ledesma (born 2 April 1972), commonly known as Marcelo Ledesma, is a former Argentine footballer who played as a midfielder.

== Club career ==
Leopaldi began his career with Club Atlético Huracán in 1993, he went on to play for several other teams in the Primera División Argentina including Deportivo Español, Banfield and Estudiantes de La Plata. In 1999, he played for Chilean club Palestino. After, he spent two seasons with Ionikos in the Super League Greece, and had a loan spell at Monza in Serie B.
