= Michalis Kapsis =

Greek footballer

Personal information
- Full name: Michail Kapsis
- Date of birth: 18 October 1973 (age 53)
- Place of birth: Piraeus, Greece
- Height: 1.82 m (6 ft 0 in)
- Position: Centre-back

Youth career
- 1989–1990: Orfeas Rodos

Senior career*
Years	Team	Apps	(Gls)
1990–1991	Aris Nikea	21	(0)
1991–1992	AO Neapoli	24	(0)
1992–1993	Anagennisi Arta	18	(1)
1993–1999	Ethnikos Piraeus	123	(2)
1999–2004	AEK Athens	111	(3)
2004–2005	Bordeaux	30	(0)
2005–2007	Olympiacos	10	(1)
2007–2008	APOEL	15	(0)
2008–2010	Levadiakos	27	(0)
2010–2011	Ethnikos Piraeus	12	(0)
Total		391	(7)

International career
2003–2007	Greece	36	(1)
Medal record
Men's football
Representing Greece
UEFA European Championship
Winner	2004
- * Club domestic league appearances and goals

Michalis Kapsis (Greek: Μιχάλης Καψής, born 18 October 1973) is a Greek former professional footballer who played as a centre-back. He was an integral part of Greece's UEFA Euro 2004 winning squad.

== Club career ==
=== Aris Nikea ===
Kapsis started his football career in 1990 at Aris Nikea, where he turned in a number of impressive performances in 21 games.

=== AO Neapoli ===
In the summer of 1991, he joined AO Neapoli having an impressive performances for the club playing in 24 games.

=== Anagennisi Arta ===
In the following season, Kapsis signed for the third division side, Anagennisi Arta. There, he played for one season having played 18 matches, scoring once.

=== Ethnikos Piraeus ===
In 1993 he was transferred to Ethnikos Piraeus, where he established himself at the club as a center-back. In his first season, Kapsis helped the team to win the second division championship in 1994 and to get promoted to the first division. He was a key player for the club in the following years, playing to both first and second division winning another second division championship in 1998.

=== AEK Athens ===
On 29 January 1999, Kapsis was transferred to AEK Athens for a fee of 80 million drachmas. He quickly became a regular and he was paired in defence alongside players such as Nikos Kostenoglou, Carlos Gamarra, Mauricio Wright, Vangelis Moras and Traianos Dellas, with whom they also formed the national team's defensive duo. In 2001, where he was fined for his involvement in a training ground incident with Ilias Atmatsidis, as AEK surrendered the championship to Olympiacos in the final matchdays of the season. In 2002, he played in AEK's six draws in the UEFA Champions League group stage. The following season, Kapsis was his usual consistent self, despite the disappointing season for AEK, who finished fifth. During his spell at the club he won two Greek Cups in 2000 and 2002. In the summer of 2004, AEK faced administrative and financial issues and as a result Kapsis was among the footballers that left the club.

=== Bordeaux ===
On 26 July 2004, after the conquest of the Euro, Kapsis was transferred to Bordeaux for a fee of €500,000. He played 29 league matches in France. After this performance many club made an offer to Kapsis for a possible new contract.

=== Olympiacos ===
In the summer 2005 he signed two-year deal with the then champions, Olympiacos. He failed to settle at the club of Piraeus. His frequent injuries and the lack of confidence from successive coaches, deprived him of a first-team slot. There was often speculation about his future at the club, and he was allegedly offered as an exchange in a failed transfer bid for PAOK's Dimitris Salpingidis. At end of the season he won his first Championship and with the conquest of the Cup, he also won the domestic double. Trond Sollied announced on 31 August 2006 that Kapsis would not be included in the team eligible to participate in the Champions League.

=== APOEL ===
In February 2007 Kapsis moved to Cyprus to play for APOEL in Nicosia, and helped the club win the champion title race in 2007. The agreement was for that season only with the option to renew for the next one. Kapsis renewed, extremely pleased with the club. In August 2007 PAOK chairman and former teammate in Greece, Theodoros Zagorakis was interested in bringing him to PAOK. Kapsis stated that was flattered of PAOK's interest, but was also under a contract at APOEL. At the end of the season he also won the 2008 Cypriot Cup.

=== Levadiakos ===
In July 2008 he returned to Greece to sign a two-year contract with Levadiakos. Kapsis made his debut for Levadiakos in the Super League on 31 August 2008 against Aris at the Kleanthis Vikelidis Stadium. He helped the team during the season to stay in the category, being one of the most important and experienced players for his club. The following season he played his first match against Kavala, where he faced his former teammates in the national team, Fanis Katergiannakis and Vasilios Lakis.

=== Ethinikos Piraeus ===
In February 2010 Kapsis returned to Ethnikos Piraeus, as he desire to play for the team where he debuted as a professional player before retiring.

== International career ==
Kapsis with his great performances at a club level, earned a call-up in 2003, to play for Greece in the critical UEFA EURO 2004 qualifying matches against Spain and Ukraine. In those matches he marked Raúl González and Andriy Shevchenko superbly, where Greece won in both games. Afterwards, he was naturally included in the squad of UEFA Euro 2004 that ended up winning the tournament and in particular Kapsis achieved a great performance. Kapsis was included in the Greek squad for the 2005 FIFA Confederations Cup in Germany. Otto Rehhagel also included him in the squad for the qualifying rounds to the UEFA Euro 2008 in Switzerland and Austria. Kapsis made 34 appearances in total and even scored once against Georgia for the FIFA World Cup qualification 2006 on 26 March 2005 in Georgia, where Greece won by 1–3.

== Personal life ==
His father, Anthimos, was also a footballer, who played as a defender for Panathinaikos, where he was a key player in their course to the 1971 European Cup final. In 2002 when Kapsis debuted in the Champions League, became the first player in Greek football that was featured alongside his father, in a Champions League match. The two were followed some years later by Georgios Samaras, son of Ioannis.

== After football ==
After the end of his career, Kapsis was not involved with football and stayed away from the publicity "lights". Today he is a Fire captain in the Hellenic Fire Service.

== Honours ==
Ethnikos Piraeus

- Beta Ethniki: 1993–94, 1997–98

AEK Athens

- Greek Cup: 1999–2000, 2001–02

Olympiacos

- Alpha Ethniki: 2005–06
- Greek Cup: 2005–06

APOEL

- Cypriot First Division: 2006–07
- Cypriot Cup: 2007–08

Greece

- UEFA European Championship: 2004
