= Chrysostomos Michailidis =

Greek footballer and coach (born 1975)

Personal information
- Date of birth: 15 January 1975 (age 51)
- Place of birth: Ptolemaida, Greece
- Height: 1.90 m (6 ft 3 in)
- Position: Goalkeeper

Team information
- Current team: Athens Kallithea (goalkeeping coach)

Senior career*
Years	Team	Apps	(Gls)
1992–1997	Eordaikos	23	(0)
1997–2005	AEK Athens	45	(0)
2001–2002	→ Ethnikos Asteras (loan)	16	(0)
2005–2011	Atromitos	168	(1)
2011–2012	AEL	2	(0)
2012	Panionios	4	(0)
Total		258	(1)

International career
2008–2010	Greece	1	(0)
- * Club domestic league appearances and goals

Chrysostomos Michailidis (Greek: Χρυσόστομος Μιχαηλίδης, born 15 January 1975) is a Greek former professional footballer who played as a goalkeeper.

== Club career ==
Michailidis started his career at Eordaikos where he played for five years. In the summer of 1997 he made the big step of his career and signed for AEK Athens. There, he was used as a goalkeeper during his first seasons. On 9 August 2001, he was loaned to Ethnikos Asteras for a season. In the following season he was the main goalkeeper at AEK, while he in the following years he was as an alternative to Dionysis Chiotis. During his spell at AEK, Michailidis won the Cup in 2000.

In the summer of 2005, his contract was expired and he moved to Atromitos. During his spell at the club he stabilized his performance and had a very good presence for six seasons, while also scoring once with a penalty. With Atromitos he reached the Cup final in 2011, where they faced his former club, AEK and lost 3–0. After Atromitos, he played in AEL and Panionios before ending his career in 2012.

== International career ==
Michailidis has played once for Greece in a friendly match against Finland, coming in as a substitute. National manager Fernando Santos also called him in August 2010 for the Euro 2012 qualifying games against Georgia and Croatia.

== After football ==
In the summer of 2013, Michailidis returned to AEK taking over as goalkeeper coach of the team's academies. In July 2022 he was assigned at AEK Athens B with the same role.

== Honours ==
AEK Athens

- Greek Cup: 1999–2000
