= Nenad Bjeković (footballer, born 1974) =

Serbian footballer

Personal information
- Full name: Nenad Bjeković, Jr.
- Date of birth: 17 February 1974 (age 52)
- Place of birth: Belgrade, SFR Yugoslavia
- Height: 1.88 m (6 ft 2 in)
- Position: Striker

Senior career*
Years	Team	Apps	(Gls)
1991–1995	Partizan	44	(14)
1995–1996	Marseille	18	(0)
1996–1997	Nantes	11	(1)
1997–1998	Châteauroux	7	(0)
1998–1999	Partizan	13	(1)
1999–2000	AEK Athens	21	(5)
2001	Fortuna Sittard	14	(2)
2001–2003	Lommel	18	(0)
Total		146	(23)
- * Club domestic league appearances and goals

Nenad Bjeković Jr. (born 17 February 1974) is a Serbian retired footballer who played mainly as a striker.

== Club career ==
After starting his career with Partizan, Bjeković made a move to French giants Marseille in 1995, but failed to make an impression and he left the club after only one season. Over the next two seasons, Bjeković had short spells with Nantes and Châteauroux, before returning to Partizan in the 1998–99 season.

On 5 July 1999, Bjeković moved to Greece and was transferred to AEK Athens for a fee of 250 million drachmas. There, he was reunited with Ljubiša Tumbaković, but he stayed in the Greek capital only one season. On 31 July 2000 his contract was terminated and Bjeković signed for the Eredivisie side Fortuna Sittard and later played in the Belgian First Division with Lommel.

== Personal life ==
His father Nenad was a renowned footballer who played for Partizan and Nice in the 1970s.

== Honours ==
Partizan

- FR Yugoslavia First League:1992–93 1993–94 1998–99
- FR Yugoslavia Cup:1991–92 1993–94

AEK Athens

- Greek Cup:1999–00
