= Evripidis Katsavos =

Greek footballer

Personal information
- Date of birth: 14 September 1973 (age 53)
- Place of birth: Palatitsia, Veria, Greece
- Height: 1.81 m (5 ft 11 in)
- Position: Midfielder

Youth career
- 1986–1982: Veria

Senior career*
Years	Team	Apps	(Gls)
1992–1997	Veria		
1997–2000	AEK Athens	38	(0)
2000–2001	OFI	15	(0)
2001–2003	Apollon Kalamarias		
2003–2004	Levadiakos		
2004–2005	AEL	3	(0)
2005–2006	Anagennisi Arta		
2006–2007	P.A.O.N.E.		
2007–2008	Anagennisi Epanomi		
- * Club domestic league appearances and goals

Evripidis Katsavos (Greek: Ευριπίδης Κατσαβός; born 14 September 1973) is a retired Greek footballer who played as a midfielder.

== Club career ==
Katsavos started playing football at the age of 13 at the youth teams of Veria, after his school trainer, Giannis Giliopoulos, who was also their manager spotted his talent and persuaded him to join the club. He gradually managed to get promoted to the men's team in 1992, when they were competing in the third division. However, he was unlucky as he injured his meniscus and eventually had to undergo his first surgery. After overcoming his injury and under the manager, Makis Katsavakis, he established himself in the team and helped Veria achieve the promotion to the first division in 1996. His performances in his first season in the first division attracted the interest of many clubs. AEK Athens and Olympiacos were the clubs that insisted the most on acquiring him. The player wanted to play for AEK Athens, the club he supported as a boy, but the president of Veria, Vasilis Tsiamitros wanted to give him to Olympiacos. The result was that the player and the president “collided” and thus Katsavos remained off the pitch for 6 months during this period. Eventually, on 31 July 1997, the football player was vindicated by the financial dispute resolution committee, he was released and signed for the yellow-blacks.

Katsavos made his debut for AEK on 31 August 1997, in the opening match of the Championship and in a goalless draw against PAOK at Toumba Stadium. However, his presence with the yellow and black team was very subdued, and as a result he did not live up to the expectations that existed and the hype that was created with his transfer. At AEK, he won the Cup in 2000. On 3 July 2000 Katsavos was released from the club.

On 5 July 2000 he signed for OFI, where he played for one season. Afterwards, he moved to Apollon Kalamarias, where he spent two seasons before moving to Levadiakos. On 18 July 2004 he signed for AEL but after half a season he was transferred to Anagennisi Arta. There he spent one and a half season and then signed for P.A.O.N.E.. In the summer of 2007 Katsavos moved to Anagennisi Epanomi, where he played for one season before ending his career in 2008.

== After football ==
On 17 August 2023 he became the president of Veria.

== Honours ==
AEK Athens

- Greek Cup: 1999–2000
