= Vasilios Lakis =

Greek footballer

Vasilis Lakis
Personal information
- Full name: Vasilios Lakis
- Date of birth: 10 September 1976 (age 50)
- Place of birth: Thessaloniki, Greece
- Height: 1.76 m (5 ft 9 in)
- Positions: Midfielder; right winger

Youth career
- –1992: Makedonikos Platanos

Senior career*
Years	Team	Apps	(Gls)
1992–1996	Naoussa	67	(7)
1996–1998	Paniliakos	69	(7)
1998–2004	AEK Athens	145	(37)
2004–2005	Crystal Palace	18	(0)
2005–2007	AEK Athens	49	(6)
2007–2009	PAOK	41	(3)
2009–2010	Kavala	17	(0)
Total		406	(60)

International career
1999–2005	Greece	35	(3)
Medal record
Men's football
Representing Greece
UEFA European Championship
Winner	2004
UEFA European U-21 Championship
Runner-up	1998
- * Club domestic league appearances and goals

Vasilios Lakis (Greek: Βασίλειος Λάκης; born 10 September 1976) is a Greek former professional footballer. He was nicknamed "Turbo" for his speed when attacking along the right wing and his ability to provide accurate crosses.

== Club career ==
=== Naoussa ===
Lakis began his career in Naoussa playing as a defender, but his coaches soon switched him to the attacking role more appropriate to his innate talent. His team mates in Naoussa included the future star Vasilios Tsiartas.

=== Paniliakos ===
In the summer of 1995, Lakis signed for the professional club Panileiakos. In the following season, he helped the team to finish seventh in the Greek League by scoring seven goals.

=== AEK Athens ===
On 12 June 1998, Lakis was transferred to AEK Athens for a fee of 320 million drachmas. There he played alongside Demis Nikolaidis, Vasilios Tsiartas and Theodoros Zagorakis. With the yellow-blacks, he won two Greek Cups, one in 2000 against Ionikos and the other in 2002 against their rival, Olympiakos. He was in the squad that reached the Fourth round of the UEFA Cup in 2002 and was eliminated by the Inter Milan of Héctor Raul Cúper. The following season, with the acquisition of Grigorios Georgatos from Inter Milan, AEK reached the group stage of the UEFA Champions League, where they were drawn with Roma and Real Madrid. The club nearly beat Real Madrid after leading 3–1 and then 3–3 at home in the old stadium Nikos Goumas Stadium, but AEK Athens took their revenge in Madrid at the Santiago Bernabéu Stadium, drawing 2–2.

=== Crystal Palace ===
On 29 September 2004, after the conquest of Euro with Greece, Lakis signed as a free agent for Crystal Palace in the Premiership. He made 18 league appearances for Palace. He notably missed the goal from 6 yards in the game against Arsenal at Selhurst Park while the score was 1-1. It is likely that Palace would have won the match had he scored. He was also sent off a in a 0–0 draw with Manchester United. Unfortunately the club was relegated the same year and Lakis decided to return to Greece and AEK Athens.

=== Return to AEK Athens ===
Among Lakis's colleagues at AEK were Traianos Dellas, formerly of Roma, and, as president, Demis Nikolaidis. AEK Athens participated in the 2006–07 UEFA Champions League in the same group as Milan, which they beat at home 1–0 with a goal scored by Júlio César. In the summer of 2007, AEK Athens signed the Brazilian Rivaldo from the Olympiacos and the club reached the top of Greek Championship with their Piraeus rival. He is a pacy right winger who can also play up front, known for his fast-paced end-to-end style of play. He is renowned in his home country for his habit of missing easy chances but his speed, cutting passes, and incisive runs into the box more than makeup for this failing.

=== PAOK ===
On 2 July 2007, Lakis was released by AEK. On 3 July he signed a three-year contract with PAOK, where he was reunited with Zagorakis as the president of the club and Zisis Vryzas as a player, that they won Euro 2004. Lakis helped his new team to gain the second place in the Greek Championship behind Olympiacos and qualifying PAOK for the UEFA Intertoto Cup.

=== Kavala ===
On 1 July 2009, Lakis signed a two-year contract with the football club Kavala.

Lakis with Kavala] reached the semifinal of the Greek Cup against Panionios. In the semifinal Kavala faced Aris.

== International career ==
Lakis made 35 appearances for the Greece national football team and scored his first goal in a friendly match, in April 2000 in Dublin against the Republic of Ireland, in Lansdown Road. The coach Otto Rehhagel called him for the qualification for Euro 2004 and he was included in the Greek squad that won Euro 2004 and made two appearances as a substitute against Portugal in the group-stage and France in the quarterfinal.

=== International goals ===
Scores and results list Greece's goal tally first, score column indicates score after each Lakis goal.

List of international goals scored by Vassilis Lakis
No.	Date	Venue	Opponent	Score	Result	Competition
1	23 February 2000	Kalamata, Greece	Austria		4–1	Friendly
2	26 April 2000	Dublin, Republic of Ireland	Republic of Ireland		1–0	Friendly
3	15 November 2003	Aveiro, Portugal	Portugal		1–1	Friendly

== Honours ==
AEK Athens

- Greek Cup: 1999–2000, 2001–02

Greece

- European Championship: 2004
- UEFA Euro U21: runner-up 1998
