= Demis Nikolaidis =

Greek former footballer (born 1973)

49th president of AEK Athens
- In office 4 August 2004 – 4 November 2008
- Preceded by: Andreas Dimitrelos
- Succeeded by: Giorgos Kintis

Personal details
- Born: 17 September 1973 (age 53) Giessen, West Germany
- Spouse: Despina Vandi (2003–2021)
- Children: 2
- Occupation: Television presenter
Association football career
- Full name: Themistoklis Nikolaidis
- Height: 1.74 m (5 ft 9 in)
- Position: Striker
Youth career
- –1992: Ethnikos Alexandroupoli
Senior career*
Years	Team	Apps	(Gls)
1992–1993	Ethnikos Alexandroupoli	39	(14)
1993–1996	Apollon Athens	80	(38)
1996–2003	AEK Athens	189	(125)
2003–2004	Atlético Madrid	22	(6)
Total		330	(183)
International career
1995–2004	Greece	54	(17)
1997	Greece military		
Medal record
Men's football
Representing Greece
UEFA European Championship
Winner	2004
World Military Cup
Winner	1997
- * Club domestic league appearances and goals

Demis Nikolaidis (Greek: Ντέμης Νικολαΐδης; born 17 September 1973) is a Greek former professional footballer who played as a striker. He was the forty second president of AEK Athens and is considered one of the greatest Greek forwards of his generation. In his early childhood and teenage years he lived in the city of Alexandroupoli, in the northeast part of Greece. In a sterling career with Ethnikos Alexandroupoli, Apollon Smyrnis, AEK Athens and Atlético Madrid, Nikolaidis earned his reputation as a "born goalscorer", scoring prolifically for club and country. His power, pace and skill on the ball have been widely praised.

== Club career ==
=== Early years ===
In his teenage years Nikolaidis played for Ethnikos Alexandroupoli, the local team of his hometown. The scouts of several teams had seen his progress from these years, earning him a move to Athens. He made his professional debut at the age of 20 at Apollon Athens. With Apollon, he reached the Greek Cup final on 15 May 1996, where they were defeated with the record score of 7–1 from AEK Athens. His performances sparked a bidding war between Panathinaikos and Olympiacos, as well as AEK Athens, which was a supporter. Nikolaidis refused to join Olympiacos and forced his club president to sell him to AEK. Thus, on 20 June 1996 he was transferred to AEK for 330 million drachmas and Pantelis Konstantinidis as an exchange.

=== AEK Athens ===
At AEK, Nikolaidis linked up with some of the Greek international players of his generation, including Vasilios Tsiartas, Theodoros Zagorakis, Michalis Kapsis, Grigoris Georgatos, Traianos Dellas, Vasilios Lakis. With his new side, Nikolaidis excelled, scoring on his debut against Ionikos. During his time with AEK, Demis managed to win three Greek Cups and the 1996 Greek Super Cup, while he was the top scorer in the 1998–99 Greek league and second scorer in the 2000–01 UEFA Cup (1 goal behind Dimitar Berbatov). He is the top scorer of Greek clubs in European competitions having scored 26 goals in 51 games. He has scored five goals in a match twice and is the only Greek player to have scored 4 goals in a European match.

Having scored a total of 21 goals in the UEFA Cup he is one of the competition's all-time topscorers. At AEK he scored 190 goals in 266 games (including European, cup and domestic league games) making him the fourth highest goalscorer for the club. On 24 March 2002, the International Committee for Fair Play awarded him with the Fair Play Award, an honorary diploma for his conduct in the Greek Cup Final on 8 May 2000, between the teams of AEK Athens and Ionikos, when Nikolaidis informed the referee he had used his hand to score a goal that had been allowed as valid. In January 2003, Nikolaidis filed a lawsuit against the club boss, Makis Psomiadis, who had come by his house at 3 a.m. to check if he was staying overnight and also for blackmail, insult and threatening his life and physical integrity. During the incident he also stated that apart from Psomiadis, his bodyguards were also present. That incident resulted in his decision to leave the club at the end of the season. He left the club in a mutual consent, even though he was already paid for the rest of his contract.

=== Atlético Madrid ===
On 11 July 2003, Atlético Madrid, after beating several other clubs eventually landed the striker's coveted signature. Seeing that his number 11 was taken, he wore the number 21 as a tribute to AEK and the Original 21 fan club. Nikolaidis' first months at the Vicente Calderón Stadium were a tremendous success, he scored six goals and formed a fearsome attacking pair with teenage sensation Fernando Torres. However, a series of serious injuries kept him out of the first team for nearly the rest of the season and severely affecting his chances of getting picked for Euro 2004. Although Atletico wanted to keep him to the roster of the team, Nikolaidis decided to retire from professional football.

== International career ==
Demis made his debut for Greece on 26 April 1995 against Russia. In 1999, however, along with Michalis Kasapis and Ilias Atmatsidis, Nikolaidis retired from the national team, protesting for injustice in the Greek football. Two years later, after the disappointing tenure of coach Vasilis Daniil was brought to an end after disappointing results, he returned to the international fold.

In his first game in his return, Nikolaidis scored in Greece's 2–2 away draw to England during the 2002 World Cup qualifiers. New coach Otto Rehhagel focused his offense around the quick striker and was rewarded with direct qualification to the Greek team to represent Greece at Euro 2004. Even though struggling with injury, Rehhagel nevertheless included him in his Euro 2004 squad. Greece's new strike force, Zisis Vryzas and Angelos Charisteas, played well enough, but Nikolaidis still figured consistently in the team, coming off the bench in all three group games before starting against France, and leading Greece to a tremendous shock victory. After that performance, however, Nikolaidis was seriously injured and did not even dress for Greece's last two games. He amassed 54 caps, netting 17 times for the national team and is among the top 6 goalscorers ever for Greece.

In 1997 he was called to the military team, where he won the World Military Cup of the same year, playing in the final against Italy.

== Chairman of AEK Athens ==
With AEK struggling in the wake of the corruption Chrarilaos Psomiadis and the prospect of relegation to the fourth division looming, Nikolaidis retired at the relatively young age of 31. His next move, supported by all AEK fans, was to establish a consortium of businessmen and purchase AEK on 27 May 2004, as he had always dreamed. Becoming the club's president on 4 August, Nikolaidis set a goal that he would remove all debts that AEK owed and make them a force in Europe in the space of five years. He and technical director Ilija Ivić, a former teammate, made several clever signings and fought ferociously for the league title, finishing third when many had expected a mid-table performance. In his second year as president, after signing two promising Greece Under-21 players, as well as adding former star Vasilios Lakis, Ukrainian international striker Oleh Venhlinskyi and one time Inter centre back Bruno Cirillo, AEK achieved UEFA Champions League qualification. Apart from the improvement of the economic standards and the athletic performance of AEK, Nikolaidis called upon the league to do more to reduce violence and hooliganism.

On 2 November 2008, Demis decided that he would quit as chairman of AEK after continuously poor results, stating that he had not achieved his goal in the 5 years plan. Nikolaidis said one of his reasons for quitting was that the team didn't sell 30,000 season tickets; he stated "If I had managed to convince the AEK supporters to come to the stadium then I would not be leaving. In my mind we need 30,000 to become a big team". During Nikolaidis's presidency, AEK had their first wins in Champions' League and the club made about 12,000,000 euros from selling players to other teams (like Kostas Katsouranis, Sokratis Papastathopoulos, Dániel Tőzsér, Sotirios Kyrgiakos etc.).

== Personal life ==
Demis was born in Germany and emigrated to Alexandroupoli when he was just 3. In 2003 he married a Greek singer Despina Vandi who was also born in Germany and grew up in Greece. They have a daughter named Melina (2004), and a son named Giorgos (2007). The couple announced their divorce on 15 July 2021.

== Career statistics ==
=== Club ===
Appearances and goals by club, season and competition
Club	Season	League			Cup		Continental		Total	
Club	Season	Division	Apps	Goals	Apps	Goals	Apps	Goals	Apps	Goals
Ethnikos Alexandroupoli	1992–93	Gamma Ethniki	30	7	0	0	0	0	30	7
Ethnikos Alexandroupoli	1993–94	Gamma Ethniki	9	7	1	0	0	0	10	7
Ethnikos Alexandroupoli	Total		39	14	1	0	0	0	40	14
Apollon Smyrnis	1993–94	Alpha Ethniki	18	5	0	0	0	0	18	5
Apollon Smyrnis	1994–95	Alpha Ethniki	33	17	5	1	0	0	38	18
Apollon Smyrnis	1995–96	Alpha Ethniki	29	16	12	10	2	0	43	26
Apollon Smyrnis	Total		80	38	17	11	2	0	99	49
AEK Athens	1996–97	Alpha Ethniki	31	19	7	3	6	1	44	23
AEK Athens	1997–98	Alpha Ethniki	26	19	1	0	5	2	32	21
AEK Athens	1998–99	Alpha Ethniki	29	22	0	0	4	6	33	28
AEK Athens	1999–2000	Alpha Ethniki	32	22	8	11	8	3	48	36
AEK Athens	2000–01	Alpha Ethniki	25	15	4	4 (Note: His goal against Olympiacos on 10 January 2001 didn't count as the game was suspended.)	8	6	37	25
AEK Athens	2001–02	Alpha Ethniki	24	16	7	6	8	5	39	27
AEK Athens	2002–03	Alpha Ethniki	22	12	2	1	12	3	36	16
AEK Athens	Total		189	125	29	25	51	26	269	176
Atlético Madrid	2003–04	La Liga	22	6	1	0	0	0	23	6
Career total			330	183	48	36	53	26	431	245

=== International ===
Appearances and goals by national team and year
National team	Year	Apps	Goals
Greece	1995	4	2
Greece	1996	9	6
Greece	1997	7	0
Greece	1998	2	0
Greece	1999	8	3
Greece	2000	0	0
Greece	2001	3	3
Greece	2002	8	3
Greece	2003	7	0
Greece	2004	6	0
Total		54	17

Scores and results list Greece's goal tally first, score column indicates score after each Nikolaidis goal.

List of international goals scored by Demis Nikolaidis
No.	Date	Venue	Opponent	Score	Result	Competition
1	1995–06–11	Helsinki Olympic Stadium, Helsinki, Finland	Finland	1–0	1–2	UEFA Euro 1996 qualifying
2	1995–11–15	Theodoros Vardinogiannis Stadium, Heraklion, Greece	Faroe Islands	2–0	5–0	UEFA Euro 1996 qualifying
3	1996–04–24	Athens Olympic Sports Complex, Athens, Greece	Slovenia	2–0	2–0	1998 FIFA World Cup qualification
4	1996–05–08	Zosimades Stadium, Ioannina, Greece	Georgia	1–0	2–0	Friendly
5	1996–05–08	Zosimades Stadium, Ioannina, Greece	Georgia	2–0	2–0	Friendly
6	1996–08–14	Athens Olympic Sports Complex, Athens, Greece	Albania	1–0	2–1	Friendly
7	1996–09–01	Kalamata Metropolitan Stadium, Kalamata, Greece	Bosnia and Herzegovina	3–0	3–0	1998 FIFA World Cup qualification
8	1996–11–10	Stadion Maksimir, Zagreb, Croatia	Croatia	1–0	1–1	1998 FIFA World Cup qualification
9	1999–02–03	GSZ Stadium, Larnaca, Cyprus	Finland	1–1	2–1	Friendly
10	1999–03–10	Athens Olympic Sports Complex, Athens, Greece	Croatia	3–2	3–2	Friendly
11	1999–10–09	Ljudski vrt, Maribor, Slovenia	Slovenia	3–0	3–0	UEFA Euro 2000 qualifying
12	2001–10–06	Old Trafford, Manchester, England	England	2–1	2–2	2002 FIFA World Cup qualification
13	2001–11–10	Nikos Goumas Stadium, Athens, Greece	Estonia	1–0	4–2	Friendly
14	2001–11–10	Nikos Goumas Stadium, Athens, Greece	Estonia	2–0	4–2	Friendly
15	2002–05–12	Alexandroupoli, Greece	Romania	1–0	3–2	Unofficial Friendly
16	2002–10–16	Leoforos Alexandras Stadium, Athens, Greece	Armenia	1–0	2–0	UEFA Euro 2004 qualifying
17	2002–10–16	Leoforos Alexandras Stadium, Athens, Greece	Armenia	2–0	2–0	UEFA Euro 2004 qualifying

== Honours ==
AEK Athens

- Greek Cup: 1996–97, 1999–2000, 2001–02
- Greek Super Cup: 1996

Greece military

- World Military Cup: 1997

Greece

- UEFA European Championship: 2004

Individual

- Alpha Ethniki top scorer: 1998–99
- Greek Cup top scorer: 1995–96, 1999–2000
- Greek Young Footballer of the year: 1995
- Greek Footballer of the year: 1997, 1998, 2002
- Fair Play Diploma for Act of Fair Play: 2002

== Records ==
- Second Greek goalscorer in European competitions scoring a total of 26 goals.
- One of the few player who have scored five goals in a single Greek Super League game. He did so in AEK Athens' 6–1 win against Kalamata during the 1996–97 season.
- Scorer of Greece's 500th goal on 6 October 2001 in a match against England.
