= Georgios Kazantzis =

Greek footballer

Personal information
- Full name: Georgios Kazantzis
- Date of birth: 6 February 1979 (age 47)
- Place of birth: Greece
- Position: Forward

Youth career
- Chalkida

Senior career*
Years	Team	Apps	(Gls)
1998–2001	Proodeftiki	49	(11)
2001–2003	Aris	36	(2)
2004	Proodeftiki	13	(5)
2004–2006	OFI	31	(5)
2006–2009	Kallithea		
2010–	Glyfada		
- * Club domestic league appearances and goals

Georgios Kazantzis (Greek: Γιώργος Καζαντζής; born 6 February 1979) is a Greek football player.

== Career ==
Kazantzis began his professional career by signing for Proodeftiki in July 1998. He joined Aris Thessaloniki in October 2001 but returned to Proodeftiki in January 2004. He also played for OFI in the Alpha Ethniki.
