= Traianos Dellas =

Greek footballer and manager

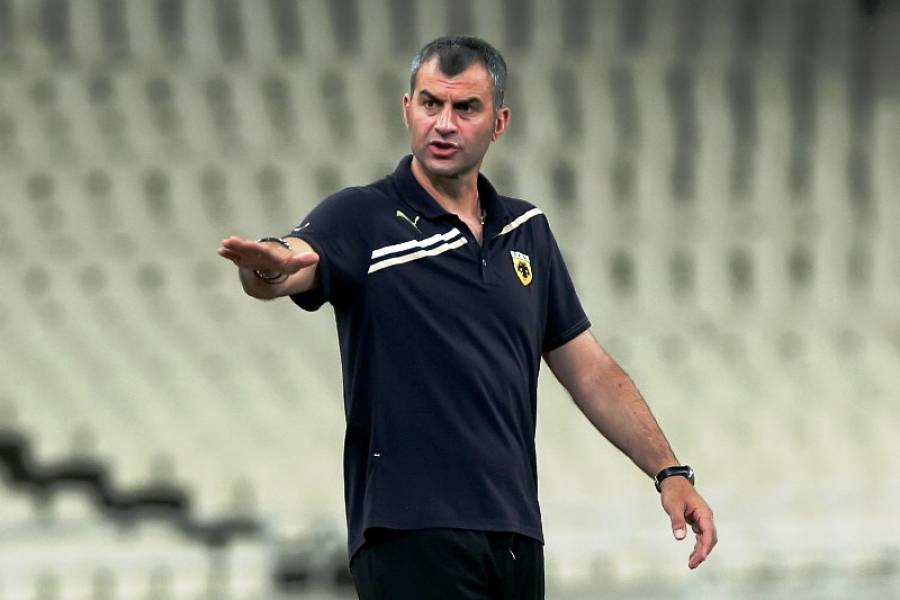
- Dellas as a manager of AEK Athens

Personal information
- Full name: Traianos Dellas
- Date of birth: 31 January 1976 (age 50)
- Place of birth: Thessaloniki, Greece
- Height: 1.96 m (6 ft 5 in)
- Position: Centre-back

Youth career
- 1987–1993: Aris

Senior career*
| Years | Team | Apps | (Gls) |
| 1993–1997 | Aris | 22 | (4) |
| 1994–1996 | → Panserraikos (loan) | 39 | (5) |
| 1997–1999 | Sheffield United | 26 | (3) |
| 1999–2001 | AEK Athens | 40 | (4) |
| 2001–2002 | Perugia | 8 | (0) |
| 2002–2005 | Roma | 44 | (2) |
| 2005–2008 | AEK Athens | 54 | (3) |
| 2008–2010 | Anorthosis | 35 | (2) |
| 2010–2012 | AEK Athens | 39 | (3) |
| Total | | 307 | (26) |

International career
| 1995–1998 | Greece U21 | 20 | (3) |
| 2001–2009 | Greece | 53 | (1) |

Managerial career
- 2013–2015: AEK Athens
- 2015–2016: Atromitos
- 2018–2019: Panetolikos
- 2020–2021: Panetolikos
- 2024: OFI
Medal record
Men's football
Representing Greece
UEFA European Championship
| Winner | 2004 |
UEFA European U-21 Championship
| Runner-up | 1998 |
- * Club domestic league appearances and goals

Traianos Dellas (Greek: Τραϊανός Δέλλας; born 31 January 1976) is a Greek professional football manager and former player. He last managed Super League club OFI.

He was an integral part of Greece's Euro 2004 winning squad, during which he became the only player to score a silver goal in an international football match.

== Club career ==
=== Aris ===
Dellas started playing football professionally in 1993 at Aris for two years, where he helped the Thessaloniki side qualify for the 1994–95 UEFA Cup. He played alongside Fanis Katergiannakis, who was also part of the Greek squad at Euro 2004.

In the summer of 1994, Dellas was loaned to Panserraikos for two seasons, where he quickly became a regular.

=== Sheffield United ===
Dellas came back to Aris before leaving for England to join Sheffield United. He was best remembered by fans at Bramall Lane for a game against Tranmere Rovers in March 1999. With the Blades 2–0 down, Dellas came on as a substitute and scored twice as they won 3–2. His other goal came from an impressive 30-yard strike in a home game against Portsmouth, another late winner.

=== AEK Athens ===
In the summer of 1999, Dellas returned to Greece and signed for AEK Athens through a recommendation by Vasilis Dimitriadis. He won the Greek Cup in 2000, playing alongside the likes of Demis Nikolaidis and Vasilios Tsiartas. Dellas had a fairly good presence for two season, but a fall-out with club president Chrarilaos Psomiadis, as well as the manager Fernando Santos led to his release on 5 August 2001.

=== Perugia ===
On 4 September 2001 Dellas signed for the Italian club, Perugia. However, Dellas was dropped from Perugia's first team after a disagreement over his contract and he did not make a single appearance in the last six months of the season, playing only eight matches overall.

=== Roma ===
After leaving the club Dellas caught the attention of Serie A club Roma and he joined the team on a free transfer in 2002. After finally establishing himself as a starter following the move of coach Fabio Capello to Juventus, Dellas's performances were outstanding. He earned the peculiar honour of being one of three players alongside Francesco Totti and Vincenzo Montella who were not consistently booed by the fans during training and games during Roma's disastrous 2004–05 season. After failing to renew his contract with the club, Dellas became a free agent. He would eventually miss nearly 8 months of football due to back and hernia injuries and thus, expected offers from the big clubs of Europe failed to materialize.

=== Return to AEK Athens ===
On 19 September 2005 Dellas returned to AEK, where his former teammate and friend Demis Nikolaidis was the president. He renewed his contract in June 2007 for a further two years and became team captain. Here Dellas played alongside players like Rivaldo, Pantelis Kafes and the talented Sokratis Papastathopoulos. In AEK came very close of winning the league, but the opportunity was lost due to the "Wallner case" and the title went to Olympiacos. On 23 July 2008, Dellas and AEK agreed to terminate his contract by mutual consent after failing to agree on a new contract.

=== Anorthosis Famagusta ===
On 24 July 2008 agreed to sign a two-year deal with Cypriot football club Anorthosis Famagusta. Dellas helped the team to qualify for the UEFA Champions League in the season 2008–09, in the same group with Panathinaikos and Inter Milan of José Mourinho.

=== AEK Athens and retirement ===
On 2 July 2010, Dellas signed for AEK Athens and alongside Nikos Liberopoulos who also returned at the club the became the clubs captains. On 12 December 2010, Dellas scored his first goal in the Greek championship after two years' absence, against AEL. On 16 March 2011 he scored in the semi-final of the cup against PAOK and sent AEK to the final of the tournament. On 30 April 2011, Dellas won with AEK his second Cup. He played at AEK for one more season when on 26 May 2012, Dellas announced his retirement from professional football.

== International career ==
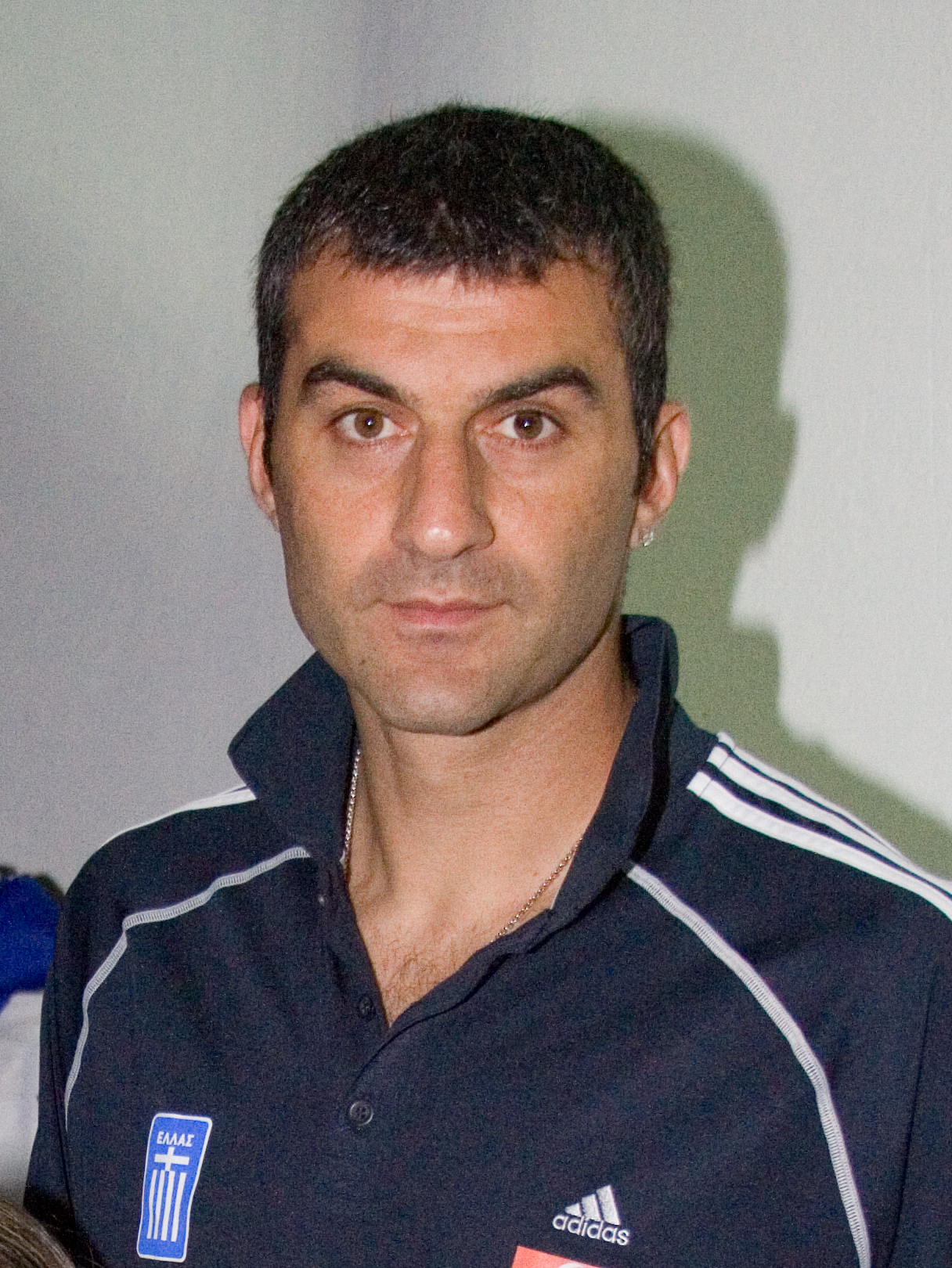
Dellas with the Greece national team in 2008

Dellas earned his first cap for Greece in April 2001 in a 2–2 draw with Croatia. Dellas had an exceptional tournament at Euro 2004, partnering again with his former teammate at AEK, Michalis Kapsis in the centre of what became an almost impenetrable Greek defence, operating as a sweeper, and keeping a clean-sheet in a 1–0 victory over hosts Portugal in the final; his performance led to him being voted into the tournament all-star squad. During the semi-finals, he scored the only silver goal ever in the last minute of first half of extra time against the Czech Republic, allowing Greece to progress to the final. This was his only goal for the Greek squad.
The coach of Greece called him 'the Colossus of Rhodes' in respect of his performances in the tournament and the moniker is now widely used in the press.

After Euro 2004, Dellas continued to be the heart of the Greek defense, but missed nearly eight months in 2005 due to injury. His absence was seen as a major factor in Greece's failed 2006 FIFA World Cup qualifying campaign. Two years later, Dellas helped Greece qualify for Euro 2008 but could not find his form of 2004 as Greece exited the group stage without any points and having scored just one goal. He was also part of the 2010 FIFA World Cup qualifying campaign but was not called up after the victory over Israel on 1 April 2009. Subsequently, he was not included in the provisional squad for the 2010 FIFA World Cup.

== Managerial career ==
On 4 April 2013, Dellas was appointed as AEK Athens's new coach, replacing Ewald Lienen, with Akis Zikos being appointed as assistant manager. Following AEK's relegation from the Super League, Dellas remained at the club's wheel in Greece's third division, instead of the second tier in order to clear the team's debts. He successfully led the team back in the Super League in 2015. On 20 October 2015, Dellas resigned, after a 4–0 loss to Olympiacos.

On 7 November 2015, he signed a contract with club Atromitos. On 12 January 2018, he signed a contract with Panetolikos. He resigned on 19 April 2019. On 10 November 2020, Panetolikos announced his return as the manager of the club in a need of gaining points for avoiding relegation. His second tenure ended officially on 5 June 2021, after the club thanking him for having successfully avoided relegation for the club, which was achieved thanks to an away goal in a (2–1) defeat, and a late goal victory at home (1–0) in the 2nd leg of the relegation play-offs.

== Personal life ==
Delas’s first marriage lasted for 8 years.

Dellas was married to Greek gymnast and model Gogo Mastrokosta. Τhe civil wedding took place on, 11 September 2008 and the religious wedding was on, 28 May 2010. They were married up to her death on 25 May 2026.They have one daughter.

== Career statistics ==
=== International ===
Appearances and goals by national team and year
| National team | Year | Apps | Goals |
|---|---|---|---|
| Greece | 2001 | 1 | 0 |
| Greece | 2002 | 4 | 0 |
| Greece | 2003 | 7 | 0 |
| Greece | 2004 | 13 | 1 |
| Greece | 2005 | 2 | 0 |
| Greece | 2006 | 5 | 0 |
| Greece | 2007 | 7 | 0 |
| Greece | 2008 | 12 | 0 |
| Greece | 2009 | 2 | 0 |
| Total | | 53 | 1 |

Scores and results list Greece's goal tally first, score column indicates score after each Dellas goal.

List of international goals scored by Traianos Dellas
| No. | Date | Venue | Opponent | Score | Result | Competition |
|---|---|---|---|---|---|---|
| 1 | 1 July 2004 | Estádio do Dragão, Porto, Portugal | Czech Republic | 1–0 | 1–0 | UEFA Euro 2004 |

=== Managerial ===
As of 6 October 2024

| Team | Nat | From | To | Record | | | | | | | |
| Team | Nat | From | To | G | W | D | L | GF | GA | GD | Win % |
|---|---|---|---|---|---|---|---|---|---|---|---|
| AEK Athens | (Greece) | 9 April 2013 | 20 October 2015 | 80 | 60 | 12 | 8 | 186 | 50 | +136 | 75.00 |
| Atromitos | (Greece) | 7 November 2015 | 18 September 2016 | 31 | 13 | 9 | 9 | 30 | 31 | −1 | 41.94 |
| Panetolikos | (Greece) | 12 January 2018 | 30 June 2019 | 47 | 16 | 10 | 21 | 47 | 65 | −18 | 34.04 |
| Panetolikos | (Greece) | 10 November 2020 | 30 June 2021 | 29 | 7 | 6 | 16 | 19 | 41 | −22 | 24.14 |
| OFI | (Greece) | 14 February 2024 | 11 October 2024 | 19 | 6 | 8 | 5 | 33 | 26 | +7 | 31.58 |
| Total | | | | 206 | 102 | 45 | 59 | 315 | 213 | +102 | 49.51 |

== Honours ==
=== Player ===
AEK Athens

- Greek Cup: 1999–2000, 2010–11

Greece

- UEFA European Championship: 2004

Greece U21

- UEFA European Under-21 Championship runner-up: 1998

Individual

- UEFA European Championship Team of the Tournament: 2004
- Nova Awards Best Super League Greece Team: 2010–11

=== Manager ===
AEK Athens

- Football League 2: 2013–14 (Group 6)
- Football League: 2014–15
