= Stelios Chasiotis =

Greek footballer (born 1972)

Personal information
- Full name: Stylianos Chasiotis
- Date of birth: 11 May 1972 (age 54)
- Height: 1.81 m (5 ft 11 in)
- Position: Defender

Senior career*
Years	Team	Apps	(Gls)
–1996	Apollon Larissa		
1996–1999	Edessaikos		
1999–2004	Panionios		
2004–2006	Ethnikos Asteras		
- * Club domestic league appearances and goals

Stelios Chasiotis (Greek: Στέλιος Χασιώτης; born 11 May 1972) is a retired Greek football defender.
