= Trond Inge Haugland =

Norwegian footballer (born 1976)

Personal information
- Date of birth: 23 March 1976 (age 50)
- Height: 1.88 m (6 ft 2 in)
- Position: Defender

Senior career*
Years	Team	Apps	(Gls)
1993–1997	Trio		
1998–1999	Flora Tallinn		
1999–2003	Ionikos	58	(0)
2003	Vålerenga	1	(0)
2004	Pors	23	(2)
2005–2013	Trio		
- * Club domestic league appearances and goals

Trond Inge Haugland (born 23 March 1976) is a retired Norwegian football defender.

A player for lowly IL Trio since 1993, Haugland dreamt about a football venture abroad. He was scouted by one Terje Simonsen and joined FC Flora Tallinn. After one and a half season in Estonia, he went on to Greek Ionikos. During his four years there, he played in the Alpha Ethniki, the 1999–2000 UEFA Cup and lost the 1999–2000 Greek Cup final.

In the summer of 2003 Haugland moved home to join Norwegian first-tier club Vålerenga. Playing only one league game, he moved elsewhere and played the 2004 season in Pors. From 2005 to 2013 he rounded off his career in IL Trio. He made a comeback few years later to help local 6th division club Rosendal playing a total of 9 matches there in 2018 and 2019 season.

He is currently involved in his former club Trio in different roles.
