= Martín Rodríguez (footballer, born 1968) =

Peruvian footballer

Personal information
- Full name: Martín Eulogio Rodríguez Custodio
- Date of birth: 24 September 1968 (age 58)
- Place of birth: Lima, Peru
- Height: 1.82 m (6 ft 0 in)
- Position: Midfielder

Senior career*
Years	Team	Apps	(Gls)
1993–1996	Universitario		
1997–1998	Deportivo Municipal	31	(0)
1998–2000	Ionikos	58	(0)
2001	Cienciano		
2001–2002	Chalkidona	9	(0)

International career
1991–1995	Peru	19	(0)
- * Club domestic league appearances and goals

Martín Eulogio Rodríguez Custodio (born 24 September 1968) is a former Peruvian footballer.

== Club career ==
Rodríguez played for a number of clubs in Peru, including Universitario de Deportes and Deportivo Municipal. He also had a spell with Ionikos in the Super League Greece from January 1998 through July 2000.

== International career ==
Rodríguez made 19 appearances for the senior Peru national football team from 1991 to 1995, including three matches at the 1995 Copa América.
