= Giannis Xanthopoulos =

Greek footballer

Personal information
- Date of birth: 23 June 1967 (age 59)
- Place of birth: Drama, Greece
- Position: Defender

Youth career
- –1985: Doxa Drama

Senior career*
Years	Team	Apps	(Gls)
1985–1990	Doxa Drama	30	(2)
1990–2004	Ionikos	303	(21)
Total		333	(23)
- * Club domestic league appearances and goals

Giannis Xanthopoulos (Greek: Γιάννης Ξανθόπουλος; born 23 June 1967) is a Greek former footballer who played as a defender. He spent 19 years playing in the Alpha Ethniki for Doxa Drama and Ionikos.
