= Lazaros Iakovou =

Cypriot footballer (born 1976)

Personal information
- Full name: Lazaros Iakovou
- Date of birth: August 5, 1976 (age 50)
- Place of birth: Larnaca, Cyprus
- Height: 1.82 m (6 ft 0 in)
- Position: Defender

Senior career*
Years	Team	Apps	(Gls)
1997–1999	AEK Larnaca	1	(0)
1999–2000	Panachaiki	11	(0)
2000–2003	Alki Larnaca	25	(0)
2003–2004	Apollon Limassol	22	(2)
2004–2005	Apollon Kalamarias	10	(0)
2004	Apollon Limassol	7	(0)
2005–2006	Panachaiki	4	(0)
2006–2007	Omonia Aradippou	21	(0)
2007–2008	Nea Salamina	0	(0)
2009–2010	Digenis Morphou	3	(0)

International career
2002–2004	Cyprus	7	(0)
- * Club domestic league appearances and goals

Lazaros Iakovou (Greek: Λάζαρος Ιακώβου; born August 5, 1976) is a retired Cypriot defender who played for Nea Salamina. He started his career in AEK Larnaca. He also played abroad and especially in Greece for Panachaiki F.C. and Apollon Kalamarias.

== International career ==
Iakovou made his international debut with the Cyprus national team on 13 February 2002, in the final of Cyprus International Tournament 2002 against the Czech Republic at GSP Stadium, playing the whole of Cyprus' 4–3 defeat.
