= Giannis Gyrichidis =

Greek footballer

Personal information
- Full name: Ioannis Gyrichidis
- Date of birth: 9 March 1974 (age 52)
- Place of birth: Giannitsa, Greece
- Height: 1.74 m (5 ft 9 in)
- Position: Midfielder

Senior career*
Years	Team	Apps	(Gls)
–1997	Anagennisi Giannitsa		
1997–2001	Ionikos		
2001–2002	Panachaiki		
2002–2003	Ionikos		
2003–2004	Kerkyra		
2004	Niki Volos		
2005	Olympiacos Volos		
2005	Kozani		
2005	Doxa Drama		
2006	Polykastro		
2006–2007	Anagennisi Giannitsa		
2007–2008	Aetos Skydra		
2008–2009	Paiko Goumenissa		
- * Club domestic league appearances and goals

Giannis Gyrichidis (Greek: Γιάννης Γυριχίδης; born 9 March 1974) is a retired Greek football midfielder.
