= Akis Zikos =

Greek footballer

Personal information
- Full name: Andreas Vasilios Zikos
- Date of birth: 1 June 1974 (age 52)
- Place of birth: Athens, Greece
- Height: 1.80 m (5 ft 11 in)
- Position: Defensive midfielder

Youth career
- –1993: AS Papagou

Senior career*
Years	Team	Apps	(Gls)
1993–1998	Skoda Xanthi	114	(4)
1998–2002	AEK Athens	105	(6)
2002–2006	Monaco	103	(2)
2006–2008	AEK Athens	50	(0)
Total		372	(12)

International career
1996–2001	Greece	18	(0)

Managerial career
- 2013–2015: AEK Athens Academy
- 2017–2018: AEK Athens Academy
- 2021–: A.O. Glyfada (Academy)
- * Club domestic league appearances and goals

Akis Zikos (Greek: Άκης Ζήκος; born 1 June 1974) is a Greek former professional footballer who played as a defensive midfielder. He was a strong and industrious player, known for his tackling and positioning skills. At international level, he played for the Greece national team making 18 appearances between 1996 and 2001. He currently works as an academy manager for A.O. Glyfada.

== Club career ==
=== Skoda Xanthi ===
Zikos started his professional career in 1993 with Skoda Xanthi for whom he spent 4 seasons in the Alpha Ethniki.

=== AEK Athens ===
In the summer of 1998 Zikos was transferred to AEK Athens for a fee of 130 million drachmas. He immediately established himself as the team's main defensive midfielder and it didn't take him long to impress with his performances. He was a key player with all the coaches who passed through the team's bench, while he gradually played more and more in the national team. With the transfer of Thodoris Zagorakis to the club in 2000, they formed an amazing partnership in the midfield of the team for two years. Zikos won the Greek Cup in two occasions, 2000 and 2002. In the summer of 2002, not having the best relations with the then administrative leader of the team, Psomiadis, he decided to leave, taking the big step abroad at the same time.

=== Monaco ===
In the summer of 2002 he was signed by Monaco, where he played for four seasons in Ligue 1. He also proved his talent with the club on the European stage. In 2003, he won the Coupe de la Ligue and in 2004, under Didier Deschamps they made it to the UEFA Champions League Final where they lost to José Mourinho's Porto in Arena AufSchalke, Gelsenkirchen. Despite their heavy loss (3–0 for FC Porto), Zikos was recognized one of the best players on the pitch that day. His appearance in the final made Zikos the first Greek to play in a UEFA Champions League final.

=== Return to AEK ===
On 14 August 2006, after 4 full successful years in France, Zikos decided to return to his home country and AEK Athens. Zikos, in an injury plagued year for AEK Athens, helped the team to finish in second place and achieve a Champions League 3rd qualification round berth. He retired from football on 20 April 2008 on the final game of the regular season.

== International career ==
He won 18 caps for Greece, but fell out of favor when coach Otto Rehhagel took over the team. After helping Monaco to the 2004 UEFA Champions League Final, he was considered for selection in Greece's victorious Euro 2004 squad, however he was ultimately overlooked.

== Honours ==
AEK Athens

- Greek Cup: 1999–2000, 2001–02

Monaco

- French League Cup: 2003
- UEFA Champions League: Runner-up 2003–04
