= 2001–02 AEK Athens F.C. season =

AEK Athens
2001–02 season
- Chairman: Cornelius Sierhuis (until 11 July); Filon Antonopoulos (until 2 January); Charilaos Psomiadis
- Manager: Fernando Santos
- Stadium: Nikos Goumas Stadium
- Alpha Ethniki: 2nd
- Greek Cup: Winners
- UEFA Cup: Round of 16
- Top goalscorer: League: Demis Nikolaidis (17); All: Demis Nikolaidis; Vasilios Tsiartas (28 each)
- Highest home attendance: 18,151 vs Olympiacos (20 January 2002)
- Lowest home attendance: 124 vs Agios Nikolaos (28 November 2001)
- Average home league attendance: 8,248
- Biggest win: AEK Athens 6–0 Grevenmacher; AEK Athens 6–0 Kilkisiakos
- Biggest defeat: Internazionale 3–1 AEK Athens; Ethnikos Asteras 2–0 AEK Athens; Panathinaikos 2–0 AEK Athens
Home colours	Away colours	Third colours

The 2001–02 season was the 78th season in the existence of AEK Athens F.C. and the 43rd consecutive season in the top flight of Greek football. They competed in the Alpha Ethniki, the Greek Cup and the UEFA Cup. The season began on 6 August 2001 and finished on 8 May 2002.

== Kits ==
Supplier: Nike
Sponsor(s): Alpha Digital

Home	Away	Third

== Overview ==
The summer of 2001 found AEK Athens once again in the midst of great administrative and financial problems. The multinationals ENIC and Netmed were searching all summer for interested parties to buy the or take over the management of the club. Eventually, the controversial businessman and well known from his past in the basketball team, Chrarilaos Psomiadis, through the company "Ippoventure", became the new boss of AEK. Psomiadis initially put in the position of president his friend and businessman, Filon Antonopoulos and later his cousin, Charilaos. In the competitive part, however, Psomiadis seemed to be quite capable, as he brought Fernando Santos as the new manager and signed the Paraguayan international defender, Carlos Gamarra, on loan from Flamengo.

AEK started the championship well and from an outsider they slowly became a favorite for the title, with Santos demonstrating a disciplined and well-done team. However, 3 consecutive defeats in January suddenly made the situation very difficult and the first problems in the Psomiadis-Santos relations begun. Nevertheless, the team continued well and competed with Olympiacos for the title until the end. Eventually, on 20 April, in a match that was deemed as "final" for the penultimate matchday at the Olympic Stadium, Olympiacos won by 4–3 and conclusively AEK lost the title in a draw with 58 points each.

In the first round of the UEFA Cup, AEK had a theoretically easy task, having to face the weak Grevenmacher from Luxembourg. The first match took place at Nea Filadelfeia and AEK were storming. The 2 goals in the first half by Tsiartas and Zagorakis and another 4 in the second half by Nikolaidis, Lakis and Konstantinidis, gave an impressive victory to the yellow-blacks. The crowd was extremely satisfied and the rematch was of a formal procedure. In the rematch in Luxembourg AEK didn't struggle at all with 1 goal in each half with Lakis and Konstantinidis, while also missing plenty of chances. The majority of AEK's fans at the stadium was remarkable. In the second round, AEK found the obstacle of the Scottish Hibernian. The first match was played in Athens and in front of about 18,000 people, AEK won a penalty with Georgeas at the 55th minute and Tsiartas capitalized on it. In the 68th minute, a header by Nikolaidis made it 2–0 and gave AEK a good score for the second match. It was worth noting that with this goal, Demis Nikolaidis reached 17 goals for the UEFA Cup and became the Greek top scorer of all time for this competition. At the Easter Road, Hibernian pressed AEK, who were lucky to draw the first half 0–0. However, in the second half, 2 goals by Luna equalized the score of the first match and the game went to extra-time, where Tsiartas showed his class and with 2 personal goals with a shot and a direct corner kick, gave AEK the qualification. All the Scots managed to do was to score a third goal 5 minutes before the end of extra-time, getting an honorable victory with 3–2. In the third round, the draw again favored AEK, who found in front of them another "passable" opponent, the Croatian Osijek. In the first match in Croatia, AEK entered the game strongly and took the lead in the 12th minute with Zagorakis, while in the 70th minute Nikolaidis made it 0–2, but immediately after that the Croatians reduced it to 1–2. AEK kept the score in their favor until the end and was the clear favorite for qualification. In the second leg in Athens, AEK soon found themselves behind with a 15th-minute own goal by Ferrugem, but turned the score around to be leveled by the Osijek at 2–2 before half-time. Eventually, a goal by Konstantinidis in the 79th minute, gave the yellow-blacks the qualification. In the next round, another theoretically passable opponent was drawn against AEK, the Bulgarian Litex Lovech. The first match took place at Nikos Goumas Stadium and AEK came in impressively from the start and scoring 3 goals by the 23rd minute and with the Bulgarians reducing it to 3–1 in the 30th minute. In the second half, AEK conceded another goal for the final 3–2 and the Bulgarians to re-enter the qualification game. In the rematch in frozen Lovech, AEK were called upon to qualify in a match that took place in very difficult weather conditions. A goal by their top player in the match, Gamarra, at the 6th minute, brought AEK very close to the qualification, who even though conceding a goal at the end of the match, had already qualified. AEK reached the round of 16 of the institution and the margins for passable draws were narrowed. They were eventually drawn with the mighty Internazionale and things became extremely difficult. The first match at Stadio Giuseppe Meazza started impressively for AEK, who took the lead in the 8th minute with a great shot by Zagorakis. However, the Italian team quickly recovered and with two goals from Zanetti and Kallon made it 2–1 before the break, while their superiority was then sealed with another goal in the 56th minute from Ventola. The rematch was indeed difficult. In a packed Nikos Goumas Stadium, AEK tried to press, but in their first chance of Inter conceded a goal with free-kick by Greško at the 20th minute. AEK equalized after 3 minutes with a header by Konstantinidis and overturned the score with Nikolaidis at the 56th minute making the crowd heated as it brought the team just one goal away from extra-time, but the experienced and quality Italians immediately equalized with Ventola, which shaped the final 2–2. AEK's European course ended there, with an elimination with their "heads up".

In the Cup, AEK initially qualified by playing in a group with Panserraikos, Egaleo, and Nafpaktiakos Asteras. After an easy qualification over Agios Nikolaos, their next opponent were Kilkisiakos with the yellow-blacks achieving an even easier qualification. In the quarter-finals, AEK faced PAOK. In the first leg of Nikos Goumas Stadium, AEK prevailed with 2–1, while in the second leg of Toumba Stadium seemed difficult, but in the end it turned out to be a "strawl" as the yellow-blacks won by 0–4. In the semi-finals, AEK were drawn against Skoda Xanthi. The first match at Xanthi ended with 0–0 and AEK seemed as the favorite for the rematch. In the end, the Xanthi team proved to be "tougher", the match ended 0–0 and went to extra-time. There, however, a goal by Ilija Ivić in the 106th minute gave AEK the qualification for the final, against Olympiacos. The cup final took place a week after the "championship final" and beyond its given importance, it was AEK's opportunity for a revenge. The match was very strong from the start and despite the chances, the first-half ended 0–0. In the 51st minute, Nikolaidis won a penalty, Tsiartas executed it, the ball hit the two posts, reached Nikolaidis who shot, and after going against the body of Konstantinidis, ended up in the net. Olympiacos then pushed for the equalizer and eventually succeeded at the 70th minute with a header by Giovanni, who was sent-off 9 minutes later for an unsportsmanlike hit on Konstantinidis. At the 81st minute, Ivić entered the match and 2 minutes later, after a foul by Tsiartas, he scored the winning goal with a header and AEK won the title.

The top scorer of the season for the yellow-blacks in the Championship was Nikolaidis with 17 goals, while Tsiartas also scored 16 goals. The presence of Gamarra in defense was also noteworthy.

== Management team ==
Position	Staff
Manager	(Portugal) Fernando Santos
Assistant manager	(Bosnia and Herzegovina) Jasminko Velić
Assistant manager	(Portugal) Jorge Rosário
Assistant manager	(Greece) Antonis Minou
Academy director	(Greece) Andreas Stamatiadis
Academy manager	(Greece) Giorgos Karafeskos
Head of Medical	(Greece) Lakis Nikolaou

== Players ==
=== Squad information ===
NOTE: The players are the ones that have been announced by the AEK Athens' press release. No edits should be made unless a player arrival or exit is announced. Updated 8 May 2002, 23:59 UTC+3.

No.	Player	Nat.	Position(s)	Date of birth (Age)	Signed	Previous club	Transfer fee	Contract until
Goalkeepers
1	Ilias Atmatsidis	(Greece)	GK	24 April 1969 (aged 33)	1992	(Greece) Pontioi Veria	€120,000	2002
22	Dionysis Chiotis	(Greece)	GK	4 June 1977 (aged 25)	1995	(Greece) AEK Athens U20	—	2005
27	Sotiris Liberopoulos	(Greece)	GK	29 June 1977 (aged 25)	2001	(Greece) Kalamata	Free	2005
Defenders
3	Ferrugem	(Brazil)	CB / DM	6 October 1980 (aged 21)	2000	(Brazil) Palmeiras	Free	2005
4	Carlos Gamarra	(Paraguay)	CB	17 February 1971 (aged 31)	2001	(Brazil) Flamengo	€600,000	2002
5	Nikos Kostenoglou (Vice-captain)	(Greece)	CB / RB	3 October 1970 (aged 31)	1994	(Greece) Skoda Xanthi	€200,000	2003
12	Georgios Xenidis	(Greece)	LB / CB	6 December 1974 (aged 27)	2002	(Greece) Iraklis	Free	2004
15	Éric Rabésandratana	(Madagascar)	CB / DM	18 September 1972 (aged 29)	2001	(France) Paris Saint-Germain	€1,800,000	2004
16	Nikolaos Georgeas	(Greece)	RB / LB / DM	27 December 1976 (aged 25)	2001	(Greece) Kalamata	€1,500,000	2004
17	Michalis Kasapis	(Greece)	LB / LM	6 August 1971 (aged 30)	1993	(Greece) Levadiakos	€75,000	2006
21	Vaios Karagiannis	(Greece)	LB / CB	25 June 1968 (aged 34)	1990	(Greece) A.O. Karditsa	€35,000	2002
25	Stathis Kappos	(Greece) (Canada)	RB	31 July 1979 (aged 22)	2001	(Greece) Kalamata	Free	2005
32	Michalis Kapsis	(Greece)	CB	18 October 1973 (aged 28)	1999	(Greece) Ethnikos Piraeus	€250,000	2003
39	Grigoris Toskas	(Greece)	CB	8 January 1983 (aged 19)	2000	(Greece) AEK Athens U20	—	2005
Midfielders
6	Theodoros Zagorakis (Captain)	(Greece)	CM / DM / AM / RM / CB / RB	27 October 1971 (aged 30)	2000	(England) Leicester City	Free	2003
7	Christos Maladenis	(Greece)	CM / RM / LM / AM / DM / RW / LW / SS	23 May 1974 (aged 28)	1995	(Greece) Skoda Xanthi	€300,000	2003
10	Vasilios Tsiartas (Vice-captain 2)	(Greece)	AM / RM / LM / SS	12 November 1972 (aged 29)	2000	(Spain) Sevilla	€3,500,000	2003
14	Akis Zikos	(Greece)	DM / CM	1 June 1974 (aged 28)	1998	(Greece) Skoda Xanthi	€700,000	2006
18	Giorgos Passios	(Greece) (Australia)	DM / CM / CB	4 May 1980 (aged 22)	1997	(Greece) AEK Athens U20	—	2003
19	Bledar Kola	(Albania) (Greece)	LM / CM / DM / LB	1 August 1972 (aged 29)	2001	(Greece) Panathinaikos	Free	2003
23	Vasilios Lakis	(Greece)	RM / RW / AM / CM / RB	10 September 1976 (aged 25)	1998	(Greece) Paniliakos	€1,000,000	2003
28	Milen Petkov	(Bulgaria)	DM / CM / AM / RM / LM	12 January 1974 (aged 28)	2000	(Bulgaria) CSKA Sofia	€800,000	2003
33	Fernando Navas	(Argentina)	LM / AM / RM	29 January 1977 (aged 25)	2000	(Argentina) Boca Juniors	€2,000,000	2005
41	Dimitris Karameris	(Greece)	CM / DM	16 April 1983 (aged 19)	2000	(Greece) AEK Athens U20	—	2005
Forwards
11	Demis Nikolaidis	(Greece) (Germany)	ST / SS	17 September 1973 (aged 28)	1996	(Greece) Apollon Athens	€1,000,000	2004
20	Sotiris Konstantinidis	(Greece)	RW / LW / RM / LM / AM	19 April 1979 (aged 23)	1999	(Greece) Iraklis	Free	2004
24	Christos Kostis	(Greece)	SS / ST / AM / RW / LW	15 January 1972 (aged 30)	2000	(Belgium) Anderlecht	Free	2002
26	António Folha	(Portugal)	LW / LM / AM	21 May 1971 (aged 31)	2002	(Portugal) Porto	Free	2002
30	Ilija Ivić	(Federal Republic of Yugoslavia)	ST / LW	17 February 1971 (aged 31)	2002	(Greece) Aris	Free	2005
Left during Winter Transfer Window
2	Maricá	(Brazil)	RB	24 September 1979 (aged 22)	2001	(Brazil) Vasco da Gama	Free	2002
9	Grzegorz Mielcarski	(Poland)	ST	19 May 1971 (aged 31)	2001	(Poland) Pogoń Szczecin	Free	2003
29	Ilias Anastasakos	(Greece)	ST / LW / LM	3 March 1978 (aged 24)	1995	(Greece) A.O. Dafniou	Free	2002
31	Georgios Trichias	(Greece)	RW / ST	14 October 1979 (aged 22)	2001	(Greece) Niki Volos	Free	2005

== Transfers ==
=== In ===
==== Summer ====
No.	Pos.	Player	From	Fee	Date	Contract Until	Source
9	FW	(Poland) Grzegorz Mielcarski	(Poland) Pogoń Szczecin	Free transfer	31 July 2001	30 June 2003	
15	DF	(Madagascar) Éric Rabésandratana	(France) Paris Saint-Germain	€1,800,000	27 July 2001	30 June 2004	
25	DF	(Canada) Stathis Kappos	(Greece) Kalamata	Free transfer	9 August 2001	30 June 2005	
27	GK	(Greece) Sotiris Liberopoulos	(Greece) Kalamata	Free transfer	9 August 2001	30 June 2005	
29	FW	(Greece) Ilias Anastasakos	(Greece) Kalamata	Loan return	1 July 2001	30 June 2002	
31	FW	(Greece) Georgios Trichias	(Greece) Panetolikos	Loan return	1 July 2001	31 December 2005	
—	GK	(Greece) Lefteris Petkaris	(Greece) Kilkisiakos	Loan return	1 July 2001	30 June 2001	
—	DF	(Greece) Georgios Paraskevaidis	(Greece) Panionios	Loan return	1 July 2001	30 June 2001	
—	MF	(Bulgaria) Ivan Rusev	(Greece) Athinaikos	Loan return	1 July 2001	30 June 2005	
—	MF	(Argentina) Luis Darío Calvo	(Greece) Kalamata	Loan return	1 July 2001	30 June 2001	
—	FW	(Greece) Giorgos Kartalis	(Greece) Agios Nikolaos	Loan return	1 July 2001	30 June 2001	
—	FW	(Cyprus) Giorgos Kavazis	(Greece) Kalamata	Loan return	1 July 2001	30 June 2003	

==== Winter ====
No.	Pos.	Player	From	Fee	Date	Contract Until	Source
12	DF	(Greece) Georgios Xenidis	(Greece) Iraklis	Free transfer	3 January 2002	30 June 2004	
30	FW	(Federal Republic of Yugoslavia) Ilija Ivić	(Greece) Aris	Free transfer	2 January 2002	30 June 2005	
33	MF	(Argentina) Fernando Navas	(Greece) Aris	Loan return	25 February 2002	30 June 2004	

=== Out ===
==== Summer ====
No.	Pos.	Player	To	Fee	Date	Source
2	DF	(Greece) Traianos Dellas	(Italy) Perugia	Contract termination	4 September 2001	
12	DF	(Greece) Charis Kopitsis	(Greece) Egaleo	Contract termination	10 August 2001	
27	DF	(Argentina) Hernán Medina	(Argentina) Boca Juniors	Loan return	1 July 2001	
—	GK	(Greece) Lefteris Petkaris	(Greece) Aris	End of contract	1 July 2001	
—	DF	(Greece) Georgios Paraskevaidis	(Greece) Athinaikos	End of contract	1 July 2001	
—	MF	(Argentina) Luis Darío Calvo	(Argentina) Boca Juniors	Loan return	1 July 2001	
—	FW	(Greece) Giorgos Kartalis	(Greece) Trikala	End of contract	1 July 2001	
—	FW	(Cyprus) Giorgos Kavazis	(Cyprus) Apollon Limassol	Contract termination	1 July 2001	

==== Winter ====
No.	Pos.	Player	To	Fee	Date	Source
2	DF	(Brazil) Maricá	(Brazil) Vasco da Gama	Loan termination	28 December 2001	
9	FW	(Poland) Grzegorz Mielcarski	(Poland) Amica Wronki	Contract termination	9 January 2002	
29	FW	(Greece) Ilias Anastasakos	(Greece) Athinaikos	Contract termination	18 January 2002	

=== Loan in ===
==== Summer ====
No.	Pos.	Player	From	Fee	Date	Until	Option to buy	Source
2	DF	(Brazil) Maricá	(Brazil) Vasco da Gama	Free	10 August 2001	30 June 2002	✗	
4	DF	(Paraguay) Carlos Gamarra	(Brazil) Flamengo	€600,000	24 July 2001	30 June 2002	✓	

==== Winter ====
No.	Pos.	Player	From	Fee	Date	Until	Option to buy	Source
26	FW	(Portugal) António Folha	(Portugal) Porto	Free	3 January 2002	30 June 2002	✗	

=== Loan out ===
==== Summer ====
No.	Pos.	Player	To	Fee	Date	Until	Option to buy	Source
15	GK	(Greece) Chrysostomos Michailidis	(Greece) Ethnikos Asteras	Free	9 August 2001	30 June 2002	✗	
31	DF	(Greece) Christos Pitos	(Greece) Marko	Free	1 July 2001	30 June 2002	✗	
30	FW	(Argentina) Emanuel Ruiz	(Argentina) Unión Santa Fe	Free	22 August 2001	30 June 2002	✗	
—	MF	(Bulgaria) Ivan Rusev	(Greece) Apollon Smyrnis	Free	1 July 2001	30 June 2002	✗	

==== Winter ====
No.	Pos.	Player	To	Fee	Date	Until	Option to buy	Source
31	FW	(Greece) Georgios Trichias	(Greece) Apollon Smyrnis	Free	18 January 2002	30 June 2002	✗	
33	MF	(Argentina) Fernando Navas	(Greece) Aris	Free	29 January 2002	30 June 2002	✗	

=== Contract renewals ===
No.	Pos.	Player	Date	Former Exp. Date	New Exp. Date	Source
14	MF	(Greece) Akis Zikos	16 October 2001	30 June 2002	30 June 2006	
17	DF	(Greece) Michalis Kasapis	2 August 2001	30 June 2002	30 June 2006	
21	DF	(Greece) Vaios Karagiannis	12 July 2001	30 June 2001	30 June 2002	
24	FW	(Greece) Christos Kostis	12 July 2001	30 June 2001	30 June 2002	

=== Overall transfer activity ===
==== Expenditure ====
Summer: ▼€2,400,000

Winter: ▼€0

Total: ▼€2,400,000

==== Income ====
Summer: ▲€0

Winter: ▲€0

Total: ▲€0

==== Net Totals ====
Summer: ▼€2,400,000

Winter: €0

Total: ▼€2,400,000

== Pre-season and friendlies ==
15 July 2001 Friendly	Eintracht Braunschweig	0–3	AEK Athens	Schneverdingen
15:00 EEST (UTC+3)		Report	Petkov 18'; Konstantinidis 38'; Trichias 66'	Stadium: Schneverdingen sports center Attendance: 100

17 July 2001 Friendly	Einheit Wernigerode	0–6	AEK Athens	Schneverdingen
20:00 EEST (UTC+3)		Report	Tsiartas 11' (pen.); Nikolaidis 15', 24', 68'; Konstantinidis 38'; Maladenis 60'	Stadium: Schneverdingen sports center

20 July 2001 Friendly	St. Pauli	0–3	AEK Athens	Hamburg
21:00 EEST (UTC+3)		Report	Nikolaidis 22', 41', 68'	Stadium: Millerntor-Stadion; Attendance: 200

21 July 2001 Friendly	AEK Athens	0–0	Osnabrück	Osnabrück
		Report		Stadium: Stadion an der Bremer Brücke; Attendance: 4,000

28 July 2001 Friendly	AEK Athens	7–0	Apollon Kalamarias	Nea Filadelfeia
21:00 EEST (UTC+3)	Tsiartas 15' (pen.); Lakis 44', 50', 53'; Konstantinidis 69'; Kola 75'; Navas 75'	Report		Stadium: Nikos Goumas Stadium; Attendance: 4,000; Referee: Theofilaktos Papapanagiotou (Piraeus)

3 August 2001 Nova Supersports Cup	AEK Athens	1–0	Sevilla	Nea Filadelfeia
21:30 EEST (UTC+3)	Kapsis (yellow card); Nikolaidis 23'	Report		Stadium: Nikos Goumas Stadium; Attendance: 5,000; Referee: Giorgos Kasnaferis (Athens)
Note: 45-minute match.

3 August 2001 Nova Supersports Cup	AEK Athens	0–1	Bologna	Nea Filadelfeia
22:30 EEST (UTC+3)	Zagorakis (yellow card)	Report	Signori (yellow card); Castellini (yellow card); Nervo 2'	Stadium: Nikos Goumas Stadium; Attendance: 5,000; Referee: Giorgos Borovilos (Arcadia)
Note: 45-minute match.

12 August 2001 Friendly	AEK Athens	2–1	Tottenham	Nea Filadelfeia
20:15 EEST (UTC+3)	Tsiartas 9'; Ferrugem 26'	Report	Poyet 6'	Stadium: Nikos Goumas Stadium; Referee: Spyros Papadakos (Laconia)

8 September 2001 Friendly	AEK Athens	3–1	Panionios	Nea Filadelfeia
21:00 EEST (UTC+3)	Mielcarski (yellow card); Konstantinidis 11', 40'; Zikos 70'	Report	Mantzios (yellow card); Gonias 33'	Stadium: Nikos Goumas Stadium; Attendance: 4,000; Referee: Giorgos Kasnaferis (Athens)

16 September 2001 Friendly	AEK Athens	2–1	Panachaiki	Nea Filadelfeia
21:00 EEST (UTC+3)	Maladenis 7', 42'	Report	Kobayashi 75'	Stadium: Nikos Goumas Stadium; Attendance: 4,000; Referee: Spyros Voulgaris (Piraeus)

== Competitions ==
=== Overall record ===
Competition	First match	Last match	Starting round	Final position	Record							
Competition	First match	Last match	Starting round	Final position	Pld	W	D	L	GF	GA	GD	Win %
Alpha Ethniki	23 September 2001	8 May 2002	Matchday 1	2nd	26	19	1	6	65	28	+37	73.08
Greek Cup	6 August 2001	27 April 2002	Group stage	Winners	15	13	2	0	45	9	+36	86.67
UEFA Cup	9 August 2001	28 February 2002	Qualifying round	Fourth round	10	6	2	2	24	14	+10	60.00
Total					51	38	5	8	134	51	+83	74.51

Last updated: 8 May 2002
Source: Competitions

=== Alpha Ethniki ===
==== League table ====
Pos	Team	Pld	W	D	L	GF	GA	GD	Pts	Qualification or relegation
1	Olympiacos (C)	26	17	7	2	69	30	+39	58 (Note: Head-to-head record: AEK Athens–Olympiacos 2–3, Olympiacos–AEK Athens 4–3.)	Qualification for Champions League first group stage
2	AEK Athens	26	19	1	6	65	28	+37	58	Qualification for Champions League third qualifying round
3	Panathinaikos	26	16	7	3	53	25	+28	55	Qualification for UEFA Cup first round
4	PAOK	26	14	6	6	55	45	+10	48	Qualification for UEFA Cup first round
5	Skoda Xanthi	26	12	6	8	34	26	+8	42	Qualification for UEFA Cup first round

Source: Galanis Sports Data
Rules for classification: 1st points; 2nd head-to-head points; 3rd head-to-head goal difference; 4th decision match.
(C) Champions

==== Results summary ====
Overall								Home						Away					
Pld	W	D	L	GF	GA	GD	Pts	W	D	L	GF	GA	GD	W	D	L	GF	GA	GD
26	19	1	6	65	28	+37	58	12	0	1	40	9	+31	7	1	5	25	19	+6

Source: Competitive matches

==== Results by Matchday ====
Round	1	2	3	4	5	6	7	8	9	10	11	12	13	14	15	16	17	18	19	20	21	22	23	24	25	26
Ground	A	H	H	A	H	A	H	A	A	H	A	H	A	H	A	A	H	A	H	A	H	H	A	H	A	H
Result	W	W	W	L	W	W	W	W	W	W	L	L	L	W	W	D	W	L	W	W	W	W	W	W	L	W
Position	5	1	1	2	2	1	1	1	1	1	1	2	2	1	1	1	1	2	2	2	1	1	1	1	2	2

Source: Competitive matches
A = Away; H = Home; W = Win; D = Draw; L = Loss; P = Postponed

==== Matches ====
23 September 2001 1	Ionikos	1–2	AEK Athens	Nikaia
20:30 EEST (UTC+3)	Kakiousis (yellow card) 4'; Vilanakis 79'; Vlachos (yellow card) 81'		Tsiartas 5' (pen.); Zagorakis (yellow card) 28'; Lakis 52'; Konstantinidis (yellow card) 60'	Stadium: Neapoli Municipal Stadium; Attendance: 2,661; Referee: Manolis Giannadakis (Lasithi)

30 September 2001 2	AEK Athens	4–0	Egaleo	Nea Filadelfeia
17:00 EEST (UTC+3)	Mielcarski 19'; Tsiartas 37' (pen.); Ferrugem (yellow card) 53'; Nikolaidis 68'; Zagorakis 82'		Fotakis (yellow card) 16' (yellow-red card) 57'; Sourlis (yellow card) 35'; Diop (yellow card) 38'	Stadium: Nikos Goumas Stadium; Attendance: 5,238; Referee: Vasilis Skoufitsas (Athens)

14 October 2001 3	AEK Athens	2–0	Skoda Xanthi	Nea Filadelfeia
16:00 EEST (UTC+3)	Zikos (yellow card) 18'; Mielcarski 57'; Maladenis 82'		Gager (yellow card) 4'; Vallas (yellow card) 21'; Zapropoulos (yellow card) 52'; Zografakis (yellow card) 90'	Stadium: Nikos Goumas Stadium; Attendance: 6,707; Referee: Christos Trikalis (Trikala)

21 October 2001 4	Ethnikos Asteras	2–0	AEK Athens	Kaisariani
16:00 EEST (UTC+3)	Papadimitriou (yellow card) 17', (goal) 90+3'; Kontopoulos 53'; Papadopoulos (yellow card) 57'; Kiourkos (yellow card) 68'; Basinas (yellow card) 72'; Edusei (yellow card) 85'		Tsiartas (penalty missed) 16'; Zikos (yellow card) 24'	Stadium: Michalis Kritikopoulos Stadium; Attendance: 3,450; Referee: Giannis Bisogiannis (Thessaloniki)

4 November 2001 5	AEK Athens	2–0	Panathinaikos	Nea Filadelfeia
21:15 EET (UTC+2)	Tsiartas 27'; Konstantinidis (yellow card) 58'; Nikolaidis 78'; Petkov (yellow card) 82'			Stadium: Nikos Goumas Stadium; Attendance: 13,169; Referee: Makis Efthimiadis (Drama)

18 November 2001 6	OFI	0–1	AEK Athens	Heraklion
17:00 EET (UTC+2)	Simos (yellow card) 52'		Maladenis 62'	Stadium: Theodoros Vardinogiannis Stadium; Attendance: 6,696; Referee: Nikos Angelakis (Thessaloniki)

25 November 2001 7	AEK Athens	3–0	Akratitos	Nea Filadelfeia
15:00 EET (UTC+2)	Nikolaidis 47', 54' (pen.); Konstantinidis 74'		Tatsis (yellow card) 44'	Stadium: Nikos Goumas Stadium; Attendance: 3,398; Referee: Christoforos Zografos (Athens)

2 December 2001 8	Panachaiki	0–1	AEK Athens	Patras
19:00 EET (UTC+2)	K. Konstantinidis (yellow card) 77'; Vukčević (yellow card) 90+3'		Lakis 32'; Zagorakis (yellow card) 79'; Kasapis (yellow card) 80'; Atmatsidis (yellow card) 83'	Stadium: Kostas Davourlis Stadium; Attendance: 7,225; Referee: Stavros Kremastiotis (Argolida)

9 December 2001 9	Panionios	2–6	AEK Athens	Nea Smyrni
19:00 EET (UTC+2)	Mantzios 1', (yellow card) 3' (yellow-red card) 56'; Ioannou 66'		Tsiartas 14' (pen.); Kostenoglou (yellow card) 19'; Konstantinidis 42'; Zagorakis 49', 78'; Nikolaidis 64', (yellow card) 90'; Ferrugem 88'	Stadium: Nea Smyrni Stadium; Attendance: 4,390; Referee: Kyros Vassaras (Thessaloniki)

16 December 2001 10	AEK Athens	4–2	Aris	Nea Filadelfeia
17:00 EET (UTC+2)	Konstantinidis 18'; Kasapis (yellow card) 24'; Nikolaidis 53', 83'; Tsiartas 64' (pen.)		Chiba 7', 68' (pen.); Morris (yellow card) 26'; Koltsidas (yellow card) 48'; Papadopoulos (yellow card) 53'; Theodoridis (yellow card) 71' (yellow-red card) 79'	Stadium: Nikos Goumas Stadium; Attendance: 7,474; Referee: Spyros Voulgaris (Piraeus)

13 January 2002 11	Iraklis	3–2	AEK Athens	Thessaloniki
17:00 EET (UTC+2)	Natsouras (yellow card) 6'; Kyriazis 10'; Kebadze 41'; Milojević (yellow card) 53'; Fofonka 61'; Haxhi (yellow card) 73'		Lakis (yellow card) 34'; Maladenis 49'; Tsiartas 77' (pen.)	Stadium: Kaftanzoglio Stadium; Attendance: 11,624; Referee: Giorgos Borovilos (Arcadia)

20 January 2002 12	AEK Athens	2–3	Olympiacos	Nea Filadelfeia
19:00 EET (UTC+2)	Nikolaidis 8', (yellow card) 57'; Tsiartas 43'; Kasapis (yellow card) 45'		Alexandris 22'; Zé Elias (yellow card) 44'; Giovanni 77'; Đorđević 88'	Stadium: Nikos Goumas Stadium; Attendance: 18,151; Referee: Makis Efthimiadis (Drama)

27 January 2002 13	PAOK	3–2	AEK Athens	Thessaloniki
17:00 EET (UTC+2)	Georgiadis (yellow card) 11', (goal) 33'; Katsabis (yellow card) 32', (goal) 40'; Okkas 75'		Georgeas (yellow card) 17'; Nikolaidis 33'; Ferrugem (yellow card) 36'; Lakis 38'	Stadium: Toumba Stadium; Referee: Giorgos Douros (Corinthia)

3 February 2002 14	AEK Athens	4–0	Ionikos	Nea Filadelfeia
15:00 EET (UTC+2)	Mikes 19' (o.g.); Nikolaidis 56'; Tsiartas 65' (pen.); Ivić 70'		Afash (yellow card) 40'; Curbelo (yellow card) 57'; Strakosha (yellow card) 64'; Mikes (yellow card) 90+4'	Stadium: Nikos Goumas Stadium; Attendance: 9,000; Referee: Dimitris Pissas (Imathia)

10 February 2002 15	Egaleo	1–3	AEK Athens	Nikaia
17:00 EET (UTC+2)	Psomas (yellow card) 12'; Meidanis 42'; Del Signore (yellow card) 48'; Fotakis (yellow card) 52'; Bikić (yellow card) 63'		Nikolaidis 34'; Tsiartas 65' (pen.); Maladenis 76'	Stadium: Nikaia Municipal Stadium; Attendance: 2,920; Referee: Giorgos Douros (Corinthia)

17 February 2002 16	Skoda Xanthi	1–1	AEK Athens	Xanthi
17:00 EET (UTC+2)	Gager (yellow card) 13'; Zografakis (yellow card) 26'; Ba (yellow card) 29'; Geladaris (yellow card) 30'; Ouakili 38'		Lakis (yellow card) 22'; Ferrugem (yellow card) 37'; Maladenis 62'	Stadium: A.O. Xanthi Stadium; Attendance: 7,656; Referee: Kyros Vassaras (Thessaloniki)

24 February 2002 17	AEK Athens	1–0	Ethnikos Asteras	Nea Filadelfeia
15:00 EET (UTC+2)	Kostenoglou (yellow card) 32'; Lakis 40'		Tsalikis (yellow card) 7'; Berneanou (yellow card) 79'; Papadopoulos (yellow card) 89'	Stadium: Nikos Goumas Stadium; Attendance: 7,028; Referee: Vasilis Skoufitsas (Athens)

3 March 2002 18	Panathinaikos	2–0	AEK Athens	Ampelokipoi
19:00 EET (UTC+2)	Basinas (yellow card) 8', (goal) 12' (pen.); Karagounis 21'; Kyrgiakos (yellow card) 28'			Stadium: Leoforos Alexandras Stadium; Attendance: 15,166; Referee: Giorgos Tsangarakis (Chania)

10 March 2002 19	AEK Athens	3–0	OFI	Nea Filadelfeia
17:00 EET (UTC+2)	Nikolaidis 6'; Lakis 58', 90+1'		Digozis (yellow card) 48'; Moschogiannis (yellow card) 87'	Stadium: Nikos Goumas Stadium; Attendance: 5,944; Referee: Lambros Gouvas (Arta)

17 March 2002 20	Akratitos	0–1	AEK Athens	Ano Liosia
19:00 EET (UTC+2)	Velentzas (penalty missed) 2'; Magafinis (yellow card) 38'; Koutsokostas (yellow card) 49'; Pozapalidis (yellow card) 54'		Ferrugem (yellow card) 2'; Tsiartas 30'; Ivić (yellow card) 57'	Stadium: Giannis Pathiakakis Stadium; Attendance: 2,826; Referee: Dimitris Takidis (Kilkis)

23 March 2002 21	AEK Athens	4–1	Panachaiki	Nea Filadelfeia
19:30 EET (UTC+2)	Tsiartas (penalty missed) 3', 22', 52'; Xenidis (yellow card) 23'; Georgeas (yellow card) 32'; Zikos 48'; Maladenis 76'		Kefalas (yellow card) 45+1'; Mitsiopoulos (yellow card) 46'; Kiourkos (yellow card) 51'; Vukčević 89'	Stadium: Nikos Goumas Stadium; Attendance: 4,291; Referee: Vasilis Terovitsas (Aetoloacarnania)

31 March 2002 22	AEK Athens	2–1	Panionios	Nea Filadelfeia
18:00 EEST (UTC+3)	Folha (yellow card) 48'; Efthymiadis 58' (o.g.); Tsiartas (penalty missed) 68', (yellow card) 88'; Nikolaidis 83'		Efthymiadis (yellow card) 32'; Bellaj 44'; Mouzaoui (yellow card) 69'	Stadium: Nikos Goumas Stadium; Attendance: 7,199; Referee: Kostas Finokaliotis (Athens)

7 April 2002 23	Aris	0–3	AEK Athens	Thessaloniki
17:15 EEST (UTC+3)	Papadopoulos (yellow card) 89'		Ivić 28'; Tsiartas 33'; Georgeas (yellow card) 63'; Nikolaidis 71'	Stadium: Aris Stadium; Attendance: 7,330; Referee: Thanasis Briakos (Epirus)

14 April 2002 24	AEK Athens	3–0	Iraklis	Nea Filadelfeia
17:30 EEST (UTC+3)	Natsouras 27' (o.g.); Ivić 56'; Zikos (yellow card) 70'; Nikolaidis 84'		Milojević (yellow card) 89'	Stadium: Nikos Goumas Stadium; Attendance: 8,651; Referee: Makis Efthimiadis (Drama)

20 April 2002 25	Olympiacos	4–3	AEK Athens	Marousi
19:00 EEST (UTC+3)	Giovanni (yellow card) 26'; Amanatidis (yellow card) 27'; Alexandris 43', 58'; Patsatzoglou 52', (yellow card) 53'; Đorđević 90+1'		Georgeas (yellow card) 20'; Zikos (yellow card) 22'; Tsiartas 24' (pen.), 75' (pen.); Kostenoglou (yellow card) 69'; Lakis 90+5'	Stadium: Olympic Stadium; Attendance: 60,292; Referee: Kyros Vassaras (Thessaloniki)

8 May 2002 26	AEK Athens	6–2	PAOK	Nea Filadelfeia
17:30 EEST (UTC+3)	Tsiartas 2'; Nikolaidis 24', 54'; Chiotis (yellow card) 28'; Lakis 42'; Konstantinidis 63'; Ivić 90'		Georgiadis (penalty missed) 29'; Voskaridis 85', 89'	Stadium: Nikos Goumas Stadium; Attendance: 11,079; Referee: Spyros Papadakos (Laconia)

=== Greek Cup ===
==== Group 1 ====
Pos	Team	Pld	W	D	L	GF	GA	GD	Pts	Qualification	AEK	EGA	PNS	NAF
1	AEK Athens	6	5	1	0	25	7	+18	16	Second Round		2–0	5–0	4–0
2	Egaleo	6	2	3	1	10	8	+2	9	Second Round	3–3		0–0	3–1
3	Panserraikos	6	2	2	2	7	12	−5	8		1–5	1–1		2–1
4	Nafpaktiakos Asteras	6	0	0	6	6	21	−15	0		3–6	1–3	0–3	

Source: epo.gr

==== Matches ====
6 August 2001 1	Panserraikos	1–5	AEK Athens	Serres
18:15 EEST (UTC+3)	Chibuzor 84'	Report (page 1)	Navas 32'; Tsiartas 36', 76', 88'; Ferrugem 47'	Stadium: Serres Municipal Stadium; Referee: Giannis Bisogiannis (Thessaloniki)

29 August 2001 2	Nafpaktiakos Asteras	3–6	AEK Athens	Nafpaktos
17:00 EEST (UTC+3)	Loukopoulos 18'; Zapantiotis 70'; Kyparissis 76'	Report (page 1-2)	Nikolaidis 7', 31' (pen.), 51', 63', 73'; Zagorakis 67'	Stadium: Papacharalambeio National Stadium; Referee: Giorgos Douros (Corinthia)

19 August 2001 3	AEK Athens	2–0	Egaleo	Nikaia
19:00 EEST (UTC+3)	Zagorakis (yellow card); Zikos 55'; Tsiartas 60' (pen.)	Report (page 2)	Manousakis (yellow card); Diop (yellow card); Psomas (yellow card); Ouanga (yellow card)	Stadium: Nikaia Municipal Stadium; Referee: Christoforos Zografos (Athens)

26 August 2001 4	AEK Athens	5–0	Panserraikos	Nea Filadelfeia
21:00 EEST (UTC+3)	Ferrugem (yellow card); Maladenis 29'; Konstantinidis 39', 61'; Lakis 63'; Petkov 70'	Report (page 2)	Savvidis (yellow card)	Stadium: Nikos Goumas Stadium; Attendance: 3,000; Referee: Iraklis Tsikinis (Messinia)

11 October 2001 5	AEK Athens	4–0	Nafpaktiakos Asteras	Nea Filadelfeia
20:00 EEST (UTC+3)	Anastasakos (yellow card); Kola 14'; Kostis 35'; Kosandianos 39' (o.g.); Maladenis 47'	Report (page 3)	Panourgias (yellow card)	Stadium: Nikos Goumas Stadium; Attendance: 287; Referee: Pavlos Papilias (Piraeus)

7 November 2001 6	Egaleo	3–3	AEK Athens	Nikaia
15:30 EET (UTC+2)	Makris 55', 59'; Nikolopoulos 58'	Report (page 3)	Trichias 8'; Kola 34'; Maladenis 79'	Stadium: Nikaia Municipal Stadium; Referee: Giorgos Kasnaferis (Athens)

===== Second round =====
28 November 2001 First leg	AEK Athens	3–0	Agios Nikolaos	Nea Filadelfeia
19:00 EET (UTC+2)	Ferrugem 26'; Trichias 80'; Konstantinidis 87'	Report (page 33)	Seliniotakis (yellow card); Angelakis (yellow card)	Stadium: Nikos Goumas Stadium; Attendance: 124; Referee: Spyros Voulgaris (Piraeus)

19 December 2001 Second leg	Agios Nikolaos	0–1 (0–4 agg.)	AEK Athens	Agios Nikolaos
14:45 EET (UTC+2)		Report (page 34)	Georgeas (yellow card); Passios (yellow card); Trichias 77'	Stadium: Agios Nikolaos Municipal Stadium; Referee: Giorgos Tsangarakis (Chania)

===== Round of 16 =====
9 January 2002 First leg	Kilkisiakos	0–1	AEK Athens	Kilkis
15:00 EET (UTC+2)	Pavlidis (yellow card)	Report (page 37)	Gamarra (yellow card); Georgeas (yellow card); Maladenis 87'	Stadium: Kilkis Municipal Stadium; Referee: Giannis Bisogiannis (Thessaloniki)

17 January 2002 Second leg	AEK Athens	6–0 (7–0 agg.)	Kilkisiakos	Nea Filadelfeia
19:00 EET (UTC+2)	Chiotis (yellow card); Kostis (yellow card); Konstantinidis (yellow card); Xenidis (yellow card); Folha 12'; Maladenis 45'; Lakis 52', 60'; Ferrugem 56'; Ivić 90' (pen.), (yellow card)	Report (page 39)	Charalampidis (yellow card); Kalpakis (yellow card)	Stadium: Nikos Goumas Stadium; Referee: Vasilis Terovitsas (Aetoloacarnania)

===== Quarter-finals =====
30 January 2002 First leg	AEK Athens	2–1	PAOK	Nea Filadelfeia
19:00 EET (UTC+2)	Kasapis (yellow card); Tsiartas 36'; Maladenis 61'	Report (page 39)	Karadimos (yellow card); Chasiotis (yellow card); Frousos 49', (yellow card)	Stadium: Nikos Goumas Stadium; Attendance: 6,310; Referee: Spyros Papadakos (Laconia)

6 February 2002 Second leg	PAOK	0–4 (1–6 agg.)	AEK Athens	Thessaloniki
19:00 EET (UTC+2)	Zeman (yellow card); Koulakiotis (red card) 27'	Report (page 40)	Zikos (yellow card); Tsiartas 28' (pen.); Lakis 39'; Nikolaidis 48'; Ivić 89'	Stadium: Toumba Stadium; Attendance: 15,109; Referee: Giorgos Tsangarakis (Chania)

===== Semi-finals =====
13 March 2002 First leg	Skoda Xanthi	0–0	AEK Athens	Xanthi
16:30 EET (UTC+2)	Ferrugem (yellow card); Konstantinidis (yellow card)	Report (page 41)	Vallas (yellow card); Zapropoulos (yellow card)	Stadium: A.O. Xanthi Stadium; Referee: Iraklis Tsikinis (Messinia)

10 April 2002 Second leg	AEK Athens	1–0 (a.e.t.) (1–0 agg.)	Skoda Xanthi	Nea Filadelfeia
16:00 EEST (UTC+3)	Zikos (yellow card); Ivić 106', (yellow card)	Report (page 41)		Stadium: Nikos Goumas Stadium; Referee: Pavlos Papilias (Piraeus)

===== Final =====
27 April 2002 Final	AEK Athens	2–1	Olympiacos	Marousi
21:00 EEST (UTC+3)	Tsiartas (penalty missed) 52'; Konstantinidis 52', (yellow card) 60'; Nikolaidis (yellow card) 63'; Xenidis (yellow card) 71'; Zikos (yellow card) 74'; Ivić 82'; Zagorakis (yellow card) 88'; Lakis (yellow card) 89'	Report	Giannakopoulos (yellow card) 26'; Georgiou (yellow card) 51'; Zé Elias (yellow card) 53'; Giovanni 70', (red card) 79'; Amanatidis (yellow card) 73'; Kostoulas (yellow card) 84'	Stadium: Olympic Stadium; Attendance: 45,258; Referee: Thanasis Briakos (Epirus)

=== UEFA Cup ===
==== Qualifying round ====
9 August 2001 First leg	AEK Athens (Greece)	6–0	(Luxembourg) Grevenmacher	Athens, Greece
21:30 EEST (UTC+3)	Tsiartas 39'; Zagorakis 42'; Lakis 54'; Nikolaidis 66', 90'; Konstantinidis 70'	Report	Schneider (yellow card) 52'; Pujade (yellow card) 60'	Stadium: Nikos Goumas Stadium; Attendance: 6,082; Referee: Ghenadie Orlic (Moldova)

23 August 2001 Second leg	Grevenmacher (Luxembourg)	0–2 (0–8 agg.)	(Greece) AEK Athens	Luxembourg City, Luxembourg
21:30 EEST (UTC+3)	Buschmann (yellow card) 79'	Report	Lakis 26'; Konstantinidis 88'	Stadium: Stade Josy Barthel; Attendance: 500; Referee: Brian Lawlor (Wales)

==== First round ====
20 September 2001 First leg	AEK Athens (Greece)	2–0	(Scotland) Hibernian	Athens, Greece
21:15 EEST (UTC+3)	Tsiartas 54' (pen.); Nikolaidis 66'	Report		Stadium: Nikos Goumas Stadium; Attendance: 15,525; Referee: Attila Hanacsek (Hungary)

27 September 2001 Second leg	Hibernian (Scotland)	3–2 (a.e.t.) (3–4 agg.)	(Greece) AEK Athens	Edinburgh, Scotland
21:30 EEST (UTC+3)	Luna 52', 82'; Jack (yellow card) 55'; McManus (yellow card) 71'; Zitelli 114'	Report	Lakis (yellow card) 11'; Ferrugem (yellow card) 42'; Nikolaidis (yellow card) 52'; Tsiartas 92', 105'	Stadium: Easter Road; Attendance: 16,647; Referee: Jacek Granat (Poland)

==== Second round ====
18 October 2001 First leg	Osijek (Croatia)	1–2	(Greece) AEK Athens	Osijek, Croatia
19:00 EEST (UTC+3)	Mitu (yellow card) 13'; Balatinac (yellow card) 14'; Mijatović 71', (yellow card) 78'; Pavličić (red card) 83'	Report	Zagorakis 6'; Ferrugem (yellow card) 67'; Nikolaidis 70'; Zikos (yellow card) 73'	Stadium: Gradski Vrt Stadium; Referee: Eric Romain (Belgium)

30 October 2001 Second leg	AEK Athens (Greece)	3–2 (5–3 agg.)	(Croatia) Osijek	Athens, Greece
19:00 EET (UTC+2)	Lakis 31', (yellow card) 71'; Tsiartas 38'; Georgeas (yellow card) 50'; Nikolaidis (yellow card) 68'; Konstantinidis 79'	Report	Ferrugem 15' (o.g.); Grnja (yellow card) 23'; Mitu 43', (yellow card) 56'; Balatinac (yellow card) 72'	Stadium: Nikos Goumas Stadium; Attendance: 3,446; Referee: Ivan Dobrinov (Bulgaria)

==== Third round ====
22 November 2001 First leg	AEK Athens (Greece)	3–2	(Bulgaria) Litex Lovech	Athens, Greece
21:15 EET (UTC+2)	Tsiartas 10'; Zagorakis 18'; Konstantinidis 23'; Maladenis (yellow card) 66'; Georgeas (yellow card) 73'; Ferrugem (yellow card) 86'	Report	Vutov (yellow card) 10'; Janković 30'; Kirilov (yellow card) 39'; Janković (yellow card) 65'; Răchită 71'; Pătrașcu (yellow card) 75'	Stadium: Nikos Goumas Stadium; Attendance: 12,428; Referee: Wolfgang Stark (Germany)

6 December 2001 Second leg	Litex Lovech (Bulgaria)	1–1 (3–4 agg.)	(Greece) AEK Athens	Lovech, Bulgaria
19:00 EET (UTC+2)	Jelenković (yellow card) 59'; Yurukov 90+2'; Dimitrov (yellow card) 90+2'	Report	Kostenoglou (yellow card) 9'; Gamarra 16', (yellow card) 32'; Zikos (yellow card) 28'	Stadium: Lovech Stadium; Referee: René Temmink (Netherlands)

==== Fourth round ====
21 February 2002 First leg	Internazionale (Italy)	3–1	(Greece) AEK Athens	Milan, Italy
22:00 EET (UTC+2)	J. Zanetti 14'; Kallon 37'; Ventola 56'; Córdoba (yellow card) 60'; C. Zanetti (yellow card) 88'	Report	Zagorakis 8', (yellow card) 16'	Stadium: San Siro; Attendance: 14,030; Referee: Graham Poll (England)

28 February 2002 Second leg	AEK Athens (Greece)	2–2 (3–5 agg.)	(Italy) Internazionale	Athens, Greece
21:30 EET (UTC+2)	Kapsis (yellow card) 20'; Konstantinidis 23'; Nikolaidis 56'	Report	Greško 20'; Ventola 57'; C. Zanetti (yellow card) 90'	Stadium: Nikos Goumas Stadium; Attendance: 14,310; Referee: Karl-Erik Nilsson (Sweden)

== Statistics ==
=== Squad statistics ===
As of 8 May 2002

No.	Pos	Player	Alpha Ethniki		Greek Cup		UEFA Cup		Total	
No.	Pos	Player	Apps	Goals	Apps	Goals	Apps	Goals	Apps	Goals
Goalkeepers
1	GK	(Greece) Ilias Atmatsidis	9	0	8	0	6	0	23	0
22	GK	(Greece) Dionysis Chiotis	17	0	5	0	4	0	26	0
27	GK	(Greece) Sotiris Liberopoulos	0	0	2	0	0	0	2	0
Defenders
3	DF	(Brazil) Ferrugem	24	1	12	3	9	0	45	4
4	DF	(Paraguay) Carlos Gamarra	24	0	8	0	8	1	40	1
5	DF	(Greece) Nikos Kostenoglou	14	0	8	0	4	0	26	0
12	DF	(Greece) Georgios Xenidis	9	0	3	0	1	0	13	0
15	DF	(Madagascar) Éric Rabésandratana	0	0	3	0	2	0	5	0
16	DF	(Greece) Nikolaos Georgeas	21	0	12	0	8	0	41	0
17	DF	(Greece) Michalis Kasapis	19	0	9	0	8	0	36	0
21	DF	(Greece) Vaios Karagiannis	0	0	4	0	0	0	4	0
25	DF	(Canada) Stathis Kappos	1	0	4	0	1	0	6	0
32	DF	(Greece) Michalis Kapsis	6	0	6	0	3	0	15	0
39	DF	(Greece) Grigoris Toskas	0	0	0	0	0	0	0	0
Midfielders
6	MF	(Greece) Theodoros Zagorakis	26	3	9	1	10	4	45	8
7	MF	(Greece) Christos Maladenis	21	6	13	6	6	0	40	12
10	MF	(Greece) Vasilios Tsiartas	24	16	8	6	9	6	41	28
14	MF	(Greece) Akis Zikos	24	1	12	1	9	0	45	2
18	MF	(Greece) Giorgos Passios	0	0	4	0	0	0	4	0
19	MF	(Albania) Bledar Kola	2	0	8	2	4	0	14	2
23	MF	(Greece) Vasilios Lakis	26	8	10	4	10	3	46	15
28	MF	(Bulgaria) Milen Petkov	14	0	9	1	9	0	32	1
33	MF	(Argentina) Fernando Navas	0	0	4	1	2	0	6	1
41	MF	(Greece) Dimitris Karameris	0	0	1	0	0	0	1	0
Forwards
11	FW	(Greece) Demis Nikolaidis	24	17	7	6	8	5	39	28
20	FW	(Greece) Sotiris Konstantinidis	21	4	9	4	10	5	40	13
24	FW	(Greece) Christos Kostis	0	0	4	1	0	0	4	1
26	FW	(Portugal) António Folha	9	0	5	1	1	0	15	1
30	FW	(Federal Republic of Yugoslavia) Ilija Ivić	15	4	5	4	1	0	21	8
Left during Winter Transfer Window
2	DF	(Brazil) Maricá	7	0	4	0	4	0	15	0
9	FW	(Poland) Grzegorz Mielcarski	2	2	0	0	2	0	4	2
29	FW	(Greece) Ilias Anastasakos	0	0	4	0	0	0	4	0
31	FW	(Greece) Georgios Trichias	1	0	4	3	1	0	6	3

=== Goalscorers ===
As of 8 May 2002
The list is sorted by competition order when total goals are equal, then by position and then by squad number.

Rank	No.	Pos.	Player	Alpha Ethniki	Greek Cup	UEFA Cup	Total
1	11	FW	(Greece) Demis Nikolaidis	17	6	5	28
1	10	MF	(Greece) Vasilios Tsiartas	16	6	6	28
3	23	MF	(Greece) Vasilios Lakis	8	4	3	15
4	20	FW	(Greece) Sotiris Konstantinidis	4	4	5	13
5	7	MF	(Greece) Christos Maladenis	6	6	0	12
6	30	FW	(Federal Republic of Yugoslavia) Ilija Ivić	4	4	0	8
6	6	MF	(Greece) Theodoros Zagorakis	3	1	4	8
8	3	DF	(Brazil) Ferrugem	1	3	0	4
9	31	FW	(Greece) Georgios Trichias	0	3	0	3
10	9	FW	(Poland) Grzegorz Mielcarski	2	0	0	2
10	14	MF	(Greece) Akis Zikos	1	1	0	2
10	19	MF	(Albania) Bledar Kola	0	2	0	2
13	33	MF	(Argentina) Fernando Navas	0	1	0	1
13	28	MF	(Bulgaria) Milen Petkov	0	1	0	1
13	24	FW	(Greece) Christos Kostis	0	1	0	1
13	28	MF	(Bulgaria) Milen Petkov	0	1	0	1
13	4	DF	(Paraguay) Carlos Gamarra	0	0	1	1
Own goals				3	1	0	4
Totals				65	45	24	134

=== Hat-tricks ===
Numbers in superscript represent the goals that the player scored.

Player	Against	Result	Date	Competition	Source
(Greece) Vasilios Tsiartas	(Greece) Panserraikos	5–1 (A)	6 August 2001	Greek Cup	
(Greece) Demis Nikolaidis^{5}	(Greece) Nafpaktiakos Asteras	6–3 (A)	29 August 2001	Greek Cup	

=== Assists ===
As of 8 May 2002
The list is sorted by competition order when total assists are equal, then by position and then by squad number.

Rank	No.	Pos.	Player	Alpha Ethniki	Greek Cup	UEFA Cup	Total
1	10	MF	(Greece) Vasilios Tsiartas	14	4	6	24
2	23	MF	(Greece) Vasilios Lakis	3	4	1	8
3	28	MF	(Bulgaria) Milen Petkov	4	0	3	7
4	11	FW	(Greece) Demis Nikolaidis	3	2	1	6
5	6	MF	(Greece) Theodoros Zagorakis	2	0	3	5
6	17	DF	(Greece) Michalis Kasapis	3	1	0	4
6	20	FW	(Greece) Sotiris Konstantinidis	2	1	1	4
6	7	MF	(Greece) Christos Maladenis	0	3	1	4
9	30	FW	(Federal Republic of Yugoslavia) Ilija Ivić	3	0	0	3
9	2	DF	(Brazil) Maricá	0	2	1	3
11	3	DF	(Brazil) Ferrugem	1	1	0	2
11	4	DF	(Paraguay) Carlos Gamarra	1	1	0	2
13	16	DF	(Greece) Nikolaos Georgeas	1	0	0	1
13	15	DF	(Madagascar) Éric Rabésandratana	0	1	0	1
13	14	MF	(Greece) Akis Zikos	0	1	0	1
13	33	MF	(Argentina) Fernando Navas	0	1	0	1
13	19	MF	(Albania) Bledar Kola	0	1	0	1
13	9	FW	(Poland) Grzegorz Mielcarski	0	0	1	1
Totals				37	23	18	78

=== Clean sheets ===
As of 8 May 2002
The list is sorted by competition order when total clean sheets are equal and then by squad number. Clean sheets in games where both goalkeepers participated are awarded to the goalkeeper who started the game. Goalkeepers with no appearances are not included.

Rank	No.	Player	Alpha Ethniki	Greek Cup	UEFA Cup	Total
1	22	(Greece) Dionysis Chiotis	9	3	0	12
1	1	(Greece) Ilias Atmatsidis	3	6	3	12
2	27	(Greece) Sotiris Liberopoulos	0	1	0	1
Totals			12	10	3	25

=== Disciplinary record ===
As of 8 May 2002

N	P	Nat.	Name	Alpha Ethniki			Greek Cup			UEFA Cup			Total			Notes
N	P	Nat.	Name	Yellow card	Second yellow card	Red card	Yellow card	Second yellow card	Red card	Yellow card	Second yellow card	Red card	Yellow card	Second yellow card	Red card	Notes
Goalkeepers
1	GK	(Greece)	Ilias Atmatsidis	1									1			
22	GK	(Greece)	Dionysis Chiotis	1			1						2			
27	GK	(Greece)	Sotiris Liberopoulos													
Defenders
3	DF	(Brazil)	Ferrugem	4			2			2			8			
4	DF	(Paraguay)	Carlos Gamarra				1			1			2			
5	DF	(Greece)	Nikos Kostenoglou	3			1			1			5			
12	DF	(Greece)	Georgios Xenidis	1			2						3			
15	DF	(Madagascar)	Éric Rabésandratana													
16	DF	(Greece)	Nikolaos Georgeas	4			2			2			8			
17	DF	(Greece)	Michalis Kasapis	3			1						4			
21	DF	(Greece)	Vaios Karagiannis													
25	DF	(Canada)	Stathis Kappos													
32	DF	(Greece)	Michalis Kapsis							1			1			
39	DF	(Greece)	Grigoris Toskas													
Midfielders
6	MF	(Greece)	Theodoros Zagorakis	2			2			1			5			
7	MF	(Greece)	Christos Maladenis							1			1			
10	MF	(Greece)	Vasilios Tsiartas	1									1			
14	MF	(Greece)	Akis Zikos	5			2			2			9			
18	MF	(Greece)	Giorgos Passios				1						1			
19	MF	(Albania)	Bledar Kola													
23	MF	(Greece)	Vasilios Lakis	2			1			2			5			
28	MF	(Bulgaria)	Milen Petkov	2			1						3			
33	MF	(Argentina)	Fernando Navas													
41	MF	(Greece)	Dimitris Karameris													
Forwards
11	FW	(Greece)	Demis Nikolaidis	2			1			2			5			
20	FW	(Greece)	Sotiris Konstantinidis	2			2						4			
24	FW	(Greece)	Christos Kostis				1						1			
26	FW	(Portugal)	António Folha	1									1			
30	FW	(Federal Republic of Yugoslavia)	Ilija Ivić	1			2						3			
Left during Winter Transfer window
2	DF	(Brazil)	Maricá													
9	DF	(Poland)	Grzegorz Mielcarski													
29	FW	(Greece)	Ilias Anastasakos				1						1			
31	FW	(Greece)	Georgios Trichias													

=== Starting 11 ===
This section presents the most frequently used formation along with the players with the most starts across all competitions.

N.	Formation	Matchday(s)
44	4–2–3–1	1–10, 12–23, 25–30
5	4–4–2	11, 24
1	4–3–3

No.	Nat.	Player	Pos.
22	(Greece)	Dionysis Chiotis	GK
3	(Brazil)	Ferrugem	RCB
4	(Paraguay)	Carlos Gamarra	LCB
16	(Greece)	Nikolaos Georgeas	RB
17	(Greece)	Michalis Kasapis	LB
14	(Greece)	Akis Zikos	DM
6	(Greece)	Theodoros Zagorakis (C)	CM
23	(Greece)	Vasilios Lakis	RM
20	(Greece)	Sotiris Konstantinidis	LM
10	(Greece)	Vasilios Tsiartas	AM
11	(Greece)	Demis Nikolaidis	CF

Last updated: 2002-05-08

== Awards ==
Player	Pos.	Award	Source
(Greece) Demis Nikolaidis	FW	Greek Player of the Season	
(Portugal) Fernando Santos	—	Manager of the Season	
