= 1998–99 Iraklis F.C. season =

G.S. Iraklis Thessalonikis 1998–99 association football season

Iraklis
1998–99 season
- President: Petros Theodoridis
- Manager: Kiril Dojčinovski (until 13 October 1998); Mats Jingblad (since 13 October 1998)
- Stadium: Kaftanzoglio Stadium
- Alpha Ethniki: 9th
- Greek Cup: Semi-final
- UEFA Intertoto Cup: Second round
- Top goalscorer: League: Michalis Konstantinou (9); All: Michalis Konstantinou (10)

The 1999–2000 season was Iraklis' 18th straight season on the Greek first tier. Managing a lower league finish than the previous season, their biggest feat was reaching the domestic cup semi-final.

== Players ==
=== Squad ===
No.	Pos	Nat	Player	Total		Alpha Ethniki		Intertoto Cup	
No.	Pos	Nat	Player	Apps	Goals	Apps	Goals	Apps	Goals
1	GK	(Greece) GRE	Ilias Stogiannis	19	0	19	0	0	0
4	DF	(Greece) GRE	Giorgos Kyriazis	22	4	22	4	0	0
4	DF	(North Macedonia) MKD	Sašo Karadzov	20	1	18	0	2	1
5	DF	(Greece) GRE	Lazaros Semos	26	5	24	5	2	0
5	DF	(Greece) GRE	Stathis Tavlaridis	13	1	13	1	0	0
6	DF	(Greece) GRE	Georgios Xenidis	24	1	22	1	2	0
7	MF	(Greece) GRE	Giorgos Kostis	23	1	21	0	2	1
8	MF	(Greece) GRE	Lefteris Velentzas	29	4	27	4	2	0
9	FW	(Greece) GRE	Ilias Sapanis	22	2	21	2	1	0
10	FW	(Federal Republic of Yugoslavia) YUG	Ivan Jovanović	23	4	21	4	2	0
11	MF	(Greece) GRE	Ieroklis Stoltidis	31	6	30	6	1	0
11	MF	(Cyprus) CYP	Marios Christodoulou	29	6	27	6	2	0
14	DF	(Democratic Republic of the Congo) COD	Jean Kasimba	14	0	14	0	0	0
14	MF	(Greece) GRE	Athanasios Moutsios	1	0	1	0	0	0
15	MF	(Republic of the Congo) CGO	Djogani Kinonda	17	0	17	0	0	0
16	DF	(Greece) GRE	Michail Berneanou	12	0	12	0	0	0
17	MF	(Greece) GRE	Sotiris Konstantinidis	14	1	14	1	0	0
18	DF	(Greece) GRE	Zafiris Dimitriadis	3	0	1	0	2	0
19	MF	(Greece) GRE	Savvas Kofidis	33	1	31	1	2	0
19	FW	(Cyprus) CYP	Michalis Konstantinou	33	10	31	9	2	1
22	FW	(Ghana) GHA	Ebenezer Hagan	31	8	31	8	0	0
25	DF	(Republic of the Congo) CGO	Momongo Lokenze	5	0	5	0	0	0
27	MF	(Sweden) SWE	Babis Stefanidis	6	1	6	1	0	0
30	GK	(Greece) GRE	Christos Karkamanis	17	0	15	0	2	0
31	DF	(Greece) GRE	Stavros Tziortziopoulos	11	1	11	1	0	0
?	FW	(Greece) GRE	Zisis Ziagas	1	0	0	0	1	0
?	MF	(Greece) GRE	Giorgos Lanaris	1	0	0	0	1	0
?	FW	(Sweden) SWE	Robert Andersson	7	0	7	0	0	0
?	GK	(Greece) GRE	Panagiotis Dilberis	1	0	1	0	0	0

=== Players who left during the season ===
No.	Pos	Nat	Player	Total		Alpha Ethniki		Intertoto Cup	
No.	Pos	Nat	Player	Apps	Goals	Apps	Goals	Apps	Goals
29	DF	(Greece) GRE	Avraam Xanthopoulos	1	0	0	0	1	0

== Managers ==
- Kiril Dojčinovski: 1 July 1998 – 13 October 1998
- Mats Jingblad: 13 October 1998 – 30 June 1999

== Alpha Ethniki ==
=== League table ===
Pos	Team	Pld	W	D	L	GF	GA	GD	Pts
7	Skoda Xanthi	34	16	8	10	44	33	+11	56
8	OFI	34	16	3	15	50	44	+6	51
9	Iraklis	34	13	8	13	54	45	+9	47
10	Kavala	34	12	6	16	46	62	−16	42
11	Ethnikos Asteras	34	11	7	16	40	58	−18	40

Source: Galanis Sports Data
Rules for classification: 1st points; 2nd head-to-head points; 3rd head-to-head goal difference; 4th decision match.

==== Results summary ====
Overall								Home						Away					
Pld	W	D	L	GF	GA	GD	Pts	W	D	L	GF	GA	GD	W	D	L	GF	GA	GD
34	13	8	13	54	45	+9	47	9	4	4	33	20	+13	4	4	9	21	25	−4

Last updated: 30 May 1999.
Source: Competitive matches

==== Results by round ====
Round	1	2	3	4	5	6	7	8	9	10	11	12	13	14	15	16	17	18	19	20	21	22	23	24	25	26	27	28	29	30	31	32	33	34
Ground	A	H	A	A	H	A	H	A	H	A	H	H	A	H	A	H	A	H	A	H	H	A	H	A	H	A	H	A	A	H	A	H	A	H
Result	W	W	L	D	D	L	W	L	D	L	W	W	D	L	D	W	D	W	L	W	L	L	W	W	W	L	D	W	L	D	L	L	W	L
Position	4	2	6	6	8	9	7	8	10	12	12	8	10	10	10	8	9	8	9	9	9	9	8	8	8	9	9	9	9	9	9	9	9	9

Source: Competitive matches
A = Away; H = Home; W = Win; D = Draw; L = Loss

=== Greek Cup ===
==== First round ====
11 November 1998	Iraklis	4–1	Nafpaktiakos Asteras	Thessaloniki
13:00 EET	I. Sapanis 7', 55'; Jovanović 65'; Dimitriadis 72'	Report (page 27)	Kepentzis 59'	Stadium: Kaftanzoglio Stadium

==== Second round ====
17 December 1998	Ialysos	2–2 (a.e.t.) (2–4 p)	Iraklis	Ialysos
13:00 EET	P. Kyparissis 7'; Kantimoiris 118'	Report (page 30)	Christodoulou 29', 107'	Stadium: Municipal Stadium Ekonomideio

==== Round of 16 ====
13 January 1999	Poseidon Michaniona	1–2	Iraklis	Thessaloniki
13:00 EET	Prittas 73'	Report (page 34)	Konstantinou 49' (pen.); Stoltidis 90'	Stadium: Poseidon Nea Michaniona Stadium

==== Quarter-finals ====
27 January 1999 First leg	ILTEX Lykoi	1–3	Iraklis	Thessaloniki
15:15 EET	Pantelis 12'	Report (pages 36-37)	Semos 18'; Andersson 84'; Ignatiadis 90+2' (o.g.)	Stadium: Stelios Iliadis Stadium; Attendance: 736; Referee: Kostas Vallianos (Aetoloacarnania)

17 February 1999 Second leg	Iraklis	1–2 (4–3 agg.)	ILTEX Lykoi	Thessaloniki
18:00 EET	Xenidis 49'	Report (page 37)	Klokidis 27'; Katikaridis 90'	Stadium: Kaftanzoglio Stadium; Attendance: 540; Referee: Christos Mittas (Thessaloniki)

==== Semi-finals ====
7 April 1999 First leg	Olympiacos	4–0	Iraklis	Marousi
16:30 EEST	Anatolakis 23'; Mavrogenidis 66'; Xenidis 70' (o.g.); Gogić 86'	Report (pages 40-41)		Stadium: Olympic Stadium; Attendance: 5,864; Referee: Dimitris Kalivas (Boeotia)

11 April 1999 Second leg	Iraklis	1–1 (1–5 agg.)	Olympiacos	Thessaloniki
19:45 EEST	Tavlaridis 47'	Report (page 41)	Gogić 29'	Stadium: Kaftanzoglio Stadium; Attendance: 1,064; Referee: Giorgos Borovilos (Arcadia)

== UEFA Intertoto Cup ==
=== Second round ===
5 July 1998 First leg	Iraklis (Greece)	3–1	(Romania) Naţional București	Thessaloniki, Greece
	Karadžov 2'; Konstantinou 71'; Kostis 88'	Report	Pogăcean 43'	Stadium: Kaftanzoglio Stadium; Attendance: 1,217; Referee: Dieter Schoch (Switzerland)

11 July 1998 Second leg	Naţional București (Romania)	3–0 (4–3 agg.)	(Greece) Iraklis	Bucharest, Romania
	Pigulea 55'; Savu 64'; Liţă 90'	Report		Stadium: Stadionul Cotroceni; Attendance: 2,000; Referee: Frank De Bleeckere (Belgium)

== See also ==
- Iraklis F.C. (Thessaloniki)
- List of Iraklis Thessaloniki F.C. players
- List of Iraklis F.C. seasons
- G.S. Iraklis Thessaloniki
- G.S. Iraklis Thessaloniki (men's basketball)
- Iraklis B.C. in international competitions
- G.S. Iraklis Thessaloniki (women's basketball)
- Ivanofeio Sports Arena
- G.S. Iraklis Thessaloniki (men's volleyball)
- G.S. Iraklis Thessaloniki (women's volleyball)
- G.S. Iraklis Thessaloniki (water polo)
- G.S. Iraklis Thessaloniki (rugby)
