= 2002 Greek Football Cup final =

2002 Greek Cup final
- Event: 2001–02 Greek Football Cup
AEK Athens	Olympiacos
2	1
- Date: 27 April 2002
- Venue: Olympic Stadium, Marousi, Athens
- Man of the Match: Dionysis Chiotis (AEK Athens)
- Referee: Thanasis Briakos (Epirus)
- Attendance: 45,258
- Weather: Fair; 15 °C (59 °F); 82% humidity

The 2002 Greek Cup final was the 58th final of the Greek Cup. The match took place on 27 April 2002 at Olympic Stadium. The contesting teams were AEK Athens and Olympiacos. It was AEK Athens' seventeenth Greek Cup final in their 78 years of existence and Olympiacos' twenty-ninth Greek Cup final and second consecutive in their 77-year history. For the 5th and last time, the President of the Republic, Konstantinos Stephanopoulos, honored the final with his presence, awarding the trophy to the players of the winning team.

== Venue ==
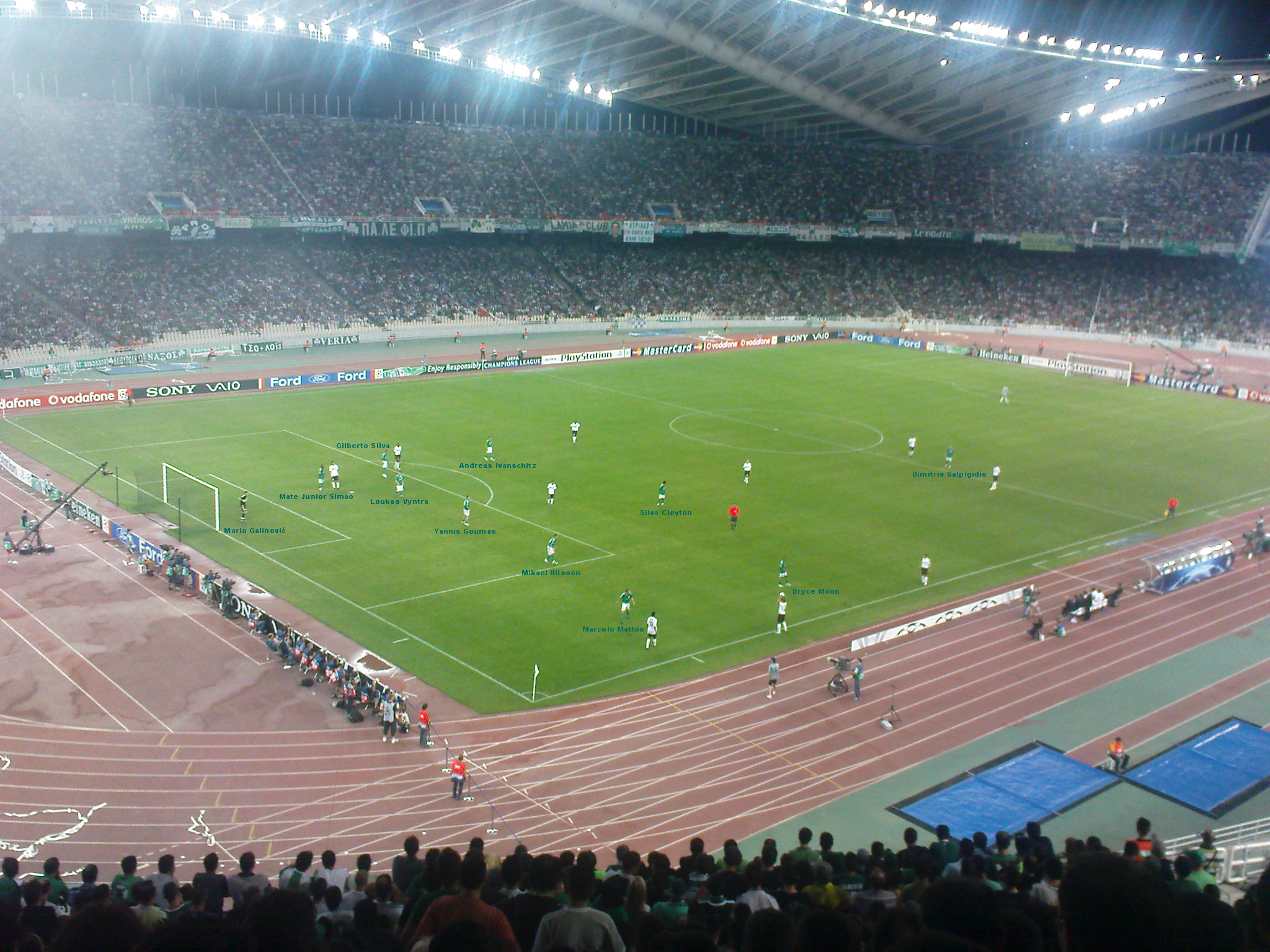
Athens Olympic Stadium.

This was the fifteenth Greek Cup final held at the Athens Olympic Stadium, after the 1983, 1984, 1985, 1986, 1987, 1988, 1989, 1990, 1993, 1994, 1995, 1996, 1999 and 2000 finals.

The Athens Olympic Stadium was built in 1982. The stadium is used as a venue for Olympiacos and was used for Panathinaikos, AEK Athens and Greece on various occasions. Its current capacity is 80,000 and hosted two European Cup/UEFA Champions League finals in 1983 and 1994, a UEFA Cup Winners' Cup final in 1987 and the 1991 Mediterranean Games.

== Background ==
AEK Athens had reached the Greek Cup final sixteen times, winning ten of them. The last time that they played in a final was in 2000, where they had won against Ionikos by 3–0.

Olympiacos had reached the Greek Cup final twenty eight times, winning twenty of them. The last time that they had won the Cup was in 1999 (2–0 against Panathinaikos). The last time that had played in a final was in 2001, where they had lost to PAOK by 4–2.

The two teams had met each other in a Cup final two times in the 1953 and 1956 finals.

== Route to the final ==
AEK Athens				Round	Olympiacos			
Opponent	Result			Group stage	Opponent	Result		
Panserraikos	5–1 (A)			Matchday 1	Kalamata	3–1 (A)		
Nafpaktiakos Asteras	6–3 (A)			Matchday 2	AEL	1–0 (A)		
Egaleo	2–0 (H)			Matchday 3	Agios Nikolaos	1–0 (H)		
Panserraikos	5–0 (H)			Matchday 4	Kalamata	10–0 (H)		
Nafpaktiakos Asteras	4–0 (H)			Matchday 5	AEL	5–3 (H)		
Egaleo	3–3 (A)			Matchday 6	Agios Nikolaos	6–1 (A)		
Group 1 winners: Pos / Team / Pld / Pts; 1 / AEK Athens / 6 / 16; 2 / Egaleo / 6 / 9; 3 / Panserraikos / 6 / 8; 4 / Nafpaktiakos Asteras / 6 / 0; Source: epo.gr				Final standings	Group 6 winners: Pos / Team / Pld / Pts; 1 / Olympiacos / 6 / 18; 2 / Agios Nikolaos / 6 / 9; 3 / AEL / 6 / 6; 4 / Kalamata / 6 / 3; Source: epo.gr			
Opponent	Agg.	1st leg	2nd leg	Knockout phase	Opponent	Agg.	1st leg	2nd leg
Agios Nikolaos	4–0	3–0 (H)	1–0 (A)	Second round	Bye			
Kilkisiakos	7–0	1–0 (A)	6–0 (H)	Round of 16	Egaleo	8–1	5–1 (H)	3–0 (A)
PAOK	6–1	2–1 (H)	4–0 (A)	Quarter-finals	Kallithea	7–0	3–0 (H)	4–0 (A)
Skoda Xanthi	1–0	0–0 (A)	1–0 (a.e.t.) (H)	Semi-finals	Iraklis	6–2	3–2 (H)	3–0 (A)

== Match ==
=== Details ===
27 April 2002
21:00 EEST

AEK Athens	2–1	Olympiacos
Konstantinidis 52'; Ivić 82'	Report	Giovanni 70'

Olympic Stadium, Marousi
Attendance: 45,258
Referee: Thanasis Briakos (Epirus)

AEK Athens	Olympiacos

GK	22	(Greece) Dionysis Chiotis
RB	16	(Greece) Nikolaos Georgeas
CB	4	(Paraguay) Carlos Gamarra
CB	32	(Greece) Michalis Kapsis
LB	17	(Greece) Michalis Kasapis		(substituted off) 29'
DM	14	(Greece) Akis Zikos	(yellow card) 74'
DM	6	(Greece) Theodoros Zagorakis (c)	(yellow card) 88'
RM	23	(Greece) Vasilios Lakis	(yellow card) 89'
LM	20	(Greece) Sotiris Konstantinidis	(yellow card) 60'	(substituted off) 81'
AM	10	(Greece) Vasilios Tsiartas
CF	11	(Greece) Demis Nikolaidis	(yellow card) 62'
Substitutes:
GK	27	(Greece) Sotiris Liberopoulos
DF	3	(Brazil) Ferrugem
DF	5	(Greece) Nikos Kostenoglou
DF	12	(Greece) Georgios Xenidis	(yellow card) 71'	(substituted on) 29'
MF	28	(Bulgaria) Milen Petkov
FW	26	(Portugal) António Folha
FW	30	(Federal Republic of Yugoslavia) Ilija Ivić		(substituted on) 81'
Manager:
(Portugal) Fernando Santos

GK	15	(Greece) Angelos Georgiou	(yellow card) 51'
RB	2	(Greece) Christos Patsatzoglou
CB	5	(Greece) Georgios Amanatidis	(yellow card) 73'
CB	19	(Greece) Athanasios Kostoulas	(yellow card) 84'	(substituted off) 85'
LB	33	(Greece) Stylianos Venetidis
DM	8	(France) Christian Karembeu		(substituted off) 44'
CM	20	(Sweden) Pär Zetterberg		(substituted off) 85'
RM	7	(Greece) Stelios Giannakopoulos	(yellow card) 26'
LM	11	(Federal Republic of Yugoslavia) Predrag Đorđević
SS	10	(Brazil) Giovanni	(red card) 79'
CF	30	(Greece) Alexis Alexandris (c)
Substitutes:
GK	34	(Greece) Kleopas Giannou
DF	14	(Greece) Dimitrios Mavrogenidis
DF	32	(Greece) Georgios Anatolakis
MF	13	(Brazil) Zé Elias	(yellow card) 54'	(substituted on) 44'
MF	21	(Greece) Andreas Niniadis		(substituted on) 85'
FW	17	(Ghana) Peter Ofori-Quaye		(substituted on) 85'
FW	99	(Uruguay) Gabriel Álvez
Manager:
(Greece) Takis Lemonis

Man of the Match:
(Greece) Dionysis Chiotis (AEK Athens)

Assistant referees:
Spyros Tomaras (Aetoloacarnania)
Giorgos Tsoukas (Arcadia)

Match rules

- 90 minutes
- 30 minutes of extra time if necessary
- Penalty shootout if scores still level
- Seven named substitutes
- Maximum of three substitutions

== See also ==
- 2001–02 Greek Football Cup
