= Ilias (name) =

"Ilias Greek: Ηλίας is the Greek version of the name of the Prophet Elijah. It is also commonly spelled Elias. Some interpretations suggest that the name 'Ilias' may resonate with the Greek word for 'sun' (Ήλιος, Helios), symbolizing light and brightness in Greek cultural themes."

Notable people with the name include:

- Ilias Akhomach (born 2004), Moroccan footballer
- Ilias Ali (Bangladeshi politician) (born 1961), Bangladeshi politician
- Ilias Anastasakos (born 1978), Greek footballer
- Ilias Atmatsidis (born 1969), Greek former football goalkeeper
- Ilias Belharouak, Moroccan-American chemist and scientist
- Iliaș Colceag (fl. before 1710–1743), Moldavian mercenary and military commander in the Ottoman and Russian Empire
- Ilias Gorchkhanov (1967–2005), the first leader of the Ingush Jamaat
- Ilias Haddad (born 1989 in Nador), Moroccan footballer
- Ilias Hatzipavlis (born 24 May 1949), a Greek sailor
- Ilias Iliadis (footballer) (born 2001), Canadian-Greek footballer
- Ilias Iliadis (judoka) (born 1986), Georgian-born judoka competing for Greece
- Ilias Iliou (1904–1985), member of the Greek Parliament and leader of the United Democratic Left
- Ilias Ioannou (born 1979), footballer
- Ilias Kafetzis, Greek athlete who competed at the 1896 Summer Olympics
- Ilias Kotsios (born 1977), Greek footballer
- Ilias Kyriakidis (born 1985), Greek footballer
- Ilias Kyriazis (born 1978), Greek comic book writer and artist
- Ilias Lalaounis (1920–2013), Greek jewelry designer
- Ilias Louka (born 1974), retired Cypriot shot putter
- Ilias Manikas (born 1980), football striker, currently playing for Rodos F.C.
- Ilias Melkas (Greek: Ηλίας Μέλκας, born 1989), an Albanian footballer for Iraklis Thessaloniki F.C.
- Ilias Mihalopoulos (born 1985), Greek footballer
- Ilias Polatidis (1966–2016), a member of the Popular Orthodox Rally
- Ilias Poursanidis (born 1972), Greek former footballer
- Ilias Rosidis (1927–2019), Greek footballer
- Ilias Solakis (born 1974), Greek footballer
- Ilias Stogiannis (born 1976), Greek former football goalkeeper
- Ilias Tsirimokos (1907–1968), Greek politician
- Ilias Venezis (1904–1973), Greek novelist
- Ilias Vrioni (1882–1932), Albanian politician, Prime Minister of Albania three times
- Ilias Yfantis (born 1936), Greek former footballer
- Ilias Zeytulaev (born 1984), Uzbek footballer
- Ilias Zouros (born 1966), Greek basketball coach
