= Birgit Esser =

German chemist

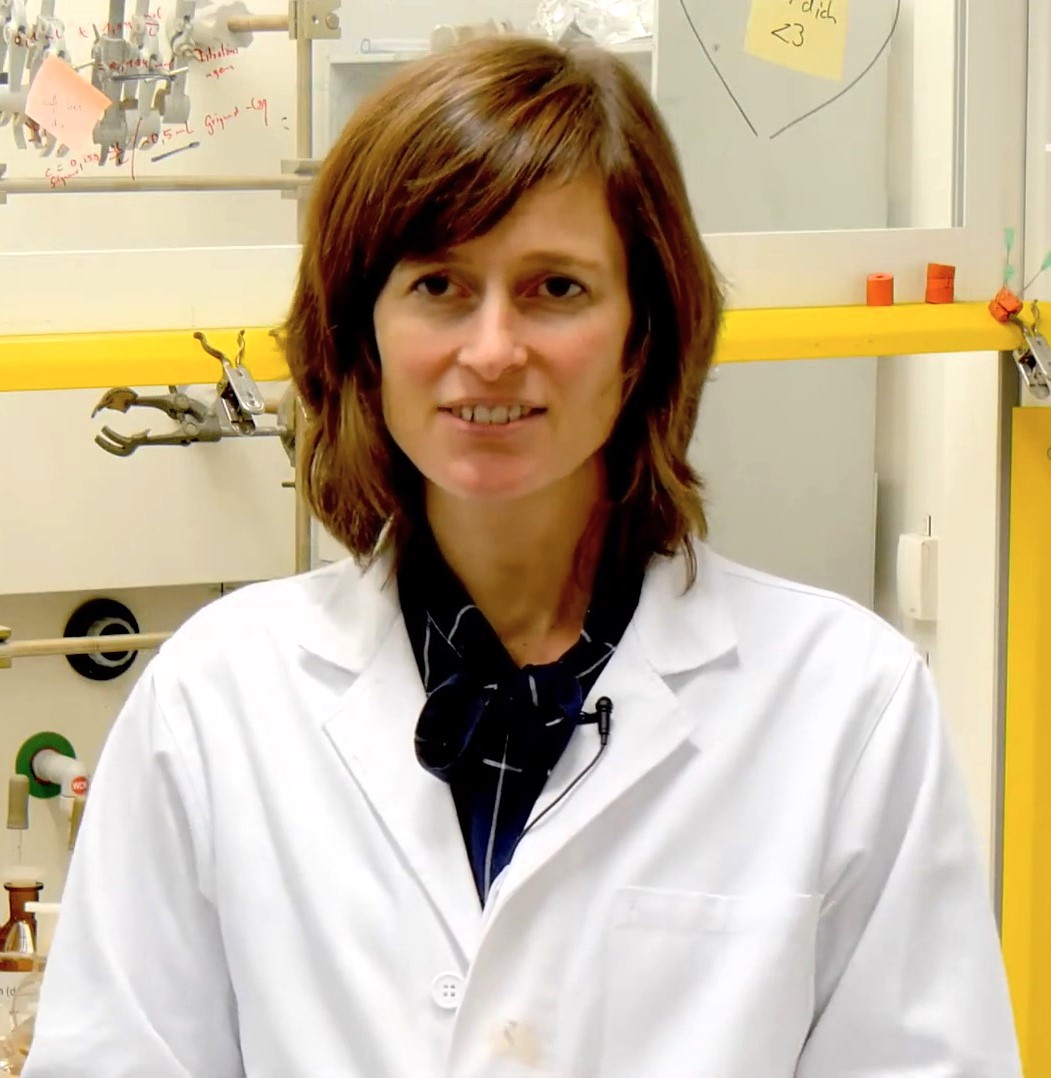
- Esser at the University of Freiburg in 2019
- Education: University of Heidelberg
- Scientific career
- Workplaces: University of Ulm; University of Freiburg; University of Bonn; Massachusetts Institute of Technology
- Thesis: (6.8)3-Cyclacen Synthese eines neuartigen cyclischen π-Systems (2008)

Birgit Esser is a German chemist who is a professor of Organic Chemistry at the University of Ulm. Her research considers molecular electronics and hoop-shaped π-systems. In 2023, Esser was awarded a European Research Council Consolidator Grant focused on the development of organic materials for batteries.

== Early life and education ==
Esser was born and raised in Heidelberg. She studied chemistry at Heidelberg University, where she became interested in organic synthesis. She spent 2002 as an Erasmus scholar at the University of Bristol, then returned to Germany to complete her doctoral research, where she worked alongside Rolf Gleiter. Her doctorate explored a cyclic π system. Her doctoral research was supported by a Studienstiftung fellowship. After graduating, she was awarded a German National Academy of Sciences Leopoldina fellowship and moved to Massachusetts Institute of Technology to work alongside Timothy M. Swager, where she developed ethylene gas sensors based on carbon nanotubes and conjugated polymers.

== Research and career ==
In 2012, Esser returned to Germany, which she established her own research group at the University of Bonn. She was made a Emmy Noether Program Group Leader, with a focus on the development of organic electronic materials for batteries and optoelectronics. She believes that redox-active organic electronic materials hold promise for sustainable, non-toxic battery electrodes. Typically these materials have poor porosity, which makes it difficult for ions to undergo redox processes.

Esser is also interested in the development of cyclic conjugated molecules called nanohoops. These nanohoops have radial π-conjugation, which affords them unique optical and electronic properties. In 2023, she was awarded a European Research Council Consolidator Grant for Next-Generation Batteries. She believes that her conjugated hoop shaped molecules could be used to improve the porosity of organic electronic electrode materials, as well as increasing the capacity and making them lighter.

== Selected publications ==
- Esser, Birgit; Jan M Schnorr; Swager, Timothy M. (2012). "Selective detection of ethylene gas using carbon nanotube-based devices: utility in determination of fruit ripeness". Angewandte Chemie International Edition. 51 (23): 5752–5756. doi:10.1002/anie.201201042. PMID 22517760. Wikidata Q83937249.
- Esser, Birgit; Franck Dolhem; Matthieu Becuwe; Philippe Poizot; Alexandru Vlad; Daniel Brandell (2021). "A perspective on organic electrode materials and technologies for next generation batteries". Journal of Power Sources. 482 228814. doi:10.1016/j.jpowsour.2020.228814. Wikidata Q120462030.
- Martin E Speer; Kolek, Martin; Jean Jacques Jassoy; Jennifer Heine; Martin Winter; Peter M Bieker; Esser, Birgit (2015). "Thianthrene-functionalized polynorbornenes as high-voltage materials for organic cathode-based dual-ion batteries". ChemComm. 51 (83): 15261–15264. doi:10.1039/c5cc04932f. PMID 26235336. Wikidata Q85700462.
