= Konstantinos Papadopoulos =

Konstantinos Papadopoulos may refer to:

- Konstantinos Papadopoulos (footballer, born 2000)
- Konstantinos Papadopoulos (footballer, born 1976)
