= Ilias Belharouak =

Moroccan-American scientist

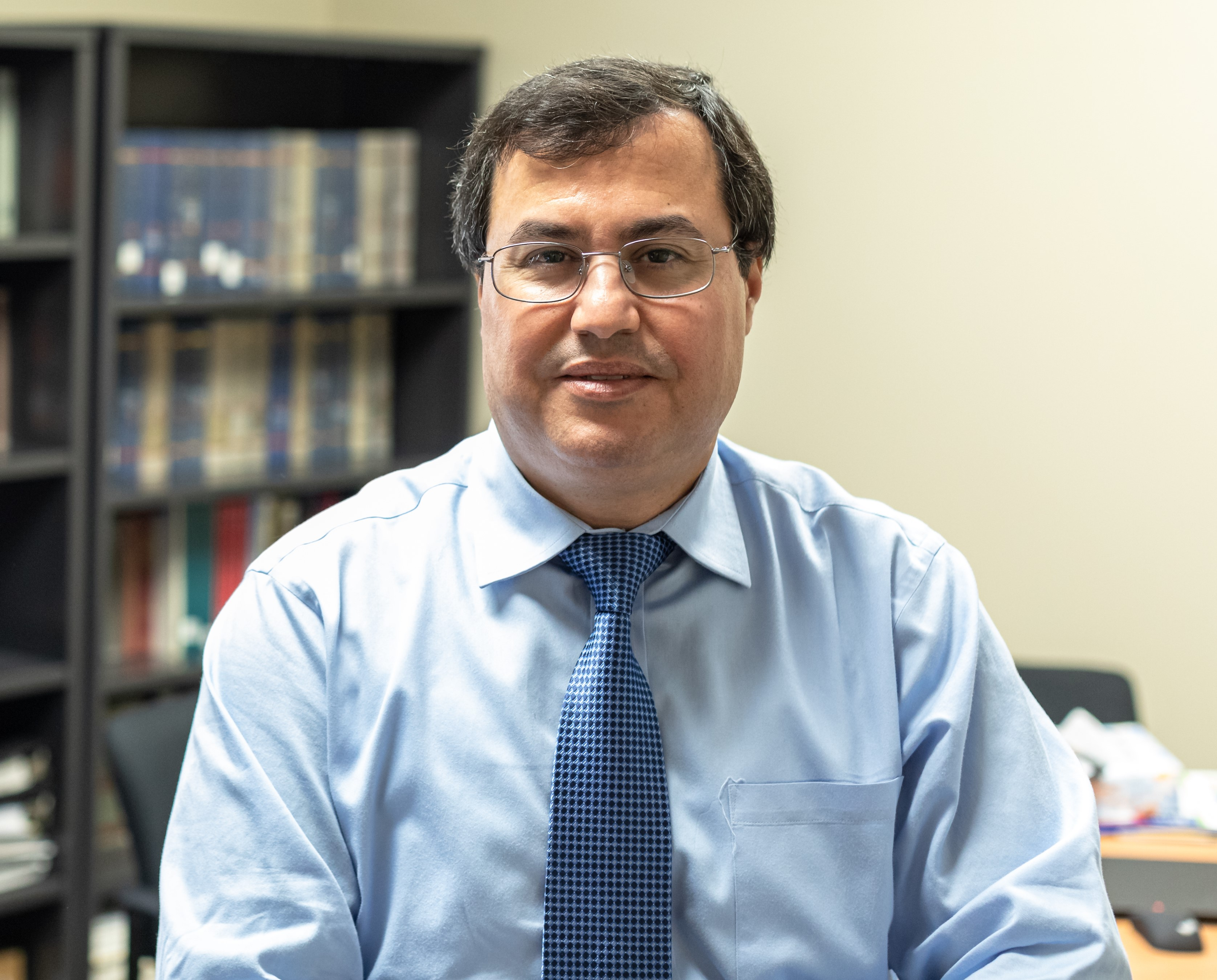
- Education: Bordeaux 1 University, France Cadi Ayyad University, Morocco
- Scientific career
- Fields: Energy Storage, Battery R&D
- Workplaces: Oak Ridge National Laboratory, USA Qatar Foundation, Qatar Argonne National Laboratory, USA
- Website: https://www.ornl.gov/staff-profile/ilias-belharouak

Ilias Belharouak is a Moroccan-American chemist and scientist. He is a corporate fellow who heads the electrification section at Oak Ridge National Laboratory (ORNL) in Oak Ridge, Tennessee, USA. He has contributed to research in high-power density and high-energy density energy storage materials for use in lithium-ion, sodium-ion, solid-state batteries and lithium-sulfur batteries.

At ORNL, Belharouak leads multidisciplinary US Department of Energy sponsored R&D programs focusing on battery energy storage and advanced manufacturing. He has received six R&D 100 Awards and is Editor in Chief for the Journal of Power Sources.

== Education ==
Belharouak received his bachelor's degree in Inorganic Chemistry from Cadi Ayyad University, Marrakech, Morocco in 1995. He obtained a master's degree in Materials Science in 1996 and a doctoral degree in 1999 from Bordeaux 1 University, France.

== Recognition ==
- 2022 Corporate Fellow by UT-Battelle/Oak Ridge National Laboratory
- 2022 R&D 100 Award by R&D Magazine for SolidPAC
- 2021 US Federal Laboratory Consortium Award for building cobalt-free battery technologies licensed to Sparkz
- 2020 R&D 100 Award by R&D Magazine for Cobalt-free Li-ion battery cathode material
- 2019 Editor for the Special Issue in Journal of Power Sources in celebration of the 2019 Nobel Prize in Chemistry
- 2012 R&D 100 Award by R&D Magazine for High-Energy Concentration-Gradient Cathode Material for Plug-in Hybrids and All-Electric Vehicles
- 2008 R&D 100 Award by R&D Magazine for Advanced High-Power Battery for hybrid electric vehicles
- 2005 R&D 100 Award by R&D Magazine for Bion microsimulator
