= Zafiris Dimitriadis =

Greek footballer

Personal information
- Date of birth: 26 October 1975 (age 51)
- Height: 1.78 m (5 ft 10 in)
- Position: Defender

Senior career*
Years	Team	Apps	(Gls)
1998–1999	Iraklis		
1999–2000	Pierikos		
2002–2003	Agrotikos Asteras		
- * Club domestic league appearances and goals

Zafiris Dimitriadis (Greek: Ζαφίρης Δημητριάδης; born 26 October 1975) is a retired Greek football defender.
