= Aristidis Magafinis =

Greek footballer

Personal information
- Date of birth: 4 September 1973 (age 53)
- Position: Forward

Senior career*
Years	Team	Apps	(Gls)
–1997	Kavala		
1997–2003	Akratitos		
2003	Olympiakos Nicosia		
2003–2006	Lamia		
2006–2007	Doxa Drama		
2007	Leonidio		
2007–2008	Orfeas Eleftheroupoli		
- * Club domestic league appearances and goals

Aristidis Magafinis (Greek: Αριστείδης Μαγκαφίνης; born 4 September 1973) is a retired Greek football striker from Prinos, Thassos.
