= Grzegorz Mielcarski =

Polish footballer (born 1971)

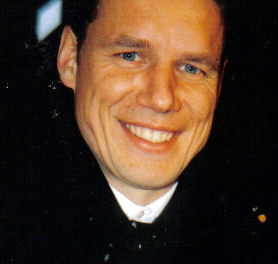
- Mielcarski in 2007

Personal information
- Date of birth: 19 March 1971 (age 55)
- Place of birth: Chełmno, Poland
- Height: 1.88 m (6 ft 2 in)
- Position: Forward

Senior career*
Years	Team	Apps	(Gls)
1986–1987	Orzeł Chełmno		
1987–1989	Polonia Bydgoszcz		
1989–1992	Olimpia Poznań	88	(28)
1993	Servette	6	(1)
1993–1994	Górnik Zabrze	23	(8)
1994	Olimpia Poznań	11	(4)
1994–1995	Widzew Łódź	17	(7)
1995–1999	Porto	41	(8)
1999–2000	Salamanca	19	(2)
2000–2001	Pogoń Szczecin	20	(9)
2001–2002	AEK Athens	2	(2)
2002–2003	Amica Wronki	9	(2)

International career
- Poland Olympic
1991–1998	Poland	10	(1)

Managerial career
- 2023: Poland (assistant)
Medal record
Representing Poland
Men's football
Olympic Games
Silver medal – second place	1992 Barcelona	Team
- * Club domestic league appearances and goals

Grzegorz Mielcarski (born 19 March 1971) is a Polish former professional footballer who played as a forward. Mielcarski most recently served as the assistant coach of the Poland national team.

== Club career ==
Born in Chełmno, Mielcarski began his career in 1986 at Orzeł Chełmno. In 1987 he moved to Polonia Bydgoszcz, where he played for a season. Afterwards he signed for Olimpia Poznań for two seasons. During his spell at the club he became an international. In 1993 he signed for the Swiss side, Servette, for a while and then he moved to Górnik Zabrze. There he played for a season before returning to Olimpia Poznań. He continued his career Widzew Łódź, for a season and then moved to Portugal and Porto. There he played for four seasons winning as many Championships, as well as a Taça de Portugal and a Supertaça Cândido de Oliveira. In 1999 he moved to the Italian Salamanca and the following season he returned to Poland to join Pogoń Szczecin. On 31 July 2001 he signed for the Greek side, AEK Athens. There he did not gain the trust of the manager, Fernando Santos and on 9 January 2002 his contract was terminated. He then signed for Amica Wronki, where he ended his career in 2003.

== International career ==
Mielcarski played for the Poland national team. He was a participant at the 1992 Summer Olympics, where Poland won the silver medal.

== Honours ==
Porto

- Primeira Divisão: 1995–96, 1996-97, 1997–98, 1998–99
- Taça de Portugal: 1997–98
- Supertaça Cândido de Oliveira: 1998

Poland Olympic

- Olympic silver medal: 1992
