= Dionysis Chiotis =

Greek footballer (born 1977)

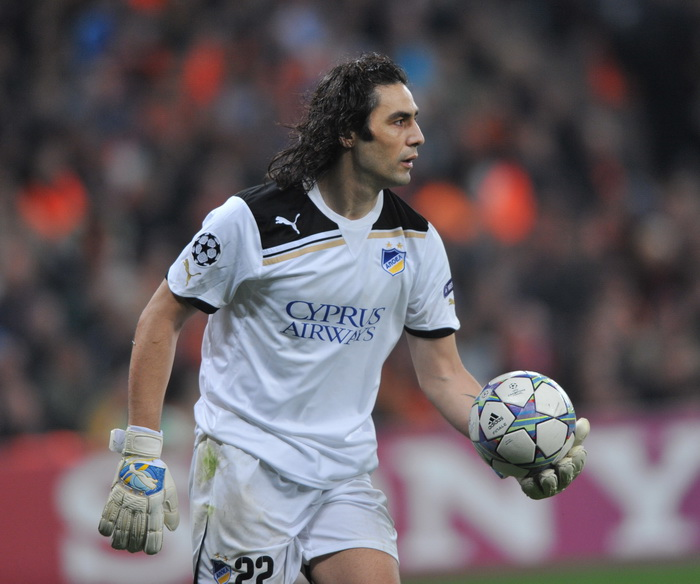
- Chiotis with APOEL, 2011

Personal information
- Full name: Dionysios Chiotis
- Date of birth: 4 June 1977 (age 49)
- Place of birth: Athens, Greece
- Height: 1.86 m (6 ft 1 in)
- Position: Goalkeeper

Team information
- Current team: OFI (goalkeeping coach)

Youth career
- 1992–1993: Daphni Daphniou Chaidari
- 1993–1995: AEK Athens

Senior career*
| Years | Team | Apps | (Gls) |
| 1995–2007 | AEK Athens | 85 | (0) |
| 1998–1999 | → Ethnikos Piraeus (loan) | 17 | (0) |
| 1999–2000 | → Proodeftiki (loan) | 18 | (0) |
| 2007–2008 | Kerkyra | 14 | (0) |
| 2008–2015 | APOEL | 112 | (0) |
| 2015–2016 | Trikala | 24 | (0) |
| 2016–2017 | Apollon Smyrnis | 25 | (0) |
| Total | | 317 | (0) |

International career^{‡}
- Greece U19
| 1996 | Greece U21 | | |
| 2002 | Greece | 1 | (0) |

Managerial career
- 2017–2018: Proodeftiki (goalkeeping coach)
- 2018–2019: Egaleo (goalkeeping coach)
- 2019–2020: Hatta Club (goalkeeping coach)
- 2020–2021: Ionikos (goalkeeping coach)
- 2021–2022: AEK Athens B (goalkeeping coach)
- 2022–2024: AEK Athens Academy (goalkeeping coach)
- 2024: Al-Fayha (goalkeeping coach)
- 2025–: OFI (goalkeeping coach)
- * Club domestic league appearances and goals as of 8 April 2018 ‡ National team caps and goals as of 20 November 2002

Dionysis Chiotis (Greek: Διονύσης Χιώτης; born 4 June 1977) is a Greek former professional footballer who played as a goalkeeper. Currently, he serves as a goalkeeping coach for OFI.

== Club career ==
=== AEK Athens ===
Chiotis took his first football steps in 1992 at Daphni Daphniou of Chaidari. In 1994, he was spotted by the people of AEK Athens and was brought to the club's academies. After 2.5 years, Dušan Bajević promoted him to the men's team.

On 11 January 1999, was loaned to Ethnikos Piraeus until the end of the season, alongside his teammate, Mattheos Platakis. In July of the same year he was loaned again at Proodeftiki, where he had a good performance. He returned to AEK in 2000, he stayed on the bench as a back-up choice behind Ilias Atmatsidis.

In 2001, he managed to establish himself as a starter. On 20 April 2002 he faced one of the worst moments of his career, in the crucial away match against Olympiacos, as his miscommunication with the defender Ferrugem in the 58th minute, gave their opponents the opportunity to score their third goal, where AEK eventually lost 4–3 along with the title. Ηowever, a week later, in the Cup final at the same stadium and against the same opponent, AEK got their revenge by winning 2–1 and Chiotis was voted as the MVP of the match. The following season, Chiotis had his best year at AEK, with an amazing performance both in the league and in the big matches for the UEFA Champions League. In 2005, the arrival of Stefano Sorrentino, combined with an injury suffered by Chiotis, left him out of the team again and since then he has not been a regular. In the summer of 2007, with Lorenzo Serra Ferrer at the bench, Chiotis left AEK after 13 years. With AEK he won 3 cups and 1 Super Cup.

=== Kerkyra ===
On 22 May 2007, his contract with AEK expired and on 27 July Chiotis joined Kerkyra, where he signed a one-year contract, which was terminated on 6 May 2008.

=== APOEL ===
In June 2008, he joined APOEL and with his high-level appearances, he contributed to the winning of the Cyprus Championship 2008–09 and the qualification for the first time of the club at the group stage of the 2009–10 UEFA Champions League. In that season, his club had the lowest number of goals conceded. He was also voted as the MVP of the club for that season, and became one of the favorite players of APOEL fans.

In the 2009–10 Champions League group stage, he helped APOEL to take a point against Atletico Madrid in Spain by holding Atletico to 0-0. At the same week he was voted as the best goalkeeper of the week in the Champions League. He appeared in all six official 2009–10 UEFA Champions League group stage matches with APOEL and he had great performances.

The next season, he helped APOEL to win the 2010–11 Cypriot First Division, adding the second championship title to his honours list.

The following season, he appeared in six 2011–12 UEFA Champions League matches for APOEL, in the club's surprising run to the quarter-finals of the competition. On 7 March 2012, Chiotis helped APOEL to reach the UEFA Champions League quarter-finals by saving two penalties in the penalty shoot-out of the last 16 return match against Lyon.

At the end of the 2012–13 season, he became a champion for the third time in his career after winning the 2012–13 Cypriot First Division with APOEL.

During the 2013–14 season, he appeared in one 2013–14 UEFA Europa League group stage match for APOEL and managed to win all the titles in Cyprus, the Cypriot League, the Cypriot Cup and the Cypriot Super Cup.

On 25 May 2015, one day after winning the 2014–15 season double with APOEL, the team announced that Chiotis was leaving after 7 years in the club, as his contract would not be renewed. Eventually he had 121 appearances with the club in all competitions.

=== Trikala ===
On 24 June 2015, aged 38, Chiotis signed a contract with Panelefsiniakos, but he left the team two months later due to important changes to the club's board of directors. A few days later, on 26 August 2015, he signed a contract with the Greek Football League side Trikala.

=== Apollon Smyrnis ===
On 29 June 2016, aged 39, Chiotis signed a contract with Apollon Smyrnis, in his club's effort to be promoted to Super League.

== International career ==
Chiotis competed with Greece once in 20 November 2002, in a friendly match against Finland for 45 minutes replacing Antonis Nikopolidis.

== Honours ==
AEK Athens

- Greek Cup: 1995–96, 1996–97, 2001–02
- Greek Super Cup: 1996

APOEL

- Cypriot First Division: 2008–09, 2010–11, 2012–13, 2013–14, 2014–15
- Cypriot Cup: 2013–14, 2014–15
- Cypriot Super Cup: 2008, 2009, 2011, 2013
