= Christos Kiourkos =

Greek footballer

Personal information
- Date of birth: January 1, 1972 (age 54)
- Place of birth: Egaleo, Greece
- Height: 1.90 m (6 ft 3 in)
- Position: Goalkeeper

Senior career*
Years	Team	Apps	(Gls)
–1996	Chaidari		
1996–1999	Kallithea		
1999–2003	Ethnikos Asteras		
2002	→ Panachaiki (loan)		
2003–2004	Vyzas		
2004–2006	Agios Dimitrios		
2006–2007	Themistoklis Egaleo		
- * Club domestic league appearances and goals

Christos Kiourkos (Greek: Χρήστος Κιούρκος; born January 1, 1972) is a retired Greek football goalkeeper.
