= Carlos Gamarra =

Paraguayan footballer (born 1971)

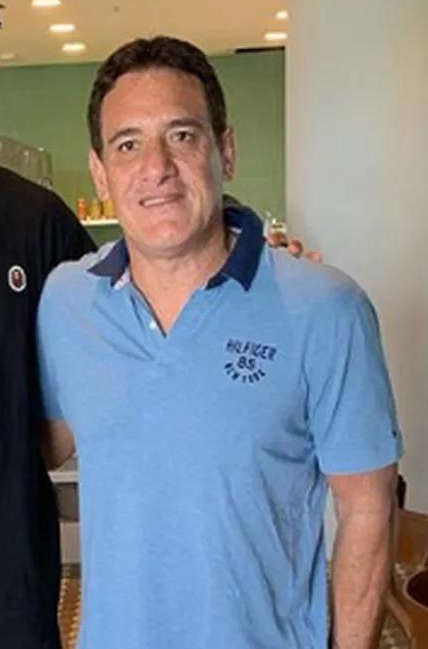
- Gamarra in 2019

Personal information
- Full name: Carlos Alberto Gamarra Pavón
- Date of birth: 17 February 1971 (age 55)
- Place of birth: Ypacaraí, Paraguay
- Height: 1.80 m (5 ft 11 in)
- Position: Centre back

Senior career*
Years	Team	Apps	(Gls)
1991–1992	Cerro Porteño	35	(2)
1992–1993	Independiente	8	(0)
1993–1995	Cerro Porteño	49	(2)
1995–1997	Internacional	59	(5)
1997–1998	Benfica	13	(0)
1998–1999	Corinthians	31	(3)
1999–2000	Atlético Madrid	32	(0)
2000–2002	Flamengo	4	(1)
2001–2002	→ AEK Athens (loan)	24	(0)
2002–2005	Inter Milan	27	(0)
2005–2006	Palmeiras	33	(2)
2007	Olimpia	25	(1)
Total		340	(16)

International career
1992–2004	Paraguay U23	18	(6)
1993–2006	Paraguay	110	(12)
Medal record
Representing Paraguay
Men's Football
Silver medal – second place	2004 Athens	Team competition
- * Club domestic league appearances and goals

Carlos Alberto Gamarra Pavón (Spanish pronunciation: [ˈkaɾlos alˈβeɾto ɣaˈmara paˈβon]) (born 17 February 1971) is a Paraguayan former professional footballer who played as a centre back. He captained the Paraguay national team at international level and was for a long time the most capped player in Paraguayan football history, having made 110 international appearances and scoring 12 goals. Throughout his career, Gamarra was known for his leadership, physical strength, ability in the air, heading accuracy, and outstanding tackling skills, which made him one of the most respected defenders in South America.

Gamarra appeared for the Paraguay national team 110 times, scoring 12 goals, from 1993 to 2006, representing the team at 10 major tournaments and captained the squad during the latter part of his career. He is the second most capped player of the national team, his record being broken by Paulo da Silva in 2013. Gamarra appeared for Paraguay at three FIFA World Cup tournaments (1998, 2002 and 2006), five Copa América tournaments (1993, 1995, 1997, 1999 and 2004), and twice at the Summer Olympic Games (1992 and 2004, with Paraguay claiming Silver Medals in the latter). Gamarra was named as the Paraguayan Footballer of the Year in 1997 and 1998, and was also included in the 1998 FIFA World Cup Team of the Tournament.

== Club career ==
Born in Ypacarai, Gamarra began his club career playing for Cerro Porteño in his home country in 1991, and went on to win the Paraguayan national championship with Cerro in 1992. He moved to Independiente for the 1992–93 football season in Argentina, but stayed only briefly before moving back to Cerro Porteño.

In 1995, Gamarra joined Internacional in Brazil, where his profile grew, eventually resulting in the naming of him as Paraguayan Footballer of the Year in 1997 by the Paraguayan newspaper Diario ABC Color (an achievement which Gamarra repeated in 1998). He moved to S.L. Benfica for the Portuguese 1997–1998 season, before returning to Brazil, this time with SC Corinthians, where he won Serie A Brazilian Championship in 1998.

After finishing the 1999 Brazilian football season with Corinthians, he moved to the Spanish league, after the Brazilian club agreed with Atlético Madrid for 9 million USD in June 1999. Atlético were surprisingly relegated in 2000, and Gamarra briefly moved back to Brazil, this time joining Flamengo. On 24 July 2001 Gamarra returned to Europe and was loaned to the Greek side, AEK Athens for a fee of 200 million drachmas (€600,000) with a buy-out option. There established as a key player of the club and leader in their defense. Despite losing the Championship in a tie with Olympiacos, they won the Greek Cup.

On the back of his World Cup performance in 2002, he joined Inter Milan in Italy's Serie A for the 2002–03 season. In his first pre-season, he scored the winning goal in the Pirelli Cup final against Roma. Inter finished the season as runners-up in the league, with Gamarra making 14 appearances. His next season at the club was less successful, as Inter finished fourth in the league, and Gamarra made only 10 appearances. He remained at Inter for the 2004–2005 season, but after another season largely spent on the bench he joined the Brazilian side Palmeiras in July 2005. In 2007, Gamarra decided to return to Paraguay to end his football career and signed for Olimpia. Gamarra decided to retire after the 2007 season.

== International career ==
Gamarra's first international cap came against Bolivia on 27 March 1993, a 2–1 loss for Paraguay.

Gamarra made his first big impact in international football during Paraguay's campaign at 1998 FIFA World Cup, in the second round of which Paraguay were knocked out by France (the eventual winners). Gamarra played in all four of Paraguay's games, garnering great respect for his defensive skills, and did not concede a single foul in any of his side's matches. FIFA named him as part of the All-Star team of the World Cup. At the 2002 FIFA World Cup in South Korea and Japan, Paraguay were once again knocked out in the second round. Gamarra played every single minute of Paraguay's campaign, and again completed his side's participation without conceding a foul.

Gamarra captained the Paraguay side to a silver medal in the 2004 Summer Olympics, losing 1–0 to Argentina in the final. On 4 August, before the Summer Olympics began, he played in a preparation game against the Portugal of Cristiano Ronaldo in the city of Algarve, resulting in a 5–0 defeat.

In the 2006 FIFA World Cup, Gamarra was the first player in the tournament to score an own goal, from an incoming free kick from David Beckham in his team's opening match against England, which eventually led to England's 1–0 win. (Scored after just three minutes, this became the fastest World Cup finals own goal in history, until the 2014 FIFA World Cup where Sead Kolašinac scored just after two minutes playing for Bosnia and Herzegovina against Argentina in the group stages.) During the 2006 FIFA World Cup, Gamarra announced his retirement from the Paraguay national team.

== Career statistics ==
=== Club ===
Appearances and goals by club, season and competition
Club	Season	League			Cup		Continental		Other		Total	
Club	Season	Division	Apps	Goals	Apps	Goals	Apps	Goals	Apps	Goals	Apps	Goals
Cerro Porteño	1991	Paraguayan Primera División	23	0								
Cerro Porteño	1992	Paraguayan Primera División	12	2								
Cerro Porteño	Total		35	2								
Independiente	1993	Argentine Primera División	8	0								
Cerro Porteño	1993	Paraguayan Primera División	15	0								
Cerro Porteño	1994	Paraguayan Primera División	24	1								
Cerro Porteño	1995	Paraguayan Primera División	10	1								
Cerro Porteño	Total		49	2								
Internacional	1995	Campeonato Brasileiro Série A	17	0								
Internacional	1996	Campeonato Brasileiro Série A	22	2								
Internacional	1997	Campeonato Brasileiro Série A	20	3								
Internacional	Total		59	5								
Benfica	1997–98	Primeira Divisão	13	0	2	0	2	0	—		17	0
Corinthians	1998	Campeonato Brasileiro Série A	31	3								
Corinthians	1999	Campeonato Brasileiro Série A	0	0			9	0			9	0
Corinthians	Total		31	3			9	0			40	3
Atlético Madrid	1999–2000	La Liga	32	0	5	0	6	1	—		43	1
Flamengo	2000	Campeonato Brasileiro Série A	4	1			4	0			8	1
Flamengo	2001	Campeonato Brasileiro Série A	0	0								
Flamengo	Total		4	1			4	0			8	1
AEK Athens (loan)	2001–02	Alpha Ethniki	24	0	8	0	8	1	—		40	1
Inter Milan	2002–03	Serie A	14	0	2	0	4	0	—		20	0
Inter Milan	2003–04	Serie A	10	0	5	0	3	0	—		18	0
Inter Milan	2004–05	Serie A	3	0	3	0	0	0	—		6	0
Inter Milan	Total		27	0	10	0	7	0	0	0	44	0
Palmeiras	2005	Campeonato Brasileiro Série A	30	1							30	1
Palmeiras	2006	Campeonato Brasileiro Série A	3	1			8	1			11	2
Palmeiras	Total		33	2			8	1			41	3
Olimpia	2007	Paraguayan Primera División	25	1								
Career total			340	16								

=== International ===
Scores and results list Paraguay U23's goal tally first, score column indicates score after each Gamarra goal.

List of international goals scored by Carlos Gamarra
No.	Date	Venue	Opponent	Score	Result	Competition
1	30 July 1992	Estadio Luis Casanova, Valencia, Spain	Morocco	3–0	3–1	1992 Summer Olympics
2	15 August 2004	Kaftanzoglio Stadium, Thessaloniki, Greece	Ghana	1–0	1–2	2004 Summer Olympics

== Honours ==
Cerro Porteño

- Paraguayan League: 1992, 1994
- Torneo República: 1991

Internacional

- Campeonato Gaúcho: 1997

Corinthians

- Campeonato Brasileiro: 1998
- Campeonato Paulista: 1999

Flamengo

- Campeonato Carioca: 2001
- Copa dos Campeões: 2001

AEK Athens

- Greek football Cup: 2002

Inter Milan

- Coppa Italia: 2005

Paraguay

- Silver medal, Olympic Games: 2004

Individual

- El País South America Ideal Team of the Year: 1995, 1996, 1998, 2000, 2005
- Paraguayan Footballer of the Year: 1997, 1998
- FIFA World Cup: All-star team 1998
- 1998 Best Defender CONMEBOL
- Campeonato Brasileiro Série A Team of the Year: 2005
- Bola de Prata: 1995, 1996, 1998, 2005

== See also ==
- List of men's footballers with 100 or more international caps
- Players and Records in Paraguayan Football
