= Stathis Kappos =

Greek Canadian soccer player (born 1979)

Personal information
- Full name: Efstathios Dimitrios Kappos
- Date of birth: 31 July 1979 (age 47)
- Place of birth: Toronto, Ontario, Canada
- Height: 1.77 m (5 ft 10 in)
- Position: Right back

Youth career
- 1991–1994: Olympic Flame
- 1995–1997: Pamisos Messini

Senior career*
Years	Team	Apps	(Gls)
1997–2001	Kalamata	25	(3)
2001–2005	AEK Athens	5	(0)
2005	Aris	1	(0)
2005–2006	Akratitos	0	(0)
2006	Messiniakos	9	(1)
2006–2007	Kalamata	6	(0)
2007–2008	Fostiras	4	(0)
2008	Thyella Patras	7	(1)
2008–2009	Aias Salamina	9	(1)
2009–2014	Agios Dimitrios	4	(0)
2016–2017	Neopentelikos	30	(11)

International career^{‡}
2001	Greece U21	2	(0)
2004	Canada	1	(0)
- * Club domestic league appearances and goals as of 6 August 2007 ‡ National team caps and goals as of 22 December 2009

Stathis Kappos (Greek: Στάθης Κάππος; born 31 July 1979) is a Canadian former football player, who played as a right back.

== Club career ==
Kappos started his football career as youngster at the Canadian side, Olympic Flame and later moved to Greece and joined Pamisos Messini. In 1997 he signed for Kalamata and became a professional footballer. On 9 August 2001 he was transferred to AEK Athens alongside his teammate, Sotiris Liberopoulos. In his first season at the club, he won the Cup. During his spell at AEK, he failed to establish himself in the squad making only five league appearances. On 14 January 2005 his contract was terminated and Kappos signed for Aris. There he played until the end of the season making only one appearance in the league.

Afterwards, he moved to Akratitos, where he did not manage to make a single league appearance. On 2 August 2006 Kappos left Akratitos on a free transfer to join third division side, Messiniakos. Messiniakos finished first at the end of the season. He then returned to Kalamata for a year and later joined Fostiras. In 2008 he moved to Thyella Patras for a while before joining Aias Salamina. Afterwards he moved to Agios Dimitrios, where he played until 2014. He finished his career at Neopentelikos in 2017.

== International career ==
He played his one and only game for Canada on 18 January 2004 against Barbados in a friendly game.
