= Georgios Trichias =

Greek footballer

Personal information
- Date of birth: 14 September 1979 (age 47)
- Place of birth: Volos, Greece
- Height: 1.80 m (5 ft 11 in)
- Position: Striker

Senior career*
Years	Team	Apps	(Gls)
1997–1999	Niki Volos		
1999–2002	AEK Athens	1	(0)
1999	→ Panelefsiniakos (loan)	8	(3)
1999–2000	→ Athinaikos (loan)		
2000–2001	→ Panetolikos (loan)	26	(8)
2002	→ Apollon Athens (loan)	15	(2)
2003–2005	Kalamata	34	(12)
2005–2006	Messiniakos		
2006–2007	Olympiacos Volos		
2007–2008	Thrasyvoulos	9	(1)
2008	Makedonikos		
2008–2009	Rodos		
2009–2010	Panachaiki		
2010	Rodos	8	(0)
2010–2011	AO Chania		
2011	Pyrgetos		
2011–2017	AER Afantou		
- * Club domestic league appearances and goals

Georgios Trichias (Greek: Γεώργιος Τριχιάς; born 14 September 1979) is a Greek former professional footballer.

== Club career ==
Trichias started his career in 1997 at Niki Volos. On 31 January 1999 he was transferred to the first division side, AEK Athens and was loaned to Panelefsiniakos for the rest of the season. In the summer of 2000 he was loaned to Athinaikos for a season and afterwards to Panetolikos, for another one. His performances at the club of Agrinio persuated the manager of AEK, Fernando Santos to give him a chance in the roster. Nevertheless he barely played in the club and on 18 January 2002, he was loaned to Apollon Athens for the rest of the season. In the summer of 2002 he was transferred to Kalamata where he played for 3 seasons. He then played for Messiniakos, Olympiacos Volos, Thrasyvoulos, Makedonikos, Rodos, Panachaiki, AO Chania and Pyrgetos, before settling permanently in Rhodes, where he retired in 2017 playing at the amateur club AER Afantou.

== After football ==
After retiring as a footballer Trichias serves in an administrative position the Rodion Athlisis club.
