= Athanasios Moutsios =

Greek footballer

Tasos Moutsios
Personal information
- Full name: Athanasios Moutsios
- Date of birth: 10 October 1978 (age 48)
- Place of birth: Drama, Greece
- Height: 1.86 m (6 ft 1 in)
- Position: Midfielder

Senior career*
Years	Team	Apps	(Gls)
1999–2002	Iraklis		
2002	Panserraikos		
2002–2003	Kalamata		
2003–2005	Doxa Drama		
2005–2006	Diagoras		
- * Club domestic league appearances and goals

Athanasios Moutsios (Greek: Αθανάσιος Μούτσιος; born 10 October 1978) is a Greek former footballer who played as a midfielder.
