= Sašo Karadžov =

Macedonian footballer

Personal information
- Full name: Sašo Ivan Karadžov
- Date of birth: 11 December 1970 (age 55)
- Place of birth: Skopje
- Height: 1.85 m (6 ft 1 in)
- Position: Defender

Senior career*
Years	Team	Apps	(Gls)
1995–1997	FK Vardar		
1998–1999	Iraklis		

International career
1995	Macedonia	4	(1)
- * Club domestic league appearances and goals

Sašo Karadžov (Macedonian: Сашо Караџов; born 11 December 1970) is a retired Macedonian football defender.
