= Avraam Xanthopoulos =

Greek footballer (born in 1972)

Personal information
- Date of birth: 29 September 1972 (age 54)
- Position: Defender

Senior career*
Years	Team	Apps	(Gls)
1993–	Doxa Drama		
–1998	Iraklis		
1998–1999	Ethnikos Asteras		
1999–2002	Apollon Kalamarias		
- * Club domestic league appearances and goals

Avraam Xanthopoulos (Greek: Αβραάμ Ξανθόπουλος; born 29 September 1972) is a retired Greek football defender.
