= Journal of Power Sources =

- Discipline: Electrochemistry
- Language: English
- Edited by: Stefano Passerini

Publication details
- History: 1976-present
- Publisher: Elsevier
- Frequency: Biweekly
- Impact factor: 9.719 (2021)

Standard abbreviations
- ISO 4: J. Power Sources

Indexing
- ISSN: 0378-7753

Links
- Journal homepage; Online access

The Journal of Power Sources is a peer-reviewed scientific journal covering all aspects of electrochemical energy conversion (like fuel cells, batteries, supercapacitors, and photo-electrochemical cells). The current editors-in-chief is Stefano Passerini, According to the Journal Citation Reports, the journal has a 2021 impact factor of 9.719. Until December 2009, the journal was published in many "small" volumes which contained typically 2 issues. In the years 2010 and 2011, the journal tried to adopt the "one volume per year" convention common outside Elsevier. Starting January 2012, however, it decided to completely abandon the issue numbers and became a volume-only journal.
