= Michail Berneanou =

Greek footballer

Personal information
- Full name: Michail-Răzvan Berneanou
- Date of birth: 14 April 1979 (age 47)
- Position: Defender

Senior career*
Years	Team	Apps	(Gls)
1997–2000	Iraklis		
2000–2003	Ethnikos Asteras		
2004	Agrotikos Asteras		
2004–2006	Anagennisi Epanomi		
2006–2007	Pandramaikos		

International career
- Greece U21
- * Club domestic league appearances and goals

Michail Berneanou (Greek: Μιχαήλ Μπερνεάνου; born 14 April 1979) is a retired Greek football defender. (Note: Michail Berneanou at WorldFootball.net)

He is the brother of George Berneanou (Greek: Γιώργος Μπερνεάνου; born 29 August 1984), Goalkeeper coach of FC Viktoria Koln.
