= Konstantinos Papadopoulos (footballer, born 1976) =

Greek footballer

Personal information
- Full name: Κωνσταντίνος Παπαδόπουλος
- Date of birth: 18 December 1976 (age 49)
- Place of birth: Athens, Greece
- Height: 1.74 m (5 ft 9 in)
- Position: Midfielder

Senior career*
Years	Team	Apps	(Gls)
–2000	Atromitos		
2000–2002	Ethnikos Asteras		
2003	Apollon Smyrnis		
2004–2006	Asteras Tripolis		
2007	Panetolikos		
2007–2008	Korinthos		
2008–2009	Fostiras		
- * Club domestic league appearances and goals

Konstantinos Papadopoulos (Greek: Κωνσταντίνος Παπαδόπουλος; born 18 December 1986) is a retired Greek football midfielder.
