= Ilias Stogiannis =

Greek footballer

Personal information
- Full name: Ilias Stogiannis
- Date of birth: 13 February 1976
- Place of birth: Kozani, Greece
- Height: 1.92 m (6 ft 4 in)
- Position: Goalkeeper

Youth career
- Naoussa F.C.

Senior career*
Years	Team	Apps	(Gls)
1993–1997	Naoussa F.C.	61	(0)
1997–2001	Iraklis	23	(0)
2001–2002	Ionikos F.C.	4	(0)
2003	Thrasyvoulos	11	(0)
2003	Olympiacos Volos	0	(0)
2004	Agrotikos Asteras	6	(0)
2004–2005	Doxa Katokopias	25	(0)
2005–2006	Acharnaikos	26	(0)
2006–2007	APEP Pitsilia	23	(0)
2007–2008	AC Omonia	0	(0)
2008–2009	Panetolikos F.C.	0	(0)
2009–2010	Rodos F.C.		
- * Club domestic league appearances and goals

Ilias Stogiannis (born 13 February 1976 in Kozani, Greece) is a professional football goalkeeper who last played for Rodos F.C. in the Greek second division.

Stogiannis played for Ionikos F.C. during the 2001–02 Alpha Ethniki season.
