= Angelos Georgiou =

Greek footballer

Personal information
- Full name: Angelos Georgiou
- Date of birth: 27 August 1974 (age 52)
- Place of birth: Larissa, Greece
- Height: 1.85 m (6 ft 1 in)
- Position: Goalkeeper

Youth career
- 1991–1994: AEL

Senior career*
Years	Team	Apps	(Gls)
1994–1997	AEL	60	(0)
1997–2000	Paniliakos	80	(0)
2000–2003	Olympiacos	22	(0)
2003–2004	Akratitos	7	(0)
2004	Niki Volos		(0)
2004–2005	PAS Giannina		(0)
2005–2006	APOP Kinyras		(0)
2006	AEK Larnaca		(0)
2006–2007	Zakynthos		(0)
2007–2008	AEP Paphos		(0)
2008–2009	Nea Salamis		(0)
2009–2010	Digenis Akritas Morphou		(0)
2016–2017	A.S. Mandrion		(0)
- * Club domestic league appearances and goals

Angelos Georgiou (Greek: Άγγελος Γεωργίου; born 27 August 1974) is a Greek retired professional goalkeeper. He played for clubs including Paniliakos F.C. and Olympiacos F.C. In the 2001–2002 season, he was a member of the Olympiacos team that won the national title.

== Honours ==
=== Club ===
Olympiacos

- Alpha Ethniki: 2001–02
