= Nikolaos Georgeas =

Greek footballer (born 1976)

Nikos Georgeas
Personal information
- Full name: Nikolaos Georgeas
- Date of birth: 27 December 1976 (age 49)
- Place of birth: Kalamata, Greece
- Height: 1.71 m (5 ft 7 in)
- Positions: Right back; defensive midfielder

Youth career
- Mani

Senior career*
Years	Team	Apps	(Gls)
1995–2000	Kalamata	65	(1)
1996	→ PAS Giannina (loan)	19	(0)
2000–2012	AEK Athens	188	(1)
2012–2013	Veria	18	(0)
2013–2015	AEK Athens	37	(0)
Total		326	(2)
- * Club domestic league appearances and goals as of 8 July 2015

Nikolaos Georgeas (Greek: Νικόλαος Γεωργέας, born 27 December 1976) is a Greek former professional footballer who played as a right-back. He was most recently administrative director of AEK Athens Academy.

== Club career ==
Georgeas started his football career at Mani Platsa. At the age of 19 he joined the Kalamata. On 17 January 2001 Georgeas was transferred to AEK Athens for a fee of 500 million drachmas. He spent almost his entire career playing for the club, where the supporters have a lot of respect on him, because of his passion and love the team. He is famous for the chant that the supporters have dedicated to him, with the lyrics "Georgea, Georgea, ta fyta stin Kalamata ine orea!" (Greek: "Γεωργέα, Γεωργέα, τα φυτά στην Καλαμάτα είναι ωραία!"), which means "Georgeas, Georgeas, the plants in Kalamata are nice!", a reference to the footballer's birthplace, Kalamata, in southern Greece, and to the weed produced widely in the area. On 26 May 2008 Georgeas signed a new 2-year contract which will keep him at the club until 2010. Georgeas is also regarded to be one of the club's most loyal players and was voted in the top 10 legend list of AEK Athens history. On 27 February 2011, Georgeas scored his first goal against Ergotelis in a 2–3 away win. On 10 April, he also scored his second goal against AEL. In the following season, the manager Nikos Kostenoglou wanted to utilize his skills and experience and placed Georgeas as a defensive midfielder. Georgeas, who the previous season did not make AEK's starting eleven, tried to meet the expectations of his manager and he was used in various positions. Moreover, he was chosen to be the captain in some games, being the oldest player in the team. During his spell at the club, he won two Cups.

On 18 July 2012, after the expiration of his contract, Georgeas left the club after a spell of almost 12 years and signed for Veria. There he scored a total of 18 appearances several of which as a captain. After the end of the one-year contract with Veria, AEK decided to bring back Nikos Georgeas to play in the third division. He was considered one of the leaders in AEK's effort to return to the Super League. In July 2015, after the return of AEK Athens to the first division, Georgeas decided to finish his career.

=== After football ===
Since September 2019, Georgeas has been heading the administration of the AEK Academy together with Konstantinos Papapostolou.

== Controversy ==
Additional suspects include Veria Director of Football Giorgos Lanaris and former owner Giorgos Arvanitidis, regarding 6 January 2013 match of Olympiacos against Veria. Veria player Nikolaos Georgeas and club's manager Dimitris Kalaitzidis at the time, testified in March 2015 that Lanaris following Arvanitidis orders demanded from Veria players to lose with a 3–0 score, which eventually happened. According to Andreadis, both Marinakis and Arvanitidis had agreed on the match fixing.

The player of Veria, Alexandros Kalogeris confirmed Georgeas' testimony, at the Athens court houses, that he entered the game in the second half after being instructed by the team manager to lose the game 3–0. The scandal has seen revelations about a series of dramatic events including phone tapping by Greece's intelligence agency, the involvement of Interpol, the bombing of a referee's premises, and a row erupting between the new Greek government and UEFA and FIFA. Football violence has also spiralled out of control, with riot police regularly seen on the pitch. However, despite the long-running investigation into match-fixing, no one has yet been jailed. Five people have been sentenced to time in prison but were subsequently freed on appeal. Charges against a number of the accused have been dropped and there are fears that, like so many other investigations in Greece, they will fizzle out.

== Career statistics ==
Club performance			League		Cup^{1}		Continental		Total	
Season	Club	League	Apps	Goals	Apps	Goals	Apps	Goals	Apps	Goals
Greece			League		Greek Cup		Europe		Total	
1995–96	Kalamata	Alpha Ethniki	0	0	1	0	0	0	1	0
1995–96	PAS Giannina	Beta Ethniki	19	0	2	0	0	0	21	0
1996–97	Kalamata	Alpha Ethniki	19	0	2	0	0	0	21	0
1997–98	Kalamata	Alpha Ethniki	0	0	0	0	0	0	0	0
1998–99	Kalamata	Beta Ethniki	13	0	1	0	0	0	14	0
1999–2000	Kalamata	Alpha Ethniki	28	1	8	0	0	0	36	1
2000–01	Kalamata	Alpha Ethniki	5	0	9	0	0	0	14	0
2000–01	AEK Athens	Alpha Ethniki	9	0	0	0	0	0	9	0
2001–02	AEK Athens	Alpha Ethniki	21	0	12	0	8	0	41	0
2002–03	AEK Athens	Alpha Ethniki	16	0	8	0	2	0	26	0
2003–04	AEK Athens	Alpha Ethniki	12	0	4	0	6	0	22	0
2004–05	AEK Athens	Alpha Ethniki	6	0	1	0	2	0	9	0
2005–06	AEK Athens	Alpha Ethniki	25	0	5	0	0	0	30	0
2006–07	AEK Athens	Super League	12	0	1	0	7	0	20	0
2007–08	AEK Athens	Super League	8	0	0	0	0	0	8	0
2008–09	AEK Athens	Super League	24	0	5	0	0	0	29	0
2009–10	AEK Athens	Super League	16	0	1	0	5	0	22	0
2010–11	AEK Athens	Super League	12	1	4	1	1	0	17	2
2011–12	AEK Athens	Super League	27	0	2	0	4	0	33	0
2012–13	Veria	Super League	18	0	0	0	0	0	18	0
2013–14	AEK Athens	Football League 2	26	0	4	1	0	0	30	1
2014–15	AEK Athens	Football League	11	0	0	0	0	0	11	0
Career total			327	2	70	2	35	0	432	4

Last updated: 2015-05-27
Source: aekfc.gr

^{1} Includes 4 caps and 1 goal in the semi-pro Football League 2 Cup.

== Honours ==
AEK Athens

- Greek Cup: 2001–02, 2010–11
- Football League: 2014–15
- Football League 2: 2013–14 (6th Group)

Individual

- Best Super League Greece Team: 2011–12
