= Sotiris Liberopoulos =

Greek footballer

Personal information
- Full name: Sotirios Liberopoulos
- Date of birth: 29 June 1977 (age 49)
- Place of birth: Filiatra, Greece
- Height: 1.84 m (6 ft 0 in)
- Position: Goalkeeper

Senior career*
Years	Team	Apps	(Gls)
1994–1995	Erani Filiatra		
1995–1997	Kalamata	14	(0)
1997–1998	Ethnikos Piraeus	10	(0)
1998–2001	Kalamata	64	(0)
2001–2004	AEK Athens	4	(0)
2002	→ La Louvière (loan)	0	(0)
2004–2005	Aris	20	(0)
2005–2006	Akratitos	9	(0)
2006–2007	Kastoria	21	(0)
2007–2013	Skoda Xanthi	31	(0)
2013–2015	Kallithea	13	(0)
2015	Ermionida	8	(0)
2015–2017	Erani Filiatra		

International career
	Greece U17	22	(0)
	Greece U19	32	(0)
1996–1998	Greece U21	18	(0)

Managerial career
- 2019–2021: Kalamata (goalkeeping coach)
- 2020: Kalamata (caretaker)
- * Club domestic league appearances and goals as of 25 April 2013 (UTC)

Sotiris Liberopoulos (Greek: Σωτήρης Λυμπερόπουλος; born 29 June 1977) is a Greek former professional footballer who played as a goalkeeper.

== Club career ==
Liberopoulos began his career from the local club Erani Filiatra alongside his cousin, Nikos. In 1995 he joined Kalamata where he made his debut in the first division on 14 January 1996 against Apollon Athens at Rizoupoli. He spent a season at Ethnikos Piraeus, but in 1998 he returned to Kalamata.

On 9 August 2001 Liberopoulos was transferred to AEK Athens alongside his teammate, Stathis Kappos. In his first season at the club, he won the Cup. On 22 August 2002 he was loaned to La Louvière, but on 7 September his loan was terminated. During his spell at AEK, he failed to establish himself in the squad making only four league appearances. On 20 July 2004 his contract was terminated and Kappos signed for Aris. At the club of Thessaloniki, he emerged as their main goalkeeper for a season.

In 2005 he moved to Akratitos and in the following season he played for Kastoria. Afterwards, Liberopoulos joined Skoda Xanthi, where he played until 2013. He then moved to Kallithea for two seasons and later he signed for Ermionida. He finished his career at the club where he began football, Erani Filiatra in 2017.

== International career ==
Liberopoulos was a member of all the youth departments of the national team. From 1996 to 1998 made 18 appearances with Greece U21.
