= Ilija Ivić =

Serbian footballer (born 1971)

Personal information
- Full name: Ilija Ivić
- Date of birth: 17 February 1971 (age 55)
- Place of birth: Banatski Despotovac, SFR Yugoslavia
- Height: 1.84 m (6 ft 0 in)
- Position: Striker

Senior career*
Years	Team	Apps	(Gls)
1988–1991	Proleter Zrenjanin	92	(26)
1991–1994	Red Star Belgrade	77	(37)
1994–1999	Olympiacos	111	(64)
1999–2000	Torino	19	(0)
2001–2002	Aris	18	(6)
2002–2004	AEK Athens	47	(18)
Total		364	(151)

International career
1990	Yugoslavia U21	2	(1)
1998	FR Yugoslavia	1	(0)
- * Club domestic league appearances and goals

Ilija Ivić (Serbian Cyrillic: Илија Ивић; born 17 February 1971) is a Serbian former professional footballer who played as a striker. A skillful attacker who showed great technical ability, Ivić could often be found in a supporting attacking role, opening up spaces for teammates. He played once for the national team of his country, against Switzerland in September 1998. He was a former technical director of AEK Athens.

== Club career ==
Ivić began his football career in 1986 at Proleter Zrenjanin, where he stayed until 1991. Afterwards, he played for three years at Red Star Belgrade (until 1994). In his first season with Red Star, he won the Yugoslav national championship in 1991–92, scoring 26 goals in 92 games. The following season he also won FR Yugoslavia Cup winner with the Belgrade club in 1993.

In the summer of 1993, he moved to Greece and transferred to Olympiacos and scored 16 goals in 30 league appearances. During his years at Olympiacos he won the Greek championship in 1997, 1998, and the double in 1999, having his best campaign in the second of those title triumphs, claiming 26 goals in 32 matches. He was a member of Olympiacos squad in 1998–99 UEFA Champions League, when his team achieved its greatest success in European competition while they reached the quarter-finals and being eliminated by Juventus.

His next step was with Italian club, Torino in the summer of 1999, although he failed to find the net in 19 games, nine as a substitute in his first season in Serie A. Having failed to break into the first team the following term, he returned to Greece to signed Aris, where he played for one and a half season.

On 2 January 2002, Ivić moved to AEK Athens. At the end of the season AEK finished second in the Greek Championship, tied with Olympiacos, with two club facing each other in the Cup final. On 27 April 2002 Ivić scored the winning goal in the match against Olympiacos, but refused to celebrate, for sentimental reasons, having played for the opposition earlier in his career. In the following season, he played a considerable part in AEK finishing third in the league after scoring nine goals in 20 games. In the UEFA Champions League he featured in five of AEK's six drawn games in the first group stage. On 12 July 2004 Ivic officially retired as a footballer in order to help the club from an administrative position.

== International career ==
Ivić was played for Yugoslavia U21 in 1990 playing 3 matches scoring once and was in the squad for the 1990 European U21 Championship.

He played for FR Yugoslavia coming a sub in a friendly against Switzerland on 2 September 1998.

== Post-playing career ==
In the summer of 2004, Ivić accepted the proposal of AEK Athens administration of Demis Nikolaidis and assumed the position of technical director. Ivić stayed for almost three years as the technical manager of AEK and during his career had a successful choices of players despite been given a small budget. In February 2007 he resigned and appealed that he had some collaboration problems with the then manager of AEK, Lorenzo Serra Ferrer. In June 2007, Ivić accepted the proposal of Petros Kokkalis, the management director of Olympiacos and assumed the position of technical manager. He resigned as technical director of Olympiacos on 7 May 2008. Ivić also resigned from Red Star in the end of 2008–09 season because of financial problems of the club. Οn 27 August 2019, he signed as the technical director of AEK Athens, where he resigned οn 23 December 2020.

== Personal life ==
He is the older brother of the former footballer and current football manager Vladimir Ivić.

== Honours ==
Red Star Belgrade

- Yugoslav First League: 1991–92
- FR Yugoslavia Cup: 1992–93

Olympiacos

- Alpha Ethniki: 1996–97, 1997–98, 1998–99
- Greek Cup: 1998–99

Torino

- Serie B: 2000–01

AEK Athens

- Greek Cup: 2001–02
