= Rodrigo (footballer, born October 1980) =

Brazilian footballer (born 1980)

Ferrugem
Personal information
- Full name: Rodrigo Lacerda Ramos
- Date of birth: 6 October 1980 (age 46)
- Place of birth: São Bernardo do Campo, Brazil
- Height: 1.84 m (6 ft 0 in)
- Positions: Center back; midfielder

Senior career*
Years	Team	Apps	(Gls)
1998–1999	Palmeiras	6	(0)
2000–2002	AEK Athens	46	(1)
2003	Atlético Mineiro	28	(2)
2003–2008	Ajaccio	82	(0)
2007–2008	→ Strasbourg (loan)	34	(2)
2008–2010	Júbilo Iwata	17	(1)
2009–2010	→ Strasbourg (loan)	38	(1)
2010–2012	Sion	59	(1)
2012–2013	Lausanne-Sport	20	(0)
2013–2015	Villa Nova		
Total		330	(8)

International career
1999	Brazil U20	5	(1)
- * Club domestic league appearances and goals

Rodrigo Lacerda Ramos (born 6 October 1980), also known as Ferrugem in Brazil, is a Brazilian former professional footballer who played as a midfielder.

== Club career ==
Rodrigo started his career at Palmeiras. On 11 July 2000 he moved to Greece and signed for AEK Athens. Despite his acquisition on a free transfer, on 28 December 2001, FIFA awarded Palmeiras the fee of 650 million drachmas from AEK, as compensation, due to the player's transfer upon his contract's expiration.

Rodrigo spent two seasons at the club having a mediocre performance. On 20 April 2002 he became a negative protagonist in the derby against Olympiacos at the Olympic Stadium, which was deemed as the championship final. His miscommunication with the goalkeeper, Dionysis Chiotis, gave Alexis Alexandris the opportunity to score the third goal of Olympiacos, which greatly affected the outcome in their 4–3 defeat, resulting in loss of the title on the tie. Nevertheless, he won the Cup at the end of the season. On 9 July 2002 his contract with AEK was terminated and after a few months without as a free agent Rodrigo returned to Brazil and signed for Atlético Mineiro.

Afterwards, he moved to France and signed for Ajaccio. In 2007 he was loaned to Strasbourg for a season. On 17 July 2009, Rodrigo has returned to Strasbourg after two years, signing from Japanese side Júbilo Iwata on a two-year deal. In his second season he was loaned again to Strasbourg. In 2010 he moved to Switzerland and joined Sion for two years. In the following years he played for Lausanne-Sport and Villa Nova, where he retired in 2015.

== International career ==
Rodrigo captained Brazil U20 at the 1999 FIFA World Youth Championship in Nigeria.

== Honours ==
AEK Athens

- Greek Cup: 2001–02

Sion

- Swiss Cup: 2010–11
