= Georgios Xenidis =

Greek footballer (1974–2019)

Giorgos Xenidis
- Xenidis with Iraklis

Personal information
- Full name: Georgios Xenidis
- Date of birth: 6 December 1974
- Place of birth: Thessaloniki, Greece
- Date of death: 3 June 2019 (aged 44)
- Place of death: Thessaloniki, Greece
- Height: 1.82 m (6 ft 0 in)
- Position: Defender

Youth career
- –1994: Iraklis

Senior career*
Years	Team	Apps	(Gls)
1994–2002	Iraklis	161	(14)
2002	AEK Athens	9	(0)
2002–2004	Iraklis	34	(4)
2004–2006	Anorthosis Famagusta	40	(2)
2006–2008	Ionikos	38	(2)
Total		282	(22)
- * Club domestic league appearances and goals

Georgios Xenidis (Greek: Γεώργιος Ξενίδης; 6 December 1974 – 3 June 2019) was a Greek football player who played as a defender.

== Club career ==
Xenidis started his football career at the academy of Iraklis before being promoted to the men's team in the summer of 1994 where he played mostly as a left-back. On 3 January 2002 he was transferred to AEK Athens, where he played for the rest of the season. He wasn't able to establish himself in the team, due to the hard competition. At the end of the season they lost Championship in a tie with Olympiacos, but they won the Greek Cup. On 31 July 2002 he terminated his contract with AEK and returned to Iraklis.

In 2004 he moved to Cyprus in order to play for Anorthosis Famagusta, where he played for 2 seasons. Afterwards Xenidis returned to Greece to join Ionikos, where he was relegated to the second division after the end of the season. He played a season in the second division before retiring in July 2008.

== Death ==
On 3 June 2019 Xenidis died after a heart attack at the age of 44. Reports claimed that the former footballer felt sick and suffered a heart attack, without being able to receive medical care in time.

== Honours ==
AEK Athens

- Greek Cup: 2001–02
