= Sotiris Konstantinidis =

Greek footballer

Personal information
- Full name: Sotirios Konstantinidis
- Date of birth: 19 April 1977 (age 49)
- Place of birth: Sidirokastro, Greece
- Height: 1.78 m (5 ft 10 in)
- Position: Forward

Senior career*
Years	Team	Apps	(Gls)
1994–1999	Iraklis	110	(14)
1999–2005	AEK Athens	125	(22)
2005–2008	Ionikos	58	(5)
2008–2010	Panserraikos	46	(5)
2010–2011	Agrotikos Asteras	16	
2011–2015	Ethnikos Gazoros	60	(3)
2015–2017	Apollon Paralimnio		
2017–2018	Digenis Lakkomatos		
Total		415	(49)

International career
1998	Greece U21	3	(0)
1999	Greece	3	(0)
- * Club domestic league appearances and goals

Sotiris Konstantinidis (Greek: Σωτήρης Κωνσταντινίδης; born 19 April 1977) is a Greek former professional footballer who played as a forward. His nickname was "doctor" because he had been studying medicine.

== Club career ==
Konstantinidis started his career at Iraklis in 1994, where his good performances with the club, attracted the interest of AEK Athens and Olympiacos. The player negotiated in the last six months before the end of his contract his transfer to a team of his choice and he agreed with AEK. But the president of Iraklis, Petros Theodoridis wanted to sell him to Olympiacos, from whom he had an offer. The two sides ended up in the courts and Konstantinidis was left out of the squad for a few months. On 30 June 1999, the player was eventually vindicated and signed with AEK. His most important goal with AEK was the one against Olympiacos in the 2002 Greek Cup final. During his spell at the club, he won 3 Cups and a Greek Super Cup in 1996.

After his contract was expired Konstantinidis left and on 8 July 2005 signed for Ionikos. There he played for 3 years and afterwards he moved to Panserraikos. In 2010 he played a season at Agrotikos Asteras. He then went to Ethnikos Gazoros until 2015 when he signed at Apollon Paralimnio. In 2017 he moved to Digenis Lakkomatos, where he ended his career in 2018.

== International career ==
Konstantinidis was a member of Greece U21 team that reached the final of the 1998 UEFA European Under-21 Championship in Romania, where he played in all 3 games.

Konstantinidis also made three appearances for Greece during 1999.

== Honours ==
AEK Athens

- Greek Cup: 1999–2000, 2001–02

Individual

- Greek Cup top scorer: 2000–01
