= 2000–01 AEK Athens F.C. season =

AEK Athens
2000–01 season
- Chairman: Cornelius Sierhuis
- Manager: Giannis Pathiakakis (until 24 January); Toni Savevski
- Stadium: Nikos Goumas Stadium
- Alpha Ethniki: 3rd
- Greek Cup: Round of 16
- UEFA Cup: Round of 16
- Top goalscorer: League: Demis Nikolaidis (15); All: Demis Nikolaidis (25)
- Highest home attendance: 24,404 vs Barcelona (25 February 2001)
- Lowest home attendance: 676 vs Kozani (6 August 2000)
- Average home league attendance: 5,318
- Biggest win: AEK Athens 9–1 Olympiacos Volos; AEK Athens 8–0 Ethnikos Piraeus
- Biggest defeat: Olympiacos 6–1 AEK Athens; Barcelona 5–0 AEK Athens
Home colours	Away colours	Third colours

The 2000–01 season was the 77th season in the existence of AEK Athens F.C. and the 42nd consecutive season in the top flight of Greek football. They competed in the Alpha Ethniki, the Greek Cup and the UEFA Cup. The season began on 6 August 2000 and finished on 26 May 2001.

== Kits ==
Supplier: Nike
Sponsor(s): Marfin
Features: Samsung

Home	Away	Third

== Overview ==
The season started with the multinational companies NetMed and ENIC at the wheel, with Cornelius Sierhuis and Petros Stathis in charge. Giannis Pathiakakis, having finished the previous season strongly, took charge of the club's transfer activity, with a relatively good budget at his disposal. After a scouting trip to Latin America, he brought Fernando Navas, Emanuel Ruiz and Ferrugem to the club, but the biggest signings were those of Greek footballers. Vasilios Tsiartas returned from Sevilla after four years, while Theodoros Zagorakis returned from England to wear the colours of AEK Athens.

In the first round of the UEFA Cup, AEK were drawn against the Hungarian Vasas. At Ferenc Puskás Stadium, AEK appeared sluggish, but at the beginning of the second half, they came to life and quickly scored twice. However, their complacency returned later in the match, allowing Vasas to equalise with two goals in the final minutes. In the rematch at Nikos Goumas Stadium, AEK led by Maladenis who scored a goal and won a penalty that was converted by Nikolaidis made the 2–0 in the first half hour, which remained as the final score. The next opponent for the yellow-blacks were Herfølge from Denmark. In the first leg in Athens, Nikolaidis put on an outstanding performance, scoring four goals, while Zikos added another with a fine shot as AEK achieved an emphatic victory. In the second leg, the Danes took an early lead, with AEK equalising soon afterwards. In the second half, Herfølge regained the lead from the penalty spot and the match ended in a defeat for the Greek club. In the round of 32, AEK faced a much more difficult challenge, being drawn against Bayer Leverkusen, who were top of the Bundesliga. In the first match at BayArena, AEK took the lead early on, but then conceded two goals. However, AEK pressed and equalized, only for Bayer to regain the lead at 3–2. The yellow-blacks equalised again from the penalty spot and, in the 79th minute, took a 4–3 lead. Although the Germans continued to apply heavy pressure, AEK's defence held out until the final minutes, when they conceded an equaliser in a 4–4 draw. The rematch at Nikos Goumas Stadium on 7 December was an even more impressive night for AEK who scored at the beginning of the match, while in the second half they doubled their lead with a direct free kick, securing a memorable victory and one of the most important qualifications in the club's European history. In the round of 16, things became more difficult since AEK were drawn against Barcelona of Rivaldo, Kluivert, Overmars, Luis Enrique, Guardiola and De Boer. In the first leg at Nea Filadelfeia in a fantastic atmosphere, AEK stood up well, but a mistake by the defense in the 42nd minute was enough for Barcelona to open the score, which remained until the end of the match. In the rematch at Camp Nou, the Greek club entered strongly, but Barcelona did not panic and crushed the yellow-blacks with 5–0 and ended their European run.

In the Cup, AEK initially played in a group alongside Panathinaikos, AEL, Ethnikos Piraeus, Kozani and Olympiacos Volos, where they finished second behind Panathinaikos and advanced to the next round. There they were drawn against Olympiacos. The first leg that took place in Nea Filadelfeia, AEK started well and took the lead through Nikolaidis. However, the referee blew for a foul to a tackle by Zikos, where the ball ended up to Nikolaidis, went on to score another goal. Zikos protested and the referee sent him off with a second yellow. Amid the chaos that followed the referee expelled Nikolaidis as well with a straight red. With AEK down to nine men, Olympiacos equalised and the increasingly tense atmosphere in the stands grew more hostile, Petros Stathis made a decision that would mark the history of the club. Following a whispering by Stathis to Pathiakakis, three players of AEK fell down pretending to be injured. The ultras of AEK broke the barriers and invaded the pitch, resulting in the match being abandoned and the red and whites being awarded a 2–0 victory without a match. In the rematch Pathiakakis made a controversial decision, using a mixture of substitutes and regulars in the starting lineup in another nightmare evening for AEK, who suffered a 6–1 defeat. After the match, Pathiakakis left AEK.

In the league, AEK made a mediocre start, although their morale improved during their European campaign, particularly after their qualification against Bayer Leverkusen. The major problems, however, emerged with a 4–1 defeat to Olympiacos in the league, while AEK suffered another psychological blow with their eventual elimination from the Cup by the same opponents. After the departure of Pathiakakis, Toni Savevski retired as a footballer and he "overnight" took charge as the club's manager, forming a managerial duo with Eugène Gerards. However, AEK were unable to salvage much from the season, finishing in third place, 17 points from the top.

== Management team ==
Position	Staff
Manager	(North Macedonia) Toni Savevski
Assistant manager	(Netherlands) Eugène Gerards
Fitness Coach	(Greece) Nikolaos Karydas
Technical director	(Netherlands) Eugène Gerards
Academy director	(Greece) Andreas Stamatiadis
Academy manager	(Greece) Giorgos Karafeskos
Head of Medical	(Greece) Lakis Nikolaou

== Players ==
=== Squad information ===
NOTE: The players are the ones that have been announced by the AEK Athens' press release. No edits should be made unless a player arrival or exit is announced. Updated 26 May 2001, 23:59 UTC+3.

No.	Player	Nat.	Position(s)	Date of birth (Age)	Signed	Previous club	Transfer fee	Contract until
Goalkeepers
1	Ilias Atmatsidis (Captain)	(Greece)	GK	24 April 1969 (aged 32)	1992	(Greece) Pontioi Veria	₯40,000,000	2002
15	Chrysostomos Michailidis	(Greece)	GK	15 January 1975 (aged 26)	1997	(Greece) Eordaikos	Free	2005
22	Dionysis Chiotis	(Greece)	GK	4 June 1977 (aged 24)	1995	(Greece) AEK Athens U20	—	2005
Defenders
2	Traianos Dellas	(Greece)	CB	31 January 1976 (aged 25)	1999	(England) Sheffield United	Free	2002
3	Ferrugem	(Brazil)	CB / DM	6 October 1980 (aged 20)	2000	(Brazil) Palmeiras	Free	2005
5	Nikos Kostenoglou	(Greece)	CB / RB	3 October 1970 (aged 30)	1994	(Greece) Skoda Xanthi	₯70,000,000	2003
12	Charis Kopitsis	(Greece)	RB / RM / LB / LM	5 March 1969 (aged 32)	1992	(Greece) Panionios	Free	2001
16	Nikolaos Georgeas	(Greece)	RB / LB / DM	27 December 1976 (aged 24)	2001	(Greece) Kalamata	₯500,000,000	2004
17	Michalis Kasapis (Vice-captain 2)	(Greece)	LB / LM	6 August 1971 (aged 29)	1993	(Greece) Levadiakos	₯25,000,000	2002
19	Grigoris Toskas	(Greece)	CB	8 January 1983 (aged 18)	2000	(Greece) AEK Athens U20	—	2005
21	Vaios Karagiannis	(Greece)	LB / CB	25 June 1968 (aged 33)	1990	(Greece) A.O. Karditsa	₯11,000,000	2001
27	Hernán Medina	(Argentina)	CB / DM	5 September 1974 (aged 26)	2001	(Argentina) Boca Juniors	₯100,000,000	2001
31	Christos Pitos	(Greece)	CB / DM / CM	24 September 1979 (aged 21)	2001	(Greece) Naoussa	Free	2006
32	Michalis Kapsis	(Greece)	CB	18 October 1973 (aged 27)	1999	(Greece) Ethnikos Piraeus	₯80,000,000	2003
Midfielders
6	Theodoros Zagorakis	(Greece)	CM / DM / AM / RM / CB / RB	27 October 1971 (aged 29)	2000	(England) Leicester City	Free	2003
7	Christos Maladenis	(Greece)	CM / RM / LM / AM / DM / RW / LW / SS	23 May 1974 (aged 27)	1995	(Greece) Skoda Xanthi	₯100,000,000	2003
10	Vasilios Tsiartas (Vice-captain 3)	(Greece)	AM / RM / LM / SS	12 November 1972 (aged 28)	2000	(Spain) Sevilla	₯1,100,000,000	2003
14	Akis Zikos	(Greece)	DM / CM	1 June 1974 (aged 27)	1998	(Greece) Skoda Xanthi	₯130,000,000	2002
18	Giorgos Passios	(Greece) (Australia)	DM / CM / CB	4 May 1980 (aged 21)	1997	(Greece) AEK Athens U20	—	2003
23	Vasilios Lakis	(Greece)	RM / RW / AM / CM / RB	10 September 1976 (aged 24)	1998	(Greece) Paniliakos	₯320,000,000	2003
24	Dimitris Karameris	(Greece)	CM / DM	16 April 1983 (aged 18)	2000	(Greece) AEK Athens U20	—	2005
26	Bledar Kola	(Albania) (Greece)	LM / CM / DM / LB	1 August 1972 (aged 28)	2001	(Greece) Panathinaikos	Free	2003
28	Milen Petkov	(Bulgaria)	DM / CM / AM / RM / LM	12 January 1974 (aged 27)	2000	(Bulgaria) CSKA Sofia	₯260,000,000	2003
33	Fernando Navas	(Argentina)	LM / AM / RM	29 January 1977 (aged 24)	2000	(Argentina) Boca Juniors	₯700,000,000	2005
Forwards
9	Christos Kostis	(Greece)	SS / ST / AM / RW / LW	15 January 1972 (aged 29)	2000	(Belgium) Anderlecht	Free	2001
11	Demis Nikolaidis (Vice-captain)	(Greece) (Germany)	ST / SS	17 September 1973 (aged 27)	1996	(Greece) Apollon Athens	₯330,000,000	2004
20	Sotiris Konstantinidis	(Greece)	RW / LW / RM / LM / AM	19 April 1979 (aged 22)	1999	(Greece) Iraklis	Free	2004
30	Emanuel Ruiz	(Argentina)	SS / ST / RW	7 July 1978 (aged 22)	2000	(Argentina) Boca Juniors	Free	2005
Left during Winter Transfer Window
4	Diyan Donchev	(Bulgaria)	LB / CB	8 January 1974 (aged 27)	2000	(Bulgaria) Spartak Varna	₯200,000,000	2003
—	Georgios Paraskevaidis	(Greece)	CB	9 October 1982 (aged 18)	2000	(Greece) AEK Athens U20	—	2005
8	Toni Savevski	(North Macedonia)	CM / LM / DM	14 July 1963 (aged 37)	1988	(North Macedonia) Vardar	₯34,000,000	2001
25	Luis Darío Calvo	(Argentina)	AM / LW	10 October 1977 (aged 23)	2000	(Argentina) Banfield	Free	2002

== Transfers ==
=== In ===
==== Summer ====
No.	Pos.	Player	From	Fee	Date	Contract Until	Source
3	DF	(Brazil) Ferrugem	(Brazil) Palmeiras	Free transfer^{[a]}	11 July 2000	30 June 2005	
4	DF	(Bulgaria) Diyan Donchev	(Bulgaria) Spartak Varna	₯200,000,000	13 July 2000	30 June 2003	
6	MF	(Greece) Theodoros Zagorakis	(England) Leicester City	Free transfer	3 July 2000	30 June 2003	
9	FW	(Greece) Christos Kostis	(Belgium) Anderlecht	Free transfer	19 July 2000	30 June 2001	
10	MF	(Greece) Vasilios Tsiartas	(Spain) Sevilla	₯1,100,000,000	6 July 2000	30 June 2003	
19	DF	(Greece) Grigoris Toskas	(Greece) AEK Athens U20	Promotion	1 July 2000	30 June 2005	
22	GK	(Greece) Dionysis Chiotis	(Greece) Proodeftiki	Loan return	1 July 2000	30 June 2005	
24	MF	(Greece) Dimitris Karameris	(Greece) AEK Athens U20	Promotion	1 July 2000	30 June 2005	
30	FW	(Argentina) Emanuel Ruiz	(Argentina) Boca Juniors	Free transfer	4 July 2000	30 June 2005	
33	MF	(Argentina) Fernando Navas	(Argentina) Boca Juniors	₯700,000,000	4 July 2000	30 June 2005	
—	FW	(Greece) Giorgos Kartalis	(Greece) Ethnikos Piraeus	Loan return	1 July 2000	30 June 2001	
—	FW	(Greece) Georgios Trichias	(Greece) Athinaikos	Loan return	1 July 2000	31 December 2005	

==== Winter ====
No.	Pos.	Player	From	Fee	Date	Contract Until	Source
16	DF	(Greece) Nikolaos Georgeas	(Greece) Kalamata	₯500,000,000	17 January 2001	31 December 2004	
19	MF	(Albania) Bledar Kola	(Greece) Panathinaikos	Free transfer	19 January 2001	30 June 2004	
31	DF	(Greece) Christos Pitos	(Greece) Naoussa	₯5,500,000	16 January 2001	30 June 2006	
—	MF	(Bulgaria) Ivan Rusev	(Bulgaria) Spartak Varna	Free transfer	19 January 2001	30 June 2004	

=== Out ===
==== Summer ====
No.	Pos.	Player	To	Fee	Date	Source
6	MF	(Greece) Dimitris Markos	(Greece) Aris	Contract termination	27 June 2000	
9	FW	(Federal Republic of Yugoslavia) Nenad Bjeković	(Netherlands) Fortuna Sittard	Contract termination	31 July 2000	
10	MF	(Federal Republic of Yugoslavia) Dragan Ćirić	(Spain) Barcelona	Loan return	1 July 2000	
16	MF	(Iceland) Arnar Grétarsson	(Belgium) Lokeren	End of contract	1 July 2000	
18	MF	(Greece) Evripidis Katsavos	(Greece) OFI	Contract termination	5 July 2000	
24	MF	(Federal Republic of Yugoslavia) Vladimir Matijašević	(Federal Republic of Yugoslavia) Red Star	End of contract	1 July 2000	
25	DF	(Greece) Giannis Kalitzakis	(Greece) Ethnikos Asteras	End of contract	1 July 2000	
27	DF	(Italy) Filippo Dal Moro	(Italy) Roma	Loan return	1 July 2000	
29	DF	(Italy) Davide Belotti	(Italy) Vicenza	Loan return	1 July 2000	
30	MF	(Argentina) Pablo Cantero	(Argentina) Central Córdoba	Contract termination	1 July 2000	
—	MF	(Greece) Mattheos Platakis	(Greece) Apollon Kalamarias	End of contract	1 July 2000	

==== Winter ====
No.	Pos.	Player	To	Fee	Date	Source
4	DF	(Bulgaria) Diyan Donchev	(Bulgaria) Spartak Varna	Contract termination	19 January 2001	
8	MF	(North Macedonia) Toni Savevski	Retired		31 January 2001	

=== Loan in ===
==== Summer ====
No.	Pos.	Player	From	Fee	Date	Until	Option to buy	Source
25	MF	(Argentina) Luis Darío Calvo	(Argentina) Boca Juniors	Free	31 July 2000	30 June 2002	✓	

==== Winter ====
No.	Pos.	Player	From	Fee	Date	Until	Option to buy	Source
27	DF	(Argentina) Hernán Medina	(Argentina) Boca Juniors	₯100,000,000	25 January 2001	30 June 2001	✓	

=== Loan out ===
==== Summer ====
No.	Pos.	Player	To	Fee	Date	Until	Option to buy	Source
19	FW	(Cyprus) Giorgos Kavazis	(Greece) Kalamata	Free	18 July 2000	30 June 2001	✗	
22	GK	(Greece) Lefteris Petkaris	(Greece) Kilkisiakos	Free	18 July 2000	30 June 2001	✗	
31	FW	(Greece) Ilias Anastasakos	(Greece) Kalamata	Free	17 July 2000	30 June 2001	✗	
—	FW	(Greece) Giorgos Kartalis	(Greece) Agios Nikolaos	Free	17 July 2000	30 June 2001	✗	
—	FW	(Greece) Georgios Trichias	(Greece) Panetolikos	Free	1 July 2000	30 June 2001	✗	

==== Winter ====
No.	Pos.	Player	To	Fee	Date	Until	Option to buy	Source
25	MF	(Argentina) Luis Darío Calvo	(Greece) Kalamata	Free	29 January 2001	30 June 2001	✗	
—	DF	(Greece) Georgios Paraskevaidis	(Greece) Panionios	Free	1 January 2001	30 June 2001	✗	
—	MF	(Bulgaria) Ivan Rusev	(Greece) Athinaikos	Free	30 January 2001	30 June 2001	✗	

a. On 28 December 2001, FIFA awarded Palmeiras the fee of ₯650,000,000, as compensation, due to the player's free transfer upon his contract's expiration.

=== Contract renewals ===
No.	Pos.	Player	Date	Former Exp. Date	New Exp. Date	Source
15	GK	(Greece) Chrysostomos Michailidis	18 July 2000	30 June 2002	30 June 2005	
21	DF	(Greece) Vaios Karagiannis	18 July 2000	30 June 2000	30 June 2001	

=== Overall transfer activity ===
==== Expenditure ====
Summer: ▼ ₯2,650,000,000

Winter: ▼ ₯105,500,000

Total: ▼ ₯2,755,500,000

==== Income ====
Summer: ▲ ₯0

Winter: ▲ ₯0

Total: ▲ ₯0

==== Net Totals ====
Summer: ▼ ₯2,650,000,000

Winter: ▼ ₯105,500,000

Total: ▼ ₯2,755,500,000

== Pre-season and friendlies ==
21 July 2000 Friendly	Harkemase Boys	0–2	AEK Athens	Harkema
20:00 EEST (UTC+3)		Report	Tsiartas 25'; Nikolaidis 35'	Stadium: Sportpark De Bosk; Referee: Jiein Brekhuh (Netherlands)

23 July 2000 Friendly	Nijmegen	1–0	AEK Athens	Groesbeek
15:30 EEST (UTC+3)	Hristov 26'	Report		Stadium: Sportpark De Heikant; Attendance: 3,000; Referee: Ruud Bossen (Netherlands)

27 July 2000 Friendly	Heracles Almelo	0–2	AEK Athens	Herrenberg
20:00 EEST (UTC+3)		Report	Konstantinidis 17'; Nikolaidis 85'	Stadium: Volksbankstadion

31 July 2000 Friendly	Agioi Anargyroi	0–4	AEK Athens	Ano Liosia
18:30 EEST (UTC+3)		Report	Lakis 6'; Konstantinidis 25' (pen.); Maladenis 80'; Ruiz 90'	Stadium: Ano Liosia Municipal Stadium; Attendance: 2,500

4 August 2000 Nova Supersports Cup	AEK Athens	4–2	Rapid Wien	Nea Filadelfeia
21:00 EEST (UTC+3)	Tsiartas 25', 77'; Nikolaidis 30'; Kasapis 90' (pen.)	Report	Wagner 10'; Radovic 47' (pen.)	Stadium: Nikos Goumas Stadium; Attendance: 10,000; Referee: Giorgos Fasolis (Athens)

5 August 2000 Nova Supersports Cup	AEK Athens	2–3	Brescia	Nea Filadelfeia
21:00 EEST (UTC+3)	Tsiartas 14'; Nikolaidis 57'	Report	Del Nero (yellow card); Petruzzi (yellow card); Hübner 20', 28'; A. Filippini 76', (yellow card)	Stadium: Nikos Goumas Stadium; Attendance: 3,813; Referee: Dimitris Kalyvas (Boeotia)

21 August 2000 Friendly	AEK Athens	2–1	Atromitos	Nea Filadelfeia
18:00 EEST (UTC+3)	Nikolaidis (penalty missed) 15'; Tsiartas 42'; Dellas 53'	Report	Mitsis 62'	Stadium: Nikos Goumas Stadium; Referee: Kostas Finokaliotis (Athens)

24 August 2000 Friendly	Roma	0–0	AEK Athens	Rome
22:00 EEST (UTC+3)		Report		Stadium: Stadio Olimpico; Attendance: 67,705

3 September 2000 Friendly	AEK Athens	1–2	Espanyol	Nea Filadelfeia
21:00 EEST (UTC+3)	Nikolaidis 85'	Report	Nando (yellow card); Óscar 5'; Posse 42'	Stadium: Nikos Goumas Stadium; Attendance: 5,386; Referee: Giorgos Douros (Corinthia)

8 September 2000 Friendly	AEK Athens	2–1	Kalamata	Nea Filadelfeia
19:00 EEST (UTC+3)	Tsiartas 7', 41'	Report	Frantzeskos 32'	Stadium: Nikos Goumas Stadium; Referee: Giorgos Kasnaferis (Athens)
Note: The match started with a 55-minute delay, due to the referees' misinformation about the time of the match.

15 October 2000 Friendly	Atromitos	2–2	AEK Athens	Peristeri
16:00 EEST (UTC+3)	Pappas 47'; Balogiannis 81'	Report	Nikolaidis 5' (pen.); Konstantinidis 87'	Stadium: Peristeri Stadium; Attendance: 500; Referee: Giorgos Kasnaferis (Athens)

18 October 2000 Friendly	AEK Athens	3–0	Egaleo	Nea Filadelfeia
21:00 EEST (UTC+3)	Tsiartas 35' (pen.); Navas 62', 79'	Report		Stadium: Nikos Goumas Stadium; Referee: Pavlos Papilias (Piraeus)

21 October 2000 Friendly	AEK Athens	3–4	Proodeftiki	Nea Filadelfeia
20:00 EEST (UTC+3)	Konstantinidis 15'; Nikolaidis 20'; Tsiartas 30'	Report	Pantios 54'; Makor 61', 75' (pen.); Piliouras 80'	Stadium: Nikos Goumas Stadium; Referee: Filippos Dovas (Phthiotis)

31 January 2001 Friendly	AEK Athens	3–0	Atromitos	Thrakomakedones
17:00 EET	Nikolaidis 8'; Medina 33' (pen.), 66'	Report		Stadium: AEK Athens' training complex Referee: Kostas Finokaliotis (Athens)
Note: 70-minute match.

6 February 2001 Friendly	AEK Athens	1–1	Panelefsiniakos	Thrakomakedones
15:00 EET	Medina 15'	Report	Brilis 75'	Stadium: AEK Athens' training complex Referee: Spyros Voulgaris (Piraeus)
Note: 80-minute match.

== Competitions ==
=== Overall record ===
Competition	First match	Last match	Starting round	Final position	Record							
Competition	First match	Last match	Starting round	Final position	Pld	W	D	L	GF	GA	GD	Win %
Alpha Ethniki	18 September 2000	26 May 2001	Matchday 1	3rd	30	19	4	7	61	34	+27	63.33
Greek Cup	6 August 2000	24 January 2001	Group stage	Round of 16	12	8	1	3	39	18	+21	66.67
UEFA Cup	12 September 2000	22 February 2001	First round	Fourth round	8	3	2	3	16	14	+2	37.50
Total					50	30	7	13	116	66	+50	60.00

Last updated: 26 May 2001
Source: Competitions

=== Alpha Ethniki ===
==== League table ====
Pos	Team	Pld	W	D	L	GF	GA	GD	Pts	Qualification or relegation
1	Olympiacos (C)	30	25	3	2	84	22	+62	78	Qualification for Champions League first group stage
2	Panathinaikos	30	20	6	4	61	20	+41	66	Qualification for Champions League third qualifying round
3	AEK Athens	30	19	4	7	61	34	+27	61	Qualification for UEFA Cup qualifying round
4	PAOK	30	14	9	7	66	48	+18	51	Qualification for UEFA Cup first round (Note: PAOK were qualified for first round of the 2001–02 UEFA Cup as Greek Football Cup winners.)
5	Iraklis	30	14	4	12	45	40	+5	46	

Source: Galanis Sports Data
Rules for classification: 1) Points; 2) Head-to-head points; 3) Head-to-head goal difference; 4) Goal difference; 5) Goals scored; 6) Goals against; 7) Play-offs (neutral ground); 8) Draw.
(Note: Criterion 7 is only used if needed to decide champion, teams for relegation or teams for UEFA competitions).
(C) Champions

==== Results summary ====
Overall								Home						Away					
Pld	W	D	L	GF	GA	GD	Pts	W	D	L	GF	GA	GD	W	D	L	GF	GA	GD
30	19	4	7	61	34	+27	61	11	2	2	35	16	+19	8	2	5	26	18	+8

Source: Competitive matches

==== Results by Matchday ====
Round	1	2	3	4	5	6	7	8	9	10	11	12	13	14	15	16	17	18	19	20	21	22	23	24	25	26	27	28	29	30
Ground	H	A	H	A	A	H	A	H	A	H	A	H	H	A	H	A	H	A	H	H	A	H	A	H	A	H	A	A	H	A
Result	W	W	D	W	L	W	L	W	L	W	D	W	D	L	W	W	W	W	W	L	L	W	D	W	W	L	W	W	W	W
Position	2	2	2	2	4	2	6	4	5	3	4	3	3	6	5	4	3	3	3	3	4	3	3	3	3	3	3	3	3	3

Source: Competitive matches
A = Away; H = Home; W = Win; D = Draw; L = Loss; P = Postponed

==== Matches ====
18 September 2000 1	AEK Athens	2–0	Iraklis	Nea Filadelfeia
20:45 EEST (UTC+3)	Nikolaidis 43', 80'; Kapsis (yellow card) 65'; Tsiartas (yellow card) 90+1'		Haxhi (yellow card) 17'; Smet (yellow card) 23'	Stadium: Nikos Goumas Stadium; Attendance: 13,012; Referee: Makis Efthimiadis (Drama)

24 September 2000 2	Athinaikos	0–3	AEK Athens	Nea Smyrni
19:30 EEST (UTC+3)	Zavantias (yellow card) 26'; Tsironis (yellow card) 43'; Buyse (yellow card) 77'		Ruiz 20', 35', (yellow card) 75'; Petkov 80'; Dellas (yellow card) 90+3'	Stadium: Nea Smyrni Stadium; Attendance: 4,188; Referee: Christos Daglis (Thessaloniki)

1 October 2000 3	AEK Athens	2–2	Ethnikos Asteras	Nea Filadelfeia
19:00 EEST (UTC+3)	Kapsis 37'; Nikolaidis 44'; Ferrugem (yellow card) 74'		Kastaniotis (yellow card) 32'; Alexoudis 54'; Kalitzakis (yellow card) 59'; Thomaidis (yellow card) 69', (goal) 87'; Podaras (yellow card) 71'; Marinakis (yellow card) 90+1'	Stadium: Nikos Goumas Stadium; Attendance: 4,741; Referee: Panagiotis Nikou (Imathia)

29 October 2000 4	Ionikos	0–2	AEK Athens	Nikaia
17:00 EET (UTC+2)	Muchotrigo (yellow card) 32'; Kobayashi (yellow card) 66'; Delgado (yellow card) 84'		Zikos (yellow card) 29'; Nikolaidis (yellow card) 59'; Tsiartas 82'; Kasapis 90'	Stadium: Nikaia Municipal Stadium; Attendance: 3,573; Referee: Manolis Giannadakis (Lasithi)

4 November 2000 5	Olympiacos	4–1	AEK Athens	Marousi
19:00 EET (UTC+2)	Đorđević (penalty missed) 7', 77'; Poursanidis (yellow card) 15' (yellow-red card) 44'; Giovanni 19'; Zé Elias (yellow card) 25'; Niniadis (yellow card) 38', (goal) 52'; Álvez 63', (yellow card) 64'		Zikos (yellow card) 5'; Nikolaidis 10', (yellow card) 35'; Kasapis (yellow card) 21'; Navas (yellow card) 33' (yellow-red card) 42'; Atmatsidis (yellow card) 37'; Ferrugem (yellow card) 74'	Stadium: Olympic Stadium; Attendance: 26,138; Referee: Giorgos Tsangarakis (Chania)

12 November 2000 6	AEK Athens	2–1	Panachaiki	Nea Filadelfeia
17:00 EET (UTC+2)	Kapsis (yellow card) 30'; Tsiartas 39'; Ruiz 41'; Nikolaidis (penalty missed) 90'		Lignos (yellow card) 33'; Papadopoulos 87'	Stadium: Nikos Goumas Stadium; Attendance: 3,886; Referee: Giorgos Borovilos (Arcadia)

19 November 2000 7	Kalamata	3–1	AEK Athens	Kalamata
19:00 EET (UTC+2)	Soares 13'; Kalogiannidis (yellow card) 24' (yellow-red card) 61'; Gantzoudis (yellow card) 29'; Kapetanopoulos (yellow card) 29'; Boateng 59'; Frantzeskos 70'		Kapsis (yellow card) 32'; Zikos 83'; Ferrugem (yellow card) 84'	Stadium: Messiniakos Stadium; Attendance: 1,710; Referee: Stavros Flotsios (Boeotia)

27 November 2000 8	AEK Athens	4–2	PAS Giannina	Nea Filadelfeia
16:00 EET (UTC+2)	Dellas 26'; Nikolaidis 29'; Konstantinidis 73', 82'		Garozis 4'; Kormaris 64'; Noulis (yellow card) 90+2'	Stadium: Nikos Goumas Stadium; Attendance: 2,699; Referee: Spyros Voulgaris (Piraeus)

2 December 2000 9	Panionios	2–0	AEK Athens	Nea Smyrni
19:00 EET (UTC+2)	Gonias 27' (pen.); Préget (yellow card) 32', (goal) 41'; Kljajević (yellow card) 48'; Efthymiadis (yellow card) 83'		Ferrugem (yellow card) 27'; Kapsis (yellow card) 35'; Kasapis (yellow card) 90'	Stadium: Nea Smyrni Stadium; Attendance: 2,169; Referee: Thanasis Briakos (Epirus)

10 December 2000 10	AEK Athens	3–1	Aris	Nea Filadelfeia
17:00 EET (UTC+2)	Tsiartas 28' (pen.); Nikolaidis 40', 71'; Kostenoglou (yellow card) 41'		Kyzeridis 19', (yellow card) 20'; Koltsidas (yellow card) 29'; Karaliopoulos (yellow card) 37'	Stadium: Nikos Goumas Stadium; Attendance: 8,072; Referee: Kostas Vallianos (Aetoloacarnania)

18 December 2000 11	OFI	3–3	AEK Athens	Heraklion
17:00 EET (UTC+2)	Silva 11'; Ipirotis 14'; Muñoz 32'; Beqaj (yellow card) 66'		Kostenoglou 20'; Maladenis (yellow card) 42', (goal) 84'; Tsiartas 67' (pen.)	Stadium: Theodoros Vardinogiannis Stadium; Attendance: 3,696; Referee: Giorgos Tsangarakis (Chania)

3 January 2001 12	AEK Athens	2–1	Paniliakos	Nea Filadelfeia
16:00 EET (UTC+2)	Navas 42', 45'; Zikos (yellow card) 61'		Moschogiannis (yellow card) 25'; Koltzos (yellow card) 63'; Dedes 76'	Stadium: Nikos Goumas Stadium; Attendance: 4,567; Referee: Thanasis Briakos (Epirus)

7 January 2001 13	AEK Athens	1–1	Panathinaikos	Nea Filadelfeia
19:00 EET (UTC+2)	Konstantinidis (yellow card) 77'; Tsiartas 90+2' (pen.); Petkov (yellow card) 90+3'		Šarić (yellow card) 19'; Liberopoulos 28'; Karagounis (yellow card) 30'; Koutsoures (yellow card) 54'; Goumas (yellow card) 59'; Fyssas (yellow card) 90+1'	Stadium: Nikos Goumas Stadium; Attendance: 12,301; Referee: Giorgos Kasnaferis (Athens)

14 January 2001 14	PAOK	2–1	AEK Athens	Thessaloniki
19:00 EET (UTC+2)	Engomitis (yellow card) 15'; Frousos 50', 80' (pen.); Tetradze (yellow card) 82'; Katsabis (yellow card) 88'		Karagiannis (yellow card) 11'; Zagorakis (yellow card) 28'; Ruiz 36', (yellow card) 49'; Kostenoglou (yellow card) 63'; Atmatsidis (yellow card) 79'; Petkov (yellow card) 81'	Stadium: Toumba Stadium; Attendance: 7,058; Referee: Spyros Papadakos (Laconia)

21 January 2001 15	AEK Athens	2–0	Skoda Xanthi	Nea Filadelfeia
17:00 EET (UTC+2)	Maladenis 4'; Zagorakis (yellow card) 37'; Tsiartas 71'; Zikos (yellow card) 90+1'		Janočko (penalty missed) 20'; Sfakianakis (yellow card) 32'; Prittas (yellow card) 73'	Stadium: Nikos Goumas Stadium; Attendance: 3,589; Referee: Theofilaktos Papapanagiotou (Piraeus)
Note: Last league game for the manager Pathiakakis and the last match for Toni Saveski, who replaced him at the team's bench.

28 January 2001 16	Iraklis	1–2	AEK Athens	Thessaloniki
19:00 EET (UTC+2)	Hagan (yellow card) 42'; Milojević (yellow card) 68'; Fofonka 79'		Dellas (yellow card) 31'; Kopitsis (yellow card) 49'; Lakis 60'; Petkov (yellow card) 70'; Ruiz 83', (yellow card) 84'	Stadium: Kaftanzoglio Stadium; Attendance: 7,519; Referee: Giorgos Borovilos (Arcadia)

5 February 2001 17	AEK Athens	2–1	Athinaikos	Nea Filadelfeia
15:00 EET (UTC+2)	Kostenoglou (yellow card) 35'; Tsiartas 37'; Zikos 43'; Karagiannis (yellow card) 87'		Touré 4'; Simons (yellow card) 56'	Stadium: Nikos Goumas Stadium; Attendance: 4,101; Referee: Pavlos Papilias (Piraeus)

11 February 2001 18	Ethnikos Asteras	0–3	AEK Athens	Kaisariani
16:00 EET (UTC+2)	Lagos (yellow card) 22'; Benali (yellow card) 27'; Mimpo (yellow card) 31' (yellow-red card) 65'		Zikos (yellow card) 28'; Petkov 39'; Tsiartas 55' (pen.); Nikolaidis 66'; Maladenis (yellow card) 67'	Stadium: Michalis Kritikopoulos Stadium; Attendance: 3,980; Referee: Kyros Vassaras (Thessaloniki)

18 February 2001 19	AEK Athens	2–0	Ionikos	Alexandroupoli
15:00 EET (UTC+2)	Petkov (yellow card) 15'; Kasapis (yellow card) 20'; Kola (yellow card) 22'; Nikolaidis 46', 81'		Daraklitsas (yellow card) 21'; Afash (yellow card) 71'; Mikes (yellow card) 90+3'	Stadium: Alexandroupoli Municipal Stadium; Attendance: 3,319; Referee: Giorgos Douros (Corinthia)
Note: The match was held at Alexandroupoli Stadium because AEK were punished with 3 games away from home for fan invasion during the Cup game against Olympiacos.

26 February 2001 20	AEK Athens	1–2	Olympiacos	Heraklion
15:00 EET (UTC+2)	Petkov (yellow card) 8'; Karagiannis (yellow card) 33'; Tsiartas 36'; Lakis (yellow card) 37' (yellow-red card) 90+3'; Zagorakis (yellow card) 55'		Giannakopoulos (yellow card) 5', (goal) 19'; Anatolakis (yellow card) 11' (yellow-red card) 88'; Đorđević 28'; Niniadis (yellow card) 67'; Poursanidis (yellow card) 90+1'	Stadium: Theodoros Vardinogiannis Stadium; Attendance: 4,836; Referee: Paraskevas Chelis (Kavala)

5 March 2001 21	Panachaiki	1–0	AEK Athens	Patras
17:00 EET (UTC+2)	Katsouranis (yellow card) 31'; Solakis 35' (pen.); Epalle (yellow card) 53' (yellow-red card) 82'; Kordonouris (yellow card) 86'; Vavilis (yellow card) 90+3'		Michailidis (red card) 33'; Tsiartas (yellow card) 45+2'; Kola (yellow card) 55'; Kopitsis (red card) 62'; Maladenis (yellow card) 70'	Stadium: Kostas Davourlis Stadium; Attendance: 2,743; Referee: Spyros Voulgaris (Piraeus)

12 March 2001 22	AEK Athens	3–0	Kalamata	Rhodes
15:00 EET (UTC+2)	Zagorakis 17'; Tsiartas 51' (pen.), (yellow card) 67'; Kostis 80'		Kappos (yellow card) 6'; Troupkos (yellow card) 23' (yellow-red card) 50'; Bachramis (yellow card) 49'; Oliveira (yellow card) 55'	Stadium: Diagoras Stadium; Attendance: 1,250; Referee: Paraskevas Chelis (Kavala)

19 March 2001 23	PAS Giannina	2–2	AEK Athens	Ioannina
16:00 EET (UTC+2)	Ramírez (yellow card) 11'; Semos (yellow card) 14'; Kakos (yellow card) 67'; Bletsas (yellow card) 69'; Kormaris 74'; Bellaj (yellow card) 76'; Kebadze 90+4'		Kapsis (yellow card) 23'; Nikolaidis 37', 77', (penalty missed) 77', (yellow card) 80'; Zagorakis (yellow card) 44'; Georgeas (yellow card) 71'; Zikos (yellow card) 80'	Stadium: Zosimades Stadium; Attendance: 5,393; Referee: Giorgos Borovilos (Arcadia)

1 April 2001 24	AEK Athens	5–1	Panionios	Nea Filadelfeia
17:00 EEST (UTC+3)	Lérant 7' (o.g.); Tsiartas 10' (pen.); Konstantinidis 44', 57', 80'; Kostenoglou (yellow card) 70'		Sakellaridis (yellow card) 6'; Efthymiadis (yellow card) 9'; Roberts 34'; Lérant (yellow card) 36'	Stadium: Nikos Goumas Stadium; Attendance: 2,858; Referee: Christoforos Zografos (Athens)

7 April 2001 25	Aris	0–3	AEK Athens	Thessaloniki
19:00 EEST (UTC+3)	Koltsidas (yellow card) 34'; El Karkouri (yellow card) 69'; Ivić (yellow card) 80'		Nikolaidis 16'; Maladenis (yellow card) 20'; Kasapis (yellow card) 45'; Kostenoglou (yellow card) 56'; Petkov 81', 84'	Stadium: Aris Stadium; Attendance: 3,482; Referee: Paraskevas Chelis (Kavala)

22 April 2001 26	AEK Athens	1–2	OFI	Nea Filadelfeia
17:30 EEST (UTC+3)	Konstantinidis 45'		Kiassos 36', 85'; Muñoz (yellow card) 58' (yellow-red card) 78'; Simos (yellow card) 68'	Stadium: Nikos Goumas Stadium; Attendance: 4,467; Referee: Dimitris Pontikis (Thessaloniki)

29 April 2001 27	Paniliakos	0–3	AEK Athens	Pyrgos
17:30 EEST (UTC+3)	Koltzos (yellow card) 37' (yellow-red card) 50'; Nousias (yellow card) 41'		Tsiartas 41'; Lakis (yellow card) 62', (goal) 75'; Petkov (yellow card) 71'; Konstantinidis 89'	Stadium: Pyrgos Stadium; Attendance: 3,442; Referee: Giorgos Tsangarakis (Chania)

7 May 2001 28	Panathinaikos	0–1	AEK Athens	Ampelokipoi
17:30 EEST (UTC+3)	Olivares (yellow card) 27'; Goumas (yellow card) 73'; Liberopoulos (yellow card) 86'		Dellas (yellow card) 22'; Nikolaidis 77'; Petkov (yellow card) 82'	Stadium: Leoforos Alexandras Stadium; Attendance: 4,109; Referee: Kyros Vassaras (Thessaloniki)

19 May 2001 29	AEK Athens	3–2	PAOK	Nea Filadelfeia
19:00 EEST (UTC+3)	Tsiartas 13' (pen.); Nikolaidis 26'; Georgeas (yellow card) 36'; Konstantinidis 65'; Karagiannis (yellow card) 79'		Covic (yellow card) 12'; Borbokis 35'; Koulakiotis (yellow card) 38'; Udeze (yellow card) 40'; Spasić 43'	Stadium: Nikos Goumas Stadium; Attendance: 6,070; Referee: Paraskevas Chelis (Kavala)

26 May 2001 30	Skoda Xanthi	0–1	AEK Athens	Xanthi
17:00 EEST (UTC+3)	Kechagias (yellow card) 62'; Zapropoulos (yellow card) 82'		Kostis (yellow card) 44'; Karagiannis (yellow card) 49'; Maladenis (yellow card) 62'; Zikos (yellow card) 69'; Tsiartas 88'	Stadium: A.O. Xanthi Stadium; Attendance: 934; Referee: Spyros Voulgaris (Piraeus)

=== Greek Cup ===
==== Group 6 ====
Pos	Team	Pld	W	D	L	GF	GA	GD	Pts	Qualification	PAO	AEK	AEL	ETP	KOZ	OLV
1	Panathinaikos	10	9	0	1	25	7	+18	27	Round of 16		2–1	3–1	1–0	3–0	4–1
2	AEK Athens	10	8	1	1	38	10	+28	25	Round of 16	3–1		1–0	8–0	5–2	9–1
3	AEL	10	3	2	5	10	13	−3	11		0–2	2–2		1–2	2–1	2–0
4	Ethnikos Piraeus	10	3	1	6	10	23	−13	10		0–3	0–3	0–1		2–1	3–1
5	Kozani	10	2	2	6	13	23	−10	8		1–3	1–4	1–1	1–1		2–0
6	Olympiacos Volos	10	2	0	8	10	30	−20	6		0–3	1–2	1–0	3–2	2–3	

Source: epo.gr

==== Matches ====
6 August 2000 1	AEK Athens	5–2	Kozani	Nea Filadelfeia
21:00 EEST (UTC+3)	Konstantinidis 43', 65'; Lakis 44', 68', 86'; Nikolaidis (penalty missed) 55'	Report (page 30)	Kaounos 7'; Vettas (yellow card) 39'; Teliadis 52'	Stadium: Nikos Goumas Stadium; Attendance: 676; Referee: Antonis Vassaras (Thessaloniki)

9 August 2000 2	Olympiacos Volos	1–2	AEK Athens	Volos
21:00 EEST (UTC+3)	Veletanis 45+1', (yellow card); Denelavas (yellow card) 57'; Manda (yellow card) 85'	Report (page 31)	Dellas (yellow card); Zikos (yellow card) 42'; Konstantinidis 48'; Ruiz 75', (yellow card) 83'	Stadium: Volos Municipal Stadium; Attendance: 2,900; Referee: Giorgos Borovilos (Arcadia)

13 August 2000 3	Panathinaikos	2–1	AEK Athens	Marousi
21:00 EEST (UTC+3)	Vlaović (yellow card) 23'; Sypniewski 35'; Šarić (yellow card) 55'; Vokolos 79'	Report (page 31)	Tsiartas 55' (pen.); Petkov (yellow card) 72'; Dellas (yellow card) 78'	Stadium: Olympic Stadium; Attendance: 6,490; Referee: Kostas Finokaliotis (Athens)

17 August 2000 4	AEK Athens	8–0	Ethnikos Piraeus	Nea Filadelfeia
21:00 EEST (UTC+3)	Karagiannis (yellow card) 1'; Donchev (yellow card) 1'; Navas 28', 41'; Nikolaidis 34' (pen.), 62', 65', 76'; Konstantinidis 86', 89'	Report (page 32)	Kotsis (yellow card) 1'	Stadium: Nikos Goumas Stadium; Attendance: 1,063; Referee: Giorgos Tsangarakis (Chania)

30 August 2000 5	AEK Athens	1–0	AEL	Nea Filadelfeia
21:30 EEST (UTC+3)	Kapsis (yellow card) 1'; Calvo 61'	Report (page 32)	Gench (yellow card) 1'; Ziagas (yellow card) 1'	Stadium: Nikos Goumas Stadium; Attendance: 770; Referee: Dimitris Pontikis (Thessaloniki)

28 August 2000 6	Kozani	1–4	AEK Athens	Kozani
18:45 EEST (UTC+3)	M. Papadopoulos (yellow card) 1'; Marcelo (yellow card) 1'; Vettas (yellow card) 1'; Th. Papadopoulos (yellow card) 1'; Kaounos 58'	Report (page 33)	Navas (yellow card) 1'; Kopitsis (yellow card) 1'; Dellas (yellow card) 1'; Kasapis (penalty missed) 9'; Konstantinidis 15'; Calvo 59'; Navas 61'; Maladenis 76'	Stadium: Kozani Stadium; Attendance: 10,000; Referee: Panagiotis Nikou (Imathia)

6 September 2000 7	AEK Athens	9–1	Olympiacos Volos	Nea Filadelfeia
18:30 EEST (UTC+3)	Zikos (yellow card); Maladenis 5', 37'; Lakis 36', 52', 73'; Tsiartas 40', 80'; Konstantinidis 47', 57'	Report (page 33-34)	Vlachoudis (yellow card); Perišić (yellow card); Manda 75'	Stadium: Nikos Goumas Stadium; Attendance: 1,016; Referee: Manolis Giannadakis (Lasithi)

29 November 2000 8	AEK Athens	3–1	Panathinaikos	Nea Filadelfeia
19:45 EET (UTC+2)	Maladenis (yellow card); Kostis 28'; Konstantinidis 33', 71'	Report (page 34)	Basinas (yellow card); Kola (yellow card); Sigurðsson 10'	Stadium: Nikos Goumas Stadium; Attendance: 1,309; Referee: Stavros Flotsios (Boeotia)

13 December 2000 9	Ethnikos Piraeus	0–3	AEK Athens	Kaisariani
19:30 EET (UTC+2)		Report (page 34)	Calvo 7', 37'; Konstantinidis 11'	Stadium: Michalis Kritikopoulos Stadium; Referee: Kiriakos Voutsalas (Thessaloniki)

9 October 2000 10	AEL	2–2	AEK Athens	Larissa
18:00 EEST (UTC+3)	Kontothanasis (yellow card) 18'; Gench 60'; Tsianakas (yellow card) 68'; Kantimiris 86', (yellow card) 86'	Report (page 35)	Ruiz 44'; Kopitsis (yellow card) 60'; Kostis 81'; Kostenoglou (yellow card) 87'	Stadium: Alcazar Stadium; Attendance: 545; Referee: Thanasis Briakos (Epirus)

===== Round of 16 =====
10 January 2001 First leg	AEK Athens	0–2 (Awarded)	Olympiacos	Nea Filadelfeia
20:00 EET (UTC+2)	Zikos (yellow card) (yellow-red card) 52'; Petkov (yellow card); Nikolaidis 46', (red card) 53'; Karagiannis (yellow card) 57'	Report (page 48)	Zé Elias (yellow card); Poursanidis (yellow card); Anatolakis (yellow card); Niniadis 67'	Stadium: Nikos Goumas Stadium; Attendance: 20,000; Referee: Dimitris Pontikis (Thessaloniki)
Note: At the 52nd minute, while AEK were leading by 1–0, the referee awarded a foul on a clean tackle by Zikos where the ball ended up to Nikolaidis who came out one-on-one with the opposing goalkeeper to make the score 2–0. Zikos protested calmly, but Pontikis showed him a second yellow and expelled him. Then chaos was created and in the midst of that situation, the referee expelled Nikolaidis as well, with a straight red. As AEK played with 9 men, Olympiacos equalized and with an electrified atmosphere, Petros Stathis whispered something to Pathiakakis and 3 AEK players fell down right then and there pretending to be injured. At the same time, AEK ultras invaded the pitch, resulting in the suspension of the match in the 72nd minute and the 0–2 win without a match for Olympiacos.

24 January 2001 Second leg	Olympiacos	6–1 (8–1 agg.)	AEK Athens	Marousi
20:00 EEST (UTC+3)	Georgatos 5'; Giovanni 22', 32'; Ofori-Quaye 52'; Álvez 79'; Giannakopoulos 84'	Report (page 50)	Maladenis 25'; Kopitsis (yellow card) 76'	Stadium: Olympic Stadium; Attendance: 11,925; Referee: Makis Efthimiadis (Drama)

=== UEFA Cup ===
==== First round ====
12 September 2000 First leg	Vasas (Hungary)	2–2	(Greece) AEK Athens	Budapest, Hungary
19:00 EEST (UTC+3)	Kabát (yellow card) 60'; Pető 89'; Komódi 90'	Report	Pető 47' (o.g.); Nikolaidis 50'; Zagorakis (yellow card) 51'; Petkov (yellow card) 69'; Navas (yellow card) 85'	Stadium: Ferenc Puskás Stadium; Attendance: 2,500; Referee: Martin Ingvarsson (Sweden)

28 September 2000 Second leg	AEK Athens (Greece)	2–0 (4–2 agg.)	(Hungary) Vasas	Athens, Greece
21:00 EEST (UTC+3)	Maladenis 27'; Nikolaidis 30'	Report	Simek (yellow card) 48'; Kabát (yellow card) 57'	Stadium: Nikos Goumas Stadium; Attendance: 11,200; Referee: Serguei Goussev (Russia)

==== Second round ====
26 October 2000 First leg	AEK Athens (Greece)	5–0	(Denmark) Herfølge	Athens, Greece
20:00 EEST (UTC+3)	Nikolaidis 48', 53', 64', 75'; Zikos 61'	Report	Kastrup (yellow card) 17'	Stadium: Nikos Goumas Stadium; Attendance: 9,075; Referee: Paul Allaerts (Belgium)

7 November 2000 Second leg	Herfølge (Denmark)	2–1 (2–6 agg.)	(Greece) AEK Athens	Herfølge, Denmark
19:00 EET (UTC+2)	Jakobsen 1'; Heyde (yellow card) 26'; Kastrup (yellow card) 35'; Hermansen 47' (pen.); Hoyer (yellow card) 54'; Mikkelsen (yellow card) 66'; Lübbers (yellow card) 68'; Thomsen (yellow card) 75'	Report	Ferrugem (yellow card) 9'; Petkov 33'; Zikos (yellow card) 60'; Tsiartas (penalty missed) 67', (yellow card) 70'	Stadium: Herfølge Stadion; Attendance: 1,645; Referee: Paulo Paraty (Portugal)

==== Third round ====
23 November 2000 First leg	Bayer Leverkusen (Germany)	4–4	(Greece) AEK Athens	Leverkusen, Germany
20:15 EET (UTC+2)	Živković (yellow card) 13'; Kirsten 24', 43'; Kovač 48'; Ramelow 90'	Report	Ruiz (yellow card) 2'; Lakis 5'; Navas 46', 79'; Tsiartas 55' (pen.); Ferrugem (yellow card) 56'	Stadium: BayArena; Attendance: 22,500; Referee: Terje Hauge (Norway)

7 December 2000 Second leg	AEK Athens (Greece)	2–0 (6–4 agg.)	(Germany) Bayer Leverkusen	Athens, Greece
15:00 EET (UTC+2)	Navas 16'; Lakis (yellow card) 36'; Tsiartas 50'	Report	Kirsten (yellow card) 30'; Neuendorf (yellow card) 40'	Stadium: Nikos Goumas Stadium; Attendance: 20,700; Referee: Arturo Daudén Ibáñez (Spain)

==== Fourth round ====
15 February 2001 First leg	AEK Athens (Greece)	0–1	(Spain) Barcelona	Athens, Greece
21:30 EET (UTC+2)	Kostenoglou (yellow card) 20'; Zagorakis (yellow card) 57'	Report	Abelardo (yellow card) 30'; Luis Enrique 41'; Barjuán (yellow card) 78'	Stadium: Nikos Goumas Stadium; Attendance: 24,404; Referee: Graham Poll (England)

22 February 2001 Second leg	Barcelona (Spain)	5–0 (6–0 agg.)	(Greece) AEK Athens	Barcelona, Spain
22:00 EET (UTC+2)	Luis Enrique 22', 31', 60'; Rivaldo 57'; Gabri (yellow card) 84'; Gerard 87' (pen.); Kluivert (yellow card) 89'	Report	Zikos (yellow card) 24'; Kapsis (red card) 28'; Kostenoglou (yellow card) 37'; Atmatsidis (yellow card) 39'	Stadium: Camp Nou; Attendance: 33,623; Referee: Stefano Braschi (Italy)

== Statistics ==
=== Squad statistics ===
As of 26 May 2001

No.	Pos	Player	Alpha Ethniki		Greek Cup		UEFA Cup		Total	
No.	Pos	Player	Apps	Goals	Apps	Goals	Apps	Goals	Apps	Goals
Goalkeepers
1	GK	(Greece) Ilias Atmatsidis	25	0	9	0	8	0	42	0
15	GK	(Greece) Chrysostomos Michailidis	3	0	4	0	0	0	7	0
22	GK	(Greece) Dionysis Chiotis	3	0	1	0	0	0	4	0
Defenders
2	DF	(Greece) Traianos Dellas	19	1	10	0	3	0	32	1
3	DF	(Brazil) Ferrugem	22	0	5	0	6	0	33	0
5	DF	(Greece) Nikos Kostenoglou	19	1	10	0	5	0	34	1
12	DF	(Greece) Charis Kopitsis	6	0	11	0	2	0	19	0
16	DF	(Greece) Nikolaos Georgeas	9	0	0	0	0	0	9	0
17	DF	(Greece) Michalis Kasapis	24	1	9	0	8	0	41	1
19	DF	(Greece) Grigoris Toskas	0	0	2	0	0	0	2	0
21	DF	(Greece) Vaios Karagiannis	7	0	7	0	1	0	15	0
27	DF	(Argentina) Hernán Medina	2	0	0	0	0	0	2	0
—	DF	(Greece) Christos Pitos	1	0	1	0	0	0	2	0
32	DF	(Greece) Michalis Kapsis	25	1	8	0	7	0	40	1
Midfielders
6	MF	(Greece) Theodoros Zagorakis	23	1	5	0	7	0	35	1
7	MF	(Greece) Christos Maladenis	26	2	8	4	6	1	40	7
10	MF	(Greece) Vasilios Tsiartas	27	14	3	3	8	2	38	19
14	MF	(Greece) Akis Zikos	23	2	6	0	8	1	37	3
18	MF	(Greece) Giorgos Passios	0	0	3	0	0	0	3	0
23	MF	(Greece) Vasilios Lakis	28	2	7	6	8	1	43	9
24	MF	(Greece) Dimitris Karameris	0	0	2	0	0	0	2	0
26	MF	(Albania) Bledar Kola	9	0	1	0	0	0	10	0
28	MF	(Bulgaria) Milen Petkov	22	4	7	0	6	1	35	5
33	MF	(Argentina) Fernando Navas	10	2	5	3	6	3	21	8
Forwards
9	FW	(Greece) Christos Kostis	7	1	5	2	0	0	12	3
11	FW	(Greece) Demis Nikolaidis	25	15	4	5	8	6	37	26
20	FW	(Greece) Sotiris Konstantinidis	22	8	11	11	4	0	37	19
30	FW	(Argentina) Emanuel Ruiz	23	5	9	2	7	0	39	7
Left during Winter Transfer Window
4	DF	(Bulgaria) Diyan Donchev	1	0	5	0	0	0	6	0
—	DF	(Greece) Georgios Paraskevaidis	0	0	0	0	0	0	0	0
8	MF	(North Macedonia) Toni Savevski	3	0	8	0	1	0	12	0
25	MF	(Argentina) Luis Darío Calvo	1	0	8	4	0	0	9	4

=== Goalscorers ===
As of 26 May 2001
The list is sorted by competition order when total goals are equal, then by position and then by squad number.

Rank	No.	Pos.	Player	Alpha Ethniki	Greek Cup	UEFA Cup	Total
1	11	FW	(Greece) Demis Nikolaidis	15	4	6	25
2	10	MF	(Greece) Vasilios Tsiartas	14	3	2	19
2	20	FW	(Greece) Sotiris Konstantinidis	8	11	0	19
4	23	MF	(Greece) Vasilios Lakis	2	6	1	9
5	33	MF	(Argentina) Fernando Navas	2	3	3	8
6	30	FW	(Argentina) Emanuel Ruiz	5	2	0	7
6	7	MF	(Greece) Christos Maladenis	2	4	1	7
8	28	MF	(Bulgaria) Milen Petkov	4	0	1	5
9	25	MF	(Argentina) Luis Darío Calvo	0	4	0	4
10	14	MF	(Greece) Akis Zikos	2	0	1	3
10	9	FW	(Greece) Christos Kostis	1	2	0	3
12	2	DF	(Greece) Traianos Dellas	1	0	0	1
12	5	DF	(Greece) Nikos Kostenoglou	1	0	0	1
12	32	DF	(Greece) Michalis Kapsis	1	0	0	1
12	17	DF	(Greece) Michalis Kasapis	1	0	0	1
12	6	MF	(Greece) Theodoros Zagorakis	1	0	0	1
Own goals				1	0	1	2
Totals				61	40	16	112

=== Hat-tricks ===
Numbers in superscript represent the goals that the player scored.

Player	Against	Result	Date	Competition	Source
(Greece) Sotiris Konstantinidis	(Greece) Kozani	5–2 (H)	6 August 2000	Greek Cup	
(Greece) Demis Nikolaidis^{4}	(Greece) Ethnikos Piraeus	8–0 (H)	17 August 2000	Greek Cup	
(Greece) Vasilios Lakis	(Greece) Olympiacos Volos	9–1 (H)	6 September 2000	Greek Cup	
(Greece) Demis Nikolaidis^{4}	(Norway) Herfølge	5–0 (H)	26 October 2000	UEFA Cup	
(Greece) Sotiris Konstantinidis	(Greece) Panionios	5–1 (H)	1 April 2001	Alpha Ethniki	

=== Assists ===
As of 26 May 2001
The list is sorted by competition order when total assists are equal, then by position and then by squad number.

Rank	No.	Pos.	Player	Alpha Ethniki	Greek Cup	UEFA Cup	Total
1	10	MF	(Greece) Vasilios Tsiartas	18	4	4	26
2	17	DF	(Greece) Michalis Kasapis	3	1	3	7
3	30	FW	(Argentina) Emanuel Ruiz	3	2	1	6
4	11	FW	(Greece) Demis Nikolaidis	4	1	0	5
4	23	MF	(Greece) Vasilios Lakis	3	2	0	5
6	20	FW	(Greece) Sotiris Konstantinidis	3	1	0	4
6	7	MF	(Greece) Christos Maladenis	2	2	0	4
6	33	MF	(Argentina) Fernando Navas	1	2	1	4
9	8	MF	(North Macedonia) Toni Savevski	0	3	0	3
10	25	MF	(Argentina) Luis Darío Calvo	0	2	0	2
11	14	MF	(Greece) Akis Zikos	1	0	0	1
11	3	DF	(Brazil) Ferrugem	0	1	0	1
11	12	DF	(Greece) Charis Kopitsis	0	1	0	1
11	4	DF	(Bulgaria) Diyan Donchev	0	1	0	1
11	19	MF	(Albania) Bledar Kola	0	1	0	1
Totals				38	24	9	71

=== Clean sheets ===
As of 26 May 2001
The list is sorted by competition order when total clean sheets are equal and then by squad number. Clean sheets in games where both goalkeepers participated are awarded to the goalkeeper who started the game. Goalkeepers with no appearances are not included.

Rank	No.	Player	Alpha Ethniki	Greek Cup	UEFA Cup	Total
1	1	(Greece) Ilias Atmatsidis	9	2	3	14
2	22	(Greece) Dionysis Chiotis	2	0	0	2
3	15	(Greece) Chrysostomos Michailidis	0	1	0	1
Totals			11	3	3	17

=== Disciplinary record ===
As of 26 May 2001

N	P	Nat.	Name	Alpha Ethniki			Greek Cup			UEFA Cup			Total			Notes
N	P	Nat.	Name	Yellow card	Second yellow card	Red card	Yellow card	Second yellow card	Red card	Yellow card	Second yellow card	Red card	Yellow card	Second yellow card	Red card	Notes
Goalkeepers
1	GK	(Greece)	Ilias Atmatsidis	2						1			3			
15	GK	(Greece)	Chrysostomos Michailidis			1									1	
22	GK	(Greece)	Dionysis Chiotis													
Defenders
2	DF	(Greece)	Traianos Dellas	3			3						6			
3	DF	(Brazil)	Ferrugem	4						1			5			
5	DF	(Greece)	Nikos Kostenoglou	5			1			2			8			
12	DF	(Greece)	Charis Kopitsis	1		1	3						4		1	
16	DF	(Greece)	Nikolaos Georgeas	2									2			
17	DF	(Greece)	Michalis Kasapis	4									4			
19	DF	(Greece)	Grigoris Toskas													
21	DF	(Greece)	Vaios Karagiannis	5			1						6			
27	DF	(Argentina)	Hernán Medina													
31	DF	(Greece)	Christos Pitos													
32	DF	(Greece)	Michalis Kapsis	5			1					1	6		1	
Midfielders
6	MF	(Greece)	Theodoros Zagorakis	4						1			5			
7	MF	(Greece)	Christos Maladenis	5			1						6			
10	MF	(Greece)	Vasilios Tsiartas	3									3			
14	MF	(Greece)	Akis Zikos	7			3	1		1			11	1		
18	MF	(Greece)	Giorgos Passios													
23	MF	(Greece)	Vasilios Lakis	2	1					1			3	1		
24	MF	(Greece)	Dimitris Karameris													
26	MF	(Albania)	Bledar Kola	2									2			
28	MF	(Bulgaria)	Milen Petkov	7			2			1			10			
33	MF	(Argentina)	Fernando Navas	1	1		1			1			3	1		
Forwards
9	FW	(Greece)	Christos Kostis				1						1			
11	FW	(Greece)	Demis Nikolaidis	3					1				3		1	
20	FW	(Greece)	Sotiris Konstantinidis	1									1			
30	FW	(Argentina)	Emanuel Ruiz	3			1			1			5			
Left during Winter Transfer window
4	DF	(Bulgaria)	Diyan Donchev	1									1			
—	DF	(Greece)	Georgios Paraskevaidis													
8	MF	(North Macedonia)	Toni Savevski													
25	MF	(Argentina)	Luis Darío Calvo													

=== Starting 11 ===
This section presents the most frequently used formation along with the players with the most starts across all competitions.

N.	Formation	Matchday(s)
38	4–4–2 (D)	1–10, 12, 13, 17–22, 25–29
12	4–2–3–1	11, 14–16, 23, 24, 30

No.	Nat.	Player	Pos.
1	(Greece)	Ilias Atmatsidis (C)	GK
5	(Greece)	Nikos Kostenoglou	RCB
32	(Greece)	Michalis Kapsis	LCB
6	(Greece)	Theodoros Zagorakis	RB
17	(Greece)	Michalis Kasapis	LB
14	(Greece)	Akis Zikos	DM
28	(Bulgaria)	Milen Petkov	RCM
7	(Greece)	Christos Maladenis	LCM
23	(Greece)	Vasilios Lakis	AM
10	(Greece)	Vasilios Tsiartas	SS
11	(Greece)	Demis Nikolaidis	CF

Last updated: 2001-05-26

== Awards ==
Player	Pos.	Award	Source
(Greece) Sotiris Konstantinidis	FW	Greek Cup Top Scorer (shared)	
