= Nova Supersports Cup =

- Founded: 1999
- Abolished: 2002
- Region: Europe
- Teams: 11
- Last champions: (Italy) Bologna (1st title)
- Most championships: (Greece) AEK Athens (Italy) Bologna (Italy) Brescia (1 title)

The Nova Supersports Cup was an association football friendly tournament competition hosted by Greek premium sports network Nova Sports between 1999 and 2001, held in Athens.

The inaugural tournament took place from July 31 to August 1, 1999, featuring Leicester City from the English Premier League, Hertha Berlin from the German Bundesliga, as well as Iraklis and AEK Athens from the Greek Alpha Ethniki, with AEK Athens emerging as the tournament champion. The second tournament took place from August 4 to 5, 2000, featuring the Greek Alpha Ethniki club AEK Athens, Werder Bremen from the German Bundesliga, Rapid Wien from the Austrian Bundesliga, and Brescia from the Italian Serie A, which ultimately emerged as the tournament winner. The final tournament took place on August 3, 2001, featuring AEK Athens from Greece's Alpha Ethniki, Sevilla from Spain's La Liga, and Bologna from Italy's Serie A, with Bologna emerging as the champion of the event.

== Venue ==
All the games were played at the Nikos Goumas Stadium a 27,729-seat multi-use venue, home ground of hosts AEK Athens. The ground was demolished in June 2003.

== Results ==
=== By year ===
Year	Venue	Winners	Runners-up	3rd place	4th place
1999	NGS, Athens	(Greece) AEK Athens	(Germany) Hertha Berlin	(England) Leicester City	(Greece) Iraklis
2000	NGS, Athens	(Italy) Brescia	(Greece) AEK Athens	(Germany) Werder Bremen	(Austria) Rapid Wien
2001	NGS, Athens	(Italy) Bologna	(Greece) AEK Athens	(Spain) Sevilla	

=== By club ===
Club	Winners	Runners-up	Years won	Years runner-up
(Greece) AEK Athens	1	2	1999	2000, 2001
(Italy) Brescia	1	0	2000	–
(Italy) Bologna	1	0	2001	–
(Germany) Hertha Berlin	0	1	–	1999

=== By nation ===
Country	Winners	Runners-up	Winning clubs	Runners-up
Italy	2	0	Brescia (1), Bologna (1)	–
Greece	1	2	AEK Athens (1)	AEK Athens (2)
Germany	0	1	–	Hertha Berlin (1)

Last updated: 6 December 2023.
Source: The Rec.Sport.Soccer Statistics Foundation

== Bibliography ==
- Συλλογικό έργο (2014). 90 ΧΡΟΝΙΑ, Η ΙΣΤΟΡΙΑ ΤΗΣ ΑΕΚ (in Greek). Αθήνα, Ελλάδα: Εκδοτικός Οίκος Α. Α. Λιβάνη. ISBN 978-960-14-2802-4.
- Παναγιωτακόπουλος, Παναγιώτης (2021). 1963-2021 Η ΕΥΡΩΠΑΪΚΗ ΙΣΤΟΡΙΑ ΤΗΣ Α.Ε.Κ. ΜΕΣΑ ΑΠΟ ΤΑ ΕΙΣΙΤΗΡΙΑ ΤΩΝ ΑΓΩΝΩΝ: το ταξίδι συνεχίζεται...!!! (in Greek). Αθήνα, Ελλάδα: ISBN 978-618-00-2832-4.
- Παναγιωτακόπουλος, Παναγιώτης (2022). 1979-2003 ΤΟ ΤΑΞΙΔΙ ΣΥΝΕΧΙΖΕΤΑΙ...Νο2: Οι επίσημοι αγώνες της Α.Ε.Κ. στο Ναό μέσα από τα εισιτήρια των αγώνων (in Greek). Αθήνα, Ελλάδα: ISBN 978-618-00-3993-1.
- Παναγιωτακόπουλος, Παναγιώτης (2023). 100 ΧΡΟΝΙΑ Α.Ε.Κ. - 100 ΣΤΙΓΜΕΣ ΔΟΞΑΣ μέσα από τα εισιτήρια των αγώνων: Το Ταξίδι Συνεχίζεται...!!! Νο3 (in Greek). Αθήνα, Ελλάδα: ISBN 978-618-00-4636-6.
