= Hernán Medina (footballer) =

Argentine footballer and manager (born 1974)

Hernan Medina
Personal information
- Full name: Hernan Esteban Medina
- Date of birth: 5 September 1974 (age 52)
- Place of birth: Córdoba, Argentina
- Position: Defender

Team information
- Current team: Victoria (manager)

Senior career*
Years	Team	Apps	(Gls)
1998–2000	Belgrano	59	(10)
2000–2001	Boca Juniors	7	(0)
2001	→ AEK Athens (loan)	2	(0)
2001–2002	Lorient	7	(1)
2002–2004	Olimpo	31	(2)
2004–2005	Belgrano		
2005–2006	Alumni	29	(2)
2007	San José		
2007	Estudiantes Rio Cuarto	5	(0)
2008	Deportivo Maipú	19	(0)
2009	Gimnasia Mendoza	11	(2)
2010	Sportivo Patria	2	(0)
2011	Flor de Ceibo		
2012	General Paz Juniors	9	(0)

Managerial career
- 2019–2022: Racing de Córdoba
- 2022–2023: Motagua
- 2023: Victoria
- 2024: Marathón
- 2025: Racing de Córdoba
- 2026–: Victoria
- * Club domestic league appearances and goals

Hernan Medina (born 5 September 1974 in Argentina) is an Argentine retired footballer, who played as a defender and a manager at Victoria. He was nicknamed "La Tota".

== Club career ==
Medina started his career in 1998 at Belgrano. His performances at the club earned him a move to Boca Juniors in 2000.

On 25 January 2001, Medina was loaned to the Greek side AEK Athens for a fee of 100 million drachmas with a buy-out option after the end of the season. After his unsuccessful spell in Greece, he moved to France and played for Lorient for season.

Afterwards, Medina returned to Argentina, playing successively for Olimpo, Belgrano and Alumni. In 2007 he moved to Bolivia and signed for San José for a while and returned to Argentina playing for Estudiantes Rio Cuarto, Deportivo Maipú, Gimnasia Mendoza, Sportivo Patria and Flor de Ceibo. He finished his career at General Paz Juniors in 2012.
