= 2001 Nova Supersports Cup =

Tournament details
- Host country: Greece
- Dates: 3 August
- Teams: 3 (from 1 confederation)
- Venue: 1 (in 1 host city)

Final positions
- Champions: (Italy) Bologna (1st title)

Tournament statistics
- Matches played: 3
- Goals scored: 4 (1.33 per match)
- Top scorer(s): (Greece) Demis Nikolaidis (Italy) Carlo Nervo (Spain) Tomás Hervás (1 goal each)

The 2001 Nova Supersports Cup was an association football friendly tournament competition hosted by Greek premium sports network Nova Sports in 2001, held in Athens.

The tournament occurred on 3 August 2001 with the participation of Greek Alpha Ethniki club AEK Athens, Sevilla from the La Liga and Bologna from the Serie A, which eventually won the tournament.

== Teams ==
The teams who accepted the invitation are:

- (Greece) AEK Athens – Alpha Ethniki (host)
- (Spain) Sevilla – La Liga
- (Italy) Bologna – Serie A

Last updated: 6 December 2023.
Source: The Rec.Sport.Soccer Statistics Foundation

== Venue ==
All the games were played at the Nikos Goumas Stadium a 27,729-seat multi-use venue, home ground of hosts AEK Athens. The ground was demolished in June 2003.

== Matches ==
3 August 2001
19:30 EET, UTC+02:00

Bologna (Italy)	1–1	(Spain) Sevilla
Vera 24' (o.g.)		Tomás 44' (pen.)
Penalties
Signori (penalty scored); Cruz (penalty scored); Womé (penalty scored); Brighi (penalty missed); Olive (penalty scored)	4–5	(penalty scored) Tomás; (penalty scored) Reyes; (penalty scored) Castedo; (penalty scored) Gil; (penalty scored) Cotelo

Nikos Goumas Stadium, Athens
Referee: Georgios Borovilos (Greece)
3 August 2001
20:30 EET, UTC+02:00

AEK Athens (Greece)	1–0	(Spain) Sevilla
Nikolaidis 23'	Report

Nikos Goumas Stadium, Athens
Attendance: ?
Referee: Georgios Borovilos (Greece)
3 August 2001
21:30 EET, UTC+02:00

AEK Athens (Greece)	0–1	(Italy) Bologna
	Report	Nervo 2'

Nikos Goumas Stadium, Athens
Referee: Georgios Borovilos (Greece)

== Table ==
Pos	Team	Pld	W	D	L	GF	GA	GD	Pts
1	(Italy) Bologna	2	1	1	0	2	1	+1	4
2	(Greece) AEK Athens	2	1	0	1	1	1	0	3
3	(Spain) Sevilla	2	0	1	1	1	2	−1	1

Source: The Rec.Sport.Soccer Statistics Foundation

== Results ==
Year	Venue	Winner	Runners-up	3rd place
2001	Nikos Goumas Stadium	(Italy) Bologna	(Greece) AEK Athens	(Spain) Sevilla

Last updated: 6 December 2023.
Source: The Rec.Sport.Soccer Statistics Foundation

== Scorers ==
Name	Club	Goals
(Greece) Demis Nikolaidis	AEK Athens	1
(Italy) Carlo Nervo	Bologna	1
(Spain) Tomás Hervás	Sevilla	1

Nova Supersports Cup
2001 Winners

Bologna
First Title

== Bibliography ==
- Συλλογικό έργο (2014). 90 ΧΡΟΝΙΑ, Η ΙΣΤΟΡΙΑ ΤΗΣ ΑΕΚ (in Greek). Αθήνα, Ελλάδα: Εκδοτικός Οίκος Α. Α. Λιβάνη. ISBN 978-960-14-2802-4.
- Παναγιωτακόπουλος, Παναγιώτης (2021). 1963-2021 Η ΕΥΡΩΠΑΪΚΗ ΙΣΤΟΡΙΑ ΤΗΣ Α.Ε.Κ. ΜΕΣΑ ΑΠΟ ΤΑ ΕΙΣΙΤΗΡΙΑ ΤΩΝ ΑΓΩΝΩΝ: το ταξίδι συνεχίζεται...!!! (in Greek). Αθήνα, Ελλάδα: ISBN 978-618-00-2832-4.
- Παναγιωτακόπουλος, Παναγιώτης (2022). 1979-2003 ΤΟ ΤΑΞΙΔΙ ΣΥΝΕΧΙΖΕΤΑΙ...Νο2: Οι επίσημοι αγώνες της Α.Ε.Κ. στο Ναό μέσα από τα εισιτήρια των αγώνων (in Greek). Αθήνα, Ελλάδα: ISBN 978-618-00-3993-1.
- Παναγιωτακόπουλος, Παναγιώτης (2023). 100 ΧΡΟΝΙΑ Α.Ε.Κ. - 100 ΣΤΙΓΜΕΣ ΔΟΞΑΣ μέσα από τα εισιτήρια των αγώνων: Το Ταξίδι Συνεχίζεται...!!! Νο3 (in Greek). Αθήνα, Ελλάδα: ISBN 978-618-00-4636-6.
