= CD Victoria =

Spanish football club

Victoria
- Full name: Club Deportivo Victoria
- Founded: 1954; 2015 (refounded)
- Ground: Estadio Municipal, Tazacorte, Canary Islands, Spain
- Capacity: 5,000
- Chairman: (Spain) David Genaro
- Manager: (Spain) Nesmel Acosta
- League: Interinsular Preferente
- 2024–25: Primera Interinsular – Group 3, 1st of 8 (champions)
Home colours	Away colours

Club Deportivo Victoria is a Spanish football team based in Tazacorte, in the autonomous community of Canary Islands. Founded in 1954, it plays in Interinsular Preferente, holding home games at Estadio Municipal de Tazacorte, with a capacity of 5,000 seats.

== History ==
- Club Deportivo Victoria (1954–2012; 2023–)
- Escuela de Fútbol El Cano (2015–2017)
- Escuela de Fútbol José Martín El Cano (2017–2023)

== Season to season ==
Season	Tier	Division	Place	Copa del Rey
1954–55	5	2ª Reg.	3rd	
1955–56	4	1ª Reg.	5th	
1956–57	4	1ª Reg.	2nd	
1957–58	4	1ª Reg.	6th	
1958–59	4	1ª Reg.	7th	
1959–60	4	1ª Reg.	8th	
1960–61	5	2ª Reg.		
1961–62	4	1ª Reg.	4th	
1962–63	DNP			
1963–64	DNP			
1964–65	DNP			
1965–66	5	2ª Reg.	5th	
1966–67	5	2ª Reg.	2nd	
1967–68	5	2ª Reg.	3rd	
1968–69	5	2ª Reg.	3rd	
1969–70	5	2ª Reg.	1st	
1970–71	5	2ª Reg.	4th	
1971–72	5	2ª Reg.	2nd	
1972–73	5	2ª Reg.	2nd	
1973–74	5	2ª Reg.	1st	

Season	Tier	Division	Place	Copa del Rey
1974–75	5	2ª Reg.	2nd	
1975–76	5	2ª Reg.	2nd	
1976–77	5	2ª Reg.	1st	
1977–78	6	1ª Reg.	8th	
1978–79	6	1ª Reg.	6th	
1979–80	6	1ª Reg.	10th	
1980–81	5	Reg. Pref.	6th	
1981–82	5	Reg. Pref.	6th	
1982–83	5	Reg. Pref.	3rd	
1983–84	5	Terr. Pref.	2nd	
1984–85	4	3ª	20th	
1985–86	5	Terr. Pref.	12th	
1986–87	5	Terr. Pref.	6th	
1987–88	5	Terr. Pref.	11th	
1988–89	5	Terr. Pref.	10th	
1989–90	5	Terr. Pref.	16th	
1990–91	6	1ª Terr.	4th	
1991–92	6	1ª Terr.	1st	
1992–93	5	Int. Pref.	7th	
1993–94	5	Int. Pref.	5th	

Season	Tier	Division	Place	Copa del Rey
1994–95	5	Int. Pref.	1st	
1995–96	4	3ª	8th	
1996–97	4	3ª	10th	
1997–98	4	3ª	6th	
1998–99	4	3ª	17th	
1999–2000	4	3ª	8th	
2000–01	4	3ª	13th	
2001–02	4	3ª	16th	
2002–03	4	3ª	10th	
2003–04	4	3ª	19th	
2004–05	5	Int. Pref.	4th	
2005–06	5	Int. Pref.	8th	
2006–07	5	Int. Pref.	3rd	
2007–08	4	3ª	11th	
2008–09	4	3ª	12th	
2009–10	4	3ª	17th	
2010–11	4	3ª	17th	
2011–12	5	Int. Pref.	17th	
2012–13	DNP			
2013–14	DNP			

Season	Tier	Division	Place	Copa del Rey
2014–15	DNP			
2015–16	5	Int. Pref.	3rd	
2016–17	5	Int. Pref.	5th	
2017–18	5	Int. Pref.	2nd	
2018–19	5	Int. Pref.	3rd	
2019–20	5	Int. Pref.	3rd	
2020–21	5	Int. Pref.	1st	
2021–22	6	Int. Pref.	6th	
2022–23	6	Int. Pref.	16th	
2023–24	7	1ª Int.	2nd	
2024–25	7	1ª Int.	1st	
2025–26	6	Int. Pref.		

- 14 seasons in Tercera División

== Famous players ==
- (Togo) Aziz
