= Panagiotis Efthymiadis =

Greek footballer (born in 1975)

Personal information
- Date of birth: 12 April 1975 (age 51)
- Place of birth: Katerini, Greece
- Height: 1.85 m (6 ft 1 in)
- Position: Defender

Senior career*
Years	Team	Apps	(Gls)
1994–1998	Pierikos		
1998–1999	Austria Lustenau		
1999–2000	Panegialios		
2000–2002	Panionios		
2002–2004	Akratitos		
2004–2005	Paniliakos		
2005–2007	Proodeftiki		
2007–2008	Olympiacos Volos		
2008–2009	Eordaikos		
2009–2010	Veria		
2010–2011	Anagennisi Epanomi		
2011–2013	Achilleas Neokaisareia		
2013	Vataniakos		
- * Club domestic league appearances and goals

Panagiotis Efthymiadis (Greek: Παναγιώτης Ευθυμιάδης; born 12 April 1975) is a retired Greek football defender.
