= Diyan Donchev =

Bulgarian footballer

Personal information
- Full name: Diyan Donchev Donchev
- Date of birth: 8 January 1974 (age 52)
- Place of birth: Varna, Bulgaria
- Height: 1.78 m (5 ft 10 in)
- Position: Defender

Senior career*
Years	Team	Apps	(Gls)
1992–2000	Spartak Varna	117	(12)
1995	→ Cherno More (loan)	12	(3)
2000–2001	AEK Athens	1	(0)
2001	Spartak Varna	31	(2)
2001	Lokomotiv Sofia	7	(0)
2002	Spartak Varna	25	(0)
2003	Cherno More	4	(0)
2003–2008	Lokomotiv Sofia	112	(0)
2008–2009	Spartak Varna	12	(0)
2009–2010	Sportist Svoge	15	(0)
2010	Dorostol 2003	14	(0)
2011–2012	Spartak Varna	27	(0)
Total		377	(17)

International career
1999	Bulgaria	1	(0)
- * Club domestic league appearances and goals

Diyan Donchev (Bulgarian: Диян Дончев; born 8 January 1974 in Varna) is a former Bulgarian footballer. As a player, he was a defender and midfielder from 1992 to 2012. He was capped once for the Bulgarian team in 1999.

== Club career ==
Donchev started his career in 1992 at Spartak Varna. In 1992 he was loaned to Cherno More. On 13 July 2000 he was transferred to the Greek side AEK Athens for a fee of 200 million drachmas. He failed to establish in the club of Athens and on 19 January 2001 his contract was terminated, which resulted in his return to Spartak Varna. Afterwards he moved to Lokomotiv Sofia for a short period before retirning to Spartak in 2002. He continuted his career with another spell at Cherno More and Lokomotiv Sofia. In 2008 he signed for Sportist Svoge for a season and then for Dorostol Silistra for another. He finished his career at Spartak Varna in 2012.

== International career ==
In March 1999 the Bulgarian national coach Dimitar Dimitrov called Donchev in Bulgaria national football team for friendly match against Ukraine. Diyan made his debut, but the result of the match was a 0–1 loss for Bulgaria.
