= Emanuel Ruiz =

Argentine footballer

Personal information
- Full name: Emanuel Diego Salvador Ruiz
- Date of birth: 7 July 1978 (age 48)
- Place of birth: Buenos Aires, Argentina
- Height: 1.76 m (5 ft 9 1/2 in)
- Positions: Striker; right winger

Youth career
- 1992–1995: Argentinos Juniors
- 1996–1997: Boca Juniors

Senior career*
Years	Team	Apps	(Gls)
1997–2000	Boca Juniors		
1998–1999	→Rosario Central (loan)		
2000–2002	AEK Athens	23	(5)
2001–2002	→ Union Santa Fe (loan)	30	(4)
2003	Talleres	6	(0)
2003–2004	Nueva Chicago	8	(0)
2004	Toluca		
2004–2005	Defensores de Belgrano		
2005–2007	RCD España		
2007–2008	San Lorenzo de Luján		
2008–2009	Hapoel Nir Ramat HaSharon		
2009–2010	Cienciano	8	(0)
- * Club domestic league appearances and goals as of 29 July 2016

Emanuel Diego Salvador Ruiz (born 7 July 1978) is a former Argentine professional footballer, who played as a striker.

== Club career ==
Ruiz began his career in the youth sectors of Argentinos Juniors, being transferred with a group of youth footballers amongst them, Juan Roman Riquelme to Boca Juniors in 1996. On 10 August 1997 he made his debut with the first team the following year under Hector Veira in a 4–3 win over Rosario Central. However, he had no place at that time within the team and was loaned one year to Rosario Central, where he wasn't a first team regular either. In 1999, he returned to Boca, and this time under Carlos Bianchi's command, to have continuity in the main squad.

On 4 July 2000 Ruiz was transferred to the Greek club AEK Athens, alongside his teammate Fernando Navas, as choices of the manager, Giannis Pathiakakis. After spending a mediocre season in Greece failing to satisfy the clubs management, on 22 August 2001 he was loaned to Union Santa Fe. In the summer of 2002 his contract with AEK was terminated and since then, he played for Talleres, Nueva Chicago, Toluca, RCD España and San Lorenzo de Luján.

In 2008, he left for Israel by the club Hapoel Nir to play in the 2nd division of the country. Then in the middle of the following year, the club Cienciano of Cuzco, where he played 8 matches not having a good performance. In January 2010, he joined everything was on track to become player San José however, a problem in his right knee prevented him from successfully pass medical exams and he did not sign for Bolivian club. After that incident and failing to sign for any club, he retired at the age of 31.

== After football ==
In 2014 Ruiz created football academies in Argentina giving them the name of the club that gave him the chance to play in Europe, "AEK FC".
