= Ekrem Gench =

Bulgarian footballer

Ekrem Genç
Personal information
- Date of birth: 1 July 1974 (age 52)
- Place of birth: Bulgaria

Ekrem Genç (Bulgarian: Екрем Генч; born 1 July 1974) is a former Bulgarian footballer.

== Biography ==
Over the course of his career, Genç represented Arda Kardzhali, FC Chirpan, Etar 1924 and Beroe. During the 1997/1998 season in the A PFG he also played for CSKA Sofia.
