= Darío Delgado (footballer, born 1969) =

Uruguayan footballer

Personal information
- Full name: Ruben Darío Delgado Temesio
- Date of birth: 3 December 1969 (age 56)
- Place of birth: Durazno, Uruguay
- Height: 1.75 m (5 ft 9 in)
- Position: Midfielder

Senior career*
Years	Team	Apps	(Gls)
1989–1996	Montevideo Wanderers		
1996	Albacete Balompié	3	(0)
1997	Guaraní		
1998	Danubio		
1999	Rampla Juniors		
2000	Rentistas		
2000–2003	Ionikos	85	(7)
2003–2004	Fostiras		
2004–2007	La Luz		

International career
1994	Uruguay	1	(0)
- * Club domestic league appearances and goals

Ruben Darío Delgado Temesio (born December 3, 1969), known as Darío Delgado, is a former Uruguayan footballer. He was born in Durazno.

== Club career ==
Delgado spent most of his career in Uruguay playing for Montevideo Wanderers in the Primera División Uruguaya. He also had a spell with Ionikos in Greece, where he went a few months without being paid.

== International career ==
Delgado made one appearance for the senior Uruguay national football team in 1994: a friendly match against Peru (0-1 win) in the Estadio Nacional José Díaz in Lima, Peru. He was a substitute for Marcelo Otero in the 69th minute.
