= 2000 Nova Supersports Cup =

Tournament details
- Host country: Greece
- Dates: 4–5 August
- Teams: 4 (from 1 confederation)
- Venue: 1 (in 1 host city)

Final positions
- Champions: (Italy) Brescia (1st title)

Tournament statistics
- Matches played: 4
- Goals scored: 19 (4.75 per match)
- Top scorer: (Greece) Vasilios Tsiartas (3 goals)

The 2000 Nova Supersports Cup was an association football friendly tournament competition hosted by Greek premium sports network Nova Sports in 2000, held in Athens.

The tournament occurred between 4 and 5 August 2000 with the participation of Greek Alpha Ethniki club AEK Athens, Werder Bremen from the Bundesliga, Rapid Wien from the Austrian Bundesliga and Brescia from the Serie A, which eventually won the tournament.

== Teams ==
The teams who accepted the invitation are:

- (Greece) AEK Athens – Alpha Ethniki (host)
- (Austria) Rapid Wien – Austrian Bundesliga
- (Italy) Brescia – Serie A
- (Germany) Werder Bremen – Bundesliga

Last updated: 6 December 2023.
Source: The Rec.Sport.Soccer Statistics Foundation

== Venue ==
All the games were played at the Nikos Goumas Stadium a 27,729-seat multi-use venue, home ground of hosts AEK Athens. The ground was demolished in June 2003.

== Matches ==
=== Semi-finals ===
4 August 2000
19:00 EET (UTC+2)

Brescia (Italy)	4–0	(Germany) Werder Bremen
Răducioiu 26'; Hübner 37'; González 66', 90'

Nikos Goumas Stadium, Athens
4 August 2000
20:00 EET (UTC+2)

AEK Athens (Greece)	4–2	(Austria) Rapid Wien
Tsiartas 25', 77'; Nikolaidis 30'; Kasapis 90' (pen.)	Report	Wagner 10'; Radovic 47' (pen.)

Nikos Goumas Stadium, Athens
Attendance: 10,000
Referee: Giorgos Fasolis (Greece)

=== Match for third place ===
5 August 2000
19:00 EET (UTC+2)

Werder Bremen (Germany)	4–0	(Austria) Rapid Wien
Bogdanović 23'; Bode 24'; Stalteri 42'; Herzog 74'

Nikos Goumas Stadium, Athens

=== Final ===
5 August 2000
20:00 EET (UTC+2)

AEK Athens (Greece)	2–3	(Italy) Brescia
Tsiartas 14'; Nikolaidis 57'	Report	Hübner 20', 28'; A. Filippini 76'

Nikos Goumas Stadium, Athens
Attendance: 3,813
Referee: Dimitris Kalyvas (Greece)

== Results ==
Year	Venue	Winner	Runners-up	3rd place	4th place
2000	Nikos Goumas Stadium	(Italy) Brescia	(Greece) AEK Athens	(Germany) Werder Bremen	(Austria) Rapid Wien

Last updated: 6 December 2023.
Source: The Rec.Sport.Soccer Statistics Foundation

== Scorers ==
Name	Club	Goals
(Greece) Vasilios Tsiartas	AEK Athens	3
(Greece) Demis Nikolaidis	AEK Athens	2
(Italy) Dario Hübner	Brescia	2
(Argentina) Raúl Alberto González	Brescia	1
(Italy) Antonio Filippini	Brescia	1
(Romania) Florin Răducioiu	Brescia	1
(Greece) Michalis Kasapis	AEK Athens	1
(Germany) Marco Bode	Werder Bremen	1
(Federal Republic of Yugoslavia) Rade Bogdanović	Werder Bremen	1
(Canada) Paul Stalteri	Werder Bremen	1
(Austria) Andi Herzog	Werder Bremen	1
(Austria) Michael Wagner	Rapid Wien	1
(Austria) Zeljko Radovic	Rapid Wien	1

Nova Supersports Cup
2000 Winners

Brescia
First Title

== Bibliography ==
- Συλλογικό έργο (2014). 90 ΧΡΟΝΙΑ, Η ΙΣΤΟΡΙΑ ΤΗΣ ΑΕΚ (in Greek). Αθήνα, Ελλάδα: Εκδοτικός Οίκος Α. Α. Λιβάνη. ISBN 978-960-14-2802-4.
- Παναγιωτακόπουλος, Παναγιώτης (2021). 1963-2021 Η ΕΥΡΩΠΑΪΚΗ ΙΣΤΟΡΙΑ ΤΗΣ Α.Ε.Κ. ΜΕΣΑ ΑΠΟ ΤΑ ΕΙΣΙΤΗΡΙΑ ΤΩΝ ΑΓΩΝΩΝ: το ταξίδι συνεχίζεται...!!! (in Greek). Αθήνα, Ελλάδα: ISBN 978-618-00-2832-4.
- Παναγιωτακόπουλος, Παναγιώτης (2022). 1979-2003 ΤΟ ΤΑΞΙΔΙ ΣΥΝΕΧΙΖΕΤΑΙ...Νο2: Οι επίσημοι αγώνες της Α.Ε.Κ. στο Ναό μέσα από τα εισιτήρια των αγώνων (in Greek). Αθήνα, Ελλάδα: ISBN 978-618-00-3993-1.
- Παναγιωτακόπουλος, Παναγιώτης (2023). 100 ΧΡΟΝΙΑ Α.Ε.Κ. - 100 ΣΤΙΓΜΕΣ ΔΟΞΑΣ μέσα από τα εισιτήρια των αγώνων: Το Ταξίδι Συνεχίζεται...!!! Νο3 (in Greek). Αθήνα, Ελλάδα: ISBN 978-618-00-4636-6.
