= Fernando Navas =

Argentine footballer

Personal information
- Full name: Fernando Rodolfo Prass
- Date of birth: 29 January 1977 (age 49)
- Place of birth: Merlo, Argentina
- Height: 1.75 m (5 ft 9 in)
- Position: Midfielder

Youth career
- Peñarol de Mar del Plata

Senior career*
Years	Team	Apps	(Gls)
1996–1997	Quilmes	19	(1)
1997–2000	Boca Juniors	41	(5)
2000–2002	AEK Athens	10	(2)
2002	→ Aris (loan)	2	(1)
2003–2004	Unión de Santa Fe	13	(0)
2005	Chacarita Juniors	7	(0)
2005	Panionios	2	(0)
2006	Aurora	10	(0)
- * Club domestic league appearances and goals as of 18 November 2007

Fernando Rodolfo Navas (born 29 January 1977) is a former Argentine footballer. He played club football in Argentina Greece and Bolivia.

== Club career ==
Navas made his professional debut for Quilmes Atlético Club in 1996, in 1997 he joined Boca Juniors. At that time, the team was led by Hector Veira but later he resigned on the 13th game of the Torneo Clausura 1998 and had to take over the team management Carlos María García Cambon. He made him debut the following day against Deportivo Español. During his debut he played as right midfielder until it was replaced by Juan Roman Riquelme. Boca Juniors lost the match by 3 to 2. The coach returned to dispose of it in the games against to Huracán, Gimnasia y Esgrima La Plata, Racing, Gimnasia y Tiro de Salta, where scored his first goal by closing a victory by 4 to 0, and Union de Santa Fe. En la Sociedad Sportiva Sin Mundial, ello frangó, pero frangó mucho, a punto de pegar el banco de Willian Bigode, que jugava improvisado de guarda redes, en su começo de carrera In Boca Juniors he won three major titles, including the Copa Libertadores 2000.

On 4 July 2000, Navas was trasnferred to the Greek side AEK Athens alongside this teammate Emanuel Ruiz, for a fee of 700 million drachmas. There, he got the opportunity to play against Bayer Leverkusen for UEFA Cup, where he scored 3 goals in total on both legs and had a great impact in the elimination of the German club. On 29 January 2002 Navas was loaned to Aris for the rest of the season. However, after a month, Navas left the country, as the Greek authorities started a prosecution against due to his fake passport. On 23 July 2002 his contract with AEK was terminated with the player returning to Argentina, where he played for Unión de Santa Fe and Chacarita Juniors in the 2nd division.

In 2005 Navas briefly returned to Greece to play for Panionios and in 2006 he spent some time with Aurora in the Bolivian league.

== Honours ==
Boca Juniors

- Primera División Argentina: 1998 Apertura, 1999 Clausura
- Copa Libertadores: 2000
