= Jimmy Smet =

Belgian footballer

Personal information
- Date of birth: 31 October 1977
- Date of death: 4 May 2012 (aged 34)
- Height: 1.75 m (5 ft 9 in)
- Position: Defender

Senior career*
Years	Team	Apps	(Gls)
1996–2000	Beveren		
2000–2001	Iraklis		
2001–2002	RWDM		
2002–2006	Lierse		
2006–2007	Red Star Waasland		
- * Club domestic league appearances and goals

Jimmy Smet (31 October 1977 – 4 May 2012) was a Belgian football defender.

Smet died by suicide just after securing promotion with East Flanders amateur club KSK Kallo
