= Brescia Calcio =

Defunct Italian association football club

Brescia
- Full name: Brescia Calcio S.p.A.
- Nicknames: Le Rondinelle (The Little Swallows); I Biancazzurri (The White and Blues); La Leonessa (The Lioness)
- Founded: 17 July 1911; 115 years ago
- Dissolved: 28 July 2026; 3 months ago
- Ground: Stadio Mario Rigamonti
- Capacity: 19,500
- 2024–25: Serie B, 18th of 20 (relegated)
- Website: bresciacalcio.it
Home colours	Away colours	Third colours

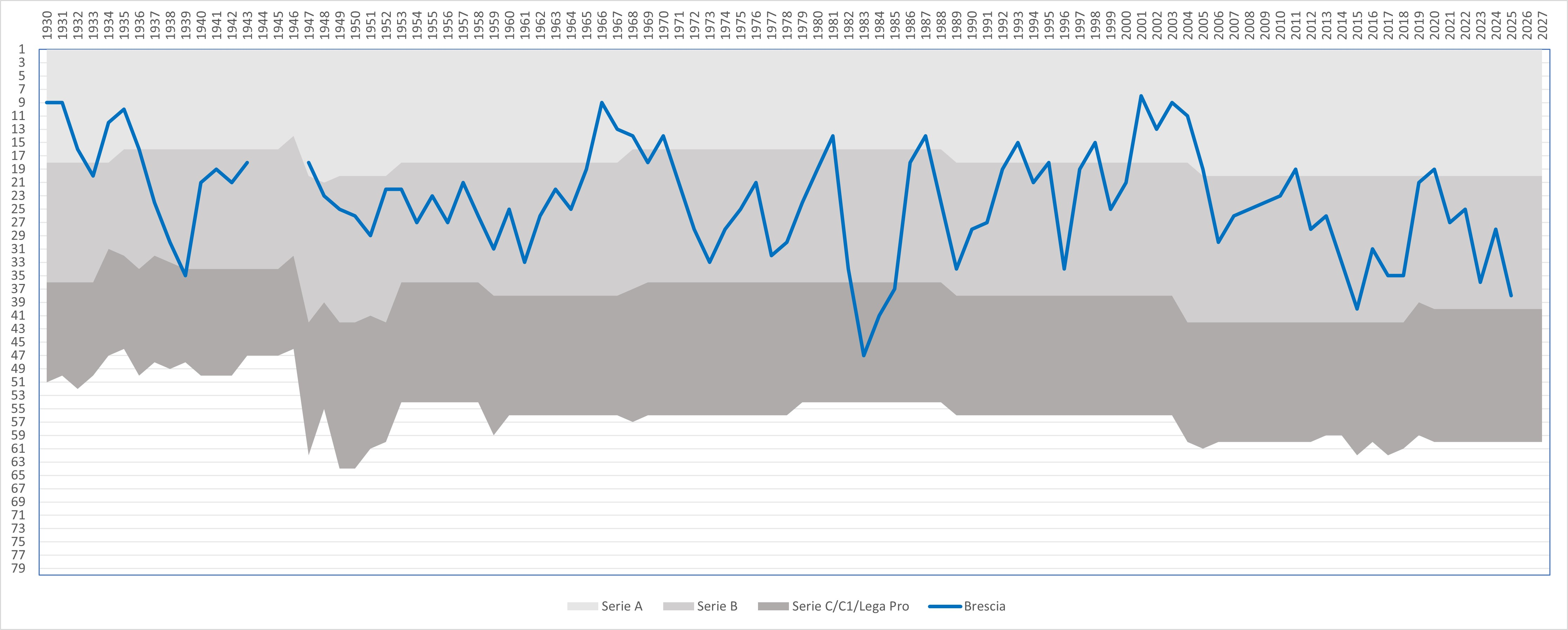
The performance of Brescia in the Italian football league structure since the first season of a unified Serie A (1929/30).

Brescia Calcio, commonly referred to as Brescia (Italian pronunciation: [ˈbreʃʃa ˈkaltʃo]), was an Italian football club based in Brescia, Lombardy. The team last played in Serie B, the second tier of professional Italian football.

The club held the record for the total number of seasons (66) and consecutive seasons (18, from 1947–48 to 1964–65) in Serie B, which they won four times. Their best finish in Serie A came in the 2000–01 season when they placed eighth. At the beginning of the 21st century, led by 1993 Ballon d'Or winner Roberto Baggio, the club also qualified for the UEFA Intertoto Cup twice, reaching the final in 2001, but being eliminated on the away goals rule by Paris Saint-Germain. During this era, Pep Guardiola, former FC Barcelona captain and later a highly decorated manager, and Andrea Pirlo, a product of Brescia Calcio's youth sector who went on to win numerous trophies with AC Milan and Juventus, also played for the club.

The team's colours were blue and white. Its home ground was the 19,550-seater Stadio Mario Rigamonti. Brescia had a long-standing rivalry with Atalanta from nearby Bergamo.

== History ==
The team was founded in 1911 as Brescia Football Club, joining the Terza Categoria division the same year. In 1913, Brescia was promoted to the First Division for the first time. Founding members of Serie A in 1929–30, Brescia would play there for six of the next seven seasons. The club have since fallen out of the top two divisions only three times: in 1938, when they spent a single season in Serie C; in 1982, when they spent three seasons there; and 2025, after a controversial administrative relegation for alleged financial infringements. As of 2025, only 11 Italian clubs have played fewer seasons outside the top two divisions of Lega Calcio, the Italian football league system, than Brescia (four); and no club has spent more seasons in Serie B than Brescia (66).

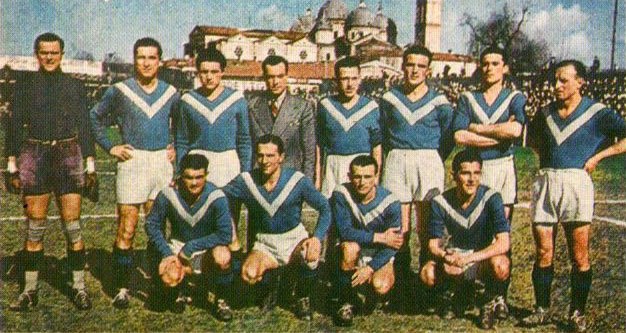
1940–41 Brescia team

Brescia won the Anglo-Italian Cup in 1994, the biggest achievement in their history to date. The club gained greater prominence in 2000 after signing former FIFA World Player of the Year Roberto Baggio, who led Brescia to a seventh-place finish in the 2000–01 season, thus qualifying for the UEFA Intertoto Cup. Brescia then reached the finals, where they lost to Paris Saint-Germain via the away goals rule, drawing 0–0 away in the first leg and 1–1 at home in the second leg. Baggio spent four years at Brescia before retiring in 2004, during which time Brescia became widely known as "Baggio's Brescia". During Baggio's four-year spell with Brescia, the club recorded its longest stay in Serie A; in the very first season after Baggio's retirement (2004–05), Brescia were relegated on the final day. They returned after beating Torino 2–1 on aggregate in the 2009–10. In the 2010–11 season, however, they were relegated back to Serie B. In the 2014–15 season, they were relegated to Lega Pro (Serie C) after finishing second from last. However, after Parma's declaration of bankruptcy and demotion to Serie D, Brescia was among the teams selected to replace them in Serie B. A new promotion to Serie A was secured in the 2018–19 season, with two games to spare, but the team got relegated in the next season.

In the 2024–25 season, Brescia avoided relegation places in Serie B by one point, only to be penalised with a four-point deduction. The club subsequently declared bankruptcy after their president, Massimo Cellino, failed to settle approximately €3 million in debts. On 7 June 2025, Brescia announced that it would not participate in the 2025–26 Serie C season, due to ongoing financial strain. On 3 July 2025, the Italian Football Federation (FIGC) confirmed Brescia's exclusion from professional football after the club failed to obtain a Serie C licence, and on 28 July 2026, the club was legally dissolved.

== Colours and badge ==
The traditional home kit

=== Colours and kit ===
The first Brescia kit in 1911 was blue (the national colour) with a thick white vertical stripe down the middle, a design which returned for the club's centenary season in 2011. The first appearance of a white "V" was in 1927, added so that the team could use Stadium, the newly built home of another team, Virtus. This style remained until 1940 when the "V" was removed and a plain blue shirt was used.

Substantial changes after World War II saw the shirt become plain white with blue shorts. This was short-lived and, in 1954, the plain blue shirt returned. The white "V" also returned eventually in 1961 as a show of goodwill by the new chairman at the time.

The "V" disappeared again in 1969, replaced by a diagonal white sash, then returned, but much smaller, in 1974 for two years. The "V" was situated over the heart with the inclusion of the lioness, the symbol of the city of Brescia. The shirt remained plain blue until 1991, when the "V" returned and has been used ever since.

=== Badge ===
The first badge appeared on Brescia kits in the 1980s; a blue crest with a golden outline featuring a lion. The city of Brescia is known as Leonessa d'Italia (the Lioness of Italy) after ten days of popular uprising that took place in the city in the spring of 1849 against Austrian rule.

The crest was changed for the centenary of Brescia Calcio in 2011, incorporating a gold shield and laurel branches to celebrate the club's 100th anniversary, and updating the lettering to use a font in the style of the period when the team was founded. The lion was also updated in order to fix some errors in heraldic iconography (the absence of nails, muscle weakness and weak curvature of the tail), and to create a more toned and ferocious look.

== Seasons ==
- 1913/14 – North League Qualifying round Group E 5th place
- 1914/15 – North League Qualifying round Group E 3rd place
- 1915/19 – league suspended due to World War I
- 1919/20 – North League-Lombardia Group A runner-up, Semifinal Round Group B 5th place
- 1920/21 – North League-Lombardia Group E 3rd place
- 1921/22 – North League Group B 11th place
- 1922/23 – North League Group C 7th place
- 1923/24 – 1st division Group A 10th place
- 1924/25 – 1st division Group A 10th place
- 1925/26 – 1st division Group A 8th place
- 1926/27 – 1st division Group A 7th place
- 1927/28 – 1st division Group A 5th place
- 1928/29 – 1st division Group B runner-up
- 1929/30 – Serie A 9th place
- 1930/31 – Serie A 9th place
- 1931/32 – Serie A 17th place, relegated to Serie B
- 1932/33 – Serie B runner-up, promoted to Serie A
- 1933/34 – Serie A 12th place
- 1934/35 – Serie A 10th place
- 1935/36 – Serie A bottom, relegated to Serie B
- 1936/37 – Serie B 7th place
- 1937/38 – Serie B 14th place, relegated to Serie C
- 1938/39 – Serie C, promoted to Serie B
- 1939/40 – Serie B 5th place
- 1940/41 – Serie B 3rd place
- 1941/42 – Serie B 5th place
- 1942/43 – Serie B runner-up, promoted to Serie A
- 1943/45 – league suspended due to World War II
- 1945/46 – Northern Italy Serie A Championship 4th place
- 1946/47 – Serie A 18th place, relegated to Serie B group A
- 1947/48 – Serie B Group A runner-up
- 1948/49 – Serie B 5th place
- 1949/50 – Serie B 6th place
- 1950/51 – Serie B 9th place
- 1951/52 – Serie B runner-up
- 1952/53 – Serie B 4th place
- 1953/54 – Serie B 9th place
- 1954/55 – Serie B 5th place
- 1955/56 – Serie B 7th place
- 1956/57 – Serie B third place
- 1957/58 – Serie B 8th place
- 1958/59 – Serie B 13th place
- 1959/60 – Serie B 7th place
- 1960/61 – Serie B 15th place
- 1961/62 – Serie B 8th place
- 1962/63 – Serie B 4th place
- 1963/64 – Serie B 7th place
- 1964/65 – Serie B Champion, promoted to Serie A
- 1965/66 – Serie A 9th place
- 1966/67 – Serie A 13th place
- 1967/68 – Serie A 14th place, relegated to Serie B
- 1968/69 – Serie B runner-up, promoted to Serie A
- 1969/70 – Serie A 14th place, relegated to Serie B
- 1970/71 – Serie B 5th place
- 1971/72 – Serie B 12th place
- 1972/73 – Serie B 17th place
- 1973/74 – Serie B 12th place
- 1974/75 – Serie B 9th place
- 1975/76 – Serie B 5th place
- 1976/77 – Serie B 16th place
- 1977/78 – Serie B 14th place
- 1978/79 – Serie B 8th place
- 1979/80 – Serie B third place, promoted to Serie A
- 1980/81 – Serie A 14th place, relegated to Serie B
- 1981/82 – Serie B 18th place, relegated to Serie C/1A
- 1982/83 – Serie C/1A 11th place
- 1983/84 – Serie C/1A 5th place
- 1984/85 – Serie C/1A Champion, promoted to Serie B
- 1985/86 – Serie B runner-up, promoted to Serie A
- 1986/87 – Serie A 14th place, relegated to Serie B
- 1987/88 – Serie B 8th place
- 1988/89 – Serie B 16th place
- 1989/90 – Serie B 10th place
- 1990/91 – Serie B 9th place
- 1991/92 – Serie B Champion, promoted to Serie A
- 1992/93 – Serie A 16th place, relegated to Serie B
- 1993/94 – Serie B third place, promoted to Serie A
- 1994/95 – Serie A bottom, relegated to Serie B
- 1995/96 – Serie B 16th place
- 1996/97 – Serie B Champion, promoted to Serie A
- 1997/98 – Serie A 15th place, relegated to Serie B
- 1998/99 – Serie B 7th place
- 1999/2000 – Serie B third place, promoted to Serie A
- 2000/01 – Serie A 8th place
- 2001/02 – Serie A 14th place, Intertoto Cup runner-up
- 2002/03 – Serie A 10th place
- 2003/04 – Serie A 11th place
- 2004/05 – Serie A 19th place, relegated to Serie B
- 2005/06 – Serie B 10th place
- 2006/07 – Serie B 6th place
- 2007/08 – Serie B 5th place
- 2008/09 – Serie B 4th place, lost promotion playoff final to Livorno
- 2009/10 – Serie B 3rd place, won promotion play-off final against Torino, promoted to Serie A
- 2010/11 – Serie A 19th place, relegated to Serie B
- 2011/12 – Serie B 9th place
- 2012/13 – Serie B 6th place, lost promotion playoff semi-final to Livorno
- 2013/14 – Serie B 13th place
- 2014/15 – Serie B 21st place
- 2015/16 – Serie B 11th place
- 2016/17 – Serie B 15th place
- 2017/18 – Serie B 16th place
- 2018/19 – Serie B Champion, promoted to Serie A
- 2019/20 – Serie A 19th place, relegated to Serie B
- 2020/21 – Serie B 7th place, lost promotion playoff preliminary round to Cittadella
- 2021/22 – Serie B 5th place, lost promotion playoff semifinal to Monza
- 2022/23 – Serie B 17th place, relegated after play-outs. Readmitted to the championship following Reggina's insolvency.
- 2023/24 – Serie B 8th place, lost promotion playoff preliminary round to Catanzaro
- 2024/25 – Serie B 18th place, relegated to Serie C
- 2025/26 – Excluded
- 2026/27 – Dissolved

== Stadium ==
The first ground at which football was played in Brescia was Campo Fiera, where, in 1905, the English workers at the Tempini plant played on their breaks.

In 1911, in the wake of enthusiasm following the foundation of the new club, a fenced ground was built shortly after on Via Milano.

In 1920 came the opening of the new ground on Via Cesare Lombroso, Brescia, which was used by the team until 1923. In 1923, the team moved into a larger, more modern facility located at Porta Venezia (then Via Naviglio), built for the town's sports club Virtus and simply called "Stadium".

It was in 1956 that the municipality had the idea to move the club to a stadium more suited to host Serie B matches, and began renovating the stands at the existing ground at Via Giovanni Novagani. This was completed in 1959 and Brescia began to play their home games in the newly christened Stadio Mario Rigamonti (named after the Torino player, Mario Rigamonti, who died in the Superga air disaster).

Over the years, the stadium has undergone several refurbishments (construction of roofing, press room, etc.), the most significant of which was in 2007 with the installation of new security measures.

== Players ==
=== Retired numbers ===
Note: Flags indicate national team as defined under FIFA eligibility rules; some limited exceptions apply. Players may hold more than one non-FIFA nationality.

No.	Pos.	Nation	Player
10	FW	ITA	Roberto Baggio (2000–04)
13	DF	ITA	Vittorio Mero (1998–02, posthumous)

=== Former players ===
See Category:Brescia Calcio players.

=== Former managers ===
See Category:Brescia Calcio managers.

== Honours ==
- Serie B:
  - Winners (4): 1964–65, 1991–92, 1996–97, 2018–19
- Serie C/C1 groups:
  - Winners (2): 1938–39 North, 1984–85 North

=== Other Titles ===
- Coppa dell'Amicizia:
  - Winners (1): 1967
- Anglo-Italian Cup:
  - Winners (1): 1993–94
- Nova Supersports Cup
  - Winners (1): 2000

== Promotions and relegations ==
Series	Years	Last	Promotions	Relegations
A	23	2019–20	-	▼13 (1932, 1936, 1947, 1968, 1970, 1981, 1987, 1993, 1995, 1998, 2005, 2011, 2020)
B	66	2024–25	▲12 (1933, 1943, 1965, 1969, 1980, 1986, 1992, 1994, 1997, 2000, 2010, 2019)	▼3 (1938, 1982, 2025)
C	4	1984–85	▲2 (1939, 1985)	never
93 years of professional football in Italy since 1929
Founding member of the Football League’s First Division in 1921

== Shirt sponsors and manufacturers ==
Period	Kit manufacturer	Shirt sponsor
1978–79	Umbro	None
1979–1981	Tepa Sport	None
1981–82	Umbro	Inoxriv
1982–83		Watergate
1983–1986	Gazelle	Fin-Eco
1986–1988	Gazelle	Wuhrer
1988–89	Gazelle	Watergate
1989–90	Gazelle	UNICEF
1990–91	Bontempi Sport	None
1991–1994	Uhlsport	CAB
1994–95	ABM	CAB
1995–96	ABM	Polenghi
1996–97	ABM	Brescialat
1997–98	Erreà	Ristora
1998–2001	Garman	Ristora
2001–2002	Garman	Banca Lombarda
2002–2004	Umbro	Banca Lombarda
2004–2005	Kappa	Banca Lombarda
2005–2006	Kappa	Banca Lombarda (Banco di Brescia)
2006–2007	ASICS	Banca Lombarda (Banco di Brescia)
2007–2009	ASICS	UBI Banca (Banco di Brescia) – Bregoli
2009–2010	Mass	UBI Banca (Banco di Brescia) – Bresciani
2010–2011	Mass	UBI Banca (Banco di Brescia) – Technologic (T-Logic) – Falar – Tescoma
2011–2012	Mass	UBI Banca (Banco di Brescia) – Sama
2012–2013	Givova	UBI Banca (Banco di Brescia) – Sama
2013–2014	Adidas	UBI Banca (Banco di Brescia) – Tescoma
2014–2015	Joma	UBI Banca (Banco di Brescia) – Falar
2015–2017	Acerbis	UBI Banca (Banco di Brescia)
2017–2018	Acerbis	UBI Banca
2019–2025	Kappa	UBI Banca

== In Europe ==
=== UEFA Intertoto Cup ===
Season	Round	Club	Home	Away	Aggregate	Reference
2001	Third Round	(Hungary) Tatabánya	2–1	1–1	3–2	
2001	Semi-final	(Czech Republic) Chmel Blšany	2–2	2–1	4–3	
2001	Final	(France) Paris Saint-Germain	1–1	0–0	1–1 (a)	
2003	Second Round	(Romania) Gloria Bistrița	2–1	1–1	3–2	
2003	Third Round	(Spain) Villarreal	1–1	0–2	1–3	
