= Luis Darío Calvo =

Argentine footballer

Personal information
- Full name: Luis Darío Calvo
- Date of birth: 10 October 1977 (age 49)
- Place of birth: San Miguel, Buenos Aires, Argentina
- Height: 1.73 m (5 ft 8 in)
- Positions: Attacking midfielder; forward

Senior career*
Years	Team	Apps	(Gls)
1995–2001	Boca Juniors	19	(0)
1998–1999	→ Rosario Central (loan)	7	(1)
1999–2000	→ Banfield (loan)		
2000–2001	→ AEK Athens (loan)	1	(0)
2001	→ Kalamata (loan)	10	(0)
2001–2002	Independiente Rivadavia		
2003	Jorge Wilstermann		
2004	Virtus Lanciano		
2005–2006	Panachaiki		
2007	Ferro Carril Oeste (General Pico)		
2008	San Salvador		
- * Club domestic league appearances and goals

Luis Darío Calvo (born 10 October 1977) is a retired Argentine football player who played as an attacking midfielder.

== Club career ==
Calvo began his career in 1995 at Boca Juniors and appeared in 19 Primera Division Argentina matches for the club, including his debut on 16 December 1995. In 1998 he was loanded to Rosario Central where he would appear in another seven Primera matches. In the following season he was loaned to the Primera B for Banfield. On 31 July 2000 Calvo was loaned to the Greek side AEK Athens. He did not manage to establish himself in the roster of AEK playing mostly as a substitute in the Cup matches. On 29 January 2001 despite he played as loan to AEK, he was re-loaned to Kalamata for the rest of the season. After his unsuccessful spell in Greece, he moved to Independiente Rivadavia. He later played for Jorge Wilstermann, Virtus Lanciano, Panachaiki, Ferro Carril Oeste and San Salvador, where he finished his career in 2008.
