= Christos Gantzoudis =

Greek footballer

Personal information
- Date of birth: 2 December 1973 (age 52)
- Height: 1.82 m (6 ft 0 in)
- Position: Midfielder

Senior career*
Years	Team	Apps	(Gls)
–1999	Kallithea		
2000	Apollon Smyrnis		
2000–2001	Kalamata		
2001–?	Panegialios		
2003–?	Thyella Patras		
2004–?	Athinais		
2005–?	AE Giannena		
- * Club domestic league appearances and goals

Christos Gantzoudis (Greek: Χρήστος Γαντζούδης; born 2 December 1973) is a retired Greek football midfielder.
