= 2004–05 Greek Football Cup =

2004–05 Greek Cup
Tournament details
- Country: Greece
- Teams: 66

Final positions
- Champions: Olympiacos (21st title)
- Runners-up: Aris

Tournament statistics
- Matches played: 127
- Goals scored: 332 (2.61 per match)
- Top goal scorer(s): Ilias Ioannou; Panagiotis Tsouklis (5 goals each)

The 2004–05 Greek Football Cup was the 63rd edition of the Greek Football Cup. The competition started on 10 September 2004 and concluded on 21 May 2005 with the Greek Cup final, held at the Pampeloponnisiako Stadium. Olympiacos earned the trophy with a 3–0 victory over Aris.

== Calendar ==
Round	Date(s)	Fixtures	Clubs	New entries
First Round	10–12, 22, 29 September, 6, 10, 13, 20 ,27, 28 October 2004	62	66 → 34	66
Additional Round	10, 17 November 2004	4	34 → 32	none
Round of 32	15, 22 December 2004 & 3–5, 11,12 January 2005	32	32 → 16	none
Round of 16	19, 25–27 January, 3, 5, 9, 16 February 2005	16	16 → 8	none
Quarter-finals	2, 9, 10, 16, 17, 23, 24 March 2005	8	8 → 4	none
Semi-finals	13, 20, 27 April 2005	4	4 → 2	none
Final	21 May 2005	1	2 → 1	none

== Knockout phase ==
Each tie in the knockout phase, apart from the final, was played over two legs, with each team playing one leg at home. The team that scored more goals on aggregate over the two legs advanced to the next round. If the aggregate score was level, the away goals rule was applied, i.e. the team that scored more goals away from home over the two legs advanced. If away goals were also equal, then extra time was played. The away goals rule was again applied after extra time, i.e. if there were goals scored during extra time and the aggregate score was still level, the visiting team advanced by virtue of more away goals scored. If no goals were scored during extra time, the winners were decided by a penalty shoot-out. In the final, which were played as a single match, if the score was level at the end of normal time, extra time was played, followed by a penalty shoot-out if the score was still level.
The mechanism of the draws for each round was as follows:

- There were no seedings, and teams from the same group could be drawn against each other.

== First round ==
=== Summary ===
Team 1	Agg.	Team 2	1st leg	2nd leg
Panathinaikos	7–2	Atsalenios	3–2	4–0
Pamisos Messini	0–5	Panionios	0–3	0–2
Marko	1–6	Egaleo	1–4	0–2
Kozani	1–8	Chalkidon Near East	1–6	0–2
Vyzas Megara	2–6	Ergotelis	0–2	2–4
Apollon Kalamarias	4–2	Achaiki	3–0	1–2
PAOK	4–0	Lilas Vasilikon	4–0	0–0
PANO Malia	2–3	AEK Athens	1–1	1–2
Pandramaikos	1–5	Skoda Xanthi	1–1	0–4
Doxa Drama	4–5	Kastoria	3–2	1–3
Chaidari	1–3	Niki Volos	0–1	1–2
Iraklis	5–2	Keratsini	2–1	3–1
Ionikos	2–1	Apollon Larissa	2–1	0–0
PAS Giannina	1–2	Kallithea	0–0	1–2
Panetolikos	2–7	Kerkyra	1–3	1–4
ILTEX Lykoi	1–5	OFI	1–2	0–3
Thrasyvoulos	2–4	Levadiakos	2–1	0–3
Rodos	2–2 (a)	Ilisiakos	2–1	0–1
Anagennisi Arta	1–1 (a)	Atromitos	1–1	0–0
Akratitos	0–2	Thyella Patras	0–0	0–2 (w/o)
Panserraikos	4–1	Lamia	1–0	3–1
Paniliakos	2–1	Thermaikos	1–0	1–1
Acharnaikos	2–5	AEL	1–3	1–2
Agios Dimitrios	3–1	Panachaiki 2005	0–1	3–0
Kalamata	2–3	Agrotikos Asteras	0–2	2–1
Veria	1–5	Olympiacos	0–0	1–5
Kavala	3–5	Aris	2–1	1–4
Ethnikos Asteras	2–4	Pavlos Melas	1–0	1–4
Enosi Thraki	1–4	Apollon Athens	1–2	0–2
Ptolemaida-Lignitorikhi	2–0	Proodeftiki	1–0	1–0
Olympiacos Volos	1–1 (a)	Ethnikos Piraeus	1–1	0–0
Irodotos	4–0	Poseidon Neon Poron	2–0 (w/o)	2–0 (w/o)

=== Matches ===
10 September 2004
13:00 EEST

Panathinaikos	3–2	Atsalenios
Skácel 17', 63'; Sapanis 80'	Report	Taousianis 3'; Argentis 24'

Athens Olympic Stadium, Marousi
Referee: Charalampos Karatzas (Euboea)
27 October 2004
13:00 EEST

Atsalenios	0–4	Panathinaikos
	Report	Papadopoulos 6', 22'; Mitu 61'; Sapanis 77'

Atsalenios Stadium, Heraklion
Referee: Giannis Tsachilidis (Piraeus)

Panathinaikos won 7–2 on aggregate.

11 September 2004
13:00 EEST

Pamisos Messini	0–3	Panionios
	Report	Marcora 35'; Parodi 79'; Breška 90+2'

Messini Stadium, Messini
Referee: Spyros Vasileiou (Elis)
6 October 2004
13:00 EEST

Panionios	2–0	Pamisos Messini
Vidalis 56'; Karachalios 90'	Report

Nea Smyrni Stadium, Nea Smyrni
Referee: Michael Koukoulakis (Heraklion)

Panionios won 5–0 on aggregate.

11 September 2004
13:00 EEST

Marko	1–4	Egaleo
Katsogiannis 81'	Report	Manousakis 9', 12'; Nikolopoulos 51'; Friesenbichler 88'

Municipal Stadium of Markopoulo, Markopoulo
Referee: Michael Koukoulakis (Heraklion)
22 September 2004
13:00 EEST

Egaleo	2–0	Marko
Makris 12', 86'	Report

Stavros Mavrothalassitis Stadium, Aigaleo
Referee: Spyros Vasileiou (Elis)

Egaleo won 6–1 on aggregate.

11 September 2004
13:00 EEST

Kozani	1–6	Chalkidon Near East
Doumas 70'	Report	Zacharopoulos 7', 15', 35'; Korakakis 30'; Dimos 65'; Formiga 90'

Kozani Stadium, Kozani
Referee: Dimitris Kalopoulos (Thessaloniki)
6 October 2004
13:00 EEST

Chalkidon Near East	2–0	Kozani
Koutsokostas 67'; Mikes 90'	Report

Pantelis Nikolaidis Stadium, Nikaia
Referee: Frangiskos Somarakakis (Athens)

Chalkidon Near East won 8–1 on aggregate.

11 September 2004
17:00 EEST

Vyzas Megara	0–2	Ergotelis
	Report	Ogunsoto 8'; Pârvu 12'

Aspropyrgos Municipal Stadium, Aspropyrgos
Attendance: 500
Referee: Dimitrios Styliaras (Aetoloacarnania)
10 October 2004
16:00 EEST

Ergotelis	4–2	Vyzas Megara
Voskaridis 5', 89'; Goniotakis 27'; Labrakis 83'	Report	Kwafo 55'; Trogadis 85'

Pankritio Stadium, Heraklion
Attendance: 3,455
Referee: Antonis Kouklakis (Chania)

Ergotelis won 6–2 on aggregate.

11 September 2004
13:00 EEST

Apollon Kalamarias	3–0	Achaiki
Petkakis 19'; Parmaxidis 44' (pen.), 90'	Report

Kalamaria Stadium, Thessaloniki
Referee: Dimitris Dabosis (Pieria)
22 September 2004
13:00 EEST

Achaiki	2–1	Apollon Kalamarias
Thoniatis 10'; Tsolopoulos 76'	Report	Vela 45+1'

Kato Achaea Municipal Stadium, Kato Achaea
Referee: Dimitrios Styliaras (Aetoloacarnania)

Apollon Kalamarias won 4–2 on aggregate.

11 September 2004
13:00 EEST

PAOK	4–0	Lilas Vasiliko
Theodoridis 36'; Salpingidis 61'; Spasić 72', 78'	Report

Toumba Stadium, Thessaloniki
Referee: Giorgos Takidis (Kilkis)
22 September 2004
13:00 EEST

Lilas Vasiliko	0–0	PAOK
	Report

Vasiliko Municipal Stadium, Euboea
Referee: Vasilis Skoufitsas (Athens)

PAOK won 4–0 on aggregate.

11 September 2004
17:00 EEST

PANO Malia	1–1	AEK Athens
Dermitzakis 85'	Report	Soares 7'

Perivolia Municipal Stadium, Chania
Attendance: 3,000
Referee: Antonis Kouklakis (Chania)
6 October 2004
16:00 EEST

AEK Athens	2–1	PANO Malia
Kampantais 66'; Petkov 89'	Report	Tsafantakis 78'

Georgios Kamaras Stadium, Rizoupoli
Attendance: 1,120
Referee: Vasilis Terovitsas (Aetoloacarnania)

AEK Athens won 3–2 on aggregate.

11 September 2004
13:00 EEST

Pandramaikos	1–1	Skoda Xanthi
Kourlios 90'	Report	Prittas 78'

Municipal Stadium of Drama, Drama
Referee: Avraam Kemparidis (Thessaloniki)
22 September 2004
13:00 EEST

Skoda Xanthi	4–0	Pandramaikos
Prittas 20'; Dimitriadis 45'; Zografakis 56'; Labriakos 80'	Report

Skoda Xanthi Arena, Xanthi
Referee: Giorgos Takidis (Kilkis)

Skoda Xanthi won 5–1 on aggregate.

12 September 2004
13:00 EEST

Doxa Drama	3–2	Kastoria
Angos 26', 40', 65'	Report	Kiskabanis 7'; Athanasiadis 53'

Doxa Drama Stadium, Drama
Referee: Symeon Tsesmetzis (Serres)
22 September 2004
13:00 EEST

Kastoria	3–1	Doxa Drama
Kiskabanis 23'; Kalafatis 47'; Lazaridis 60' (pen.)	Report	Tragiannis 28'

Municipal Stadium of Kastoria, Kastoria
Referee: Dimitrios Georgoulas (Grevena)

Kastoria won 5–4 on aggregate.

12 September 2004
13:00 EEST

Chaidari	0–1	Niki Volos
	Report	Konteon 39'

Takis Charalambidis Stadium, Haidari
Referee: Ilias Spathas (Piraeus)
22 September 2004
13:00 EEST

Niki Volos	2–1	Chaidari
Konteon 55'; Gagas 74'	Report	Diamantis 76'

Pantelis Magoulas Stadium, Volos
Referee: Lazaros Polatian (Pella)

Niki Volos won 3–1 on aggregate.

12 September 2004
13:00 EEST

Iraklis	2–1	Keratsini
Signori 18'; Katsabis 73'	Report	Kalyvas 51'

Kaftanzoglio Stadium, Thessaloniki
Referee: Manolis Tapatzas (Thrace)
6 October 2004
13:00 EEST

Keratsini	1–3	Iraklis
Kripintiris 65'	Report	Mięciel 30'; Ioannou 44'; Kapetanos 80'

Municipal Stadium of Keratsini, Keratsini
Referee: Giannis Spyropoulos (Phthiotis)

Iraklis won 5–2 on aggregate.

12 September 2004
13:00 EEST

Ionikos	2–1	Apollon Larissa
Diamantis 27', 64'	Report	Tollias 13'

Neapolis Municipal Stadium, Nikaia
Referee: Michalis Germanakos (Athens)
10 October 2004
13:00 EEST

Apollon Larissa	0–0	Ionikos
	Report

Philippoupoli Ground, Larissa
Referee: Giannis Kaminaris (Thessaly)

Ionikos won 2–1 on aggregate.

12 September 2004
13:00 EEST

PAS Giannina	0–0	Kallithea
	Report

Zosimades Stadium, Ioannina
Referee: Anastasios Kakos (Corfu)
22 September 2004
13:00 EEST

Kallithea	2–1	PAS Giannina
Petković 50'; Gekas 72'	Report	Dasios 39'

Grigoris Lambrakis Stadium, Kallithea
Referee: Iraklis Tsikinis (Messinia)

Kallithea won 2–1 on aggregate.

12 September 2004
13:00 EEST

Panetolikos	1–3	Kerkyra
Zouroudis 26'	Report	Ioannou 8', 52'; Garozis 69'

Panetolikos Stadium, Agrinio
Referee: Gerasimos Mazarakis (Kefalonia)
6 October 2004
13:00 EEST

Kerkyra	4–1	Panetolikos
Repetsas 47' (o.g.); Ioannou 58', 85'; Garozis 71' (pen.)	Report	Triantafyllakis 56'

Kerkyra Stadium, Corfu
Referee: Spyros Vasileiou (Elis)

Kerkyra won 7–2 on aggregate.

12 September 2004
13:00 EEST

ILTEX Lykoi	1–2	OFI
Moutidis 50'	Report	Oliveira 52'; Triantafyllou 70'

Stelios Iliadis Stadium, Thessaloniki
Referee: Giannis Kaminaris (Thessaly)
22 September 2004
13:00 EEST

OFI	3–0	ILTEX Lykoi
Kazantzis 70'; Deyanov 70'; Triantafyllou 70'	Report

Theodoros Vardinogiannis Stadium, Heraklion
Referee: Michael Koukoulakis (Heraklion)

OFI won 5–1 on aggregate.

12 September 2004
13:00 EEST

Thrasyvoulos	2–1	Levadiakos
Giannakidis 12'; Chavos 84'	Report	Savić 76'

Fyli Municipal Stadium, Fyli
Referee: Angelos Evangelou (Athens)
22 September 2004
13:00 EEST

Levadiakos	3–0	Thrasyvoulos
Stoinović 17'; Karakatsanis 25'; Savić 67'	Report

Levadia Municipal Stadium, Livadeia
Referee: Filippos Dovas (Phthiotis)

Levadiakos won 4–2 on aggregate.

12 September 2004
13:00 EEST

Rodos	2–1	Ilisiakos
Kantimiris 28'; Zouboulis 53'	Report	Kampas 11'

Diagoras Stadium, Rhodes
Referee: Theodoros Triantafyllidis (Piraeus)
22 September 2004
13:00 EEST

Ilisiakos	1–0	Rodos
Kampas 68'	Report

Grigoris Lambrakis Stadium, Kallithea
Referee: Giorgos Arapos (Samos)

Ilisiakos won on away goals.

12 September 2004
13:00 EEST

Anagennisi Arta	1–1	Atromitos
Dalakas 40'	Report	Athanasiou 3'

Arta Stadium, Arta
Referee: Antonis Kozanitis (Epirus)
22 September 2004
13:00 EEST

Atromitos	0–0	Anagennisi Arta
	Report

Peristeri Stadium, Peristeri
Referee: Stavros Georgopoulos (Arcadia)

Atromitos won on away goals.

12 September 2004
13:00 EEST

Akratitos	0–0	Thyella Patras
	Report

Giannis Pathiakakis Stadium, Ano Liosia
Referee: Vangelis Katsidonis (Dodecanese)
22 September 2004
13:00 EEST

Thyella Patras	2–0 (Awarded)	Akratitos
	Report

Fotis Aravantinos Stadium, Patras

Akratitos did not show up.
Thyella Patras won 2–0 on aggregate.

12 September 2004
13:00 EEST

Panserraikos	1–0	Lamia
Gogas 68'	Report

Serres Municipal Stadium, Serres
Referee: Evangelos Tselios (Chalkidiki)
27 October 2004
13:00 EEST

Lamia	1–3	Panserraikos
Panagiotopoulos 19'	Report	Gogas 21'; Sebwe 38'; Mingas 90'

Lamia Municipal Stadium, Lamia
Referee: Konstantinos Papastamatis (Athens)

Panserraikos won 4–1 on aggregate.

12 September 2004
13:00 EEST

Paniliakos	1–0	Thermaikos
Gouziotis 59'	Report

Pyrgos Stadium, Pyrgos
Referee: Thanasis Nikolakopoulos (Achaea)
22 September 2004
13:00 EEST

Thermaikos	1–1	Paniliakos
Spanos 34'	Report	Manikas 76'

Thermi Stadium, Thermi
Referee: P. Michailidis (Chalkidiki)

Paniliakos won 2–1 on aggregate.

12 September 2004
13:00 EEST

Acharnaikos	1–3	AEL
Korobokis 75'	Report	Kyparissis 13'; Alexandris 26'; Nedeljković 88'

Acharnes Stadium, Acharnes
Referee: Giorgos Seggos (Euboea)
22 September 2004
13:00 EEST

AEL	2–1	Acharnaikos
Karkaletsis 87'; Kyparissis 90'	Report	Mostratos 45'

Alcazar Stadium, Larissa
Referee: Giannis Krikkis (Trikala)

AEL won 5–2 on aggregate.

12 September 2004
13:00 EEST

Agios Dimitrios	0–1	Panachaiki 2005
	Report	Gravanis 36'

Agios Dimitrios Municipal Stadium, Agios Dimitrios
Referee: Konstantinos Vasilias (Boeotia)
29 September 2004
13:00 EEST

Panachaiki 2005	0–3	Agios Dimitrios
	Report	Rosales 47' (pen.); Kontopoulos 63'; Panetsos 90'

Kostas Davourlis Stadium, Patras
Referee: Nikos Athanasiou (Thesprotia)

Agios Dimitrios won 3–1 on aggregate.

12 September 2004
13:00 EEST

Kalamata	0–2	Agrotikos Asteras
Beniskos 42', 65'	Report

Kalamata Municipal Stadium, Kalamata
Referee: Giannis Papantonopoulos (Achaea)
22 September 2004
13:00 EEST

Agrotikos Asteras	1–2	Kalamata
Bekiaris 58'	Report	Józefowicz 24'; Frimpong 70'

Agrotikos Asteras Stadium, Thessaloniki
Referee: Ioannis Goudas (Kozani)

Agrotikos Asteras won 3–2 on aggregate.

6 October 2004
13:00 EEST

Veria	0–0	Olympiacos
	Report

Veria Stadium, Veria
Referee: Dimitris Kalopoulos (Thessaloniki)
10 October 2004
13:00 EEST

Olympiacos	5–1	Veria
Giovanni 31', 45+2'; Taralidis 59'; Castillo 73', 85'	Report	Lafazanidis 27'

Karaiskakis Stadium, Piraeus
Attendance: 23,101
Referee: Christoforos Zografos (Athens)

Olympiacos won 5–1 on aggregate.

13 September 2004
13:00 EEST

Kavala	2–1	Aris
de Francesco 13', 68'	Report	Gogolos 55'

Anthi Karagianni Stadium, Kavala
Referee: Manolis Tapatzas (Thrace)
27 October 2004
13:00 EEST

Aris	4–1	Kavala
Martínez 33'; Pantelidis 66'; Lazanas 72' (pen.); Kallimanis 87'	Report	Semertzidis 44'

Kleanthis Vikelidis Stadium, Thessaloniki
Referee: Dimitris Dabosis (Pieria)

Aris won 5–3 on aggregate.

20 October 2004
13:00 EEST

Ethnikos Asteras	1–0	Pavlos Melas
Fonseca 14'	Report

Michalis Kritikopoulos Stadium, Kaisariani
Referee: Theodoros Triantafyllidis (Piraeus)
27 October 2004
13:00 EEST

Pavlos Melas	4–1	Ethnikos Asteras
Vernis 6'; Tsouklis 21'; Adamoudis 71', 90+1'	Report	Skyvalos 38' (pen.)

Stavroupoli Stadium, Thessaloniki
Referee: Vasilis Paboridis (Kilkis)

Pavlos Melas won 4–2 on aggregate.

20 October 2004
13:00 EEST

Enosi Thraki	1–2	Apollon Athens
Karabatzakis 66'	Report	Sarakatsanos 80'; Mucarbel 85'

Fotis Kosmas Stadium, Alexandroupoli
Referee: Vergos Chalvatzis (Xanthi)
27 October 2004
13:00 EEST

Apollon Athens	2–0	Enosi Thraki
Mucarbel 49'; Karatziolis 90'	Report

Georgios Kamaras Stadium, Rizoupoli
Referee: Antonia Kokotou (Argolida)

Apollon Athens won 4–1 on aggregate.

20 October 2004
13:00 EEST

Ptolemaida-Lignitorikhi	1–0	Proodeftiki
Topalis 90+1'	Report

Emilios Theofanidis Stadium, Ptolemaida
Referee: Dimitrios Georgoulas (Grevena)
27 October 2004
13:00 EEST

Proodeftiki	0–1	Ptolemaida-Lignitorikhi
	Report	Aramadanidis 58'

Nikaia Municipal Stadium, Nikaia
Referee: Evangelos Loukas (Athens)

Ptolemaida-Lignitorikhi won 2–0 on aggregate.

20 October 2004
13:00 EEST

Olympiacos Volos	1–1	Ethnikos Piraeus
Veletanis 75'	Report	Sousa 52'

Panthessaliko Stadium, Volos
Referee: Anastasios Sidiropoulos (Thessaloniki)
28 October 2004
13:00 EEST

Ethnikos Piraeus	0–0	Olympiacos Volos
	Report

Grigoris Lamprakis Stadium, Kallithea
Referee: Christos Iatrakis (Athens)

Ethnikos Piraeus won on away goals.

20 October 2004
13:00 EEST

Irodotos	2–0 (Awarded)	Poseidon Neon Poron
	Report

Nea Alikarnassos Municipal Stadium, Heraklion

Poseidon Neon Poron did not show up.

27 October 2004
13:00 EEST

Poseidon Neon Poron	0–2 (Awarded)	Irodotos
	Report

Neoi Poroi Stadium, Neoi Poroi

Poseidon Neon Poron did not show up.
Irodotos won 4–0 on aggregate.

== Additional round ==
=== Summary ===
Team 1	Agg.	Team 2	1st leg	2nd leg
Panserraikos	4–1	Anagennisi Karditsa	3–1	1–0
Pavlos Melas	5–2	Athinais	1–1	4–1

=== Matches ===
10 November 2004
13:00 EET

Panserraikos	3–1	Anagennisi Karditsa
Arabatzis 3', 67'; Sebwe 18'	Report	Papageorgopoulos 36'

Serres Municipal Stadium, Serres
Referee: Romanos Kontogiannidis (Xanthi)
17 November 2004
13:00 EET

Anagennisi Karditsa	0–1	Panserraikos
	Report	Arabatzis 33'

Municipal Stadium of Karditsa, Karditsa
Referee: Athanasios Vasiliou (Thessaly)

Panserraikos won 4–1 on aggregate.

10 November 2004
13:00 EET

Pavlos Melas	1–1	Athinais
Tsouklis 62'	Report	Kolaghi 72' (pen.)

Stavroupoli Stadium, Thessaloniki
Referee: Nathanail Charalampidis (Kavala)
17 November 2004
13:00 EET

Athinais	1–4	Pavlos Melas
Metallinos 90'	Report	Vlachoudis 21'; Kosidis 35'; Tsouklis 59', 85'

Kypseli Stadium, Kypseli
Referee: Sarantos Lourmpeas (Piraeus)

Pavlos Melas won 5–2 on aggregate.

== Bracket ==
Round of 32
Irodotos	0	0	0
Ilisiakos	3	3	6
Paniliakos	0	0	0
Panionios	1	1	2
AEK Athens	3	4	7
Agios Dimitrios	0	1	1
Panathinaikos	2	1	3
Ionikos	0	0	0
Pavlos Melas	1	0	1
Kastoria	1	4	5
Ergotelis	3	0	3(1)
Ptolemaida-Lignitorikhi (p)	0	3	3(3)
Niki Volos	0	2	2
Iraklis	2	5	7
Olympiacos (a)	1	2	3
Kallithea	0	3	3
Atromitos	0	0	0
Aris	5	3	8
Agrotikos Asteras	2	0	2
Ethnikos Piraeus	3	0	3
Thyella Patras	2	1	3
OFI	1	5	5
Panserraikos	2	1	3
Apollon Kalamarias (a)	2	1	3
AEL	2	1	3
Apollon Athens	0	2	2
Kerkyra	2	0	2
Chalkidon Near East (a.e.t.)	0	3	3
Levadiakos	1	0	1
Skoda Xanthi	2	3	5
PAOK	0	0	0
Egaleo	2	0	2

Round of 16
Ilisiakos	0	0	0
Panionios	1	1	2
AEK Athens	1	3	4
Panathinaikos	1	1	2
Kastoria	2	2	4
Ptolemaida-Lignitorikhi	0	3	3
Iraklis	1	0	1
Olympiacos	0	2	2
Aris	2	2	4
Ethnikos Piraeus	1	1	2
OFI	1	0	1
Apollon Kalamarias (a)	1	0	1
AEL	3	0	3
Chalkidon Near East	1	1	2
Skoda Xanthi	1	0	1
Egaleo	0	0	0

Quarter-finals
Panionios	0	0	0
AEK Athens	0	2	2
Kastoria	2	1	3
Olympiacos	1	5	6
Aris (a)	0	1	1
Apollon Kalamarias	0	1	1
AEL	1	1	2
Skoda Xanthi	0	4	4

Semi-finals
AEK Athens	0	2	1
Olympiacos (a.e.t.)	1	1	3
Aris	1	2	3
Skoda Xanthi	2	0	2

Final
Olympiacos	3
Aris	0

== Round of 32 ==
=== Summary ===
Team 1	Agg.	Team 2	1st leg	2nd leg
Panathinaikos	3–0	Ionikos	2–0	1–0
AEL	3–2	Apollon Athens	2–0	1–2
Panserraikos	3–3 (a)	Apollon Kalamarias	2–2	1–1
Pavlos Melas	1–5	Kastoria	1–1	0–4
Niki Volos	2–7	Iraklis	0–2	2–5
Ergotelis	3–3 (1–3 p)	Ptolemaida-Lignitorikhi	3–0	0–3 (a.e.t.)
Thyella Patras	3–6	OFI	2–1	1–5
Levadiakos	1–5	Skoda Xanthi	1–2	0–3
Kerkyra	2–3	Chalkidon Near East	2–0	0–3 (a.e.t.)
Irodotos	0–6	Ilisiakos	0–3	0–3
AEK Athens	7–1	Agios Dimitrios	3–0	4–1
Paniliakos	0–2	Panionios	0–1	0–1
Agrotikos Asteras	2–3	Ethnikos Piraeus	2–3	0–0
PAOK	0–2	Egaleo	0–0	0–2
Olympiacos	(a) 3–3	Kallithea	1–0	2–3
Atromitos	0–8	Aris	0–5	0–3

=== Matches ===
15 December 2004
18:00 EET

Panathinaikos	2–0	Ionikos
Skácel 28'; Sapanis 88'	Report

Leoforos Alexandras Stadium, Ampelokipoi
Referee: Spyros Vasileiou (Elis)
12 January 2005
18:00 EET

Ionikos	0–1	Panathinaikos
	Report	Konstantinidis 85'

Neapolis Municipal Stadium, Nikaia
Referee: Dimitris Kalopoulos (Thessaloniki)

Panathinaikos won 3–0 on aggregate.

15 December 2004
14:45 EET

AEL	2–0	Apollon Athens
Alexandris 76', 88'	Report

Alcazar Stadium, Larissa
Referee: Theofilos Fotiadis (Thessaloniki)
4 January 2005
14:15 EET

Apollon Athens	2–1	AEL
Rodrigo 5' (pen.), 47'	Report	Alexandris 83' (pen.)

Georgios Kamaras Stadium, Rizoupoli
Referee: Nikos Athanasiou (Thesprotia)

AEL won 3–2 on aggregate.

15 December 2004
14:45 EET

Panserraikos	2–2	Apollon Kalamarias
Meserdis 25'; Mingas 66'	Report	Kyrou 19' (o.g.); Orfanos 85'

Serres Municipal Stadium, Serres
Referee: Giannis Kaminaris (Thessaly)
5 January 2005
19:00 EET

Apollon Kalamarias	1–1	Panserraikos
Pappas 47'	Report	Ziakas 83'

Kalamaria Stadium, Thessaloniki
Referee: Giannis Spyropoulos (Phthiotis)

Apollon Kalamarias won on away goals.

15 December 2004
14:45 EET

Pavlos Melas	1–1	Kastoria
Tsouklis 90+1'	Report	Efthymiadis 46'

Stavroupoli Stadium, Thessaloniki
Referee: Symeon Tsesmetzis (Serres)
12 January 2005
14:15 EET

Kastoria	4–0	Pavlos Melas
Athanasiadis 3', 19'; Panteliadis 80'; Efthymiadis 88'	Report

Municipal Stadium of Kastoria, Kastoria
Referee: Dimitrios Georgoulas (Grevena)

Kastoria won 5–1 on aggregate.

15 December 2004
15:00 EET

Niki Volos	0–2	Iraklis
	Report	Bakircioglu 32' (pen.), 41'

Pantelis Magoulas Stadium, Volos
Referee: Giorgos Takidis (Kilkis)
5 January 2005
14:15 EET

Iraklis	5–2	Niki Volos
Kapetanos 1', 29'; Bakircioglu 55', 67'; Anastasiadis 80' (o.g.)	Report	Balafas 11' (pen.); Androutsopoulos 13'

Kaftanzoglio Stadium, Thessaloniki
Referee: Frangiskos Somarakakis (Athens)

Iraklis won 7–2 on aggregate.

15 December 2004
14:45 EET

Ergotelis	3–0	Ptolemaida-Lignitorikhi
Gircha 22'; Pourzitidis 62' (o.g.); Ogunsoto 88' (pen.)	Report

Pankritio Stadium, Heraklion
Attendance: 100
Referee: Kostas Finokaliotis (Athens)
11 January 2005
14:15 EET

Ptolemaida-Lignitorikhi	3–0 (a.e.t.)	Ergotelis
Kaptiev 29'; Skentzos 40' (o.g.); Dimitriadis 47'	Report
Penalties
Milošeski (penalty missed); Tsoukalidis (penalty scored); Aliatidis (penalty scored); Kaptiev (penalty scored)	3–1	(penalty missed) Ogunsoto; (penalty missed) Eleftheriadis; (penalty scored) Pârvu; (penalty missed) Gircha

Ptolemaida Stadium, Ptolemaida
Referee: Avraam Kemparidis (Thessaloniki)

Ptolemaida-Lignitorikhi won 3–1 on penalties.

15 December 2004
14:45 EET

Thyella Patras	2–1	OFI
Alexandropoulos 25', 80'	Report	Deyanov 40' (pen.)

Fotis Aravantinos Stadium, Patras
Referee: Vasilis Terovitsas (Aetoloacarnania)
5 January 2005
14:15 EET

OFI	5–1	Thyella Patras
Belevonis 6'; Nwafor 42', 60'; Triantafyllou 65'; Deyanov 83'	Report	Alexandropoulos 89'

Theodoros Vardinogiannis Stadium, Heraklion
Referee: Christoforos Zografos (Athens)

OFI won 6–3 on aggregate.

22 December 2004
14:45 EET

Levadiakos	1–2	Skoda Xanthi
Massara 87'	Report	Prittas 9'; Maghradze 20'

Levadia Municipal Stadium, Livadeia
Referee: Giannis Tsachilidis (Piraeus)
12 January 2005
14:15 EET

Skoda Xanthi	3–0	Levadiakos
Nicácio 33', 65'; Pechlivanidis 39'	Report

Skoda Xanthi Arena, Xanthi
Referee: Kyros Vassaras (Thessaloniki)

Skoda Xanthi won 5–1 on aggregate.

22 December 2004
14:45 EET

Kerkyra	2–0	Chalkidon Near East
	Report	Ioannou 5'; Syros 78'

Kerkyra Stadium, Corfu
Referee: Giorgos Douros (Corinthia)
3 January 2005
19:00 EET

Chalkidon Near East	3–0 (a.e.t.)	Kerkyra
Dimos 3'; Al Zaher 67'; Korakakis 117'	Report

Pantelis Nikolaidis Stadium, Nikaia
Referee: Giorgos Kasnaferis (Argolida)

Chalkidon Near East won on extra time.

22 December 2004
14:45 EET

Irodotos	0–3	Ilisiakos
	Report	Dimoutsos 7'; Psarris 35'; Nitis 77' (pen.)

Municipal Nea Alikarnassos Stadium, Heraklion
Referee: Konstantinos Vasilias (Boeotia)
5 January 2005
14:15 EET

Ilisiakos	3–0	Irodotos
Kampas 5'; Plygos 18'; Karydis 90'	Report

Grigoris Lambrakis Stadium, Kallithea
Referee: Theodoros Triantafyllidis (Thessaloniki)

Ilisiakos won 6–0 on aggregate.

22 December 2004
15:00 EET

AEK Athens	3–0	Agios Dimitrios
Bruno Alves 74'; Konstantinidis 75', 90+2'	Report

Olympic Stadium, Marousi
Attendance: 763
Referee: Michael Koukoulakis (Heraklion)
11 January 2005
19:00 EET

Agios Dimitrios	1–4	AEK Athens
Rosales 5' (pen.)	Report	Soares 42'; Kampantais 64'; Bourbos 78'; Moras 85'

Agios Dimitrios Municipal Stadium, Agios Dimitrios
Attendance: 2,000
Referee: Antonis Kouklakis (Chania)

AEK Athens won 7–1 on aggregate.

22 December 2004
14:45 EET

Paniliakos	0–1	Panionios
	Report	Mantzios 83'

Pyrgos Stadium, Pyrgos
Referee: Gerasimos Mazarakis (Kefalonia)
3 January 2005
15:00 EET

Panionios	1–0	Paniliakos
Breška 23'	Report

Nea Smyrni Stadium, Nea Smyrni
Referee: Dimitrios Styliaras (Aetoloacarnania)

Panionios won 2–0 on aggregate.

22 December 2004
14:45 EET

Agrotikos Asteras	2–3	Ethnikos Piraeus
Barbas 22'; Dandanas 80'	Report	Vidalis 30'; De Sousa 53'; Prodan 61'

Agrotikos Asteras Stadium, Thessaloniki
Referee: Athanasios Vasiliou (Thessaly)
5 January 2005
14:15 EET

Ethnikos Piraeus	0–0	Agrotikos Asteras
	Report

Nikaia Municipal Stadium, Nikaia
Referee: Michalis Tsiniaris (Athens)

Ethnikos Piraeus won 3–2 on aggregate.

22 December 2004
14:45 EET

PAOK	0–0	Egaleo
	Report

Toumba Stadium, Thessaloniki
Referee: Iraklis Tsikinis (Messinia)
12 January 2005
16:00 EET

Egaleo	2–0	PAOK
Makris 76'; Barkoglou 83'	Report

Stavros Mavrothalassitis Stadium, Aigaleo
Referee: Giorgos Douros (Corinthia)

Egaleo won 2–0 on aggregate.

22 December 2004
19:00 EET

Olympiacos	1–0	Kallithea
Castillo 3'	Report

Karaiskakis Stadium, Piraeus
Referee: Anastasios Kakos (Corfu)
12 January 2005
19:00 EET

Kallithea	3–2	Olympiacos
Tsigas 38'; Kyriakos 61'; Gekas 65'	Report	Kafes 58'; Okkas 69'

Grigoris Lambrakis Stadium, Kallithea
Attendance: 1,352
Referee: Giorgos Takidis (Kilkis)

Olympiacos won on away goals.

5 January 2005
14:45 EET

Atromitos	0–5	Aris
	Report	Markomichalis 37'; Nebegleras 49', 55' (pen.), 80'; Papadopoulos 83'

Peristeri Stadium, Peristeri
Referee: Giannis Tsachilidis (Piraeus)
12 January 2005
14:15 EET

Aris	3–0	Atromitos
Abelas 51'; Moysiadis 72'; Koltsidas 90+1'	Report

Kleanthis Vikelidis Stadium, Thessaloniki
Referee: Makis Efthimiadis (Drama)

Aris won 8–0 on aggregate.

== Round of 16 ==
=== Summary ===
Team 1	Agg.	Team 2	1st leg	2nd leg
Iraklis	1–2	Olympiacos	1–0	0–2
Kastoria	4–3	Ptolemaida-Lignitorikhi	2–0	2–3
Aris	4–2	Ethnikos Piraeus	2–1	2–1
Skoda Xanthi	1–0	Egaleo	1–0	0–0
Ilisiakos	0–2	Panionios	0–1	0–1
AEL	3–2	Chalkidon Near East	3–1	0–1
OFI	1–1 (a)	Apollon Kalamarias	1–1	0–0
AEK Athens	4–2	Panathinaikos	1–1	3–1

=== Matches ===
19 January 2005
19:00 EET

Iraklis	1–0	Olympiacos
Kapetanos 2'	Report

Kaftanzoglio Stadium, Thessaloniki
Attendance: 4,279
Referee: Charalampos Karatzas (Euboea)
2 February 2005
19:00 EET

Olympiacos	2–0	Iraklis
Abaris 27' (o.g.); Rivaldo 85'	Report

Karaiskakis Stadium, Piraeus
Referee: Frangiskos Somarakakis (Athens)

Olympiacos won 2–1 on aggregate.

9 February 2005
17:00 EET

Kastoria	2–0	Ptolemaida-Lignitorikhi
Angos 42'; Lazaridis 84'	Report

Municipal Stadium of Kastoria, Kastoria
Referee: Dimitris Kalopoulos (Thessaloniki)
16 February 2005
14:30 EET

Ptolemaida-Lignitorikhi	3–2	Kastoria
Kaptiev 4', 14'; Aliatidis 56'	Report	Soultanidis 62', 87'

Emilios Theofanidis Stadium, Ptolemaida
Referee: Nikolaos Tsakiridis (Serres)

Kastoria won 4–3 on aggregate.

26 January 2005
16:00 EET

Aris	2–1	Ethnikos Piraeus
Lazanas 3'; Kouemaha 80'	Report	Tzimas 9'

Kleanthis Vikelidis Stadium, Thessaloniki
Referee: Giannis Kaminaris (Thessaly)
3 February 2005
16:00 EET

Ethnikos Piraeus	1–2	Aris
De Souza 49'	Report	Nebegleras 58'; Kouemaha 90+1'

Nikaia Municipal Stadium, Nikaia
Referee: Thanasis Briakos (Epirus)

Aris won 4–2 on aggregate.

27 January 2005
16:00 EET

Skoda Xanthi	1–0	Egaleo
Labriakos 33'	Report

Skoda Xanthi Arena, Xanthi
Referee: Giorgos Kasnaferis (Argolida)
5 February 2005
14:30 EET

Egaleo	0–0	Skoda Xanthi
	Report

Stavros Mavrothalassitis Stadium, Egaleo
Referee: Kyros Vassaras (Thessaloniki)

Skoda Xanthi won 1–0 on aggregate.

19 January 2005
15:00 EET

Ilisiakos	0–1	Panionios
	Report	Meszároš 32'

Grigoris Lambrakis Stadium, Kallithea
Referee: Vasilis Skoufitsas (Athens)
25 January 2005
14:30 EET

Panionios	1–0	Ilisiakos
Marcora 70'	Report

Nea Smyrni Stadium, Nea Smyrni
Referee: Frangiskos Somarakakis (Athens)

Panionios won 1–0 on aggregate.

26 January 2005
16:00 EET

AEL	3–1	Chalkidon Near East
Kyparissis 72'; Grigoriou 75'; Floros 80'	Report	Formiga 90+3' (pen.)

Alcazar Stadium, Larissa
Referee: Dimitris Dabosis (Pieria)
2 February 2005
14:30 EET

Chalkidon Near East	1–0	AEL
Moyo 90+1'	Report

Pantelis Nikolaidis Stadium, Nikaia
Referee: Kostas Finokaliotis (Athens)

AEL won 3–2 on aggregate.

19 January 2005
16:00 EET

OFI	1–1	Apollon Kalamarias
Nwafor 19'	Report	Orfanos 87'

Theodoros Vardinogiannis Stadium, Heraklion
Referee: Kostas Finokaliotis (Athens)
2 February 2005
15:00 EET

Apollon Kalamarias	0–0	OFI
	Report

Kalamaria Stadium, Thessaloniki
Referee: Makis Efthimiadis (Drama)

Apollon Kalamarias won away goals.

27 January 2005
19:00 EET

AEK Athens	1–1	Panathinaikos
Liberopoulos 90+4'	Report	Konstantinou 47'

Olympic Stadium, Marousi
Attendance: 17,280
Referee: Iraklis Tsikinis (Messinia)
3 February 2005
19:00 EET

Panathinaikos	1–3	AEK Athens
Konstantinou 51'	Report	Katsouranis 7' (pen.); Soares 55'; Ivić 77'

Leoforos Alexandras Stadium, Ampelokipoi
Attendance: 5,153
Referee: Vasilis Terovitsas (Aetoloacarnania)

AEK Athens won 4–2 on aggregate.

== Quarter-finals ==
=== Summary ===
Team 1	Agg.	Team 2	1st leg	2nd leg
Panionios	0–2	AEK Athens	0–0	0–2
Kastoria	3–6	Olympiacos	2–1	1–5
Aris	(a) 1–1	Apollon Kalamarias	0–0	1–1
AEL	2–4	Skoda Xanthi	1–0	1–4

=== Matches ===
2 March 2005
19:00 EET

Panionios	0–0	AEK Athens
	Report

Nea Smyrni Stadium, Nea Smyrni
Attendance: 3,000
Referee: Giorgos Kasnaferis (Argolida)
16 March 2005
19:00 EET

AEK Athens	2–0	Panionios
Júlio César 10'; Liberopoulos 23'	Report

Olympic Stadium, Marousi
Attendance: 8,000
Referee: Kyros Vassaras (Thessaloniki)

AEK Athens won 2–0 on aggregate.

2 March 2005
16:00 EET

Kastoria	2–1	Olympiacos
Soultanidis 17', 52'	Report	D'Acol 29'

Athletic Center of Kastoria, Kastoria
Referee: Dimitris Takidis (Kilkis)
24 March 2005
19:00 EET

Olympiacos	5–1	Kastoria
Stoltidis 4'; Okkas 10', 24'; Taralidis 14'; Georgatos 31' (pen.)	Report	Athanasiadis 85'

Karaiskakis Stadium, Piraeus
Attendance: 2,120
Referee: Spyros Vasileiou (Elis)

Olympiacos won 6–3 on aggregate.

9 March 2005

Aris	0–0	Apollon Kalamarias
	Report

Kleanthis Vikelidis Stadium, Thessaloniki
Referee: Vasilis Skoufitsas (Athens)
17 March 2005

Apollon Kalamarias	1–1	Aris
Vela Junior 43'	Report	Papadopoulos 39'

Kalamaria Stadium, Thessaloniki
Referee: Giannis Kaminaris (Thessaly)

Aris won on away goals.

10 March 2005

AEL	1–0	Skoda Xanthi
Digozis 20' (pen.)	Report

Alcazar Stadium, Larissa
Referee: Thanasis Briakos (Epirus)
23 March 2005

Skoda Xanthi	4–1	AEL
Labriakos 59'; Garpozis 65'; Luciano 75', 90' (pen.)	Report	Makris 83'

Skoda Xanthi Arena, Xanthi
Referee: Iraklis Tsikinis (Messinia)

Skoda Xanthi won 4–2 on aggregate.

== Semi-finals ==
=== Summary ===
Team 1	Agg.	Team 2	1st leg	2nd leg
AEK Athens	1–3	Olympiacos	0–1	1–2 (a.e.t.)
Aris	3–2	Skoda Xanthi	1–2	2–0

=== Matches ===
13 April 2005

Aris	1–2	Skoda Xanthi
Lazanas 60' (pen.)	Report	Maghradze 31'; Kazakis 88'

Kleanthis Vikelidis Stadium, Thessaloniki
Referee: Christoforos Zografos (Athens)
27 April 2005

Skoda Xanthi	0–2	Aris
	Report	Beniskos 9', 49'

Skoda Xanthi Arena, Xanthi
Referee: Vasilis Terovitsas (Aetoloacarnania)

Aris won 3–2 on aggregate.

20 April 2005
19:00 EEST

AEK Athens	0–1	Olympiacos
	Report	Đorđević 8'

Olympic Stadium, Marousi
Attendance: 29,851
Referee: Dimitris Takidis (Kilkis)
27 April 2005
19:00 EEST

Olympiacos	2–1 (a.e.t.)	AEK Athens
Moras 97' (o.g.); Okkas 118'	Report	Liberopoulos 42'

Karaiskakis Stadium, Piraeus
Attendance: 27,441
Referee: Charalampos Karatzas (Euboea)

Olympiacos won 3–1 on aggregate.

== Final ==
21 May 2005
19:00 EEST

Olympiacos	3–0	Aris
Đorđević 56' (pen.), 90'; Rivaldo 70'	Report

Pampeloponnisiako Stadium, Patras
Attendance: 15,550
Referee: Giorgos Kasnaferis (Athens)

== Top scorers ==
Rank	Player	Club	Goals
1	(Greece) Ilias Ioannou	Kerkyra	5
1	(Greece) Panagiotis Tsouklis	Pavlos Melas	5
3	(Greece) Alexis Alexandris	AEL	4
3	(Brazil) Rodrigo Mucarbel	Apollon Athens	4
3	(Greece) Konstantinos Angos	Kastoria / Doxa Drama	4
3	(Greece) Nikos Soultanidis	Kastoria	4
3	(Sweden) Kennedy Bakircioglu	Iraklis	4
3	(Bulgaria) Rosen Kaptiev	Ptolemaida-Lignitorikhi	4
3	(Greece) Christos Athanasiadis	Kastoria	4
3	(Greece) Ioakim Beniskos	Kalamata / Aris	4
3	(Cyprus) Ioannis Okkas	Olympiacos	4
3	(Greece) Konstantinos Nebegleras	Aris	4
