= 2003–04 Gamma Ethniki =

Gamma Ethniki
- Season: 2003–04
- Champions: Kastoria
- Promoted: Kastoria; AEL; Ilisiakos
- Relegated: Chalkida; Leonidio; Pontiakos Nea Santa; Kilkisiakos

The 2003–04 Gamma Ethniki was the 21st season since the official establishment of the third tier of Greek football in 1983. Kastoria was crowned champion, thus winning promotion to Beta Ethniki. AEL also won promotion as a runner-up, and Ilisiakos was also promoted after defeating PAS Giannina 3-1 in a single play-off match at Pyrgos Stadium between the 14th placed team of Beta Ethniki and the 3rd placed team of Gamma Ethniki.

Chalkida, Leonidio, Pontiakos Nea Santa and Kilkisiakos were relegated to Delta Ethniki.

== League table ==
Location of teams in 2003–04 Gamma Ethniki

Pos	Team	Pld	W	D	L	GF	GA	GD	Pts	Promotion or relegation
1	Kastoria (C, P)	38	25	5	8	67	27	+40	80	Promotion to Beta Ethniki
2	AEL (P)	38	24	5	9	58	34	+24	77	Promotion to Beta Ethniki
3	Ilisiakos (P)	38	22	10	6	65	26	+39	76	Qualification for Promotion play-off
4	Thrasyvoulos	38	20	11	7	51	28	+23	71	
5	Agrotikos Asteras	38	16	13	9	54	39	+15	61	
6	Rodos	38	16	11	11	59	43	+16	59	
7	Acharnaikos	38	16	11	11	46	38	+8	59	
8	Veria	38	15	12	11	46	38	+8	57	
9	Atsalenios	38	14	12	12	48	42	+6	54	
10	Doxa Drama	38	14	8	16	40	38	+2	50	
11	Chalkida (Note: Chalkida relegated to Evia FCA championship due to unsettled debts.) (R)	38	13	11	14	39	43	−4	50	Relegation to FCA championships
12	Marko	38	14	7	17	42	42	0	49	
13	Agios Dimitrios	38	12	11	15	46	50	−4	47	
14	Thyella Patras	38	12	11	15	29	35	−6	47	
15	Vyzas	38	11	11	16	37	52	−15	44	
16	ILTEX Lykoi	38	11	10	17	41	44	−3	43	
17	Kavala	38	12	7	19	31	44	−13	43	
18	Leonidio (R)	38	9	4	25	27	59	−32	31	Relegation to Delta Ethniki
19	Pontiakos Nea Santa (R)	38	7	6	25	19	70	−51	27	Relegation to Delta Ethniki
20	Kilkisiakos (R)	38	6	6	26	26	79	−53	24	Relegation to Delta Ethniki

(C) Champions; (P) Promoted; (R) Relegated

== Results ==
Home \ Away	ACH	AEL	AGD	AGR	ATS	CHL	DOX	ILS	LYK	KAS	KAV	KIL	LEO	MAR	PNS	ROD	THR	THY	VER	VYZ
Acharnaikos		2–1	2–1	2–2	0–0	0–0	1–1	0–0	2–3	1–0	0–0	3–2	2–0	2–0	4–0	1–0	2–1	3–0	2–2	1–0
AEL	1–0		1–1	1–1	3–1	0–2	0–1	2–0	1–0	3–0	2–0	3–2	1–0	1–0	5–1	3–0	1–0	1–0	1–0	2–1
Agios Dimitrios	1–2	1–0		1–1	2–1	1–2	3–1	1–0	1–4	0–2	1–0	4–1	1–0	1–1	2–0	0–0	1–0	1–1	5–0	0–0
Agrotikos Asteras	1–1	1–2	3–2		2–1	1–1	0–0	2–0	2–1	2–0	1–1	3–1	2–0	0–0	3–0	2–2	0–0	3–1	2–1	1–1
Atsalenios	4–0	3–1	3–1	2–1		3–0	1–0	0–0	1–0	1–1	2–1	3–0	1–0	2–1	1–2	1–0	1–3	0–0	3–3	1–0
Chalkida	2–2	0–2	0–2	1–3	1–0		1–0	2–0	3–1	2–1	2–0	2–0	1–0	2–2	1–0	1–2	0–0	0–0	1–2	3–3
Doxa Drama	2–0	1–2	3–2	0–1	1–1	1–0		0–1	1–1	2–1	1–0	3–0	4–0	3–0	2–0	0–0	0–0	1–0	1–0	3–0
Ilisiakos	2–1	2–1	4–0	2–1	2–1	3–0	2–1		1–1	0–2	1–1	8–0	1–0	2–0	5–0	1–0	0–0	2–0	2–0	3–2
ILTEX Lykoi	0–1	0–1	2–0	1–2	2–2	1–1	1–1	0–2		0–2	3–1	2–0	2–0	1–1	1–0	0–1	0–1	0–1	0–0	2–0
Kastoria	2–0	3–3	4–1	1–0	2–0	1–0	1–0	0–3	3–1		1–0	2–1	5–0	3–1	4–1	1–0	3–1	1–0	2–0	6–0
Kavala	1–0	2–3	2–1	1–4	1–0	0–0	3–0	1–2	1–0	0–0		1–0	2–0	1–0	2–0	1–2	0–0	2–0	1–3	0–0
Kilkisiakos	0–4	0–1	1–1	1–1	2–1	0–2	0–0	0–0	1–1	0–4	0–1		1–0	1–0	1–1	1–4	1–2	2–1	0–3	1–2
Leonidio	2–3	1–1	1–0	0–1	0–0	3–0	3–2	0–4	0–1	2–0	2–0	0–1		4–1	3–0	0–0	0–1	1–1	0–1	1–0
Marko	1–0	0–1	0–0	2–0	1–1	1–2	1–0	3–1	2–0	1–0	1–0	2–0	1–0		4–0	2–3	0–0	2–0	1–0	2–1
Pontiakos Nea Santa	0–0	1–3	2–1	2–1	0–0	2–1	1–3	0–4	0–2	0–0	1–0	2–1	2–0	0–5		0–3	0–1	0–1	0–0	0–1
Rodos	2–0	2–1	3–4	1–2	5–2	2–1	4–1	0–0	2–2	0–2	1–2	1–0	5–2	1–0	2–0		2–2	5–1	1–1	0–0
Thrasyvoulos	1–0	1–0	1–1	2–1	2–1	0–0	3–0	2–2	3–2	1–2	4–1	4–2	1–2	3–0	1–0	3–2		1–0	2–0	3–0
Thyella Patras	0–1	0–0	0–0	2–1	0–0	1–0	1–0	1–1	1–2	0–0	2–0	3–0	2–0	2–1	1–0	2–0	0–1		0–0	3–0
Veria	1–1	1–2	0–0	2–0	1–1	1–1	2–0	0–0	2–1	0–1	2–0	4–2	3–0	2–1	1–0	1–1	1–0	2–0		4–1
Vyzas	2–0	3–1	2–1	0–0	1–2	2–1	1–0	1–2	0–0	0–4	2–1	0–1	5–0	2–1	1–1	0–0	0–0	1–1	2–0	

Legend: Blue = home team win; Yellow = draw; Red = away team win.

== Promotion play-off ==
6 June 2004

PAS Giannina	1–3	Ilisiakos
Mitsiopoulos 53'		Kampas 3', 68'; Pargianos 77'

Pyrgos Stadium, Pyrgos
Referee: Giorgos Douros (Corinthia)

== Top scorers ==
Rank	Player	Club	Goals
1	(Greece) Michalis Klokidis	Rodos	29
2	(Greece) Panagiotis Kyparissis	Acharnaikos	20
3	(Greece) Nikolaos Soultanidis	Kastoria	19
4	(Slovakia) Rastislav Ján Lazorík	AEL	16
4	(Greece) Christos Velonis	Agrotikos Asteras	16
6	(Greece) Ilias Kampas	Ilisiakos	15
