= 2003–04 Beta Ethniki =

Beta Ethniki
- Season: 2003–04
- Dates: 24 August 2003 – 23 May 2004
- Champions: Kerkyra
- Promoted: Kerkyra; Apollon Kalamarias; Ergotelis
- Relegated: Kassandra; Patraikos; PAS Giannina; Fostiras

Beta Ethniki 2003–04 complete season.

== League table ==
Location of teams in 2003–04 Beta Ethniki

Pos	Team	Pld	W	D	L	GF	GA	GD	Pts	Promotion or relegation
1	Kerkyra (C, P)	30	20	7	3	42	13	+29	67	Promotion to Alpha Ethniki
2	Apollon Kalamarias (P)	30	17	7	6	53	27	+26	58	Promotion to Alpha Ethniki
3	Ergotelis (P)	30	16	7	7	38	24	+14	55	Qualification for Promotion play-off
4	Kassandra (Note: Kassandra was merged after the season with Olympiacos Volos.)	30	15	8	7	37	23	+14	53	Merged and dissolved
5	Poseidon Neon Poron	30	15	7	8	42	23	+19	52	
6	Niki Volos	30	13	10	7	31	18	+13	49	
7	Ethnikos Asteras	30	12	9	9	35	28	+7	45	
8	Levadiakos	30	12	7	11	30	31	−1	43	
9	Kalamata	30	11	8	11	27	27	0	41	
10	Apollon Smyrnis	30	11	8	11	36	37	−1	41	
11	Patraikos (Note: Patraikos was merged at start of the next season with Panachaiki.)	30	9	13	8	28	25	+3	40	Merged and dissolved
12	Panserraikos	30	10	10	10	31	31	0	40	
13	Atromitos	30	10	7	13	33	45	−12	37	
14	PAS Giannina (R)	30	8	7	15	26	31	−5	31	Qualification for Relegation play-off
15	Fostiras (Note: Fostiras and Panachaiki were excluded from the competition because they were denied a license after the matches in round 1; they continued playing after winning an initial court case but meanwhile their relegation to the 4th level has been decided; all their matches starting from round 2 on are awarded 0–2 against them, to the obvious dismay of Kerkyra and Patraikos, who had their protests rejected. However, Panachaiki were merged with Patraikos at the start of next season.) (R)	28	1	0	27	2	55	−53	3	Relegation to Delta Ethniki
16	Panachaiki	28	0	1	27	1	55	−54	1	Spared from relegation

(C) Champions; (P) Promoted; (R) Relegated

== Results ==
Home \ Away	APL	APS	ATR	ERG	ETA	FOS	KAL	KSN	KER	LEV	NVL	PCK	PSE	PAS	PTR	POS
Apollon Kalamarias		5–2	2–0	2–0	1–0	2–0 (Note: The opponents of Fostiras awarded a 2–0 w/o win each.)	2–1	1–1	1–2	2–0	2–0	2–0 (Note: The opponents of Panachaiki awarded a 2–0 w/o win each.)	5–2	3–0	1–1	0–1
Apollon Smyrnis	2–0		3–1	0–1	2–0	2–0	2–2	0–1	2–3	0–0	0–0	2–0	2–1	1–1	1–0	1–1
Atromitos	0–0	2–1		2–0	2–3	2–0	2–0	1–1	0–0	0–1	1–1	2–0	1–0	2–0	3–1	1–3
Ergotelis	1–1	1–0	2–1		2–1	2–0	3–0	2–0	1–0	0–2	1–1	2–0	0–0	2–0	3–0	1–0
Ethnikos Asteras	2–3	0–0	0–0	1–1		2–0	1–1	1–0	1–2	2–1	0–0	2–0	2–0	2–1	1–1	2–1
Fostiras	0–2	0–2	0–2	0–2	0–2		0–2	0–2	0–2	0–2	0–2	— (Note: Did not held)	0–2	0–2	2–1	0–2
Kalamata	1–0	1–1	3–2	1–1	1–0	2–0		0–0	0–2	1–2	1–0	2–0	0–0	1–0	1–0	0–0
Kassandra	3–2	5–0	3–1	3–1	3–2	2–0	0–2		0–1	1–0	1–0	2–0	0–0	1–0	0–0	2–1
Kerkyra	2–3	2–0	3–0	0–0	3–0	2–0	1–0	4–1		2–0	1–0	2–0	2–1	0–0	1–0	0–2
Levadiakos	1–1	1–4	2–2	2–1	0–3	2–0	2–1	0–0	0–2		1–0	2–0	0–1	2–0	2–2	1–1
Niki Volos	1–1	1–0	4–0	2–0	0–0	2–0	1–0	1–0	0–0	1–0		2–0	3–3	1–0	1–2	3–2
Panachaiki	0–2	0–2	0–2	0–2	0–2	— (Note: Did not held)	0–2	0–2	1–1	0–2	0–2		0–2	0–2	0–2	0–2
Panserraikos	1–4	1–2	1–1	2–2	0–0	2–0	1–1	1–0	0–1	2–0	0–0	2–0		3–2	0–0	2–0
PAS Giannina	0–1	1–0	3–0	2–3	0–1	2–0	1–0	0–1	0–0	1–1	0–1	2–0	2–0		0–0	1–1
Patraikos	0–0	1–1	3–0	0–2	1–0	2–0	2–0	2–2	0–0	2–1	1–1	2–0	1–0	1–1		0–0
Poseidon Neon Poron	3–2	5–1	5–0	1–0	2–2	2–0	1–0	0–0	0–1	0–0	1–0	2–0	0–1	3–2	1–0	

Legend: Blue = home team win; Yellow = draw; Red = away team win.

== Promotion play-off ==
30 May 2004

Ergotelis	1–0	Akratitos
Sylla 90+1'

Makedonikos Stadium, Thessaloniki
Attendance: 891
Referee: Kyros Vassaras (Thessaloniki)

Ergotelis were promoted to 2004–05 Alpha Ethniki. Akratitos were relegated to 2004–05 Beta Ethniki.

== Relegation play-off ==
6 June 2004

PAS Giannina	1–3	Ilisiakos
Mitsiopoulos 53'	Report	Kampas 3', 68'; Pargianos 77'

Pyrgos Stadium, Pyrgos
Referee: Giorgos Douros (Corinthia)

Ilisiakos were promoted to 2004–05 Beta Ethniki. PAS Giannina were relegated to 2004–05 Gamma Ethniki.

== Top scorers ==
Rank	Player	Club	Goals
1	(Brazil) Cleyton	Apollon Kalamarias	15
2	(Brazil) Formiga	Atromitos	12
2	(Greece) Sokratis Boudouris	Poseidon Neon Poron	12
4	(Greece) Charilaos Pappas	Apollon Kalamarias	10
5	(Greece) Ilias Anastasakos	Apollon Smyrnis	9
5	(Nigeria) Patrick Ogunsoto	Ergotelis	9
5	(Greece) Georgios Trichias	Kalamata	9
8	(Greece) Savvas Giannakidis	Ethnikos Asteras	7
8	(Greece) Ilias Ioannou	Kerkyra	7
8	(Greece) Konstantinos Kormaris	Kassandra	7
