= 2008–09 Beta Ethniki =

Beta Ethniki
- Season: 2008–09
- Dates: 13 September 2008 – 18 May 2009
- Champions: Atromitos
- Promoted: Atromitos; PAS Giannina; Kavala
- Relegated: Apollon Kalamarias; Veria; Kallithea; Kastoria
- Matches: 306
- Goals: 653 (2.13 per match)
- Top goalscorer: Nikos Soultanidis (21 goals)
- Biggest home win: PAS Giannina 5–0 Veria; PAS Giannina 5–0 Diagoras
- Biggest away win: Agrotikos Asteras 1–4 Kallithea
- Highest scoring: Ethikos Asteras 4–3 Diagoras; Ethnikos 4–3 Kallithea

Beta Ethniki 2008–09 complete season.

== Overview ==
- The season started on 14 September 2008 and was scheduled to end on 17 May 2009.
- Last season champions Panserraikos, runners-up Thrasyvoulos and third-placed Panthrakikos earned promotion to Super League Greece, while Agios Dimitrios, Chaidari and Egaleo were relegated to Gamma Ethniki (see 2007–08 Beta Ethniki).
- Apollon Kalamarias, Veria and Atromitos will compete in Beta Ethniki this season after being relegated from the Super League in 2007–08.
- Diagoras, Kavala, and Anagennisi Karditsa will compete in Beta Ethniki this season after earning promotion from Gamma Ethniki in 2007–08.

== League table ==
Location of teams in 2008–09 Beta Ethniki

Pos	Team	Pld	W	D	L	GF	GA	GD	Pts	Promotion or relegation
1	Atromitos (C, P)	34	22	8	4	54	30	+24	74	Promotion to Super League
2	PAS Giannina (P)	34	20	9	5	70	36	+34	69	Promotion to Super League
3	Kavala (P)	34	19	8	7	56	28	+28	65	Promotion to Super League
4	Ionikos	34	15	10	9	43	37	+6	55	
5	Kerkyra	34	14	9	11	45	40	+5	51	
6	Ilisiakos	34	13	7	14	42	40	+2	46	Merged with Egaleo (Note: Ilisiakos at the end of the season merged with Egaleo to form Egaleo A.O.)
7	Agrotikos Asteras	34	13	6	15	39	39	0	45	
8	Diagoras	34	11	11	12	46	38	+8	44	
9	Kalamata	34	11	10	13	33	43	−10	43	
10	Pierikos	34	11	9	14	33	43	−10	42	
11	Olympiacos Volos	34	9	14	11	32	36	−4	41	
12	Apollon Kalamarias (R)	34	11	8	15	34	45	−11	41	Relegation to Delta Ethniki (Note: Apollon Kalamarias relegated to Delta Ethniki due to unsettled debts.)
13	Ethnikos Piraeus	34	8	16	10	42	41	+1	40	
14	Ethnikos Asteras	34	11	7	16	40	41	−1	40	
15	Anagennisi Karditsa	34	10	9	15	30	43	−13	39	
16	Veria (Note: Veria has a three-point detraction for the game against Ilisiakos. The match interrupted at the end of the first half, due to attack from Veria's owner to the referee. The score was 0-0 at that point.) (R)	34	10	11	13	27	46	−19	38	Relegation to Gamma Ethniki
17	Kallithea (R)	34	7	13	14	25	43	−18	34	Relegation to Gamma Ethniki
18	Kastoria (R)	34	3	11	20	29	61	−32	20	Relegation to Gamma Ethniki

Source: Soccerway
(C) Champions; (P) Promoted; (R) Relegated

== Results ==
Home \ Away	AGR	KRD	APL	ATR	DIA	ETA	ETH	ILS	ION	KAL	KLT	KAS	KAV	KER	OLV	PAS	PIE	VER
Agrotikos Asteras		3–0	1–0	0–1	0–0	3–0	1–2	0–0	1–0	2–0	2–0	1–0	0–2	2–0	2–1	2–1	4–0	0–1
Anagennisi Karditsa	1–2		1–0	0–1	2–1	1–0	1–1	2–1	0–3	0–0	1–1	1–1	3–0	2–0	0–0	1–3	1–0	2–1
Apollon Kalamarias	0–0	2–2		1–1	2–0	0–1	0–0	3–2	0–3	2–1	2–1	2–0	0–2	1–3	1–0	1–3	1–1	0–0
Atromitos	2–1	1–0	3–1		2–1	3–0	2–1	0–0	0–0	4–0	1–0	2–1	2–1	2–2	2–0	2–1	2–1	4–0
Diagoras	2–1	4–1	1–0	0–1		1–3	2–2	1–1	0–0	3–0	0–0	5–1	0–2	2–0	0–1	2–0	3–1	1–0
Ethnikos Asteras	3–0	0–0	0–1	2–2	2–1		2–1	1–1	3–1	1–1	3–0	2–0	0–1	4–2	2–0	0–0	3–0	2–2
Ethnikos Piraeus	2–0	1–1	2–1	0–0	1–1	1–0		2–3	1–2	1–1	0–0	1–1	2–0	1–1	1–0	0–2	2–1	1–1
Ilisiakos	3–2	0–1	1–2	1–2	2–1	1–0	3–2		2–0	3–0	2–1	0–0	1–0	0–1	1–0	1–1	2–3	0–1
Ionikos	2–0	3–1	1–0	0–1	1–0	3–2	0–4	1–0		1–0	0–0	2–0	2–2	1–1	4–4	1–1	2–2	1–0
Kalamata	3–2	0–0	1–0	3–3	2–2	1–0	1–1	1–1	3–1		2–0	2–1	0–1	0–0	0–0	2–1	1–0	2–0
Kallithea	0–0	1–0	3–2	0–2	2–2	2–1	2–2	1–0	0–2	3–0		1–1	1–1	0–0	1–0	0–1	1–1	0–1
Kastoria	1–2	2–1	2–3	0–1	1–5	2–2	1–1	0–4	2–3	1–3	0–0		2–2	2–3	0–0	1–1	1–1	0–2
Kavala	4–1	5–1	0–1	5–0	3–1	0–0	2–2	2–0	0–1	3–0	2–0	2–1		1–0	2–1	2–1	2–0	2–0
Kerkyra	2–0	1–0	0–1	2–1	1–1	3–2	2–0	2–0	2–0	2–1	2–1	1–2	0–0		2–3	2–2	2–1	3–1
Olympiacos Volos 1937	3–2	1–0	2–0	1–1	0–1	2–0	3–2	0–1	1–1	2–0	1–0	0–0	0–0	1–1		1–1	1–1	1–1
PAS Giannina	2–2	2–1	5–1	2–1	1–1	1–0	2–1	6–2	2–1	2–1	8–1	3–1	3–1	2–1	5–2		2–0	1–0
Pierikos	1–0	2–1	1–1	2–0	2–1	2–1	2–1	1–0	2–0	1–2	0–0	2–0	1–3	1–0	0–0	0–0		0–2
Veria	1–1	0–1	2–2	1–3	0–0	1–0	0–0	0–3	0–0	1–0	1–2	2–0	1–1	2–1	0–0	1–2	1–0	

Source: Soccerway
Legend: Blue = home team win; Yellow = draw; Red = away team win.

== Top scorers ==
Rank	Player	Club	Goals
1	(Greece) Nikos Soultanidis	Kavala	21
2	(Greece) Georgios Saitiotis	PAS Giannina	19
3	(Greece) Ilias Solakis	PAS Giannina	18
3	(Greece) Ilias Kampas	Ilisiakos	18
5	(Greece) Ilias Ioannou	Olympiacos Volos	15
6	(Brazil) Luiz Brito	Atromitos	14
7	(Greece) Anastasios Triantafyllou	Diagoras	13
8	(Guatemala) Israel Silva	Kerkyra	12
