= 2006–07 Beta Ethniki =

Beta Ethniki
- Season: 2006–07
- Dates: 10 September 2006 – 3 June 2007
- Champions: Asteras Tripolis
- Promoted: Asteras Tripolis; Levadiakos; Veria
- Relegated: Proodeftiki; Messiniakos; Niki Volos
- Top goalscorer: Ilias Solakis (21 goals)
- Biggest home win: PAS Giannina 5–0 Veria; PAS Giannina 5–0 Diagoras
- Biggest away win: Agrotikos Asteras 1–4 Kallithea
- Highest scoring: Eth. Asteras 4–3 Diagoras; Ethnikos 4–3 Kallithea -->

Beta Ethniki 2006–07 complete season.

== League table ==
Location of teams in 2006–07 Beta Ethniki

| Pos | Team | Pld | W | D | L | GF | GA | GD | Pts | Promotion or relegation |
|---|---|---|---|---|---|---|---|---|---|---|
| 1 | Asteras Tripolis (C, P) | 34 | 20 | 9 | 5 | 56 | 25 | +31 | 69 | Promotion to Super League |
| 2 | Levadiakos (P) | 34 | 21 | 5 | 8 | 49 | 33 | +16 | 68 | Promotion to Super League |
| 3 | Veria (P) | 34 | 16 | 11 | 7 | 46 | 26 | +20 | 59 | Promotion to Super League |
| 4 | Kastoria | 34 | 16 | 9 | 9 | 55 | 40 | +15 | 57 | |
| 5 | PAS Giannina | 34 | 14 | 11 | 9 | 49 | 34 | +15 | 53 | |
| 6 | Ethnikos Piraeus | 34 | 15 | 4 | 15 | 35 | 33 | +2 | 49 | |
| 7 | Kallithea | 34 | 13 | 8 | 13 | 45 | 42 | +3 | 47 | |
| 8 | Thrasyvoulos | 34 | 13 | 8 | 13 | 37 | 48 | −11 | 47 | |
| 9 | Agrotikos Asteras | 34 | 11 | 11 | 12 | 35 | 38 | −3 | 44 | |
| 10 | Kalamata | 34 | 11 | 10 | 13 | 36 | 40 | −4 | 43 | |
| 11 | Panthrakikos | 34 | 12 | 6 | 16 | 40 | 44 | −4 | 42 | |
| 12 | Ilisiakos | 34 | 11 | 9 | 14 | 44 | 49 | −5 | 42 | |
| 13 | Haidari | 34 | 12 | 6 | 16 | 37 | 43 | −6 | 42 | |
| 14 | Ethnikos Asteras | 34 | 11 | 8 | 15 | 29 | 38 | −9 | 41 | |
| 15 | Panserraikos | 34 | 10 | 9 | 15 | 41 | 46 | −5 | 39 | |
| 16 | Proodeftiki (R) | 34 | 9 | 9 | 16 | 20 | 38 | −18 | 36 | Relegation to Gamma Ethniki |
| 17 | Messiniakos (R) | 34 | 9 | 7 | 18 | 34 | 50 | −16 | 34 | Relegation to Gamma Ethniki |
| 18 | Niki Volos (R) | 34 | 8 | 8 | 18 | 23 | 44 | −21 | 32 | Relegation to Gamma Ethniki |

(C) Champions; (P) Promoted; (R) Relegated

== Results ==
| Home \ Away | AGR | AST | ETA | ETH | HAI | ILS | KAL | KLT | KAS | LEV | MES | NVL | PSE | PTH | PAS | PRO | THR | VER |
|---|---|---|---|---|---|---|---|---|---|---|---|---|---|---|---|---|---|---|
| Agrotikos Asteras | | 1–1 | 2–0 | 3–0 | 2–1 | 3–0 | 0–1 | 1–1 | 3–1 | 1–1 | 1–1 | 0–1 | 1–1 | 3–0 | 0–0 | 2–0 | 2–1 | 0–0 |
| Asteras Tripolis | 3–0 | | 2–0 | 2–0 | 2–0 | 2–0 | 3–1 | 2–1 | 1–2 | 2–2 | 1–0 | 2–0 | 2–1 | 1–0 | 1–0 | 1–1 | 6–1 | 2–0 |
| Ethnikos Asteras | 1–0 | 1–0 | | 0–0 | 1–0 | 1–2 | 1–1 | 1–0 | 4–2 | 1–1 | 1–0 | 0–0 | 2–0 | 2–0 | 1–1 | 0–0 | 0–2 | 0–2 |
| Ethnikos Piraeus | 1–0 | 0–1 | 2–0 | | 3–0 | 2–0 | 0–1 | 2–1 | 0–0 | 3–0 | 1–0 | 1–0 | 3–0 | 0–1 | 0–1 | 1–0 | 0–1 | 2–1 |
| Haidari | 0–1 | 2–2 | 2–2 | 3–1 | | 0–2 | 1–0 | 1–1 | 1–2 | 1–3 | 2–1 | 3–1 | 0–0 | 1–0 | 1–2 | 0–0 | 3–0 | 0–1 |
| Ilisiakos | 1–1 | 1–1 | 1–1 | 1–2 | 1–2 | | 3–2 | 1–1 | 3–4 | 1–0 | 2–1 | 1–0 | 1–1 | 2–0 | 4–2 | 1–0 | 0–1 | 2–0 |
| Kalamata | 1–1 | 1–2 | 2–0 | 1–1 | 2–0 | 0–0 | | 0–1 | 2–0 | 0–1 | 3–1 | 2–1 | 2–2 | 2–1 | 1–0 | 1–0 | 0–0 | 0–0 |
| Kallithea | 2–1 | 2–1 | 1–2 | 1–2 | 2–0 | 2–1 | 2–0 | | 1–2 | 2–0 | 1–0 | 4–0 | 1–2 | 1–0 | 0–0 | 3–1 | 2–0 | 1–2 |
| Kastoria | 2–1 | 1–2 | 3–1 | 1–0 | 2–2 | 3–1 | 2–0 | 4–1 | | 3–0 | 2–0 | 3–2 | 1–1 | 0–0 | 2–2 | 3–0 | 4–0 | 1–1 |
| Levadiakos | 3–1 | 1–0 | 1–0 | 3–0 | 2–1 | 2–1 | 2–1 | 3–1 | 0–0 | | 3–0 | 1–0 | 3–2 | 2–0 | 1–0 | 2–0 | 0–0 | 2–1 |
| Messiniakos | 3–0 | 1–2 | 0–1 | 1–3 | 0–1 | 3–2 | 1–1 | 2–4 | 1–0 | 1–2 | | 4–0 | 2–1 | 1–0 | 1–0 | 3–1 | 1–1 | 0–0 |
| Niki Volos | 1–2 | 1–1 | 2–1 | 1–1 | 2–0 | 1–1 | 0–0 | 1–0 | 3–0 | 1–0 | 0–0 | | 0–2 | 0–2 | 2–1 | 1–0 | 1–1 | 0–2 |
| Panserraikos | 4–0 | 0–3 | 0–1 | 1–0 | 2–1 | 0–0 | 1–1 | 1–1 | 0–1 | 3–1 | 0–2 | 2–0 | | 2–1 | 3–3 | 2–0 | 1–2 | 2–3 |
| Panthrakikos | 3–1 | 0–0 | 2–1 | 2–1 | 1–2 | 4–3 | 1–0 | 1–1 | 3–2 | 1–2 | 5–1 | 3–0 | 0–1 | | 1–1 | 0–0 | 4–1 | 2–0 |
| PAS Giannina | 3–0 | 2–1 | 3–1 | 2–1 | 1–0 | 3–3 | 3–0 | 4–1 | 0–0 | 0–1 | 4–0 | 0–0 | 2–1 | 1–1 | | 3–1 | 2–0 | 1–1 |
| Proodeftiki | 0–0 | 0–2 | 1–0 | 2–0 | 1–2 | 1–0 | 3–2 | 0–0 | 1–0 | 0–2 | 1–1 | 1–0 | 2–1 | 0–0 | 2–0 | | 1–0 | 0–0 |
| Thrasyvoulos | 0–1 | 2–2 | 1–0 | 1–0 | 0–3 | 0–2 | 2–4 | 1–1 | 1–0 | 2–1 | 4–1 | 2–1 | 1–0 | 4–0 | 1–1 | 2–0 | | 1–1 |
| Veria | 0–0 | 0–0 | 2–1 | 0–1 | 0–1 | 3–0 | 4–1 | 2–0 | 2–2 | 3–1 | 0–0 | 1–0 | 3–1 | 4–1 | 1–0 | 3–0 | 3–1 | |

Legend: Blue = home team win; Yellow = draw; Red = away team win.

== Top scorers ==
| Rank | Player | Club | Goals |
|---|---|---|---|
| 1 | (Greece) Ilias Solakis | Kastoria | 21 |
| 2 | (Greece) Georgios Saitiotis | PAS Giannina | 18 |
| 3 | (Greece) Ilias Kampas | Ilisiakos | 15 |
| 3 | (Greece) Ilias Ioannou | Asteras Tripolis | 15 |
| 5 | (Greece) Thanasis Gogas | Panserraikos | 12 |
| 5 | (Greece) Stathis Karamalikis | Ethnikos Piraeus/Levadiakos | 12 |
| 5 | (Greece) Vangelis Kaounos | Kalamata | 12 |
| 8 | (Poland) Bartosz Tarachulski | Veria | 11 |
| 8 | (Greece) Nikolaos Soultanidis | Agrotikos Asteras | 11 |
| 10 | (Greece) Ilias Anastasakos | Asteras Tripolis/Thrasyvoulos | 10 |
