= 2005 Greek Football Cup final =

2005 Greek Cup final
- Event: 2004–05 Greek Football Cup
Olympiacos	Aris
3	0
- Date: 21 May 2005
- Venue: Pampeloponnisiako Stadium, Patras
- Man of the Match: Rivaldo (Olympiacos)
- Referee: Giorgos Kasnaferis (Athens)
- Attendance: 15,550
- Weather: Partly Cloudy; 22 °C (72 °F); 60% humidity

The 2005 Greek Cup final was the 61st final of the Greek Cup. The match took place on 21 May 2005 at Pampeloponnisiako Stadium. The contesting teams were Olympiacos and Aris. It was Olympiacos' thirty- first Greek Cup final and second consecutive in their 80 years of existence and Aris' seventh Greek Cup final in their 91-year history. It was the first time that the match was held outside Athens or Thessaloniki Prefecture. It is characteristic that Aris had already been relegated to the second division during his presence in the final, with the result that the competitive and psychologically superior Olympiacos reached the conquest of the cup and consequently the double, while Dušan Bajević reached the 4th cup win as a coach. The following season, Aris, as a cup finalist played in the UEFA Cup thus becoming the first and only second division team in Greece that ever competed in any European competition.

== Venue ==
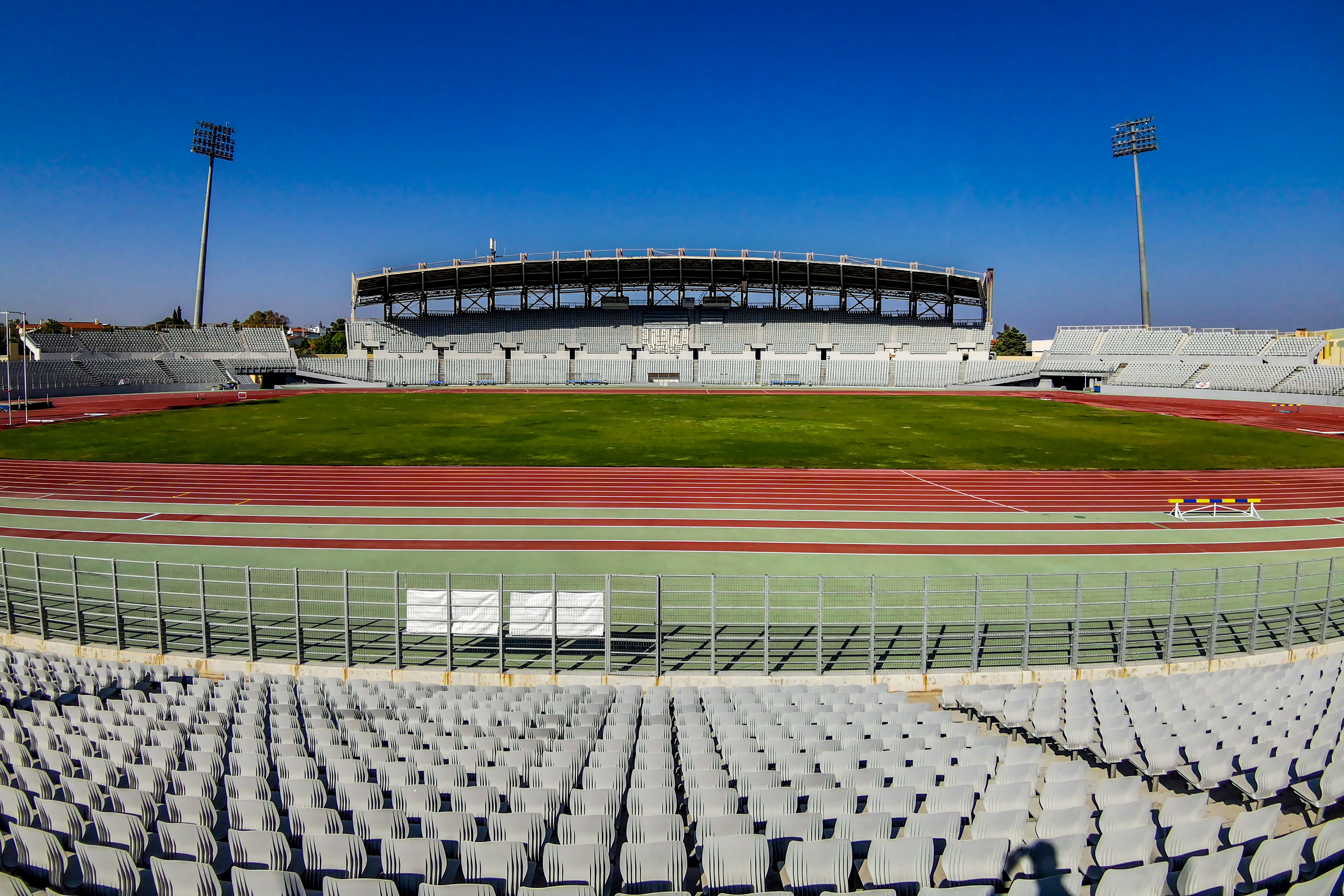
Pampeloponnisiako Stadium.

This was the first Greek Cup final held at Pampeloponnisiako Stadium.

Pampeloponnisiako Stadium was built in 1981 and was renovated once, in 2004. The stadium is used as a venue for Panachaiki. Its current capacity is 23,588.

== Background ==
Olympiacos had reached the Greek Cup final thirty times, winning twenty of them. The last time that they had won the Cup was in 1999 (2–0 against Panathinaikos). The last time that they had played in a final was in 2004, where they had lost to Panathinaikos by 3–1.

Aris had reached the Greek Cup final six times, winning one of them. The last time that they had won the Cup was in 1970 (1–0 against PAOK). The last time that they had played in a final was in 2003, where they had lost to PAOK by 1–0.

The two teams had never met each other in a Cup final.

== Route to the final ==
Olympiacos				Round	Aris			
Opponent	Agg.	1st leg	2nd leg		Opponent	Agg.	1st leg	2nd leg
Veria	5–1	0–0 (A)	5–1 (H)	First round	Kavala	5–3	1–2 (A)	4–1 (H)
Bye				Additional round	Bye			
Kallithea	3–3 (a)	1–0 (H)	2–3 (A)	Round of 32	Atromitos	8–0	5–0 (A)	3–0 (H)
Iraklis	2–1	0–1 (A)	2–0 (H)	Round of 16	Ethnikos Piraeus	4–2	2–1 (H)	2–1 (A)
Kastoria	6–3	1–2 (A)	5–1 (H)	Quarter-finals	Apollon Kalamarias	1–1 (a)	0–0 (H)	1–1 (A)
AEK Athens	3–1	1–0 (A)	2–1 (H)	Semi-finals	Skoda Xanthi	3–2	1–2 (H)	2–0 (A)

== Match ==
=== Details ===
21 May 2005
19:00 EEST

Olympiacos	3–0	Aris
Đorđević 56' (pen.), 90'; Rivaldo 70'	Report

Pampeloponnisiako Stadium, Patras
Attendance: 15,550
Referee: Giorgos Kasnaferis (Athens)

Olympiacos	Aris

GK	71	(Greece) Antonios Nikopolidis
RB	14	(Greece) Dimitrios Mavrogenidis	(substituted off) 51'
CB	32	(Greece) Georgios Anatolakis
CB	19	(Greece) Athanasios Kostoulas
LB	30	(Greece) Anastasios Pantos
DM	17	(Greece) Giannis Taralidis
CM	11	(Serbia and Montenegro) Predrag Đorđević (c)
RM	1	(Greece) Pantelis Kafes	(substituted off) 51'
LM	21	(Greece) Grigoris Georgatos
AM	5	(Brazil) Rivaldo
CF	9	(Cyprus) Ioannis Okkas	(substituted off) 84'
Substitutes:
GK	34	(Greece) Kleopas Giannou
DF	12	(Argentina) Gabriel Schürrer
DF	25	(Greece) Spyros Vallas
MF	6	(Greece) Ieroklis Stoltidis	(substituted on) 84'
MF	8	(Serbia and Montenegro) Miloš Marić
FW	7	(Mexico) Nery Castillo	(substituted on) 51'
FW	10	(Brazil) Giovanni	(substituted on) 51'
Manager:
(Bosnia and Herzegovina) Dušan Bajević

GK	15	(Greece) Vangelis Pourliotopoulos
RB	20	(Greece) Konstantinos Kallimanis	(substituted off) 87'
CB	4	(Greece) Avraam Papadopoulos
CB	23	(Greece) Georgios Koltsidas
CB	5	(Greece) Spyros Gogolos
LB	30	(Greece) Christos Naintos
DM	6	(Greece) Petros Passalis (c)
DM	2	(Poland) Maciej Murawski	(substituted off) 68'
RM	44	(Greece) Konstantinos Nebegleras	(substituted off) 66'
LM	40	(Cameroon) Dorge Kouemaha
CF	32	(Greece) Mimis Beniskos
Substitutes:
GK	31	(Greece) Sotiris Liberopoulos
DF	8	(Greece) Agapitos Abelas	(substituted on) 66'
DF	17	(Albania) Kristi Vangjeli
DF	25	(Greece) Dimitrios Markomichalis	(substituted on) 87'
MF	7	(Greece) Giannis Chrysafis
MF	22	(Argentina) Fernando Sanjurjo	(substituted on) 68'
FW	9	(Greece) Giannis Lazanas
Manager:
(Greece) Georgios Chatzaras

Man of the Match:
(Brazil) Rivaldo (Olympiacos)

Assistant referees:
Lykourgos Tsolakidis (Athens)
Giorgos Tabrantzis (Aetoloacarnania)

Match rules

- 90 minutes
- 30 minutes of extra time if necessary
- Penalty shootout if scores still level
- Seven named substitutes
- Maximum of three substitutions

== See also ==
- 2004–05 Greek Football Cup
