= 2004–05 Alpha Ethniki =

69th season of top-tier football league in Greece

Alpha Ethniki
- Season: 2004–05
- Dates: 18 September 2004 – 25 May 2005
- Champions: Olympiacos; 33rd Greek title
- Relegated: Aris; Ergotelis; Kerkyra
- Champions League: Olympiacos; Panathinaikos
- UEFA Cup: AEK Athens; Skoda Xanthi; PAOK; Aris
- Intertoto Cup: Egaleo
- Matches: 240
- Goals: 557 (2.32 per match)
- Top goalscorer: Theofanis Gekas (18 goals)

The 2004–05 Alpha Ethniki was the 69th season of the highest football league of Greece. The season began on 18 September 2004 and ended on 25 May 2005. Olympiacos won their 33rd Greek title.

== Teams ==
Promoted from 2003–04 Beta Ethniki	Relegated from 2003–04 Alpha Ethniki
Kerkyra; Apollon Kalamarias; Ergotelis	Akratitos; Paniliakos; Proodeftiki

=== Stadiums and personnel ===
Location of teams in 2004–05 Alpha Ethniki

Team	Manager^{1}	Location	Stadium	Capacity
AEK Athens	(Portugal) Fernando Santos	Athens (Marousi)	Athens Olympic Stadium	69,638
Apollon Kalamarias	(Serbia and Montenegro) Dragan Kokotović	Thessaloniki (Kalamaria)	Kalamaria Stadium	6,500
Aris	(Greece) Georgios Chatzaras	Thessaloniki (Charilaou)	Kleanthis Vikelidis Stadium	22,800
Chalkidona	(Greece) Georgios Paraschos	Athens (Peristeri)	Peristeri Stadium	9,035
Egaleo	(Romania) Ilie Dumitrescu	Athens (Aigaleo)	Stavros Mavrothalassitis Stadium	8,217
Ergotelis	(Greece) Manolis Patmetzis	Heraklion (Ammoudara)	Pankritio Stadium	26,400
Ionikos	(Greece) Vangelis Vlachos	Piraeus (Nikaia)	Neapoli Stadium	4,999
Iraklis	(Uruguay) Sergio Markarián	Thessaloniki (Triandria)	Kaftanzoglio Stadium	27,560
Kallithea	(Greece) Takis Lemonis	Athens (Kallithea)	Grigoris Lambrakis Stadium	4,250
Kerkyra	(Greece) Lakis Papaioannou	Corfu	Kerkyra Stadium	2,685
OFI	(Greece) Giannis Chatzinikolaou	Heraklion (Kaminia)	Theodoros Vardinogiannis Stadium	9,000
Olympiacos	(Bosnia and Herzegovina) Dušan Bajević	Piraeus (Neo Faliro)	Karaiskakis Stadium	33,334
Panathinaikos	(Italy) Alberto Malesani	Athens (Ampelokipoi)	Leoforos Alexandras Stadium	16,620
Panionios	(Greece) Dimitrios Barbalias	Athens (Nea Smyrni)	Nea Smyrni Stadium	11,756
PAOK	(Greece) Nikos Karageorgiou	Thessaloniki (Toumba)	Toumba Stadium	28,703
Skoda Xanthi	(Greece) Ioannis Matzourakis	Xanthi	Skoda Xanthi Arena	7,442

- ^{1} On final match day of the season, played on 25 May 2005.

== League table ==
Pos	Team	Pld	W	D	L	GF	GA	GD	Pts	Qualification or relegation
1	Olympiacos (Note: Olympiacos and Panionios originally had three points deducted for the incidents before their match in the round 16 but these deductions were cancelled on appeal.) (C)	30	19	8	3	54	18	+36	65	Qualification for Champions League group stage
2	Panathinaikos	30	19	7	4	51	18	+33	64	Qualification for Champions League third qualifying round
3	AEK Athens	30	17	11	2	46	22	+24	62	Qualification for UEFA Cup first round
4	Skoda Xanthi	30	14	8	8	43	29	+14	50	Qualification for UEFA Cup first round
5	PAOK	30	13	7	10	43	39	+4	46	Qualification for UEFA Cup first round
6	Egaleo	30	11	12	7	31	26	+5	45	Qualification for Intertoto Cup third round
7	Iraklis	30	12	5	13	36	30	+6	41	
8	Chalkidona (Note: Chalkidona were merged with Atromitos and therefore were replaced by them for the next season.)	30	10	8	12	34	38	−4	38	
9	Kallithea	30	9	10	11	39	44	−5	37	
10	Ionikos	30	8	12	10	22	32	−10	36	
11	Panionios	30	8	11	11	25	32	−7	35	
12	Apollon Kalamarias	30	8	9	13	31	49	−18	33	
13	OFI	30	8	8	14	36	44	−8	32	
14	Aris (Note: Aris had three points deducted for the incidents in the match against Iraklis in the matchday 29.) (R)	30	5	13	12	26	37	−11	25	UEFA Cup first round and relegation to Beta Ethniki (Note: Aris were qualified for the 2005–06 UEFA Cup as runners-up of the Greek Football Cup.)
15	Ergotelis (R)	30	5	5	20	19	50	−31	20	Relegation to Beta Ethniki
16	Kerkyra (R)	30	3	8	19	21	49	−28	17	Relegation to Beta Ethniki

Source: Galanis Sports Data
Rules for classification: 1st points; 2nd head-to-head points; 3rd head-to-head goal difference; 4th decision match.
(C) Champions; (R) Relegated

== Results ==
Home \ Away	AEK	APK	ARIS	CHA	EGA	ERG	ION	IRA	KLT	KER	OFI	OLY	PAO	PGSS	PAOK	XAN
AEK Athens		3–0	1–0	1–0	1–0	3–0	0–1	2–1	4–1	2–0	1–1	0–0	1–0	2–0	2–0	2–1
Apollon Kalamarias	2–1		0–1	0–2	1–1	1–0	1–1	1–3	1–2	3–0	1–0	0–2	0–1	3–3	2–1	1–1
Aris	1–1	0–0		1–2	0–0	1–1	0–2	0–2 (Note: The match between Aris and Iraklis was awarded to Iraklis after being suspended at 43rd minute (score: 1–2).)	2–2	2–0	3–2	0–1	1–1	1–0	1–3	2–1
Chalkidona	1–1	2–3	1–0		1–1	2–0	0–1	0–0	4–2	0–0	2–3	1–1	0–2	1–0	2–0	2–1
Egaleo	1–1	0–0	2–1	2–1		2–0	1–0	1–0	1–2	1–0	2–0	2–2	0–1	0–0	2–1	1–1
Ergotelis	0–1	4–1	1–1	1–1	2–1		2–3	0–1	1–1	1–1	0–1	2–1	1–3	0–3	0–1	0–2
Ionikos	2–3	2–0	2–1	0–0	1–1	1–0		1–0	0–0	0–0	0–0	0–4	0–0	0–0	1–1	1–1
Iraklis	1–2	2–3	0–0	1–0	2–2	2–0	2–0		5–1	5–1	1–0	0–1	0–4	0–1	1–0	1–1
Kallithea	1–2	1–1	3–1	3–1	1–0	3–0	0–0	2–1		1–2	3–1	1–1	0–2	1–1	1–1	2–3
Kerkyra	2–2	0–2	0–0	1–3	0–1	0–1	2–2	1–2	0–1		1–1	1–3	2–0	1–3	0–1	3–0
OFI	2–3	0–0	1–1	0–1	0–1	5–0	2–0	2–1	1–1	3–1		1–1	1–2	2–0	2–2	1–0
Olympiacos	1–1	2–0	2–1	3–0	3–1	2–0	2–1	1–0	2–1	3–0	3–0		1–0	3–0	5–1	0–0
Panathinaikos	0–0	5–1	0–0	6–3	0–0	1–0	3–0	0–0	1–0	1–0	5–1	1–0		4–0	2–1	3–1
Panionios	1–1	0–0	1–1	0–0	0–0	2–0	1–0	1–2	1–1	3–1	2–1	0–2	0–1		2–0	0–0
PAOK	1–1	5–2	2–2	2–1	2–4	0–2	3–0	1–0	3–1	1–0	4–1	1–1	1–1	1–0		1–0
Skoda Xanthi	1–1	4–1	3–1	2–0	2–0	3–0	2–0	1–0	1–0	1–1	2–1	2–1	3–1	3–0	0–2	

Source: Worldfootball.net
Legend: Blue = home team win; Yellow = draw; Red = away team win.

== Top scorers ==
Source: Galanis Sports Data

Rank	Player	Club	Goals
1	(Greece) Theofanis Gekas	Panathinaikos	18
2	(Brazil) Luciano	Skoda Xanthi	16
3	(Cyprus) Michalis Konstantinou	Panathinaikos	15
4	(Greece) Giorgos Barkoglou	Egaleo	14
4	(Greece) Dimitris Salpingidis	PAOK	14
6	(Greece) Nikos Machlas	OFI	13
7	(Brazil) Rivaldo	Olympiacos	12
8	(Nigeria) Patrick Ogunsoto	Ergotelis	11
8	(Brazil) Alessandro Soares	AEK Athens	11
10	(Greece) Giorgos Zacharopoulos	Chalkidona	10
10	(Greece) Kostas Katsouranis	AEK Athens	10
10	(Brazil) Giovanni	Olympiacos	10

== Awards ==
=== Annual awards ===
Annual awards were announced on 14 November 2005.

Award	Winner	Club
Greek Player of the Season	(Greece) Kostas Katsouranis	AEK Athens
Foreign Player of the Season	(Brazil) Luciano	Skoda Xanthi
Young Player of the Season	(Greece) Panagiotis Lagos	Iraklis
Goalkeeper of the Season	(Greece) Antonios Nikopolidis	Olympiacos
Golden Boot	(Greece) Theofanis Gekas	Panathinaikos
Manager of the Season	(Portugal) Fernando Santos	AEK Athens

== Attendances ==
AEK Athens drew the highest average home attendance in the 2004–05 Alpha Ethniki.

#	Team	Average attendance
1	AEK Athens	27,647
2	Olympiacos	20,367
3	Ergotelis	10,080
4	Panathinaikos	8,101
5	Aris	6,376
6	PAOK	5,702
7	Iraklis	4,524
8	Skoda Xanthi	2,858
9	OFI	2,400
10	Kerkyra	1,482
11	Apollon Kalamarias	1,386
12	Kallithea	1,177
13	Ionikos	1,103
14	Panionios	1,071
15	Chalkidona	989
16	Egaleo	894
