= 2005–06 Beta Ethniki =

Beta Ethniki
- Season: 2005–06
- Dates: 24 September 2005 – 14 May 2006
- Champions: Ergotelis
- Promoted: Ergotelis; Kerkyra; Aris
- Relegated: Olympiacos Volos; Panachaiki; Paniliakos

Beta Ethniki 2005–06 complete season.

== League table ==
Location of teams in 2005–06 Beta Ethniki

Pos	Team	Pld	W	D	L	GF	GA	GD	Pts	Promotion or relegation
1	Ergotelis (C, P)	30	16	8	6	41	23	+18	56	Promotion to Super League
2	Kerkyra (P)	30	17	5	8	38	26	+12	56	Promotion to Super League
3	Aris (P)	30	14	12	4	33	17	+16	54	Promotion to Super League
4	Thrasyvoulos	30	15	8	7	40	25	+15	53	
5	Veria	30	10	11	9	28	27	+1	41	
6	Kastoria	30	10	10	10	28	28	0	40	
7	Ilisiakos	30	11	7	12	43	35	+8	40	
8	Kalamata	30	9	12	9	26	28	−2	39	
9	Ethnikos Asteras	30	8	14	8	36	40	−4	38	
10	Niki Volos	30	9	11	10	32	31	+1	38	
11	Proodeftiki	30	9	11	10	31	34	−3	38	
12	Haidari	30	9	10	11	27	27	0	37	
13	Panserraikos	30	10	7	13	28	37	−9	37	
14	Olympiacos Volos (R)	30	10	7	13	30	37	−7	37	Relegation to Gamma Ethniki
15	Panachaiki (R)	30	9	7	14	24	29	−5	34	Relegation to Gamma Ethniki
16	Paniliakos (Note: Paniliakos had 1 point deducted.) (R)	30	2	4	24	16	57	−41	9	Relegation to Gamma Ethniki

(C) Champions; (P) Promoted; (R) Relegated

== Results ==
Home \ Away	ARI	ERG	ETA	HAI	ILS	KAL	KAS	KER	NVL	OLV	PCK	PNL	PSE	PRO	THR	VER
Aris		2–1	0–0	0–0	2–2	1–0	1–0	3–1	0–0	3–1	0–0	2–0	2–0	1–1	1–1	3–0
Ergotelis	1–0		4–1	2–0	2–1	0–0	2–0	0–0	1–0	2–0	1–0	3–0	2–0	0–0	4–0	0–0
Ethnikos Asteras	1–1	4–0		1–1	1–4	0–0	1–1	1–1	1–1	1–0	1–0	2–1	1–1	0–0	0–2	0–0
Haidari	1–2	0–2	1–1		1–1	3–1	1–1	1–2	0–0	3–1	0–0	2–0	2–0	0–0	2–0	0–1
Ilisiakos	0–1	3–2	2–2	2–1		3–1	0–0	0–2	4–1	2–0	2–0	2–1	1–1	1–2	1–1	0–1
Kalamata	0–0	3–3	1–2	2–0	1–0		1–0	0–2	0–0	1–1	0–0	2–0	0–0	0–1	1–0	1–1
Kastoria	0–0	0–1	2–2	2–1	2–1	0–2		1–0	2–1	0–1	1–1	3–0	2–0	3–0	2–2	0–0
Kerkyra	0–0	1–2	1–0	2–2	1–0	2–4	3–0		2–1	2–0	1–0	2–0	1–0	1–0	3–0	1–0
Niki Volos	2–1	1–1	1–3	1–0	2–1	0–0	3–1	1–2		2–0	1–1	5–2	0–1	2–1	1–1	2–0
ASK Olympiacos	2–1	1–1	3–1	1–0	3–1	0–0	1–0	0–2	2–1		3–1	2–0	1–1	2–2	0–0	2–0
Panachaiki	1–1	0–1	0–2	0–1	1–1	2–0	2–0	0–1	1–2	2–0		2–1	2–1	1–0	0–1	2–0
Paniliakos	0–1	2–0	0–2	0–1	0–1	0–1	2–3	1–1	0–0	1–1	0–2		0–1	1–2	0–2	2–1
Panserraikos	2–0	1–1	4–1	0–1	0–4	2–1	1–2	0–1	1–0	1–0	1–2	2–1		3–1	1–2	0–0
Proodeftiki	0–1	1–2	2–2	1–2	1–0	1–1	0–0	2–1	0–0	2–1	1–0	1–1	0–1		4–2	4–2
Thrasyvoulos	0–1	1–0	2–0	1–0	2–1	2–0	3–0	0–1	1–0	1–0	3–1	5–1	4–0	2–0		0–0
Veria	0–2	1–0	3–1	0–0	0–2	3–0	1–0	0–0	1–1	3–1	2–0	3–0	2–2	0–0	1–1	

Legend: Blue = home team win; Yellow = draw; Red = away team win.

== Top scorers ==
Rank	Player	Club	Goals
1	(Nigeria) Patrick Ogunsoto	Ergotelis	21
2	(Greece) Ilias Kampas	Ilisiakos	15
3	(Greece) Georgios Saitiotis	Niki Volos	13
4	(Greece) Thanasis Gogas	Panserraikos	13
5	(Serbia and Montenegro) Ljubiša Savić	ASK Olympiacos	11
5	(Algeria) Rafik Djebbour	Ethnikos Asteras	11
7	(Brazil) Leonardo	Thrasyvoulos	10
8	(Greece) Christos Mitsis	Ethnikos Asteras	9
8	(Greece) Georgios Lanaris	Veria	9
8	(Brazil) Ederson Fofonka	Kerkyra	9
