= Markos Dimos =

Greek footballer

Personal information
- Full name: Markos Christos Dimos
- Date of birth: 12 August 1972 (age 54)
- Place of birth: Düsseldorf, West Germany
- Height: 1.76 m (5 ft 9 in)
- Position: Midfielder

Senior career*
Years	Team	Apps	(Gls)
–1994	Akratitos		
1994–1999	Proodeftiki		
1999–2001	Akratitos		
2001–2005	Chalkidona		
2005–2006	Atromitos		
2006–2008	Thrasyvoulos		
2009	Ethnikos Piraeus		

Managerial career
- 2010: Ethnikos Piraeus
- 2011–2013: Atromitos (youth)
- 2013–2014: Ionikos
- 2014: Greece U17 (assistant)
- 2014–2015: Fokikos
- 2015: Ilisiakos
- 2015–2017: AEK Athens (youth)
- 2017: Triglia Rafina
- 2017–2018: Apollon Smyrnis (assistant)
- 2019–2020: Greece U15
- * Club domestic league appearances and goals

Markos Dimos (Greek: Μάρκος Δήμος; born 12 August 1972) is a Greek former professional footballer who played as a midfielder.
