= 2004–05 Beta Ethniki =

Beta Ethniki
- Season: 2004–05
- Dates: 19 September 2004 – 25 May 2005
- Champions: AEL
- Promoted: AEL; Levadiakos; Akratitos
- Relegated: Apollon Smyrnis; Atromitos; Poseidon Neon Poron
- Matches: 306
- Goals: 653 (2.13 per match)

Beta Ethniki 2004–05 complete season.

== League table ==
Location of teams in 2004–05 Beta Ethniki

Pos	Team	Pld	W	D	L	GF	GA	GD	Pts	Promotion or relegation
1	AEL (C, P)	30	17	7	6	44	17	+27	58	Promotion to Alpha Ethniki
2	Levadiakos (P)	30	15	11	4	30	14	+16	56	Promotion to Alpha Ethniki
3	Akratitos (Note: Akratitos are suspended for 30 days after they were found guilty of providing visiting teams water mixed up with chemicals last season.) (P)	30	16	8	6	33	19	+14	56	Promotion to Alpha Ethniki
4	Niki Volos	30	16	6	8	33	16	+17	54	
5	Olympiacos Volos (Note: Olympiacos Volos took the place of Kassandra.)	30	16	5	9	44	17	+27	53	
6	Panserraikos	30	15	8	7	33	21	+12	53	
7	Kastoria	30	13	12	5	44	21	+23	51	
8	Paniliakos	30	13	7	10	33	27	+6	46	
9	Kalamata	30	13	7	10	42	33	+9	46	
10	Proodeftiki	30	11	7	12	32	30	+2	40	
11	Ethnikos Asteras	30	11	6	13	26	27	−1	39	
12	Panachaiki (Note: Patraikos changed name to Panachaiki after round 1.)	30	10	7	13	31	34	−3	37	
13	Ilisiakos	30	9	9	12	43	41	+2	36	
14	Apollon Smyrnis (R)	30	9	6	15	25	49	−24	33	Relegation to Gamma Ethniki
15	Atromitos (Note: Atromitos was merged after the season with Chalkidona.) (P)	30	2	2	26	13	70	−57	8	Promotion to Alpha Ethniki
16	Poseidon Neon Poron (Note: Poseidon only have 8 players left; Kavala wanted to take over the team but the request to move the club to Kavala was rejected; they had 9 points deducted and were excluded after their third failure to play.) (R)	30	0	0	30	0	60	−60	−9	Relegation to Gamma Ethniki

(C) Champions; (P) Promoted; (R) Relegated

== Results ==
Home \ Away	AEL	AKR	APS	ATR	ETA	ILS	KAL	KAS	LEV	NVL	OLV	PCK	PNL	PSE	PRO
AEL		2–0	5–0	6–0	2–0	3–2	1–0	1–0	0–0	2–1	2–0	1–0	2–1	0–1	3–1
Akratitos	2–1		2–0	3–1	0–2 (Note: Match awarded due to the Akratitos's suspension.)	1–0	1–1	1–1	0–2	0–0	1–0	2–1	1–0	3–0	2–0
Apollon Smyrnis	2–1	0–0		2–1	0–1	1–1	0–1	0–2	0–0	1–0	1–3	1–0	2–2	1–0	2–1
Atromitos	0–1	0–1	0–1		1–3	1–4	0–1	0–1	0–3	0–2	0–3	0–4	0–0	0–1	0–1
Ethnikos Asteras	1–1	0–2	1–1	4–0		0–1	2–0	1–0	0–2	1–0	1–1	2–0	1–2	0–0	0–1
Ilisiakos	1–1	1–0	1–1	5–1	0–1		4–2	1–1	0–0	1–2	0–2	5–2	1–2	0–0	3–2
Kalamata	0–2	2–0	7–3	3–1	0–0	3–1		1–1	1–3	0–0	3–2	3–1	1–1	1–2	1–0
Kastoria	1–1	1–1	4–1	6–0	1–0	5–1	1–0		0–0	1–1	1–1	2–2	3–1	3–0	2–1
Levadiakos	1–1	0–0	1–0	2–1	1–0	1–1	0–0	2–0		1–0	1–0	0–1	0–0	2–0	1–0
Niki Volos	1–0	0–2	1–0	3–0	3–0	2–1	2–1	1–0	3–0		1–0	2–0	2–0	0–1	1–1
Olympiacos Volos	1–0	2–0	1–0	5–0	1–0	4–3	0–1	0–0	1–1	1–0		4–3	1–0	1–0	2–1
Panachaiki	0–1	1–1	2–0	1–1	1–0	0–0	0–3	0–1	0–0	0–0	1–0		0–1	3–1	1–0
Paniliakos	0–0	1–1	4–0	2–1	2–0	1–0	2–0	1–0	0–1	0–1	1–0	0–1		1–4	1–1
Panserraikos	1–0	0–1	3–1	1–0	3–0	1–1	1–1	1–1	3–0	0–0	0–0	2–1	1–0		2–0
Proodeftiki	0–0	0–1	4–0	1–0	1–1	1–0	2–1	1–1	2–1	2–0	1–0	1–1	2–3	0–0	

Legend: Blue = home team win; Yellow = draw; Red = away team win.

== Top scorers ==
Rank	Player	Club	Goals
1	(Greece) Ilias Kampas	Ilisiakos	18
2	(Greece) Georgios Saitiotis	Olympiacos Volos	14
2	(Greece) Ilias Manikas	Paniliakos	14
4	(Greece) Thomas Kyparissis	AEL	13
5	(Greece) Christos Kalantzis	Kalamata	12
5	(Greece) Nikos Soultanidis	Kastoria	12
7	(Greece) Lampros Chaniotis	Proodeftiki	11
8	(Croatia) Danijel Cesarec	Akratitos	10
9	(Serbia and Montenegro) Ljubiša Savić	Levadiakos	9
10	(Greece) Christos Athanasiadis	Kastoria	8
10	(Greece) Sokratis Boudouris	Olympiacos Volos	8
