= Lucas de Francesco =

Argentine footballer

Personal information
- Full name: Lucas Sebastian de Francesco
- Date of birth: 21 September 1981
- Place of birth: Pergamino, Argentina
- Height: 1.90 m (6 ft 3 in)
- Position: Striker

Team information
- Current team: Unión Mar del Plata

Senior career*
Years	Team	Apps	(Gls)
2003–2005	Kavala	44	(20)
2005–2006	Akratitos	27	(5)
2006–2008	Panetolikos	47	(18)
2008–2009	Ilioupoli F.C.		
2009–2012	Douglas Haig		
2012–2013	Jorge Wilstermann	30	(7)
2013–2014	Douglas Haig	24	(2)
2014–	Unión Mar del Plata	14	(1)
- * Club domestic league appearances and goals as of 8 April 2015

Lucas Sebastian de Francesco (born 21 September 1981) is a professional football striker currently playing for Unión Mar del Plata. De Francesco scored 12 goals for Kavala in the 2004–05 Greek Gamma Ethniki season.
