= Iordanis Pechlivanidis =

Greek footballer (born 1986)

Personal information
- Date of birth: 12 September 1986 (age 40)
- Place of birth: Shymkent, Kazakh SSR, USSR
- Height: 1.70 m (5 ft 7 in)
- Positions: Defender; left midfielder

Youth career
- 2001–2004: Skoda Xanthi

Senior career*
Years	Team	Apps	(Gls)
2004–2005	Skoda Xanthi	5	(1)
2005–2006	PAE Thraki	31	(3)
2006–2007	Kalamata	0	(0)
2007–2008	PAE Thraki	8	(1)
2007–2008	Olympiacos Volos	20	(1)
2008–2009	Aiolikos	14	(1)
2008–2010	Echinos	37	(16)
2010–2011	Anagennisi Giannitsa	32	(0)
2011–2012	Anagennisi Epanomi	25	(0)

International career
2006	Greece U-19	15	(0)
- * Club domestic league appearances and goals

Iordanis Pechlivanidis (Greek: Ιορδάνης Πεχλιβανίδης; born 12 September 1986) is a Greek footballer. He has played in the Greek Cup for Skoda Xanthi.

== Career ==
Pechlivanidis comes from a family with a football heritage. His career began at the age of 8 in a local team (Romeo football team, coached by his father Panagiotis Pechlivanidis). He was the team's first scorer. At age 10, he was called by Komotini's football youth academy. When he was 13 years old he received the fair play medal and the best player award, while playing for Komotini's youth academy. At age 14, he was called by Skoda Xanthi, a Greek team playing in the First League (Super League). By age 17, he was playing for Skoda Xanthi junior team as a left full back.

Meanwhile, he was called to join the National Junior and U21 football team. At his 18 he signed his first professional contract with Skoda Xanthi. His first match as a professional player was against Iraklis for the Greek championship. During the same season he played also against Kerkyra. The same year (2004) he participated in two matches as a Skoda Xanthi player in the National Cup, against Levadiakos (scoring one goal) and Atromitos.

Next year (2005) he was loaned to Thraki. During the 2005–06 season, he played for Kalamata F.C., while he was fulfilling his military obligations. In the first half of 2007-2008 he played for Thraki FC (Alexandroupoli) and in the second half he played for Olympiacos Volos. For the first half of te 2008–09 season, he played for Aiolikos and in the second half for Echinos Sport (Xanthi). In the 2009–10 season he played for the team Anagennisi Giannitsa In 2010, he joined Anagennisi Epanomi in Football League 2 (Greece).
