= Giu Vela =

Brazilian player football (born 1977)

Personal information
- Full name: Giuseppe Vela Júnior
- Date of birth: 28 September 1977 (age 49)
- Place of birth: Curitiba, Brazil
- Height: 1.78 m (5 ft 10 in)
- Position: Midfielder

Youth career
- 1989–1995: Coritiba Foot Ball Club – Blumenau Esporte Clube

Senior career*
Years	Team	Apps	(Gls)
1996–2000	Blumenau Esporte Clube	8	
2001–2003	Clube Atlético Metropolitano	6	(5)
2003–2005	Apollon Kalamarias	57	(5)
2005–2006	AEL	28	(2)
2006–2008	Apollon Kalamarias	41	(2)
2008	Veria	21	(0)
2009	Mogi Mirim		
2009–2011	Anagennisi Karditsa	38	(3)
2012	Fc. Qormi		
- * Club domestic league appearances and goals

Giuseppe Vela Júnior, better known as ‘’Giu Vela’’’ (born 28 September 1977), is a Brazilian football player who played professionally in the Super League Greece. Now official FIFA Agent Uefa, Fifa.

== Career ==
Vela began playing football in Brazil with Coritiba FC as a professional, he went to Blumenau Esporte Clube and Associação Ferroviária de Esportes. He moved to Greece in July 2003, initially joining Greek second division side Apollon Kalamarias on a two-year contract. Vela helped the club gain promotion to the Super League Greece in his first season, and he would appear in 57 league matches the following season. He signed with fellow Super League club AEL 28 league matches the following season, but immediately returned to Apollon Kalamarias, where he played for another two seasons 41 league matches in the Super League.

In August 2008, Vela joined Greek division side Veria F.C. on a six-month contract. At the end of 2008, ne moved back to Brazil to play for Mogi Mirim Esporte Clube A league Paulista.

In August 2009, Vela returned to Greece, joining second division side Anagennisi Karditsa on a one-year contract. He extended his stay for another year in August 2011. In 2012 he played in Malta Premier League Qormi. Now official Agent Intermediary Football players, Greek Federation Football.
