= Dimitrios Markomichalis =

Greek footballer

Personal information
- Full name: Dimitrios Markomichalis
- Date of birth: 27 December 1979 (age 46)
- Place of birth: Athens, Greece
- Height: 1.85 m (6 ft 1 in)
- Position: Midfielder

Senior career*
Years	Team	Apps	(Gls)
–2000	Pefki		
2000–2004	Ionikos		
2004–2005	Aris		
2005–2006	Niki Volos		
2007–2008	Ilisiakos		
2008–2009	Kallithea		
2009–2011	Elpidoforos		
2011–2014	Pefki		
- * Club domestic league appearances and goals

Dimitrios Markomichalis (Greek: Δημήτριος Μαρκομιχάλης; born 27 December 1979) is a retired Greek footballer who played as a midfielder.
