= Metodi Deyanov =

Bulgarian footballer

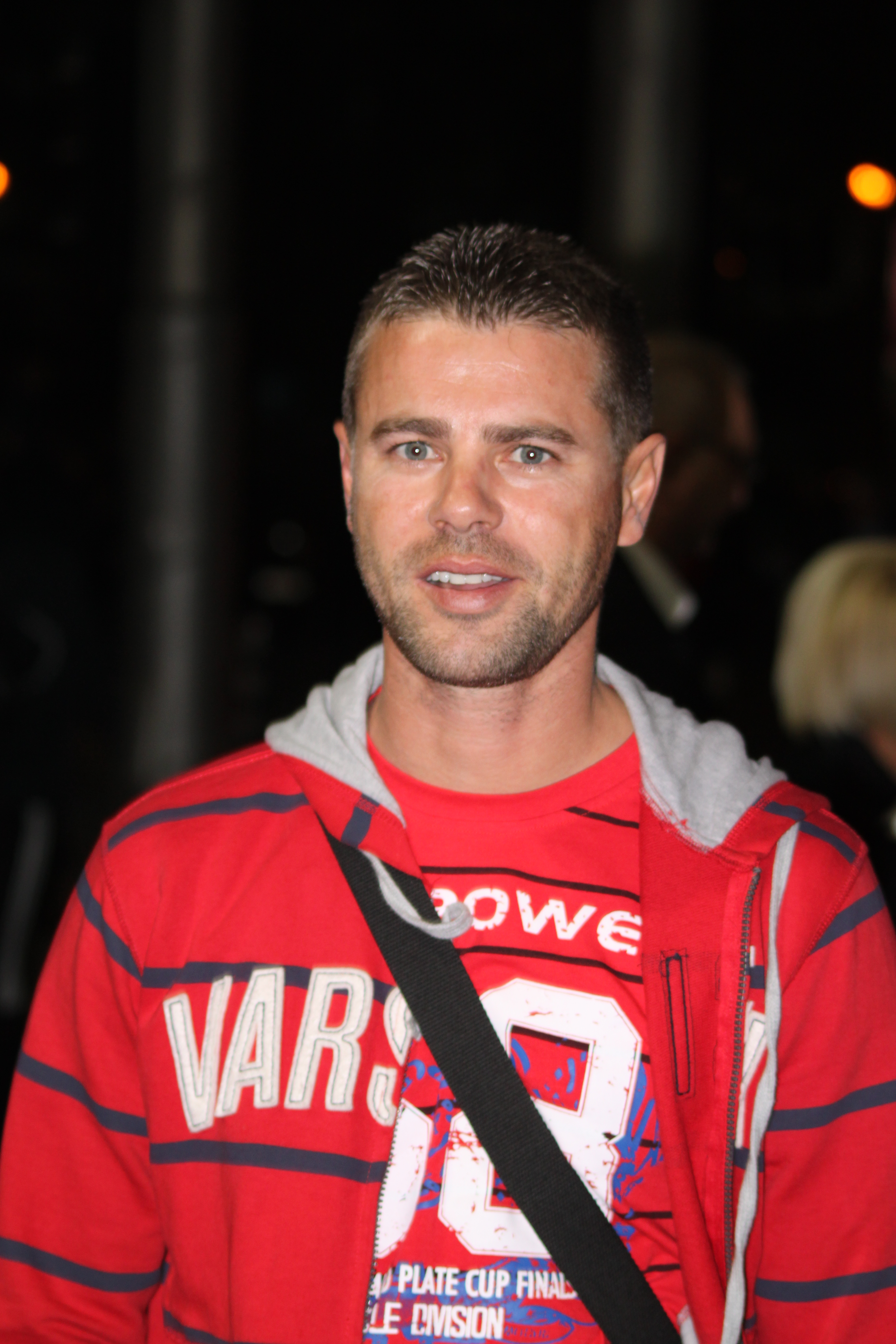

Personal information
- Full name: Metodi Valentinov Deyanov
- Date of birth: 3 April 1975 (age 51)
- Place of birth: Sofia, Bulgaria
- Height: 1.77 m (5 ft 10 in)
- Position: Attacking midfielder

Senior career*
Years	Team	Apps	(Gls)
1994–2002	CSKA Sofia	145	(24)
2002–2007	OFI	100	(20)
2007–2008	Anorthosis Famagusta	16	(3)
Total		261	(47)

Managerial career
- 2008–2011: CSKA Sofia (youth/scout)
- 2011–2014: Bulgaria U17
- 2015: CSKA Sofia (assistant coach)
- 2015–2016: CSKA Sofia U17
- * Club domestic league appearances and goals

Metodi Valentinov Deyanov) (Bulgarian: Методи Деянов) (born 3 April 1975 in Sofia), is a former Bulgarian football attacking midfielder. He ended his career at the end of 2007–08 season.

He made his debut for CSKA Sofia on 7 May 1994, in a home match against Shumen. The fans soon drew comparisons between Deyanov and club legend Dimitar Yakimov. Deyanov played several seasons in the Greek Super League for OFI. A highly talented player, his career was plagued by numerous injuries, the most serious of which he suffered in April 1998, keeping him out of action for close to a year.
