= Georgios Chatzaras =

Greek footballer and manager

Personal information
- Full name: Georgios Chatzaras
- Date of birth: 23 November 1953 (age 72)
- Place of birth: Thessaloniki, Greece

Managerial career
- Years: Team
- 1996–1998: Aetos Skydra
- 1998–1999: Veria
- 1999–2004: Egaleo
- 2004–2005: Aris
- 2005–2007: Egaleo
- 2007–2008: PAS Giannina
- 2008–2009: Ilisiakos
- 2010: Pierikos
- 2012: Pierikos
- 2013: Niki Volos
- 2013: Aiginiakos
- 2016–2017: Pydna Kitros

Georgios Chatzaras (Greek: Γεώργιος Χατζάρας; born 23 November 1953) is a Greek football manager.
