= Nikos Kalafatis =

Greek footballer

Personal information
- Full name: Nikolaos Kalafatis
- Date of birth: 15 March 1982 (age 44)
- Place of birth: Kastoria, Greece
- Height: 1.85 m (6 ft 1 in)
- Position: Defender

Team information
- Current team: Anagennisi Giannitsa

Senior career*
Years	Team	Apps	(Gls)
2002–2006	Kastoria	n/a (n/a)	
2006	Kalamata	n/a (n/a)	
2006–2007	A.E. Giannena	n/a (n/a)	
2007–2008	Aiolikos	28 (–)	
2008–2009	Korinthos	n/a (–)	
2009–2010	Kastoria		
2010	Anagennisi Giannitsa		
- * Club domestic league appearances and goals

Nikos Kalafatis (Greek: Νίκος Καλαφάτης, born 15 March 1982) is a Greek football player who played for Anagennisi Giannitsa F.C. in the Gamma Ethniki. He is the current coach of National Premier Leagues Victoria club Malvern City.
