= Rosen Kaptiev =

Bulgarian footballer

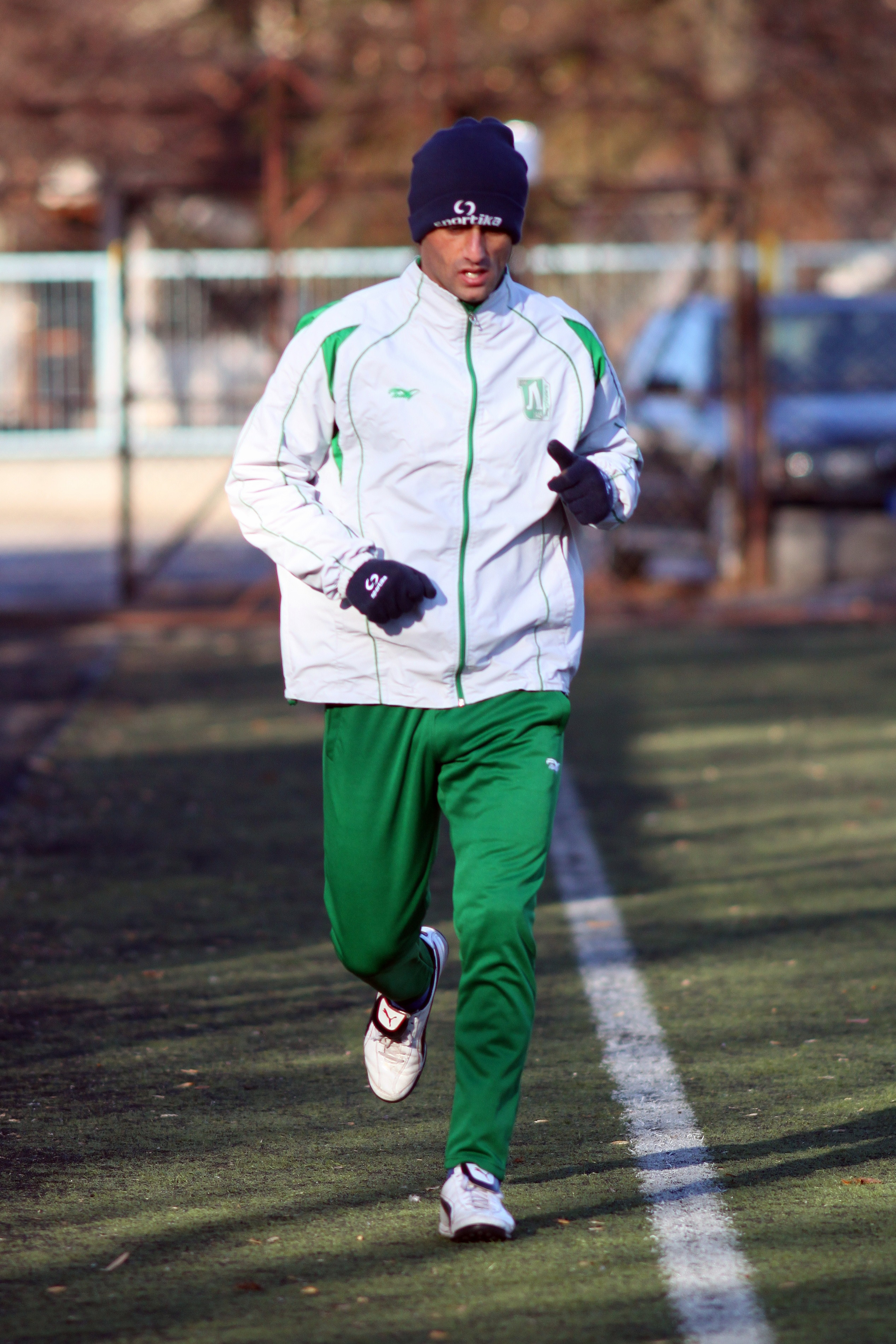

Personal information
- Full name: Rosen Nikolov Kaptiev
- Date of birth: 23 September 1979 (age 47)
- Place of birth: Satovcha, Bulgaria
- Height: 1.82 m (6 ft 0 in)
- Position: Forward

Senior career*
Years	Team	Apps	(Gls)
1998	Volov Shumen	2	(0)
1999	Parva Atomna	15	(6)
1999–2000	Lokomotiv Sofia	12	(3)
2000–2001	Pirin Blagoevgrad	26	(9)
2001	Rilski Sportist	9	(3)
2002–2004	Lokomotiv Sofia	76	(18)
2004–2005	Eordaikos	21	(9)
2005	Lamia		
2006	Vardar Skopje	15	(3)
2006	Minyor Pernik	10	(3)
2007	Spartak Varna	11	(3)
2007–2009	Dunav Ruse	54	(19)
2009	Anagennisi Epanomi		
2010	Dunav Ruse	11	(5)
2010	Ludogorets Razgrad	7	(1)
2011	Botev Kozloduy		
2012–2013	Dunav Ruse		
- * Club domestic league appearances and goals as of 1 July 2011

Rosen Kaptiev (Bulgarian: Росен Каптиев, born 23 September 1979) is a Bulgarian footballer currently playing for Dunav Ruse as a forward.

Kaptiev has previously played in the Bulgarian A PFG for PFC Lokomotiv Sofia and PFC Spartak Varna.
