= Konstantinos Kallimanis =

Greek footballer

Personal information
- Full name: Konstantinos Michail Kallimanis
- Date of birth: 13 February 1976 (age 50)
- Place of birth: Vasilikos, Greece
- Height: 1.76 m (5 ft 9 in)
- Position: Defender

Senior career*
Years	Team	Apps	(Gls)
1995–2000	Levadiakos		
2000–2003	Proodeftiki		
2003–2004	Xanthi		
2004–2005	Aris		
2005–2007	Levadiakos		
2007–2009	Panserraikos		
2009	Pierikos		
2010	Rodos		
2010–2011	Iraklis Psachna		
2011–2012	Chalkida		
- * Club domestic league appearances and goals

Konstantinos Kallimanis (Greek: Κωνσταντίνος Καλλιμάνης; born 13 February 1976) is a retired Greek football defender.
