= Anastasios Triantafyllou (footballer) =

Greek footballer (born 1979)

Personal information
- Date of birth: 11 January 1979 (age 47)
- Place of birth: Heraklion, Crete, Greece
- Height: 1.80 m (5 ft 11 in)
- Position: Striker

Senior career*
Years	Team	Apps	(Gls)
–2003	Atsaleniou	28	(18)
2003–2006	OFI	49	(7)
2006	Ionikos	14	(1)
2007	Ethnikos Asteras	15	(2)
2007–2011	Diagoras	77	(32)
2011–2012	AEL Kalloni	24	(5)
2012	AO Glyfada	11	(1)
2012–2013	Episkopi	19	(15)
2013	Iraklis Psachna	8	(1)
2014	Rouvas	12	(6)
2015	PAO Krousonas	21	(10)
2016	Atsaleniou	30	(28)
- * Club domestic league appearances and goals

Anastasios Triantafyllou (Greek: Αναστάσιος Τριανταφύλλου; born 11 January 1979) is a retired Greek football striker.
