= Formiga (footballer, born 1976) =

Brazilian footballer

Personal information
- Full name: Wander dos Santos Machado
- Date of birth: 25 April 1976 (age 50)
- Place of birth: Goiânia, Brazil
- Height: 1.76 m (5 ft 9 1/2 in)
- Position: Forward

Senior career*
Years	Team	Apps	(Gls)
1996	Goiás		
1997	Jataiense		
1997	Náutico	7	(7)
1999	Santa Cruz		
2000	Náutico		
2001	Caxias		
2002	Goiânia		
2002–2003	Shkumbini Peqin		
2003–2004	Atromitos		
2004–2005	Chalkidona	18	(0)
2005–2006	Partizani Tirana		
2006–2007	Olympiacos Volos		
2007–2008	Pierikos		
2007–2008	Pelister		
2008–2009	Korinthos		
- * Club domestic league appearances and goals

Wander dos Santos Machado, commonly known as Formiga, (born 25 April 1976) is a retired footballer who played as a forward for clubs in Brazil, Albania and Greece.

== Club career ==
Born in Goiânia, Formiga began playing football with Goiás Esporte Clube. He would play for Santa Cruz Futebol Clube, Clube Náutico Capibaribe and Sociedade Esportiva e Recreativa Caxias do Sul in the Copa do Brasil.

Formiga moved from Goiânia Esporte Clube to Albanian Superliga side KS Shkumbini Peqin in September 2002.

Formiga moved to Greece in July 2003, where he would play for Greek second division side Atromitos F.C. before moving to Greek first division side Chalkidona F.C. Formiga would also play in the second division for Pierikos and the third division for Olympiacos Volos and Korinthos F.C. In the season 2007-08 he also played with FK Pelister in the First Macedonian Football League.
