= Ilias Ioannou =

Greek footballer

Personal information
- Date of birth: 23 October 1979 (age 47)
- Place of birth: Athens, Greece
- Height: 1.80 m (5 ft 11 in)
- Position: Forward

Senior career*
Years	Team	Apps	(Gls)
1998–2003	Panionios	83	(12)
2003–2006	Kerkyra	70	(12)
2007–2008	Asteras Tripolis	39	(15)
2008–2009	Olympiacos Volos	25	(15)
2009–2010	Kavala	25	(3)
2010–2012	Kerkyra	46	(11)
2012–2013	Veria	26	(6)
2013	Panetolikos	7	(0)
2014	Olympiacos Volos	20	(2)
2015	A.O.T. Alimos F.C.		
2014–2015	Glyfada F.C.		
2016–	Ilisiakos F.C.		
- * Club domestic league appearances and goals as of 17:21, 15 December 2013 (UTC)

Ilias Ioannou (Greek: Ηλίας Ιωάννου; born 29 October 1979) is a Greek former professional footballer who played as a forward.

== Career ==
Ioannou began his playing career by signing with Panionios F.C. in July 1998.
