= Pyrgos Stadium =

Multi-purpose stadium in Pyrgos, Greece

Pyrgos Municipal Stadium "Charalambos Vilaetis"
- Interactive map of Pyrgos Municipal Stadium "Charalambos Vilaetis"
- Full name: Pyrgos Municipal Stadium
- Location: Pyrgos, Elis, Greece
- Coordinates: 37°40′44.6″N 21°25′41.6″E
- Operator: PAS Pyrgos F.C.
- Capacity: 6,750
- Surface: Grass

Construction
- Built: 1978

Tenants
- Paniliakos (1978-2024); PAS Pyrgos (2023-current)

Pyrgos Municipal Stadium "Charalambos Vilaetis" (Greek: Δημοτικό Στάδιο Πύργου "Χαράλαμπος Βιλαέτης") is a multi-use stadium in Pyrgos, Greece.

== Description and use ==
It is currently used mostly for football matches and is the home stadium of PAS Pyrgos 1968. The stadium holds 6,750 and was built in 1978.

The stadium's record attendance is 8,871 from a 1991 match. It was renovated in 2000 with plastic red and white seats added.
