= Thanasis Gogas =

Greek footballer

Personal information
- Full name: Athanasios Gogas
- Date of birth: 29 September 1980 (age 46)
- Place of birth: Hamburg, Germany
- Height: 1.91 m (6 ft 3 in)
- Position: Forward

Senior career*
Years	Team	Apps	(Gls)
1998–2000	Proodeftiki	4	(0)
2001–2002	Kavala	51	(13)
2003–2004	Kerkyra	25	(4)
2004–2007	Panserraikos	87	(31)
2007–2009	Ionikos	45	(9)
2009–2010	Anagennisi Karditsa	31	(4)
2010–2011	Ethnikos Asteras	10	(1)
2011	Elpidoforos	10	(4)
2011	Tilikratis	4	(1)
2012	Iraklis	3	(0)
2012–2013	Ethnikos Gazoros	23	(5)
2013	Asteras Magoula	7	(1)
2014–2015	Panserraikos	47	(18)
2015–2016	Rodos	19	(8)
2016–2017	Asteras Vlachiotis		
2017	Elpis Skoutari		
2017–2018	Megas Alexandros Karperi		
2018	Megas Alexandros Xiropotamos		
2018	Doxa Kato Kamila		
2018–2019	Doxa Lithotopos	9	(6)
2019–2021	KAE Agio Pnevma	22	(12)
2021–2022	AE Chryso	8	(5)
2022—2025	Iraklis Cheimarros	8	(3)
- * Club domestic league appearances and goals as of 1 July 2011

Thanasis Gogas (Greek: Θανάσης Γκόγκας; born 29 September 1980) is a Greek former footballer.

== Career ==
Born in Hamburg, Gogas moved to Greece where he began his playing career by signing with Proodeftiki F.C. in July 1998, and played two seasons for the club in the Alpha Ethniki. Gogas has not played in the top flight since, as he had stints with Kavala, Kerkyra, Pansseraikos and Ionikos in the Beta Ethniki and Anagennisi Karditsa F.C. in Delta Ethniki.

At the start of 2012 he signed for Iraklis but was later released as a free agent.
