= Nikos Soultanidis =

Greek footballer

Personal information
- Full name: Nikolaos Soultanidis
- Date of birth: 2 January 1977 (age 49)
- Place of birth: Komotini, Greece
- Height: 1.87 m (6 ft 1 1/2 in)
- Position: Forward

Senior career*
Years	Team	Apps	(Gls)
1998–2001	Kilkisiakos	78	(36)
2001–2003	Iraklis	2	(0)
2002	→ AO Chania (loan)	16	(4)
2002–2003	→ Kilkisiakos (loan)	37	(21)
2003–2006	Kastoria	87	(37)
2006–2008	Agrotikos Asteras	62	(23)
2008–2010	Kavala	33	(22)
2010–2012	Panthrakikos	50	(14)
2012–2014	Kilkisiakos		
- * Club domestic league appearances and goals as of 17 April 2012

Nikos Soultanidis (Greek: Νίκος Σουλτανίδης; born 2 January 1977) is a Greek former professional footballer who played as a forward.

== Career ==
Born in Komotini, Soultanidis began his professional career with Kilkisiakos F.C. before moving to Iraklis, Kastoria F.C., Agrotikos Asteras F.C. and Kavala In February 2005, Soultanidis scored two goals against Olympiacos in a 2–1 victory at the first leg, for the Greek Cup.
