= A.P.O. Akratitos Ano Liosia =

Greek football club

Akratitos
- Full name: Athlitikos Podosfairikos Omilos Akratitos Ano Liosia
- Founded: 1963; 63 years ago
- Ground: Yiannis Pathiakakis Stadium
- Capacity: 4,944
- Chairman: Nikos Zarkadakis
- Manager: Stavros Kyrlesis
- League: West Attica FCA Second Division
- 2025–26: West Attica FCA First Division, 14th (relegated)
Home colours	Away colours

A.P.O. Akratitos Ano Liosia (Greek: Α.Π.Ο. Ακράτητος Άνω Λιοσίων) is a Greek football professional club from Ano Liosia, Athens, Greece. They compete (in the 2026–27 season) in the West Attica FCA Second Division.

== History ==
Athlitikos Podosfairikos Omilos Akratitos Ano Liosia was founded in 1963 following the merger of "Panliosiakos" and "Proodeftiki Liosia", with Ioannis Pappas serving as the founder of the club. It immediately joined the Athens Football Clubs Association and during the 1969–70 season was promoted to the Athens FCA First Division for the first time in its history, just 7 years after its establishment. Fluctuations between the Athens FCA First Division and Second Division followed, with the club winning the Athens FCA Second Division championship twice during the 1979–80 and 1983–84 seasons.

Beginning with the 1984–85 season, a promising effort began for Akratitos to be promoted to the Delta Ethniki. After finishing in second place twice in the 1984–85 and 1985–86 championships, the team finally earned promotion in the 1986–87 season, when it won the Athens FCA First Division championship for the first time in its history and subsequently, following a playoff match against Aris Petroupolis, was crowned Athens Super-Champion. During the same period (1986–87), it reached the semi-final stage of the Athens FCA Cup also for the first time in its history.

The club competed in the Delta Ethniki division for 6 consecutive seasons (1987–1993), coming close to promotion during the 1987–88 and 1988–89 campaigns. During this period, the Ano Liosia Municipal Stadium, which serves as its home ground, was upgraded: natural turf was installed for the first time in the summer of 1991, followed by the installation of a canopy over the northern stand in the summer of 1994. In 1997, the team earned promotion back to the Delta Ethniki by winning the Athens FCA First Division championship for the second time in its history during the 1996–97 season, subsequently being crowned Athens Super-Champion for a second time as well, following a playoff match against Aittitos Spata. During the same period, it also reached the semi-finals of the Athens FCA Cup for the second time in its history.

Over the next two years (1997–1999), the club was organized along the standards of a professional team, once again renovating its home ground and strengthening the squad with experienced professional players, successfully winning a total of 3 titles during this two-year span. In the 1997–98 season, it won 2 cup titles by being crowned Athens FCA Cup winner for the first time in its history—defeating Acharnaikos in the final at the Nikos Goumas Stadium—and subsequently won the Greek Amateur Cup, also for the first time, by defeating Kilkisiakos at the Athens Olympic Stadium. In the following season, 1998–99, it won the championship of the 1st Group in the Delta Ethniki and achieved promotion to the Gamma Ethniki for the first time in its history, while during the same period it was also an Athens FCA Cup finalist.

In the professional divisions, the club achieved two consecutive promotions. During its inaugural appearance in the Gamma Ethniki division in the 1999–00 season, it won the championship and was promoted to the Beta Ethniki. In the very next season, it finished as runner-up in the Beta Ethniki during another debut campaign, earning a historic promotion to the top-tier Alpha Ethniki. The club remained in the Alpha Ethniki for three consecutive seasons (2001–2004), securing historic results against the powerhouses of Greek football: AEK Athens, Olympiacos, Panathinaikos, and PAOK. In its debut season in the Alpha Ethniki, it secured a 2–2 draw away against that season's champions, Olympiacos, at the OAKA Stadium, and a 0–0 draw against third-placed Panathinaikos in Ano Liosia. The team also made an impression with a 0–1 away victory against Aris at the Harilaou Stadium, comfortably securing its stay in the division. The following season, it recorded the biggest home victory in its history by defeating AEK Athens.

During the 2003–04 season, the team secured draws against the champions Panathinaikos in Ano Liosia (0–0), away against AEK (1–1), and at Toumba Stadium against PAOK (2–2); however, it was relegated to the Beta Ethniki following a playoff match against Beta Ethniki third-placed side Ergotelis at the Polichni Stadium. Worthy of mention during the 2001–2004 period when the club competed in the Alpha Ethniki are the successes of its youth development squad in the corresponding Alpha Ethniki youth championship, where it finished twice in the top four. Furthermore, in the summer of 2003, the club's youth team represented the senior squad in the 2003 UEFA Intertoto Cup against the Finnish side AC Allianssi, making respectable appearances.

The club made an immediate return to the Alpha Ethniki, gaining promotion as the third-placed team of the Beta Ethniki in the following 2004–05 season. However, the team's financial debts continued to accumulate, leading to Akratitos's last dance in professional divisions during the 2005–06 season, when it finished in last place in the Alpha Ethniki championship; nonetheless, during that same season, it reached the quarter-finals of the Greek Cup. Due to financial insolvency, the club's Board of Directors decided not to participate in the Beta Ethniki championship for the upcoming 2006–07 season, and subsequently, following a decision by the Hellenic Football Federation, the club was directly relegated to the Delta Ethniki, where it was barred from promotion for two years.

During the 2008–09 season, the club was relegated to the local championship of the West Attica Football Clubs Association, following a 12-year continuous presence in the national divisions. In the West Attica First Division over the decade that followed, it won two titles. Specifically, in the 2014–15 season, it won the West Attica First Division championship for the first time and subsequently participated in the special amateur promotion tournament, where it narrowly missed out on promotion to the Gamma Ethniki. In the 2018–19 season, it won the West Attica First Division championship for the second time and earned direct promotion to the newly restructured Gamma Ethniki (4th tier in the football pyramid), in which it competed for two seasons (2019–20 & 2020–21). In the 2020–21 season, with the Gamma Ethniki championship conducted in a single round of 11 matches, Akratitos finished in 9th place and was relegated to the local championships of the West Attica Football Clubs Association.

From the 2021–22 season to the present day, the club competes in the First Division of the West Attica Football Clubs Association, recording mediocre performances without being able to challenge for a return to the national divisions. In the 2023–24 season, it lost 2–1 in the association's Cup Final to Mandraikos, who had also won the league title. In the 2024–25 season, the team finished in fifth place in the championship with 58 points. During the 2025–26 season, although it registered to participate in the West Attica First Division, Akratitos was expelled by the organizing authority due to the lack of a home venue while also facing issues with the players' registration cards. The inactivity of the board members, who effectively left the team to its fate, led to its expulsion from the First Division.

== European matches ==
In July 2003 Akratitos took part in the Intertoto Cup. They played against Finnish team AC Allianssi for the second round, using their youth team, and were eliminated.

Season	Competition	Round	Club	Home	Away
2003	UEFA Intertoto Cup	2nd Round	(Finland) AC Allianssi	0–1	0–0

== Stadium ==
The team is using the Yannis Pathiakakis Stadium as their home ground. Until the death of Giannis Pathiakakis, it was known as Akratitos Stadium. It has a capacity of 4,944.

== Rivalries ==
One of the most competitive and eventful fixtures, carrying the distinct local derby character, is against Acharnaikos. The encounters of the 1990s in the Delta Ethniki championships stand out in particular.

== Honours ==
=== National ===
- Gamma Ethniki
  - Winners (1): 1999–00
- Delta Ethniki
  - Winners (1): 1998–99
- Greek Football Amateur Cup
  - Winners (1): 1997–98

=== Regional ===
- West Attica FCA First Division
  - Winners (2): 2014–15, 2018–19
- Athens FCA First Division
  - Winners (2): 1986–87, 1996–97
- Athens FCA Cup
  - Winners (1): 1997–98

== Notable former players ==
- (Argentina) Juan José Borrelli
- (Bulgaria) Martin Zafirov
- (Costa Rica) Froylan Ledezma
- (Costa Rica) William Sunsing
- (Costa Rica) Berny Peña
- (Egypt) Nader El-Sayed
- (France) Laurent Macquet
- (Greece) Christos Aravidis
- (Greece) Dimitrios Papadopoulos
- (Russia) Viacheslav Khorkin
- (Italy) Massimo Paganin
- (Italy) Paolo Vanoli
- (Peru) Roberto Merino
- (Romania) Bogdan Stelea
- (Romania) Lucian Marinescu
- (Romania) Erik Lincar
- (Serbia) Milan Obradović
