= Ilias Kampas =

Greek footballer

Personal information
- Date of birth: 13 February 1974 (age 52)
- Place of birth: Athens, Greece
- Height: 1.80 m (5 ft 11 in)
- Position: Forward

Senior career*
Years	Team	Apps	(Gls)
–1998	Paniliakos		
1998–2000	Athinaikos		
2000–2001	Asteras Zografou		
2001–2009	Ilisiakos		
2009	Atromitos		
2010–2011	Ilioupoli		
2011–2012	Glyfada		
2012–2013	Fostiras		
2013–2015	Ilisiakos		
- * Club domestic league appearances and goals

Ilias Kampas (Greek: Ηλίας Κάμπας; born 13 February 1974) is a Greek former professional footballer.
