= Ilisiakos F.C. =

Ilisiakos
- Full name: Athletic Club Ilisiakos
- Nicknames: Ήλυ; Κανάρια (Canaries)
- Founded: 1927; 99 years ago
- Ground: Municipal Stadium of Zografou
- Capacity: 2,716
- Chairman: Spyros Remoundos
- Manager: Giannis Silevistas
- League: Gamma Ethniki
- 2025–26: Gamma Ethniki (Group 6), 9th
- Website: Official website
Home colours	Away colours

Ilisiakos Football Club (Greek: Ηλυσιακός A.O.) is a Greek football club based in Ilisia neighbourhood of Zografou, a suburb of Athens, and was founded in 1927 by Michalis Xydis, Lambropoulos, Evgenopoulos, Nikolaos Plessas, et al.. Ilisiakos has registered 17 appearances in the Beta Ethniki division, though it has never managed to compete in the top-tier Super League. In the Greek Cup, the club has reached as far as the quarter-finals.

== History ==
Ilisiakos Athletic Club is a Greek multi-sports club based in Zografou, Athens. It was founded in 1927. The action of the football club "Ilisiakos" on an unofficial level—prior to the submission of its statutes to the Athens Court of First Instance—began at least from the previous year, according to contemporary press reports and other sources. The club holds Hellenic Football Federation registration number 15, being the 15th member registered with it.

The club's first department—and its only one for a period of time—was the football section, which originally joined the Third Division of the Athens Football Clubs Association, established just a year prior. During that era, Ilisiakos played at various grounds, including those of Panellinios, the Gymnastics Academy in Dafni, and Panathinaikos. The club's first success came in the following 1928–29 season, when it emerged as champion of the division. Subsequently, it competed in the Athens Second Division until winning the title in the 1932–33 season; however, it was not promoted to the First Division due to a reduction in the number of participating clubs to six. In the 1934–35 season, the club competed in the Athens First Division for the first time, facing the city's established powerhouses. However, a downward spiral followed, leading the club down to the Athens Third Division, where it played for several difficult years until winning the Athens Third Division title in 1943–44. During World War II, playing for the team proved lifesaving for its members, as the players were placed on the municipal payroll to ensure their survival. Promotion to the Athens Second Division in 1944 marked the beginning of a glorious decade. A notable manager for the club during this era was Johann Strnad from Austria (Greek champion in 1948–49 with Panathinaikos), who transformed the team into a competitive force.

In 1952, Ilisiakos relocated its activities to Kouponia, to a pitch at the foothills of Hymettus on Taxilou Street. In honor of the individual who granted the land, it was named the "Roufogalleio Gymnasium". Notably, during its construction, forgotten wartime shells exploded, injuring a group of children playing there who would future-proof themselves as club aces. This ground, inaugurated on 17 February 1952, hosted Ilisiakos until 1975.

In the 1952–53 season, Ilisiakos was crowned champion of the Athens Second Division. After a series of playoff matches against Atromitos, it was promoted to the Second Division (second in importance for the Athens region, as national divisions did not exist at the time). Following the establishment of the Beta Ethniki in 1960, this category was renamed the Athens First Division. In the 1959–60 season, Ilisiakos had captured the Athens First Division championship, but due to a restructuring of the divisions, it remained in the same category.

In the 1962–63 season, Ilisiakos was crowned Athens FCA First Division Champion and Athens FCA Cup winner, earning promotion to the Beta Ethniki. In the 1970–71 season, once again as Athens First Division Champion, it contested playoff matches but failed to secure promotion to the Beta Ethniki. It achieved this the following season (1972–73), having once more emerged as Athens FCA First Division Champion and Athens FCA Cup winner. This was followed by a decade of consecutive presence in the Beta Ethniki from the 1972–73 season through 1981–82. Notably, during the 1973–74 season, the team managed not to concede a single goal across its 17 home matches, while a match against PAS Giannina on 21 January 1974, set a Beta Ethniki attendance record that stands to this day, drawing 25,000 spectators inside the stadium (21,343 tickets sold) and approximately 6,000 more outside.

In 1975, the club relocated to the Grigoris Lamprakis Municipal Stadium in Zografou, where it has been based ever since. It competed for a series of years in the Beta Ethniki, though it never managed to gain promotion to the Alpha Ethniki—a fact that supporters often attribute to off-field factors. During the 1990s, the club experienced a downward trend, competing in the Gamma Ethniki and Delta Ethniki and eventually falling to the local regional championship, enduring one of the most severe crises in its history.

Ultimately, Ilisiakos managed to win the Athens FCA Championship twice (1998–99 and 2000–01), the Athens FCA Cup (2003), and the Delta Ethniki title, which brought the club back to Gamma Ethniki after a six-year absence. The 2002–03 season marked a turning point when Kostas Piladakis took over management of the club, appointing Georgios Donis as head coach. During this season, Ilisiakos captured the Delta Ethniki championship and earned promotion to Gamma Ethniki through play-off matches, while also winning the Athens FCA Cup in the same year.

In the 2003–04 season, the club finished in 3rd place—a promotional spot—and returned to the Beta Ethniki after winning a play-off match, notably utilizing various grounds across the Attica prefecture and Megaris as its home venue due to renovation works at its own stadium.

=== Merger and controversies (2008) ===
On 1 July 2008, the official website of Ilisiakos F.C. announced that majority shareholders Giorgos Christovasilis and Zacharias Markakis had agreed to transfer their controlling stake in the club to a new management team. Shortly thereafter, it was revealed that the new owner of the club was Thomas Mitropoulos, a prominent figure in Greek football who had previously faced allegations of exerting personal influence to control promotions and relegations across various divisions. Furthermore, Mitropoulos made known his intention to merge Ilisiakos with Egaleo—a club he presided over, which was then competing in the Gamma Ethniki.

This decision sparked fierce backlash among supporters and football authorities, driven both by the new owner's controversial past and by the historical distinctiveness of the two clubs, which lacked any geographical or historical connections. The former owners of Ilisiakos publicly declared that they had been deceived by Mitropoulos. In September 2008, Members of Parliament Thanos Plevris, Giannis Dimaras, and Liana Kanelli brought the controversial takeover and merger issue before the Hellenic Parliament.

As a result of the potential joint path of the two clubs under any legal form, Egaleo would compete in the Beta Ethniki in Ilisiakos' place. On the formal side, legislation prohibits a president from heading two clubs, and a merger cannot take place without a formal decision by the two amateur clubs. Consequently, sports journalists from various newspapers criticized the political authorities' indifference toward the issue and the amorality highlighted by the case. During the first matches of the season, the club played in kits of a different color that bore no crest whatsoever, with supporters either consciously boycotting matches or, in some cases, being barred from entering the stadium to prevent incidents. On 8 October 2008, the General Secretariat for Sports issued an announcement stating that up to that date no application for approval of a merger between the two clubs had been submitted to the authority. On 25 June 2009, through an official announcement, the Hellenic Football Federation banned club mergers intended to facilitate the fulfillment of sporting criteria or to acquire a participation license for a championship. Contrary to these developments, however, on Sunday, 9 August 2009, the Professional Sports Committee (EEA) convened on a Sunday—voting 5–3 to approve the absorption of Ilisiakos F.C. by Egaleo F.C., with the resulting hybrid club receiving the name A.O. Ilisiakos (of) Egaleo.

=== Later years ===
In July 2020, following the club's relegation to local regional divisions, a salvation committee for the football department was formed with the goal of returning to the national divisions. In the 2022–23 season, Ilisiakos secured 1st place in Group 3 of the Athens FCA League and subsequently emerged as the overall champion (super-champion) of the Athens Football Clubs Association. In the special promotion playoff tournament featuring the champion teams of the regional associations, Ilisiakos also finished in 1st place, thereby securing the top promotional spot leading to the Gamma Ethniki with 3 consecutive first-place finishes across 3 different championships. The following season (2023–24) in the Gamma Ethniki, placed in a group alongside historic clubs, the team achieved its goal of quick survival, finishing within the top five positions of the standings. In the 2024–25 season, although it appeared during the first half to be a contender for promotion, the team ultimately collapsed in the second half of the season and secured its survival in the final matchdays.

== Crest and colours ==
Previous crest

The club's logo depicts the capital letter Eta (H) of the Greek alphabet, and its colours are yellow and black.

== Honours ==
=== National ===
  - Delta Ethniki: 1
    - 2002–03

=== Regional ===
  - Athens FCA Champions: 6
    - 1962–63, 1970–71, 1971–72, 1998–99, 2000–01, 2022–23
  - Athens FCA Cup: 2
    - 2002–03, 2018–19
