= 2004–05 Olympiacos F.C. season =

Olympiacos
2004–05 season
- Chairman: Sokratis Kokkalis
- Manager: Dušan Bajević
- Stadium: Karaiskakis Stadium, Piraeus
- Alpha Ethniki: 1st
- Greek Cup: Winners
- Champions League: Group stage
- UEFA Cup: Round of 16
- Top goalscorer: League: Rivaldo (12); All: Rivaldo (15)
- Highest home attendance: 30,500 vs Sochaux (1 November 2005)
| Home colours | Away colours |

The 2004–05 season was Olympiacos's 46th consecutive season in the Alpha Ethniki and their 79th year in existence. The club were played their 8th consecutive season in the UEFA Champions League. In the beginning of the summertime Olympiacos named Norwegian Trond Sollied coach.

== Players ==
=== First-team squad ===
Squad at end of season

Note: Flags indicate national team as defined under FIFA eligibility rules; some limited exceptions apply. Players may hold more than one non-FIFA nationality.

| No. | Pos. | Nation | Player |
|---|---|---|---|
| 1 | MF | GRE | Pantelis Kafes |
| 2 | MF | GRE | Christos Patsatzoglou |
| 3 | DF | GRE | Stelios Venetidis |
| 4 | DF | GRE | Efthimios Koulouheris |
| 5 | FW | BRA | Rivaldo |
| 6 | MF | GRE | Ieroklis Stoltidis |
| 7 | FW | MEX | Nery Castillo |
| 8 | MF | SCG | Miloš Marić |
| 9 | FW | CYP | Ioannis Okkas |
| 10 | FW | BRA | Giovanni |
| 11 | MF | SCG | Predrag Đorđević |
| 12 | DF | ARG | Gabriel Schurrer |
| 13 | MF | CRO | Ivan Režić |
| 14 | DF | GRE | Dimitris Mavrogennidis |
| 16 | GK | SVK | Juraj Buček |

| No. | Pos. | Nation | Player |
|---|---|---|---|
| 17 | MF | GRE | Giannis Taralidis |
| 18 | FW | BRA | Alexandre D'Acol |
| 19 | DF | GRE | Athanasios Kostoulas |
| 20 | MF | GRE | Konstantinos Mendrinos |
| 21 | DF | GRE | Grigorios Georgatos |
| 25 | DF | GRE | Spyros Vallas |
| 27 | MF | USA | Peter Philipakos |
| 28 | MF | ARM | Zhora Hovhannisyan |
| 29 | GK | GRE | Konstantinos Ntougeroglou |
| 30 | DF | GRE | Anastasios Pantos |
| 31 | FW | GRE | Georgios Georgiadis |
| 32 | DF | GRE | Georgios Anatolakis |
| 34 | GK | GRE | Kleopas Giannou |
| 71 | GK | GRE | Antonios Nikopolidis |
| 77 | MF | GRE | Antonis Vlachos |

== Competitions ==
=== Alpha Ethniki ===
==== League table ====
| Pos | Team | Pld | W | D | L | GF | GA | GD | Pts | Qualification or relegation |
|---|---|---|---|---|---|---|---|---|---|---|
| 1 | Olympiacos (Note: Olympiacos and Panionios originally had three points deducted for the incidents before their match in the round 16 but these deductions were cancelled on appeal.) (C) | 30 | 19 | 8 | 3 | 54 | 18 | +36 | 65 | Qualification for Champions League group stage |
| 2 | Panathinaikos | 30 | 19 | 7 | 4 | 51 | 18 | +33 | 64 | Qualification for Champions League third qualifying round |
| 3 | AEK Athens | 30 | 17 | 11 | 2 | 46 | 22 | +24 | 62 | Qualification for UEFA Cup first round |
| 4 | Skoda Xanthi | 30 | 14 | 8 | 8 | 43 | 29 | +14 | 50 | Qualification for UEFA Cup first round |
| 5 | PAOK | 30 | 13 | 7 | 10 | 43 | 39 | +4 | 46 | Qualification for UEFA Cup first round |

Source: Galanis Sports Data
Rules for classification: 1st points; 2nd head-to-head points; 3rd head-to-head goal difference; 4th decision match.
(C) Champions

==== Results summary ====
| Overall | | | | | | | | Home | | | | | | Away | | | | | |
| Pld | W | D | L | GF | GA | GD | Pts | W | D | L | GF | GA | GD | W | D | L | GF | GA | GD |
|---|---|---|---|---|---|---|---|---|---|---|---|---|---|---|---|---|---|---|---|
| 30 | 19 | 8 | 3 | 54 | 18 | +36 | 65 | 13 | 2 | 0 | 33 | 6 | +27 | 6 | 6 | 3 | 21 | 12 | +9 |

Last updated: 25 May 2005.
Source: Competitive matches

==== Results by round ====
| Round | 1 | 2 | 3 | 4 | 5 | 6 | 7 | 8 | 9 | 10 | 11 | 12 | 13 | 14 | 15 | 16 | 17 | 18 | 19 | 20 | 21 | 22 | 23 | 24 | 25 | 26 | 27 | 28 | 29 | 30 |
|---|---|---|---|---|---|---|---|---|---|---|---|---|---|---|---|---|---|---|---|---|---|---|---|---|---|---|---|---|---|---|
| Ground | H | A | A | H | A | H | A | H | A | H | H | A | H | A | H | A | H | H | A | H | A | H | A | H | A | A | H | A | H | A |
| Result | W | W | L | W | D | W | D | W | W | W | W | D | W | W | W | D | W | D | L | W | D | D | D | W | L | W | W | W | W | W |
| Position | 3 | 2 | 6 | 4 | 5 | 3 | 3 | 3 | 2 | 1 | 1 | 1 | 1 | 1 | 1 | 1 | 1 | 1 | 1 | 1 | 1 | 1 | 3 | 1 | 3 | 3 | 3 | 2 | 1 | 1 |

Source: Competitive matches
A = Away; H = Home; W = Win; D = Draw; L = Loss

==== Matches ====
All times at EET

| 19 September 2004 1 | Olympiacos | 2–1 | Kallithea | Piraeus |
| 21:15 | Okkas 17'; Anatolakis 49' | | Gekas 36' | Stadium: Karaiskakis Stadium; Attendance: 30,043; Referee: Georgios Kasnaferis |

| 25 September 2004 2 | Aris | 0–1 | Olympiacos | Thessaloniki |
| 18:00 | | | Giovanni 59' | Stadium: Kleanthis Vikelidis Stadium; Attendance: 11,355; Referee: Dimitrios Takidis |

| 3 October 2004 3 | Skoda Xanthi | 2–1 | Olympiacos | Xanthi |
| 18:00 | Zapropoulos 49'; Labriakos 73' | | Georgiadis 18' | Stadium: Skoda Xanthi Arena; Attendance: 5,947; Referee: Athanasios Briakos |

| 16 October 2004 4 | Olympiacos | 2–0 | Ergotelis | Piraeus |
| 18:00 | Georgiadis 40'; Anatolakis 68' | | | Stadium: Karaiskakis Stadium; Attendance: 26,141; Referee: Anastasios Kakos |

| 24 October 2004 5 | Chalkidona | 1–1 | Olympiacos | Piraeus |
| 17:30 | Dimos 71' | | Dagas 73' (o.g.) | Stadium: Neapoli Stadium; Attendance: 3,522; Referee: Giannis Tsachilidis |

| 30 October 2004 6 | Olympiacos | 5–1 | PAOK | Piraeus |
| 17:30 | Giovanni 7'; Rivaldo 13', 26'; Đorđević 45'; Castillo 90+1' | | Salpingidis 65' | Stadium: Karaiskakis Stadium; Attendance: 26,972; Referee: Giannis Kaminaris |

| 7 November 2004 7 | AEK Athens | 0–0 | Olympiacos | Athens |
| 19:30 | | | | Stadium: Olympic Stadium; Attendance: 63,129; Referee: Giorgos Douros |

| 20 November 2004 8 | Olympiacos | 3–0 | OFI | Piraeus |
| 17:45 | Giovanni 45', 51'; Rivaldo 78' | | | Stadium: Karaiskakis Stadium; Attendance: 25,316; Referee: Dimitrios Dabosis |

| 28 November 2004 9 | Ionikos | 0–4 | Olympiacos | Piraeus |
| 17:00 | | | Giovanni 6', 43', 90'; Đorđević 23' | Stadium: Neapoli Stadium; Attendance: 2,760; Referee: Dimitrios Takidis |

| 4 December 2004 10 | Olympiacos | 1–0 | Panathinaikos | Piraeus |
| 19:00 | Rivaldo 30' | | | Stadium: Karaiskakis Stadium; Attendance: 30,856; Referee: Georgios Kasnaferis |

| 12 December 2004 11 | Olympiacos | 2–0 | Apollon Kalamarias | Piraeus |
| 17:45 | Castillo 45'; Georgatos 90' | | | Stadium: Karaiskakis Stadium; Attendance: 24,053; Referee: Christoforos Zografos |

| 19 December 2004 12 | Egaleo | 2–2 | Olympiacos | Athens |
| 17:00 | Barkoglou 68'; Agritis 83' | | Rivaldo 38', 57' | Stadium: Stavros Mavrothalassitis Stadium; Attendance: 1,924; Referee: Dimitrios Kalopoulos |

| 29 December 2004 13 | Olympiacos | 3–0 | Kerkyra | Piraeus |
| 19:00 | Amanatidis 14' (o.g.); Georgatos 29'; Giovanni 58' | | | Stadium: Karaiskakis Stadium; Attendance: 29,059; Referee: Ioakim Efthymiadis |

| 16 January 2005 15 | Olympiacos | 1–0 | Iraklis | Piraeus |
| 19:00 | Đorđević 60' (pen.) | | | Stadium: Karaiskakis Stadium; Attendance: 23,137; Referee: Konstantinos Finokaliotis |

| 23 January 2005 16 | Kallithea | 1–1 | Olympiacos | Athens |
| 19:00 | Gekas 53' (pen.) | | Tzorbatzakis 40' (o.g.) | Stadium: Grigoris Lambrakis Stadium; Attendance: 1,901; Referee: Dimitrios Takidis |

| 30 January 2005 17 | Olympiacos | 2–1 | Aris | Piraeus |
| 19:00 | Okkas 3'; Georgiadis 60' | | Abelas 5' | Stadium: Karaiskakis Stadium; Attendance: 0 (closed doors); Referee: Christoforos Zografos |

| 5 February 2005 14 | Panionios | 0–2 | Olympiacos | Athens |
| 19:00 | | | Rivaldo 50'; Kafes 64' | Stadium: Nea Smyrni Stadium; Attendance: 0 (closed doors); Referee: Gerasimos Mazarakis |

| 12 February 2005 18 | Olympiacos | 0–0 | Skoda Xanthi | Piraeus |
| 17:45 | | | | Stadium: Karaiskakis Stadium; Attendance: 0 (closed doors); Referee: Anastasios Kakos |

| 20 February 2005 19 | Ergotelis | 2–1 | Olympiacos | Heraklion |
| 16:30 | Addo 3'; Ogunsoto 90+1' | | Rivaldo 21' (pen.) | Stadium: Pankritio Stadium; Attendance: 27,950; Referee: Avraam Kemparidis |

| 27 February 2005 20 | Olympiacos | 3–0 | Chalkidona | Piraeus |
| 19:00 | Stoltidis 6', 11'; Anatolakis 46' | | | Stadium: Karaiskakis Stadium; Attendance: 0 (closed doors); Referee: Dimitrios Styliaras |

| 6 March 2005 21 | PAOK | 1–1 | Olympiacos | Thessaloniki |
| 18:15 | Salpingidis 47' | | Đorđević 21' (pen.) | Stadium: Toumba Stadium; Attendance: 23,950; Referee: Christoforos Zografos |

| 13 March 2005 22 | Olympiacos | 1–1 | AEK Athens | Piraeus |
| 20:00 | Okkas 19' | | Katsouranis 71' (pen.) | Stadium: Karaiskakis Stadium; Attendance: 0 (closed doors); Referee: Giorgos Kasnaferis |

| 20 March 2005 23 | OFI | 1–1 | Olympiacos | Heraklion |
| 18:15 | Deyanov 81' | | Giovanni 72' | Stadium: Theodoros Vardinogiannis Stadium; Attendance: 4,909; Referee: Giannis Kaminaris |

| 3 April 2005 24 | Olympiacos | 2–1 | Ionikos | Piraeus |
| 20:00 | Castillo 49'; Đorđević 50' | | Gutman 22' | Stadium: Karaiskakis Stadium; Attendance: 28,958; Referee: Ilias Mazarakos |

| 10 April 2005 25 | Panathinaikos | 1–0 | Olympiacos | Athens |
| 21:00 | Konstantinou 44' | | | Stadium: Leoforos Alexandras Stadium; Attendance: 14,860; Referee: Athanasios Briakos |

| 17 April 2005 26 | Apollon Kalamarias | 0–2 | Olympiacos | Thessaloniki |
| 19:00 | | | Castillo 64'; Rivaldo 89' | Stadium: Kalamaria Stadium; Attendance: 2,866; Referee: Georgios Kasnaferis |

| 24 April 2005 27 | Olympiacos | 3–1 | Egaleo | Piraeus |
| 20:00 | Rivaldo 25', 48'; Giovanni 80' | | Psomas 61' | Stadium: Karaiskakis Stadium; Attendance: 29,894; Referee: Dimitrios Dabosis |

| 8 May 2005 28 | Kerkyra | 1–3 | Olympiacos | Corfu |
| 19:00 | Fofonka 44' | | Castillo 25'; Georgatos 42'; Okkas 69' | Stadium: Kerkyra Stadium; Attendance: 1,953; Referee: Michalis Germanakos |

| 15 May 2005 29 | Olympiacos | 3–0 | Panionios | Piraeus |
| 18:45 | Kafes 56'; Okkas 66'; Castillo 71' | | | Stadium: Karaiskakis Stadium; Attendance: 31,081; Referee: Iraklis Tsikinis |

| 25 May 2005 30 | Iraklis | 0–1 | Olympiacos | Thessaloniki |
| 18:30 | | | Rivaldo 62' | Stadium: Kaftanzoglio Stadium; Attendance: 15,700; Referee: Vasilios Terovitsas |

=== Greek Cup ===
==== First round ====
| 6 October 2004 First leg | Veria | 0–0 | Olympiacos | Veria |
| 13:00 EEST | | Report | | Stadium: Veria Stadium; Referee: Dimitris Kalopoulos (Thessaloniki) |

| 10 October 2004 Second leg | Olympiacos | 5–1 (5–1 agg.) | Veria | Piraeus |
| 13:00 EEST | Giovanni 31', 45+2'; Taralidis 59'; Castillo 73', 85' | Report | Lafazanidis 27' | Stadium: Karaiskakis Stadium; Attendance: 23,101; Referee: Christoforos Zografos (Athens) |

==== Round of 32 ====
| 22 December 2004 First leg | Olympiacos | 1–0 | Kallithea | Piraeus |
| 19:00 EET | Castillo 3' | Report | | Stadium: Karaiskakis Stadium; Referee: Anastasios Kakos (Corfu) |

| 12 January 2005 Second leg | Kallithea | 3–2 (3–3(a) agg.) | Olympiacos | Kallithea |
| 19:00 EET | Tsigas 38'; Kyriakos 61'; Gekas 65' | Report | Kafes 58'; Okkas 69' | Stadium: Grigoris Lambrakis Stadium; Attendance: 1,352; Referee: Giorgos Takidis (Kilkis) |

==== Round of 16 ====
| 19 January 2005 First leg | Iraklis | 1–0 | Olympiacos | Thessaloniki |
| 19:00 EET | Kapetanos 2' | Report | | Stadium: Kaftanzoglio Stadium; Attendance: 4,279; Referee: Charalampos Karatzas (Euboea) |

| 2 February 2005 Second leg | Olympiacos | 2–0 (2–1 agg.) | Iraklis | Piraeus |
| 19:00 EET | Abaris 27' (o.g.); Rivaldo 85' | Report | | Stadium: Karaiskakis Stadium; Referee: Frangiskos Somarakakis (Athens) |

==== Quarter-finals ====
| 2 March 2005 First leg | Kastoria | 2–1 | Olympiacos | Kastoria |
| 16:00 EET | Soultanidis 17', 52' | Report | D'Acol 29' | Stadium: Athletic Center of Kastoria; Referee: Dimitris Takidis (Kilkis) |

| 24 March 2005 Second leg | Olympiacos | 5–1 (6–3 agg.) | Kastoria | Piraeus |
| 19:00 EET | Stoltidis 4'; Okkas 10', 24'; Taralidis 14'; Georgatos 31' (pen.) | Report | Athanasiadis 85' | Stadium: Karaiskakis Stadium; Referee: Spyros Vasileiou (Elis) |

==== Semi-finals ====
| 20 April 2005 First leg | AEK Athens | 0–1 | Olympiacos | Athens |
| 19:00 EEST | | Report | Đorđević 8' | Stadium: Olympic Stadium; Attendance: 29,851; Referee: Dimitris Takidis (Kilkis) |

| 27 April 2005 Second leg | Olympiacos | 2–1 (a.e.t.) (3–1 agg.) | AEK Athens | Piraeus |
| 19:00 EEST | Moras 97' (o.g.); Okkas 118' | Report | Liberopoulos 42' | Stadium: Karaiskakis Stadium; Attendance: 27,441; Referee: Charalampos Karatzas (Euboea) |

==== Final ====
| 21 May 2005 Final | Olympiacos | 3–0 | Aris | Patras |
| 19:00 EEST | Đorđević 56' (pen.), 90'; Rivaldo 70' | Report | | Stadium: Pampeloponnisiako Stadium; Attendance: 15,550; Referee: Giorgos Kasnaferis (Athens) |

=== UEFA Champions League ===
==== Group stage ====
| Pos | Team | Pld | W | D | L | GF | GA | GD | Pts | Qualification |
|---|---|---|---|---|---|---|---|---|---|---|
| 1 | (France) Monaco | 6 | 4 | 0 | 2 | 10 | 4 | +6 | 12 | Advance to knockout stage |
| 2 | (England) Liverpool | 6 | 3 | 1 | 2 | 6 | 3 | +3 | 10 | Advance to knockout stage |
| 3 | (Greece) Olympiacos | 6 | 3 | 1 | 2 | 5 | 5 | 0 | 10 | Transfer to UEFA Cup |
| 4 | (Spain) Deportivo La Coruña | 6 | 0 | 2 | 4 | 0 | 9 | −9 | 2 | |

| 15 September 2004 1 | Deportivo La Coruña (Spain) | 0–0 | (Greece) Olympiacos | A Coruña, Spain |
| 20:45 CET | | Report | | Stadium: Estadio Riazor; Attendance: 24,000; Referee: Frank de Bleeckere (Belgium) |

| 28 September 2004 2 | Olympiacos (Greece) | 1–0 | (England) Liverpool | Piraeus, Greece |
| 20:45 CET | Stoltidis 17' | Report | | Stadium: Karaiskakis Stadium; Attendance: 33,000; Referee: Pierluigi Collina (Italy) |

| 19 October 2004 3 | Monaco (France) | 2–1 | (Greece) Olympiacos | Fontvieille, Monaco |
| 20:45 CET | Saviola 3'; Chevantón 10' | Report | Okkas 60' | Stadium: Stade Louis II; Attendance: 16,624; Referee: Jan Wegereef (Netherlands) |

| 3 November 2004 4 | Olympiacos (Greece) | 1–0 | (France) Monaco | Piraeus, Greece |
| 20:45 CET | Schürrer 84' | Report | | Stadium: Karaiskakis Stadium; Attendance: 33,000; Referee: Markus Merk (Germany) |

| 23 November 2004 5 | Olympiacos (Greece) | 1–0 | (Spain) Deportivo La Coruña | Piraeus, Greece |
| 20:45 CET | Đorđević 68' | Report | | Stadium: Karaiskakis Stadium; Attendance: 33,000; Referee: Terje Hauge (Norway) |

| 8 December 2004 6 | Liverpool (England) | 3–1 | (Greece) Olympiacos | Liverpool, England |
| 20:45 CET | Sinama Pongolle 47'; Mellor 81'; Gerrard 86' | Report | Rivaldo 26' | Stadium: Anfield; Attendance: 42,045; Referee: Manuel Mejuto González (Spain) |

=== UEFA Cup ===
==== Knockout stage ====
===== Round of 32 =====
| 17 February 2005 First leg | Olympiacos (Greece) | 1–0 | (France) Sochaux | Piraeus, Greece |
| 20:45 CET | Okkas 29' | Report | | Stadium: Karaiskakis Stadium; Attendance: 33,000; Referee: Nikolai Ivanov (Russia) |

| 24 February 2005 Second leg | Sochaux (France) | 0–1 (0–2 agg.) | (Greece) Olympiacos | Montbéliard, France |
| 19:00 CET | | Report | Stoltidis 67' | Stadium: Stade Auguste Bonal; Attendance: 17,000; Referee: Markus Nobs (Switzerland) |

===== Round of 16 =====
| 10 March 2005 First leg | Olympiacos (Greece) | 1–3 | (England) Newcastle United | Piraeus, Greece |
| 18:00 CET | Đorđević 14' (pen.) | Report | Shearer 12' (pen.); Robert 33'; Kluivert 68' | Stadium: Karaiskakis Stadium; Attendance: 33,000; Referee: Arturo Daudén Ibáñez (Spain) |

| 16 March 2005 Second leg | Newcastle United (England) | 4–0 (7–1 agg.) | (Greece) Olympiacos | Newcastle upon Tyne, England |
| 20:45 | Dyer 18'; Shearer 45', 69'; Bowyer 54' | Report | | Stadium: St James' Park; Attendance: 32,150; Referee: Konrad Plautz (Austria) |

== Team kit ==
Supplier: Umbro
Sponsor(s): Siemens Mobile

| Home | Away |

Source: Olympiacos FC

== Individual Awards ==
| Name | Pos. | Award |
|---|---|---|
| (Greece) Antonios Nikopolidis | Goalkeeper | Alpha Ethniki Goalkeeper of the Season |
