= 2005–06 Olympiacos F.C. season =

Olympiacos
2005–06 season
- Chairman: Sokratis Kokkalis
- Manager: Trond Sollied
- Stadium: Karaiskakis Stadium, Piraeus
- Alpha Ethniki: 1st
- Greek Cup: Winners
- Champions League: Group stage
- Top goalscorer: League: Predrag Đorđević (15); All: Predrag Đorđević (18)
- Highest home attendance: 33,500 vs Olympique Lyonnais (1 November 2005)
Home colours	Away colours	Third colours

The 2005–06 season was Olympiacos's 47th consecutive season in the Alpha Ethniki and their 80th year in existence. The club were played their 9th consecutive season in the UEFA Champions League. In the beginning of the summertime Olympiacos named Norwegian Trond Sollied coach.

== Players ==
=== First-team squad ===
Squad at end of season

Note: Flags indicate national team as defined under FIFA eligibility rules; some limited exceptions apply. Players may hold more than one non-FIFA nationality.

No.	Pos.	Nation	Player
1	MF	GRE	Pantelis Kafes
2	DF	GRE	Christos Patsatzoglou
3	DF	GRE	Stelios Venetidis
4	DF	GRE	Efthimios Kouloucheris
5	DF	GRE	Michalis Kapsis
6	MF	GRE	Ieroklis Stoltidis
7	FW	MEX	Nery Castillo
8	MF	SCG	Miloš Marić
9	FW	CYP	Ioannis Okkas
10	MF	BRA	Rivaldo
11	MF	SCG	Predrag Đorđević
12	DF	ARG	Gabriel Schurrer
14	DF	GRE	Dimitris Mavrogennidis
15	MF	CIV	Yaya Touré
17	MF	GRE	Giannis Taralidis
19	DF	GRE	Athanasios Kostoulas

No.	Pos.	Nation	Player
20	FW	ESP	Dani García
21	DF	GRE	Grigorios Georgatos
22	DF	TUR	Erol Bulut
23	FW	CYP	Michalis Konstantinou
25	DF	GRE	Spyros Vallas
27	MF	ARM	Zhora Hovhannisyan
28	MF	GRE	Konstantinos Mendrinos
30	DF	GRE	Anastasios Pantos
32	DF	GRE	Georgios Anatolakis
33	GK	BEL	Erwin Lemmens
34	GK	GRE	Kleopas Giannou
36	MF	GRE	Giannoulis Fakinos
40	FW	NGA	Haruna Babangida
71	GK	GRE	Antonios Nikopolidis
77	MF	GRE	Tasos Kyriakos
87	GK	GRE	Leonidas Panagopoulos

== Club ==
=== The Management ===
Position	Staff
Manager	(Norway) Trond Sollied
Assistant manager	(North Macedonia) Čedomir Janevski
Assistant manager	(Belgium) Chris Van Puyvelde
Assistant manager	(Belgium) Herman Vermeulen
Club doctor	(Greece) Dimosthenis Anastasakis
Chief scout	(Greece) Vassilis Karapialis

Last updated: May 7, 2006
Source: Olympiacos FC

=== Other information ===
Chairman	(Greece) Socratis Kokkalis
Ground (capacity and dimensions)	Karaiskákis Stadium (33,334 / 120x80 m)

Source: Olympiacos FC article about Socratis Kokkalis and Olympiacos FC article about Karaiskákis Stadium

== Competitions ==
=== Overall ===
Competition	Started round	Current position / round	Final position / round	First match	Last match
Alpha Ethniki	—	—	Winner	28 Aug 2005	14 May 2006
UEFA Champions League	Group Stage	—	Group Stage	13 Sep 2005	6 Dec 2005
Greek Cup	4th Round	—	Winner	9 Nov 2005	10 May 2006

Updated to match played May 14, 2006
Source: Competitions

=== Alpha Ethniki ===
==== League table ====
Pos	Team	Pld	W	D	L	GF	GA	GD	Pts	Qualification or relegation
1	Olympiacos (C)	30	23	1	6	63	23	+40	70	Qualification for Champions League group stage
2	AEK Athens	30	21	4	5	42	20	+22	67 (Note: Head-to-head points (goal difference): AEK 3 (+2), Panathinaikos 3 (-2).)	Qualification for Champions League third qualifying round
3	Panathinaikos	30	21	4	5	55	23	+32	67	Qualification for UEFA Cup first round
4	Iraklis	30	15	6	9	39	31	+8	51	Qualification for UEFA Cup first round
5	Skoda Xanthi	30	13	8	9	31	25	+6	47	Qualification for UEFA Cup first round

Source: Galanis Sports Data
Rules for classification: 1) Points; 2) Head-to-head points; 3) Head-to-head goal difference; 4) Goal difference; 5) Goals scored; 6) Goals against; 7) Play-offs (neutral ground); 8) Draw.
(Note: Criterion 7 is only used if needed to decide champion, teams for relegation or teams for UEFA competitions).
(C) Champions

==== Results summary ====
Overall								Home						Away					
Pld	W	D	L	GF	GA	GD	Pts	W	D	L	GF	GA	GD	W	D	L	GF	GA	GD
30	23	1	6	63	23	+40	70	13	1	1	39	8	+31	10	0	5	24	15	+9

Last updated: 14 May 2006.
Source: Competitive matches

==== Results by round ====
Round	1	2	3	4	5	6	7	8	9	10	11	12	13	14	15	16	17	18	19	20	21	22	23	24	25	26	27	28	29	30
Ground	A	H	A	H	A	H	A	A	H	A	H	A	H	H	A	H	A	H	A	H	A	H	H	A	H	A	H	A	A	H
Result	W	W	W	W	W	L	L	W	W	W	W	W	W	W	W	W	W	W	W	W	W	W	W	L	W	L	W	L	L	D
Position	2	1	1	1	1	2	2	2	1	1	1	1	1	1	1	1	1	1	1	1	1	1	1	1	1	1	1	1	1	1

Source: Competitive matches
A = Away; H = Home; W = Win; D = Draw; L = Loss

==== Matches ====
All times at EET

28 August 2005 1	Panathinaikos	0–2	Olympiacos	Athens
21:00		Report	Stoltidis 35'; Đorđević 86'	Stadium: Olympic Stadium; Attendance: 59,096; Referee: Athanassios Briakos

10 September 2005 2	Olympiacos	5–0	Panionios	Piraeus
21:00	Kafes 25'; Stoltidis 47'; Kostoulas 55'; Taralidis 59'; Babangida 67'	Report		Stadium: Karaiskakis Stadium; Attendance: 0 (closed doors); Referee: Christos Basilou

17 September 2005 3	Kallithea	0–3	Olympiacos	Athens
19:15		Report	Telkiyski 71' (o.g.); Đorđević 77'; Castillo 90+2'	Stadium: Grigoris Lambrakis Stadium; Attendance: 2,812; Referee: Romanos Kontogiannidis

24 September 2005 4	Olympiacos	2–0	Akratitos	Piraeus
17:00	Đorđević 24'; Konstantinou 28'	Report		Stadium: Karaiskakis Stadium; Attendance: 0 (closed doors); Referee: Ilias Mazarakos

2 October 2005 5	AEK Athens	1–3	Olympiacos	Athens
20:00	Alexopoulos 41'	Report	Đorđević 54' (pen.); Konstantinou 87'; Okkas 88'	Stadium: Olympic Stadium; Attendance: 46,394; Referee: Iraklis Tsikinis

16 October 2005 6	Olympiacos	1–2	PAOK	Piraeus
19:00	Touré 59'	Report	Konstantinidis 66', 71'	Stadium: Karaiskakis Stadium; Attendance: 0 (closed doors); Referee: Basiliou Spyridon

23 October 2005 7	OFI	1–0	Olympiacos	Heraklion
19:00	Machlas 67'	Report		Stadium: Pankritio Stadium; Attendance: 11,848; Referee: Athanassios Briakos

29 October 2005 8	Apollon Kalamarias	1–2	Olympiacos	Thessaloniki
17:45	El-Omari 60'	Report	Okkas 45'; Konstantinou 71'	Stadium: Kalamaria Stadium; Attendance: 1,866; Referee: Iraklis Tsikinis

6 November 2005 9	Olympiacos	2–0	Skoda Xanthi	Piraeus
20:00	Torosidis 2' (o.g.); Đorđević 54' (pen.)	Report		Stadium: Karaiskakis Stadium; Attendance: 29,646; Referee: Christoforos Zografos

19 November 2005 10	Atromitos	0–1	Olympiacos	Athens
19:00		Report	Stoltidis 58'	Stadium: Peristeri Stadium; Attendance: 3,869; Referee: Athanassios Briakos

28 November 2005 11	Olympiacos	2–1	Iraklis	Piraeus
21:00	Đorđević 11' (pen.); Okkas 78'	Report	Herrera 22'	Stadium: Karaiskakis Stadium; Attendance: 21,388; Referee: Konstantinos Finokaliotis

3 December 2005 12	Egaleo	1–3	Olympiacos	Athens
19:00	Ma. Marić 56'	Report	Touré 14', 51'; Đorđević 85' (pen.)	Stadium: Stavros Mavrothalassitis Stadium; Attendance: 2,520; Referee: Vasileios Terovitsas

12 December 2005 13	Olympiacos	4–0	AEL	Piraeus
21:00	Dabizas 20' (o.g.); Okkas 39'; Đorđević 70'; Babangida 80'	Report		Stadium: Karaiskakis Stadium; Attendance: 27,301; Referee: Dimitrios Detsis

17 December 2005 14	Olympiacos	1–0	Levadiakos	Piraeus
16:30	Đorđević 9' (pen.)	Report		Stadium: Karaiskakis Stadium; Attendance: 25,525; Referee: Michalis Germanakos

8 January 2006 15	Ionikos	0–1	Olympiacos	Piraeus
19:45		Report	Stoltidis 88'	Stadium: Neapoli Stadium; Attendance: 3,343; Referee: Antonios Kouklakis

15 January 2006 16	Olympiacos	3–2	Panathinaikos	Piraeus
19:00	Rivaldo 37', 58'; Konstantinou 73'	Report	González 20' (pen.); Gekas 74'	Stadium: Karaiskakis Stadium; Attendance: 31,480; Referee: Dimitrios Kalopoulos

30 January 2006 17	Panionios	2–3	Olympiacos	Athens
21:00	Zografakis 10'; Luciano 18'	Report	Konstantinou 25', 82'; Đorđević 39'	Stadium: Nea Smyrni Stadium; Attendance: 4,404; Referee: Charalampos Karatzas

6 February 2006 18	Olympiacos	2–1	Kallithea	Piraeus
21:00	Rivaldo 9'; Georgatos 89'	Report	Koutsospyros 30'	Stadium: Karaiskakis Stadium; Attendance: 16,955; Referee: Basiliou Spyridon

13 February 2006 19	Akratitos	0–1	Olympiacos	Athens
21:00		Report	Rivaldo 68'	Stadium: Yiannis Pathiakakis Stadium; Attendance: 1,638; Referee: Apostolos Nikolaidis

19 February 2006 20	Olympiacos	3–0	AEK Athens	Piraeus
20:00	Okkas 88'; Rivaldo 66', 90+3'	Report		Stadium: Karaiskakis Stadium; Attendance: 31,127; Referee: Iraklis Tsikinis

26 February 2006 21	PAOK	1–2	Olympiacos	Thessaloniki
17:15	Shikabala 5'	Report	Okkas 31'; Konstantinou 77'	Stadium: Toumba Stadium; Attendance: 7,050; Referee: Athanassios Briakos

5 March 2006 22	Olympiacos	4–0	OFI	Piraeus
20:00	Konstantinou 15'; Đorđević 22' (pen.); Rivaldo 38'; Dani 74'	Report		Stadium: Karaiskakis Stadium; Attendance: 25,489; Referee: Vasileios Terovitsas

12 March 2006 23	Olympiacos	2–1	Apollon Kalamarias	Piraeus
20:00	Dani 17'; Đorđević 58' (pen.)	Report	Cleyton 79' (pen.)	Stadium: Karaiskakis Stadium; Attendance: 28,560; Referee: Konstantinos Finokaliotis

18 March 2006 24	Skoda Xanthi	1–0	Olympiacos	Xanthi
17:00	Kazakis 56'	Report		Stadium: Skoda Xanthi Arena; Attendance: 5,361; Referee: Ioannis Flambouris

27 March 2006 25	Olympiacos	3–0	Atromitos	Piraeus
21:00	Konstantinou 18'; Bulut 70'; Đorđević 75'	Report		Stadium: Karaiskakis Stadium; Attendance: 22,200; Referee: Dimitrios Dabosis

3 April 2006 26	Iraklis	2–0	Olympiacos	Thessaloniki
21:00	Herrera 22'; Epalle 52'	Report		Stadium: Kaftanzoglio Stadium; Attendance: 6,816; Referee: Vasileios Terovitsas

8 April 2006 27	Olympiacos	5–1	Egaleo	Piraeus
19:00	Kafes 6'; Stoltidis 49'; Đorđević 53'; Okkas 59'; Castillo 90+1'	Report	Papoutsis 51'	Stadium: Karaiskakis Stadium; Attendance: 28,228; Referee: Charalampos Karatzas

16 April 2006 28	AEL	2–1	Olympiacos	Larissa
21:15	Digozis 7' (pen.); Aloneftis 57'	Report	Đorđević 54'	Stadium: Alcazar Stadium; Attendance: 7,787; Referee: Ilias Mazarakos

30 April 2006 29	Levadiakos	3–2	Olympiacos	Livadeia
18:00	Dimitropoulos 6'; Bushi 9'; Rusev 17'	Report	Mi. Marić 48'; Konstantinou 60'	Stadium: Levadia Municipal Stadium; Attendance: 2,365; Referee: Christoforos Zografos

14 May 2006 30	Olympiacos	0–0	Ionikos	Piraeus
17:45		Report		Stadium: Karaiskakis Stadium; Attendance: 31,178; Referee: Lazaros Polatian

=== Greek Cup ===
==== Fourth round ====
10 November 2005	Paniliakos	0–4	Olympiacos	Pyrgos
		Report	Okkas 17'; Dani 19', 44'; Đorđević 86'	Stadium: Pyrgos Stadium; Referee: Dimitris Detsis

==== Fifth round ====
20 December 2005	Thrasyvoulos	0–2	Olympiacos	Fyli
		Report	Dani 14'; Papathanisou 90+2' (o.g.)	Stadium: Fyli Municipal Stadium; Referee: Dimitris Kalopoulos

==== Quarter-finals ====
2 February 2006 First leg	Olympiacos	1–1	Skoda Xanthi	Piraeus
	Rivaldo 20'	Report	Lambriakos 86'	Stadium: Karaiskakis Stadium; Referee: Iraklis Tsikinis

9 February 2006 Second leg	Skoda Xanthi	0–1 (1–2 agg.)	Olympiacos	Xanthi
		Report	Rivaldo 75'	Stadium: Skoda Xanthi Arena; Referee: Giorgos Kasnaferis

==== Semi-finals ====
22 March 2006 First leg	Olympiacos	3–1	AEL	Piraeus
	Konstantinou 31', 80'; Stoltidis 42'	Report	Aloneftis 72'	Stadium: Karaiskakis Stadium; Referee: Christoforos Zografos

12 April 2006 Second leg	AEL	0–1 (1–4 agg.)	Olympiacos	Larissa
		Report	Castillo 90+4'	Stadium: Alkazar Stadium; Referee: Kyros Vassaras

==== Final ====
10 May 2006 Final	Olympiacos	3–0	AEK Athens	Heraklion
20:30	Konstantinou 61'; Ivić 70' (o.g.); Castillo 90'	Report		Stadium: Pankritio Stadium; Attendance: 22,079; Referee: Vasilis Terovitsas

=== UEFA Champions League ===
==== Group stage ====
Pos	Team	Pld	W	D	L	GF	GA	GD	Pts	Qualification
1	(France) Lyon	6	5	1	0	13	4	+9	16	Advance to knockout stage
2	(Spain) Real Madrid	6	3	1	2	10	8	+2	10	Advance to knockout stage
3	(Norway) Rosenborg	6	1	1	4	6	11	−5	4	Transfer to UEFA Cup
4	(Greece) Olympiacos	6	1	1	4	7	13	−6	4	

Source: RSSSF

All times at CET

13 September 2005 1	Olympiacos (Greece)	1–3	(Norway) Rosenborg	Piraeus, Greece
20:45	Lago 19' (o.g.)	Report	Skjelbred 42'; Mavrogenidis 48' (o.g.); Storflor 90+4'	Stadium: Karaiskakis Stadium; Attendance: 28,000; Referee: Stefano Farina (Italy)

28 September 2005 2	Real Madrid (Spain)	2–1	(Greece) Olympiacos	Madrid, Spain
20:45	Raúl 9'; Soldado 86'	Report	Kafes 48'	Stadium: Santiago Bernabéu Stadium; Attendance: 50,000; Referee: Markus Merk (Germany)

19 October 2005 3	Lyon (France)	2–1	(Greece) Olympiacos	Lyon, France
20:45	Juninho 4'; Govou 89'	Report	Kafes 84'	Stadium: Stade de Gerland; Attendance: 35,000; Referee: Graham Poll (England)

1 November 2005 4	Olympiacos (Greece)	1–4	(France) Lyon	Piraeus, Greece
20:45	Babangida 3'	Report	Juninho 41'; Carew 44', 57'; Diarra 55'	Stadium: Karaiskakis Stadium; Attendance: 33,500; Referee: Peter Fröjdfeldt (Sweden)

23 November 2005 5	Rosenborg (Norway)	1–1	(Greece) Olympiacos	Trondheim, Norway
20:45	Helstad 88'	Report	Rivaldo 25'	Stadium: Lerkendal Stadion; Attendance: 21,270; Referee: Paul Allaerts (Belgium)

6 December 2005 6	Olympiacos (Greece)	2–1	(Spain) Real Madrid	Piraeus, Greece
20:45	Bulut 50'; Rivaldo 87'	Report	Ramos 7'	Stadium: Karaiskakis Stadium; Attendance: 30,000; Referee: Kim Milton Nielsen (Denmark)

== Team kit ==
Supplier: Puma
Sponsor(s): Siemens

Home	Away	Third

Source: Olympiacos FC

== Individual Awards ==
Name	Pos.	Award
(Brazil) Rivaldo	Attacking Midfielder	Alpha Ethniki Best Foreign Player
(Greece) Ieroklis Stoltidis	Central Midfielder	Alpha Ethniki Greek Player of the Season
(Greece) Antonios Nikopolidis	Goalkeeper	Alpha Ethniki Goalkeeper of the Season
