= 2004 Greek Football Cup final =

2004 Greek Cup final
- Event: 2003–04 Greek Football Cup
Panathinaikos	Olympiacos
3	1
- Date: 8 May 2004
- Venue: Nea Smyrni Stadium, Nea Smyrni
- Man of the Match: Michalis Konstantinou (Panathinaikos)
- Referee: Giorgos Kasnaferis (Athens)
- Attendance: 7,500
- Weather: Mostly Cloudy; 19 °C (66 °F); 56% humidity

The 2004 Greek Cup final was the 60th final of the Greek Cup. The match took place on 8 May 2004 at Nea Smyrni Stadium. The contesting teams were Panathinaikos and Olympiacos. It was Panathinaikos' twenty sixth Greek Cup final in their 96 years of existence and Olympiacos' thirtieth Greek Cup final in their 79-year history. The final was originally scheduled to take place at the Pampeloponnisiako Stadium in Patras, but at the last minute the approval for its performance was not given after the refusal of the Achaia Police Department, for fear of provoking incidents by the fans of both teams and even a few months before the Olympic Games, and Patras was among the Olympic cities. Finally, following recommendations from the Minister of Public Order, Giorgos Voulgarakis, that the final should be held within the Attica Basin for the best possible policing, it was decided to take place at the Nea Smyrni Stadium, as the Olympic Stadium, due to upcoming games, was in the final phase of its reconstruction. Initially, the mayor of Nea Smyrni and president of the amateur Panionios, George Koutelakis, expressed his opposition and refusal to concede the stadium and for security reasons the number of tickets available for sale was limited.

== Venue ==
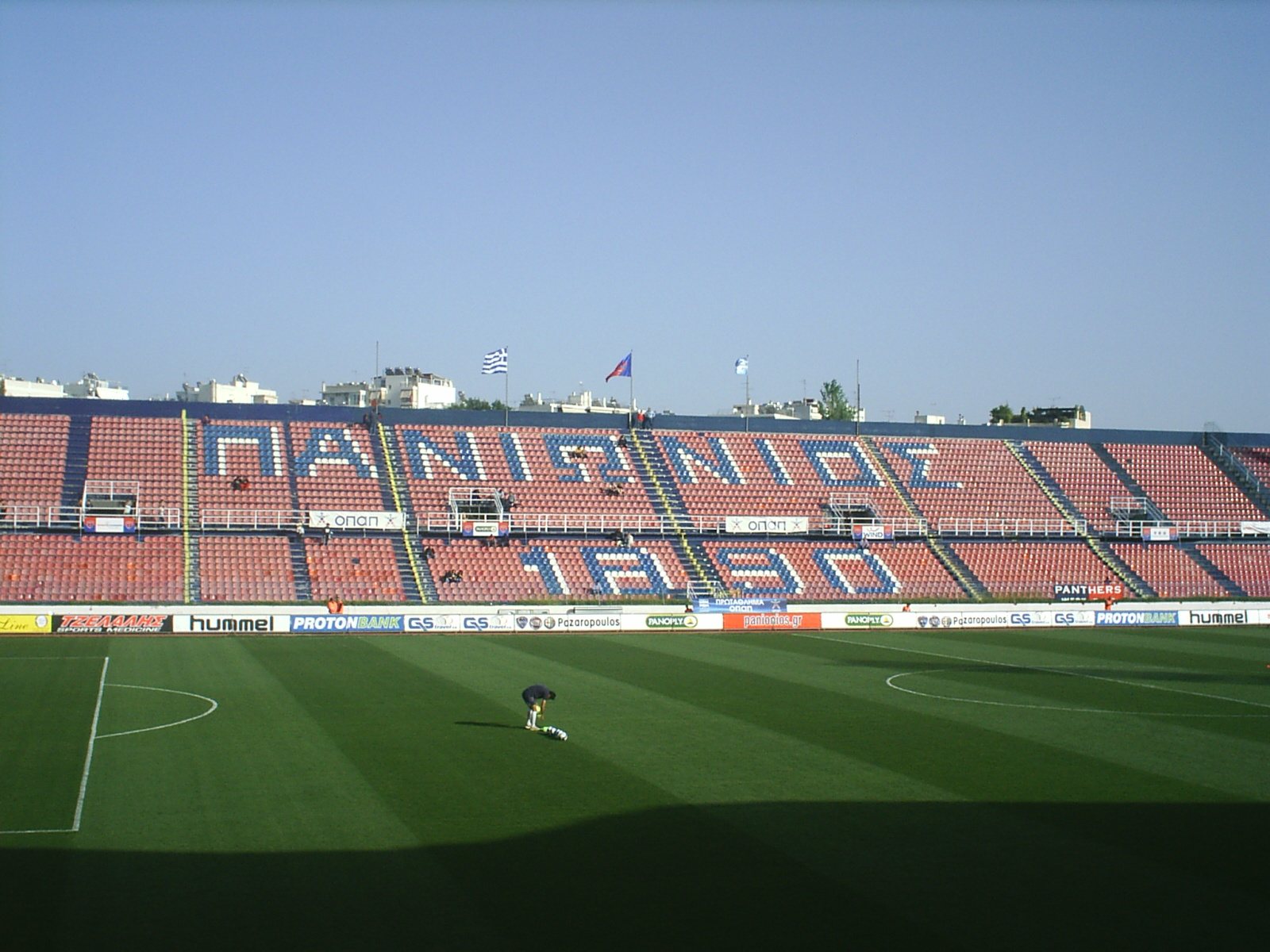
Nea Smyrni Stadium.

This was the first Greek Cup final held at Nea Smyrni Stadium.

Nea Smyrni Stadium was built in 1939 and was renovated twice, in 2001 and 2003. The stadium is used as a venue for Panionios. Its current capacity is 11,342.

== Background ==
Panathinaikos had reached the Greek Cup final twenty five times, winning fifteen of them. The last time that they had won the Cup was in 1995 (1–0 against AEK Athens). The last time they had played in a final was in 1999, where they had lost to Olympiacos by 2–0.

Olympiacos had reached the Greek Cup final twenty nine times, winning twenty of them. The last time that they had won the Cup was in 1999 (2–0 against Panathinaikos). The last time they had played in a final was in 2002, where they had lost to AEK Athens by 2–1.

The two teams had met each other in a Cup final ten times in the 1960, 1962, 1965, 1968, 1969, 1975, 1986, 1988, 1993 and 1999 finals.

== Route to the final ==
Panathinaikos				Round	Olympiacos			
Opponent	Agg.	1st leg	2nd leg		Opponent	Agg.	1st leg	2nd leg
Niki Volos	3–1	2–0 (H)	1–1 (A)	First round	Vyzas Megara	6–1	2–0 (H)	4–1 (A)
Bye				Second round	Ergotelis	6–3	3–2 (H)	3–1 (A)
OFI	2–1	1–0 (H)	1–1 (A)	Round of 16	Skoda Xanthi	3–0	1–0 (H)	2–0 (A)
Patraikos	3–1	1–0 (A)	2–1 (H)	Quarter-finals	Panionios	1–0	1–0 (H)	0–0 (A)
AEK Athens	3–2	2–2 (H)	1–0 (A)	Semi-finals	Kastoria	4–1	3–0 (A)	1–1 (H)

== Match ==
=== Details ===
8 May 2004
21:00 EEST

Panathinaikos	3–1	Olympiacos
Papadopoulos 3'; Konstantinou 68', 80'	Report (pages 18-19)	Giovanni 65'

Nea Smyrni Stadium, Nea Smyrni
Attendance: 7,500
Referee: Giorgos Kasnaferis (Argolida)

Panathinaikos	Olympiacos

GK	12	(Greece) Kostas Chalkias
RB	5	(Greece) Giourkas Seitaridis	(yellow card) 2'
CB	8	(Greece) Giannis Goumas
CB	2	(Denmark) René Henriksen
CB	3	(South Africa) Nasief Morris
LB	6	(Germany) Markus Münch
DM	20	(Greece) Angelos Basinas (c)	(yellow card) 77'
DM	35	(Denmark) Jan Michaelsen		(substituted off) 78'
AM	40	(Argentina) Ezequiel González		(substituted off) 90'
CF	11	(Greece) Dimitrios Papadopoulos		(substituted off) 70'
CF	19	(Cyprus) Michalis Konstantinou
Substitutes:
GK	33	(Greece) Stefanos Kotsolis
DF	24	(Greece) Loukas Vyntra		(substituted on) 90'
MF	14	(Lithuania) Raimondas Žutautas		(substituted on) 78'
MF	18	(Romania) Lucian Sânmărtean
MF	22	(Greece) Miltiadis Sapanis		(substituted on) 70'
MF	27	(Greece) Pantelis Konstantinidis
FW	7	(Croatia) Goran Vlaović
Manager:
(Israel) Itzhak Shum

GK	34	(Greece) Kleopas Giannou
RB	30	(Greece) Anastasios Pantos
CB	25	(Greece) Spyros Vallas		(substituted off) 22'
CB	32	(Greece) Georgios Anatolakis	(yellow card) 61'
LB	3	(Greece) Stylianos Venetidis	(yellow card) 2'
DM	6	(Greece) Ieroklis Stoltidis
DM	5	(France) Christian Karembeu
RM	71	(Greece) Grigoris Georgatos	(yellow card) 14'	(substituted off) 15'
LM	11	(Serbia and Montenegro) Predrag Đorđević (c)
SS	10	(Brazil) Giovanni
CF	7	(Mexico) Nery Castillo	(yellow card) 86'
Substitutes:
GK	22	(Greece) Fanis Katergiannakis
DF	14	(Greece) Dimitrios Mavrogenidis		(substituted on) 22'
DF	19	(Greece) Athanasios Kostoulas
MF	1	(Greece) Pantelis Kafes
MF	31	(Greece) Georgios Georgiadis
FW	9	(Greece) Lambros Choutos		(substituted on) 15' (substituted off) 53'
FW	21	(Poland) Marcin Kuźba		(substituted on) 53'
Manager:
(Greece) Nikos Alefantos

Man of the Match:
(Cyprus) Michalis Konstantinou (Panathinaikos)

Assistant referees:
Giorgos Papadopoulos (Thessaloniki)
Dimitris Tsortanidis (Achaea)

Match rules

- 90 minutes
- 30 minutes of extra time if necessary
- Penalty shootout if scores still level
- Seven named substitutes
- Maximum of three substitutions

== See also ==
- 2003–04 Greek Football Cup
