= Giannis Taralidis =

Greek footballer

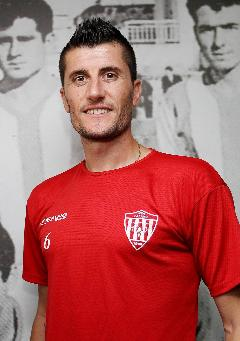
- Taralidis with Nea Salamina in 2013

Personal information
- Full name: Ioannis Taralidis
- Date of birth: 17 May 1981 (age 45)
- Place of birth: Aridaia, Greece
- Height: 1.88 m (6 ft 2 in)
- Position: Defensive midfielder

Youth career
- Almopos Aridea

Senior career*
Years	Team	Apps	(Gls)
1999–2003	Paniliakos	87	(10)
2003–2007	Olympiacos	27	(1)
2007–2009	OFI	46	(6)
2009–2011	Levadiakos	60	(6)
2011–2012	Glyfada	19	(4)
2012–2013	Doxa Drama	35	(6)
2013–2014	Nea Salamina	10	(0)
2014–2015	Ermis Aradippou	47	(4)
2015–2016	Kissamikos	11	(2)
2016–2017	Karmiotissa	25	(3)
2017–2019	Ermis Aradippou	53	(13)
2019	PO Xylotymbou	7	(1)
2020–2021	Asteras Meneou		
2021	K.N. Vasilikou		
2022	Dynamo Pervolion		
2022–2025	Mazotos	6	(0)
2025–	Dynamo Pervolion		

International career
1998	Greece U17	6	(1)
1999	Greece U19	3	(2)
2000–2001	Greece U21	3	(0)
2004	Greece U23	3	(2)
- * Club domestic league appearances and goals

Giannis Taralidis (Greek: Γιάννης Ταραλίδης; born 17 May 1981) is a Greek former professional footballer who played as a midfielder.

== Club career ==
Taralidis started his career by APS Almopos Arideas. In 1999, at the age of 18 started his professional career with the Paniliakos. He remained in the club until the first half of 2003–04 season. Paniliakos struggled between Super League and Football League during that period.

In January 2004, Taralidis signed with Olympiacos, in which he remained until 2007. During that period, Olympiacos had a squad of renowned players in the same position as Taralidis (Karembeu, Yaya Toure, Ieroklis Stoltidis, Pantelis Kafes) so it was not easy for a young player to get equal opportunities for playing. On 18 February 2005, he made his first appearance with the club in the UEFA Europa League in a victory 1–0 against Sochaux.

After 45 appearances with Olympiacos in all competitions, in the summer of 2007 he signed with OFI made a total of 46 appearances with the club in the next two years in Super League. In 2007, he participated with OFI in UEFA Intertoto Cup. In the summer of 2008 had significant offers to join the two leading Cypriot football clubs Omonia and Anorthosis, but he denied due to family obligations and remained with his club, promoted to third team captain. In 2009, he joined Levadiakos. In his first season, he participated in Super League, but the next season due to relegation played in the Football League. In 2011, due to lack of offers, he signed with Glyfada, in Football League 2. In 2012–13, he played with Doxa Drama, in the Football League where he was also the team captain.

The summer of 2013 he signed a contract with Nea Salamina in the First Division in Cyprus. He was elected team captain. After a half-season in Nea Salamina, Taralidis signed a contract for six months with Ermis Aradippou, and renew his contract for a year.

Ermis Aradippou were crowned Cypriot Super Cup champions after a 95th-minute winner from Taralidis earned them a 2–1 victory over APOEL FC – three minutes after the Nicosia outfit had levelled the match. The historic win, coming just two weeks after Ermis was knocked out of the UEFA Europa League third qualifying round by BSC Young Boys, marked their first-ever domestic trophy success. It also meant revenge on the big stage for Ermis, who lost to APOEL in the Cyprus Cup final last May. In summer 2015, he signed a year contract with Kissamikos. On 5 April 2016, he signed a year contract with another Cypriot club Karmiotissa for an undisclosed fee. On 23 June 2017, he returned to Ermis Aradippou signing a two-year contract.

== International career ==
In 2001, Taralidis participated with Greece U21 in the Mediterranean Games. Additionally, he participated with the Greek Olympic team in the 2004 Olympic Games, playing all the games in the group stage. He scored on a draw play against South Korea, and in the game against Mexico.

== Honours ==
Olympiacos

- Super League Greece: 2004–05, 2005–06, 2006–07
- Greek Cup: 2004–05, 2005–06,
- Greek Super Cup: 2007

Ermis Aradippou

- Cypriot Super Cup: 2014
