= Nikolaos Mitrou =

Greek footballer

Personal information
- Full name: Nikolaos Mitrou
- Date of birth: 10 July 1984 (age 42)
- Place of birth: Chalcis, Greece
- Height: 1.79 m (5 ft 10 1/2 in)
- Position: Midfielder

Youth career
- Apollon Eretreias

Senior career*
Years	Team	Apps	(Gls)
2002–2007	Panionios	53	(6)
2005	→ Niki Volos (loan)	10	(3)
2007	→ Digenis Akritas Morphou (loan)	3	(0)
2007–2008	Ethnikos Asteras	17	(2)
2008	Lamia	11	(0)
2009	Aias Salamina F.C.	22	(4)
2009–2010	Kastoria	7	(0)
2010–2011	Pierikos	6	(0)
2011	Enosi Mideas	3	(0)
2012	AO Poros F.C.	2	(0)
2012	Ethnikos Asteras	7	(1)
2012	FC Zenit Čáslav	7	(1)
2012–2013	Paniliakos	12	(2)
2013–2014	A.O.Kymi F.C.	21	(2)
2014–2015	Glyfada F.C.		
2015	AO Thiva		
2016	Hersonissos F.C.		
2016-2017	Irodotos FC		
2017	Nafpaktiakos Asteras F.C.		
2017	AO Koskinon	11	(1)
2018	Tamynaikos F.C.		
2018-2019	Evoikos Agiou Nikolaou		
2019	Miaoulis Fyllon		

International career
2004	Greece Olympic	2	(0)
- * Club domestic league appearances and goals

Nikolaos Mitrou (Greek: Νικόλαος Μήτρου; born 10 July 1984) is a Greek former professional footballer who played as a midfielder.

== Career ==
Born in Chalcis, Mitrou began his playing career by signing with Panionios F.C. in August 2002. He made 32 appearances in the Super League Greece for the club. He also played for Niki Volos, Digenis Akritas Morphou, Ethnikos Asteras, Lamia, Aias Salamina F.C., Kastoria, Pierikos, Enosi Mideas, Poros and FC Zenit Čáslav.
