= Greece national under-23 football team =

National U-23 football team

Greece
- Nickname(s): Ethniki (National); Galanolefki (Sky blue-white)
- Association: Hellenic Football Federation
- Confederation: UEFA (Europe)
- Head coach: Vacant
- Captain: Vacant
- Most caps: 11 players (3)
- Top scorer: Giannis Taralidis (2)
- Home stadium: Olympic Stadium
- FIFA code: GRE
First colours	Second colours

First international
- Sweden 9–0 Greece (Antwerp, Belgium; August 29, 1920)

Biggest win
- none

Biggest defeat
- Sweden 9–0 Greece (Antwerp, Belgium; August 29, 1920)

Olympics
- Appearances: 3 (first in 1920)
- Best result: Round 1: 1920, 1952, 2004

Greece national under-23 football team represents Greece in international football competitions in Olympic Games. The selection is limited to players under the age of 23, except three overaged players. The team is controlled by the Hellenic Football Federation (HFF).

== Summer Olympics ==
Olympics Record
Year	Host	Round	Pos.	GP	W	D	L	GS	GA
1896	(Greece) Athens	No football tournament							
1900	(France) Paris	Did not qualify							
1904	(United States) St. Louis	Did not qualify							
1908	(United Kingdom) London	Did not qualify							
1912	(Sweden) Stockholm	Did not qualify							
1920	(Belgium) Antwerp	Preliminary Round	-	1	0	0	1	0	9
1924	(France) Paris	did not qualify							
1928	(Netherlands) Amsterdam	did not qualify							
1932	(United States) Los Angeles	No football tournament							
1936	(Germany) Berlin	Did not qualify							
1948	(United Kingdom) London	Did not qualify							
1952	(Finland) Helsinki	Preliminary Round	-	1	0	0	1	1	2
1956	(Australia) Melbourne	Did not qualify							
1960	(Italy) Rome	Did not qualify							
1964	(Japan) Tokyo	Did not qualify							
1968	Mexico City	Did not qualify							
1972	(West Germany) Munich	Did not qualify							
1976	(Canada) Montreal	Did not qualify							
1980	(Soviet Union) Moscow	Did not qualify							
1984	(United States) Los Angeles	Did not qualify							
1988	(South Korea) Seoul	Did not qualify							
1992	(Spain) Barcelona	Did not qualify							
1996	(United States) Atlanta	Did not qualify							
2000	(Australia) Sydney	Did not qualify							
2004	(Greece) Athens	Round 1	15th	3	0	1	2	4	7
2008	(China) Beijing	Did not qualify							
2012	(United Kingdom) London	Did not qualify							
2016	(Brazil) Rio de Janeiro	Did not qualify							
2020	(Japan) Tokyo	Did not qualify							
2024	(France) Paris	Did not qualify							
Total		3/19	15th	5	0	1	4	5	18

== Players ==
=== Olympic Squads ===
==== 1920 Summer Olympics ====
Head coach: (Greece) Georgios Kalafatis

No.	Pos.	Player	Date of birth (age)	Caps	Club
	FW	Giorgos Andrianopoulos	1900	0	(Greece) Piraikos Syndesmos
	FW	Yiannis Andrianopoulos	1900	1	(Greece) Piraiki Enosi
	FW	Georgios Chatziandreou	1899	1	(Greece) Piraikos Syndesmos
	GK	Dimitris Demertzis		0	(Greece) Panathinaikos
	MF	Sotiris Despotopoulos		0	(Greece) Panionios
	FW	Theodoros Dimitriou	1899	1	(Greece) Apollon Smyrnis
	GK	Antonis Fotiadis	1899	1	(Greece) Apollon Smyrnis
	DF	Agamenon Gilis	1899	1	(Greece) Apollon Smyrnis
	MF	Dimitris Gotis	1899	1	(Greece) Apollon Smyrnis
	FW	Georgios Kalafatis	1890	1	(Greece) Panathinaikos
	DF	Nikos Kaloudis	1899	1	(Greece) Piraiki Enosi
	MF	Apostolos Nikolaidis	1896	1	(Greece) Panathinaikos
	FW	Theodoros Nikolaidis	1899	1	(Greece) F.C. Goudi Athens
	MF	Christos Peppas	1899	1	(Greece) Piraiki Enosi
		Vasilis Samios		0	(Greece) Apollon Smyrnis
		Ioannis Stavropoulos		0	(Greece) Panathinaikos

==== 1952 Summer Olympics ====
Head coach: (Greece) Antonis Migiakis

No.	Pos.	Player	Date of birth (age)	Caps	Goals	Club
	MF	Thanasis Bebis	26 June 1928 (aged 24)	1	0	(Hellenic Football Federation) Olympiacos
	MF	Giorgos Darivas	12 March 1926 (aged 26)	1	0	(Hellenic Football Federation) Olympiacos
	FW	Babis Drosos	19 March 1927 (aged 25)	1	0	(Hellenic Football Federation) Olympiacos
	FW	Pavlos Emmanouilidis	1929 (aged 23)	1	1	(Hellenic Football Federation) AEK Athens
	DF	Youlielmos Arvanitis	1920 (aged 32)	1	0	(Hellenic Football Federation) AEK Athens
	MF	Ioannis Ioannou	1931 (aged 21)	1	0	(Hellenic Football Federation) Ethnikos Piraeus
	DF	Kostas Linoxilakis	5 March 1933 (aged 19)	1	0	(Hellenic Football Federation) Panathinaikos
	FW	Ilias Papageorgiou	1925 (aged 27)	1	0	(Hellenic Football Federation) AEK Athens
	GK	Nikos Petzaropoulos	17 January 1927 (aged 25)	1	0	(Hellenic Football Federation) Panionios
	MF	Kostas Poulis	1928 (aged 24)	1	0	(Hellenic Football Federation) AEK Athens
	DF	Ilias Rosidis	3 February 1927 (aged 25)	1	0	(Hellenic Football Federation) Olympiacos
	GK	Michalis Delavinias	1 January 1921 (aged 31)	0	0	(Hellenic Football Federation) AEK Athens
	MF	Babis Kotridis	30 October 1928 (aged 23)	0	0	(Hellenic Football Federation) Olympiacos
	DF	Andreas Mouratis	29 November 1926 (aged 25)	0	0	(Hellenic Football Federation) Olympiacos
	FW	Panagiotis Patakas	1 January 1929 (aged 23)	0	0	(Hellenic Football Federation) AEK Athens
	FW	Lakis Petropoulos	1929 (aged 23)	0	0	(Hellenic Football Federation) Panathinaikos

==== 2004 Summer Olympics ====
Head coach: (Greece) Stratos Apostolakis

No.	Pos.	Player	Date of birth (age)	Caps	Goals	Club
1	GK	Georgios Abaris	23 April 1982 (aged 22)	2	0	(Hellenic Football Federation) Iraklis
2	DF	Aris Galanopoulos	13 September 1981 (aged 22)	1	0	(Hellenic Football Federation) Kalamata
3	MF	Panagiotis Lagos	18 July 1985 (aged 19)	3	0	(Hellenic Football Federation) Iraklis
4	DF	Vangelis Moras	26 August 1981 (aged 22)	3	0	(Hellenic Football Federation) AEK Athens
5	DF	Spyros Vallas	26 August 1981 (aged 22)	3	0	(Hellenic Football Federation) Olympiacos
6	MF	Ieroklis Stoltidis*	2 February 1975 (aged 29)	3	1	(Hellenic Football Federation) Olympiacos
7	FW	Anestis Agritis	16 April 1981 (aged 23)	1	0	(Hellenic Football Federation) Egaleo
8	MF	Konstantinos Nebegleras*	14 April 1975 (aged 29)	3	0	(Hellenic Football Federation) Iraklis
9	FW	Dimitris Salpingidis	18 August 1981 (aged 22)	3	0	(Hellenic Football Federation) PAOK
10	FW	Nikolaos Mitrou	10 July 1983 (aged 21)	2	0	(Hellenic Football Federation) Panionios
11	FW	Dimitrios Papadopoulos	20 October 1981 (aged 22)	3	1	(Hellenic Football Federation) Panathinaikos
12	DF	Christos Karipidis	2 December 1982 (aged 21)	0	0	(Hellenic Football Federation) PAOK
13	MF	Fanouris Goundoulakis	13 July 1981 (aged 23)	0	0	(Hellenic Football Federation) Panionios
14	MF	Georgios Fotakis	29 October 1981 (aged 22)	1	0	(Hellenic Football Federation) Egaleo
15	MF	Miltiadis Sapanis*	28 January 1976 (aged 28)	3	0	(Hellenic Football Federation) Panathinaikos
16	DF	Loukas Vyntra	5 February 1981 (aged 23)	3	0	(Hellenic Football Federation) Panathinaikos
17	MF	Giannis Taralidis	17 May 1981 (aged 23)	3	2	(Hellenic Football Federation) Olympiacos
18	GK	Kleopas Giannou	4 May 1982 (aged 22)	1	0	(Hellenic Football Federation) Olympiacos

* Overage player.

=== Overage players in Olympic Games ===
Tournament	Player 1	Player 2	Player 3
2004	Konstantinos Nebegleras (MF)	Miltiadis Sapanis (MF)	Ieroklis Stoltidis (MF)

== Olympic match record ==
29 August 1920 First round	Sweden	9–0	Greece	Antwerp, Belgium
10:00 CET (UTC+1)	Olsson 4', 79'; Karlsson 15', 20', 21', 51', 85'; Wicksell 25'; Dahl 31'	Report		Stadium: Olympic Stadium; Attendance: 5,000; Referee: Charles Barette (Belgium)

15 July 1952 Preliminary round	Denmark	2–1	Greece	Tampere, Finland
19:00 CET (UTC+1)	Petersen 36', 37'	Report	Emmanouilidis 85'	Stadium: Ratina Stadion; Attendance: 4,372; Referee: Wolf Karni (Finland)

11 August 2004 Matchday 1	South Korea	2–2	Greece	Thessaloniki, Greece
20:30CET (UTC+1)	Dong-jin 43'; Vyntra 64' (o.g.)	Report	Taralidis 78'; Papadopoulos 82'	Stadium: Kaftanzoglio Stadium; Attendance: 25,152; Referee: Jorge Larrionda (Uruguay)

14 August 2004 Matchday 2	Greece	0–2	Mali	Thessaloniki, Greece
20:30CET (UTC+1)		Report	Berthe 2'; N'Diaye 45'	Stadium: Kaftanzoglio Stadium; Attendance: 17,123; Referee: Carlos Torres (Paraguay)

17 August 2004 Matchday 3	Greece	2–3	Mexico	Volos, Greece
20:30CET (UTC+1)	Taralidis 83'; Stoltidis 90+3'	Report	Marquez 47'; Bravo 70', 86'	Stadium: Panthessaliko Stadium; Attendance: 21,597; Referee: Divine Evehe (Cameroon)

== Goalscorers ==
#	Name	Career	Goals	Caps
1	Giannis Taralidis	2004	2	3
2	Dimitrios Papadopoulos	2004	1	3
3	Ieroklis Stoltidis	2004	1	3
4	Pavlos Emmanouilidis	1952	1	1

== Other appearances ==
- 1906 Intercalated Games squads – Greece

=== Mediterranean Games ===
Football at the Mediterranean Games
Year	Placing	M	W	D	L	GF	GA
Until 1967	See Greece national football team						
(Turkey) 1971	6th	3	0	1	2	2	9
(Algeria) 1975	9th	4	0	0	4	3	13
(Socialist Federal Republic of Yugoslavia) 1979	4th	5	1	1	3	8	12
(Morocco) 1983	5th	2	1	1	0	2	1
(Syria) 1987	4th	5	2	1	2	3	3
1991–present	See Greece national under-20 team						
Total	5/5	19	4	4	11	18	38

== See also ==
- Greece national football team
- Greece national under-21 football team
- Greece national under-20 football team
- Greece national under-19 football team
- Greece national under-17 football team
