= Agamemnon Gilis =

Greek footballer

Agamemnon Gilis (Greek: Αγαμέμνων Γκίλης; born 1891, date of death unknown) was a Greek football player who played for the clubs Apollon in Smyrna, and later for Panionios in Athens, following the Greco-Turkish war between 1919 and 1922. He was a member of the national team for the 1920 Olympic Games in Antwerp.
