= Dimitrios Gotis =

Greek footballer

Personal information
- Nationality: Greek
- Born: 1899

Sport
- Sport: Football

Dimitrios Gotis (Greek: Δημήτριος Γώτης; born 1899, date of death unknown) was a Greek football player who played for the club Apollon Smyrnis. He was member of the national team for the 1920 Olympic Games in Antwerp.
