= Grigoris Georgatos =

Greek footballer (born 1972)

Personal information
- Full name: Grigorios Georgatos
- Date of birth: 31 October 1972 (age 53)
- Place of birth: Piraeus, Greece
- Height: 1.74 m (5 ft 9 in)
- Positions: Left-back; left midfielder; left winger

Youth career
- 1984–: Aetos Patras
- –1990: Ethnikos Patras
- 1990–1991: Panachaiki

Senior career*
Years	Team	Apps	(Gls)
1991–1995	Panachaiki	120	(22)
1995–1999	Olympiacos	106	(22)
1999–2002	Internazionale	38	(3)
2000–2001	→ Olympiacos (loan)	20	(5)
2002–2003	AEK Athens	29	(7)
2003–2007	Olympiacos	68	(5)
Total		381	(64)

International career
1995–2001	Greece	35	(3)
- * Club domestic league appearances and goals

Grigoris Georgatos (Greek: Γρηγόρης Γεωργάτος; born 31 October 1972) is a Greek former professional footballer who played as a left-back. He was nicknamed the “Greek Roberto Carlos” and "the crazy bald" (Greek: "ο Τρελός φαλακρός") due to his highly-aggressive play on the pitch and his shaved hairstyle.

== Club career ==
=== Early career ===
He began his career in 1991 at Panachaiki when his skills were first noticed in the Alpha Ethniki. After four and a half seasons in December 1995, he was transferred to Olympiacos. He came to the club playing as an attacking midfielder. He had to "fit" in the same line-up as Predrag Đorđević, so Dušan Bajević had he return to left-back. He gradually impressed with his performances lifting three consecutive championships with them from 1996 to 1997, when he finished as the side's top scorer despite his defensive role.

=== Internazionale ===
In the 1998–99 season, while playing in a UEFA Champions League match against Juventus, Georgatos caught the eye of Italian club Inter Milan, signing him in the 1999–2000 season for €7 million. He settled well in Serie A, playing 28 matches and scoring 2 goals for Inter.

Despite that, the following season he returned to Olympiacos for a season-long loan, as he was sad and missed his family, house and Athens city. After his loan was over, he returned to the Serie A, with Georgatos choosing to rejoin Inter after losing his first-team place at the club from Piraeus.

Although he returned to Inter, he could not get back into the first-team because of an injury that kept him out for a while, playing only 10 matches and scoring 1 goal that season. With his second spell in Italy being unsuccessful, Georgatos expressed his desire to return to Greece. He asked to return to Olympiacos, but the red-whites refused as they had just signed Stylianos Venetidis who also played in the same position.

=== AEK Athens ===
The boss of AEK Athens Chrarilaos Psomiadis, noticing the disire of Georgatos to return to his homeland took the opportunity and on 22 July 2002 he brought him to the club for a fee of €3 million There he was reunited with Bajević, as well as many teammates with the national team, such as Ilias Atmatsidis, Theodoros Zagorakis, Vasilios Tsiartas and Demis Nikolaidis. Due to the presence of Michalis Kasapis as the main left-back, Georgatos was used mainly as left midfielder to fin tin the squad. In his first season at the club he played 23 games as AEK finished third and also featured in four of the club's six UEFA Champions League matches. His performances with AEK gained the favour of the supporters, despite his red and white past. The following season, he scored six goals in six games but was unsettled at AEK in December 2003 he terminated his contract, paying his own release clause in order to return to Olympiacos.

=== Olympiacos ===
In January 2004 he signed for Olympiacos and his first season of his third spell, he helped them finish at second place. During his spell at the club he won another three Championships and two Cups. In 2006 Georgatos expressed his intention to end his career at Olympiacos when he signed a one-year contract until July 2007, retiring at the end of the season.

== International career ==
He first appeared for Greece in a Euro 1996 qualifier against San Marino in September 1995. He prematurely retired from international football in September 2001, following a reported dispute with coach Otto Rehhagel. Georgatos played 35 times and scored 3 goals in total for Greece.

== After football ==
After the end of his career, Georgatos initially enacted with the administration of Panachaki, while since 2013 he was one of the heads of the Olympiacos academies. From the summer of 2015 to the summer of 2016, he worked as the sports director of the Olympiacos with responsibility for the first team's competitive department.

== Style of play ==
Georgatos was known as an offensive fullback with an excellent crossing ability; his combative style at left back earned him the nickname, "the Greek Roberto Carlos."

== Career statistics ==
=== Club ===
Club performance			League		Cup		Continental		Total	
Season	Club	League	Apps	Goals	Apps	Goals	Apps	Goals	Apps	Goals
Greece			League		Greek Cup		Europe		Total	
1991–92	Panachaiki	Alpha Ethniki	30	4						
1992–93	Panachaiki	Alpha Ethniki	26	3						
1993–94	Panachaiki	Alpha Ethniki	28	5						
1994–95	Panachaiki	Beta Ethniki	26	7						
1995–96	Panachaiki	Alpha Ethniki	10	3						
1995–96	Olympiacos	Alpha Ethniki	17	2						
1996–97	Olympiacos	Alpha Ethniki	33	6	7	0	2	0	42	6
1997–98	Olympiacos	Alpha Ethniki	30	2	2	0	8	2	40	4
1998–99	Olympiacos	Alpha Ethniki	26	12	6	2	9	1	41	15
Italy			League		Coppa Italia		Europe		Total	
1999–2000	Internazionale	Serie A	28	2	6	1	-	-	34	3
Greece			League		Greek Cup		Europe		Total	
2000–01	Olympiacos	Alpha Ethniki	20	5	9	2	6	0	35	7
Italy			League		Coppa Italia		Europe		Total	
2001–02	Internazionale	Serie A	10	1	-	-	2	0	12	1
Greece			League		Greek Cup		Europe		Total	
2002–03	AEK Athens	Alpha Ethniki	23	2	7	0	8	1	38	3
2003–04	AEK Athens	Alpha Ethniki	6	5	0	0	3	0	9	5
2003–04	Olympiacos	Alpha Ethniki	13	1	5	2	0	0	18	3
2004–05	Olympiacos	Alpha Ethniki	25	3	7	1	8	0	40	4
2005–06	Olympiacos	Alpha Ethniki	22	1	3	0	3	0	28	1
2006–07	Olympiacos	Super League Greece	8	0	1	0	3	0	12	0
Country	Greece		343	61						
Country	Italy		38	3						
Total			381	64						

=== International ===
Greece national team
Year	Apps	Goals
1995	4	0
1996	0	0
1997	6	0
1998	5	0
1999	11	3
2000	7	0
2001	2	0
Total	35	3

== Honours ==
Olympiacos

- Alpha Ethniki/Super League Greece: 1996–97, 1997–98, 1998–99, 2000–01, 2004–05, 2005–06, 2006–07
- Greek Cup: 1998–99, 2004–05, 2005–06

Individual

- Greek Footballer of the Year: 1998–99
- Olympiacos Golden Eleven
