= Kleopas Giannou =

Greek footballer

Personal information
- Full name: Kleopas Giannou
- Date of birth: 4 May 1982 (age 44)
- Place of birth: Athens, Greece
- Height: 1.90 m (6 ft 3 in)
- Position: Goalkeeper

Youth career
- –1999: Olympiacos

Senior career*
Years	Team	Apps	(Gls)
1999–2007	Olympiacos	18	(0)
2006–2007	→ Egaleo (loan)	11	(0)
2007–2008	AEL Limassol	12	(0)
2008	Panionios	4	(0)
2008–2009	AEL Limassol	0	(0)
2013–2014	Nea Ionia	0	(0)

International career
2004	Greece Olympic	1	(0)
- * Club domestic league appearances and goals as of 10 September 2012

Kleopas Giannou (Greek: Κλέοπας Γιάννου; born 4 May 1982) is a Greek former professional footballer who played as a goalkeeper.

== Club career ==
A graduate of the Athenian club's youth system, Giannou was loaned to Olympiacos Volos in summer 2000 until the end of the year, and spent the rest the campaign at Halkidona FC. Promoted to the senior Olympiacos squad on his return, he made his top-flight debut on 4 January 2002, but was mainly a reserve. However, although by the start of 2003/04 he was still fourth-choice, a combination of Theofanis Katergiannakis's injury, Dimitrios Eleftheropoulos's departure and Juraj Bucek's loss of form saw Giannou promoted to play in the final 12 games of the league season.

Olympiacos, however, were pipped to the title by Panathinaikos. The arrival of Antonios Nikopolidis from Panathinaikos relegated Giannou back to the bench. He played in just one league match, when Nikopolidis was suspended, and three Greek Football Cup encounters as his club completed the domestic double. In 2005/06, understudy to Nikopolidis, he played in one league encounter and made his UEFA Champions League debut against Olympique Lyonnais.

He won approximately €1m in the Greek national lottery in 2002.

On 29 August 2007 Olympiacos decided to release Giannou from his contract after he refused to be loaned out again. He spent time on trial at Championship side Cardiff City but failed to earn a full contract. From August 2007 to January 2008 he was playing for AEL FC in Cyprus and since then he is currently playing in Panionios.

== International career ==
An Under-21 international, he was part of the Greek squad in the 2004 Olympic Games.

== Honours ==
=== Club ===
Olympiacos

- Greek Championship: 1999–2000, 2000–2001, 2001–2002, 2002–2003, 2004–2005, 2005–2006
- Greek Cup: 2004–2005, 2005–2006
