= Spyros Vallas =

Greek footballer

Personal information
- Full name: Spyridon Vallas
- Date of birth: 26 August 1981 (age 45)
- Place of birth: Elassona, Greece
- Height: 1.89 m (6 ft 2 1/2 in)
- Position: Centre back

Youth career
- –1999: Skoda Xanthi

Senior career*
Years	Team	Apps	(Gls)
1999–2003	Skoda Xanthi	54	(4)
2003–2007	Olympiacos	24	(3)
2006–2007	→ AEL (loan)	13	(0)
2007–2014	Skoda Xanthi	166	(5)

International career
2004	Greece Olympic	3	(0)
2001–2002	Greece	2	(0)
- * Club domestic league appearances and goals as of 3 March 2014

Spyros Vallas (Greek: Σπύρος Βάλλας; born 26 August 1981) is a Greek former professional footballer. Vallas, a defender, started his career at Skoda Xanthi, and transferred to Olympiacos in July 2003. He played for AEL on loan for one season, 2006–2007. He returned to his first team, Skoda Xanthi, in July 2007. He was Young Player of the year in the 2002 season. On 26 September 2014, he announced his decision to retire from professional football.

Vallas competed for the Greece Olympic team at the 2004 Summer Olympics.

== Honours ==
Olympiacos

- Greek Super League: (2) : 2004–05, 2005–06
- Greek Cup: (2) : 2004–05, 2005–06; Runner-up 2003–04

Larissa

- Greek Cup: (1) : 2006–07
