= Giannoulis Fakinos =

Greek footballer

Personal information
- Date of birth: 9 July 1989 (age 37)
- Place of birth: Naxos, Greece
- Height: 1.74 m (5 ft 9 in)
- Position: Midfielder

Youth career
- 2005–2006: Koronida Galatsiou

Senior career*
Years	Team	Apps	(Gls)
2006–2008	Olympiakos	0	(0)
2008–2009	Panionios	1	(0)
2009	Ilioupoli	11	(0)
2009–2011	Apollon Smyrnis	23	(0)
2011–2013	Ebbsfleet United	20	(0)
2013	Welling United	5	(0)
2013	Ebbsfleet United	0	(0)
2013	→ Margate (loan)	12	(1)
2014–2015	Cray Wanderers	51	(0)
2015–2016	VCD Athletic	1	(0)
2016–2017	Punjab United		

International career
2007	Greece U19	2	(0)
- * Club domestic league appearances and goals

Giannoulis Fakinos (Greek: Γιαννούλης Φακίνος; born 9 July 1989), also known as Yiannoulis Fakinos, is a Greek former professional footballer who played as a midfielder.

== Club career ==
Fakinos began his career at Koronida FC (Galatsi), before moving to play professionally for Olympiacos, Panionios, Ilioupoli and Apollon Smyrnis.

He is a midfielder who is suited into the central midfielder role, but can also play as a "holding role" as a defensive midfielder or an attacking midfielder. He is known for his quick acceleration and good passing ability.

In March 2011, Fakinos transferred to Ebbsfleet United in the Conference South and played a role in Ebbsfleet's promotion to the Conference National via the Play-offs.

On 1 March 2013, Fakinos joined Welling United in the Conference South.

In the summer of 2013 he once again joined Ebbsfleet United, after spending some time with Bromley in pre-season.

On 11 October 2013, Fakinos joined Margate on a two-month loan in the Isthmian League Premier Division. After his loan came to an end, he joined Isthmian League Premier Division strugglers Cray Wanderers. He made over 50 appearances in the 2014–15 season.

He began the 2015–16 season with VCD Athletic.
