= Athanasios Kostoulas =

Greek footballer (born 1976)

Personal information
- Date of birth: 24 March 1976 (age 50)
- Place of birth: Volos, Greece
- Height: 1.79 m (5 ft 10 in)
- Positions: Defender; defensive midfielder

Senior career*
Years	Team	Apps	(Gls)
1993–1994	Olympiacos Volos	27	(1)
1994–1999	Kalamata	134	(0)
1999–2007	Olympiacos	130	(1)
2007–2011	Skoda Xanthi	117	(0)
2011–2013	Asteras Tripolis	6	(0)
2013–2014	Olympiacos Volos	37	(2)
Total		451	(4)

International career
2001	Greece	2	(0)
- * Club domestic league appearances and goals as of 4 May 2014 (UTC)

Athanasios Kostoulas (Greek: Αθανάσιος "Θανάσης" Κωστούλας; born 24 March 1976) is a Greek former international footballer who played as a defender.

== Club career ==
Kostoulas stayed for a year at his first professional club, Olympiacos Volos, before moving to Kalamata for the in 1994. The highlight of his five seasons there, which reaped 135 league appearances, was the club's promotion to the Alpha Ethniki in 1995. In July 1999, he joined Olympiacos and ended each of his first three terms with a Greek championship medal. He started the following season on the bench but when handed an opportunity he took it, playing in seven out of the final eight games and excelling in the derby defeat of Panathinaikos which paved the way for another championship success. He remained a consistent performer when used as the title was lost in 2004 and then won back in each of the next two seasons along with the Greek Cup.

In January 2007, he moved to Skoda Xanthi and in summer 2011 to Asteras Tripolis. In the summer of 2013 Kostoulas returned to finish his career in his first professional club, Olympiacos Volos.

== International career ==
Kostoulas was a member of the Greece side reached the 1998 UEFA European Under-21 Championship final, losing 1–0 to Spain. He was then elevated into the senior fold, making his debut in a 4–2 FIFA World Cup qualifying defeat by Germany on 28 March 2001 but did not figure again after a second cap a month later against Croatia.

== Personal life ==
Kostoulas is the father of Charalampos Kostoulas and Konstantinos Kostoulas who are also both professional footballers.

== Honours ==
=== Club ===
Olympiacos

- Super League Greece: 1999–2000, 2000–01, 2001–02, 2002–03, 2004–05, 2005–06, 2006–07
- Greek Cup: 2004–05, 2005–06

=== International ===
Greece

- UEFA Euro U21: Runner-up 1998
