= Georgios Abaris =

Greek footballer (born 1982)

Personal information
- Full name: Georgios Abaris
- Date of birth: 23 April 1982 (age 44)
- Place of birth: Naousa, Greece
- Height: 1.86 m (6 ft 1 in)
- Position: Goalkeeper

Youth career
- Achilleas Naousa

Senior career*
Years	Team	Apps	(Gls)
2001–2007	Iraklis	98	(0)
2007–2010	Asteras Tripolis	50	(0)
2010–2011	AEL	16	(0)
2012–2013	Universitatea Cluj	1	(0)
2013–2014	PAS Giannina	1	(0)
2014–2016	Enosis Neon Paralimni	40	(0)
2017–2018	Iraklis	2	(0)

International career^{‡}
2003	Greece U21	7	(0)
2004	Greece Olympic	2	(0)
- * Club domestic league appearances and goals as of 20 May 2018 ‡ National team caps and goals as of 20:25, 12 December 2015 (UTC)

Georgios Abaris (Greek: Γεώργιος Αμπάρης; born 23 April 1982) is a Greek former professional footballer who played as a goalkeeper.

== Club career ==
Abaris previously played in the Super League Greece with Iraklis, AEL and Asteras Tripolis.

== International career ==
Abaris competed for the Greece U21 for the 2003 UEFA European Under-21 Championship qualification and for the U23 at the 2004 Summer Olympics.
