= Nery Castillo =

Mexican footballer (born 1984)

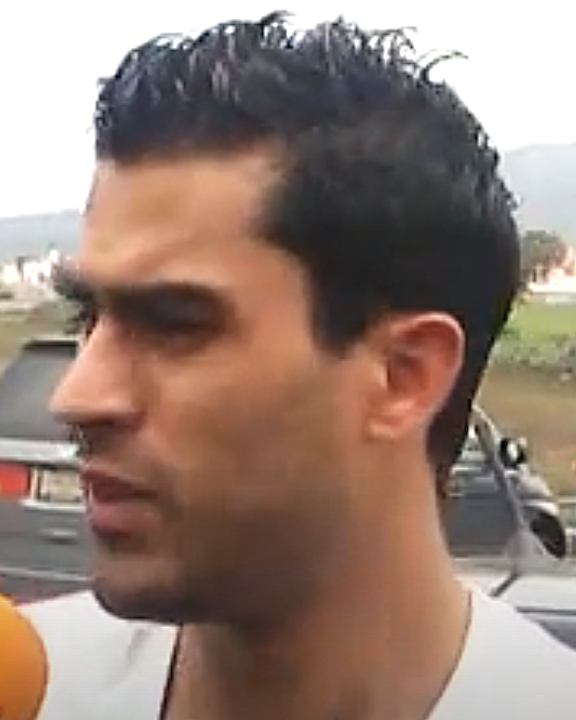
- Castillo in 2012

Personal information
- Full name: Nery Alberto Castillo Confalonieri
- Date of birth: 13 June 1984 (age 42)
- Place of birth: San Luis Potosí, Mexico
- Height: 1.70 m (5 ft 7 in)
- Position: Forward

Youth career
- 1999–2000: Danubio

Senior career*
Years	Team	Apps	(Gls)
2000–2007	Olympiacos	105	(30)
2007–2011	Shakhtar Donetsk	12	(1)
2008–2009	→ Manchester City (loan)	7	(0)
2009–2010	→ Dnipro (loan)	3	(0)
2010	→ Chicago Fire (loan)	8	(0)
2011	→ Aris (loan)	10	(2)
2011–2012	Aris	20	(6)
2012–2013	Pachuca	13	(1)
2013	→ León (loan)	7	(0)
2013–2014	Rayo Vallecano	11	(2)
Total		196	(42)

International career^{‡}
2007–2009	Mexico	21	(6)
Medal record
Representing Mexico
Runner-up	CONCACAF Gold Cup	2007
Third place	Copa América	2007
- * Club domestic league appearances and goals as of 6 January 2014 ‡ National team caps and goals as of 9 September 2009

Nery Alberto Castillo Confalonieri (born 13 June 1984) is a Mexican former professional footballer who played as a forward.

== Early years ==
Nery Castillo was born in San Luis Potosí, Mexico, where his father, a Uruguayan professional footballer, had played for the local team of San Luis. He is also of Italian descent.

The family moved to South America while Castillo was still a small child. He started playing for Uruguayan side Danubio's youth team. While playing in a Brazilian tournament, Castillo was spotted by scouts from European clubs. He went on to trials with Manchester United, but failed to obtain a work permit and the transfer did not materialise.

== Club career ==
=== Olympiacos ===
At the age of 16, Castillo's father and agent accepted an offer from the Greek club Olympiacos. Three years after he joined Olympiacos, Castillo became a regular starter in both domestic and European competitions. He became a fan favourite with the Gate 7 Ultras and was even given the number 7 shirt in deference to them. Castillo was part of the Olympiacos squad that won the next three consecutive league titles. He was the club's leading scorer during the preparatory phase for the 2006–07 season, accumulating seven goals in friendly games. He finished the season second to Rivaldo in goals scored and assists for the club, with three goals scored in five Champions League games.

In early 2006, his father and agent began negotiations with Mexican club Guadalajara, but talks were suspended because Olympiacos weren't interested in selling the player at the time.

Subsequently, in 2007, Olympiacos accepted Ukrainian club Shakhtar Donetsk's offer of €20 million for Castillo's services. Castillo therefore, did not want to leave the club as he was satisfied. He did this, after big pressure from president's son Petros Kokkalis due to the large offer. Before this, in what Castillo correctly anticipated would be his last game for Olympiacos, he scored with a free kick shot, after "stealing" the kick from the teammate who was preparing to take it.

=== Shakhtar Donetsk ===
On 31 July 2007, Castillo joined Ukrainian side Shakhtar Donetsk on a five-year contract for a fee of €20 million. This became the most expensive transfer for a Ukrainian club to date.

Castillo scored his first goal for Shakhtar while playing against SV Salzburg in the Champions League. He had only played in a few games for Shakhtar when, in a league match versus FC Naftovyk-Ukrnafta Okhtyrka, Shakhtar won a penalty kick. Castillo refused to give the ball to designated penalty kick-taker Cristiano Lucarelli and took the penalty himself, which was saved by the goalkeeper. Castillo was immediately substituted from the game. Coach Mircea Lucescu commented "What Castillo did, from a professional point of view, I've never seen anything like it before in my whole life. There will be some measures taken against Castillo".

==== Manchester City (loan) ====
On 18 December 2007, it was announced that Castillo had signed a one-year loan agreement with Manchester City, commencing on 1 January 2008. Reportedly Castillo was keen to make the move happen and, in a highly unusual move, paid half of the loan fee himself. Sven-Göran Eriksson commented "He was desperate to come to us, desperate to come to England, desperate to come to the Premier League", and said he had never seen a player pay for half the transfer deal himself before.

Castillo played his first game for Manchester City on 5 January 2008 in the third round of the FA Cup, away to West Ham United. However, in the replay on 16 January 2008, his first home appearance for the club, he was stretchered off after 32 minutes with a broken shoulder.

He ended the season with nine appearances, seven of them coming in the Premier League. Failing to secure a place at Manchester City, Castillo returned to Shakhtar Donetsk at the end of his loan in January 2009.

==== Dnipro Dnipropetrovsk (loan) ====
After Shakhtar Donetsk had failed to even include Castillo on the bench for the first two matches of the 2009/2010 season he was loaned to Ukrainian league rivals Dnipro Dnipropetrovsk for a year on 30 July 2009.

==== Chicago Fire (loan) ====
On 17 July 2010, the Chicago Fire announced the signing of Castillo as their newest Designated Player. He arrived on loan with Chicago holding the option to make the transfer from Shakhtar Donetsk permanent. In being signed as a designated player, he became the second youngest designated player in Major League Soccer history.

=== Aris ===
Castillo joined Aris on a six-month loan on 19 January 2011. He played his first game for Aris on 30 January 2011, against local rivals PAOK.

Castillo terminated his contract with Shakhtar Donetsk and signed a two-year contract with Aris on 1 July 2011.

He scored his first league goal for Aris of the 2011/12 season on 8 January 2012 in a 1–0 win over PAS Giannina. He scored his first brace in a 3–1 victory over Doxa Drama on 22 January. He scored his second consecutive brace seven days later in a 2–1 win over Levadiakos. Castillo scored again on 5 February in a 2–0 win over Xanthi, bringing his goal tally to six.

=== Pachuca ===
On 14 June 2012, Castillo joined Liga MX club Pachuca on a three-year contract.

==== León (loan) ====
On 10 December 2012, Castillo was loaned to Club León for six months, for whom he made seven appearances in total.

=== Rayo Vallecano ===
On 9 July 2013, Castillo joined Spanish club Rayo Vallecano on a free transfer.

== International career ==
=== Choosing nationality ===
Castillo was eligible for citizenship in four countries; Uruguay because his father is from there; Italy due to his maternal grandparents; Greece because he resided there for more than six years and Mexico where he was born.

His first experience of international football came when he was called up to a Uruguay U-17 training camp. However, he was released after playing a few friendly games. Next the Greek coach Otto Rehhagel tried to secure his services for the Greece national football team. Greece were reportedly willing to pay Castillo $800,000, including fast-tracked citizenship as part of the offer.

Ultimately, Castillo decided to play for the country of his birth and joined the Mexico national football team.

=== Mexico national team ===
He made his international debut for Mexico on 2 June 2007 vs Iran, in his hometown San Luis Potosí with Mexico winning the game 4–0, and went on to represent his country in the 2007 CONCACAF Gold Cup, where he scored his first international goal against Cuba, and in the 2007 Copa America.

In the 2007 Copa America, a pre-tournament injury to Jared Borgetti gave Castillo a starting berth, and he scored l in Mexico's first match of the tournament, a 2–0 win against Brazil.

He scored again against Ecuador, as Mexico secured a place in the knockout stages, and scored a brace in the quarter-final against Paraguay, the first goal from the penalty spot. Overall, Castillo was the third highest goal scorer of the tournament with four goals, behind Juan Román Riquelme and Robinho.

== Relationship with the Mexican media ==
During a press conference on 25 March 2009 that was held after a training session for the national team ahead of a match against Costa Rica, Nery Castillo clashed with Mexican reporters, who were questioning his fitness and discipline following his late arrival at the camp. After a heating exchange, he finally responds and ended the exchange by saying: “La diferencia es que yo estoy en Europa y tú estás en México, y siempre te vas a quedar en México.” (“The difference is that I am in Europe and you are in Mexico, and you will always remain in Mexico.”)

== After retirement ==
Following his retirement from football, he dedicated himself to selling fishing equipment and gear in Athens, Greece.

== Career statistics ==
=== Club ===
As of 20 July 2015

Club	Season	League			Cup		Continental		Total	
Club	Season	Division	Apps	Goals	Apps	Goals	Apps	Goals	Apps	Goals
Olympiacos	2000–01	Alpha Ethniki	1	0	3	1	—		4	1
Olympiacos	2001–02	Alpha Ethniki	1	0	7	1	—		8	1
Olympiacos	2002–03	Alpha Ethniki	9	3	7	1	—		16	4
Olympiacos	2003–04	Alpha Ethniki	26	7	8	2	5	2	39	11
Olympiacos	2004–05	Alpha Ethniki	26	6	4	1	5	0	35	7
Olympiacos	2005–06	Alpha Ethniki	17	2	5	2	—		22	4
Olympiacos	2006–07	Super League Greece	25	12	5	0	5	3	35	15
Shakhtar Donetsk	2007–08	Vyshcha Liha	8	0	1	0	5	1	14	1
Manchester City	2007–08	Premier League	7	0	2	0	—		9	0
Shakhtar	2008–09	Ukrainian Premier League	4	1	—		—		4	1
Dnipro	2008–09	Ukrainian Premier League	3	0	—		—		3	0
Chicago Fire	2010	Major League Soccer	8	0	—		—		8	0
Aris	2010–11	Super League Greece	10	2	—		1	0	11	2
Aris	2011–12	Super League Greece	20	6	1	1	—		21	7
Pachuca	2012–13	Liga MX	13	1	2	0	—		15	1
León	2012–13	Liga MX	7	0	—		2	0	9	0
Rayo Vallecano	2013–14	La Liga	11	2	4	0	—		15	2
Total			196	42	49	9	23	6	268	57

=== International ===
As of match played 6 September 2009

National team	Year	Apps	Goals
Mexico	2007	12	5
Mexico	2008	3	0
Mexico	2009	6	1
Total		21	6

=== International goals ===
International goals
No.	Date	Venue	Opponent	Score	Result	Competition
1	8 June 2007	Giants Stadium, East Rutherford, United States	Cuba	2–1	2–1	2007 CONCACAF Gold Cup
2	27 June 2007	Polideportivo Cachamay, Puerto Ordaz, Venezuela	Brazil	1–0	2–0	2007 Copa América
3	1 July 2007	Estadio Monumental de Maturín, Maturín, Venezuela	Ecuador	1–0	2–1	2007 Copa América
4	8 July 2007	Estadio Monumental de Maturín, Maturín, Venezuela	Paraguay	1–0	6–0	2007 Copa América
5	8 July 2007	Estadio Monumental de Maturín, Maturín, Venezuela	Paraguay	3–0	6–0	2007 Copa América
6	1 April 2009	Estadio Olímpico Metropolitano, San Pedro Sula, Honduras	Honduras	1–3	1–3	2010 FIFA World Cup qualification

== Honours ==
Olympiacos

- Super League Greece: 2000–01, 2001–02, 2002–03, 2004–05, 2005–06, 2006–07
- Greek Cup: 2004–05, 2005–06

Shakhtar Donetsk

- UEFA Cup: 2008–09

Individual

- Copa América Team of the Tournament: 2007
