= Pantelis Kafes =

Greek footballer (born 1978)

Personal information
- Full name: Panteleimon Kafes
- Date of birth: 24 June 1978 (age 48)
- Place of birth: Veria, Greece
- Height: 1.80 m (5 ft 11 in)
- Position: Central midfielder

Youth career
- 1992–1995: Pontioi Veria

Senior career*
Years	Team	Apps	(Gls)
1995–1997	Pontioi Veria	51	(7)
1997–2003	PAOK	146	(29)
2003–2007	Olympiacos	81	(8)
2007–2012	AEK Athens	138	(16)
2012–2013	Veria	14	(1)
Total		430	(61)

International career
1994–2000	Greece U21	17	(3)
2001–2011	Greece	40	(3)
Medal record
Men's football
Representing Greece
UEFA European Championship
Winner	2004
- * Club domestic league appearances and goals

Pantelis Kafes (Greek: Παντελής Καφές; born 24 June 1978) is a Greek former professional footballer who played as a midfielder. Due to his follow to the example of Osvaldo Ardiles, he was known for being one of very few outfield players to have worn the number 1 jersey and has won acclaim for his creative abilities and passing skills.

== Club career ==
=== Pontioi Veria ===
He started playing professional football in January 1995 at the age of 17 for Pontioi Veria. The club were relegated to the third division that summer and the following May were demoted again. The one shining light was Kafes, who joined PAOK in January 1997.

=== PAOK ===
Kafes burst on to the Alpha Ethniki scene in 1998–99, scoring seven times. He continued to impress and was instrumental in PAOK's 2000–01 and 2002–03 Greek Cup triumphs. Yet his spell in Thessaloniki ended acrimoniously as he was released from his contract after a dispute over unpaid wages. Olympiacos stepped in with a three-year contract.

=== Olympiacos ===
He was ever-present in his first season at Olympiacos as they finished second in the Alpha Ethniki in 2003, and made his first UEFA Champions League appearances, five in all. Kafes played in the majority of Olympiacos' league matches on their way to the domestic double, and only a mid-season injury preventing him from matching his record in Europe, where he took part in all of the club's Champions League and UEFA Cup games. Likewise for next season, 2005–2006, where he played 22 domestic league games, earned another double and scored two truly memorable tying goals from the edge of the box for Olympiacos in the UEFA Champions League against Real Madrid. the goal of Raul at the Estadio Santiago Bernabéu. On 19 October 2005, he scored also against Olympique Lyonnais. Kafes was released from Olympiacos during 2006–07 season. A few days later he signed a 2-year contract with rival side AEK Athens.

=== AEK Athens ===
Soon after signing for AEK and continuing his tradition of wearing the number 1, Kafes broke into the first team and was a mainstay in AEK's fight for the championship, but they had to settle for second. The following season on 12 January 2008, Kafes scored his first goal for AEK against Veria. On 30 March of the same year, Kafes scored against his former club, Olympiacos and put AEK 4–0 in front. AEK initially finished in first place in the Greek League, but after the court case between Apollon Kalamaria and Olympiacos for the illegal usage of a player (Roman Wallner) in the 1–0 Apollon Kalamaria win earlier in the season, Olympiacos were awarded the 3 points in a court hearing, thus finishing 2 points ahead of AEK Olympiacos. In his third season with the "Dikefalos-Aetos", AEK did not live up to their expectations and finished third, Kafes was a key figure in there revival inwich he captained the side on a few occasions. On 12 June 2009, Kafes signed a new 3-year deal which will keep him at AEK until 2012. He agreed to reduce his wages to help the club's financial difficulties. On 11 July 2009, Kafes was given the captain's armband and will be the new captain for the upcoming season. On 13 September 2009, Kafes scored his first goal of the season against Iraklis. Kafes also scored 2 goals against PAS Giannina. He has made great appearances throughout the 2009–10 season, with much silent work as a defensive midfielder and some great assists to his teammates. On 30 April 2011, Kafes won the 2010–11 Greek Football Cup and scored AEK's third goal in a 3–0 win against Atromitos. Kafes scored his first goal in the 2011–12 season against Panionios in a 1–0 home win on 5 February 2012. The season was his last with AEK.

=== Veria ===
Pantelis Kafes left AEK in June. He trialed with Rangers F.C. in Scotland but did not sign with the financially troubled club. After being free agent for 2 months, on 31 August he joined back to his hometown team Veria FC. He scored his first goal with his new team 6 October 2012 against Atromitos and on 12 December 2012, he made his debut in Greek Cup with Veria FC against Thrasyvoulos and 22 December, he helped his new team to qualify for the stage and for the quarter-final of the Greek Cup. He was released during the winter break and in February 2013, he trialed with Philadelphia Union of Major League Soccer.

== International career ==
Kafes made his debut with Greece against Croatia in April 2001 and scored his first goal against Austria in Vienna in March 2003. Kafes made two appearances in UEFA EURO 2004 qualifying, and was in the finals squad and he won Euro 2004 with Greece. Kafes participated in 2006 World Cup qualifying campaign, the 2005 FIFA Confederations Cup. Kafes has been re-called into the team from the new coach Fernando Santos during the qualification for Euro 2012. On 8 October 2010 Kafes came on as a substitute against Latvia replacing Giorgos Karagounis, helping the team to qualify for UEFA's 2012 European Football Championship tournament. This was Kafes' first competitive match under new coach Fernando Santos. On 17 November 2010, Kafes played also the second half of the friendly match against Austria, giving a big contribution, where Greece beat Austria.

== Career statistics ==
=== Club ===
Appearances and goals by club, season and competition
Club	Season	League			Greek Cup		Europe		Total	
Club	Season	Division	Apps	Goals	Apps	Goals	Apps	Goals	Apps	Goals
ΑΕP Verias	1994–95	Beta Ethniki	15	2	1	0	0	0	16	2
ΑΕP Verias	1995–96	Gamma Ethniki	28	5	0	0	0	0	28	5
ΑΕP Verias	1996–97	Gamma Ethniki	8	0	0	0	0	0	8	0
PAOK	1996–97	Alpha Ethniki	4	0	0	0	0	0	4	0
PAOK	1997–98	Alpha Ethniki	14	2	1	0	0	0	15	2
PAOK	1998–99	Alpha Ethniki	27	7	2	1	0	0	29	8
PAOK	1999–00	Alpha Ethniki	26	4	2	0	2	0	30	4
PAOK	2000–01	Alpha Ethniki	27	4	12	2	6	0	45	6
PAOK	2001–02	Alpha Ethniki	23	4	7	3	6	1	36	8
PAOK	2002–03	Alpha Ethniki	25	8	7	1	5	0	37	9
Olympiacos	2003–04	Alpha Ethniki	30	4	7	1	5	0	42	5
Olympiacos	2004–05	Alpha Ethniki	21	2	5	1	10	0	36	3
Olympiacos	2005–06	Alpha Ethniki	22	2	5	0	6	2	33	4
Olympiacos	2006–07	Super League Greece	8	0	2	0	3	0	13	0
AEK Athens	2006–07	Super League Greece	7	1	0	0	2	0	9	1
AEK Athens	2007–08	Super League Greece	25	3	2	0	8	0	35	3
AEK Athens	2008–09	Super League Greece	27	3	5	1	3	0	35	4
AEK Athens	2009–10	Super League Greece	29	5	0	0	7	0	36	5
AEK Athens	2010–11	Super League Greece	24	3	4	1	7	1	35	5
AEK Athens	2011–12	Super League Greece	26	1	1	0	3	0	30	1
Veria	2012–13	Super League Greece	14	1	2	0	0	0	16	1
Career total			430	61	65	11	73	4	568	76

=== International ===
Appearances and goals by national team and year
National team	Year	Apps	Goals
Greece	2001	3	0
Greece	2002	8	0
Greece	2003	5	2
Greece	2004	5	0
Greece	2005	6	1
Greece	2006	3	0
Greece	2007	0	0
Greece	2008	1	0
Greece	2009	4	0
Greece	2010	6	0
Total		41	3

Scores and results list Greece's goal tally first, score column indicates score after each Kafes goal.

List of international goals scored by Pantelis Kafes
No.	Date	Venue	Opponent	Score	Result	Competition
1	2003-03-26	UPC-Arena, Graz, Austria	Austria	2–1	2–2	Friendly
2	2003-08-20	Norrköpings Idrottspark, Norrköping, Sweden	Sweden	2–1	2–1	Friendly
3	2005-11-16	Karaiskakis Stadium, Piraeus, Greece	Hungary	2–1	2–1	Friendly

== Honours ==
PAOK

- Greek Cup (2): 2001, 2003

Olympiacos

- Super League Greece (3): 2005, 2006, 2007
- Greek Cup (2): 2005, 2006

AEK Athens

- Greek Cup: 2011

Greece

- UEFA European Championship: 2004
