= Michalis Konstantinou =

Cypriot footballer

Personal information
- Full name: Michalis Konstantinou
- Date of birth: 19 February 1978 (age 48)
- Place of birth: Deryneia, Cyprus
- Height: 1.88 m (6 ft 2 in)
- Position: Striker

Youth career
- Paralimni

Senior career*
Years	Team	Apps	(Gls)
1993–1997	Paralimni	68	(31)
1997–2001	Iraklis	119	(60)
2001-2005	Panathinaikos	94	(34)
2005–2008	Olympiacos	57	(17)
2008–2009	Iraklis	13	(3)
2009–2011	Omonia	59	(34)
2011–2012	Anorthosis Famagusta	15	(3)
2012–2013	AEL Limassol	19	(6)
Total		444	(188)

International career
1997–2012	Cyprus	84	(32)
- * Club domestic league appearances and goals

Michalis Konstantinou (Greek: Μιχάλης Κωνσταντίνου; born 19 February 1978) is a Cypriot former professional footballer who played as a striker. He played for the Cyprus national team, and he is their all-time leading scorer with 32 goals in 84 appearances. He also played for Iraklis, Panathinaikos and Olympiacos in Greece.

== Club career ==
=== Early ===
Born in Paralimni, he got his start in professional football playing for hometown side Enosis Neon Paralimni, for whom he scored 17 goals in 25 games in the 1996/97 season and became top goal scorer of Cypriot Championship.

=== Iraklis ===
He was signed by Iraklis in 1997. In his four seasons he scored a total of 61 goals in 119 appearances and he also played in the UEFA Cup.

=== Panathinaikos ===
In 2001, in a deal which took three Panathinaikos players to Iraklis, Konstantinou was transferred to Panathinaikos for €8 million. It was a successful purchase, but many believed that the young Cypriot striker was worth less than the expenditure of €8million made by Panathinaikos – the highest figure ever paid for a player in the Greek Super League. With Panathinaikos, he had the opportunity to play in the Champions League, earning praise for his performances in attack. There he found with the Portuguese players Paulo Sousa and later Robert Jarni, taking Panathinakos a long way in the competition. He scored a beautiful 45m goal in the Camp Nou return in the quarter-final against Barcelona in the 2001–02 Champions League. Panathinaikos seemed to ensure its marking the semi-finals, as they were needed 3 goals to go to the Spaniards. Barça, however, came back and won 3–1, qualifying for the semi-finals.

In 2004–05 he had 15 goals. Konstantinou scored against the champions in a 1–0 home win, at the end of the season Konstantinou did not renew with Panathinaikos, because he stated that he was going to continue his footballing career in a league of higher value to gain better experience.

That summer though, he was not signed by a club overseas and was signed by Olympiacos.

=== Olympiacos ===
As an Olympiacos player he won with his team the double for 2005/06 and made it two in his career. At the Greek Cup final in 2005/06, where Olympiacos defeated AEK Athens by 3–0, Konstantinou scored Olympiacos' first goal. He also notably scored a late strike to make it 1–2 in the early season league victory of Olympiacos against AEK Athens (final score 1–3) and a crowd-pleaser against his former team, Panathinaikos, to make it 3–1 (match ended 3–2). He became for the second consecutive time champion again with Olympiakos in 2007, even though the season was full of personal injuries and bad luck, he still managed to perform well on some important matches, most notably scoring on the away Champions League match at Shakhtar Donetsk. During the 2007–2008 season, he has suffered from injuries and has lost his starting position to Darko Kovačević. It was the last season at Olympiacos.

=== Return to Iraklis ===
Konstantinou started the 2008–09 season in Greece at Iraklis There he played 13 matches of which he scored three goals.

=== Omonia ===
Halfway through the 2008–2009 season, Konstantinou was transferred to Cyprus to play for Omonia. During the 2009–2010 season, he scored several goals for the club, including in derbies against rivals APOEL, Anorthosis, and Apollon Limassol. After taking a leadership and mentor role with the team in his first full season in 2010, Konstantinou helped Omonoia to win its 20th Cypriot Championship after reuniting with Takis Lemonis, who was also his coach at Olympiacos.

=== Anorthosis Famagusta ===
In Summer 2011, Konstantinou signed a contract with Anorthosis Famagusta.

=== AEL Limassol ===
In Summer 2012, Konstantinou signed a one-year contract with AEL Limassol.

=== Retirement ===
In January 2014, he announced his retirement from football as a player.

== International career ==
Konstantinou made his international debut against Latvia in February 1997 and subsequently averaged almost a goal every other game in his first 35 caps. His first two goals came 10 February 1999 against San Marino at Tsirion Stadium (final score 4–0).

=== International goals ===
List of international goals scored by Michalis Konstantinou
No.	Date	Venue	Opponent	Score	Result	Competition
1	10 February 1999	Tsirion Stadium, Limassol, Cyprus	San Marino	2–0	4–0	UEFA Euro 2000 qualifying
2	10 February 1999	Tsirion Stadium, Limassol, Cyprus	San Marino	3–0	4–0	UEFA Euro 2000 qualifying
3	2 February 2000	Tsirion Stadium, Limassol, Cyprus	Lithuania	1–0	2–1	2000 Cyprus International Tournament
4	2 February 2000	Tsirion Stadium, Limassol, Cyprus	Lithuania	2–1	2–1	2000 Cyprus International Tournament
5	2 September 2000	Estadi Comunal d'Andorra la Vella, Andorra la Vella, Andorra	Andorra	0–1	2–3	2002 FIFA World Cup qualification
6	2 September 2000	Estadi Comunal d'Andorra la Vella, Andorra la Vella, Andorra	Andorra	2–3	2–3	2002 FIFA World Cup qualification
7	28 March 2001	Tsirion Stadium, Limassol, Cyprus	Estonia	1–0	2–2	2002 FIFA World Cup qualification
8	15 August 2001	A. Le Coq Arena, Tallinn, Estonia	Estonia	0–1	2–2	2002 FIFA World Cup qualification
9	15 August 2001	A. Le Coq Arena, Tallinn, Estonia	Estonia	1–2	2–2	2002 FIFA World Cup qualification
10	5 September 2001	Antonis Papadopoulos Stadium, Larnaca, Cyprus	Portugal	1–0	1–3	2002 FIFA World Cup qualification
11	12 February 2002	GSP Stadium, Nicosia, Cyprus	Switzerland	1–0	1–1	2002 Cyprus International Tournament
12	13 February 2002	GSP Stadium, Nicosia, Cyprus	Czech Republic	3–3	3–4	2002 Cyprus International Tournament
13	29 January 2003	GSZ Stadium, Larnaca, Cyprus	Greece	1–0	1–2	Friendly
14	2 April 2003	Bežigrad Stadium, Ljubljana, Slovenia	Slovenia	1–1	4–1	UEFA Euro 2004 qualifying
15	7 June 2003	Ta' Qali National Stadium, Ta' Qali, Malta	Malta	0–1	1–2	UEFA Euro 2004 qualifying
16	7 June 2003	Ta' Qali National Stadium, Ta' Qali, Malta	Malta	0–2	1–2	UEFA Euro 2004 qualifying
17	18 August 2004	GSP Stadium, Nicosia, Cyprus	Albania	1–0	2–1	Friendly
18	18 August 2004	GSP Stadium, Nicosia, Cyprus	Albania	2–0	2–1	Friendly
19	8 September 2004	Ramat Gan Stadium, Ramat Gan, Israel	Israel	0–1	2–1	2006 FIFA World Cup qualification
20	9 October 2004	GSP Stadium, Nicosia, Cyprus	Faroe Islands	1–0	2–2	2006 FIFA World Cup qualification
21	17 August 2005	Svangaskarð, Toftir, Faroe Islands	Faroe Islands	0–1	0–3	2006 FIFA World Cup qualification
22	17 August 2005	Svangaskarð, Toftir, Faroe Islands	Faroe Islands	0–2	0–3	2006 FIFA World Cup qualification
23	7 October 2006	GSP Stadium, Nicosia, Cyprus	Republic of Ireland	1–1	5–2	UEFA Euro 2008 qualifying
24	7 October 2006	GSP Stadium, Nicosia, Cyprus	Republic of Ireland	3–2	5–2	UEFA Euro 2008 qualifying
25	8 September 2007	Dasaki Stadium, Achna, Cyprus	Armenia	3–1	3–1	Friendly
26	11 October 2008	Boris Paichadze Stadium, Tbilisi, Georgia	Georgia	0–1	1–1	2010 FIFA World Cup qualification
27	28 March 2009	Antonis Papadopoulos Stadium, Larnaca, Cyprus	Georgia	1–0	2–1	2010 FIFA World Cup qualification
28	6 June 2009	Antonis Papadopoulos Stadium, Larnaca, Cyprus	Montenegro	1–0	2–2	2010 FIFA World Cup qualification
29	10 October 2009	Antonis Papadopoulos Stadium, Larnaca, Cyprus	Bulgaria	3–1	4–1	2010 FIFA World Cup qualification
30	11 August 2010	Antonis Papadopoulos Stadium, Larnaca, Cyprus	Andorra	1–0	1–0	Friendly
31	3 September 2010	Estádio D. Afonso Henriques, Guimarães, Portugal	Portugal	1–2	4–4	UEFA Euro 2012 qualifying
32	9 February 2011	Paralimni Stadium, Paralimni, Cyprus	Romania	1–1	1–1	2011 Cyprus International Tournament

== Honours ==
=== Club ===
Panathinaikos

- Super League Greece: 2003–04
- Greek Cup: 2003–04

Olympiacos

- Super League Greece: 2005–06, 2006–07, 2007–08
- Greek Cup: 2005–06, 2007–08
- Greek Super Cup: 2007

Omonia

- Cypriot First Division: 2009–10
- Cypriot Cup: 2010–11
- Cypriot Super Cup: 2010

=== Individual ===
- Cypriot First Division Top scorer: 1996–97
- Greek Cup MVP: 2003–04, 2005–06

== See also ==
- List of top international men's football goalscorers by country
