= Juraj Buček =

Slovak footballer

Personal information
- Full name: Juraj Buček
- Date of birth: 15 September 1973 (age 53)
- Place of birth: Humenné, Czechoslovakia
- Height: 2.04 m (6 ft 8 in)
- Position: Goalkeeper

Senior career*
Years	Team	Apps	(Gls)
1995–1997	Chemlon Humenné	42	(0)
1997–2003	Skoda Xanthi	165	(0)
2003–2005	Olympiacos	4	(0)
2005–2006	Aris	28	(0)
Total		239	(0)

International career
2000–2003	Slovakia	11	(0)
- * Club domestic league appearances and goals

Juraj Buček (born 15 September 1973 in Humenné) is a former Slovak football goalkeeper who played for several clubs in Europe.

== Club career ==
Buček began his professional football career with Chemlon Humenné in the Slovak Superliga. He had a spell in the Super League Greece with Skoda Xanthi and Olympiacos F.C.
