= Dimitrios Mavrogenidis =

Greek footballer

Personal information
- Full name: Dimitrios Mavrogenidis
- Date of birth: 23 December 1976 (age 49)
- Place of birth: Tashkent, Uzbekistan
- Height: 1.80 m (5 ft 11 in)
- Position: Right-back

Youth career
- Aris

Senior career*
| Years | Team | Apps | (Gls) |
| 1994–1997 | Aris | 83 | (12) |
| 1997–2006 | Olympiacos | 201 | (10) |
| 2006–2008 | Iraklis | 46 | (0) |
| 2008–2009 | Thrasyvoulos | 21 | (0) |

International career^{‡}
| 1998–2001 | Greece | 24 | (1) |

Managerial career
- 2014–2025: Olympiacos U20
- * Club domestic league appearances and goals as of 15 July 2009 ‡ National team caps and goals as of 15 July 2009

Dimitrios Mavrogenidis (Greek: Δημήτριος Μαυρογενίδης; born 23 December 1976) is a retired Greek football right-back.

Mavrogenidis is best known as Olympiacos' first-choice right-back for a long stretch of the club's dominance of Greek football in the late 1990s and early 2000s.

== Club career ==
=== Aris ===
After coming through Aris' youth system, Mavrogenidis made his professional debut at age 17, on 9 August 1994, in the preliminary round of the 1994–95 UEFA Cup (now called UEFA Europa League), in a 3–1 win over to Hapoel Be'er Sheva.

After three seasons with Aris, making 103 appearances and scoring 15 goals in all competitions, Mavrogenidis transferred to Olympiacos.

=== Olympiacos ===
Upon arriving from Aris, Mavrogenidis established himself as Olympiacos' first-choice right-back for the next nine seasons, during which time Olympiakos dominated Greek football.

==== Domestic competition ====
In nine seasons with Olympiacos, from 1997–98 through 2005–06, Mavrogenidis won eight league championships and three Greek Cups, making 201 league appearances (172 starts) and 56 Cup appearances (50 starts).

==== European competition ====
During his career with Olympiacos, Mavrogenidis made 40 total appearances (35 starts) in the UEFA Champions League and 8 total appearances (8 starts) in the UEFA Cup.

Mavrogenidis played in Champions League matches against some of Europe's most important clubs, including Real Madrid (six times) and Juventus (four times).

During Olympiacos' best-ever run in the Champions League—to the quarter-finals in 1998–99, where they were eliminated by Juventus, 3–2 on aggregate—Mavrogenidis played every minute of Olympiacos' eight total matches in the group stage and quarter-final stage.

Mavrogenidis scored three goals in Champions League competition—against Rosenborg in 1997–98, against Molde in 1999–00, and against Galatasaray in 2003–04.

=== Iraklis ===
After leaving Olympiacos in 2006, Mavrogenidis returned to Thessaloniki to sign for another important Greek club Iraklis.

Mavrogenidis spent two seasons with Iraklis, making 46 total league appearances (40 starts).

Mavrogenidis also made two European appearances with Iraklis—the Thessaloniki club qualified for the 2006–07 UEFA Cup, but was eliminated in the first round of the competition by Wisła Kraków, 2–1 on aggregate after extra time.

=== Thrasyvoulos ===
After leaving Iraklis in 2008, Mavrogenidis signed with newly promoted Greek Super League side Thrasyvoulos.

Mavrogenidis made 21 appearances (17 starts) for Thrasyvoulos in 2008–09, but at the end of the season the team was relegated back to Beta Ethniki.

== International career ==
Mavrogenidis has 24 caps for the Greece national team.

== Honours ==
Olympiacos

- Alpha Ethniki: 1998, 1999, 2000, 2001, 2002, 2003, 2005, 2006
- Greek Cup: 1999, 2005, 2006
