= Christoforos Zografos =

Greek football referee (born 1969)

- Born: 24 March 1969 (age 57); Athens, Greece

Domestic
Years	League	Role
1998–2014	Super League Greece	Referee

International
Years	League	Role
2004–2008	FIFA listed	Referee

Christoforos Zografos (Greek: Χριστόφορος Ζωγράφος, born 24 March 1969) is a former Greek football referee who currently resides in Athens. He was a full international referee for FIFA since 2004. He belonged at the Athens association.

Zografos was selected as a referee for qualifying rounds of the UEFA Euro 2008, and the qualifying rounds of the UEFA Cup in 2006 and 2007. On 26 May 2015 he resigned from refereeing, due to his involvement in false defamation, perjury and defamation against club agents, after his assault by strangers on 13 November 2014. His resignation was officially accepted by the Central Arbitration Committee on 10 June 2015.

== See also ==
- List of football referees
