= Ieroklis Stoltidis =

Greek executive, coach and retired association football player (born 1975)

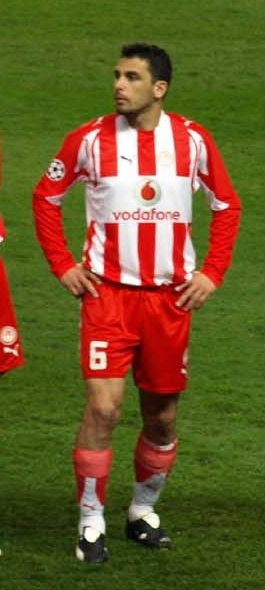
- Stoltidis with Olympiacos Piraeus in 2008

Personal information
- Full name: Ieroklis Stoltidis
- Date of birth: 2 February 1975 (age 51)
- Place of birth: Mavrodendri, Greece
- Height: 1.85 m (6 ft 1 in)
- Position: Midfielder

Team information
- Current team: Iraklis (team manager)

Youth career
- 1988–1990: Odysseas Mavrodendri
- 1990–1992: Pontioi Kozani

Senior career*
Years	Team	Apps	(Gls)
1992–2003	Iraklis	234	(33)
2003–2010	Olympiacos	142	(20)
2010–2011	Kerkyra	27	(2)
Total		403	(55)

International career^{‡}
1994–1998	Greece U21	18	(1)
1999–2000	Greece	6	(0)
2004	Greece Olympic (O.P.)	3	(1)

Managerial career
- 2023–2024: Doxa Drama
- 2024: Iraklis (assistant coach)
- 2024: Iraklis (caretaker)
- 2024–2025: Iraklis (assistant coach)
- 2025: Iraklis (caretaker)
- 2025–2026: Iraklis (assistant coach)
- * Club domestic league appearances and goals as of June 1, 2026 ‡ National team caps and goals as of June 29, 2025

Ieroklis Stoltidis (Greek: Ιεροκλής Στολτίδης; born 2 February 1975) is a Greek retired international professional association football player, who played as midfielder, and is the current team manager of Super League 1 club Iraklis.

== Club career ==
Stoltidis started out with Pontioi Kozanis FC in the fourth division before signing for Iraklis, where he spent eleven years. He made his Alpha Ethniki debut for the Thessaloniki-based club in December 1992 but did not become a regular until 1995–96. The following term he played UEFA Cup football for the first time. Stoltidis stood out in 2002–03 and was named the club's player of the season. In June, after 234 league matches, he left for Olympiacos CFP, signing a two-year contract. He was signed to replace Zé Elias at Olympiacos.

Crucial goals against eventual champions Panathinaikos and AEK Athens in 2003–04 endeared him to supporters. Stoltidis also relished his first taste of UEFA Champions League football, scoring twice in five appearances. A regular in Dušan Bajević's side in 2004–05, he played 25 league matches and scored twice. He appeared in all 540 minutes of the Champions League campaign and scored the winner at home against eventual champions Liverpool. In the same season, he won the Alpha Ethniki as well as the Greek Cup with Olympiacos.

During the 2005–06 season, he started in the first eleven in the Greek El Clasico, Panathinaikos versus Olympiacos, and went on to score in Olympiacos' 2–0 victory. On 23 November 2005, during a Champions League fixture against Rosenborg, he made a reckless challenge on 18-year-old opponent Per Ciljan Skjelbred, breaking both bones in the teenager's lower leg just above the ankle. Stoltidis finished the season with another Olympiacos double as well as the award for Greek Footballer of the Year.

The 2007–08 season would once again prove successful for Stoltidis. One half of Takis Lemonis' defensive midfield duo, Akis formed a strong partnership with Argentine international Cristian Raul Ledesma. Stoltidis also continued his streak of Champions League success, this time helping Olympiacos finish second and gaining entry into the Round of 16. Finishing the group stages with three goals and two assists, Stoltidis pulled off some of the most memorable performances of his career, notably the 3–1 (away) and 3–0 (home) victories against Werder Bremen where Stoltidis found the back of the net three times.

In 2010, he signed with Kerkyra on a one-year contract where he would finish his career a year later in 2011.

== International career ==
Stoltidis was a member of the Greek side defeated in the 1998 UEFA European Under-21 Championship final by Spain. In November 1999, he made his debut for the senior national team and then captained Greece at the 2004 Summer Olympics on home soil. Despite performing at a high rate for his club Olympiakos, he was left out of the UEFA Euro 2004 championship winning squad and the FIFA World Cup 2006 or UEFA Euro 2008 campaigns.

Finally, after years of media speculation, Stoltidis was called up to the national team under Rehhagel for a friendly against the Czech Republic. He declined the invitation stating: I'm no longer at an age where I can perform on all those fronts at the required level. Apart from my gratitude to the fans for their support, I want to assure them that, had this call come earlier in my career, when I was capable of competing on all fronts at a high level, I would have put myself at the disposal of the coach without hesitation.

== Career statistics ==
Appearances and goals by club, season and competition
Club	Season	Apps	Goals
Iraklis	1992–93	1	0
Iraklis	1993–94	6	1
Iraklis	1994–95	17	0
Iraklis	1995–96	27	0
Iraklis	1996–97	28	1
Iraklis	1997–98	27	7
Iraklis	1998–99	30	6
Iraklis	1999–00	32	5
Iraklis	2000–01	13	1
Iraklis	2001–02	25	6
Iraklis	2002–03	28	6
Iraklis	Total	234	33
Olympiacos	2003–04	25	5
Olympiacos	2004–05	26	2
Olympiacos	2005–06	27	5
Olympiacos	2006–07	26	4
Olympiacos	2007–08	26	3
Olympiacos	2008–09	9	1
Olympiacos	2009–10	3	0
Olympiacos	Total	142	20
Kerkyra	2010–11	27	2
Career total		403	55

== Honours ==
Olympiacos

- Super League Greece: 2004–05, 2005–06, 2006–07, 2007–08, 2008–09
- Greek Cup: 2004–05, 2005–06, 2007–08, 2008–09
- Greek Super Cup: 2007

=== Individual ===
- Greek Footballer of the year: 2005-06
