= 2006–07 Super League Greece =

71st season of top-tier football league in Greece

Super League Greece
- Season: 2006–07
- Dates: 19 August 2006 – 13 May 2007
- Champions: Olympiacos; 35th Greek title
- Relegated: Egaleo; Ionikos; Kerkyra
- Champions League: Olympiacos; AEK Athens
- UEFA Cup: AEL (via domestic cup); Aris; Panathinaikos; Panionios
- Intertoto Cup: OFI
- Matches: 240
- Goals: 558 (2.33 per match)
- Top goalscorer: Nikos Liberopoulos (18 goals)
- Biggest home win: AEK Athens 5–0 AEL; Olympiacos 5–0 Apollon Kalamarias
- Biggest away win: Ionikos 1–5 AEK Athens
- Highest scoring: Ionikos 3–5 Olympiacos

The 2006–07 Super League Greece was the 71st season of the highest football league of Greece and the inaugural under the name Super League. The season began on 19 August 2006 and ended on 13 May 2007. Olympiacos clinched the title on 22 April with their victory over Kerkyra, for their third straight title and 10th in the last 11 years.

For the next season, Ionikos, Kerkyra and Egaleo have been relegated to B' Ethniki given that they have finished in the lowest three spots of the table. Asteras Tripolis, Levadiakos and Veria was promoted from B' Ethniki for 2007–08.

== Teams ==
Promoted from 2005–06 Beta Ethniki	Relegated from 2005–06 Alpha Ethniki
Ergotelis; Kerkyra; Aris	Levadiakos; Kallithea; Akratitos

=== Stadiums and personnel ===
Location of the 2006–07 Super League Greece teams

Team	Manager^{1}	Location	Stadium	Capacity
AEK Athens	(Spain) Lorenzo Serra Ferrer	Athens (Marousi)	Athens Olympic Stadium	69,638
AEL	(Greece) Georgios Donis	Larissa	Alcazar Stadium	13,108
Apollon Kalamarias	(Greece) Makis Katsavakis	Thessaloniki (Kalamaria)	Kalamaria Stadium	6,500
Aris	(Spain) Quique Hernández	Thessaloniki (Charilaou)	Kleanthis Vikelidis Stadium	22,800
Atromitos	(Serbia) Dragan Kokotović	Athens (Peristeri)	Peristeri Stadium	9,035
Egaleo	(Greece) Stelios Poulos	Athens (Aigaleo)	Stavros Mavrothalassitis Stadium	8,217
Ergotelis	(Greece) Nikos Karageorgiou	Heraklion (Ammoudara)	Pankritio Stadium	26,400
Ionikos	(Portugal) Augusto Inácio	Piraeus (Nikaia)	Neapoli Stadium	4,999
Iraklis	(Serbia) Ivan Jovanović	Thessaloniki (Triandria)	Kaftanzoglio Stadium	27,560
Kerkyra	(Greece) Babis Tennes	Corfu	Kerkyra Stadium	2,685
OFI	(Germany) Reiner Maurer	Heraklion (Ammoudara)	Pankritio Stadium	26,400
Olympiacos	(Greece) Takis Lemonis	Piraeus (Neo Faliro)	Karaiskakis Stadium	33,334
Panathinaikos	(Spain) Víctor Muñoz	Athens (Marousi)	Athens Olympic Stadium	69,638
Panionios	(Germany) Ewald Lienen	Athens (Nea Smyrni)	Nea Smyrni Stadium	11,756
PAOK	(Greece) Georgios Paraschos	Thessaloniki (Toumba)	Toumba Stadium	28,703
Skoda Xanthi	(Greece) Nikos Kechagias	Xanthi	Skoda Xanthi Arena	7,442

- ^{1} On final match day of the season, played on 13 May 2007.

== League table ==
Pos	Team	Pld	W	D	L	GF	GA	GD	Pts	Qualification or relegation
1	Olympiacos (C)	30	22	5	3	62	23	+39	71	Qualification for the Champions League group stage
2	AEK Athens	30	18	8	4	60	27	+33	62	Qualification for the Champions League third qualifying round
3	Panathinaikos	30	16	6	8	47	28	+19	54	Qualification for the UEFA Cup first round
4	Aris	30	11	13	6	32	26	+6	46	Qualification for the UEFA Cup first round
5	Panionios	30	12	9	9	33	31	+2	45 (Note: Head-to-head record: PAOK–Panionios 1–1, Panionios–PAOK 3–1.)	Qualification for the UEFA Cup first round
6	PAOK	30	13	6	11	32	29	+3	45	
7	OFI	30	12	6	12	41	45	−4	42	Qualification for the Intertoto Cup third round (Note: PAOK turned down entry to the Intertoto Cup allowing OFI to accept the bid from Greece.)
8	Atromitos	30	10	10	10	40	44	−4	40	
9	Ergotelis	30	11	6	13	30	32	−2	39	
10	AEL	30	9	9	12	30	38	−8	36	Qualification for the UEFA Cup first round (Note: Larissa qualified for one of the four UEFA Cup spots based on their victory in the Greek Football Cup.)
11	Skoda Xanthi	30	8	12	10	24	22	+2	36	
12	Apollon Kalamarias	30	9	8	13	27	36	−9	35 (Note: Head-to-head record: Apollon Kalamarias: 9 pts, Iraklis: 4 pts, Kerkyra: 4 pts. Iraklis ahead of Kerkyra on head-to-head goal difference.)	
13	Iraklis	30	10	5	15	25	34	−9	35	
14	Kerkyra (R)	30	8	11	11	34	36	−2	35	Relegation to the Beta Ethniki
15	Egaleo (R)	30	7	7	16	27	45	−18	28	Relegation to the Beta Ethniki
16	Ionikos (Note: Ionikos had 2 points deducted for an attack by the club's chairman on the referee at matchday 6 and 3 points deducted for incidents at matchday 14. The game against Iraklis suspended at the 92nd minute after a violent attack to the assistant referee) (R)	30	2	3	25	14	62	−48	4	Relegation to the Beta Ethniki

Source: Super League Greece
Rules for classification: 1st points; 2nd head-to-head points; 3rd head-to-head goal difference; 4th decision match.
(C) Champions; (R) Relegated

== Results ==
Home \ Away	AEK	AEL	APK	ARIS	ATR	EGA	ERG	ION	IRA	KER	OFI	OLY	PAO	PGSS	PAOK	XAN
AEK Athens		5–0	1–0	3–1	3–0	5–2	3–1	2–0	3–0	1–0	3–1	3–3	1–4	4–0	0–0	0–0
Larissa	0–1		0–1	1–1	2–1	2–2	2–1	3–0	0–1	2–2	1–2	0–0	1–1	1–0	1–2	1–0
Apollon Kalamarias	1–2	1–2		1–1	1–0	0–1	0–0	1–0	2–1	1–0	0–0	1–2	1–1	1–1	3–1	2–0
Aris	1–3	1–1	3–2		1–2	3–1	2–0	1–0	1–0	0–0	3–1	2–3	1–0	2–2	0–0	1–0
Atromitos	1–1	2–2	1–1	1–1		1–1	2–2	1–0	2–2	4–2	2–1	1–0	0–4	0–1	2–1	3–3
Egaleo	1–2	1–2	2–0	0–0	0–0		2–0	3–1	0–1	2–1	1–2	1–1	1–4	0–2	0–2	1–0
Ergotelis	0–0	2–0	0–1	0–1	1–0	3–0		1–1	2–1	1–1	2–0	1–2	0–1	2–1	0–0	3–1
Ionikos	1–5	1–2	1–0	0–1	1–4	1–1	0–1		0–3 (Note: The match between Ionikos and Iraklis was awarded to Iraklis after being suspended at 92nd minute (score: 2–2).)	0–0	0–2	3–5	0–4	1–1	0–2	0–2
Iraklis	1–1	1–0	0–1	0–0	2–3	2–1	0–1	1–0		1–0	2–3	0–1	0–1	0–0	1–0	1–0
Kerkyra	0–1	0–0	2–1	1–1	1–0	3–0	5–1	2–0	0–0		1–0	0–2	3–1	0–1	0–0	0–0
OFI	1–1	0–0	2–0	1–0	4–1	1–0	1–3	2–1	1–0	3–4		1–2	3–3	3–1	1–0	0–2
Olympiacos	1–0	4–0	5–0	0–0	4–1	3–2	1–0	3–0	2–0	3–1	4–1		0–1	1–0	2–0	2–1
Panathinaikos	1–2	1–0	3–2	0–1	1–2	1–0	0–1	0–2	3–0	2–2	2–2	1–0		2–0	2–1	1–0
Panionios	3–1	2–1	3–1	0–0	0–0	0–0	2–0	2–0	2–1	3–1	1–0	0–3	0–1		3–1	0–2
PAOK	2–0	1–3	1–1	1–0	0–3	2–0	3–1	3–0	3–1	1–0	1–0	2–3	2–1	1–1		1–0
Skoda Xanthi	0–0	1–0	0–0	1–1	1–0	0–0	0–0	2–0	1–2	1–1	4–1	0–0	0–0	1–1	1–0	

Source: Worldfootball.net
Legend: Blue = home team win; Yellow = draw; Red = away team win.

== Top scorers ==
Source: Galanis Sports Data

Rank	Player	Club	Goals
1	(Greece) Nikos Liberopoulos	AEK Athens	18
2	(Brazil) Rivaldo	Olympiacos	17
3	(Greece) Dimitris Salpingidis	Panathinaikos	14
3	(Poland) Marcin Mięciel	PAOK	14
5	(Mexico) Nery Castillo	Olympiacos	12
5	(Greece) Dimitris Papadopoulos	Panathinaikos	12
5	(Serbia) Goran Drulić	OFI	12
8	(Spain) Koke	Aris	10
9	(Albania) Alban Bushi	Apollon Kalamarias	9
9	(Brazil) Júlio César	AEK Athens	9

== Awards ==
=== MVP and Best Goal Awards ===
Matchday	MVP	Best Goal	Ref
1st			
2nd			
3rd			
4th			
5th			
6th			
7th			
8th			
9th			
10th			
11th			
12th	(Spain) Víctor Sánchez (Panathinaikos)	(Greece) Stelios Sfakianakis (OFI)	
13th			
14th			
15th			
16th			
17th			
18th			
19th			
20th			
21st			
22nd			
23rd			
24th			
25th			
26th			
27th	(Spain) Koke (Aris)	(Greece) Stelios Iliadis (PAOK)	
28th	(Greece) Kostas Chalkias (Aris)	(Brazil) Rogério Belém (Aris)	
29th			
30th	(Brazil) Rivaldo (Olympiacos)	(Greece) Manolis Skoufalis (Panionios)	

=== Annual awards ===
Annual awards were announced on 17 December 2007.

Award	Winner	Club
Greek Player of the Season	(Greece) Nikos Liberopoulos	AEK Athens
Foreign Player of the Season	(Brazil) Rivaldo	Olympiacos
Young Player of the Season	(Greece) Sotiris Ninis	Panathinaikos
Goalkeeper of the Season	(Poland) Arkadiusz Malarz	Skoda Xanthi
Golden Boot	(Greece) Nikos Liberopoulos	AEK Athens
Manager of the Season	(Germany) Ewald Lienen	Panionios

== Attendances ==
Olympiacos drew the highest average home attendance in the 2006–07 edition of the Super League Greece.

#	Team	Average attendance
1	Olympiacos	22,412
2	AEK Athens	17,244
3	Panathinaikos	14,356
4	Aris	8,719
5	PAOK	8,336
6	AEL	4,545
7	Iraklis	3,711
8	OFI	3,265
9	Panionios	2,940
10	Ergotelis	2,738
11	Skoda Xanthi	2,658
12	Egaleo	1,956
13	Atromitos	1,816
14	Kerkyra	1,580
15	Ionikos	1,378
16	Apollon Kalamarias	1,270
