= 2005–06 Alpha Ethniki =

70th season of top-tier football league in Greece

Alpha Ethniki
- Season: 2005–06
- Dates: 27 August 2005 – 14 May 2006
- Champions: Olympiacos; 34th Greek title
- Relegated: Levadiakos; Kallithea; Akratitos
- Champions League: Olympiacos; AEK Athens
- UEFA Cup: Panathinaikos; Iraklis; Skoda Xanthi; Atromitos
- Intertoto Cup: AEL
- Matches: 240
- Goals: 559 (2.33 per match)
- Top goalscorer: Dimitris Salpingidis (17 goals)

The 2005–06 Alpha Ethniki was the 70th season of the highest football league of Greece and the last season under the name Alpha Ethniki, before then was renamed to Super League Greece. The season began on 27 August 2005 and ended on 13 May 2006. Olympiacos won their second consecutive and 34th Greek title. However, the season was somewhat overshadowed by the suspension of the Greek FA by UEFA, which jeopardized the European places of the Champions League, UEFA Cup, and Intertoto Cup qualifiers from Greece, as well as the use of Athens Olympic Stadium as the site of the 2006–07 Champions League final.

== Teams ==
Promoted from 2004–05 Beta Ethniki	Relegated from 2004–05 Alpha Ethniki
AEL; Levadiakos; Akratitos	Aris; Ergotelis; Kerkyra

=== Stadiums and personnel ===
Location of teams in 2005–06 Alpha Ethniki

Team	Manager^{1}	Location	Stadium	Capacity
AEK Athens	(Portugal) Fernando Santos	Athens (Marousi)	Athens Olympic Stadium	69,638
AEL	(Greece) Georgios Donis	Larissa	Alcazar Stadium	13,108
Akratitos	(Greece) Vangelis Goutis	Athens (Ano Liosia)	Giannis Pathiakakis Stadium	4,944
Apollon Kalamarias	(Greece) Makis Katsavakis	Thessaloniki (Kalamaria)	Kalamaria Stadium	6,500
Atromitos	(Greece) Georgios Paraschos	Athens (Peristeri)	Peristeri Stadium	9,035
Egaleo	(Greece) Georgios Chatzaras	Athens (Aigaleo)	Stavros Mavrothalassitis Stadium	8,217
Ionikos	(Greece) Sakis Tsiolis	Piraeus (Nikaia)	Neapoli Stadium	4,999
Iraklis	(Greece) Savvas Kofidis	Thessaloniki (Triandria)	Kaftanzoglio Stadium	27,560
Kallithea	(Romania) Ilie Dumitrescu	Athens (Kallithea)	Grigoris Lambrakis Stadium	4,250
Levadiakos	(Greece) Takis Lemonis	Livadeia	Levadia Municipal Stadium	5,915
OFI	(Greece) Myron Sifakis	Heraklion (Kaminia)	Theodoros Vardinogiannis Stadium	9,000
Olympiacos	(Norway) Trond Sollied	Piraeus (Neo Faliro)	Karaiskakis Stadium	33,334
Panathinaikos	(Italy) Alberto Malesani	Athens (Marousi)	Athens Olympic Stadium	69,638
Panionios	(Slovakia) Jozef Bubenko	Athens (Nea Smyrni)	Nea Smyrni Stadium	11,756
PAOK	(Greece) Georgios Kostikos	Thessaloniki (Toumba)	Toumba Stadium	28,703
Skoda Xanthi	(Greece) Ioannis Matzourakis	Xanthi	Skoda Xanthi Arena	7,442

- ^{1} On final match day of the season, played on 13 May 2006.

== League table ==
Pos	Team	Pld	W	D	L	GF	GA	GD	Pts	Qualification or relegation
1	Olympiacos (C)	30	23	1	6	63	23	+40	70	Qualification for Champions League group stage
2	AEK Athens	30	21	4	5	42	20	+22	67 (Note: Head-to-head points (goal difference): AEK 3 (+2), Panathinaikos 3 (-2).)	Qualification for Champions League third qualifying round
3	Panathinaikos	30	21	4	5	55	23	+32	67	Qualification for UEFA Cup first round
4	Iraklis	30	15	6	9	39	31	+8	51	Qualification for UEFA Cup first round
5	Skoda Xanthi	30	13	8	9	31	25	+6	47	Qualification for UEFA Cup first round
6	PAOK	30	13	7	10	44	31	+13	46	Ineligible for 2006–07 European competitions (Note: PAOK were not licensed to play in the UEFA Cup therefore was replaced by the 7th placed team in the league table, Atromitos.)
7	Atromitos	30	12	6	12	36	37	−1	42	Qualification for UEFA Cup first round
8	AEL	30	10	9	11	31	37	−6	39	Qualification for Intertoto Cup third round
9	Apollon Kalamarias	30	10	8	12	32	36	−4	38	
10	Egaleo	30	8	9	13	23	41	−18	33	
11	Panionios	30	9	5	16	33	45	−12	32 (Note: Head-to-head points: Panionios 4, Ionikos 1.)	
12	Ionikos	30	6	14	10	36	41	−5	32	
13	OFI	30	7	10	13	23	37	−14	31 (Note: Head-to-head points (goal difference): OFI 3 (+1), Levadiakos 3 (-1).)	
14	Levadiakos (R)	30	8	7	15	24	36	−12	31	Relegation to Beta Ethniki
15	Kallithea (R)	30	4	8	18	28	49	−21	20	Relegation to Beta Ethniki
16	Akratitos (R)	30	4	6	20	19	47	−28	18	Relegation to Delta Ethniki (Note: Akratitos were demoted to the Delta Ethniki owing to financial bankruptcy.)

Source: Galanis Sports Data
Rules for classification: 1) Points; 2) Head-to-head points; 3) Head-to-head goal difference; 4) Goal difference; 5) Goals scored; 6) Goals against; 7) Play-offs (neutral ground); 8) Draw.
(Note: Criterion 7 is only used if needed to decide champion, teams for relegation or teams for UEFA competitions).
(C) Champions; (R) Relegated

== Results ==
Home \ Away	AEK	AEL	AKR	APK	ATR	EGA	ION	IRA	KLT	LEV	OFI	OLY	PAO	PGSS	PAOK	XAN
AEK Athens		1–0	2–0	2–1	2–1	1–1	2–1	2–0	2–0	2–0	2–0	1–3	3–0	2–0	2–1	0–0
Larissa	0–1		2–1	4–1	2–1	1–1	0–0	0–0	2–0	1–0	1–0	2–1	0–3	1–0	2–1	3–1
Akratitos	1–2	0–0		1–3	0–2	0–3	0–0	3–1	1–0	0–0	1–1	0–1	0–2	0–1	0–3	2–0
Apollon Kalamarias	0–1	2–2	3–0		1–2	0–0	2–1	2–0	0–0	1–1	2–1	1–2	0–1	1–0	2–2	2–1
Atromitos	0–0	0–0	2–0	1–1		0–0	3–2	3–2	2–1	1–0	4–0	0–1	1–0	1–3	2–1	0–1
Egaleo	0–2	1–0	1–0	0–0	0–1		1–1	1–1	1–0	1–0	0–0	1–3	0–2	0–3	1–0	3–2
Ionikos	0–1	1–1	3–2	2–0	3–1	4–1		1–1	2–1	2–0	1–1	0–1	1–1	0–1	1–1	0–0
Iraklis	4–0	2–1	1–0	0–1	2–0	4–2	2–1		3–2	2–0	2–0	2–0	1–0	1–0	0–0	2–0
Kallithea	1–4	2–1	2–0	0–0	2–3	1–1	3–3	0–0		3–2	0–1	0–3	2–4	1–2	1–1	2–1
Levadiakos	0–1	3–0	1–1	1–0	1–0	2–1	1–1	0–1	1–0		1–0	3–2	0–0	3–2	1–0	0–2
OFI	0–1	3–2	2–2	1–2	0–0	1–0	3–0	0–1	0–0	2–0		1–0	0–2	1–1	2–1	1–1
Olympiacos	3–0	4–0	2–0	2–1	3–0	5–1	0–0	2–1	2–1	1–0	4–0		3–2	5–0	1–2	2–0
Panathinaikos	1–0	3–0	1–0	3–0	4–3	4–0	1–0	2–2	2–0	2–0	3–1	0–2		3–0	1–0	2–1
Panionios	0–2	1–1	2–4	2–1	2–0	0–1	3–3	3–0	1–0	1–1	1–1	2–3	2–4		0–1	0–2
PAOK	2–1	2–2	2–0	1–2	2–2	2–0	6–1	1–0	2–1	3–1	2–0	1–2	0–1	1–0		1–0
Skoda Xanthi	0–0	1–0	2–0	2–0	1–0	1–0	1–1	4–1	2–2	1–0	0–0	1–0	1–1	1–0	1–1	

Source: Worldfootball.net
Legend: Blue = home team win; Yellow = draw; Red = away team win.

== Top scorers ==
Source: Galanis Sports Data

Rank	Player	Club	Goals
1	(Greece) Dimitris Salpingidis	PAOK	17
2	(Brazil) Luciano de Souza	Panionios	15
2	(Serbia and Montenegro) Predrag Đorđević	Olympiacos	15
4	(Greece) Nikos Liberopoulos	AEK Athens	14
4	(Greece) Theofanis Gekas	Panathinaikos	14
6	(Cameroon) Joël Epalle	Iraklis	13
7	(Liberia) Oliver Makor	Ionikos	10
7	(Greece) Dimitrios Papadopoulos	Panathinaikos	10
7	(Cyprus) Michalis Konstantinou	Olympiacos	10
10	(Brazil) Cleyton	Apollon Kalamarias	9

== Awards ==
=== Annual awards ===
Annual awards were announced on 11 December 2006.

Award	Winner	Club
Greek Player of the Season	(Greece) Ieroklis Stoltidis (Greece) Nikos Liberopoulos	Olympiacos; AEK Athens
Foreign Player of the Season	(Brazil) Rivaldo	Olympiacos
Young Player of the Season	(Greece) Panagiotis Lagos	Iraklis
Goalkeeper of the Season	(Greece) Antonios Nikopolidis	Olympiacos
Golden Boot	(Greece) Dimitris Salpingidis	PAOK
Manager of the Season	(Greece) Savvas Kofidis	Iraklis

== Attendances ==
Olympiacos drew the highest average home attendance in the 2005–06 Alpha Ethniki.

#	Team	Average attendance
1	Olympiacos	21,270
2	Panathinaikos	16,922
3	AEK Athens	16,166
4	AEL	6,995
5	OFI	4,715
6	Iraklis	4,330
7	Skoda Xanthi	3,952
8	PAOK	3,909
9	Atromitos	2,345
10	Levadiakos	2,232
11	Panionios	2,185
12	Kallithea	1,446
13	Ionikos	1,335
14	Apollon Kalamarias	1,279
15	Egaleo	1,212
16	Akratitos	573
