= 2007–08 AEK Athens F.C. season =

AEK Athens
2007–08 season
- Chairman: Demis Nikolaidis
- Manager: Lorenzo Serra Ferrer (until 12 February); Nikos Kostenoglou
- Stadium: Athens Olympic Stadium
- Super League: 3rd (After play-offs); 2nd (Regular season)
- Greek Cup: Round of 16
- UEFA Champions League: Third qualifying round
- UEFA Cup: Round of 32
- Top goalscorer: League: Ismael Blanco (19); All: Ismael Blanco (21)
- Highest home attendance: 40,955 vs Olympiacos (30 March 2008)
- Lowest home attendance: 5,032 vs Panathinaikos (14 May 2008)
- Average home league attendance: 21,551
- Biggest win: AEK Athens 5–0 Panionios
- Biggest defeat: Aris 4–0 AEK Athens
Home colours	Away colours	Third colours

The 2007–08 season was the 84th season in the existence of AEK Athens F.C. and the 49th consecutive season in the top flight of Greek football. They competed in the Super League, the Greek Cup, the Champions League and the UEFA Cup. The season began on 15 August 2007 and finished on 14 May 2008.

== Kits ==
Supplier: Puma
Sponsor(s): LG Corp
Features: Diners Club, Chevrolet, Forthnet

Home	Away	Third

== Overview ==
In the summer of 2007, AEK strengthened their roster with many players with the more resounding transfer being that of Rivaldo, while also Blanco, Macho, Arruabarrena and Nsaliwa among others, joined the team, as the Spanish Serra Ferrer remained at their bench. The club sold 25,495 season tickets.

The draw of the third qualifying round of the UEFA Champions League brought the Spanish Sevilla against AEK. AEK had a very positive presence at Ramón Sánchez Pizjuán Stadium, but lost with two goals in the second half. The rematch of Athens was overshadowed by the tragedy of the death of the Sevilla player, Antonio Puerta. UEFA postponed the game, ordering it to be played a week later. AEK welcomed Sevilla on the evening of September 3, lined up with full offensive orientations. They put a lot of pressure on Sevilla in the first twenty minutes, but a penalty by Júlio César put an end to any chances of qualification for AEK, who finally went on to the UEFA Cup with a heavy 1–4.

In the first round of the UEFA Cup, AEK were drawn with the Austrian Salzburg, which had now moved to the Red Bull group. In Athens, AEK took the lead early in the match and in the second half, AEK doubled the lead the goal-poem from Rivaldo with a mixture of volley and scissor-kick. Towards the end, AEK scored a third goal and gained a huge lead for the rematch. At the Red Bull Arena, Salzburg's goal put AEK in danger and by defending properly, kept the difference from the first leg and thus the qualification to the group stage. There they met Villarreal, Fiorentina, Mladá Boleslav and Elfsborg, where with 1 win, 2 draws and 1 loss they finished third and advanced to the round of 32.

In the league, the yellow-blacks started the year strong by winning the first 6 matches and it took until the 7th match to have their first loss. They were also defeated by Asteras Tripolis in a match after which the vice-president, Nikos Koulis stated that AEK had the right to object to the illegal participation of the footballer of Asteras, Sokratis Fyntanidis, but such a move did not suit the mentality of AEK and so the matter did not proceed. Something that AEK would to find in front of them later in the season. Then 2 consecutive defeats in the middle of the season, left AEK well behind in the league race. On 3 February, Olympiacos lost to Apollon Kalamarias with 1–0. After the match, the red and whites found out that the player of Apollon, Roman Wallner had an irregular participation because he had already played in the same season in 2 teams and therefore did not have the right to play in a third one. The HFF nevertheless issued a report to the footballer. Olympiacos, who did not share the same morals as AEK, filed an objection and asked to win the match "on paper". The decision that came out ordered the replay of the match, which did not satisfy the Piraeus who appealed the decision.

In the Cup, AEK eliminated Fostiras of Daniel Batista in the round of 32. In the next phase, AEK faced Skoda Xanthi in a knockout game where, playing bad football, were eliminated with a 2–0 defeat. The people of the team disapproved of players, coach and management and 3 days later Serra Ferrer was sacked. The position of coach was taken over by his assistant and former footballer of the team, Nikos Kostenoglou.

AEK recovered competitively by making some victories, while Olympiacos, who rested on their high difference started throwing away points, but did not show that their top spot was seriously threatened. While the Wallner case was unfolding, the championship was coming to an end with Olympiacos losing their concentration and AEK covering up the difference. On 30 March, AEK beat Olympiacos with an emphatic 4–0 and got the upper hand on claiming the league. However, the decision of the Appeals Committee of the HFF ruled the game on paper in favor of Olympiacos and with their victory against AEL on the 27th matchday secured the championship. Apollon Kalamarias finally appealed to CAS, which considered itself incompetent, did not proceed with the examination of the case and the standings were validated since the championship had already ended. In the penultimate matchday against PAOK in Toumba Stadium, AEK played outstanding football and won easily by 0–4. In the last match against Asteras Tripolis, AEK honored Akis Zikos for his contribution to the club, while there was tension in the stands as the crowd wanted to honor the "champion" of that season, AEK who, however, would not lift the cup that afternoon. In Piraeus, however, they celebrated as if nothing had happened. Eventually the regular season ended with a message on the stadium matrix reading "Proud of AEK 2007–2008".

In the round of 32 of the UEFA Cup, AEK were drawn with the Spanish Getafe. Kostenoglou made a lot of changes in faces and the formation, but the team did not seem to respond. Getafe took the lead three minutes before the end and AEK reacted, closing the Spaniards in their area, reaching the equalizer with a rare beauty back-heel shot of Blanco. The second leg at the Coliseum Alfonso Pérez was one of AEK's worst nights in European cups. Getafe chased the qualification and easily won with 3–0. AEK was unacceptable, passionless and indifferent and ended the month with exclusion from the European cups.

After the team were deprived of winning the league and without administrative reactions and collisions within the club, AEK went down to the play-offs under the shadow of the Wallner case. After the easy victory in the first game against Panionios, bad appearances followed, lackluster and with obvious internal problems in the team's performance. As it turned out later, many boardmembers and footballers did not even want to participate in the play-offs. AEK suffered great defeats at Leoforos Alexandras Stadium and Kleanthis Vikelidis Stadium and with the last two matches being completely indifferent, the team finished third, where they should have been crowned champions.

== Management team ==
Position	Staff
Manager	(Greece) Nikos Kostenoglou
Assistant manager	(Spain) Pep Alomar
Goalkeeping coach	(Serbia) Slobodan Šujica
Fitness coach	(Spain) Pep Alomar
Fitness coach	(Cyprus) Antonis Kezos
Technical director	(Netherlands) Eugène Gerards
Academy director	(North Macedonia) Toni Savevski
Academy manager	(Albania) Bledar Kola
Scout	(Netherlands) Eugène Gerards
Scout	(Greece) Dimitris Markos
Head of Medical	(Greece) Lakis Nikolaou

== Players ==
=== Squad information ===
NOTE: The players are the ones that have been announced by the AEK Athens' press release. No edits should be made unless a player arrival or exit is announced. Updated 14 May 2008, 23:59 UTC+3.

No.	Player	Nat.	Position(s)	Date of birth (Age)	Signed	Previous club	Transfer fee	Contract until
Goalkeepers
32	Marcelo Moretto	(Brazil)	GK	10 May 1978 (aged 30)	2007	(Portugal) Benfica	€800,000	2008
50	Jürgen Macho	(Austria)	GK	24 August 1977 (aged 30)	2007	(Germany) Kaiserslautern	€300,000	2009
84	Giannis Arabatzis	(Greece)	GK	28 May 1984 (aged 24)	2002	(Greece) Enosi Apostolou Pavlou	€22,000	2011
Defenders
2	Edson Ratinho	(Brazil)	RB / RM / RW	31 May 1986 (aged 22)	2007	(Brazil) Mogi Mirim	€350,000	2012
3	Rodolfo Arruabarrena	(Argentina) (Spain)	LB	20 July 1975 (aged 32)	2007	(Spain) Villarreal	Free	2009
4	Geraldo Alves	(Portugal)	CB / RB	8 November 1980 (aged 27)	2007	(Portugal) Paços de Ferreira	€300,000	2010
5	Traianos Dellas (Captain)	(Greece)	CB	31 January 1976 (aged 32)	2005	(Italy) Roma	Free	2009
6	Georgios Alexopoulos	(Greece)	CB / RB	7 February 1977 (aged 31)	2005	(Greece) Egaleo	Free	2010
14	Federico Azcárate	(Argentina)	CB	15 June 1984 (aged 24)	2007	(Spain) Atlético Madrid B	Free	2011
15	Sokratis Papastathopoulos	(Greece)	CB / RB / LB / DM	9 June 1988 (aged 20)	2005	(Greece) Apollon Petalidiou	Free	2008
31	Nikolaos Georgeas (Vice-captain 3)	(Greece)	RB / LB / DM	27 December 1976 (aged 31)	2001	(Greece) Kalamata	€1,500,000	2010
Midfielders
1	Pantelis Kafes (Vice-captain 2)	(Greece)	CM / DM / AM / RM / LM	24 June 1978 (aged 30)	2007	(Greece) Olympiacos	Free	2010
8	Tam Nsaliwa	(Canada) (Germany)	DM / CM / CB	28 January 1982 (aged 26)	2007	(Greece) Panionios	€400,000	2010
10	Rivaldo	(Brazil)	AM / SS / LM	19 April 1972 (aged 36)	2007	(Greece) Olympiacos	Free	2009
11	Gustavo Manduca	(Brazil)	RM / AM / RW / LM / LW / CM / SS / ST	8 June 1980 (aged 28)	2007	(Portugal) Benfica	€800,000	2010
16	Akis Zikos	(Greece)	DM / CM	1 June 1974 (aged 34)	2006	(France) Monaco	Free	2008
19	Panagiotis Lagos	(Greece)	LM / LW / LB / CM / DM	18 July 1985 (aged 22)	2006	(Greece) Iraklis	€900,000	2010
22	Panagiotis Kone	(Greece) (Albania)	AM / RM / LM / RW / LW / CM	26 July 1987 (aged 20)	2005	(France) Lens U19	Free	2010
25	Vasilios Pliatsikas	(Greece)	DM / CM / RB / CB	20 April 1988 (aged 20)	2005	(Greece) Chaidari	Free	2010
27	Christos Bourbos	(Greece)	RM / RB / LM / LB / RW / DM	1 June 1983 (aged 25)	2004	(Greece) PAS Giannina	Free	2008
34	Panagiotis Tachtsidis	(Greece)	CM / DM / AM	15 February 1991 (aged 17)	2007	(Greece) AEK Athens U20	—	2010
80	Georgios Tofas	(Cyprus)	AM / RM / LM	17 June 1989 (aged 19)	2007	(Cyprus) Enosis Neon Paralimni	Free	2010
88	Dániel Tőzsér	(Hungary)	AM / CM / DM / LM	12 May 1985 (aged 23)	2006	(Hungary) Ferencváros	€150,000	2010
Forwards
7	Charilaos Pappas	(Greece)	RW / LM / LW / SS	12 May 1983 (aged 25)	2007	(Greece) Olympiacos	Free	2009
9	Pantelis Kapetanos	(Greece)	ST / RW	8 June 1983 (aged 25)	2006	(Greece) Iraklis	€400,000	2011
18	Ismael Blanco	(Argentina)	ST / SS	19 January 1983 (aged 25)	2007	(Argentina) Colón	€450,000	2008
20	Manú	(Portugal)	RW / RM / LW / LM	28 August 1982 (aged 25)	2007	(Portugal) Benfica	Free	2008
23	Mohamed Kallon	(Sierra Leone)	ST / SS / LW	19 January 1983 (aged 25)	2008	Free agent	Free	2008
33	Nikos Liberopoulos (Vice-captain)	(Greece)	SS / ST / AM	4 August 1975 (aged 32)	2003	(Greece) Panathinaikos	Free	2009
36	Edinho	(Portugal) (Guinea-Bissau)	ST / SS / RW	7 July 1982 (aged 25)	2008	(Portugal) Vitória de Setúbal	€150,000	2008
83	Michalis Pavlis	(Greece)	SS / ST / RW / LW	22 September 1989 (aged 18)	2006	(Greece) AEK Athens U20	—	2011
99	Júlio César	(Brazil)	LW / SS / AM / RW / ST	26 February 1980 (aged 28)	2005	(Portugal) Gil Vicente	€540,000	2009
Left during Winter Transfer Window
81	Xenofon Panos	(Greece)	RB / RM / LB	25 August 1989 (aged 18)	2007	(Greece) AEK Athens U20	—	2011
89	Nikos Barboudis	(Greece) (Romania)	RB / CB	6 March 1989 (aged 19)	2007	(Greece) Ilisiakos	€60,000	2010
24	El Hadji Diouf	(Senegal)	AM / CM	20 August 1989 (aged 18)	2007	(Senegal) Xam-Xam	Free	2011
56	Përparim Hetemaj	(Finland) (Serbia)	CM / DM / AM / RM / LM / RW / LW	12 December 1986 (aged 21)	2006	(Finland) HJK Helsinki	€450,000	2010

== Transfers ==
=== In ===
==== Summer ====
No.	Pos.	Player	From	Fee	Date	Contract Until	Source
2	DF	(Brazil) Edson Ratinho	(Brazil) Mogi Mirim	€350,000	1 July 2007	30 June 2012	
3	DF	(Argentina) Rodolfo Arruabarrena	(Spain) Villarreal	Free transfer	1 July 2007	30 June 2009	
4	DF	(Portugal) Geraldo Alves	(Portugal) Paços de Ferreira	€300,000	1 July 2007	30 June 2010	
7	FW	(Greece) Charilaos Pappas	(Greece) Olympiacos	Free transfer	1 July 2007	30 June 2010	
8	MF	(Canada) Tam Nsaliwa	(Greece) Panionios	€400,000	1 July 2007	30 June 2010	
10	MF	(Brazil) Rivaldo	(Greece) Olympiacos	Free transfer	1 July 2007	30 June 2009	
11	MF	(Brazil) Gustavo Manduca	(Portugal) Benfica	€800,000	1 July 2007	30 June 2010	
14	DF	(Argentina) Federico Azcárate	(Spain) Atlético Madrid B	Free transfer	1 July 2007	30 June 2011	
24	MF	(Senegal) El Hadji Diouf	(Senegal) Xam-Xam	Free transfer	25 July 2007	30 June 2011	
27	MF	(Greece) Christos Bourbos	(Greece) Kerkyra	Loan return	1 July 2007	30 June 2010	
34	MF	(Greece) Panagiotis Tachtsidis	(Greece) AEK Athens U20	Promotion	1 July 2007	30 June 2010	
50	GK	(Austria) Jürgen Macho	(Germany) Kaiserslautern	€300,000	31 August 2007	30 June 2009	
80	MF	(Cyprus) Georgios Tofas	(Greece) Ethnikos Piraeus	Loan return	1 July 2007	30 June 2010	
81	DF	(Greece) Xenofon Panos	(Greece) AEK Athens U20	Promotion	1 July 2007	30 June 2011	
89	DF	(Greece) Nikos Barboudis	(Greece) Ilisiakos	€60,000	1 July 2007	30 June 2010	
—	GK	(Greece) Giannis Fysekis	(Greece) Anagennisi Karditsa	Loan return	1 July 2007	30 June 2010	
—	DF	(Greece) Panagiotis Stergiatos	(Greece) Anagennisi Karditsa	Loan return	1 July 2007	30 June 2008	
—	DF	(Greece) Dimitrios Koutromanos	(Greece) Ethnikos Piraeus	Loan return	1 July 2007	30 June 2011	
—	DF	(Greece) Vasilios Vallianos	(Greece) Anagennisi Karditsa	Loan return	1 July 2007	30 June 2008	
—	DF	(Greece) Andreas Chronis	(United States) NY Red Bulls Academy	Free transfer	1 July 2007	31 December 2010	
—	MF	(Greece) Nikolaos Kaltsas	(Greece) Anagennisi Karditsa	Loan return	1 July 2007	30 June 2010	
—	MF	(Greece) Panagiotis Zorbas	(Greece) Niki Volos	Loan return	1 July 2007	30 June 2011	
—	FW	(Greece) Angelos Komvolidis	(Greece) Ethnikos Piraeus	Loan return	1 July 2007	30 June 2010	

==== Winter ====
No.	Pos.	Player	From	Fee	Date	Contract Until	Source
23	FW	(Sierra Leone) Mohamed Kallon	Free agent	Free transfer	29 January 2008	30 June 2008	
—	DF	(Greece) Savvas Gentsoglou	(Greece) Panachaiki	Loan termination	31 December 2007	30 June 2009	
—	MF	(Greece) Nikolaos Kaltsas	(Greece) Anagennisi Karditsa	Loan termination	31 December 2007	30 June 2010	

=== Out ===
==== Summer ====
No.	Pos.	Player	To	Fee	Date	Source
4	DF	(Greece) Vangelis Moras	(Italy) Bologna	End of contract	1 July 2007	
5	DF	(Italy) Bruno Cirillo	(Spain) Levante	Contract termination	4 July 2007	
7	MF	(Greece) Ilias Kyriakidis	(Greece) AEL	€225,000	17 June 2007	
11	MF	(Brazil) Gustavo Manduca	(Portugal) Benfica	Loan return	30 June 2007	
13	DF	(Argentina) Martin Pautasso	(Paraguay) Club Olimpia	Contract termination	30 June 2007	
14	DF	(Greece) Stavros Tziortziopoulos	(Cyprus) Omonia Nicosia	End of contract	1 July 2007	
17	MF	(Serbia) Vladan Ivić	(Greece) Aris	Contract termination	31 August 2007	
22	GK	(Greece) Dionysis Chiotis	(Greece) Kerkyra	End of contract	27 July 2007	
23	MF	(Greece) Vasilios Lakis	(Greece) PAOK	Contract termination	3 July 2007	
25	MF	(Brazil) Emerson	(Cyprus) APOEL	End of contract	1 July 2007	
79	FW	(Greece) Leonidas Kampantais	(Germany) Arminia Bielefeld	End of contract	1 July 2007	
—	GK	(Greece) Antonis Lykouris	(Greece) A.O. Nea Ionia	Contract termintion	30 August 2007	
—	FW	(Greece) Angelos Komvolidis	(Greece) Iraklis	Contract termintion	24 July 2007	

=== Loan in ===
==== Summer ====
No.	Pos.	Player	From	Fee	Date	Until	Option to buy	Source
18	FW	(Argentina) Ismael Blanco	(Argentina) Colón	€450,000	10 August 2007	30 June 2008	✓	
20	FW	(Portugal) Manú	(Portugal) Benfica	Free	30 August 2007	30 June 2008	✓	
32	GK	(Brazil) Marcelo Moretto	(Portugal) Benfica	€800,000	13 July 2007	30 June 2008	✓	

==== Winter ====
No.	Pos.	Player	From	Fee	Date	Until	Option to buy	Source
36	FW	(Portugal) Edinho	(Portugal) Vitória de Setúbal	€150,000	1 February 2008	30 June 2008	✓	

=== Loan out ===
==== Summer ====
No.	Pos.	Player	To	Fee	Date	Until	Option to buy	Source
28	GK	(Italy) Stefano Sorrentino	(Spain) Recreativo de Huelva	€340,000	16 July 2007	30 June 2008	✓	
90	DF	(Greece) Savvas Gentsoglou	(Greece) Panachaiki	Free	30 August 2007	30 June 2008	✗	
—	GK	(Greece) Giannis Fysekis	(Greece) Anagennisi Karditsa	Free	4 July 2007	30 June 2008	✗	
—	DF	(Greece) Panagiotis Stergiatos	(Greece) Anagennisi Karditsa	Free	4 July 2007	30 June 2008	✗	
—	DF	(Greece) Nikolaos Kourkoulas	(Greece) A.O. Nea Ionia	Free	30 June 2007	30 June 2008	✗	
—	DF	(Greece) Dimitrios Koutromanos	(Greece) Anagennisi Karditsa	Free	30 June 2007	30 June 2008	✗	
—	DF	(Greece) Andreas Chronis	(Greece) A.O. Nea Ionia	Free	30 June 2007	30 June 2009	✗	
—	DF	(Greece) Vasilios Vallianos	(Greece) A.O. Nea Ionia	Free	30 June 2007	30 June 2008	✗	
—	MF	(Greece) Nikolaos Kaltsas	(Greece) Anagennisi Karditsa	Free	4 July 2007	30 June 2008	✗	
—	MF	(Greece) Georgios Paligeorgos	(Greece) Anagennisi Karditsa	Free	4 July 2007	30 June 2009	✗	
—	MF	(Greece) Panagiotis Zorbas	(Greece) Panetolikos	Free	1 July 2007	30 June 2008	✗	

==== Winter ====
No.	Pos.	Player	To	Fee	Date	Until	Option to buy	Source
24	MF	(Senegal) El Hadji Diouf	(Greece) Ilisiakos	Free	29 January 2008	30 June 2008	✗	
56	MF	(Finland) Përparim Hetemaj	(Greece) Apollon Kalamarias	Free	29 January 2008	30 June 2008	✗	
81	DF	(Greece) Xenofon Panos	(Greece) A.O. Nea Ionia	Free	11 January 2008	30 June 2009	✗	
89	DF	(Greece) Nikos Barboudis	(Greece) Fostiras	Free	11 January 2008	30 June 2008	✗	
—	GK	(Greece) Giannis Fysekis	(Greece) Lamia	Free	11 January 2008	30 June 2008	✗	
—	DF	(Greece) Savvas Gentsoglou	(Greece) A.O. Nea Ionia	Free	11 January 2008	30 June 2008	✗	
—	MF	(Greece) Nikolaos Kaltsas	(Greece) Acharnaikos	Free	31 December 2007	30 June 2008	✗	

=== Contract renewals ===
No.	Pos.	Player	Date	Former Exp. Date	New Exp. Date	Source
5	DF	(Greece) Traianos Dellas	1 June 2007	30 June 2007	30 June 2009	
6	DF	(Greece) Georgios Alexopoulos	23 May 2008	30 June 2008	30 June 2010	
31	DF	(Greece) Nikolaos Georgeas	22 May 2008	30 June 2008	30 June 2010	
84	GK	(Greece) Giannis Arabatzis	30 June 2007	30 June 2007	30 June 2011	

=== Overall transfer activity ===
==== Expenditure ====
Summer: ▼€3,460,000

Winter: ▼€150,000

Total: ▼€3,610,000

==== Income ====
Summer: ▲€565,000

Winter: ▲€0

Total: ▲€565,000

==== Net Totals ====
Summer: ▼€2,895,000

Winter: ▼€150,000

Total: ▼€3,045,000

== Pre-season and friendlies ==
10 July 2007 Friendly	Emst	0–11	AEK Athens	Doorwerth
20:00 EEST (UTC+3)		Report	Ivić 4', 33', 45'; César 35'; Kapetanos 42'; Arruabarrena 49'; Rivaldo 59'; Azcárate 59'; Pavlis 75'; Tofas 86'; Manduca 90+'	Stadium: Sportpark De Waayenberg

12 July 2007 Friendly	Bocholt	1–4	AEK Athens	Bocholt
20:00 EEST (UTC+3)	Massop 20'	Report	Tofas 22'; Rivaldo 34'; Liberopoulos 63'; Pavlis 68'	Stadium: Stadion am Hünting

14 July 2007 Friendly	AGOVV Apeldoorn	0–4	AEK Athens	Doorwerth
20:00 EEST (UTC+3)		Report	Pavlis 4'; Manduca 49'; Rivaldo 58'; César 79'	Stadium: Sportpark De Waayenberg

16 July 2007 Friendly	Steaua București	1–1	AEK Athens	Doorwerth
21:00 EEST (UTC+3)	Guriță 90+1'	Report	Rivaldo 14'	Stadium: Sportpark De Waayenberg

19 July 2007 Friendly	Ankaraspor	1–1	AEK Athens	Doorwerth
20:00 EEST (UTC+3)	Güneş 53'	Report	Pavlis 83'	Stadium: Sportpark De Waayenberg

24 July 2007 Friendly	Agios Dimitrios	1–0	AEK Athens	Agios Dimitrios
19:00 EEST (UTC+3)	Tsiolis 64'	Report		Stadium: Agios Dimitrios Municipal Stadium; Attendance: 2,500

26 July 2007 Friendly	AEK Athens	1–0	A.O. Nea Ionia	Thrakomakedones
19:00 EEST (UTC+3)	Ratinho 26'	Report		Stadium: AEK Athens' training complex
Note: The game ended after 60 minutes, due to the unbearable heat at Thrakomakedones.

29 July 2007 Friendly	AEK Athens	2–0	Club Brugge	Marousi
21:15 EEST (UTC+3)	Rivaldo 9'; Liberopoulos 56'	Report		Stadium: Olympic Stadium; Attendance: 14,036

5 August 2007 Friendly	AEK Athens	1–3	Livorno	Marousi
21:15 EEST (UTC+3)	Arruabarrena 51'	Report	A. Filippini 21'; Volpe 79', 86'	Stadium: Olympic Stadium; Attendance: 11,480; Referee: Kostas Papastamatis (Athens)

18 August 2007 Friendly	AEK Athens	1–1	Ethnikos Asteras	Marousi
18:45 EEST (UTC+3)	Tozsér 11'	Report	Evangelatos 44'	Stadium: Olympic Stadium

30 August 2007 Friendly	AEK Athens	5–1	AEK Athens U20	Marousi
	Kone 19'; Pliatsikas 25'; Tozsér 30'; Kafes 37'; Manú 39'	Report	Pavlis 37' (pen.)	Stadium: Olympic Stadium
Note: 50 minute match.

30 August 2007 Friendly	AEK Athens	3–1	A.O. Nea Ionia	Marousi
	Manduca 21'; Nsaliwa 29'; Liberopoulos 46'	Report	Yfantis 43' (pen.)	Stadium: Olympic Stadium
Note: 50-minute match. Charilaos Pappas competed with Nea Ionia against AEK.

9 September 2007 Charity match	AEK Athens	1–1	PAOK	Marousi
18:00 EEST (UTC+3)	Udeze 27' (o.g.)	Report	Udeze (yellow card) 6'; Orfanos 29'; Salmon (yellow card) 33'	Stadium: Olympic Stadium; Attendance: 8,620
Note: Friendly game to raise money for the 2007 Greek forest fires victims, that lasted 45 minutes.

9 September 2007 Charity match	AEK Athens	0–1	AEL	Marousi
19:00 EEST (UTC+3)		Report	Cleyton 23'	Stadium: Olympic Stadium; Attendance: 8,620
Note: Friendly game to raise money for the 2007 Greek forest fires victims, that lasted 45 minutes.

14 September 2007 Friendly	Thrasyvoulos	1–3	AEK Athens	Fyli
17:30 EEST (UTC+3)	Anastasakos 9'	Report	Azcárate 12'; Blanco 50'; Tofas 89'	Stadium: Fyli Municipal Stadium

== Competitions ==
=== Overall record ===
Competition	First match	Last match	Starting round	Final position	Record							
Competition	First match	Last match	Starting round	Final position	Pld	W	D	L	GF	GA	GD	Win %
Super League	23 September 2007	20 April 2008	Matchday 1	2nd	30	22	2	6	65	17	+48	73.33
Super League Play-offs	23 April 2008	14 May 2008	Matchday 1	3rd	6	2	2	2	10	11	−1	33.33
Greek Cup	1 November 2007	9 January 2008	Round of 32	Round of 16	2	1	0	1	2	2	+0	50.00
UEFA Champions League	15 August 2007	3 September 2007	Third qualifying round	Third qualifying round	2	0	0	2	1	6	−5	0.00
UEFA Cup	20 September 2007	21 February 2008	First round	Round of 32	8	2	3	3	8	9	−1	25.00
Total					48	27	7	14	86	45	+41	56.25

Last updated: 14 May 2008
Source: Competitions

=== Super League Greece ===
==== Regular season ====
===== League table =====
Pos	Team	Pld	W	D	L	GF	GA	GD	Pts	Qualification or relegation
1	Olympiacos (Note: The match of Apollon Kalamarias against Olympiacos, originally ended 1–0 to the home side, but later was awarded to Olympiacos 0–3 by the Greek sports court giving Olympiacos the three points, on the basis that the home side fielded an ineligible player (Roman Wallner). Apollon were deducted by one point.) (C)	30	21	7	2	58	23	+35	70	Qualification for the Champions League third qualifying round
2	AEK Athens	30	22	2	6	65	17	+48	68	Qualification for the Play-offs
3	Panathinaikos	30	20	6	4	44	18	+26	66	Qualification for the Play-offs
4	Aris	30	14	8	8	32	20	+12	50	Qualification for the Play-offs
5	Panionios	30	13	6	11	39	42	−3	45 (Note: Head-to-head record: Panionios–AEL 3–1, AEL–Panionios 1–0.)	Qualification for the Play-offs

Source: Super League Greece
Rules for classification: 1st points; 2nd head-to-head points; 3rd head-to-head goal difference; 4th decision match.
According to the official Super League playoff regulation, the position after the playoffs replaces the regular season position.
(C) Champions

===== Results summary =====
Overall								Home						Away					
Pld	W	D	L	GF	GA	GD	Pts	W	D	L	GF	GA	GD	W	D	L	GF	GA	GD
30	22	2	6	65	17	+48	68	11	2	2	38	9	+29	11	0	4	27	8	+19

Last updated: 2008-04-20.
Source: Super League Greece

===== Results by Matchday =====
Round	1	2	3	4	5	6	7	8	9	10	11	12	13	14	15	16	17	18	19	20	21	22	23	24	25	26	27	28	29	30
Ground	A	H	A	A	H	A	H	A	H	A	H	A	A	A	H	A	H	H	A	A	A	H	H	A	H	A	H	H	A	H
Result	W	W	W	W	W	W	L	L	W	W	W	L	W	W	L	W	W	W	L	L	W	D	W	W	D	W	W	W	W	W
Position	1	1	1	1	1	1	1	2	1	1	1	2	1	1	3	1	1	1	3	3	3	3	3	3	3	3	3	2	2	2

Updated to match(es) played on 20 April 2008. Source: slgr.gr
A = Away; H = Home; W = Win; D = Draw; L = Loss; P = Postponed

===== Matches =====
26 September 2007 1	Veria	0–1	AEK Athens	Veria
21:15 EEST (UTC+3)	Mendoza (yellow card) 33'; Samaras (yellow card) 90+2'	Report	Blanco 34'; Manduca (yellow card) 50'; Kone (yellow card) 86'	Stadium: Veria Stadium; Attendance: 3,960; Referee: Dimitris Kalopoulos (Thessaloniki)

23 September 2007 2	AEK Athens	2–0	Atromitos	Marousi
19:00 EEST (UTC+3)	Manú (yellow card) 69'; Blanco 79', 87'; Zikos (yellow card) 80'	Report	Korakakis (yellow card) 52'; Marinos (yellow card) 76'; Rovas (yellow card) 82'	Stadium: Olympic Stadium; Attendance: 18,372; Referee: Iraklis Tsikinis (Messinia)

30 September 2007 3	Levadiakos	0–4	AEK Athens	Levadeia
16:45 EEST (UTC+3)	Popov (yellow card) 22'; Rusev (yellow card) 29'	Report	Tőzsér 31'; Blanco 37'; Manduca (yellow card) 43'; Ratinho 58'; Kone (yellow card) 73', (goal) 77'	Stadium: Levadia Municipal Stadium; Attendance: 3,272; Referee: Anastasios Kakos (Corfu)

7 October 2007 4	Panionios	0–3	AEK Athens	Nea Smyrni
19:00 EEST (UTC+3)	Fernández (yellow card) 24'; Popov (yellow card) 22'; Djebbour (yellow card) 66'; Pletsch (yellow card) 79'	Report	Liberopoulos 11'; Dellas (yellow card) 51'; Ratinho (yellow card) 56'; Rivaldo 79' (pen.); Macho (yellow card) 90+2'; César 90+4'	Stadium: Nea Smyrni Stadium; Attendance: 4,174; Referee: Kyros Vassaras (Thessaloniki)

20 October 2007 5	AEK Athens	1–0	AEL	Marousi
19:00 EEST (UTC+3)	Manduca 4'; Macho (red card) 11'; Zikos (yellow card) 53'; Arruabarrena (yellow card) 75'	Report	Fotakis (yellow card) 8'; Venetidis (yellow card) 56'; Galitsios (yellow card) 81'; Bachramis (yellow card) 82'	Stadium: Olympic Stadium; Attendance: 13,752; Referee: Giorgos Kasnaferis (Argolida)

28 October 2007 6	Skoda Xanthi	0–1	AEK Athens	Xanthi
16:45 EET (UTC+2)	Poy (yellow card) 36'; Papadimitriou (yellow card) 66'	Report	Tőzsér (yellow card) 39'; Blanco 44'; Arruabarrena (yellow card) 53'	Stadium: Skoda Xanthi Arena; Attendance: 3,624; Referee: Michael Koukoulakis (Heraklion)

4 November 2007 7	AEK Athens	1–2	Iraklis	Marousi
19:00 EET (UTC+2)	Liberopoulos 28'; Ratinho (yellow card) 75'	Report	Emerson 9'; Nikolopoulos (yellow card) 39'; Chloros (yellow card) 39'; Mavrogenidis (yellow card) 54'; Zbončák (yellow card) 71'; Raguel (yellow card) 75'; Benko (yellow card) 78'; Rodrigo 82'	Stadium: Olympic Stadium; Attendance: 21,370; Referee: Dimitris Kyrkos (Epirus)

11 November 2007 8	Panathinaikos	2–1	AEK Athens	Marousi
19:00 EET (UTC+2)	Salpingidis 6'; Šerić (yellow card) 22' (yellow-red card) 72'; Mantzios 34'; Karagounis (yellow card) 40'; Mattos (yellow card) 54'; N'Doye (yellow card) 78'; Tziolis (yellow card) 81'; Dimoutsos (yellow card) 90'	Report	Papastathopoulos (yellow card) 22'; Manduca (yellow card) 34'; Liberopoulos 42'; Alves (yellow card) 54'; Dellas (yellow card) 72' (red card) 78'	Stadium: Olympic Stadium; Attendance: 15,202; Referee: Dimitris Kalopoulos (Thessaloniki)

25 November 2007 9	AEK Athens	4–0	OFI	Marousi
19:00 EET (UTC+2)	Lagos (yellow card) 42'; Rivaldo 47'; Manduca 50'; Blanco 62'; Pappas 74'	Report	Drulić (yellow card) 7'; Pitsos (yellow card) 30'; Leozinho (red card) 33'; Roubakis (yellow card) 86'; Arvanitis (yellow card) 90'	Stadium: Olympic Stadium; Attendance: 16,738; Referee: Nathanail Charalambidis (Kavala)

2 December 2007 10	Aris	0–1	AEK Athens	Thessaloniki
19:00 EET (UTC+2)	Nebegleras (yellow card) 62'; Guiaro (yellow card) 67'; Ivić (yellow card) 79'	Report	Zikos (yellow card) 20'; Ratinho (yellow card) 78'; Dellas 82'; Kafes (yellow card) 90+2'	Stadium: Kleanthis Vikelidis Stadium; Attendance: 13,042; Referee: Michael Koukoulakis (Heraklion)

9 December 2007 11	AEK Athens	4–0	Apollon Kalamarias	Marousi
19:00 EET (UTC+2)	Liberopoulos 4', 85'; Rivaldo 16' (pen.); Blanco 40', (yellow card) 41'	Report	Šikov (yellow card) 15'; Karamanlis (yellow card) 47'; Zapropoulos (yellow card) 86'	Stadium: Olympic Stadium; Attendance: 13,375; Referee: Stavros Tritsonis (Athens)

16 December 2007 12	Olympiacos	1–0	AEK Athens	Piraeus
19:00 EET (UTC+2)	Kovačević 83'; Đorđević (yellow card) 56'	Report	Arruabarrena (yellow card) 17'; Rivaldo (yellow card) 45+2'; Manduca (yellow card) 50'; Pappas (yellow card) 55'; Moretto (red card) 90+4'	Stadium: Karaiskakis Stadium; Attendance: 30,229; Referee: Anastasios Kakos (Corfu)

23 December 2007 13	Ergotelis	1–4	AEK Athens	Heraklion
19:00 EET (UTC+2)	Ognjenović 18'; Koiliaras (yellow card) 54'	Report	Dellas 29'; Kafes (yellow card) 37'; Alves (yellow card) 44'; Tőzsér (yellow card) 61'; Manduca 74', (yellow card) 90'; Liberopoulos 90+1', 90+4'	Stadium: Pankritio Stadium; Attendance: 5,940; Referee: Vasilis Paboridis (Kilkis)

30 December 2007 14	AEK Athens	2–0	PAOK	Marousi
19:00 EET (UTC+2)	Blanco 33'; Kafes (yellow card) 34'; Dellas (yellow card) 57'; César 90', (yellow card) 90+1'	Report	Balafas (yellow card) 59'; Vryzas (yellow card) 74'	Stadium: Olympic Stadium; Attendance: 24,257; Referee: Konstantinos Papastamatis (Athens)

6 January 2008 15	Asteras Tripolis	2–1	AEK Athens	Tripoli
16:45 EET (UTC+2)	Psomas (yellow card) 11'; Ofrydopoulos (yellow card) 35'; Filomeno 49'; Martins (yellow card) 62'; Fytanidis (yellow card) 66'; Dondé 68', (yellow card) 69'; Cesarec (yellow card) 70'; Abaris (yellow card) 83'; Massara (yellow card) 84'	Report	Alves (yellow card) 11'; Manduca (yellow card) 39'; Dellas (yellow card) 55'; Blanco 77'; Kafes (yellow card) 90+5'	Stadium: Asteras Tripolis Stadium; Attendance: 4,167; Referee: Kyros Vassaras (Thessaloniki)
Note: AEK had the right to file an objection for the illegal participation of Fyntanidis in the game, however they decided not to so and let the match be decided on the pitch.

12 January 2008 16	AEK Athens	5–1	Veria	Marousi
19:00 EET (UTC+2)	Rivaldo 4'; Kafes 13'; Zikos (yellow card) 15'; Blanco 18' (pen.), 60'; Pavlis 90+2'	Report	Samaras (yellow card) 17'; Tsiblidis (yellow card) 17'; De Lange (yellow card) 69'; Bykowski 37', (yellow card) 77'	Stadium: Olympic Stadium; Attendance: 12,041; Referee: Ilias Mazarakos (Arta)

19 January 2008 17	Atromitos	0–1	AEK Athens	Peristeri
16:45 EET (UTC+2)	Luciano (yellow card) 46'	Report	Liberopoulos 18'; Manú (yellow card) 75'	Stadium: Peristeri Stadium; Attendance: 3,501; Referee: Vasilis Paboridis (Kilkis)

27 January 2008 18	AEK Athens	3–0	Levadiakos	Marousi
19:00 EET (UTC+2)	Nsaliwa (yellow card) 36'; Lagos (yellow card) 43'; Rivaldo 44'; Emeran 53' (o.g.); Blanco 55'	Report	Diamantis (yellow card) 37' (yellow-red card) 45+1'	Stadium: Olympic Stadium; Attendance: 16,168; Referee: Dimitris Kyrkos (Epirus)

3 February 2008 19	AEK Athens	2–3	Panionios	Marousi
19:00 EET (UTC+2)	Pappas (yellow card) 48'; Kallon 60'; Blanco 74'; Kafes (yellow card) 75'; Manú (yellow card) 84'	Report	Djebbour 10'; Choutos 15', 54'; Krešić (yellow card) 34'; Diawara (yellow card) 71'; Aravidis (yellow card) 89'	Stadium: Olympic Stadium; Attendance: 19,926; Referee: Theofilos Fotiadis (Thessaloniki)

9 February 2008 20	AEL	1–0	AEK Athens	Larissa
19:00 EET (UTC+2)	Förster (yellow card) 7'; Parra (yellow card) 10'; Żurawski 77'; Galitsios (yellow card) 86'	Report	Nsaliwa (yellow card) 45'; Alves (yellow card) 55' (yellow-red card) 66'; Papastathopoulos (yellow card) 88'	Stadium: Alkazar; Attendance: 6,778; Referee: Michael Koukoulakis (Heraklion)

17 February 2008 21	AEK Athens	3–0	Skoda Xanthi	Marousi
17:00 EET (UTC+2)	Blanco 6'; Pliatsikas (yellow card) 16'; Dellas (yellow card) 33'; Kafes (yellow card) 52'; César 82', (yellow card) 43'; Edinho 88'	Report	Rikka (yellow card) 32'; Vallas (yellow card) 47'	Stadium: Olympic Stadium; Attendance: 8,594; Referee: Giorgos Daloukas (Thessaly)

24 February 2008 22	Iraklis	0–1	AEK Athens	Thessaloniki
19:00 EET (UTC+2)	Marqués (yellow card) 44'; Perperidis (yellow card) 57'; Mavrogenidis (yellow card) 66'; Dias (yellow card) 67'	Report	Pliatsikas (yellow card) 23'; Dellas (yellow card) 32'; Liberopoulos 46'; Kone (yellow card) 73'; Moretto (yellow card) 80'; Kafes (yellow card) 81'; Zikos (yellow card) 90+5'	Stadium: Kaftanzoglio Stadium; Attendance: 5,971; Referee: Anastasios Kakos (Corfu)

2 March 2008 23	AEK Athens	1–1	Panathinaikos	Marousi
19:00 EET (UTC+2)	Rivaldo 67' (pen.), (yellow card) 86'; Manduca (yellow card) 71'; Liberopoulos (yellow card) 72'; Papastathopoulos (yellow card) 87'	Report	Simão (yellow card) 16'; Morris (yellow card) 76'; Postiga 79'	Stadium: Olympic Stadium; Attendance: 40,610; Referee: Vasilis Paboridis (Kilkis)

9 March 2008 24	OFI	1–4	AEK Athens	Heraklion
16:45 EET (UTC+2)	Issa (yellow card) 18'; Sfakianakis 21', (yellow card) 87'; Arvanitis (yellow card) 35'; Kounenakis (yellow card) 73'	Report	Blanco 16'; Pitsos 18' (o.g.); Kallon (yellow card) 54'; Pliatsikas (yellow card) 61'; Bărcăuan 64' (o.g.); Edinho 80'	Stadium: Pankritio Stadium; Attendance: 4,141; Referee: Giannis Stavridis (Pieria)

16 March 2008 25	AEK Athens	1–1	Aris	Marousi
19:00 EET (UTC+2)	Edinho 45'; Tőzsér (yellow card) 47'; Ratinho (yellow card) 77'	Report	Siston (yellow card) 5'; Aurélio (yellow card) 47'; Thiago (yellow card) 81', (goal) 88'	Stadium: Olympic Stadium; Attendance: 20,976; Referee: Giorgos Kasnaferis (Argolida)

23 March 2008 26	Apollon Kalamarias	0–1	AEK Athens	Thessaloniki
19:00 EET (UTC+2)	Sarakatsanos (yellow card) 42'	Report	Bourbos (yellow card) 25'; Alves (yellow card) 54'; Edinho 56'; Nsaliwa (yellow card) 85'	Stadium: Kalamaria Stadium; Attendance: 2,436; Referee: Giorgos Daloukas (Thessaly)

30 March 2008 27	AEK Athens	4–0	Olympiacos	Marousi
19:00 EEST (UTC+3)	Blanco 10', (yellow card) 11'; Edinho 12', (yellow card) 75'; Dellas (yellow card) 22'; Liberopoulos 32'; Kafes 60'	Report	Belluschi (yellow card) 16'; Ledesma (yellow card) 16'; Đorđević (penalty missed) 48'	Stadium: Olympic Stadium; Attendance: 40,955; Referee: Christoforos Zografos (Athens)

6 April 2008 28	AEK Athens	3–1	Ergotelis	Marousi
19:00 EEST (UTC+3)	Rivaldo 6' (pen.); Georgeas (yellow card) 13'; Bourbos (yellow card) 20'; Kafes 39'; Blanco 51'	Report	Kefaloukos (yellow card) 5'; Koiliaras (yellow card) 17'; Κordonouris 53'; Kenedy (yellow card) 71'	Stadium: Olympic Stadium; Attendance: 18,155; Referee: Anastasios Kakos (Corfu)

13 April 2008 29	PAOK	0–4	AEK Athens	Thessaloniki
19:00 EEST (UTC+3)	Georgiadis (yellow card) 43'; Knol (yellow card) 66'; Iliev (yellow card) 73'	Report	Papastathopoulos 20'; Blanco 23'; Liberopoulos 25'; Edinho (yellow card) 45+2'; Zikos (yellow card) 47'; Kallon 82'	Stadium: Toumba Stadium; Attendance: 11,569; Referee: Dimitris Kyrkos (Epirus)

20 April 2008 30	AEK Athens	2–0	Asteras Tripolis	Marousi
19:00 EEST (UTC+3)	Bourbos (yellow card) 23'; Rivaldo 43', (yellow card) 45+2'; Blanco 56'; Papastathopoulos (yellow card) 65'; Zikos (penalty missed) 86'	Report	Cardozo (yellow card) 23'; Filomeno (yellow card) 65'; Kanakoudis (yellow card) 68'; Ofrydopoulos (yellow card) 85'	Stadium: Olympic Stadium; Attendance: 37,996; Referee: Michael Koukoulakis (Heraklion)

==== Play-offs ====
===== Table =====
Pos	Team	Pld	W	D	L	GF	GA	GD	Pts	Qualification
2	Panathinaikos	6	4	2	0	14	5	+9	21	Qualification for the Champions League second qualifying round
3	AEK Athens	6	2	2	2	10	11	−1	16	Qualification for the UEFA Cup second qualifying round
4	Aris (Note: Aris were guaranteed at least to play in the 2008–09 UEFA Cup second qualifying round through their Greek Cup performance.)	6	1	2	3	9	9	0	7	Qualification for the UEFA Cup second qualifying round
5	Panionios	6	1	2	3	7	15	−8	5	Qualification for the Intertoto Cup second round

Source: Super League Greece
Rules for classification: 1) points; 2) head-to-head points; 3) head-to-head goal difference; 4) head-to-head goals scored; 5) goal difference; 6) number of goals scored.

===== Results summary =====
Overall								Home						Away					
Pld	W	D	L	GF	GA	GD	Pts	W	D	L	GF	GA	GD	W	D	L	GF	GA	GD
6	2	2	2	10	11	−1	16	2	1	0	7	1	+6	0	1	2	3	10	−7

Last updated: 2008-05-14.
Source: Super League Greece

===== Results by Matchday =====
Round	1	2	3	4	5	6
Ground	H	A	H	A	A	H
Result	W	L	W	L	D	D
Position	2	3	3	3	3	3

Updated to match(es) played on 14 May 2008. Source: slgr.gr
A = Away; H = Home; W = Win; D = Draw; L = Loss; P = Postponed

===== Matches =====
23 April 2008 1	AEK Athens	5–0	Panionios	Marousi
21:00 EEST (UTC+3)	Edinho 28', (yellow card) 29'; Rivaldo 39', 77'; Blanco 74'; Kallon 90+1'	Report	Nicolaou (yellow card) 31'; Hetemaj (yellow card) 55'; Gousoulis (yellow card) 81'	Stadium: Olympic Stadium; Attendance: 7,372; Referee: Michalis Germanakos (Athens)

30 April 2008 2	Panathinaikos	4–1	AEK Athens	Marousi
19:00 EEST (UTC+3)	Papadopoulos 8'; Mattos 27'; Ivanschitz 32', 45'; Sarriegi (yellow card) 73'; Tziolis (yellow card) 83'	Report	Kafes (yellow card) 54'; Macho (yellow card) 54'; Nsaliwa (yellow card) 59'; Rivaldo 71'; Papastathopoulos (yellow card) 82'; Kallon (yellow card) 90+5'	Stadium: Olympic Stadium; Attendance: 8,528; Referee: Dimitris Kalopoulos (Thessaloniki)

4 May 2008 3	AEK Athens	1–0	Aris	Marousi
19:00 EEST (UTC+3)	Liberopoulos 54'; Papastathopoulos (yellow card) 61'; Kafes (yellow card) 81'	Report	Aurélio (yellow card) 40'; Ivić (yellow card) 76'	Stadium: Olympic Stadium; Attendance: 9,995; Referee: Giorgos Kasnaferis (Argolida)

7 May 2008 4	Aris	4–0	AEK Athens	Thessaloniki
16:45 EEST (UTC+3)	Nebegleras 6'; Javito 39', 48', (yellow card) 40'; Koke 55'; García (yellow card) 67'	Report	Edinho (yellow card) 74'; Nsaliwa (yellow card) 81'; Papastathopoulos (yellow card) 87' (yellow-red card) 90+2'	Stadium: Kleanthis Vikelidis Stadium; Attendance: 2,257; Referee: Michael Koukoulakis (Heraklion)

11 May 2008 5	Panionios	2–2	AEK Athens	Nea Smyrni
19:00 EEST (UTC+3)	Fernandez 21'; Krešić (yellow card) 24'; Ribeiro (yellow card) 53'; Hetemaj (yellow card) 83'; Majstorović (yellow card) 84' (yellow-red card) 89'; Skoufalis 90'	Report	Rivaldo 25' (pen.); Alves (yellow card) 32'; Liberopoulos 39', (yellow card) 90+3'; Bourbos (yellow card) 42'; Kafes (yellow card) 59' (yellow-red card) 90+2'; Pliatsikas (yellow card) 69'	Stadium: Nea Smyrni Stadium; Attendance: 1,011; Referee: Lazaros Polatian (Pella)

14 May 2008 6	AEK Athens	1–1	Panathinaikos	Marousi
19:00 EEST (UTC+3)	Nsaliwa (yellow card) 45', (goal) 51'; Alves (yellow card) 66'; Manduca (yellow card) 88'	Report	Mattos 26'; N'Doye (yellow card) 37'; Romero (yellow card) 55'; Darlas (red card) 65'; Simão (yellow card) 82'; Dimoutsos (yellow card) 88'	Stadium: Olympic Stadium; Attendance: 5,032; Referee: Kyros Vassaras (Thessaloniki)

=== Greek Cup ===
AEK entered the Greek Cup at the round of 32.

==== Matches ====
1 November 2007 Round of 32	Fostiras	0–2	AEK Athens	Tavros
17:45 EET (UTC+2)	Dimopoulos (yellow card) 10' (yellow-red card) 57'; Vidalis (yellow card) 46'; Boubas (yellow card) 90+1'	Report	Kafes (yellow card) 4'; César 59'; Manú (yellow card) 61'; Papastathopoulos (yellow card) 80'; Kapetanos 86'	Stadium: Tavros Stadium; Attendance: 2,545; Referee: Christoforos Zografos (Athens)

9 January 2008 Round of 16	Skoda Xanthi	2–0	AEK Athens	Xanthi
21:30 EET (UTC+2)	Tziortziopoulos (yellow card) 48'; Radzinski 62'; Papadimitriou (yellow card) 73'; Labriakos 87'	Report	Ramos (yellow card) 28'; Manú (yellow card) 40'; Lyberopoulos (yellow card) 45+1'; Kafes (yellow card) 72'; Alves (yellow card) 77'	Stadium: Skoda Xanthi Arena; Attendance: 3,427; Referee: Lazaros Polatian (Pella)

=== UEFA Champions League ===
==== Third qualifying round ====
The draw for the third qualifying round was held on 3 August 2007.

15 August 2007 First leg	Sevilla (Spain)	2–0	(Greece) AEK Athens	Seville, Spain
21:45 EEST (UTC+3)	Maresca (yellow card) 42'; Fabiano 48'; Kanouté 68'	Report	Arruabarrena (yellow card) 42'; Zikos (yellow card) 90+1'	Stadium: Ramón Sánchez Pizjuán Stadium; Attendance: 34,852; Referee: Ľuboš Micheľ (Slovakia)

3 September 2007 Second leg	AEK Athens (Greece)	1–4 (1–6 agg.)	(Spain) Sevilla	Athens, Greece
21:45 EEST (UTC+3)	Zikos (yellow card) 19'; Bourbos (yellow card) 43'; Manduca (penalty missed) 64'; Papastathopoulos (yellow card) 75'; Rivaldo 82' (pen.)	Report	Fabiano 32' (pen.), 45'; Keita 40'; Kerzhakov 53'	Stadium: Olympic Stadium; Attendance: 37,777; Referee: Paul Allaerts (Belgium)
Note: The match was postponed until 3 September due to the death of Antonio Puerta.

=== UEFA Cup ===
==== First round ====
The draw for the first round was held on 31 August 2007.

20 September 2007 First leg	AEK Athens (Greece)	3–0	(Austria) Red Bull Salzburg	Athens, Greece
19:45 EEST (UTC+3)	Alves 3', (yellow card) 40'; Ratinho (yellow card) 35'; Rivaldo 58'; Nsaliwa (yellow card) 76'; Kone 82'; Liberopoulos (yellow card) 88'	Report	Carboni (yellow card) 38'; Vargas (yellow card) 52' (yellow-red card) 72'; Lokvenc (yellow card) 69'; Zickler (yellow card) 72'	Stadium: Olympic Stadium; Attendance: 25,523; Referee: Mike Dean (England)

4 October 2007 Second leg	Red Bull Salzburg (Austria)	1–0 (1–3 agg.)	(Greece) AEK Athens	Salzburg, Austria
21:45 EEST (UTC+3)	Lokvenc 20'; Dudić (yellow card) 36'	Report	Dellas (yellow card) 29'; Liberopoulos (yellow card) 80'	Stadium: Red Bull Arena; Attendance: 15,000; Referee: Paolo Tagliavento (Italy)

==== Group stage ====
The draw for the group stage was held on 9 October 2007.

Pos	Team	Pld	W	D	L	GF	GA	GD	Pts	Qualification	VIL	FIO	AEK	MLA	ELF
1	(Spain) Villarreal	4	3	1	0	7	3	+4	10	Advance to knockout stage	—	1–1	—	—	2–0
2	(Italy) Fiorentina	4	2	2	0	10	4	+6	8	Advance to knockout stage	—	—	—	2–1	6–1
3	(Greece) AEK Athens	4	1	2	1	4	4	0	5	Advance to knockout stage	1–2	1–1	—	—	—
4	(Czech Republic) Mladá Boleslav	4	1	0	3	5	6	−1	3		1–2	—	0–1	—	—
5	(Sweden) IF Elfsborg	4	0	1	3	3	12	−9	1		—	—	1–1	1–3	—

===== Matches =====
25 October 2007 1	Elfsborg (Sweden)	1–1	(Greece) AEK Athens	Borås, Sweden
21:00 EEST (UTC+3)	Mobaeck 15'; M. Svensson (yellow card) 60'; Keene (yellow card) 90+2'	Report	Pappas 49'	Stadium: Borås Arena; Attendance: 4,175; Referee: Peter Sippel (Germany)

29 November 2007 2	AEK Athens (Greece)	1–1	(Italy) Fiorentina	Athens, Greece
21:00 EET (UTC+2)	Ratinho (yellow card) 12'; Balzaretti 34' (o.g.)	Report	Osvaldo 29'; Krøldrup (yellow card) 66'; Liverani (yellow card) 71'	Stadium: Olympic Stadium; Attendance: 26,836; Referee: Craig Thomson (Scotland)

5 December 2007 3	Mladá Boleslav (Czech Republic)	0–1	(Greece) AEK Athens	Mladá Boleslav, Czech Republic
21:45 EET (UTC+2)	Kysela (yellow card) 38'; Řezníček (yellow card) 41'; Matějovský (yellow card) 73'	Report	Alves (yellow card) 27'; Arruabarrena (yellow card) 29'; Nsaliwa 47'; Tőzsér (yellow card) 65'	Stadium: Městský stadion Attendance: 4,670; Referee: Johan Verbist (Belgium)

20 December 2007 4	AEK Athens (Greece)	1–2	(Spain) Villarreal	Athens, Greece
21:45 EET (UTC+2)	Rivaldo 68'; Papastathopoulos (yellow card) 85'; Kafes (yellow card) 90+4'	Report	Mavuba 40'; Tomasson 69'; Josemi (yellow card) 90+1'; D. López (yellow card) 90+4'	Stadium: Olympic Stadium; Attendance: 16,380; Referee: Gerald Lehner (Austria)

==== Round of 32 ====
The draw for the round of 32 was held on 21 December 2007.

13 February 2008 First leg	AEK Athens (Greece)	1–1	(Spain) Getafe	Athens, Greece
20:00 EET (UTC+2)	Zikos (yellow card) 72'; Blanco 90+3'	Report	Signorino (yellow card) 42'; Hernández (yellow card) 54'; De la Red 86'	Stadium: Olympic Stadium; Attendance: 13,038; Referee: Bertrand Layec (France)

21 February 2008 Second leg	Getafe (Spain)	3–0 (4–1 agg.)	(Greece) AEK Athens	Getafe, Spain
21:45 EET (UTC+2)	Celestini (yellow card) 19'; Granero 45+1'; Contra 82' (pen.); Braulio 84'	Report	Arruabarrena (yellow card) 14'; Nsaliwa (yellow card) 38'; Papastathopoulos (yellow card) 90+2'	Stadium: Coliseum Alfonso Pérez; Attendance: 8,000; Referee: Martin Atkinson (England)

== Statistics ==
=== Squad statistics ===
As of 14 May 2008

No.	Pos	Player	Super League		Super League Play-offs		Greek Cup		Champions League		UEFA Cup		Total	
No.	Pos	Player	Apps	Goals	Apps	Goals	Apps	Goals	Apps	Goals	Apps	Goals	Apps	Goals
Goalkeepers
32	GK	(Brazil) Marcelo Moretto	15	0	1	0	2	0	2	0	5	0	25	0
50	GK	(Austria) Jürgen Macho	17	0	4	0	0	0	0	0	3	0	24	0
84	GK	(Greece) Giannis Arabatzis	0	0	1	0	0	0	0	0	0	0	1	0
Defenders
2	DF	(Brazil) Edson Ratinho	23	1	5	0	2	0	2	0	6	0	38	1
3	DF	(Argentina) Rodolfo Arruabarrena	16	0	0	0	0	0	1	0	8	0	25	0
4	DF	(Portugal) Geraldo Alves	21	0	5	0	1	0	2	0	5	1	34	1
5	DF	(Greece) Traianos Dellas	22	2	2	0	1	0	1	0	6	0	32	2
6	DF	(Greece) Georgios Alexopoulos	0	0	0	0	0	0	0	0	0	0	0	0
14	DF	(Argentina) Federico Azcárate	0	0	1	0	1	0	0	0	0	0	2	0
15	DF	(Greece) Sokratis Papastathopoulos	24	1	4	0	1	0	1	0	7	0	37	1
31	DF	(Greece) Nikolaos Georgeas	6	0	2	0	0	0	0	0	0	0	8	0
Midfielders
1	MF	(Greece) Pantelis Kafes	20	3	5	0	2	0	1	0	7	0	35	3
8	MF	(Canada) Tam Nsaliwa	17	0	5	1	0	0	2	0	8	1	32	2
10	MF	(Brazil) Rivaldo	29	8	6	4	0	0	2	1	6	2	43	15
11	MF	(Brazil) Gustavo Manduca	20	3	2	0	1	0	2	0	7	0	32	3
16	MF	(Greece) Akis Zikos	20	0	0	0	0	0	2	0	2	0	24	0
19	MF	(Greece) Panagiotis Lagos	11	0	4	0	1	0	0	0	1	0	17	0
22	MF	(Greece) Panagiotis Kone	10	1	2	0	2	0	1	0	5	1	20	2
25	MF	(Greece) Vasilios Pliatsikas	8	0	3	0	0	0	0	0	0	0	11	0
27	MF	(Greece) Christos Bourbos	11	0	5	0	2	0	1	0	1	0	20	0
34	MF	(Greece) Panagiotis Tachtsidis	1	0	1	0	1	0	0	0	0	0	3	0
80	MF	(Cyprus) Georgios Tofas	0	0	0	0	0	0	0	0	0	0	0	0
88	MF	(Hungary) Dániel Tőzsér	12	1	2	0	2	0	2	0	6	0	24	1
Forwards
7	FW	(Greece) Charilaos Pappas	8	1	0	0	0	0	1	0	4	1	13	2
9	FW	(Greece) Pantelis Kapetanos	2	0	0	0	1	1	0	0	0	0	3	1
18	FW	(Argentina) Ismael Blanco	28	19	6	1	2	0	0	0	7	1	43	21
20	FW	(Portugal) Manú	13	0	0	0	2	0	0	0	5	0	20	0
26	FW	(Sierra Leone) Mohamed Kallon	8	2	3	1	0	0	0	0	2	0	13	3
33	FW	(Greece) Nikos Liberopoulos	24	11	6	2	1	0	2	0	6	0	39	13
36	FW	(Portugal) Edinho	10	5	5	1	0	0	0	0	0	0	15	6
83	FW	(Greece) Michalis Pavlis	5	1	2	0	0	0	1	0	0	0	8	1
99	FW	(Brazil) Júlio César	17	3	2	0	2	1	2	0	5	0	28	4
Left during Winter Transfer Window
81	DF	(Greece) Xenofon Panos	0	0	0	0	0	0	0	0	0	0	0	0
89	DF	(Greece) Nikos Barboudis	0	0	0	0	0	0	0	0	0	0	0	0
24	MF	(Senegal) El Hadji Diouf	0	0	0	0	0	0	0	0	0	0	0	0
56	MF	(Finland) Përparim Hetemaj	0	0	1	0	0	0	0	0	0	0	1	0

=== Goalscorers ===
As of 14 May 2008
The list is sorted by competition order when total goals are equal, then by position and then by squad number.

Rank	No.	Pos.	Player	Super League	Super League Play-offs	Greek Cup	Champions League	UEFA Cup	Total
1	18	FW	(Argentina) Ismael Blanco	19	1	0	0	1	21
2	10	MF	(Brazil) Rivaldo	8	4	0	1	2	15
3	33	FW	(Greece) Nikos Liberopoulos	11	2	0	0	0	13
4	36	FW	(Portugal) Edinho	5	1	0	0	0	6
5	99	FW	(Brazil) Júlio César	3	0	1	0	0	4
6	1	MF	(Greece) Pantelis Kafes	3	0	0	0	0	3
6	11	MF	(Brazil) Gustavo Manduca	3	0	0	0	0	3
6	23	FW	(Sierra Leone) Mohamed Kallon	2	1	0	0	0	3
9	5	DF	(Greece) Traianos Dellas	2	0	0	0	0	2
9	22	MF	(Greece) Panagiotis Kone	1	0	0	0	1	2
9	7	FW	(Greece) Charilaos Pappas	1	0	0	0	1	2
9	8	MF	(Canada) Tam Nsaliwa	0	1	0	0	1	2
13	15	DF	(Greece) Sokratis Papastathopoulos	1	0	0	0	0	1
13	2	DF	(Brazil) Edson Ratinho	1	0	0	0	0	1
13	88	MF	(Hungary) Dániel Tőzsér	1	0	0	0	0	1
13	83	FW	(Greece) Michalis Pavlis	1	0	0	0	0	1
13	9	FW	(Greece) Pantelis Kapetanos	0	0	1	0	0	1
13	4	DF	(Portugal) Geraldo Alves	0	0	0	0	1	1
Own goals				2	0	0	0	1	3
Totals				64	10	2	1	8	85

=== Assists ===
As of 14 May 2008
The list is sorted by competition order when total assists are equal, then by position and then by squad number.

Rank	No.	Pos.	Player	Super League	Super League Play-offs	Greek Cup	Champions League	UEFA Cup	Total
1	10	MF	(Brazil) Rivaldo	12	1	0	0	0	13
2	33	FW	(Greece) Nikos Liberopoulos	5	0	0	0	1	6
3	18	FW	(Argentina) Ismael Blanco	1	3	0	0	0	4
4	1	MF	(Greece) Pantelis Kafes	3	0	0	0	0	3
4	36	FW	(Portugal) Edinho	3	0	0	0	0	3
4	88	MF	(Hungary) Dániel Tőzsér	2	0	0	0	1	3
4	23	FW	(Sierra Leone) Mohamed Kallon	1	1	0	0	1	3
8	4	DF	(Portugal) Geraldo Alves	2	0	0	0	0	2
8	20	FW	(Portugal) Manú	2	0	0	0	0	2
10	2	DF	(Brazil) Edson Ratinho	1	0	0	0	0	1
10	11	MF	(Brazil) Gustavo Manduca	1	0	0	0	0	1
10	27	MF	(Greece) Christos Bourbos	1	0	0	0	0	1
10	7	FW	(Greece) Charilaos Pappas	1	0	0	0	0	1
10	25	MF	(Greece) Vasilios Pliatsikas	0	1	0	0	0	1
10	83	FW	(Greece) Michalis Pavlis	0	0	0	1	0	1
10	8	MF	(Canada) Tam Nsaliwa	0	0	0	0	1	1
10	99	FW	(Brazil) Júlio César	0	0	0	0	1	1
Totals				35	6	0	1	5	47

=== Clean sheets ===
As of 14 May 2008
The list is sorted by competition order when total clean sheets are equal and then by squad number. Clean sheets in games where both goalkeepers participated are awarded to the goalkeeper who started the game. Goalkeepers with no appearances are not included.

Rank	No.	Player	Super League	Super League Play-offs	Greek Cup	Champions League	UEFA Cup	Total
1	50	(Austria) Jürgen Macho	10	2	0	0	1	13
2	32	(Brazil) Marcelo Moretto	8	0	1	0	1	10
3	84	(Greece) Giannis Arabatzis	0	0	0	0	0	0
Totals			18	2	1	0	2	23

=== Disciplinary record ===
As of 14 May 2008

N	P	Nat.	Name	Super League			Super League Play-offs			Greek Cup			Champions League			UEFA Cup			Total			Notes
N	P	Nat.	Name	Yellow card	Second yellow card	Red card	Yellow card	Second yellow card	Red card	Yellow card	Second yellow card	Red card	Yellow card	Second yellow card	Red card	Yellow card	Second yellow card	Red card	Yellow card	Second yellow card	Red card	Notes
Goalkeepers
32	GK	(Brazil)	Marcelo Moretto	1		1													1		1	
50	GK	(Austria)	Jürgen Macho	1		1	1												2		1	
84	GK	(Greece)	Giannis Arabatzis																			
Defenders
2	DF	(Brazil)	Edson Ratinho	3						1						2			6			
3	DF	(Argentina)	Rodolfo Arruabarrena	3									1			2			6			
4	DF	(Portugal)	Geraldo Alves	5	1		2			1						2			10	1		
5	DF	(Greece)	Traianos Dellas	7		1										1			8		1	
6	DF	(Greece)	Georgios Alexopoulos																			
14	DF	(Argentina)	Federico Azcárate																			
15	DF	(Greece)	Sokratis Papastathopoulos	4			3	1		1			1			2			11	1		
31	DF	(Greece)	Nikolaos Georgeas	2															2			
Midfielders
1	MF	(Greece)	Pantelis Kafes	7			3	1		2						1			13	1		
8	MF	(Canada)	Tam Nsaliwa	2			3									2			7			
10	MF	(Brazil)	Rivaldo	3															3			
11	MF	(Brazil)	Gustavo Manduca	7			1												8			
16	MF	(Greece)	Akis Zikos	5									2			1			8			
19	MF	(Greece)	Panagiotis Lagos	2															2			
22	MF	(Greece)	Panagiotis Kone	3			2												5			
25	MF	(Greece)	Vasilios Pliatsikas	3			1												4			
27	MF	(Greece)	Christos Bourbos	3			1						1						5			
34	MF	(Greece)	Panagiotis Tachtsidis							1									1			
80	MF	(Cyprus)	Georgios Tofas																			
88	MF	(Hungary)	Dániel Tőzsér	3												1			4			
Forwards
7	FW	(Greece)	Charilaos Pappas	2															2			
9	FW	(Greece)	Pantelis Kapetanos																			
18	MF	(Argentina)	Ismael Blanco	3															3			
20	FW	(Portugal)	Manú	3						2									5			
23	FW	(Sierra Leone)	Mohamed Kallon	1			1												2			
33	FW	(Greece)	Nikos Liberopoulos	1			1			1						2			5			
36	FW	(Portugal)	Edinho	2			2												4			
83	FW	(Greece)	Michalis Pavlis																			
99	FW	(Brazil)	Júlio César	2															2			
Left during Winter Transfer window
81	DF	(Greece)	Xenofon Panos																			
89	DF	(Greece)	Nikos Barboudis																			
24	MF	(Senegal)	El Hadji Diouf																			
56	MF	(Finland)	Përparim Hetemaj																			

=== Starting 11 ===
This section presents the most frequently used formation along with the players with the most starts across all competitions.

N.	Formation	Matchday(s)
36	4–4–2	1–20, 22–24, 25–30
7	4–3–3	21, 25
5	4–2–3–1

No.	Nat.	Player	Pos.
50	(Austria)	Jürgen Macho	GK
4	(Portugal)	Geraldo Alves	RCB
5	(Greece)	Traianos Dellas (C)	LCB
15	(Greece)	Sokratis Papastathopoulos	RB
3	(Argentina)	Rodolfo Arruabarrena	LB
8	(Canada)	Tam Nsaliwa	DM
1	(Greece)	Pantelis Kafes	CM
2	(Brazil)	Edson Ratinho	RM
10	(Brazil)	Rivaldo	LM
33	(Greece)	Nikos Liberopoulos	SS
18	(Argentina)	Ismael Blanco	CF

Last updated: 2008-05-14

=== UEFA rankings ===
UEFA team ranking

#	Form	Previous	Country	Team	Ranking
81		89	(Ukraine)	Dnipro Dnipropetrovsk	31.932
82		86	(Austria)	Austria Vienna	31.840
83		69	(Greece)	AEK Athens	31.525
84		77	(Czech Republic)	Slavia Prague	31.496
85		79	(France)	RC Strasbourg	31.380

UEFA country ranking

#	Form	Previous	Country	League	Ranking
12		11	(Ukraine)	Ukrainian Premier League	30.100
13		12	(Belgium)	Jupiler League	26.700
14		15	(Greece)	Super League Greece	25.831
15		13	(Czech Republic)	1. Gambrinus Liga	25.750
16		17	(Switzerland)	Axpo Super League	24.225

Correct as of 27 May 2008

== Awards ==
Player	Pos.	Award	Source
(Greece) Sokratis Papastathopoulos	FW	MVP Award (10th Matchday)	
(Argentina) Ismael Blanco	FW	MVP Award (30th Matchday)	
(Argentina) Ismael Blanco	FW	Super League Top Scorer	
(Argentina) Ismael Blanco	FW	Foreign Player of the Season	
(Greece) Sokratis Papastathopoulos	DF	Young Player of the Season	
