= 2006–07 Olympiacos F.C. season =

Olympiacos
2006–07 season
- Chairman: Sokratis Kokkalis
- Manager: Trond Sollied (until 16 December 2006); Takis Lemonis
- Stadium: Karaiskakis Stadium, Piraeus
- Super League Greece: Winners
- Greek Cup: Quarter-finals
- Champions League: Group Stage
- Top goalscorer: League: Rivaldo (17); All: Rivaldo (18)
- Highest home attendance: 33,500 vs Roma (18 October 2006)
- Lowest home attendance: 15,026 vs Atromitos (18 February 2007)
- Average home league attendance: 22,320
Home colours	Away colours	Third colours

The 2006–07 season was Olympiacos's 48th consecutive season in the Super League Greece and their 81st year in existence. The club were played their 10th consecutive season in the UEFA Champions League. Manager Trond Sollied left the club by mutual consent on December 29, 2006 due to the club's lower-than-expected performance of the team in the UEFA Champions League, and was replaced by Greek Takis Lemonis.

== Players ==
=== First-team squad ===
Squad at end of season

Note: Flags indicate national team as defined under FIFA eligibility rules; some limited exceptions apply. Players may hold more than one non-FIFA nationality.

No.	Pos.	Nation	Player
1	MF	GRE	Pantelis Kafes
2	DF	GRE	Christos Patsatzoglou
3	DF	FRA	Didier Domi
5	DF	GRE	Michalis Kapsis
6	MF	GRE	Ieroklis Stoltidis
7	FW	MEX	Nery Castillo
8	MF	SRB	Miloš Marić
9	FW	CYP	Ioannis Okkas
10	MF	BRA	Rivaldo
11	MF	SRB	Predrag Đorđević
14	DF	POL	Michał Żewłakow
16	MF	CIV	Marco Ne
17	MF	GRE	Giannis Taralidis
18	FW	ECU	Félix Borja
20	FW	ESP	Dani García
21	DF	GRE	Grigorios Georgatos

No.	Pos.	Nation	Player
22	DF	TUR	Erol Bulut
23	FW	CYP	Michalis Konstantinou
27	DF	MAR	Abdeslam Ouaddou
28	MF	GRE	Konstantinos Mendrinos
30	DF	GRE	Anastasios Pantos
32	DF	GRE	Georgios Anatolakis
33	GK	BEL	Erwin Lemmens
34	GK	GRE	Kleopas Giannou
35	DF	GRE	Vasilis Torosidis
36	MF	GRE	Giannoulis Fakinos
40	FW	NGA	Haruna Babangida
55	DF	BRA	Júlio César
71	GK	GRE	Antonios Nikopolidis
74	GK	CRO	Tomislav Butina
77	FW	GRE	Charilaos Pappas
87	GK	GRE	Leonidas Panagopoulos

=== Squad changes during 2006/2007 season ===
In:

- (Croatia) Tomislav Butina
- (Morocco) Abdeslam Ouaddou
- (Ecuador) Felix Borja
- (Ivory Coast) Marco Ne
- (Poland) Michał Żewłakow
- (France) Didier Domi
- (Brazil) Júlio César Santos Correa
- (Greece) Charilaos Pappas return from Apollon Kalamarias
- (Greece) Vasilis Torosidis from Skoda Xanthi (Dec. 2006)

Out:

- (Argentina) Gabriel Schurrer free transfer to Málaga CF
- (Greece) Tasos Kyriakos free transfer to Aris
- (Greece) Spyros Vallas on loan to AEL
- (Greece) Dimitris Mavrogennidis free transfer to Iraklis
- (Greece) Stelios Venetidis free transfer to AEL
- (Brazil) Alexandre Joaquim D'Akol on loan to Kerkyra
- (Ivory Coast) Yaya Touré transferred to AS Monaco
- (Spain) Daniel García Lara free transfer
- (Morocco) Abdeslam Ouaddou free transfer (Dec. 2006)
- (Greece) Athanasios Kostoulas free transfer to Skoda Xanthi

== Club ==
=== The Management ===
Position	Staff
Manager	(Greece) Takis Lemonis
Assistant manager	(Spain) José Segura
Assistant manager	(Greece) Michalis Cavalieris
Club doctor	(Greece) Giannis Anagnostopoulos
Chief scout	(Greece) Antreas Niniadis

Last updated: May 13, 2007
Source: Olympiacos FC

=== Other information ===
Chairman	(Greece) Socratis Kokkalis
Ground (capacity and dimensions)	Karaiskákis Stadium (33,334 / 120x80 m)

Source: Olympiacos FC article about Socratis Kokkalis and Olympiacos FC article about Karaiskákis Stadium

== Competitions ==
=== Overall ===
Competition	Started round	Current position / round	Final position / round	First match	Last match
Super League Greece	—	—	Winner	19 August 2006	13 May 2007
UEFA Champions League	Group Stage	—	Group Stage	12 September 2006	5 December 2006
Greek Cup	4th Round	—	Quarter-finals	5 November 2006	31 January 2007

Updated to match played May 13, 2007
Source: Competitions

=== Super League Greece ===
==== League table ====
Pos	Team	Pld	W	D	L	GF	GA	GD	Pts	Qualification or relegation
1	Olympiacos (C)	30	22	5	3	62	23	+39	71	Qualification for the Champions League group stage
2	AEK Athens	30	18	8	4	60	27	+33	62	Qualification for the Champions League third qualifying round
3	Panathinaikos	30	16	6	8	47	28	+19	54	Qualification for the UEFA Cup first round
4	Aris	30	11	13	6	32	26	+6	46	Qualification for the UEFA Cup first round
5	Panionios	30	12	9	9	33	31	+2	45 (Note: Head-to-head record: PAOK–Panionios 1–1, Panionios–PAOK 3–1.)	Qualification for the UEFA Cup first round

Source: Super League Greece
Rules for classification: 1st points; 2nd head-to-head points; 3rd head-to-head goal difference; 4th decision match.
(C) Champions

==== Results summary ====
Overall								Home						Away					
Pld	W	D	L	GF	GA	GD	Pts	W	D	L	GF	GA	GD	W	D	L	GF	GA	GD
30	22	5	3	62	23	+39	71	13	1	1	35	7	+28	9	4	2	27	16	+11

Last updated: 13 May 2007.
Source: Competitive matches

==== Results by round ====
Round	1	2	3	4	5	6	7	8	9	10	11	12	13	14	15	16	17	18	19	20	21	22	23	24	25	26	27	28	29	30
Ground	H	A	H	A	H	A	A	H	A	H	A	H	A	H	H	A	H	A	H	A	H	H	A	H	A	H	A	H	A	A
Result	W	W	W	W	W	W	L	W	L	W	W	W	W	W	W	D	W	W	W	D	W	W	W	L	W	D	D	W	D	W
Position	2	1	1	1	1	1	1	1	1	1	1	1	1	1	1	1	1	1	1	1	1	1	1	1	1	1	1	1	1	1

Source: Competitive matches
A = Away; H = Home; W = Win; D = Draw; L = Loss

==== Matches ====
All times at EET

19 August 2006 1	Olympiacos	2–1	Skoda Xanthi	Piraeus
19:00	Rivaldo 67', 86'	Report	Barkoglou 5'	Stadium: Karaiskakis Stadium; Attendance: 21,100; Referee: Vasileios Terovitsas

27 August 2006 2	Panionios	0–3	Olympiacos	Athens
21:00		Report	Castillo 6', 42', 90'	Stadium: Nea Smyrni Stadium; Attendance: 5,651; Referee: Kyros Vassaras

9 September 2006 3	Olympiacos	2–0	PAOK	Piraeus
19:00	Konstantinou 7'; Castillo 29'	Report		Stadium: Karaiskakis Stadium; Attendance: 29,140; Referee: Athanassios Briakos

17 September 2006 4	OFI	1–2	Olympiacos	Heraklion
19:00	Ofori-Quaye 29'	Report	Rivaldo 69'; Borja 86'	Stadium: Pankritio Stadium; Attendance: 7,719; Referee: Georgios Kasnaferis

23 September 2006 5	Olympiacos	1–0	AEK Athens	Piraeus
19:00	Emerson 45' (o.g.)	Report		Stadium: Karaiskakis Stadium; Attendance: 29,101; Referee: Kyros Vassaras

1 October 2006 6	Iraklis	0–1	Olympiacos	Thessaloniki
21:00		Report	Marić 25'	Stadium: Kaftanzoglio Stadium; Attendance: 6,519; Referee: Iraklis Tsikinis

22 October 2006 7	Atromitos	1–0	Olympiacos	Athens
16:45	Korakakis 60'	Report		Stadium: Peristeri Stadium; Attendance: 4,076; Referee: Christoforos Zografos

28 October 2006 8	Olympiacos	1–0	Ergotelis	Piraeus
19:00	Rivaldo 59'	Report		Stadium: Karaiskakis Stadium; Attendance: 20,405; Referee: Lazaros Polatian

5 November 2006 9	Panathinaikos	1–0	Olympiacos	Athens
19:00	Kostoulas 48' (o.g.)	Report		Stadium: Olympic Stadium; Attendance: 40,091; Referee: Vasileios Terovitsas

12 November 2006 10	Olympiacos	5–0	Apollon Kalamarias	Piraeus
19:00	Rivaldo 40', 69', 82'; Đorđević 47'; Okkas 71'	Report		Stadium: Karaiskakis Stadium; Attendance: 19,254; Referee: Romanos Kontogiannidis

18 November 2006 11	Aris	2–3	Olympiacos	Thessaloniki
19:00	Koke 30', 44'	Report	Rivaldo 61', 66'; Castillo 81'	Stadium: Kleanthis Vikelidis Stadium; Attendance: 6,915; Referee: Christoforos Zografos

26 November 2006 12	Olympiacos	4–0	AEL	Piraeus
19:00	Babangida 14'; Rivaldo 48'; Borja 65'; Pappas 90+3'	Report		Stadium: Karaiskakis Stadium; Attendance: 22,156; Referee: Anastasios Kakos

2 December 2006 13	Kerkyra	0–2	Olympiacos	Corfu
16:45		Report	Júlio César 37'; Stoltidis 38'	Stadium: Kerkyra Stadium; Attendance: 2,830; Referee: Iraklis Tsikinis

10 December 2006 14	Olympiacos	3–2	Egaleo	Piraeus
19:00	Okkas 61'; Júlio César 82'; Borja 88'	Report	Cesarec 22', 51'	Stadium: Karaiskakis Stadium; Attendance: 16,245; Referee: Romanos Kontogiannidis

16 December 2006 15	Olympiacos	3–0	Ionikos	Piraeus
19:00	Stoltidis 44', 87'; Júlio César 80'	Report		Stadium: Karaiskakis Stadium; Attendance: 17,192; Referee: Dimitrios Kalopoulos

7 January 2007 16	Skoda Xanthi	0–0	Olympiacos	Xanthi
16:45		Report		Stadium: Skoda Xanthi Arena; Attendance: 4,645; Referee: Vasileios Terovitsas

14 January 2007 17	Olympiacos	1–0	Panionios	Piraeus
19:00	Castillo 5'	Report		Stadium: Karaiskakis Stadium; Attendance: 25,157; Referee: Iraklis Tsikinis

21 January 2007 18	PAOK	2–3	Olympiacos	Thessaloniki
19:00	Mięciel 29'; Torghelle 89'	Report	Torosidis 57'; Rivaldo 66'; Castillo 70'	Stadium: Toumba Stadium; Attendance: 23,483; Referee: Georgios Kasnaferis

28 January 2007 19	Olympiacos	4–1	OFI	Piraeus
19:00	Đorđević 31', 42', 90' (pen.); Castillo 59'	Report	Drulić 49'	Stadium: Karaiskakis Stadium; Attendance: 25,517; Referee: Ioannis Stavridis

4 February 2007 20	AEK Athens	3–3	Olympiacos	Athens
19:00	Nikopolidis 29' (o.g.); Konstantinou 48' (o.g.); Kampantais 71'	Report	Đorđević 45'; Rivaldo 45+2'; Júlio César 71'	Stadium: Olympic Stadium; Attendance: 36,122; Referee: Athanassios Briakos

11 February 2007 21	Olympiacos	2–0	Iraklis	Piraeus
19:00	Đorđević 31' (pen.); Castillo 70'	Report		Stadium: Karaiskakis Stadium; Attendance: 15,501; Referee: Michail Koukoulakis

18 February 2007 22	Olympiacos	4–1	Atromitos	Piraeus
19:00	Borja 27'; Rivaldo 35'; Castillo 48'; Pappas 90+1'	Report	Luciano 52' (pen.)	Stadium: Karaiskakis Stadium; Attendance: 15,026; Referee: Konstantinos Papastamatis

25 February 2007 23	Ergotelis	1–2	Olympiacos	Heraklion
16:45	Kiliaras 86'	Report	Pappas 21'; Júlio César 78'	Stadium: Pankritio Stadium; Attendance: 14,960; Referee: Theofilos Fotiadis

4 March 2007 24	Olympiacos	0–1	Panathinaikos	Piraeus
19:00		Report	Papadopoulos 89'	Stadium: Karaiskakis Stadium; Attendance: 30,598; Referee: Georgios Kasnaferis

11 March 2007 25	Apollon Kalamarias	1–2	Olympiacos	Thessaloniki
16:45	Orfanos 14'	Report	Rivaldo 59'; Castillo 73'	Stadium: Kalamaria Stadium; Attendance: 2,090; Referee: Vasileios Arguropoulos

18 March 2007 26	Olympiacos	0–0	Aris	Piraeus
19:00		Report		Stadium: Karaiskakis Stadium; Attendance: 26,087; Referee: Lazaros Polatian

15 April 2007 27	AEL	0–0	Olympiacos	Larissa
19:00		Report		Stadium: Alcazar Stadium; Attendance: 7,839; Referee: Vasilios Terovitsas

22 April 2007 28	Olympiacos	3–1	Kerkyra	Piraeus
19:00	Rivaldo 3'; Đorđević 25' (pen.); Castillo 53'	Report	Flavinho 58'	Stadium: Karaiskakis Stadium; Attendance: 23,655; Referee: Theofilos Fotiadis

29 April 2007 29	Egaleo	1–1	Olympiacos	Athens
19:00	Jančetić 45'	Report	Stoltidis 63'	Stadium: Stavros Mavrothalassitis Stadium; Attendance: 2,412; Referee: Ioannis Stavridis

13 May 2007 30	Ionikos	3–5	Olympiacos	Piraeus
17:00	Natsouras 61'; Fabinho 65'; Makor 85'	Report	Rivaldo 41', 68' (pen.); Okkas 49'; Borja 66'; Mendrinos 76'	Stadium: Neapoli Stadium; Attendance: 351; Referee: Konstantinos Finokaliotis

=== Greek Cup ===
==== Fourth round ====
8 November 2006	Atsalenios	0–2	Olympiacos	Heraklion
19:00 EET		Report	Marić 49'; Pappas 76'	Stadium: Pankritio Stadium; Referee: Charalampos Karatzas (Euboea)

==== Fifth round ====
19 December 2006	Haidari	1–3	Olympiacos	Haidari
19:00	Tournas 5'	Report	Pappas 36'; Borja 67'; Okkas 90+2'	Stadium: Takis Charalambidis Stadium; Referee: Anastasios Kakos

==== Quarter-finals ====
17 January 2007 First leg	PAS Giannina	2–0	Olympiacos	Ioannina
16:00	Kontogoulidis 32'; Domoraud 76'	Report		Stadium: Zosimades Stadium; Referee: Lazaros Polatian

31 January 2007 Second leg	Olympiacos	2–1 (a.e.t.) (2–3 agg.)	PAS Giannina	Piraeus
18:45	Đorđević 61' (pen.); Babangida 73'	Report	Kontogoulidis 98'	Stadium: Karaiskakis Stadium; Referee: Romanos Kontogiannidis

=== UEFA Champions League ===
==== Group stage ====
Pos	Team	Pld	W	D	L	GF	GA	GD	Pts	Qualification
1	(Spain) Valencia	6	4	1	1	12	6	+6	13	Advance to knockout stage
2	(Italy) Roma	6	3	1	2	8	4	+4	10	Advance to knockout stage
3	(Ukraine) Shakhtar Donetsk	6	1	3	2	6	11	−5	6	Transfer to UEFA Cup
4	(Greece) Olympiacos	6	0	3	3	6	11	−5	3	

Source: RSSSF

All times at CET

12 September 2006 1	Olympiacos (Greece)	2–4	(Spain) Valencia	Piraeus, Greece
20:45	Konstantinou 24'; Castillo 66'	Report	Morientes 34', 39', 90'; Albiol 85'	Stadium: Karaiskakis Stadium; Attendance: 33,000; Referee: Terje Hauge (Norway)

27 September 2006 2	Shakhtar Donetsk (Ukraine)	2–2	(Greece) Olympiacos	Donetsk, Ukraine
20:45	Matuzalém 34'; Marica 70'	Report	Konstantinou 24'; Castillo 68'	Stadium: RSC Olimpiyskiy; Attendance: 25,500; Referee: Eric Braamhaar (Netherlands)

18 October 2006 3	Olympiacos (Greece)	0–1	(Italy) Roma	Piraeus, Greece
20:45		Report	Perrotta 76'	Stadium: Karaiskakis Stadium; Attendance: 33,500; Referee: Graham Poll (England)

31 October 2006 4	Roma (Italy)	1–1	(Greece) Olympiacos	Rome, Italy
20:45	Totti 66'	Report	Júlio César 19'	Stadium: Stadio Olimpico; Attendance: 40,000; Referee: Olegário Benquerença (Portugal)

22 November 2006 5	Valencia (Spain)	2–0	(Greece) Olympiacos	Valencia, Spain
20:45	Angulo 45'; Morientes 46'	Report		Stadium: Mestalla Stadium; Attendance: 29,500; Referee: Laurent Duhamel (France)

5 December 2006 6	Olympiacos (Greece)	1–1	(Ukraine) Shakhtar Donetsk	Piraeus, Greece
20:45	Castillo 54'	Report	Matuzalém 27'	Stadium: Karaiskakis Stadium; Attendance: 24,000; Referee: Steve Bennett (England)

== Team kit ==
Supplier: Puma
Sponsor(s): Vodafone

Home	Away	Third	Fourth

Source: Olympiacos FC

== Individual Awards ==
Name	Pos.	Award
(Brazil) Rivaldo	Attacking Midfielder	Super League Greece Best Foreign Player
