= Zapropoulos =

Zapropoulos is a Greek surname. Notable people with the surname include:

- Giannis Zapropoulos (born 1982), Greek footballer
- Nikos Zapropoulos (born 1978), Greek footballer
