= Jürgen Macho =

Austrian footballer and coach

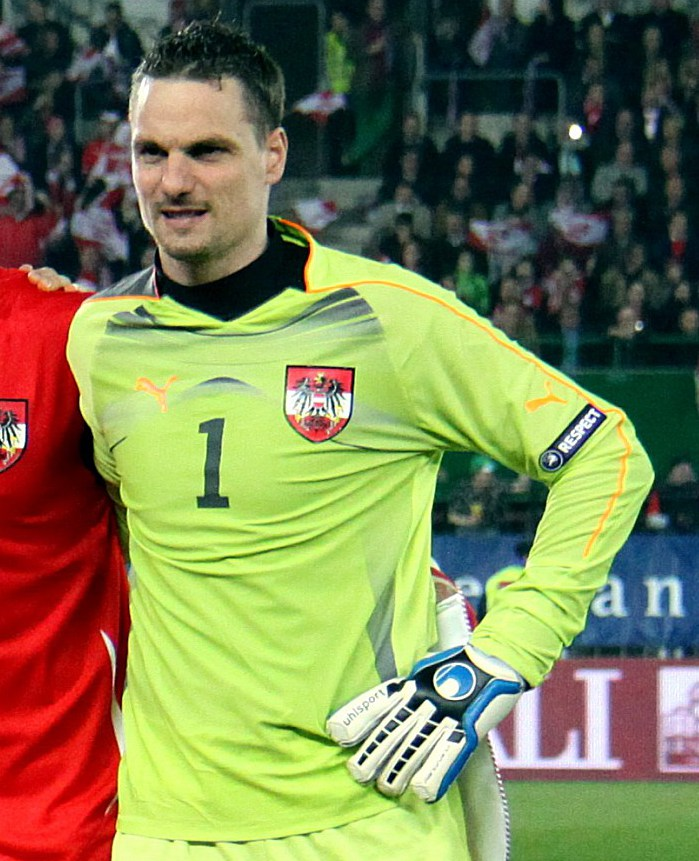
- Macho in 2011

Personal information
- Date of birth: 24 August 1977 (age 49)
- Place of birth: Vienna, Austria
- Height: 1.93 m (6 ft 4 in)
- Position: Goalkeeper

Team information
- Current team: Rapid Wien (goalkeeper coach)

Senior career*
Years	Team	Apps	(Gls)
1996–1997	Wiener Sport-Club		
1997–2000	First Vienna	92	(0)
2000–2003	Sunderland	22	(0)
2003–2004	Chelsea	0	(0)
2004	Rapid Wien	8	(0)
2005–2007	1. FC Kaiserslautern	54	(0)
2007–2009	AEK Athens	18	(0)
2009–2010	LASK	13	(0)
2010–2013	Panionios	27	(0)
2013	Admira Wacker	12	(0)
Total		246	(0)

International career
2001–2002	Austria U21	7	(0)
2002–2011	Austria	26	(0)
- * Club domestic league appearances and goals

Jürgen Macho (born 24 August 1977) is an Austrian football coach and former goalkeeper who is goalkeeper coach of Rapid Wien. During his playing career, he kept goal at several clubs across Austria, England, Germany and Greece.

== Club career ==
Macho started his first-team career with Wiener Sport-Club in 1996, and moved after one season to First Vienna FC, where he spent three seasons before leaving for Premier League club Sunderland in 2000.

At Sunderland, Macho spent three seasons as the second-choice keeper, behind Danish international Thomas Sørensen, and managed a total of 22 league appearances. He then transferred to Chelsea for the 2003–04 season, but was mostly fourth-choice there. He suffered a serious season-long injury, and subsequently failed to make a single competitive appearance with the team.

In August 2004, having been released from the remaining year of his Chelsea contract, Macho left the club to join Austrian Bundesliga side Rapid Wien, on what was scheduled to be a year-long loan deal. However, he spent just four months there, managing eight league appearances, as well as two in the UEFA Cup.

In January 2005, Macho joined Germany's 1. FC Kaiserslautern, where he first spent six months as the third-choice, behind Tim Wiese and Thomas Ernst. However, he managed to become the starter in 2005–06, as Wiese left for Werder Bremen. He subsequently made a total of 20 league appearances that season, but missed nearly the entire second part of the season due to an injury. He continued to be Kaiserslautern's main goalkeeper during 2006–07, with the team now in the second division, to where it was relegated after finishing 16th in the topflight the previous season, being one of those to blame for the team’s poor results.

On 31 August 2007, Macho joined AEK Athens in Greece. He was soon selected as the team's first-choice goalkeeper, ahead of Brazilian Marcelo Moretto. On 26 March 2009, it was announced he would be released from contract after it expired in June.

Macho was in training with Premier League's Wigan Athletic in view to a permanent move, but the transfer was cancelled on 29 September 2009.

On 5 November 2009, after a few months without a club, Macho returned to his country after five years, signing with LASK. At the end of the season, however, he moved to Greece again, joining Panionios.

== International career ==
Macho made his debut for Austria in 2002, going on to amass 26 internationals, including two 2006 FIFA World Cup qualifiers in October 2005.

On 16 November 2007, in a friendly against England, he swallowed his tongue after a collision with Peter Crouch. His life was saved by Austria's chief medic. In UEFA Euro 2008, Macho played all three group stage matches for the hosts, in an eventual group stage exit.

== Career statistics ==
=== Club ===
Appearances and goals by club, season and competition
Club	Season	League			Cup		League Cup		Continental		Other		Total	
Club	Season	Division	Apps	Goals	Apps	Goals	Apps	Goals	Apps	Goals	Apps	Goals	Apps	Goals
First Vienna	1997–98	2. Liga	24	0	2	0	—		—		—		26	0
First Vienna	1998–99	2. Liga	36	0	1	0	—		—		—		37	0
First Vienna	1999–2000	2. Liga	32	0	2	0	—		—		—		34	0
First Vienna	Total		92	0	5	0	—		—		—		97	0
Sunderland	2000–01	Premier League	5	0	0	0	2	0	—		—		7	0
Sunderland	2001–02	Premier League	4	0	0	0	0	0	—		—		4	0
Sunderland	2002–03	Premier League	13	0	1	0	2	0	—		—		16	0
Sunderland	Total		22	0	1	0	4	0	—		—		27	0
Rapid Wien	2004–05	Austrian Bundesliga	8	0	—		—		3 (Note: Appearance(s) in UEFA Cup)	0	—		11	0
1. FC Kaiserslautern	2004–05	Bundesliga	0	0	—		—		—		—		0	0
1. FC Kaiserslautern	2005–06	Bundesliga	20	0	2	0	—		—		—		22	0
1. FC Kaiserslautern	2006–07	2. Bundesliga	34	0	1	0	—		—		—		35	0
1. FC Kaiserslautern	2007–08	2. Bundesliga	0	0	—		—		—		—		0	0
1. FC Kaiserslautern	Total		54	0	3	0	—		—		—		57	0
AEK Athens	2007–08	Super League Greece	21	0	0	0	—		3	0	—		24	0
AEK Athens	2008–09	Super League Greece	1	0	2	0	—		0	0	—		3	0
AEK Athens	Total		22	0	2	0	—		3	0	—		27	0
LASK	2009–10	Austrian Bundesliga	13	0	1	0	—		—		—		14	0
Panionios	2010–11	Super League Greece	27	0	1	0	—		—		—		28	0
Admira Wacker	2012–13	Austrian Bundesliga	12	0	—		—		—		—		12	0
Career total			246	0	13	0	4	0	6	0	0	0	269	0

=== International ===
Appearances and goals by national team and year
National team	Year	Apps	Goals
Austria	2002	1	0
Austria	2004	0	0
Austria	2005	3	0
Austria	2006	4	0
Austria	2007	5	0
Austria	2008	4	0
Austria	2009	1	0
Austria	2010	5	0
Austria	2011	3	0
Total		26	0

== Honours ==
- Rapid Wien:
  - Austrian League: 2004–05
