= Federico Azcárate =

Argentine footballer

Personal information
- Full name: Federico Xavier Azcárate Ochoa
- Date of birth: 15 June 1984 (age 42)
- Place of birth: Balcarce, Argentina
- Height: 1.90 m (6 ft 3 in)
- Position: Centre back

Senior career*
Years	Team	Apps	(Gls)
2002–2003	Cartagena	24	(1)
2003–2005	Murcia	9	(0)
2005–2007	Atlético Madrid B	51	(4)
2007–2008	AEK Athens	3	(0)
2008–2010	Poli Ejido	37	(3)
2010–2012	Leganés	43	(0)
2013–2015	Santamarina	58	(2)
2016–2017	Douglas Haig	32	(1)
2018	Cipolletti	6	(0)
- * Club domestic league appearances and goals as of 2 September 2018

Federico Xavier Azcárate Ochoa (born 15 June 1984) is an Argentine former footballer who played as a central defender.

== Club career ==
Born in Balcarce, Buenos Aires, Azcárate moved as a youngster to Spain, first representing lowly FC Cartagena. In 2003, he joined newly promoted club Real Murcia, but would only appear in a combined nine games over two seasons, the first spent in La Liga and the second in the second division.

From 2005 to 2007, Azcárate represented Atlético Madrid, but never made it past their reserves which competed in the third level. After spending an unassuming campaign in Greece with AEK Athens he returned to Spain, joining third-tier Polideportivo Ejido.

In 2010, after two seasons in Andalusia, Azcárate switched to another team in that league, CD Leganés. He was released at the end of 2011–12.
