= Flavinho (footballer, born 1981) =

Brazilian footballer

Personal information
- Full name: Flavio Silveiro Jose de Carvalho
- Date of birth: 20 June 1981 (age 45)
- Place of birth: Rio de Janeiro, Brazil
- Height: 1.80 m (5 ft 11 in)
- Position: Midfielder

Senior career*
Years	Team	Apps	(Gls)
2001–2004	Cabofriense		
2004–2005	Americano		
2005–2011	Kerkyra	82	(13)
- * Club domestic league appearances and goals

Flávio Silveiro José de Carvalho (born 20 June 1981), known as just Flavinho, is a Brazilian football player who last played for Greek club Kerkyra.
