= Hrvoje Jančetić =

Croatian footballer

Personal information
- Date of birth: 10 February 1981 (age 45)
- Place of birth: Zagreb, SFR Yugoslavia
- Height: 1.75 m (5 ft 9 in)
- Position: Right back

Youth career
- NK Zagreb

Senior career*
Years	Team	Apps	(Gls)
2000–2003	NK Zagreb	0	(0)
2001–2002	→ TŠK Topolovac (loan)	4	(0)
2003–2004	Győri ETO	8	(0)
2004–2006	Međimurje	44	(1)
2006–2008	Egaleo	28	(1)
2008–2012	Inter Zaprešić	51	(0)
2012–2018	Gorica	151	(13)
2018–2019	Zelina		

International career^{‡}
2001	Croatia U-20	4	(0)
- * Club domestic league appearances and goals as of 26 August 2022 ‡ National team caps and goals as of 10:12, 18 October 2009 (UTC)

Hrvoje Jančetić (born 10 February 1981 in Zagreb) is a Croatian retired football player.
