= Giannis Papadimitriou =

Greek footballer and sports director

Personal information
- Full name: Ioannis Papadimitriou
- Date of birth: 15 May 1976 (age 50)
- Place of birth: Chalcis, Greece
- Height: 1.72 m (5 ft 7 1/2 in)
- Position: Right-back

Senior career*
Years	Team	Apps	(Gls)
1994–1995	Chalkida	59	(1)
1995–2010	Skoda Xanthi	284	(4)

International career
1999	Greece	5	(0)
- * Club domestic league appearances and goals as of 17 July 2009

Giannis Papadimitriou (Greek: Γιάννης Παπαδημητρίου; born 15 May 1976) is a Greek former professional footballer who played as a right-back.

As a player he was present for key moments of the club ( final four of the Cup - 3 times Europa League ) and also as sport director one more time in Europe ( 2013–2014) and the 1 st time in the final of the Greek Cup (2014–15) . At his moment as sport director important coaches work for the club ( Ouzounidis- Lucescu R. -Rastavac ) .
