= Giannis Fysekis =

Greek footballer

Personal information
- Full name: Ioannis Fysekis
- Date of birth: 10 October 1985 (age 41)
- Place of birth: Thessaloniki, Greece
- Height: 1.97 m (6 ft 6 in)
- Position: Goalkeeper

Team information
- Current team: Ginásio Clube Alcobaça
- Number: 99

Youth career
- 2000–2005: Doxa Trilofo

Senior career*
Years	Team	Apps	(Gls)
2005–2006	Ethnikos Alexandroupoli	32	(0)
2006–2009	AEK Athens	1	(0)
2006–2007	→ Anagennisi Karditsa (loan)	6	(0)
2007–2008	→ Anagennisi Karditsa (loan)	3	(0)
2008	→ Lamia (loan)	22	(0)
2008–2009	→ Apollon Kalamarias (loan)	1	(0)
2009–2010	P.A.O.N.E.	16	(0)
2009–2010	Panserraikos	0	(0)
2010–2014	Ethnikos Alexandroupoli	84	(0)
2015–2016	Aris	17	(0)
2021–	Ginásio Alcobaça	0	(0)
- * Club domestic league appearances and goals

Giannis Fysekis (Greek: Γιάννης Φυσέκης; born 10 October 1985) is a Greek professional footballer who plays as a goalkeeper for Ginásio Clube Alcobaça.

== Career ==
Fysekis has been playing in the lower divisions of Greek football with P.A.O.N.E. since June 2010. From January through June 2010, he played for Greek second division side Panserraikos F.C. Before that, he had played for P.A.O.N.E. in the Greek Gamma Ethniki.

For the 2007–08 season, Fysekis was loaned out by AEK Athens F.C. to the Greek Third Division club, Anagennisi Karditsa, and then to the Greek Third Division Club, PAE AS Lamia. He was later loaned out to Apollon Kalamarias F.C. during the 2008–09 season.

On 16 June 2009, Giannnis Fysekis' contract with AEK was terminated
