= Manú (footballer) =

Portuguese footballer (1982–2026)

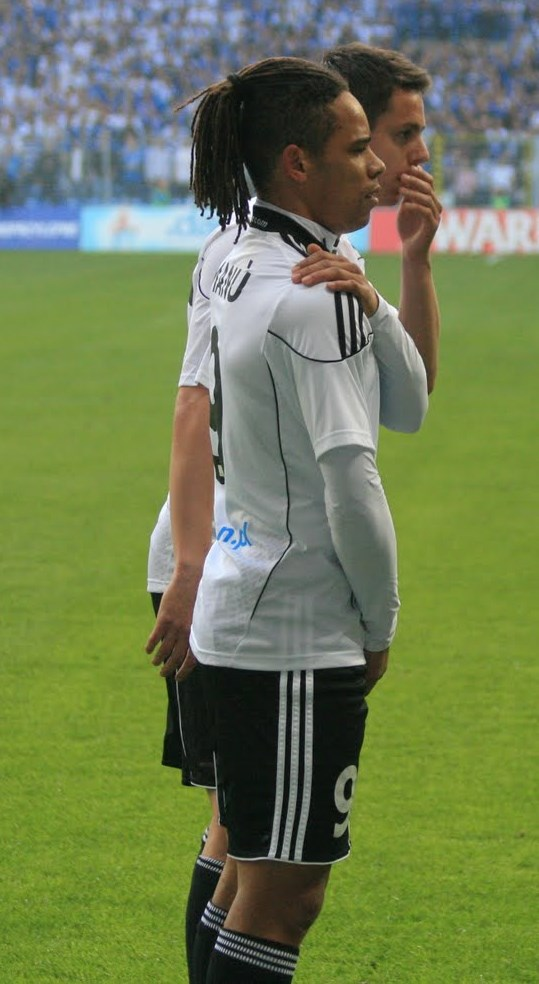
- Manú with Legia Warsaw in 2011

Personal information
- Full name: Emanuel de Jesus Bonfim Evaristo
- Date of birth: 28 August 1982
- Place of birth: Setúbal, Portugal
- Date of death: 11 July 2026 (aged 43)
- Place of death: Sobral de Monte Agraço, Portugal
- Height: 1.71 m (5 ft 7 in)
- Position: Winger

Youth career
- 1992–1998: Vitória Setúbal
- 1998–1999: O Sindicato
- 1999–2001: Alverca

Senior career*
Years	Team	Apps	(Gls)
2001–2004	Alverca	42	(3)
2004–2008	Benfica	11	(0)
2004	→ Modena (loan)	5	(0)
2005	→ Carpenedolo (loan)	14	(2)
2005–2006	→ Estrela Amadora (loan)	31	(7)
2007–2008	→ AEK Athens (loan)	13	(0)
2008–2010	Marítimo	52	(4)
2010–2011	Legia Warsaw	33	(3)
2012	Beijing Guoan	7	(1)
2014	Ermis Aradippou	10	(1)
2014–2015	Vitória Setúbal	11	(0)
2015	Ermis Aradippou	15	(3)
2018	Cartaxo	11	(3)
2019	Vilafranquense	4	(0)
Total		259	(27)
- * Club domestic league appearances and goals

Emanuel de Jesus Bonfim Evaristo (28 August 1982 – 11 July 2026), known as Manú, was a Portuguese professional footballer who played mainly as a winger.

He appeared in 129 Primeira Liga matches over seven seasons, totalling 13 goals for Alverca, Estrela da Amadora, Benfica, Marítimo and Vitória de Setúbal. He also played in Italy, Greece, Poland, China and Cyprus, winning the Polish Cup with Legia Warsaw.

== Career ==
Born in Setúbal, Manú started his professional career in the 2001–02 season with Alverca, before signing for Benfica in 2004 on a four-year contract. He was immediately loaned after arriving, serving stints at Italian clubs Modena and Carpenedolo to gain experience, and returned to Portugal in the 2005–06 campaign for another temporary spell with Estrela da Amadora, where he played 31 league games and scored seven goals as the side retained their Primeira Liga status.

Manú was given a new four-year deal in June 2006, and made his official debut for Benfica by featuring in both legs of the 4–1 aggregate win over Austria Wien in the third qualifying round of the UEFA Champions League. He also made a substitute appearance in the group stage against Copenhagen on 13 September (0–0 away draw).

In summer 2007, Super League Greece team AEK Athens signed Manú on a one-year loan. He went back to Lisbon afterwards, being immediately transferred to Marítimo.

Manú scored his first goal for the Madeirans on 7 October 2008, in the 2–0 away victory over Vitória de Setúbal. In his second year, he appeared even more as a starter as the side qualified for the UEFA Europa League as fifth. On 1 November 2009, he netted from 30 meters to put Marítimo ahead at Sporting CP in an eventual 1–1 draw.

On 9 June 2010, Manú agreed to a three-year deal with Legia Warsaw in Poland. On 3 May of the following year, he equalised the final of the Polish Cup against Lech Poznań, which secured his team extra time and then a 5–4 penalty shootout triumph for the 14th in the club's history.

On 9 December 2011, Manú signed a "1+1" contract with Beijing Guoan in China, effective as of January 2012. Until his retirement aged 36, he represented Ermis Aradippou – Cypriot First Division, two spells– Vitória Setúbal and amateurs Cartaxo and Vilafranquense.

== Death ==
Manú died on 11 July 2026 at the age of 43 in a traffic collision near Sobral de Monte Agraço in Lisbon District, with his first club Alverca confirming his death and Benfica issuing a statement of condolence.

== Career statistics ==
Appearances and goals by club, season and competition
Club	Season	League			Cup (Note: Includes Taça de Portugal, Taça da Liga, Polish Cup and Cypriot Cup)		Other		Total	
Club	Season	Division	Apps	Goals	Apps	Goals	Apps	Goals	Apps	Goals
Alverca	2001–02	Primeira Liga	1	1	1	0	—		2	1
Alverca	2002–03	Primeira Liga	18	1	2	0	—		20	1
Alverca	2003–04	Primeira Liga	23	1	1	0	—		24	1
Alverca	Total		42	3	4	0	0	0	46	3
Benfica	2006–07	Primeira Liga	11	0	2	0	3 (Note: Appearances in UEFA Champions League)	0	16	0
Carpenedolo (loan)	2004–05	Serie D	14	2			—		14	2
Modena (loan)	2004–05	Serie B	5	0			—		5	0
Estrela Amadora (loan)	2005–06	Primeira Liga	31	7	1	0	—		32	7
AEK Athens (loan)	2007–08	Super League Greece	13	0			—		13	0
Marítimo	2008–09	Primeira Liga	25	1	4	1	2 (Note: Appearances in UEFA Cup/UEFA Europa League)	0	31	2
Marítimo	2009–10	Primeira Liga	27	3	3	0	—		30	3
Marítimo	Total		52	4	7	1	2	0	61	5
Legia Warsaw	2010–11	Ekstraklasa	27	1	7	1	—		34	2
Legia Warsaw	2011–12	Ekstraklasa	6	2	1	0	5	0	12	2
Legia Warsaw	Total		33	3	8	1	5	0	46	4
Beijing Guoan	2012	Chinese Super League	7	1			—		7	1
Ermis Aradippou	2013–14	Cypriot First Division	10	1	4	0	—		14	1
Vitória Setúbal	2014–15	Primeira Liga	11	0	2	0	—		13	0
Ermis Aradippou	2014–15	Cypriot First Division	15	3	2	0	—		17	3
Career total			244	24	30	2	10	0	284	26

== Honours ==
Legia Warsaw

- Polish Cup: 2010–11, 2011–12
