= Georgios Tofas =

Cypriot footballer

Personal information
- Full name: Georgios Tofas
- Date of birth: June 17, 1989 (age 37)
- Place of birth: Larnaka, Cyprus
- Height: 1.81 m (5 ft 11 1/2 in)
- Position: Striker

Youth career
- 2004–2007: Enosis Paralimni

Senior career*
Years	Team	Apps	(Gls)
2006–2007	Enosis Paralimni	9	(0)
2007–2009	AEK Athens	4	(1)
2007	→ Ethnikos Piraeus (loan)	1	(0)
2008–2009	→ Anagennisi Karditsa (loan)	3	(1)
2009	→ Anorthosis (loan)	8	(2)
2009–2010	Anorthosis	16	(1)
2010–2011	Queens Park Rangers	1	(0)
2011–2012	Anagennisi Dherynia	9	(0)
2012–2014	Enosis Paralimni	21	(4)
2014–2016	Ermis Aradippou	4	(0)
2016–	Rigas Fereos FC		

International career^{‡}
- Cyprus U21
- * Club domestic league appearances and goals as of 8 May 2010 ‡ National team caps and goals as of 19 May 2012

Georgios Tofas (born 17 June 1989) is a Cypriot footballer who played for Enosis Neon Paralimni as a striker.

== Career ==
Tofas made his debut for Enosis Paralimni first team at 15, he was then called into the Cyprus U16 squad. He made nine substitute appearances for Paralimni in the 2006–07 season.

Aged 17, he signed for AEK Athens for two years, he went straight into the first team squad and trained with players like Rivaldo, Akis Zikos, where he impressed the then coach Lorenzo Serra Ferrer the former Barcelona coach. He then progressed to play for Cyprus at all levels up to under-21 from under-16.

He was spotted playing mostly in AEK Athens U-21 team and went to Middlesbrough in January 2009 and after a week's trial was promptly offered a loan contract until the end of the season with a view to buy him, but this fell through. He then signed for Anorthosis in January with the same deal as he was offered at Middlesbrough; a loan until the end of the season.

On 2 November 2010, Tofas signed for Queens Park Rangers (QPR) on a deal until the end of the 2010–11 season. He made his debut for QPR against Norwich City on 1 January 2011.

He was promoted to Premier League with QPR as champions of the Football League Championship in the 2010–11 season. On 1 June 2011, Tofas was one of eight players to be released by QPR manager, Neil Warnock.
