= Marcelo Moretto =

Brazilian footballer

Personal information
- Full name: Marcelo Moretto de Souza
- Date of birth: 10 May 1978 (age 48)
- Place of birth: Eldorado, Brazil
- Height: 1.96 m (6 ft 5 in)
- Position: Goalkeeper

Senior career*
Years	Team	Apps	(Gls)
1998	São José	0	(0)
1998–2003	Portuguesa	13	(0)
1999	→ Londrina (loan)	0	(0)
2001	→ Sport Recife (loan)	6	(0)
2002	→ Brasiliense (loan)	0	(0)
2004	15 de Novembro		
2004–2005	Felgueiras	8	(0)
2005–2006	Vitória Setúbal	23	(0)
2006–2009	Benfica	19	(0)
2007–2008	→ AEK Athens (loan)	16	(0)
2010–2011	Olhanense	13	(0)
2011	Arka Gdynia	14	(0)
2011–2012	Avaí	19	(0)
2013	Atlético Sorocaba	13	(0)
2013–2014	América-MG	2	(0)
2015–2016	Miami Dade		
2017	Portuguesa-RJ	0	(0)
Total		146	(0)
- * Club domestic league appearances and goals

Marcelo Moretto de Souza (born 10 May 1978), known as Moretto, is a Brazilian former professional footballer who played as a goalkeeper.

== Club career ==
=== Early years ===
Born in Eldorado, Mato Grosso do Sul, Moretto represented São José Esporte Clube, Associação Portuguesa de Desportos, Londrina Esporte Clube, Sport Club do Recife, Brasiliense Futebol Clube and Clube 15 de Novembro in his home country. In 2003, aged 25, he moved to Portugal, signing for S.C. Salgueiros in the Segunda Liga and making a very good first impression during pre-season; however, facing serious economic problems, the club was relegated to the third division and lost all of its professional players.

Moretto then joined F.C. Felgueiras also in the second tier. There, he played eight matches and conceded ten goals.

=== Vitória Setúbal ===
In January 2005, Moretto moved to Vitória F.C. of the Primeira Liga on a two-and-a-half-year contract, replacing Fulham-bound Ricardo Batista. He soon became first choice while the team performed above all expectations, winning the Taça de Portugal after beating S.L. Benfica in the final.

In the first part of the 2005–06 season, Moretto appeared in 17 matches and conceded only five goals; however, both Vitória coach Luís Norton de Matos and some players resigned shortly after due to unpaid wages, as he was by then the goalkeeper with the fewest goals conceded per minute in all European leagues.

=== Benfica ===
In December 2005, speculation arose regarding Moretto's transfer to Benfica or FC Porto. In a controversial move, he joined the former following allegedly "bad behaviour" from both his agent and the latter club's board of directors; he agreed to a deal until June 2011, for €1 million.

When Moretto arrived at the Estádio da Luz, both José Moreira and Quim were injured, so he was immediately inserted in manager Ronald Koeman's starting XI. He made 23 appearances in all competitions until the end of the campaign (18 in the league, one in the cup and four in the UEFA Champions League, conceding no goals against reigning champions Liverpool in the round of 16 and being voted Player of the match in the quarter-finals first leg against FC Barcelona).

Moretto did not have an easy time after joining Benfica because, alternating above-average performances with subpar ones, he suffered from the animosity of their supporters, which undermined his concentration. Following the departure of Koeman and arrival of his replacement Fernando Santos, he was relegated to the role of substitute, with Quim again becoming the starter; during 2006–07 he played only once, often splitting the bench with Moreira.

On 13 July 2007, Moretto agreed to a loan at AEK Athens F.C. of Super League Greece, with an option to make the move permanent.

=== Later career ===
On 3 August 2009, Benfica released Moretto, with the player planning to return to Brazil. Later that year he returned to Brasiliense, now in the Série B.

Moretto went back to Portugal and its top flight in July 2010, signing with lowly S.C. Olhanense for two years. In the following transfer window, however, he changed teams – and countries – again, joining Arka Gdynia from Poland.

== Personal life ==
Moretto's younger brother, André (born 1987), was also a footballer and a goalkeeper. He was under contract with Vitória de Setúbal for several years as well, but never represented the first team.

Gustavo Manduca, who shared teams with him at Benfica, was Moretto's brother-in-law.

== Career statistics ==
Appearances and goals by club, season and competition
Club	Season	League			National cup		League cup		Continental		Other (Note: Includes the Campeonato Carioca, Campeonato Catarinense and Supertaça Cândido de Oliveira)		Total	
Club	Season	Division	Apps	Goals	Apps	Goals	Apps	Goals	Apps	Goals	Apps	Goals	Apps	Goals
São José	1998						—		—					
Portuguesa	1998	Série A	0	0			—		—				0	0
Portuguesa	1999	Série A	0	0			—		—				0	0
Portuguesa	2000	Série A	10	0			—		—				10	0
Portuguesa	2002	Série A	3	0			—		—				3	0
Portuguesa	2003	Série B	0	0			—		—				0	0
Portuguesa	Total		13	0			—		—				13	0
Londrina (loan)	1999	Série B	0	0			—		—				0	0
Sport (loan)	2001	Série A	6	0			—		—				6	0
Brasiliense (loan)	2002	Série C					—		—					
15 Novembro	2004						—		—					
Felgueiras	2004–05	Segunda Liga	8	0	1	0	—		—		—		9	0
Vitória Setúbal	2004–05	Primeira Liga	8	0	2	0	—		—		—		10	0
Vitória Setúbal	2005–06	Primeira Liga	15	0	0	0	—		2	0	1	0	18	0
Vitória Setúbal	Total		23	0	2	0	—		2	0	1	0	28	0
Benfica	2005–06	Primeira Liga	18	0	1	0	—		4	0	—		23	0
Benfica	2006–07	Primeira Liga	1	0	0	0	—		1	0	—		2	0
Benfica	2008–09	Primeira Liga	0	0	1	0	3	0	0	0	—		4	0
Benfica	Total		19	0	2	0	3	0	5	0	—		29	0
AEK Athens (loan)	2007–08	Super League Greece	16	0			—		7	0	—		23	0
Olhanense	2010–11	Primeira Liga	13	0	0	0	0	0	—		—		13	0
Arka Gdynia	2010–11	Ekstraklasa	14	0	—		—		—		—		14	0
Avaí	2011	Série A	3	0	—		—		—		—		3	0
Avaí	2012	Série B	16	0	—		—		—		11	0	27	0
Avaí	Total		19	0	—		—		—		11	0	30	0
Atlético Sorocaba	2013		13	0	—		—		—		—		0	0
América	2013	Série B	2	0	0	0	—		—		—		2	0
Miami Dade	2015						—		—		—			
Miami Dade	2016						—		—		—			
Miami Dade	Total						—		—		—			
Portuguesa-RJ	2017	Série D	0	0	0	0	—		—		8	0	8	0
Career total			146	0	5	0	3	0	14	0	20	0	188	0

== Honours ==
Vitória Setúbal

- Taça de Portugal: 2004–05

Benfica

- Taça da Liga: 2008–09
