= Giannis Zapropoulos =

Greek footballer (born 1982)

Personal information
- Full name: Ioannis Zapropoulos
- Date of birth: 20 March 1982 (age 44)
- Place of birth: Chalastra, Thessaloniki, Greece
- Height: 1.84 m (6 ft 1/2 in)
- Positions: Centre back; defensive midfielder

Team information
- Current team: Ionikos

Senior career*
Years	Team	Apps	(Gls)
2002–2005	Kalamata	46	(1)
2005–2007	Egaleo	27	(1)
2007–2008	Apollon Kalamarias	19	(0)
2008–2009	Ethnikos Piraeus	20	(1)
2009–2010	Panserraikos	16	(0)
2010–	Ionikos	0	(0)
- * Club domestic league appearances and goals as of 31 July 2010

Giannis Zapropoulos (Greek: Γιάννης Ζαπρόπουλος; born 20 March 1982) is a Greek football defender who plays for Ionikos F.C. in the Beta Ethniki.

== Professional career ==
Zapropoulos made his professional debut in the 2002–03 season with B' Ethniki side Kalamata. Over the next two seasons he became a fixture in the Kalamata defense, playing 44 matches.

His good performances with Kalamata earned him a transfer to A' Ethniki in the summer of 2005, when he signed a 2-year contract with Egaleo. Zapropoulos made 25 starts and 27 total appearances in his first season in the top flight, while Egaleo finished 10th in the league. The following season though Zapropoulos was relegated to the bench as a result of a contract dispute.

Zapropoulos' contract with Egaleo expired at the end of the 2006–07 season, and he thereafter signed a 1-year contract with another with A' Ethniki club, Apollon Kalamarias. Zapropoulos made 11 starts and 19 total appearances, playing primarily as a defensive midfielder. Kalamaria was relegated to B' Ethniki at the end of the season.

Free from Kalamaria, in July 2008 Zapropoulos signed a 2-year contract with ambitious B' Ethniki side Ethnikos Piraeus.
