= Charilaos Pappas =

Greek footballer (born 1983)

Charis Pappas
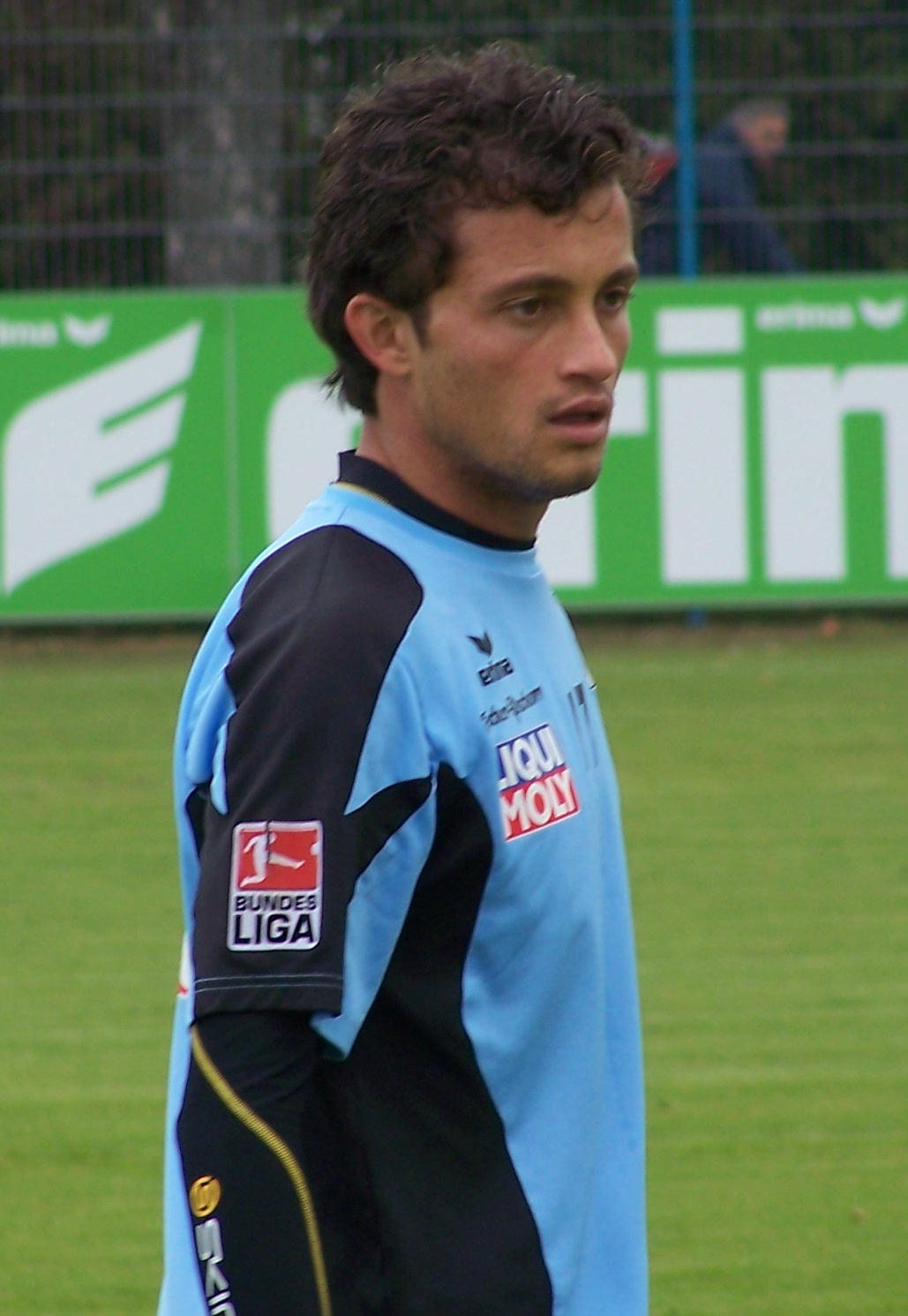
- Pappas with 1860 Munich in 2009

Personal information
- Full name: Charilaos Pappas
- Date of birth: 12 May 1983 (age 43)
- Place of birth: Kavala, Greece
- Height: 1.70 m (5 ft 7 in)
- Position: Right winger

Youth career
- 2001: Orfeas Eleftheroupolis

Senior career*
Years	Team	Apps	(Gls)
2001–2002	Panserraikos	20	(1)
2003–2005	Apollon Kalamarias	66	(17)
2005–2007	Olympiacos	17	(3)
2005–2006	→ Apollon Kalamarias (loan)	28	(7)
2007–2008	AEK Athens	8	(2)
2008–2009	Skoda Xanthi	20	(2)
2009–2010	1860 Munich	23	(3)
2010–2011	Panetolikos	29	(2)
2012–2012	Panserraikos	9	(0)
2012–2013	Olympiakos Volos	8	(0)
2013	Niki Volos	21	(3)
2013–2014	KFC Uerdingen 05	9	(1)
2014–2017	Kavala	55	(7)

International career
2002	Greece U-19	1	(0)
2002–2005	Greece U-21	13	(2)
- * Club domestic league appearances and goals

Charilaos "Charis" Pappas (Greek: Χαρίλαος "Χάρης" Παππάς; born 12 May 1983) is a Greek former professional footballer who played as a right winger.

== Club career ==
He began his career in Panserraikos. In January 2003, he moved to Thessaloniki and signed for Apollon Kalamarias. In 2003–04, Pappas' ten goals were a major factor in Kalamaria's winning promotion to the Alpha Ethniki. In his first season in the Greek top flight in 2004–05, Pappas scored six times in 26 matches. Three of these goals came in away matches, where Kalamaria earned crucial points and ultimately prevailed in their battle against relegation. That season, he scored his first goal for his country in the UEFA European U21 Championship qualifier against Albania in March 2005.

Olympiacos signed him to a five-year deal and immediately loaned him back to Kalamaria for one season. In 2005–06, Pappas scored seven times, helping his team finish ninth in the Alpha Ethniki.

Pappas joined Olympiacos in June. On 8 November 2006, he scored his first goal for the club in a Greek Cup match against Atsalenios FC. On 26 November 2006, he scored his first league goal for Olympiacos against AEL. On 27 June 2007, he signed with AEK Athens.

After a mediocre season, Pappas joined fellow Super League Greece team Skoda Xanthi on 6 July 2008. On 23 June 2009, Pappas transferred to TSV 1860 Munich. On 31 July 2010, he signed with Super League team Panetolikos. In February 2011, he returned to Panserraikos helping his team to avoid relegation. He then moved to KFC Uerdingen 05. At the beginning of 2014–15 season he signed a one-year contract with Kavala.

== Honours ==
Olympiacos

- Super League Greece: 2006–07

Individual

- Beta Ethniki Player of the Season: 2004
