= 2012–13 Super League Greece =

77th season of top-tier football league in Greece

Super League Greece
- Season: 2012–13
- Dates: 25 August 2012 – 21 April 2013
- Champions: Olympiacos; 40th Greek title
- Relegated: AEK Athens; Kerkyra
- Champions League: Olympiacos; PAOK
- Europa League: Skoda Xanthi; Atromitos; Asteras Tripolis
- Matches: 240
- Goals: 512 (2.13 per match)
- Top goalscorer: Rafik Djebbour (20 goals)
- Biggest home win: Veria 5–0 Platanias
- Biggest away win: AEK Athens 0–4 Olympiacos; Veria 0–4 AEK Athens; OFI 0–4 Olympiacos; Platanias 0–4 Olympiacos
- Highest scoring: PAOK 4–2 Panionios; Aris 5–1 Asteras Tripolis
- Highest attendance: 32,018; Olympiacos 1–1 Panathinaikos
- Lowest attendance: 168; Kerkyra 1–2 Levadiakos
- Average attendance: 4,785

The 2012–13 Super League Greece was the 77th season of the highest football league of Greece and the seventh under the name Super League. The season started on 25 August 2012 and ended on 2 June 2013 with the last matches of the play-off round. Olympiacos were the defending champions, having won their 39th Greek championship in the 2011–12 season. They successfully defended their crown, finishing 15 points ahead of second-placed PAOK.

The league comprised 13 teams from the 2011–12 season and three promoted teams from the 2011–12 Football League.

== Teams ==
Three teams were relegated at the end of the 2011–12 season. Ergotelis, Panetolikos and Doxa Drama would compete to the 2012–13 Football League.

Three teams were promoted from the 2011–12 Football League. The champions, Panthrakikos, the runners-up Veria and the winners of the promotion play-offs, Platanias. Panthrakikos and Veria returned to top level respectively two and four years after relegation, while Platanias made their debut.

Promoted from 2011–12 Football League	Relegated from 2011–12 Super League Greece
Panthrakikos; Veria; Platanias	Ergotelis; Panetolikos; Doxa Drama

=== Stadiums and locations ===
Location of the 2012–13 Super League Greece teams

Club	Location	Venue	Capacity	2011–12
AEK Athens	Athens (Marousi)	Athens Olympic Stadium	69,638	5th
Aris	Thessaloniki (Charilaou)	Kleanthis Vikelidis Stadium	22,800	9th
Asteras Tripolis	Tripoli	Theodoros Kolokotronis Stadium	7,616	6th
Atromitos	Athens (Peristeri)	Peristeri Stadium	10,200	4th
Kerkyra	Corfu	Kerkyra Stadium	2,776	13rd
Levadiakos	Livadeia	Levadia Municipal Stadium	6,500	7th
OFI	Heraklion	Theodoros Vardinogiannis Stadium	9,088	10th
Olympiacos	Piraeus	Karaiskakis Stadium	32,115	1st
Panathinaikos	Athens (Marousi)	Leoforos Alexandras Stadium	16,118	2nd
Panionios	Athens (Nea Smyrni)	Nea Smyrni Stadium	11,700	12th
Panthrakikos	Komotini	Komotini Municipal Stadium	6,198	1st (FL)
PAOK	Thessaloniki (Toumba)	Toumba Stadium	28,703	3rd
PAS Giannina	Ioannina	Zosimades Stadium	7,652	8th
Platanias	Chania	Perivolia Municipal Stadium	4,000	3rd (FL)
Skoda Xanthi	Xanthi	Skoda Xanthi Arena	7,361	11th
Veria	Veria	Veria Stadium	7,000	2nd (FL)

=== Personnel and kits ===
Note: Flags indicate national team as has been defined under FIFA eligibility rules. Players and Managers may hold more than one non-FIFA nationality.

Team	Head coach	Captain	Kit manufacturer	Shirt sponsor
AEK Athens	(Greece) Traianos Dellas	(Greece) Antonis Rikka	Puma	Kino
Aris	(Greece) Soulis Papadopoulos	(Greece) Grigoris Papazaharias	Under Armour	Kino
Asteras Tripolis	(Greece) Sakis Tsiolis	(Greece) Savvas Tsabouris	Nike	Lotto
Atromitos	(Greece) Georgios Paraschos	(Greece) Giannis Skondras	hummel	Lotto
Kerkyra	(Greece) Giannis Papakostas	(Greece) Nikolaos Anastasopoulos	Lotto	Tzoker
Levadiakos	(Bosnia and Herzegovina) Jasminko Velić	(Greece) Thanasis Moulopoulos	hummel	Extra 5
OFI	(Greece) Giannis Petrakis	(Argentina) Ricardo Verón	Legea	Races
Olympiacos	(Spain) Míchel	(Greece) Avraam Papadopoulos	Puma	Pame Stoixima
Panathinaikos	(Greece) Giannis Vonortas	(Greece) Giourkas Seitaridis	adidas	OPAP
Panionios	(Greece) Konstantinos Panagopoulos	(Greece) Fanouris Goundoulakis	Tempo Sport	Tzoker
Panthrakikos	(Greece) Pavlos Dermitzakis	(Greece) Achilleas Sarakatsanos	Joma	Lotto
PAOK	(Greece) Georgios Georgiadis	(Greece) Dimitris Salpingidis	Umbro	Pame Stoixima
PAS Giannina	(Greece) Giannis Christopoulos	(Greece) Georgios Dasios	Lotto	Tzoker
Platanias	(Greece) Angelos Anastasiadis	(Greece) Markos Maragoudakis	Macron	Tzoker
Skoda Xanthi	(Greece) Marinos Ouzounidis	(Greece) Spyros Vallas	Nike	Super 3
Veria	(Greece) Dimitris Kalaitzidis	(Greece) Nikolaos Georgeas	hummel	Lotto

Adidas is the official ball supplier for Super League Greece.

=== Managerial changes ===
Team	Outgoing manager	Manner of departure	Date of vacancy	Position in table	Incoming manager	Date of appointment
PAOK	(Romania) László Bölöni	Mutual consent	25 May 2012	Pre-Season	(Greece) Georgios Donis	31 May 2012
Olympiacos	(Spain) Ernesto Valverde	End of contract	31 Μay 2012	Pre-Season	(Portugal) Leonardo Jardim	10 June 2012
Veria	(Greece) Makis Chavos	Sacked	4 September 2012	12th	(Greece) Nikos Karidas	5 September 2012
Skoda Xanthi	(Greece) Marinos Ouzounidis	Sacked	23 September 2012	6th	(Greece) Nikos Kostenoglou	30 September 2012
AEK Athens	(Greece) Vangelis Vlachos	Sacked	30 September 2012	16th	(Germany) Ewald Lienen	10 October 2012
Aris	(Greece) Makis Katsavakis	Sacked	7 October 2012	10th	(Greece) Nikos Pasialis	8 October 2012 (Caretaker)
Panthrakikos	(Greece) Savvas Pantelidis	Sacked	29 October 2012	13th	(Greece) Pavlos Dermitzakis	31 October
Panathinaikos	(Portugal) Jesualdo Ferreira	Resigned	14 November 2012	6th	(Argentina) Juan Ramón Rocha	14 November 2012
Veria	(Greece) Nikos Karidas	Sacked	18 November 2012	15th	(Greece) Dimitris Kalaitzidis	20 November 2012
Platanias	(Greece) Giannis Chatzinikolaou	Sacked	19 November 2012	9th	(Greece) Angelos Anastasiadis	20 November 2012
Skoda Xanthi	(Greece) Nikos Kostenoglou	Sacked	2 December 2012	15th	(Greece) Marinos Ouzounidis	4 December 2012
Aris	(Greece) Nikos Pasialis (caretaker)	Manager Arrival	3 December 2012	14th	(Spain) Lucas Alcaraz	3 December 2012
Atromitos	(Bosnia and Herzegovina) Dušan Bajević	Mutual consent	24 December 2012	4th	(Greece) Nikos Anastopoulos	31 December 2012
OFI	(Greece) Nikos Anastopoulos	Resigned	27 December 2012	10th	(Greece) Giannis Petrakis	2 January 2013
Panathinaikos	(Argentina) Juan Ramón Rocha	Mutual Consent	7 January 2013	9th	(Spain) Fabri González	8 January 2013
Olympiacos	(Portugal) Leonardo Jardim	Sacked	19 January 2013	1st	(Greece) Antonis Nikopolidis	19 January 2013
Aris	(Spain) Lucas Alcaraz	Sacked	29 January 2013	14th	(Greece) Giannis Michalitsos	29 January 2013
Olympiacos	(Greece) Antonis Nikopolidis (caretaker)	Manager Arrival	4 February 2013	1st	(Spain) Míchel	4 February 2013
Kerkyra	(Greece) Akis Mantzios	Sacked	6 February 2013	16th	(Greece) Giannis Papakostas	7 February 2013
Panionios	(Greece) Dimitris Eleftheropoulos	Sacked	17 February 2013	12th	(Greece) Konstantinos Panagopoulos	18 February 2013
Aris	(Greece) Giannis Michalitsios	Sacked	7 March 2013	15th	(Greece) Soulis Papadopoulos	8 March 2013
Levadiakos	(Greece) Giorgos Paraschos	Sacked	22 March 2013	9th	(Bosnia and Herzegovina) Jasminko Velić	22 March 2013
Panathinaikos	(Spain) Fabriciano González	Sacked	31 March 2013	6th	(Greece) Giannis Vonortas	1 April 2013
Atromitos	(Greece) Nikos Anastopoulos	Sacked	7 April 2013	4th	(Greece) Giorgos Paraschos	8 April 2013
AEK Athens	(Germany) Ewald Lienen	Sacked	9 April 2013	12th	(Greece) Traianos Dellas	9 April 2013
PAOK	(Greece) Georgios Donis	Sacked	29 April 2013	2nd	(Greece) Georgios Georgiadis (caretaker)	30 April 2013

== Regular season ==
=== League table ===
Pos	Team	Pld	W	D	L	GF	GA	GD	Pts	Qualification or relegation
1	Olympiacos (C)	30	24	5	1	64	16	+48	77	Qualification for the Champions League group stage
2	PAOK	30	18	8	4	46	19	+27	62	Qualification for the Play-offs
3	Asteras Tripolis	30	17	5	8	41	25	+16	56	Qualification for the Play-offs
4	Atromitos	30	11	13	6	26	22	+4	46	Qualification for the Play-offs
5	PAS Giannina	30	12	8	10	28	24	+4	44	Qualification for the Play-offs
6	Panathinaikos (Note: Panathinaikos started the league season with minus 2 points because of severe crowd violence during their home match against Olympiacos last year.)	30	10	12	8	32	30	+2	40 (Note: 6th place play-off: Panathinaikos–Skoda Xanthi 3–0.)	
7	Skoda Xanthi	30	10	10	10	28	26	+2	40	Qualification for the Europa League second qualifying round
8	Panionios	30	11	3	16	35	42	−7	36 (Note: Head-to-head points: Panionios 9, Platanias 7, Panthrakikos 1.)	
9	Platanias	30	10	6	14	29	42	−13	36	
10	Panthrakikos	30	10	6	14	30	33	−3	36	
11	Levadiakos	30	9	7	14	21	35	−14	34	
12	Veria	30	8	9	13	30	35	−5	33 (Note: Head-to-head points (goal difference): Veria 3 (+1), Aris 3 (-1).)	
13	Aris	30	7	12	11	32	40	−8	33	
14	OFI	30	8	8	14	33	46	−13	32	
15	AEK Athens (Note: AEK Athens were deducted 3 points because of severe crowd violence during their home match against Panthrakikos this year. They were also voluntarily relegated to the third division in order to enter the liquidation process and remove a big number of debts to the club.) (R)	30	8	6	16	21	36	−15	27	Relegation to Gamma Ethniki
16	Kerkyra (R)	30	4	8	18	16	41	−25	20	Relegation to Football League

Source: Super League Greece
Rules for classification: 1) Points; 2) Head-to-head points; 3) Head-to-head goal difference.
If in current league table there are tied teams after applying criteria 1 to 3, they are considered to share places and listed in Greek language alphabetic order.
If in final league table there are still tied teams after applying criteria 1 to 3, a decision match (or matches if they are more than two) are to be played but only in three cases: to determine the champion, to fill spots in the play-off or to determine the teams to be relegated. In any other case, the final standings of tied teams are determined with a public draw
(C) Champions; (R) Relegated

=== Results ===
Home \ Away	AEK	ARIS	AST	ATR	KER	LEV	OFI	OLY	PAO	PGSS	PNT	PAOK	PAS	PLA	XAN	VER
AEK Athens		1–1	0–1	1–1	1–1	0–1	2–1	0–4	0–2	1–0	0–3 (Note: The match between AEK Athens and Panthrakikos was awarded to Panthrakikos after being suspended at 87th minute (score:0-1))	0–0	2–1	1–0	1–0	2–1
Aris	1–1		5–1	1–1	1–0	4–0	0–0	2–2	1–0	2–1	0–0	2–2	1–2	0–2	0–0	2–1
Asteras Tripolis	3–1	1–1		3–0	3–0	1–0	2–1	0–1	2–2	2–1	1–0	1–0	2–0	2–1	0–1	3–0
Atromitos	1–0	0–1	0–2		2–0	0–0	3–2	0–1	1–2	1–0	2–1	1–0	0–0	1–0	1–0	0–0
Kerkyra	0–1	2–2	0–1	0–2		1–2	2–1	0–1	0–0	2–1	0–2	0–0	0–2	2–1	1–1	1–1
Levadiakos	0–0	2–1	0–0	0–0	2–0		1–1	0–1	0–1	3–0	0–3	0–1	1–1	1–0	1–4	0–0
OFI	2–1	2–0	2–0	2–2	2–0	0–2		0–4	2–2	2–1	1–1	1–1	2–1	1–3	0–0	2–0
Olympiacos	3–0	2–1	1–0	2–3	2–0	4–0	2–0		1–1	2–1	4–1	0–0	2–0	2–1	4–0	3–0
Panathinaikos	1–0	1–1	0–0	1–1	1–0	1–2	3–1	2–2		0–0	1–1	2–0	1–1	0–1	0–1	3–2
Panionios	1–0	1–0	2–1	1–0	0–1	2–1	2–1	1–2	1–2		2–0	1–2	0–1	4–0	3–3	1–1
Panthrakikos	1–0	4–0	1–0	0–1	2–1	3–0	3–1	0–1	1–0	1–2		1–4	0–3	1–1	0–2	0–1
PAOK	1–0	4–1	2–1	0–0	3–1	1–0	3–1	1–1	2–0	4–2	1–0		2–0	2–0	0–1	2–0
PAS Giannina	2–0	2–0	1–2	0–0	1–0	1–0	1–0	1–2	0–0	1–2	0–0	1–3		0–0	1–0	2–0
Platanias	2–1	2–0	0–3	0–0	1–1	2–0	1–2	0–4	2–1	2–1	2–0	1–2	1–1		3–2	0–0
Skoda Xanthi	1–0	0–0	1–1	0–0	0–0	1–0	3–0	0–2	1–2	4–0	0–0	0–3	0–1	2–0		0–2
Veria	0–4	3–1	1–2	2–2	2–0	1–2	0–0	1–2	3–0	0–1	2–0	0–0	1–0	5–0	0–0	

Source: Super League Greece
Legend: Blue = home team win; Yellow = draw; Red = away team win.

=== Positions by round ===
The table lists the positions of teams after each week of matches. In order to preserve chronological evolvements, any postponed matches are not included in the round at which they were originally scheduled, but added to the full round they were played immediately afterwards.

Team ╲ Round	1	2	3	4	5	6	7	8	9	10	11	12	13	14	15	16	17	18	19	20	21	22	23	24	25	26	27	28	29	30
Olympiacos	2	1	1	1	1	1	1	1	1	1	1	1	1	1	1	1	1	1	1	1	1	1	1	1	1	1	1	1	1	1
PAOK	5	7	4	2	2	3	2	3	2	2	2	2	2	2	2	2	2	2	3	3	2	3	3	3	3	3	3	2	2	2
Asteras Tripolis	3	2	4	2	4	5	4	4	4	4	4	3	3	3	3	3	3	3	2	2	3	2	2	2	2	2	3	3	3	3
Atromitos	1	3	3	5	6	6	6	6	5	5	5	5	5	4	4	4	4	4	4	4	4	4	4	4	4	4	4	4	5	4
PAS Giannina	8	9	10	14	9	11	8	9	11	9	7	6	7	5	5	6	6	6	6	6	5	5	5	6	6	5	5	5	4	5
Panathinaikos	6	8	9	11	12	8	9	8	7	6	6	7	6	7	8	8	8	8	7	7	8	8	6	5	5	6	6	7	7	6
Skoda Xanthi	10	6	7	8	10	12	15	15	13	15	14	13	13	12	12	10	11	11	10	9	6	7	8	7	7	7	7	6	6	7
Panthrakikos	14	13	8	12	15	10	13	14	15	14	13	10	10	9	9	9	9	9	11	12	10	9	11	11	13	14	14	12	10	8
Panionios	4	4	2	4	3	2	3	2	3	3	3	4	4	6	7	7	7	10	8	10	12	12	9	9	8	8	8	8	8	9
Platanias	9	5	6	6	5	4	5	5	6	8	9	8	9	10	11	12	12	12	13	15	13	13	10	10	10	9	9	10	12	10
Levadiakos	13	15	16	10	13	15	14	13	14	13	10	9	8	8	6	5	5	5	5	5	7	6	7	8	9	10	11	9	9	11
Veria	11	12	13	9	7	7	10	10	12	12	15	15	16	15	13	14	13	15	15	14	14	15	14	13	11	13	12	13	11	12
Aris	12	11	11	6	11	14	12	12	9	11	12	14	14	13	14	13	14	13	14	13	15	14	15	15	15	15	15	15	13	13
OFI	7	10	12	7	8	9	7	7	8	7	8	11	11	11	10	11	10	7	9	8	9	11	13	14	12	12	10	11	14	14
AEK Athens	16	16	14	15	16	16	16	16	16	16	16	16	15	16	15	15	15	14	12	11	11	10	12	12	14	11	13	14	15	15
Kerkyra	15	14	15	16	14	13	11	11	10	10	11	12	12	14	15	16	16	16	16	16	16	16	16	16	16	16	16	16	16	16

Champion and Champions League group stage
Qualification for the play-offs
Relegation to 2013–14 Football League

Source: Super League Greece

== Play-offs ==
In the play-off for Champions League, the four qualified teams play each other in a home and away round robin. However, they do not all start with 0 points. Instead, a weighting system applies to the teams' standing at the start of the play-off mini-league. The team finishing fifth in the Super League will start the play-off with 0 points. The fifth placed team's end of season tally of points is subtracted from the sum of the points that other teams have. This number is then divided by five.

Pos	Team	Pld	W	D	L	GF	GA	GD	Pts	Qualification	PAOK	ATR	AST	PAS
2	PAOK	6	3	0	3	7	7	0	13	Qualification for the Champions League third qualifying round		1–2	1–0	0–1
3	Atromitos	6	3	2	1	8	5	+3	11	Qualification for the Europa League play-off round (Note: Since Asteras Tripolis lost the 2012–13 Greek Football Cup final to a team already qualified for European competitions, Olympiacos, all of the Europa League allocations were made through play-off positions.)	2–1		0–0	2–0
4	Asteras Tripolis	6	2	1	3	6	7	−1	9	Qualification for the Europa League third qualifying round	1–2	2–1		2–1
5	PAS Giannina	6	2	1	3	6	8	−2	7		1–2	1–1	2–1	

Source: Super League Greece: Standings and Schedule
Legend: Blue = home team win; Yellow = draw; Red = away team win.
Rules for classification: 1) points; 2) head-to-head points; 3) head-to-head goal difference; 4) classification of regular season

== Season statistics ==
Updated to games played on 21 April 2013.

=== Top scorers ===
Rank	Player	Club	Goals
1	(Algeria) Rafik Djebbour	Olympiacos	20
2	(Greece) Stefanos Athanasiadis	PAOK	14
3	(Greece) Kostas Mitroglou	Olympiacos	11
3	(Greece) Dimitrios Papadopoulos	Panthrakikos	11
3	(Greece) Dimitris Salpingidis	PAOK	11
6	(Spain) David Aganzo	Aris	9
6	(Serbia) Brana Ilić	PAS Giannina	9
6	(Argentina) Emanuel Perrone	Asteras Tripolis	9
6	(Spain) Toché	Panathinaikos	9

=== Top assists ===
Rank	Player	Club	Assists
1	(Algeria) Djamel Abdoun	Olympiacos	8
1	(Greece) José Holebas	Olympiacos	8
2	(Argentina) Pablo de Blasis	Asteras Tripolis	7
2	(Argentina) Ariel Ibagaza	Olympiacos	7
2	(Greece) Andreas Lampropoulos	OFI	7
2	(Spain) Rubén Rayos	Asteras Tripolis	7
7	(France) Nicolas Marin	Skoda Xanthi	5
7	(Spain) Ximo Navarro	Asteras Tripolis	5
7	(Greece) Manolis Papasterianos	Aris	5
7	(Argentina) Mauro Poy	Levadiakos	5
7	(Greece) Dimitris Salpingidis	PAOK	5

== Awards ==
=== MVP and Best Goal Awards ===
Matchday	MVP	Best Goal	Ref
1st	(Brazil) Chumbinho (Atromitos)	(Greece) Stefanos Athanasiadis (PAOK)	
2nd	(Spain) Ruben Rayos (Asteras Tripolis)	(Argentina) Tomás De Vincenti (PAS Giannina)	
3rd	(Spain) Jonathan López (Veria)	(Republic of Ireland) Liam Lawrence (PAOK)	
4th	(Slovenia) Mirnes Šišić (OFI)	(Bulgaria) Chigozie Udoji (Platanias)	
5th	(Republic of Ireland) Liam Lawrence (PAOK)	(Greece) Stefanos Athanasiadis (PAOK)	
6th	(Serbia) Željko Kalajdžić (Platanias)	(Greece) Kenan Bargan (Veria)	
7th	(Greece) Giannis Gianniotas (Aris)	(Slovenia) Mirnes Šišić (OFI)	
8th	(Greece) Christos Aravidis (Panionios)	(Greece) Manolis Papasterianos (Aris)	
9th	(Greece) Stefanos Athanasiadis (PAOK)	(Spain) Fernando Usero (Asteras Tripolis)	
10th	(Greece) Dimitris Salpingidis (PAOK)	(Brazil) Dennis Souza (OFI)	
11th	(Serbia) Brana Ilić (PAS Giannina)	(Greece) Taxiarchis Fountas (AEK Athens)	
12th	(Morocco) Karim Fegrouche (PAS Giannina)	(Argentina) Tomás De Vincenti (PAS Giannina)	
13th	(Greece) Panagiotis Glykos (PAOK)	(Greece) Alexandros Perogamvrakis (OFI)	
14th	(Greece) Charalampos Mavrias (Panathinaikos)	(Brazil) Lino (PAOK)	
15th	(Greece) Ilias Ioannou (Veria)	(Greece) Vasilios Koutsianikoulis (OFI)	
16th	(Greece) Stelios Vasiliou (Levadiakos)	(Romania) Costin Lazăr (PAOK)	
17th	(Greece) Andreas Lampropoulos (OFI)	(Greece) Antonis Petropoulos (AEK Athens)	
18th	(Greece) Vasilios Koutsianikoulis (OFI)	(Greece) Andreas Lampropoulos (OFI)	
19th	(Serbia) Brana Ilić (PAS Giannina)	(Greece) Andreas Samaris (Panionios)	
20th	(Greece) Elini Dimoutsos (Atromitos)	(Guinea) Abdoul Camara (PAOK)	
21st	(Republic of Ireland) Liam Lawrence (PAOK)	(Ivory Coast) Serge Dié (Skoda Xanthi)	
22nd	(Greece) Andreas Tatos (Aris)	(Spain) Ruben Rayos (Asteras Tripolis)	
23rd	(Nigeria) Michael Olaitan (Veria)	(Greece) Dimitris Salpingidis (PAOK)	
24th	(Greece) Nikos Kaltsas (Veria)	(Greece) Kostas Katsouranis (PAOK)	
25th	(Croatia) Gordon Schildenfeld (PAOK)	(Greece) Giannis Gianniotas (Aris)	
26th	(Guinea) Abdoul Camara (PAOK)	(Ivory Coast) Serge Dié (Skoda Xanthi)	
27th	(Greece) Vasilios Koutsianikoulis (OFI)	(Greece) Thanasis Papazoglou (OFI)	
28th	(Greece) Andreas Tatos (Aris)	(Brazil) Rogério Martins (Levadiakos)	
29th	(Greece) Andreas Tatos (Aris)	(Greece) Andreas Tatos (Aris)	
30th	(Greece) Kostas Katsouranis (PAOK)	(Greece) Dimitrios Papadopoulos (Panthrakikos)	

=== Annual awards ===
Annual awards were announced on 3 February 2014

Award	Winner	Club
Greek Player of the Season	(Greece) Dimitrios Papadopoulos	Panthrakikos
Foreign Player of the Season	(Spain) Ruben Rayos	Asteras Tripolis
Young Player of the Season	(Albania) Ergys Kaçe	PAOK
Goalkeeper of the Season	(Greece) Orestis Karnezis	Panathinaikos
Golden Boot	(Algeria) Rafik Djebbour	Olympiacos
Manager of the Season	(Greece) Giannis Christopoulos	PAS Giannina

== Attendances ==
Olympiacos drew the highest average home attendance in the 2012–13 edition of the Super League Greece.

#	Team	Average attendance
1	Olympiacos	20,918
2	PAOK	11,328
3	AEK Athens	10,602
4	Aris	8,121
5	Panathinaikos	8,045
6	Platanias	2,446
7	OFI	2,201
8	PAS Giannina	2,154
9	Asteras Tripolis	2,075
10	Panionios	2,037
11	Veria	2,017
12	Atromitos	1,814
13	Panthrakikos	1,565
14	Skoda Xanthi	1,444
15	Levadiakos	1,103
16	Kerkyra	523
