= Giannis Vonortas =

Greek footballer and manager

Personal information
- Full name: Ioannis Vonortas
- Date of birth: 25 June 1960 (age 66)
- Place of birth: Wrocław, Poland
- Height: 1.85 m (6 ft 1 in)

Team information
- Current team: Defender

Senior career*
Years	Team	Apps	(Gls)
1981–1982	Panathinaikos B	3	(0)
1982–1983	→ Egaleo (loan)	36	(1)
1983–1987	Panathinaikos	37	(2)
1987–1989	Levadiakos	45	(1)
1989–1992	Panargiakos		

Managerial career
- 2005–2012: Panathinaikos U20 (assistant)
- 2012–2013: Panathinaikos (assistant)
- 2013: Panathinaikos (caretaker)
- 2013–2015: Panathinaikos (assistant)
- 2015–2017: Panathinaikos (assistant)
- 2021–2022: Panathinaikos B
- * Club domestic league appearances and goals

Giannis Vonortas (Greek: Γιάννης Βονόρτας, born 25 June 1960) is a Greek professional football manager and former player.

== Playing career ==
Vonortas played at Panathinaikos, Egaleo, Levadiakos, and Panargiakos.

== Coaching career ==
Vonortas became assistant manager of Panathinaikos F.C. in 2005. When Fabri was sacked as manager of Panathinaikos on 31 March 2013, Vonortas was installed as caretaker manager until the end of the season
