= Nea Smyrni Stadium =

Stadium in Nea Smyrni, Greece

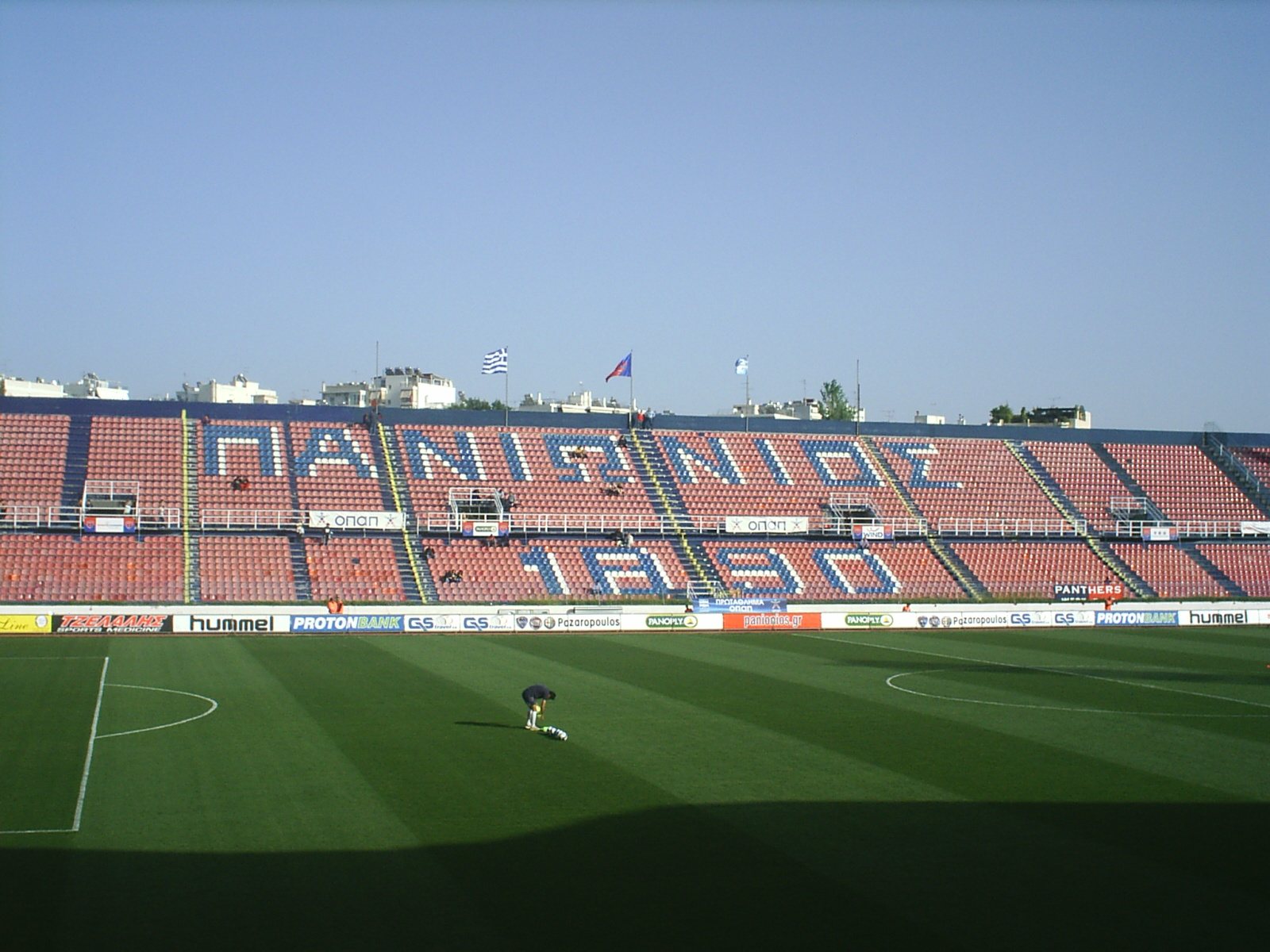
- Interactive map of Nea Smyrni Stadium
- Location: Nea Smyrni, Athens, Greece
- Coordinates: 37°56′35″N 23°42′33″E
- Owner: Panionios G.S.S.
- Operator: Panionios G.S.S.
- Capacity: 11,700
- Scoreboard: Yes
- Public transit: Megalou Alexandrou Agia Paraskevi

Construction
- Opened: 1939
- Renovated: 2001, 2003, 2016

Tenants
- Panionios G.S.S., Panionios F.C. Youth

Nea Smyrni Stadium (Greek: Στάδιο Νέας Σμύρνης) is a multi-purpose stadium in Nea Smyrni, Greece. It is currently used mostly for football matches and is the home stadium of Panionios, which plays in Super League 2. The all seated stadium holds 11,700 spectators and was built in 1939. Before full seating was installed in 1998 for the participation of Panionios in the UEFA Cup Winners' Cup its capacity was close to 19,000. The stadium is eligible to host UEFA Europa League matches and its football pitch dimensions are about average at 105x72m.

== Early history ==
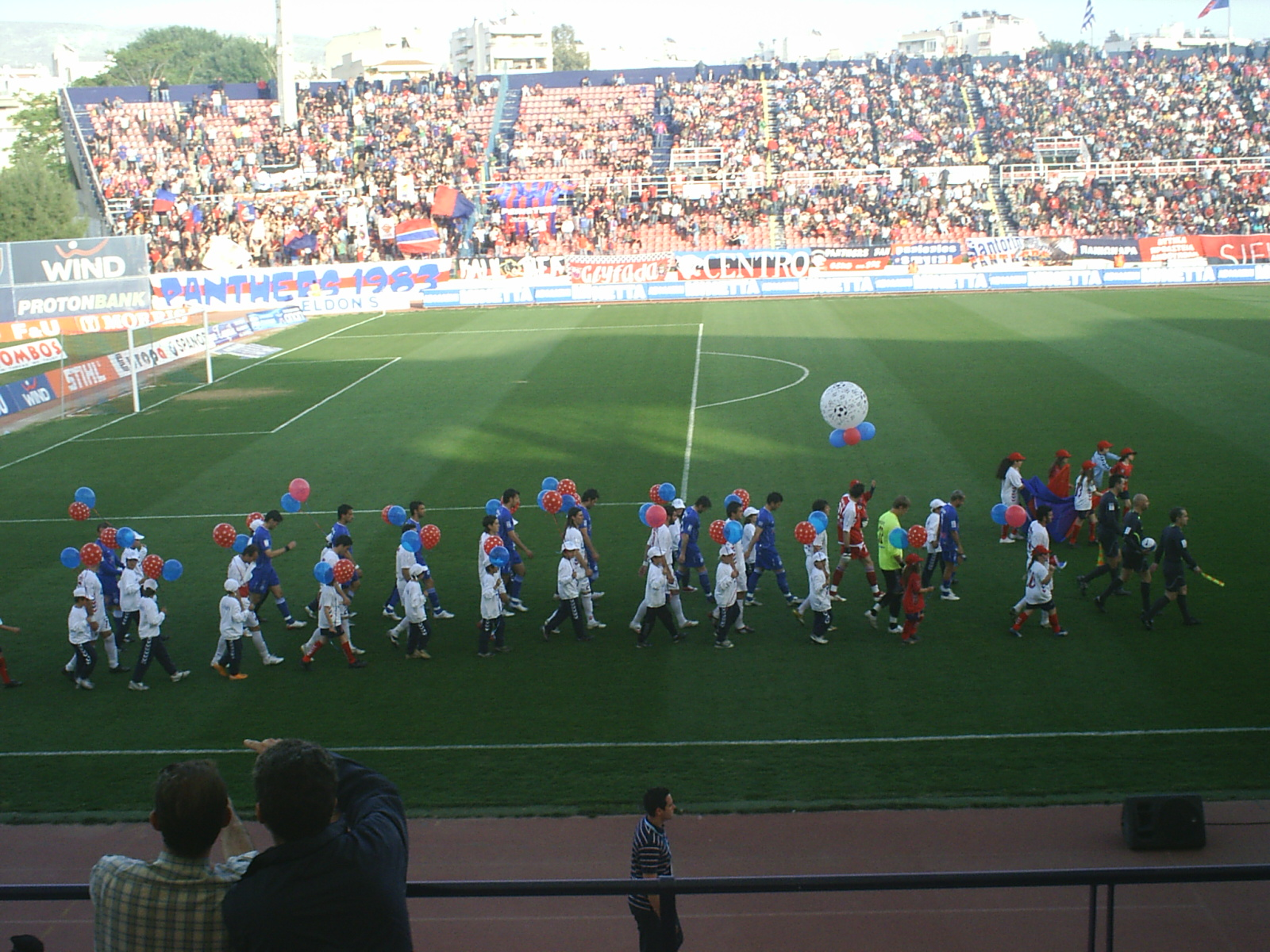
Panionios playing a home game in Nea Smyrni Stadium

In November 1937, Panionios G.S.S. Board of Directors led by President D. Karabatis and the Municipality of Nea Smyrni agreed to relocate the club in Nea Smyrni, a suburb of the Athens urban area that was mainly inhabited by Greek World War I refugees coming from Smyrna, the club's historical home. Construction works started in 1938, and were completed one year later.

In the summer of 1940 the first football matches take place, with the club donating the money to support the repair of Greek Warship "Elli" which was hit by Italian forces on World War II. On September later that year Panionios G.S.S. celebrated its 50th year together with the completion of building the new stadium. Since then it has been used constantly for over 70 years from Panionios G.S.S. associated clubs and sports divisions.

== Recent history ==
Improvement works have been undertaken in 2001 and 2003 including a cafeteria, Panionios G.S.S. sports shop, press and office facilities, improved medical and player facilities etc. Additionally a roof was placed above the East wing of the stadium. In 2009 Panionios G.S.S. installed an electronic ticketing system on the stadium to improve security in the team's matches.

Despite the improvements the core fan base of the team as well as its management strongly support that the old stadium is inadequate to cover the team's needs in terms of quality of services provided to the fans. Additionally, there are safety concerns as the stadium does not have enough entry and exit points in case of emergency.

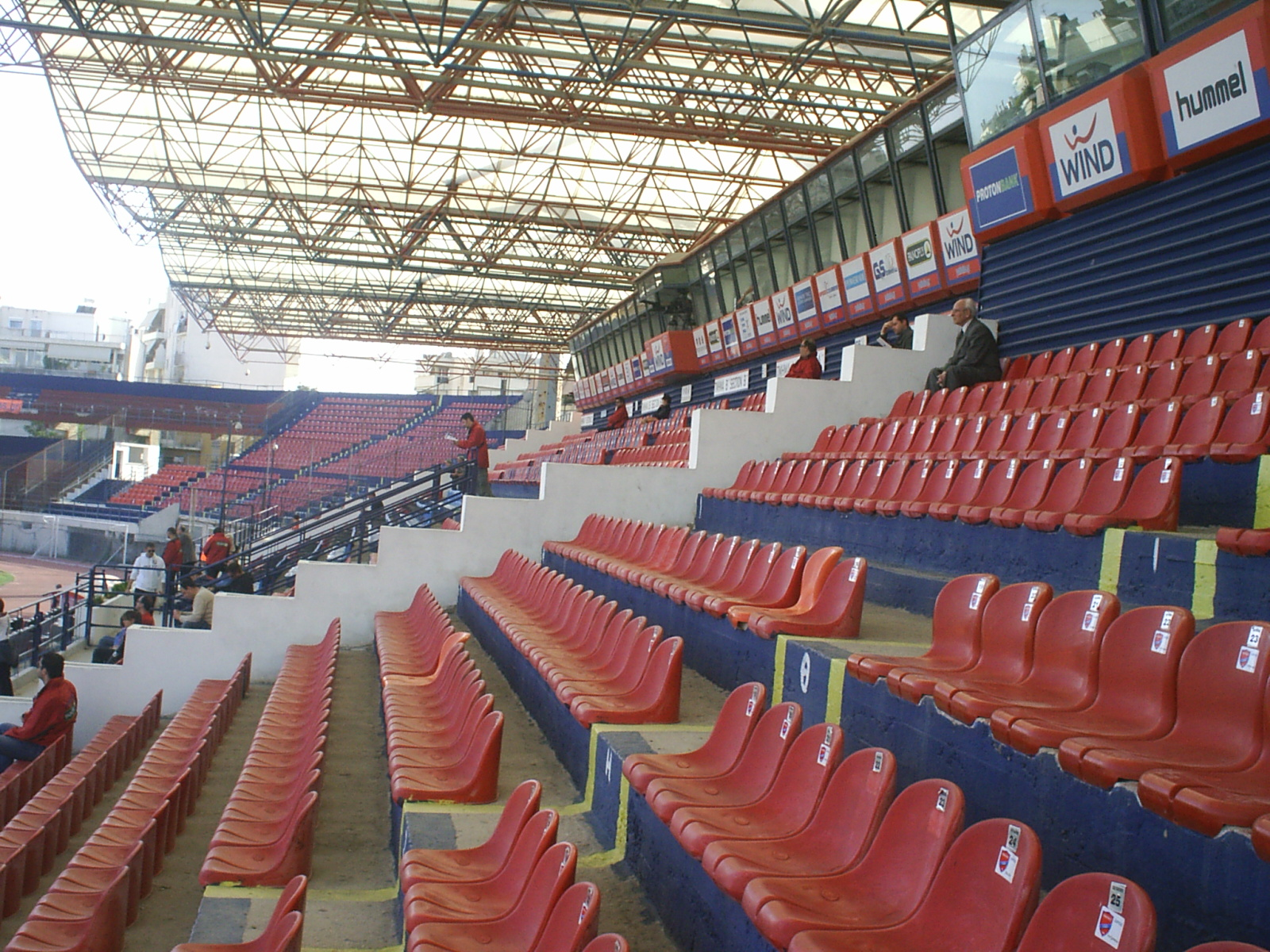
View from the stadium's East Wing

The highest attendance ever recorded was on 1974 against Panathinaikos with 20,950 spectators. After the installation of seats and the reduction of the stadium's capacity there have been numerous matches with full attendance mainly in European competitions. The most recent ticket 'sold-out' was against Panathinaikos in 2008.

Apart from Panionios G.S.S. and its associated youth teams, the stadium was used for decades from Panionios G.S.S. athletes on track & field and numerous times from Greece U21 and U23. Additionally, due to the closing of many stadiums for renovation for the 2004 Athens Olympic Games, Nea Smyrni stadium was partly used from other football clubs as well. Those included AEK Athens for the first half of the 2003/2004 football season and Olympiacos F.C. for one match in February 2003 against OFI. Last it has been the venue site for the 2004 Greek Cup final played by Panathinaikos and Olympiacos.

Due to its densely populated location, Nea Smyrni stadium has rarely been used as a concert site. The most famous concert ever taken place was Metallica's first appearance in Greece on June 27, 1993.

== New stadium ==
Panionios G.S.S. President Constantinos Tsakiris has announced the willingness of the club to replace the old stadium with a brand new 29.000 m^{2} athletic centre cost of which will be approximately 60 million euro. The new athletic centre will include a modern football stadium of 12,000 seats, a basketball and a volleyball arena, an aquatic complex (including a water polo pool of 33m., 1 swimming pool of 25m., pools for children learning), a track and field training center as well as facilities for boxing, rhythmic gymnastics, wrestling, etc. Additionally, it will include a building complex of 6.500 m^{2} for complementary amenities of the football stadium like vestry, administration offices, restaurants, VIP accommodations, and press facilities. The extra facilities other than the football stadium will be used by Panionios G.S.S., the multi-sport club under which Panionios G.S.S. belongs.

The new stadium project has triggered a minor controversy as small number of petitioners alongside side with members of the council of the Municipality of Nea Smyrni are objecting in its construction and are threatening to take legal action unless a new formula will be agreed between all parties regarding certain aspects of the project. The main argument of the opposition group is that the new athletic center will have increased commercial spaces (measured in square meters) in comparison to the existing one, thus increasing traffic and congestion in the area. The club responds that this extra space for commercial use in the project's architectural plans mainly consist of parking spaces and administration offices for Panionios G.S.S. and Panionios G.S.S. which is a common land use for the area and not department stores as the opposition believes. Additionally, the club legally argues that according to the current urban planning status of the existing stadium there is space for extra commercial uses that are not in operation/lease (have been in the past but failed to stay open).

The debate has temporarily paused, with the club pointing that without the commercial spaces in place the new project cannot generate enough income to repay its construction cost and has promised to come back with an alternative proposal that will satisfy all parties. Moreover, the Municipality of Nea Smyrni which has collectively taken a positive stance towards the new athletic center is expected to facilitate the debate and assist its resolution.

== See also ==
- List of association football stadiums by country

Preceded by Toumba Stadium; Thessaloniki	Greek Football Cup; Final Venue; 2004	Succeeded by Pampeloponnisiako; Patras
