= Stathis Chaitas =

Greek footballer (born 1940)

Personal information
- Full name: Efstathios Chaitas
- Date of birth: 20 March 1940 (age 86)
- Place of birth: Istiaia, Euboea, Greece
- Position: Midfielder

Youth career
- 1959–1960: Panionios

Senior career*
| Years | Team | Apps | (Gls) |
| 1960–1974 | Panionios | 418 | (67) |
| 1974–1975 | AEL | 20 | (1) |
| 1975–1977 | Panionios | 42 | (2) |
| Total | | 480 | (70) |

International career^{‡}
| 1964–1971 | Greece | 24 | (1) |

Managerial career
- 1983: Panionios
- 1984: Panionios
- 1996: Panionios
- * Club domestic league appearances and goals ‡ National team caps and goals as of 12 December 2015

Stathis Chaitas (Greek: Στάθης Xάιτας; born 20 March 1940) is a retired Greek footballer who played as a midfielder during the 1960s and '70s. He was named the 1969 Greek Athlete of the Year.

== Career ==
=== Club career ===
Born in Istiaia, Euboea, Chaitas played football for Panionios from 1958 until 1977 with a brief interlude in 1974–1975 season when he played for AEL. He still holds the record of most appearances in the 1st National for Panionios with 460 caps.

=== International career ===
Chaitas appeared in 24 matches for the senior Greece national football team from 1964 to 1971, scoring one goal.

=== Career as manager ===
After his playing days were over, he coached a number of clubs including Panionios, late in 1996.
