= Panionios G.S.S. =

Greek multi-sport club

- Full name: Panionios Gymnastikos Syllogos Smyrnis; Πανιώνιος Γυμναστικός Σύλλογος Σμύρνης
- Nickname: Kyanerythroi (Blue-Reds); Istorikos (Historic); Panthers
- Founded: 1890 as Orpheus Smyrni
- Colours: Red, Blue
- Chairman: Thodoris Ntantos
- Titles: Balkan Titles: 1 Domestic Titles: 34
- Website: www.panionios.gr

Panionios G.S.S. (Greek: Πανιώνιος Γυμναστικός Σύλλογος Σμύρνης, Panionios Gymnastikos Syllogos Smyrnis), the Pan-Ionian Gymnastics Club of Smyrna, is a Greek multi-sport club founded in 1890. Originally based in Smyrna/İzmir, the club was uprooted in the population exchange between Greece and Turkey following the Asia Minor Catastrophe in 1922. It is now based in the suburban town of Nea Smyrni, located in the Attica, and where many of the refugees from Smyrna settled.

The Panionios football team has won the Greek Cup twice (1979, 1998) while the Panionios basketball team won the Greek Cup in 1991.

Panionios has a long tradition of raising talented athletes in many sports (e.g. Fanis Christodoulou, Thomas Mavros, Nikos Anastopoulos, Dimitris Saravakos, etc.)

== History ==
=== Smyrna era (1890–1922) ===
Panionios was founded in 1890 under the name Orpheus, by Greeks of Smyrna in the Ottoman Empire. The name related with the legendary musician of ancient Greece, because the main activity of the club was the music. Three years later, in 1893, members of Orpheus who wished the activities of Orpheus to be focused on sport withdrew from the club and founded a new club. That was named Gymnasium and it was the first exclusively Greek sport club in Smyrna. In 1896, Gymnasium organized the first Panionian Games and in 1897 participated in the foundation of SEGAS along with 25 clubs from Greece and two from Cyprus.

In October 1898, Orpheus and Gymnasion merged again to form Panionios GSS. The next years Panionios took part in all Panhellenic Games. It also took over the organisation of Panionian Games. Between 1898 and 1922, the games were held 19 times. These games together Panhellenic Games were the most important Greek athletic events. In 1900, Panionios organised the first poetry competition. The winner was Stelios Sperantzas with the poem anthem of Panionios. The first years, Panionios hadn't got its own gymnasium. The club rented out a court near the wharf, from the French company of Smyrna. In 1910 the French company sold the area and Panionios stayed homeless. Thanks to Chrysostomos of Smyrna, Panionios was allotted a big area for its gymnasium near the Greek cemetery. The inauguration of new stadium was held in 1911 during 14th Panionian Games.

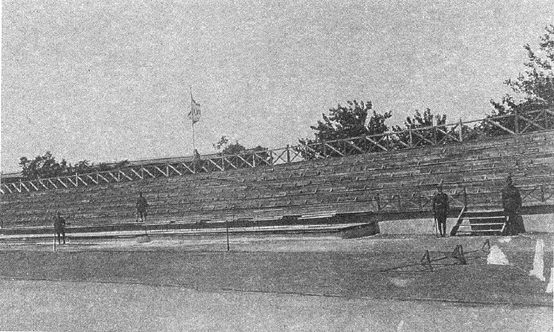
Stadium of Panionios Gymnastic Club in Smyrna in 1920, during the Panionian Games

=== Athens era (1922–1938) ===
The presence of Panionios in Smyrna finished with the Asia Minor Catastrophe. After the Asia Minor Catastrophe and the expulsion of Greek of Asia Minor, Panionios threatened to be dissolved. The club rescued thanks to its president, Dimitrios Dallas. He tracked down the survivors athletes of Panionios and regrouped the club. The first years Panionios hadn't got own sport facilities. The offices of the club were temporarily accommodated in a small room in Panathenaic Stadium in Athens. In 1923 Panionios reestablished the Panionian Games in Athens with the participation 10 athletic clubs. Panionian games were repeated in 1925, during 35th anniversary of Panionios. In November 1937, Panionios Board of Directors led by President D. Karabatis and the Municipality of Nea Smyrni agreed to relocate the club in Nea Smyrni, the Athens suburb that was mainly inhabited by Greek Asia Minor refugees coming from Smyrna, the club's historical home. Construction works started in 1938, and were completed one year later, 1939.

=== New Smyrna (Nea Smyrni) era (1938–today) ===
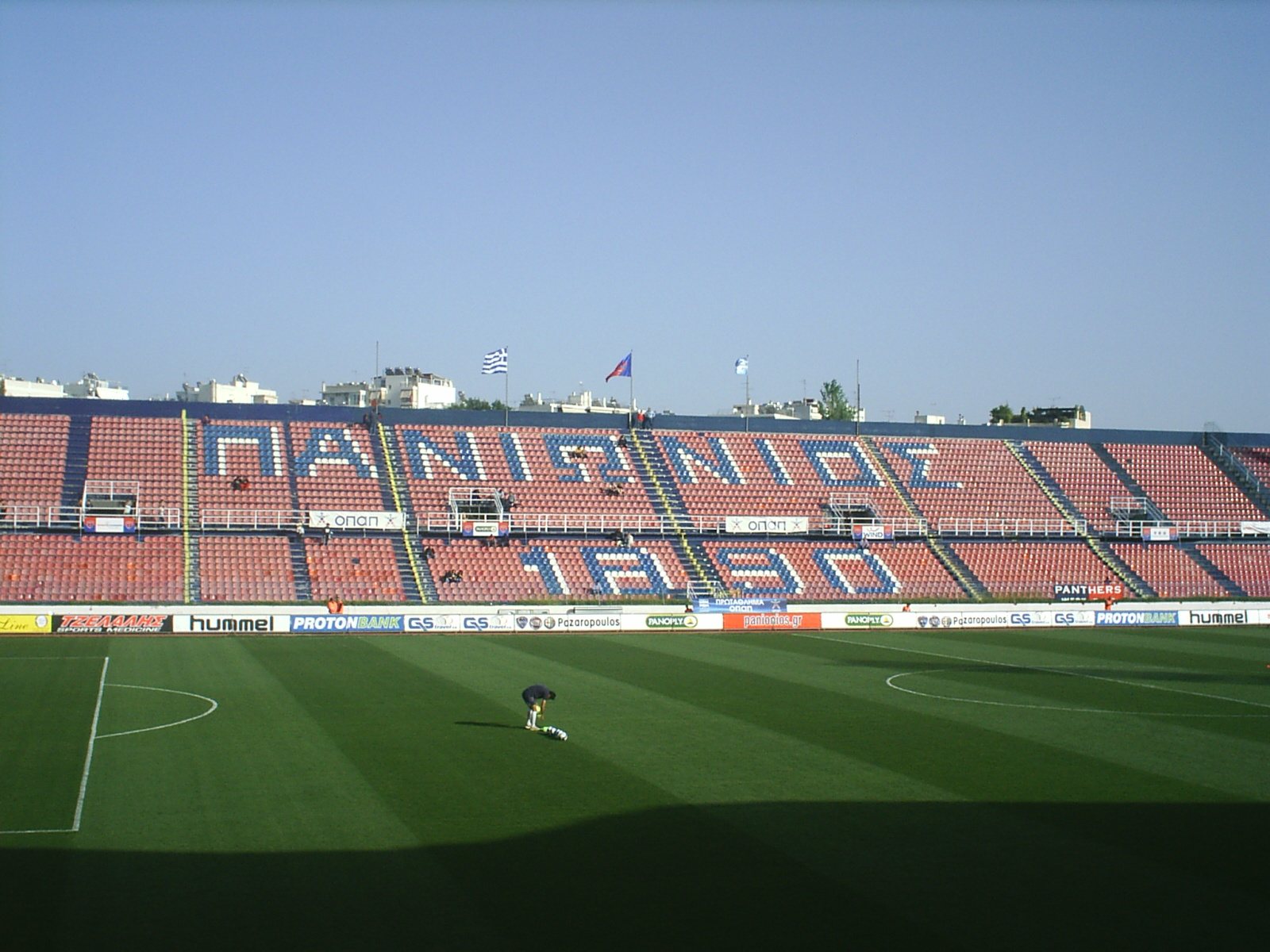
Nea Smyrni Stadium

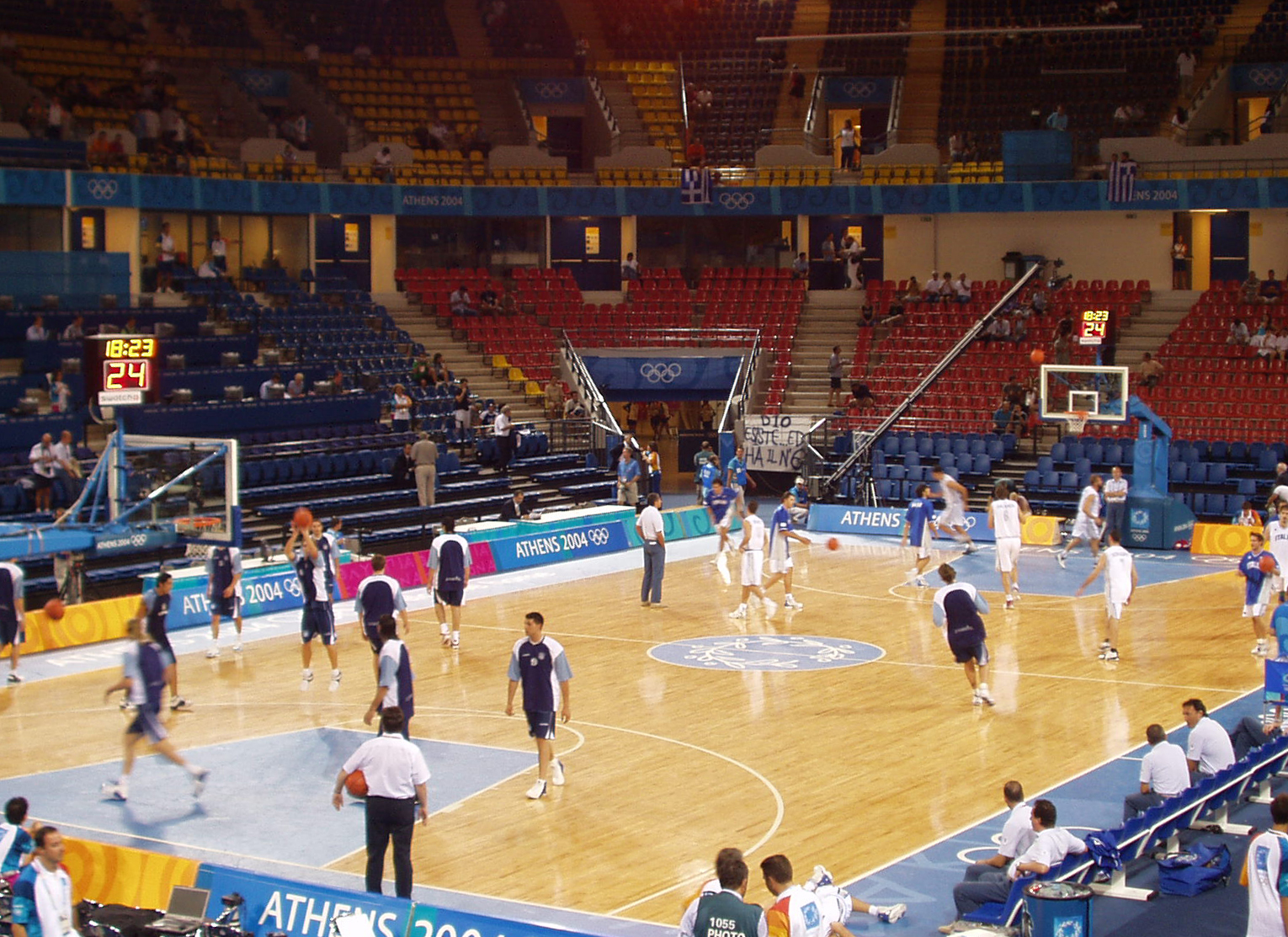
Hellinikon Olympic Arena

After the construction of stadium, Panionios regrouped the football team. Panionios football team won the championship of EPS Athens in 1951 and it was the runner-up of Panhellenic Championship the same year. The next year it was the runner up of the Football Cup where defeated by Olympiacos in the replay game (the first match had finished 2-2). Panionios football team evolved to one of the protagonists of Greek championship with steady presence in first division. It was runner-up of the championship one more time, in 1971 and also it has won two football cups in 1979 and 1998. Furthermore, Panionios has important presence in basketball and the last years in water polo. Panionios Basketball team has won a Greek cup in 1989 and one time was a runner-up of the championship (1987). The team has a steady presence in the first division finishing many times in the top four of the championship. The Panionios basketball women team has won a championship in 2007. The last years, Panionios has a successful team in water polo. So far, it has played two times in the final of LEN Trophy and five times in the final of Greek cup. The most successful department of Panionios is the Track and Field team. The women Track and Field team has won 21 Panhellenic championships so far.

== Departments ==
Current

- Panionios F.C.
- Panionios B.C.
- Panionios W.P.C.
- Panionios V.C.
- Panionios H.C.
- Panionios Gymnastics
- Panionios Swimming
- Panionios Chess
- Panionios Track and field
- Panionios Judo

Older Departments not currently operating

- Cycling
- Rowing
- Weightlifting

== Titles and honours ==
Panionios F.C.

- Greek Cup
  - Winners (2): 1979, 1998
- Balkans Cup
  - Winners (1): 1971

Panionios B.C.

- Greek Cup:
  - Winners (1): 1991
- Greek basketball women's Championship
  - Winners (1): 2007

Panionios Water Polo

- European LEN Trophy
  - finalist: (2) 2009, 2011

Panionios Athletics

- 21 Greek women's track and field championships: 1953, 1954, 1955, 1956, 1957, 1958, 1959, 1960, 1961, 1962, 1963, 1964, 1965, 1966, 1967, 1969, 1970, 1971, 1972, 1973, 1974
- 1 Greek indoor championships, Men: 1987
- 2 Greek indoor championships, Women: 1995, 1996
- 1 Cross Country Championship, Men: 1923
- 2 Cross Country Championship, Women: 1966, 1997

Panionios Cycling

- 1 Greek Championship, Overall Standings: 1949
- 1 Greek Road Championship, Men: 1951
- 1 Greek Track Championship, Men: 1947

== Notable supporters ==
- Steve Aston, Greek-Canadian MP
- Dora Bakoyannis, Member of the Hellenic Parliament
- Tina Birbili, politician with PASOK
- Fanis Christodoulou, basketball player, Panionios team manager
- Liza Doukakarou, journalist
- Giorgos Dedes, footballer, former Panionios player
- Giorgos Gerolymatos, singer
- Joyce Eveidi, actress
- Demetrios S.Giannaros, Greek-American, vice-president of Connecticut parliament
- Alexi Giannoulias, Greek-American, Treasurer of Illinois
- Louka Katseli, politician
- Isidoros Kouvelos, Greek businessman, Minister, Dora Bakoyanni's husband
- Leonidas Koutsopoulos, celebrity, Panionios former youth footballer
- Giorgos Kaminis, fmr. Mayor of Athens
- Petros Linardos, journalist
- Giorgos Kalofolias, director, actor
- Alexander Onassis, Greek businessman
- Lefteris Pantazis, singer, former Panionios FC owner
- Giannis Pantazopoulos, Greek-Australian MP
- Leonidas Raptakis, Greek-American politician, US Congress
- Panos Samaras, sports journalist
- Thanasis Saravakos, footballer, former Panionios player
