= Panionios F.C. =

Association football club in Greece

Panionios
- Full name: Πανιώνιος Γυμναστικός Σύλλογος Σμύρνης; Paniónios Gymnastikós Sýllogos Smýrnis (Pan-Ionian Gymnastic Club of Smyrna)
- Nicknames: Κυανέρυθροι (Blue and red); Ιστορικός (Historic); Πάνθηρες (Panthers)
- Founded: 14 September 1890; 136 years ago (as Orpheus Smyrni)
- Ground: Nea Smyrni Stadium
- Capacity: 11,700
- Owner: Kostas Rouptsos
- Chairman: Kostas Rouptsos
- Manager: Dimitris Koropoulis
- League: Super League Greece 2
- 2025–26: Super League Greece 2 (South Group), 2nd
- Website: panioniosfc.gr
| Home colours | Away colours | Third colours |

Panionios G.S.S. Football Club (Greek: ΠΑΕ Πανιώνιος Γ.Σ.Σ.), the Pan-Ionian Gymnastics Club of Smyrna (Πανιώνιος Γυμναστικός Σύλλογος Σμύρνης, Panionios Gymnastikos Syllogos Smyrnis), more commonly known as Panionios F.C. or simply Panionios, are a Greek football club based in Nea Smyrni, a suburban town in the Athens agglomeration, Greece. Part of Panionios G.S.S. (founded in 1890 in Smyrna), Panionios F.C. is the oldest football club in Greece.

In the wake of the Greco-Turkish War (1919–22) and the population exchange between Greece and Turkey, the multi-sport club Panionios G.S.S. was transferred to Athens. They have won two Greek Cups (in 1979 and 1998), while they were runners-up in the Greek Championship during the 1950–51 and 1970–71 seasons. They have won also the 1971 Balkans Cup and reached the quarter-finals of the UEFA Cup Winners' Cup in 1998–99 season.

The team currently competes in the second division of Greek football known as Super League Greece 2. They play their home games in Nea Smyrni Stadium with a capacity of 11,700 seats.

== History ==
=== Early years ===
Panionios' squad in 1950–51 season

The club was founded in 1890 by a part of the sizeable Greek population of İzmir (Greek: Σμύρνη), under the name of "Orpheus Music and Sports Club". In 1893, some Orpheus members keen on sports formed a separate organization, the "Gymnasion Club", and started holding yearly sports competitions. In 1898, Orpheus and Gymnasion merged again to form Panionios GSS. Members of Panionios represented Greece in all international track and field games until these developed in the modern Olympic Games.

After the Greek military defeat in 1922 the club was forced to transfer, firstly to Athens and later, to the Athenian suburb of New Smyrna, where much of the population of Smyrna re-settled. The club always had a strong tradition of cultivating all major sports; it was the first Greek club to establish a track and field division for women, in 1925. Another major example of the club's contribution to Greek sports rests in the fact that it was Panionios that introduced Basketball and Volleyball in Greek sports society.

With the gradual transformation of men's football and basketball into professional sports, Panionios FC and Panionios BC became privately owned clubs operating under the auspices of the traditional "amateur sports" Panionios GSS. To date, Panionios remains the only sports club in Greece that was awarded the Golden Cross from the Athens Academy as a recognition of the club's rich and continuous enrichment of Greek sports. In 1950, with Kostas Negrepontis as their manager and with players such as Nikos Pentzaropoulos, Kostas Nestoridis and Thanasis Saravakos, Panionios won the Athens FCA league and qualified for the Panhellenic Championship, where they finished second behind Olympiacos.

=== Recent years ===
Panionios have spent nearly its entire history in the Greek First Division (now called 'Super League'), having missed out from competing in Greek football's top division only twice in their more than 100-year history. Within this, Panionios rose quite often to high levels, with top league achievement of 2nd place in 1971, losing the title to AEK Athens. On 9 June 1979, Panionios won their first Greek Cup after winning the domestic champions, AEK Athens 3–1.

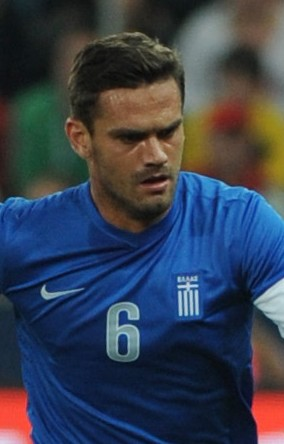
Alexandros Tziolis

Panionios produced all three major Greek strikers of the 1980s, namely Nikos Anastopoulos (later of Olympiacos), Thomas Mavros (later of AEK Athens), and Dimitris Saravakos (later of Panathinaikos). Other notable players coming out of the club in the 1990s included Nikos Tsiantakis (later of Olympiacos) and Takis Fyssas, later of Panathinaikos, Benfica and member of Greece national football team. Within the 2000s another five Greece national football team players came out from the club, namely Alexandros Tziolis, Evangelos Mantzios, Nikos Spiropoulos, Grigoris Makos and Giannis Maniatis.

The club faced financial difficulties which triggered the transfer of the ownership to the municipality of Nea Smyrni in 1992. Those difficulties remained throughout the 1990s, forcing the team's league performance to drop. Yet, it remained in a high level and won the Greek Football Cup competition in 1998 and participated successfully in the UEFA Cup Winners Cup the year after, reaching the quarter-finals. In December 2001 large parts of the club's shares moved away from the Municipality back to private hands, where working around bankruptcy legislation the club was renamed to Neos Panionios FC, to avoid the threat of relegation from the first division.

=== Constantinos Tsakiris period ===
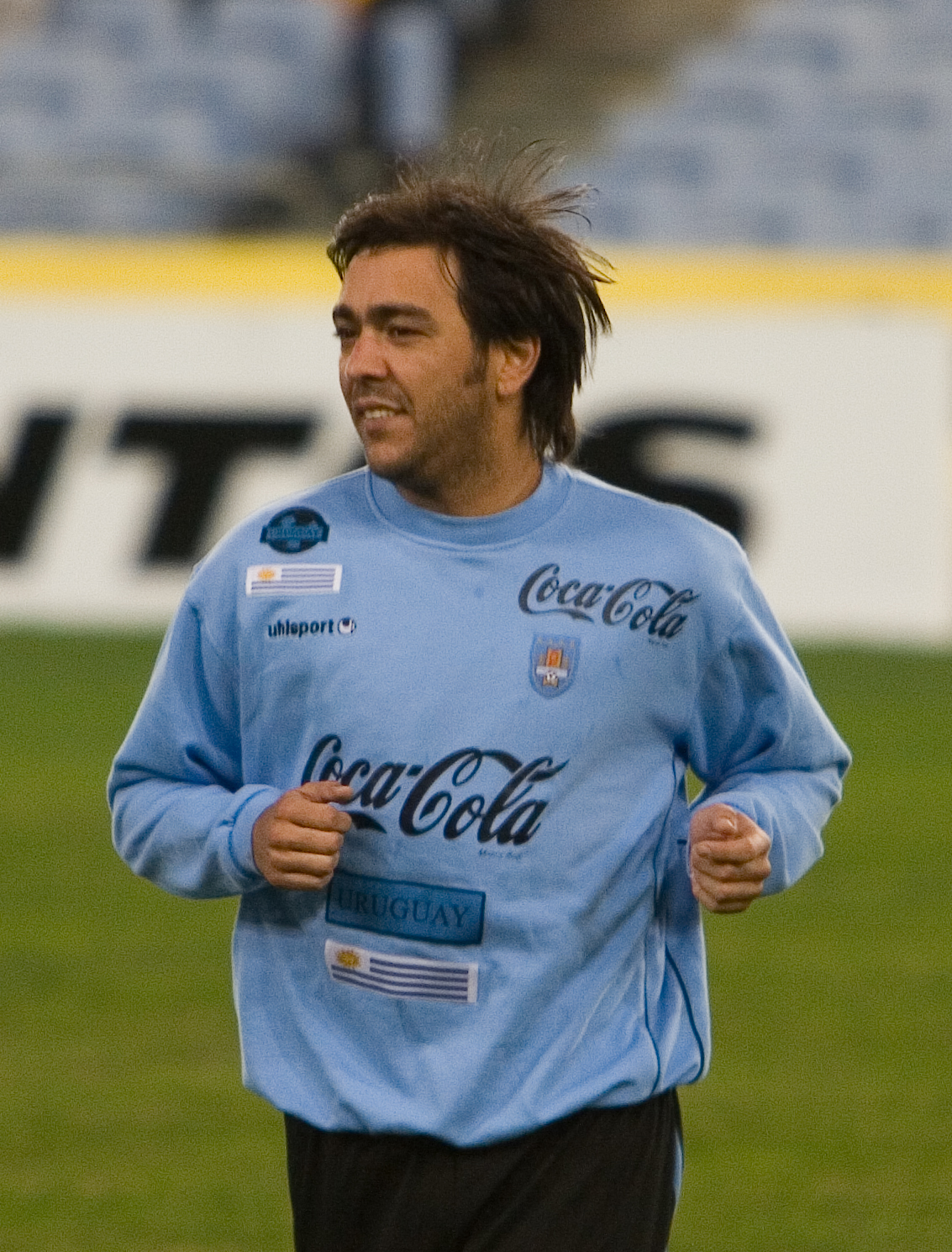
Álvaro Recoba

In 2004, shipowner Constantinos Tsakiris was elected president of the "amateur sports" Panionios GSS. Panionios won the women's Basketball Championship in 2006, the club's first in a team sport, and the women's volleyball team advanced to the first division. In 2006, Tsakiris acquired 85% of Neos Panionios FC stock and started restructuring the team from scratch. He changed the name of the club back to the original Panionios GSS FC and hired German coach Ewald Lienen who, during his first year created a team that made it to the top 5 of the Alpha Ethniki and on to the UEFA Cup. Tsakiris has also unveiled an ambitious plan to have the aging football ground and athletics track demolished, and build a modern multi-sport arena in its place. Apart from a 12,000 capacity football stadium, the proposed complex would include facilities for basketball, volleyball, aquatic sports, track & field, boxing, gymnastics, wrestling and more.

On the summer transfer window of 2008, the club signed Uruguay national team members Álvaro Recoba and Fabián Estoyanoff, but shortly after Lienen resigned by mutual consent on 11 November 2008, reason being disagreement with the Panionios' board. On 12 November 2008 Greek coach Takis Lemonis was hired and resigned on 3 December 2008 after the refuse of Panionios' board to accept Lemonis' request to dismiss three members of Panionio's coaching and management staff. Assistant coach Joti Stamatopoulos lead the club until the end of the season. He was replaced by Belgian manager Emilio Ferrera.

Under the Tsakiris presidency, the club built its own training facility just outside Athens in the region of Koropi. The training ground is operating since 2008 but was fully completed in 2009.

== Stadium ==
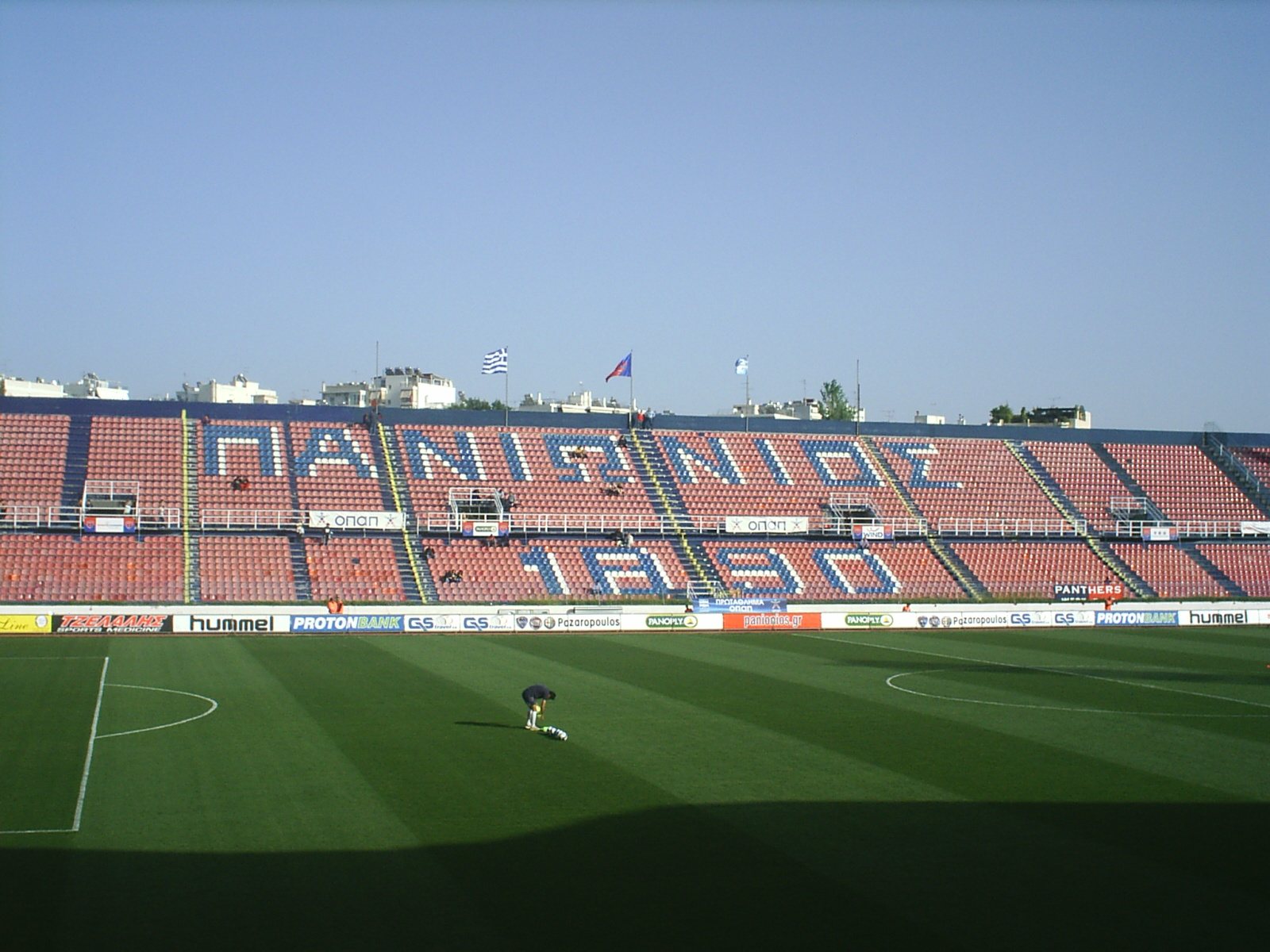
Nea Smyrni Stadium, West Stand

In November 1937, Panionios G.S.S. Board of Directors led by President D. Karabatis and the Municipality of Nea Smyrni agreed to relocate the club in Nea Smyrni, the Athens suburb that was mainly inhabited by Greek World War I refugees coming from İzmir, the club's historical home. Construction works started in 1938, and were completed one year later.

In the summer of 1940 the first football matches take place, with the club donating the money to support the repair of Greek Warship "Elli" which was hit by Italian forces on World War II. On September later that year Panionios G.S.S. celebrated its 50th year together with the completion of building the new stadium. Since then it has been used constantly for over 70 years from Panionios G.S.S. associated clubs and sports divisions.

Improvement works have been undertaken in 2001 and 2003 including a cafeteria, Panionios G.S.S. sports shop, press and office facilities, improved medical and player facilities etc. Additionally a roof was placed above the East wing of the stadium. In 2009 Panionios G.S.S. installed an electronic ticketing system on the stadium to improve security in the team's matches.

Despite the improvements the core fan base of the club as well as its management strongly support that the old stadium is inadequate to cover the team's needs in terms of quality of services provided to the fans. Additionally, there are safety concerns as the stadium does not have enough entry and exit points in case of emergency.

The highest attendance ever recorded was in 1974 against Panathinaikos with 20,950 spectators. After the installation of seats and the reduction of the stadium's capacity there have been numerous matches with full attendance mainly in European competitions. The most recent ticket 'sold-out' was against Panathinaikos in 2008. Apart from Panionios G.S.S. and their associated youth teams, the stadium was used for decades from Panionios G.S.S. athletes on track & field and numerous times from the Greece U21 and Greece U23. Additionally, due to the closing of many stadiums for renovation for the 2004 Athens Olympic Games, Nea Smyrni stadium was partly used by other football clubs. They included AEK Athens for the first half of the 2003–04 season and Olympiacos for one match in February 2003 against OFI. Last it has been the venue site for the 2004 Greek Cup final played by Panathinaikos and Olympiacos.

Due to its densely populated location, Nea Smyrni stadium has rarely been used as a concert site. The most famous concert ever taken place was Metallica's first appearance in Greece on 27 June 1993.

== Crest and colours ==
=== Crest ===
The first emblem of Panionios in Smyrna was a figure of Nike. In the mid-1990s, when the group belonged to the municipality of Nea Smyrni, a new emblem was introduced, influenced by the Barcelona mark. In this the shield had striped blue-colored colors and at the top left the Greek flag of the land and on the right an Ionic-style capital on a red background, referring to the Hellenism of the union and its Ionian roots. A similar crest has Panionios of Kalamata. Tsakiris reinstated the classic emblem of the club, the emblem that the club now uses, a shield with the colours of the group (cyan and red), used by the Greeks of the Ottoman Empire in a variety of events (for example the Hellenic-Ethos naval flag).

=== Colours ===
Panionios' colours are blue, red and white, mainly used as trim or as an alternative. On the appearances of the team there was a characteristic diagonial strip, which can be seen today in the crest of the team.

| 1908 | 1924 | 1930 | 2012 | 2013–14 (A) | 2014–15 (A) | 2016–17 |

Current sponsorships:

- Great Shirt Sponsor: Car.gr
- Official Sport Clothing Manufacturer: Luanvi
- Golden Sponsor: Funky Buddha

== Support ==
In 1983, at Nea Smyrni Square. There, in a night before a game of the team, the idea of Panthers began to get flesh and bones. A companionship that thought to do something different in Panionios' stadium decided to act. In that night, the name "Panthers" was first heard, which was to be the name of the companionship and then of the club. The Panthers officially started their activity as a club of organized fans, having been recognized by the administration of the association, which had then passed into the hands of the lasting Michalis Stamatelatos, who together with the also lasting Panagiotis Ammanitis, and they believed the different perception they used to see as fans.

After 2003, the Panthers against the then Achilleas Beos administration created many problems. The club lived a long period of persecution (courts, etc.), all of which led to an organizational contraction, as well as a difficulty finding a home. After 2006, the Panthers club is going through another season, as the Tsakiris administration approves and gives Panthers a space within the boundaries of the stadium where the current club is placed.

Panthers Club 1983 has official fan friendships with the supporters of Italian club Genoa and the Holmesdale Fanatics, the supporters' group of English club Crystal Palace. In Greece, there are connections with Niki Volos, based on shared historical elements such as the refugee background and the emblem of Niki Volos, which resembles the original symbol of Panionios in Smyrna, as well as the involvement of Panagiotis Ammanitis, who served as an administrator for both clubs. Joint activities with Basso Rango Ultras of Apollon Smyrnis have also contributed to the relationship between Panionios supporters and other fan groups. Since 1999, there has been communication and mutual respect between supporters of PAOK and Panionios. In addition, there is contact between the Panionios fans and the Warriors – Gate 6 group of Panetolikos.

Panthers Club 1983 has an active social action that has grown in recent years. Also, their lighthouse is Dimitros Dallas, the man who kept their team alive from Smyrna and gave Panionios life again in Athens.

== Players ==
=== Current squad ===
As of 28 September 2026

Note: Flags indicate national team as defined under FIFA eligibility rules; some limited exceptions apply. Players may hold more than one non-FIFA nationality.

| No. | Pos. | Nation | Player |
|---|---|---|---|
| 1 | GK | BEL | Álex Craninx |
| 2 | DF | GRE | Konstantinos Christopoulos |
| 4 | DF | GRE | Kyriakos Aslanidis |
| 5 | DF | GRE | Anastasios Avlonitis (captain) |
| 6 | MF | GRE | Angelos Liasos |
| 7 | MF | EST | Ioan Yakovlev |
| 8 | MF | GRE | Georgios Stoupis |
| 9 | FW | ESP | Rubén Sobrino |
| 10 | MF | GRE | Dimitris Kolovos (vice-captain) |
| 11 | MF | URU | Jorge Díaz |
| 14 | FW | GRE | Giannis Alexandrakis |
| 17 | FW | CMR | Ulrich Fokam |
| 18 | DF | POR | Vasco Gadelho |
| 20 | MF | GRE | Zisis Chatzistravos |
| 21 | DF | GRE | Dimitrios Tsantilas |
| 22 | MF | GRE | Alexandros Pavlopoulos |

| No. | Pos. | Nation | Player |
|---|---|---|---|
| 23 | FW | GRE | Savvas Mourgos |
| 24 | DF | GRE | Theodoros Zoulias |
| 25 | MF | SLE | Jonathan Morsay |
| 26 | DF | GRE | Alexandros Bouris |
| 27 | FW | GRE | Georgios Manalis |
| 28 | FW | GRE | Angelos Georgogiannis |
| 29 | DF | FIN | Richard Jensen |
| 31 | MF | SRB | Filip Bainović |
| 32 | MF | GRE | Rafail Pettas |
| 44 | FW | GRE | Alexis Bairamidis |
| 46 | GK | GRE | Theofanis Papavasiliou |
| 70 | MF | GRE | Giannis Theocharis |
| 77 | DF | GRE | Spyros Venardos |
| 90 | MF | POR | Miguel Tavares |
| 99 | GK | GRE | Dimitrios Skafidas |

=== Out on loan ===
Note: Flags indicate national team as defined under FIFA eligibility rules; some limited exceptions apply. Players may hold more than one non-FIFA nationality.

| No. | Pos. | Nation | Player |
|---|---|---|---|
| — | DF | GRE | Iasonas Nitsos (at Egaleo until 30 June 2027) |

== Former managers ==
- (Greece) Sophocles Magnes (1909–22)
- (Greece) Emmanouil Βamieros (1927–33)
- (Greece) Georgios Roussopoulos (1940–45)
- (England) Bill Baggett (1945–47)
- (Greece) Kostas Negrepontis (1950–54)
- (Greece) Nikos Zarkadis (1957)
- (Greece) Nikos Pentzaropoulos (1957)
- (Greece) Giannis Chelmis (1959–60)
- (Greece) Ioannis Skordilis (1960–65)
- (Greece) Nikos Zarkadis (1966–67)
- (Hungary) Dezső Bundzsák (1968–70)
- (England) Joe Mallett (1970–73)
- (Greece) Dan Georgiadis (1973–74)
- (England) Joe Mallett (1974)
- (Greece) Nikos Pentzaropoulos (1974–75)
- (Greece) Dan Georgiadis (1975)
- (Greece) Stelios Braoudakis (1975)
- (Greece) Panos Markovic (1975–76)
- (Greece) Stelios Braoudakis (1976–77)
- (Soviet Union) Igor Netto (1977–78)
- (Greece) Nikos Pentzaropoulos (1978)
- (Greece) Dan Georgiadis (1 July 1978 – 13 Dec 1978)
- (Greece) Panos Markovic (14 Dec 1978 – 30 June 1979)
- (Germany) Siegfried Melzig (1 July 1979 – 3 Dec 1979)
- (Greece) Lakis Petropoulos (6 Dec 1979 – 30 June 1980)
- (Serbia) Salimis Milosevic (1 July 1980 – 29 Dec 1980)
- (Greece) Lakis Petropoulos (30 Dec 1980 – 30 June 1981)
- (Greece) Panos Markovic (1 July 1981 – 2 May 1983)
- (Greece) Stathis Chaitas (2 May 1983 – 30 June 1983)
- (Poland) Egon Piechaczek (1 July 1983 – 29 Feb 1984)
- (Greece) Stathis Chaitas (1 March 1984 – 20 May 1984)
- (Greece) Nikos Alefantos (21 May 1984 – 5 April 1985)
- (Cyprus) Doros Kleovoulou (caretaker) (6 April 1985 – 30 June 1985)
- (Belgium) Urbain Braems (1 July 1985 – 30 June 1988)
- (Sweden) Bo Johansson (1 July 1988 – 10 Nov 1989)
- (Austria) Helmut Senekowitsch (20 Nov 1989 – 30 June 1990)
- (Serbia) Momčilo Vukotić (1 July 1990 – Jan 1993)
- (Greece) Ioannis Kyrastas (Jan 1993 – 30 June 1993)
- (Greece) Andreas Michalopoulos (1 July 1993 – 10 Jan 1995)
- (Greece) Dimitris Mavrikis (caretaker) (11 Jan 1995 – 24 Jan 1995)
- (Romania) Emerich Jenei (25 Jan 1995 – 27 Nov 1995)
- (Greece) Nikos Alefantos (27 Nov 1995 – 29 Jan 1996)
- (Greece) Christos Emvoliadis (caretaker) (29 Jan 1996 – 19 Feb 1996)
- (Greece) Ioannis Gounaris (20 Feb 1996 – 6 May 1996)
- (Greece) Stathis Chaitas (6 May 1996 – 30 June 1996)
- (Greece) Ioannis Kyrastas (1 July 1996 – 14 Nov 1997)
- (Greece) Christos Emvoliadis (15 Nov 1997 – 30 June 1998)
- (Republic of Ireland) Ronnie Whelan (1 July 1998 – 30 June 1999)
- (Poland) Jacek Gmoch (1 July 1999 – 22 Nov 1999)
- (Greece) Makis Katsavakis (24 Nov 1999 – 12 April 2000)
- (Greece) Christos Emvoliadis (12 April 2000 – 30 June 2000)
- (Serbia) Zoran Filipović (1 July 2000 – 18 Dec 2000)
- (Greece) Dimitrios Barbalias (19 Dec 2000 – 5 Feb 2001)
- (Finland) Martti Kuusela (6 Feb 2001 – 22 Aug 2001)
- (Romania) Dumitru Dumitriu (30 Aug 2001 – 30 June 2002)
- (Slovakia) Jozef Bubenko (1 July 2002 – 30 June 2004)
- (Slovakia) Karol Pecze (1 July 2004 – 22 Oct 2004)
- (Greece) Georgios Vazakas (23 Oct 2004 – 16 April 2005)
- (Greece) Dimitrios Barbalias (caretaker) (18 April 2005 – 30 June 2005)
- (Czech Republic) Josef Csaplár (1 July 2005 – Sept 11, 2005)
- (Greece) Nikos Pantelis (caretaker) (Sept 11, 2005 – 1 Oct 2005)
- (Slovakia) Jozef Bubenko (16 Oct 2005 – 20 Feb 2006)
- (Greece) Vangelis Vlachos (21 Feb 2006 – 30 May 2006)
- (Germany) Ewald Lienen (15 June 2006 – 11 Nov 2008)
- (Greece) Takis Lemonis (12 Nov 2008 – 2 Dec 2008)
- (Greece) Joti Stamatopoulos (3 Dec 2008 – 30 June 2009)
- (Belgium) Emilio Ferrera (1 July 2009 – 26 Jan 2010)
- (Greece) Akis Mantzios (caretaker) (26 Jan 2010 – 2 Feb 2010)
- (Greece) Georgios Paraschos (3 Feb 2010 – 25 April 2010)
- (Sweden) Mikael Stahre (25 April 2010 – 28 Oct 2010)
- (Greece) Akis Mantzios (caretaker) (28 Oct 2010 – 7 Nov 2010)
- (Greece) Georgios Paraschos (8 Nov 2010 – 17 Nov 2010)
- (Greece) Akis Mantzios (caretaker) (16 Nov 2010 – 9 Dec 2010)
- (Greece) Takis Lemonis (10 Dec 2010 – 22 Nov 2011)
- (Greece) Akis Mantzios (24 Nov 2011 – 30 April 2012)
- (Greece) Dimitrios Eleftheropoulos (29 May 2012 – 16 Feb 2013)
- (Greece) Konstantinos Panagopoulos (18 Feb 2013 – 7 July 2013)
- (Greece) Nikos Pantelis (9 July 2013 – 16 Dec 2013)
- (Greece) Konstantinos Panagopoulos (16 Dec 2013 – 15 Feb 2014)
- (Greece) Dimitrios Terezopoulos (caretaker) (16 Feb 2014 – 17 Feb 2014)
- (Greece) Nikos Anastopoulos (18 Feb 2014 – 5 May 2014)
- (Greece) Dimitrios Terezopoulos (5 May 2014 – 1 Jan 2015)
- (Greece) Marinos Ouzounidis (2 Jan 2015 – 8 Aug 2016)
- (Serbia) Vladan Milojević (11 Aug 2016 – 31 May 2017)
- (Greece) Michalis Grigoriou (1 Jun 2017 – 6 May 2018)
- (France) José Anigo (1 Jun 2018 – 2 Dec 2018)
- (Greece) Akis Mantzios (4 Dec 2018 – 2 Sept 2019)
- (Cyprus) Nikki Papavasiliou (3 Sept 2019 – 19 Feb 2020)
- (Greece) Dimitris Koropoulis (caretaker) (21 Feb 2020 – 25 Feb 2020)
- (Greece) Leonidas Vokolos (26 Feb 2020 – 24 Sept 2020)
- (Greece) Dimitris Koropoulis (25 Sept 2020 – 28 Nov 2021)
- (Greece) Vaggelis Stavrakopoulos (1 Dec 2021 – 23 May 2022 )
- (Greece) Nikolaos Koustas (1 July 2022 – 20 February 2023)
- (Greece) Periklis Papapanagis (22 February 2023 – 30 June 2023)
- (Greece) Konstantinos Georgiadis (3 July 2023 – 15 July 2024)
- (Greece) Antonis Nikopolidis (26 July 2024 – 12 January 2025)
- (Greece) Epaminondas Koutromanos (caretaker) (12 January 2025 – 30 June 2025)
- (Greece) Pavlos Dermitzakis (1 July 2025 – 7 March 2026)
- (Greece) Vangelis Konstantinou (caretaker) (14 March 2026 – 30 June 2026)
- (Spain) Juan Ferrando (1 July 2026 – 8 November 2026)
- (Greece) Dimitris Koropoulis (12 November 2026 – present)

== Honours ==
Panionios F.C. honours
| Type | Competition | Titles | Winners | Runners-up |
|---|---|---|---|---|
| European | Balkans Cup | 1 | 1970–71 | 1985–86 |
| Domestic | Super League Greece | 0 | | 1950–51, 1970–71 |
| Domestic | Super League Greece 2 | 1 | 1996–97 | 2025–26 |
| Domestic | Gamma Ethniki | 1 | 2023–24 | 2021–22 |
| Domestic | Delta Ethniki | 1 | 2020–21 | |
| Domestic | Greek Cup | 2 | 1978–79, 1997–98 | 1951–52, 1960–61, 1966–67, 1988–89 |
| Regional | Athens FCA First Division | 1 | 1950–51 | 1946–47, 1948–49, 1949–50, 1958–59 |

- record
- ^{S} Shared record

=== Best performance in UEFA competitions ===
- UEFA Cup Winners' Cup
  - Quarter-finals (1): 1998–99

== Seasons in the 21st century ==
| Season | Category | Position | Cup | Notes |
|---|---|---|---|---|
| 2000–01 | Alpha Ethniki (1st division) | 9th | R16 | |
| 2001–02 | Alpha Ethniki (1st division) | 7th | 2R | |
| 2002–03 | Alpha Ethniki (1st division) | **5th** | QF | Qualified for 2003–04 UEFA Cup |
| 2003–04 | Alpha Ethniki (1st division) | 6th | QF | Qualified for 2004–05 UEFA Cup |
| 2004–05 | Alpha Ethniki (1st division) | 11th | QF | |
| 2005–06 | Alpha Ethniki (1st division) | 11th | R16 | |
| 2006–07 | Super League (1st division) | **5th** | 5R | Qualified for 2007–08 UEFA Cup |
| 2007–08 | Super League (1st division) | **5th** | 5R | Qualified for 2008 UEFA Intertoto Cup |
| 2008–09 | Super League (1st division) | 8th | QF | |
| 2009–10 | Super League (1st division) | 9th | QF | |
| 2010–11 | Super League (1st division) | 10th | 4R | |
| 2011–12 | Super League (1st division) | 12th | QF | |
| 2012–13 | Super League (1st division) | 8th | 3R | |
| 2013–14 | Super League (1st division) | 13th | QF | |
| 2014–15 | Super League (1st division) | 12th | QF | |
| 2015–16 | Super League (1st division) | **5th** | QF | |
| 2016–17 | Super League (1st division) | **5th** | GS | Qualified for 2017–18 UEFA Europa League |
| 2017–18 | Super League (1st division) | 7th | SF | |
| 2018–19 | Super League (1st division) | 6th | QF | |
| 2019–20 | Super League (1st division) | 14th | R16 | Demoted to Gamma Ethniki |
| 2020–21 | Gamma Ethniki (4th Division) | **1st** | – | |
| 2021–22 | Gamma Ethniki (3rd division) | 2nd | – | |
| 2022–23 | Gamma Ethniki (3rd division) | 3rd | – | |
| 2023–24 | Gamma Ethniki (3rd division) | **1st** | – | |
| 2024–25 | Super League 2 (2nd division) | 3rd | QF | |
| 2025–26 | Super League 2 (2nd division) | 2nd | QR | |

Best position in bold.

Key: QR = Qualifying Round, 3R = Third Round, 4R = Fourth Round, 5R = Fifth Round, GS = Group Stage, QF = Quarter-finals, SF = Semi-finals.

== European matches ==
| Season | Competition | Round | Club | Home | Away | Qual. |
|---|---|---|---|---|---|---|
| 1964–65 | Intertoto Cup | Group C1 | (Sweden) Malmö FF | 1–1 | 1–5 | |
| 1964–65 | Intertoto Cup | Group C1 | (Socialist Federal Republic of Yugoslavia) Dinamo Zagreb | 2–2* | — | |
| 1964–65 | Intertoto Cup | Group C1 | (France) Toulouse | 0–3* | — | |
| 1969–70 | Inter-Cities Fairs Cup | First Round | (East Germany) Hansa Rostock | 2–0 | 0–3 | |
| 1971 | Balkans Cup | Group B | (Turkey) Altay | 1–0 | 1–2 | |
| 1971 | Balkans Cup | Group B | (Romania) Steagul Roșu Brașov | 2–0 | 1–1 | |
| 1971 | Balkans Cup | Finals | (Albania) Besa Kavajë | 2–1 | 1–1 | |
| 1971–72 | UEFA Cup | First Round | (Spain) Atlético Madrid | 1–0 | 1–2 | |
| 1971–72 | UEFA Cup | Second Round | (Hungary) Ferencváros | 0–2 | 0–6 | |
| 1975 | Balkans Cup | Group B | (Socialist Federal Republic of Yugoslavia) Radnički Niš | 0–0 | 0–2 | |
| 1975 | Balkans Cup | Group B | (Albania) 17 Nëntori | 2–1 | 0–6 | |
| 1979–80 | UEFA Cup Winners' Cup | First Round | (Netherlands) Twente | 4–0 | 1–3 | |
| 1979–80 | UEFA Cup Winners' Cup | Second Round | (Sweden) IFK Göteborg | 1–0 | 0–2 | |
| 1986 | Balkans Cup | Quarter-finals | (Bulgaria) Botev Vratsa | 3–2 | 3–1 | |
| 1986 | Balkans Cup | Semi-finals | (Romania) Gloria Buzău | 1–1 | 3–1 | |
| 1986 | Balkans Cup | Finals | (Bulgaria) Slavia Sofia | 3–2 | 3–0 | |
| 1987–88 | UEFA Cup | First Round | (France) Toulouse | 0–1 | 1–5 | |
| 1998–99 | UEFA Cup Winners' Cup | First Round | (Finland) FC Haka | 2–0 | 3–1 | |
| 1998–99 | UEFA Cup Winners' Cup | Second Round | (Cyprus) Apollon Limassol | 3–2 | 1–0 | |
| 1998–99 | UEFA Cup Winners' Cup | Quarter-finals | (Italy) Lazio | 0–4 | 0–3 | |
| 2003–04 | UEFA Cup | First Round | (Denmark) FC Nordsjælland | 2–1 | 1–0 | |
| 2003–04 | UEFA Cup | Second Round | (Spain) Barcelona | 0–3 | 0–2 | |
| 2004–05 | UEFA Cup | First Round | (Italy) Udinese | 3–1 | 0–1 | |
| 2004–05 | UEFA Cup | Group stage | (England) Newcastle United | 0–1 | | |
| 2004–05 | UEFA Cup | Group stage | (Portugal) Sporting CP | | 1–4 | |
| 2004–05 | UEFA Cup | Group stage | (Georgia (country)) Dinamo Tbilisi | 5–2 | | |
| 2004–05 | UEFA Cup | Group stage | (France) Sochaux | | 0–1 | |
| 2007–08 | UEFA Cup | First Round | (France) Sochaux | 0–1 | 2–0 | |
| 2007–08 | UEFA Cup | Group stage | (Sweden) Helsingborgs IF | | 1–1 | |
| 2007–08 | UEFA Cup | Group stage | (Turkey) Galatasaray | 0–3 | | |
| 2007–08 | UEFA Cup | Group stage | Austria Wien | | 1–0 | |
| 2007–08 | UEFA Cup | Group stage | (France) Bordeaux | 2–3 | | |
| 2008 | UEFA Intertoto Cup | Second round | (Serbia) OFK Beograd | 3–1 | 0–1 | |
| 2008 | UEFA Intertoto Cup | Third round | (Italy) Napoli | 0–1 | 0–1 | |
| 2017–18 | UEFA Europa League | Second qualifying round | (Slovenia) ND Gorica | 2–0 | 3–2 | |
| 2017–18 | UEFA Europa League | Third qualifying round | (Israel) Maccabi Tel Aviv | 0–1 | 0–1 | |

* In the summer of 1964 Panionios took part in the Cup Rapan in place of Olympiacos, who retired after two matches, against Toulouse (2–4) and Dinamo Zagreb (0–4). The results were calculated in the standings without replay for Panionios. Panionios so had three games: two at home Kaftantzoglio Stadium, which had a lights away with Malmo. The away match against Toulouse, which refused to be played by Olympiacos, was awarded 3–0 for the French club.

* Panionios' campaigns in European competitions were in their history with golden letters.

== See also ==
- Panionios G.S.S.
- Panionios B.C.
- Panionios Women's Basketball
- Panionios V.C.
- Panionios Water Polo Club
- Nea Smyrni Stadium
