= Konstantinos Panagopoulos =

Greek footballer (born 1977)

Personal information
- Date of birth: 23 September 1977 (age 49)
- Place of birth: Nikaia, Greece

Team information
- Current team: Aiolikos (manager)

Managerial career
- Years: Team
- 2013: Panionios
- 2013: AEL
- 2013–2014: Panionios
- 2014: AEL
- 2015: Aiolikos
- 2015: Trikala
- 2016: Apollon Smyrnis
- 2017–2019: Akropolis IF
- 2020–2022: IF Karlstad Fotboll
- 2024–: Aiolikos

Konstantinos Panagopoulos (Greek: Κωνσταντίνος Παναγόπουλος; born 23 September 1977) is a Greek football manager of Gamma Ethniki club Aiolikos.
