= Constantinos Tsakiris =

Greek shipowner and banker

- Born: 1971 (age 54–55); Athens, Greece
- Education: Imperial College London
- Occupations: Shipowner; Banker
- Board member of: Navipower Compania Naviera SA

Constantinos Tsakiris (Κωνσταντίνος Τσακίρης; born c. 1971) is a Greek shipowner and a banker in the United States.

He was owner of the Super League side Panionios after acquiring 85% of the club in the summer of 2006. One of his first actions was to alter the name of Panionios to their original name Panionios GSS (which stands for "Πανιώνιος Γυμνάστικος Σύλλογος Σμύρνης" or Panionios Gymnastic Club of Smyrna) and hire Ewald Lienen as first team manager. He would watch Panionios matches from gate 3 along with the "Panthers" – the oldest and most notorious fan club of Panionios. Constantinos Tsakiris is also the chairman and managing director of Paradise Navigation SA, a shipping management company established in Greece and founded back in 1968, as Navipower Compania Naviera SA, by the Tsakiris family, a traditional Greek ship-owning and operating family.

In 2007, he was on the successful bidding committee for Volos and Larissa to host the 17th Mediterranean Games to be held in 2013.
