= Fabri González =

Spanish footballer and manager

Personal information
- Full name: Fabriciano González Penelas
- Date of birth: 25 April 1955 (age 71)
- Place of birth: San Pedro, Spain
- Position: Winger

Youth career
- Santa Comba

Senior career*
| Years | Team | Apps | (Gls) |
| ?–1976 | Hostelería | | |
| 1976–1977 | Lugo | | |
| ?–? | Viveiro | | |
| ?–1978 | Villalbés | | |
| 1978–1982 | Santa Comba | | |

Managerial career
- 1978–1982: Santa Comba (player-coach)
- ?–?: Comercial
- ?–?: Villalbés
- 1987–1988: Lugo (assistant)
- 1988: Lugo
- 1988–1989: Villarrobledo
- 1989–1990: Sporting Mahonés
- 1990–1991: Gandía
- 1991–1992: Manlleu
- 1992: Mérida
- 1993–1994: Mérida
- 1994: Logroñés
- 1996: Elche
- 1997: Gimnàstic
- 1998: Murcia
- 1999–2000: Lugo
- 2001: Ovarense
- 2002: Campomaiorense
- 2003: Marco
- 2003: Avilés
- 2003: Zamora
- 2005: Huesca
- 2005: Almería
- 2005–2006: Burgos
- 2007: Alavés
- 2007–2008: Mérida
- 2008–2009: Cartagena
- 2010–2012: Granada
- 2012: Huesca
- 2012: Racing Santander
- 2013: Panathinaikos
- 2016: Ponferradina
- 2017: Petrolero
- 2017–2018: Lorca
- 2019: Karpaty Lviv
- * Club domestic league appearances and goals

Fabriciano "Fabri" González Penelas (born 25 April 1955) is a Spanish football manager.

After playing at a low level, he began a managerial career of over three decades. He had brief spells at Logroñés and Granada in La Liga, as well as seven clubs in the Segunda División. Abroad, he led teams in Portugal, Greece, Bolivia and Ukraine.

== Playing career ==
Born in San Pedro de Santa Comba, Lugo, González played as a right winger, and his career was spent exclusively in the lower leagues of his country and his native Galicia. He represented SD Hostelería, CD Lugo, Viveiro CF, RC Villalbés and SCD Santa Comba, the latter already as a player-coach.

== Coaching career ==
González started coaching in the mid-80's, his beginnings also being in amateur football. From ages 37–39 he worked with CP Mérida in Segunda División and, in the 1994–95 season, was one of five managers for CD Logroñés as the team suffered La Liga relegation with an all-time low 13 points: he was in charge of the La Rioja club for only three games, and did not look back on the experience with pleasure later.

In the following years, González worked in Segunda División B and lower, also returning to Lugo for a second spell as a manager. He also coached three teams in Portugal, all in the Liga de Honra.

González only returned to his country's division two in the 2004–05 campaign, working with UD Almería which he helped lead to the 14th position after registering one win, two draws and four losses in his seven games in charge. He met the same fate in his following experience in that tier, with Deportivo Alavés in 2006–07.

In 2008–09, González achieved promotion to the second division with FC Cartagena, even though he did not finish the season after being fired in February 2009. On 22 March 2010 he was appointed at Granada CF also in the third tier, helping the Andalusians win their group and finish as overall champions, with the subsequent promotion.

After renewing his contract with Granada, González led the club to a second consecutive promotion, finishing fifth in the regular season and eliminating RC Celta de Vigo and Elche CF in the play-offs. On 28 June 2011 he once again renewed his link to the Nazarí, for one year.

González was fired on 22 January 2012 following a 3–0 away loss at RCD Espanyol, even though Granada were still out of the relegation zone. He started 2012–13 at the helm of Racing de Santander in division two, being dismissed after less than four months in charge after a 4–0 defeat to Real Madrid Castilla.

On 8 January 2013, González was appointed at Panathinaikos F.C. in Greece. He was relieved of his duties on 31 March.

On 16 February 2016, after nearly three years without a job, González took over SD Ponferradina in the Spanish second division. He was sacked only two months later, and his team also suffered relegation.

On 22 December 2017, after an unassuming spell at Bolivia's Club Petrolero, González was appointed manager of second-tier newcomers Lorca FC. In January 2019, he signed for FC Karpaty Lviv of the Ukrainian Premier League; the team was facing relegation. He resigned in May due to health problems.

== Other activities ==
Apart from his football career, González worked as a teacher on several occasions, collaborating with the Castile-La Mancha School of Coaching in 1989 and teaching tactics and skills in its counterpart in the Balearic Islands the following year.

Additionally, he served as main teacher at the Galicia School of Coaching, in the field of tactics.

== Honours ==
Gimnàstic

- Segunda División B: 1996–97 (Group III)

Cartagena

- Segunda División B: 2008–09 (Group II)

Granada

- Segunda División B: 2009–10
